= SS1, Petaling Jaya =

SS1
- Inner Suburb
- Nickname: Kampung Tunku
- SS1 shown within Malaysia
- Coordinates: 3°05′58″N 101°37′12″E
- Country: Malaysia
- State: Selangor
- City: Petaling Jaya
- Federal seat: Damansara
- State seat: Kampung Tunku

Government
  - Local Authority: Petaling Jaya City Council
  - Mayor: Mohd Azizi Mohd Zain
  - Member of Parliament: Gobind Singh Deo
  - State Assembly Representative: Lim Yi Wei
  - Councilor: Ong Yew Thai
- Time zone: UTC+8 (MST)
- Postcode: 47300
- Dialling code: +60 378

SS1, Petaling Jaya is an inner suburb in Petaling Jaya, one of the biggest cities in Malaysia's most developed state of Selangor.

Also known as Kampung Tunku, it is about 5 km west of the city's central business district. Its local government is the Petaling Jaya City Council (MBPJ; Malay: Majlis Bandaraya Petaling Jaya).

The neighbourhood also shares its alternative name with Kampung Tunku, the Selangor state legislative assembly of the same name.

== Location ==
SS1 is located south of the Damansara–Puchong Expressway, past its larger inner suburb neighbour SS2. It borders SS3 to the west, SS9A to the south, with Section 22 and Section 51A to the east.

The SS in the neighborhood's name stands for Sungai Way-Subang. Addresses in PJ are standardized. The town is divided into numbered sections (seksyen), which are denoted with just S (eastern PJ), SS (central and western PJ), PJU (northern PJ), and PJS (southern PJ). The northern chunk is also known as Damansara.

== Education ==
One primary school operates in the area: the SK Kampung Tunku, a national school, is located on Jalan SS1/11.

== Representation ==
The current Member of Parliament is Damansara's Gobind Singh Deo from the Democratic Action Party (DAP). SS1 is also served by Kampung Tunku state assemblywoman Lim Yi Wei from DAP as well.

SS1's Councilor is Ong Yew Thai.

== Religion ==
The Masjid Kampung Tunku mosque is in the northeastern side of SS 1, on Jalan SS1/31. Completed on January 15, 2002, it can house some 2,500 Muslim devotees with a compound area of 1.729 hectares.

== Economy ==
A small residential area, SS1 has few commercial options to boast of, aside from a shoplot block with five shops consisting of mostly restaurants, a few houses-turned-offices and a petrol station on the same street along Jalan Baiduri (or Jalan SS 1/22).

It is also home to the local post office and a 7-Eleven convenience store just next to it.

SS1 also borders the city council's public crematorium and a Chinese cemetery, both located in Section 51A to the east.

== Transport ==
Though quiet, SS1 residents enjoy some direct access to main road and public transport services, with the inner suburb bordering the Damansara–Puchong Expressway via SS2, which acts a link to Subang Jaya and Puchong to the west and Kuala Lumpur to the east.

Motorists also commonly use SS1 as a means to access the adjacent busier inner suburbs of SS2, SS3 and Section 51A.

Residents in this neighbourhood can also find two Kelana Jaya Line LRT stations within a few minutes' walking distance north of the inner suburb, namely the Taman Bahagia LRT Station and Taman Paramount LRT Station

Rapid KL and the free-to-use Petaling Jaya City buses also pass through the neighbourhood's main streets on their way to other districts.

Route No.	Origin	Destination	Via	Remarks
T785	KJ22 Taman Paramount LRT	KJ22 Taman Paramount LRT	Kampung Tunku Pos Malaysia office, Jalan SS1/11; Jalan Baiduri SS1/22; Jalan SS1/36	
PJ03	KJ23 Taman Bahagia LRT	KJ23 Taman Bahagia LRT	Jalan SS1/32; Jalan SS1/38	
PJ04	KJ23 Taman Bahagia LRT	KJ23 Taman Bahagia LRT	Jalan SS1/11; Jalan SS1/1	
