= Speaker of the Selangor State Legislative Assembly =

Presiding officer of the legislature of Selangor

- Yang di-Pertua Dewan Undangan Negeri Selangor 雪兰莪州立法议会议长
- Coat of arms of Selangor

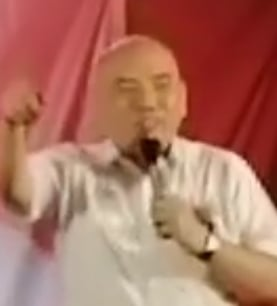
- Incumbent; Lau Weng San since 19 September 2023
- Selangor State Legislative Assembly
- Style: Yang Berhormat; Tuan Yang di-Pertua (formal); Tuan Speaker/Tuan Pengerusi (informal and within the assembly)
- Status: Highest ranking presiding officer of the Selangor State Legislative Assembly
- Member of: Committee of Selection, Standing Orders Committee, House Committee, Committee of Privileges
- Reports to: Selangor State Legislative Assembly
- Seat: Sultan Salahuddin Abdul Aziz Shah Building, Shah Alam, Selangor
- Appointer: Elected by members of the Selangor State Legislative Assembly
- Term length: Elected at the start of each Selangor State Legislative Assembly, upon a vacancy
- Constituting instrument: Constitution of Selangor
- Inaugural holder: Abdullah Hassan
- Formation: 8 July 1957; 69 years ago
- Deputy: Deputy Speaker of the Selangor State Legislative Assembly
- Website: dewan.selangor.gov.my

The Speaker of the Selangor State Legislative Assembly (Malay: Yang di-Pertua Dewan Undangan Negeri Selangor; Chinese: 雪兰莪州立法议会议长; Tamil: சிலாங்கூர் மாநில சட்டப் பேரவையின் சபாநாயகர்) is the presiding officer in the Selangor State Legislative Assembly, the unicameral legislature of the Malaysian state of Selangor. They are responsible for convening sessions of the Selangor State Legislative Assembly, organising debates, and examining the admissibility of petitions, bills, and amendments. In the absence of the Speaker, the deputy will take their place.

The speaker is selected through ballot in the first session of a new legislative assembly.

The incumbent Speaker is Lau Weng San. He was elected on 19 September 2023 for the 15th Selangor State Legislative Assembly. The inaugural Speaker is Abdullah Hassan who served from 8 July 1959 to 17 November 1962.

== Election ==
The Selangor State Legislative Assembly may from time to time elect a person of eligibility to become a Speaker of the assembly. A speaker may not be elected to be a Speaker unless he is a member or qualified to be a member of the legislative assembly. The speaker may resign at any time. He must vacate his office when either the legislative assembly first meet after a state election, or upon being disqualified to be a speaker, or upon the dissolution of the assembly, or on his ceasing to be a member of assembly other than because of the dissolution of the legislative assembly or ceased to be qualified of a member. A Deputy Speaker may also be chosen from any member of the legislative assembly.

== List of Speakers of the Selangor State Legislative Assembly ==
Colour key (for political parties):
Alliance / Barisan Nasional Pakatan Rakyat Pakatan Harapan

No.	Portrait	Name (Birth–Death) (Constituency)	Term of office			Party	Election	Assembly
No.	Portrait	Name (Birth–Death) (Constituency)	Took office	Left office	Time in office	Party	Election	Assembly
1		Dato'; Abdullah Hassan; MLA for Port Swettenham	8 July 1959	17 November 1962	3 years, 133 days	Alliance (UMNO)	1959	1st
2		Dato'; Abdullah Mohd Yassin; MLA for Kampong Bharu	4 December 1962	12 November 1966	3 years, 344 days	Alliance (UMNO)	–	1st
2		Dato'; Abdullah Mohd Yassin; MLA for Kampong Bharu	4 December 1962	12 November 1966	3 years, 344 days	Alliance (UMNO)	1964	2nd
3		Raja Nong Chik Raja Ishak; MLA for Dengkil	9 December 1966	19 March 1969	2 years, 101 days	Alliance (UMNO)	–	2nd
4		Dato'; Raja Zulkifli Raja Borhan; MLA for Port Swettenham	15 March 1971	30 July 1974	3 years, 138 days	Alliance (UMNO)	1969	3rd
5		Tan Sri; Shoib Ahmad; MLA for Kalumpang	16 September 1974	29 March 1982	7 years, 195 days	BN (UMNO)	1974	4th
5		Tan Sri; Shoib Ahmad; MLA for Kalumpang	16 September 1974	29 March 1982	7 years, 195 days	BN (UMNO)	1978	5th
6		Dato' Haji; Saidin Tamby; MLA for Gombak (1982–1986); MLA for Paya Jaras (1986–1990)	4 June 1982	5 October 1990	8 years, 124 days	BN (UMNO)	1982	6th
6		Dato' Haji; Saidin Tamby; MLA for Gombak (1982–1986); MLA for Paya Jaras (1986–1990)	4 June 1982	5 October 1990	8 years, 124 days	BN (UMNO)	1986	7th
7		Dato' Haji; Zainal Dahalan; MLA for Sungai Air Tawar	19 November 1990	25 April 1995	4 years, 158 days	BN (UMNO)	1990	8th
8		Tan Sri Dato' Seri Haji; Onn Ismail (1939–2023); MLA for Selat Klang (1995–1999); Non-MLA (1999–2008)	18 May 1995	22 April 2008	12 years, 341 days	BN (UMNO)	1995	9th
8		Tan Sri Dato' Seri Haji; Onn Ismail (1939–2023); MLA for Selat Klang (1995–1999); Non-MLA (1999–2008)	18 May 1995	22 April 2008	12 years, 341 days	BN (UMNO)	1999	10th
8		Tan Sri Dato' Seri Haji; Onn Ismail (1939–2023); MLA for Selat Klang (1995–1999); Non-MLA (1999–2008)	18 May 1995	22 April 2008	12 years, 341 days	BN (UMNO)	2004	11th
9		Dato'; Teng Chang Khim (born 1963); MLA for Sungai Pinang	22 April 2008	30 May 2013	5 years, 39 days	PR (DAP)	2008	12th
10		Hannah Yeoh Tseow Suan (born 1979); MLA for Subang Jaya	21 June 2013	9 April 2018	4 years, 293 days	PR (DAP)		
10		Hannah Yeoh Tseow Suan (born 1979); MLA for Subang Jaya	21 June 2013	9 April 2018	4 years, 293 days	PR (DAP)	2013	13th
10		Hannah Yeoh Tseow Suan (born 1979); MLA for Subang Jaya	21 June 2013	9 April 2018	4 years, 293 days	PH (DAP)	2013	13th
11		Dato'; Ng Suee Lim (born 1970); MLA for Sekinchan	26 June 2018	23 June 2023	4 years, 363 days	PH (DAP)	2018	14th
12		Lau Weng San (born 1978); Non-MLA	19 September 2023	Incumbent	2 years, 355 days	PH (DAP)	2023	15th

== See also ==
- Selangor
- Selangor State Legislative Assembly
