= Wong Sai Hou =

Malaysian politician

Yang Berbahagia Dato' Wong Sai Hou DPMS

Member of the Selangor State Legislative Assembly for Kampung Tunku
- In office 29 November 1999 – 8 March 2008
- Preceded by: Khoo Ooi Seng (BN–MCA)
- Succeeded by: Lau Weng San (PR–DAP)
- Majority: 2,736 (1999); 3,612 (2004)

Personal details
- Party: Malaysian Chinese Association (MCA)
- Other political affiliations: Barisan Nasional
- Occupation: Politician

Wong Sai Hou is a former state assemblyman for Kampung Tunku, Malaysia. He is also state vice-chairman and a veteran member of Malaysian Chinese Association (MCA) (34 years). His wife, Jennifer Wong (Goh Beng Lan) is the former Principal of SMK La Salle Brickfields. His house was attacked and burned with a gasoline bomb in 2005 but was put out by his wife.

== Election results ==
Selangor State Legislative Assembly
Year	Constituency	Candidate	Votes	Pct	Opponent(s)	Votes	Pct	Ballots cast	Majority	Turnout
1986	N25 Damansara Utara	Wong Sai Hou (SDP)	1,374	6.93%	Madhavan Nair Narayanan Nair (DAP)	10,050	50.70%	20,121	1,651	69.36%
1986	N25 Damansara Utara	Wong Sai Hou (SDP)	1,374	6.93%	Chan Tse Yuen (MCA)	8,399	42.37%	20,121	1,651	69.36%
1999	N26 Kampung Tunku	Wong Sai Hou (MCA)	11,658	56.65%	Kannan Thangarasu (DAP)	8,922	43.35%	20,820	2,736	67.90%
2004	N35 Kampung Tunku	Wong Sai Hou (MCA)	11,979	58.88%	Ean Yong Hian Wah (DAP)	8,367	41.12%	20,616	3,612	66.77%

== Honours ==
- Selangor
  - Knight Commander of the Order of the Crown of Selangor (DPMS) – Dato' (2003)
