= Mohd Kamri Kamaruddin =

Malaysian politician

Yang Berhormat Tuan Mohd Kamri Kamaruddin MLA
- محمّد قمري قمرالدين

Deputy Speaker of the Selangor State Legislative Assembly
- Incumbent
- Assumed office 19 September 2023
- Monarch: Sharafuddin
- Menteri Besar: Amirudin Shari
- Speaker: Lau Weng San
- Preceded by: Hasnul Baharuddin
- Constituency: Bukit Antarabangsa

Member of the Selangor State Legislative Assembly for Bukit Antarabangsa
- Incumbent
- Assumed office 12 August 2023
- Preceded by: Azmin Ali (PH–PKR)
- Majority: 16,280 (2023)

Personal details
- Born: Mohd Kamri bin Kamaruddin
- Citizenship: Malaysian
- Party: People's Justice Party (PKR)
- Other political affiliations: Pakatan Harapan (PH)
- Education: University of Technology Malaysia
- Occupation: Politician

Mohd Kamri bin Kamaruddin is a Malaysian politician who has served as Deputy Speaker of the Selangor State Legislative Assembly since September 2023 and Member of the Selangor State Legislative Assembly (MLA) for Bukit Antarabangsa since August 2023. He is a member of the People's Justice Party (PKR), a component party of the Pakatan Harapan (PH) coalition.

== Political career ==
=== Deputy Speaker of the Selangor State Legislative Assembly (since 2023) ===
On 19 September 2023, Mohd Kamri of PH was nominated by Pelabuhan Klang MLA Azmizam Zaman Huri and supported by Teratai MLA Yew Jia Haur as the Deputy Speaker of the Selangor State Legislative Assembly. He was elected to the position with 34 votes, defeating his opponent Sungai Ramal MLA Mohd Shafie Ngah of Perikatan Nasional (PN), the candidate who was nominated by Sabak MLA Sallehen Mukhyi and supported by Gombak Setia MLA Muhammad Hilman Idham with 22 votes from the assembly.

=== Member of the Selangor State Legislative Assembly (since 2023) ===
==== 2023 Selangor state election ====
In the 2023 Selangor state election, Mohd Kamri made his electoral debut after being nominated by PH to contest the Bukit Antarabangsa state seat. He won the seat and was elected to the Selangor State Legislative Assembly as the Bukit Antarabangsa MLA for the first term after defeating Sasha Lyna Abdul Latif of PN and Melanie Ting Yi-Hlin of the Malaysian United Democratic Alliance (MUDA) by a majority of 16,280 votes.

== Election results ==
Selangor State Legislative Assembly
Year	Constituency	Candidate	Votes	Pct	Opponent(s)	Votes	Pct	Ballots cast	Majority	Turnout
2023	N19 Bukit Antarabangsa	Mohd Kamri Kamaruddin (PKR)	30,772	65.86%	Sasha Lyna Abdul Latif (BERSATU)	14,492	31.01%	46,726	16,280	67.23%
2023	N19 Bukit Antarabangsa	Mohd Kamri Kamaruddin (PKR)	30,772	65.86%	Melanie Ting Yi-Hlin (MUDA)	1,462	3.13%	46,726	16,280	67.23%
