= Tony Leong Tuck Chee =

Malaysian politician

Yang Berhormat Tuan Tony Leong Tuck Chee MLA
- 梁德志

Member of the Selangor State Legislative Assembly for Pandamaran
- Incumbent
- Assumed office 9 May 2018
- Preceded by: Eric Tan Pok Shyong (PR–DAP)
- Majority: 35,863 (2018); 40,298 (2023)

State Assistant Secretary of the Democratic Action Party of Selangor
- Incumbent
- Assumed office 10 November 2024
- Secretary-General: Anthony Loke Siew Fook
- State Chairman: Ng Sze Han
- State Secretary: Yeo Bee Yin
- Preceded by: Jamaliah Jamaluddin

State Assistant Organising Secretary of the Democratic Action Party of Selangor
- In office 14 November 2021 – 10 November 2024 Serving with Papparaidu Veraman
- Secretary-General: Lim Guan Eng (2021–2022); Anthony Loke Siew Fook (2022–2024)
- State Chairman: Gobind Singh Deo
- State Organising Secretary: Lau Weng San
- Preceded by: Tee Boon Hock
- Succeeded by: Lee Fu Haw

Personal details
- Born: Tony Leong Tuck Chee; 29 April 1976 (age 49) Kuala Lumpur, Malaysia
- Citizenship: Malaysian
- Party: Democratic Action Party (DAP)
- Other political affiliations: Pakatan Harapan (PH)
- Parent: 黄水仙 (mother)
- Occupation: Politician

Tony Leong Tuck Chee

Chinese name
- Traditional Chinese: 梁德志
- Simplified Chinese: 梁德志
Transcriptions
Standard Mandarin
- Hanyu Pinyin: Liáng Dézhì

Tony Leong Tuck Chee (Chinese: 梁德志; pinyin: Liáng Dézhì; born 29 April 1976) is a Malaysian politician who has served as Member of the Selangor State Legislative Assembly (MLA) for Pandamaran since May 2018. He is a member of the Democratic Action Party (DAP), a component party of the Pakatan Harapan (PH) coalition. He has served as the State Assistant Secretary of DAP of Selangor since November 2024. He served as the State Assistant Organising Secretary of Selangor from November 2021 to his promotion to the Assistant Secretary in November 2024.

== Election results ==
Selangor State Legislative Assembly
Year	Constituency	Candidate	Votes	Pct	Opponent(s)	Votes	Pct	Ballots cast	Majority	Turnout
2018	N47 Pandamaran	Tony Leong Tuck Chee (DAP)	41,552	85.32%	Tee Hooi Ling (MCA)	5,689	11.68%	49,102	35,863	85.36%
2018	N47 Pandamaran	Tony Leong Tuck Chee (DAP)	41,552	85.32%	Santokh Singh Gurdev Singh (IKATAN)	1,459	3.00%	49,102	35,863	85.36%
2023	N47 Pandamaran	Tony Leong Tuck Chee (DAP)	46,999	86.75%	Gunalan Balakrishnan (BERSATU)	6,701	12.37%	54,488	40,298	71.91%
2023	N47 Pandamaran	Tony Leong Tuck Chee (DAP)	46,999	86.75%	Tan Kang Yap (PRM)	479	0.88%	54,488	40,298	71.91%
