= Papparaidu Veraman =

Malaysian politician

Yang Berhormat Tuan Papparaidu Veraman MLA
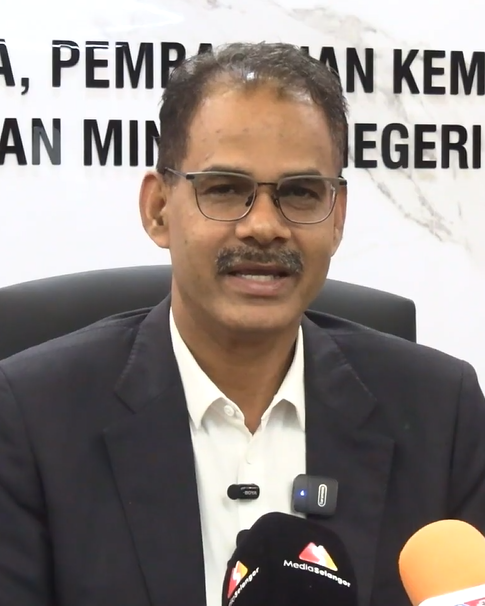

Member of the Selangor State Executive Council (Human Resources, Poverty Eradication, Indigenous and Minority Affairs & Buddhism, Christianity, Hinduism, Sikhism and Taoism) (Note: Assumed portfolios on 23 August 2023.)
- Incumbent
- Assumed office 21 August 2023 Serving with Ng Sze Han & Ng Suee Lim (Buddhism, Christianity, Hinduism, Sikhism and Taoism)
- Monarch: Sharafuddin
- Menteri Besar: Amirudin Shari
- Preceded by: Hee Loy Sian (Indigenous Affairs); Portfolios established (Human Resources, Poverty Eradication, Minority Affairs & Buddhism, Christianity, Hinduism, Sikhism and Taoism)
- Constituency: Banting

Member of the Selangor State Legislative Assembly for Banting
- Incumbent
- Assumed office 12 August 2023
- Preceded by: Lau Weng San (PH–DAP)
- Majority: 22,102 (2023)

State Assistant Organising Secretary of the Democratic Action Party of Selangor
- Incumbent
- Assumed office 14 November 2021 Serving with Tony Leong Tuck Chee (2021–2024) & Lee Fu Haw (since 2024)
- Secretary-General: Lim Guan Eng (2021–2022); Anthony Loke Siew Fook (since 2022)
- State Chairman: Gobind Singh Deo (2021–2024); Ng Sze Han (since 2024)
- State Organising Secretary: Lau Weng San (2021–2024); Tiew Way Keng (since 2024)
- Preceded by: Lau Weng San

Personal details
- Born: Papparaidu s/o Veraman; 31 March 1975 (age 51) Perak, Malaysia
- Citizenship: Malaysian
- Party: Democratic Action Party (DAP)
- Other political affiliations: Pakatan Harapan (PH)
- Relations: Ganabatirau Veraman (older brother); Buvaneswary Balasubramaniam (sister-in-law): Janany; Gowri; Narmatha; Srinivasarau; (nephews and nieces)
- Occupation: Politician

Papparaidu s/o Veraman (born 31 March 1975) is a Malaysian politician who has served as Member of the Selangor State Executive Council (EXCO) in the Pakatan Harapan (PH) state administration under Menteri Besar Amirudin Shari and Member of the Selangor State Legislative Assembly (MLA) for Banting since August 2023. He is a member of the Democratic Action Party (DAP), a component party of the PH coalition. He has also served the State Assistant Organising Secretary of DAP of Selangor since November 2021. He is also presently the only Selangor EXCO Member of Indian ethnicity and the younger brother of the Member of Parliament (MP) for Klang Ganabatirau Veraman.

== Political career ==
=== Member of the Selangor State Executive Council (since 2023) ===
In the 2023 Selangor state election, the ruling PH and Barisan Nasional (BN) won a simple majority in the Selangor State Legislative Assembly and was reelected to power. Following that, Sungai Tua MLA Amirudin of PH was reappointed the Menteri Besar. Papparaidu was appointed the Selangor EXCO Member and given the portfolios of Human Resources, Poverty Eradication, Indigenous and Minority Affairs as well as Buddhism, Christianity, Hinduism, Sikhism and Taoism (LIMAS) by Menteri Besar Amirudin on 21 and 23 August 2023 respectively.

=== Member of the Selangor State Legislative Assembly (since 2023) ===
==== 2023 Selangor state election ====
In the 2023 Selangor state election, Papparaidu made his electoral debut after being nominated by PH to contest the Banting state seat. Papparaidu won the seat and was elected to the Selangor State Legislative Assembly as the Banting MLA for the first term after defeating Saravanan Mutto Krishnan of Perikatan Nasional (PN) and independent candidate Ang Wei Yang by a majority of 22,102 votes.

== Election results ==
Selangor State Legislative Assembly
Year	Constituency	Candidate	Votes	Pct	Opponent(s)	Votes	Pct	Ballots cast	Majority	Turnout
2023	N52 Banting	Papparaidu Veraman (DAP)	27,223	80.58%	Saravanan Mutto Krishnan (Gerakan)	5,121	15.16%	33,783	22,102	75.12%
2023	N52 Banting	Papparaidu Veraman (DAP)	27,223	80.58%	Ang Wei Yang (IND)	1,439	4.26%	33,783	22,102	75.12%
