= Plaza Perangsang =

Skyscraper office buildings in Malaysia

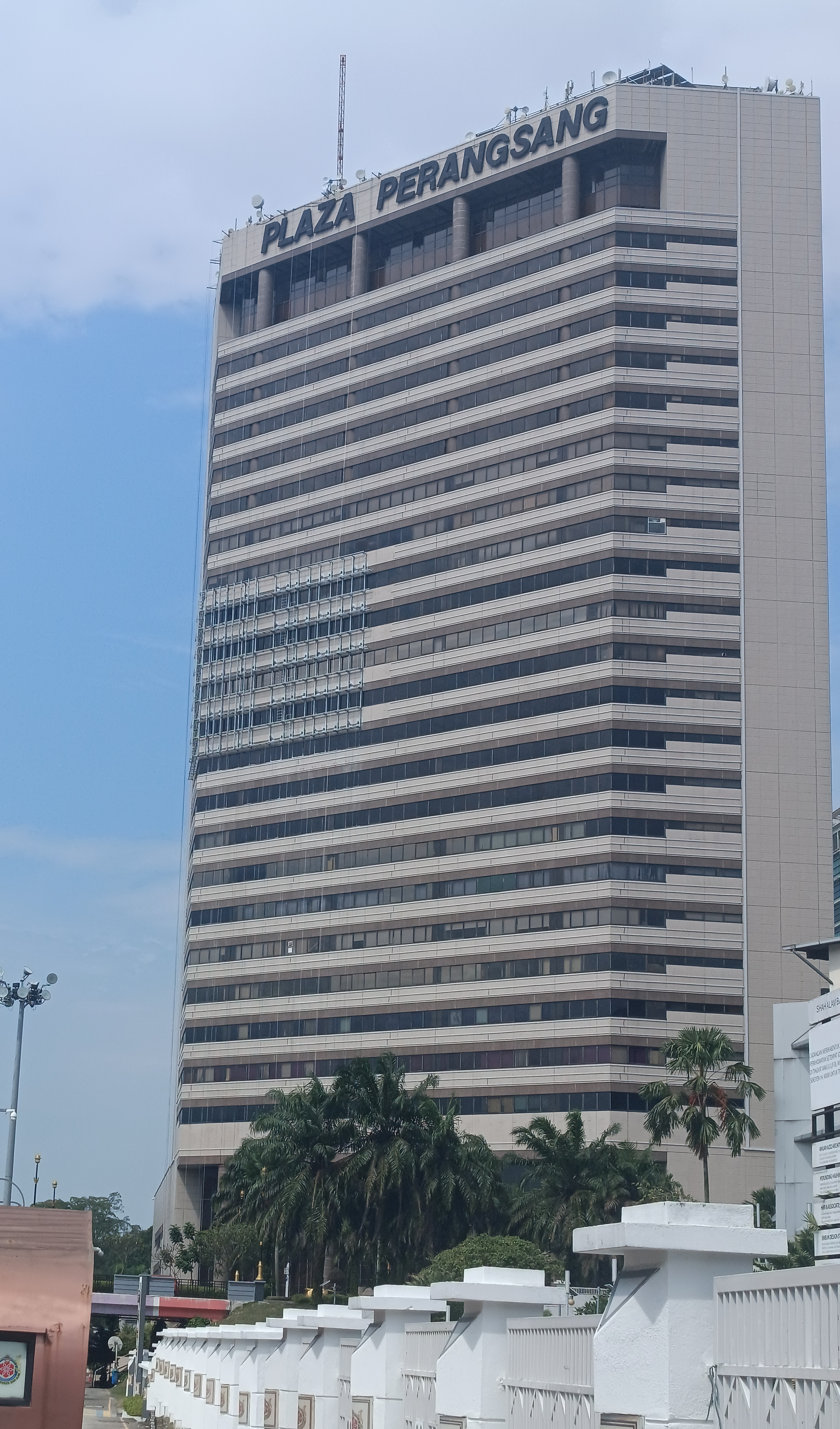

General information
- Type: Office, commercial
- Location: Shah Alam, Malaysia
- Construction started: 1985
- Completed: 1987
- Opening: 1988

Design and construction
- Architects: Kumpulan Darul Ehsan Berhad (KDEB); Kumpulan Perangsang Selangor Berhad (KPSB)

Plaza Perangsang is a major landmark in Shah Alam, Selangor, Malaysia. Located at Persiaran Perbandaran near Wisma MBSA, it houses several commercial facilities and hotels. It is one of the earliest skyscrapers in the city, besides the Sultan Salahuddin Abdul Aziz Shah Building and Wisma MBSA. It was opened in 1988. Quality Hotel (formerly Holiday Inn Shah Alam) is the earliest hotel in Shah Alam.

== Occupants in the Plaza Perangsang ==
- Quality Hotel, Shah Alam (until June 2014)
- Headquarters of the Kumpulan Darul Ehsan Berhad (KDEB) and Kumpulan Perangsang Selangor Berhad (KPSB)
- Lembaga Hasil Dalam Negeri (LHDN) Selangor branch
