= Ng Suee Lim =

Malaysian politician

Yang Berhormat Dato' Ng Suee Lim DPMS MLA
- 黄瑞林

Member of the Selangor State Executive Council
- Incumbent
- Assumed office 21 August 2023
- Monarch: Sharafuddin
- Menteri Besar: Amirudin Shari
- Portfolio: Local Government, New Village Development & Tourism
- Preceded by: Ng Sze Han (Local Government & New Village Development); Hee Loy Sian (Tourism)
- Constituency: Sekinchan

11th Speaker of the Selangor State Legislative Assembly
- In office 26 June 2018 – 23 June 2023
- Monarch: Sharafuddin
- Deputy: Mohd Khairuddin Othman (2018); Daroyah Alwi (2019–2020); Hasnul Baharuddin (2020–2023)
- Menteri Besar: Amirudin Shari
- Preceded by: Hannah Yeoh Tseow Suan
- Succeeded by: Lau Weng San
- Constituency: Sekinchan

Member of the Selangor State Legislative Assembly for Sekinchan
- Incumbent
- Assumed office 21 March 2004
- Preceded by: Chia Kim Lem (BN–MCA)
- Majority: 344 (2004); 190 (2008); 2,239 (2013); 2,844 (2018); 4,018 (2023)

National Vice Chairman of the Democratic Action Party
- Incumbent
- Assumed office 16 March 2025 Serving with: Chong Chieng Jen &; Teo Nie Ching &; Syahredzan Johan &; Arul Kumar Jambunathan
- National Chairman: Gobind Singh Deo
- Secretary-General: Anthony Loke Siew Fook

Assistant National Organising Secretary of the Democratic Action Party
- In office 20 March 2022 – 16 March 2025 Serving with Khoo Poay Tiong
- Secretary-General: Anthony Loke Siew Fook
- National Organising Secretary: Steven Sim Chee Keong
- Preceded by: Thomas Su Keong Siong
- Succeeded by: Tan Hong Pin

State Vice Chairman of the Democratic Action Party of Selangor
- Incumbent
- Assumed office 9 December 2018 Serving with: Ganabatirau Veraman (2018–2024) &; Ean Yong Hian Wah (since 2024)
- Secretary-General: Lim Guan Eng (2018–2022); Anthony Loke Siew Fook (since 2022)
- State Chairman: Gobind Singh Deo (2018–2024); Ng Sze Han (since 2024)
- Preceded by: Teng Chang Khim

Faction represented in the Selangor State Legislative Assembly
- 2004–2018: Democratic Action Party
- 2018–: Pakatan Harapan

Personal details
- Born: Ng Suee Lim; 13 July 1970 (age 56) Klang District, Selangor, Malaysia
- Party: Democratic Action Party (DAP)
- Other political affiliations: Barisan Alternatif (BA) (1999–2004); Pakatan Rakyat (PR) (2008–2015); Pakatan Harapan (PH) (since 2015)
- Children: 4
- Education: Klang High School
- Occupation: Politician

Ng Suee Lim

Chinese name
- Traditional Chinese: 黃瑞林
- Simplified Chinese: 黃瑞林
Transcriptions
Standard Mandarin
- Hanyu Pinyin: Huáng Ruìlín
Southern Min
- Hokkien POJ: N̂g Suī-lîm

Ng Suee Lim (Chinese: 黄瑞林; pinyin: Huáng Ruìlín; Pe̍h-ōe-jī: N̂g Suī-lîm; born 13 July 1970) is a Malaysian politician who has served as Member of the Selangor State Executive Council (EXCO) in the Pakatan Harapan (PH) state administration under Menteri Besar Amirudin Shari since August 2023 and Member of the Selangor State Legislative Assembly (MLA) for Sekinchan since March 2004. He previously served as the 11th Speaker of the Selangor State Legislative Assembly from June 2018 to June 2023. He is a member of the Democratic Action Party (DAP), a component party of the PH coalition. He has served as the National Vice Chairman of DAP since March 2025 post-DAP National Congress and the State Vice Chairman of DAP of Selangor since December 2018. He served as the Assistant National Organising Secretary of DAP from March 2022 to March 2025. He is also presently the longest-serving Selangor MLA of DAP, in office as the Sekinchan MLA for his fifth term.

== Political career ==
Ng Suee Lim got involved in politics especially DAP after reading a lot of media statements and books by the then-DAP Secretary-General Lim Kit Siang since he was in Year 6 at 1981–1982. He always attends dinners organized by local political leaders to collect donations. In class, he always debated with the History teacher about some historical events until he was labeled as an opposition. In 1995, he became the head of DAP Kapar branch.

In 1999 general election, he was suggested by Ronnie Liu Tian Khiew and Teng Chang Khim to contest in the Sekinchan state seat because there were no more political veterans who wanted to contest there. He contested at the age of 29 and gained 3,728 votes and lost with majority of 2,044 votes but won in the Malay community because he could speak Javanese.

In 2004 general election, many voters returned to support BN and numerous DAP, PKR and PAS candidates lost. Shockingly, Ng Suee Lim won in Sekinchan with a majority of 344 votes. He became one of only two members of the opposition party in the Selangor State Legislative Assembly at that time, alongside Teng Chang Khim.

In the 2008 general election, he successfully defended the seat and gained 5,403 votes with a majority of 190 votes.

Ng Suee Lim successfully retained the Sekinchan state seat in the subsequent 2013, 2018 and 2023 state elections. On 26 June 2018, Ng Suee Lim was nominated as the new Speaker by Menteri Besar Amirudin Shari, Teng Chang Khim seconded the motion, and it was approved. Ng Suee Lim was sworn in at 10:07 in the morning.

In 2023, he was appointed as a Selangor EXCO member in charge of Local Government, New Village Development and Tourism.

== Election results ==
Selangor State Legislative Assembly
Year	Constituency	Candidate	Votes	Pct	Opponent(s)	Votes	Pct	Ballots cast	Majority	Turnout
1999	N05 Sekinchan	Ng Suee Lim (DAP)	3,728	37.31%	Chia Kim Lem (MCA)	5,772	57.77%	10,406	2,044	71.67%
1999	N05 Sekinchan	Ng Suee Lim (DAP)	3,728	37.31%	Saari Kiban (IND)	492	4.92%	10,406	2,044	71.67%
2004	N04 Sekinchan	Ng Suee Lim (DAP)	4,903	51.82%	Chia Kim Lem (MCA)	4,559	48.18%	9,848	344	76.05%
2008	N04 Sekinchan	Ng Suee Lim (DAP)	5,403	50.89%	Puah Boon Choon (MCA)	5,213	49.11%	11,021	190	81.20%
2013	N04 Sekinchan	Ng Suee Lim (DAP)	8,107	58.01%	Kek Seng Hooi (MCA)	5,868	41.99%	14,274	2,239	88.10%
2018	N04 Sekinchan	Ng Suee Lim (DAP)	7,863	51.62%	Lee Yee Yuan (MCA)	5,019	32.95%	15,475	2,844	85.50%
2018	N04 Sekinchan	Ng Suee Lim (DAP)	7,863	51.62%	Mohd Fadzin Taslimin (PAS)	2,351	15.43%	15,475	2,844	85.50%
2023	N04 Sekinchan	Ng Suee Lim (DAP)	10,232	62.22%	Goh Gaik Meng (BERSATU)	6,214	37.78%	16,628	4,018	69.47%

== Honours ==
- Selangor
  - Knight Commander of the Order of the Crown of Selangor (DPMS) – Dato' (2023)
