= Lau Weng San =

Malaysian politician and engineer

Yang Berhormat Tuan Lau Weng San
- 刘永山

12th Speaker of the Selangor State Legislative Assembly
- Incumbent
- Assumed office 19 September 2023
- Monarch: Sharafuddin
- Menteri Besar: Amirudin Shari
- Deputy: Mohd Kamri Kamaruddin
- Preceded by: Ng Suee Lim
- Constituency: Non-MLA

Member of the Selangor State Legislative Assembly for Banting
- In office 9 May 2018 – 12 August 2023
- Preceded by: Fatimah Suhaimi (BN–UMNO)
- Succeeded by: Papparaidu Veraman (PH–DAP)
- Majority: 17,299 (2018)

Member of the Selangor State Legislative Assembly for Kampung Tunku
- In office 8 March 2008 – 9 May 2018
- Preceded by: Wong Sai Hou (BN–MCA)
- Succeeded by: Lim Yi Wei (PH–DAP)
- Majority: 7,977 (2008); 13,685 (2013)

Personal details
- Born: Lau Weng San; 12 February 1978 (age 48) Ipoh, Perak, Malaysia
- Citizenship: Malaysian
- Party: Democratic Action Party (DAP)
- Other political affiliations: Barisan Alternatif (BA) (1999–2004); Pakatan Rakyat (PR) (2008–2015); Pakatan Harapan (PH) (since 2015)
- Spouse: (曾舒渝)
- Children: 2 sons and 1 daughter
- Education: Sam Tet National Type Secondary School
- Alma mater: University of Malaya (Bachelor of Engineering in Chemistry & Bachelor of Laws)
- Occupation: Politician
- Profession: Process and petrochemical engineer (petroleum and gas)
- Website: wengsan.blogspot.com

Lau Weng San

Chinese name
- Traditional Chinese: 劉永山
- Simplified Chinese: 刘永山
Transcriptions
Standard Mandarin
- Hanyu Pinyin: Liú Yǒngshān

Lau Weng San (Chinese: 刘永山; pinyin: Liú Yǒngshān; born 12 February 1978) is a Malaysian politician and engineer who has served as 12th Speaker of the Selangor State Legislative Assembly since September 2023. He served as Member of the Selangor State Legislative Assembly (MLA) for Banting from May 2018 to August 2023 and for Kampung Tunku from March 2008 to May 2018. He is a member and State Organising Secretary of Selangor of the Democratic Action Party (DAP), a component party of the Pakatan Harapan (PH) and formerly Pakatan Rakyat (PR) as well as Barisan Alternatif (BA) coalitions. He was also the Political Secretary to the Secretary-General of DAP Lim Guan Eng from 2005 to 2008 and State Treasurer of DAP of Selangor. He is also the first non-MLA to become the Selangor Speaker since 2008 and the second in the history of the state after Onn Ismail.

== Political career ==
=== Member of the Selangor State Legislative Assembly (2008–2023) ===
==== 2008 Selangor state election ====
In the 2008 Selangor state election, Lau made his electoral debut after being nominated by PR to contest for the Kampung Tunku state seat. Lau won the seat and was elected to the Selangor State Legislative Assembly as the Kampung Tunku MLA for the first term after defeating Sheah Kok Fah of Barisan Nasional (BN) by a majority of 7,977 votes.

==== 2013 Selangor state election ====
In the 2013 Selangor state election, Lau was renominated by PR to defend the Kampung Tunku seat. Lau defended the seat and was reelected to the Selangor State Legislative Assembly as the Kampung Tunku MLA for the second term after defeating Kelvin Chong Seng Foo of BN by a majority of 13,685 votes.

==== 2018 Selangor state election ====
In the 2018 Selangor state election, Lau was renominated by PH to contest for the Banting seat instead of defending the Kampung Tunku seat. Lau won the seat and was reelected to the Selangor State Legislative Assembly as the Banting MLA for the first term after defeating Ng Siok Hwa of BN and Philip Tan Choon Swee of Parti Rakyat Malaysia (PRM) by a majority of 17,299 votes.

==== 2023 Selangor state election ====
In the 2023 Selangor state election, Lau was not renominated by PH to defend the Banting seat and contest other seats.

==== Question of dissatisfaction of the Selangor BN MLAs, dispute of the appointment of the Selangor State Secretary and signature drive to seek an auxiliary police unit ====
He questioned the dissatisfaction of the Selangor BN MLAs of the rejection of the Speaker of the Selangor State Legislative Assembly Hannah Yeoh Tseow Suan in the proposed amendment to empower the Syariah Court. He also disputed the appointment of the Director of the Selangor Islamic Religious Department (JAIS) Mohd Khusrin Munawi as the new Selangor State Secretary. In addition, he created a signature drive and aimed for 100,000 signatures to seek an auxiliary police unit in Petaling Jaya during his term as the Selangor MLA.

=== Speaker of the Selangor State Legislative Assembly (since 2023) ===
On 24 July 2023, Minister of Transport and Secretary-General of DAP Anthony Loke Siew Fook revealed that the party would nominate Lau for the position of the Speaker of the Selangor State Legislative Assembly in exchange for the party not to defend the Dusun Tua state seat and allowing it to be contested by the BN and United Malays National Organisation (UMNO) instead in the spirit of political and electoral cooperation between PH and BN should they win the 2023 Selangor state election and form the next state administration for the term of the 15th Selangor State Legislative Assembly. On 19 September 2023, Lau was nominated by Menteri Besar as well as Sungai Tua MLA Amirudin Shari and seconded by EXCO Member as well as Banting MLA Papparaidu Veraman as the 12th Speaker of the Selangor State Legislative Assembly. He was elected and sworn into office after winning the election with 34 votes, defeating the candidate nominated and seconded by PN who lost the election with 22 votes. After his election as the Speaker, he also swore Bukit Antarabangsa MLA Mohd Kamri Kamaruddin as the Deputy Speaker. The Malaysian United Indigenous Party (BERSATU) amended its party constitution, its State Chairman of Selangor Azmin Ali met Lau and handed in him a notice of the BERSATU membership termination of Abdul Rashid, formally informing Lau that Abdul Rashid had ceased to be a BERSATU member and had therefore breached the anti-party hopping law. Lau decided against vacating the Selat Kelang state seat held by Opposition MLA Abdul Rashid Asari who declared support for the government and Menteri Besar Amirudin, as he did not consider the declaration as an act of party-hopping.

== Personal life ==
Lau is married to his wife and they have 3 children who are 2 sons and 1 daughter.

== Election results ==
Selangor State Legislative Assembly
Year	Constituency	Candidate	Votes	Pct	Opponent(s)	Votes	Pct	Ballots cast	Majority	Turnout
2008	N35 Kampung Tunku	Lau Weng San (DAP)	14,633	68.74%	Sheah Kok Fah (MCA)	6,656	31.26%	21,537	7,977	71.35%
2013	N35 Kampung Tunku	Lau Weng San (DAP)	19,762	76.48%	Kelvin Chong Seng Foo (MCA)	6,077	23.52%	26,073	13,685	81.46%
2018	N52 Banting	Lau Weng San (DAP)	21,846	81.81%	Ng Siok Hwa (MCA)	4,547	17.03%	26,704	17,299	87.55%
2018	N52 Banting	Lau Weng San (DAP)	21,846	81.81%	Philip Tan Choon Swee (PRM)	311	1.16%	26,704	17,299	87.55%
