= Lim Yi Wei =

Malaysian politician (born 1989)

Yang Berhormat Puan Lim Yi Wei MLA
- 林怡威

Member of the Selangor State Legislative Assembly for Kampung Tunku
- Incumbent
- Assumed office 9 May 2018
- Preceded by: Lau Weng San
- Majority: 30,444 (2018); 30,378 (2023)

Personal details
- Born: 1989 (age 36–37) Ipoh, Perak, Malaysia
- Party: Democratic Action Party (DAP)
- Other political affiliations: Pakatan Harapan (PH)
- Alma mater: Hong Kong University of Science and Technology (BBA)
- Occupation: Politician

Lim Yi Wei (Chinese: 林怡威; born 1989) is a Malaysian politician of the Democratic Action Party (DAP) who has represented Kampung Tunku in the Selangor State Legislative Assembly since May 2018. She was re-elected in the 2023 Selangor state election. Before entering the assembly, she was a political secretary to Tony Pua and a councillor of the Petaling Jaya City Council.

Beyond legislative work, Lim was elected the first woman president of the Selangor Rugby Union in February 2024 for the 2024–2026 term. In 2026, she served as chef de mission of Selangor's contingent at the Para SUKMA Games.

== Early life and education ==
Lim was born in Ipoh, Perak, to parents who worked as teachers in Malaysian public schools. She studied at SMK (P) Methodist in Ipoh and subsequently undertook Sijil Tinggi Persekolahan Malaysia (STPM) studies at Methodist (ACS) Ipoh. She studied finance at the Hong Kong University of Science and Technology (HKUST), graduating with a Bachelor of Business Administration in 2013.

From January 2014 to December 2015, she worked as a conference producer in Hong Kong for Incisive Media Financial Publishing. Her work there included financial-sector events. She has said that her experience of the 2014 Umbrella Movement influenced her subsequent decision to enter Malaysian politics.

== Political career ==
=== Political secretary and local councillor (2016–2018) ===
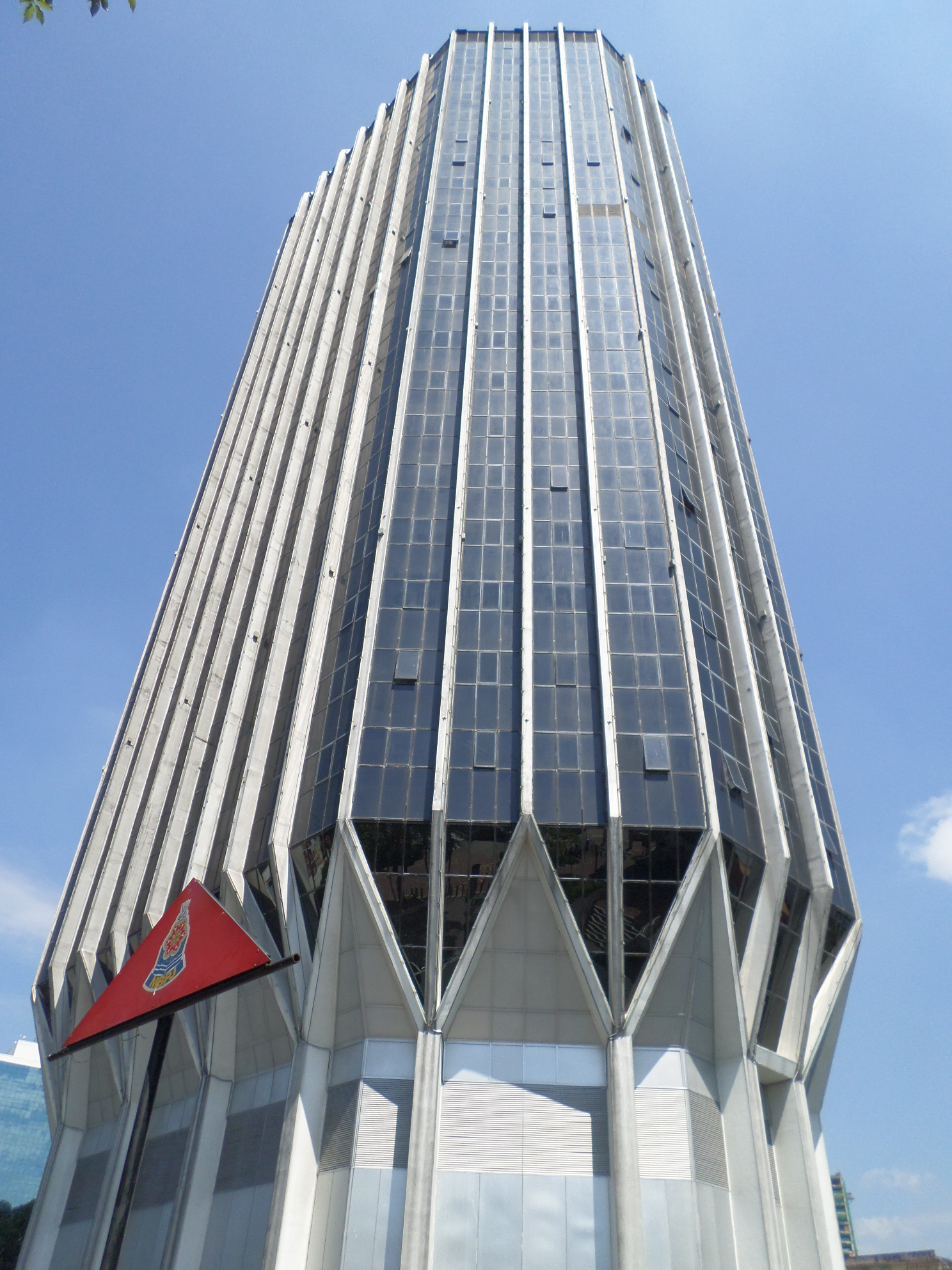
The Petaling Jaya City Council building. Lim served as a city councillor from 2016 to 2018.

Lim returned to Malaysia in 2016. From February 2016 until April 2018 she served as political secretary to Tony Pua, then member of parliament for Petaling Jaya Utara. From September 2016 to April 2018 she was a councillor of the Petaling Jaya City Council (MBPJ).

=== Member of the Selangor State Legislative Assembly (2018–present) ===
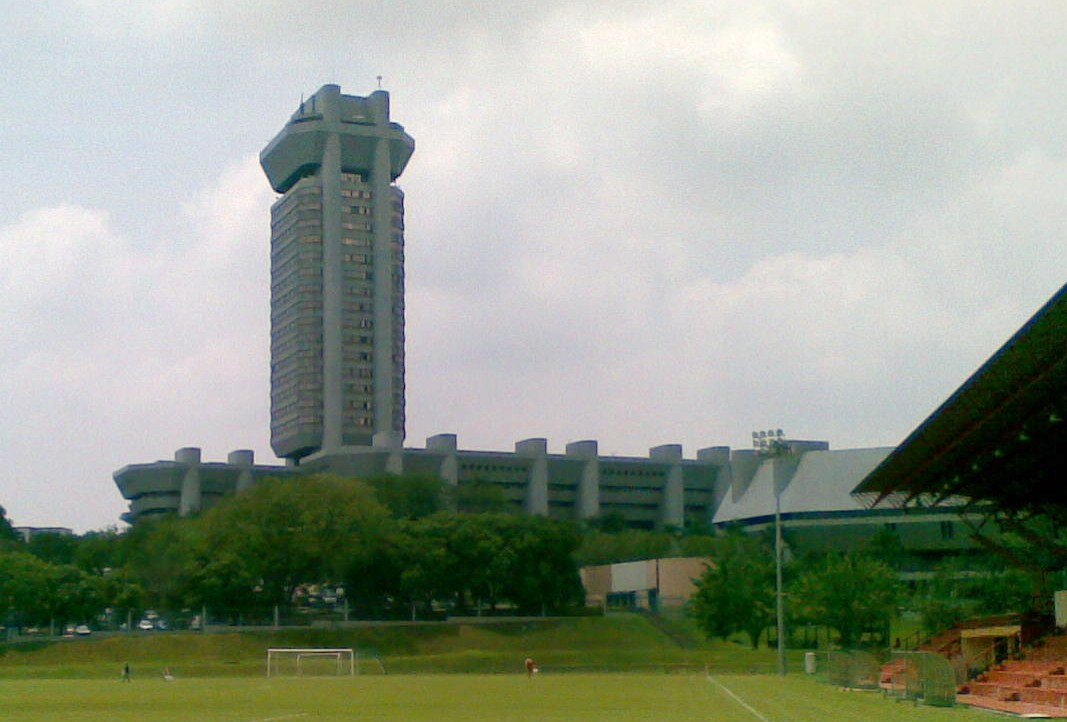
The Sultan Salahuddin Abdul Aziz Shah Building in Shah Alam houses the Selangor State Legislative Assembly.

At the 2018 Selangor state election, Lim was elected for Kampung Tunku on a DAP–Pakatan Harapan ticket, succeeding DAP assembly member Lau Weng San. She received 34,477 votes against 4,033 for Malaysian Chinese Association candidate Tan Gim Tuan, giving her a majority of 30,444 votes.

Lim was re-elected at the 2023 Selangor state election on 12 August 2023. She polled 33,745 votes compared with 3,367 for Perikatan Nasional candidate Chin Yoke Kheng (also known as Ruby Chin), a majority of 30,378. Bernama recorded turnout of 63.96 per cent in the constituency.

A 2022 Commonwealth Parliamentary Association (CPA) programme booklet identified Lim as a member of the Selangor assembly's Public Accounts Committee. She attended the CPA Parliamentary Academy's Advanced Parliamentary Development Residency in Sydney in May 2022.

=== Mental-health policy and legal reform ===
Lim has been involved in advocacy on mental-health services and access to legal assistance. On 8 July 2020, Lim and fellow assembly member Michelle Ng met officials of the Malaysian Bar to discuss shortcomings in legal representation and options for a Selangor legal-aid fund. During the meeting, Lim cited obstacles faced by survivors of domestic violence seeking police assistance during Malaysia's movement control order.

In October 2022, Lim publicly proposed additional state funding for mental-health treatment, including subsidies for an initial specialist consultation and medication. Selangor launched a SEHAT specialist-treatment subsidy in November 2022 with an allocation of RM222,600 for 700 psychiatric treatment slots; the initiative was administered by the state government through medical and clinic partners.

In December 2022, Lim joined Ng and Bandar Kuching MP Kelvin Yii in calling for the repeal of Section 309 of Malaysia's Penal Code, which then criminalised attempted suicide. The three also urged a temporary moratorium on prosecutions while the law was being revised. They met Deputy Law Minister Ramkarpal Singh on 22 December 2022 to discuss the proposed change.

In a 2024 Selangor assembly question about the SEHAT programme, Lim sought figures on patients receiving subsidised psychiatric medicine and the public cost of the scheme. The state government's response said that, as of 13 February 2024, 70 patients had received treatment under the then-current quota of 190, with medicine expenditure of RM5,100.30 for those patients.

=== Constituency development and public facilities ===
Lim's constituency includes parts of Petaling Jaya such as SS2, Sea Park, Paramount Garden and Sungai Way. Her constituency work has included community infrastructure, local heritage, business activity and urban-poverty issues.

In January 2023, a history corridor at the Sungai Way New Village community hall was reported to have opened in a refurbished former parking area. Lim said the concept had been proposed in 2019 to mark the new village's 70th anniversary. The corridor displayed more than 200 historical objects, mostly donated by residents; the reported renovation expenditure was approximately RM100,000, with contributions from the city council and other sponsors.

Lim was involved in the PJ Startup Festival, a local event bringing technology companies, business founders and students together. In March 2023 she discussed the festival's focus on business resilience after the COVID-19 pandemic, including applications of digital technology to food security.

In 2024, a 250-metre walking path at the park on Jalan SS2/48 was upgraded under the Projek Selangor Penyayang infrastructure programme at a reported cost of RM81,700. Lim said the work was intended to improve accessibility and walking conditions, particularly for older residents.

In May 2026, she called on the federal and Selangor governments to secure funding and complete land-use arrangements for a proposed public hospital in Petaling Jaya. Her proposals included zoning the selected land for healthcare facilities and incorporating the project into federal development and budget plans.

In June 2026, Lim described efforts to identify households facing urban poverty in Kampung Tunku and to assist residents with applications for state support. She also discussed initiatives serving an ageing constituency, including digital-literacy classes for older people, health outreach and age-friendly public infrastructure.

=== Party roles and political commentary ===
Lim has held positions within DAP and its youth and women's organisations, including international secretary of Democratic Action Party Socialist Youth (DAPSY) and assistant publicity secretary of the party's national women's wing. She was identified as the latter in January 2026; the DAP's published 2026–2029 women's-wing committee instead lists Jamaliah Jamaluddin in that post.

In an opinion article published by Malay Mail in December 2025, Lim argued that DAP should give greater weight to its social-democratic principles, including labour bargaining power, wealth taxation and structural economic reform. She expanded on these arguments during a January 2026 interview on BFM 89.9. These views were her political positions rather than official DAP policy.

== Sports administration ==
=== Selangor Rugby Union presidency (2024–2026 term) ===
On 3 February 2024, Lim was elected president of the Selangor Rugby Union, becoming the first woman to head the association. Nominated by the Combined Old Boys Rugby Association (Cobra), she won the position uncontested for the 2024–2026 term. She had played rugby while at HKUST and had taken part in initiatives to develop women's rugby in Selangor. At the time of her election, she said she intended to develop school and club participation and improve the state's performance in domestic competitions.

The Selangor State Sports Council's published management-board list identifies Lim as president of the rugby union and a member of the council's management board.

=== Para SUKMA 2026 ===
On 10 February 2026, Lim was announced as chef de mission of the Selangor team for the 2026 Malaysia Para Games, with two local-government leaders appointed as deputies. During preparations for the September games, she discussed athlete welfare, training facilities and recruiting additional para-athletes, including women. Selangor set a target of 60 gold medals before the competition.

Selangor finished the September 2026 games with 93 gold, 55 silver and 52 bronze medals, leading the overall medal table. These results refer to the state contingent as a whole, not to an individual sporting performance by Lim.

== International programmes ==
In 2018, Lim participated in a United States legislative exchange under the Young Southeast Asian Leaders Initiative (YSEALI) professional fellows programme. A Massachusetts Senate journal dated 8 November 2018 records that she was introduced to the chamber as a visiting Malaysian state assembly member who had been working with state senator Jamie Eldridge on youth political engagement, civic education and economic empowerment.

She also participated in a Commonwealth Parliamentary Association Advanced Parliamentary Development Residency in Sydney in May 2022.

== Election results ==
Elections to the Selangor State Legislative Assembly (Kampung Tunku)
Year	Lim Yi Wei (DAP/PH)	Nearest opposing candidate	Opponent's votes	Majority
2018	34,477 (89.53%)	Tan Gim Tuan (MCA/BN)	4,033 (10.47%)	30,444
2023	33,745 (90.93%)	Chin Yoke Kheng, also known as Ruby Chin (BERSATU/PN)	3,367 (9.07%)	30,378
