= Green Party of Malaysia =

Political party of Malaysia

- Abbreviation: PHM
- General Secretary: Abdul Razak Ismail
- Founded: 2010
- Membership: 5,000 (Claimed)
- Ideology: Green politics Anti-corruption; Environmentalism; Multiracialism
- Political position: Centre-left
- Regional affiliation: Himpunan Hijau
- International affiliation: Greens International
- Slogan: "Pilihan Di Tangan Kita!" The Choice is Ours!

The Green Party of Malaysia (Malay: Parti Hijau Malaysia) is a political party in Malaysia with an environmentalism focus. It was formed in 2010 as a virtual movement. Founder Azlan Adnan's original intent was to empower and unite all Environmental NGOs (ENGOs) in Malaysia and to push the green agenda into the Malaysian political consciousness. The party is affiliated with Himpunan Hijau with more than 80 NGO's. The party was initially anti-Barisan Nasional but over the years have become more divergent and is more critical of both Barisan Nasional and Pakatan Harapan.

As of 2022, the party had not contested in any elections on the national and statewide level. Abdul Razak Ismail announced the party would contest in the 2023 Selangor state election. However, as of March 2024, the party had yet to have its registration approved.

== See also ==
- Green party
- Asia Pacific Greens Federation
