= Onn Ismail =

Malaysian politician

Yang Berbahagia Tan Sri Dato' Seri Onn Ismail PSM SSSA DPMS SMS JMN KMN PJK

8th Speaker of the Selangor State Legislative Assembly
- In office 18 May 1995 – 22 April 2008
- Preceded by: Zainal Dahalan (BN–UMNO)
- Succeeded by: Teng Chang Khim (PR–DAP)
- Constituency: Selat Klang (1986–1999); Non-MLA

Member of the Selangor State Legislative Assembly for Selat Klang
- In office 1986–1999
- Preceded by: Ng Boon Thong @ Ng Thian Hock (BN–MCA) (as MLA for Selat Kelang)
- Succeeded by: Zakaria Deros (BN–UMNO)
- Majority: 5,433 (1986); 4,592 (1990); 9,392 (1995)

Member of the Selangor State Legislative Assembly for Sementa
- In office 1974–1986
- Preceded by: Chua Kow Eng (DAP)
- Succeeded by: Md Amin Abd Moin (BN–UMNO)
- Majority: 3,329 (1974); 4,706 (1978); 7,071 (1982)

Personal details
- Born: 1939 Kuala Selangor, Selangor, Federated Malay States (now Malaysia)
- Died: 5 April 2023 (aged 83–84) Kampung Raja Uda, Pelabuhan Klang
- Resting place: Tanah Perkuburan Islam Kampung Raja Uda, Pelabuhan Klang

Haji Onn bin Ismail (1939–5 April 2023) was a Malaysian politician who served as Speaker of the Selangor State Legislative Assembly from 1995 to 2008, Member of the Selangor State Legislative Assembly for Sementa seat from 1974 to 1986 and Selat Klang from 1986 to 1999. He was a member of United Malays National Organisation, a component party of Barisan Nasional (BN).

== Early life ==
His parents had 16 children, but eight of them died during the Japanese occupation (1941–1945) because there was not enough food. Only eight were left and Onn Ismail is the second youngest child. He was married and has six children, three boys and three girls, including Senator Norhayati Onn.

== Family ==
Her ex-husband is Mohd Suffian Abdul Aziz.

His son-in-law is Faizal Abdullah, former Kapar UMNO Youth Leader and CEO of Wijaya Baru Global Bhd. Faizal was once a member of the Klang Port Council and was involved in the controversy of not having house plans approved together with Zakaria Deros and Mazlynoor Abdul Latiff. The bungalow was built in Kampung Raja Uda without plan approval. As a result, the then Menteri Besar of Selangor, Khir Toyo asked Faizal to resign as a council member.

== Political career ==
Onn Ismail made his first electoral debut in 1974 Sementa seat and won. When he was Speaker of the Selangor State Assembly in 2003, he once called the police to bring out Teng Chang Khim MLA for Sungai Pinang. Teng was not satisfied because the motion he brought was rejected. Teng was suspended for 6 months for refusing to "politely apologise" following an incident in 2005 when he threw a book of the Standing Rules of the Meeting into the wastebasket.

== Selangor cowboy ==
'Selangor cowboy' became a nickname for Onn Ismail in the 1980s. During a section meeting, a group of people beat up three people because of a disagreement. He fired a shot on top of the meeting tent. The group also ran because they were reminded that the police were coming to raid. That action was able to save three people who were almost paralyzed by almost 30 people. The incident was in the newspaper. When the Sultan of Selangor, Sultan Salahuddin Abdul Aziz Shah called himself 'this is the Cowboy of Selangor'! like the popular drama at that time 'The High Chaparral'.

== Death ==
Onn Ismail died on 5 April 2023 at his son's residence in Kampung Raja Uda, Pelabuhan Klang.

== Election results ==
Selangor State Legislative Assembly
Year	Constituency	Candidate	Votes	Pct	Opponent(s)	Votes	Pct	Ballots cast	Majority	Turnout
1974	N20 Sementa	Onn Ismail (UMNO)	3,954	78.36%	A. V. Kathiah (PEKEMAS)	625	12.39%		3,329	
1974	N20 Sementa	Onn Ismail (UMNO)	3,954	78.36%	Abdul Aziz Ismail (DAP)	467	9.25%		3,329	
1978	N20 Sementa	Onn Ismail (UMNO)	6,890	75.93%	Dahalan Rezwan (PAS)	2,184	24.07%		4,706	
1982	N20 Sementa	Onn Ismail (UMNO)	9,054	73.84%	Zainudin Rawi (PAS)	1,983	16.17%	12,475	7,071	73.53%
1982	N20 Sementa	Onn Ismail (UMNO)	9,054	73.84%	Hussin Kussan (DAP)	1,225	9.99%	12,475	7,071	73.53%
1986	N15 Selat Klang	Onn Ismail (UMNO)	8,851	72.14%	Aziz Hamzah (PAS)	3,418	27.86%	12,740	5,433	65.23%
1990	N15 Selat Klang	Onn Ismail (UMNO)	10,020	64.86%	Aziz Hamzah (PAS)	5,428	35.14%	16,001	4,592	69.36%
1995	N40 Selat Klang	Onn Ismail (UMNO)	12,479	80.17%	Mohd. Ismath Habib Mohamad (PAS)	3,087	19.83%	16,047	9,392	68.82%

== Honours ==
- Malaysia
  - Officer of the Order of the Defender of the Realm (KMN) (1984)
  - Companion of the Order of the Defender of the Realm (JMN) (1989)
  - Commander of the Order of Loyalty to the Crown of Malaysia (PSM) – Tan Sri (2005)
- Selangor
  - Recipient of the Meritorious Service Medal (PJK)
  - Companion of the Order of the Crown of Selangor (SMS) (1980)
  - Knight Commander of the Order of the Crown of Selangor (DPMS) – Dato' (1988)
  - Knight Grand Companion of the Order of Sultan Salahuddin Abdul Aziz Shah (SSSA) – Dato' Seri (1999)
