= 2023 Selangor state election =

Malaysian state election

- 12 August 2023

All 56 seats in the Selangor State Legislative Assembly 29 seats needed for a majority
- Turnout: 72.00%
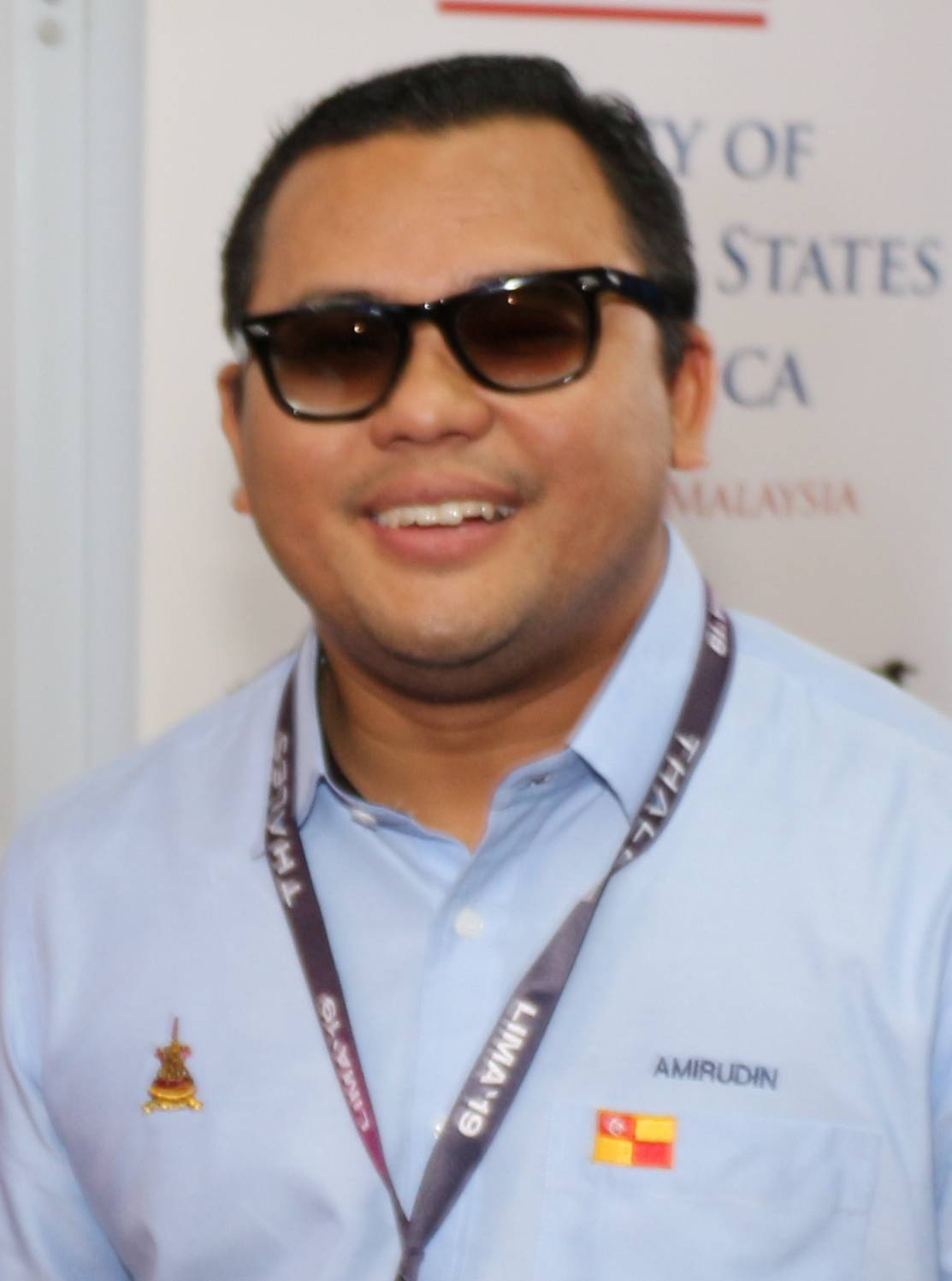

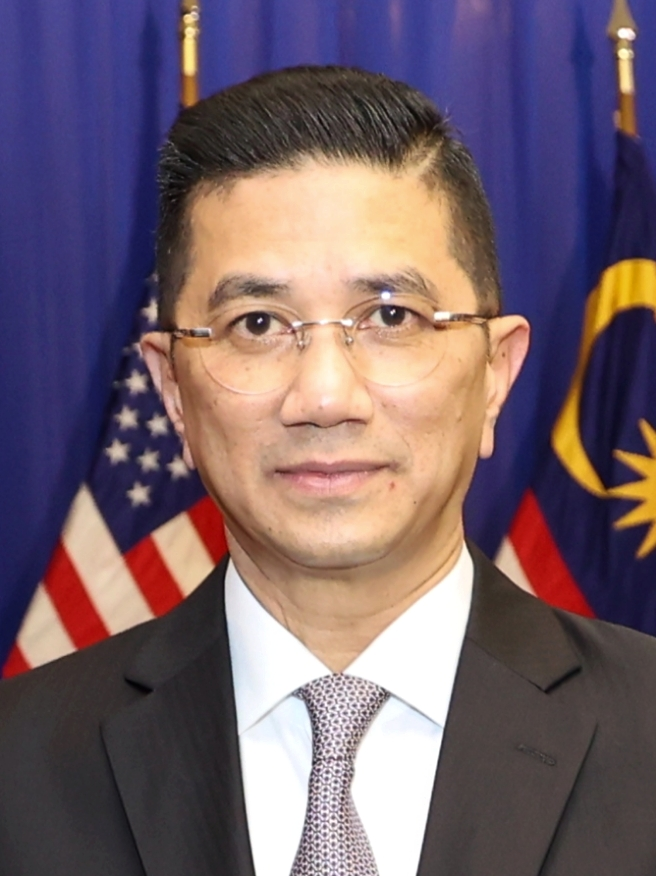
	Majority party	Minority party
Leader	Amirudin Shari; Megat Zulkarnain Omardin	Azmin Ali
Party	PKR; UMNO	BERSATU
Alliance	Pakatan Harapan; Barisan Nasional Parties: PKR; DAP; AMANAH; UMNO	Perikatan Nasional Parties: BERSATU; PAS; GERAKAN
Leader since	6 March 2020; 25 November 2022	5 January 2021
Leader's seat	Amirudin: Sungai Tua; Megat Zulkarnain: Stood in Gombak Setia (defeated)	Hulu Kelang
Last election	49 seats, 78.68% (Note: Total seats won by parties currently in PH and BN. PH's current composition won 45 seats and BN's won 4; vote tally includes MIC and MCA even though they are not contesting this election as they are still part of BN.)	7 seats, 20.53% (Note: New coalition formed in 2020. These numbers are the total seats and vote share of BERSATU, PAS and GERAKAN in the last election. The parties were previously part of Pakatan Harapan, Gagasan Sejahtera and Barisan Nasional.)
Seats before	45	5
Seats won	34	22
Seat change	▼11	▲17
Popular vote	1,621,955	1,012,647
Percentage	60.54%	37.80%
Swing	▼18.14%	▲17.27%
Menteri Besar Selangor before election
Amirudin Shari
Pakatan Harapan
(PKR)
Menteri Besar Selangor after election
Amirudin Shari
Pakatan Harapan
(PKR)

The 15th Selangor state election were held on 12 August 2023 to elect the State Assembly members of the 15th Selangor State Legislative Assembly, the legislature of the Malaysian state of Selangor.

Selangor is one of the states which did not dissolve simultaneously with Dewan Rakyat on 10 October 2022. It was decided by Pakatan Harapan on 15 October 2022.

The Barisan Nasional (BN) – Pakatan Harapan (PH) electoral pact won the election by capturing 34 of 56 seats, with PH winning a standalone majority of 32 seats and BN winning 2 seats. The Perikatan Nasional (PN) coalition won the remaining 22 seats to become the main opposition in the state assembly.

== Background ==
In the 2018 general election, Pakatan Harapan won the state of Selangor, winning 51 out of the 56 state seats. Despite various changes at the beginning of the 2020–2022 Malaysian political crisis, it did not affect the politics at the state level, allowing the Pakatan Harapan state government to continue to govern.

On 6 August 2020, the Chief Minister of Penang, Chow Kon Yeow, reiterated his stance that all states that have a Pakatan Harapan government, including Selangor, would not dissolve the state assemblies in order to coincide with a snap general election. This was because at the time, the Penang, Selangor and Negeri Sembilan state governments had a stable majority. The Pakatan Harapan leadership further emphasized that there will not be a dissolution in 2021 and 2022, citing various factors, such as the ongoing COVID-19 pandemic, the need for the state governments to complete a full term, and the possibility of various factors which might inconvenience people should the state elections be called at the wrong time, such as floods, ahead of the 2022 Malaysian general election.

On 10 October 2022, Malaysian Prime Minister Ismail Sabri Yaakob dissolved Parliament, resulting in a snap general election being held in Malaysia on 19 November 2022. Traditionally, every state in Malaysia except Sarawak would hold their state elections concurrently with the general election for the sake of convenience, but since 2020, several Malaysian states held state elections separately from the general election, with Sabah on 26 September 2020, Melaka on 20 November 2021, Sarawak on 18 December 2021 and Johor on 12 March 2022. With the exception of Perlis, Perak and Pahang holding state elections during the 2022 Malaysian general election, all other states, including Selangor, will hold their state elections in 2023.

== Constituencies ==
All 56 constituencies within Selangor, which constitute the Selangor State Legislative Assembly, were contested during the election.

Electoral map of Selangor, showing all 36 constituencies

Breakdown of 2022 Malaysian general election result by state constituency in 2022, where PH in Red, PN in Blue-green and BN in blue

== Composition before dissolution ==
Government + Confidence and supply						Opposition
PH			BN	WARISAN	PBM	PN		PEJUANG
40			5	1	2	5		3
19	15	6	5	1	2	4	1	3
PKR	DAP	AMANAH	UMNO	WARISAN	PBM	BERSATU	PAS	PEJUANG

== Timeline ==
The key dates are listed below.

Date	Event
15 October 2022	Pakatan Harapan Presidential Council decides not to dissolve the 14th Selangor State Legislative Assembly.
23 June 2023	Dissolution of the Selangor State Legislative Assembly.
5 July 2023	Issue of the Writ of Election
29 July 2023	Nomination Day
29 July–11 August 2023	Campaigning Period
8–11 August 2023	Early Polling Day For Postal, Overseas and Advance Voters
12 August 2023	Polling Day

== Retiring incumbent ==
The following members of the 14th State Legislative Assembly have said that they do not intend to seek re-election.

No.	State Constituency	Departing MLA	Coalition (Party)	Date confirmed	First elected	Reason
N45	Bandar Baru Klang	Teng Chang Khim	PH (DAP)	2 December 2020	1999	Retired from politics.
N56	Sungai Pelek	Ronnie Liu Tian Khiew	PH (DAP)	16 March 2023	2008	Not seeking re-election.
N50	Kota Kemuning	Ganabatirau Veraman	PH (DAP)	31 May 2023	2013	Not contesting state election (MP for Klang).
N23	Dusun Tua	Edry Faizal Eddy Yusof	PH (DAP)	21 July 2023	2018	Swapped seat allocation with BN.
N28	Seri Kembangan	Ean Yong Hian Wah	PH (DAP)	23 July 2023	2008	Not seeking re-election.
N52	Banting	Lau Weng San	PH (DAP)	24 July 2023	2008	Dropped by party.
N41	Batu Tiga	Rodziah Ismail	PH (PKR)	20 June 2023	2008	Not contesting state election (MP for Ampang).
N02	Sabak	Ahmad Mustain Othman	PH (PKR)	20 June 2023	2018	Not seeking re-election.
N42	Meru	Mohd Fakhrulrazi Mokhtar	PH (PKR)	20 June 2023	2018	Not seeking re-election.
N11	Ijok	Idris Ahmad	PH (PKR)	21 June 2023	2013	Not seeking re-election.
N9	Permatang	Rozana Zainal Abidin	PH (PKR)	23 July 2023	2018	Dropped by party.
N25	Kajang	Hee Loy Sian	PH (PKR)	23 July 2023	2018	Dropped by party.
N32	Seri Setia	Halimey Abu Bakar	PH (PKR)	23 July 2023	2018	Dropped by party.
N33	Taman Medan	Syamsul Firdaus Mohamed Supri	PH (PKR)	23 July 2023	2018	Dropped by party.
N37	Bukit Lanjan	Elizabeth Wong Keat Ping	PH (PKR)	23 July 2023	2008	Dropped by party.
N39	Kota Damansara	Shatiri Mansor	PH (PKR)	23 July 2023	2018	Dropped by party.
N15	Taman Templer	Mohd Sany Hamzan	PH (AMANAH)	21 May 2023	2018	Not contesting state election (MP for Hulu Langat).
N18	Hulu Kelang	Saari Sungib	PH (AMANAH)	14 June 2023	2008	Not seeking re-election.
N29	Seri Serdang	Siti Mariah Mahmud	PH (AMANAH)	16 June 2023	2018	Not seeking re-election.
N5	Hulu Bernam	Rosni Sohar	BN (UMNO)	21 July 2023	2013	Swapped seat allocation with PH.
N8	Sungai Burong	Mohd Shamsudin Lias	BN (UMNO)	21 July 2023	2004	Dropped by party.
N24	Semenyih	Zakaria Hanafi	BN (UMNO)	21 July 2023	2019	Dropped by party.
N55	Dengkil	Adhif Syan Abdullah	PN (BERSATU)	16 June 2023	2018	Dropped by party.
N22	Teratai	Bryan Lai Wai Chong	WARISAN	17 March 2023	2018	Incumbent's party not contesting election.
N20	Lembah Jaya	Haniza Mohamed Talha	PBM	18 March 2023	2008	Incumbent's party not contesting election.
N43	Sementa	Daroyah Alwi	PBM	18 March 2023	2013	Incumbent's party not contesting election.
N7	Batang Kali	Harumaini Omar	PEJUANG	16 February 2023	2018	Incumbent's party not contesting election.
N12	Jeram	Mohd Shaid Rosli	PEJUANG	22 July 2023	2018	Incumbent's party not contesting election.

== Electoral candidates ==
Names in bold are the confirmed winners in the 2023 state election.

No.	Parliamentary Constituency	No.	State Constituency	Voters	Incumbent State Assemblymen	Coalition (Party)	Political coalitions and parties							
No.	Parliamentary Constituency	No.	State Constituency	Voters	Incumbent State Assemblymen	Coalition (Party)	Barisan Nasional + Pakatan Harapan (Perpaduan electoral pact)		Perikatan Nasional		MUDA + PSM electoral pact		Other parties/Independents	
No.	Parliamentary Constituency	No.	State Constituency	Voters	Incumbent State Assemblymen	Coalition (Party)	Candidate name	Party	Candidate name	Party	Candidate name	Party	Candidate name	Party
P092	Sabak Bernam	N01	Sungai Air Tawar	20,026	Rizam Ismail	**BN (UMNO)**	**Rizam Ismail**	UMNO	Mohamad Zaidi Selamat	BERSATU				
P092	Sabak Bernam	N02	Sabak	31,816	Ahmad Mustain Othman	**PH (PKR)**	Samad Hashim	AMANAH	**Sallehen Mukhyi**	PAS				
P093	Sungai Besar	N03	Sungai Panjang	40,786	Mohd Imran Tamrin	**BN (UMNO)**	Mohd Imran Tamrin	UMNO	**Mohd Razali Saari**	PAS				
P093	Sungai Besar	N04	Sekinchan	23,936	Ng Suee Lim	**PH (DAP)**	**Ng Suee Lim**	DAP	Goh Gaik Meng	BERSATU				
P094	Hulu Selangor	N05	Hulu Bernam	30,367	Rosni Sohar	**BN (UMNO)**	Mohd Amran Mohd Shakir	AMANAH	**Mui'zzuddeen Mahyuddin**	PAS				
P094	Hulu Selangor	N06	Kuala Kubu Baharu	40,015	Lee Kee Hiong	**PH (DAP)**	**Lee Kee Hiong**	DAP	Henry Teoh Kien Hong	GERAKAN	Sivaprakash Ramasamy	MUDA	Chng Boon Lai	PRM
P094	Hulu Selangor	N07	Batang Kali	86,282	Vacant (Note: The seat was won by Harumaini Omar in the 2018 Selangor state election as a candidate of Pakatan Harapan (BERSATU). He later exited the PH coalition and BERSATU in May 2020, and joined Parti Pejuang Tanahair (PEJUANG). Harumaini was vacated from his seat in an announcement by the Selangor state assembly Speaker Ng Suee Lim on 16 February 2023, due to prolonged absenteeism without notice from the Assembly sitting since 28 July 2022.)		Mohd Isa Abu Kasim	UMNO	**Muhammad Muhaimin Harith Abdullah Sani**	BERSATU				
P095	Tanjong Karang	N08	Sungai Burong	31,715	Mohd Shamsuddin Lias	**BN (UMNO)**	Mohamad Khir Ramli	UMNO	**Mohd Zamri Mohd Zainuldin**	PAS				
P095	Tanjong Karang	N09	Permatang	30,796	Rozana Zainal Abidin	**PH (PKR)**	Mohd. Yahya Mat Shari	PKR	**Nurul Syazwani Noh**	BERSATU				
P096	Kuala Selangor	N10	Bukit Melawati	37,956	Juwairiya Zulkifli	**PH (PKR)**	Thiban Subramaniam	PKR	**Noorazley Yahya**	BERSATU				
P096	Kuala Selangor	N11	Ijok	30,662	Idris Ahmad	**PH (PKR)**	Amidi Abdul Manan	PKR	**Jefri Mejan**	PAS			Tan Cat Keong	IND
P096	Kuala Selangor	N12	Jeram	36,707	Mohd Shaid Rosli	**PEJUANG**	Jahaya Ibrahim	UMNO	**Harrison Hassan**	BERSATU				
P097	Selayang	N13	Kuang	45,606	Sallehudin Amiruddin	**PEJUANG**	Hasnal Rezua Merican Habib Merican	UMNO	**Mohd Rafiq Mohd Abdullah**	BERSATU			Sallehudin Amiruddin	IND
P097	Selayang	N14	Rawang	76,841	Chua Wei Kiat	**PH (PKR)**	**Chua Wei Kiat**	PKR	Rejean Kumar Ratnam	BERSATU				
P097	Selayang	N15	Taman Templer	62,978	Mohd Sany Hamzan	**PH (AMANAH)**	**Anfaal Saari**	AMANAH	Zaidy Abdul Talib	PAS	Aida Nazeera Abd Rahman	MUDA		
P098	Gombak	N16	Sungai Tua	49,055	Amirudin Shari	**PH (PKR)**	**Amirudin Shari**	PKR	Muhammad Hanif Jamaludin	PAS			Suman Gopal	IND
P098	Gombak	N17	Gombak Setia	88,480	Muhammad Hilman Idham	**PN** (**BERSATU**)	Megat Zulkarnain Omardin	UMNO	**Muhammad Hilman Idham**	BERSATU			Mohd Salim Mohd Ali	IND
P098	Gombak	N18	Hulu Kelang	71,702	Saari Sungib	**PH (AMANAH)**	Juwairiya Zulkifli	PKR	**Azmin Ali**	BERSATU				
P099	Ampang	N19	Bukit Antarabangsa	69,501	Azmin Ali	**PN** (**BERSATU**)	**Mohd Kamri Kamaruddin**	PKR	Sasha Lyna Abdul Latif	BERSATU	Melanie Ting Yi-Hlin	MUDA		
P099	Ampang	N20	Lembah Jaya	65,650	Haniza Mohamed Talha	**PBM**	**Syed Ahmad Syed Abdul Rahman Alhadad**	PKR	Sharifah Haslizah Syed Ariffin	PAS				
P100	Pandan	N21	Pandan Indah	70,776	Izham Hashim	**PH (AMANAH)**	**Izham Hashim**	AMANAH	Fazil Mohamad Dali	BERSATU	Noor Faralisa Redzuan	MUDA	Sivaneswaran Ramasundram	IND
P100	Pandan	N22	Teratai	76,579	Lai Wai Chong	**WARISAN**	**Yew Jia Haur**	DAP	Chew Han Keai	BERSATU				
P101	Hulu Langat	N23	Dusun Tua	74,419	Edry Faizal Eddy Yusof	**PH (DAP)**	**Johan Abd Aziz**	UMNO	Azhar Hambali	BERSATU	Al Hafiz Ikhwan	MUDA		
P101	Hulu Langat	N24	Semenyih	97,300	Zakaria Hanafi	**BN (UMNO)**	Wan Zulaika Anua	UMNO	**Nushi Mahfodz**	PAS				
P102	Bangi	N25	Kajang	109,785	Hee Loy Sian	**PH (PKR)**	**David Cheong Kian Young**	PKR	Allan Liew Sin Kim	BERSATU	Arutchelvan Subramaniam	PSM		
P102	Bangi	N26	Sungai Ramal	97,415	Mazwan Johar	**PH (AMANAH)**	Mazwan Johar	AMANAH	**Mohd Shafie Ngah**	PAS				
P102	Bangi	N27	Balakong	104,269	Wong Siew Ki	**PH (DAP)**	**Wayne Ong Chun Wei**	DAP	Steven Lai Choon Wen	BERSATU				
P103	Puchong	N28	Seri Kembangan	62,822	Ean Yong Hian Wah	**PH (DAP)**	**Wong Siew Ki**	DAP	Ken Liau Wei Jian	BERSATU			Wong Jung Lik	IND
P103	Puchong	N29	Seri Serdang	93,235	Siti Mariah Mahmud	**PH (AMANAH)**	**Abbas Salimi Azmi**	AMANAH	Mohd Shukor Mustaffa	BERSATU	Amir Hariri Abdul Hadi	MUDA		
P104	Subang	N30	Kinrara	123,782	Ng Sze Han	**PH (DAP)**	**Ng Sze Han**	DAP	Wong Yong Kang	BERSATU				
P104	Subang	N31	Subang Jaya	111,970	Michelle Ng Mei Sze	**PH (DAP)**	**Michelle Ng Mei Sze**	DAP	Gana Pragasam Sebastian	BERSATU	Zayd Shaukat	MUDA		
P105	Petaling Jaya	N32	Seri Setia	80,371	Halimey Abu Bakar	**PH (PKR)**	**Mohammad Fahmi Ngah**	PKR	Muhd Zubir Embong	PAS	Dobby Chew	MUDA	Harindran Krishnan	IND
P105	Petaling Jaya	N33	Taman Medan	61,959	Syamsul Firdaus Mohamed Supri	**PH (PKR)**	Ahmad Akhir Pawan Chik	PKR	**Afif Bahardin**	BERSATU				
P105	Petaling Jaya	N34	Bukit Gasing	54,238	Rajiv Rishyakaran	**PH (DAP)**	**Rajiv Rishyakaran**	DAP	Nallan Dhanabalan	GERAKAN	Kalyana Rajasekaran Teagarajan	MUDA		
P106	Damansara	N35	Kampung Tunku	58,357	Lim Yi Wei	**PH (DAP)**	**Lim Yi Wei**	DAP	Chin Yoke Kheng	BERSATU				
P106	Damansara	N36	Bandar Utama	73,038	Jamaliah Jamaluddin	**PH (DAP)**	**Jamaliah Jamaluddin**	DAP	Nur Alif Mohd Tafid	GERAKAN	Abe Lim Hooi Sean	MUDA		
P106	Damansara	N37	Bukit Lanjan	110,583	Elizabeth Wong Keat Ping	**PH (PKR)**	**Pua Pei Ling**	PKR	Muniraa Abu Bakar	GERAKAN				
P107	Sungai Buloh	N38	Paya Jaras	72,563	Mohd Khairuddin Othman	**PH (PKR)**	Mohd Khairuddin Othman	PKR	**Ab Halim Tamuri**	PAS			Nurhaslinda Basri	IND
P107	Sungai Buloh	N39	Kota Damansara	90,130	Shatiri Mansor	**PH (PKR)**	**Muhammad Izuan Ahmad Kasim**	PKR	Mohd Radzlan Jalaludin	BERSATU	Sivarajan Arumugam	PSM		
P108	Shah Alam	N40	Kota Anggerik	95,104	Najwan Halimi	**PH (PKR)**	**Najwan Halimi**	PKR	Mohamed Sukri Omar	PAS	Azad Akbar Khan	MUDA		
P108	Shah Alam	N41	Batu Tiga	75,486	Rodziah Ismail	**PH (PKR)**	**Danial Al Rashid Haron Aminar Rashid**	AMANAH	Rina Harun	BERSATU	Syaidiyah Izzati Nur Razak Maideen	MUDA		
P109	Kapar	N42	Meru	65,801	Mohd Fakhrulrazi Mohd Mokhtar	**PH (PKR)**	**Mariam Abdul Rashid**	AMANAH	Hasnizam Adham	BERSATU	Sivaranjani Manickam	PSM		
P109	Kapar	N43	Sementa	68,969	Daroyah Alwi	**PBM**	Erni Afrishah Azizi	PKR	**Noor Najhan Mohamad Salleh**	PAS				
P109	Kapar	N44	Selat Klang	57,613	Abdul Rashid Asari	**PN** (**BERSATU**)	Roslee Abd Hamid	UMNO	**Abdul Rashid Asari**	BERSATU			Ezam Mohd Nor	PRM
P110	Klang	N45	Bandar Baru Klang	82,826	Teng Chang Khim	**PH (DAP)**	**Quah Perng Fei**	DAP	Tan Seng Huat	GERAKAN				
P110	Klang	N46	Pelabuhan Klang	51,907	Azmizam Zaman Huri	**PH (PKR)**	**Azmizam Zaman Huri**	PKR	Wan Hasrina Wan Hassan	PAS			Syed Ahmad Putra Syed Isa	PRM
P110	Klang	N47	Pandamaran	75,777	Tony Leong Tuck Chee	**PH (DAP)**	**Tony Leong Tuck Chee**	DAP	Gunalan Balakrishnan	BERSATU			Tan Kang Yap	PRM
P111	Kota Raja	N48	Sentosa	90,270	Gunarajah George	**PH (PKR)**	**Gunarajah George**	PKR	Parameswaran Ganason	GERAKAN	Thanusha Ramanieswaran	MUDA	Jeichandran Wadivelu	PRM
P111	Kota Raja	N49	Sungai Kandis	78,605	Zawawi Mughni	**PH (PKR)**	Zawawi Mughni	PKR	**Wan Dzahanurin Ahmad**	BERSATU	Arfiena Shaqira Sariff	MUDA		
P111	Kota Raja	N50	Kota Kemuning	81,946	Ganabatirau Veraman	**PH (DAP)**	**Preakas Sampunathan**	DAP	Jimmy Chew Jyh Gang	GERAKAN			K. Gunasekaran Kuppan	PRM
P112	Kuala Langat	N51	Sijangkang	62,907	Ahmad Yunus Hairi	**PN (PAS)**	Mohd Al-Hafizi Abu Bakar	UMNO	**Ahmad Yunus Hairi**	PAS				
P112	Kuala Langat	N52	Banting	44,972	Lau Weng San	**PH (DAP)**	**Papparaidu Veraman**	DAP	Saravanan Mutto Krishnan	GERAKAN			Ang Wei Yang	IND
P112	Kuala Langat	N53	Morib	43,828	Hasnul Baharuddin	**PH (AMANAH)**	Hasnul Baharuddin	AMANAH	**Rosnizan Ahmad**	BERSATU				
P113	Sepang	N54	Tanjong Sepat	32,312	Borhan Aman Shah	**PH (PKR)**	**Borhan Aman Shah**	PKR	Sabirin Marsono	PAS				
P113	Sepang	N55	Dengkil	93,931	Adhif Syan Abdullah	**PN (BERSATU)**	Noorazli Said	UMNO	**Jamil Salleh**	BERSATU	Darren Ong Chung Lee	PSM	Daud Leong	PUR
P113	Sepang	N56	Sungai Pelek	47,335	Ronnie Liu Tian Khiew	**PH (DAP)**	**Lwi Kian Keong**	DAP	Suhaimi Mohd Ghazali	BERSATU			Nageswaran Ravi	IND

== Opinion polls ==
Polling firm	Dates conducted	Sample size	PH+BN	PN	MUDA+PSM	Oth	Lead	Ref
Ilham Centre	29 July – 8 August 2023	2,304	55%	23%	–	22%	PH+BN +32%	
Merdeka Center	26 July – 11 August 2023	2,966	49%	36%	–	15%	PH+BN +13%	
Endeavour-MGC	12–18 June 2023	1,068	53%	37%	1%	9%	PH+BN +7%	

== Results ==
Results of the August 2023 Selangor state election, by party

State election results - Selangor 2023

Party or alliance		Votes	%	Seats	+/–
Pakatan Harapan + Barisan Nasional	Democratic Action Party Malaysia	582,881	21.46	15	–1
Pakatan Harapan + Barisan Nasional	People's Justice Party (Malaysia)	582,591	21.45	12	–9
Pakatan Harapan + Barisan Nasional	United Malays National Organisation	246,053	9.06	2	–2
Pakatan Harapan + Barisan Nasional	National Trust Party (Malaysia)	210,430	7.75	5	–3
Pakatan Harapan + Barisan Nasional	Total	1,621,955	59.70	34	–15
Perikatan Nasional	Malaysian United Indigenous Party	571,110	21.02	12	+6
Perikatan Nasional	Malaysian Islamic Party	368,991	13.58	10	+9
Perikatan Nasional	Parti Gerakan Rakyat Malaysia	72,546	2.67	0	0
Perikatan Nasional	Total	1,012,647	37.28	22	+15
Blok Progresif	Malaysian United Democratic Alliance	27,752	1.02	0	00
Blok Progresif	Socialist Party of Malaysia	6,257	0.23	0	00
Blok Progresif	Socialist Party of Malaysia	6,257	0.23	0	00
Blok Progresif	Malaysian United Democratic Alliance	6,257	0.23	0	00
Blok Progresif	Green Party of Malaysia	6,257	0.23	0	0
Blok Progresif	Malaysian Orang Asli Party	6,257	0.23	0	00
Blok Progresif	People's Power Party (Malaysia)	6,257	0.23	0	00
Blok Progresif	Hope Party of Malaysia	6,257	0.23	0	0
Blok Progresif	Total	34,009	1.25	00	00
Parti Rakyat Malaysia		2,824	0.10	0	00
Malaysian People's First Party		668	0.02	0	00
Independents		6,994	0.26	0	00
Total		2,716,639	100.00	56	–

=== By parliamentary constituency ===
PH+BN won 18 of 22 parliamentary constituency by average percentages.

No.	Constituency	Pakatan Harapan + Barisan Nasional	Perikatan Nasional	Member of Parliament
P092	Sabak Bernam	45.51%	54.49%	Kalam Salan
P093	Sungai Besar	50.47%	49.53%	Muslimin Yahya
P094	Hulu Selangor	50.22%	49.78%	Mohd Hasnizan Harun
P095	Tanjong Karang	41.08%	58.92%	Zulkafperi Hanapi
P096	Kuala Selangor	45.50%	54.49%	Dzulkefly Ahmad
P097	Selayang	58.25%	41.75%	William Leong Jee Keen
P098	Gombak	51.22%	48.78%	Amirudin Shari
P099	Ampang	62.48%	37.41%	Rodziah Ismail
P100	Pandan	71.64%	28.36%	Rafizi Ramli
P101	Hulu Langat	50.41%	49.59%	Mohd Sany Hamzan
P102	Bangi	68.17%	31.83%	Syahredzan Johan
P103	Puchong	71.86%	28.14%	Yeo Bee Yin
P104	Subang	83.55%	16.45%	Wong Chen
P105	Petaling Jaya	64.00%	35.99%	Lee Chean Chung
P106	Damansara	84.70%	15.30%	Gobind Singh Deo
P107	Sungai Buloh	51.55%	48.45%	Ramanan Ramakrishnan
P108	Shah Alam	55.88%	44.19%	Azli Yusof
P109	Kapar	44.92%	55.07%	Halimah Ali
P110	Klang	79.63%	20.37%	Ganabatirau Veraman
P111	Kota Raja	69.71%	30.29%	Mohamad Sabu
P112	Kuala Langat	53.00%	47.00%	Ahmad Yunus Hairi
P113	Sepang	51.41%	48.59%	Aiman Athirah Sabu

=== Seats that changed allegiance ===
No.	Seat	Previous Party (2018)	Current Party (2023)
N02	Sabak	Pakatan Harapan (AMANAH)	Perikatan Nasional (PAS)
N03	Sungai Panjang	Barisan Nasional (UMNO)	Perikatan Nasional (PAS)
N05	Hulu Bernam	Barisan Nasional (UMNO)	Perikatan Nasional (PAS)
N07	Batang Kali	Pakatan Harapan (BERSATU)	Perikatan Nasional (BERSATU)
N08	Sungai Burong	Barisan Nasional (UMNO)	Perikatan Nasional (PAS)
N09	Permatang	Pakatan Harapan (PKR)	Perikatan Nasional (BERSATU)
N10	Bukit Melawati	Pakatan Harapan (PKR)	Perikatan Nasional (BERSATU)
N11	Ijok	Pakatan Harapan (PKR)	Perikatan Nasional (PAS)
N12	Jeram	Pakatan Harapan (BERSATU)	Perikatan Nasional (BERSATU)
N13	Kuang	Pakatan Harapan (BERSATU)	Perikatan Nasional (BERSATU)
N17	Gombak Setia	Pakatan Harapan (PKR)	Perikatan Nasional (BERSATU)
N18	Hulu Kelang	Pakatan Harapan (AMANAH)	Perikatan Nasional (BERSATU)
N23	Dusun Tua	Pakatan Harapan (DAP)	Barisan Nasional (UMNO)
N24	Semenyih	Pakatan Harapan (BERSATU)	Perikatan Nasional (PAS)
N26	Sungai Ramal	Pakatan Harapan (AMANAH)	Perikatan Nasional (PAS)
N33	Taman Medan	Pakatan Harapan (PKR)	Perikatan Nasional (BERSATU)
N38	Paya Jaras	Pakatan Harapan (PKR)	Perikatan Nasional (PAS)
N41	Batu Tiga	Pakatan Harapan (PKR)	Pakatan Harapan (AMANAH)
N43	Sementa	Pakatan Harapan (PKR)	Perikatan Nasional (PAS)
N44	Selat Klang	Pakatan Harapan (BERSATU)	Perikatan Nasional (BERSATU)
N49	Sungai Kandis	Pakatan Harapan (PKR)	Perikatan Nasional (BERSATU)
N53	Morib	Pakatan Harapan (AMANAH)	Perikatan Nasional (BERSATU)
N55	Dengkil	Pakatan Harapan (BERSATU)	Perikatan Nasional (BERSATU)

== Aftermath ==
The Pakatan Harapan-Barisan Nasional unity government coalition scored 34 seats, four short of a two-third majority. Pakatan Harapan itself scored 32 seats, losing the two-thirds supermajority it held since 2018.

Amiruddin were sworn in as Menteri Besar for his second term on 21 August. The 10 EXCO members were sworn in on the same day, four from DAP, three from PKR, two from AMANAH and one from UMNO, the first time since 2008 that a BN component party member were included in the Selangor state EXCO.

=== Controversies ===
Four seats - Sungai Kandis, Gombak Setia, Taman Medan and Dengkil were picked up by Perikatan Nasional with majorities under 500 votes, with PN winning Taman Medan by a majority of only 30 votes. Allegedly, nearly 2,000 ballots were reportedly missing in Sungai Kandis, which was decided by a 167-vote majority; the Pakatan Harapan candidate Zawawi Mughni, who was the constituency's assemblyman from 2018 to 2023, has filed a police report. The Pakatan-Barisan unity government alliance considered filing election petitions for the four seats, however eventually decided to file just 1 in Gombak Setia. The petition was dismissed on 11 December by the Election Court.
