= Azmizam Zaman Huri =

Malaysian politician

Yang Berhormat Tuan Azmizam Zaman Huri MLA
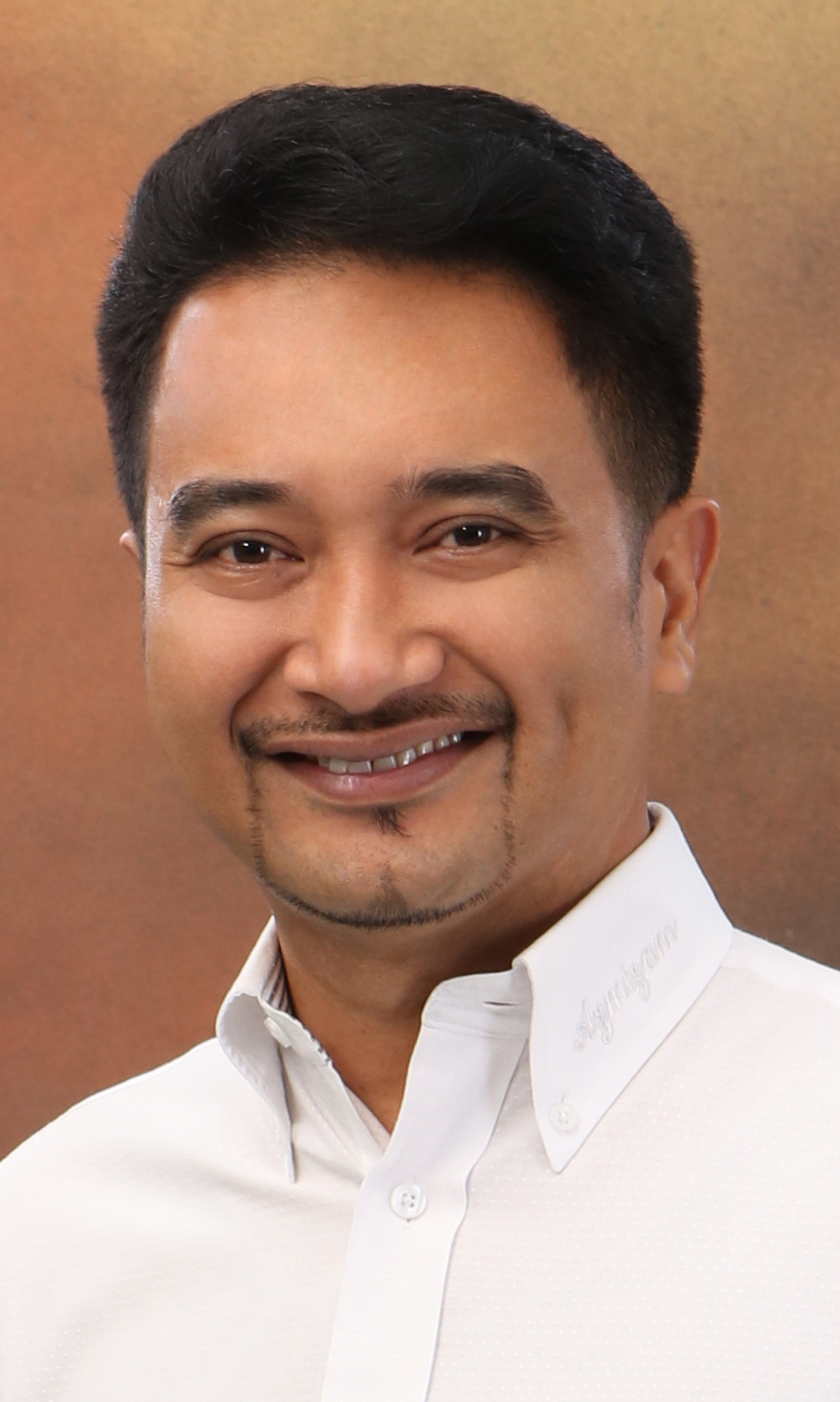

Member of the Selangor State Legislative Assembly for Pelabuhan Klang
- Incumbent
- Assumed office 9 May 2018
- Preceded by: Khalid Ibrahim (PR–PKR)
- Majority: 6,422 (2018); 5,231 (2023)

Faction represented in Selangor State Legislative Assembly
- 2018–: Pakatan Harapan

Personal details
- Born: 16 April 1973 (age 52) Pelabuhan Klang, Selangor, Malaysia
- Citizenship: Malaysian
- Party: People's Justice Party (PKR)
- Other political affiliations: Pakatan Harapan (PH)
- Occupation: Politician

Azmizam bin Zaman Huri (born 16 April 1973) is a Malaysian politician who has served as Member of the Selangor State Legislative Assembly (MLA) for Pelabuhan Klang since May 2018. He is a member of the People's Justice Party (PKR), a component party of the Pakatan Harapan (PH) coalition.

== Election results ==
Selangor State Legislative Assembly
Year	Constituency	Candidate	Votes	Pct	Opponent(s)	Votes	Pct	Ballots cast	Majority	Turnout
2018	N46 Pelabuhan Klang	Azmizam Zaman Huri (PKR)	15,837	55.95%	Seikh Rajesh Seikh Ahmad (UMNO)	9,415	33.26%	28,752	6,422	85.04%
2018	N46 Pelabuhan Klang	Azmizam Zaman Huri (PKR)	15,837	55.95%	Khalid Nayan (PAS)	2,925	10.33%	28,752	6,422	85.04%
2018	N46 Pelabuhan Klang	Azmizam Zaman Huri (PKR)	15,837	55.95%	Shanmugasundram Veerappan (PSM)	128	0.45%	28,752	6,422	85.04%
2023	N46 Pelabuhan Klang	Azmizam Zaman Huri (PKR)	21,889	56.39%	Wan Hasrina Wan Hassan (PAS)	16,658	42.91%	39,091	5,231	75.31%
2023	N46 Pelabuhan Klang	Azmizam Zaman Huri (PKR)	21,889	56.39%	Syed Ahmad Putra Syed Isa (PRM)	269	0.69%	39,091	5,231	75.31%
