= Kelompang (state constituency) =

Kalumpang
Selangor constituency

Defunct state constituency
- Legislature: Selangor State Legislative Assembly
- Constituency created: 1974
- Constituency abolished: 1995
- First contested: 1974
- Last contested: 1990

Kalumpang was a state constituency in Selangor, Malaysia, that was represented in the Selangor State Legislative Assembly from 1974 to 1995.

The state constituency was created in the 1974 redistribution and was mandated to return a single member to the Selangor State Legislative Assembly under the first past the post voting system.

== History ==
It was abolished in 1995 when it was redistributed.

=== Representation history ===
Members of the Legislative Assembly for Kelompang
Assembly	No	Years	Member	Party
Constituency created from Ulu Bernam
4th	N07	1974-1978	Shoib Ahmad	BN (UMNO)
5th	N07	1978-1982	Shoib Ahmad	BN (UMNO)
6th	N07	1982-1986	Ramli Abd Rahman	BN (UMNO)
7th	N07	1986-1990	Ramli Abd Rahman	BN (UMNO)
8th	N07	1990-1995	Ramli Abd Rahman	BN (UMNO)
Constituency abolished, renamed to Hulu Bernam

== Election results ==
Selangor state election, 1990: Kalumpang
Party	Candidate	Votes	%	∆%
BN	Ramli Abd. Rahman	8,304	73.0	▼14.54
S46	Saripudin	3,062	26.94	▲26.94
Total valid votes		11,366	100.00	
Total rejected ballots		451		
Unreturned ballots		22		
Turnout		11,839	73.23	▲3.87
Registered electors		16,167		
Majority		5,242	46.12	▼29.08
BN hold		Swing		

Selangor state election, 1986: Kalumpang
Party	Candidate	Votes	%	∆%
BN	Ramli Abd. Rahman	8,803	87.60	
PAS	Muhammad Shaari Muhammad Nor	1,246	12.40	
Total valid votes		10,049	100.00	
Total rejected ballots		455		
Unreturned ballots		0		
Turnout		10,504	69.36	▲69.36
Registered electors		15,145		
Majority		7,557	75.20	▲75.20
BN hold		Swing		

Selangor state election, 1982: Kalumpang
Party	Candidate	Votes	%	∆%
On the nomination day, Ramli Abdul Rahman won uncontested.
BN	Ramli Abdul Rahman			
Total valid votes			100.00	
Total rejected ballots				
Unreturned ballots				
Turnout				
Registered electors		13,900		
Majority				
BN hold		Swing		

Selangor state election, 1978: Kalumpang
Party	Candidate	Votes	%	∆%
BN	Shoib Ahmad	6,743	78.23	▲2.53
DAP	Ismail Mohd Yusop	1,876	21.77	▲21.77
Total valid votes		8,619	100.00	
Total rejected ballots		596		
Unreturned ballots		0		
Turnout		9,215	76.96	▼2.53
Registered electors		11,974		
Majority		4,867	56.47	▲5.06
BN hold		Swing		

Selangor state election, 1974: Kalumpang
Party	Candidate	Votes	%
BN	Shoib Ahmad	4,983	75.71
Parti Rakyat Malaysia	Serajadin Ariffin	1,599	24.29
Total valid votes		6,582	100.00
Total rejected ballots		656	
Unreturned ballots		0	
Turnout		7,238	79.49
Registered electors		9,106	
Majority		3,384	51.41
This was a new constituency created.
