= Kampung Tunku (state constituency) =

Constituency in Malaysia

Kampung Tunku (N35)
Selangor constituency

State constituency
- Legislature: Selangor State Legislative Assembly
MLA
Lim Yi Wei
PH
- Constituency created: 1994
- First contested: 1995
- Last contested: 2023

Demographics
- Electors (2023): 58,357

Kampung Tunku is a state constituency in Selangor, Malaysia, that has been represented in the Selangor State Legislative Assembly since 1995.

The state constituency was created in the 1994 redistribution and is mandated to return a single member to the Selangor State Legislative Assembly under the first past the post voting system. Since 2018, the State Assemblyman for Kampung Tunku is Lim Yi Wei from the Democratic Action Party (DAP), which is part of the state's ruling coalition, Pakatan Harapan (PH).

== Demographics ==
Ethnic breakdown of Kampung Tunku's electorate as of 2023
1. Chinese (72.5%)
2. Malay (15.0%)
3. Indian (10.1%)
4. Other ethnicities (2.47%)

== History ==
=== Polling districts ===
According to the federal gazette issued on 30 March 2018, the Kampung Tunku constituency is divided into 35 polling districts.

State constituency	Polling Districts	Code	Location
Kampung Tunku (N35）	Seksyen 21 Timur	106/35/01	SMK (P) Sri Aman
Kampung Tunku (N35）	Seksyen 20 Utara	106/35/02	SMK (P) Sri Aman
Kampung Tunku (N35）	Seksyen 20 Selatan	106/35/03	SMK (P) Sri Aman
Kampung Tunku (N35）	Seksyen 22	106/35/04	SMK (P) Sri Aman
Kampung Tunku (N35）	Kampung Tunku Utara	106/35/05	SK Kampung Tunku
Kampung Tunku (N35）	Kampung Tunku Selatan	106/35/06	SK Kampung Tunku
Kampung Tunku (N35）	SS 3 Utara	106/35/07	SMK Sri Permata
Kampung Tunku (N35）	SS 3 Barat	106/35/08	SMK Sri Permata
Kampung Tunku (N35）	SS 3 Timur	106/35/09	Dewan Seberguna SS 3/14 Petaling Jaya
Kampung Tunku (N35）	Sungai Way Utara	106/35/10	SJK (C) Sungai Way
Kampung Tunku (N35）	Sungai Way Tengah Dua	106/35/11	SJK (C) Sungai Way
Kampung Tunku (N35）	Sungai Way Tengah Satu	106/35/12	SJK (C) Sungai Way
Kampung Tunku (N35）	Sungai Way Selatan Dua	106/36/13	SJK (C) Sungai Way
Kampung Tunku (N35）	Sungai Way Selatan Satu	106/35/14	SJK (C) Sungai Way
Kampung Tunku (N35）	SS 2 Utara	106/35/15	SK Taman Sea
Kampung Tunku (N35）	SS 2 Tengah	106/35/16	SJK (C) Puay Chai
Kampung Tunku (N35）	SS 2 Selatan	106/35/17	SMK Taman S.E.A
Kampung Tunku (N35）	Seksyen 21 Barat	106/35/18	SMK Taman S.E.A

=== Representation history ===
Members of the Legislative Assembly for Kampung Tunku
Assembly	No	Years	Member	Party
Constituency created from Taman Aman
9th	N26	1995-1999	Khoo Ooi Seng (邱惠成)	BN (MCA)
10th	N26	1999-2004	Wong Sai Hou (黄世豪)	BN (MCA)
11th	N35	2004-2008	Wong Sai Hou (黄世豪)	BN (MCA)
12th	N35	2008-2013	Lau Weng San (劉永山)	PR (DAP)
13th	N35	2013-2015	Lau Weng San (劉永山)	PR (DAP)
13th	N35	2015-2018	Lau Weng San (劉永山)	PH (DAP)
14th	N35	2018–2023	Lim Yi Wei (林怡威)	PH (DAP)
15th	N35	2023–present	Lim Yi Wei (林怡威)	PH (DAP)

== Election results ==
Selangor state election, 2023
Party	Candidate	Votes	%	∆%
PH	Lim Yi Wei	33,745	90.93	▲1.40
PN	Chin Yoke Kheng	3,367	9.07	▲9.07
Total valid votes		37,112	100.00	
Total rejected ballots		149		
Unreturned ballots		63		
Turnout		37,324	63.96	▼15.92
Registered electors		58,357		
Majority		30,378	81.86	▲2.80
PH hold		Swing		

Selangor state election, 2018
Party	Candidate	Votes	%	∆%
PKR	Lim Yi Wei	34,477	89.53	▲89.53
BN	Tan Gim Tuan	4,033	10.47	▼13.05
Total valid votes		38,510	100.00	
Total rejected ballots		204		
Unreturned ballots		107		
Turnout		38,821	79.88	▼1.58
Registered electors		48,601		
Majority		30,444	79.06	▲26.10
PKR hold		Swing		

Selangor state election, 2013
Party	Candidate	Votes	%	∆%
DAP	Lau Weng San	19,762	76.48	▲7.74
BN	Kelvin Chong Seng Foo	6,077	23.52	▼7.74
Total valid votes		25,839	100.00	
Total rejected ballots		203		
Unreturned ballots		31		
Turnout		26,073	81.46	▲10.11
Registered electors		32,007		
Majority		13,685	52.96	▲15.48
DAP hold		Swing		
Source(s) "Federal Government Gazette - Notice of Contested Election, State Legislative Assembly for the State of Selangor [P.U. (B) 192/2013]" (PDF). Attorney General's Chambers of Malaysia. 26 April 2013. Archived from the original (PDF) on 2019-12-29. "Federal Government Gazette - Results of Contested Election and Statements of the Poll after the Official Addition of Votes, State Constituencies for the State of Selangor [P.U. (B) 233/2013]". Attorney General's Chambers of Malaysia. 22 May 2013. Archived from the original (PDF) on 2018-10-02.

Selangor state election, 2008
Party	Candidate	Votes	%	∆%
DAP	Lau Weng San	14,633	68.74	▲27.62
BN	Sheah Kok Fah	6,656	31.26	▼27.62
Total valid votes		21,289	100.00	
Total rejected ballots		234		
Unreturned ballots		14		
Turnout		21,537	71.35	▲4.58
Registered electors		30,183		
Majority		7,977	37.48	▲19.72
DAP gain from BN		Swing		?

Selangor state election, 2004
Party	Candidate	Votes	%	∆%
BN	Wong Sai Hou	11,979	58.88	▲2.23
DAP	Ean Yong Hian Wah	8,367	41.12	▼2.23
Total valid votes		20,346	100.00	
Total rejected ballots		270		
Unreturned ballots		0		
Turnout		20,616	66.77	▼1.12
Registered electors		30,877		
Majority		3,612	17.76	▲4.46
BN hold		Swing		

Selangor state election, 1999
Party	Candidate	Votes	%	∆%
BN	Wong Sai Hou	11,658	56.65	▼1.07
DAP	T. Kannan	8,922	43.35	▲1.07
Total valid votes		20,580	100.00	
Total rejected ballots		223		
Unreturned ballots		17		
Turnout		20,820	67.90	▲4.26
Registered electors		30,663		
Majority		2,736	13.30	▼2.14
BN hold		Swing		

Selangor state election, 1995
Party	Candidate	Votes	%
BN	Khoo Ooi Seng	11,092	57.72
DAP	Pakiyanathan Anamaly	8,125	42.28
Total valid votes		19,217	100.00
Total rejected ballots		346	
Unreturned ballots		73	
Turnout		19,636	63.64
Registered electors		30,857	
Majority		2,967	15.44
This was a new constituency created.
