= Selangor State Legislative Assembly =

Legislative branch, Selangor government

Selangor State Legislative Assembly Dewan Negeri Selangor ديوان نݢري سلاڠور
- 15th Selangor State Assembly
- Insignia of Selangor State Legislative Assembly

Type
- Type: Unicameral

History
- Founded: 8 July 1959 (Dewan Negeri Selangor); 11 June 1877 (Majlis Mesyuarat Negeri)
- Preceded by: Majlis Mesyuarat Negeri

Leadership
- Sultan: Sultan Sharafuddin Idris Shah Al-Marhum Sultan Salahuddin Abdul Aziz Shah Al-Haj since 22 November 2001
- Speaker: Lau Weng San, PH–DAP since 19 September 2023
- Deputy Speaker: Mohd Kamri Kamaruddin, PH–PKR since 19 September 2023
- Menteri Besar: Amirudin Shari, PH–PKR since 19 June 2018
- Opposition Leader: Azmin Ali, BERSATU since 19 September 2023
- Secretary: Gayathri Prasena Jaya Kumar

Structure
- Seats: 56; Quorum: 19; Simple majority: 29; Two-thirds majority : 38
- Political groups: (As of 23 October 2026) Government (35); PH (32): DAP (15); PKR (12); AMANAH (5); BN (2): UMNO (2); Independent (1) Opposition (21); PN (21): BERSATU (11); PAS (10); Speaker (1) PH (non-MLA)
- Committees: 10: Public Accounts Committee; Standing Orders Committee; Committee of Privileges; Special Select Committee on Capability, Accountability and Transparency; Select Committee for District Offices; Select Committee for Local Authorities; Select Committee for Agencies, Statutory Bodies and Subsidiaries; Special Select House Management Committee; Special Select Committee for Poverty Eradication; Special Select Committee for Water Supply Management

Elections
- Voting system: Plurality: First-past-the-post (56 single-member constituencies)
- Last election: 12 August 2023
- Next election: By 18 November 2028

Meeting place
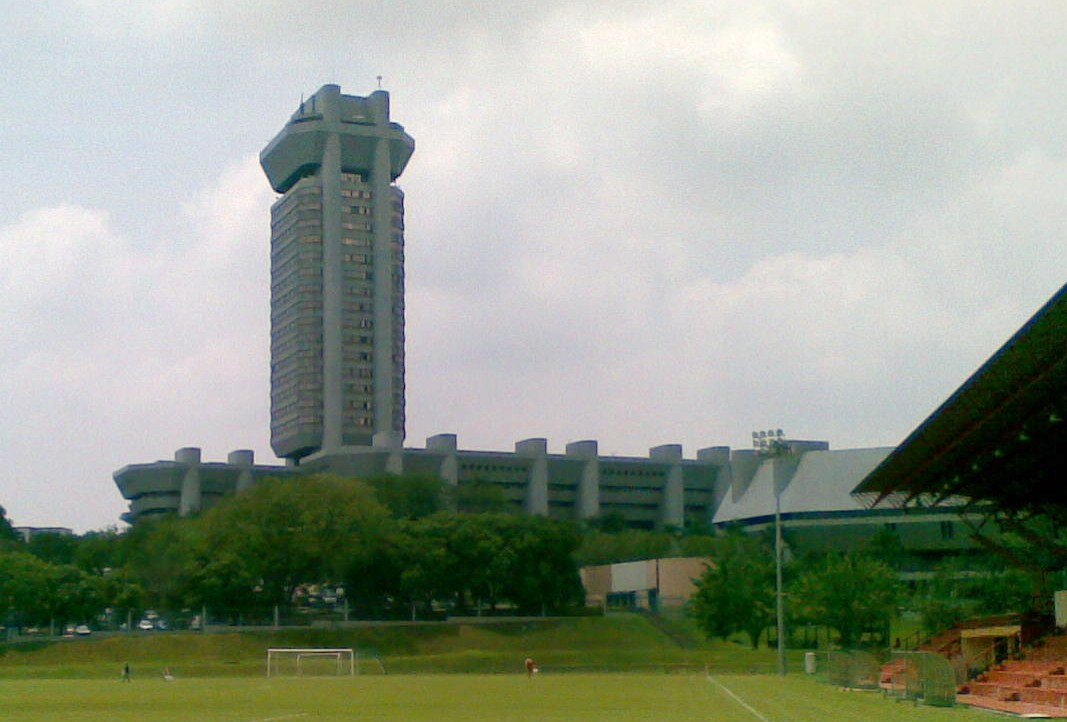
- Bangunan Sultan Salahuddin Abdul Aziz Shah, Shah Alam, Selangor

Website
- dewan.selangor.gov.my

The Selangor State Legislative Assembly (Malay: Dewan Negeri Selangor) is the unicameral state legislature of the Malaysian state of Selangor. The State Assembly is composed of 56 members representing single-member constituencies throughout the state. Elections are held no more than five years apart, and by Malaysian political convention, are conducted simultaneously with elections to the federal parliament and other state assemblies.

It convenes at the Sultan Salahuddin Abdul Aziz Shah Building in the capital Shah Alam. Since 2008, Assembly proceedings have been broadcast live on the internet.

Map of current constituencies (since 2018). Federal Territories of Kuala Lumpur and Putrajaya also included

== Current composition ==
Government (35)					Opposition (21)
PH			BN	IND	PN
32			2	1	21
15	12	5	2	1	11	10
DAP	PKR	AMANAH	UMNO	IND	BERSATU	PAS

No.	Parliamentary Constituency	No.	State Constituency	Member	Coalition (Party)	Post
N/A			Non-MLA	Lau Weng San	PH (DAP)	Speaker
P092	Sabak Bernam	N01	Sungai Air Tawar	Rizam Ismail	BN (UMNO)	EXCO Member
P092	Sabak Bernam	N02	Sabak	Sallehen Mukhyi	PN (PAS)	N/A
P093	Sungai Besar	N03	Sungai Panjang	Mohd Razali Saari	PN (PAS)	N/A
P093	Sungai Besar	N04	Sekinchan	Ng Suee Lim	PH (DAP)	EXCO Member
P094	Hulu Selangor	N05	Hulu Bernam	Mui'zzuddeen Mahyuddin	PN (PAS)	N/A
P094	Hulu Selangor	N06	Kuala Kubu Baharu	Pang Sock Tao	PH (DAP)	N/A
P094	Hulu Selangor	N07	Batang Kali	Muhammad Muhaimin Harith Abdullah Sani	PN (BERSATU)	N/A
P095	Tanjong Karang	N08	Sungai Burong	Mohd Zamri Mohd Zainuldin	PN (PAS)	N/A
P095	Tanjong Karang	N09	Permatang	Nurul Syazwani Noh	PN (BERSATU)	N/A
P096	Kuala Selangor	N10	Bukit Melawati	Noorazley Yahya	PN (BERSATU)	N/A
P096	Kuala Selangor	N11	Ijok	Jefri Mejan	PN (PAS)	N/A
P096	Kuala Selangor	N12	Jeram	Harrison Hassan	PN (BERSATU)	N/A
P097	Selayang	N13	Kuang	Mohd Rafiq Mohd Abdullah	PN (BERSATU)	N/A
P097	Selayang	N14	Rawang	Chua Wei Kiat	PH (PKR)	N/A
P097	Selayang	N15	Taman Templer	Anfaal Saari	PH (AMANAH)	EXCO Member
P098	Gombak	N16	Sungai Tua	Amirudin Shari	PH (PKR)	Menteri Besar; MP for Gombak
P098	Gombak	N17	Gombak Setia	Muhammad Hilman Idham	PN (BERSATU)	N/A
P098	Gombak	N18	Hulu Kelang	Azmin Ali	PN (BERSATU)	Leader of the Opposition; Former Menteri Besar of Selangor
P099	Ampang	N19	Bukit Antarabangsa	Mohd Kamri Kamaruddin	PH (PKR)	Deputy Speaker
P099	Ampang	N20	Lembah Jaya	Syed Ahmad Syed Abdul Rahman Alhadad	PH (PKR)	N/A
P100	Pandan	N21	Pandan Indah	Izham Hashim	PH (AMANAH)	EXCO Member
P100	Pandan	N22	Teratai	Yew Jia Haur	PH (DAP)	N/A
P101	Hulu Langat	N23	Dusun Tua	Johan Abd Aziz	BN (UMNO)	N/A
P101	Hulu Langat	N24	Semenyih	Nushi Mahfodz	PN (PAS)	N/A
P102	Bangi	N25	Kajang	David Cheong Kian Young	PH (PKR)	N/A
P102	Bangi	N26	Sungai Ramal	Mohd Shafie Ngah	PN (PAS)	N/A
P102	Bangi	N27	Balakong	Wayne Ong Chun Wei	PH (DAP)	N/A
P103	Puchong	N28	Seri Kembangan	Wong Siew Ki	PH (DAP)	N/A
P103	Puchong	N29	Seri Serdang	Abbas Salimi Azmi	PH (AMANAH)	N/A
P104	Subang	N30	Kinrara	Ng Sze Han	PH (DAP)	EXCO Member
P104	Subang	N31	Subang Jaya	Michelle Ng Mei Sze	PH (DAP)	Political Secretary to the Minister of Digital
P105	Petaling Jaya	N32	Seri Setia	Mohammad Fahmi Ngah	PH (PKR)	EXCO Member
P105	Petaling Jaya	N33	Taman Medan	Afif Bahardin	PN (BERSATU)	N/A
P105	Petaling Jaya	N34	Bukit Gasing	Rajiv Rishyakaran	PH (DAP)	N/A
P106	Damansara	N35	Kampung Tunku	Lim Yi Wei	PH (DAP)	N/A
P106	Damansara	N36	Bandar Utama	Jamaliah Jamaluddin	PH (DAP)	EXCO Member
P106	Damansara	N37	Bukit Lanjan	Pua Pei Ling	PH (PKR)	N/A
P107	Sungai Buloh	N38	Paya Jaras	Ab Halim Tamuri	PN (PAS)	N/A
P107	Sungai Buloh	N39	Kota Damansara	Muhammad Izuan Ahmad Kasim	PH (PKR)	N/A
P108	Shah Alam	N40	Kota Anggerik	Najwan Halimi	PH (PKR)	EXCO Member
P108	Shah Alam	N41	Batu Tiga	Danial Al Rashid Haron Aminar Rashid	PH (AMANAH)	N/A
P109	Kapar	N42	Meru	Mariam Abdul Rashid	PH (AMANAH)	N/A
P109	Kapar	N43	Sementa	Noor Najhan Mohamad Salleh	PN (PAS)	N/A
P109	Kapar	N44	Selat Klang	Abdul Rashid Asari (Note: On 6 March 2024, Abdul Rashid declared support for Menteri Besar Amirudin Shari and his state government.)	IND	N/A
P110	Klang	N45	Bandar Baru Klang	Quah Perng Fei	PH (DAP)	N/A
P110	Klang	N46	Pelabuhan Klang	Azmizam Zaman Huri	PH (PKR)	N/A
P110	Klang	N47	Pandamaran	Tony Leong Tuck Chee	PH (DAP)	N/A
P111	Kota Raja	N48	Sentosa	Gunarajah George	PH (PKR)	N/A
P111	Kota Raja	N49	Sungai Kandis	Wan Dzahanurin Ahmad	PN (BERSATU)	N/A
P111	Kota Raja	N50	Kota Kemuning	Preakas Sampunathan	PH (DAP)	N/A
P112	Kuala Langat	N51	Sijangkang	Ahmad Yunus Hairi	PN (PAS)	MP for Kuala Langat
P112	Kuala Langat	N52	Banting	Papparaidu Veraman	PH (DAP)	EXCO Member
P112	Kuala Langat	N53	Morib	Rosnizan Ahmad	PN (BERSATU)	N/A
P113	Sepang	N54	Tanjong Sepat	Borhan Aman Shah	PH (PKR)	EXCO Member
P113	Sepang	N55	Dengkil	Jamil Salleh	PN (BERSATU)	N/A
P113	Sepang	N56	Sungai Pelek	Lwi Kian Keong	PH (DAP)	N/A

== Seating arrangement ==
N44 Selat Klang	N56 Sungai Pelek	N41 Batu Tiga	N22 Teratai	N20 Lembah Jaya	N29 Seri Serdang	N37 Bukit Lanjan	Vacant
Vacant	N42 Meru	N25 Kajang	N27 Balakong	N14 Rawang	N28 Seri Kembangan	Vacant
Vacant	N35 Kampung Tunku	N48 Sentosa	N47 Pandamaran	N31 Subang Jaya	Vacant
Vacant	N11 Ijok	N23 Dusun Tua	N34 Bukit Gasing	N46 Pelabuhan Klang	N06 Kuala Kubu Baharu	Vacant
N49 Sungai Kandis	N08 Sungai Burong	B	N40 Kota Anggerik (EXCO Member)	N39 Kota Damansara
N03 Sungai Panjang	N13 Kuang	N51 Sijangkang	C	A	N54 Tanjong Sepat (EXCO Member)	N01 Sungai Air Tawar (EXCO Member)	N45 Bandar Baru Klang
Vacant	N09 Permatang	N02 Sabak	N17 Gombak Setia	N21 Pandan Indah (EXCO Member)	N04 Sekinchan (EXCO Member)	N50 Kota Kemuning
N07 Batang Kali	N43 Sementa	N33 Taman Medan	N38 Paya Jaras	Sergeant-at-Arm	N30 Kinrara (EXCO Member)	State Financial Officer	N15 Taman Templer (EXCO Member)	Vacant
N10 Bukit Melawati	N53 Morib	N26 Sungai Ramal	N18 Hulu Kelang (Opposition Leader)	N16 Sungai Tua (Menteri Besar)	State Legal Advisor	N32 Seri Setia (EXCO Member)	N19 Bukit Antarabangsa (Deputy Speaker)
N05 Hulu Bernam	N24 Semenyih	N12 Jeram	State Secretary	N52 Banting (EXCO Member)	Vacant
N55 Dengkil	the Mace	N36 Bandar Utama (EXCO Member)
Secretary
Speaker
Sultan

== Role ==
As the state's legislative body, the Selangor State Legislative Assembly's main function is to enact laws that apply to Selangor, known as enactments. The Speaker presides over the Assembly's proceedings, and works to maintain order during debates. The present Speaker is Lau Weng San of the Democratic Action Party (DAP) and the Pakatan Harapan (PH) coalition.

The state government's executive branch (known as the Selangor State Executive Council (EXCO), or Majlis Mesyuarat Kerajaan Negeri), including the Menteri Besar, are drawn from the Assembly. The Menteri Besar is ceremonially appointed by the Sultan of Selangor on the basis that he is able to command a majority in the Assembly. The Menteri Besar then appoints members of the State EXCO drawing from members of the Assembly.

=== Selcat ===
The Speaker also chairs the Select Committee on Competency, Accountability and Transparency (Selcat), a six-member panel consisting of state assemblymen which holds public hearings to investigate state issues. Selcat was formed when Pakatan Rakyat came to power after the 2008 election.

== Speakers Roll of Honour ==
The following is the Speaker of the Selangor State Legislative Assembly Roll of Honour, since 1959:

No.	Speaker	Term start	Term end	Party	Constituency
1	Abdullah Hassan	8 July 1959	17 November 1962	Alliance (UMNO)	Port Swettenham
2	Abdullah Yassin	4 December 1962	12 November 1966	Alliance (UMNO)	Kampong Bharu
3	Raja Nong Chik Raja Ishak	9 December 1966	19 Mac 1969	Alliance (UMNO)	Dengkil
4	Raja Zulklifi Raja Borhan	15 March 1971	30 July 1974	Alliance (UMNO)	Port Swettenham
5	Shoib Ahmad	16 September 1974	29 March 1982	BN (UMNO)	Kalumpang
6	Saidin Tamby	4 June 1982	5 October 1990	BN (UMNO)	Gombak
6	Saidin Tamby	4 June 1982	5 October 1990	BN (UMNO)	Paya Jaras
7	Zainal Dahalan	19 November 1990	25 April 1995	BN (UMNO)	Sungai Air Tawar
8	Onn Ismail	18 Mei 1995	22 April 2008	BN (UMNO)	Selat Klang
9	Teng Chang Khim	22 April 2008	30 Mei 2013	PR (DAP)	Sungai Pinang
10	Hannah Yeoh Tseow Suan	21 June 2013	9 April 2018	PH (DAP)	Subang Jaya
11	Ng Suee Lim	26 June 2018	23 June 2023	PH (DAP)	Sekinchan
12	Lau Weng San	19 September 2023	Incumbent	PH (DAP)	non-MLA

== Election pendulum ==
The 2023 Selangor state election witnessed 34 governmental seats and 22 non-governmental seats fill the Selangor State Legislative Assembly. The government side has 16 safe seats and 8 fairly safe seats, while the non-government side has 6 fairly safe seats.

2023 Selangor state election

GOVERNMENT SEATS
Marginal
Taman Templer	Anfaal Saari	AMANAH	49.67
Dusun Tua	Johan Abd Aziz	UMNO	49.91
Sungai Pelek	Lwi Kian Keong	DAP	51.77
Batu Tiga	Danial Al Rashid Haron Aminar Rashid	AMANAH	51.30
Meru	Mariam Abdul Rashid	AMANAH	52.45
Sungai Air Tawar	Rizam Ismail	UMNO	52.84
Kota Damansara	Muhamad Izuan Ahmad Kasim	PKR	53.72
Kuala Kubu Baharu	Lee Kee Hiong	DAP	54.40
Tanjong Sepat	Borhan Aman Shah	PKR	55.01
Kota Anggerik	Najwan Halimi	PKR	55.97
Fairly safe
Pelabuhan Klang	Azmizam Zaman Huri	PKR	56.39
Sungai Tua	Amirudin Shari	PKR	56.87
Lembah Jaya	Syed Ahmad Syed Abdul Rahman Alhadad	PKR	57.27
Seri Setia	Fahmi Ngah	PKR	58.37
Seri Serdang	Abbas Salimi Azmi	AMANAH	59.71
Pandan Indah	Ir. Izham Hashim	AMANAH	59.95
Safe
Sekinchan	Ng Suee Lim	DAP	62.22
Bukit Antarabangsa	Mohd Kamri Kamaruddin	PKR	65.86
Kota Kemuning	Preakas Sampunathan	DAP	70.08
Kajang	David Cheong Kian Young	PKR	70.36
Rawang	Chua Wei Kiat	PKR	74.35
Balakong	Wayne Ong Chun Wei	DAP	76.21
Bukit Lanjan	Pua Pei Ling	DAP	78.29
Teratai	Yew Jia Haur	DAP	80.07
Banting	Papparaidu Veraman	DAP	80.58
Kinrara	Ng Sze Han	DAP	80.97
Subang Jaya	Michelle Ng Mei Sze	DAP	81.26
Sentosa	Gunarajah George	PKR	83.53
Bandar Utama	Jamaliah Jamaluddin	DAP	85.25
Bukit Gasing	Rajiv Rishyakaran	DAP	85.87
Pandamaran	Leong Tuck Chee	DAP	86.75
Bandar Baru Klang	Quah Perng Fei	DAP	87.04
Seri Kembangan	Wong Siew Ki	DAP	89.30
Kampung Tunku	Lim Yi Wei	DAP	90.90

NON-GOVERNMENT SEATS
Marginal
Dengkil	Jamil Salleh	BERSATU	48.52
Sungai Kandis	Wan Dzahanurin Ahmad	BERSATU	49.01
Gombak Setia	Hilman Idham	BERSATU	49.17
Taman Medan	Afif Bahardin	BERSATU	50.03
Semenyih	Nushi Mahfodz	PAS	50.87
Ijok	Jefri Mejan	PAS	51.52
Bukit Melawati	Noorazley Yahya	BERSATU	51.54
Hulu Bernam	Mu'izuddin Mahyuddin	PAS	51.61
Hulu Kelang	Azmin Ali	BERSATU	51.63
Paya Jaras	Ab Halim Tamuri	PAS	51.63
Batang Kali	Muhammad Muhaimin Harith Abdullah Sani	BERSATU	52.42
Permatang	Nurul Syazwani Noh	BERSATU	53.60
Sungai Ramal	Mohd Shafie Ngah	PAS	51.34
Kuang	Mohd Rafiq Abdullah	BERSATU	55.37
Morib	Rosnizan Ahmad	BERSATU	55.65
Sungai Panjang	Mohd Razali Saari	PAS	55.89
Fairly safe
Selat Klang	Abdul Rashid Asari	BERSATU	58.88
Sementa	Noor Najhan Mohamad Salleh	PAS	59.20
Sabak	Sallehen Mukhyi	PAS	59.31
Jeram	Harrison Hassan	BERSATU	59.62
Sijangkang	Dr. Ahmad Yunus Hairi	PAS	61.41
Sungai Burong	Mohd Zamri Mohd Zainuldin	PAS	64.22

== List of assemblies ==
Assembly	Term began	Members	Committee	Governing parties
State Council	1955	28	Abdul Aziz (1955–1956); Muhammad Ismail (1956–1958); Abdul Jamil (1958–1959)	Alliance (UMNO–MCA–MIC)
1st	1959	28	Abu Bakar	Alliance (UMNO–MCA–MIC)
2nd	1964	28	Harun I	Alliance (UMNO–MCA–MIC)
3rd	1969	28	Harun II	Alliance (UMNO–MCA–MIC) (1969–1972); Alliance (UMNO–MCA–MIC)–GERAKAN (1972–1973)
3rd	1969	28	Harun II	BN (UMNO–MCA–MIC–GERAKAN) (1973–1974)
4th	1974	33	Harun III (1974–1976); Hormat I (1976–1978)	BN (UMNO–MCA–MIC–GERAKAN–PAS) (1974–1977); BN (UMNO–MCA–MIC–GERAKAN) (1977–1978)
5th	1978	33	Hormat II	BN (UMNO–MCA–MIC–GERAKAN)
6th	1982	33	Ahmad Razali	BN (UMNO–MCA–MIC–GERAKAN)
7th	1986	42	Muhammad Taib I	BN (UMNO–MCA–MIC)
8th	1990	42	Muhammad Taib II	BN (UMNO–MCA–MIC)
9th	1995	48	Muhammad Taib III (1995–1997); Abu Hassan I (1997–1999)	BN (UMNO–MCA–MIC–GERAKAN)
10th	1999	48	Abu Hassan II (1999–2000); Mohamed Khir I (2000–2004)	BN (UMNO–MCA–MIC–GERAKAN)
11th	2004	56	Mohamed Khir II	BN (UMNO–MCA–MIC–GERAKAN)
12th	2008	56	Khalid I	PR (PKR–DAP–PAS)
13th	2013	56	Khalid II (2013–2014)	PR (PKR–DAP–PAS) (2013–2014)
13th	2013	56	Khalid II (2013–2014)	PAS (2014)
13th	2013	56	Azmin I (2014–2018)	PR (PKR–DAP–PAS) (2014–2015)
13th	2013	56	Azmin I (2014–2018)	PH (PKR–DAP–AMANAH)–PAS (2015–2018)
14th	2018	56	Azmin II (2018)	PH (PKR–DAP–AMANAH–BERSATU)
14th	2018	56	Amirudin I (2018–2023)	PH (PKR–DAP–AMANAH–BERSATU) (2018–2020); PH (PKR–DAP–AMANAH) (2020–2022)
14th	2018	56	Amirudin I (2018–2023)	PH (PKR–DAP–AMANAH)–BN (UMNO) (2022–2023)
15th	2023	56	Amirudin II	PH (PKR–DAP–AMANAH)–BN (UMNO)
