= 2004 Malaysian state elections =

State assembly elections were held in Malaysia on 21 March 2004 in all states except Sarawak. The elections took place alongside general elections, and saw Barisan Nasional and its allies won majorities in all states except Kelantan where, despite earlier reports to the contrary, Pan-Malaysian Islamic Party (PAS) retained control with a narrow majority of 24 seats to BN's 21. The National Front regained control of the state of Terengganu, which it lost to the PAS in 1999.

== Results ==
=== Perlis ===
Party or alliance		Votes	%	Seats	+/–
Barisan Nasional	United Malays National Organisation	48,292	53.03	12	+2
Barisan Nasional	Malaysian Chinese Association	8,911	9.79	2	0
Barisan Nasional	Total	57,203	62.82	14	+2
Barisan Alternatif	Pan-Malaysian Islamic Party	29,033	31.88	1	–2
Barisan Alternatif	Parti Keadilan Nasional	4,826	5.30	0	New
Barisan Alternatif	Total	33,859	37.18	1	–2
Total		91,062	100.00	15	0
Valid votes		91,062	97.61		
Invalid/blank votes		2,227	2.39		
Total votes		93,289	100.00		
Registered voters/turnout		112,482	82.94		

=== Kedah ===
Party or alliance		Votes	%	Seats	+/–
Barisan Nasional	United Malays National Organisation	294,322	45.03	23	+7
Barisan Nasional	Malaysian Chinese Association	47,543	7.27	4	0
Barisan Nasional	Malaysian Indian Congress	27,414	4.19	2	0
Barisan Nasional	Parti Gerakan Rakyat Malaysia	21,114	3.23	2	0
Barisan Nasional	Total	390,393	59.73	31	+7
Barisan Alternatif	Pan-Malaysian Islamic Party	212,572	32.52	5	–7
Barisan Alternatif	People's Justice Party	47,815	7.32	0	New
Barisan Alternatif	Total	260,387	39.84	5	-7
Democratic Action Party		2,818	0.43	0	0
Total		653,598	100.00	36	0
Valid votes		653,598	98.29		
Invalid/blank votes		11,384	1.71		
Total votes		664,982	100.00		
Registered voters/turnout		821,901	80.91		
Source: Laporan Pilihan Raya Umum 2004, Suruhanjaya Pilihan Raya Malaysia

=== Kelantan ===
Party or alliance		Seats	+/–
Pan-Malaysian Islamic Party		24	–17
Barisan Nasional	United Malays National Organisation	21	+19
Barisan Nasional	Malaysian Chinese Association	0	0
Barisan Nasional	Total	21	+19
People's Justice Party		0	0
Independents		0	0
Total		45	+2

=== Terengganu ===
Party or alliance		Votes	%	Seats	+/–
Barisan Nasional	United Malays National Organisation	214,247	54.47	27	+23
Barisan Nasional	Malaysian Chinese Association	8,236	2.09	1	+1
Barisan Nasional	Total	222,483	56.56	28	+24
Pan-Malaysian Islamic Party		170,859	43.44	4	–24
Total		393,342	100.00	32	0
Valid votes		393,342	98.78		
Invalid/blank votes		4,874	1.22		
Total votes		398,216	100.00		
Registered voters/turnout		455,924	87.34		
Source: Laporan Pilihan Raya Umum 2004, Suruhanjaya Pilihan Raya Malaysia

=== Penang ===
Party or alliance		Votes	%	Seats	+/–
Barisan Nasional	United Malays National Organisation	112,169	22.45	14	+4
Barisan Nasional	Parti Gerakan Rakyat Malaysia	108,612	21.74	13	+3
Barisan Nasional	Malaysian Chinese Association	82,993	16.61	9	0
Barisan Nasional	Malaysian Indian Congress	11,747	2.35	2	+1
Barisan Nasional	Total	315,521	63.15	38	+8
Democratic Action Party		100,906	20.19	1	0
Pan-Malaysian Islamic Party		28,862	5.78	1	0
National Justice Party		53,660	10.74	0	–1
Independents		710	0.14	0	0
Total		499,659	100.00	40	+7
Valid votes		499,659	98.06		
Invalid/blank votes		9,864	1.94		
Total votes		509,523	100.00		
Registered voters/turnout		672,362	75.78		
Source: Laporan Pilihan Raya Umum 2004, Suruhanjaya Pilihan Raya Malaysia

=== Perak ===
Party or alliance		Seats	+/–
Barisan Nasional	United Malays National Organisation	34	+8
Barisan Nasional	Malaysian Chinese Association	10	–2
Barisan Nasional	Parti Gerakan Rakyat Malaysia	4	+1
Barisan Nasional	Malaysian Indian Congress	4	+1
Barisan Nasional	People's Progressive Party	0	0
Barisan Nasional	Total	52	+8
Democratic Action Party		7	+3
Pan-Malaysian Islamic Party		0	–3
People's Justice Party		0	–1
Independents		0	0
Total		59	+7

=== Pahang ===
Party or alliance		Seats	+/–
Barisan Nasional	United Malays National Organisation	31	+10
Barisan Nasional	Malaysian Chinese Association	8	+1
Barisan Nasional	Parti Gerakan Rakyat Malaysia	1	0
Barisan Nasional	Malaysian Indian Congress	1	0
Barisan Nasional	Total	41	+11
Democratic Action Party		1	0
Pan-Malaysian Islamic Party		0	–6
People's Justice Party		0	–1
Total		42	+4

=== Selangor ===
Party or alliance		Seats	+/–
Barisan Nasional	United Malays National Organisation	35	+9
Barisan Nasional	Malaysian Chinese Association	12	+1
Barisan Nasional	Parti Gerakan Rakyat Malaysia	4	+2
Barisan Nasional	Malaysian Indian Congress	3	0
Barisan Nasional	Total	54	+12
Democratic Action Party		2	+1
Pan-Malaysian Islamic Party		0	–4
People's Justice Party		0	–1
Independents		0	0
Total		56	+8

=== Negeri Sembilan ===
Party or alliance		Seats	+/–
Barisan Nasional	United Malays National Organisation	22	+2
Barisan Nasional	Malaysian Chinese Association	8	–1
Barisan Nasional	Malaysian Indian Congress	2	0
Barisan Nasional	Parti Gerakan Rakyat Malaysia	2	+1
Barisan Nasional	Total	34	+2
Democratic Action Party		2	+2
Pan-Malaysian Islamic Party		0	0
Total		36	+4

=== Malacca ===
Party or alliance		Seats	+/–
Barisan Nasional	United Malays National Organisation	18	+2
Barisan Nasional	Malaysian Chinese Association	6	+2
Barisan Nasional	Malaysian Indian Congress	1	0
Barisan Nasional	Parti Gerakan Rakyat Malaysia	1	+1
Barisan Nasional	Total	26	+5
Democratic Action Party		2	–2
Pan-Malaysian Islamic Party		0	0
Total		28	+3

=== Johor ===
Party or alliance		Seats	+/–
Barisan Nasional	United Malays National Organisation	33	+8
Barisan Nasional	Malaysian Chinese Association	15	+4
Barisan Nasional	Malaysian Indian Congress	4	+2
Barisan Nasional	Parti Gerakan Rakyat Malaysia	3	+1
Barisan Nasional	Total	55	+15
Pan-Malaysian Islamic Party		1	+1
Democratic Action Party		0	0
Total		56	+16

=== Sabah ===
Party or alliance		Seats	+/–
Barisan Nasional (BN)	United Malays National Organisation (UMNO)	32	+8
Barisan Nasional (BN)	United Sabah Party (PBS)	13	-4
Barisan Nasional (BN)	United Pasokmomogun Kadazandusun Murut Organisation (UPKO)	5	New
Barisan Nasional (BN)	Sabah Progressive Party (SAPP)	4	+1
Barisan Nasional (BN)	Liberal Democratic Party (LDP)	3	+1
Barisan Nasional (BN)	Malaysian Chinese Association (MCA)	1	+1
Barisan Nasional (BN)	Parti Bersatu Rakyat Sabah (PBRS)	1	+1
Barisan Nasional (BN)	Total	59	+8
Barisan Alternatif (BA)	Pan-Malaysian Islamic Party (PAS)	0	0
Barisan Alternatif (BA)	Parti Keadilan Nasional (keADILan)	0	New
Democratic Action Party (DAP)		0	0
United Democratic Sabah People's Power Party (SETIA)		0	0
Federated Sabah People's Front (BERSEKUTU)		0	0
United Pasok Nunukragang National Organisation (PASOK)		0	0
Independents		1	+1
Total		60	+12
