= Sultan Salahuddin Abdul Aziz Shah Building =

Government building in Petaling, Selangor, Malaysia

Bangunan Sultan Salahuddin Abdul Aziz Shah
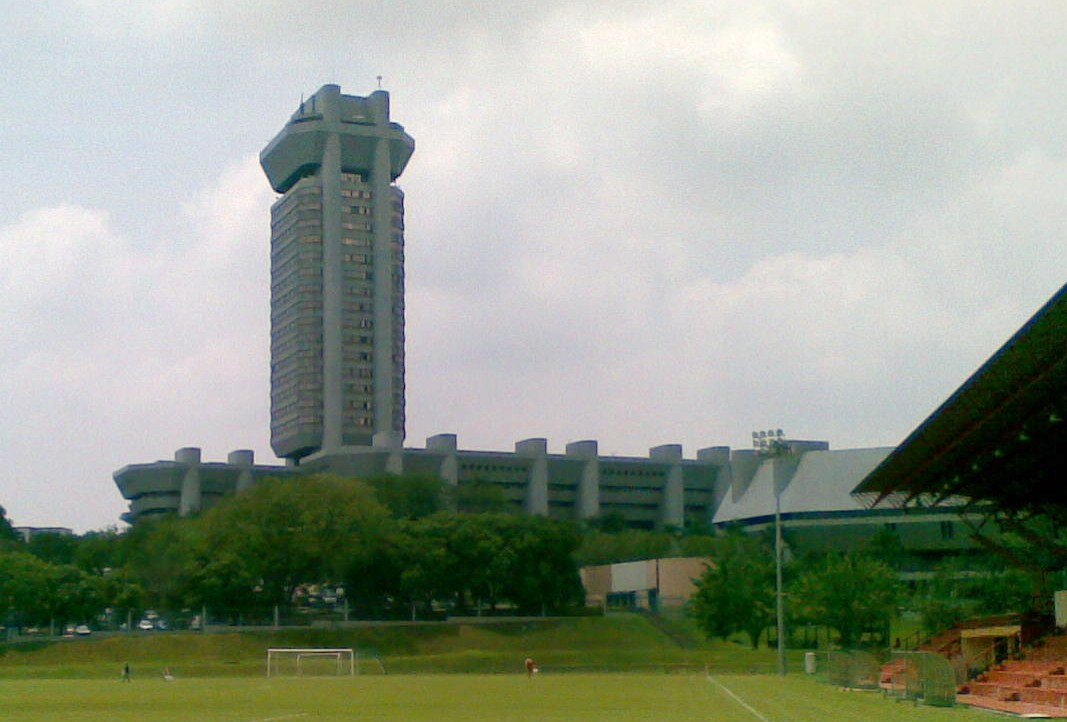
- Building located at section 5 of Shah Alam
- Interactive map of the Bangunan Sultan Salahuddin Abdul Aziz Shah area

General information
- Status: Completed
- Type: State government administrative offices and legislative building
- Location: Shah Alam, Selangor, Malaysia
- Coordinates: 3°4′59″N 101°30′55″E
- Construction started: 1982
- Completed: 1984
- Opening: 2 February 1985
- Owner: State Government of Selangor

Technical details
- Floor count: 24
- Lifts/elevators: Unknown

Design and construction
- Architect: Baharuddin Kassim

Sultan Salahuddin Abdul Aziz Building is Selangor's state secretariat building. It is located at Bukit SUK, Section 5, Shah Alam, Selangor, Malaysia. It was constructed between 1982 and 1984. The building was officially opened on 2 February 1985 by Almarhum Sultan Salahuddin Abdul Aziz Shah of Selangor. It houses the machineries of the state government, including offices of the Menteri Besar and Speaker of the State Legislative Assembly as well as the State Assembly Hall and Silver Jubilee Hall.

== Architecture ==
The building was constructed in the Brutalist style which was formerly popular in the 1980s. The Selangor State Secretariat, together with the nearby Selangor State Development Corporation (PKNS) Complex and the Malaysian Houses of Parliament, are a few notable examples of Brutalist architecture in Malaysia.
