= Ethnic Indians in the Dewan Rakyat =

There have been 65 ethnic Indians in the Dewan Rakyat since the establishment of the Parliament of Malaysia. As of 2018, there are 15 representatives, or 6.75% of the body.

There is currently one ethnic Indian woman representative in the Dewan Rakyat, Kasthuriraani Patto. The youngest representative elected in parliament at 22 years of age, Prabakaran Parameswaran is also ethnic Indian.

D.P. Vijandran (BN-MIC) is the sole Malaysian Indian legislator to hold the post of Deputy Speaker of Dewan Rakyat from 18 October 1986 to 23 February 1990.

== List of members of Indian origin ==
This is a complete list of ethnic Indians who have served as members of the Dewan Rakyat, ordered by seniority. This list includes ethnic Indians who served in the past and who continue to serve in the present.

Party	Member	Federal Constituency	Year elected	Year left
Alliance (MIC)	V. T. Sambanthan	Kinta Utara	1955	1959
Alliance (MIC)	V. T. Sambanthan	Sungei Siput	1959	1974
Alliance (MIC)	S. Chelvasingam MacIntyre	Batu Pahat	1955	1957
Socialist Front (Lab)	Veerappen Veerathan	Seberang Selatan	1959	1964
Gerakan	Veerappen Veerathan	Seberang Selatan	1971	1974
PPP	D. R. Seenivasagam	Ipoh - Menglembu	1955	1957
PPP	D. R. Seenivasagam	Ipoh	1959	1971
PPP	S. P. Seenivasagam	Menglembu	1959	1974
Socialist Front (Lab)	V. David	Bangsar	1959	1964
Gerakan	V. David	Dato' Kramat	1971	1974
DAP	V. David	Damansara	1978	1982
DAP	V. David	Puchong	1986	1995
Socialist Front(Ra'ayat)	Karam Singh Veriah	Damansara	1959	1964
Alliance (MIC)	V. Manickavasagam	Klang	1959	1974
BN (MIC)	V. Manickavasagam	Pelabuhan Kelang	1974	1979
Alliance (MIC)	T. Mahima Singh	Port Dickson	1959	1971
PAP	S. Rajaratnam	Nominated member	1959	1965
PAP	Devan Nair	Bangsar	1964	1969
DAP	Devan Nair	Bangsar	1964	1969
DAP	Peter Paul Dason	Penang Utara	1971	1974
DAP	Peter Paul Dason	Bukit Bendera	1978	1982
DAP	Peter Paul Dason	Bayan Baru	1986	1990
Gerakan	Thomas Gabriel Selvaraj	Penang Selatan	1971	1974
PPP	R. C. Mahadeva Rayan	Ipoh	1971	1974
DAP	Soorian Arjunan	Port Dickson	1971	1974
DAP	Sinnathamby Seevaratnam	Seremban Barat	1971	1974
BN (Gerakan)	Rasiah Rajasingam	Jelutong	1974	1978
BN (MIC)	Samy Vellu	Sungei Siput	1974	2008
BN (MIC)	Subramaniam Sinniah	Damansara	1974	1978
BN (MIC)	Subramaniam Sinniah	Segamat	1982	2004
BN (MIC)	Subramaniam Sinniah	Hulu Selangor	1986	1990
BN (MIC)	K. Pathmanaban	Telok Kemang	1974	1990
DAP	Karpal Singh	Jelutong	1978	1999
DAP	Karpal Singh	Bukit Gelugor	2004	2013
DAP	P. Patto	Menglembu	1978	1982
DAP	P. Patto	Ipoh	1986	1990
DAP	P. Patto	Bagan	1995	1995
BN (MIC)	V. Govindaraj	Pelabuhan Kelang	1978	1986
BN (MIC)	M. G. Pandithan	Tapah	1986	1990
BN (MIC)	D. P. Vijandran	Kapar	1986	1990
BN (Gerakan)	Dominic Joseph Puthucheary	Nibong Tebal	1990	1995
BN (MIC)	K. Kumaran	Tapah	1990	1999
BN (MIC)	Palanivel Govindasamy	Hulu Selangor	1990	2008
BN (MIC)	Palanivel Govindasamy	Cameron Highlands	2013	2018
BN (MIC)	M. Mahalingam	Kapar	1990	1995
BN (MIC)	M. Mahalingam	Subang	1995	1999
BN (MIC)	T. Marimuthu	Telok Kemang	1990	1995
DAP	M. Kulasegaran	Telok Intan	1997	1999
DAP	M. Kulasegaran	Ipoh Barat	2004	Serving
BN (MIC)	G. Leelavathi	Kapar	1995	1999
BN (MIC)	L. Krishnan	Telok Kemang	1995	1999
BN (MIC)	S. Veerasingam	Tapah	1999	2008
BN (MIC)	Karnail Singh Nijhar	Subang	1999	2008
BN (MIC)	P. Komala Devi	Kapar	1999	2008
BN (MIC)	S. A. Anpalagan	Telok Kemang	1999	2000
BN (MIC)	S. Sothinathan	Telok Kemang	2000	2008
BN (PPP)	M. Kayveas	Taiping	2004	2008
BN (MIC)	Devamany S. Krishnasamy	Cameron Highlands	2004	2008
BN (MIC)	S. Vigneswaran M. Sanasee	Kota Raja	2004	2008
BN (MIC)	Subramaniam Sathasivam	Segamat	2004	2018
IND	N Gobalakrishnan	Padang Serai	2008	2013
DAP	Ramasamy Palanisamy	Batu Kawan	2008	2013
DAP	Ramkarpal Singh	Bukit Gelugor	2008	Serving
PSM	Michael Jeyakumar Devaraj	Sungai Siput	2008	2018
BN (MIC)	Saravanan Murugan	Tapah	2008	Serving
DAP	M. Manogaran	Telok Intan	2008	2013
DAP	Gobind Singh Deo	Puchong	2008	2022
DAP	Gobind Singh Deo	Damansara	2022	Serving
PKR	Sivarasa K. Rasiah	Subang	2008	2018
PKR	Sivarasa K. Rasiah	Sungai Buloh	2018	2022
PKR	S. Manikavasagam	Kapar	2008	2013
DAP	Charles Santiago	Klang	2008	2022
DAP	John Fernandez	Seremban	2008	2013
BN (MIC)	Kamalanathan Panchanathan	Hulu Selangor	2010	2018
PKR	Surendran Nagarajan	Padang Serai	2013	2018
DAP	Kasthuriraani Patto	Batu Kawan	2013	2022
DAP	V. Sivakumar	Batu Gajah	2013	Serving
PKR	G. Manivannan	Kapar	2013	2018
PKR	Karuppaiya Muthusamy	Padang Serai	2018	2022
DAP	Sanisvara Nethaji Rayer Rajaji Rayer	Jelutong	2018	Serving
PKR	Kesavan Subramaniam	Sungai Siput	2018	Serving
BN (MIC)	Sivarraajh Chandran	Cameron Highlands	2018	2019
PKR	Xavier Jayakumar Arulanandam	Kuala Langat	2018	2022
PBM	Xavier Jayakumar Arulanandam	Kuala Langat	2018	2022
PKR	Prabakaran Parameswaran	Batu	2018	Serving
PKR	Danyal Balagopal Abdullah	Port Dickson	2018	2018
PKR	Edmund Santhara Kumar Ramanaidu	Segamat	2018	2022
PN (BERSATU)	Edmund Santhara Kumar Ramanaidu	Segamat	2018	2022
PKR	Ramanan Ramakrishnan	Sungai Buloh	2022	Serving
DAP	Ganabatirau Veraman	Klang	2022	Serving
PKR	Yuneswaran Ramaraj	Segamat	2022	Serving

== Number of ethnic Indians in the Dewan Rakyat ==
Parliament	Number of ethnic Indian members	Percentage of ethnic Indian members	Total members (including other ethnic)
1st	9	8.65%	104
1st(after 1963)	9	5.66%	159
2nd	7	4.40%	159
2nd(after 1965)	6	4.17%	144
3rd	10	6.94%	144
4th	6	3.90%	154
5th	7	4.55%	154
6th	4	2.60%	154
7th	7	3.95%	177
8th	10	5.56%	180
9th	7	3.65%	192
10th	8	4.15%	193
11th	12	5.48%	219
12th	12	5.41%	222
13th	13	5.86%	222
14th	16	7.21%	222
14th (after 2018)	15	6.75%	222
15th	11	4.95%	222
