= Govindasamy =

Govindasamy is a surname and a given name. Notable people with the name include:

Surname:

- A. Govindasamy, Indian politician and Member of the Legislative Assembly of Tamil Nadu
- C. Govindasamy, Indian politician and Member of the Legislative Assembly of Tamil Nadu
- Leelavathi Govindasamy (1944–2017), commonly known as Datuk G. Leela Rama, Malaysian politician
- Na Govindasamy (1946–1999), Singaporean educator, writer and Internet researcher
- Palanivel Govindasamy (1949–2025), Malaysian politician, MP and government minister
- Saravanan Govindasamy (born 1970), Malaysian male race walker
- Shanti Govindasamy (born 1967), Malaysian female sprint athlete
- V. C. Govindasamy (1941–2025), Indian politician, Member of the Legislative Assembly of Tamil Nadu
- Vadiveloo Govindasamy (1932–2024), Malaysian politician, president of the Malaysian Senate

Given name:

- B. Govindasamy Chettiar (1889–1948), contractor who supplied the Singapore Harbour Board with labourers
- Govindasamy Mugesh (born 1970), Indian inorganic and physical chemist, and professor
- P. Govindasamy Pillai (1887–1980), South Indian businessman and philanthropist in Singapore
- Ariranga Govindasamy Pillay (born 1945), the chief justice of Mauritius (1996–2007)
- Govindasamy Rajasekaran (1941–2023), Malaysian trade union leader
- Govindasamy Suppiah (1929–2012), Indian-born Singaporean football referee
