= Kapar (federal constituency) =

Federal constituency of Selangor, Malaysia

Kapar (P109)
Selangor constituency

Federal constituency
- Legislature: Dewan Rakyat
- MP: Halimah Ali; PN
- Constituency created: 1958
- Constituency abolished: 1974
- Constituency re-created: 1986
- First contested: 1959
- Last contested: 2022

Demographics
- Population (2020): 314,033
- Electors (2023): 192,383
- Area (km²): 362
- Pop. density (per km²): 867.5

Kapar is a federal constituency in Klang District and Petaling District, Selangor, Malaysia, that has been represented in the Dewan Rakyat from 1959 to 1974, from 1986 to present.

The federal constituency was created in the 1958 redistribution and is mandated to return a single member to the Dewan Rakyat under the first past the post voting system.

== Demographics ==
Ethnic breakdown of Kapar's electorate as of 2018
1. Malay (70.5%)
2. Chinese (15.2%)
3. Indian (13.9%)
4. Other ethnicities (0.40%)

== History ==
It was abolished in 1974 when it was redistributed between Kuala Selangor and Pelabuhan Kelang. It was re-created in 1984 from parts of Kuala Selangor and Pelabuhan Kelang.

=== Polling districts ===
According to the federal gazette issued on 18 July 2023, the Kapar constituency is divided into 44 polling districts.

State constituency	Polling Districts	Code	Location
Meru (N42）	Kampung Meru	109/42/01	SRA Bukit Kapar Timur
Meru (N42）	Kampung Haji Shariff	109/42/02	SK Meru (2)
Meru (N42）	Kampung Nenas	109/42/03	SRA Pekan Meru; SRA Meru 2
Meru (N42）	Pekan Meru	109/42/04	SMK Meru
Meru (N42）	Jalan Haji Salleh	109/42/05	SJK (C) Tiong Hua Kok Bin; SJK (C) Pin Hwa 1 Klang
Meru (N42）	Taman Meru Indah	109/42/06	SK Meru (Jalan Tap) Persiaran Hamzah Alang
Meru (N42）	Pekan Kapar	109/42/07	SMK Tengku Idris Shah Kapar
Meru (N42）	Batu 9 Kapar	109/42/08	SK Kapar
Meru (N42）	Batu 10 Kapar	109/42/09	SMK (P) Kapar
Meru (N42）	Sungai Kapar Indah	109/42/10	SK Sungai Kapar Indah
Meru (N42）	Taman Kapar Indah	109/42/11	SJK (C) Soo Jin Kapar
Meru (N42）	Kampung Budiman	109/42/12	KAFA Integrasi Imam Al-Ghazali Kampung Budiman
Sementa (N43）	Kampung Sungai Serdang	109/43/01	SK Sungai Serdang Kapar
Sementa (N43）	Kampung Tok Muda	109/43/02	SK Tok Muda Kapar
Sementa (N43）	Perepat	109/43/03	SRA Kampung Perepat
Sementa (N43）	Sementa	109/43/04	SRA Sementa
Sementa (N43）	Kampung Batu Empat	109/43/05	SMK Rantau Panjang
Sementa (N43）	Batu 11 & 12 Kapar	109/43/06	SRA Pekan Kapar
Sementa (N43）	Taman Sri Kerayong	109/43/07	Dewan Sri Kerayong
Sementa (N43）	Taman Chempaka Sari	109/43/08	SRA Batu 4 Jalan Haji Sirat
Sementa (N43）	Kapar	109/43/09	SJK (T) Methodist Kapar
Sementa (N43）	Bukit Kapar Utara	109/43/10	SK Bukit Kapar
Sementa (N43）	Bukit Kapar Selatan	109/43/11	SRA Bukit Kapar Barat
Sementa (N43）	Kampung Sungai Pinang	109/43/12	Dewan Sungai Pinang
Sementa (N43）	Rantau Panjang	109/43/13	SK Rantau Panjang Klang
Sementa (N43）	Kampung Batu Tiga	109/43/14	SRA Nurul Ehsan Batu 3 Sungai Pinang
Sementa (N43）	Teluk Kapas	109/43/15	SRA Rantau Panjang
Sementa (N43）	Taman Klang Perdana	109/43/16	SK Sementa
Selat Klang（N44）	Sungai Udang Utara	109/44/01	SRA Darul Ulum Sungai Udang Klang
Selat Klang（N44）	Jalan Yadi	109/44/02	SK Telok Gadong
Selat Klang（N44）	Kampong Delek	109/44/03	Dewan Orang Ramai Kampung Delek
Selat Klang（N44）	Sungai Sirih	109/44/04	Balai Raya Kampung Sungai Sireh Tambahan 2
Selat Klang（N44）	Kuala Klang	109/44/05	SA Rakyat (KAFA Integrasi) Al-Hidayah Kampung Keretapi Pelabuhan Klang
Selat Klang（N44）	Sri Perantau	109/44/06	Gelanggang Serbaguna Pangsapuri Seri Perantau
Selat Klang（N44）	Tanjong Klang	109/44/07	Gelanggang Bola Keranjang Kampung Bagan Hailam
Selat Klang（N44）	Sungai Lama	109/44/08	SJK (C) Sin Bin Sungai Lima Pulau Ketam
Selat Klang（N44）	Bandar Pulau Ketam	109/44/09	SJK (C) Hwa Lien Pulau Ketam
Selat Klang（N44）	Bagan Teo Chew	109/44/10	SJK (C) Keng Chee Pulau Ketam
Selat Klang（N44）	Sungai Udang Selatan	109/44/11	SMK Telok Gadong
Selat Klang（N44）	Kampong Delek Kanan	109/44/12	SRA Kampung Delek
Selat Klang（N44）	Kampong Delek Kiri	109/44/13	SR Islam Integrasi Al-Farabi
Selat Klang（N44）	Bandar Sultan Sulaiman	109/44/14	SK Pelabuhan Utara Bandar Sultan Sulaiman
Selat Klang（N44）	Kampung Raja Uda Timur	109/44/15	SK Kampung Raja Uda
Selat Klang（N44）	Kampung Raja Uda Barat	109/44/16	SRA Kampung Raja Uda

=== Representation history ===
Members of Parliament for Kapar
Parliament	No	Years	Member	Party	Vote Share
Constituency created from Selangor Tengah
Parliament of the Federation of Malaya
1st	P067	1959–1963	Hamzah Alang (حمزه الڠ)	Alliance (UMNO)	5,335; 46.40%
Parliament of Malaysia
1st	P067	1963–1964	Hamzah Alang (حمزه الڠ)	Alliance (UMNO)	5,335; 46.40%
2nd	P067	1964–1969	Hamzah Alang (حمزه الڠ)	Alliance (UMNO)	9,937; 58.61%
		1969–1971	Parliament was suspended		
3rd	P067	1971	Hamzah Alang (حمزه الڠ)	Alliance (UMNO)	7,781; 43.38%
3rd	P067	1971–1973	Mohd Tahir Abdul Manan (محمد طاهر عبدالمانن)	Alliance (UMNO)	12,314; 77.61%
3rd	P067	1973–1974	Mohd Tahir Abdul Manan (محمد طاهر عبدالمانن)	BN (UMNO)	12,314; 77.61%
Constituency abolished, merged into Kuala Selangor and Pelabuhan Kelang
Constituency re-created from Kuala Selangor and Pelabuhan Kelang
7th	P086	1986–1990	D. P. Vijandran (டி.பி.விஜந்திரன்)	BN (MIC)	20,938; 70.65%
8th	P086	1990–1995	M. Mahalingam (எம்.மஹாலிங்கம்)	BN (MIC)	22,038; 58.23%
9th	P099	1995–1999	Leelavathi Govindasamy (லீலவதி கோவிந்தசாமி)	BN (MIC)	32,283; 69.62%
10th	P099	1999–2004	Komala Devi Perumal (கோமலா தேவி பெருமாள)	BN (MIC)	27,830; 50.68%
11th	P109	2004–2008	Komala Devi Perumal (கோமலா தேவி பெருமாள)	BN (MIC)	44,007; 59.93%
12th	P109	2008–2013	Manikavasagam Sundram (மாணிக்கவாசகம் சுந்தரம்)	PR (PKR)	48,196; 57.31
13th	P109	2013–2015	Manivannan Gowindasamy (மணிவண்ணன் கோவிந்தசாமி)	PR (PKR)	69,894; 56.17%
13th	P109	2015–2018	Manivannan Gowindasamy (மணிவண்ணன் கோவிந்தசாமி)	PH (PKR)	69,894; 56.17%
14th	P109	2018–2022	Abdullah Sani Abdul Hamid (عبدالله ثاني عبدالحميد)	PH (PKR)	47,731; 44.99%
15th	P109	2022–present	Halimah Ali (حليمة بنت علي)	PN (PAS)	65,751; 41.61%

=== State constituency ===
Parliamentary constituency	State constituency						
Parliamentary constituency	1955–59*	1959–1974	1974–1986	1986–1995	1995–2004	2004–2018	2018–present
Kapar		Jeram		Jeram			
Kapar					Meru		
Kapar				Selat Klang			
Kapar		Sementa		Sementa			
Kapar						Sungai Pinang	

=== Historical boundaries ===
State Constituency	Area				
State Constituency	1959	1984	1994	2003	2018
Jeram	Bukit Kapar; Bukit Raja; Jeram; Sasaran; Sungai Sembilang	Jeram; Puncak Alam; Sasaran; Simpang Tiga; Sungai Sembilang			
Meru			Bukit Cherakah; Bukit Raja; Meru; Setia Alam; U10 - 11 Shah Alam	Bukit Cherakah; Bukit Raja; Kapar; Meru; U15 Shah Alam	Bukit Cherakah; Meru; Sungai Kapar Indah; Taman Seri Residensi; U15 Shah Alam
Selat Klang		Bandar Sultan Suleiman; Kampung Delek; Pulau Indah; Pulau Ketam; Rantau Panjang	Kampung Delek; Pulau Ketam; Pulau Indah; Sungai Udang; Teluk Pulai	Jalan Sireh; Kampung Delek; Pulau Ketam; Sungai Udang; Teluk Pulai	Bagan Hailam; Bandar Sultan Suleiman; Kampung Delek; Pulau Ketam; Tanjung Harapan
Sementa	Bandar Sultan Suleiman; Kapar; Rantau Panjang; Sementa; Tanjung Harapan	Kapar; Sementa; Sungai Kapar Indah; Taman Klang Utama; Taman Seri Residensi	Bandar Sultan Suleiman; Rantau Panjang; Sementa; Sungai Kapar Indah; Taman Klang Utama	Bandar Sultan Suleiman; Sementa; Sungai Kapar Indah; Taman Klang Utama; Taman Seri Residensi	Bukit Kapar; Kapar; Rantau Panjang; Sementa; Sungai Pinang
Sungai Pinang				Jalan Meru; Rantau Panjang; Sungai Pinang; Taman Eng Ann; Tanjung Sawal	

=== Current state assembly members ===
No.	State Constituency	Member	Coalition (Party)
N42	Meru	Mariam Abdul Rashid	PH (AMANAH)
N43	Sementa	Noor Najhan Mohamad Salleh	PN (PAS)
N44	Selat Klang	Abdul Rashid Asari	Independent

=== Local governments & postcodes ===
No.	State Constituency	Local Government	Postcode
N42	Meru	Shah Alam City Council (Bukit Cherakah area); Klang City Council	40150, 40170 Shah Alam; 41050, 41100, 41250, 41300, 41400, 42100 Klang; 42000 Port Klang; 42200 Kapar; 42920 Pulau Indah; 42940 Pulau Ketam
N43	Sementa	Klang City Council	40150, 40170 Shah Alam; 41050, 41100, 41250, 41300, 41400, 42100 Klang; 42000 Port Klang; 42200 Kapar; 42920 Pulau Indah; 42940 Pulau Ketam
N44	Selat Klang	Klang City Council	40150, 40170 Shah Alam; 41050, 41100, 41250, 41300, 41400, 42100 Klang; 42000 Port Klang; 42200 Kapar; 42920 Pulau Indah; 42940 Pulau Ketam

== Election results ==
Malaysian general election, 2022
Party	Candidate	Votes	%	∆%
PN	Halimah Ali	65,751	41.61	▲41.61
PH	Abdullah Sani Abdul Hamid	53,969	34.15	▲34.15
BN	Muhammad Noor Azman	35,079	22.20	▼2.70
PBM	Daroyah Alwi	1,474	0.93	▲0.93
PEJUANG	Mohd Pathan Hussin	1,015	0.64	▲0.64
Independent	VP Sevelinggam	477	0.30	▲0.30
Heritage	Rahim Awang	265	0.17	▲0.17
Total valid votes		158,030	100.00	
Total rejected ballots		1,464		
Unreturned ballots		206		
Turnout		159,700	83.45	▼2.82
Registered electors		189,369		
Majority		11,782	7.46	▼7.91
PN gain from PKR		Swing		?
Source(s) https://lom.agc.gov.my/ilims/upload/portal/akta/outputp/1753283/PUB612.pdf

Malaysian general election, 2018
Party	Candidate	Votes	%	∆%
PKR	Abdullah Sani Abdul Hamid	47,731	44.99	▼11.18
PAS	Abd Rani Osman	31,425	29.62	▲29.62
BN	Mohana Muniandy Raman	26,412	24.90	▼12.15
Parti Rakyat Malaysia	Manikavasagam Sundaram	525	0.49	▲0.49
Total valid votes		106,093	100.00	
Total rejected ballots		1,497		
Unreturned ballots		239		
Turnout		107,829	86.27	▼1.84
Registered electors		124,983		
Majority		16,306	15.37	▼3.75
PKR hold		Swing		
Source(s) "His Majesty's Government Gazette - Notice of Contested Election, Parliament for the State of Selangor [P.U. (B) 239/2018]" (PDF). Attorney General's Chambers of Malaysia. 3 May 2018. Archived from the original (PDF) on 2019-07-19. "Federal Government Gazette - Results of Contested Election and Statements of the Poll after the Official Addition of Votes, Parliamentary Constituencies for the State of Selangor [P.U. (B) 313/2018]" (PDF). Attorney General's Chambers of Malaysia. 28 May 2018. Archived from the original (PDF) on 2019-07-19.

Malaysian general election, 2013
Party	Candidate	Votes	%	∆%
PKR	G Manivannan Gowindasamy	69,849	56.17	▼1.14
BN	Sakthivel Alagappan	46,059	37.05	▼5.64
Pan-Malaysian Islamic Front	Mohd Pathan Hussin	6,289	5.06	▲5.06
Independent	Norhamzah Suratman	1,067	0.86	▲0.86
Independent	Mohd Nazri Abdul Aziz	835	0.67	▲0.67
Independent	Palaya Rengaiah	231	0.19	▲0.19
Total valid votes		124,330	100.00	
Total rejected ballots		2,379		
Unreturned ballots		314		
Turnout		127,023	88.11	▲10.33
Registered electors		144,159		
Majority		23,790	19.12	▼4.50
PKR hold		Swing		
Source(s) "Federal Government Gazette - Notice of Contested Election, Parliament for the State of Selangor [P.U. (B) 176/2013]" (PDF). Attorney General's Chambers of Malaysia. 26 April 2013. Archived from the original (PDF) on 2018-09-30. "Federal Government Gazette - Results of Contested Election and Statements of the Poll after the Official Addition of Votes, Parliamentary Constituencies for the State of Selangor [P.U. (B) 217/2013]" (PDF). Attorney General's Chambers of Malaysia. 22 May 2013. Archived from the original (PDF) on 2018-09-30.

Malaysian general election, 2008
Party	Candidate	Votes	%	∆%
PKR	Manikavasagam Sundaram	48,196	57.31	▲17.24
BN	Komala Devi M Perumal	35,899	42.69	▼17.24
Total valid votes		84,095	100.00	
Total rejected ballots		3,064		
Unreturned ballots		127		
Turnout		87,286	77.78	▲5.04
Registered electors		112,224		
Majority		12,297	14.62	▼5.24
PKR gain from BN		Swing		?

Malaysian general election, 2004
Party	Candidate	Votes	%	∆%
BN	Komala Devi M Perumal	44,007	59.93	▲9.25
PKR	Ang Hiok Gai	29,419	40.07	▲40.07
Total valid votes		73,426	100.00	
Total rejected ballots		2,356		
Unreturned ballots		7		
Turnout		75,789	72.74	▼2.50
Registered electors		104,185		
Majority		14,588	19.86	▲14.65
BN hold		Swing		

Malaysian general election, 1999
Party	Candidate	Votes	%	∆%
BN	Komala Devi M Perumal	27,830	50.68	▼18.94
PAS	Dzulkefly Ahmad	24,970	45.47	▲45.47
Independent	N. Tamilarasan @ Kim Chai	2,112	3.85	▲3.85
Total valid votes		54,912	100.00	
Total rejected ballots		1,116		
Unreturned ballots		32		
Turnout		56,060	75.24	▲1.83
Registered electors		74,502		
Majority		2,860	5.21	▼34.03
BN hold		Swing		

Malaysian general election, 1995
Party	Candidate	Votes	%	∆%
BN	Leelavathi Govindasamy	33,283	69.62	▲11.39
S46	Sanad Said	14,524	30.38	▼11.39
Total valid votes		47,807	100.00	
Total rejected ballots		1,678		
Unreturned ballots		110		
Turnout		49,595	73.41	▼0.46
Registered electors		67,555		
Majority		18,759	39.24	▲2.78
BN hold		Swing		

Malaysian general election, 1990
Party	Candidate	Votes	%	∆%
BN	M. Mahalingam	22,038	58.23	▼12.42
S46	Sanad Said	15,811	41.77	▲41.77
Total valid votes		37,849	100.00	
Total rejected ballots		1,511		
Unreturned ballots				
Turnout		39,360	73.87	▲4.23
Registered electors		53,280		
Majority		6,227	16.46	▼24.84
BN hold		Swing		

Malaysian general election, 1986
Party	Candidate	Votes	%	∆%
BN	D. P. Vijandran	20,938	70.65	
PAS	Aziz Hamzah	8,697	29.35	
Total valid votes		29,635	100.00	
Total rejected ballots		957		
Unreturned ballots				
Turnout		30,592	69.64	
Registered electors		43,928		
Majority		12,241	41.30	
BN gain from Alliance		Swing		?

Malaysian general by-election, 3 April 1971 Upon the death of incumbent, Hamzah Alang
Party	Candidate	Votes	%	∆%
Alliance	Mohd Tahir Abdul Manan	12,314	77.61	▲34.23
PMIP	Mohamed Jais Fatahur Rahman	3,552	22.39	▲3.32
Total valid votes		15,866	100.00	
Total rejected ballots				
Unreturned ballots				
Turnout				
Registered electors		26,370		
Majority		8,762	55.22	▲49.39
Alliance hold		Swing		

Malaysian general election, 1969
Party	Candidate	Votes	%	∆%
Alliance	Hamzah Alang	7,781	43.38	▼15.23
DAP	Au Keng Wah	6,734	37.55	▲37.55
PMIP	Awang Ansari Ahmad	3,420	19.07	▲6.16
Total valid votes		17,935	100.00	
Total rejected ballots		1,033		
Unreturned ballots		0		
Turnout		18,968	71.94	▼6.96
Registered electors		26,368		
Majority		1,047	5.83	▼24.30
Alliance hold		Swing		

Malaysian general election, 1964
Party	Candidate	Votes	%	∆%
Alliance	Hamzah Alang	9,937	58.61	▲12.21
Socialist Front	Zailani Sulaiman	4,829	28.48	▲28.48
PMIP	Awang Ansari Ahmad	2,188	12.91	▼12.78
Total valid votes		16,954	100.00	
Total rejected ballots		979		
Unreturned ballots		0		
Turnout		17,933	78.90	▲2.12
Registered electors		22,730		
Majority		5,108	30.13	▼6.37
Alliance hold		Swing		

Malayan general election, 1959
Party	Candidate	Votes	%
Alliance	Hamzah Alang	5,335	46.40
PPP	R. Madhavan	3,208	27.90
PMIP	Ibrahim Nordin	2,954	25.69
Total valid votes		11,497	100.00
Total rejected ballots		137	
Unreturned ballots		0	
Turnout		11,634	76.78
Registered electors		15,152	
Majority		2,127	36.50
This was a new constituency created.
