= Meru (state constituency) =

State constituency in Selangor, Malaysia

Meru (N42)
Selangor constituency

State constituency
- Legislature: Selangor State Legislative Assembly
MLA
Mariam Abdul Rashid
PH
- Constituency created: 1994
- First contested: 1995
- Last contested: 2023

Demographics
- Electors (2023): 65,801

Meru is a state constituency in Selangor, Malaysia, that has been represented in the Selangor State Legislative Assembly since 1995.

The state constituency was created in the 1994 redistribution and is mandated to return a single member to the Selangor State Legislative Assembly under the first past the post voting system.

== Demographics ==
Ethnic breakdown of Meru's electorate as of 2023
1. Malay (57.1%)
2. Indian (24.5%)
3. Chinese (16.7%)
4. Other ethnicities (1.66%)

== History ==
=== Polling districts ===
According to the federal gazette issued on 30 March 2018, the Meru constituency is divided into 12 polling districts.

State constituency	Polling Districts	Code	Location
Meru (N42）	Kampung Meru	109/42/01	SRA Bukit Kapar Timur
Meru (N42）	Kampung Haji Shariff	109/42/02	SK Meru (2)
Meru (N42）	Kampung Nenas	109/42/03	SRA Pekan Meru
Meru (N42）	Pekan Meru	109/42/04	SMK Meru
Meru (N42）	Jalan Haji Salleh	109/42/05	SJK (C) Tiong Hua Kok Bin
Meru (N42）	Taman Meru Indah	109/42/06	SK Meru (Jalan Tap) Persiaran Hamzah Alang
Meru (N42）	Pekan Kapar	109/42/07	SMK Tengku Idris Shah Kapar
Meru (N42）	Batu 9 Kapar	109/42/08	SK Kapar
Meru (N42）	Batu 10 Kapar	019/01/09	SMK (P) Kapar
Meru (N42）	Sungai Kapar Indah	109/42/10	SK Sungai Kapar Indah
Meru (N42）	Taman Kapar Indah	109/42/11	SJK (C) Soo Jin Kapar
Meru (N42）	Kampung Budiman	109/42/12	Balai JKKK Kampung Budiman

=== Representation history ===
Members of the Legislative Assembly for Meru
Assembly	No	Years	Member	Party
Constituency split from Sementa, Batu Tiga and Subang
9th	N38	1995-1999	Jaei Ismail	BN (UMNO)
10th	N38	1999-2004	Jaei Ismail	BN (UMNO)
11th	N42	2004-2008	Jaei Ismail	BN (UMNO)
12th	N42	2008-2013	Abd Rani Osman	PR (PAS)
13th	N42	2013-2018	Abd Rani Osman	PR (PAS)
14th	N42	2018-2020	Mohd Fakhrulrazi Mohd Mokhtar	PH (AMANAH)
14th	N42	2020-2023	Mohd Fakhrulrazi Mohd Mokhtar	PH (PKR)
15th	N42	2023–present	Mariam Abdul Rashid	PH (AMANAH)

== Election results ==
Selangor state election, 2023
Party	Candidate	Votes	%	∆%
PH	Mariam Abdul Rashid	26,980	52.45	▲0.39
PN	Hasnizam Adham	23,558	45.78	▲45.78
Parti Sosialis Malaysia	Sivaranjani Manickam	899	1.75	▲1.75
Total valid votes		51,437	100.00	
Total rejected ballots		308		
Unreturned ballots		63		
Turnout		51,808	76.73	▼11.39
Registered electors		65,801		
Majority		3,422	6.67	▼21.64
PH hold		Swing		

Selangor state election, 2018
Party	Candidate	Votes	%	∆%
PKR	Mohd Fakhrulrazi Mohd Mokhtar	17,665	52.04	▲52.04
BN	Khairul Anuar Saimun	8,057	23.74	▼13.32
PAS	Noor Najhan Mohamad Salleh	7,804	22.99	▼39.95
Parti Rakyat Malaysia	Manikavasagam Sundaram	346	1.02	▲1.02
Independent	Shee Chee Weng	72	0.21	▲0.21
Total valid votes		33,944	100.00	
Total rejected ballots		430		
Unreturned ballots		74		
Turnout		34,448	88.12	▼1.91
Registered electors		39,091		
Majority		9,608	28.31	▲2.43
PKR gain from PAS		Swing		.

Selangor state election, 2013
Party	Candidate	Votes	%	∆%
PAS	Abd Rani Osman	22,086	62.94	▲1.52
BN	Sukaiman Ahmad	13,007	37.06	▼1.52
Total valid votes		35,093	100.00	
Total rejected ballots		343		
Unreturned ballots		87		
Turnout		35,523	90.03	▲7.61
Registered electors		39,457		
Majority		9,079	25.88	▲3.04
PAS hold		Swing		
Source(s) "Federal Government Gazette - Notice of Contested Election, State Legislative Assembly for the State of Selangor [P.U. (B) 192/2013]" (PDF). Attorney General's Chambers of Malaysia. 26 April 2013. "Federal Government Gazette - Results of Contested Election and Statements of the Poll after the Official Addition of Votes, State Constituencies for the State of Selangor [P.U. (B) 233/2013]" (PDF). Attorney General's Chambers of Malaysia. 22 May 2013.

Selangor state election, 2008
Party	Candidate	Votes	%	∆%
PAS	Abd Rani Osman	14,826	61.42	▲21.88
BN	Md Ghazali Md Amin	9,313	38.58	▼21.88
Total valid votes		24,139	100.00	
Total rejected ballots		339		
Unreturned ballots		37		
Turnout		24,515	82.42	▲7.98
Registered electors		29,745		
Majority		5,513	22.84	▲1.92
PAS gain from BN		Swing		?

Selangor state election, 2004
Party	Candidate	Votes	%	∆%
BN	Jaei Ismail	11,850	60.46	▲2.85
PAS	Abd Rani Osman	7,751	39.54	▼2.85
Total valid votes		19,601	100.00	
Total rejected ballots		299		
Unreturned ballots		4		
Turnout		19,904	74.44	▼4.84
Registered electors		26,737		
Majority		4,099	20.92	▲5.70
BN hold		Swing		

Selangor state election, 1999
Party	Candidate	Votes	%	∆%
BN	Jaei Ismail	10,084	57.61	▼22.80
PAS	Noor Najhan Mohamad Salleh	7,421	42.39	▲42.39
Total valid votes		17,505	100.00	
Total rejected ballots		274		
Unreturned ballots		13		
Turnout		17,792	79.28	▲1.64
Registered electors		22,441		
Majority		2,663	15.22	▼45.60
BN hold		Swing		

Selangor state election, 1995
Party	Candidate	Votes	%
BN	Jaei Ismail	12,716	80.41
S46	Shareh Mansor	3,098	19.59
Total valid votes		15,814	100.00
Total rejected ballots		413	
Unreturned ballots		29	
Turnout		16,256	77.64
Registered electors		20,937	
Majority		9,618	60.82
This was a new constituency created.
