= B. Govindasamy Chettiar =

Indian-Singaporean contractor and philanthropist

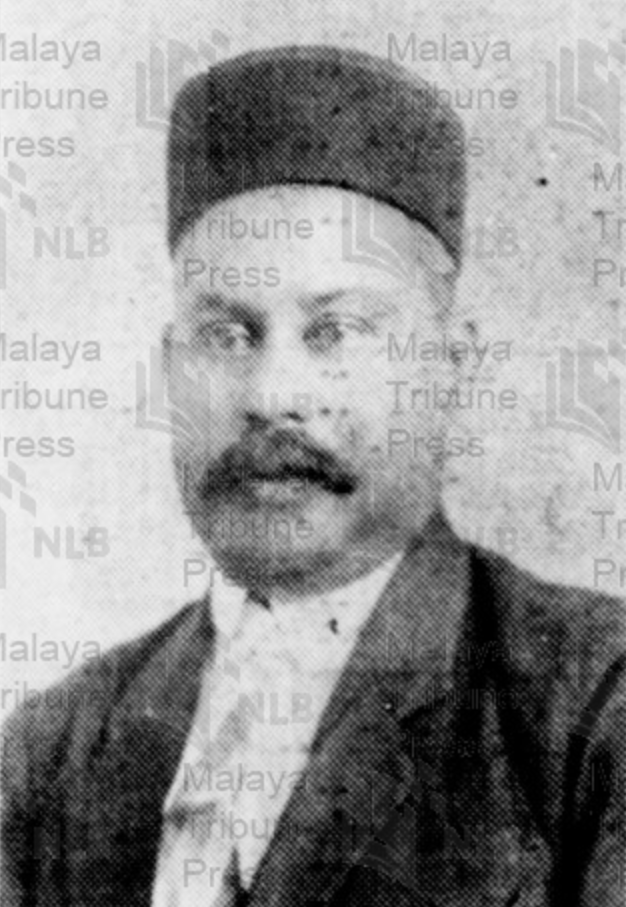
Govindasamy in 1938.

Balaguru Govindasamy Chettiar (5 September 1889 – 6 April 1948) was a contractor who supplied the Singapore Harbour Board with labourers. He eventually became one of the board's three major contractors. A philanthropist, he helped fund the construction of several local religious buildings and the renovations of the Sri Mariamman Temple, being a member of its management committee.

== Early life ==
Govindasamy was born in India on 5 September 1889. His parents came from the villages of Komalammal, which was in Southern India, Thirunaapalli and Udayarpalayam. According to his nephew S. L. Perumal, the entire family was mostly split between these three villages. Perumal also claimed that it was 'tradition' for men in the family to come to Southeast Asia for work. Govindasamy received his education at the Tamil School in the French Thirumalairayan town.

== Career ==
Govindasamy came to Singapore as a young adult in the mid-1900s. He began working for Mohammed Yusoff, a contractor who supplied labourers to the Singapore Harbour Board, as a clerk. In December 1921, he entered a business partnership with Farid Serang, forming the Tamil Labour Company, a contracting firm which succeeded Yusoff as the Singapore Harbour Board's labour contractors. They provided the board with Indian and Chinese labourers to work at the wharves and dockyards. Following the death of Farid Serang in 1933, his son, K. P. Mohammed Yusoff, succeeded him as Govindasamy's partner and the business was renamed the Indian Labour Company. His offices and the company's labourers' quarters were located along Keppel Road, opposite where the old Custom Operations Command building presently stands.

According to Laura Yan, the business initially "seemed to function like a family firm", with family members or other residents of the villages his family lived in being recruited as labourers. Eventually, however, most of Govindasamy's labourers were hired from villages in India through recruiters due to the local labour shortage. Migrants were also recruited as labourers. Yan stated that Govindasamy "conceived of generosity and donations as exchange for labor." Perumal claimed that Govindasamy's workers would approach him for donations, advances or other benefits individually as there was no formal benefits system. Yan wrote that it was through this that Govindasamy "presented" himself as a leader of the local Tamil community. However, she notes that, like the other harbour contractors, Govindasamy "made sure to foster and maintain ethnic divisions amongst workers." Roots.sg stated that he was "well known for distributing free meals at his shed to port workers and to members of the community", and that he had come to be known as "Kottai Govindasamy" for this reason. He continued to work as a port contractor during the Japanese Occupation of Singapore, which lasted from February 1942 to September 1945. However, The partnership between him and K. P. Mohammed Yusoff ended in February 1942. By his death, Govindasamy had become one of the three major labour contractors at the harbour following the end of the occupation, along with Tan Chong Chew and Ching Kee Sun. As he did not have a formal benefits system, he was not subject to union negotiations and regulations. However, his business ended when the Singapore Harbour Board instead turned to hiring labourers directly in early 1948.

In January 1930, Govindasamy was elected a member of the managing committee of the India-Ceylon Club in Singapore. In February of the following year, he was elected a member of the Hindu Advisory Board of Singapore. Govindasamy was elected the vice-president of the Singapore Indian Association at a general meeting held on 28 February. He was also the association's trustee of immovable properties. However, he resigned from this position by December and was succeeded by K. Raghunathan. In May 1934, he was elected a member of the committee for the Ramakrishna Mission in Singapore. Govindasamy, fellow community leader Vayloo Pakirisamy Pillai, M. Vaithilingam Pillay and A. Tharumalingam Pillay were appointed by the Hindu Endowments Board in May 1935 to serve on the management committee of both the Sri Mariamman Temple on South Bridge Road and the Sri Srinivasa Perumal Temple on Serangoon Road. He helped fund renovation works which were carried out on the Sri Mariamman Temple. In July 1938, Govindasamy was appointed a Justice of the Peace. The Singapore Indian Association then staged an "At Home" at the Victoria Memorial Hall in tribute. This was reportedly attended by "several leading Indians of the city, besides prominent men of other nationalities." By then, he had also helped fund the construction of the Ramakrishna Mission Building on Norris Road, the Masjid Sultan and a prayer hall in Bukit Timah. In July 1941, he was elected a member of the committee of the Southern Indian Chamber of Commerce in Singapore. In the 1940s, Govindasamy helped manage the Sri Vadapathira Kaliamman Temple.

== Personal life and death ==
Govindasamy was Hindu. He lived on Cantonment Road. Govindasamy died in his home on 6 April 1948. The funeral, held later that day, reportedly "attracted attendees from all races." On Govindasamy's death, all labourers at the Singapore Harbour Board who were of Chinese and Indian ethnicity stopped working for four hours. According to Laura Yan, this was significant not only due to the decline of contractors but also because "unity was fraught between Chinese and Indian laborers on the waterfront." Govindasamy has been posthumously inducted into the Indian Hall of Fame Singapore. He was also awarded the organisation's Navroji Mistri Excellence Award For Philanthropy.
