= Abd Rani Osman =

Malaysian politician (1958–2023)

Member of the Selangor State Legislative Assembly for Meru
- In office 8 March 2008 – 9 May 2018
- Preceded by: Jaei Ismail (BN–UMNO)
- Succeeded by: Mohd Fakhrulrazi Mohd Mokhtar (PH–AMANAH)
- Majority: 5,513 (2008); 9,079 (2013)

Personal details
- Born: 14 April 1958 Pelabuhan Klang, Selangor, Federation of Malaya (now Malaysia)
- Died: 23 January 2023 (aged 64) Selangor, Malaysia
- Citizenship: Malaysian
- Party: Malaysian Islamic Party (PAS)
- Other political affiliations: Perikatan Nasional (PN); Muafakat Nasional (MN); Gagasan Sejahtera (GS); Pakatan Rakyat (PR); Barisan Alternatif (BA)
- Education: Tanta University
- Occupation: Politician
- Profession: Doctor

Abd Rani bin Osman (14 April 1958 – 23 January 2023) was a Malaysian politician who served as Member of the Selangor State Assembly for Meru from 2008 to 2018. A member of the Malaysian Islamic Party (PAS), a component of Perikatan Nasional (PN) coalition. He died from heart disease on 23 January 2023, at the age of 64.

== Election results ==
Selangor State Legislative Assembly
Year	Constituency	Candidate	Votes	Pct	Opponent(s)	Votes	Pct	Ballots cast	Majority	Turnout
2004	N42 Meru	Abd Rani Osman (PAS)	7,751	39.54%	Jaei Ismail (UMNO)	11,850	60.46%	19,904	4,099	74.44%
2008	N42 Meru	Abd Rani Osman (PAS)	14,826	61.42%	Md Ghazali Md Amin (UMNO)	9,313	38.58%	24,515	5,513	82.42%
2013	N42 Meru	Abd Rani Osman (PAS)	22,086	62.94%	Sukaiman Ahmad (UMNO)	13,007	37.06%	35,523	9,079	90.03%

Parliament of Malaysia
Year	Constituency	Candidate	Votes	Pct	Opponent(s)	Votes	Pct	Ballots cast	Majority	Turnout
2018	P109 Kapar	Abd Rani Osman (PAS)	31,425	29.62%	Abdullah Sani Abdul Hamid (PKR)	47,731	44.99%	107,829	16,306	86.27%
2018	P109 Kapar	Abd Rani Osman (PAS)	31,425	29.62%	Mohana Muniandy Raman (MIC)	26,412	24.90%	107,829	16,306	86.27%
2018	P109 Kapar	Abd Rani Osman (PAS)	31,425	29.62%	Manikavasagam Sundaram (PRM)	525	0.49%	107,829	16,306	86.27%
