= Daroyah Alwi =

Malaysian politician and dentist

Dr. Daroyah Alwi PJK
- ضروية ألوي
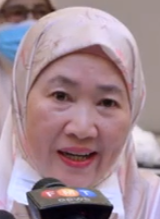

Deputy Speaker of the Selangor State Legislative Assembly
- In office 18 March 2019 – 13 June 2020
- Monarch: Sharafuddin
- Menteri Besar: Amirudin Shari
- Speaker: Ng Suee Lim
- Preceded by: Mohd Khairuddin Othman
- Succeeded by: Hasnul Baharuddin
- Constituency: Sementa

Member of the Selangor State Executive Council (Health, Entrepreneur Development, Science, Technology and Innovation : 30 May 2013–26 September 2014) (Health, Welfare, Woman Affairs and Family : 26 September 2014–18 May 2018)
- In office 30 May 2013 – 13 May 2018
- Monarch: Sharafuddin
- Menteri Besar: Khalid Ibrahim (2013–2014); Azmin Ali (2014–2018)
- Preceded by: Xavier Jayakumar Arulanandam (Health); Yaakob Sapari (Entrepreneur Development); Rodziah Ismail (Science, Technology and Innovation)
- Succeeded by: Siti Mariah Mahmud
- Constituency: Sementa

Member of the Selangor State Legislative Assembly for Sementa
- In office 5 May 2013 – 12 August 2023
- Preceded by: Abd Rahman Palil (BN–UMNO)
- Succeeded by: Noor Najhan Mohamad Salleh (PN–PAS)
- Majority: 7,846 (2013); 5,370 (2018)

Personal details
- Born: Daroyah binti Alwi; 21 August 1962 (age 64) Kampung Bukit Kapar, Meru, Klang, Selangor, Malaysia
- Citizenship: Malaysian
- Party: People's Justice Party (PKR) (–2020); Independent (2020–2021); Parti Bangsa Malaysia (PBM) (since 2021)
- Other political affiliations: Pakatan Rakyat (PR) (2008–2015); Pakatan Harapan (PH) (2015–2020)
- Education: Universiti Malaya
- Occupation: Politician
- Profession: Dentist

Daroyah binti Alwi is a Malaysian politician who served as Deputy Speaker of the Selangor State Legislative Assembly from March 2019 to June 2020, Member of the Selangor State Executive Council (EXCO) from May 2013 to May 2018 and Member of the Assembly (MLA) for Sementa from May 2013 to August 2023. She is a member of the Parti Bangsa Malaysia (PBM). She was an independent and a member and Deputy Women Chief of the People's Justice Party (PKR), a component party of the Pakatan Harapan (PH) and formerly Pakatan Rakyat (PR) coalitions.

== Politics ==
On 13 June 2020, she left PKR and became an independent in support of the Perikatan Nasional (PN) state opposition coalition. She came out on the grounds that she had "lost confidence in the President of PKR Anwar Ibrahim and his harpist leadership of the idealism of the struggle".

== Election results ==
Selangor State Legislative Assembly
Year	Constituency	Candidate	Votes	Pct	Opponent(s)	Votes	Pct	Ballots cast	Majority	Turnout
2013	N43 Sementa	Daroyah Alwi (PKR)	21,520	60.83%	Md Ghazali Md Amin (UMNO)	13,674	38.65%	35,879	7,846	88.80%
2013	N43 Sementa	Daroyah Alwi (PKR)	21,520	60.83%	Thuraisingam Subbrayan (IND)	182	0.51%	35,879	7,846	88.80%
2018	N43 Sementa	Daroyah Alwi (PKR)	17,868	46.80%	Saroni Judi (UMNO)	12,497	32.73%	38,815	5,370	87.19%
2018	N43 Sementa	Daroyah Alwi (PKR)	17,868	46.80%	Wan Hasrina Wan Hassan (PAS)	7,696	20.16%	38,815	5,370	87.19%
2018	N43 Sementa	Daroyah Alwi (PKR)	17,868	46.80%	Gandhi Nagamuthu (PRM)	12	0.31%	38,815	5,370	87.19%

Parliament of Malaysia
Year	Constituency	Candidate	Votes	Pct	Opponent(s)	Votes	Pct	Ballots cast	Majority	Turnout
2022	P109 Kapar	Daroyah Alwi (PBM)	1,474	0.93%	Halimah Ali (PAS)	65,751	41.61%	158,030	11,782	83.45%
2022	P109 Kapar	Daroyah Alwi (PBM)	1,474	0.93%	Abdullah Sani Abdul Hamid (PKR)	53,969	34.15%	158,030	11,782	83.45%
2022	P109 Kapar	Daroyah Alwi (PBM)	1,474	0.93%	Muhammad Noor Azman (UMNO)	35,079	22.20%	158,030	11,782	83.45%
2022	P109 Kapar	Daroyah Alwi (PBM)	1,474	0.93%	Mohd Pathan Hussin (PEJUANG)	1,015	0.64%	158,030	11,782	83.45%
2022	P109 Kapar	Daroyah Alwi (PBM)	1,474	0.93%	VP Sevelinggam (IND)	477	0.30%	158,030	11,782	83.45%
2022	P109 Kapar	Daroyah Alwi (PBM)	1,474	0.93%	Rahim Awang (WARISAN)	265	0.17%	158,030	11,782	83.45%

== Honours ==
- Selangor
  - Recipient of the Meritorious Service Medal (PJK) (2009)
