= Ahmad Yunus Hairi =

Malaysian politician

Yang Berhormat Dato' Dr. Ahmad Yunus Hairi DPMS MP MLA
- أحمد يونس خيري
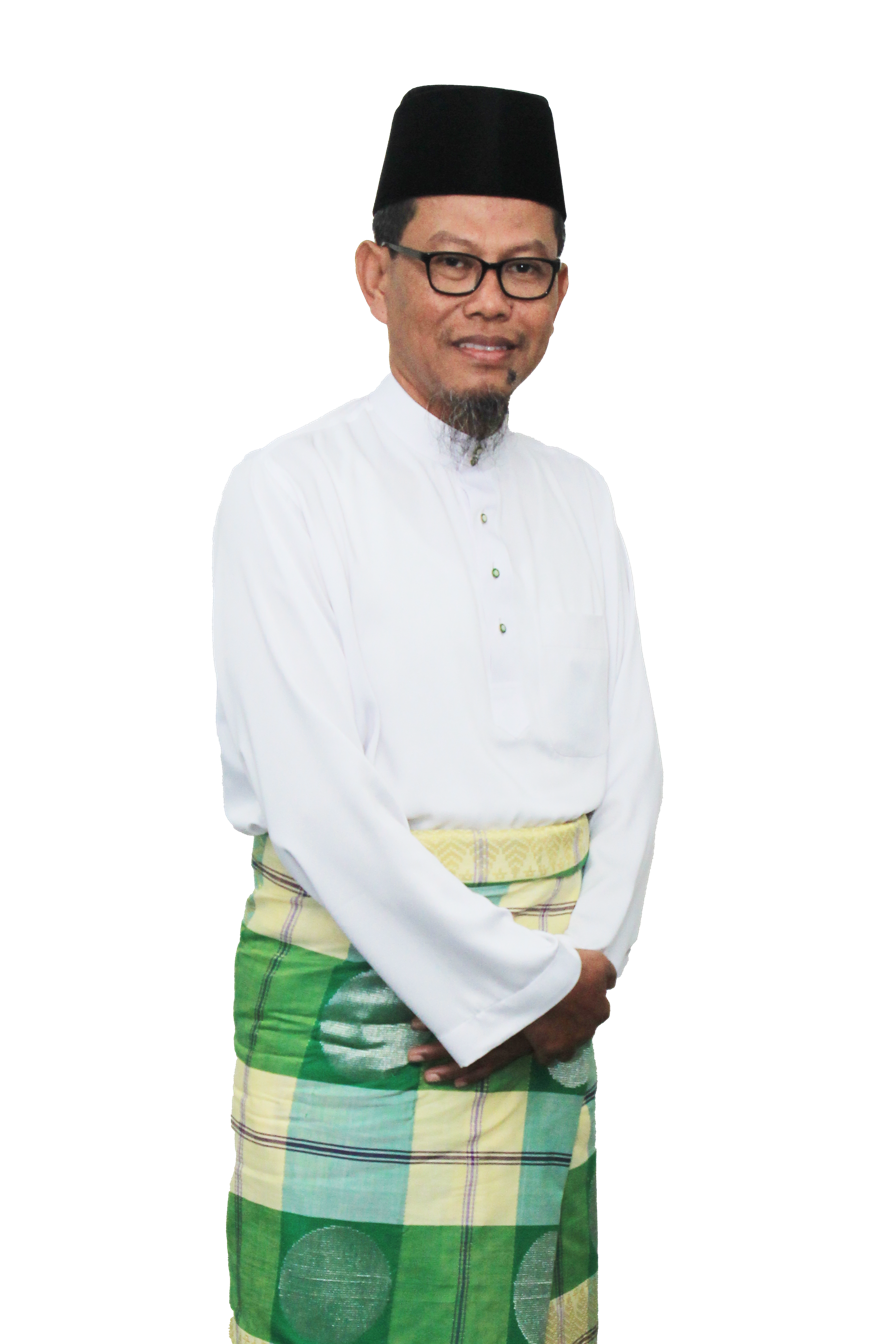

Member of the Selangor State Executive Council
- In office 27 September 2014 – 13 May 2018
- Monarch: Sharafuddin
- Menteri Besar: Mohamed Azmin Ali
- Portfolio: Religious Affairs, Malay Customs, Rural Development and Traditional Villages
- Preceded by: Sallehen Mukhyi (Islamic Affairs); Portfolio established (Malay Customs); Portfolio established (Rural Development); Portfolio established (Traditional Villages)
- Succeeded by: Shaharuddin Badaruddin (Religion); Abdul Rashid Asari (Malay Customs); Amirudin Shari (Rural Development and Tradition Villages)
- Constituency: Sijangkang
- In office 30 May 2013 – 26 September 2014
- Monarch: Sharafuddin
- Menteri Besar: Abdul Khalid Ibrahim
- Portfolio: Youth and Sports, Infrastructure and Public Amenities
- Preceded by: Himself (Youth and Sports); Abdul Khalid Ibrahim (Infrastructure and Public Amenities)
- Succeeded by: Amirudin Shari (Youth Generation Development & Sports); Zaidy Abdul Talib (Infrastructure & Public Facilities)
- Constituency: Sijangkang
- In office 18 February 2012 – 29 May 2013
- Monarch: Sharafuddin
- Menteri Besar: Abdul Khalid Ibrahim
- Portfolio: Malay Customs, Youth and Sports
- Preceded by: Hassan Mohamed Ali (Malay Customs); Khalid Ibrahim (Youth and Sports)
- Succeeded by: Himself (Youth and Sports); Portfolio abolished (Malay Customs)
- Constituency: Sijangkang

15th State Commissioner of the Malaysian Islamic Party of Selangor
- In office 2019 – 31 October 2023
- President: Abdul Hadi Awang
- Succeeded by: Ab Halim Tamuri

Member of the Malaysian Parliament for Kuala Langat
- Incumbent
- Assumed office 19 November 2022
- Preceded by: Xavier Jayakumar Arulanandam (PH–PKR)
- Majority: 1,833 (2022)

Member of the Selangor State Legislative Assembly for Sijangkang
- Incumbent
- Assumed office 8 March 2008
- Preceded by: Abdul Fatah Iskandar (BN–UMNO)
- Majority: 2,081 (2008); 2,942 (2013); 1,677 (2018); 11,308 (2023)

Personal details
- Born: 20 March 1965 (age 61) Selangor, Malaysia
- Citizenship: Malaysian
- Party: Malaysian Islamic Party (PAS)
- Other political affiliations: Perikatan Nasional (PN) (2020–present); Muafakat Nasional (MN); Gagasan Sejahtera (GS) (2018–2020); Pakatan Rakyat (PR) (2008–2015); Barisan Alternatif (BA) (1999–2004); Angkatan Perpaduan Ummah (APU) (1990–1996)
- Education: Universiti Malaya (UM) (MBBS)
- Occupation: Politician
- Profession: Doctor

Ahmad Yunus bin Hairi (born 20 March 1965) is a Malaysian politician and doctor who has served as a Member of Parliament (MP) for Kuala Langat since November 2022 and a Member of the Selangor State Legislative Assembly (MLA) for Sijangkang since March 2008. He served as a Member of the Selangor State Executive Council (EXCO) in the Pakatan Rakyat (PR) and Pakatan Harapan (PH) state administrations under former Menteris Besar Khalid Ibrahim and Azmin Ali from February 2012 to May 2018. He is a member of the Malaysian Islamic Party (PAS), a component party of the Perikatan Nasional (PN) coalition. He also served as the 15th State Commissioner of PAS of Selangor from 2019 to October 2023.

== Election results ==
Selangor State Legislative Assembly
Year	Constituency	Candidate	Votes	Pct	Opponent(s)	Votes	Pct	Ballots cast	Majority	Turnout
2004	N51 Sijangkang	Ahmad Yunus Hairi (PAS)	6,259	39.33%	Abdul Fatah Iskandar (UMNO)	9,655	60.67%	16,735	3,396	78.46%
2008	N51 Sijangkang	Ahmad Yunus Hairi (PAS)	10,049	55.78%	Abdul Fatah Iskandar (UMNO)	7,968	44.22%	18,732	2,081	82.31%
2013	N51 Sijangkang	Ahmad Yunus Hairi (PAS)	14,838	55.50%	Zurihan Yusop (UMNO)	11,896	44.50%	27,216	2,942	89.00%
2018	N51 Sijangkang	Ahmad Yunus Hairi (PAS)	12,688	37.19%	Mohd Hamidi Abu Bakar (BERSATU)	11,011	32.27%	36,645	1,677	92.88%
2018	N51 Sijangkang	Ahmad Yunus Hairi (PAS)	12,688	37.19%	Sulaiman Mohd Karli (UMNO)	10,420	30.54%	36,645	1,677	92.88%
2023	N51 Sijangkang	Ahmad Yunus Hairi (PAS)	30,422	61.41%	Mohd Al-Hafizi Abu Bakar (UMNO)	19,114	38.59%	49,847	11,308	79.24%

Parliament of Malaysia
Year	Constituency	Candidate	Votes	Pct	Opponent(s)	Votes	Pct	Ballots cast	Majority	Turnout
2022	P112 Kuala Langat	Ahmad Yunus Hairi (PAS)	52,867	42.68%	Manivannan Gowindasamy (PKR)	51,034	41.20%	123,860	1,833	83.33%
2022	P112 Kuala Langat	Ahmad Yunus Hairi (PAS)	52,867	42.68%	Mohana Muniandy Raman (MIC)	18,685	15.09%	123,860	1,833	83.33%
2022	P112 Kuala Langat	Ahmad Yunus Hairi (PAS)	52,867	42.68%	Mohd Ridzuan Abdullah (PEJUANG)	591	0.48%	123,860	1,833	83.33%
2022	P112 Kuala Langat	Ahmad Yunus Hairi (PAS)	52,867	42.68%	Zanariah Jumhuri (IND)	512	0.41%	123,860	1,833	83.33%
2022	P112 Kuala Langat	Ahmad Yunus Hairi (PAS)	52,867	42.68%	Gaveson Murugeson (PRM)	171	0.14%	123,860	1,833	83.33%

== Honours ==
=== Honours of Malaysia ===
- Malaysia
  - Recipient of the 17th Yang di-Pertuan Agong Installation Medal (2024)
- Selangor
  - Knight Commander of the Order of the Crown of Selangor (DPMS) – Dato' (2014)
