= Abdullah Sani Abdul Hamid =

Malaysian politician and trade unionist

Yang Berbahagia Dato' Abdullah Sani Abdul Hamid DSPN DSNS DPTJ ANS
- عبدالله ثاني عبدالحميد

Member of the Malaysian Parliament for Kapar
- In office 9 May 2018 – 19 November 2022
- Preceded by: Manivannan Gowindasamy (PR–PKR)
- Succeeded by: Halimah Ali (PN–PAS)
- Majority: 16,306 (2018)

Member of the Malaysian Parliament for Kuala Langat
- In office 8 March 2008 – 9 May 2018
- Preceded by: Shafie Salleh (BN–UMNO)
- Succeeded by: Xavier Jayakumar Arulanandam (PH–PKR)
- Majority: 5,358 (2008); 17,112 (2013)

Personal details
- Born: Abdullah Sani bin Abdul Hamid; 15 February 1962 (age 64) Perak, Federation of Malaya (now Malaysia)
- Party: United Malays National Organisation (UMNO) (–1996); People's Justice Party (PKR) (since 1999)
- Other political affiliations: Barisan Nasional (BN) (–1996); Barisan Alternatif (BA) (1999–2004); Pakatan Rakyat (PR) (2008–2015); Pakatan Harapan (PH) (since 2015)
- Occupation: Politician; trade unionist

Abdullah Sani bin Abdul Hamid (Jawi: عبدالله ثاني بن عبدالحميد; born 15 February 1962) is a Malaysian politician and trade unionist who served as the Member of Parliament (MP) for Kapar from May 2018 to November 2022 and for Kuala Langat from March 2008 to May 2018. He is a member of the People's Justice Party (PKR), a component party of the Pakatan Harapan (PH) and formerly Pakatan Rakyat (PR) and Barisan Alternatif (BA) coalitions. He was also a member of the United Malays National Organisation (UMNO), a component party of the Barisan Nasional (BN) coalition.

Born in Perak, and with a background as a trade unionist, Abdullah Sani was elected to Parliament in the 2008 general election, narrowly winning the seat of Kuala Langat from the ruling Barisan Nasional coalition. He was re-elected in the 2013 general election with an increased margin. In 2013 he also won election as deputy president of the Malaysian Trades Union Congress. He was a prominent player in the 2014 Kajang Move, an internal PKR machination to oust Selangor's Chief Minister, and PKR member, Khalid Ibrahim. He is also a member of the Central Leadership Council of PKR.

In the 2018 general election, Abdullah Sani moved to contested the Kapar parliamentary seat under PKR ticket and won the seat. However, in the 2022 general election, he failed to retain the seat for the second term under PH ticket after being defeated with a huge majority by a female candidate from PN, Halimah Ali who was formerly a state Executive Councilor (EXCO) of Selangor during PR's era as a state government between 2008 and 2014.

== Election results ==
Selangor State Legislative Assembly
Year	Constituency	Candidate	Votes	Pct	Opponent(s)	Votes	Pct	Ballots cast	Majority	Turnout
1999	N20 Pandan	Abdullah Sani Abdul Hamid (keADILan)	12,333	46.19%	Mad Aris Mad Yusof (UMNO)	14,367	53.81%	26,700	2,034	75.36%

Parliament of Malaysia
Year	Constituency	Candidate	Votes	Pct	Opponent(s)	Votes	Pct	Ballots cast	Majority	Turnout
2008	P112 Kuala Langat	Abdullah Sani Abdul Hamid (PKR)	26,687	50.94%	Sulaiman Mohd Karli (UMNO)	25,698	49.06%	52,792	989	79.37%
2013	P112 Kuala Langat	Abdullah Sani Abdul Hamid (PKR)	40,983	53.09%	Sharuddin Omar (UMNO)	35,625	46.15%	78,726	5,358	88.98%
2013	P112 Kuala Langat	Abdullah Sani Abdul Hamid (PKR)	40,983	53.09%	Kottapan Suppaiah (IND)	425	0.55%	78,726	5,358	88.98%
2018	P109 Kapar	Abdullah Sani Abdul Hamid (PKR)	47,731	44.99%	Abd Rani Osman (PAS)	31,425	29.62%	107,829	16,306	86.27%
2018	P109 Kapar	Abdullah Sani Abdul Hamid (PKR)	47,731	44.99%	Mohana Muniandy Raman (MIC)	26,412	24.90%	107,829	16,306	86.27%
2018	P109 Kapar	Abdullah Sani Abdul Hamid (PKR)	47,731	44.99%	Manikavasagam Sundaram (PRM)	525	0.49%	107,829	16,306	86.27%
2022	P109 Kapar	Abdullah Sani Abdul Hamid (PKR)	53,969	34.15%	Halimah Ali (PAS)	65,171	41.61%	158,030	11,872	83.45%
2022	P109 Kapar	Abdullah Sani Abdul Hamid (PKR)	53,969	34.15%	Muhammad Noor Azman (UMNO)	35,079	22.20%	158,030	11,872	83.45%
2022	P109 Kapar	Abdullah Sani Abdul Hamid (PKR)	53,969	34.15%	Daroyah Alwi (PBM)	1,474	0.93%	158,030	11,872	83.45%
2022	P109 Kapar	Abdullah Sani Abdul Hamid (PKR)	53,969	34.15%	Mohd Pathan Hussin (PEJUANG)	1,015	0.64%	158,030	11,872	83.45%
2022	P109 Kapar	Abdullah Sani Abdul Hamid (PKR)	53,969	34.15%	VP Sevelinggam (IND)	477	0.30%	158,030	11,872	83.45%
2022	P109 Kapar	Abdullah Sani Abdul Hamid (PKR)	53,969	34.15%	Rahim Awang (WARISAN)	265	0.17%	158,030	11,872	83.45%

== Honours ==
- Negeri Sembilan
  - Knight Companion of the Order of Loyalty to Negeri Sembilan (DSNS) – Dato' (2005)
  - Knight Commander of the Order of Tuanku Jaafar (DPTJ) – Dato' (2001)
  - Member of the Order of Loyalty to Negeri Sembilan (ANS) (1991)
- Penang
  - Officer of the Order of the Defender of State (DSPN) – Dato' (2016)

== See also ==
- Kuala Langat (federal constituency)
- Kapar (federal constituency)
