= Kuala Langat (federal constituency) =

Federal constituency of Selangor, Malaysia

Kuala Langat (P112)
Selangor constituency

Federal constituency
- Legislature: Dewan Rakyat
- MP: Ahmad Yunus Hairi; PN
- Constituency created: 1958
- First contested: 1959
- Last contested: 2022

Demographics
- Population (2020): 247,093
- Electors (2023): 151,707
- Area (km²): 582
- Pop. density (per km²): 424.6

Kuala Langat is a federal constituency in Kuala Langat District, Selangor, Malaysia, that has been represented in the Dewan Rakyat since 1959.

The federal constituency was created in the 1958 redistribution and is mandated to return a single member to the Dewan Rakyat under the first past the post voting system.

== Demographics ==
Ethnic breakdown of Kuala Langat's electorate as of 2022
1. Malay (55.1%)
2. Chinese (23.6%)
3. Indian (17.2%)
4. Other ethnicities (4.13%)
Age breakdown of Kuala Langat's electorate as of 2022
1. 18-20 (7.79%)
2. 21-29 (23.6%)
3. 30-39 (22.6%)
4. 40-49 (17.8%)
5. 50-59 (13.5%)
6. 60-69 (9.29%)
7. 70-79 (3.95%)
8. 80-89 (1.18%)
9. above 90 (0.25%)
Gender breakdown of Kuala Langat's electorate as of 2022
1. Male (49.8%)
2. Female (50.2%)

== History ==
=== Polling districts ===
According to the federal gazette issued on 18 July 2023, the Kuala Langat constituency is divided into 45 polling districts.

State constituency	Polling Districts	Code	Location
Sijangkang (N51）	Sijangkang Utara	112/51/01	SK Sijangkang
Sijangkang (N51）	Sijangkang Dalam Utara	112/51/02	SRA Sijangkang
Sijangkang (N51）	Sijangkang Dalam Selatan	112/51/03	SK Jalan Tanjung Sijangkang
Sijangkang (N51）	Sijangkang Selatan	112/51/04	SK Kampung Medan
Sijangkang (N51）	Batu 9 Kebun Baharu	112/51/05	SK Kebun Baharu
Sijangkang (N51）	Telok 1	112/51/06	SK Telok Panglima Garang
Sijangkang (N51）	Ladang Carey Barat	112/51/07	SJK (T) Pulau Carey Barat
Sijangkang (N51）	Ladang Carey Selatan	112/51/08	SJK (T) Pulau Carey Selatan
Sijangkang (N51）	Ladang Carey Timur	112/51/09	SJK (T) Ladang Carey Timur
Sijangkang (N51）	Telok 2	112/51/10	SRA Telok Panglima Garang
Sijangkang (N51）	Sungai Bumbun	112/51/11	SK Sungai Bumbun (A) Pulau Carey
Sijangkang (N51）	Batu 10 Kebun Baharu	112/51/12	SRA Kebun Baharu
Sijangkang (N51）	Sijangkang Jaya	112/51/13	SMK Sijangkang Jaya
Sijangkang (N51）	Taman Panglima	112/51/14	SJK (C) Peng Ming
Sijangkang (N51）	Bukit Kemandol	112/51/15	SK Bukit Kemandol
Sijangkang (N51）	Sri Cheeding	112/51/16	SK Sri Cheeding
Sijangkang (N51）	Bukit Cheeding (A)	112/51/17	SK Bukit Cheeding (A)
Sijangkang (N51）	Bandar Saujana Putra	112/51/18	SMK Bandar Saujana Putra
Sijangkang (N51）	Kampung Jenjarom	112/51/19	SK Jenjarom
Banting (N52）	Jenjarom Tempatan Kedua	112/52/01	SJK (C) Jenjarom
Banting (N52）	Jenjarom Tempatan Ketiga	112/52/02	SJK (C) Jenjarom
Banting (N52）	Jenjarom Tempatan Keempat	112/52/03	SJK (C) Jenjarom
Banting (N52）	Kota Sri Langat	112/52/04	SJK (T) Sungai Sedu Banting
Banting (N52）	Sungai Manggis Utara	112/52/05	SMK Sungai Manggis
Banting (N52）	Sungai Manggis Selatan	112/52/06	SJK (T) Sungai Manggis
Banting (N52）	Telok Datok	112/52/07	SMJK Methodist Telok Datok Banting
Banting (N52）	Telok Bunut	112/52/08	SJK (C) Kah Wah Telok Bunut
Banting (N52）	Jenjarom	112/52/09	SJK (T) Jenjarom
Banting (N52）	Jenjarom Tempatan Pertama	112/52/10	SJK (T) Jenjarom
Banting (N52）	Banting Jaya	112/52/11	SK Sri Langat
Banting (N52）	Pulau Banting	112/52/12	Dewan Seberguna Kampung Org. Asli P. Banting
Banting (N52）	Pekan Banting	112/52/13	SJK (C) Choong Hua Banting
Morib (N53）	Sungai Buaya	112/53/01	SK Sungai Buaya
Morib (N53）	Sungai Buaya Tengah	112/53/02	SK Sungai Buaya
Morib (N53）	Bandar	112/53/03	SK Bandar
Morib (N53）	Jugra	112/53/04	SK Permatang Pasir
Morib (N53）	Sungai Raba	112/53/05	SJK (T) Jugra
Morib (N53）	Kanchong	112/53/06	SK Kanchong Darat
Morib (N53）	Kelanang	112/53/07	SK Seri Lanang Banting
Morib (N53）	Kanchong Timur	112/53/08	SMA Unwanus Saadah Kanchong Darat
Morib (N53）	Kanchong Tengah	112/53/09	SK Kanchong Tengah
Morib (N53）	Simpang Morib	112/53/10	SJK (T) Simpang Morib
Morib (N53）	Morib	112/53/11	SK Morib
Morib (N53）	Sri Putra	112/53/12	SRA Banting
Morib (N53）	Taman Kemuning	112/54/13	SMK Bandar Banting

=== Representation history ===
Members of Parliament for Kuala Langat
Parliament	No	Years	Member	Party	Vote Share
Constituency created from Selangor Barat and Langat
Parliament of the Federation of Malaya
1st	P075	1959–1963	Abdul Aziz Ishak (عبدالعزيز اسحاق)	Alliance (UMNO)	9,492; 68.83%
Parliament of Malaysia
1st	P075	1963–1964	Abdul Aziz Ishak (عبدالعزيز اسحاق)	NCP	9,492; 68.83%
2nd	P075	1964–1969	Mohd. Tahir Abdul Majid (محمد. طاهر عبدالمجيد)	Alliance (UMNO)	9,840; 61.95%
		1969–1971	Parliament was suspended		
3rd	P075	1971–1973	Mohd Tahir Abdul Majid (محمد. طاهر عبدالمجيد)	Alliance (UMNO)	10,235; 63.73%
3rd	P075	1973–1974	Mohd Tahir Abdul Majid (محمد. طاهر عبدالمجيد)	BN (UMNO)	10,235; 63.73%
4th	P082	1974–1978	Aishah Ghani (عائشة غاني)	BN (UMNO)	Uncontested
5th	P082	1978–1982	Aishah Ghani (عائشة غاني)	BN (UMNO)	14,405; 66.66%
6th	P082	1982–1986	Aishah Ghani (عائشة غاني)	BN (UMNO)	20,866; 77.29%
7th	P094	1986–1990	Basri Bajuri (بصري باجوري)	BN (UMNO)	22,416; 75.00%
8th	P094	1990–1995	Basri Bajuri (بصري باجوري)	BN (UMNO)	22,607; 61.87%
9th	P101	1995–1999	Shafie Salleh (شافعي صالح)	BN (UMNO)	28,401; 75.55%
10th	P101	1999–2004	Shafie Salleh (شافعي صالح)	BN (UMNO)	24,878; 59.61%
11th	P112	2004–2008	Shafie Salleh (شافعي صالح)	BN (UMNO)	34,118; 72.99%
12th	P112	2008–2013	Abdullah Sani Abdul Hamid (عبدالله ثاني عبدالحميد)	PR (PKR)	26,687; 50.94%
13th	P112	2013–2015	Abdullah Sani Abdul Hamid (عبدالله ثاني عبدالحميد)	PR (PKR)	40,983; 53.20%
13th	P112	2015–2018	Abdullah Sani Abdul Hamid (عبدالله ثاني عبدالحميد)	PH (PKR)	40,983; 53.20%
14th	P112	2018–2021	Xavier Jayakumar Arulanandam (சேவியர் ஜயகுமார் அருலனண்டம்)	PH (PKR)	43,239; 49.08%
14th	P112	2021–2022	Xavier Jayakumar Arulanandam (சேவியர் ஜயகுமார் அருலனண்டம்)	Independent	43,239; 49.08%
14th	P112	2022	Xavier Jayakumar Arulanandam (சேவியர் ஜயகுமார் அருலனண்டம்)	PBM	43,239; 49.08%
15th	P112	2022–present	Ahmad Yunus Hairi (أحمد يونس بن خيري)	PN (PAS)	52,867; 42.68%

=== State constituency ===
Parliamentary constituency	State constituency						
Parliamentary constituency	1955–59*	1959–1974	1974–1986	1986–1995	1995–2004	2004–2018	2018–present
Kuala Langat			Banting				Banting
Kuala Langat		Morib					
Kuala Langat			Panglima Garang				
Kuala Langat					Sijangkang		
Kuala Langat		Telok Datoh					
Kuala Langat					Teluk Datuk		

=== Historical boundaries ===
State Constitiency	Area					
State Constitiency	1959	1974	1984	1994	2003	2018
Banting		Banting; Bukit Changgang; Jenjarom; Kampung Seri Cheeding; Telok Datok	Banting; Bukit Changgang; Kampung Seri Cheeding; Labohan Dagang; Telok Datok			Banting; Jenjarom; Taman Angkasa; Taman Delima; Telok Datok
Morib	Banting; Jugra; Kampung Sungai Buaya; Kanchong; Morib	Jugra; Kampung Kelanang; Kampung Sungai Buaya; Kanchong; Morib			Banting; Jugra; Kampung Sungai Buaya; Kanchong; Morib	Jugra; Kampung Sungai Buaya; Kanchong; Morib; Permatang Pasir
Panglima Garang		Kampung Kebun Baru; Sijangkang; Taman Desa Wira; Taman Rambai Indah; Telok Panglima Garang	Kampung Kebun Baru; Jenjarom; Sijangkang; Taman Desa Wira; Telok Panglima Garang			
Sijangkang				Kampung Kebun Baru; Kampung Seri Cheeding; Pulau Carey; Sijangkang; Telok Panglima Garang	Jenjarom; Kampung Seri Cheeding; Pulau Carey; Sijangkang; Telok Panglima Garang	Bandar Saujana Putra; Kampung Seri Cheeding; Pulau Carey; Sijangkang; Telok Panglima Garang
Teluk Datuk (Note: In 1959, Teluk Datuk as Telok Datoh)	Jenjarom; Labohan Dagang; Sijangkang; Telok Datok; Telok Panglima Garang			Banting; Jenjarom; Kampung Seri Cheeding; Taman Bakti; Telok Datok	Bandar Rimbayu; Bandar Saujana Putra; Kampung Seri Cheeding; Taman Seri Jaromas; Telok Datok	

=== Current state assembly members ===
No.	State Constituency	Member	Coalition (Party)
N51	Sijangkang	Ahmad Yunus Hairi	PN (PAS)
N52	Banting	Papparaidu Veraman	PH (DAP)
N53	Morib	Rosnizan Ahmad	PN (BERSATU)

=== Local governments & postcode ===
No.	State Constituency	Local Government	Postcode
N51	Sijangkang	Kuala Langat Municipal Council	42000 Port Klang; 42500 Telok Panglima Garang; 42600, 42610 Jenjarom; 42700 Banting; 42920 Pulau Indah; 42960 Pulau Carey
N52	Banting	Kuala Langat Municipal Council	42000 Port Klang; 42500 Telok Panglima Garang; 42600, 42610 Jenjarom; 42700 Banting; 42920 Pulau Indah; 42960 Pulau Carey
N53	Morib	Kuala Langat Municipal Council	42000 Port Klang; 42500 Telok Panglima Garang; 42600, 42610 Jenjarom; 42700 Banting; 42920 Pulau Indah; 42960 Pulau Carey

== Election results ==
Malaysian general election, 2022
Party	Candidate	Votes	%	∆%
PN	Ahmad Yunus Hairi	52,867	42.68	▲42.68
PH	Manivannan Gowindasamy	51,034	41.20	▲41.20
BN	Mohana Muniandy Raman	18,685	15.09	▼14.57
PEJUANG	Ridzuan Abdullah	591	0.48	▲0.48
Independent	Zanariah Jumhuri	512	0.41	▲0.41
Parti Rakyat Malaysia	Gaveson Murugeson	171	0.14	▲0.14
Total valid votes		123,860	100.00	
Total rejected ballots		1,436		
Unreturned ballots		153		
Turnout		125,449	83.33	▼4.01
Registered electors		148,637		
Majority		1,833	1.48	▼17.94
PN gain from PKR		Swing		?
Source(s) https://lom.agc.gov.my/ilims/upload/portal/akta/outputp/1753283/PUB612.pdf

Malaysian general election, 2018
Party	Candidate	Votes	%	∆%
PKR	Xavier Jayakumar Arulanandam	43,239	49.08	▼4.12
BN	Shahril Sufian Hamdan	26,127	29.66	▼16.59
PAS	Yahya Baba	18,731	21.26	▲21.26
Total valid votes		88,097	100.00	
Total rejected ballots		1,131		
Unreturned ballots		209		
Turnout		89,437	87.34	▼1.65
Registered electors		102,406		
Majority		17,112	19.42	▲12.47
PKR hold		Swing		
Source(s) "His Majesty's Government Gazette - Notice of Contested Election, Parliament for the State of Selangor [P.U. (B) 239/2018]" (PDF). Attorney General's Chambers of Malaysia. 3 May 2018. Archived from the original (PDF) on 2019-07-19. "Federal Government Gazette - Results of Contested Election and Statements of the Poll after the Official Addition of Votes, Parliamentary Constituencies for the State of Selangor [P.U. (B) 313/2018]" (PDF). Attorney General's Chambers of Malaysia. 28 May 2018. Archived from the original (PDF) on 2019-07-19.

Malaysian general election, 2013
Party	Candidate	Votes	%	∆%
PKR	Abdullah Sani Abdul Hamid	40,983	53.20	▲2.26
BN	Sharuddin Omar	35,625	46.25	▼2.81
Independent	KS Kottapan	426	0.55	▲0.55
Total valid votes		77,034	100.00	
Total rejected ballots		1,523		
Unreturned ballots		169		
Turnout		78,726	88.98	▲7.89
Registered electors		88,474		
Majority		5,358	6.95	▲5.07
PKR hold		Swing		
Source(s) "Federal Government Gazette - Notice of Contested Election, Parliament for the State of Selangor [P.U. (B) 176/2013]" (PDF). Attorney General's Chambers of Malaysia. 26 April 2013. Archived from the original (PDF) on 2018-09-30. "Federal Government Gazette - Results of Contested Election and Statements of the Poll after the Official Addition of Votes, Parliamentary Constituencies for the State of Selangor [P.U. (B) 217/2013]" (PDF). Attorney General's Chambers of Malaysia. 22 May 2013. Archived from the original (PDF) on 2018-09-30.

Malaysian general election, 2008
Party	Candidate	Votes	%	∆%
PKR	Abdullah Sani Abdul Hamid	26,687	50.94	▲23.93
BN	Sulaiman Mohd Karli	25,698	49.06	▼23.93
Total valid votes		52,385	100.00	
Total rejected ballots		1,306		
Unreturned ballots		244		
Turnout		53,935	81.09	▼3.98
Registered electors		66,515		
Majority		989	1.88	▼44.10
PKR gain from BN		Swing		?

Malaysian general election, 2004
Party	Candidate	Votes	%	∆%
BN	Shafie Salleh	34,118	72.99	▲13.38
PKR	Zulkifli Noordin	12,623	27.01	▼13.38
Total valid votes		46,741	100.00	
Total rejected ballots		1,387		
Unreturned ballots		566		
Turnout		48,694	77.11	▲1.73
Registered electors		63,149		
Majority		21,495	45.98	▲26.76
BN hold		Swing		

Malaysian general election, 1999
Party	Candidate	Votes	%	∆%
BN	Shafie Salleh	24,878	59.61	▼15.94
PKR	Saari Sungib	16,858	40.39	▲40.39
Total valid votes		41,736	100.00	
Total rejected ballots		1,318		
Unreturned ballots		242		
Turnout		43,296	75.38	
Registered electors		57,437		
Majority		8,020	19.22	▼31.88
BN hold		Swing		

Malaysian general election, 1995
Party	Candidate	Votes	%	∆%
BN	Shafie Salleh	28,401	75.55	▲13.68
S46	Tarikh Mohd Jonid	9,190	24.45	▼13.68
Total valid votes		37,591	100.00	
Total rejected ballots		1,826		
Unreturned ballots		167		
Turnout		39,584		
Registered electors		53,718		
Majority		19,211	51.10	▲27.36
BN hold		Swing		

Malaysian general election, 1990
Party	Candidate	Votes	%	∆%
BN	Basri Bajuri	22,607	61.87	▼13.13
S46	Sallehuddin Hafiz	13,932	38.13	▲38.13
Total valid votes		36,539	100.00	
Total rejected ballots		1,511		
Unreturned ballots		0		
Turnout		38,050	78.67	▲4.07
Registered electors		48,369		
Majority		8,675	23.74	▼26.26
BN hold		Swing		

Malaysian general election, 1986
Party	Candidate	Votes	%	∆%
BN	Basri Bajuri	22,416	75.00	▼2.29
PAS	Mohsinon Tahir	7,473	25.00	▲2.29
Total valid votes		29,889	100.00	
Total rejected ballots		1,118		
Unreturned ballots		0		
Turnout		31,007	74.60	▼3.58
Registered electors		41,565		
Majority		14,943	50.00	▼4.58
BN hold		Swing		

Malaysian general election, 1982
Party	Candidate	Votes	%	∆%
BN	Aishah Ghani	20,866	77.29	▲10.63
PAS	Mohsinon Tahir	6,131	22.71	▼10.63
Total valid votes		26,997	100.00	
Total rejected ballots		1,322		
Unreturned ballots		0		
Turnout		28,319	78.18	▲0.55
Registered electors		36,225		
Majority		14,735	54.58	▲21.26
BN hold		Swing		

Malaysian general election, 1978
Party	Candidate	Votes	%	∆%
BN	Aishah Ghani	14,405	66.66	▲66.66
PAS	Hassan Ishak	7,205	33.34	▲33.34
Total valid votes		21,610	100.00	
Total rejected ballots		1,118		
Unreturned ballots		0		
Turnout		22,728	77.63	
Registered electors		29,277		
Majority		7,200	33.32	
BN hold		Swing		

Malaysian general election, 1974
Party	Candidate	Votes	%	∆%
On the nomination day, Aishah Ghani won uncontested.
BN	Aishah Ghani			
Total valid votes			100.00	
Total rejected ballots				
Unreturned ballots				
Turnout				
Registered electors		28,026		
Majority				
BN gain from Alliance Party (Malaysia) Party (Malaysia)		Swing		?

Malaysian general election, 1969
Party	Candidate	Votes	%	∆%
Alliance	Mohd. Tahir Abdul Majid	10,235	63.73	▲1.78
PMIP	Ali Saleh	5,824	36.27	▲36.27
Total valid votes		16,059	100.00	
Total rejected ballots		1,848		
Unreturned ballots		0		
Turnout		17,907	71.71	▼8.39
Registered electors		24,973		
Majority		4,411	27.46	▲3.56
Alliance hold		Swing		

Malaysian general election, 1964
Party	Candidate	Votes	%	∆%
Alliance	Mohd. Tahir Abdul Majid	9,840	61.95	▼6.88
Socialist Front	Abdul Aziz Ishak	6,043	38.05	▲38.05
Total valid votes		15,883	100.00	
Total rejected ballots		1,035		
Unreturned ballots		0		
Turnout		16,918	80.16	▼1.50
Registered electors		21,105		
Majority		3,797	23.90	▼13.76
Alliance hold		Swing		

Malayan general election, 1959
Party	Candidate	Votes	%
Alliance	Abdul Aziz Ishak	9,492	68.83
PMIP	Syed Ibrahim Syed Salim	4,299	31.17
Total valid votes		13,791	100.00
Total rejected ballots		230	
Unreturned ballots		0	
Turnout		14,021	81.66
Registered electors		17,169	
Majority		5,193	37.66
This was a new constituency created.
