= Sijangkang (state constituency) =

State constituency in Selangor, Malaysia

Sijangkang (N51)
Selangor constituency

State constituency
- Legislature: Selangor State Legislative Assembly
MLA
Ahmad Yunus Hairi
PN
- Constituency created: 1994
- First contested: 1995
- Last contested: 2023

Demographics
- Electors (2023): 62,907

Sijangkang is a state constituency in Selangor, Malaysia, that has been represented in the Selangor State Legislative Assembly since 1995.

The state constituency was created in the 1994 redistribution and is mandated to return a single member to the Selangor State Legislative Assembly under the first past the post voting system.

== Demographics ==
Ethnic breakdown of Sijangkang's electorate as of 2023
1. Malay (71.2%)
2. Indian (14.3%)
3. Chinese (7.97%)
4. Other ethnicities (6.54%)

== History ==
| State Constitiency | Area | | | | | |
| State Constitiency | 1959 | 1974 | 1984 | 1994 | 2003 | 2018 |
|---|---|---|---|---|---|---|
| Sijangkang | | | | Kampung Kebun Baru; Kampung Seri Cheeding; Pulau Carey; Sijangkang; Telok Panglima Garang | Jenjarom; Kampung Seri Cheeding; Pulau Carey; Sijangkang; Telok Panglima Garang | Bandar Saujana Putra; Kampung Seri Cheeding; Pulau Carey; Sijangkang; Telok Panglima Garang |

2016-2018: The constituency contains the polling districts of Sijangkang Utara, Sijangkang Dalam Utara, Sijangkang Dalam Selatan, Sijangkang Selatan, Batu 9 Kebun Baharu, Telok 1, Jenjarom, Jenjarom Tempatan Pertama, Ladang Carey Barat, Ladang Carey Selatan, Ladang Carey Timur, Telok 2, Sungai Bumbun, Batu 10 Kebun Baharu, Sijangkang Jaya, Taman Panglima

=== Polling districts ===
According to the federal gazette issued on 30 March 2018, the Sijangkang constituency is divided into 19 polling districts.

| State constituency | Polling Districts | Code | Location |
|---|---|---|---|
| Sijangkang (N51） | Sijangkang Utara | 112/51/01 | SK Sijangkang |
| Sijangkang (N51） | Sijangkang Dalam Utara | 112/51/02 | SRA Sijangkang |
| Sijangkang (N51） | Sijangkang Dalam Selatan | 112/51/03 | SK Jalan Tanjung Sijangkang |
| Sijangkang (N51） | Sijangkang Selatan | 112/51/04 | SK Kampung Medan |
| Sijangkang (N51） | Batu 9 Kebun Baharu | 112/51/05 | SK Kebun Baharu |
| Sijangkang (N51） | Telok 1 | 112/51/06 | SK Telok Panglima Garang |
| Sijangkang (N51） | Ladang Carey Barat | 112/51/07 | SJK (T) Pulau Carey Barat |
| Sijangkang (N51） | Ladang Carey Selatan | 112/51/08 | SJK (T) Pulau Carey Selatan |
| Sijangkang (N51） | Ladang Carey Timur | 112/51/09 | SJK (T) Ladang Carey Timur |
| Sijangkang (N51） | Telok 2 | 112/51/10 | SRA Telok Panglima Garang |
| Sijangkang (N51） | Sungai Bumbun | 112/51/11 | SK Sungai Bumbun (A) Pulau Carey |
| Sijangkang (N51） | Batu 10 Kebun Baharu | 112/51/12 | SRA Kebun Baharu |
| Sijangkang (N51） | Sijangkang Jaya | 112/51/13 | SMK Sijangkang Jaya |
| Sijangkang (N51） | Taman Panglima | 112/51/14 | SJK (C) Peng Ming |
| Sijangkang (N51） | Bukit Kemandol | 112/51/15 | SK Bukit Kemandol |
| Sijangkang (N51） | Sri Cheeding | 112/51/16 | SK Seri Cheeding |
| Sijangkang (N51） | Bukit Cheeding (A) | 112/51/17 | SK Bukit Cheeding (A) |
| Sijangkang (N51） | Bandar Saujana Putra | 112/51/18 | Dewan Seberguna Rumah Pangsa Seri Saujana |
| Sijangkang (N51） | Kampung Jenjarom | 112/51/19 | SK Jenjarom |

=== Representation history ===
Members of the Legislative Assembly for Sijangkang
| Assembly | No | Years | Member | Party |
Constituency renamed from Panglima Garang and Pandamaran
| 9th | N43 | 1995-1999 | Abdul Fatah Iskandar | BN (UMNO) |
| 10th | N43 | 1999–2004 | Abdul Fatah Iskandar | BN (UMNO) |
| 11th | N51 | 2004–2008 | Abdul Fatah Iskandar | BN (UMNO) |
| 12th | N51 | 2008-2013 | Ahmad Yunus Hairi | PR (PAS) |
| 13th | N51 | 2013–2018 | Ahmad Yunus Hairi | PR (PAS) |
| 14th | N51 | 2018-2020 | Ahmad Yunus Hairi | GS (PAS) |
| 14th | N51 | 2020-2023 | Ahmad Yunus Hairi | PN (PAS) |
| 15th | N51 | 2023–present | Ahmad Yunus Hairi | PN (PAS) |

== Election results ==
Selangor state election, 2023
| Party | Candidate | Votes | % | ∆% |
|---|---|---|---|---|
| PN | Ahmad Yunus Hairi | 30,422 | 61.41 | ▲61.41 |
| BN | Mohd Al-Hafizi Abu Bakar | 19,114 | 38.59 | ▲8.05 |
| Total valid votes | | 49,536 | 100.00 | |
| Total rejected ballots | | 311 | | |
| Unreturned ballots | | 43 | | |
| Turnout | | 49,890 | 79.31 | ▼13.56 |
| Registered electors | | 62,907 | | |
| Majority | | 11,308 | 22.82 | ▲17.90 |
| PN hold | | Swing | | |

Selangor state election, 2018
| Party | Candidate | Votes | % | ∆% |
|---|---|---|---|---|
| PAS | Ahmad Yunus Hairi | 12,688 | 37.19 | ▼18.31 |
| PKR | Mohd Hamidi Abu Bakar | 11,011 | 32.27 | ▲32.27 |
| BN | Sulaiman Mohd Karli | 10,420 | 30.54 | ▼13.96 |
| Total valid votes | | 34,119 | 100.00 | |
| Total rejected ballots | | 458 | | |
| Unreturned ballots | | 2,068 | | |
| Turnout | | 36,645 | 92.88 | ▲3.88 |
| Registered electors | | 39,455 | | |
| Majority | | 1,677 | 4.92 | ▼6.08 |
| PAS hold | | Swing | | |

Selangor state election, 2013
| Party | Candidate | Votes | % | ∆% |
|---|---|---|---|---|
| PAS | Ahmad Yunus Hairi | 14,838 | 55.50 | ▼0.28 |
| BN | Zurihan Yusop | 11,896 | 44.50 | ▲0.28 |
| Total valid votes | | 26,734 | 100.00 | |
| Total rejected ballots | | 417 | | |
| Unreturned ballots | | 65 | | |
| Turnout | | 27,216 | 89.00 | ▲6.69 |
| Registered electors | | 30,581 | | |
| Majority | | 2,942 | 11.00 | ▼0.56 |
| PAS hold | | Swing | | |
Source(s) "Federal Government Gazette - Notice of Contested Election, State Legislative Assembly for the State of Selangor [P.U. (B) 192/2013]" (PDF). Attorney General's Chambers of Malaysia. 26 April 2013. "Federal Government Gazette - Results of Contested Election and Statements of the Poll after the Official Addition of Votes, State Constituencies for the State of Selangor [P.U. (B) 233/2013]" (PDF). Attorney General's Chambers of Malaysia. 22 May 2013.

Selangor state election, 2008
| Party | Candidate | Votes | % | ∆% |
|---|---|---|---|---|
| PAS | Ahmad Yunus Hairi | 10,049 | 55.78 | ▲16.45 |
| BN | Abdul Fatah Iskandar | 7,968 | 44.22 | ▼16.45 |
| Total valid votes | | 18,017 | 100.00 | |
| Total rejected ballots | | 374 | | |
| Unreturned ballots | | 341 | | |
| Turnout | | 18,732 | 82.31 | ▲3.85 |
| Registered electors | | 22,759 | | |
| Majority | | 2,081 | 11.56 | ▼9.78 |
| PAS gain from BN | | Swing | | ? |

Selangor state election, 2004
| Party | Candidate | Votes | % | ∆% |
|---|---|---|---|---|
| BN | Abdul Fatah Iskandar | 9,655 | 60.67 | ▲8.93 |
| PAS | Ahmad Yunus Hairi | 6,259 | 39.33 | ▼8.93 |
| Total valid votes | | 15,914 | 100.00 | |
| Total rejected ballots | | 360 | | |
| Unreturned ballots | | 461 | | |
| Turnout | | 16,735 | 78.46 | ▲4.74 |
| Registered electors | | 21,329 | | |
| Majority | | 3,396 | 21.34 | ▲17.86 |
| BN hold | | Swing | | |

Selangor state election, 1999
| Party | Candidate | Votes | % | ∆% |
|---|---|---|---|---|
| BN | Abdul Fatah Iskandar | 6,948 | 51.74 | ▼23.24 |
| PAS | Mohammad Sallehuddin Hafiz | 6,480 | 48.26 | ▲23.24 |
| Total valid votes | | 13,428 | 100.00 | |
| Total rejected ballots | | 466 | | |
| Unreturned ballots | | 9 | | |
| Turnout | | 13,903 | 73.72 | ▲4.47 |
| Registered electors | | 18,860 | | |
| Majority | | 468 | 3.48 | ▼46.48 |
| BN hold | | Swing | | |

Selangor state election, 1995
| Party | Candidate | Votes | % |
|---|---|---|---|
| BN | Abdul Fatah Iskandar | 9,233 | 74.98 |
| PAS | Mohammad Sallehuddin Hafiz | 3,081 | 25.02 |
| Total valid votes | | 12,314 | 100.00 |
| Total rejected ballots | | 430 | |
| Unreturned ballots | | 3 | |
| Turnout | | 12,747 | 69.25 |
| Registered electors | | 18,407 | |
| Majority | | 6,152 | 49.96 |
This was a new constituency created.
