= Leelavathi Govindasamy =

Malaysian-Indian politician (1944–2017)

Yang Berbahagia Datuk Dr. Leelavathi Govindasamy PJN PMW AMN
- லீலாவதி கோவிந்தசாமி
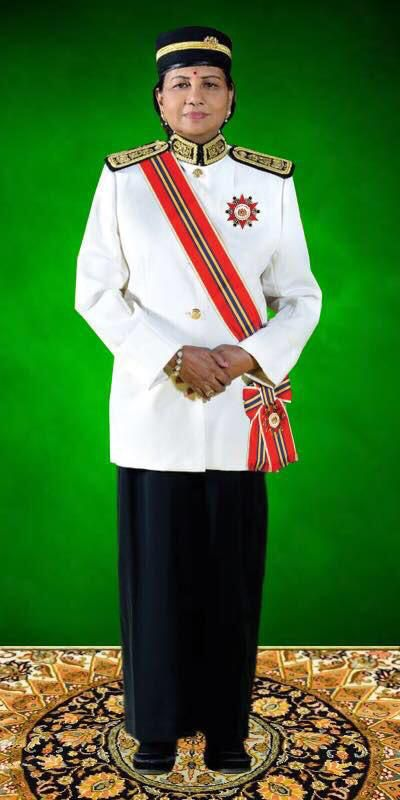
- Leelavathi receiving her datukship

Member of the Malaysian Parliament for Kapar, Selangor
- In office 1995–1999
- Preceded by: M. Mahalingam (MIC-BN)
- Succeeded by: Komala Devi M Perumal (MIC-BN)
- Majority: 18,759 votes

Personal details
- Born: 6 August 1944
- Died: 9 March 2017 (aged 72)
- Citizenship: Malaysian
- Party: Malaysian Indian Congress
- Spouse: Ramasamy Muniandy
- Children: 2
- Education: Methodist Girls' School, Brickfields, Malaysia and Queen Mary's College Coimbatore, India
- Alma mater: Coimbatore Medical College
- Occupation: Doctor and politician

Datuk Leelavathi Govindasamy (Tamil: லீலாவதி கோவிந்தசாமி) (6 August 1944 – 9 March 2017), commonly known as Datuk G. Leela Rama, was a Malaysian politician. She held her last position in the Malaysian Government as the Member of Parliament, Malaysia for the Kapar constituency in Selangor from 1995 to 1999, from the Malaysian Indian Congress (MIC), a component party of the Barisan Nasional (BN) coalition. She was the First Malaysian Indian Lady to be elected to Parliament of Malaysia. In the 9th General Elections, she won by majority of 18,759 votes.

== Background ==
Datuk G. Leelavathi was born in Selangor in 1944 during the Japanese Occupation in Malaya. She was second in the family of six children. Her father, Govindasamy Kuppusamy, hailed from the South Indian village of Thiruvallur in the District of Tanjore and came to Malaya as a very young man. He received his education in Anglo Chinese School in Bukit Rotan in 1941 and School of Commerce in 1947. He worked as a teacher from 1927 and later became a Chief Police Clerk and an Interpreter and served the Malaysian Police Force for 26 years. He married Madam Kuppamal Rengasamy from Port Dickson on 18 September 1939. Govindasamy Kuppusamy played an important role in the education of many well known Malaysian Indian politicians. In the year 1972, the Indian government announced on the Malaysian newspapers to rename a 17,000 tonne shipping vessel MV Pasteur, built in Dunkerque, France, for Messageries Maritimes’ South American services which was bought by the government-owned Shipping Corporation of India. Govindasamy then had the opportunity to renamed the shipping vessel, Chidambaram an eponym in honour of Tamil Nadu shipping pioneer V.O. Chidambaram Pillai. It was indeed a great achievement in Govindasamy’s career. An ocean liner, that served its glorious 13 years in the Straits Service between Madras (now known as Chennai), Penang, Port Klang and Singapore till 12 Feb 1985. Datuk G. Leelavathi's siblings are G. Manonmoney, G. Jayapalan (Deceased), G. Yusuf Siddiq Jegathesan (Klinik Ringlet, Cameron Highlands), K.G. Jenarthanan, G. Sivakumaran (Deceased) and G. Malathi. Datuk G. Leelavathi received her early education at Methodist Girls School, Brickfields, Kuala Lumpur. She was an intelligent student who continued her tertiary education at Queen Mary's College, Madras for Bachelor of Science, Zoology. She graduated in the field of Medicine in September 1974 from Coimbatore Medical College, India, affiliated with Madras Medical University. She married Ramasamy Muniandy on 11 November 1978 who is also active in politics as a Branch Chairman of Pandan under the MIC (Malaysian Indian Congress). Leelavathi has two children, Sharmila Ramasamy and Preeveen Ram Ramasamy and son in law Ganesh Gerald Muthu who succeeded as chairman for her Jalan Mahkota Branch, under MIC and daughter in law Kuknesvary Puniamurthy. She has 3 grandchildren Keeva Shreenika, Ravvesh Ganesh Gerald and Ravvesha Leela Ganesh Gerald.

Datuk G. Leelavathi started working in Kuala Lumpur General Hospital as a Medical Officer on 30 December 1975 and later founded Klinik Leela, Taman Maluri, Cheras in 1983, currently succeeded by daughter Sharmila Ramasamy from March 2017. She was actively involved in the field of Aesthetic Medicine under International Academy of Anti Aging and Aesthetic Medicine, USA and Nutritional Medicine under Society for Anti Aging Aesthetic and Regenerative Medicine Malaysia (SAAARMM). Datuk G. Leelavathi was awarded a fellowship by SAAARMM in the year 2015 and it was presented by Sultan Muhammad V, Sultan of Kelantan.

== Political career ==
- MIC Branch Women Leader, MIC Brickfields Bangsar Branch
- MIC Branch Chairman, MIC Jalan Mahkota Branch, W.P from 1987 to 2017 (Succeeded by Ganesh Gerald Muthu- Son in Law)
- MIC Divisional Women Leader, Titiwangsa Division, Wilayah Persekutuan
- MIC State Women Leader, Wilayah Persekutuan from 1987 to 1999
- MIC Central Working Committee (CWC) Member from 1994 to 1999
- MIC National Deputy Women Leader from 1994 to 1999
- Member of Parliament Kapar from 1995 to 1999
- Member of PAC Parliament Malaysia from 1995 to 1999
- Exco Member of National Council of Ex-Parliamentarians, (MUBARAK - Majlis Bekas Ahli-Ahli Parlimen Malaysia)
- 1992 – 2017 Exco Member and Health Chairman, Kor Wanita Kota
- 1985 - 2011 Member, Board of Governors, Tengku Budriah Orphanage Home, Kuala Lumpur
- 1985 – 2011 Exco-Member and Health Chairman, Women Section, PEMADAM
- 1986 – 1990 Treasurer, Malaysian Professional Society
- Assistant Treasurer, National Association of Women Entrepreneurs of Malaysia (NAWEM)

== Contributions ==
- First National Rubella Injection Introduction Campaign on 18 June 1988
- Appeared in 200 Years of Malaysian Indians Documentary, Malaysia Indian women in political and social work.

== Election results ==
Parliament of Malaysia
Year	Constituency	Candidate	Votes	Pct	Opponent(s)	Votes	Pct	Ballots cast	Majority	Turnout
1995	P099 Kapar	Leelavathi Govindasamy (MIC)	33,283	69.62%	Sanad Said (S46)	14,524	30.38%	49,595	18,759	73.41%

== Honours ==
=== Honours of Malaysia ===
- Malaysia
  - Member of the Order of the Defender of the Realm (AMN) (1992)
  - Commander of the Order of Meritorious Service (PJN) – Datuk (2016)
- Federal Territory (Malaysia)
  - Commander of the Order of the Territorial Crown (PMW) – Datuk (2016)

=== Honours of India ===
- India
  - Pravasi Bharatiya Samman Award- (Overseas Indian Honour- 2007)

=== Honours of Society ===
==== Malaysia ====
- Fellowship Society of Anti Aging, Aesthetic Regenerative Medicine Malaysia (SAAARMM) 2015- Carries a title of FSAAARMM

==== India ====
- Fellowship Indian Nutritional Medical Association (INMA) 2016 -Carries a title of FINEM

== Death ==
Datuk G. Leelavathi died on 9 March 2017, at the age of 72. Reactions to the news of her death ranged from tributes around Malaysia and India. Her funeral was attended by Ministers in Malaysia. Her body was cremated at Cheras, Kuari Crematorium on 10 March 2017.
