= Pelabohan Kelang (federal constituency) =

Selangor constituency

Defunct federal constituency
- Legislature: Dewan Rakyat
- Constituency created: 1974
- Constituency abolished: 1986
- First contested: 1974
- Last contested: 1982

Pelabohan Kelang was a federal constituency in Selangor, Malaysia, that was represented in the Dewan Rakyat from 1974 to 1986.

The federal constituency was created in the 1974 redistribution and was mandated to return a single member to the Dewan Rakyat under the first past the post voting system.

== History ==
It was abolished in 1986 when it was redistributed.

=== Representation history ===
Members of Parliament for Pelabohan Kelang
Parliament	No	Years	Member	Party	Vote Share
Constituency created from Kapar and Klang
4th	P079	1974-1978	V. Manickavasagam (வி. மாணிக்கவாசகம்)	BN (MIC)	16,277; 67.25%
5th	P079	1978-1979	V. Manickavasagam (வி. மாணிக்கவாசகம்)	BN (MIC)	21,429; 64.59%
5th	P079	1979-1982	V. Govindaraj (வி. கோவிந்தராஜ்)	BN (MIC)	17,219; 52.52%
6th	P079	1982-1986	V. Govindaraj (வி. கோவிந்தராஜ்)	BN (MIC)	25,026; 54.94%
Constituency abolished, split into Shah Alam, Kapar and Klang

=== State constituency ===
Parliamentary constituency	State constituency						
Parliamentary constituency	1955–59*	1959–1974	1974–1986	1986–1995	1995–2004	2004–2018	2018–present
Pelabohan Kelang			Kapar				
Pelabohan Kelang			Selat Kelang				
Pelabohan Kelang			Sementa				

=== Historical boundaries ===
State Constituency	Area
State Constituency	1974
Kapar	Bukit Cherakah; Bukit Kerayong; Kampung Perepat; Kapar; Meru
Selat Kelang	Pandamaran; Pelabohan Kelang; Pulau Carey; Telok Kong; Telok Pulai
Sementa	Bandar Sultan Sulaiman; Bukit Raja; Kampung Rantau Panjang; Kampung Tanjung Syawal; Sementa

== Election results ==
Malaysian general election, 1982
Party	Candidate	Votes	%	∆%
BN	V. Govindaraj	25,026	54.94	▼2.42
DAP	Nadarasa @ Nadarajah Muthu Thamby	13,142	28.85	▲5.13
PAS	Abdullah Hashim	7,385	16.21	▼6.74
Total valid votes		45,553	100.00	
Total rejected ballots		1,212		
Unreturned ballots		0		
Turnout		46,765	76.52	
Registered electors		61,113		
Majority		11,884	26.09	▼2.71
BN hold		Swing		

Malaysian general by-election, 1 December 1979 Upon the death of incumbent, V. Manickavasagam
Party	Candidate	Votes	%	∆%
BN	V. Govindaraj	17,219	52.52	▼12.07
DAP	K. Ramasen	7,777	23.72	▼7.41
PAS	Ahmad Subki Abd. Latif @ Subky Abd. Latif	7,525	22.95	▲18.67
Independent	Abdul Hanif Abdul Manaf	114	0.35	▲0.35
Independent	Mani Nagaindra Valliappan	83	0.25	▲0.25
Independent	Mohan Lal	43	0.13	▲0.13
Independent	Hari Devan Mookhen	22	0.07	▲0.07
Total valid votes		32,783	100.00	
Total rejected ballots		528		
Unreturned ballots		0		
Turnout		33,311		
Registered electors				
Majority		9,442	28.80	▼4.66
BN hold		Swing		

Malaysian general election, 1978
Party	Candidate	Votes	%	∆%
BN	V. Manickavasagam	21,429	64.59	▼2.66
DAP	K. Ramasen	10,329	31.13	▲21.79
PAS	Mohd Zin Ibrahim	1,420	4.28	▲4.28
Total valid votes		33,178	100.00	
Total rejected ballots		1,242		
Unreturned ballots		0		
Turnout		37,935	75.90	▼0.21
Registered electors		49,979		
Majority		11,100	33.46	▼10.37
BN hold		Swing		

Malaysian general election, 1974
Party	Candidate	Votes	%
BN	V. Manickavasagam	16,277	67.25
PEKEMAS	A. V. Kathiah	5,669	23.42
DAP	Abdul Aziz Ismail	2,260	9.34
Total valid votes		24,202	100.00
Total rejected ballots		1,261	
Unreturned ballots		4	
Turnout		25,467	76.11
Registered electors		33,459	
Majority		10,608	43.83
This was a new constituency created.
