= Manivannan Gowindasamy =

Malaysian politician

- மணிவண்ணன் கோவிந்தசாமி

Deputy Chairman of the National Institute of Occupational Safety and Health
- Incumbent
- Assumed office 19 February 2024
- Minister: Steven Sim Chee Keong
- Preceded by: Wilson Ugak Kumbong

Political Secretary of the Office of the President of the People's Justice Party
- Incumbent
- Assumed office 8 April 2024 Serving with Onn Abu Bakar & Sim Tze Tzin & Juwairiya Zulkifli
- President: Anwar Ibrahim
- Senior Political Secretary and Coordinator: Romli Ishak
- Preceded by: Position established

Member of the Malaysian Parliament for Kapar
- In office 5 May 2013 – 9 May 2018
- Preceded by: Manikavasagam Sundram (PR–PKR)
- Succeeded by: Abdullah Sani Abdul Hamid (PH–PKR)
- Majority: 23,790 (2013)

Personal details
- Born: Manivannan s/o Gowindasamy; 1976 (age 49–50) Malaysia
- Citizenship: Malaysian
- Party: People's Justice Party (PKR)
- Other political affiliations: Pakatan Rakyat (PR) (2008–2015); Pakatan Harapan (PH) (since 2015)
- Occupation: Politician

Manivannan s/o Gowindasamy (Tamil: கோ. மணிவண்ணன், romanized: Ko. Maṇivaṇṇaṉ; born 1976) is a Malaysian politician who has served as Deputy Chairman of the National Institute of Occupational Safety and Health (NIOSH) since February 2024 and Political Secretary of the Office of the President of the People's Justice Party (PKR) since April 2024. He served as the Member of Parliament (MP) for Kapar from May 2013 to May 2018. He is a member of PKR, a component party in the Pakatan Harapan (PH) and formerly Pakatan Rakyat (PR) coalitions.

On 28 Nov 2017 Manivannan resigned as PKR's secretary whip after his error on the omission of an opposition vote during a tabulation of bloc vote on Budget 2018 he called in the parliament earlier.

In the 2018 election, Manivannan contested as PKR candidate in the Perak State Legislative Assembly constituency of Hutan Melintang instead but lost to the Barisan Nasional (BN) candidate in a three corner fight with Pan-Malaysian Islamic Party (PAS) candidate.

== Election results ==
Parliament of Malaysia
Year	Constituency	Candidate	Votes	Pct	Opponent(s)	Votes	Pct	Ballots cast	Majority	Turnout
2013	P109 Kapar	Manivannan Gowindasamy (PKR)	69,849	56.17%	Sakthivel Alagappan (MIC)	46,059	37.05%	127,023	23,790	88.11%
2013	P109 Kapar	Manivannan Gowindasamy (PKR)	69,849	56.17%	Mohd Pathan Hussin (BERJASA)	6,289	5.06%	127,023	23,790	88.11%
2013	P109 Kapar	Manivannan Gowindasamy (PKR)	69,849	56.17%	Norhamzah Suratman (IND)	1,067	0.86%	127,023	23,790	88.11%
2013	P109 Kapar	Manivannan Gowindasamy (PKR)	69,849	56.17%	Mohd Nazri Abdul Aziz (IND)	835	0.67%	127,023	23,790	88.11%
2013	P109 Kapar	Manivannan Gowindasamy (PKR)	69,849	56.17%	Palaya Rengaiah (IND)	231	0.19%	127,023	23,790	88.11%
2022	P112 Kuala Langat	Manivannan Gowindasamy (PKR)	51,034	41.20%	Ahmad Yunus Hairi (PAS)	52,867	42.68%	123,860	1,833	83.33%
2022	P112 Kuala Langat	Manivannan Gowindasamy (PKR)	51,034	41.20%	Mohana Muniandy Raman (MIC)	18,685	15.09%	123,860	1,833	83.33%
2022	P112 Kuala Langat	Manivannan Gowindasamy (PKR)	51,034	41.20%	Mohd Ridzuan Abdullah (PEJUANG)	591	0.48%	123,860	1,833	83.33%
2022	P112 Kuala Langat	Manivannan Gowindasamy (PKR)	51,034	41.20%	Zanariah Jumhuri (IND)	512	0.41%	123,860	1,833	83.33%
2022	P112 Kuala Langat	Manivannan Gowindasamy (PKR)	51,034	41.20%	Gaveson Murugeson (PRM)	171	0.14%	123,860	1,833	83.33%

Perak State Legislative Assembly
Year	Constituency	Candidate	Votes	Pct	Opponent(s)	Votes	Pct	Ballots cast	Majority	Turnout
2018	N54 Hutan Melintang	Manivannan Gowindasamy (PKR)	10,220	41.79%	Khairuddin Tarmizi (UMNO)	10,961	44.82%	25,048	741	80.20%
2018	N54 Hutan Melintang	Manivannan Gowindasamy (PKR)	10,220	41.79%	Mohd Misbahul Munir Masduki (PAS)	3,150	12.88%	25,048	741	80.20%

Negeri Sembilan State Legislative Assembly
Year	Constituency	Candidate	Votes	Pct	Opponent(s)	Votes	Pct	Ballots cast	Majority	Turnout
2026	N07 Jeram Padang	Manivannan Gowindasamy (PKR)	2,372	20.46%	Mohd Zaidy Abdul Kadir (UMNO)	6,854	59.11%	11,869	4,482	71.54%
2026	N07 Jeram Padang	Manivannan Gowindasamy (PKR)	2,372	20.46%	Sri Sanjeevan Ramakrishnan (BERSATU)	2,191	18.89%	11,869	4,482	71.54%
2026	N07 Jeram Padang	Manivannan Gowindasamy (PKR)	2,372	20.46%	Dayana Dal (ASLI)	179	1.54%	11,869	4,482	71.54%

== See also ==
- Kapar (federal constituency)
- Hutan Melintang (state constituency)
- Jeram Padang (state constituency)
