= Manikavasagam Sundaram =

Malaysian politician

- மாணிக்கவாசகம் சுந்தரம்

Vice President of the Parti Rakyat Malaysia
- Incumbent
- Assumed office 2 March 2024 Serving with Tan Chow Kang & Sarah Afiqah Zainol Ariff
- President: Rohana Ariffin

Member of the Malaysian Parliament for Kapar
- In office 8 March 2008 – 5 May 2013
- Preceded by: Komala Devi M Perumal (BN–MIC)
- Succeeded by: Manivannan Gowindasamy (PR–PKR)
- Majority: 12,297 (2008)

Personal details
- Born: Manikavasagam s/o Sundram; 27 June 1965 (age 60) Selangor, Malaysia
- Party: Parti Rakyat Malaysia (PRM) (1999–2000, since 2018); People's Justice Party (PKR) (2000–2018)
- Other political affiliations: Barisan Alternatif (BA) (1999–2004); Pakatan Rakyat (PR) (2008–2015); Pakatan Harapan (PH) (2015–2018)
- Occupation: Politician; social activist

Manikavasagam s/o Sundaram (Tamil: சு. மாணிக்கவாசகம்) (born 27 June 1965) is a Malaysian politician and social activist who served as the Member of Parliament (MP) for Kapar from March 2008 to May 2013. He is a member of the Parti Rakyat Malaysia (PRM), a component party of formerly Barisan Alternatif (BA) coalition and was a member of the People's Justice Party (PKR), a component party of the Pakatan Harapan (PH) and formerly Pakatan Rakyat (PR) and BA coalitions. He has served as the vice president of PRM since March 2024.

== Political career ==
Manikavasagam was elected to Parliament in the 2008 election, winning the seat of Kapar, previously held by the Barisan Nasional (BN) coalition. Before his election, Manikavasagam was a prominent leader in the Hindu Rights Action Force (HINDRAF).

In December 2008, Manikavasagam announced he would leave PKR, citing disappointment with the party's leadership in Selangor. He eventually resigned from a leadership position within PKR, but not from the party itself.

In June 2009, an arrest warrant was issued for Manikavasagam after he allegedly refused to respond to a subpoena to testify at an inquest into the death of an actress. Manikavasagam applied to have the warrant set aside, and eventually testified at the inquest. Less than two weeks later, he was arrested over an unrelated public demonstration.

PKR did not renominate Manikavasagam to defend his Kapar parliamentary seat in the 2013 election. He contested the Selangor State Legislative Assembly seat of Bukit Melawati instead, losing to a United Malays National Organisation (UMNO) candidate. In 2014 he was suspended from PKR for making allegations of "money politics" against the Selangor Chief Minister Khalid Ibrahim. After the lifting of his suspension, he challenged Khalid for the leadership for the Selangor division of PKR, and won, part of a series of events culminating in Khalid's downfall as Chief Minister later in the year.

On 7 April 2018, he announced that he has rejoined Parti Rakyat Malaysia (PRM), a party which he first joined in 1999 before leaving for PKR in 2000. He also contested for the Kapar parliamentary seat and Meru state seat in the 2018 election under PRM ticket but lost both.

== Election results ==
Selangor State Legislative Assembly
Year	Constituency	Candidate	Votes	Pct	Opponent(s)	Votes	Pct	Ballots cast	Majority	Turnout
2013	N10 Bukit Melawati	Manikavasagam Sundaram (PKR)	6,490	45.99%	Jakiran Jacomah (UMNO)	7,296	51.70%	14,113	806	87.60%
2018	N42 Meru	Manikavasagam Sundaram (PRM)	346	1.02%	Mohd Fakhrulrazi Mohd Mokhtar (AMANAH)	17,665	52.04%	34,448	9,608	88.12%
2018	N42 Meru	Manikavasagam Sundaram (PRM)	346	1.02%	Khairul Anuar Saimun (UMNO)	8,057	23.74%	34,448	9,608	88.12%
2018	N42 Meru	Manikavasagam Sundaram (PRM)	346	1.02%	Noor Najhan Mohd Salleh (PAS)	7,804	22.99%	34,448	9,608	88.12%
2018	N42 Meru	Manikavasagam Sundaram (PRM)	346	1.02%	Shee Chee Weng (IND)	72	0.21%	34,448	9,608	88.12%

Parliament of Malaysia
Year	Constituency	Candidate	Votes	Pct	Opponent(s)	Votes	Pct	Ballots cast	Majority	Turnout
2008	P109 Kapar	Manikavasagam Sundaram (PKR)	48,196	57.31%	Komala Devi M Perumal (MIC)	35,899	42.69%	87,286	12,297	77.78%
2018	P109 Kapar	Manikavasagam Sundaram (PRM)	525	0.49%	Abdullah Sani Abdul Hamid (PKR)	47,731	44.99%	107,829	16,306	86.27%
2018	P109 Kapar	Manikavasagam Sundaram (PRM)	525	0.49%	Abd Rani Osman (PAS)	31,425	29.62%	107,829	16,306	86.27%
2018	P109 Kapar	Manikavasagam Sundaram (PRM)	525	0.49%	Mohana Muniandy Raman (MIC)	26,412	24.90%	107,829	16,306	86.27%
