= Noor Najhan Mohamad Salleh =

Malaysian politician

Yang Berhormat Tuan Noor Najhan Mohamad Salleh MLA
- نور نجحان محمد صالح

Member of the Selangor State Legislative Assembly for Sementa
- Incumbent
- Assumed office 12 August 2023
- Preceded by: Daroyah Alwi (PH–PKR)
- Majority: 10,039 (2023)

Personal details
- Born: Noor Najhan bin Mohamad Salleh Malaysia
- Citizenship: Malaysian
- Party: Malaysian Islamic Party (PAS)
- Other political affiliations: Perikatan Nasional (PN)
- Occupation: Politician

Noor Najhan bin Mohamad Salleh is a Malaysian politician who has served as Member of the Selangor State Legislative Assembly (MLA) for Sementa since August 2023. He is a member and Division Chief of Kapar of the Malaysian Islamic Party (PAS), a component party of the Perikatan Nasional (PN) coalition.

== Political career ==
In the 2023 Selangor state election, Noor Najhan made his electoral debut after being nominated by PN to contest the Sementa state seat. Noor Najhan won the seat and was elected to the Selangor State Legislative Assembly as the Sementa MLA for the first term after defeating Erni Afrishah Azizi of Pakatan Harapan (PH) by a majority of 10,039 votes.

== Election results ==
Selangor State Legislative Assembly
Year	Constituency	Candidate	Votes	Pct	Opponent(s)	Votes	Pct	Ballots cast	Majority	Turnout
2023	N43 Sementa	Noor Najhan Mohamad Salleh (PAS)	32,300	59.20%	Erni Afrishah Azizi (PKR)	22,261	40.80%	54,561	10,039	79.11%
