= Sementa =

State constituency in Selangor, Malaysia

Sementa (N43)
Selangor constituency

State constituency
- Legislature: Selangor State Legislative Assembly
MLA
Noor Najhan Mohamad Salleh
PN
- Constituency created: 1958
- First contested: 1959
- Last contested: 2023

Demographics
- Electors (2023): 68,969

Sementa is a state constituency in Selangor, Malaysia, that has been represented in the Selangor State Legislative Assembly since 1959. It has been represented by Noor Najhan Mohamad Salleh of Perikatan Nasional (PN) since 2023.

The state constituency was created in the 1958 redistribution and is mandated to return a single member to the Selangor State Legislative Assembly under the first past the post voting system.

== Demographics ==
Ethnic breakdown of Sementa's electorate as of 2023
1. Malay (74.4%)
2. Chinese (13.3%)
3. Indian (10.2%)
4. Other ethnicities (2.10%)

== History ==
=== Polling districts ===
According to the federal gazette issued on 30 March 2018, the Sementa constituency is divided into 16 polling districts.

State constituency	Polling Districts	Code	Location
Sementa (N43)	Kampung Sungai Serdang	109/43/01	SK Sungai Serdang Kapar
Sementa (N43)	Kampung Tok Muda	109/43/02	SK Tok Muda Kapar
Sementa (N43)	Perepat	109/43/03	SRA Kampung Perepat
Sementa (N43)	Sementa	109/43/04	SK Sementa
Sementa (N43)	Kampung Batu Empat	109/43/05	SMK Rantau Panjang
Sementa (N43)	Batu 11 & 12 Kapar	109/43/06	SRA Pekan Kapar
Sementa (N43)	Taman Sri Kerayong	109/43/07	Dewan Sri Kerayong
Sementa (N43)	Taman Chempaka Sari	109/43/08	SRA Batu 4 Jalan Haji Sirat
Sementa (N43)	Kapar	109/43/09	SJK (T) Methodist Kapar
Sementa (N43)	Bukit Kapar Utara	109/43/10	SK Bukit Kapar
Sementa (N43)	Bukit Kapar Selatan	109/43/11	SRA Bukit Kapar Barat
Sementa (N43)	Kampung Sungai Pinang	109/43/12	Dewan Sungai Pinang
Sementa (N43)	Rantau Panjang	109/43/13	SK Rantau Panjang Klang
Sementa (N43)	Kampung Batu Tiga	109/43/14	SRA Nurul Ehsan Batu 3 Sungai Pinang
Sementa (N43)	Teluk Kapas	109/43/15	SRA Rantau Panjang
Sementa (N43)	Taman Klang Perdana	109/43/16	SMK Sungai Kapar Indah

=== Representation history ===
Members of the Legislative Assembly for Sementa
Assembly	No	Years	Member	Party
Constituency created
1st	N06	1959-1964	Masod Hayati	Alliance (UMNO)
2nd	N06	1964-1969	Lee Eng Teh (李剑桥)	Alliance (MCA)
		1969-1971	Assembly dissolved	
3rd	N06	1971-1974	Chua Kow Eng (蔡高英)	DAP
4th	N20	1974-1978	Onn Ismail	BN (UMNO)
5th	N20	1978-1982	Onn Ismail	BN (UMNO)
6th	N20	1982-1986	Onn Ismail	BN (UMNO)
7th	N14	1986-1990	Md Amin Abd Moin	BN (UMNO)
8th	N14	1990-1994	Abdul Samat Harun	BN (UMNO)
8th	N14	1994-1995	Abd Rahman Palil	BN (UMNO)
9th	N39	1995-1999	Abd Rahman Palil	BN (UMNO)
10th	N39	1999-2004	Abd Rahman Palil	BN (UMNO)
11th	N43	2004-2008	Abd Rahman Palil	BN (UMNO)
12th	N43	2008-2013	Abd Rahman Palil	BN (UMNO)
13th	N43	2013-2015	Daroyah Alwi	PR (PKR)
13th	N43	2015–2018	Daroyah Alwi	PH (PKR)
14th	N43	2018-2020	Daroyah Alwi	PH (PKR)
14th	N43	2020-2022	Daroyah Alwi	PN (BERSATU)
14th	N43	2022-2023	Daroyah Alwi	PBM
15th	N43	2023–present	Noor Najhan Mohamad Salleh	PN (PAS)

== Election results ==
Selangor state election, 2023: Sementa
Party	Candidate	Votes	%	∆%
PN	Noor Najhan Mohamad Salleh	32,300	59.20	▲59.20
PH	Erni Afrishah Azizi	22,261	40.80	▲40.80
Total valid votes		54,561	100.00	
Total rejected ballots		277		
Unreturned ballots		67		
Turnout		54,905	79.61	▼7.58
Registered electors		68,969		
Majority		10,039	18.40	▲4.34
PN gain from PH		Swing		?

Selangor state election, 2018: Sementa
Party	Candidate	Votes	%	∆%
PKR	Daroyah Alwi	17,867	46.80	▼14.03
BN	Saroni Judi	12,497	32.73	▼5.92
PAS	Wan Hasrina Wan Hassan	7,696	20.16	▲20.16
Parti Rakyat Malaysia	Gandhi Nagamuthu	120	0.31	▲0.31
Total valid votes		38,180	100.00	
Total rejected ballots		536		
Unreturned ballots		99		
Turnout		38,815	87.19	▼1.61
Registered electors		44,516		
Majority		5,370	14.06	▼8.12
PKR hold		Swing		

Selangor state election, 2013: Sementa
Party	Candidate	Votes	%	∆%
PKR	Daroyah Alwi	21,520	60.83	▲60.83
BN	Md Ghazali Md Amin	13,674	38.65	▲38.65
Independent	Thuraisingam Subbrayan	182	0.51	▲0.51
Total valid votes		35,376	100.00	
Total rejected ballots		425		
Unreturned ballots		78		
Turnout		35,879	88.80	
Registered electors		40,406		
Majority		7,846	22.18	
PKR gain from BN		Swing		?
Source(s) "Federal Government Gazette - Notice of Contested Election, State Legislative Assembly for the State of Selangor [P.U. (B) 192/2013]" (PDF). Attorney General's Chambers of Malaysia. 26 April 2013. Archived from the original (PDF) on 2019-12-29. "Federal Government Gazette - Results of Contested Election and Statements of the Poll after the Official Addition of Votes, State Constituencies for the State of Selangor [P.U. (B) 233/2013]". Attorney General's Chambers of Malaysia. 22 May 2013. Archived from the original (PDF) on 2018-10-02.

Selangor state election, 2008: Sementa
Party	Candidate	Votes	%	∆%
On the nomination day, Abd Rahman Palil won uncontested.
BN	Abd Rahman Palil			
Total valid votes			100.00	
Total rejected ballots				
Unreturned ballots				
Turnout				
Registered electors				
Majority				
BN hold		Swing		

Selangor state election, 2004: Sementa
Party	Candidate	Votes	%	∆%
BN	Abd Rahman Palil	12,996	70.99	▲15.07
PKR	Abdul Rahman Ibrahim	5,311	29.01	▼10.24
Total valid votes		18,307	100.00	
Total rejected ballots		387		
Unreturned ballots		0		
Turnout		18,694	72.45	▼3.30
Registered electors		25,803		
Majority		7,685	41.98	▲25.31
BN hold		Swing		

Selangor state election, 1999: Sementa
Party	Candidate	Votes	%	∆%
BN	Abd Rahman Palil	11,301	55.92	▼16.75
PKR	Hamidzun Khairuddin	7,932	39.25	▲39.25
Independent	N. Tamilarasani @ Kim Chai	975	4.82	▲4.82
Total valid votes		20,208	100.00	
Total rejected ballots		469		
Unreturned ballots		9		
Turnout		20,686	75.75	▲1.55
Registered electors		27,310		
Majority		3,369	16.67	▼39.31
BN hold		Swing		

Selangor state election, 1995: Sementa
Party	Candidate	Votes	%	∆%
BN	Abd Rahman Palil	12,262	72.67	▼8.26
DAP	Deligannu Allagan	2,816	16.69	▲16.69
PAS	Mohd Kusrin Rahmad	1,795	10.64	▼8.43
Total valid votes		16,873	100.00	
Total rejected ballots		397		
Unreturned ballots		20		
Turnout		17,290	74.20	▲16.30
Registered electors		23,302		
Majority		9,446	55.98	▼5.88
BN hold		Swing		

Selangor state by-election, 5 February 1994: Sementa Upon the death of incumbent, Abdul Samat Harun
Party	Candidate	Votes	%	∆%
BN	Abd Rahman Palil	7,898	80.93	▲16.12
PAS	Mohsinon Tahir	1,861	19.07	▲19.07
Total valid votes		9,759	100.00	
Total rejected ballots		211		
Unreturned ballots		0		
Turnout		9,970	57.90	▼19.78
Registered electors		17,219		
Majority		6,037	61.86	▲32.24
BN hold		Swing		

Selangor state election, 1990: Sementa
Party	Candidate	Votes	%	∆%
BN	Abdul Samat Harun	7,644	64.81	▼12.86
S46	S. G. Segaran	4,151	35.19	▲35.19
Total valid votes		11,795	100.00	
Total rejected ballots		493		
Unreturned ballots		0		
Turnout		12,288	77.68	▲4.03
Registered electors		15,818		
Majority		3,493	29.62	▼25.72
BN hold		Swing		

Selangor state election, 1986: Sementa
Party	Candidate	Votes	%	∆%
BN	Md Amin Abd Moin	6,610	77.67	▲3.83
PAS	Mohd Yusof Jasmin	1,900	22.33	▲6.16
Total valid votes		8,510	100.00	
Total rejected ballots		297		
Unreturned ballots		0		
Turnout		8,807	73.65	▲0.12
Registered electors		11,958		
Majority		4,710	55.34	▼2.33
BN hold		Swing		

Selangor state election, 1982: Sementa
Party	Candidate	Votes	%	∆%
BN	Onn Ismail	9,054	73.84	▲2.09
PAS	Zainudin Rawi	1,983	16.17	▼7.90
DAP	Hussin Kussan	1,225	9.99	▲9.99
Total valid votes		12,262	100.00	
Total rejected ballots		213		
Unreturned ballots		0		
Turnout		12,475	73.53	▲1.43
Registered electors		16,965		
Majority		7,071	57.67	▲5.80
BN hold		Swing		

Selangor state election, 1978: Sementa
Party	Candidate	Votes	%	∆%
BN	Onn Ismail	6,890	75.9	▼2.46
PAS	Dahalan Rezwan	2,184	24.07	▲24.07
Total valid votes		9,074	100.00	
Total rejected ballots		671		
Unreturned ballots		0		
Turnout		9,745	72.10	▲0.26
Registered electors		13,516		
Majority		4,706	51.86	▼14.11
BN hold		Swing		

Selangor state election, 1974: Sementa
Party	Candidate	Votes	%	∆%
BN	Onn Ismail	3,954	78.36	▲43.76
PEKEMAS	A. V. Kathiah	625	12.39	▲12.39
DAP	Abdul Aziz Ismail	467	9.25	▼43.50
Total valid votes		5,046	100.00	
Total rejected ballots		380		
Unreturned ballots		0		
Turnout		5,426	71.84	▲2.03
Registered electors		7,553		
Majority		3,329	65.97	▲47.82
BN gain from DAP		Swing		?

Selangor state election, 1969: Sementa
Party	Candidate	Votes	%	∆%
DAP	Chua Kow Eng	4,664	52.75	▲52.75
Alliance	Wong Tai Mooi	3,059	34.60	▼13.24
PMIP	Norhadi Hasan Ali	1,118	12.65	▲12.65
Total valid votes		8,841	100.00	
Total rejected ballots		682		
Unreturned ballots		0		
Turnout		9,523	69.81	▼11.73
Registered electors		13,641		
Majority		1,605	18.15	▲7.11
DAP gain from Alliance Party (Malaysia) Party (Malaysia)		Swing		?

Selangor state election, 1964: Sementa
Party	Candidate	Votes	%	∆%
Alliance	Lee Eng Teh	4,440	47.84	▼32.58
Socialist Front	Tee Guan Seng	3,415	36.80	▲36.80
PPP	Fung Ah Chat	1,016	10.95	▲10.95
PMIP	Jarmani Mohamed Umar	409	4.41	▼15.17
Total valid votes		9,280	100.00	
Total rejected ballots		381		
Unreturned ballots		0		
Turnout		9,661	81.54	▲11.97
Registered electors		11,848		
Majority		1,025	11.04	▼49.80
Alliance hold		Swing		

Selangor state election, 1959: Sementa
Party	Candidate	Votes	%
Alliance	Masod Hayati	4,139	80.42
PMIP	Ahmad Hassan	1,008	19.58
Total valid votes		5,147	100.00
Total rejected ballots		170	
Unreturned ballots		0	
Turnout		5,317	69.57
Registered electors		7,643	
Majority		3,131	60.84
This was a new constituency created.
