= Noh Omar =

Malaysian politician and lawyer

Yang Berbahagia Tan Sri Datuk Seri Noh Omar PSM DGSM DPMS DMSM DSAP KMN AMS PJK JP
- نوح عمر
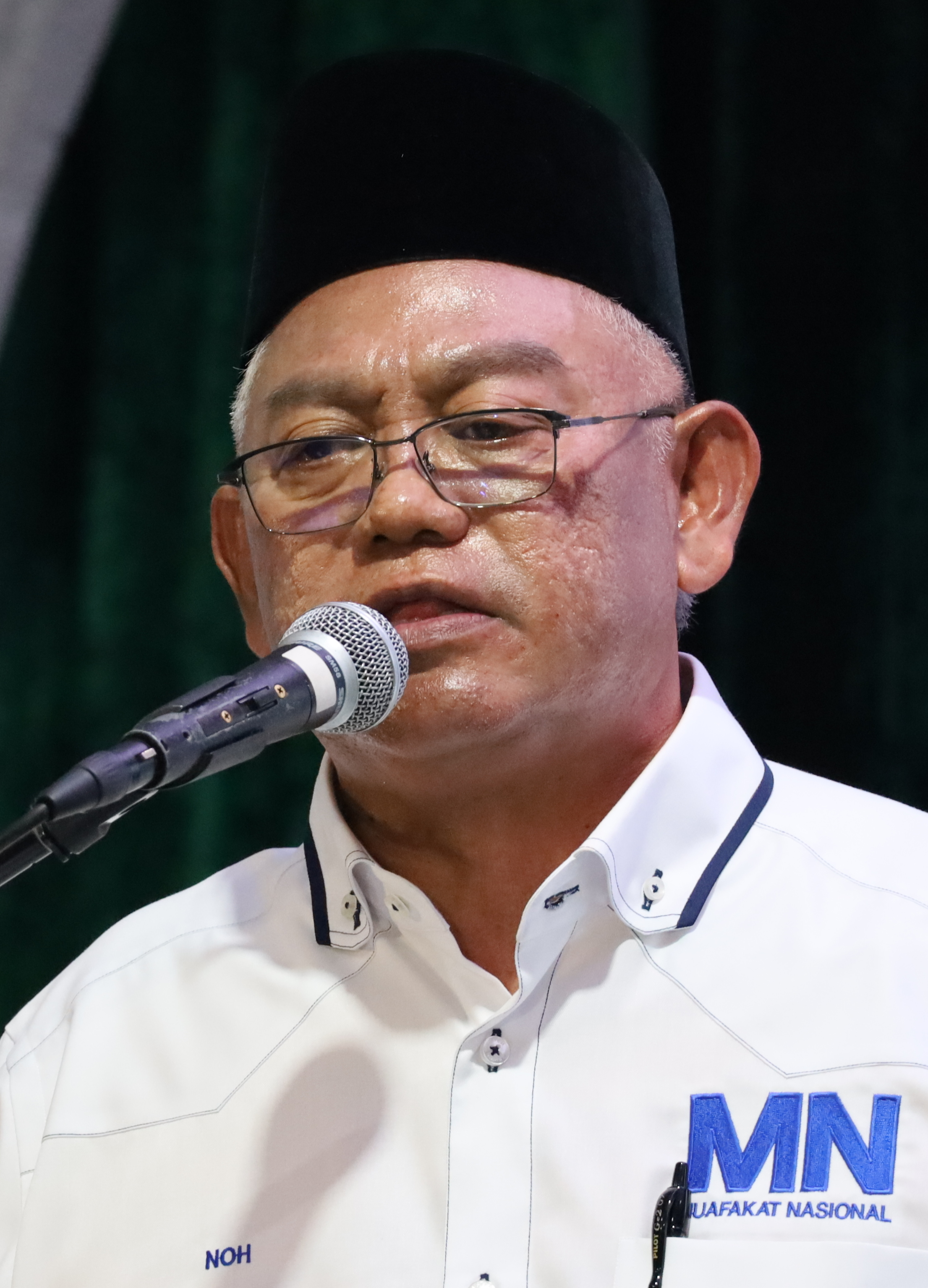
- Noh Omar in 2024

Minister of Entrepreneur Development and Cooperative
- In office 11 September 2021 – 24 November 2022
- Monarch: Abdullah
- Prime Minister: Ismail Sabri Yaakob
- Deputy: Muslimin Yahaya
- Preceded by: Wan Junaidi Tuanku Jaafar
- Succeeded by: Ewon Benedick
- Constituency: Tanjong Karang
- In office 18 March 2008 – 9 April 2009
- Monarch: Mizan Zainal Abidin
- Prime Minister: Abdullah Ahmad Badawi
- Deputy: Saifuddin Abdullah
- Preceded by: Mohamed Khaled Nordin
- Succeeded by: Ismail Sabri Yaakob (Minister of Domestic Trade, Co-operatives and Consumerism)
- Constituency: Tanjong Karang

Minister of Urban Wellbeing, Housing and Local Government
- In office 27 June 2016 – 9 May 2018
- Monarchs: Abdul Halim; Muhammad V
- Prime Minister: Najib Razak
- Deputy: Halimah Mohamed Sadique
- Preceded by: Abdul Rahman Dahlan
- Succeeded by: Zuraida Kamaruddin (Minister of Housing and Local Government); Waytha Moorthy Ponnusamy (Minister in the Prime Minister's Department (Social Wellbeing))
- Constituency: Tanjong Karang

Minister for Agriculture and Agro-based Industry
- In office 10 April 2009 – 15 May 2013
- Monarchs: Mizan Zainal Abidin; Abdul Halim
- Prime Minister: Najib Razak
- Deputy: Rohani Abdul Karim (2009–2010); Mohd Johari Baharum (2009–2013); Chua Tee Yong (2010–2013)
- Preceded by: Mustapa Mohamed
- Succeeded by: Ismail Sabri Yaakob
- Constituency: Tanjong Karang

Deputy Minister of Education I
- In office 14 February 2006 – 18 March 2008 Serving with Han Choon Kim
- Monarchs: Sirajuddin; Mizan Zainal Abidin
- Prime Minister: Abdullah Ahmad Badawi
- Minister: Hishammuddin Hussein
- Preceded by: Mahadzir Mohd Khir
- Succeeded by: Razali Ismail
- Constituency: Tanjong Karang

Deputy Minister of Internal Security
- In office 27 March 2004 – 14 February 2006 Serving with Chia Kwang Chye
- Monarch: Sirajuddin
- Prime Minister: Abdullah Ahmad Badawi
- Minister: Abdullah Ahmad Badawi
- Preceded by: Zainal Abidin Zin (Deputy Minister of Home Affairs)
- Succeeded by: Mohd Johari Baharum
- Constituency: Tanjong Karang

Parliamentary Secretary, Prime Minister's Department
- In office 15 December 1999 – 26 March 2004
- Monarchs: Salahuddin; Sirajuddin
- Prime Minister: Mahathir Mohamad; Abdullah Ahmad Badawi
- Minister: Abdul Hamid Othman (1999–2001); Abdul Hamid Zainal Abidin (2001–2004)
- Preceded by: Muhammad Abdullah
- Succeeded by: Mashitah Ibrahim
- Constituency: Tanjong Karang

Chairman of the Perbadanan Usahawan Nasional Berhad
- In office 23 June 2020 – 1 September 2021
- Minister: Wan Junaidi Tuanku Jaafar
- Chief Executive Officer: Izwan Zainuddin
- Preceded by: Hazimah Zainuddin
- Succeeded by: Ahmad Nazlan Idris

Member of the Supreme Council of the Malaysian United Indigenous Party
- In office 18 January 2025 – 14 February 2026
- President: Muhyiddin Yassin

Member of the Malaysian Parliament for Tanjong Karang
- In office 25 April 1995 – 19 November 2022
- Preceded by: Saidin Adam (BN–UMNO)
- Succeeded by: Zulkafperi Hanapi (PN–BERSATU)
- Majority: 15,818 (1995); 2,075 (1999); 9,008 (2004); 3,820 (2008); 4,394 (2013); 1,970 (2018)

Faction represented in Dewan Rakyat
- 1995–2022: Barisan Nasional

Personal details
- Born: Noh bin Omar; 23 February 1958 (age 68) Sungai Burong, Tanjung Karang, Selangor, Federation of Malaya (now Malaysia)
- Party: United Malays National Organisation (UMNO) (1995–2023); Malaysian United Indigenous Party (BERSATU) (2024–2026)
- Other political affiliations: Barisan Nasional (BN) (1995–2023); Perikatan Nasional (PN) (2024–2026)
- Spouse(s): Aishah Salleh; Nooraisha Farizan
- Children: 7 (including Nurul Syazwani)
- Education: Thames Valley University (LLB)
- Occupation: Politician
- Profession: Lawyer
- Noh Omar on Facebook; Noh Omar on Parliament of Malaysia

Noh bin Omar (Jawi: نوح بن عمر; born 23 February 1958) is a Malaysian politician and lawyer who served as the Minister of Entrepreneur Development and Cooperative for second term in the Barisan Nasional (BN) administration under former Prime Minister Ismail Sabri Yaakob from September 2021 to the collapse of the BN administration in November 2022 and the first term in the BN administration under former Prime Minister Abdullah Ahmad Badawi from March 2008 to April 2009, Minister of Urban Wellbeing, Housing and Local Government from June 2016 to the collapse of the BN administration in May 2018, Chairman of the Perbadanan Usahawan Nasional Berhad (PUNB) from June 2020 to September 2021. He also served as the Member of Parliament (MP) for Tanjong Karang from April 1995 to November 2022. He is a member of the Malaysian United Indigenous Party (BERSATU), a component party of the Perikatan Nasional (PN) coalition and was a member of the United Malays National Organisation (UMNO), a component party of the Barisan Nasional (BN) coalition. He has served as Member of the Supreme Council of BERSATU since January 2025. He was also the State Chairman of BN and UMNO of Selangor. He is also the father of Nurul Syazwani Noh, Member of the Selangor State Legislative Assembly (MLA) for Permatang.

== Early life and education ==
Noh was born on 23 February 1958 at Sungai Burong, Tanjung Karang, Selangor. He had his early education at Sekolah Rendah Kebangsaan Sungai Burong (1965), later Sekolah Menengah Aminuddin Baki (1977) and then Maktab Perguruan Temenggong Ibrahim. He continued his studies at Thames Valley University with a Bachelor of Laws (LLB).

== Early career ==
He was a teacher in Sekolah Menengah Kebangsaan Sultan Abdul Aziz Shah in 1983 and went on to work as a legal officer at Majlis Amanah Rakyat (MARA) in 1988 before starting his own law firm, Ahmad Famy & Noh.

== Political career ==
Noh was appointed as member of the Drainage Board of the District of Sabak Bernam from 1 January to 31 December 2001.

Noh was appointed to the cabinet by Prime Minister Abdullah Badawi as Minister for Entrepreneur and Co-operative Development after the 2008 election. On 10 April 2009, he was appointed Minister for Agriculture and Agro-based Industry by Abdullah's successor, Prime Minister Najib Razak. Noh was dropped from the cabinet after the 2013 election before being reappointed Minister of Urban Wellbeing, Housing and Local Government in 2016.

Despite Barisan Nasional's poor performance in the 2018 election, which saw the coalition suffer its first defeat in a general election, Noh managed to retain his parliamentary seat with a reduced majority.

He was appointed Minister of Entrepreneur Development and Cooperative by Prime Minister Ismail Sabri Yaakob in 2021, remaining in the role until the 2022 election. Noh was among a number of high-profile United Malay National Organisation (UMNO), a component party of BN, members not selected to contest in the 2022 election. He later claimed that he was not invited to the party's seat negotiations. The election saw BN suffer its largest ever defeat, winning only 30 seats. The poor showing prompted Noh to resign as BN and UMNO Selangor state chairman and demand the resignation of party president Ahmad Zahid Hamidi, saying that he had lost faith in the latter's leadership.

Initially handed a six-year suspension by the party during a meeting of the party's supreme council, of which he was a member, Noh requested that he be dismissed from UMNO entirely instead, which party president Zahid agreed to. Noh claimed that the suspension did not follow party procedure, as his meeting with the disciplinary board had been scheduled to be held in three days. The disciplinary action undertaken by UMNO against Noh and various other party members have been described as a purge .

=== 2023 Selangor state election ===
On 30 April 2023, Noh announced that he would be nominated by PN to contest the 2023 Selangor state election. He also added that he would not just be a political spectator but would take part in political contests despite being sacked from UMNO. However, on 18 June 2023, Noh decided not to contest in the state elections to pave way and give opportunities to the younger leaders. He would however campaign for PN to carry on his political struggle.

Noh joined BERSATU on 4 July 2024.

== Controversies and issues ==
In 2005, as Deputy Minister of Internal Security, Noh made international news for his role in the Squatgate controversy concerning the alleged mistreatment of an ethnic Chinese woman by Malaysian police. In response to the revelation of mistreatment and protests by the Chinese government, Noh stated "if foreigners think that Malaysia police are brutal, please go back to their own countries and not to stay here". Noh was reprimanded by Prime Minister Abdullah Badawi, and Noh issued an apology for his comments that BBC News described as 'grudging at best'.

In 2012, Noh Omar was accused of conflict of interest and abusing his power as Minister of Agriculture and Agro-based Industry and member of parliament for Tanjong Karang for entering a joint-venture to run a prawn farm in 2011 on 30-acres of land, which he had allegedly bought for RM100,000 at below market price, with the certificate of ownership being issued by the Selangor Land Ownership Registrar in September 2009, five months after Noh was appointed to his current cabinet position. Under the joint-venture's agreement, Noh had given consent to Pristine Agrofood Sdn Bhd to operate the prawn farm on the land for 10 years for at least RM25,200 per year. Documents also showed that Noh inked a private caveat sought by Pristine Agrofood to not sell the land for 10 years.

Noh Omar was also questioned over the Programme of Peoples' Rice Subsidy Voucher or SUBUR (Malay: Baucer Subsidi Beras Untuk Rakyat), formed to manage the distribution of rice for needy peoples, introduced when he was the Minister for Agriculture and Agro-based Industry.

In 2016, as Minister of Urban Wellbeing, Housing and Local Government, he introduced a controversial initiative that would have enabled property developers to give out loans to buyers at an interest rate of 12 per cent with collateral and 18 per cent without collateral. Noh said that the move was intended to assist Malaysians who had been unable to get a full housing loan from banks or those who may only be given a partial housing loan. The proposal was lauded by the Malaysian Real Estate and Housing Developers’ Association (Rehda) as it claimed that it helps developers who were finding it difficult to sell homes as more home buyers were being denied loans by banks. However, the proposal was met with fierce opposition, including from his fellow cabinet member, Second Finance Minister Johari Abdul Ghani who deemed the proposal "illogical and unsustainable", The Malaysian National House Buyers Association as well as CIMB chairman Datuk Seri Nazir Razak who labelled the idea "dangerous".

In the lead-up to the 2018 Malaysian general election, Noh was one of seven MPs from the ruling Barisan Nasional coalition named on electoral watchdog Bersih's "Election Offenses Hall of Shame". He was criticised for misusing resources from the Ministry of Urban Wellbeing, Housing and Local Government, which he is the minister of, to hold campaign events in Gombak. He was also recorded giving out cash while campaigning in the area, which was held by then Selangor chief minister Azmin Ali. Bersih, a non-governmental organisation dedicated to electoral reform referred to the act as "bribery" and "an attempt to unduly influence voters".

During a parliamentary seating in April 2019, he made a series of controversial remarks, stating that “Stealing is not wrong, only when you are arrested it becomes wrong. Riding a motorcycle without a helmet is not wrong; only when the police arrest you, it becomes wrong.” Noh Omar gave the analogy while trying to demand equal treatment for politicians entering schools, as principals who had allowed him to enter their premises had been warned by the State Education Department, as existing regulations necessitated that politicians receive clearance from the State Education Departments before any school visits. Noh claimed that this regulation was not enforced by previous Barisan Nasional governments, whilst RSN Rayer from the Democratic Action Party, a component of the then-ruling Pakatan Harapan coalition countered that its members of parliament were denied entry to visit schools by respective State Education Departments under previous Barisan Nasional governments when they were part of the opposition.

== Personal life ==
Noh is married to Prof. Dr. Aishah Salleh and the couple has one daughter; Nurul Syazwani, who is currently the Member of the Selangor State Legislative Assembly for Permatang. In 2006, he married Nooraisha Farizan and the couple have two sons and one daughter.

== Election results ==
Parliament of Malaysia
Year	Constituency	Candidate	Votes	Pct	Opponent(s)	Votes	Pct	Ballots cast	Majority	Turnout
1995	P087 Tanjong Karang	Noh Omar (UMNO)	20,962	76.48%	Nordin Abdul Latif (S46)	5,144	18.77%	27,410	15,818	66.59%
1999	P087 Tanjong Karang	Noh Omar (UMNO)	15,841	51.98%	Md Yusoff Abd Wahab (PAS)	13,766	45.17%	30,478	2,075	72.37%
2004	P095 Tanjong Karang	Noh Omar (UMNO)	17,750	65.27%	Abdul Ghani Samsudin (PAS)	8,742	32.14%	27,196	9,008	75.93%
2008	P095 Tanjong Karang	Noh Omar (UMNO)	16,073	55.32%	Mohamed Hanipa Maidin (PAS)	12,253	42.18%	29,052	3,820	79.83%
2013	P095 Tanjong Karang	Noh Omar (UMNO)	20,548	54.40%	Mohd Rashidi Deraman (PAS)	16,154	42.77%	37,768	4,394	89.22%
2013	P095 Tanjong Karang	Noh Omar (UMNO)	20,548	54.40%	Masrun Tamsi @ Herman Tino (IND)	340	0.90%	37,768	4,394	89.22%
2018	P095 Tanjong Karang	Noh Omar (UMNO)	17,596	43.45%	Zulkafperi Hanapi (BERSATU)	15,626	38.58%	41,184	1,970	87.26%
2018	P095 Tanjong Karang	Noh Omar (UMNO)	17,596	43.45%	Nor Az Azlan Ahmad (PAS)	7,276	17.97%	41,184	1,970	87.26%

== Honours ==
=== Honours of Malaysia ===
- Malaysia
  - Commander of the Order of Loyalty to the Crown of Malaysia (PSM) – Tan Sri (2016)
  - Officer of the Order of the Defender of the Realm (KMN) (1999)
- Malacca
  - Grand Commander of the Exalted Order of Malacca (DGSM) – Datuk Seri (2009)
  - Companion of the Exalted Order of Malacca (DMSM) – Datuk (2000)
- Pahang
  - Knight Companion of the Order of Sultan Ahmad Shah of Pahang (DSAP) – Dato' (2005)
- Selangor
  - Knight Commander of the Order of the Crown of Selangor (DPMS) – Dato' (2001)
  - Member of the Order of the Crown of Selangor (AMS) (1996)
  - Recipient of the Meritorious Service Medal (PJK) (1994)
  - Justice of the Peace (JP) (1999)
