= Tanjong Karang (federal constituency) =

Federal constituency of Selangor, Malaysia

Tanjong Karang (P095)
Selangor constituency

Federal constituency
- Legislature: Dewan Rakyat
- MP: Zulkafperi Hanapi; PN
- Constituency created: 1974
- First contested: 1974
- Last contested: 2022

Demographics
- Population (2020): 59,862
- Electors (2023): 62,511
- Area (km²): 779
- Pop. density (per km²): 76.8

Tanjong Karang is a federal constituency in Kuala Selangor District and Hulu Selangor District, Selangor, Malaysia, that has been represented in the Dewan Rakyat since 1974.

The federal constituency was created in the 1974 redistribution and is mandated to return a single member to the Dewan Rakyat under the first past the post voting system.

== Demographics ==
Ethnic breakdown of Tanjong Karang's electorate as of 2018
1. Malay (74.7%)
2. Chinese (17.2%)
3. Indian (8.00%)
4. Other ethnicities (0.20%)
Age breakdown of Tanjong Karang's electorate as of 2022
1. 18-20 (6.17%)
2. 21-29 (21.2%)
3. 30-39 (23.3%)
4. 40-49 (17.7%)
5. 50-59 (14.7%)
6. 60-69 (10.1%)
7. 70-79 (5.03%)
8. 80-89 (1.51%)
9. above 90 (0.37%)
Gender breakdown of Tanjong Karang's electorate as of 2022
1. Male (50.2%)
2. Female (49.8%)

== History ==
=== Polling districts ===
According to the gazette issued on 18 July 2023, the Tanjong Karang constituency has a total of 34 polling districts.

State constituency	Polling districts	Code	Location
Sungai Burong（N08）	Terusan Besar	095/08/01	SK Berjaya Sekinchan
Sungai Burong（N08）	Sawah Sempadan Utara	095/08/02	SA Rakyat (KAFA) Al-Ainiah Blok B 1 & B Sawah Sempadan
Sungai Burong（N08）	Sungai Burong Bendang	095/08/03	SK Parit Empat Sekinchan
Sungai Burong（N08）	Sungai Burong Utara	095/08/04	SRA Batu 12 Tanjong Karang
Sungai Burong（N08）	Sungai Burong Selatan	095/08/05	SK Sungai Burong
Sungai Burong（N08）	Batu 9 Tanjong Karang	095/08/06	SMA Tanjong Karang
Sungai Burong（N08）	Sungai Sireh	095/08/07	SK Sungai Sireh
Sungai Burong（N08）	Sungai Sireh Utara	095/08/08	SK Seri Gambut Tanjong Karang
Sungai Burong（N08）	Sawah Sempadan Selatan	095/08/09	SRA Kunci Air Buang
Sungai Burong（N08）	Sungai Tengi Kanan	095/08/10	SK Dato' Manan Tanjong Karang
Sungai Burong（N08）	Sungai Kajang	095/08/11	SMK Seri Desa Tanjong Karang
Sungai Burong（N08）	Pekan Tanjong Karang	095/08/12	SMK Dato' Harun Tanjong Karang
Sungai Burong（N08）	Batu 7 Tanjong Karang	095/08/13	SK Tanjong Karang
Sungai Burong（N08）	Batu 11 Tanjong Karang	095/08/14	SRA Batu 11, Jalan Bernam Tanjong Karang
Sungai Burong（N08）	Bagan Pasir Tanjong Karang	095/08/15	SJK (C) Yit Khwan Bagan Tanjong Karang
Permatang（N09）	Hulu Tiram Buruk	095/09/01	SK Sri Tiram Tanjong Karang
Permatang（N09）	Hulu Tiram Buruk Utara	095/09/02	Balai Raya Blok Q Sawah Sempadan
Permatang（N09）	Batang Berjuntai Satu	095/09/03	KAFA Integrasi Al Ridzuan Berjuntai Bistari
Permatang（N09）	Ladang Mary	095/09/04	SJK (T) Ladang Mary
Permatang（N09）	Sungai Tinggi	095/09/05	SJK (T) Ladang Sungai Tinggi
Permatang（N09）	Batang Berjuntai Utara	095/09/06	Dewan Seberguna Sime Darby Ladang Tennamaran
Permatang（N09）	Kampung Raja Musa	095/09/07	SK Jalan Raja Musa
Permatang（N09）	Ladang Raja Musa	095/09/08	SJK (T) Ladang Raja Musa
Permatang（N09）	Kampung Baharu Tiram Buruk	095/09/09	SJK (C) Ming Tee Kampung Tiram Buruk Luar
Permatang（N09）	Parit Serong	095/09/10	SK Parit Serong
Permatang（N09）	Sungai Gulang-Gulang	095/09/11	Dewan Orang Ramai Kampong Sungai Gulang-Gulang
Permatang（N09）	Hujung Permatang	095/09/12	SRA Ujung Permatang
Permatang（N09）	Belimbing	095/09/13	SK Bukit Belimbing
Permatang（N09）	Permatang	095/09/14	SK Kuala Selangor
Permatang（N09）	Pasir Penambang	095/09/15	SJK (C) Khai Tee Pasir Penambang
Permatang（N09）	Sungai Yu	095/09/16	SA KAFA Integrasi As-Sulaimiah Kampung Sungai Yu
Permatang（N09）	Sungai Terap	096/09/17	SK Sungai Terap
Permatang（N09）	Sawah Sempadan	096/09/18	SRA Blok "P" Sawah Sempadan Tanjong Karang
Permatang（N09）	Kampung Lubuk Jaya	095/09/19	Balai Raya Kampung Lubuk Jaya

=== Representation history ===
Members of Parliament for Tanjong Karang
Parliament	No	Years	Member	Party	Vote Share
Constituency created from Kuala Selangor and Sabak Bernam
4th	P075	1974–1978	Jamil Ishak (جامل إسحاق）	BN (UMNO)	Uncontested
5th	P075	1978–1982	Abdul Shukur Siraj (عبدالشكور سراج)	BN (UMNO)	13,413; 64.81%
6th	P075	1982–1986	Zaleha Ismail (صالحة إسماعيل)	BN (UMNO)	16,396; 75.44%
7th	P083	1986–1990	Kamaruzaman Ahmad (قمرالزمان أحمد)	BN (UMNO)	13,360; 69.33%
8th	P083	1990–1995	Saidin Adam (سعيدين آدم)	BN (UMNO)	15,468; 68.26%
9th	P087	1995–1999	Noh Omar (نوح عمر)	BN (UMNO)	20,962; 80.30%
10th	P087	1999–2004	Noh Omar (نوح عمر)	BN (UMNO)	15,841; 53.50%
11th	P095	2004–2008	Noh Omar (نوح عمر)	BN (UMNO)	17,750; 67.00%
12th	P095	2008–2013	Noh Omar (نوح عمر)	BN (UMNO)	16,073; 56.74%
13th	P095	2013–2018	Noh Omar (نوح عمر)	BN (UMNO)	20,548; 55.47%
14th	P095	2018–2022	Noh Omar (نوح عمر)	BN (UMNO)	17,596; 43.45%
15th	P095	2022– Present	Zulkafperi Hanapi (ذولكافڤري حنڤي)	PN (BERSATU)	18,054; 35.26%

=== State constituency ===
Parliamentary constituency	State constituency						
Parliamentary constituency	1955–59*	1959–1974	1974–1986	1986–1995	1995–2004	2004–2018	2018–present
Tanjong Karang						Permatang	
Tanjong Karang			Sekinchan				
Tanjong Karang				Sungai Burong		Sungai Burong	
Tanjong Karang					Sungai Burung		
Tanjong Karang				Sungai Panjang			
Tanjong Karang			Sungei Burong				
Tanjong Karang			Sungei Panjang				

=== Historical boundaries ===
State Constituency	Area				
State Constituency	1974	1984	1994	2003	2018
Permatang				Jalan Raja Musa; Kampung Bukit Belimbing; Ladang Sungai Tinggi; Parit Serong; Pasir Penambang	
Sekinchan	Kampung Nelayan; Sungai Leman; Sekinchan; Tepi Sawah; Kampung Tali Air				
Sungai Burong	Kampung Kunci Air Buang; Kampung Melaka; Kampung Sungai Kajang; Sungai Burong; Tanjong Karang	Kampung Haji Razali; Kampung Melaka; Kampung Sungai Kajang; Sungai Burong; Tanjong Karang	Kampung Kunci Air Buang; Kampung Melaka; Kampung Seri Tiram Jaya; Sungai Burong; Tanjong Karang	Kampung Melaka; Kampung Sungai Kajang; Sungai Burong; Sungai Sireh; Tanjong Karang	
Sungai Panjang	Kampung Belia Dua; Kampung Nipah; Kampung Sungai Haji Dorani; Kampung Sungai Nibong; Pasir Panjang				

=== Current state assembly members ===
No.	State Constituency	Member	Coalition (Party)
N08	Sungai Burong	Mohd Zamri Mohd Zainuldin	PN (PAS)
N09	Permatang	Nurul Syazwani Noh	PN (BERSATU)

=== Local governments & postcodes ===
No.	State Constituency	Local Government	Postcode
N08	Sungai Burong	Kuala Selangor Municipal Council	45000 Kuala Selangor; 45500 Tanjong Karang
N09	Permatang	Hulu Selangor Municipal Council (Sungai Tinggi Area); Kuala Selangor Municipal Council	45000 Kuala Selangor; 45500 Tanjong Karang

== Election results ==
Malaysian general election, 2022
Party	Candidate	Votes	%	∆%
PN	Zulkafperi Hanapi	18,054	35.26	▲35.26
BN	Habibah Mohd Yusof	15,874	31.00	▼13.45
MUDA	Siti Rahayu Baharin	12,314	24.05	▲24.05
PEJUANG	Azlan Sani @ Cip Lando Zawawi	3,557	6.95	▲6.95
Independent	Mohd Rosni Mastol	1,406	2.75	▲2.75
Total valid votes		51,025	100.00	
Total rejected ballots		573		
Unreturned ballots		94		
Turnout		51,872	82.33	▼4.93
Registered electors		62,194		
Majority		2,180	4.26	▼0.60
PN gain from BN		Swing		?
Source(s) https://lom.agc.gov.my/ilims/upload/portal/akta/outputp/1753283/PUB612.pdf

Malaysian general election, 2018
Party	Candidate	Votes	%	∆%
BN	Noh Omar	17,596	43.45	▼12.02
PKR	Zulkafperi Hanapi	15,626	38.58	▲38.58
PAS	Nor Az Azlan Ahmad	7,276	17.97	▼25.64
Total valid votes		40,498	100.00	
Total rejected ballots		531		
Unreturned ballots		155		
Turnout		41,184	87.26	▼1.96
Registered electors		47,198		
Majority		1,970	4.86	▼7.00
BN hold		Swing		
Source(s) "His Majesty's Government Gazette - Notice of Contested Election, Parliament for the State of Selangor [P.U. (B) 239/2018]" (PDF). Attorney General's Chambers of Malaysia. 3 May 2018. Archived from the original (PDF) on 2019-07-19. "Federal Government Gazette - Results of Contested Election and Statements of the Poll after the Official Addition of Votes, Parliamentary Constituencies for the State of Selangor [P.U. (B) 313/2018]" (PDF). Attorney General's Chambers of Malaysia. 28 May 2018. Archived from the original (PDF) on 2019-07-19.

Malaysian general election, 2013
Party	Candidate	Votes	%	∆%
BN	Noh Omar	20,548	55.47	▼1.27
PAS	Mohamad Rashdi Deraman	16,154	43.61	▲0.35
Independent	Masrun Tamsi @ Herman Tino	340	0.92	▲0.92
Total valid votes		37,042	100.00	
Total rejected ballots		634		
Unreturned ballots		92		
Turnout		37,768	89.22	▲9.39
Registered electors		42,333		
Majority		4,394	11.86	▼1.62
BN hold		Swing		
Source(s) "Federal Government Gazette - Notice of Contested Election, Parliament for the State of Selangor [P.U. (B) 176/2013]" (PDF). Attorney General's Chambers of Malaysia. 26 April 2013. Archived from the original (PDF) on 2018-09-30. "Federal Government Gazette - Results of Contested Election and Statements of the Poll after the Official Addition of Votes, Parliamentary Constituencies for the State of Selangor [P.U. (B) 217/2013]" (PDF). Attorney General's Chambers of Malaysia. 22 May 2013. Archived from the original (PDF) on 2018-09-30.

Malaysian general election, 2008
Party	Candidate	Votes	%	∆%
BN	Noh Omar	16,073	56.74	▼10.26
PAS	Mohamed Hanipa Maidin	12,253	43.26	▲10.26
Total valid votes		28,326	100.00	
Total rejected ballots		674		
Unreturned ballots		52		
Turnout		29,052	79.83	▲3.90
Registered electors		36,391		
Majority		3,820	13.48	▼20.52
BN hold		Swing		

Malaysian general election, 2004
Party	Candidate	Votes	%	∆%
BN	Noh Omar	17,750	67.00	▲13.50
PAS	Abdul Ghani Samsudin	8,742	33.00	▼13.50
Total valid votes		26,492	100.00	
Total rejected ballots		704		
Unreturned ballots		0		
Turnout		27,196	75.93	▲3.56
Registered electors		35,817		
Majority		9,008	34.00	▲27.00
BN hold		Swing		

Malaysian general election, 1999
Party	Candidate	Votes	%	∆%
BN	Noh Omar	15,841	53.50	▼26.80
PAS	Md. Yusoff Abd. Wahab	13,766	46.50	▲46.50
Total valid votes		29,607	100.00	
Total rejected ballots		863		
Unreturned ballots		8		
Turnout		30,478	72.37	▲5.78
Registered electors		42,114		
Majority		2,075	7.00	▼53.60
BN hold		Swing		

Malaysian general election, 1995
Party	Candidate	Votes	%	∆%
BN	Noh Omar	20,962	80.30	▲12.04
S46	Nordin Abdul Latif	5,144	19.70	▲19.70
Total valid votes		26,106	100.00	
Total rejected ballots		1,303		
Unreturned ballots		1		
Turnout		27,410	66.59	▼5.40
Registered electors		41,162		
Majority		15,818	60.60	▲24.08
BN hold		Swing		

Malaysian general election, 1990
Party	Candidate	Votes	%	∆%
BN	Saidin @ Yusof Adam	15,468	68.26	▼1.07
PAS	Abdul Hakim Abdullah	7,191	31.74	▲1.07
Total valid votes		22,659	100.00	
Total rejected ballots		1,032		
Unreturned ballots		0		
Turnout		23,691	71.99	▼8.57
Registered electors		32,910		
Majority		8,277	36.52	▼2.14
BN hold		Swing		

Malaysian general election, 1986
Party	Candidate	Votes	%	∆%
BN	Kamaruzaman Ahmad	13,360	69.33	▼6.11
PAS	Mohd Fadzil Salleh	5,910	30.67	▲30.67
Total valid votes		19,270	100.00	
Total rejected ballots		888		
Unreturned ballots		0		
Turnout		20,158	63.42	▼5.21
Registered electors		31,785		
Majority		7,450	38.66	▼12.22
BN hold		Swing		

Malaysian general election, 1982
Party	Candidate	Votes	%	∆%
BN	Zaleha Ismail	16,396	75.44	▲10.63
PAS	Abdul Rahim Awang	5,337	24.56	▼10.63
Total valid votes		21,733	100.00	
Total rejected ballots		1,123		
Unreturned ballots		0		
Turnout		22,856	68.63	▼0.37
Registered electors		33,304		
Majority		11,059	50.88	▲21.26
BN hold		Swing		

Malaysian general election, 1978
Party	Candidate	Votes	%	∆%
BN	Abdul Shukur Siraj	13,413	64.81	▲64.81
PAS	Abdul Hakim Abdullah	7,283	35.19	▲35.19
Total valid votes		20,696	100.00	
Total rejected ballots		971		
Unreturned ballots		0		
Turnout		21,667	69.00	
Registered electors		31,403		
Majority		6,130	29.62	
BN hold		Swing		

Malaysian general election, 1974
Party	Candidate	Votes	%
On the nomination day, Jamil Ishak won uncontested.
BN	Jamil Ishak		
Total valid votes			100.00
Total rejected ballots			
Unreturned ballots			
Turnout			
Registered electors		24,227	
Majority			
This was a new constituency created.
