= Rozana Zainal Abidin =

Malaysian politician

- روزانا زين العابدين

Member of the Selangor State Legislative Assembly for Permatang
- In office 9 May 2018 – 12 August 2023
- Preceded by: Sulaiman Abdul Razak (BN–UMNO)
- Succeeded by: Nurul Syazwani Noh (PN–BERSATU)
- Majority: 1,158 (2018)

Vice Women Chief of the People's Justice Party
- Incumbent
- Assumed office 24 May 2025 Serving with: Loh Ker Chean &; Rufinah Pengeran &; Wasanthee Sinnasamy (Appointed)
- Women Chief: Fadhlina Sidek
- Preceded by: Wasanthee Sinnasamy

Personal details
- Born: Rozana binti Zainal Abidin Malaysia
- Citizenship: Malaysia
- Party: People's Justice Party (PKR)
- Other political affiliations: Pakatan Harapan (PH)
- Education: University of Putra Malaysia (Diploma in Taxation)
- Occupation: Politician

Rozana binti Zainal Abidin is a Malaysian politician who served as Member of the Selangor State Legislative Assembly (MLA) for Permatang from May 2018 to August 2023. She is a member of the People's Justice Party (PKR), a component party of the Pakatan Harapan (PH) coalition.

== Election results ==
Selangor State Legislative Assembly
Year	Constituency	Candidate	Votes	Pct	Opponent(s)	Votes	Pct	Ballots cast	Majority	Turnout
2018	N09 Permatang	Rozana Zainal Abidin (PKR)	9,208	46.03%	Sulaiman Abdul Razak (UMNO)	8,050	40.24%	20,358	1,158	87.93%
2018	N09 Permatang	Rozana Zainal Abidin (PKR)	9,208	46.03%	Muhammad Jafarudin Sheik Daud (PAS)	2,746	13.73%	20,358	1,158	87.93%
