= Zulkafperi Hanapi =

Malaysian politician

Yang Berhormat Captain (Rtd) Dato' Dr. Zulkafperi Hanapi DIMP MP
- ذولكافڤري حنڤي

Member of the Malaysian Parliament for Tanjong Karang
- Incumbent
- Assumed office 19 November 2022
- Preceded by: Noh Omar (BN–UMNO)
- Majority: 2,180 (2022)

Faction represented in Dewan Rakyat
- 2022–2024: Perikatan Nasional
- 2024–: Independent

Personal details
- Born: Zulkafperi bin Hanapi; 7 August 1959 (age 66) Raub, Pahang, Federation of Malaya
- Party: Malaysian United Indigenous Party (BERSATU) (until 2024); Independent (since 2024)
- Other political affiliations: Perikatan Nasional (PN) (2020–2024)

Zulkafperi bin Hanapi is a Malaysian politician who has served as the Member of Parliament for Tanjong Karang since November 2022. He was a member of the Malaysian United Indigenous Party (BERSATU), a component party of the Perikatan Nasional (PN) coalition. Currently, he is an independent politician since his BERSATU membership ended on 12 June 2024.

== Political career ==
On 24 January 2024, Zulkafperi declared support for the government led by Prime Minister Anwar Ibrahim, making him the sixth Opposition and PN MP to do so after Kuala Kangsar MP Iskandar Dzulkarnain Abdul Khalid, Labuan MP Suhaili Abdul Rahman, Gua Musang MP Mohd Azizi Abu Naim, Jeli MP Zahari Kechik and Bukit Gantang MP Syed Abu Hussin Hafiz.

== Election results ==
Parliament of Malaysia
Year	Constituency	Candidate	Votes	Pct	Opponent(s)	Votes	Pct	Ballots cast	Majority	Turnout
2018	P095 Tanjong Karang	Zulkafperi Hanapi (BERSATU)	15,626	38.58%	Noh Omar (UMNO)	17,596	43.45%	41,184	1,970	87.26%
2018	P095 Tanjong Karang	Zulkafperi Hanapi (BERSATU)	15,626	38.58%	Nor Az Azlan Ahmad (PAS)	7,276	17.97%	41,184	1,970	87.26%
2022	P095 Tanjong Karang	Zulkafperi Hanapi (BERSATU)	18,054	35.26%	Habibah Mohd Yusof (UMNO)	15,874	31.00%	51,872	2,180	82.33%
2022	P095 Tanjong Karang	Zulkafperi Hanapi (BERSATU)	18,054	35.26%	Siti Rahayu Baharin (MUDA)	12,314	24.05%	51,872	2,180	82.33%
2022	P095 Tanjong Karang	Zulkafperi Hanapi (BERSATU)	18,054	35.26%	Azlan Sani @ Cip Lando Zawawi (PEJUANG)	3,557	6.95%	51,872	2,180	82.33%
2022	P095 Tanjong Karang	Zulkafperi Hanapi (BERSATU)	18,054	35.26%	Mohd Rosni Mastol (IND)	1,406	2.75%	51,872	2,180	82.33%

== Honours ==
=== Honours of Malaysia ===
- Malaysia
  - Recipient of the 17th Yang di-Pertuan Agong Installation Medal (2024)
- Pahang
  - Knight Companion of the Order of the Crown of Pahang (DIMP) – Dato' (2007)

== See also ==
- Tanjong Karang (federal constituency)
