= Mohd Shamsudin Lias =

Malaysian politician

Yang Berbahagia Dato' Mohd Shamsudin Lias DPMS SSA
- محمد شامس الدين لياس
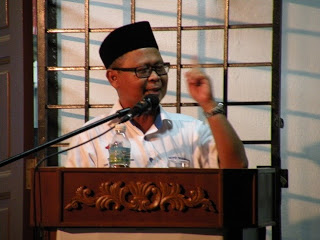
- Shamsudin during a speech for Sungai Burong Constituency.

State Leader of the Opposition of Selangor
- In office 20 June 2013 – 8 December 2014
- Monarch: Sharafuddin
- Menteri Besar: Khalid Ibrahim (2013–2014); Azmin Ali (2014)
- Preceded by: Mohamad Satim Diman
- Succeeded by: Rizam Ismail
- Constituency: Sungai Burong

Member of the Selangor State Legislative Assembly for Sungai Burong
- In office 21 March 2004 – 12 August 2023
- Preceded by: Hasan Mohamed Ali (PAS)
- Succeeded by: Mohd Zamri Mohd Zainuldin (PN–PAS)
- Majority: 4,520 (2004); 2,710 (2008); 3,013 (2013); 2,330 (2018)

Personal details
- Born: Mohd Shamsudin bin Lias; 15 December 1953 (age 72) Selangor, Federation of Malaya (now Malaysia)
- Party: United Malays National Organisation (UMNO)
- Other political affiliations: Barisan Nasional (BN)
- Children: 5
- Education: Syracuse University
- Occupation: Politician

Mohd Shamsudin bin Lias (Jawi: محمد شامس الدين لياس, Malay pronunciation: [mohamad shamsudin]; born 15 December 1953) is a Malaysian politician who served as the Leader of the Opposition of Selangor from June 2013 to his resignation in December 2014 and Member of the Selangor State Legislative Assembly (MLA) for Sungai Burong from March 2004 to August 2023. He is a member of the United Malays National Organisation (UMNO), a component party of the Barisan Nasional (BN) coalition.

== Personal life ==
He is married with 5 children. He is currently living with his family in Tanjong Karang, Selangor Darul Ehsan.

== Education ==
Shamsudin has a master's degree in Urban and Regional planning from Syracuse University in New York State, USA.

== Chairman of the Public Accounts Committee ==
In 2010, Shamsudin was appointed as Chairman of the Public Accounts Committee (PAC) even though the state of Selangor was governed by Pakatan Rakyat (PR) and he was a member of Barisan Nasional (BN) which was opposing PR. He was praised by the former Menteri Besar of Selangor from PR, Khalid Ibrahim by saying that "Mohd Shamsudin is a capable person as he has experience in state administration given his experience as a former district officer". In 2014, he stepped down as the State Opposition Leader as he no longer wanted to helm the PAC, protesting against the lack of representation and power of BN and the Opposition in the committee.

== Election results ==
Selangor State Legislative Assembly
Year	Constituency	Candidate	Votes	Pct	Opponent(s)	Votes	Pct	Ballots cast	Majority	Turnout
2004	N08 Sungai Burong	Mohd Shamsudin Lias (UMNO)	9,321	66.00%	Hasan Mohamed Ali (PAS)	4,801	34.00%	14,395	4,520	78.11%
2008	N08 Sungai Burong	Mohd Shamsudin Lias (UMNO)	8,872	59.01%	Abdul Ghani Samsudin (PAS)	6,162	40.99%	15,403	2,710	81.12%
2013	N08 Sungai Burong	Mohd Shamsudin Lias (UMNO)	11,464	57.56%	Mohamad Judi Sarjo (PAS)	8,451	42.44%	20,271	3,013	89.31%
2018	N08 Sungai Burong	Mohd Shamsudin Lias (UMNO)	8,741	42.69%	Mohd Zamri Mohd Zainuldin (PAS)	6,411	31.31%	20,828	2,330	86.62%
2018	N08 Sungai Burong	Mohd Shamsudin Lias (UMNO)	8,741	42.69%	Mohd Tarmizi Lazim (PPBM)	5,323	26.04%	20,828	2,330	86.62%

== Honours ==
- Selangor
  - Knight Commander of the Order of the Crown of Selangor (DPMS) – Dato' (2007)
  - Companion of the Order of Sultan Salahuddin Abdul Aziz Shah (SSA) (1999)
