= Nurul Syazwani Noh =

Malaysian politician and lawyer

Yang Berhormat Puan Nurul Syazwani Noh MLA

Member of the Selangor State Legislative Assembly for Permatang
- Incumbent
- Assumed office 12 August 2023
- Preceded by: Rozana Zainal Abidin (PH–PKR)
- Majority: 1,728 (2023)

Personal details
- Born: Nurul Syazwani binti Noh; 1988 (age 37–38) Malaysia
- Citizenship: Malaysian
- Party: United Malays National Organisation (UMNO) (–2023); Malaysian United Indigenous Party (BERSATU) (since 2023)
- Other political affiliations: Barisan Nasional (BN) (–2023); Perikatan Nasional (PN) (since 2023)
- Spouse: Hisyam Hedzril Nor Hashim (m. 2014)
- Relations: Mohd Jusnaidi Omar (uncle); Muhammad Nur Isyraff (younger half-brother)
- Children: 4 (including Qal Qadri)
- Parent(s): Noh Omar (father); Aishah Salleh (mother); Nooraisha Farizan (stepmother); Sulaiman Abdul Razak (stepfather)
- Education: Brickfields Asia College (Legal Practice Certificate); Universiti Teknologi MARA (Bachelor of Laws); Victoria University, Australia (Master of Business and Administration); MAHSA University (Doctor of Philosophy in Business Administration)
- Occupation: Politician
- Profession: Lawyer

Nurul Syazwani binti Noh (born 1988) is a Malaysian politician and lawyer who has served as Member of the Selangor State Legislative Assembly (MLA) for Permatang since August 2023. She is a member of the Malaysian United Indigenous Party (BERSATU), a component party of the Perikatan Nasional (PN) coalition and was a member of the United Malays National Organisation (UMNO), a component party of the Barisan Nasional (BN) coalition. She is the State Head of Women, Family, Welfare and Unity Bureau of PN of Selangor and Division Women Youth Chief of BERSATU of Tanjong Karang and was a Member of Committee (AJK) of UMNO. She is also the only child and daughter of former Cabinet minister and former Member of Parliament (MP) for Tanjong Karang Noh Omar and Professor of the Institute of Biological Sciences, Faculty of Science, University of Malaya Aishah Salleh and the sole female Selangor PN MLA as well as the sole female PN candidate in the 2023 Selangor state election.

== Political career ==
=== Member of the Selangor State Legislative Assembly (since 2023) ===
==== 2023 Selangor state election ====
In the 2023 Selangor state election, Nurul Syazwani made her electoral debut after being nominated by PN to contest the Permatang state seat. Nurul Syazwani won the seat and was elected to the Selangor State Legislative Assembly as the Permatang MLA for the first term after narrowly defeating Mohd Yahya Mat Sahri of Pakatan Harapan (PH) by a majority of only 1,728 votes.

As the Permatang MLA, Nurul Syazwani made taking care of the welfare of the Permatang people, raising the quality of education and growing more entrepreneurs in Permatang her priorities. She also made establishing Permatang as a PN electoral stronghold and preserving the good name of her father as the Tanjong Karang MP one of her most important duties. She also added that she would try her best to serve Permatang as well as or better than the service of her father as the Tanjong Karang MP. In addition, she described her victory as a heavy responsibility to protect and help the people.

== Election results ==
Selangor State Legislative Assembly
| Year | Constituency | Candidate | Votes | Pct | Opponent(s) | Votes | Pct | Ballots cast | Majority | Turnout |
|---|---|---|---|---|---|---|---|---|---|---|
| 2023 | N09 Permatang | Nurul Syazwani Noh (BERSATU) | 12,850 | 53.60% | Mohd Yahya Mat Sahri (PKR) | 11,122 | 46.40% | 23,972 | 1,728 | 77.84% |
