= Abdul Hamid Othman =

Malaysian politician

Yang Berbahagia Tan Sri Dr. Abdul Hamid Othman PSM SPDK DHMS DSDK SIMP JSM KMN

Religious Advisor to Prime Minister
- In office 2001–2008
- Prime Minister: Mahathir Mohamad; Abdullah Ahmad Badawi

Minister in the Prime Minister's Department
- In office 1995–2001
- Preceded by: Mohd Yusof Noor
- Succeeded by: Abdul Hamid Zainal Abidin

Senator
- In office 1999–2001

Deputy Minister in the Prime Minister's Department
- In office 1990–1995
- Preceded by: Mohd Yusof Noor
- Succeeded by: Fauzi Abdul Rahman

Member of the Malaysian Parliament for Sik
- In office 1990–1999
- Preceded by: Zainol Abidin Johari
- Succeeded by: Shahnon Ahmad

Director General of Islamic Affairs Division of the Prime Minister's Department
- In office 1984–1990
- Preceded by: Mohd Yunus Lahadi
- Succeeded by: Zainal Abidin Abdul Kadir

Personal details
- Born: Abdul Hamid bin Othman; 21 July 1939 Kampung Kemelong, Mukim Sik, Kedah
- Died: 23 December 2011 (aged 72)
- Resting place: Tanah Perkuburan Islam Kampung Bohol, Jalan Klang Lama, Kuala Lumpur
- Party: UMNO
- Spouse: Puan Sri Jamilah Mohd Said
- Relations: Takiyuddin Hassan (nephew)
- Children: Wafi Nazrin Abdul Hamid
- Occupation: Politicians, Religious figure

Tan Sri Abdul Hamid bin Othman (July 21, 1939 - December 23, 2011) was a minister in the Prime Minister's Department. He was appointed in 2001 as a Religious Advisor to the then Prime Minister Dr Mahathir Mohamad and later as Religious Advisor to Prime Minister Tun Abdullah Ahmad Badawi from 2005 to 2009. Several parties recognized him as UMNO scholar and made a winding-up speech during the UMNO General Assembly.

== Early days ==
Abdul Hamid was born on 21 July 1939 in Kampung Kemelong, Mukim Sik, Kedah.

== Education ==
Abdul Hamid was the first recipient of the Malaysian government scholarship to study at Al-Azhar University, Egypt, with four other students in the degree of Bachelor of Islamic Law in 1961.

== Personal life ==
His wife, Puan Sri Jamilah Mohd Said (68) and they have a child, Wafi Nazrin and five grandchildren. The first grandson is named Kaliff Akhyar. They settled in Taman Tenaga, Batu 9, Jalan Puchong, Selangor.

== Career ==
He was appointed the Director General, Islamic Affairs Division, Malaysia Islamic Center in the Prime Minister's Department. Later, he was entrusted as Minister in the Prime Minister's Department (1995-1999). In 1990, he was appointed Deputy Minister in the Prime Minister's Department. In 2001, Abdul Hamid was appointed Religious Advisor to the Prime Minister, Tun Dr. Mahathir Mohamad and then Religious Adviser to the Prime Minister, Tun Abdullah Ahmad Badawi (2005-2009). [1]

== Upon retirement ==
Upon his retirement, he became Counselor Maju Holdings Sdn Bhd. He is also the Honorary Secretary-General of the Malaysian Islamic Welfare Organization (PERKIM) and the General Adviser to the Women and Family Welfare Center (Kewaja).

== Elections ==
In the 1995 Malaysian General Election, he won in the parliamentary constituency P013 - Sik, Kedah.

In the November 29 election, he lost to contesting Prof. Datuk Dr. Shahnon Ahmad (PAS) who competed for the first time, Dr Abdul Hamid obtained 13,026 votes while Shahnon won 13,504 votes. Hence, his position as Minister in the Prime Minister's Department until 1999 alone. Currently, BN / UMNO faces the wave of reforms led by Datuk Seri Anwar Ibrahim who was sacked in 1998. Two State Legislative Assemblies in Sik, Belantek and Jeneri, have also missed PAS.

Subsequently, he was appointed Senator in the House of Representatives to enable him to re-occupy the cabinet. His appointment as senator ends after six years. His vacancy was filled by religious figure, Brigadier Datuk Abdul Hamid Zainal Abidin who was appointed Senator.

In 1999, the Belantek DUN, Sik was also won by PAS candidate Mohd Isa Shafie with a majority of 492 votes defeating BN candidate Siti Meriam Salleh while in Jeneri, PAS representative Yahya Abdullah won with a 393 majority defeating BN candidate Mohd Hadzir Mohd Jaafar.

== Death ==
On December 23, 2011, Tan Sri Dr. Abdul Hamid Othman (72) died after stroke / stroke at his office in Maju Junction and was buried at the Bohol Village Muslim Cemetery, Jalan Klang Lama, Kuala Lumpur. His body was bathed in his home in Taman Tenaga, Puchong, Selangor. Later, his corpse was prayed at the Al-Amin Mosque with the emblem of the National Mosque Imam Besar Tan Sri Sheikh Ismail Muhammad.

Also to visit is Malaysia's Prime Minister, Datuk Seri Najib Tun Razak; former Prime Minister Tun Dr Mahathir Mohamad; and Tun Dr Siti Hasmah Mohamad Ali. Also present were Chairman of Permodalan Nasional Berhad, Tun Ahmad Sarji Abdul Hamid; Malaysia Islamic Development Department director-general Datuk Othman Mustapha and former PAS commissioner Datuk Dr Hasan Mohamed Ali. [2]

== Honour ==
- Malaysia
  - Officer of the Order of the Defender of the Realm (KMN) (1981)
  - Companion of the Order of Loyalty to the Crown of Malaysia (JSM) (1984)
  - Commander of the Order of Loyalty to the Crown of Malaysia (PSM) – Tan Sri (2001)
- Kedah
  - Knight Companion of the Order of Loyalty to the Royal House of Kedah (DSDK) – Dato' (1987)
  - Knight Commander of the Order of Loyalty to Sultan Abdul Halim Mu'adzam Shah (DHMS) – Dato' Paduka (1999)
- Pahang
  - Grand Knight of the Order of the Crown of Pahang (SIMP) – Formerly Dato', now Dato' Indera (1998)
- Sabah
  - Grand Commander of the Order of Kinabalu (SPDK) – Datuk Seri Panglima (2000)

== See also ==
- 1994 Malacca rape scandal
