= Parit Buntar (federal constituency) =

Federal constituency in Perak, Malaysia

Parit Buntar (P057)
Perak constituency

Federal constituency
- Legislature: Dewan Rakyat
- MP: Mohd Misbahul Munir Masduki; PN
- Constituency created: 1974
- First contested: 1974
- Last contested: 2022

Demographics
- Population (2020): 73,366
- Electors (2022): 68,502
- Area (km²): 145
- Pop. density (per km²): 506

Parit Buntar is a federal constituency in Kerian District, Perak, Malaysia, that has been represented in the Dewan Rakyat since 1974.

The federal constituency was created in the 1974 redistribution and is mandated to return a single member to the Dewan Rakyat under the first past the post voting system.

== Demographics ==
Ethnic breakdown of Parit Buntar's electorate as of 2022
1. Malay (69.0%)
2. Chinese (25.9%)
3. Indian (5.00%)
4. Other ethnicities (0.10%)

As of 2020, Parit Buntar has a population of 73,366 people.

Age breakdown of Parit Buntar's electorate as of 2022
1. 18–20 (5.55%)
2. 21–29 (19.5%)
3. 30–39 (20.8%)
4. 40–49 (18.6%)
5. 50–59 (16.2%)
6. 60–69 (11.1%)
7. 70–79 (6.01%)
8. 80–89 (1.81%)
9. above 90 (0.41%)
Gender breakdown of Parit Buntar's electorate as of 2022
1. Male (50.0%)
2. Female (50.0%)

== History ==
=== Polling districts ===
According to the federal gazette issued on 31 October 2022, the Parit Buntar constituency is divided into 32 polling districts.

State constituency	Polling Districts	Code	Location
Titi Serong (N08）	Parit Sungai Betul	057/08/01	SK Tanjong Piandang
Titi Serong (N08）	Sungai Labu	057/08/02	SRA Rakyat Sungai Megat Aris Bagan Tiang
Titi Serong (N08）	Sungai Megat Aris	057/08/03	SK Sungai Megat Aris
Titi Serong (N08）	Sungai Kota	057/08/04	SK Sungai Megat Aris
Titi Serong (N08）	Kedai Empat	057/08/05	SK Haji Ramli
Titi Serong (N08）	Sungai Star	057/08/06	SK Sungai Star
Titi Serong (N08）	Kampong Perak	057/08/07	SK Titi Serong
Titi Serong (N08）	Kampong Kedah	057/08/08	SK Kampong Kedah
Titi Serong (N08）	Parit Buntar	057/08/09	SK Sri Kerian
Titi Serong (N08）	Seri Tenggara	057/08/10	SK Baru Parit Buntar
Titi Serong (N08）	Jalan Kedah	057/08/11	SK Wawasan
Titi Serong (N08）	Taman Kerian	057/08/12	SMK Sri Perak
Titi Serong (N08）	Titi Serong	057/08/13	SMA Al-Tahzib
Titi Serong (N08）	Tebok Haji Musa	057/08/14	Pusat Kecermelangan Padi Jabatan Pertanian Titi Serong
Titi Serong (N08）	Parit Tok Ngah	057/08/15	SMA Al Falah
Kuala Kurau (N09)	Tanjong Piandang	057/09/01	SMK Raja Lope Nor Rashid
Kuala Kurau (N09)	Piandang Indah	057/09/02	SJK (C) Nam Hua
Kuala Kurau (N09)	Parit Sungai Burong	057/09/03	SMA Shamsul Maarif Al Wataniah
Kuala Kurau (N09)	Parit Tok Hin	057/09/04	SK Telok Pial
Kuala Kurau (N09)	Sungai Baharu	057/09/05	SK Sungai Baharu
Kuala Kurau (N09)	Batu 14	057/09/06	SMK Kuala Kurau
Kuala Kurau (N09)	Coast Road	057/09/07	SK Kuala Kurau (Baru)
Kuala Kurau (N09)	Jalan Bawah	057/09/08	Taman Didekan Kanak-Kanak Yu Chai
Kuala Kurau (N09)	Parit Abas	057/09/09	SMA Al-Hidayah
Kuala Kurau (N09)	Kuala Kurau	057/09/10	SJK (C) Yu Chai
Kuala Kurau (N09)	Kurau Indah	057/09/11	SK Kuala Kurau
Kuala Kurau (N09)	Simpang Tiga	057/09/12	SK Sri Siakap
Kuala Kurau (N09)	Siakap Road	057/09/13	Pertubuhan Perladangan Kawasan Kuala Kurau
Kuala Kurau (N09)	Parit Telok Pial	057/09/14	SK Sungai Burong
Kuala Kurau (N09)	Parit Haji Wahab	057/09/15	SK Parit Hj Wahab
Kuala Kurau (N09)	Parit Haji Abd. Rahman	057/09/16	Madrasah Al-Islamiah Addiniah
Kuala Kurau (N09)	Parit Haji Ali	057/09/17	SRA Rakyat Al-Ihyaa Al-Diniyyah

=== Representation history ===
Members of Parliament for Parit Buntar
Parliament	No	Years	Member	Party	Vote Share
Constituency created, renamed from Krian Larut
4th	P046	1974–1978	Sulaiman Taib (سليمان طائب)	BN (UMNO)	12,134; 53.79%
5th	P046	1978–1982	Idris Abdul Rauf (إدريس عبدالرؤوف)	BN (UMNO)	12,437; 51.85%
6th	P046	1982–1986	Abdul Rahman Suliman (عبدالرحمن سليمان)	BN (UMNO)	16,758; 59.32%
7th	P051	1986–1990	Abdul Rahman Suliman (عبدالرحمن سليمان)	BN (UMNO)	11,029; 42.61%
8th	P051	1990–1995	Abdul Rahman Suliman (عبدالرحمن سليمان)	BN (UMNO)	14,113; 50.09%
9th	P054	1995–1999	Abdul Rahman Sulaiman (عبدالرحمٰن سليمان)	BN (UMNO)	17,180; 59.42%
10th	P054	1999–2004	Hasan Mohamed Ali (حسن محمد علي)	BA (PAS)	15,931; 53.52%
11th	P057	2004–2008	Abdul Hamid Zainal Abidin (عبدالحميد زين العابدين)	BN (UMNO)	19,312; 56.91%
12th	P057	2008–2013	Mujahid Yusof Rawa (مجاهد يوسف راوا)	PR (PAS)	21,221; 60.82%
13th	P057	2013–2015	Mujahid Yusof Rawa (مجاهد يوسف راوا)	PR (PAS)	26,015; 59.73%
13th	P057	2015–2018	Mujahid Yusof Rawa (مجاهد يوسف راوا)	AMANAH	26,015; 59.73%
14th	P057	2018–2022	Mujahid Yusof Rawa (مجاهد يوسف راوا)	PH (AMANAH)	16,573; 39.22%
15th	P057	2022–present	Mohd Misbahul Munir Masduki (محمد مصباح المنير مصدوقي)	PN (PAS)	23,223; 43.90%

=== State constituency ===
Parliamentary constituency	State constituency						
Parliamentary constituency	1955–1959*	1959–1974	1974–1986	1986–1995	1995–2004	2004–2018	2018–present
Parit Buntar			Kuala Kurau				
Parit Buntar			Simpang Lima				
Parit Buntar				Titi Serong			

=== Historical boundaries ===
State Constituency	Area				
State Constituency	1974	1984	1994	2003	2018
Kuala Kurau	Kampung Parit Abu Samah; Parit Haji Wahab; Simpang Tiga; Tanjung Piandang; Teluk Pial	Kampung Parit Abu Samah; Kuala Kurau; Simpang Tiga; Tanjung Piandang; Teluk Pial			Kuala Kurau; Parit Haji Wahab; Simpang Tiga; Tanjung Piandang; Teluk Pial
Simpang Lima	Bagan Tiang; Parit Buntar; Parit Wahab; Simpang Lima; Titi Serong				
Titi Serong		Bagan Tiang; Parit Buntar; Parit Wahab; Sungai Kota; Titi Serong			Bagan Tiang; Parit Buntar; Parit Tok Ngah; Sungai Kota; Titi Serong

=== Current state assembly members ===
No.	State Constituency	Member	Coalition (Party)
N08	Titi Serong	Hakimi Hamzi Mohd Hayat	PN (PAS)
N09	Kuala Kurau	Abdul Yunus Jamahri	PN (BERSATU)

=== Local governments & postcodes ===
No.	State Constituency	Local Government	Postcode
N08	Titi Serong	Kerian District Council	34200 Parit Buntar; 34250 Tanjong Piandang; 34300 Bagan Serai; 34350 Kuala Kurau
N09	Kuala Kurau	Kerian District Council	34200 Parit Buntar; 34250 Tanjong Piandang; 34300 Bagan Serai; 34350 Kuala Kurau

== Election results ==
Malaysian general election, 2022
Party	Candidate	Votes	%	∆%
PN	Mohd Misbahul Munir Masduki	23,223	43.90	▲43.90
PH	Mujahid Yusof Rawa	17,828	33.70	▼5.52
BN	Imran Mohd Yusof	11,593	21.91	▼10.05
GTA	Rohijas Md Sharif	259	0.49	▲0.49
Total valid votes		52,903	100.00	
Total rejected ballots		592		
Unreturned ballots		101		
Turnout		53,596	77.23	▼6.35
Registered electors		68,502		
Majority		5,395	10.20	▲2.95
PN gain from PH		Swing		?
Source(s) https://lom.agc.gov.my/ilims/upload/portal/akta/outputp/1753277/PUB610%20PARLIMEN%20PERAK.pdf

Malaysian general election, 2018
Party	Candidate	Votes	%	∆%
PH	Mujahid Yusof Rawa	16,753	39.22	▲39.22
BN	Abdul Puhat Mat Nayan	13,655	31.96	▼8.31
PAS	Ahmad Azhar Sharin	12,312	28.82	▼30.91
Total valid votes		42,720	100.00	
Total rejected ballots		536		
Unreturned ballots		91		
Turnout		43,347	83.58	▼2.58
Registered electors		51,860		
Majority		3,098	7.25	▼12.21
PH gain from PAS		Swing		?
Source(s) "His Majesty's Government Gazette - Notice of Contested Election, Parliament for the State of Perak [P.U. (B) 237/2018]" (PDF). Attorney General's Chambers of Malaysia. 3 May 2018. "Federal Government Gazette - Results of Contested Election and Statements of the Poll after the Official Addition of Votes, Parliamentary Constituencies for the State of Perak [P.U. (B) 311/2018]" (PDF). Attorney General's Chambers of Malaysia. 28 May 2018.

Malaysian general election, 2013
Party	Candidate	Votes	%	∆%
PAS	Mujahid Yusof Rawa	26,015	59.73	▼1.09
BN	Mua'amar Ghadafi Jamal Jamaludin	17,539	40.27	▲1.09
Total valid votes		43,554	100.00	
Total rejected ballots		618		
Unreturned ballots		134		
Turnout		44,306	86.16	▲7.45
Registered electors		51,422		
Majority		8,476	19.46	▼2.18
PAS hold		Swing		
Source(s) "Federal Government Gazette - Notice of Contested Election, Parliament for the State of Perak [P.U. (B) 174/2013]" (PDF). Attorney General's Chambers of Malaysia. 26 April 2013. Archived from the original (PDF) on December 29, 2019. "Federal Government Gazette - Results of Contested Election and Statements of the Poll after the Official Addition of Votes, Parliamentary Constituencies for the State of Perak [P.U. (B) 215/2013]" (PDF). Attorney General's Chambers of Malaysia. 22 May 2013.

Malaysian general election, 2008
Party	Candidate	Votes	%	∆%
PAS	Mujahid Yusof	21,221	60.82	▲17.73
BN	Abdul Raman Suliman	13,670	39.18	▼17.73
Total valid votes		34,891	100.00	
Total rejected ballots		618		
Unreturned ballots		83		
Turnout		35,592	78.71	▲1.55
Registered electors		45,219		
Majority		7,551	21.64	▲7.82
PAS gain from BN		Swing		?

Malaysian general election, 2004
Party	Candidate	Votes	%	∆%
BN	Abdul Hamid Ngah @ Zainal Abidin	19,312	56.91	▲10.43
PAS	Hasan Mohamed Ali	14,623	43.09	▼10.43
Total valid votes		33,935	100.00	
Total rejected ballots		591		
Unreturned ballots		41		
Turnout		34,567	77.16	▼5.24
Registered electors		44,799		
Majority		4,689	13.82	▲6.78
BN gain from PAS		Swing		?

Malaysian general election, 1999
Party	Candidate	Votes	%	∆%
PAS	Hasan Mohamed Ali	15,931	53.52	▲12.94
BN	Abdul Raman Suliman	13,837	46.48	▼12.94
Total valid votes		29,768	100.00	
Total rejected ballots		630		
Unreturned ballots		76		
Turnout		30,474	71.92	▼0.97
Registered electors		42,372		
Majority		2,094	7.04	▼11.80
PAS gain from BN		Swing		?

Malaysian general election, 1995
Party	Candidate	Votes	%	∆%
BN	Abdul Raman Sulaiman	17,180	59.42	▲9.33
S46	Idris Abdul Rauf	11,731	40.58	▼9.33
Total valid votes		28,911	100.00	
Total rejected ballots		1,133		
Unreturned ballots		79		
Turnout		30,123	70.95	▼3.42
Registered electors		42,456		
Majority		5,449	18.84	▲15.54
BN hold		Swing		

Malaysian general election, 1990
Party	Candidate	Votes	%	∆%
BN	Abdul Raman Suliman	14,113	50.09	▲7.48
S46	Idris Abdul Rauf	13,267	47.09	▲47.09
Independent	Jaafar Ali	796	2.82	▲2.82
Total valid votes		28,176	100.00	
Total rejected ballots		892		
Unreturned ballots		0		
Turnout		29,068	74.37	▲2.91
Registered electors		39,086		
Majority		846	3.00	▼1.57
BN hold		Swing		

Malaysian general election, 1986
Party	Candidate	Votes	%	∆%
BN	Abdul Raman Suliman	11,029	42.61	▼16.71
PAS	Ahmad Subki Abd. Latif @ Subky Abd. Latif	9,846	38.04	▼2.64
DAP	Lim Yan Chiow	5,011	19.35	▲19.35
Total valid votes		25,886	100.00	
Total rejected ballots		648		
Unreturned ballots		0		
Turnout		26,534	71.46	▼5.00
Registered electors		37,132		
Majority		1,183	4.57	▼14.07
BN hold		Swing		

Malaysian general election, 1982
Party	Candidate	Votes	%	∆%
BN	Abdul Raman Suliman	16,758	59.32	▲7.47
PAS	Ahmad Hassan Salahuddin Mohamed Khalil	11,492	40.68	▲40.68
Total valid votes		28,250	100.00	
Total rejected ballots		973		
Unreturned ballots		0		
Turnout		29,223	76.46	▼0.24
Registered electors		38,219		
Majority		5,266	18.64	▲8.42
BN hold		Swing		

Malaysian general election, 1978
Party	Candidate	Votes	%	∆%
BN	Idris Abdul Rauf	12,437	51.85	▼1.94
DAP	Tan Hee Pau @ Tan Kee Pow	9,985	41.63	▲41.63
Independent	Shaarani Mohamad	1,564	6.52	▲6.52
Total valid votes		23,986	100.00	
Total rejected ballots		2,852		
Unreturned ballots		0		
Turnout		26,838	76.70	▲1.16
Registered electors		34,991		
Majority		2,452	10.22	▲2.64
BN hold		Swing		

Malaysian general election, 1974
Party	Candidate	Votes	%
BN	Sulaiman Taib	12,134	53.79
Independent	Zulkarnain Ahmad	10,425	46.21
Total valid votes		22,559	100.00
Total rejected ballots		1,413	
Unreturned ballots		0	
Turnout		23,972	75.54
Registered electors		31,734	
Majority		1,709	7.58
This was a new constituency created.
