= Jalur Tiga =

Jalur Tiga JATI Three Stripes
- Founded: 2012
- Founder: Datuk Hasan Mohd Ali
- Type: Non-profit; NGO
- Location: Selangor
- Region served: Malaysia
- Services: Defending the position of the Islam religion, Malay race and Malay rulers.
- Fields: Politic
- Key people: Datuk Hasan Mohd Ali (Founder), Prof Datuk Dr Mohd Zainul Fithri (President)
- Website: jatimalaysia.org

Jalur Tiga or JATI (Malay for "Three Stripes") is a non-profit organisation (NGO) that was formed by Datuk Hasan Mohd Ali, the ex-Selangor State Commissioner of the Pan-Malaysian Islamic Party (PAS) after his dismissal from the party and the ex-Selangor State EXCO in January 2012. JATI objectives focus on defending the Islam religion, Malay dominance and Malay Rulers. JATI was officially formed on 21 February 2012 and aim to work together with Perkasa, another conservative, extreme-right, ethnic Malay NGO, led by its president Ibrahim Ali and other NGOs to be a 'third force' to balance the power of Barisan Nasional and Pakatan Rakyat in facing the 2013 Malaysian general election.
