= Mohd Zamri Mohd Zainuldin =

Malaysian politician

Yang Berhormat Tuan Dr. Mohd Zamri Mohd Zainuldin MLA
- محمد زمري زين الدين

Member of the Selangor State Legislative Assembly for Sungai Burong
- Incumbent
- Assumed office 12 August 2023
- Preceded by: Mohd Shamsudin Lias (BN–UMNO)
- Majority: 6,842 (2023)

Personal details
- Born: Mohd Zamri bin Mohd Zainuldin; 1 November 1979 (age 46) Tanjong Karang, Selangor, Malaysia
- Party: Malaysian Islamic Party (PAS)
- Other political affiliations: Gagasan Sejahtera (GS); Perikatan Nasional (PN)
- Spouse: Mustazzila Mustahkim
- Children: 3
- Occupation: Politician

Mohd Zamri bin Mohd Zainuldin (born 1 November 1979) is a Malaysian politician who has served as Member of the Selangor State Legislative Assembly (MLA) for Sungai Burong since August 2023. He is a member of Malaysian Islamic Party (PAS), a component party of the Perikatan Nasional (PN) coalition.

== Election results ==
Selangor State Legislative Assembly
Year	Constituency	Candidate	Votes	Pct	Opponent(s)	Votes	Pct	Ballots cast	Majority	Turnout
2018	N08 Sungai Burong	Mohd Zamri Mohd Zainuldin (PAS)	6,411	31.31%	Mohd Shamsudin Lias (UMNO)	8,741	42.69%	20,828	2,330	86.62%
2018	N08 Sungai Burong	Mohd Zamri Mohd Zainuldin (PAS)	6,411	31.31%	Mohd Tarmizi Lazim (BERSATU)	5,323	26.00%	20,828	2,330	86.62%
2023	N08 Sungai Burong	Mohd Zamri Mohd Zainuldin (PAS)	15,447	64.22%	Mohamad Khir Ramli (UMNO)	8,605	35.78%	24,191	6,842	76.28%

== See also ==
- Sungai Burong (state constituency)
