= Hasan Mohamed Ali =

Malaysian politician

Yang Berbahagia Dato' Hasan Mohamed Ali DPMS DIMP
- حسن محمد علي
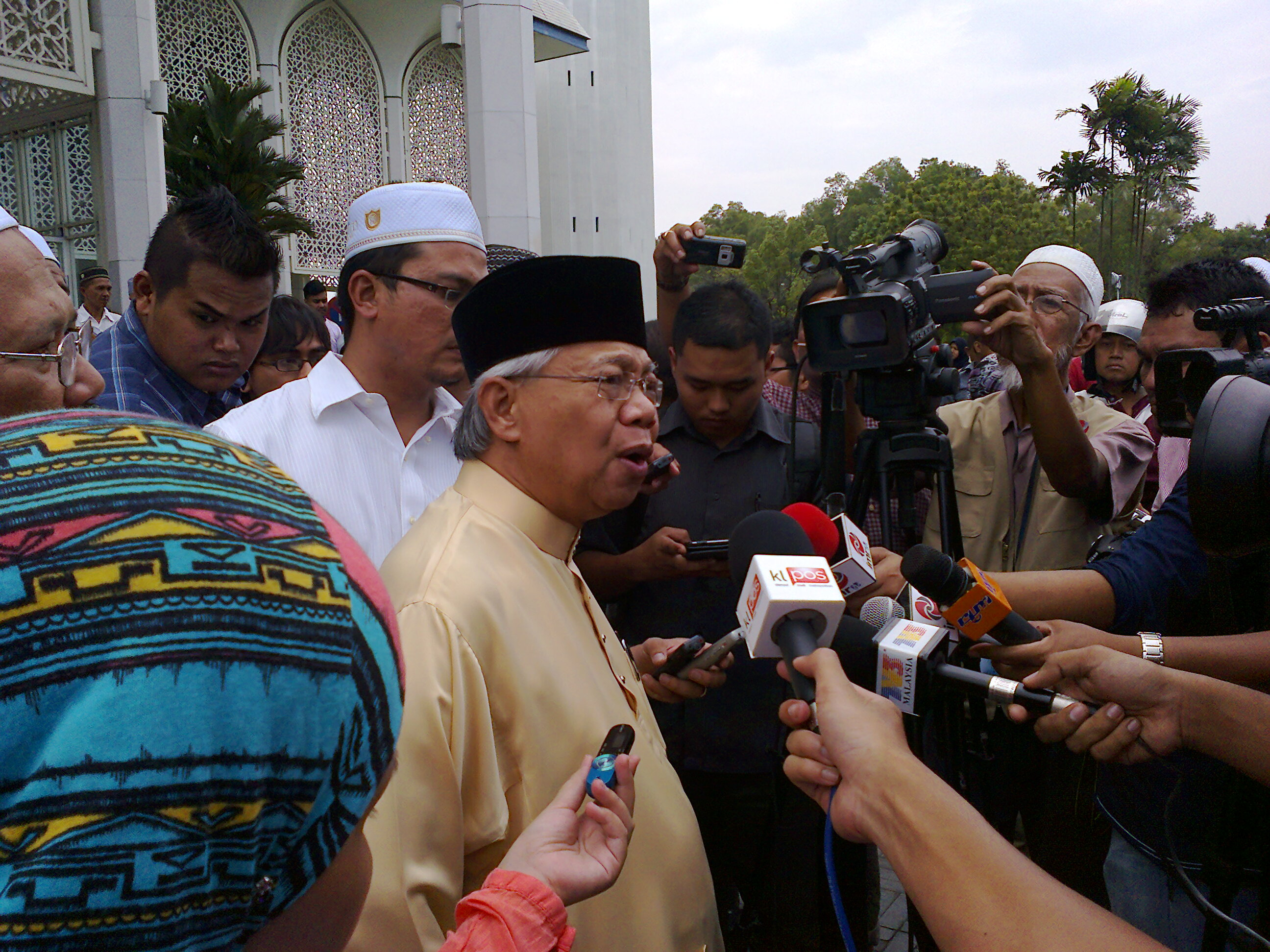

Member of the Selangor State Executive Council (Islamic Affairs, Malay Customs, Infrastructure and Public Amenities)
- In office 25 March 2008 – 8 January 2012
- Monarch: Sharafuddin
- Menteri Besar: Abdul Khalid Ibrahim
- Preceded by: Abdul Rahman Palil (Islamic Affairs, Infrastructure and Public Amenities); Abdul Fatah Iskandar (Malay Customs)
- Succeeded by: Abdul Khalid Ibrahim (Islamic Affairs, Infrastructure and Public Amenities); Ahmad Yunus Hairi (Malay Customs)
- Constituency: Gombak Setia

Member of the Malaysian Parliament for Parit Buntar
- In office 29 November 1999 – 21 March 2004
- Preceded by: Abdul Rahman Sulaiman (BN–UMNO)
- Succeeded by: Abdul Hamid Zainal Abidin (BN–UMNO)
- Majority: 2,094 (1999)

Member of the Selangor State Legislative Assembly for Gombak Setia
- In office 8 March 2008 – 5 May 2013
- Preceded by: Yuszahari Mohd Yusoff (BN–UMNO)
- Succeeded by: Hasbullah Mohd Ridzwan (PR–PAS)
- Majority: 2,797 (2008)

Member of the Selangor State Legislative Assembly for Sungai Burung
- In office 29 November 1999 – 21 March 2004
- Preceded by: Mohd Aini Taib (BN–UMNO)
- Succeeded by: Mohd Shamsudin Lias (BN–UMNO)
- Majority: 91 (1999)

Personal details
- Born: Hasan bin Mohamed Ali; 28 November 1947 (age 78) Klang, Selangor, Malayan Union (now Malaysia)
- Citizenship: Malaysian
- Party: Malaysian Islamic Party (PAS) (until 2012)
- Other political affiliations: Barisan Alternatif (BA) (1999-2004); Pakatan Rakyat (PR) (2008-2012)
- Occupation: Politician

Hasan bin Mohamed Ali (variant spellings include Hassan Mohd Ali, born 28 November 1947) is a Malaysian politician and formerly the State Assemblyman for Gombak Setia in Selangor. He was a member of the Pan-Malaysian Islamic Party (PAS) and the Selangor State EXCO until his dismissal in January 2012.

== Early life and career ==
Born in the town of Klang, Hasan graduated from the University of Malaya in 1971 and obtained his PhD from the University of Wisconsin–Madison in 1985. Before entering politics, he was a member of the public service nearly 20 years, and served various positions in the Selangor state government and Prime Minister's Department. He has also appeared as a panel member for various talk shows aired on RTM and TV3.

== Political career ==
Hasan joined the Pan-Malaysian Islamic Party (PAS) after leaving public service and subsequently became a vice-president in 2001. He was elected a central working committee member in 2009 and was the party's leader in Selangor until 2011.

In the 1999 general elections, Hasan contested two seats: the Sungai Burung state seat in Selangor and the Parit Buntar parliamentary seat in Perak, and won both. However, he lost both of them in the next elections, as PAS suffered heavy losses throughout the nation.

In 2008, Hasan won the Gombak Setia state seat in Selangor. PAS went on to form a coalition government with Parti Keadilan Rakyat and the Democratic Action Party, and Hasan was appointed as a state executive councillor (EXCO), holding the Islamic Affairs, Malay Customs, Infrastructure and Public Amenities portfolio. During his tenure, Hasan openly criticised the state government on a few occasions, and was accused of harbouring ambitions of becoming Menteri Besar of Selangor himself. In 2011, he broke ranks with the Pakatan Rakyat state government again after speaking out in support of a raid on a church event.

In December 2011, Hasan criticised PAS in UMNO-owned media for purportedly abandoning its Islamist credentials. On 8 January 2012, the PAS central working committee sacked Hasan from the party for "persistently going against its stand." He was also dismissed from the state EXCO. After his dismissal, he officially founded Jalur Tiga (JATI) a non-profit organisation (NGO) on the pretext of defending the Islam religion, Malay dominance and Malay Rulers, for the movement did not catch on.

== Election results ==
Selangor State Legislative Assembly
Year	Constituency	Candidate	Votes	Pct	Opponent(s)	Votes	Pct	Ballots cast	Majority	Turnout
1999	N06 Sungai Burung	Hasan Mohamed Ali (PAS)	5,591	50.41%	Mohd Aini Taib (UMNO)	5,500	49.59%	11,435	91	73.41%
2004	N08 Sungai Burong	Hasan Mohamed Ali (PAS)	4,801	34.00%	Mohd Shamsudin Lias (UMNO)	9,321	66.00%	14,395	4,520	78.11%
2008	N17 Gombak Setia	Hasan Mohamed Ali (PAS)	14,391	55.38%	Yuszahari Mohd Yusoff (UMNO)	11,594	44.62%	26,726	2,797	76.41%

Parliament of Malaysia
Year	Constituency	Candidate	Votes	Pct	Opponent(s)	Votes	Pct	Ballots cast	Majority	Turnout
1999	P054 Parit Buntar	Hasan Mohamed Ali (PAS)	15,931	53.52%	Abdul Rahman Sulaiman (UMNO)	13,837	46.48%	30,474	2,094	71.92%
2004	P057 Parit Buntar	Hasan Mohamed Ali (PAS)	14,623	43.09%	Abdul Hamid Ngah (UMNO)	19,312	56.91%	34,567	4,689	77.16%

== Honours ==
=== Honours of Malaysia ===
- Pahang
  - Knight Companion of the Order of the Crown of Pahang (DIMP) – Dato' (1995)
- Selangor
  - Knight Commander of the Order of the Crown of Selangor (DPMS) – Dato' (2011)

== See also ==
- Jalur Tiga (JATI)
