= Abdul Hamid Zainal Abidin =

Malaysian politician

Yang Berbahagia Brigadier General (Rtd) Tan Sri Dato' Seri Abdul Hamid Zainal Abidin PSM SPMP DPMP PJN PAT JSM KMN

Chairman of People's Trust Council
- In office 2004–2009
- Preceded by: Zamani b. Md. Noor
- Succeeded by: Idris Jusoh

Minister in the Prime Minister's Department (Religion)
- In office 17 January 2001 – 26 March 2004
- Monarchs: Salahuddin; Sirajuddin
- Prime Minister: Mahathir Mohamad; Abdullah Ahmad Badawi
- Preceded by: Abdul Hamid Othman
- Succeeded by: Abdullah Md Zin

Director General of Department of Islamic Development Malaysia
- In office 1995–2001
- Preceded by: Datuk Haji Zainal Abidin bin Abdul Kadir
- Succeeded by: Mohamad Shahir Abdullah

Personal details
- Born: Abdul Hamid bin Ngah @ Hj. Zainal Abidin; 20 February 1944 Bagan Datuk, Perak, Japanese occupation of Malaya
- Died: 30 December 2014 (aged 70) Institut Jantung Negara, Kuala Lumpur, Malaysia
- Cause of death: Heart attack, shortness of breath
- Party: UMNO
- Spouse: Puan Sri Latifah Abdullah
- Children: 11
- Education: Sekolah Melayu Kampung Tanah Lalang, Bagan Datoh
- Occupation: Politician

Abdul Hamid bin Ngah @ Zainal Abidin (Jawi: عبدالحميد بن ڠه @ زين العابدين; February 20, 1944 – December 30, 2014) is the former chairman of Majlis Amanah Rakyat (MARA) from 16 July 2004 to 2009. He was a member of Parit Buntar Parliament and became Minister in the Prime Minister's Department.

He and Zakir Abdul Karim Naik from India was elected as Tokoh Maal Hijrah 1435/2013M. The award was presented on 5 November 2013 in Putrajaya. The award was given by the Yang di-Pertuan Agong at the Plenary Hall, Putrajaya International Convention Centre (PICC), Putrajaya. Sultan Abdul Halim Mu'adzam Shah presented the award.

== Education ==
Abdul Hamid received education at Kampung Tanah Lalang Village, Bagan Datoh, and Madrasah Irsyadiah, Bt. 26, Bagan Datoh, Perak. Then continue study at Madrasah Alawiah, Arau, Perlis and Malaya Islamic College, Petaling Jaya. Furthermore, they continue to study diploma in education (Islamic College); Master (Al-Azhar University, Cairo, Egypt and Muslim College, London). Also a master's degree in Master of Islamic Law at Takhassus University al Azhar, Egypt.

== Career ==
He was a teacher at Tunku Besar High School, Tampin, Negeri Sembilan (1971–1972); teacher at Victoria Institution, Kuala Lumpur (1972–1977); lecturer of Islamic Studies & Arabic-Islamic Teachers' College, Lembah Pantai (1972–1980); acting head of Department of Islamic Studies and Arabic-Islamic Teachers' College (1980–1981).

Next was senior assistant director of student affairs, Teacher Education Division – Ministry of Education (1982–1983) and Islamic Teachers College, Lembah Pantai, Kuala Lumpur (1984–1985).

When the Malaysian Army Military Religious Corps (KAGAT) – Ministry of Defense was established, he became the first KAGAT director (1985–1995) for 10 years. The then prime minister, Mahathir Mohamad had asked him to join the army when he was 40 years old. He therefore had to undergo military training such as military base training, warheads, weapons and all military protocols. After receiving various training, the Yang di-Pertuan Agong has given his credentials with the rank of colonel and appointed the first KAGAT director. Members of KAGAT can be sent anywhere, including serving under the banner of the United Nations such as Bosnia and Herzegovina and Somalia.

Once again Mahathir appointed him as the first director general, Department of Islamic Development Malaysia (JAKIM) (1995–2001). JAKIM was first established to replace the small unit known as the Islamic Affairs Division of the Prime Minister's Department (BAHEIS) at the Islamic Center. At that time Abdul Hamid was telephoned by Mahathir during his pilgrimage to Mecca. At the same time the Malaysian Syariah Judiciary Department (JKSM) was also established.

In 2001, after 6 years in JAKIM, he was appointed Senator and became Minister in the Prime Minister's Department (2001 – March 2004). The post has been held by Tan Sri Dr Mohd Yusof Noor then Tan Sri Abdul Hamid Othman.

His last position was the Chairman of Majlis Amanah Rakyat (MARA) (16 July 2004 – 2009). He was also chairman of the University of Kuala Lumpur and Pro Chancellor (UniKL).

== Politics ==
He was elected by the prime minister of Malaysia Tun Abdullah Ahmad Badawi to contest the Parit Buntar parliamentary constituency in the 2004 General Elections and defeated his incumbent Datuk Dr Hasan Mohamed Ali. Abdul Hamid received 19,317 votes while Dr Hasan received 14,619 votes. Earlier, Dr Hasan defeated BN-UMNO candidate Abdul Rahman Suliman, a journalist with a majority of 2,094.

Abdul Hamid's victory was also accompanied by a victory of BN-UMNO in Titi Serong state seat and retaining Batu Kurau constituency.

But Abdul Hamid was not elected as a candidate in the 2008 general election. His place was recaptured by Senator Datuk Abdul Rahman Suliman against Dr Mujahid Yusof Rawa. It turned out that the BN-UMNO candidate lost to PAS candidate with a majority of 7,551 votes. In 2013, Datuk Dr Mujahid once again won by defeating Mua'amar Ghadafi Jamal Datuk Wira Jamaludin from BN-UMNO with the majority increasing to 8,476 votes.

== Election results ==
Parliament of Malaysia
| Year | Constituency | Candidate | Votes | Pct | Opponent(s) | Votes | Pct | Ballots cast | Majority | Turnout |
|---|---|---|---|---|---|---|---|---|---|---|
| 2004 | P057 Parit Buntar | Abdul Hamid Zainal Abidin (UMNO) | 19,312 | 56.91% | Hasan Mohamed Ali (PAS) | 14,623 | 43.09% | 34,567 | 4,689 | 77.16% |

== Honours ==
- Malaysia
  - Officer of the Order of the Defender of the Realm (KMN) (1989)
  - Companion of the Order of Loyalty to the Crown of Malaysia (JSM) (1995)
  - Commander of the Order of Meritorious Service (PJN) – Datuk (1999)
  - Commander of the Order of Loyalty to the Crown of Malaysia (PSM) – Tan Sri (2011)
- Malaysian Armed Forces
  - Warrior of the Most Gallant Order of Military Service (PAT) (1991)
- Perak
  - Knight Commander of the Order of the Perak State Crown (DPMP) – Dato' (1991)
  - Knight Grand Commander of the Order of the Perak State Crown (SPMP) – Dato' Seri (2003)

== Death ==
In 2000, Abdul Hamid Zainal Abidin had undergone a cardiac arrest surgery.

On December 30, 2014, he died at the National Heart Institute (IJN), Kuala Lumpur due to shortness of breath and heart attack at the age of 70. The court will be buried at the Bandar Tun Hussein Onn Islamic Cemetery, Cheras.
