= Sungai Burong (state constituency) =

State constituency in Selangor, Malaysia

Sungai Burong (N08)
Selangor constituency

State constituency
- Legislature: Selangor State Legislative Assembly
MLA
Mohd Zamri Mohd Zainuldin
PN
- Constituency created: 1974
- First contested: 1974
- Last contested: 2023

Demographics
- Electors (2023): 31,715

Sungai Burong is a state constituency in Selangor, Malaysia, that has been represented in the Selangor State Legislative Assembly since 1974. It has been represented by Mohd Zamri Mohd Zainuldin of Perikatan Nasional (PN) since 2023.

The state constituency was created in the 1974 redistribution and is mandated to return a single member to the Selangor State Legislative Assembly under the first past the post voting system.

== Demographics ==
Ethnic breakdown of Sungai Burong's electorate as of 2023
1. Malay (83.2%)
2. Chinese (12.9%)
3. Indian (2.54%)
4. Other ethnicities (1.44%)

== History ==
=== Polling districts ===
According to the gazette issued on 30 March 2018, the Sungai Burong constituency has a total of 15 polling districts.

State constituency	Polling districts	Code	Location
Sungai Burong（N08）	Terusan Besar	095/08/01	SK Berjaya Sekinchan
Sungai Burong（N08）	Sawah Sempadan Utara	095/08/02	SA Rakyat (KAFA) Al-Ainiah Blok B 1 & B Sawah Sempadan
Sungai Burong（N08）	Sungai Burong Bendang	095/08/03	SK Parit Empat Sekinchan
Sungai Burong（N08）	Sungai Burong Utara	095/08/04	SRA Batu 12 Tanjong Karang
Sungai Burong（N08）	Sungai Burong Selatan	095/08/05	SK Sungai Burong
Sungai Burong（N08）	Batu 9 Tanjong Karang	095/08/06	SMA Tanjong Karang
Sungai Burong（N08）	Sungai Sireh	095/08/07	SK Sungai Sireh
Sungai Burong（N08）	Sungai Sireh Utara	095/08/08	SK Seri Gambut Tanjong Karang
Sungai Burong（N08）	Sawah Sempadan Selatan	095/08/09	SRA Kunci Air Buang
Sungai Burong（N08）	Sungai Tengi Kanan	095/08/10	SK Dato' Manan Tanjong Karang
Sungai Burong（N08）	Sungai Kajang	095/08/11	SMK Seri Desa Tanjong Karang
Sungai Burong（N08）	Pekan Tanjong Karang	095/08/12	SMK Dato' Harun Tanjong Karang
Sungai Burong（N08）	Batu 7 Tanjong Karang	095/08/13	SK Tanjong Karang
Sungai Burong（N08）	Batu 11 Tanjong Karang	095/08/14	SRA Batu 11, Jalan Bernam Tanjong Karang
Sungai Burong（N08）	Bagan Pasir Tanjong Karang	095/08/15	SJK (C) Yit Khwan Bagan Tanjong Karang

=== Representation history ===
Members of the Legislative Assembly for Sungai Burong
Assembly	No	Years	Member	Party
Constituency created from Tanjong Karang and Kuala Selangor Pekan
Sungei Burong
4th	N06	1974-1978	Kamaruzaman Ahmad	BN (UMNO)
5th	N06	1978-1982	Kamaruzaman Ahmad	BN (UMNO)
6th	N06	1982-1986	Abdul Shukur Siraj	BN (UMNO)
Sungai Burung
7th	N06	1986-1990	Abdul Shukur Siraj	BN (UMNO)
8th	N06	1990-1995	Aziz Mohd Desa	BN (UMNO)
9th	N06	1995-1999	Mohd Aini Taib	BN (UMNO)
10th	N06	1999-2004	Hasan Mohamed Ali	BA (PAS)
Sungai Burong
11th	N08	2004-2008	Mohd Shamsudin Lias	BN (UMNO)
12th	N08	2008-2013	Mohd Shamsudin Lias	BN (UMNO)
13th	N08	2013-2018	Mohd Shamsudin Lias	BN (UMNO)
14th	N08	2018–2023	Mohd Shamsudin Lias	BN (UMNO)
15th	N08	2023–present	Mohd Zamri Mohd Zainuldin	PN (PAS)

== Election results ==
Selangor state election, 2023
Party	Candidate	Votes	%	∆%
PN	Mohd Zamri Mohd Zainuldin	15,447	64.22	▲64.22
BN	Mohamad Khir Ramli	8,605	35.78	▼6.91
Total valid votes		24,054	100.00	
Total rejected ballots		129		
Unreturned ballots		33		
Turnout		24,224	75.84	▼10.78
Registered electors		31,715		
Majority		6,842	28.44	▲17.06
PN gain from BN		Swing		?

Selangor state election, 2018
Party	Candidate	Votes	%	∆%
BN	Mohd Shamsudin Lias	8,741	42.69	▼14.87
PAS	Mohd Zamri Mohd Zainuldin	6,411	31.31	▼11.13
PKR	Mohd Tarmizi Lazim	5,323	26.00	▲26.00
Total valid votes		20,475	100.00	
Total rejected ballots		255		
Unreturned ballots		98		
Turnout		20,828	86.62	▼2.69
Registered electors		24,045		
Majority		2,330	11.38	▼3.74
BN hold		Swing		

Selangor state election, 2013
Party	Candidate	Votes	%	∆%
BN	Mohd Shamsudin Lias	11,464	57.56	▼1.45
PAS	Mohamad Judi Sarjo	8,451	42.44	▲1.45
Total valid votes		19,915	100.00	
Total rejected ballots		304		
Unreturned ballots		52		
Turnout		20,271	89.31	▲8.19
Registered electors		22,697		
Majority		3,013	15.12	▼2.90
BN hold		Swing		
Source(s) "Federal Government Gazette - Notice of Contested Election, State Legislative Assembly for the State of Selangor [P.U. (B) 192/2013]" (PDF). Attorney General's Chambers of Malaysia. 26 April 2013. "Federal Government Gazette - Results of Contested Election and Statements of the Poll after the Official Addition of Votes, State Constituencies for the State of Selangor [P.U. (B) 233/2013]" (PDF). Attorney General's Chambers of Malaysia. 22 May 2013.

Selangor state election, 2008
Party	Candidate	Votes	%	∆%
BN	Mohd Shamsudin Lias	8,872	59.01	▼6.99
PAS	Abdul Ghani Samsudin	6,162	40.99	▲6.99
Total valid votes		15,034	100.00	
Total rejected ballots		336		
Unreturned ballots		33		
Turnout		15,403	81.12	▲3.01
Registered electors		18,988		
Majority		2,710	18.02	▼60.09
BN hold		Swing		

Selangor state election, 2004
Party	Candidate	Votes	%	∆%
BN	Mohd Shamsudin Lias	9,321	66.00	▲16.41
PAS	Hasan Mohamed	4,801	34.00	▼16.41
Total valid votes		14,122	100.00	
Total rejected ballots		273		
Unreturned ballots				
Turnout		14,395	78.11	▲4.70
Registered electors		18,428		
Majority		4,520	32.00	▲31.18
BN gain from National Trust Party (Malaysia)-Malaysian Islamic Party		Swing		?

Selangor state election, 1999: Sungai Burung
Party	Candidate	Votes	%	∆%
PAS	Hasan Mohamed Ali	5,591	50.41	▲50.41
BN	Mohd Aini Taib	5,500	49.59	▲49.59
Total valid votes		11,091	100.00	
Total rejected ballots		339		
Unreturned ballots		5		
Turnout		11,435	73.41	▲73.41
Registered electors		15,577		
Majority		91	0.82	▲0.82
PAS gain from BN		Swing		?

Selangor state election, 1995: Sungai Burung
Party	Candidate	Votes	%	∆%
On the nomination day, Mohd Aini Taib won uncontested.
BN	Mohd Aini Taib			
Total valid votes			100.00	
Total rejected ballots				
Unreturned ballots				
Turnout				
Registered electors		17,106		
Majority				
BN hold		Swing		

Selangor state election, 1990: Sungai Burung
Party	Candidate	Votes	%	∆%
BN	Aziz Mohd Desa	4,515	64.96	▼3.42
S46	Ramli Pembekal	2,435	35.04	▲35.04
Total valid votes		6,950	100.00	
Total rejected ballots		392		
Unreturned ballots		0		
Turnout		7,342	70.98	▲5.72
Registered electors		10,344		
Majority		2,080	29.92	▼6.84
BN hold		Swing		

Selangor state election, 1986: Sungai Burung
Party	Candidate	Votes	%	∆%
BN	Abdul Shukur Siraj	4,103	68.38	▼4.47
PAS	Shaari Said	1,897	31.62	▲4.47
Total valid votes		6,000	100.00	
Total rejected ballots		251		
Unreturned ballots		0		
Turnout		6,251	65.26	▼4.83
Registered electors		9,579		
Majority		2,206	36.77	▼8.93
BN hold		Swing		

Selangor state election, 1982: Sungei Burong
Party	Candidate	Votes	%	∆%
BN	Abdul Shukur Siraj	5,728	72.85	▲7.16
PAS	Khalid Abdul Hamid	2,135	27.15	▼7.16
Total valid votes		7,863	100.00	
Total rejected ballots		325		
Unreturned ballots		0		
Turnout		8,188	70.08	▼1.97
Registered electors		11,683		
Majority		3,593	45.70	▲14.32
BN hold		Swing		

Selangor state election, 1978: Sungei Burong
Party	Candidate	Votes	%	∆%
BN	Kamaruzaman Ahmad	4,740	65.69	▲3.03
PAS	Kamaruddin Ghani	2,476	34.31	▲34.31
Total valid votes		7,216	100.00	
Total rejected ballots		512		
Unreturned ballots		0		
Turnout		7,728	72.06	▲1.56
Registered electors		10,725		
Majority		2,264	31.37	▼0.24
BN hold		Swing		

Selangor state election, 1974: Sungei Burong
Party	Candidate	Votes	%
BN	Kamaruzaman Ahmad	3,590	62.36
Independent	Abdul Rahman Abdul Hamid	1,770	30.75
PEKEMAS	Abdul Hamid Abdul Manan	397	6.90
Total valid votes		5,757	100.00
Total rejected ballots		142	
Unreturned ballots			
Turnout		5,899	71.48
Registered electors		8,253	
Majority		1,820	31.61
This was a new constituency created.
