= Permatang (state constituency) =

State constituency of Malaysia

Permatang (N09)
Selangor constituency

State constituency
- Legislature: Selangor State Legislative Assembly
MLA
Nurul Syazwani Noh
PN
- Constituency created: 1974
- First contested: 1974
- Last contested: 2023

Demographics
- Electors (2023): 30,796

Permatang is a state constituency in the Selangor State Legislative Assembly, located in Selangor, Malaysia. The constituency has existed since 1974. It has been represented by Nurul Syazwani Noh of Perikatan Nasional (PN) since 2023.

The state constituency was created in the 1974 redistribution and is mandated to return a single member to the Selangor State Legislative Assembly under the first past the post voting system.

== Demographics ==
Ethnic breakdown of Permatang's electorate as of 2023
1. Malay (63.2%)
2. Chinese (21.5%)
3. Indian (13.8%)
4. Other ethnicities (1.46%)

== History ==
=== Polling districts ===
According to the gazette issued on 30 March 2018, the Permatang constituency has a total of 19 polling districts.

State constituency	Polling districts	Code	Location
Permatang（N09）	Hulu Tiram Buruk	095/09/01	SK Sri Tiram Tanjong Karang
Permatang（N09）	Hulu Tiram Buruk Utata	095/09/02	Balai Raya Blok Q Sawah Sempadan
Permatang（N09）	Batang Berjuntai Satu	095/09/03	KAFA Integrasi Al Ridzuan Berjuntai Bistari
Permatang（N09）	Ladang Mary	095/09/04	SJK (T) Ladang Mary
Permatang（N09）	Sungai Tinggi	095/09/05	SJK (T) Ladang Sungai Tinggi
Permatang（N09）	Batang Berjuntai Utara	095/09/06	Dewan Seberguna Sime Darby Ladang Tennamaran
Permatang（N09）	Kampung Raja Musa	095/09/07	SK Jalan Raja Musa
Permatang（N09）	Ladang Raja Musa	095/09/08	SJK (T) Ladang Raja Musa
Permatang（N09）	Kampung Baharu Tiram Busuk	095/09/09	SJK (C) Ming Tee Kampung Tiram Buruk Luar
Permatang（N09）	Parit Serong	095/09/10	SK Parit Serong
Permatang（N09）	Sungai Gulang-Gulang	095/09/11	Dewan Orang Ramai Kampong Sungai Gulang-Gulang
Permatang（N09）	Hujung Permatang	095/09/12	SRA Ujung Permatang
Permatang（N09）	Belimbing	095/09/13	SK Bukit Belimbing
Permatang（N09）	Permatang	095/09/14	SK Kuala Selangor
Permatang（N09）	Pasir Penambang	095/09/15	SJK (C) Khai Tee Pasir Penambang
Permatang（N09）	Sungai Yu	095/09/16	SA KAFA Integrasi As-Sulaimiah Kampung Sungai Yu
Permatang（N09）	Sungai Terap	096/09/17	SK Sungai Terap
Permatang（N09）	Sawah Sempadan	096/09/18	Balai Raya Kampung Lubuk Jaya
Permatang（N09）	Kampung Lubuk Jaya	095/09/19	Balai Raya Kampung Lubuk Jaya

=== Representation history ===
Members of the Legislative Assembly for Permatang
Assembly	No	Years	Member	Party
Constituency created from Kuala Selangor Pekan, Tanjong Karang and Serendah
4th	N10	1974-1978	Mohamed Said Bahir	BN (UMNO)
5th	N10	1978-1982	Zaleha Ismail	BN (UMNO)
6th	N10	1982-1986	Khalid Ahmad	BN (UMNO)
7th	N11	1986-1990	Khalid Ahmad	BN (UMNO)
8th	N11	1990-1995	Jamaluddin Adnan	BN (UMNO)
9th	N10	1995-1997	Jamaluddin Adnan	BN (UMNO)
9th	N10	1997-1999	Abu Hassan Omar	BN (UMNO)
10th	N10	1999-2004	Abu Hassan Omar	BN (UMNO)
11th	N09	2004-2008	Abdul Aziz Mohd Noh	BN (UMNO)
12th	N09	2008-2013	Sulaiman Abdul Razak	BN (UMNO)
13th	N09	2013-2018	Sulaiman Abdul Razak	BN (UMNO)
14th	N09	2018–2023	Rozana Zainal Abidin	PH (PKR)
15th	N09	2023–present	Nurul Syazwani Noh	PN (BERSATU)

== Election results ==
Selangor state election, 2023
Party	Candidate	Votes	%	∆%
PN	Nurul Syazwani Noh	12,850	53.60	▲53.60
PH	Mohd Yahya Mat Shari	11,122	46.40	▲0.37
Total valid votes		23,972	100.00	
Total rejected ballots		187		
Unreturned ballots		16		
Turnout		24,175	78.50	▼9.43
Registered electors		30,796		
Majority		1,728	7.20	▲1.41
PN gain from PKR		Swing		?

Selangor state election, 2018
Party	Candidate	Votes	%	∆%
PKR	Rozana Zainal Abidin	9,208	46.03	▼0.76
BN	Sulaiman Haji Abdul Razak	8,050	40.24	▼12.53
PAS	Muhammad Jafarudin Sheik Daud	2,746	13.73	▲13.73
Total valid votes		20,004	100.00	
Total rejected ballots		288		
Unreturned ballots		66		
Turnout		20,358	87.93	▼1.18
Registered electors		23,153		
Majority		1,158	5.79	▼0.19
PH gain from BN		Swing		?

Selangor state election, 2013
Party	Candidate	Votes	%	∆%
BN	Sulaiman Abdul Razak	9,049	52.77	▲0.49
PKR	Mohd Yahya Mat Sahri	8,023	46.79	▼0.93
Independent	Low Tan	76	0.44	▲0.44
Total valid votes		17,148	100.00	
Total rejected ballots		312		
Unreturned ballots		37		
Turnout		17,497	89.11	▲10.69
Registered electors		19,636		
Majority		1,026	5.98	▲1.42
BN hold		Swing		
Source(s) "Federal Government Gazette - Notice of Contested Election, State Legislative Assembly for the State of Selangor [P.U. (B) 192/2013]" (PDF). Attorney General's Chambers of Malaysia. 26 April 2013. Archived from the original (PDF) on 29 December 2019. "Federal Government Gazette - Results of Contested Election and Statements of the Poll after the Official Addition of Votes, State Constituencies for the State of Selangor [P.U. (B) 233/2013]" (PDF). Attorney General's Chambers of Malaysia. 22 May 2013. Archived from the original (PDF) on 2 October 2018.

Selangor state election, 2008
Party	Candidate	Votes	%	∆%
BN	Sulaiman Abdul Razak	6,975	52.28	▼15.00
PKR	Mazlan Hassan	6,367	47.72	▲15.00
Total valid votes		13,342	100.00	
Total rejected ballots		286		
Unreturned ballots		20		
Turnout		13,648	78.42	▲5.08
Registered electors		17,403		
Majority		608	4.56	▼30.0
BN hold		Swing		

Selangor state election, 2004
Party	Candidate	Votes	%	∆%
BN	Abdul Aziz Mohd Noh	8,341	67.28	▲6.93
PKR	Samry Masri	4,056	32.72	▼6.93
Total valid votes		12,397	100.00	
Total rejected ballots		355		
Unreturned ballots		0		
Turnout		12,752	73.34	▼0.38
Registered electors		17,388		
Majority		4,285	34.56	▲13.86
BN hold		Swing		

Selangor state election, 1999
Party	Candidate	Votes	%	∆%
BN	Abu Hassan Omar	8,621	60.35	▼23.77
PKR	Mohd. Yahya Mat Sahri	5,665	39.65	▲39.65
Total valid votes		14,286	100.00	
Total rejected ballots		453		
Unreturned ballots		16		
Turnout		14,755	73.72	▲9.54
Registered electors		20,016		
Majority		2,956	20.70	▼47.54
BN hold		Swing		

Selangor state by-election, 29 May 1997 Upon the resignation of incumbent, Jamaluddin Adnan
Party	Candidate	Votes	%	∆%
BN	Abu Hassan Omar	9,590	84.12	▲4.96
PAS	Mohd Maskuri Mardzuki	1,810	15.88	▼4.96
Total valid votes		11,400	100.00	
Total rejected ballots		484		
Unreturned ballots		22		
Turnout		11,884	64.18	▼6.52
Registered electors		18,517		
Majority		7,780	68.24	▲9.92
BN hold		Swing		

Selangor state election, 1995
Party	Candidate	Votes	%	∆%
BN	Jamaluddin Adnan	9,877	79.16	▲13.96
PAS	Harullah Junid @ Amat Dollah Mat Jonit	2,601	20.84	▲20.84
Total valid votes		12,478	100.00	
Total rejected ballots		575		
Unreturned ballots		57		
Turnout		13,110	70.70	▼4.36
Registered electors		18,543		
Majority		7,276	58.32	▲27.92
BN hold		Swing		

Selangor state election, 1990
Party	Candidate	Votes	%	∆%
BN	Jamaluddin Adnan	6,214	65.20	▼7.81
S46	Hasanudin Latif	3,317	34.80	▲34.80
Total valid votes		9,531	100.00	
Total rejected ballots		484		
Unreturned ballots		10		
Turnout		10,025	75.13	▲4.26
Registered electors		13,343		
Majority		2,897	30.40	▼15.62
BN hold		Swing		

Selangor state election, 1986
Party	Candidate	Votes	%	∆%
BN	Khalid Ahmad	5,674	73.01	▼12.30
PAS	Suarin Ibrahim	2,098	26.99	▲12.30
Total valid votes		7,772	100.00	
Total rejected ballots		327		
Unreturned ballots		0		
Turnout		8,099	70.88	▼2.16
Registered electors		11,427		
Majority		3,576	46.01	▼24.62
BN hold		Swing		

Selangor state election, 1982
Party	Candidate	Votes	%	∆%
BN	Khalid Ahmad	7,935	85.31	▲24.86
PAS	Kormin Shukur	1,366	14.69	▲1.56
Total valid votes		9,301	100.00	
Total rejected ballots		305		
Unreturned ballots		0		
Turnout		9,606	73.03	▼1.32
Registered electors		13,153		
Majority		6,569	70.63	▲36.59
BN hold		Swing		

Selangor state election, 1978
Party	Candidate	Votes	%	∆%
BN	Zaleha Ismail	4,865	60.45	▲4.93
Independent	Supian Sirman	2,126	26.42	▲26.42
PAS	Norhadi Hasan Ali	1,057	13.13	▲13.13
Total valid votes		8,048	100.00	
Total rejected ballots		591		
Unreturned ballots		0		
Turnout		8,639	74.35	▲2.16
Registered electors		11,619		
Majority		2,739	34.03	▲23.00
BN hold		Swing		

Selangor state election, 1974
Party	Candidate	Votes	%
BN	Mohamed Said Bahir	3,311	55.52
Independent	Hashim Mahmood	2,653	44.48
Total valid votes		5,964	100.00
Total rejected ballots		761	
Unreturned ballots		0	
Turnout		6,725	71.02
Registered electors		9,469	
Majority		658	11.04
This was a new constituency created.
