= Badrulamin Bahron =

Malaysian politician

Ustaz Dr. Badrulamin Bahron

Personal details
- Born: Badrulamin bin Bahron Sabah, Malaysia
- Party: National Justice Party (keADILan) (1999–2003); People's Justice Party (PKR) (2003–present)
- Other political affiliations: Barisan Alternatif (BA) (1999–2004); Pakatan Rakyat (PR) (2008–2015); Pakatan Harapan (PH) (2015–present)
- Education: Al-Azhar University (BA); University of Kent (LLM); University of Birmingham (PhD)
- Occupation: Politician, law lecturer
- Profession: Associate professor

Badrulamin bin Bahron, commonly known as Badrul Amin, is a Malaysian politician and former associate professor of law who taught at the International Islamic University Malaysia (IIUM) from 1984 to 1999. A member of the People's Justice Party (PKR), he contested the Sabak Bernam parliamentary seat during the 2004 and 2008 general elections, losing both times to Barisan Nasional candidates.

== Early life and education ==
Badrulamin bin Bahron was born in Sabah. He pursued his higher education in Islamic law, earning a Bachelor of Arts in Shariah from Al-Azhar University in Egypt. He later obtained a Master of Laws (LLM) in Comparative Law from the University of Kent and a PhD in Islamic Constitutional Law from the University of Birmingham.

== Career ==
From 1984 to 1999, Badrulamin worked as an assistant professor of law at the International Islamic University Malaysia (IIUM). He later served as the Communications Director in the Selangor Menteri Besar Office. He subsequently focused on community work and Islamic propagation.

== Political career ==
Badrulamin was an early member of the National Justice Party (KeADILan) and its successor, the People's Justice Party (PKR). During the 2001 party elections, he was elected a member of the Central Leadership Council. He also served as the Sabak Bernam branch chief from 2000, as well as the vice chairman of the Selangor State Liaison Committee.

During the political tension surrounding the Reformasi movement, Badrulamin was faced with detention multiple times. In September 1999, he was detained after leading congregational prayers during a rally at the National Mosque. He was remanded in custody for five days for further investigation. Badrulamin was arrested under the Internal Security Act (ISA) in April 2001, one of ten activists detained while organising a demonstration to mark the second anniversary of Anwar Ibrahim's sentencing. He was held at Kamunting Detention Centre and released on 12 June 2003 when his two-year detention order expired and was not renewed.

Badrulamin contested several elections but failed to win each time. In the 2004 and 2008 general elections, he contested the Sabak Bernam parliamentary seat as a PKR candidate, losing both times to Barisan Nasional candidates Mat Yasir Ikhsan and Abdul Rahman Bakri, the latter by a narrow margin. During the same election cycles, he also ran for state assembly seats in Selangor, contesting Paya Jaras in 2004 and Kuang in 2008, but was unsuccessful both times. Additionally, he contested and lost the Silam parliamentary seat in Sabah during the 1999 and 2013 elections.

== Controversies ==
=== Khalwat allegations ===
On 25 February 2012, Badrulamin was investigated for alleged close proximity (khalwat) by the Pahang Islamic Religious Department (JAIP) at a hotel in Kuantan, where he was attending a party leadership event. The incident was investigated under Section 145 of the Administration of Islamic Law and Malay Customs Enactment of Pahang. Badrulamin denied the allegations, stating that the encounter was premeditated by third parties to damage his reputation. He clarified that he was accompanied by his wife at the event and had known the woman and her husband for over a year through a pilgrimage group.

== Election results ==
Parliament of Malaysia
Year	Constituency	Candidate	Votes	Pct	Opponent(s)	Votes	Pct	Ballots cast	Majority	Turnout
1999	P163 Silam	Badrulamin Bahron (keADILan)	8,110	35.7%	Railey Jeffrey (UMNO)	14,629	64.3%	22,739	6,519	54.7%
2004	P092 Sabak Bernam	Badrulamin Bahron (PKR)	8,478	38.0%	Mat Yasir Ikhsan (UMNO)	13,826	62.0%	22,304	5,348	74.8%
2008	P092 Sabak Bernam	Badrulamin Bahron (PKR)	10,720	47.1%	Abdul Rahman Bakri (UMNO)	12,055	52.9%	22,775	1,335	75.1%
2013	P188 Silam	Badrulamin Bahron (PKR)	9,671	25.1%	Nasrun Mansur (UMNO)	23,058	59.9%	39,663	13,387	76.8%
2013	P188 Silam	Badrulamin Bahron (PKR)	9,671	25.1%	Dumi Masdal (IND)	4,959	12.9%	39,663	13,387	76.8%
2013	P188 Silam	Badrulamin Bahron (PKR)	9,671	25.1%	Apas @ Nawawie Saking (STAR)	841	2.2%	39,663	13,387	76.8%

Selangor State Legislative Assembly
Year	Constituency	Candidate	Votes	Pct	Opponent(s)	Votes	Pct	Ballots cast	Majority	Turnout
2004	N38 Paya Jaras	Badrulamin Bahron (PKR)	7,122	39.4%	Muhammad Bushro Mat Johor (UMNO)	10,966	60.6%	18,088	3,844	74.6%
2008	N13 Kuang	Badrulamin Bahron (PKR)	6,532	48.1%	Abdul Shukur Idrus (UMNO)	7,049	51.9%	13,581	517	80.9%
