= Sabak Bernam (federal constituency) =

Federal constituency of Selangor, Malaysia

Sabak Bernam (P092)
Selangor constituency

Federal constituency
- Legislature: Dewan Rakyat
- MP: Kalam Salan; PN
- Constituency created: 1958
- First contested: 1959
- Last contested: 2022

Demographics
- Population (2020): 48,104
- Electors (2023): 51,842
- Area (km²): 344
- Pop. density (per km²): 139.8

Sabak Bernam is a federal constituency in Sabak Bernam District, Selangor, Malaysia, that has been represented since 1959 in the Dewan Rakyat, the lower house of Malaysia's bicameral federal legislature.

The federal constituency was created in the 1958 redistribution and is mandated to return a single member to the Dewan Rakyat under the first past the post voting system.

== Demographics ==
Ethnic breakdown of Sabak Bernam's electorate as of 2018
1. Malay (82.1%)
2. Chinese (13.1%)
3. Indian (4.70%)
4. Other ethnicities (0.20%)
Age breakdown of Sabak Bernam's electorate as of 2022
1. 18-20 (6.01%)
2. 21-29 (20.7%)
3. 30-39 (23.6%)
4. 40-49 (16.6%)
5. 50-59 (14.6%)
6. 60-69 (10.4%)
7. 70-79 (5.89%)
8. 80-89 (1.82%)
9. above 90 (0.42%)
Gender breakdown of Sabak Bernam's electorate as of 2022
1. Male (49.2%)
2. Female (50.8%)

== History ==
=== Polling districts ===
According to the gazette issued on 18 July 2023, the Sabak Bernam constituency has a total of 32 polling districts.

State constituency	Polling districts	Code	Location
Sungai Air Tawar (N01)	Parit Baharu Baruh	092/01/01	SJK (C) Poay Chneh Parit Baru Sungai Air Tawar
Sungai Air Tawar (N01)	Sungai Tengar Utara	092/01/02	SRA Al-Ittikhadiah Sungai Tengar
Sungai Air Tawar (N01)	Sungai Air Tawar	092/01/03	SK Seri Mawar Sungai Air Tawar
Sungai Air Tawar (N01)	Sungai Bernam	092/01/04	SJK (T) Ladang Sungai Bernam
Sungai Air Tawar (N01)	Sungai Air Tawar Selatan	092/01/05	SRA Tebuk Mufrad Sungai Air Tawar
Sungai Air Tawar (N01)	Sungai Tengar Selatan	092/01/06	SK Sungai Tengar
Sungai Air Tawar (N01)	Kampung Parit Baharu	092/01/07	SK Parit Baharu
Sungai Air Tawar (N01)	Kampung Teluk Belaga	092/01/08	SK Seri Cempaka
Sungai Air Tawar (N01)	Beting Kepah	092/01/09	SJK (C) Phooi Min Telok Rhu
Sungai Air Tawar (N01)	Kampung Teluk Rhu	092/01/10	SK Teluk Ru
Sungai Air Tawar (N01)	Simpang Empat	092/01/11	SK Simpang 4 Bagan Nakhoda Omar
Sungai Air Tawar (N01)	Kampung Sekendi	092/01/12	SK Sekendi Sabak Bernam
Sungai Air Tawar (N01)	Kampung Banting	092/01/13	SK Kampong Banting
Sungai Air Tawar (N01)	Kampung Batu 38 Buruh	092/01/14	SK Batu 38 Sabak Bernam
Sungai Air Tawar (N01)	Kampung Baharu	092/01/15	SK Kampung Baharu Sabak Bernam
Sabak (N02)	Sabak Bernam Barat	092/02/01	SMA Muhamamdiah Pekan Sabak
Sabak (N02)	Kampung Air Manis	092/02/02	Balai Jawatankuasa Kemajuan Dan Keselamatan Kampung (JKKK) Kampung Batu 37 Darat
Sabak (N02)	Kampung Seri Aman	092/02/03	SK Panchang Bendera Sungai Besar
Sabak (N02)	Teluk Pulai	092/02/04	SK Tun Doktor Ismail
Sabak (N02)	Torkington	092/02/05	SJK (T) Ladang Sabak Bernam
Sabak (N02)	Sabak Bernam Timur	092/02/06	Kolej Tingkatan Eman Tunku Abdul Rahman Putra Sabak Bernam; SK Doktor Abdul Latiff
Sabak (N02)	Bagan Nira	092/02/07	SRA Hidayatul Hasanah Bagan Nira'
Sabak (N02)	Kampung Sapintas	092/02/08	SRA Batu 2 Sapintas
Sabak (N02)	Kampung Bagan Terap	092/02/09	SK Bagan Terap
Sabak (N02)	Bagan Terap Parit Sembilan	092/02/10	SK Seri Bahagia Sungai Besar
Sabak (N02)	Tebuk Kenchong	092/02/11	SK Pair Enam Sungai Besar
Sabak (N02)	Parit Enam	092/02/12	SRA Parit 6 Timur Sungai Besar
Sabak (N02)	Parit Dua Timur	092/02/13	Dewan Orang Ramai Parit Enam Sungai Besar
Sabak (N02)	Parit Tiga & Empat	092/02/14	Balai Jawatankuasa Kemajuan Dan Keselamatan (JKKK) Parit 4 & 5 Barat
Sabak (N02)	Parit Satu Barat	092/02/15	SK Seri Makmur Sungai Besar
Sabak (N02)	Sungai Lias	092/02/16	SJK (C) Sin Min Sungai Besar
Sabak (N02)	Batu 4 Sapintas	092/02/17	SK Sapintas

=== Representation history ===
Members of Parliament for Sabak Bernam
Parliament	No	Years	Member	Party	Vote Share
Constituency created from Kuala Selangor
Parliament of the Federation of Malaya
1st	P077	1959–1963	Syed Hashim Syed Ajam (سيد هشيم سيد اجم)	Alliance (UMNO)	8,003; 65.46%
Parliament of Malaysia
1st	P077	1963–1964	Syed Hashim Syed Ajam (سيد هشيم سيد اجم)	Alliance (UMNO)	8,003; 65.46%
2nd	P077	1964–1969	Mustapha Abdul Jabar (مصطفى عبدالجبار)	Alliance (UMNO)	11,372; 75.50%
		1969–1971	Parliament was suspended		
3rd	P077	1971–1974	Mustapha Abdul Jabar (مصطفى عبدالجبار)	Alliance (UMNO)	12,827; 67.87%
3rd	P077	1973–1974	Mustapha Abdul Jabar (مصطفى عبدالجبار)	BN (UMNO)	12,827; 67.87%
4th	P073	1974–1978	Mustapha Abdul Jabar (مصطفى عبدالجبار)	BN (UMNO)	9,998; 67.82%
5th	P073	1978–1982	Jamaluddin Suhaimi (جمال الدين سوهايمي)	BN (UMNO)	12,618; 68.41%
6th	P073	1982–1986	Jamaluddin Suhaimi (جمال الدين سوهايمي)	BN (UMNO)	15,707; 79.14%
7th	P082	1986–1990	Hussein Taib (حسين طائب)	BN (UMNO)	14,810; 74.47%
8th	P082	1990–1995	Mahbud Hashim (مهبود هشيم)	BN (UMNO)	17,715; 77.42%
9th	P086	1995–1999	Mahbud Hashim (مهبود هشيم)	BN (UMNO)	17,978; 83.60%
10th	P086	1999–2004	Zainal Dahlan (زاينل دحلان)	BN (UMNO)	11,809; 51.98%
11th	P092	2004–2008	Mat Yasir Ikhsan (مت ياسر اخسن)	BN (UMNO)	13,826; 61.99%
12th	P092	2008–2012	Abdul Rahman Bakri (عبدالرحمن بکري)	BN (UMNO)	12,055; 52.93%
12th	P092	2012–2013	Vacant		
13th	P092	2013–2018	Mohd Fasiah Mohd Fakeh (محمد فسيح بن محمد فقه)	BN (UMNO)	16,510; 53.04%
14th	P092	2018	Mohd Fasiah Mohd Fakeh (محمد فسيح بن محمد فقه)	BN (UMNO)	12,862; 38.57%
14th	P092	2018–2019	Mohd Fasiah Mohd Fakeh (محمد فسيح بن محمد فقه)	Independent	12,862; 38.57%
14th	P092	2019–2020	Mohd Fasiah Mohd Fakeh (محمد فسيح بن محمد فقه)	PH (BERSATU)	12,862; 38.57%
14th	P092	2020–2022	Mohd Fasiah Mohd Fakeh (محمد فسيح بن محمد فقه)	PN (BERSATU)	12,862; 38.57%
15th	P092	2022–present	Kalam Salan (كلام سالن)	PN (BERSATU)	17,973; 43.86%

=== State constituency ===
Parliamentary constituency	State constituency						
Parliamentary constituency	1955–59*	1959–1974	1974–1986	1986–1995	1995–2004	2004–2018	2018–present
Sabak Bernam		Sabak					
Sabak Bernam					Sungai Air Tawar		
Sabak Bernam				Sungai Ayer Tawar			
Sabak Bernam				Sungai Besar			
Sabak Bernam			Sungei Ayer Tawar				
Sabak Bernam		Sungei Besar					

=== Historical boundaries ===
State Constituency	Area					
State Constituency	1959	1974	1984	1994	2003	2018
Sabak	Bagan Terap; Bagan Nakhoda Omar; Parit Baru; Sabak Bernam; Sungai Air Tawar	Bagan Terap; Kampung Banting; Sabak Bernam; Sungai Lias; Teluk Sepintas			Bagan Sungai Burung; Bagan Terap; Panchang Bedena; Parit Enam; Sabak Bernam	
Sungai Air Tawar		Bagan Nakhoda Omar; Parit Baru; Kampung Sungai Tawar; Sungai Air Tawar; Tebuk Murid			Bagan Nakhoda Omar; Parit Baru; Kampung Banting; Kampung Sungai Tawar; Sungai Air Tawar	
Sungai Besar	Kampung Belia Dua; Panchang Bedena; Parit Enam; Pasir Panjang; Sungai Besar	Bagan Sungai Burung; Kampung Sungai Limau; Panchang Bedena; Parit Enam; Sungai Besar				

=== Current state assembly members ===
No.	State Constituency	Member	Coalition (Party)
N01	Sungai Air Tawar	Rizam Ismail	BN (UMNO)
N02	Sabak	Sallehen Mukhyi	PN (PAS)

=== Local governments & postcodes ===
No.	State Constituency	Local Government	Postcode
N01	Sungai Air Tawar	Sabak Bernam District Council	45100 Sungai Ayer Tawar; 45200 Sabak Bernam; 45300 Sungai Besar
N02	Sabak	Sabak Bernam District Council	45100 Sungai Ayer Tawar; 45200 Sabak Bernam; 45300 Sungai Besar

== Election results ==
Malaysian general election, 2022
Party	Candidate	Votes	%	∆%
PN	Kalam Salan	17,973	43.86	▲43.86
BN	Abdul Rahman Bakri	12,917	31.52	▼7.05
PH	Shamsul Ma'arif Ismail	9,627	23.49	▲23.49
PEJUANG	Eizlan Yusof	460	1.12	▲1.12
Total valid votes		40,977	100.00	
Total rejected ballots		446		
Unreturned ballots		62		
Turnout		41,485	79.40	▼3.86
Registered electors		51,609		
Majority		5,056	12.34	▲7.32
PN gain from BN		Swing		?
Source(s) https://lom.agc.gov.my/ilims/upload/portal/akta/outputp/1753283/PUB612.pdf

Malaysian general election, 2018
Party	Candidate	Votes	%	∆%
BN	Mohd Fasiah Mohd Fakeh	12,862	38.57	▼14.47
PKR	Warno Dogol	11,188	33.55	▼13.41
PAS	Muhammad Labib Abd Jalil	9,300	27.89	▲27.89
Total valid votes		33,350	100.00	
Total rejected ballots		565		
Unreturned ballots		108		
Turnout		34,023	83.26	▼2.11
Registered electors		40,863		
Majority		1,674	5.02	▼1.06
BN hold		Swing		
Source(s) "His Majesty's Government Gazette - Notice of Contested Election, Parliament for the State of Selangor [P.U. (B) 239/2018]" (PDF). Attorney General's Chambers of Malaysia. 3 May 2018. Archived from the original (PDF) on 2019-07-19. "Federal Government Gazette - Results of Contested Election and Statements of the Poll after the Official Addition of Votes, Parliamentary Constituencies for the State of Selangor [P.U. (B) 313/2018]" (PDF). Attorney General's Chambers of Malaysia. 28 May 2018. Archived from the original (PDF) on 2019-07-19.

Malaysian general election, 2013
Party	Candidate	Votes	%	∆%
BN	Mohd Fasiah Mohd Fakeh	16,510	53.04	▲0.11
PKR	Abdul Aziz Bari	14,620	46.96	▼0.11
Total valid votes		31,130	100.00	
Total rejected ballots		576		
Unreturned ballots		153		
Turnout		31,859	85.37	▲10.23
Registered electors		37,318		
Majority		1,890	6.08	▲0.22
BN hold		Swing		
Source(s) "Federal Government Gazette - Notice of Contested Election, Parliament for the State of Selangor [P.U. (B) 176/2013]" (PDF). Attorney General's Chambers of Malaysia. 26 April 2013. Archived from the original (PDF) on 2018-09-30. "Federal Government Gazette - Results of Contested Election and Statements of the Poll after the Official Addition of Votes, Parliamentary Constituencies for the State of Selangor [P.U. (B) 217/2013]" (PDF). Attorney General's Chambers of Malaysia. 22 May 2013. Archived from the original (PDF) on 2018-09-30.

Malaysian general election, 2008
Party	Candidate	Votes	%	∆%
BN	Abdul Rahman Bakri	12,055	52.93	▼9.06
PKR	Badrulamin Bahron	10,720	47.07	▲9.06
Total valid votes		22,775	100.00	
Total rejected ballots		711		
Unreturned ballots		95		
Turnout		23,581	75.14	▲0.33
Registered electors		31,381		
Majority		1,335	5.86	▼18.12
BN hold		Swing		

Malaysian general election, 2004
Party	Candidate	Votes	%	∆%
BN	Mat Yasir Ikhsan	13,826	61.99	▲10.01
PKR	Badrulamin Bahron	8,478	38.01	▼10.01
Total valid votes		22,304	100.00	
Total rejected ballots		776		
Unreturned ballots		7		
Turnout		23,087	74.81	▲5.77
Registered electors		30,860		
Majority		5,348	23.98	▲20.02
BN hold		Swing		

Malaysian general election, 1999
Party	Candidate	Votes	%	∆%
BN	Zainal Dahlan	11,809	51.98	▼31.62
PKR	Ghazali Basri	10,908	48.02	▲48.02
Total valid votes		22,717	100.00	
Total rejected ballots		743		
Unreturned ballots		38		
Turnout		23,498	69.04	▲3.14
Registered electors		34,035		
Majority		901	3.96	▼63.24
BN hold		Swing		

Malaysian general election, 1995
Party	Candidate	Votes	%	∆%
BN	Mahbud Hashim	17,978	83.60	▲6.18
S46	Dawood Sikandar Ali	3,526	16.40	▲16.40
Total valid votes		21,504	100.00	
Total rejected ballots		1,419		
Unreturned ballots		67		
Turnout		22,990	65.90	▼4.77
Registered electors		34,886		
Majority		14,452	67.20	▲12.36
BN hold		Swing		

Malaysian general election, 1990
Party	Candidate	Votes	%	∆%
BN	Mahbud Hashim	17,715	77.42	▲2.95
PAS	Abd. Razak Dawami	5,167	22.58	▼2.95
Total valid votes		22,882	100.00	
Total rejected ballots		977		
Unreturned ballots		0		
Turnout		23,859	70.67	▲5.19
Registered electors		33,761		
Majority		12,548	54.84	▲5.60
BN hold		Swing		

Malaysian general election, 1986
Party	Candidate	Votes	%	∆%
BN	Hussein Taib	14,810	74.47	▼4.67
PAS	Abd. Razak Dawami	5,078	25.53	▲4.67
Total valid votes		19,888	100.00	
Total rejected ballots		756		
Unreturned ballots		0		
Turnout		20,644	65.48	▼3.41
Registered electors		31,529		
Majority		9,732	49.24	▼9.04
BN hold		Swing		

Malaysian general election, 1982
Party	Candidate	Votes	%	∆%
BN	Jamaluddin Suhaimi	15,707	79.14	▲10.73
PAS	Hassan Shukri	4,140	20.86	▼10.73
Total valid votes		19,847	100.00	
Total rejected ballots		977		
Unreturned ballots		0		
Turnout		20,824	68.89	▲0.18
Registered electors		30,227		
Majority		11,567	58.28	▲21.43
BN hold		Swing		

Malaysian general election, 1978
Party	Candidate	Votes	%	∆%
BN	Jamaluddin Suhaimi	12,618	68.41	▲0.59
PAS	Shaarani Johari	5,828	31.59	▲31.59
Total valid votes		18,446	100.00	
Total rejected ballots		906		
Unreturned ballots		0		
Turnout		19,352	68.71	▼2.40
Registered electors		28,163		
Majority		6,790	36.82	▲1.18
BN hold		Swing		

Malaysian general election, 1974
Party	Candidate	Votes	%	∆%
BN	Mustapha Abdul Jabar	9,998	67.82	▲67.82
Independent	Taiban Hassan	4,745	32.18	▲32.18
Total valid votes		14,743	100.00	
Total rejected ballots		1,145		
Unreturned ballots		0		
Turnout		15,888	71.11	▲2.55
Registered electors		22,474		
Majority		5,253	35.64	▼0.10
BN gain from Alliance Party (Malaysia) Party (Malaysia)		Swing		?

Malaysian general election, 1969
Party	Candidate	Votes	%	∆%
Alliance	Mustapha Abdul Jabar	12,827	67.87	▼7.63
PMIP	Hassan Shukri	6,073	32.13	▲7.63
Total valid votes		18,900	100.00	
Total rejected ballots		1,356		
Unreturned ballots		0		
Turnout		20,256	68.56	▼5.18
Registered electors		29,545		
Majority		6,754	35.74	▼15.26
Alliance hold		Swing		

Malaysian general election, 1964
Party	Candidate	Votes	%	∆%
Alliance	Mustapha Abdul Jabar	11,372	75.50	▲10.04
PMIP	Ariffin Ayob	3,690	24.50	▼10.04
Total valid votes		15,062	100.00	
Total rejected ballots		1,431		
Unreturned ballots		0		
Turnout		16,493	73.74	▲7.76
Registered electors		22,367		
Majority		7,682	51.00	▲20.08
Alliance hold		Swing		

Malayan general election, 1959
Party	Candidate	Votes	%
Alliance	Syed Hashim Syed Ajam	8,003	65.46
PMIP	Abdul Hakim Hilmi	4,222	34.54
Total valid votes		12,225	100.00
Total rejected ballots		240	
Unreturned ballots		0	
Turnout		12,465	65.98
Registered electors		18,892	
Majority		3,781	30.92
This was a new constituency created.
