= Kalam Salan =

Malaysian politician (born 1965)

Yang Berhormat Tuan Kalam Salan MP
- كلام سلان

Member of the Malaysian Parliament for Sabak Bernam
- Incumbent
- Assumed office 19 November 2022
- Preceded by: Mohd Fasiah Mohd Fakeh (PH–BERSATU)
- Majority: 5,056 (2022)

Personal details
- Born: Kalam bin Salan; 6 January 1965 (age 61) Sabak, Selangor, Malaysia
- Citizenship: Malaysia
- Party: Malaysian United Indigenous Party (BERSATU)
- Other political affiliations: Perikatan Nasional (PN)
- Spouse: Mariamah Abu Mansor
- Children: 3
- Occupation: Politician

Kalam bin Salan (born 6 January 1965) is a Malaysian politician who has served as the Member of Parliament (MP) for Sabak Bernam since November 2022. He is a member of the Malaysian United Indigenous Party (BERSATU), a component party of the Perikatan Nasional (PN) coalition.

== Personal life ==
Kalam speaks Javanese. On 21 October 2026 during a debate session on the 2027 national budget, he read a open letter statement entirely in the language with granted parliamentary permission addressed to Indonesian President Prabowo Subianto on taking urgent action over the transboundary forest fire and haze crisis in many places across Indonesia also spread to Malaysia gravely affecting Malaysian life and industry, including Indonesian migrant plantation workers there.

== Election results ==
Parliament of Malaysia
Year	Constituency	Candidate	Votes	Pct	Opponent(s)	Votes	Pct	Ballots cast	Majority	Turnout
2022	P092 Sabak Bernam	Kalam Salan (BERSATU)	17,973	43.86%	Abdul Rahman Bakri (UMNO)	12,917	31.52%	41,485	5,056	79.40%
2022	P092 Sabak Bernam	Kalam Salan (BERSATU)	17,973	43.86%	Shamsul Ma'arif Ismail (AMANAH)	9,627	23.49%	41,485	5,056	79.40%
2022	P092 Sabak Bernam	Kalam Salan (BERSATU)	17,973	43.86%	Eizlan Yusof (PEJUANG)	460	1.12%	41,485	5,056	79.40%

== Honours ==
=== Honours of Malaysia ===
- Malaysia
  - Recipient of the 17th Yang di-Pertuan Agong Installation Medal (2024)

== See also ==
- Members of the Dewan Rakyat, 15th Malaysian Parliament
