= Kalbi =

Kalbi may refer to:

- Galbi, a Korean dish
- Kalbiyya, a Syrian Alawite tribe
- An Indian caste, see Anjana Chaudhari

== People ==
- Arbo Kalbi (1911–1940), the nom de guerre of Finnish war correspondent Kalevi Heikkinen
- Salleh Kalbi (1964–2025), Malaysian politician
