= Dengkil (state constituency) =

State constituency of Selangor

Dengkil (N55)
Selangor constituency

State constituency
- Legislature: Selangor State Legislative Assembly
MLA
Jamil Salleh
PN
- Constituency created: 1958
- First contested: 1959
- Last contested: 2023

Demographics
- Electors (2023): 93,931

Dengkil is a state constituency in Selangor, Malaysia, that has been represented in the Selangor State Legislative Assembly since 1959. It has been represented by Jamil Salleh of Perikatan Nasional (PN) since 2023.

The state constituency was created in the 1958 redistribution and is mandated to return a single member to the Selangor State Legislative Assembly under the first past the post voting system.

== Demographics ==
Ethnic breakdown of Dengkil's electorate as of 2023
1. Malay (68.9%)
2. Chinese (14.6%)
3. Indian (10.7%)
4. Other ethnicities (5.81%)

== History ==
=== Polling districts ===
According to the federal gazette issued on 30 March 2018, the Dengkil constituency is divided into 23 polling districts.

State constituency	Polling Districts	Code	Location
Dengkil (N55）	Sungai Lempit	113/55/01	SK Olak Lempit
Dengkil (N55）	Bukit Canggang	113/55/02	SK Bukit Changgang
Dengkil (N55）	Labuhan Dagang	113/55/03	SK Labohan Dagang
Dengkil (N55）	Ampar Tenang	113/55/04	Dewan Orang Ramai Taman Gemilang
Dengkil (N55）	Kampung Baharu Dengkil	113/55/05	SJK (C) Dengkil
Dengkil (N55）	Kampung Dengkil	113/55/06	SK Dengkil
Dengkil (N55）	Pulau Meranti	113/55/07	SK Pulau Meranti
Dengkil (N55）	Sungai Merab Utara	113/55/08	SRA Dato' Abu Bakar Baginda
Dengkil (N55）	Kampung Dato Abu Bakar Baginda	113/55/09	SK Dato' Abu Bakar Baginda
Dengkil (N55）	Sungai Merab	113/55/10	SK Sungai Merab Luar
Dengkil (N55）	Desa Putra	113/55/11	SK Desa Putra
Dengkil (N55）	Jenderam Hilir	113/55/12	SK Jenderam Hilir
Dengkil (N55）	Sungai Buah	113/55/13	SRA Sungai Buah
Dengkil (N55）	Rtb Datok Harun	113/55/14	SK Rancangan Tanah Belia Bukit Changgang
Dengkil (N55）	Ladang Ampar Tenang	113/55/15	SJK (T) Ampar Tenang
Dengkil (N55）	Kampung Melot	113/55/16	SK Sungai Melut (A) Dengkil
Dengkil (N55）	Bandar Putra Perdana	113/55/17	SK Taman Putra Perdana; SK Taman Putra Perdana 2
Dengkil (N55）	Taman Permata Dengkil	113/55/18	SJK (T) Taman Permata
Dengkil (N55）	Desa Air Hitam	113/55/19	SJK (C) Sin Ming
Dengkil (N55）	Cyberjaya	113/55/20	SK Cyberjaya
Dengkil (N55）	Selangor Dredging	113/55/21	Balai Raya Kampung Selangor Dredging
Dengkil (N55）	Desa Pinggiran Putra	113/56/22	SK Desa Pinggiran Putra
Dengkil (N55）	Kota Warisan	113/56/23	SK Kota Warisan

=== Representation history ===
Members of the Legislative Assembly for Dengkil
Assembly	No	Years	Member	Party
Constituency created
1st	N23	1959-1964	Abu Bakar Baginda	Alliance (UMNO)
2nd	N23	1964-1969	Raja Nong Chik Raja Ishak	Alliance (UMNO)
		1969-1971	Assembly dissolved	
3rd	N23	1971-1973	Suhaimi Kamaruddin	Alliance (UMNO)
3rd	N23	1973-1974	Suhaimi Kamaruddin	BN (UMNO)
4th	N31	1974-1978	Ahmad Razali Mohamad Ali	BN (UMNO)
5th	N31	1978-1982	Ahmad Razali Mohamad Ali	BN (UMNO)
6th	N31	1982-1986	T. M. Thurai	BN (MIC)
7th	N40	1986-1990	T. M. Thurai	BN (MIC)
8th	N40	1990-1995	M. Sellathevan	BN (MIC)
9th	N47	1995-1999	Mohd Sharif Jajang	BN (UMNO)
10th	N47	1999-2004	Mohd Sharif Jajang	BN (UMNO)
11th	N55	2004-2008	Suhaimi Ghazali	BN (UMNO)
12th	N55	2008-2013	Marsum Paing	BN (UMNO)
13th	N55	2013-2018	Shahrum Mohd Sharif	BN (UMNO)
14th	N55	2018-2020	Adhif Syan Abdullah	PH (BERSATU)
14th	N55	2020-2023	Adhif Syan Abdullah	PN (BERSATU)
15th	N55	2023–present	Jamil Salleh	PN (BERSATU)

== Election results ==
Selangor state election, 2023
Party	Candidate	Votes	%	∆%
PN	Jamil Salleh	33,565	48.51	▲48.51
BN	Noorazli Said	33,184	47.95	▲15.47
Parti Sosialis Malaysia	Darren Ong Chung Lee	1,782	2.58	▲2.58
Parti Utama Rakyat	Mohd Daud Leong	668	0.97	▲0.97
Total valid votes		69,199	100.00	
Total rejected ballots		437		
Unreturned ballots		95		
Turnout		69,731	74.24	▼13.79
Registered electors		93,931		
Majority		381	0.56	▼15.26
PN gain from PKR		Swing		?

Selangor state election, 2018
Party	Candidate	Votes	%	∆%
PKR	Adhif Syan Abdullah	21,172	48.30	▲2.06
BN	Shahrum Mohd Sharif	14,238	32.48	▼20.68
PAS	Yusmi Haniff Ariffin	8,422	19.21	▲19.21
Total valid votes		43,832	100.00	
Total rejected ballots		465		
Unreturned ballots		126		
Turnout		44,423	88.03	▼0.60
Registered electors		50,466		
Majority		6,934	15.82	▲8.90
PKR gain from BN		Swing		.

Selangor state election, 2013
Party	Candidate	Votes	%	∆%
BN	Shahrum Mohd Sharif	17,801	53.16	▼5.13
PKR	Borhan Aman Shah	15,484	46.24	▲4.53
KITA	Azmi Othman	203	0.61	▲0.61
Total valid votes		33,488	100.00	
Total rejected ballots		459		
Unreturned ballots		85		
Turnout		34,032	88.63	▲9.75
Registered electors		38,400		
Majority		2,317	6.92	▼9.66
BN hold		Swing		
Source(s) "Federal Government Gazette - Notice of Contested Election, State Legislative Assembly for the State of Selangor [P.U. (B) 192/2013]" (PDF). Attorney General's Chambers of Malaysia. 26 April 2013. Archived from the original (PDF) on 2019-12-29. "Federal Government Gazette - Results of Contested Election and Statements of the Poll after the Official Addition of Votes, State Constituencies for the State of Selangor [P.U. (B) 233/2013]" (PDF). Attorney General's Chambers of Malaysia. 22 May 2013. Archived from the original (PDF) on 2018-10-02.

Selangor state election, 2008
Party	Candidate	Votes	%	∆%
BN	Marsum Paing	11,838	58.29	▼13.03
PKR	Ishammudin Ismail	8,471	41.71	▲36.32
Total valid votes		20,309	100.00	
Total rejected ballots		417		
Unreturned ballots		37		
Turnout		20,763	78.88	▲4.05
Registered electors		26,322		
Majority		3,367	16.58	▼31.45
BN hold		Swing		

Selangor state election, 2004
Party	Candidate	Votes	%	∆%
BN	Suhaimi Mohd Ghazali	12,336	71.32	▲13.69
PAS	Mohd Haslin Hassan	4,028	23.29	▲23.29
PKR	Husin Dahlan	932	5.39	▼36.98
Total valid votes		17,296	100.00	
Total rejected ballots		421		
Unreturned ballots		13		
Turnout		17,730	74.83	▲0.18
Registered electors		23,695		
Majority		8,308	48.03	▲32.70
BN hold		Swing		

Selangor state election, 1999
Party	Candidate	Votes	%	∆%
BN	Mohd Sharif Jajang	7,449	57.63	▼22.19
PKR	Mohammad Sahar Mat Din	5,477	42.37	▲42.37
Total valid votes		12,926	100.00	
Total rejected ballots		425		
Unreturned ballots		12		
Turnout		13,363	74.65	▲0.75
Registered electors		17,901		
Majority		1,972	15.26	▼44.38
BN hold		Swing		

Selangor state election, 1995
Party	Candidate	Votes	%	∆%
BN	Mohd Sharif Jajang	9,766	79.82	▲16.51
PAS	Mohsinon Tahir	2,469	20.18	▼16.51
Total valid votes		12,235	100.00	
Total rejected ballots		424		
Unreturned ballots		40		
Turnout		12,699	73.90	▼3.07
Registered electors		17,184		
Majority		7,297	59.64	▲33.02
BN hold		Swing		

Selangor state election, 1990
Party	Candidate	Votes	%	∆%
BN	M. Sellathevan	8,859	63.31	▼3.99
PAS	Mohd Fauzi Shaffie	5,133	36.69	▲3.99
Total valid votes		13,992	100.00	
Total rejected ballots		447		
Unreturned ballots		0		
Turnout		14,439	76.97	▲6.28
Registered electors		18,760		
Majority		3,726	26.62	▼7.98
BN hold		Swing		

Selangor state election, 1986
Party	Candidate	Votes	%	∆%
BN	T. M. Thurai	6,326	67.30	▼14.64
PAS	Abdul Halim Mohd Amin	3,074	32.70	▲23.95
Total valid votes		9,400	100.00	
Total rejected ballots		176		
Unreturned ballots		0		
Turnout		9,576	70.69	▼6.73
Registered electors		13,546		
Majority		3,252	34.60	▼38.03
BN hold		Swing		

Selangor state election, 1982
Party	Candidate	Votes	%	∆%
BN	T. M. Thurai	7,996	81.94	▼6.54
DAP	Yap Poh Soo	908	9.31	▲9.31
PAS	Amat Sulaiman	854	8.75	▲8,75
Total valid votes		9,758	100.00	
Total rejected ballots		167		
Unreturned ballots		0		
Turnout		9,925	77.42	
Registered electors		12,819		
Majority		7,088	72.63	▼4.33
BN hold		Swing		

Selangor state election, 1978
Party	Candidate	Votes	%	∆%
BN	Ahmad Razali Mohamad Ali	6,151	88.48	▲7.08
Independent	Zainal Abidin Karim	801	11.52	▲11.52
Total valid votes		6,952	100.00	
Total rejected ballots		515		
Unreturned ballots		0		
Turnout		7,467	78.24	▲0.05
Registered electors		9,544		
Majority		5,350	76.96	▲14.15
BN hold		Swing		

Selangor state election, 1974
Party	Candidate	Votes	%	∆%
BN	Ahmad Razali Mohamad Ali	4,408	81.40	▲81.40
PEKEMAS	Zainuddin Karim	1,007	18.60	▲18.60
Total valid votes		5,415	100.00	
Total rejected ballots		397		
Unreturned ballots		0		
Turnout		5,812	80.63	
Registered electors		7,208		
Majority		3,401	62.80	
BN gain from Alliance		Swing		?

Selangor state election, 1969
Party	Candidate	Votes	%	∆%
On the nomination day, Suhaimi Kamaruddin won uncontested.
Alliance	Suhaimi Kamaruddin			
Total valid votes			100.00	
Total rejected ballots				
Unreturned ballots				
Turnout				
Registered electors		10,647		
Majority				
Alliance hold		Swing		

Selangor state election, 1964
Party	Candidate	Votes	%	∆%
Alliance	Raja Nong Chik Raja Ishak	4,876	65.42	▼16.04
Socialist Front	Hew Kon Fah	2,577	34.58	▲34.58
Total valid votes		7,453	100.00	
Total rejected ballots		484		
Unreturned ballots		0		
Turnout		7,937	81.40	▲9.09
Registered electors		9,751		
Majority		2,299	30.84	▼37.34
Alliance hold		Swing		

Selangor state election, 1959
Party	Candidate	Votes	%
Alliance	Abu Bakar Baginda	3,809	81.46
PMIP	Omar Bujang	621	13.28
Independent	Lee Siok Yew	246	5.26
Total valid votes		4,676	100.00
Total rejected ballots		208	
Unreturned ballots		0	
Turnout		4,884	72.31
Registered electors		6,754	
Majority		3,188	68.18
This was a new constituency created.
