= Adhif Syan Abdullah =

Malaysian politician

- اضيف شان عبدالله

Member of the Selangor State Legislative Assembly for Dengkil
- In office 9 May 2018 – 12 August 2023
- Preceded by: Shahrum Mohd Sharif (BN–UMNO)
- Succeeded by: Jamil Salleh (PN–BERSATU)
- Majority: 6,934 (2018)

Personal details
- Born: Adhif Syan bin Abdullah; 26 August 1981 (age 44) Pulau Meranti, Sepang, Selangor, Malaysia
- Citizenship: Malaysian
- Party: Malaysian United Indigenous Party (BERSATU) (–2024); People's Justice Party (PKR) (since 2024)
- Other political affiliations: Pakatan Harapan (PH) (–2020, since 2024); Perikatan Nasional (PN) (2020–2024)
- Occupation: Politician

Adhif Syan bin Abdullah (born 26 August 1981) is a Malaysian politician who served as Member of the Selangor State Legislative Assembly (MLA) for Dengkil from May 2018 to August 2023. He is a member of the People's Justice Party (PKR), a component party of the Pakatan Harapan (PH) coalition. He was a member of the Malaysian United Indigenous Party (BERSATU), a component party of the Perikatan Nasional (PN) and formerly PH coalitions.

On 11 March 2024, Adhif Syan officially left BERSATU for PKR alongside former Member of the Supreme Council of BERSATU Muhammad Faiz Na'aman.

== Controversies and issues ==
Adhif Syan was arrested by the police along with several officials from the federal ministry in a raid on a condominium hosting a fun party on 12 January 2020 at around 1.30am. He was found drug negative when a pathology test was performed.

== Election results ==
Selangor State Legislative Assembly
Year	Constituency	Candidate	Votes	Pct	Opponent(s)	Votes	Pct	Ballots cast	Majority	Turnout
2018	N55 Dengkil	Adhif Syan Abdullah (BERSATU)	21,172	48.30%	Shahrum Mohd Sharif (UMNO)	14,238	32.48%	44,423	6,934	88.03%
2018	N55 Dengkil	Adhif Syan Abdullah (BERSATU)	21,172	48.30%	Yusmi Haniff Ariffin (PAS)	8,422	19.21%	44,423	6,934	88.03%
