= Rizam Ismail =

Malaysian politician

Yang Berhormat Dato' Rizam Ismail DPMS PMW MLA
- رِزَام إِسْمَاعِيل
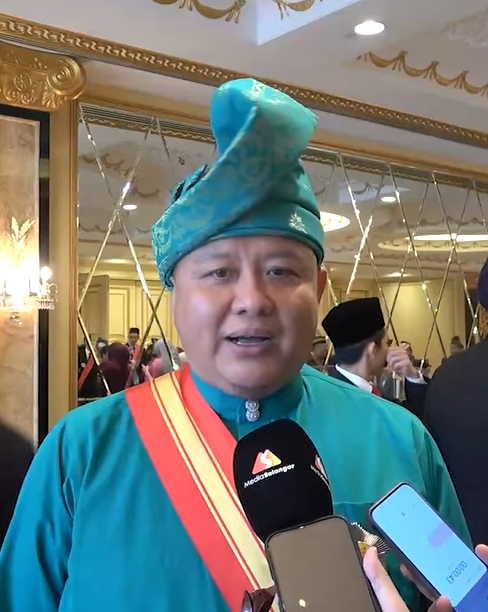

Member of the Selangor State Executive Council
- Incumbent
- Assumed office 21 August 2023
- Monarch: Sharafuddin
- Menteri Besar: Amirudin Shari
- Portfolio: Rural and Regional Development, Traditional Village Sustainability, National Unity, Consumer Affairs & Cooperatives
- Preceded by: Borhan Aman Shah (Malay Culture, Heritage, Rural Development and Traditional Village); Siti Mariah Mahmud (National Unity)
- Constituency: Sungai Air Tawar

Political Secretary to the Minister of Investment, Trade and Industry
- In office 5 April 2023 – 20 August 2023
- Monarch: Abdullah
- Prime Minister: Anwar Ibrahim
- Minister: Tengku Zafrul Aziz
- Preceded by: Position established
- Succeeded by: Zainuri Zainal

Political Secretary to the Minister of International Trade and Industry
- In office 27 January 2023 – 5 April 2023
- Monarch: Abdullah
- Prime Minister: Anwar Ibrahim
- Minister: Tengku Zafrul Aziz
- Preceded by: Muhammad Hilman Idham
- Succeeded by: Position abolished

State Leader of the Opposition of Selangor
- In office 26 June 2018 – 23 June 2023
- Monarch: Sharafuddin
- Menteri Besar: Amirudin Shari
- Preceded by: Mohd Shamsudin Lias
- Succeeded by: Azmin Ali
- Constituency: Sungai Air Tawar

Member of the Selangor State Legislative Assembly for Sungai Air Tawar
- Incumbent
- Assumed office 9 May 2018
- Preceded by: Kamarol Zaki Abdul Malik (BN–UMNO)
- Majority: 1,440 (2018); 846 (2023)

Personal details
- Born: Rizam bin Ismail; 30 January 1981 (age 45) Selangor, Malaysia
- Party: United Malays National Organisation (UMNO)
- Other political affiliations: Barisan Nasional (BN)

Rizam bin Ismail (Jawi: رِزَام إِسْمَاعِيل, Malay pronunciation: [rizam]; born 30 January 1981) is a Malaysian politician who has served as Member of the Selangor State Executive Council (EXCO) in the Pakatan Harapan (PH) state administration under Menteri Besar Amirudin Shari since August 2023 and Political Secretary to the Minister of Investment, Trade and Industry Tengku Zafrul Aziz from April to August 2023 as well as Member of the Selangor State Legislative Assembly (MLA) for Sungai Air Tawar since May 2018. He previously served as the Leader of the Opposition of Selangor from June 2018 to June 2023 and Political Secretary to the Minister of International Trade and Industry Tengku Zafrul from January to April 2023. He is a member of the United Malay National Organisation (UMNO), a component party of the Barisan Nasional (BN) coalition. He is also presently the sole Selangor BN and UMNO EXCO Member, the first one since 2008 as well as one of the only two BN and UMNO Selangor MLAs alongside Dusun Tua MLA Johan Abd Aziz.

== Election results ==
Selangor State Legislative Assembly
Year	Constituency	Candidate	Votes	Pct	Opponent(s)	Votes	Pct	Ballots cast	Majority	Turnout
2018	N01 Sungai Air Tawar	Rizam Ismail (UMNO)	5,437	40.71%	Zamri Yahya (PAS)	3,997	29.93%	13,605	1,440	83.60%
2018	N01 Sungai Air Tawar	Rizam Ismail (UMNO)	5,437	40.71%	Mohd Hamizar Sulaiman (BERSATU)	3,921	29.36%	13,605	1,440	83.60%
2023	N01 Sungai Air Tawar	Rizam Ismail (UMNO)	7,870	52.84%	Mohamad Zaidi Selamat (BERSATU)	7,024	47.16%	14,986	846	74.83%

== Honours ==
- Federal Territory (Malaysia)
  - Commander of the Order of the Territorial Crown (PMW) – Datuk (2021)
- Selangor
  - Commander of the Order of the Crown of Selangor (DPMS) – Dato' (2025)
