= Silam (federal constituency) =

Federal constituency in Sabah, Malaysia

Sabah constituency

Defunct federal constituency
- Legislature: Dewan Rakyat
- Constituency created: 1974
- Constituency abolished: 2019
- First contested: 1974
- Last contested: 2018

Silam was a federal constituency in Sabah, Malaysia, that has been represented in the Dewan Rakyat from 1974 to 2019.

The federal constituency was created in the 1974 redistribution and is mandated to return a single member to the Dewan Rakyat under the first past the post voting system.

== History ==
It was abolished in 2019 when it was redistributed

=== Representation history ===
Members of Parliament for Silam
Parliament	No	Years	Member	Party	Vote Share
Constituency created, renamed from Darvel
4th	P128	1974-1978	Mohd. Salleh Abdullah (محمد. صالح عبدالله)	BN (USNO)	Uncontested
5th	P128	1978-1982	Sakaran Dandai (ساکران محمد هاشم دانداي)	BN (USNO)	6,070; 51.66%
6th	P128	1982-1986	Abdillah Abdul Hamid (عبدي الله عبدالحميد)	Independent	9,676; 54.38%
7th	P152	1986-1990	Railey Jeffrey (رايليي جيففريي)	BN (USNO)	4,299; 45.74%
8th	P152	1990-1995	Railey Jeffrey (رايليي جيففريي)	BN (UMNO)	10,322; 55.26%
9th	P163	1995-1999	Railey Jeffrey (رايليي جيففريي)	BN (UMNO)	15,815; 70.13%
10th	P163	1999-2004	Railey Jeffrey (رايليي جيففريي)	BN (UMNO)	14,629; 64.33%
11th	P188	2004-2008	Samsu Baharun Abdul Rahman (سمسو بهارون عبدالرحمن)	BN (UMNO)	16,613; 73.91%
12th	P188	2008-2013	Salleh Kalbi (صالح كلبي)	BN (UMNO)	18,111; 68.52%
13th	P188	2013-2018	Nasrun Mansur (نسرون منصور)	BN (UMNO)	23,058; 59.85%
14th	P188	2018-2021	Mohamaddin Ketapi (محمدين كتاڤي)	WARISAN	23,352; 54.26%
14th	P188	2021	Mohamaddin Ketapi (محمدين كتاڤي)	Independent	23,352; 54.26%
14th	P188	2021–2022	Mohamaddin Ketapi (محمدين كتاڤي)	GRS (BERSATU)	23,352; 54.26%
14th	P188	2022	Mohamaddin Ketapi (محمدين كتاڤي)	PBM	23,352; 54.26%
Constituency renamed to Lahad Datu

=== State constituency ===
Parliamentary constituency	State constituency					
Parliamentary constituency	1967–1974	1974–1985	1985–1995	1995–2004	2004–2020	2020–present
Silam		Kunak				
Silam		Lahad Datu				
Silam		Semporna				
Silam					Tungku	

=== Historical boundaries ===
State Constituency	Area			
State Constituency	1974	1984	1994	2003
Kunak	Bubul; Bugaya; Kunak; Pulau Timbuan Mata; Sulabayan	Bubul; Bugaya; Kunak; Mandai; Pulau Timbuan Mata	Bubul; Bugaya; Kunak; Lihak-Lihak; Mandai	Kampung Getah; Kampung Kadazan; Kampung Simpang Empat; Kunak; Madai
Lahad Datu	FELDA Sahabat; Lahad Datu; Sepagaya; Silam; Ulu Segama			Kampung Dewata; Lahad Datu; Sepagaya; Silam; Taman Fajar
Semporna	Kampung Sum-Sum; Pulau Bum-Bum; Pulau Karindingan; Pulau Omadal; Semporna			
Tungku				Bukit Belacon; FELDA Sahabat; Pulau Tambisan; Silabukan; Ulu Segama

== Election results ==
Malaysian general election, 2018
Party	Candidate	Votes	%	∆%
Sabah Heritage Party	Mohammadin Ketapi	23,352	54.26	▲54.26
BN	Nasrun Mansur	16,951	39.38	▼20.47
PAS	Ramli Pataruddin	1,431	3.32	▲3.32
Sabah People's Hope Party	Siti Shazianti Ajak	1,306	3.03	▲3.03
Total valid votes		43,040	100.00	
Total rejected ballots		1,079		
Unreturned ballots		175		
Turnout		44,294	72.68	▼4.09
Registered electors		60,942		
Majority		6,401	14.87	▼19.88
Sabah Heritage Party gain from BN		Swing		?
Source(s) "His Majesty's Government Gazette - Notice of Contested Election, Parliament for the State of Sabah [P.U. (B) 246/2018]" (PDF). Attorney General's Chambers of Malaysia. 3 May 2018. "Federal Government Gazette - Results of Contested Election and Statements of the Poll after the Official Addition of Votes, Parliamentary Constituencies for the State of Sabah [P.U. (B) 320/2018]" (PDF). Attorney General's Chambers of Malaysia. 28 May 2018.

Malaysian general election, 2013
Party	Candidate	Votes	%	∆%
BN	Nasrun Mansur	23,058	59.85	▼8.67
PKR	Badrulamin Bahron	9,671	25.10	▲25.10
Independent	Dumi Masdal	4,959	12.87	▲12.87
STAR	Apas @ Nawawie Saking	841	2.18	▲2.18
Total valid votes		38,529	100.00	
Total rejected ballots		1,077		
Unreturned ballots		57		
Turnout		39,663	76.77	▲13.40
Registered electors		51,662		
Majority		13,387	34.75	▼2.29
BN hold		Swing		
Source(s) "Federal Government Gazette - Notice of Contested Election, Parliament for the State of Sabah [P.U. (B) 183/2013]" (PDF). Attorney General's Chambers of Malaysia. 26 April 2013. "Federal Government Gazette - Results of Contested Election and Statements of the Poll after the Official Addition of Votes, Parliamentary Constituencies for the State of Sabah [P.U. (B) 224/2013]" (PDF). Attorney General's Chambers of Malaysia. 22 May 2013.

Malaysian general election, 2008
Party	Candidate	Votes	%	∆%
BN	Salleh Kalbi	18,111	68.52	▼5.39
PKR	Hashbullah Imam Ohang	8,319	31.48	▲5.39
Total valid votes		26,430	100.00	
Total rejected ballots		989		
Unreturned ballots		138		
Turnout		27,557	63.37	▲3.56
Registered electors		43,488		
Majority		9,792	37.04	▼10.78
BN hold		Swing		

Malaysian general election, 2004
Party	Candidate	Votes	%	∆%
BN	Samsu Baharun Abdul Rahman	16,613	73.91	▲9.58
PKR	Samsuri Baharuddin	5,865	26.09	▼9.58
Total valid votes		22,478	100.00	
Total rejected ballots		1,517		
Unreturned ballots		146		
Turnout		24,141	59.81	▲5.15
Registered electors		40,362		
Majority		10,748	47.82	▲19.16
BN hold		Swing		

Malaysian general election, 1999
Party	Candidate	Votes	%	∆%
BN	Railey Jeffrey	14,629	64.33	▼5.80
PKR	Badrulamin Bahron	8,110	35.67	▲35.67
Total valid votes		22,739	100.00	
Total rejected ballots		306		
Unreturned ballots		99		
Turnout		23,144	54.66	▼3.66
Registered electors		42,341		
Majority		6,519	28.66	▼11.60
BN hold		Swing		

Malaysian general election, 1995
Party	Candidate	Votes	%	∆%
BN	Railey Jeffrey	15,815	70.13	▲14.87
PBS	Abdullah Minun Sahirun	6,737	29.87	▲29.87
Total valid votes		22,552	100.00	
Total rejected ballots		424		
Unreturned ballots		81		
Turnout		23,057	58.32	▼0.59
Registered electors		39,537		
Majority		9,078	40.26	▲29.27
BN hold		Swing		

Malaysian general election, 1990
Party	Candidate	Votes	%	∆%
BN	Railey Jeffrey	10,322	55.26	▲9.52
Independent	Mohammadin Ketapi	8,269	44.27	▲44.27
Independent	Hassan Malempeng	89	0.48	▲0.48
Total valid votes		18,680	100.00	
Total rejected ballots		180		
Unreturned ballots		0		
Turnout		18,860	58.91	▲15.92
Registered electors		32,015		
Majority		2,053	10.99	▼15.64
BN hold		Swing		

Malaysian general election, 1986
Party	Candidate	Votes	%	∆%
BN	Railey Jeffrey	4,299	45.74	▲1.30
Independent	Mohd Yusof Yahya	1,796	19.11	▲19.11
Independent	Madris Lee Buati	1,271	13.52	▲13.52
Independent	Mohd Jhastu Batu Elas	1,054	11.21	▲11.21
Independent	Zamrin Ismail @ Jamut	979	10.42	▲10.41
Total valid votes		9,399	100.00	
Total rejected ballots		115		
Unreturned ballots		0		
Turnout		9,514	42.99	▼24.22
Registered electors		22,130		
Majority		2,503	26.63	▲16.65
BN gain from Independent		Swing		?

Malaysian general election, 1982
Party	Candidate	Votes	%	∆%
Independent	Abdillah Abdul Hamid	9,676	54.38	▲54.38
BN	Sakaran Dandai	7,899	44.40	▼7.26
Independent	Ismail Rugasan	217	1.22	▲1.22
Total valid votes		17,792	100.00	
Total rejected ballots		448		
Unreturned ballots		0		
Turnout		18,240	67.21	▲3.69
Registered electors		27,138		
Majority		1,777	9.98	▼8.70
Independent gain from BN		Swing		?

Malaysian general election, 1978
Party	Candidate	Votes	%	∆%
BN	Sakaran Dandai	6,070	51.66	▲51.66
Independent	Mohamed Shakir Pengiran Abdullah	3,875	32.98	▲32.98
Independent	Abu Bakar Mohamed Hassan	1,581	13.45	▲13.45
PUSAKA	Tadus Udin	225	1.91	▲1.91
Total valid votes		11,751	100.00	
Total rejected ballots		600		
Unreturned ballots		0		
Turnout		12,351	63.52	
Registered electors		19,445		
Majority		2,195	18.68	
BN hold		Swing		

Malaysian general election, 1974
Party	Candidate	Votes	%
On the nomination day, Mohd. Salleh Abdullah won uncontested.
BN	Mohd. Salleh Abdullah		
Total valid votes			100.00
Total rejected ballots			
Unreturned ballots			
Turnout			
Registered electors		14,241	
Majority			
This was a new constituency created.
