= Abdul Rahman Bakri =

Malaysian politician

Yang Berbahagia Datuk Abdul Rahman Bakri DMSM
- عبدالرحمن بکري

Member of the Malaysian Parliament for Sabak Bernam
- In office 8 March 2008 – 11 October 2012
- Preceded by: Mat Yasir Ikhsan (BN–UMNO)
- Succeeded by: Mohd Fasiah Mohd Fakeh (BN–UMNO)
- Majority: 1,335 (2008)

Member of the Selangor State Legislative Assembly for Sungai Air Tawar
- In office 21 March 2004 – 8 March 2008
- Preceded by: Abd Jalil Bajuri (PAS)
- Succeeded by: Raja Ideris Raja Ahmad (BN–UMNO)
- Majority: 2,153 (2004)

Personal details
- Born: 10 November 1965 (age 60) Selangor, Malaysia
- Party: United Malays National Organisation (UMNO)
- Other political affiliations: Barisan Nasional (BN)
- Occupation: Politician

Datuk Abdul Rahman Bakri (born 10 November 1965) is a Malaysian politician who served as the Member of Parliament (MP) for Sabak Bernam from March 2008 to his imprisonment in October 2012 as well as Member of the Selangor State Legislative Assembly (MLA) for Sungai Air Tawar from March 2004 to March 2008. He is a member of the United Malays National Organisation (UMNO), a component party of the Barisan Nasional (BN) coalition.

== Controversy ==
In November 2009, Abdul Rahman was charged with eight counts of misappropriating public funds while a member of the Selangor State Assembly. He pleaded not guilty to the charges, but in March 2012 was convicted and sentenced to six years imprisonment. His conviction was upheld on appeal. His parliamentary career ended with his conviction and imprisonment on corruption charge.

== Election results ==
Selangor State Legislative Assembly
Year	Constituency	Candidate	Votes	Pct	Opponent(s)	Votes	Pct	Ballots cast	Majority	Turnout
2004	N01 Sungai Air Tawar	Abdul Rahman Bakri (UMNO)	5,569	61.98%	Abd Jalil Bajuri (PAS)	3,416	38.02%	9,283	2,153	73.61%

Parliament of Malaysia
Year	Constituency	Candidate	Votes	Pct	Opponent(s)	Votes	Pct	Ballots cast	Majority	Turnout
2008	P092 Sabak Bernam	Abdul Rahman Bakri (UMNO)	12,055	52.93%	Badrulamin Bahron (PKR)	10,720	47.07%	23,581	1,335	75.14%
2022	P092 Sabak Bernam	Abdul Rahman Bakri (UMNO)	12,917	31.52%	Kalam Salan (BERSATU)	17,973	43.86%	40,977	5,056	79.40%
2022	P092 Sabak Bernam	Abdul Rahman Bakri (UMNO)	12,917	31.52%	Shamsul Maarif Ismail (AMANAH)	9,627	23.49%	40,977	5,056	79.40%
2022	P092 Sabak Bernam	Abdul Rahman Bakri (UMNO)	12,917	31.52%	Eizlan Yusof (PEJUANG)	460	1.12%	40,977	5,056	79.40%

== Honours ==
- Malacca
  - Companion Class I of the Exalted Order of Malacca (DMSM) – Datuk (2009)
