= Karim Mansor =

Malaysian politician

Yang Berbahagia Dato' Karim Mansor DPMS PJK
- کريم منصور

Member of the Selangor State Executive Council
- In office 31 March 2004 – 2006
- Succeeded by: Elizabeth Wong Keat Ping

Member of the Selangor State Legislative Assembly for Tanjong Sepat
- In office 21 March 2004 – 5 May 2013
- Preceded by: Constituency created
- Succeeded by: Mohd Haslin Hassan (PAS)
- Majority: 6,077 (2004); 2,374 (2008)

Personal details
- Born: 6 January 1958 (age 68) Tanjung Sepat, Selangor, Federation of Malaya
- Party: United Malays National Organisation (UMNO)
- Other political affiliations: Barisan Nasional (BN); Perikatan Nasional (PN); Muafakat Nasional (MN)
- Education: National University of Malaysia; University of Malaya
- Occupation: Politician
- Website: http://dun.selangor.gov.my/v2/adun/karim-mansor

Karim bin Mansor is a Malaysian politician. He served as Member of the Selangor State Executive Council (EXCO) in the Barisan Nasional (BN) state administration under former Menteri Besar Khir Toyo as well as Member of the Selangor State Legislative Assembly (MLA) for Tanjong Sepat from March 2004 to March 2008. He is a local leader who initiated the popular "homestay" project in Tanjung Sepat and created a business oriented kampung for the benefits of the people in the Tanjung Sepat and Morib area.

== Election results ==
Selangor State Legislative Assembly
Year	Constituency	Candidate	Votes	Pct	Opponent(s)	Votes	Pct	Ballots cast	Majority	Turnout
2004	N54 Tanjong Sepat	Karim Mansor (UMNO)	9,839	72.34%	Sukiran Sarman (PAS)	3,762	27.66%	13,896	6,077	76.71%
2008	N54 Tanjong Sepat	Karim Mansor (UMNO)	8,297	58.35%	Mohd Haslin Hassan (PAS)	5,923	41.65%	14,517	2,374	81.43%
2018	N54 Tanjong Sepat	Karim Mansor (UMNO)	7,124	33.56%	Borhan Aman Shah (PKR)	9,828	46.30%	21,557	2,704	88.81%
2018	N54 Tanjong Sepat	Karim Mansor (UMNO)	7,124	33.56%	Mohd Haslin Hassan (PAS)	4,273	20.13%	21,557	2,704	88.81%

== Honours ==
- Selangor
  - Knight Commander of the Order of the Crown of Selangor (DPMS) – Dato' (2002)
  - Recipient of the Meritorious Service Medal (PJK) (1997)
