= Mohd Haslin Hassan =

Malaysian politician

Member of the Selangor State Legislative Assembly for Tanjong Sepat
- In office 5 May 2013 – 9 May 2018
- Preceded by: Karim Mansor (BN–UMNO)
- Succeeded by: Borhan Aman Shah (PH–PKR)
- Majority: 682 (2013)

Personal details
- Party: Malaysian Islamic Party (PAS)
- Other political affiliations: Barisan Alternatif (BA) (1999–2004); Pakatan Rakyat (PR) (2008–2015); Gagasan Sejahtera (GS) (2018–2020); Perikatan Nasional (PN) (2020–present)
- Occupation: Engineer

Mohd Haslin bin Hassan is a Malaysian politician and Engineer. He served as Member of the Selangor State Legislative Assembly (MLA) for Tanjong Sepat from May 2013 to May 2018. He is a member of Malaysian Islamic Party (PAS), a component party of Perikatan Nasional (PN) coalitions, formerly Pakatan Rakyat (PR) coalitions and Gagasan Sejahtera (GS) coalitions.

== Election results ==
Selangor State Legislative Assembly
Year	Constituency	Candidate	Votes	Pct	Opponent(s)	Votes	Pct	Ballots cast	Majority	Turnout
2004	N55 Dengkil	Mohd Haslin Hassan (PAS)	4,028	23.29%	Suhaimi Mohd Ghazali (UMNO)	12,336	71.32%	17,730	8,308	74.83%
2004	N55 Dengkil	Mohd Haslin Hassan (PAS)	4,028	23.29%	Husin Dahlan (PKR)	932	5.39%	17,730	8,308	74.83%
2008	N54 Tanjong Sepat	Mohd Haslin Hassan (PAS)	5,923	41.65%	Karim Mansor (UMNO)	8,297	58.35%	14,517	2,374	81.43%
2013	N54 Tanjong Sepat	Mohd Haslin Hassan (PAS)	10,129	51.43%	Nisman Yusof (UMNO)	9,447	47.97%	20,053	682	90.28%
2013	N54 Tanjong Sepat	Mohd Haslin Hassan (PAS)	10,129	51.43%	Muventen Munusamy (IND)	117	0.59%	20,053	682	90.28%
2018	N54 Tanjong Sepat	Mohd Haslin Hassan (PAS)	4,273	20.13%	Borhan Aman Shah (PKR)	9,828	46.30%	21,557	2,704	88.81%
2018	N54 Tanjong Sepat	Mohd Haslin Hassan (PAS)	4,273	20.13%	Karim Mansor (UMNO)	7,124	33.56%	21,557	2,704	88.81%
