= Jamil Salleh =

Malaysian politician and civil servant

Yang Berhormat Dato' Sri Jamil Salleh SSAP DGSM DMSM DSM BKT MLA

Member of the Selangor State Legislative Assembly for Dengkil
- Incumbent
- Assumed office 12 August 2023
- Preceded by: Adhif Syan Abdullah (PH–BERSATU)
- Majority: 381 (2023)

Personal details
- Born: Jamil bin Salleh; 1959 (age 66–67) Malaysia
- Citizenship: Malaysian
- Party: Malaysian United Indigenous Party (BERSATU)
- Other political affiliations: Perikatan Nasional (PN)
- Spouse: Asmah Samat
- Children: 4
- Education: University of Malaya (Bachelor of Arts in anthropology and sociology National Institute of Public Administration (Diploma in public administration); Asian Institute of Technology; Royal Institute of Public Administration; International United Kingdom; Madinah Institute for Leadership and Entrepreneurship; Madinah, Saudi Arabia; Saïd Business School, University of Oxford
- Occupation: Politician; civil servant

Jamil bin Salleh (born 1959) is a Malaysian politician and civil servant who has served as Member of the Selangor State Legislative Assembly (MLA) for Dengkil since August 2023. He is a member of the Malaysian United Indigenous Party (BERSATU), a component party of the Perikatan Nasional (PN) coalition.

== Career ==
He served as the Secretary-General of the Ministry of Domestic Trade and Consumer Affairs (KPDNHEP) from 2016 to 2019, of the Ministry of Youth and Sports (KBS) from 2013 to 2016, Deputy Secretary of the National Key Results Area (NKRA) Division of the Ministry of Home Affairs (KDN) from 2009 to 2010, Director of Planning, Development and Logistics of the Prisons Department from 2000 to 2009 and held various management positions in KBS, KDN and the Ministry of Defence (MINDEF) from 1983 to 1999.

Besides government ministries and departments, Jamil chaired a wide range of non-governmental organisations (NGOs) and companies like the UTeM Chancellor Foundation, Human Resource Development Corporation (HRDCorp), Companies Commission of Malaysia (SSM), Rakyat Holdings, Bank Rakyat, Malaysian Stadium Corporation (PSM), Malaysian Athlete Welfare Foundation (YAKEB), International Youth Center (IYC) and served as a Member of the Board of Sepang International Circuit (SIC) Sdn Bhd, the Malay World Islamic World (DMDI) as well as advising the Malaysian Deaf Sports Association (MsDeaf).

== Political career ==
=== Member of the Selangor State Legislative Assembly (since 2023) ===
==== 2023 Selangor state election ====
In the 2023 Selangor state election, Jamil was one of the two candidates PN announced the earliest before the state election alongside Sungai Pelek PN candidate Suhaimi Mohd Ghazali who eventually lost to Lwi Kian Keong of Pakatan Harapan (PH). Jamil made his electoral debut after being nominated by PN to contest for the Dengkil state seat. Jamil won the seat and was elected to the Selangor State Legislative Assembly as the Dengkil MLA for the first term after narrowly defeating Noorazli Said of Barisan Nasional (BN), Darren Ong Chung Lee of Parti Sosialis Malaysia (PSM) and Mohd Daud Leong Abdullah of Parti Utama Rakyat (PUR) by a majority of only 381 votes. However, due to the narrow victory, there was initially a plan by PH to challenge by filing an election petition against the results but subsequently PH did not go ahead with the plan.

During the campaigning period of the state election, Jamil revealed that he had a team namely the 'DSJ (Datuk Seri Jamil) Team' composed of Dengkil residents who were helped by others who stay outside Dengkil to support his campaign. He also denied the allegations after being labelled as an 'election tourist' and 'foreign resident' living outside Dengkil. He said he had resided in Dengkil for more than 5 years and been in the Klang Valley for more than 40 years. As the Dengkil MLA, he pledged to make his experience in the KBS and KPDNHEP as a balancing force to give ideas and advices to ensure the plans of the state government of Selangor were on track. He also stressed that he maintained good relations and ties on the government level and this gave him the advantage to develop Dengkil and Selangor.

== Election results ==
Selangor State Legislative Assembly
Year	Constituency	Candidate	Votes	Pct	Opponent(s)	Votes	Pct	Ballots cast	Majority	Turnout
2023	N55 Dengkil	Jamil Salleh (BERSATU)	33,565	48.51%	Noorazli Said (UMNO)	33,184	47.95%	69,165	381	73.63%
2023	N55 Dengkil	Jamil Salleh (BERSATU)	33,565	48.51%	Darren Ong Chung Lee (PSM)	1,782	2.58%	69,165	381	73.63%
2023	N55 Dengkil	Jamil Salleh (BERSATU)	33,565	48.51%	Mohd Daud Leong Abdullah (PUR)	668	0.97%	69,165	381	73.63%

== Honours ==
- Malacca
  - Grand Commander of the Exalted Order of Malacca (DGSM) – Datuk Seri (2018)
  - Companion of the Exalted Order of Malacca (DMSM) – Datuk (2007)
  - Member of the Exalted Order of Malacca (DSM) (2005)
  - Recipient of the Commendable Service Star (BKT)
- Pahang
  - Grand Companion of the Order of Sultan Ahmad Shah of Pahang (SSAP) – Dato' Sri (2015)
