= Muhammad Faiz Na'aman =

Malaysian politician

Member of the Malaysian United Indigenous Party Supreme Council
- In office 2016 – 7 August 2023
- President: Muhyiddin Yassin

Personal details
- Party: Malaysian United Indigenous Party (BERSATU) (2016–2023); Independent (2023–2024); People's Justice Party (PKR) (2024–present)
- Other political affiliations: Pakatan Harapan (PH) (2017–2020, 2024–present); Perikatan Nasional (PN) (2020–2023)
- Occupation: Politician, entrepreneur
- Profession: Doctor

Muhammad Faiz bin Na'aman is a Malaysian politician. He was a member of the Supreme Leadership Council of the BERSATU party, to which he was appointed in 2016. He was a member of Malaysian United Indigenous Party (BERSATU), a component party of Perikatan Nasional (PN) coalitions and is a member of People's Justice Party (PKR), a component party of Pakatan Harapan (PH).

== Education ==
Muhammad Faiz Na'aman graduated as a doctor of medicine (MBBS) from Cyberjaya University College of Medical Sciences (CUCMS), now Cyberjaya University, and has served at Kuala Lumpur Hospital. In addition, he holds a degree in Microbiology from Universiti Teknologi MARA (UiTM).

== Political career ==
Muhammad Faiz Na'aman joined the Malaysian United Indigenous Party in 2016 as part of the founding group of members.

=== Candidate for the Member of Parliament (2022) ===
In the 2022 general election, Muhammad Faiz made his electoral debut after he was nominated by PN to contest for the Bagan Datuk parliamentary seat. Muhammad Faiz contested against Ahmad Zahid Hamidi of Barisan Nasional (BN) who is also President of UMNO, Shamsul Iskandar Md. Akin of the PKR and independent candidate and former Deputy Prime Minister's son Ismail Abdul Rahman, Mohamad Tawfik Ismail. Muhammad Faiz failed to gain the seat, receiving 8,822 votes.

=== PKR ===
Just five days before the 2023 state elections, on 7 August 2023, Muhammad Faiz quit BERSATU, saying that it was a voluntary decision and that he could no longer represent the party leadership because of his differing opinions regarding the management and direction of the party.

He officially joined PKR along with former Member of the Selangor State Legislative Assembly (MLA) for Dengkil, Adhif Syan Abdullah on 11 March 2024.

== Election results ==
Parliament of Malaysia
Year	Constituency	Candidate	Votes	Pct	Opponent(s)	Votes	Pct	Ballots cast	Majority	Turnout
2022	P075 Bagan Datuk	Muhammad Faiz Na'aman (BERSATU)	8,822	21.08%	Ahmad Zahid Hamidi (UMNO)	16,578	39.61%	42,695	348	73.40%
2022	P075 Bagan Datuk	Muhammad Faiz Na'aman (BERSATU)	8,822	21.08%	Shamsul Iskandar Mohd Akin (PKR)	16,230	38.78%	42,695	348	73.40%
2022	P075 Bagan Datuk	Muhammad Faiz Na'aman (BERSATU)	8,822	21.08%	Mohamed Tawfik Ismail (IND)	226	0.54%	42,695	348	73.40%
