= Tanjong Sepat (state constituency) =

State constituency in Selangor, Malaysia

Tanjong Sepat (N54)
Selangor constituency

State constituency
- Legislature: Selangor State Legislative Assembly
MLA
Borhan Aman Shah
PH
- Constituency created: 2003
- First contested: 2004
- Last contested: 2023

Demographics
- Electors (2023): 32,312

Tanjong Sepat is a state constituency in Selangor, Malaysia, that has been represented in the Selangor State Legislative Assembly since 2004.

The state constituency was created in the 2003 redistribution and is mandated to return a single member to the Selangor State Legislative Assembly under the first past the post voting system.

== Demographics ==
As of 2020, Tanjong Papat has a population of 20,229 people.

Ethnic breakdown of Tanjong Sepat's electorate as of 2023
1. Malay (57.8%)
2. Chinese (26.2%)
3. Indian (11.7%)
4. Other ethnicities (4.30%)

== History ==
=== Polling districts ===
According to the federal gazette issued on 30 March 2018, the Tanjong Sepat constituency is divided into 14 polling districts.

State constituency	Polling Districts	Code	Location
Tanjong Sepat (N54）	Bukit Bangkung	113/54/01	SRA Kampung Bukit Bangkong
Tanjong Sepat (N54）	Sungai Rawang	113/54/02	SK Sungai Rawang
Tanjong Sepat (N54）	Tanjong Rhu	113/54/03	SJK (T) Teluk Merbau
Tanjong Sepat (N54）	Tanjong Sepat Tempatan 1	113/54/04	SJK (C) Tanjong Sepat
Tanjong Sepat (N54）	Tanjong Sepat Tempatan 2	113/54/05	SMK Tanjong Sepat
Tanjong Sepat (N54）	Tanjong Sepat Tempatan 3	113/53/06	Dewan Orang Ramai Tanjong Sepat
Tanjong Sepat (N54）	Tanjong Sepat Tempatan 4	113/54/07	Dewan Orang Ramai Tanjong Sepat
Tanjong Sepat (N54）	Tanjong Sepat Tempatan 5	113/54/08	SJK (C) Tanjong Sepat
Tanjong Sepat (N54）	Tanjong Sepat 6	113/54/09	SK Tanjung Sepat
Tanjong Sepat (N54）	Kundang	113/54/10	SRA Kampung Kundang
Tanjong Sepat (N54）	Batu Laut	113/54/11	SK Batu Laut
Tanjong Sepat (N54）	Kampung Endah	113/54/12	SK Kampung Endah
Tanjong Sepat (N54）	Sungai Lang	113/54/13	SK Sungai Lang
Tanjong Sepat (N54）	Sungai Kelambu	113/54/14	SK Sungai Kelambu

=== Representation history ===
Members of the Legislative Assembly for Tanjong Sepat
Assembly	No	Years	Member	Party
Constituency created from Batu Laut
11th	N54	2004–2008	Karim Mansor	BN (UMNO)
12th	N54	2008–2013	Karim Mansor	BN (UMNO)
13th	N54	2013–2018	Mohd Haslin Hassan	PR (PAS)
14th	N54	2018–2023	Borhan Aman Shah	PH (PKR)
15th	N54	2023–present	Borhan Aman Shah	PH (PKR)

== Election results ==
Selangor state election, 2023
Party	Candidate	Votes	%	∆%
PH	Borhan Aman Shah	13,860	55.01	▲8.71
PN	Sabirin Marsono	11,336	44.99	▲44.99
Total valid votes		25,196	100.00	
Total rejected ballots		189		
Unreturned ballots		18		
Turnout		25,403	78.62	▼10.19
Registered electors		32,312		
Majority		2,524	10.02	▼2.72
PH hold		Swing		

Selangor state election, 2018
Party	Candidate	Votes	%	∆%
PKR	Borhan Aman Shah	9,828	46.30	▲46.30
BN	Karim Mansor	7,124	33.56	▼14.41
PAS	Mohd Haslin Hassan	4,273	20.13	▼31.30
Total valid votes		21,225	100.00	
Total rejected ballots		267		
Unreturned ballots		65		
Turnout		21,557	88.81	▼1.47
Registered electors		24,272		
Majority		2,704	12.74	▲9.28
PKR gain from PAS		Swing		?

Selangor state election, 2013
Party	Candidate	Votes	%	∆%
PAS	Mohd Haslin Hassan	10,129	51.43	▲9.78
BN	Nisman Yusof	9,447	47.97	▼10.38
Independent	Muventen Munusamy	117	0.59	▲0.59
Total valid votes		19,693	100.00	
Total rejected ballots		307		
Unreturned ballots		53		
Turnout		20,053	90.28	▲8.85
Registered electors		22,213		
Majority		682	3.46	▼13.24
PAS gain from BN		Swing		?
Source(s) "Federal Government Gazette - Notice of Contested Election, State Legislative Assembly for the State of Selangor [P.U. (B) 192/2013]" (PDF). Attorney General's Chambers of Malaysia. 26 April 2013. Archived from the original (PDF) on 2019-12-29. "Federal Government Gazette - Results of Contested Election and Statements of the Poll after the Official Addition of Votes, State Constituencies for the State of Selangor [P.U. (B) 233/2013]". Attorney General's Chambers of Malaysia. 22 May 2013. Archived from the original (PDF) on 2018-10-02.

Selangor state election, 2008
Party	Candidate	Votes	%	∆%
BN	Karim Mansor	8,297	58.35	▼13.99
PAS	Mohd Haslin Hassan	5,923	41.65	▲13.99
Total valid votes		14,220	100.00	
Total rejected ballots		287		
Unreturned ballots		10		
Turnout		14,517	81.43	▲4.72
Registered electors		17,827		
Majority		2,374	16.70	▼27.98
BN hold		Swing		

Selangor state election, 2004
Party	Candidate	Votes	%
BN	Karim Mansor	9,839	72.34
PAS	Sukiran Sarman	3,762	27.66
Total valid votes		13,601	100.00
Total rejected ballots		295	
Unreturned ballots		0	
Turnout		13,896	76.71
Registered electors		18,116	
Majority		6,077	44.68
This was a new constituency created.
