= Fasiah Fakeh =

Malaysian politician

Yang Berbahagia Dato' Mohamad Fasiah Mohd Fakeh DIMP KMN
- محمد فسيه بن محمد فقه

Faction represented in Dewan Rakyat
- 2013–2018: Barisan Nasional
- 2018–2019: Independent
- 2019–2020: Pakatan Harapan
- 2020: Malaysian United Indigenous Party
- 2020–2022: Perikatan Nasional

Other roles
- 2020–: Chairman of Federal Agricultural Marketing Authority (FAMA)

Personal details
- Born: Mohamad Fasiah bin Mohd. Fakeh Sabak Bernam, Selangor, Malaysia
- Citizenship: Malaysian
- Party: United Malays National Organisation (UMNO) (until 2018); Malaysian United Indigenous Party (BERSATU) (since 2019)
- Other political affiliations: Barisan Nasional (BN) (until 2018); Pakatan Harapan (PH) (2019–2020); Perikatan Nasional (PN) (since 2020)
- Education: Universiti Malaya
- Occupation: Politician

Mohamad Fasiah bin Mohd Fakeh (Jawi:محمد فسيه بن محمد فقه; is a Malaysian politician. He is chair of Federal Agricultural Marketing Authority (FAMA).

== Political career ==
In May 2013, Mohamad Fasiah first contested to become an MP in the 13th Malaysian general election and subsequently won the Sabak Bernam seat with a 1,890 majority.

He was successfully re-elected as MP for the same seat in the 14th Malaysian general election.

He resigned from UMNO to be an Independent politician in 2018.

Presently he is a member of the Malaysian United Indigenous Party or Parti Pribumi Bersatu Malaysia (BERSATU), a component of Perikatan Nasional (PN) government.

== Election results ==
Parliament of Malaysia
Year	Constituency	Candidate	Votes	Pct	Opponent(s)	Votes	Pct	Ballots cast	Majority	Turnout
2013	P092 Sabak Bernam	Mohamad Fasiah Mohd. Fakeh (UMNO)	16,510	53.04%	Abdul Aziz Bari (PKR)	14,620	46.96%	31,859	1,890	85.37%
2018	P092 Sabak Bernam	Mohamad Fasiah Mohd. Fakeh (UMNO)	12,862	38.57%	Warno Dogol (BERSATU)	11,188	33.55%	34,023	1,674	83.26%
2018	P092 Sabak Bernam	Mohamad Fasiah Mohd. Fakeh (UMNO)	12,862	38.57%	Muhammad Labib Abd Jalil (PAS)	9,300	27.89%	34,023	1,674	83.26%

== Honours ==
=== Honours of Malaysia ===
- Malaysia
  - Officer of the Order of the Defender of the Realm (KMN) (2014)
- Pahang
  - Knight Companion of the Order of the Crown of Pahang (DIMP) – Dato' (2014)
