= Salleh Kalbi =

Malaysian politician (1964–2025)

Yang Berbahagia Dato' Salleh Kalbi DIMP ADK

Member of the Malaysian Parliament for Silam, Sabah
- In office 8 March 2008 – 5 May 2013
- Preceded by: Samsu Baharun
- Succeeded by: Nasrun Mansur
- Majority: 9,792 (2008)

Personal details
- Born: 10 August 1964 Sabah, Malaysia
- Died: 13 April 2025 (aged 60) Lahad Datu, Sabah, Malaysia
- Party: United Malays National Organisation (UMNO)
- Other political affiliations: Barisan Nasional (BN)
- Occupation: Politician
- Website: sallehkalbi188.wordpress.com

Salleh bin Haji Kalbi (10 August 1964 – 13 April 2025) was a Malaysian politician who served as the Member of Parliament for the Silam constituency in Sabah from 2008 to 2013. He represented the United Malays National Organisation (UMNO), a component party of the ruling Barisan Nasional (BN) coalition.

Salleh was elected to Parliament in the 2008 general election, succeeding his UMNO colleague, Samsu Baharun, as the representative for Silam. He was not selected as a candidate by UMNO for the 2013 general election.

Salleh died in Lahad Datu, Sabah, Malaysia on 13 April 2025, at the age of 60.

== Election results ==
Parliament of Malaysia
Year	Constituency	Candidate	Votes	Pct	Opponent(s)	Votes	Pct	Ballots cast	Majority	Turnout
2008	P188 Silam	Salleh Kalbi (UMNO)	18,111	68.52%	Hashbullah Imam Ohang (PKR)	8,319	31.48%	27,557	9,792	63.37%

== Honours ==
- Sabah
  - Member of the Order of Kinabalu (ADK) (2001)
- Pahang
  - Knight Companion of the Order of the Crown of Pahang (DIMP) – Dato' (2011)
