= Federal Agricultural Marketing Authority (Malaysia) =

Malaysian government agency

- Lembaga Pemasaran Pertanian Persekutuan (FAMA)
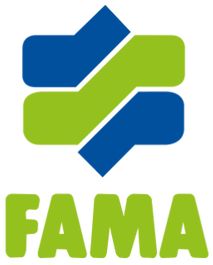

Agency overview
- Formed: 30 September 1965; 60 years ago
- Jurisdiction: Ministry of Agriculture and Food Industries
- Headquarters: Bandar Baru Selayang, Selangor, Malaysia
- Agency executive: Dato' Zainal Abidin bin Yang Razalli, Director General
- Website: www.fama.gov.my

Footnotes
- Federal Agricultural Marketing Authority on Facebook

The Federal Agricultural Marketing Authority (FAMA) is a statutory body under the Ministry of Agriculture and Food Industries. FAMA's responsibility is to improve the marketing of agro food products such as vegetables, fruits and agro-based industry products.

To drive the domestic and international marketing sector, FAMA in its role of marketing agro food products initiates to expend the market size of agro food products and increase agriculture and agro-based industry products to ensure it is available and can be obtained at affordable prices by consumers. To implement this role FAMA has been continuously intensifying efforts to enhance efficiency in the marketing chain by focusing on the following items;

- Strengthening supply through Contract Farming Program;
- Expand market access; and
- Improve the promotion of domestic and export markets.
