= Borhan Aman Shah =

Malaysian politician

Yang Berhormat Datuk Borhan Aman Shah DMSM PJK MLA
- برهان أمان شاة

Member of the Selangor State Executive Council
- Incumbent
- Assumed office 21 August 2023
- Monarch: Sharafuddin
- Menteri Besar: Amirudin Shari
- Portfolio: Housing, Sustainable Urban Development, Culture, Malay Customs & Heritage since 23 August 2023
- Preceded by: Himself (Malay Customs, Culture & Heritage)
- Constituency: Tanjong Sepat
- In office 17 September 2020 – 21 August 2023
- Monarch: Sharafuddin
- Menteri Besar: Amirudin Shari
- Portfolio: Rural and Traditional Village Development, Malay Customs, Culture and Heritage
- Preceded by: Abdul Rashid Asari (Malay Culture and Heritage); Rodziah Ismail (Rural Development and Traditional Village)
- Succeeded by: Himself (Malay Customs, Culture and Heritage)
- Constituency: Tanjong Sepat

Member of the Selangor State Legislative Assembly for Tanjong Sepat
- Incumbent
- Assumed office 9 May 2018
- Preceded by: Mohd Haslin Hassan (PR–PAS)
- Majority: 2,704 (2018); 2,524 (2023)

Personal details
- Born: Borhan bin Aman Shah; 14 May 1962 (age 64) Kampung Batu Laut, Tanjung Sepat, Selangor, Federation of Malaya (now Malaysia)
- Party: People's Justice Party (PKR)
- Other political affiliations: Pakatan Harapan (PH)
- Occupation: Politician

Borhan bin Aman Shah (born 14 May 1962) is a Malaysian politician who has served as Member of the Selangor State Executive Council (EXCO) in the Pakatan Harapan (PH) state administration under Menteri Besar Amirudin Shari since September 2020 and Member of the Selangor State Legislative Assembly (MLA) for Tanjong Sepat since May 2018. He is a member of the People's Justice Party (PKR), a component party of the PH and formerly Pakatan Rakyat (PR) coalitions. He is also the State Deputy Chairman of PH of Selangor.

== Election results ==
Selangor State Legislative Assembly
Year	Constituency	Candidate	Votes	Pct	Opponent(s)	Votes	Pct	Ballots cast	Majority	Turnout
2013	N55 Dengkil	Borhan Aman Shah (PKR)	15,484	46.23%	Shahrum Mohd Sharif (UMNO)	17,801	53.16%	33,947	2,317	88.60%
2013	N55 Dengkil	Borhan Aman Shah (PKR)	15,484	46.23%	Johan Asik (KITA)	203	0.61%	33,947	2,317	88.60%
2018	N54 Tanjong Sepat	Borhan Aman Shah (PKR)	9,828	46.30%	Karim Mansor (UMNO)	7,124	33.56%	21,557	2,704	88.11%
2018	N54 Tanjong Sepat	Borhan Aman Shah (PKR)	9,828	46.30%	Mohd Haslin Hassan (PAS)	4,273	20.13%	21,557	2,704	88.11%
2023	N54 Tanjong Sepat	Borhan Aman Shah (PKR)	13,860	55.01%	Sabirin Marsono (PAS)	11,336	44.99%	25,385	2,524	78.56%

== Honours ==
- Malacca
  - Companion of the Exalted Order of Malacca (DMSM) – Datuk (2024)
- Selangor
  - Recipient of the Meritorious Service Medal (PJK) (2010)
