= Sungai Air Tawar (state constituency) =

State constituency in Selangor

Sungai Air Tawar (N01)
Selangor constituency

State constituency
- Legislature: Selangor State Legislative Assembly
MLA
Rizam Ismail
BN
- Constituency created: 1974 (as Sungei Ayer Tawar)
- First contested: 1974
- Last contested: 2023

Demographics
- Electors (2023): 20,026

Sungai Air Tawar is a state constituency in Selangor, Malaysia, that has been represented in the Selangor State Legislative Assembly since 1974. It has been represented by Member of the State Executive Council (EXCO) Rizam Ismail of Barisan Nasional (BN) since 2018. It is also the smallest Selangor state constituency by the number of voters.

The state constituency was created in the 1974 redistribution and is mandated to return a single member to the Selangor State Legislative Assembly under the first past the post voting system.

== Demographics ==
Ethnic breakdown of Sungai Air Tawar's electorate as of 2023
1. Malay (84.3%)
2. Chinese (12.2%)
3. Indian (2.72%)
4. Other ethnicities (0.74%)

== History ==
=== Polling districts ===
According to the gazette issued on 30 March 2018, the Sungai Air Tawar constituency has a total of 15 polling districts.

State constituency	Polling districts	Code	Location
Sungai Air Tawar (N01)	Parit Baharu Baruh	092/01/01	SJK (C) Poay Chneh Parit Baru Sungai Air Tawar
Sungai Air Tawar (N01)	Sungai Tengar Utara	092/01/02	SRA Al-Ittikhadiah Sungai Tengar
Sungai Air Tawar (N01)	Sungai Air Tawar	092/01/03	SK Seri Mawar Sungai Air Tawar
Sungai Air Tawar (N01)	Sungai Bernam	092/01/04	SJK (T) Ladang Sungai Bernam
Sungai Air Tawar (N01)	Sungai Air Tawar Selatan	092/01/05	SRA Tebuk Mufrad Sungai Air Tawar
Sungai Air Tawar (N01)	Sungai Tengar Selatan	092/01/06	SK Sungai Tengar
Sungai Air Tawar (N01)	Sungai Pelong	092/01/07	SK Parit Baharu
Sungai Air Tawar (N01)	Kampung Teluk Belaga	092/01/08	SK Seri Cempaka
Sungai Air Tawar (N01)	Betting Kepah	092/01/09	SJK (C) Phooi Min Telok Rhu
Sungai Air Tawar (N01)	Kampung Teluk Rhu	092/01/10	SK Teluk Ru
Sungai Air Tawar (N01)	Simpang Empat	092/01/11	SK Simpang 4 Bagan Nakhoda Omar
Sungai Air Tawar (N01)	Kampung Sekendi	092/01/12	SK Sekendi Sabak Bernam
Sungai Air Tawar (N01)	Kampung Banting	092/01/13	SK Kampong Banting
Sungai Air Tawar (N01)	Kampung Batu 38 Buruh	092/01/14	SK Batu 38 Sabak Bernam
Sungai Air Tawar (N01)	Kampung Baharu	092/01/15	SK Kampung Baharu Sabak Bernam

=== Representation history ===
Members of the Legislative Assembly for Sungai Air Tawar
Assembly	No	Years	Member	Party
Constituency created from Sabak
Sungei Ayer Tawar
4th	N01	1974-1978	Jamaluddin Suhaimi	BN (UMNO)
5th	N01	1978-1982	Khalil Kasmijan	BN (UMNO)
6th	N01	1982-1986	Zainal Dahlan	BN (UMNO)
Sungai Air Tawar
7th	N01	1986-1990	Zainal Dahlan	BN (UMNO)
8th	N01	1990–1995	Zainal Dahlan	BN (UMNO)
9th	N01	1995–1999	Zainal Dahlan	BN (UMNO)
10th	N01	1999-2004	Mat Yasir Ikhsan	BN (UMNO)
11th	N01	2004-2008	Abdul Rahman Bakri	BN (UMNO)
12th	N01	2008-2013	Raja Ideris Raja Ahmad	BN (UMNO)
13th	N01	2013-2017	Kamarol Zaki Abdul Malik	BN (UMNO)
13th	N01	2017-2018	Vacant (Note: Vacant from 17 January 2017 until the 2018 Malaysian general election due to the incumbent died in office. No by-election was held due to the next general election was less than a year and half away.)	
14th	N01	2018–2023	Rizam Ismail	BN (UMNO)
15th	N01	2023–present	Rizam Ismail	BN (UMNO)

== Election results ==
Selangor state election, 2023
Party	Candidate	Votes	%	∆%
BN	Rizam Ismail	7,870	52.84	▲12.13
PN	Mohamad Zaidi Selamat	7,024	47.16	▲47.16
Total valid votes		14,894	100.00	
Total rejected ballots		92		
Unreturned ballots		13		
Turnout		14,999	74.90	▼8.70
Registered electors		20,026		
Majority		846	5.68	▼5.10
BN hold		Swing		

Selangor state election, 2018
Party	Candidate	Votes	%	∆%
BN	Rizam Ismail	5,437	40.71	▼14.83
PAS	Wahid Rais	3,997	29.93	▼14.53
PKR	Mohd Hamizar Sulaiman	3,921	29.36	▲29.36
Total valid votes		13,355	100.00	
Total rejected ballots		220		
Unreturned ballots		30		
Turnout		13,605	83.60	▼2.14
Registered electors		16,274		
Majority		1,440	10.78	▼0.30
BN hold		Swing		

Selangor state election, 2013
Party	Candidate	Votes	%	∆%
BN	Kamarol Zaki Abdul Malik	7,096	55.54	▲4.89
PAS	Wahid Rais	5,680	44.46	▼4.89
Total valid votes		12,776	100.00	
Total rejected ballots		194		
Unreturned ballots		52		
Turnout		13,022	85.74	▲9.12
Registered electors		15,187		
Majority		1,416	11.08	▲9.78
BN hold		Swing		
Source(s) "Federal Government Gazette - Notice of Contested Election, State Legislative Assembly for the State of Selangor [P.U. (B) 192/2013]" (PDF). Attorney General's Chambers of Malaysia. 26 April 2013. "Federal Government Gazette - Results of Contested Election and Statements of the Poll after the Official Addition of Votes, State Constituencies for the State of Selangor [P.U. (B) 233/2013]" (PDF). Attorney General's Chambers of Malaysia. 22 May 2013.

Selangor state election, 2008
Party	Candidate	Votes	%	∆%
BN	Raja Ideris Raja Ahmad	4,791	50.65	▼11.33
PAS	Azrulkhakim Suradi	4,668	49.35	▲11.33
Total valid votes		9,459	100.00	
Total rejected ballots		263		
Unreturned ballots		29		
Turnout		9,751	76.62	▲3.01
Registered electors		12,726		
Majority		123	1.30	▼22.66
BN hold		Swing		

Selangor state election, 2004
Party	Candidate	Votes	%	∆%
BN	Abdul Rahman Bakri	5,569	61.98	▲3.34
PAS	Abd. Jalil Bajuri	3,416	38.02	▼3.34
Total valid votes		8,985	100.00	
Total rejected ballots		294		
Unreturned ballots		4		
Turnout		9,283	73.61	▲5.56
Registered electors		12,611		
Majority		2,153	23.96	▲6.68
BN hold		Swing		

Selangor state election, 1999
Party	Candidate	Votes	%	∆%
BN	Mat Yasir Ikhsan	3,989	58.64	▼24.36
PAS	Abd. Jalil Bajuri	2,814	41.36	▲24.36
Total valid votes		6,803	100.00	
Total rejected ballots		226		
Unreturned ballots		5		
Turnout		7,034	68.05	▲7.25
Registered electors		10,337		
Majority		1,175	17.28	▼48.72
BN hold		Swing		

Selangor state election, 1995
Party	Candidate	Votes	%	∆%
BN	Zainal Dahlan	5,130	83.00	▼1.61
PAS	Majudim @ A Razak Dawami	1,051	17.00	▲17.00
Total valid votes		6,181	100.00	
Total rejected ballots		265		
Unreturned ballots		19		
Turnout		6,465	60.80	▼10.16
Registered electors		10,633		
Majority		4,079	66.00	▲3.22
BN hold		Swing		

Selangor state election, 1990
Party	Candidate	Votes	%	∆%
BN	Zainal Dahlan	5,191	81.39	▲2.03
S46	Mohamad Kawaid Ngadimin	1,187	18.61	▲18.61
Total valid votes		6,378	100.00	
Total rejected ballots		382		
Unreturned ballots		0		
Turnout		6,760	70.96	▲2.87
Registered electors		9,527		
Majority		4,004	62.78	▲4.06
BN hold		Swing		

Selangor state election, 1986
Party	Candidate	Votes	%	∆%
BN	Zainal Dahlan	4,929	79.36	▲0.59
PAS	Shamsuddin A Rahman	1,282	20.64	▼0.59
Total valid votes		6,211	100.00	
Total rejected ballots		210		
Unreturned ballots		0		
Turnout		6,421	68.09	▼3.41
Registered electors		9,430		
Majority		3,647	58.72	▲1.18
BN hold		Swing		

Selangor state election, 1982: Sungei Ayer Tawar
Party	Candidate	Votes	%	∆%
BN	Zainal Dahlan	4,878	78.77	▲13.44
PAS	Abdul Aziz Abdul Shukor	1,315	21.23	▼13.44
Total valid votes		6,193	100.00	
Total rejected ballots		203		
Unreturned ballots		0		
Turnout		6,396	71.50	▲0.05
Registered electors		8,946		
Majority		3,563	57.53	▲26.88
BN hold		Swing		

Selangor state election, 1978: Sungei Ayer Tawar
Party	Candidate	Votes	%	∆%
BN	Khalil Kasmijan	3,704	65.33	▲1.88
PAS	Taiban Hassan	1,966	34.67	▲34.67
Total valid votes		5,670	100.00	
Total rejected ballots		359		
Unreturned ballots		0		
Turnout		6,029	71.45	▼1.79
Registered electors		8,438		
Majority		1,738	30.65	▲3.77
BN hold		Swing		

Selangor state election, 1974: Sungei Ayer Tawar
Party	Candidate	Votes	%
BN	Jamaluddin Suhaimi	3,023	63.44
Independent	Shahrani Johari @ Ahmad Atan	3,023	63.44
Total valid votes		4,765	100.00
Total rejected ballots		452	
Unreturned ballots		0	
Turnout		5,217	73.24
Registered electors		7,123	
Majority		1,281	26.88
This was a new constituency created.
