= Railey Jeffrey =

Malaysian politician (1945–2020)

Yang Berbahagia Datuk Railey Jeffrey PGDK JMN

Deputy Minister of Works
- In office 8 May 1995 – 14 December 1999
- Monarch: Jaafar
- Prime Minister: Mahathir Mohamad
- Minister: Samy Vellu
- Preceded by: Kerk Choo Ting; Peter Tinggom Kamarau
- Succeeded by: Mohamed Khaled Nordin
- Constituency: Silam

Deputy Minister of Information
- In office 20 May 1987 – 3 May 1995
- Monarchs: Iskandar; Azlan Shah
- Prime Minister: Mahathir Mohamad
- Minister: Ahmad Rithauddeen Ismail; Mohamed Rahmat
- Preceded by: Rahmah Othman
- Succeeded by: Suleiman Mohamed
- Constituency: Silam

Member of the Malaysian Parliament for Silam
- In office 22 April 1986 – 21 March 2004
- Preceded by: Abdillah Abdul Hamid
- Succeeded by: Samsu Baharun Abdul Rahman

Personal details
- Born: 31 May 1945 North Borneo (now Sabah, Malaysia)
- Died: 26 December 2020 (aged 75) Petaling Jaya
- Resting place: Bukit Kiara Muslim Cemetery, Kuala Lumpur
- Citizenship: Malaysian
- Party: United Malays National Organisation (UMNO); United Sabah National Organisation (USNO)
- Other political affiliations: Barisan Nasional (BN)
- Spouse: Sheril Aida Alyahya (div.)
- Children: 4

Railey Jeffrey (31 May 1945 – 26 December 2020) was a Malaysian politician who served as the Deputy Minister of Information from May 1987 to May 1995, Deputy Minister of Works from May 1995 to December 1999 and Member of Parliament (MP) for Silam from April 1986 to March 2004. He was a member of the United Sabah National Organisation (USNO) and United Malays National Organisation (UMNO) party, a component party of the ruling Barisan Nasional (BN) coalition.

== Election results ==
Parliament of Malaysia
Year	Constituency	Candidate	Votes	Pct	Opponent(s)	Votes	Pct	Ballots cast	Majority	Turnout
1986	P152 Silam	Railey Jeffrey (USNO)	4,299	45.74%	Mohd Yusof Yahya (IND)	1,796	19.11%	9,514	2,503	42.99%
1986	P152 Silam	Railey Jeffrey (USNO)	4,299	45.74%	Madris Lee Buati (IND)	1,271	13.52%	9,514	2,503	42.99%
1986	P152 Silam	Railey Jeffrey (USNO)	4,299	45.74%	Mohd Jhastu Batu Emas (IND)	1,054	0.91%	9,514	2,503	42.99%
1986	P152 Silam	Railey Jeffrey (USNO)	4,299	45.74%	Zamrin Ismail @ Jamut (IND)	979	10.42%	9,514	2,503	42.99%
1990	P152 Silam	Railey Jeffrey (USNO)	10,322	55.26%	Mohammadin Ketapi (IND)	8,269	44.27%	18,860	2,053	58.91%
1990	P152 Silam	Railey Jeffrey (USNO)	10,322	55.26%	Hassan Malempeng (IND)	89	0.48%	18,860	2,053	58.91%
1995	P163 Silam	Railey Jeffrey (UMNO)	15,815	70.13%	Abdullah Minun Sahirun (PBS)	6,737	29.87%	23,057	9,078	58.32%
1999	P163 Silam	Railey Jeffrey (UMNO)	14,629	64.33%	Badrulamin Bahron (KeADILan)	8,110	35.67%	23,144	6,519	54.66%

== Honours ==
- Malaysia
  - Companion of the Order of the Defender of the Realm (JMN) (1991)
- Sabah
  - Commander of the Order of Kinabalu (PGDK) – Datuk (1994)
