= Shuhaimi Shafiei =

Malaysian politician

Mat Shuhaimi Shafiei
- سحيمي شافعي

Member of the Selangor State Assembly for Sungai Kandis
- In office 9 May 2018 – 2 July 2018
- Preceded by: Xavier Jayakumar Arulanandam (PR–PKR) (formerly Seri Andalas)
- Succeeded by: Zawawi Mughni (PH–PKR)
- Majority: 12,480 (2018)

Member of the Selangor State Assembly for Sri Muda
- In office 8 March 2008 – 9 May 2018
- Preceded by: Amzah Umar (BN–UMNO)
- Succeeded by: Ganabatirau Veraman (PH–DAP) (renamed Kota Kemuning)
- Majority: 5,974 (2008), 12,510 (2013)

Personal details
- Born: Mat Shuhaimi bin Shafiei; 27 February 1968 Bagan Serai, Perak, Malaysia
- Died: 2 July 2018 (aged 50) Subang Jaya Medical Center, Subang Jaya, Selangor, Malaysia
- Resting place: Muslim Cemetery, Section 21, Petaling Jaya, Selangor, Malaysia
- Citizenship: Malaysian
- Party: People's Justice Party (PKR)
- Other political affiliations: Pakatan Harapan (PH); Pakatan Rakyat (PR)
- Children: 1 son
- Occupation: Politician

Mat Shuhaimi bin Shafiei (27 February 1968 – 2 July 2018) was a Malaysian politician. Shafiei was a member of the People's Justice Party (PKR), a component party in the Pakatan Harapan (PH) ruling coalition. Shuhaimi worked for former Menteri Besar of Selangor; Mohamed Azmin Ali as a secretary. Shafiei represented Sri Muda seat in the Selangor State Legislative Assembly for two terms (2008-2018), and won reelection for Sungai Kandis seat instead in 2018 general election. He defeated three other candidates, but was unable to attend the swearing in ceremony due to ill health condition.

== Death ==
Shafiei died of stage four lymphoma on 2 July 2018 at aged 50. His death caused the Sungai Kandis by-election held on 4 August 2018 which was retained by PKR. Charges of sedition against Shafiei were dropped shortly after his death.

== Election results ==
Selangor State Legislative Assembly
Year	Constituency	Candidate	Votes	Pct	Opponent(s)	Votes	Pct	Ballots cast	Majority	Turnout
2008	N50 Sri Muda	Mat Shuhaimi Shafiei (PKR)	15,962	61.51%	Amzah Umar (UMNO)	9,988	38.49%	26,297	5,974	79.56%
2013	N50 Sri Muda	Mat Shuhaimi Shafiei (PKR)	27,488	64.36%	Mohd Abdul Raof Mokhtar (UMNO)	14,978	35.07%	43,177	12,510	87.85%
2013	N50 Sri Muda	Mat Shuhaimi Shafiei (PKR)	27,488	64.36%	Ramaswree Duraisamy (IND)	242	0.57%	43,177	12,510	87.85%
2018	N49 Sungai Kandis	Mat Shuhaimi Shafiei (PKR)	23,998	55.60%	Kamaruzzaman Johari (UMNO)	11,518	26.68%	43,585	12,480	85.80%
2018	N49 Sungai Kandis	Mat Shuhaimi Shafiei (PKR)	23,998	55.60%	Mohd Yusof Abdullah (PAS)	7,573	17.54%	43,585	12,480	85.80%
2018	N49 Sungai Kandis	Mat Shuhaimi Shafiei (PKR)	23,998	55.60%	Hanafiah Husin (PRM)	76	0.18%	43,585	12,480	85.80%
