= Kota Raja (federal constituency) =

Federal constituency of Selangor, Malaysia

Kota Raja (P111)
Selangor constituency

Federal constituency
- Legislature: Dewan Rakyat
- MP: Mohamad Sabu; PH
- Constituency created: 2003
- First contested: 2004
- Last contested: 2022

Demographics
- Population (2020): 523,094
- Electors (2023): 250,821
- Area (km²): 141
- Pop. density (per km²): 3,709.9

Kota Raja is a federal constituency in Klang District and Petaling District, Selangor, Malaysia, that has been represented in the Dewan Rakyat since 2004.

The federal constituency was created in the 2003 redistribution and is mandated to return a single member to the Dewan Rakyat under the first past the post voting system.

== Demographics ==
Ethnic breakdown of Kota Raja's electorate as of 2023
1. Malay (40.0%)
2. Chinese (29.7%)
3. Indian (27.1%)
4. Other ethnicities (3.21%)

Age breakdown of Kota Raja's electorate as of 2023
1. 18-20 (9.09%)
2. 21-29 (25.9%)
3. 30-39 (21.2%)
4. 40-49 (17.9%)
5. 50-59 (13.8%)
6. 60-69 (8.29%)
7. 70-79 (3.07%)
8. 80-89 (0.66%)
9. above 90 (0.11%)
Gender breakdown of Kota Raja's electorate as of 2022
1. Male (49.4%)
2. Female (50.6%)

== History ==
=== Polling districts ===
According to the federal gazette issued on 18 July 2023, the Kota Raja constituency is divided into 46 polling districts.

State constituency	Polling Districts	Code	Location
Sentosa (N48）	Taman Klang Jaya 1	111/48/01	SMK Raja Mahadi Taman Klang Jaya
Sentosa (N48）	Sentosa Dato Yusof Shahbuddin	111/48/02	SMK Shah Bandaraya
Sentosa (N48）	Taman Desawan	111/48/03	SK Taman Klang Jaya
Sentosa (N48）	Sentosa Dato Abdul Hamid 1	111/48/04	SRA Taman Klang Jaya
Sentosa (N48）	Sentosa Dato Dagang	111/48/05	SJK (T) Taman Sentosa Klang
Sentosa (N48）	Taman Klang Jaya 2	111/48/06	SMK Raja Mahadi Taman Klang Jaya
Sentosa (N48）	Sentosa Dato Abdul Hamid 2	111/48/07	Taman Bimbingan Kanak-Kanak (KEMAS) Cawangan Taman Sentosa
Sentosa (N48）	Bandar Bukit Tinggi 1	111/48/08	SK Bukit Tinggi; SMK Batu Unjur
Sentosa (N48）	Taman Maznah	111/48/09	SMJK Chung Hwa Seksyen 36 Shah Alam
Sentosa (N48）	Batu 4 Jalan Kebun	111/48/10	SJK (T) Batu Ampat Jalan Kota Raja
Sentosa (N48）	Taman Menara Maju	111/48/11	SK Kampung Jawa (2)
Sentosa (N48）	Bandar Bukit Tinggi 2	111/48/12	SMK Bukit Tinggi Klang
Sentosa (N48）	Bandar Botanic	111/48/13	SJK (T) Ladang Highlands
Sungai Kandis (N49）	Seksyen 34 Shah Alam	111/49/01	Dewan Pusat Latihan Teknologi Tinggi (ADTEC) Seksyen 34 Shah Alam
Sungai Kandis (N49）	Sungai Kandis	111/49/02	SRA Sungai Kandis Klang
Sungai Kandis (N49）	Teluk Menegun	111/49/03	SK Telok Menegon Klang
Sungai Kandis (N49）	LLN Connught Bridge	111/49/04	SRA Hajah Fatimah Kampong Datok Dagang Kelang
Sungai Kandis (N49）	Kampung Pandan	111/49/05	SA Rakyat (KAFA Integrasi) Kampung Pandan
Sungai Kandis (N49）	Kampung Jawa	111/49/06	Kolej Islam Sultan Alam Shah Klang
Sungai Kandis (N49）	Kota Raja	111/49/07	SMA Tinggi Sultan Hishamuddin
Sungai Kandis (N49）	Taman Seri Andalas 1	111/49/08	SK Taman Sri Andalas Klang
Sungai Kandis (N49）	Taman Seri Andalas 2	111/49/09	SMK Seri Andalas Klang
Sungai Kandis (N49）	Bukit Jati	111/49/10	SRA Kampung Jawa
Sungai Kandis (N49）	Taman Seri Andalas 3	111/49/11	SJK (T) Simpang Lima
Sungai Kandis (N49）	Jalan Raya Timur	111/49/12	SM (Psdn) Chung Hua
Sungai Kandis (N49）	Bandar Puteri Klang	111/49/13	Dewan Serbaguna Klang Jaya
Sungai Kandis (N49）	Jalan Kebun	111/49/14	SK Jalan Kebun
Sungai Kandis (N49）	Johan Setia	111/49/15	SK Kampung Johan Setia Klang
Sungai Kandis (N49）	Seri Gambut	111/49/16	SRA Bukit Naga Batu 6 Klang
Sungai Kandis (N49）	Kampung Bukit Naga	111/49/17	SK Bukit Naga Batu 6
Sungai Kandis (N49）	Haji Husin Jalan Kebun	111/49/18	SRA Jalan Kebun
Sungai Kandis (N49）	Taman Berjaya	111/49/19	SMK Jalan Kebun
Kota Kemuning（N50）	Shah Alam S 27 A	111/50/01	SK Hicom Seksyen 27 Shah Alam
Kota Kemuning（N50）	Shah Alam S 28	111/50/02	SK Taman Alam Megah
Kota Kemuning（N50）	Sri Muda 1	111/50/03	SK Taman Sri Muda
Kota Kemuning（N50）	Sri Muda 2 Utara	111/50/04	SK Taman Sri Muda (2)
Kota Kemuning（N50）	Bukit Kemuning	111/50/05	SJK (C) Khe Beng Batu 8
Kota Kemuning（N50）	Kampung Baru Hicom	111/50/06	Dewan Blok A, Pangsapuri PPR Hicom
Kota Kemuning（N50）	Putra Heights	111/50/07	SK Alam Megah (3) Shah Alam; SK Putra Height 2; SJK (C) Tun Tan Siew Sin
Kota Kemuning（N50）	Sri Muda 2 Selatan	111/50/08	SMK Taman Sri Muda
Kota Kemuning（N50）	Kota Kemuning Jalan 31/1 - 31/80	111/50/09	SK Bukit Kemuning
Kota Kemuning（N50）	Bukit Rimau	111/50/10	SK Bukit Rimau
Kota Kemuning（N50）	Shah Alam S 27 B	111/50/11	SK Seksyen 27 (1) Shah Alam
Kota Kemuning（N50）	Apartment S 28	111/50/12	SMK Alam Megah 2
Kota Kemuning（N50）	Kota Kemuning Jalan 31/81 - 31/170	111/50/13	SK Bukit Kemuning 2
Kota Kemuning（N50）	Shah Alam S 26	111/50/14	SMA Al-Hikmah Shah Alam

=== Representation history ===
Members of Parliament for Kota Raja
Parliament	No	Years	Member	Party	Vote Share
Constituency created from Shah Alam
11th	P111	2004–2008	S. Vigneswaran M. Sanasee (ச. விக்னேஸ்வரன்)	BN (MIC)	24,376; 55.25%
12th	P111	2008–2013	Siti Mariah Mahmud (سيتي مارية محمود)	PR (PAS)	38,630; 68.36%
13th	P111	2013–2015	Siti Mariah Mahmud (سيتي مارية محمود)	PR (PAS)	59,106; 64.62%
13th	P111	2015–2018	Siti Mariah Mahmud (سيتي مارية محمود)	AMANAH	59,106; 64.62%
14th	P111	2018–2022	Mohamad Sabu (محمد سابو)	PH (AMANAH)	90,697; 70.79%
15th	P111	2022–present	Mohamad Sabu (محمد سابو)	PH (AMANAH)	123,306; 62.36%

=== State constituency ===
Parliamentary constituency	State constituency						
Parliamentary constituency	1955–59*	1959–1974	1974–1986	1986–1995	1995–2004	2004–2018	2018–present
Kota Raja							Kota Kemuning
Kota Raja							Sentosa
Kota Raja						Seri Andalas	
Kota Raja						Sri Muda	
Kota Raja							Sungai Kandis

=== Historical boundaries ===
State Constituency	Area	
State Constituency	2003	2018
Kota Kemuning		Bukit Lanchong; Kota Kemuning; Putra Heights; Seksyen 25 - 28, 31, 33 Shah Alam; Sri Muda
Sentosa		Bandar Botanic; Bukit Tinggi; Sentosa; Taman Sejati; Taman Sri Wangi
Seri Andalas	Klang Jaya; Seksyen 34 - 36 Shah Alam; Sentosa; Seri Andalas; Taman Sri Wangi	
Sri Muda	Ambang Botanic; Bukit Lanchong; Kota Kemuning; Putra Heights; Seksyen 25 - 33 Shah Alam	
Sungai Kandis		Ambang Botanic; Johan Setia; Seksyen 29 - 30, 32, 34 - 36 Shah Alam; Taman Sri Andalas; Teluk Menegun

=== Current state assembly members ===
No.	State Constituency	Member	Coalition (Party)
N48	Sentosa	Gunarajah George	PH (PKR)
N49	Sungai Kandis	Wan Dzahanurin Ahmad	PN (BERSATU)
N50	Kota Kemuning	Preakas Sampunathan	PH (DAP)

=== Local governments & postcodes ===
No.	State Constituency	Local Government	Postcode
N48	Sentosa	Shah Alam City Council (Taman Maznah area); Klang City Council	40400, 40460, 40470 Shah Alam; 41000, 41200, Klang; 47650 Putra Heights
N49	Sungai Kandis	Shah Alam City Council (Sungai Kandis and Seksyen 34 areas); Klang City Council	40400, 40460, 40470 Shah Alam; 41000, 41200, Klang; 47650 Putra Heights
N50	Kota Kemuning	Shah Alam City Council (Kota Kemuning, Bukit Kemuning and Bukit Rimau); Subang Jaya City Council (Putra Heights area)	40400, 40460, 40470 Shah Alam; 41000, 41200, Klang; 47650 Putra Heights

== Election results ==
Malaysian general election, 2022
Party	Candidate	Votes	%	∆%
PH	Mohamad Sabu	123,306	62.36	▼8.46
PN	Mohamed Diah Baharun	49,308	24.94	▲24.94
BN	Kajendran Doraisamy	22,225	11.24	▼2.71
PEJUANG	Fahmi Bazlan Muda	2,063	1.04	▲1.04
Parti Rakyat Malaysia	Che Sara Afiqah Zainul Arif	360	0.18	▲0.18
Independent	P Raveentharan Periasamy	209	0.11	▲0.11
Independent	Kumar Karananedi	163	0.08	▲0.08
Independent	Surendhar Selvaraju	106	0.05	▲0.05
Total valid votes		197,740	100.00	
Total rejected ballots		1,586		
Unreturned ballots		552		
Turnout		199,878	80.81	▼6.03
Registered electors		244,712		
Majority		73,998	37.42	▼18.11
PH hold		Swing		
Source(s) https://lom.agc.gov.my/ilims/upload/portal/akta/outputp/1753283/PUB612.pdf

Malaysian general election, 2018
Party	Candidate	Votes	%	∆%
PH	Mohamad Sabu	90,697	70.79	▲70.79
PAS	Mohamed Diah Baharun	19,555	15.26	▼49.36
BN	V. Gunalan	17,874	13.95	▼18.53
Total valid votes		128,126	100.00	
Total rejected ballots		966		
Unreturned ballots		320		
Turnout		129,412	86.84	▼0.72
Registered electors		149,021		
Majority		71,142	55.53	▲23.39
PH gain from PAS		Swing		?
Source(s) "His Majesty's Government Gazette - Notice of Contested Election, Parliament for the State of Selangor [P.U. (B) 239/2018]" (PDF). Attorney General's Chambers of Malaysia. 3 May 2018. Archived from the original (PDF) on 2019-07-19. "Federal Government Gazette - Results of Contested Election and Statements of the Poll after the Official Addition of Votes, Parliamentary Constituencies for the State of Selangor [P.U. (B) 313/2018]" (PDF). Attorney General's Chambers of Malaysia. 28 May 2018. Archived from the original (PDF) on 2019-07-19.

Malaysian general election, 2013
Party	Candidate	Votes	%	∆%
PAS	Siti Mariah Mahmud	59,106	64.62	▼3.71
BN	Murugesan Sinnandavar	29,711	32.48	▲0.84
Independent	Uthayakumar Ponnusamy	2,364	2.58	▲2.58
Independent	Azman Idrus	280	0.31	▲0.31
Total valid votes		91,461	100.00	
Total rejected ballots		1,102		
Unreturned ballots		116		
Turnout		92,729	87.56	▲7.81
Registered electors		105,909		
Majority		29,395	32.14	▼4.58
PAS hold		Swing		
Source(s) "Federal Government Gazette - Notice of Contested Election, Parliament for the State of Selangor [P.U. (B) 176/2013]" (PDF). Attorney General's Chambers of Malaysia. 26 April 2013. Archived from the original (PDF) on 2018-09-30. "Federal Government Gazette - Results of Contested Election and Statements of the Poll after the Official Addition of Votes, Parliamentary Constituencies for the State of Selangor [P.U. (B) 217/2013]" (PDF). Attorney General's Chambers of Malaysia. 22 May 2013. Archived from the original (PDF) on 2018-09-30.

Malaysian general election, 2008
Party	Candidate	Votes	%	∆%
PAS	Siti Mariah Mahmud	38,630	68.36	▲31.79
BN	S. Vigneswaran M. Sanasee	17,879	31.64	▼23.61
Total valid votes		56,509	100.00	
Total rejected ballots		814		
Unreturned ballots		0		
Turnout		57,323	79.75	▲3.08
Registered electors		71,887		
Majority		20,751	36.72	▲18.04
PAS gain from BN		Swing		?

Malaysian general election, 2004
Party	Candidate	Votes	%
BN	S. Vigneswaran M. Sanasee	24,376	55.25
PAS	Siti Mariah Mahmud	16,137	36.57
Independent	Krisnasamy Thevarayan	3,608	8.18
Total valid votes		44,121	100.00
Total rejected ballots		627	
Unreturned ballots		10	
Turnout		44,758	76.67
Registered electors		58,374	
Majority		8,239	18.68
This was a new constituency created.
