= Sentosa (state constituency) =

State constituency in Selangor, Malaysia

Sentosa (N48)
Selangor constituency

State constituency
- Legislature: Selangor State Legislative Assembly
MLA
Gunarajah George
PH
- Constituency created: 2018
- First contested: 2018
- Last contested: 2023

Demographics
- Electors (2023): 90,270

Sentosa is a state constituency in Selangor, Malaysia.

Sentosa was created in the 2016 redistribution and was first represented in the Selangor State Legislative Assembly in 2018. The seat was called Kota Alam Shah prior to the 2018 redelineation. Sentosa is represented under the Kota Raja parliamentary constituency. It has been represented by Gunarajah George of Pakatan Harapan (PH) since May 2018.

Sentosa is the first and only Indian plurality state constituency in the state of Selangor. It consists of 44% Indian, 35% Chinese, 19% Malay and 2% other voters.

== Demographics ==
Ethnic breakdown of Sentosa's electorate as of 2023
1. Indian (44.0%)
2. Chinese (35.0%)
3. Malay (19.0%)
4. Other ethnicities (2.00%)

== History ==
=== Polling districts ===
According to the federal gazette issued on 30 March 2018, the Sentosa constituency is divided into 13 polling districts.

State constituency	Polling Districts	Code	Location
Sentosa (N48）	Taman Klang Jaya 1	111/48/01	SMK Raja Mahadi Taman Klang Jaya
Sentosa (N48）	Sentosa Dato Yusof Shahbuddin	111/48/02	Dewan Sentosa Majlis Perbandaran Klang Jalan Sungai Jati
Sentosa (N48）	Taman Desawan	111/48/03	SK Taman Klang Jaya
Sentosa (N48）	Sentosa Dato Abdul Hamid 1	111/48/04	SRA Taman Klang Jaya
Sentosa (N48）	Sentosa Dato Dagang	111/48/05	Dewan Orang Ramai Apartment Impian Sentosa
Sentosa (N48）	Taman Klang Jaya 2	111/48/06	SMK Raja Mahadi Taman Klang Jaya
Sentosa (N48）	Sentosa Dato Abdul Hamid 2	111/48/07	Taman Bimbingan Kanak-Kanak (KEMAS) Cawangan Taman Sentosa
Sentosa (N48）	Bandar Bukit Tinggi 1	111/48/08	SK Bukit Tinggi
Sentosa (N48）	Taman Maznah	111/48/09	SMJK Chung Hwa Seksyen 36 Shah Alam
Sentosa (N48）	Batu 4 Jalan Kebun	111/48/10	SJK (T) Batu Ampat Jalan Kota Raja
Sentosa (N48）	Taman Menara Maju	111/48/11	SK Kampung Jawa (2)
Sentosa (N48）	Bandar Bukit Tinggi 2	111/48/12	SMK Bukit Tinggi Klang
Sentosa (N48）	Bandar Botanic	111/48/13	SJK (T) Ladang Highlands

=== Representation history ===
Members of the Legislative Assembly for Sentosa
Assembly	No	Years	Member	Party
Constituency renamed from Pelabuhan Klang, Seri Andalas, Sri Muda and Kota Alam Shah
14th	N48	2018–2023	Gunarajah George	PH (PKR)
15th	N48	2023–present	Gunarajah George	PH (PKR)

== Election results ==
Selangor state election, 2023
Party	Candidate	Votes	%	∆%
PH	Gunarajah George	54,601	83.53	▼2.09
PN	Parameswaran Ganason	8,252	12.62	▲12.62
MUDA	Thanusha Ramanieswaran	2,357	3.61	▲3.61
Parti Rakyat Malaysia	Jeichandran Wadivelu	156	0.24	▲0.24
Total valid votes		65,366	100.00	
Total rejected ballots		423		
Unreturned ballots		84		
Turnout		65,873	72.97	▼14.39
Registered electors		90,270		
Majority		46,349	70.91	▼4.58
PH hold		Swing		

Selangor state election, 2018
Party	Candidate	Votes	%
PKR	Gunarajah George	38,106	85.62
BN	Subramaniam Retam	4,506	10.12
PAS	Rajan Manikesavan	1,722	3.87
Independent	Sundarajoo Periasamy	95	0.21
Parti Rakyat Malaysia	Telaiamblam Mariappan	79	0.18
Total valid votes		44,508	100.00
Total rejected ballots		344	
Unreturned ballots		92	
Turnout		44,944	87.36
Registered electors		51,444	
Majority		33,600	75.49
This was a new constituency created.
