= Lokman Noor Adam =

Malaysian politician

Yang Berbahagia Dato' Lokman Noor Adam DIMP
- لقمان نور ﺍدم
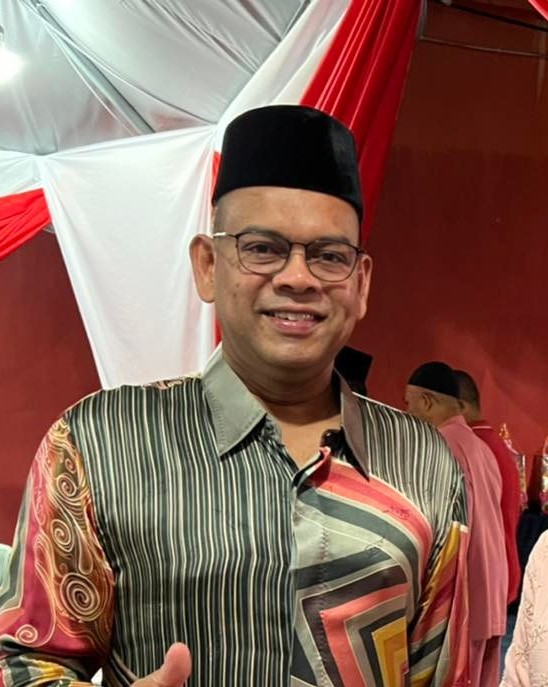
- Lokman Noor in 2022

Chairman of the Board of Directors of the Permodalan RISDA Berhad
- Incumbent
- Assumed office 11 December 2023
- Minister: Ahmad Zahid Hamidi
- RISDA Chairman: Manndzri Nasib

Head of the Media Secretariat of the Unity Government
- Incumbent
- Assumed office 31 May 2023
- Prime Minister: Anwar Ibrahim
- Minister: Ahmad Fahmi Mohamed Fadzil
- Preceded by: Position created

Director of UMNO Communications
- Incumbent
- Assumed office 29 March 2023
- Information Chief: Azalina Othman Said

Member of the UMNO Supreme Council
- Incumbent
- Assumed office 17 February 2023
- President: Ahmad Zahid Hamidi
- In office 1 July 2018 – 7 February 2020
- President: Ahmad Zahid Hamidi

Member of the UMNO Youth EXCO
- In office 2008–2013
- Youth Chief: Hishammuddin Hussein (2008–2009); Khairy Jamaluddin (2009–2013)

Secretary of PKR Youth EXCO (Note: National KeADILan Youth from 1999 until 2003 and PKR Youth from 2003 until 2004.)
- In office 4 April 1999 – February 2004
- Youth Chief: Mohamad Ezam Mohd Nor
- Preceded by: Position created

Personal details
- Born: Lokman Noor bin Adam; 1 January 1973 (age 53) Batu Pahat, Johor, Malaysia
- Party: United Malay National Organization (UMNO) (1991–1998, 2006–2020, 2021–present); People's Justice Party (PKR) (2003–2004); National Justice Party (KeADILan) (1999–2003)
- Other political affiliations: Barisan Nasional (BN) (1991–1998, 2006–2020, 2021–present); Barisan Alternatif (BA) (1999–2004)
- Spouse: Nur Fazilah Ahmad Muhyidin
- Children: 11 (including 3 adopted children)
- Education: MARA Institute of Technology (Dip); Islamic College of Science & Technology Malaysia (Dip); Universiti Tun Abdul Razak (MIM)
- Occupation: Politician
- Nickname: Lobakman (Note: The nickname given by the UMNO presidential candidate who lost in the 2018 UMNO election, Khairy Jamaluddin following a fight that broke out between the two because Lokman Noor defended Najib Razak.)

Lokman Noor bin Adam (Jawi: لقمان نور بن ﺍدم; born 1 January 1973) is a Malaysian politician who serves as the head of the Media Secretariat of the Unity Government since May 2023 and the chairman of the Board of Directors of the Permodalan RISDA Berhad since December 2023. He also serves as the director of UMNO Communications since March 2023. He is a member of the United Malays National Organisation (UMNO), a component party of the BN coalition. He is currently a member of the UMNO Supreme Council since February 2023 as well as in July 2018 to February 2020, following his dismissal. Lokman Noor is an important figure for Reformasi in defending human rights and the freedom of Anwar Ibrahim. He has been detained under the ISA twice. On 15 July 2021, he was sentenced to one month in prison by the Kuala Lumpur High Court, after being found guilty of contempt of court for threatening the main witness Amhari Efendi in the 1Malaysia Development Berhad scandal case involving former prime minister Najib Razak.

== Early life and education ==
Lokman Noor bin Adam was born on 1 January 1973 in Batu Pahat, Johor, Malaysia. He is the eldest of seven siblings. His father, Adam Ali who served as the former Head of Information for UMNO Kluang Division during Lokman Noor's childhood. He went to Batu Pahat High School and Kluang High School, Johor to completed his secondary education in 1990. Later, he continued his higher education at the MARA Institute of Technology (ITM), Perak (now known as the MARA Technological University (UiTM)) for the Diploma of Secretarial Science, where he graduated in 1994. He also received his Diploma in Siyassah Syarriah and Islamic leadership from the Institut Pengajian Ilmu-ilmu Islam (now known as the Islamic College of Science & Technology) in 2003 and master's degree in Management (MIM) from the Graduate School of Business (GSB), Universiti Tun Abdul Razak (UNIRAZAK).

== Early political career (1991–2004) ==
=== Early career in UMNO ===
Lokman Noor started getting involved in the political arena as early as the age of 15. He holds the record as the youngest Branch UMNO Youth Leader since he was 18 years old in 1991, being the Head of Umno Youth Branch Taman Kluang, Johor. He was appointed as the Secretary of the Culture and Arts Council of the Malaysian UMNO Youth Movement, the Rural Development Council Committee and the Malaysian UMNO Youth Science and Technology Council Committee (1996–1998).

At the beginning of his political career, he became Exco Youth of UMNO Malaysia, Chairman of the BN and UMNO Youth Speech Unit, BTN Rebranding Think Tank and Member of the UMNO Information Think Tank. However, he was fired from UMNO in 1998 for reprimanding Mahathir Mohamad, prime minister and UMNO president at the time about the Anwar Ibrahim sodomy case.

=== Reformasi fighter and 1999 general election ===
After his dismissal, Lokman Noor became a fighter for the KeADILan and Reformasi wave from that moment on who was locked up eight times for leading a series of demonstrations defending the right to speak and assemble and fight for liberation of former deputy prime minister Anwar Ibrahim.

He was appointed as the first Johor KeADILan Youth Leader in 1999 and was elected as a member of the KeADILan Supreme Leadership Council in the party's first election. In the 1999 general election, Lokman Noor was elected by KeADILan for the Tenggara parliamentary constituency against the acting UMNO Youth Leader, Hishammuddin Hussein. He became the youngest candidate to contest this general election in Johor. Lokman Noor only managed to get 7,559 votes, losing with a majority of 20,817 votes to Hishammuddin Hussein.

In 2004, he was fired from KeADILan for reprimanding the then KeADILan Youth Leader, Mohamad Ezam Mohd Nor.

== Political career (2006–present) ==
=== Strengthening his position in UMNO ===
He rejoined UMNO in 2006 in UMNO Shah Alam Division and served as Shah Alam UMNO Youth Exco and Malaysian UMNO Youth Exco (2008–2013). He was also appointed as Chairman of the BN and UMNO Youth Speech Unit (2009–2013) BTN Rebranding Think Tank (2016), Member of Malaysia UMNO Information Think Tank (2016–2018), Special Affairs Department Think Tank (2010–2016), Director Communications, Ministry of Finance Malaysia (2016–2018) and President of New Malaysia Monitor (2018).

He has also held the position of Director of Viral Command Center JASA and KKMM. While being a JASA Thinker Panel for almost seven years, he performed the task of responding to current issues on behalf of the government through writing, producing infographics, videos, publishing neural stimulation materials in addition to delivering lectures on current issues, presenting working papers, being a forum panel and debate representing government to civil servants, political party machinery, NGOs, domestic and foreign students.

=== 2018 Sungai Kandis by-election ===
Lokman Noor was selected by the component parties Barisan Nasional (BN) and the UMNO party as a candidate for the 2018 Sungai Kandis by-election. This election saw a three-cornered clash between the Pakatan Harapan (PH)–People's Justice Party (PKR), BN–UMNO and Independent candidates. PKR nominated Mohd Zawawi Ahmad Mughni while BN–UMNO has placed Lokman Noor. An independent candidate Murti Krishnasamy also nominated himself on the nomination day. Mohd Zawawi Ahmad Mughni defeated Lokman Noor with a majority of 5,842 votes.

=== Malaysia Unity Government phase ===
He was reappointed as a Member of the UMNO Supreme Council on 17 February 2023. This statement was informed by the Deputy President of UMNO, Mohamad Hasan via phone call.

On late May 2023, he was appointed as the Head of the Media Secretariat of the Unity Government by the Secretariat of the Unity Government of Malaysia led by Anwar Ibrahim. He also holds the position of UMNO Communications Director since March 2023. He was appointed as the chairman of the Board of Directors of the Permodalan RISDA Berhad since December 2023 by Ahmad Zahid Hamidi, Deputy Prime Minister and Minister of Rural and Regional Development.

== Controversies and issues ==
=== ISA detention twice ===
In 1998, Lokman Noor was detained under the Internal Security Act (ISA) for 2 months, while in 2001 to 2003, he was detained under the Internal Security Act (ISA) for two years and two months. He was also arrested eight times and detained under the ISA in 1998 for leading a demonstration to defend the right to speak and assemble to fight for Anwar Ibrahim who was sacked as deputy prime minister on allegations of corruption and sodomy. Whereas, in 2001, he was again arrested under the ISA and released in 2003.

=== Adviser to Sultan of Sulu ===
Lokman Noor said that he had indeed been an advisor to the Sultan of Sulu who was "recognized" by the Malaysian government, Sultan Roodinood Julaspi Kiram in 2005 to 2006. His appointment as an adviser to the son of Sultan Julaspi Kiram was aimed at assisting with dealings with the Malaysian government regarding their welfare. He also added that "I admit, I was once appointed by the real Sultan of Sulu, Sultan Roodinood, son of Sultan Julaspi Kiram as his advisor around 2005 to deal with the Malaysian government regarding their welfare. "I also admit that I have printed the name card for the position for official business with the Malaysian government. To confirm this matter, you can refer to the foreign minister at the time, Syed Hamid Albar," he said in a media statement today.

=== Conflict with Khairy Jamaluddin ===
Lokman Noor and Khairy Jamaluddin clashed around 2018 because Lokman Noor defended former prime minister Najib Razak. This dispute caused Khairy to nickname Lokman Noor as "Lobakman". The name of this title comes from Khairy's Twitter account tweet against him in 2018 which called him having a low IQ like carrot. The post reads: “You better pray I dont become president of UMNO. First thing I'll do is sack you for having the IQ of a carrot." However, in the UMNO 2018 election, Khairy lost to Ahmad Zahid Hamidi for the position of UMNO President while Lokman Noor won the position of Member of the UMNO Malaysia Supreme Council.

=== Stripping of UMNO membership in 2020 ===
On 2 January 2020, 7 UMNO Youth leaders filed a complaint and report to the UMNO Disciplinary Board and urged the party's Supreme Council to investigate Lokman Noor for violating party discipline.

They claimed that Lokman Noor at that time as a member had violated party discipline for disputing the decision made by the leadership regarding the investigation of the disciplinary board against the former Vice President Hishammuddin Hussein. In addition to the case related to Hishammuddin and criticism of Zahid, Lokman Noor has also publicly criticized the deputy president Mohamad Hasan and Umno Youth Chief Asyraf Wajdi Dusuki.

The seven UMNO Youth leaders who filed a complaint are Shah Zanuriman Bin Nuar Paras Khan (Selayang UMNO Youth Leader), Mohd Alfie Zainal Abidin (Subang UMNO Youth Leader), Zulkifli Rajalie (Ampang UMNO Youth Leader), Ahmad Feardaus Daud (Gombak UMNO Youth Leader), Mohamad Syahir Mohd Yusof (Hulu Langat UMNO Youth Leader), Ashrul Ashryzad Mohd Nashri (Bandar Tun Razak UMNO Youth Leader) and Mohd Khairul Nizam Mohd Isa (Bukit Bintang UMNO Youth Leader). In addition to these seven youth leaders, a member of the Subang UMNO Youth committee, Izzat Zabir Sarif also made the same complaint.

On 7 February 2020, the UMNO Supreme Council issued a statement regarding the dismissal from the UMNO Supreme Council and dropping its membership. On 30 September 2021, Lokman Noor's application to rejoin UMNO was accepted by the party.

=== 1MDB scandal ===
On 15 July 2021, Lokman Noor was sentenced to one month in prison by the High Court after being found guilty of contempt of court for threatening witnesses in the 1Malaysia Development Berhad case (1MDB) trial involving former prime minister Najib Razak.

On 29 September 2022, the prosecution asked the Court of Appeal to impose a heavier sentence on Lokman Noor.

== Personal life ==
Lokman Noor married Nur Fazilah Ahmad Muhyidin and was blessed with 11 children (including three adopted children). Two of his adopted children are from Indonesia, while one is Rohingya.

== Election results ==
Parliament of Malaysia
Year	Constituency	Candidate	Votes	Pct	Opponent(s)	Votes	Pct	Ballots cast	Majority	Turnout
1999	P136 Tenggara	Lokman Noor Adam (KeADILan)	7,559	21.04%	Hishammuddin Hussein (UMNO)	28,376	78.96%	37,829	20,817	78.06%

Selangor State Legislative Assembly
Year	Constituency	Candidate	Votes	Pct	Opponent(s)	Votes	Pct	Ballots cast	Majority	Turnout
2018	N49 Sungai Kandis	Lokman Noor Adam (UMNO)	9,585	38.17%	Mohd Zawawi Ahmad Mughni (PKR)	15,427	61.44%	25,303	5,842	49.39%
2018	N49 Sungai Kandis	Lokman Noor Adam (UMNO)	9,585	38.17%	Murti Krishnasamy (IND)	97	0.39%	25,303	5,842	49.39%

== Honour ==
=== Honour of Malaysia ===
- Pahang
  - Knight Companion of the Order of the Crown of Pahang (DIMP) – Dato' (2015)

== See also ==
- 1Malaysia Development Berhad scandal
- Najib Razak controversies
