= Zawawi Mughni =

Malaysian politician

Mohd Zawawi Ahmad Mughni PPT
- محمد زاواوي بن احمد مغني

Member of the Selangor State Executive Council
- In office 17 September 2020 – 21 August 2023
- Monarch: Sharafuddin
- Menteri Besar: Amirudin Shari
- Portfolio: Islamic Affairs, Consumer Affairs and Halal Industry
- Preceded by: Amirudin Shari (Islamic Affairs); Hee Loy Sian (Consumer Affairs)
- Succeeded by: Mohammad Fahmi Ngah (Islamic Affairs & Halal Industry)
- Constituency: Sungai Kandis

Member of the Selangor State Legislative Assembly for Sungai Kandis
- In office 4 August 2018 – 12 August 2023
- Preceded by: Shuhaimi Shafiei (PH–PKR)
- Succeeded by: Wan Dzahanurin Ahmad (PN–BERSATU)
- Majority: 5,842 (2018)

Personal details
- Born: Mohd Zawawi bin Ahmad Mughni; 20 September 1970 (age 56) Jalan Kebun, Shah Alam, Selangor, Malaysia
- Party: People's Justice Party (PKR)
- Other political affiliations: Pakatan Harapan (PH)
- Spouse: Hazlina Abdul Razak
- Children: 5
- Education: University of Malaya; Al-Azhar University
- Occupation: Politician

Mohd Zawawi bin Ahmad Mughni (born 20 September 1970) is a Malaysian politician who served as Member of the Selangor State Executive Council (EXCO) in the Pakatan Harapan (PH) state administration under Menteri Besar Amirudin Shari from September 2020 and Member of the Selangor State Legislative Assembly (MLA) for Sungai Kandis from August 2018 to August 2023. He is a member of the People's Justice Party (PKR), a component party of the PH coalition.

== Election results ==
Selangor State Legislative Assembly
Year	Constituency	Candidate	Votes	Pct	Opponent(s)	Votes	Pct	Ballots cast	Majority	Turnout
2018	N49 Sungai Kandis	Mohd Zawawi Ahmad Mughni (PKR)	15,427	61.44%	Lokman Noor Adam (UMNO)	9,585	38.17%	25,303	5,842	49.39%
2018	N49 Sungai Kandis	Mohd Zawawi Ahmad Mughni (PKR)	15,427	61.44%	Murti Krishnazamy (IND)	97	0.39%	25,303	5,842	49.39%
2023	N49 Sungai Kandis	Mohd Zawawi Ahmad Mughni (PKR)	28,759	48.72%	Wan Dzahanurin Ahmad (BERSATU)	28,926	49.01%	59,330	167	75.48%
2023	N49 Sungai Kandis	Mohd Zawawi Ahmad Mughni (PKR)	28,759	48.72%	Arfiena Shaqira Sariff (MUDA)	1,341	2.27%	59,330	167	75.48%

== Honours ==
- Selangor
  - Recipient of the Distinguished Conduct Medal (PPT) (2011)
