= Kota Alam Shah (state constituency) =

Selangor constituency

Defunct state constituency
- Legislature: Selangor State Legislative Assembly
- Constituency created: 2003
- Constituency abolished: 2018
- First contested: 2004
- Last contested: 2013

Kota Alam Shah was a state constituency in Selangor, Malaysia and was first represented in the Selangor State Legislative Assembly in 2004.

== History ==
It was abolished in 2018 when it was redistributed.

=== Representation history ===
Members of the Legislative Assembly for Kota Alam Shah
Assembly	No	Years	Member	Party
Constituency created from Kota Raja
11th	N48	2004–2008	Ching Su Chen (莊秀春)	BN (Gerakan)
12th	N48	2008–2013	Manoharan Malayalam	PR (DAP)
13th	N48	2013–2015	Ganabatirau Veraman	PR (DAP)
13th	N48	2015–2018	Ganabatirau Veraman	PH (DAP)
Constituency renamed to Sentosa

== Results ==
Selangor state election, 2013
Party	Candidate	Votes	%	∆%
DAP	Ganabatirau Veraman	18,971	76.37	▲6.65
BN	Maglin Dennis D'Cruz	5,602	22.55	▼7.73
Independent	Loo Hok Chai	186	0.75	▲0.75
Independent	Pannerselvam G. Letchumanan	82	0.33	▲0.33
Total valid votes		24,841	100.00	
Total rejected ballots		386		
Unreturned ballots		39		
Turnout		25,266	85.63	▲9.20
Registered electors		29,507		
Majority		13,369	53.82	▲14.38
DAP hold		Swing		
Source(s) "Federal Government Gazette - Notice of Contested Election, State Legislative Assembly for the State of Selangor [P.U. (B) 192/2013]" (PDF). Attorney General's Chambers of Malaysia. 26 April 2013. Archived from the original (PDF) on 2019-12-29. "Federal Government Gazette - Results of Contested Election and Statements of the Poll after the Official Addition of Votes, State Constituencies for the State of Selangor [P.U. (B) 233/2013]" (PDF). Attorney General's Chambers of Malaysia. 22 May 2013. Archived from the original (PDF) on 2018-10-02.

Selangor state election, 2008
Party	Candidate	Votes	%	∆%
DAP	Manoharan Malayalam	12,699	69.72	▲28.36
BN	Ching Su Chen	5,515	30.28	▼28.36
Total valid votes		18,214	100.00	
Total rejected ballots		211		
Unreturned ballots		46		
Turnout		18,471	76.43	▲6.32
Registered electors		24,168		
Majority		7,184	39.44	▲22.16
DAP gain from BN		Swing		?

Selangor state election, 2004
Party	Candidate	Votes	%
BN	Ching Su Chen	9,309	58.64
DAP	Thye Kim Kiong	6,566	41.36
Total valid votes		15,875	100.00
Total rejected ballots		248	
Unreturned ballots		50	
Turnout		16,173	70.11
Registered electors		23,068	
Majority		2,743	17.28
This was a new constituency created.
