= Manoharan Malayalam =

Malaysian politician

- എം. മനോഹരൻ

Member of the Selangor State Assembly for Kota Alam Shah
- In office 8 March 2008 – 5 May 2013
- Preceded by: Ching Su Chen (BN–Gerakan)
- Succeeded by: Ganabatirau Veraman (PR–DAP)
- Majority: 7,184 (2008)

Personal details
- Born: 13 September 1961 (age 65) Selangor, Federation of Malaya (now Malaysia)
- Party: Democratic Action Party (DAP)
- Other political affiliations: Pakatan Harapan (PH) (2015–present); Pakatan Rakyat (PR) (2008–2015); Barisan Alternatif (BA) (1999–2004)
- Spouse: S. Pushpaneela
- Children: Hariharan, Shivaranjini, Ganendra
- Education: University of Sheffield, University of Malaya
- Occupation: Politician, lawyer

Manoharan s/o Malayalam (Malayalam: എം. മനോഹരൻ; born 13 September 1961) also known as M. Manoharan is a Malaysian lawyer and was the State Assemblyman for Kota Alam Shah in the Selangor State Assembly. He is a member of the Democratic Action Party (DAP).

Manoharan was actively involved in the HINDRAF movement. He represented M. Moorthy's widow, Kaliammal Sinnasamy in a legal tussle over the late Everest conqueror's body.

== Political career ==
Manoharan is a member of the Democratic Action Party (DAP). In the 1999 general elections, Manoharan was the DAP candidate for the Segambut parliamentary constituency. Manoharan lost to the Barisan Nasional (BN) candidate Tan Kee Kwong with 16,340 votes opposed to Tan's 24,926 votes.

In the 2008 general elections, Manoharan, represented the DAP and won the Selangor State Legislative Assembly seat for Kota Alam Shah getting twice as many votes as the ethnic Chinese candidate, in a seat dominated by ethnic Chinese voters. M Manoharan obtained 12,699 votes to win with a 7,184-vote majority the Kota Alam Shah state seat.

The news of his victory was one of the surprising ones in the 2008 elections as he is being detained under the Internal Security Act without trial after organising anti-discrimination protests. Manoharan is only the third person to have won an election while under ISA detention.

On 9 May 2009, Manoharan, along with P. Uthayakumar and K. Vasantha Kumar were released from ISA detention at about 2.30.

== HINDRAF ==
HINDRAF or Hindu Rights Action Force is a coalition of 30 Hindu NGOs. Manoharan along with four other lawyers, P. Uthayakumar, P. Waytha Moorthy, K. Ganghadaran and V. Ganabatirau are seeking justice for the Hindu and Indian Malaysian community.

On 30 October 2007, Manoharan, P. Uthayakumar, P. Waytha Moorthy and S. V. Ganapathi Rao were arrested for taking part in the 2007 HINDRAF demonstration against the demolishment of a Hindu Shrine in Kuala Lumpur. Because of this "unlawful arrest", the lawyers are seeking 85 million Malaysian Ringgits in compensation, with Manoharan, Uthayakumar and Ganapathi Rao seeking 20 million while Waytha Moorthy is seeking 25 million.

Manoharan was also part of a team of lawyers representing P. Uthayakumar, P. Waytha Moorthy and S. V. Ganapathi Rao after they were arrested again for sedition.

== Arrest under Internal Security Act (ISA) ==
Manoharan was arrested under the Internal Security Act on 13 December 2007. Karpal Singh and M. Kulasegaran, two Democratic Action Party (DAP) Members of Parliaments filed an application to free Manoharan, but it was struck out by the presiding judge because the photocopy of the detention order served to Manoharan was not certified.

== Election results ==
Parliament of Malaysia
Year	Constituency	Candidate	Votes	Pct	Opponent(s)	Votes	Pct	Ballots cast	Majority	Turnout
1999	P106 Segambut	Manoharan Malayalam (DAP)	16,338	39.59%	Tan Kee Kwong (Gerakan)	24,926	60.41%	42,175	8,588	70.16%

Selangor State Legislative Assembly
Year	Constituency	Candidate	Votes	Pct	Opponent(s)	Votes	Pct	Ballots cast	Majority	Turnout
2008	N48 Kota Alam Shah	Manoharan Malayalam (DAP)	12,699	69.72%	Ching Su Chen (Gerakan)	5,515	30.28%	18,471	7,184	76.43%
