= Xavier Jayakumar =

Malaysian politician

Yang Berbahagia Dato' Dr. Xavier Jayakumar DJMK
- சேவியர் ஜெயக்குமார்
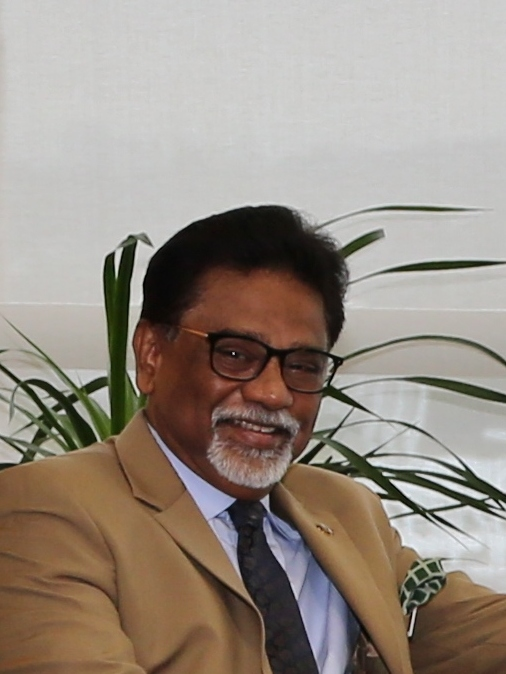

Minister of Water, Land and Natural Resources
- In office 2 July 2018 – 24 February 2020
- Monarchs: Muhammad V (2018–2019); Abdullah (2019–2020)
- Prime Minister: Mahathir Mohamad
- Deputy: Tengku Zulpuri Shah Raja Puji
- Preceded by: Maximus Ongkili (Water); Wan Junaidi Tuanku Jaafar (Natural Resources)
- Succeeded by: Shamsul Anuar Nasarah (Minister of Energy and Natural Resources); Tuan Ibrahim Tuan Man (Minister of Environment and Water)
- Constituency: Kuala Langat

Member of the Selangor State Executive Council
- In office 25 March 2008 – 29 May 2013
- Monarch: Sharafuddin
- Menteri Besar: Abdul Khalid Ibrahim
- Portfolio: Health, Plantation Workers, Poverty and Friendly Government
- Preceded by: Lim Thuang Seng (Health); Kamala Ganapathy (Plantation Workers); Abd Rahman Palil (Friendly Government)
- Succeeded by: Daroyah Alwi (Health); Ganabatirau Veraman (Plantation Workers, Poverty and Friendly Government)
- Constituency: Seri Andalas

Member of the Malaysian Parliament for Kuala Langat
- In office 9 May 2018 – 19 November 2022
- Preceded by: Abdullah Sani Abdul Hamid (PR–PKR)
- Succeeded by: Ahmad Yunus Hairi (PN–PAS)
- Majority: 17,112 (2018)

Member of the Selangor State Legislative Assembly for Seri Andalas
- In office 8 March 2008 – 9 May 2018
- Preceded by: Kamala Ganapathy (BN–MIC)
- Succeeded by: constituency abolished
- Majority: 10,203 (2008); 15,633 (2013)

Personal details
- Born: Xavier Jayakumar a/l Arulanandam; 20 January 1953 (age 73) Ipoh, Perak, Federation of Malaya (now Malaysia)
- Citizenship: Malaysia
- Party: National Justice Party (keADILan) (1998–2003); People's Justice Party (PKR) (2003–2021, since 2026); Independent (2021–2022); Parti Bangsa Malaysia (PBM) (2022–2026)
- Other political affiliations: Barisan Alternatif (BA) (1998–2004); Pakatan Rakyat (PR) (2008–2015); Pakatan Harapan (PH) (2015–2021, since 2026)
- Children: Sangetha Jayakumar
- Education: Manipal College of Dental Sciences, Manipal
- Occupation: Politician
- Profession: Dentist

Xavier Jayakumar a/l Arulanandam (Tamil: சேவியர் ஜெயக்குமார், romanized: Cēviyar Jeyakkumār; born 20 January 1953) is a Malaysian politician and dentist who served as Minister of Water, Land and Natural Resources in the Pakatan Harapan (PH) administration under former prime minister Mahathir Mohamad from July 2018 to the collapse of the PH administration in February 2020, Member of Parliament (MP) for Kuala Langat from May 2018 to November 2022, Member of the Selangor State Executive Council (EXCO) in the Pakatan Rakyat (PR) state administration under former Menteri Besar Khalid Ibrahim from March 2008 to May 2013 and Member of the Selangor State Legislative Assembly (MLA) for Seri Andalas from March 2008 to May 2018. He was a member of the Parti Bangsa Malaysia (PBM). He is a member of the People's Justice Party (PKR), a component party of the PH coalition. He also served as the Vice President of PKR from November 2018 to his resignation from the party in March 2021. He is the father of the Vice Women Chief of PKR Sangetha Jayakumar.

== Political career ==
Xavier Jayakumar contested the 2004 Malaysian general election in the Ampang which saw him lose to Barisan Nasional candidate, Rozaidah Talib.

After fail elected in Parliamentary seat, he has contested the Selangor State Legislative Assembly seat, Seri Andalas. Fate has sided with him and won the seat in the 2008 Selangor state election. After winning, he was appointed a Member of the Selangor State Executive Council and was in charge of Health, Plantation Workers, Poverty and Friendly Government portfolio.

In the 2013 Selangor state election, he managed to defend the Seri Andalas seat in a 5-cornered contest and was not appointed as Member of the Selangor State Executive Council.

=== Minister of Water, Land and Natural Resources (2018–2020) ===
He had proposed to amend the National Land Code passed in 2014 which allows the ownership of land to foreign citizens and companies through Section 433B with the approval of the state government.

On 1 May 2019, Xavier gave himself a rating of seven to eight out of 10 for his performance as the Water, Land and Natural Resources Minister in the Pakatan Harapan government, after being in the position for about a year.

=== People's Justice Party and defection ===
He was the Vice President of PKR. In the 2018 Malaysian general election, he was appointed the Pakatan Harapan Election Director for the Selangor state.

On 17 February 2021, a person he described as a fellow party member and "close family friend" was arrested with two others by the Malaysian Anti-Corruption Commission in relation to a contract awarded in 2019 under the jurisdiction of his ministry.

On 13 March 2021, he suddenly announced that he resigned as both a member and as a party vice-president, citing that he was "extremely frustrated" by the events of the past year. Subsequently, he would become an independent MP while declaring his full support to Perikatan Nasional's leadership.

On the same day, PKR MP for Sungai Buloh Sivarasa Rasiah claimed that Xavier defected due to pressure arising from the Malaysian Anti-Corruption Commission's investigation into a contract awarded in 2019 to several people including Xavier's "close family friend" during his tenure as minister.

It is speculated that Xavier Jayakumar had returned to PKR due to he appeared at 2025 PKR national congress in Johor Bahru, however PKR Secretary-general Fuziah Salleh denied the rumours.

== Election results ==
Parliament of Malaysia
Year	Constituency	Candidate	Votes	Pct	Opponent(s)	Votes	Pct	Ballots cast	Majority	Turnout
2004	P099 Ampang	Xavier Jayakumar Arulanandam (PKR)	13,482	28.87%	Rozaidah Talib (UMNO)	33,214	71.13%	47,479	19,732	71.26%
2018	P112 Kuala Langat	Xavier Jayakumar Arulanandam (PKR)	43,239	49.08%	Shahril Sufian Hamdan (UMNO)	26,127	29.66%	89,437	17,112	87.34%
2018	P112 Kuala Langat	Xavier Jayakumar Arulanandam (PKR)	43,239	49.08%	Yahya Baba (PAS)	18,731	21.26%	89,437	17,112	87.34%

Selangor State Legislative Assembly
Year	Constituency	Candidate	Votes	Pct	Opponent(s)	Votes	Pct	Ballots cast	Majority	Turnout
2008	N49 Seri Andalas	Xavier Jayakumar Arulanandam (PKR)	20,258	66.83%	Kamala Ganapathy (MIC)	10,055	33.17%	31,039	10,203	79.93%
2013	N49 Seri Andalas	Xavier Jayakumar Arulanandam (PKR)	31,491	64.43%	Mohan Thangarasu (MIC)	15,858	32.45%	49,552	15,633	87.30%
2013	N49 Seri Andalas	Xavier Jayakumar Arulanandam (PKR)	31,491	64.43%	Hanafiah Husin (IND)	871	1.78%	49,552	15,633	87.30%
2013	N49 Seri Andalas	Xavier Jayakumar Arulanandam (PKR)	31,491	64.43%	Uthayakumar Ponnusamy (IND)	614	1.26%	49,552	15,633	87.30%
2013	N49 Seri Andalas	Xavier Jayakumar Arulanandam (PKR)	31,491	64.43%	Kottappan Suppaiah (IND)	41	0.08%	49,552	15,633	87.30%

== Honours ==
=== Honour of Malaysia ===
- Kelantan
  - Knight Commander of the Order of the Life of the Crown of Kelantan (DJMK) – Dato' (2019)
