= Wan Dzahanurin Ahmad =

Malaysian politician

Yang Berhormat Tuan Wan Dzahanurin Ahmad PPN MLA

Member of the Selangor State Legislative Assembly for Sungai Kandis
- Incumbent
- Assumed office 12 August 2023
- Preceded by: Zawawi Mughni (PH–PKR)
- Majority: 167 (2023)

Personal details
- Born: Wan Dzahanurin bin Ahmad
- Citizenship: Malaysian
- Party: Malaysian United Indigenous Party (BERSATU)
- Other political affiliations: Perikatan Nasional (PN)
- Occupation: Politician

Wan Dzahanurin bin Ahmad is a Malaysian politician who has served as Member of the Selangor State Legislative Assembly (MLA) for Sungai Kandis since August 2023. He is a member and Division Chief of Kota Raja of the Malaysian United Indigenous Party (BERSATU), a component party of the Perikatan Nasional (PN) and formerly Pakatan Harapan (PH) coalitions. He previously served as Member of the Shah Alam City Council (MBSA) and Division Deputy Chairman of PH of Kota Raja.

== Political career ==
=== Member of the Selangor State Legislative Assembly (since 2023) ===
==== 2023 Selangor state election ====
In the 2023 Selangor state election, Wan Dzahanurin made his electoral debut after being nominated by PN to contest the Sungai Kandis state seat. Wan Dzahanurin won the seat and was elected to the Selangor State Legislative Assembly as the Sungai Kandis MLA for the first term after narrowly defeating Zawawi Mughni of Pakatan Harapan (PH) by a majority of only 167 votes. However, his victory was controversial as the PH supporters protested about an alleged discrepancy and claimed that the unreturned ballots did not tally with the official results. There was also initially a plan by PH to challenge by filing an election petition against the results but subsequently PH did not go ahead with the plan.

== Election results ==
Selangor State Legislative Assembly
Year	Constituency	Candidate	Votes	Pct	Opponent(s)	Votes	Pct	Ballots cast	Majority	Turnout
2023	N49 Sungai Kandis	Wan Dzahanurin Ahmad (BERSATU)	28,926	49.01%	Zawawi Mughni (PKR)	28,759	48.72%	59,026	167	75.09%
2023	N49 Sungai Kandis	Wan Dzahanurin Ahmad (BERSATU)	28,926	49.01%	Afriena Shaqira Sariff (MUDA)	1,341	2.27%	59,026	167	75.09%

== Honours ==
- Malaysia
  - Medal of the Order of the Defender of the Realm (PPN) (2021)
