= Gunarajah George =

Malaysian politician

Yang Berhormat Tuan Gunarajah George MLA
- குணராஜா ஜார்ஜ்

Member of the Selangor State Legislative Assembly for Sentosa
- Incumbent
- Assumed office 9 May 2018
- Preceded by: Position established
- Majority: 33,600 (2018); 46,349 (2023)

Personal details
- Citizenship: Malaysian
- Party: People's Justice Party (PKR)
- Other political affiliations: Pakatan Harapan (PH)
- Occupation: Politician

Gunarajah a/l George is a Malaysian politician who has served as Member of the Selangor State Legislative Assembly (MLA) for Sentosa since May 2018. He is member and Branch Chief of Kota Raja of the People's Justice Party (PKR), a component of the Pakatan Harapan (PH) coalition.

== Political career ==
Gunarajah was elected as Kota Raja PKR Branch Chief in 2025. In May 2025 party election, he was elected as member of central leadership council of PKR.

== Election results ==
Selangor State Legislative Assembly
Year	Constituency	Candidate	Votes	Pct	Opponent(s)	Votes	Pct	Ballots cast	Majority	Turnout
2018	N48 Sentosa	Gunarajah George (PKR)	38,106	85.62%	Subramaniam Retam (MIC)	4,506	10.16%	44,944	33,600	87.36%
2018	N48 Sentosa	Gunarajah George (PKR)	38,106	85.62%	Rajan Manikesavan (PAS)	1,722	3.87%	44,944	33,600	87.36%
2018	N48 Sentosa	Gunarajah George (PKR)	38,106	85.62%	Sundarajoo Periasamy (IND)	95	0.21%	44,944	33,600	87.36%
2018	N48 Sentosa	Gunarajah George (PKR)	38,106	85.62%	Telaiamblam Mariappan (PRM)	79	0.18%	44,944	33,600	87.36%
2023	N48 Sentosa	Gunarajah George (PKR)	54,601	83.53%	Parameswaran Ganason (Gerakan)	8,252	12.62%	65,873	46,349	72.97%
2023	N48 Sentosa	Gunarajah George (PKR)	54,601	83.53%	Thanusha Ramanieswaran (MUDA)	2,357	3.61%	65,873	46,349	72.97%
2023	N48 Sentosa	Gunarajah George (PKR)	54,601	83.53%	Jeichandran Wadivelu (PRM)	156	0.24%	65,873	46,349	72.97%
