= 2018 Sungai Kandis by-election =

- 4 August 2018

N49 Sungai Kandis seat in the Selangor State Legislative Assembly
	First party	Second party	Third party
	PH	BN	IND
Candidate	Zawawi Mughni	Lokman Noor Adam	Murthy Krishnasamy
Party	PKR	UMNO	Independent
Alliance	PH	BN
Popular vote	15,427	9,585	97
Percentage	60.72%	38.17%	0.39%
- N49 Sungai Kandis state constituency boundaries within the Kota Raja parliamentary constituency
Sungai Kandis assemblyman before election
Mat Shuhaimi Shafiei (died)
Pakatan Harapan (PKR)
Elected Sungai Kandis assemblyman
Zawawi Ahmad Mughni
Pakatan Harapan (PKR)

A by-election was held on 4 August 2018 for the Selangor State Legislative Assembly seat of Sungai Kandis. The seat became vacant after the death of the former assemblyman, Mat Shuhaimi Shafiei from lymphatic cancer on 2 July 2018. Mat Shuhaimi was a member of the Parti Keadilan Rakyat, a component party of the state ruling Pakatan Harapan coalition. He won his seat after defeating BN, PAS and PRM candidates with a majority of 12,480 votes. It is the first by-election since the historic May 2018 general election that saw the first-ever change of federal government since independence.

The by-election was won by PKR's Zawawi Mughni amidst a drop in turnout.

== Background ==
The Sungai Kandis constituency contained the polling districts of Seksyen 34 Shah Alam, Sungai Kandis, Teluk Menegun, LLN Connought Bridge, Kampung Pandan, Kampung Jawa, Kota Raja, Taman Seri Andalas 1, Taman Seri Andalas 2, Taman Klang Jaya 1, Sentosa Dato Yusof Shahbuddin, Bukit Jati, Taman Seri Andalas 3, Taman Desawan, Sentosa Dato Abdul Hamid 1, Sentosa Dato Dagang, Jalan Raya Timur, Taman Klang Jaya 2, Sentosa Dato Abdul Hamid 2, Taman Maznah, Taman Menara Maju. It encompassed the southern part of Shah Alam and part of Klang City around Jalan Kebun.

The electoral roll to be used for this by-election was from the first quarter of 2018, last updated on 2 July 2018. The electoral roll contained 51,230 registered voters comprising 51,217 ordinary voters and 13 overseas voters. There was no early voters in the by-election, while the overseas and domestic postal voting applications was opened from 8 to 21 July. The Tanjung Hall of the Shah Alam City Council was used as the nomination centre and the official vote tallying centre.

It was estimated that the by-election would cost RM1.4 million. The EC also made several improvements for this by-election, including setting up two polling lanes for voters aged 60 and above, and adding more polling lanes at polling centres that had many voters. A total of 21 new lanes were created to avoid overcrowding of the voting lanes, making it a total of 109 lanes compared to 88 during the 2018 Malaysian general election.

The polling hours was extended from 8 am to 5.30 pm instead of 5pm in the general election. Any non-governmental organisations meeting the conditions were also allowed to observe the election process from the nomination day until the election results were announced.

=== Last election results ===
2018 Selangor state election: Sungai Kandis
Party	Candidate	Votes	%	±%
PH (PKR)	Mat Shuhaimi Shafiei	23,998	55.60	▼8.83
BN	Kamaruzzaman Johari	11,518	26.68	▼5.77
PAS	Mohd Yusof Abdullah	7,573	17.54	N/A
PRM	Hanafiah Husin	76	0.18	▼1.60
Total valid votes		43,165	100.00	
Rejected ballots		305	0.71	▼0.48
Majority		12,480	28.91	▼3.07
Turnout		43,585	85.80	▼1.50
Registered electors		50,800		
PH hold		Swing	▼1.53	

== Timeline ==
Date	Event
21 July 2018	Nomination day
21 July - 4 August 2018	Campaigning period
n/a	Early voting for postal and advance voters
4 August 2018	Polling day

== Nomination ==
The nomination day for the elections was on 21 July 2018. The nomination for the by-election begun at 9am at Tanjung Hall in Section 19. As initially expected, the by-election was a straight contest between the Pakatan Harapan and Barisan Nasional, with PAS bowing out to make way for BN. Three candidates were contesting the seat. PKR chose Zawawi Mughni as their candidate for the by-election. Barisan Nasional chose Lokman Noor Adam, an UMNO Supreme Council member as their candidate. Independent Murthy Krishnasamy was the third candidate for the by-election.

=== Candidates ===
Qualified candidates

#	Candidates	Party	Alliance	Age	Occupation	Other background
1	Zawawi Mughni	People's Justice Party	Pakatan Harapan	47–48	Religious teacher	PKR Religious Understanding and Consolidation Bureau (BIPPA) secretary
2	Murthy Krishnasamy	Independent		59–60	Pensioner	Former Selangor government staff
3	Lokman Noor Adam	United Malays National Organisation	Barisan Nasional	44–45	NGO member	Sacked former Finance Ministry's strategic communications director Founder of NGO Pemantau Malaysia Baru; Former PKR member, joined UMNO in 2007

Withdrew

- Ahmad Kamaruddin: Parti Rakyat Malaysia member.

== Campaign ==
The Pakatan Harapan candidate used the PKR logo as part of their campaign instead of the Pakatan Harapan logo as this logo was more recognised by the electorate of this constituency.

== Results ==
Zawawi Mughni won the by-election with a majority of 5,842 votes. PAS supporters were split between PH and BN despite PAS leadership's explicit support for the BN candidate.

Selangor state by-election, 4 August 2018: Sungai Kandis Upon the death of incumbent, Mat Shuhaimi Shafiei
Party	Candidate	Votes	%	∆%
PH	Zawawi Mughni	15,427	61.44	▲5.84
BN	Lokman Noor Adam	9,585	38.17	▲11.49
Independent	Murti Krishnasamy	97	0.39	N/A
Total valid votes		25,109	100.00	
Total rejected ballots		173	0.69	▼0.02
Unreturned ballots		21		
Turnout		25,303	49.39	▼36.45
Registered electors		51,230		
Majority		5,842	23.27	▼5.64
PH hold		Swing		▼5.84
Source(s) "Federal Government Gazette - Notice of Contested Election - By-election of the State Legislative Assembly of N.49 Sungai Kandis for the State of Selangor [P.U. (B) 430/2018]" (PDF). Attorney General's Chambers of Malaysia. 23 July 2018. "Federal Government Gazette - Results of Contested Election and Statement of the Poll after the Official Addition of Votes for the By-election of N.49 Sungai Kandis [P.U. (B) 475/2018]" (PDF). Attorney General's Chambers of Malaysia. 6 August 2018.

=== Results according to polling districts ===
Voting District Code	Voting District	Party
	Post Votes	PKR
111/49/01	Seksyen 34 Shah Alam	PKR
111/49/02	Sungai Kandis	PKR
111/49/03	Teluk Menegun	PKR
111/49/04	LLN Connought Bridge	PKR
111/49/05	Kampung Pandan	BN
111/49/06	Kampung Jawa	PKR
111/49/07	Kota Raja	PKR
111/49/08	Taman Seri Andalas 1	PKR
111/49/09	Taman Seri Andalas 2	PKR
111/49/10	Bukit Jati	PKR
111/49/11	Taman Seri Andalas 3	PKR
111/49/12	Jalan Raya Timur	PKR
111/49/13	Bandar Puteri Klang	PKR
111/49/14	Jalan Kebun	PKR
111/49/15	Johan Setia	BN
111/49/16	Seri Gambut	BN
111/49/17	Kampung Bukit Naga	BN
111/49/18	Haji Husin Jalan Kebun	PKR
111/49/19	Taman Berjaya	PKR
