= Sungai Kandis =

State constituency in Selangor, Malaysia

Sungai Kandis (N49)
Selangor constituency

State constituency
- Legislature: Selangor State Legislative Assembly
MLA
Wan Dzahanurin Ahmad
PN
- Constituency created: 2018
- First contested: 2018
- Last contested: 2023

Demographics
- Electors (2023): 78,605

Sungai Kandis is a state constituency in Selangor, Malaysia, that has been represented in the Selangor State Legislative Assembly since 2004. The seat was called Seri Andalas prior to the 2018 redelineation. It has been represented by Wan Dzahanurin Ahmad of Perikatan Nasional (PN) since 2023.

The state constituency was created in the 2003 redistribution and is mandated to return a single member to the Selangor State Legislative Assembly under the first past the post voting system.

== Demographics ==
Ethnic breakdown of Sungai Kandis's electorate as of 2023
1. Malay (69.0%)
2. Indian (15.2%)
3. Chinese (13.0%)
4. Other ethnicities (2.90%)

== History ==
=== Polling districts ===
According to the federal gazette issued on 30 March 2018, the Sungai Kandis constituency is divided into 19 polling districts.

State constituency	Polling Districts	Code	Location
Sungai Kandis (N49）	Seksyen 34 Shah Alam	111/49/01	Dewan Pusat Latihan Teknologi Tinggi (ADTEC) Seksyen 34 Shah Alam
Sungai Kandis (N49）	Sungai Kandis	111/49/02	SRA Sungai Kandis Klang
Sungai Kandis (N49）	Teluk Menegun	111/49/03	SK Telok Menegon Klang
Sungai Kandis (N49）	LLN Connught Bridge	111/49/04	SRA Hajah Fatimah Kampong Datok Dagang Kelang
Sungai Kandis (N49）	Kampung Pandan	111/49/05	SA Rakyat (KAFA Integrasi) Kampung Pandan
Sungai Kandis (N49）	Kampung Jawa	111/49/06	Kolej Islam Sultan Alam Shah Klang
Sungai Kandis (N49）	Kota Raja	111/49/07	SMA Tinggi Sultan Hishamuddin
Sungai Kandis (N49）	Taman Seri Andalas 1	111/49/08	SK Taman Sri Andalas Klang
Sungai Kandis (N49）	Taman Seri Andalas 2	111/49/09	SMK Seri Andalas Klang
Sungai Kandis (N49）	Bukit Jati	111/49/10	SRA Kampung Jawa
Sungai Kandis (N49）	Taman Seri Andalas 3	111/49/11	SJK (T) Simpang Jawa
Sungai Kandis (N49）	Jalan Raya Timur	111/49/12	SM (Psdn) Chung Hua
Sungai Kandis (N49）	Bandar Puteri Klang	111/49/13	Dewan Serbaguna Klang Jaya
Sungai Kandis (N49）	Jalan Kebun	111/49/14	SK Jalan Kebun
Sungai Kandis (N49）	Johan Setia	111/49/15	SK Kampung Johan Setia Klang
Sungai Kandis (N49）	Seri Gambut	111/49/16	SRA Bukit Naga Batu 6 Klang
Sungai Kandis (N49）	Kampung Bukit Naga	111/49/17	SK Bukit Naga Batu 6
Sungai Kandis (N49）	Haji Husin Jalan Kebun	111/49/18	SRA Jalan Kebun
Sungai Kandis (N49）	Taman Berjaya	111/49/19	SMK Jalan Kebun

=== Representation history ===
Members of the Legislative Assembly for Sungai Kandis
Assembly	No	Years	Member	Party
Constituency created from Seri Andalas and Sri Muda
14th	N49	2018	Shuhaimi Shafiei	PH (PKR)
14th	N49	2018–2023	Zawawi Mughni	PH (PKR)
15th	N49	2023–present	Wan Dzahanurin Ahmad	PN (BERSATU)

== Election results ==
Selangor state election, 2023: Sungai Kandis
Party	Candidate	Votes	%	∆%
PN	Wan Dzahanurin Ahmad	28,926	49.01	▲49.01
PH	Zawawi Mughni	28,759	48.72	▲48.72
MUDA	Afriena Shaqira Sariff	1,341	2.27	▲2.27
Total valid votes		59,026	100.00	
Total rejected ballots		304		
Unreturned ballots		110		
Turnout		59,440	75.62	▲26.23
Registered electors		78,605		
Majority		167	0.29	▼22.98
PN gain from PKR		Swing		?

Selangor state by-election, 4 August 2018: Sungai Kandis Upon the death of incumbent, Mat Shuhaimi Shafiei
Party	Candidate	Votes	%	∆%
PKR	Zawawi Mughni	15,427	61.44	▲5.84
BN	Lokman Noor Adam	9,585	38.17	▲11.49
Independent	Murti Krishnasamy	97	0.39	▲0.39
Total valid votes		25,109	100.00	
Total rejected ballots		173	0.69	
Unreturned ballots		21		
Turnout		25,303	49.39	▼36.45
Registered electors		51,230		
Majority		5,842	23.27	▼5.64
PKR hold		Swing		
Source(s) "Federal Government Gazette - Notice of Contested Election - By-election of the State Legislative Assembly of N.49 Sungai Kandis for the State of Selangor [P.U. (B) 430/2018]" (PDF). Attorney General's Chambers of Malaysia. 23 July 2018. "Federal Government Gazette - Results of Contested Election and Statement of the Poll after the Official Addition of Votes for the By-election of N.49 Sungai Kandis [P.U. (B) 475/2018]" (PDF). Attorney General's Chambers of Malaysia. 6 August 2018.

Selangor state election, 2018: Sungai Kandis
Party	Candidate	Votes	%
PKR	Shuhaimi Shafiei	23,998	55.60
BN	Kamaruzzaman Johari	11,518	26.68
PAS	Mohd Yusof Abdullah	7,573	17.54
Parti Rakyat Malaysia	Hanafiah Husin	76	0.18
Total valid votes		43,165	100.00
Total rejected ballots		305	0.71
Unreturned ballots		115	
Turnout		43,585	85.80
Registered electors		50,800	
Majority		12,480	28.91
This was a new constituency created.
