= Ganabatirau Veraman =

Malaysian politician

Yang Berhormat Tuan Ganabatirau Veraman MP
- கணபதிராவ் வேராமன்

Member of the Selangor State Executive Council (Estate Workers, Poverty and Caring Government : 30 May 2013 – 18 May 2018) (Socioeconomic Empowerment, Development and Caring Government : 19 May 2018 – 21 August 2023)
- In office 30 May 2013 – 21 August 2023
- Monarch: Sharafuddin
- Menteri Besar: Khalid Ibrahim (2013–2014); Azmin Ali (2014–2018); Amirudin Shari (2018–2023)
- Preceded by: Xavier Jayakumar Arulanandam
- Constituency: Kota Alam Shah (2013–2018); Kota Kemuning (2018–2023)

Assistant National Publicity Secretary of the Democratic Action Party
- In office 20 March 2022 – 16 March 2025 Serving with Hannah Yeoh Tseow Suan
- Secretary-General: Anthony Loke Siew Fook
- National Publicity Secretary: Teo Nie Ching
- Preceded by: Yeo Bee Yin
- Succeeded by: Wong Shu Qi

State Deputy Chairman of the Democratic Action Party of Selangor
- Incumbent
- Assumed office 10 November 2024
- Secretary-General: Anthony Loke Siew Fook
- State Chairman: Ng Sze Han
- Preceded by: Ean Yong Hian Wah

Member of the Malaysian Parliament for Klang
- Incumbent
- Assumed office 19 November 2022
- Preceded by: Charles Santiago (PH–DAP)
- Majority: 91,801 (2022)

Member of the Selangor State Legislative Assembly for Kota Kemuning
- In office 9 May 2018 – 12 August 2023
- Preceded by: Position established
- Succeeded by: Preakas Sampunathan (PH–DAP)
- Majority: 21,639 (2018)

Member of the Selangor State Legislative Assembly for Kota Alam Shah
- In office 5 May 2013 – 9 May 2018
- Preceded by: Manoharan Malayalam (PR–DAP)
- Succeeded by: Position abolished
- Majority: 13,369 (2013)

Faction represented in Selangor State Legislative Assembly
- 2013–2018: Democratic Action Party
- 2018–2023: Pakatan Harapan

Personal details
- Born: Ganabatirau s/o Veraman; 6 June 1973 (age 53) Teluk Intan, Perak, Malaysia
- Citizenship: Malaysian
- Party: Democratic Action Party (DAP)
- Other political affiliations: Pakatan Rakyat (PR) (2008–2015); Pakatan Harapan (PH) (since 2015)
- Spouse: Buvaneswary Balasubramaniam
- Relations: Papparaidu Veraman (younger brother)
- Children: Janany; Gowri; Narmatha; Srinivasarau
- Occupation: Politician

Ganabatirau s/o Veraman (Tamil: கணபதிராவ் வேராமன், romanized: ganapatirau veeraman; born 6 June 1973) is a Malaysian politician who has served as the Member of Parliament (MP) for Klang since November 2022. He served as Member of the Selangor State Executive Council (EXCO) in the Pakatan Rakyat (PR) and Pakatan Harapan (PH) state administrations under Menteris Besar Khalid Ibrahim, Azmin Ali and Amirudin Shari from May 2013 to August 2023, Member of the Selangor State Legislative Assembly (MLA) for Kota Kemuning from May 2018 to August 2023 and for Kota Alam Shah from May 2013 to May 2018. He is a member of the Democratic Action Party (DAP), a component party of the PH and formerly PR coalitions. He has served as the State Deputy Chairman of DAP of Selangor since November 2024. He served as the Assistant National Publicity Secretary of DAP from March 2022 to March 2025 and the State Vice Chairman of DAP of Selangor prior to his promotion to the State Deputy Chairman in November 2024. He is also the older brother of Papparaidu Veraman, Selangor EXCO Member and Banting MLA.

== Personal background ==
Born and raised in Teluk Intan, Perak, Ganabatirau excelled at school and became a lawyer.

== Political career ==
Ganabatirau's political career started during his teenage years for more than thirty years following his grandfather's legacy as a Freedom Fighter of Malaysia. He became active in non-governmental organisation (NGOs) committed to increase the awareness of human rights and heritage in a multiracial Malaysia. Between April and May 2006, several legal Hindu temples were demolished by city hall authorities in Malaysia. On 21 April 2006, the Malaimel Sri Selva Kaliamman Temple in Kuala Lumpur was reduced to rubble its the city hall sent in bulldozers. Ganabatirau and thirty Hindu NGOS joined as a coalition named The Hindu Rights Action Force or HINDRAF, a coalition of several NGOs have protested these demolitions by lodging complaints with the Prime Minister of Malaysia but have received no response. According to a lawyer for HINDRAF, a Hindu temple is demolished in Malaysia every three weeks. Ganabatirau was a dominant figure in HINDRAF followed by Waytha Moorthy Ponnusamy, Manoharan Malayaram and Uthayakumar Ponnusamy organised a series of peaceful weekend Human rights forums throughout Malaysia to increase the awareness of Hindu human rights.

On 23 November 2007, Ganabatirau, together with two HINDRAF lawyers Waytha Moorthy, and Uthayakumar, were arrested and charged under the Sedition Act/Internal Security Act (ISA). However, in a series of repeated arrests and releases, the courts could not prove that they had incited racial hatred. The only evidence against them were unreliable translations of their Tamil speeches into Bahasa Malaysia presented by the Attorney-General's Chambers, which the courts deemed as unverifiable. Eventually, they were all acquitted due to a shaky prosecution and the lack of evidence of any wrongdoing or crime. They were released on 5 April 2009 after Datuk Seri Najib Razak became Prime Minister of Malaysia.

Ganabatirau was then recruited into DAP shortly after his release from Kamunting Detention Centre, a Supermax prison located near the town of Taiping, Perak. While running his own law firm, he also volunteered to be appointed as a councillor of the Shah Alam City Council and help DAP to solve local issues in Shah Alam. In the 2013 general election, Ganabatirau contested for the first time and won the State Constituency for Kota Alam Shah on a DAP ticket and was promoted to be one of the EXCO member of Selangor State government.

During Ganabatirau's first tenure as EXCO of Selangor State Government, Selangor experienced a period of rapid economic growth and restructuring and Ganabatirau said that his main priorities were to solve poverty issues, school and education's funding, flash floods, water provision, temple's land issue and Malaysian Birth certification/Identification Card issues.

== Election results ==
Selangor State Legislative Assembly
Year	Constituency	Candidate	Votes	Pct	Opponent(s)	Votes	Pct	Ballots cast	Majority	Turnout
2013	N48 Kota Alam Shah	Ganabatirau Veraman (DAP)	18,971	76.37%	Maglin Dennis D'Cruz (PPP)	5,602	22.55%	25,227	13,369	85.60%
2013	N48 Kota Alam Shah	Ganabatirau Veraman (DAP)	18,971	76.37%	Loo Hok Chai (IND)	186	0.75%	25,227	13,369	85.60%
2013	N48 Kota Alam Shah	Ganabatirau Veraman (DAP)	18,971	76.37%	Pannerselvam G. Letchumanan (IND)	82	0.33%	25,227	13,369	85.60%
2018	N50 Kota Kemuning	Ganabatirau Veraman (DAP)	28,617	70.63%	Burhan Adnan (PAS)	6,978	17.22%	43,369	21,639	92.71%
2018	N50 Kota Kemuning	Ganabatirau Veraman (DAP)	28,617	70.63%	Tiew Hock Huat (Gerakan)	4,601	11.36%	43,369	21,639	92.71%
2018	N50 Kota Kemuning	Ganabatirau Veraman (DAP)	28,617	70.63%	Abdul Razak Ismail (PSM)	226	0.56%	43,369	21,639	92.71%
2018	N50 Kota Kemuning	Ganabatirau Veraman (DAP)	28,617	70.63%	Rajasekaran Soundarapandy (IND)	93	0.23%	43,369	21,639	92.71%

Parliament of Malaysia
Year	Constituency	Candidate	Votes	Pct	Opponent(s)	Votes	Pct	Ballots cast	Majority	Turnout
2022	P110 Klang	Ganabatirau Veraman (DAP)	115,539	70.49%	Jaya Chandran Perumal (BERSATU)	23,738	14.48%	165,554	91,801	78.46%
2022	P110 Klang	Ganabatirau Veraman (DAP)	115,539	70.49%	Tee Hooi Ling (MCA)	19,762	12.06%	165,554	91,801	78.46%
2022	P110 Klang	Ganabatirau Veraman (DAP)	115,539	70.49%	Hedrhin Ramli @ Awin (IND)	3,016	1.84%	165,554	91,801	78.46%
2022	P110 Klang	Ganabatirau Veraman (DAP)	115,539	70.49%	Loo Cheng Wee (WARISAN)	1,140	0.70%	165,554	91,801	78.46%
2022	P110 Klang	Ganabatirau Veraman (DAP)	115,539	70.49%	Deepak Jaikishan (IND)	439	0.27%	165,554	91,801	78.46%
2022	P110 Klang	Ganabatirau Veraman (DAP)	115,539	70.49%	Chandra Sivarajan (PRM)	271	0.17%	165,554	91,801	78.46%

== Honours ==
=== Honours of Malaysia ===
- Malaysia
  - Recipient of the 17th Yang di-Pertuan Agong Installation Medal (2024)
