= Preakas Sampunathan =

Malaysian politician and lawyer

Yang Berhormat Tuan Preakas Sampunathan MLA
- பிரேகாஸ் சாம்புநாதன்
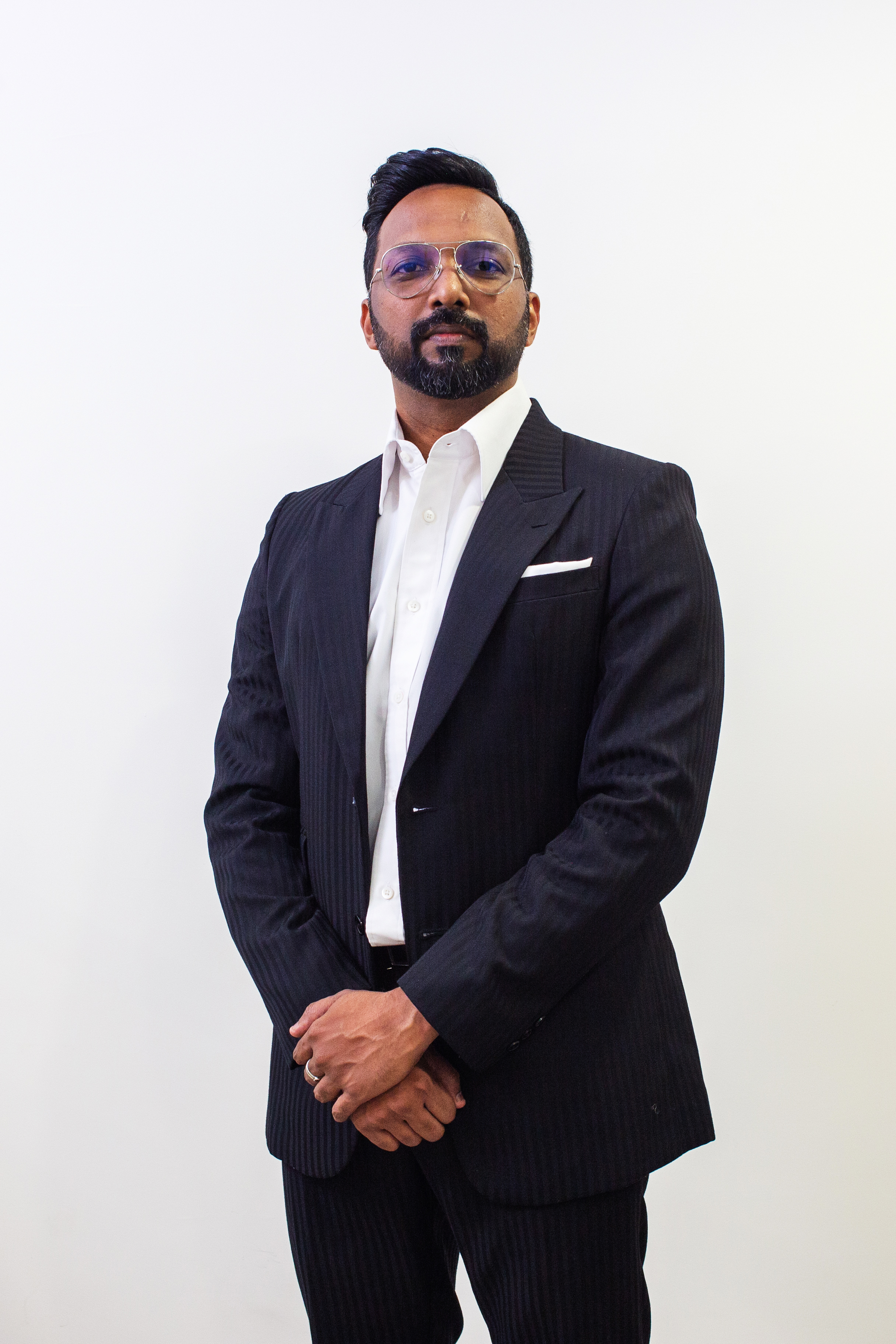

Member of the Selangor State Legislative Assembly for Kota Kemuning
- Incumbent
- Assumed office 12 August 2023
- Preceded by: Ganabatirau Veraman (PH–DAP)
- Majority: 24,288 (2023)

Personal details
- Born: Preakas Sampunathan; 7 April 1982 (age 44) Penang, Malaysia
- Citizenship: Malaysian
- Party: Democratic Action Party (DAP)
- Other political affiliations: Pakatan Harapan (PH)
- Education: Kulim National Secondary School
- Alma mater: Northumbria University
- Occupation: Politician
- Profession: Lawyer

Preakas Sampunathan (born 7 April 1982) is a Malaysian politician and lawyer who has served as Member of the Selangor State Legislative Assembly (MLA) for Kota Kemuning since August 2023. He is a member of the Democratic Action Party (DAP), a component party of the Pakatan Harapan (PH) and formerly Pakatan Rakyat (PR) coalitions.

== Family and education ==
Preakas was born into a middle family as the eldest among six children of his parents. His father was a lorry driver while his mother was a rubber tapper.

== Political career ==
=== Member of the Selangor State Legislative Assembly (since 2023) ===
==== 2023 Selangor state election ====
In the 2023 Selangor state election, Preakas made his electoral debut after being nominated by PH to contest the Kota Kemuning state seat. Preakas won the seat and was elected to the Selangor State Legislative Assembly as the Kota Kemuning MLA for the first term after defeating Jimmy Chew Jyh Gang of Perikatan Nasional (PN) and K. Gunasekaran Kuppan of Parti Rakyat Malaysia (PRM) by a majority of 24,288 votes.

As the Kota Kemuning MLA, Preakas promised to resolve traffic congestion, which was the biggest problem in Kota Kemuning in his opinion. Preakas added that there were only a few roads leading to main highways which resulted in lack of accessibility to Kota Kemuning.

== Election results ==
Selangor State Legislative Assembly
Year	Constituency	Candidate	Votes	Pct	Opponent(s)	Votes	Pct	Ballots cast	Majority	Turnout
2023	N50 Kota Kemuning	Preakas Sampunathan (PH-DAP)	41,254	70.08%	Jimmy Chew Jyh Gang (PN-GERAKAN)	16,966	28.82%	58,871	24,288	71.84%
2023	N50 Kota Kemuning	Preakas Sampunathan (PH-DAP)	41,254	70.08%	K. Gunasekaran Kuppan (PRM)	651	1.11%	58,871	24,288	71.84%
