= Kota Kemuning (state constituency) =

Kota Kemuning (N50)
Selangor constituency

State constituency
- Legislature: Selangor State Legislative Assembly
MLA
Preakas Sampunathan
PH
- Constituency created: 2018
- First contested: 2018
- Last contested: 2023

Demographics
- Electors (2023): 81,946

Kota Kemuning is a state constituency in Selangor, Malaysia, that has been represented in the Selangor State Legislative Assembly since 2018.

The state constituency was created in the 2018 redistribution and is mandated to return a single member to the Selangor State Legislative Assembly under the first past the post voting system.

== Demographics ==
Ethnic breakdown of Kota Kemuning's electorate as of 2023
1. Malay (39.8%)
2. Chinese (33.4%)
3. Indian (23.1%)
4. Other ethnicities (3.76%)

== History ==
=== Polling districts ===
According to the federal gazette issued on 30 March 2018, the Kota Kemuning constituency is divided into 14 polling districts.

| State constituency | Polling Districts | Code | Location |
|---|---|---|---|
| Kota Kemuning（N50） | Shah Alam S 27 A | 111/50/01 | SK Hicom Seksyen 27 Shah Alam |
| Kota Kemuning（N50） | Shah Alam S 28 | 111/50/02 | SK Taman Alam Megah |
| Kota Kemuning（N50） | Sri Muda 1 | 111/50/03 | SK Taman Sri Muda |
| Kota Kemuning（N50） | Sri Muda 2 Utara | 111/50/04 | SK Taman Sri Muda (2) |
| Kota Kemuning（N50） | Bukit Kemuning | 111/50/05 | SJK (C) Khe Beng Batu 8 |
| Kota Kemuning（N50） | Kampung Baru Hicom | 111/50/06 | Dewan Blok A, Pangsapuri PPR Hicom |
| Kota Kemuning（N50） | Putra Heights | 111/50/07 | SK Alam Megah (3) Shah Alam |
| Kota Kemuning（N50） | Sri Muda 2 Selatan | 111/50/08 | SMK Taman Sri Muda |
| Kota Kemuning（N50） | Kota Kemuning Jalan 31/1 - 31/80 | 111/50/09 | SK Bukit Kemuning |
| Kota Kemuning（N50） | Bukit Rimau | 111/50/10 | SK Bukit Rimau |
| Kota Kemuning（N50） | Shah Alam S 27 B | 111/50/11 | SK Seksyen 27 (1) Shah Alam |
| Kota Kemuning（N50） | Apartment S 28 | 111/50/12 | SMK Alam Megah 2 |
| Kota Kemuning（N50） | Kota Kemuning Jalan 31/81 - 31/170 | 111/50/13 | SK Bukit Kemuning 2 |
| Kota Kemuning（N50） | Shah Alam S 26 | 111/50/14 | SMA Hira' Shah Alam Taman Bukit Saga Seksyen 26 |

=== Representation history ===
Members of the Legislative Assembly for Kota Kemuning
| Assembly | No | Years | Member | Party |
Constituency created from Sri Muda
| 14th | N50 | 2018-2023 | Ganabatirau Veraman | PH (DAP) |
| 15th | N50 | 2023–present | Preakas Sampunathan | PH (DAP) |

== Election results ==
Selangor state election, 2023
| Party | Candidate | Votes | % | ∆% |
|---|---|---|---|---|
| PH | Preakas Sampunathan | 41,254 | 70.08 | ▼0.55 |
| PN | Jimmy Chew Jyh Gang | 16,966 | 28.81 | ▲28.81 |
| Parti Rakyat Malaysia | K Gunasekaran Kuppan | 651 | 1.11 | ▲1.11 |
| Total valid votes | | 58,871 | 100.00 | |
| Total rejected ballots | | 242 | | |
| Unreturned ballots | | 116 | | |
| Turnout | | 59,229 | 72.28 | ▼20.43 |
| Registered electors | | 81,946 | | |
| Majority | | 24,288 | 41.27 | ▼12.14 |
| PH hold | | Swing | | |

Selangor state election, 2018
| Party | Candidate | Votes | % |
|---|---|---|---|
| PKR | Ganabatirau Veraman | 28,617 | 70.63 |
| PAS | Burhan Adnan | 6,978 | 17.22 |
| BN | Tiew Hock Huat | 4,601 | 11.36 |
| Parti Sosialis Malaysia | Abdul Razak Ismail | 226 | 0.56 |
| Independent | Rajasekaran Soundarapandy | 93 | 0.23 |
| Total valid votes | | 40,515 | 100.00 |
| Total rejected ballots | | 88 | |
| Unreturned ballots | | 2,766 | |
| Turnout | | 43,369 | 92.71 |
| Registered electors | | 46,777 | |
| Majority | | 21,639 | 53.41 |
This was a new constituency created.
