= Seri Andalas (state constituency) =

Selangor constituency

Defunct state constituency
- Legislature: Selangor State Legislative Assembly
- Constituency created: 2003
- Constituency abolished: 2018
- First contested: 2004
- Last contested: 2013

Seri Andalas was a state constituency in Selangor, Malaysia, that had been represented in the Selangor State Legislative Assembly since 2004 until 2018.

The state constituency was created in the 2003 redistribution and is mandated to return a single member to the Selangor State Legislative Assembly under the first past the post voting system.

== History ==
=== Representation history ===
Members of the Legislative Assembly for Seri Andalas
Assembly	No	Years	Member	Party
Constituency created from Kota Raja
11th	N49	2004–2008	Kamala Ganapathy	BN (MIC)
12th	N49	2008–2013	Xavier Jayakumar Arulanandam	PR (PKR)
13th	N49	2013–2015	Xavier Jayakumar Arulanandam	PR (PKR)
13th	N49	2015–2018	Xavier Jayakumar Arulanandam	PH (PKR)
Constituency renamed to Sungai Kandis

== Election results ==
Selangor state election, 2013
Party	Candidate	Votes	%	∆%
PKR	Xavier Jayakumar Arulanandam	31,491	64.43	▼2.40
BN	Mohan Thangarasu	15,858	32.45	▼0.72
Independent	Hanafiah Husin	871	1.78	▲1.78
Independent	Uthayakumar Ponnusamy	614	1.26	▲1.26
Independent	Kottappan Suppaiah	41	0.08	▲0.08
Total valid votes		48,875	100.00	
Total rejected ballots		582	1.19	
Unreturned ballots		95		
Turnout		49,552	87.30	▲7.37
Registered electors		56,763		
Majority		15,633	31.99	▼1.67
PKR hold		Swing		0.84
Source(s) "Federal Government Gazette - Notice of Contested Election, State Legislative Assembly for the State of Selangor [P.U. (B) 192/2013]" (PDF). Attorney General's Chambers of Malaysia. 26 April 2013. Archived from the original (PDF) on 2019-12-29. "Federal Government Gazette - Results of Contested Election and Statements of the Poll after the Official Addition of Votes, State Constituencies for the State of Selangor [P.U. (B) 233/2013]". Attorney General's Chambers of Malaysia. 22 May 2013. Archived from the original (PDF) on 2018-10-02.

Selangor state election, 2008
Party	Candidate	Votes	%	∆%
PKR	Xavier Jayakumar Arulanandam	20,258	66.83	▲33.84
BN	Kamala Ganapathy	10,055	33.17	▼31.89
Total valid votes		30,313	100.00	
Total rejected ballots		725	2.39	
Unreturned ballots		1		
Turnout		31,039	79.93	▲3.74
Registered electors		38,833		
Majority		10,203	33.66	▲1.59
PKR gain from BN		Swing		?

Selangor state election, 2004
Party	Candidate	Votes	%
BN	Kamala Ganapathy	15,608	65.06
PKR	Tan Ah Kow	7,914	32.99
Independent	Pupalan Muthusamy	468	1.95
Total valid votes		23,990	100.00
Total rejected ballots		542	2.26
Unreturned ballots		0	
Turnout		24,532	76.19
Registered electors		32,199	
Majority		7,694	32.07
This was a new constituency created.
