= Sri Muda (state constituency) =

State constituency in Selangor, Malaysia from 2004 to 2018

Selangor constituency

Defunct state constituency
- Legislature: Selangor State Legislative Assembly
- Constituency created: 2003
- Constituency abolished: 2018
- First contested: 2004
- Last contested: 2013

Sri Muda was a state constituency in Selangor, Malaysia, that had been represented in the Selangor State Legislative Assembly since 2004 until 2018.

The state constituency was created in the 2003 redistribution and is mandated to return a single member to the Selangor State Legislative Assembly under the first past the post voting system.

== History ==
=== Representation history ===
Members of the Legislative Assembly for Sri Muda
Assembly	No	Years	Member	Party
Constituency created from Batu Tiga
11th	N50	2004–2008	Amzah Umar	BN (UMNO)
12th	N50	2008–2013	Mat Shuhaimi Shafiei	PR (PKR)
13th	N50	2013–2015	Mat Shuhaimi Shafiei	PR (PKR)
13th	N50	2015–2018	Mat Shuhaimi Shafiei	PH (PKR)
Constituency renamed Kota Kemuning

== Election results ==
Selangor state election, 2013
Party	Candidate	Votes	%	∆%
PKR	Mat Shuhaimi Shafiei	27,488	64.36	▲2.85
BN	Mohd Abdul Raof Mokhtar	14,978	35.07	▼3.42
Independent	Ramaswree Duraisamy	242	0.57	▲0.57
Total valid votes		42,708	100.00	
Total rejected ballots		390	0.91	
Unreturned ballots		63		
Turnout		43,177	87.85	▲8.29
Registered electors		49,146		
Majority		12,510	29.29	▲6.27
PKR hold		Swing		▲3.13
Source(s) "Federal Government Gazette - Notice of Contested Election, State Legislative Assembly for the State of Selangor [P.U. (B) 192/2013]" (PDF). Attorney General's Chambers of Malaysia. 26 April 2013. "Federal Government Gazette - Results of Contested Election and Statements of the Poll after the Official Addition of Votes, State Constituencies for the State of Selangor [P.U. (B) 233/2013]" (PDF). Attorney General's Chambers of Malaysia. 22 May 2013."undi.info N50 Sri Muda".

Selangor state election, 2008
Party	Candidate	Votes	%	∆%
PKR	Mat Shuhaimi Shafiei	15,962	61.51	▲28.87
BN	Amzah Umar	9,988	38.49	▼20.22
Total valid votes		25,950	100.00	
Total rejected ballots		347	1.34	
Unreturned ballots		0		
Turnout		26,297	79.56	▲2.31
Registered electors		33,054		
Majority		5,974	23.02	▼3.05
PKR gain from BN		Swing		?
Source(s) "undi.info N50 SRI MUDA".

Selangor state election, 2004
Party	Candidate	Votes	%
BN	Amzah Umar	11,715	58.71
PKR	SD Mohamad Johari Yasin	6,513	32.64
Independent	Krisnasamy Thevarayan	1,725	8.65
Total valid votes		19,953	100.00
Total rejected ballots		264	1.32
Unreturned ballots		3	
Turnout		20,220	77.25
Registered electors		26,175	
Majority		5,202	26.07
This was a new constituency created.
Source(s) "undi.info N50 SRI MUDA".
