= 2025 People's Justice Party leadership election =

Election in a political party in Malaysia

2025 People's Justice Party presidential election
- 14 March – 23 May 2025
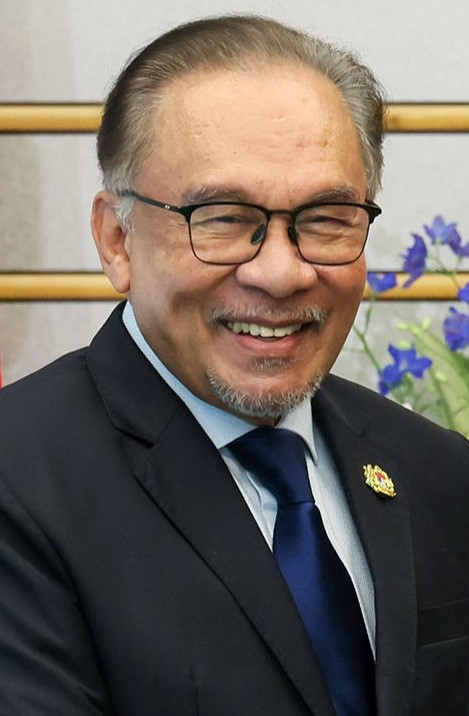
Candidate	Anwar Ibrahim
Popular vote	Unopposed
President before election
Anwar Ibrahim
Elected President
Anwar Ibrahim

A leadership election was held by the People's Justice Party (PKR) in Malaysia from 14 March to 23 May 2025 to elect new leadership at the central and branch levels.

2025 People's Justice Party deputy presidential election
- 14 March – 23 May 2025
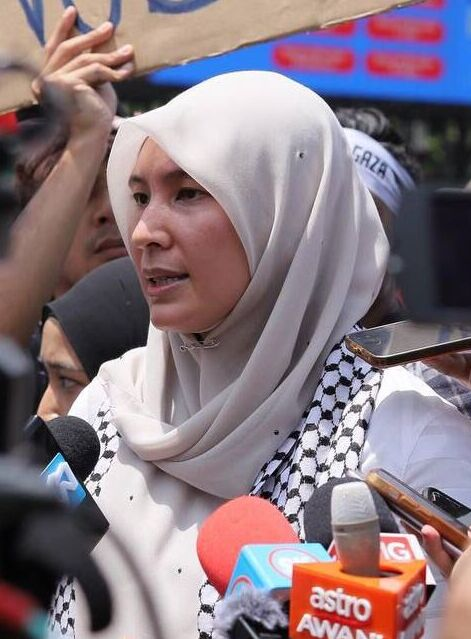

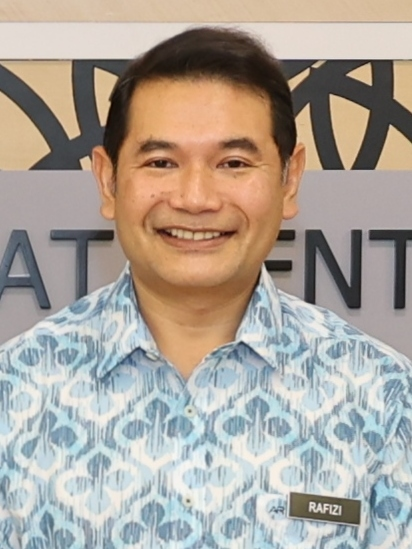
Candidate	Nurul Izzah Anwar	Mohd Rafizi Ramli
Popular vote	9,803	3,866
Percentage	71.72%	28.28%
Deputy President before election
Mohd Rafizi Ramli
Elected Deputy President
Nurul Izzah Anwar

This leadership election will be the first since party president Anwar Ibrahim became the Prime Minister of Malaysia and the second since PKR became a ruling party, after the 2018 PKR leadership election. This leadership election is considered very important for the party's direction for the next general election that will expected in 2027.

== Background and events ==
The voting of this leadership election is only opened to some delegates, instead of all party members. The number of delegates eligible to vote is expected to be more than 20,000, and each party division has 12 delegates. According to Vice President of PKR, Chang Lih Kang, this was to save time and effort while maintaining democracy.

Party chairman of the international bureau of PKR, Shamsul Iskandar Md Akin revealed the possibility that the top two party positions, the presidency and deputy presidency may not be involved in this leadership election, similar to the 2023 United Malays National Organisation leadership election.

The current president of PKR, Anwar Ibrahim won unopposed after no other candidate submitted a form to contest the position on 9 May 2025. Anwar also managed to retain his position for the third consecutive times, after the PKR leadership election held in 2018 and 2022.

This leadership election focuses on the position of Deputy President of PKR, where the daughter of the Prime Minister of Malaysia and President of PKR, Nurul Izzah Anwar, will contest the position with the incumbent, Mohd Rafizi Ramli, who is also the Minister of Economy. Minister of Home Affairs and Secretary-General of PKR, Saifuddin Nasution Ismail make the decision to withdraw from contesting the position of Deputy President of PKR in this leadership election. This decision was announced by the Special Officer to the Minister of Home Affairs, Omar Mokhtar A Manap on 9 May 2025 in a brief statement to the media. He added that the decision was taken as a result of discussions with many parties, including the top leadership of PKR.

== Campaign ==
=== HIRUK vs DAMAI ===
The leadership election saw two major factions vying for key positions within the party.

The HIRUK (lit. 'agitate') faction (Hidupkan Idealisme Reformasi dalam Ujian Kuasa) is led by Rafizi Ramli, Minister of Economy and Member of Parliament for Pandan. Among the key party figures aligned with the faction are Aminuddin Harun, Chang Lih Kang, Nik Nazmi Nik Ahmad and Rodziah Ismail. It advocates for a more confrontational approach that embodied PKR's early reformist zeal, opposing a big tent and cooperation with parties like UMNO. The campaign was themed around eliminating the alleged "cartel" surrounding PKR President Anwar Ibrahim along with alleged money politics and nepotism within the party. It has a base of support amongst party grassroots, urban liberals, and progressives.

The DAMAI (lit. 'peace') faction (Dari Akar, Membina Aspirasi Inklusif) is led by Nurul Izzah Anwar, co-chairperson of the Secretariat of the Special Advisory Body to the Minister of Finance. It is joined by key party figures such as Amirudin Shari, Ramanan Ramakrishnan, Adam Adli Abd Halim, Fadhlina Sidek and Muhammad Kamil Munim. It represents the party establishment that supports coalition-building and forging closer ties with UMNO. The campaign manifesto pledged to strengthen and focus on the future of the party along with helping the sandwich generation escape the cocoon of poverty. Its support is derived from local leaders, with over 200 of 222 divisions pledging support, along with party veterans and conservatives who wish to emulate PKR into a 'reformed' UMNO.

== Controversies and issues ==
=== Alleged weaknesses in the voting system ===
The leadership election was marred with allegations of weaknesses in the implementation of the online voting system (e-voting). Rafizi Ramli, the party's deputy president, claimed that the results at the divisional level were like "a body without a head", owing to many division leaders opposed to Rafizi winning despite the rest of their 'team' losing. There have been protests by losing candidates to re-examine the results at the divisional level, such as the defeat of Nik Nazmi Nik Ahmad to Afdlin Shauki in Setiawangsa along with Akmal Nasir's defeat to Taufiq Ismail in Johor Bahru. However, the PKR Central Leadership Council (MPP) confirmed and finalized the election results for all 220 branches nationwide on 5 May 2025 after an external audit found no irregularities.

=== Allegations of money politics ===
A video went viral on Twitter showing Ramanan Ramakrishnan, a vice-presidential candidate aligned with DAMAI, handing out money to several people at Sungai Buloh's Pusat Khidmat Rakyat. However, Ramanan denied the accusation that they were bribes to supporters, instead claiming it was an old clip of hand-outs to his staff personnel after the 2023 Selangor state election.

== Timeline ==
Dates	Events
14–16 March 2025	Nominations for Division Committee Members, Division Women Committee Members and Division Youth Committee Members
11–20 April 2025	Elections for Division Committee Members, Division Women Committee Members and Division Youth Committee Members
8–9 May 2025	Nominations for Central Leadership Council (MPP) Members, Central Women Committee Members and Central Youth Committee Members
23 May 2025	Elections for Central Leadership Council (MPP) Members, Central Women Committee Members and Central Youth Committee Members

== Nominations and results ==
=== Central Leadership Council (MPP) ===
==== President ====
Candidate	Members' vote
Anwar Ibrahim	Unopposed

==== Deputy President ====
Candidate	Members' votes
Nurul Izzah Anwar	9,803
Mohd Rafizi Ramli	3,866

==== Vice Presidents ====
Candidate	Members' votes
Amirudin Shari	7,955
Ramanan Ramakrishnan	5,895
Aminuddin Harun	5,889
Chang Lih Kang	5,757
Nik Nazmi Nik Ahmad	5,656
Sim Tze Tzin	5,085
Hee Loy Sian	3,642
Sathia Prakash Nadarajan	2,573
Manivannan Gowindasamy	2,432
Mustaffa Kamil Ayub	2,029
Abun Sui Anyit	1,545
Yuneswaran Ramaraj	1,231

==== Central Leadership Council Members ====
Candidate	Members' votes
Fahmi Fadzil	4,811
Adam Adli Abd Halim	4,798
Chan Ming Kai	4,753
Gunarajah George	4,699
Mohd Azlan Helmi	4,699
Maszlee Malik	4,694
Goh Choon Aik	4,669
Nor Azrina Surip	4,669
Elizabeth Wong Keat Ping	4,668
Abang Zulkifli Abang Engkeh	4,668
Siti Aishah Shaik Ismail	4,655
Syed Ahmad Syed Abdul Rahman Al-Hadad	4,467
Akmal Nasrullah Mohd Nasir	4,455
Amidi Abdul Manan	4,444
Lee Chean Chung	4,416
Nor Azam Karap	4,403
Syed Ibrahim Syed Noh	4,389
Kumaresan Aramugam	4,373
Sim Chon Siang	4,372
Sivamalar Ganapathy	4,366
Romli Ishak	4,266
Mohd Johari Mohamad	4,252
David Cheong Kian Young	4,247
Saifuddin Shafi Muhammad	3,913
Raiyan Abdul Rahim	3,808
Fahmi Zainol	3,707
Mohd Yahya Mat Sahri	3,674
Onn Abu Bakar	3,537
Tan Kar Hing	3,429
Wong Chen	3,333
Abdullah Sani Abdul Hamid	3,274
Chua Wei Kiat	3,246
Sangkar Rasam	3,229
Zahir Hassan	3,217
Thiban Subbramaniam	3,025
Saiful Izham Ramli	3,020
Razeef Rakimin	2,920
Rajendra Kumar Munusamy	2,976
Gerald Hans Isaac	2,904
Najib Bakar	2,812
Roslan Ismail	2,786
M. Anbarasan Murugesu	2,673
Mohd Rafee Ibrahim	2,670
Khairul Anuar Ahmad Zainudin	2,570
Gan Ay Ling	2,533
Mohammad Fahmi Ngah	2,436
Azmizam Zaman Huri	2,349
Kesavan Subramaniam	2,348
Najwan Halimi	2,226
Manolan Mohamad	2,218
Khairil Adanan	2,116
Kenny Chiew Chi Kin	2,072
Mohd Kamri Kamaruddin	1,930
Suhaimi Ibrahim	1,885
Baldip Singh Santokh Singh	1,810
Yew Boon Lye	1,803
Mohd Fakhrulrazi Mohd Mokhtar	1,636
Saraswathy Kandasami	1,624
Borhan Aman Shah	1,609
Mustapa Mansor Amer Mohd Isa	1,606
Asharun Uji	1,523
Anetha Vallaitham Pillal	1,499
Syaril Ali	1,384
Zainurizzaman Moharam	1,464
Anmuniandy Andy Vellymalai	1,438
Isaiah Jacob	1,396
Tay Wei Wei	1,385
Mohd Saifullah Mohd Zulkifli	1,329
Dikin Musah	1,318
Syed Azuan Syed Ahmad	1,238
Abdul Halim Hussain	1,144
Amir Md Ghazali	1,132
Mohd Fauzi Abdullah	1,129
Lim Kim Eng	1,002
Balamurugan Sinnathamby	935
Chan Sai Keong	773
Nareshakumar Sukumaran	762
C. Kamalanathan	746
Amir Hussien	745
Lai Chen Heng	712
Tan Chin Wuu	603
Delakan Ratha Krishnak	508
Yusof Mat	457
Amran Othman	418
Wan Ibnul Bahar Wan Ismail	405
Anthony Soosai Manikam	394
Lim Weng Boon	365
Sulaiman Abu Samah	291

=== Central Women’s Leadership Council (MPWP) ===
==== Women's Chief ====
Candidate	Members' votes
Fadhlina Sidek	2,890
Rodziah Ismail	1,806

==== Deputy Women's Chief ====
Candidate	Members' votes
Juwairiya Zulkifli	2,760
Napsiah Khamis	1,752

==== Vice Women's Chiefs ====
Candidate	Members' votes
Rozana Zainal Abidin	2,610
Loh Ker Chean	2,608
Rufinah Pengeran	2,518
Faizah Ariffin	1,574
Wasanthee Sinnasamy	1,542
Sivamalar Genapathy	994

=== Central Youth Leadership Council (MPAMKP) ===
==== Youth Chief ====
Candidate	Members' votes
Kamil Munim	Unopposed

==== Deputy Youth Chief ====
Candidate	Members' votes
Izuan Kasim	3,339
Arshad Hassni	1,538

==== Vice Youth Chiefs ====
Candidate	Members' votes
Nabil Halimi	2,784
Mohammed Taufiq Johari	2,780
Chiew Choon Man	2,353
Pravin Murali	1,495
Fathin Amelina Fazlie	1,110
Prasanth Kumar Brakasam	974
Goh Kah Yong	774
Prabakaran Parameswaran	541
Kalaimughilan Arjunan	335
Wan Hasifi Amin	261
Shaun Kua	108

=== Division leadership ===
The following is a list of branch leaders, AMK leaders, and women leaders who won the elections.

Parliament	Leader		
Parliament	Branch	AMK division	Women division
Padang Besar	Zainol Samah	Ahmad Azzin Izzad Bahanudin	Roha Hamzah
Kangar	Noor Amin Ahmad	Khalid Imran Mas Ahmad Nasruddin	Salmiza Shaari
Arau	Manivanan Karuppiah	Mohd Ashrad Ahmad Sabki	Mariammah Sandamurthi
Langkawi	Ismail Wasi Ahmad Shafawi	Mohammad Aminuddin Mohd Zamri	Nurul Mirzaniza Che Din
Jerlun	Mohamed Rudzi Samsudin	Muhammad Aliff Hasbullah	Nadzriah Ibrahim
Kubang Pasu	Azizi Azizan	Ahmad Azhan Razif	Marduwati Mazlan @ Mazlani
Padang Terap	Mohd Tahar Hussin	Ahmad Muzakkir Zakaria	Rusna Ismail
Pokok Sena	Mohd Altab P.A. Ibrahim	Mohammad Afiq Hazwan Samsudin	Zurian Ibrahim
Alor Setar	Chan Ming Kai	Chuah Jin Son	Fatimah Zahrah Zamri
Kuala Kedah	Mohamad Shakir Lukman Hakim	Abdul Fatah Al Siddiq Bok	Nor Aishah Osman
Pendang	Halim Khomiza	Khairol Aizat Md Noor	Che Sufian A. Rahman
Jerai	Poobalan Subramaniam	Wan Mohamad Syahezral Wan Shahidan	Zainab Ishak
Sik	Habib Ahmad Muhaiyuddin Habib Dainal	Habib Ahmad Irfan Habib Dainal	Afishah Said
Merbok	Yugins Muthusamy	Mohammad Fitri Ismail	Siti Arteeka Hanes Abdullah
Sungai Petani	Mohammed Taufiq Johari	Mohammad Syamil Luthfi Samsul Bahrin	Rohayu Johari
Baling	Chandar M. Subramaniam	Mohamad Amirul Asraff Ismail	Rohana Hashim
Padang Serai	Shamsul Anuar Abdullah	Sasitaran Balakrishnan	Nanthini Suberamaniam
Kulim-Bandar Baharu	Yeo Keng Chuan	Mohd Zulhusni Zakaria	Kogila Puradan
Tumpat	Mohamad Zamakh Sari Ibrahim	Mazhafar Makhtar	Mazalina Ibrahim
Pengkalan Chepa	Syed Mohd Alidustur Syed Mohd Zain	Asyhraf Wajdi Mohd Nor	Nor Hayati Ismail
Kota Bharu	Abd Hamid Muhammad Abu Samah	Wan Hafriz Wan Mahathir	Zakiah Katib
Pasir Mas	Mohd Izhan Ramli	Wan Abdul Hadi Hakimi Wan Mohd Nawi	Siti Esyah Abdul Razak
Rantau Panjang	Nik Ghazali Nik Md. Amin	Mohamad Ezzat Zahrim Mohd Hanuzi	Rozianti Mat Deris
Kubang Kerian	Rahim Hasan	Muhamad Syazwan Syah Adnan	Khalijah Abdullah
Bachok	Ahamd Nazri Mohd Zain	Muhammad Azuwan Mazelam	Nor Azmiza Mamat
Ketereh	Sukri Hussin	Wan Muhammad Ridhwan Wan Abdul Rahman	Suhaidah Suhaimi
Tanah Merah	Mohamad Suparadi Md Noor	Che Ruhaizad Azraain Che Ruslan	Rohani Abu Hassan
Pasir Puteh	Kamaruddin Mat Zin	Norshafiqah Bekeri	Dayang Suhailla Ibrahim
Machang	Nik Mohamad Anuar Badiruddeen	Muhamad Syafiq Anuar	Rosmaroha Ismail
Jeli	Mohd Rafi Hashim	Nurazi Mohd Arifin	Marliana Abdullah
Kuala Krai	Mohd Shukri Ishak	Ahmad Firdaus Ahmad Razlan	Zaidah Zakaria
Gua Musang	Asharun Uji	Muhammad Airul Shaqim Asharun	Nafisah Ab Wahab
Besut	Che Ku Hashim Che Ku Mat	Norhairiey Che Pauzi	Wan Azizah Wan Abas
Setiu	Aziz Abd Wahab	Nurman Hakim Azmi	Hasiah Ibrahim
Kuala Nerus	Zainudin Awang @ Omar	Muhammad Ihsan Mat Nasir	Noor Sulyantie Che Sulaiman
Kuala Terengganu	Azan Ismail	Fadhlullah Haziq Mohamad Zaini	Mek Sulaini Puteh
Marang		Amira Alias	Ramlah Salleh
Hulu Terengganu	Eka Lisut	Aiman Izuddin Suhaimi	Farah Shahida Ramli
Dungun	Abdul Razak Mohamad	Syafiqah Nabihah Shamsul Bahari	Armila Alias
Kemaman	Ahmad Nazri Mohd Yusof	Mohd Hidayat Mat	Nurul Akhirah Khairani Abd Rahman
Kepala Batas	Zainuddin Mohamed	Uzair Mohamad Fadzli	Hamizah Che Amat
Tasek Gelugor	Mohamad Abdul Hamid	Nurmushawwir Hrsikesa Thaitchana Muruthi	Noor Milah Mohd Saad
Bagan	Lim Eng Nam	Mohammad Hafiz Mohd Rasull	Low Kooi Hiang
Permatang Pauh	Nurul Izzah Anwar	Aiman Syakirin Sazali	Nur Aishah Zainol
Bukit Mertajam	Lee Khai Loon	Abshar Nurasyraf Amram	Hamidah Sulaiman
Batu Kawan	Goh Choon Aik	Ooi Boon Sheng	Oh Peng Jeat
Nibong Tebal	Fadhlina Sidek	Mu'adz Abd Rasyid	Nur Syakila Abdullah
Bukit Bendera	Lee Boon Heng	Ooi Mei Mei	Jayanti Kandayah
Tanjong	Kumaresan Aramugam	Muhamad Shahir Salim	Naffizatulmissria Syed Musthaffa
Jelutong	Johari Kassim	Muhamad Nayim Othuman Mydin	Marina Puteh
Bukit Gelugor	Chan Soon Aun	Muhamad Hafiz Roslan	Chandraprema Johnny Sagadevan
Bayan Baru	Sim Tze Tzin	Muhammad Faris Mohd Firdaus	Rodziah Abul Khassim
Balik Pulau	Mohd Tuah Ismail	Muhammad Fazli Ismail	Nurhidayah Che Ros
Gerik	Ahmad Safwan Mohamad	Arief Imran Mohd Khairi	Nor Bazilah Abu Bakar
Lenggong	Mohamad Tahirudin Pooty	Muhammad Aqil Masshor	Hamidah Mohammed
Larut	Mohd Fairuz Mohd Saari	Adib Mohamad Fazil	Intan Sharina Sharudin
Parit Buntar	Beh Yong Kean	Muhamad Hani Asyraf Khairul Nizam	Farah Amira Zainudin
Bagan Serai	Alphonse Arulandu	Aruljude Alphonse	Robiazita Mat Nayan
Bukit Gantang	Mohd Khairol Iwan Mat Khairi	Mohamad Salehhudin Dollah	Rashimah Mohd Rashid
Taiping	Ahmad Zahid Khalid	Muhammad Izzaz Afzal Zainon Shah	Sarojah V. Raman
Padang Rengas	Muhammad Kamil Abdul Munim	Muhammad Yazid Mohd Abral	Nor Azlina Nordin
Sungai Siput	Novinthen Krishnan	Hairul Akmal Mohd	Shariffah Nur Amiza Syed Ahmad Jalal
Tambun	Shamsul Kamar Ani	Ashraf Kahasani	Mary Susila N. Perumal
Ipoh Timor	Muhamad Fahimuddin Zahidanishah	Muhammad Izzudin Hariz Bohari	Nur Atikah Yuszailee
Ipoh Barat	Tines Arumugam	Muhammad Aslam Johari	Logiswary Subramaniam
Batu Gajah	Tamiiselvan Supramaniam	Saravanan Selvam	Poraniy Ramalingam
Kuala Kangsar	Mohamad Hairul Amir Sabri	Zaim Sidqi Zulkifly	Kurniawati Sahibad
Beruas	Cheng Mao Hong	Mohammad Syafiq Ramli	Fauziah Jaffar
Parit	Shahrul Annuar Ahmad	Syahnas Putera Mohd Yaacob	Zilawati Aizura Usaili
Kampar	Baldip Singh Santokh Singh	Aidy Azril Azmi Murat	Salamah Baharie
Gopeng	Tan Kar Hing	Ahmad Nazrin Shah Abd Rahman	Zuraidah Zakaria
Tapah	Mohd Noorazam Shah Ahmad Afandi	Muhammad Norazlizam Azrin Yusri	Prasanna Devi Kunjamboo
Pasir Salak	Hisamuddin Ali	Muhamad Haras Hasnawi Mohd Nasir	Ruzita Sabri
Lumut	Abdul Razak Nazri	Muhammad Taufiq Abdul Mutalib	Sozita Abdul Jalil
Bagan Datuk	Manukaran Ramalu	Moogan Rao Muserlaya	M. Bavani Mayakrishnan
Teluk Intan	Muzaffar Shah Khairuddin @ Suhaimi	Hasnul Farid Khairuddin	Fauziah Ismail
Tanjong Malim	Chang Lih Kang	Muhammad Haziq Azfar Ishak	Mairoszalifah Ismail
Cameron Highlands	Ismail Mohd Hussin	Amirul Syafiq Badrul Shah	Wan Noreliza Wan Nor Ahmad
Lipis	Mohd Hasim Mansor	Badrul Hakimi Mohd Supian	Shahrullina Ishak
Raub	Sivanandar Genapathy	Baskaran Muniandy	Junaida Mohamed @ Ab Hamid
Jerantut	Hassan Basri Awang Mat Dahan	Muhammad Hafami Jaafar	Narru'l Akma Kamaruddin
Indera Mahkota	Ahmad Farhan Fauzi	Ahmad Saifullah Razali	Farahida Fauzi
Kuantan	Fakhrul Anuar Zulkawi	Mohd Hilmy Yakap	Sridayu Samsuri
Paya Besar	Wan Fauzuldin Wan Samad	Muhammad Hurairah Roslan	Haslindalina Hashim
Pekan	Mohamad Yazid Che Mat	Muhammad Zubair Tugimon	Rohana Mohd
Maran	Sia Wei Lung	Muhammad Khairu Lnizam Halias	Mazni Ali
Kuala Krau	Mohamad Hafez Harun	Nafsiah Kadir	Nafsah Kadir
Temerloh	Mohd Amran Jalaluddin	Zafiz Akmal Zah Hamri	Siti Zaleha Osman
Bentong	Jeffry Nizam	Mohd Fadhil Hanafi Mohd Nor Sidik	Kamariah Yusuf
Bera	Manolan Mohamad	Norafiza Ahmad Zaidi	Masdora Marlan
Rompin	Abdul Rahim Sulaiman	Mohd Alif Haziq Kamarul Zaman	Nor Zakiah Mohamad Ata
Sabak Bernam	Ahmad Mustain Othman	Nazrin Nawawi	Torsinah Wagiman
Sungai Besar	Azhar Achil	Jeegisthiswaran Kuppan	Noorafiqah Muliyani
Hulu Selangor	Sathia Prakash Nadarajan	Muhammad Ghafurullah Ismail	Wong Sheau Mei @ Ong Sheau Mei
Tanjong Karang	Mohd Yahya Mat Sahri	Muhammad Asyraf Syafiq Anuar	Nor Faizah Ismail
Kuala Selangor	Sivabalan Mugunthan	Murvinthen S. Mohan	Zainun Muskam
Selayang	Chua Wei Kiat	Tamilarasu Thamil Kalai	Salasiah Disa
Gombak	Amirudin Shari	Abdul Haris Harahap Khairudin	Ruhanah Masruki
Ampang	Syed Ahmad Syed Abdul Rahman Al-Hadad	Muhammad Iman Haziq Mohammad Hamizi	Siti Fatimah Jusoh
Pandan	Rafizi Ramli	Mohd Ifwat Amir Hamirudin	Roasiah Ramli
Hulu Langat	Rajendra Kumar Munusamy	Muhammad Azmuddin Mohamed	Siti Razimi A Razak
Bangi	Lim Kim Eng	Mathiventhar Mahendran	Elliza Aliza Md Arith
Puchong	Zaihasri Jaafar	Ahmad Umar Khair Zainuddin	Yusni Mat Yusof
Subang	Pravin Murali	Ruben Pogwan Singh	Gunasunthari Kanniappan
Petaling Jaya	Hee Loy Sian	Muhammad Nabil Halimi	Maisarah Ismail
Damansara	Elizabeth Wong Keat Ping	Christopher Ong Kean Li	Lam Yoke Saw
Sungai Buloh	Ramanan Ramakrishnan	Bariqul Zaman Batharul Zaman	Sarimah Lisut
Shah Alam	Mohd Najwan Halimi	Muhammad Izuan Ahmad Kasim	Nur Yusmi Md Yusop
Kapar	Azizi Ayob	Tan Seng Wei	Muthumariammah N Suppaeya
Klang	Azmizam Zaman Huri	Mohamad Shahrul Adnan	Nor Mala Jantan
Kota Raja	Gunarajah George	Muhammad Afif Abdullah	Hasheena Begum Osanarau
Kuala Langat	Mohd Afiq Mohd Tuniman	Rifhan Rahimi Mahmud	P. Umanathini Gnanapragasam
Sepang	Borhan Aman Shah	Mohamad Khuzairy Kamaruddin	Rukiyah Kolamchery
Kepong	Neo Wong	Sassi Shritaran	Siti Saidatul Azween Ismail
Batu	Asheeq Ali Sethi Alivi	Mohamad Iqbal Farok	Rosmahwati Sahanim Hasim
Wangsa Maju	Lai Chen Heng	Arief Izuadin Ahmad Jefferi	Falora Ambi
Segambut	Vignesvaran Gunasagaran	Chong Ren Jye	Zainab Nayan
Setiawangsa	Afdlin Shauki Aksan	Mohammad Rais Hamdan	Rozana Ramli
Titiwangsa	Syed Badli Shah Syed Osman	Fathin Amelina Fazlie	Adilina Ahmad
Bukit Bintang	Anwar Pawan Chik	Mohamad Firzan Hakimi Zulpakar	Saira Banu
Lembah Pantai	Ahmad Fahmi Mohamed Fadzil	Noor Amelia Zainabila Zaiffri	Jamilah Awang
Seputeh	Thiyagaraj Sankaranarayanan	Alexandre Ong Wai Kwong	Syamala K. Muniandy
Cheras	Mohamad Raimi Ab. Rahim	Amir Zulhair Abdull Khalid	Yap Kuay Hua
Bandar Tun Razak	Azman Abidin	Wan Nur Aishah Ahmad Fazli	Mazlina Osman
Putrajaya	Muhammad Fikri Khalid @ Abdul Aziz	Mohamad Syafiq Anwar Mohd Saidi	Fasyarini Azahari
Jelebu	Zainal Fikri Abd Kadir	Mohammad Haqqim Nazaruddin	Siti Aisyah Jaafar
Jempol	Manivannan Gowindasamy	Muhammad Zahin Zinal Abidin	Nor Shahida Ayub
Seremban	Noor Iskandar Mohamad Noor	Raihan Md Idris	Tengku Zamrah Tengku Sulaiman
Kuala Pilah	Ismail Muhamad Nor	Shaliashaziq Mohd Sahar	Norliza Mohamed Thani
Rasah	Ahmad Izzuddin Ismail	Muhammad Aqil Irfan Razali	Telagapathi A. Marimuthu
Rembau	Jufitri Joha	Mohamad Hamizan Mohd Bahtiar	Rohanita Abu Bakar
Port Dickson	Aminuddin Harun	Badrusshisham Adnan	Aishah Rani Suresh Chand
Tampin	Raja Veerappan	Muhammad Farid Mohamad	Maszurah Kamat
Masjid Tanah	Halim Bachik	Muhammad Khairi Aliman	Nurnazlina Mohd Puat
Alor Gajah	Mohd Khuzaire Mohd Kamal Kannan	Sivabalan Karunakaran	Rosita Ramli
Tangga Batu	Azlan Osman	Farzana Hayani Mohd Nasir	Suriati Harum
Hang Tuah Jaya	Shamsul Iskandar Mohd Akin	Muhamad Hakimi Mokhtar	Elizah Asuan Kailani
Kota Melaka	Md Yusoff Ahmad	Lee Yen Wei	Zubaidah Ali
Jasin	Jagatheason Ramiah	Thivagar Vajan	Esma Eazreen Husin
Segamat	Shamala Vasudevan	Raven Boy Francis Sales	Mahaletchumi Soornarayanan
Sekijang	Pang See Keong	Muhamad Hami Rifa'ie Ramli	Siti Norlila Abdullah
Labis	Ravi Sankar Al Yallamalai	Mohd Farhan Zulkefly Balan	Serrdevi Naraianan
Pagoh	Subramani Chami	Sharwin Subramani	Zuraidah Wagi
Ledang	Syed Ibrahim Syed Noh	Mohamad Ghazali Mohamed	Norlaila A Jalil
Bakri	Md Ysahrudin Kusni	Mohammad Hafizzatul Farham Mohd Azha	Lim Siew Shyuan
Muar	Roselin Nona	Muhamad Amirrul Shahfiq	Noormah Hassan
Parit Sulong	Hishamuddin @ Misrin Ishak	Shahrul Azuan Samat	Ruzilawati Idris
Ayer Hitam	Rosman Tahir		Masliah Ahmad Shah
Sri Gading	Abdul Saad Salleh	Muhammad Faris Akmal Fathun Nizam	Noor Fatin Syahirah Razman
Batu Pahat	Onn Abu Bakar	Muhammad Nor Aiman Mansor	Anita Ahmad
Simpang Renggam	Maszlee Malik	Navinraj Krishnan	Faridah Jaini
Kluang	Kalytas Chandrahasan	Amirul Hafiz Abd. Hamid	Ten Ben Siang
Sembrong	Mohd Shahrun Radzi Salehudin	Norliza Hashim	Hami Astafi Ab Halim
Mersing	Khairil Adanan	Omar Mokhtar A Manap	Noor Fatimah Yusoff
Tenggara	Mohd Fakhruddin Muslim	Ain Nur Shaddiq Zabidie	Nursyahzan Maizal
Kota Tinggi	Ibrahim Mohd Nor		
Pengerang	Faizul Abdul Ghani		
Tebrau	Prakash Maniam	Lee En Xiang	Anushia Balan
Pasir Gudang	Murad Jailani	Suria Vengadesh Kerisnan	Noraziah Mohd Razit
Johor Bahru	Mohamad Taufiq Ismail	Ahmad Ihsan Mohd Arif	Siti Nor Aishah Suratnu
Pulai	Faezuddin Puad	Faezuddin Puad	Loh Siew Wei
Iskandar Puteri	Shamala Devi Rajah	Logesan Ramasamy	Sakunthla Naranasamy
Kulai	Arthur Chiong Sen Sern	Tamili Gopalakrishnan	Nurul Farah Jayus
Pontian	Haniff @ Ghazali Hosman	Ambok Ahmad Jufri Yusupah	Nadiah Rosli
Tanjung Piai	Mohd Sayfaul Ariffin Abdul Karim		Marlianah Ismail
Labuan	Simsudin Sidek	Haziq Ruslain	Noriha Yakup
Kudat	Stefly Said	Mohamad Nasip A. Rahim	Camelia Jaikop
Kota Marudu	Zaidi Jatil	Mohd Hisyam Ali Hasan	Linda Eborok
Kota Belud	Mustapha @ Mohd Yunus Sakmud	Jeffole Jait	Alice Taisin
Tuaran	Mohammad Razeef Rakimin	Arief Hambali J Indan	Artini Ali Taugan
Sepanggar	Peto Galim	Rafe'e Jafree	Prisila Molison
Kota Kinabalu	Lee Li Mei	Christopher Lee Yun Lin	Lee Mee Peng
Putatan	Awang Husaini Sahari	Mohd Rizzal Manap	Kisni @ Debbie Suimin
Penampang	Chang Ket Hoi @ Joseph Alex Chang	Eldridge Laurence Timis	Maria Durasim
Papar	Roslee Malek	Abdul Rijam Tirio	Dg Nooraidah Panji
Kimanis	Niki Mohan Singh @ Mohana Singh Ramday	Mohd Alfendy Ambros	Siti Mariam Ag Nuddin
Beaufort	Dikin Musah	Abdul Malik Abdul Ghani	Agnes Ebos
Sipitang	Wendey Agong Baruh	Ian Brian Francis	Junaidah Makku
Ranau	Apirin Jahalan @ Taufik Sham	Helmi Mohamad Ann Hamilin	Rusnin @ Rosenin Lontom
Keningau	Sangkar Rasam	Mohd Gusdhur Sangkar	Juliah Malintau
Tenom	Herbert Roger	Aljakalil Biou	Norsiah Yakub
Pensiangan	Rufinah Pengeran	Mohd Guntur Sangkar	Rufinah Pengeran
Beluran	Basran Omar	Harlan Omar	Nuralya Elta Yunus
Libaran	Abdul Said Pimping	Jumasiah Lasama	Bungaria Ringan
Batu Sapi	Aris Remigius @ Haris Remigius	Mohammad Fazly Awang Massali	Suzanah Awang Massali
Sandakan	Sahrudin A Harol	Mohamad Zulfadhil Junid	Nerissa Barredo
Kinabatangan	Azmi Datu Tamboyong	Mohd Kuzaimih Mahalil	Siti Jaharah Untang
Lahad Datu	Romansa Laimin	Muhammad Firdaus Charlie	Noor Zeeta Tamsun
Semporna	Mohd Amin Abdul Mem	Mohd Ghazali Sabardin	Rozaliah Mokhtar
Tawau	Fung Thin Yein	Vincent Fung Sze Zack	Syria Managolla
Kalabakan	Albani Najawi	Yusof Khalil	Noraini Abd Ghapur
Mas Gading	Jani Unggu		Zailly Nor Liza Ab Shukor
Santubong	Ahmad Nazib Johari	Alzan Norita	Salina Junaidi
Petra Jaya	Nur Jafni Abdullah	Dayang Siti Aisah Abg Mos	Nomaida Mustapha
Bandar Kuching	Dominique Ng Kim Ho	Lim Keh Shen	Berrylin Ng Phuay Lee
Stampin	Chow Ah Hong	Nicholas Lim Yong Juin	Kulan Anyi
Kota Samarahan	Nazirol Sama'ail	Muhammad Aliff Aizat Aziz	Jeliha Deris
Puncak Borneo	Chee Phin Khoo	Luke Ethan Arts Chelsnie Adantemapur	Victoria Musa
Serian	Senior William Rade	Ardillas Wellington	Ayes Nyanong
Batang Sadong	Bahrudin Shah Ibrahim	Mohd. Faridzuan Abdul Jalil	Uji Rasit
Batang Lupar	Abg Zulkifli Abg Engkeh	Wan Danish Haikal Wan Ahmad	Norsuzailatul' Akmar Md Desa
Sri Aman	Eddi @ Eddie Banyan		Rachel Jali
Lubok Antu	Tet Tugang		Ibar Merjang
Betong	Patrick Kamis	Mohd Hafiz Qhaikal Angat	Hapsah Harun
Saratok	Ibil Jaya		Lily Angga Meling
Tanjong Manis	Adris Subeli		
Igan	Jamaludin Ibrahim		Mariam Ibrahim
Sarikei	Yee Chin Kui	Jeffry Empenie	Mary Suntang
Julau			
Kanowit	Mohd Fauzi Abdullah @ Joseph Nyambong	Stephanie Vivany James	Betty Kadam
Lanang	Michael Lee Meng Ting	Dennis Wong Sien Kai	Anatasia Marcus
Sibu	Mohammad Fadzli Jawawi	Nur Ashiqin Zainal	Magdaline Munai Bansa
Mukah	Mohd Arwin Lim Abdullah		Lina Munang
Selangau	James Jalai Gayau		
Kapit	Khusyairi Pangkas Abdullah	Archelous Tugang	Runda Engkamat
Hulu Rajang	Abun Sui Anyit	Jonathan Stanley Bennet	Ungan Lisut
Bintulu	Norisham Mohamed Ali	Jason John	Rebecca Beka Bana
Sibuti	Louis Jampi	Nur Adila Johri	Julita Silus
Miri	Chiew Choon Man	Christopher Jemat Amie	Ngo Ling Hua
Baram	Roland Engan		
Limbang	Racha Balang		Patricia George Jack
Lawas	Muhd Zahid Matserudin	Siti Nurfatin Hamama Bujang	Norazwani Abdul Samad

- Results as of 1/5/2025 (Names underlined above mean he/she won uncontested.)
