= 2022 People's Justice Party leadership election =

Election in a political party in Malaysia

2022 People's Justice Party presidential election
- 11 April – 17 July 2022
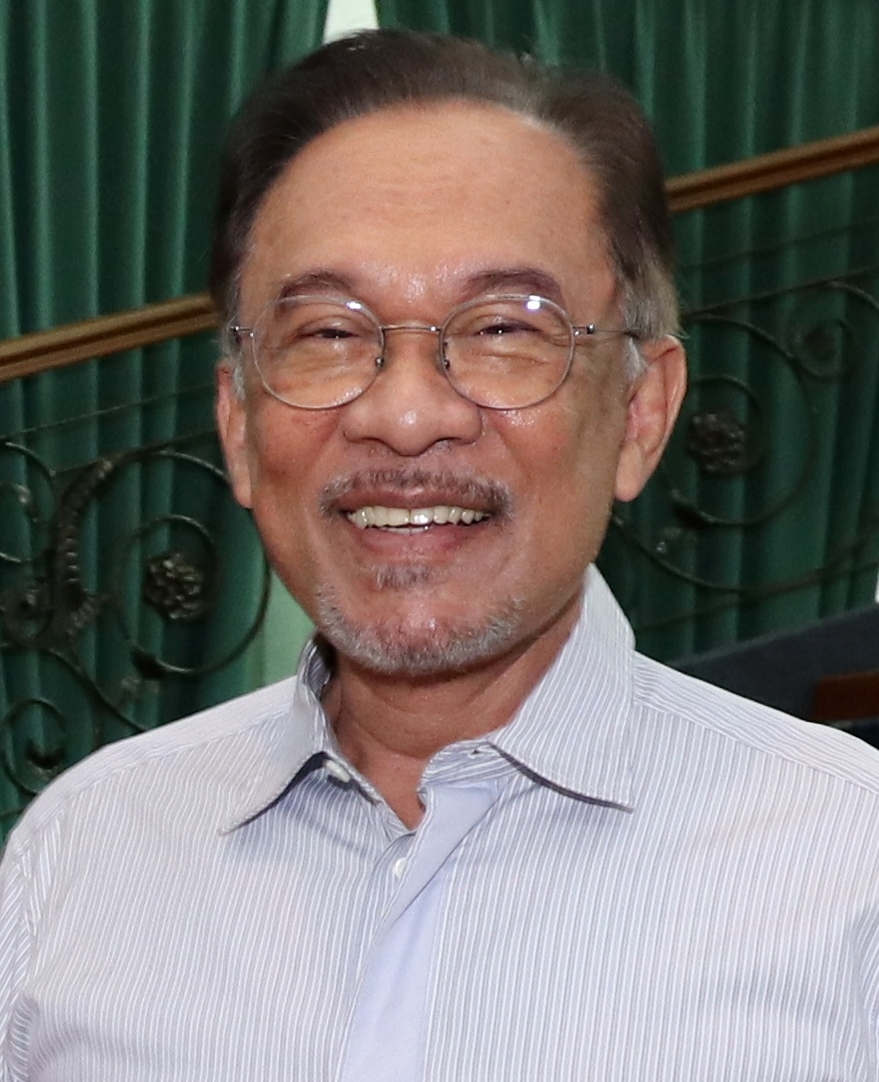
Candidate	Anwar Ibrahim
Popular vote	Unopposed
President before election
Anwar Ibrahim
Elected President
Anwar Ibrahim

2022 People's Justice Party deputy presidential election
- 11 April – 17 July 2022
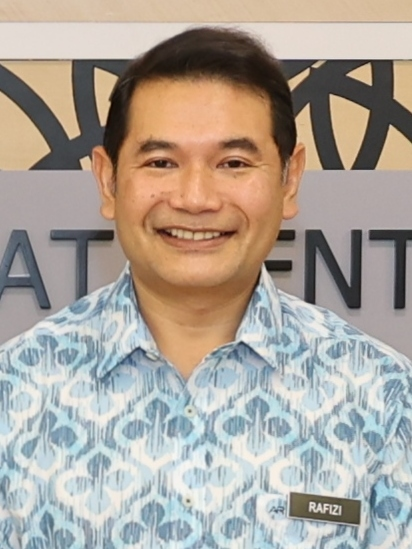

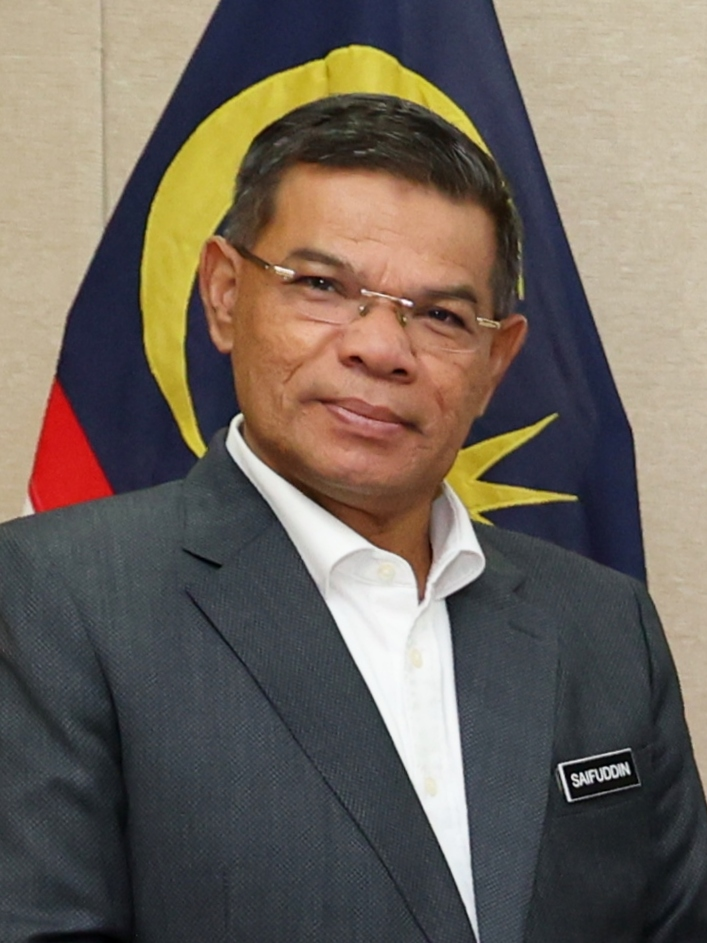
Candidate	Mohd Rafizi Ramli	Saifuddin Nasution Ismail
Popular vote	59,678	43,010
Percentage	58.12%	41.88%
Deputy President before election
Mohd Rafizi Ramli
Elected Deputy President
Mohd Rafizi Ramli

A leadership election was held by the People's Justice Party (PKR) in Malaysia from April to July 2022 to elect new leadership on the central level.

== Events ==
For the party presidency, it was highly unlikely for incumbent president Anwar Ibrahim to face any potential opponents and being defeated and he would hence remain as the party president given to his prominent and dominant position in the party and politics following the departure of former deputy president Azmin Ali, his followers and a number of founding members aligned to Azmin whom they were embroiled in splits and fallouts with Anwar and eventually resulted in the 2020–2022 Malaysian political crisis which overthrew the democratically elected Pakatan Harapan (PH) administration. The 2018 PKR election was repeated with Anwar remaining as the party president after he was elected by walkover as he was the sole candidate for the party presidency in the election.

For the party deputy presidency, it was expected to see a heated contest and fight between Rafizi Ramli, former candidate and loser to Azmin in 2018 and the incumbent vice-president, who announced his return to active politics on 15 March 2022, and Saifuddin Nasution Ismail, also a former candidate and loser to Azmin in 2014, the loyalist to Anwar and the incumbent secretary-general. Subsequently, on 29 May 2022, Rafizi defeated Saifuddin with an unexpected landslide victory in the unofficial results revealed. Saifuddin then conceded defeat and congratulated Rafizi on winning the PKR deputy presidency at night on the same day. On 4 July 2022, the results of the forensic audit of the unofficial results were revealed with a major change of the overturn of the victory in the contest for the position of Women Chief with initial winner Rodziah Ismail being edged out extremely narrowly by her opponent Fadhlina Sidek by a majority of mere 32 votes. Fadhlina was then declared the new Women Chief-elect. The rest of the results remained almost the same as the initial ones and no other major changes took place. The audit was done following complaints and allegations of the lack of freedom, fairness and transparency by some of the candidates.

== Timeline ==
Dates	Events
11 April 2022	Nominations opened
13 April 2022	List of initial candidates revealed
14–15 April 2022	Declines of nominations
16 April 2022	Results of declines revealed
17–19 April 2022	Appeals for results
20 April 2022	List of final candidates revealed
21 April 2022	Deadline for virtual voters to update their mobile applications of voting
13–22 May 2022	Physical voting
17 May 2022	Virtual voting for overseas members
18–20 May 2022	Virtual voting
29 May 2022	Unofficial results revealed
4 July 2022	Results of the forensic audit of the unofficial results revealed
15 July 2022	Youth National Congress
16 July 2022	Women National Congress
17 July 2022	Central National Congress and official results revealed

== Nominations and results ==
=== Central Leadership Council (MPP) ===
==== President ====
Candidate	Members' votes
Anwar Ibrahim	Unopposed

==== Deputy President ====
Candidate	Members' votes
Mohd Rafizi Ramli	59,678 (58.12%)
Saifuddin Nasution Ismail	43,010 (41.88%)

==== Vice Presidents ====
Candidate	Members' votes
Amirudin Shari	46,075
Chang Lih Kang	34,939
Nik Nazmi Nik Ahmad	34,496
Aminuddin Harun	33,230
Manivannan Gowindasamy	29,117
Farhash Wafa Salvador	27,015
Fahmi Fadzil	24,351
Fuziah Salleh	22,534
Chan Ming Kai	22,344
Abdullah Sani Abdul Hamid	20,761
Gunarajah George	20,164
Shamsul Iskandar Mohd Akin	16,269
Thiban Subbramaniam	15,155
M. A. Tinagaran	11,086
Azan Ismail	5,699
Mustaffa Kamil Ayub	5,620
Summugam Rengasamy	5,313

==== Central Leadership Council Members ====
Candidate	Members' votes
Maszlee Malik	1,091
Akmal Nasrullah Mohd Nasir	956
Romli Ishak	878
Fahmi Zainol	817
Yahya Sahri	804
Nor Azrina Surip	797
Lee Chean Chung	788
Siti Aishah Shaik Ismail	783
Syed Ibrahim Syed Noh	739
Gerald Hans Isaac	720
Simon Ooi Tze Min	703
Wong Chen	697
Raiyan Abdul Rahim	697
Tan Kar Hing	648
Zahir Hassan	642
David Cheong Kian Young	622
Hee Loy Sian	619
Amidi Abdul Manan	617
Elizabeth Wong Keat Ping	598
Muhammad Bakhtiar Wan Chik	594
Muhamad Arafat Varisai Mahamad	588
Ginie Lim Siew Lin	580
Halim Bachik	576
Johari Abdul	558
Faizah Ariffin	555
Che Zam Hamzah	549
Abdul Halim Hussain	539
June Leow Hsiad Hui	530
Sivarasa Rasiah	526
Kesavan Subramaniam	515
Madhi Hasan	506
Rusnah Aluai	495
Awang Husaini Sahari	492
M. Anbarasan Murugesu	469
Azmizam Zaman Huri	455
Loh Ker Chean	444
Gooi Hsiao Leung	434
Zaidi Ahmad	432
Jimmy Puah Wee Tse	428
Abang Zulkifli Abang Engkeh	410
Maria Chin Abdullah	409
Mustapa Mansor Amer Mohd Isa	396
Mohd Amin Abdul Mem	388
Mohd Najwan Halimi	387
Afdlin Shauki Aksan	343
Zinda Khalil Sastro Hassan	339
Zamri Yusuf	330
Baldip Singh Santokh Singh	314
Gopalakrishnan Subramaniam	300
Gunarajah George	292
Shatiri Mansor	282
Yaakob Sapari	277
Ravi Munusamy	263
Adzman Kamaruddin	263
Zulkifly Mohamad	262
Mohd Aizuddin Ariffin	261
Mohd Zukri Aksah	251
Tan Chin Wuu	238
Zaidi Yusoff	229
Nor Irwan Ahmat Nor	207
Halim Khomiza	207
Abdul Razak Ismail	202
Karupaiya Mutusami	191
Maneyvannan Velue	140
Arastam Pandorog	131
Zulqarnian Zakariah	91
Ong Khan Lee	73
Tee Choon Keong	61
Mohd Zawawi Ahmad Mughi (withdrew)	35
Mohd Rafee Ibrahim (withdrew)	22
Mohd Fakhrulrazi Mohd Mokhtar (withdrew)	18
Mustapha @ Mohd Yunus Sakmud (withdrew)	16
Disqualified	6

=== Central Women’s Leadership Council (MPWP) ===
==== Women's Chief ====
Candidate	Members' votes
Fadhlina Sidek	18,923
Rodziah Ismail	18,891

==== Deputy Women's Chief ====
Candidate	Members' votes
Juwairiya Zulkifli	15,693
Napsiah Khamis Maharan	12,043
Faizah Ariffin	9,763

==== Vice Women's Chiefs ====
Candidate	Members' votes
Wasanthee Sinnasamy	14,947
June Leow Hsiad Hui	13,358
Sangetha Jayakumar	13,350
Loh Ker Chern	12,942
Siti Aishah Shaik Ismail	12,273
Junaidah Makku	11,931
Sabrina Ahmad	9,080
Shamala Vasudevan	8,050
Rufinah Pengeran	5,307
Hasmorni Tamby	4,614

=== Central Youth Leadership Council (MPAMKP) ===
==== Youth Chief ====
Candidate	Members' votes
Adam Adli Abd Halim	12,301
Fahmi Zainol	9,850

==== Deputy Youth Chief ====
Candidate	Members' votes
Kamil Abdul Munim	11,526
Chua Wei Kiat	10,389

==== Vice Youth Chiefs ====
Candidate	Members' votes
Atyrah Hanim Razali	10,898
Pravin Murali	10,398
Prasanth Kumar Brakasam	10,330
Izuan Kasim	10,291
Ahmad Danish Hairudin	10,081
Wendey Agong Baruh	7,936
