= Rafizi Ramli =

Malaysian politician

Yang Berbahagia Dato' Seri Mohd Rafizi Ramli SSNS
- رافضي رملي
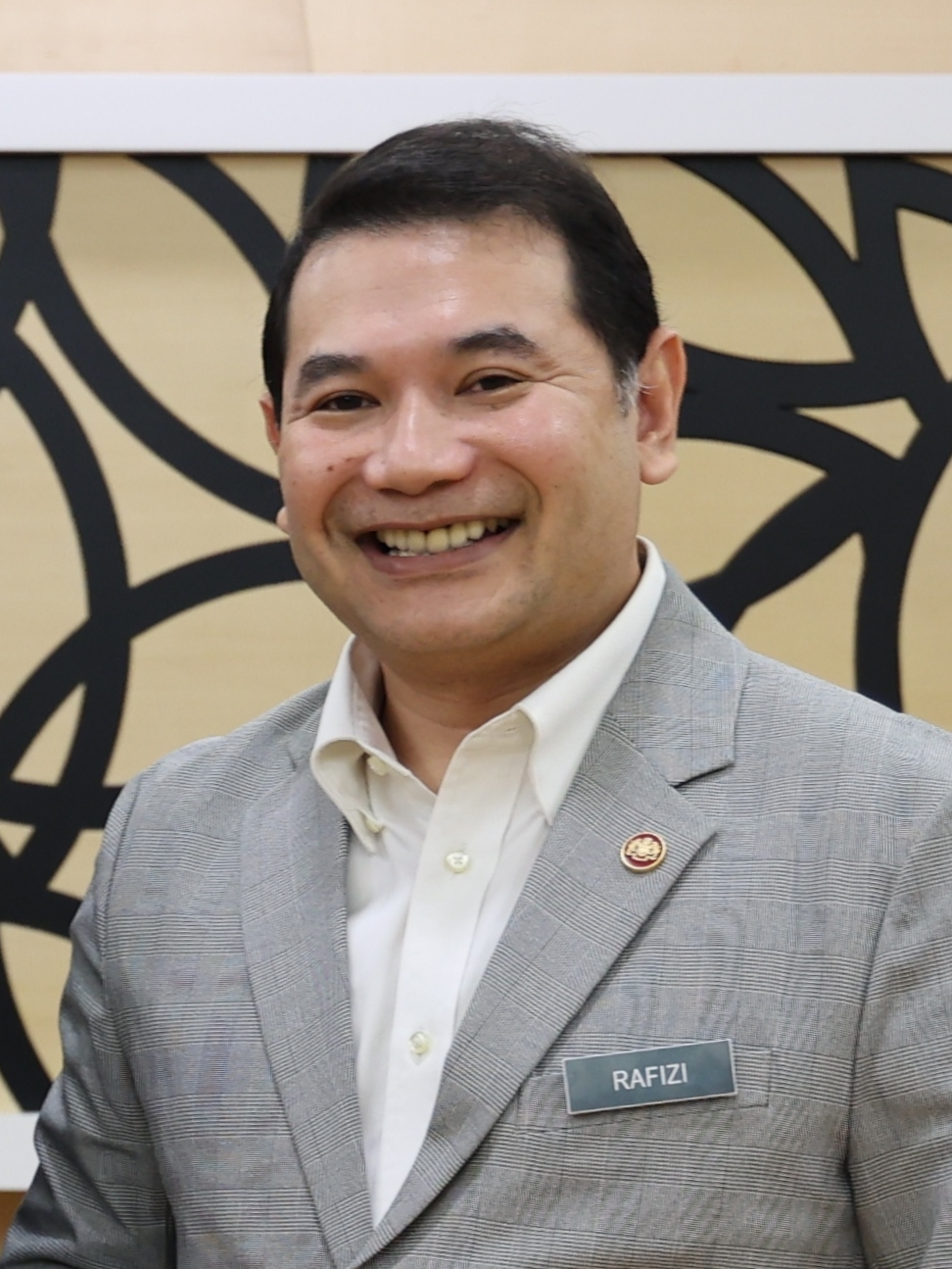
- Rafizi in 2023

Minister of Economy
- In office 3 December 2022 – 17 June 2025
- Monarchs: Abdullah (2022–2024); Ibrahim (2024–2025)
- Prime Minister: Anwar Ibrahim
- Deputy: Hanifah Hajar Taib
- Preceded by: Mustapa Mohamed
- Succeeded by: Amir Hamzah Azizan (acting); Akmal Nasir
- Constituency: Pandan

Member of the Malaysian Parliament for Pandan
- In office 19 November 2022 – 18 May 2026
- Preceded by: Wan Azizah Wan Ismail (PH–PKR)
- Majority: 48,296 (2022)
- In office 5 May 2013 – 9 May 2018
- Preceded by: Ong Tee Keat (BN–MCA)
- Succeeded by: Wan Azizah Wan Ismail (PH–PKR)
- Majority: 26,729 (2013)
Party leadership roles
5th Deputy President of the People's Justice Party
In office 17 July 2022 – 23 May 2025
President	Anwar Ibrahim
Preceded by	Azmin Ali
Succeeded by	Nurul Izzah Anwar
Vice President of the People's Justice Party
In office 20 August 2014 – 17 July 2022 Serving with: Shamsul Iskandar Md Akin (2014–18); Nurul Izzah Anwar (2014–18); Chua Tian Chang (2014–22); Zuraida Kamaruddin (2018–20); Xavier Jayakumar Arulanandam (2018–21); Chang Lih Kang (2018–22); Michael Teo Yu Keng (2020–22)
President	Wan Azizah Wan Ismail (2014–2018); Anwar Ibrahim (2018)
Secretary-General of the People's Justice Party
In office 13 October 2014 – 25 November 2016
President	Wan Azizah Wan Ismail
Preceded by	Saifuddin Nasution Ismail
Succeeded by	Saifuddin Nasution Ismail
Strategic Director of the People's Justice Party
In office 18 December 2010 – 13 October 2014
President	Wan Azizah Wan Ismail
Preceded by	Chua Tian Chang
Succeeded by	Sim Tze Tzin

Personal details
- Born: Mohd Rafizi bin Ramli; 14 September 1977 (age 49) Besut, Terengganu, Malaysia
- Party: BERSAMA (since 2026); PKR (2003–2026); KeADILan (1998–2003)
- Other political affiliations: Pakatan Harapan (2015–2026); Pakatan Rakyat (2008–2015); Barisan Alternatif (1999–2004)
- Spouse: Afizsa Ashak (m. 2011)
- Children: 1
- Education: University of Leeds (BEng)
- Occupation: Politician; chartered accountant
- Website: rafiziramli.com
- Rafizi Ramli on Facebook

Mohd Rafizi bin Ramli (Jawi: محمد رافضي بن رملي; born 14 September 1977) is a Malaysian politician who served as the Minister of Economy from 2022 until his resignation in 2025. A member of the Malaysian United Party, he served as Member of Parliament (MP) for Pandan from 2013 to 2018 and from 2022 to 2026.

Born in Terengganu, he received his tertiary education at the University of Leeds and later became a chartered accountant. He served as the fifth deputy president of People's Justice Party from 2022 until his defeat in a leadership election in 2025. He was also a vice-president of the party from 2014 to 2022, secretary-general from 2014 to 2016, and strategic director from 2010 to 2014.

He is also the founder of the whistleblower organisation National Oversight and Whistleblowers Centre (NOW) and of INVOKE, a crowd-funded campaign organisation and data firm.

== Early life and education ==
Rafizi was born in Besut, Terengganu and was raised in Kemaman, an east-coast town. He came from a humble background; his father was a rubber tapper. During his schooling days, he was active in extra-curricular activities where he represented Malay College Kuala Kangsar (MCKK) in debate championships as well as being a top student. After finishing his secondary education, he was awarded a scholarship to study Electrical Engineering at the University of Leeds. He attended Malay College Kuala Kangsar from 1990 to 1994 and studied at Leeds from 1996 to 1999.

Rafizi has been active in politics since his university days. When Anwar Ibrahim was sacked as the Deputy Prime Minister of Malaysia in 1998, he became more involved in politics and joined the Reformasi movement. He dedicates his involvement in politics to a close friend, Adlan.

== Early career ==
After graduating from college, Rafizi worked for the accounting firm Jeffreys Henry Chartered Accountants in London (1999–2003) and, at the same time, studied for professional papers and qualified as a chartered accountant under the Institute of Chartered Accountants in England and Wales (ICAEW) in 2003, the year he also joined the Malaysian Institute of Accountants. Upon returning to Malaysia in 2003, Rafizi worked for the Malaysian oil company, Petronas from 2003 to 2009. At MTBE Malaysia Sdn Bhd (2003–2005) he managed the propane dehydrogenation plant and was promoted to senior manager for business planning, operations and petrochemical trading technology; at Petronas Carigali (2007–2009) he was senior manager for accounting, budgeting and international taxation. In 2009, he became the General Manager of the healthcare company Pharmaniaga, before being appointed as the Chief Executive of the Selangor Economic Advisory Office, a position he held until July 2012.

== Political career (1998–present) ==
Rafizi was elected to Parliament in the 2013 general election. PKR selected him to contest the seat of Pandan, which was held by former Malaysian Chinese Association (MCA) president Ong Tee Keat. Ong was dropped for the election by Barisan Nasional, though he remained popular among voters. The decision to do so was exploited by Rafizi, who repeatedly praised Ong on the campaign trail. Rafizi won the seat by a margin of 26,729 votes, more than twice the number received by the MCA candidate.

Rafizi did not contest the 2018 general election as his eligibility to stand as a candidate was put in doubt due to his pending appeal against a 30-month jail sentence for leaking banking details belonging to the National Feedlot Corporation (NFC) and its chairman. The Pandan seat was instead contested and won by the then-President of PKR Wan Azizah Wan Ismail.

=== In opposition ===
Rafizi was a staunch critic of Barisan Nasional (BN) governments and repeatedly exposed cases of corruption and mismanagement.

On 8 November 2011, he disclosed on his blog irregularities at the National Feedlot Corporation (NFC), involving the family of Shahrizat Abdul Jalil, then Minister of Women, Family and Community Development. Shahrizat and her family were accused of misusing RM250 million in public funds meant for a state cattle ranch in Gemas, Negeri Sembilan. The Malaysian Anti-Corruption Commission (MACC) cleared her of involvement in the case. On 19 January 2012, Shahrizat sued Rafizi and Zuraida Kamaruddin, then head of PKR's women's wing, for defamation in the Kuala Lumpur High Court, claiming RM50 million in general damages and RM50 million in aggravated and exemplary damages.

He also revealed instances of over-priced closed tender projects and purchasing of overpriced assets. His revelations also included Khalid Ibrahim's out of court settlement with Bank Islam concerning a RM66.67 million loan to purchase shares in Guthrie Group Limited when Khalid was its chief executive officer. The revelation, which marred Khalid Ibrahim's image, constituted a part of the Kajang Move.

Rafizi advocated lower petrol prices. He criticised the government's move in 2014 to end petrol subsidies, arguing that it would benefit oil companies and petrol station owners but not the Malaysian people. He had prominently threatened to lead a street protest on New Year's Eve if the government did not lower oil prices, following the fall of oil prices worldwide. He also advocated for changes to the way petrol prices are fixed by the government, to protect petrol station owners from the deleterious impacts of fluctuating prices. His defense of petrol station owners elicited some criticism from netizens and Utusan Malaysia.

In April 2013, Rafizi said that Najib Razak and Rosmah Mansor would be jailed if Anwar Ibrahim became prime minister.

==== Kajang Move ====
Rafizi was a close confidant and adviser of PKR leader Anwar Ibrahim. In 2014, Rafizi engineered the failed Kajang Move, which sought to oust Khalid Ibrahim, a PKR member, as Menteri Besar of Selangor and install Anwar as his replacement. The move encountered a number of obstacles; it ultimately succeeded in forcing Khalid's resignation, but Azmin Ali, PKR's then-Deputy President, replaced him instead.

In October 2014, after the Kajang Move reached its conclusion, Rafizi was appointed as Secretary-General of PKR, replacing Saifuddin Nasution Ismail as the leading administrative officer of the party. Rafizi's appointment came two months after his election as one of the party's four vice presidents. The party's constitution permitted him to hold both his appointed and elected positions. In 2026 Rafizi said on his podcast that the Kajang Move began over what he described as an integrity question about Khalid's RM70 million settlement with Bank Islam, and not over making Anwar Menteri Besar, and that the story later changed to one of replacing Khalid with Anwar.

==== Return to active politics ====
After being defeated in the 2018 People's Justice Party leadership election by Azmin Ali for the position of deputy president, Rafizi temporarily stepped away from politics. He announced his return in March 2022, as well as his intention to run in the 2022 party elections for the deputy presidency, in which he defeated Saifuddin Nasution Ismail.

He returned to parliament in the 15th general election, representing Pandan. He managed to win the seat with a landslide 48,000 vote majority. He was subsequently appointed as the Minister of Economy in the Anwar Ibrahim Cabinet.

=== Minister of Economy (2023–2025) ===
==== Progressive wage ====
The ministry launched a progressive wage policy in 2024 with a pilot program targeting 1,000 employers. Inspired by Singapore, the policy is intended to address the issue of stagnant wages and productivity. As part of the policy, the government pays participating companies incentives; RM200 for entry-level jobs and RM300 for non-entry level jobs in wage subsidies, applicable for workers earning between the minimum wage and RM5,000 monthly. Only micro, small, and medium enterprises are eligible to participate.

Concerns have been raised as to the viability of the policy, as unlike in Singapore, there is no delineation of which sectors it applies to. The geographic disparity and accompanying differences in costs of living have also been cited as a possible issue, as has the lack of representation from industry and trade unions in the policy's oversight and implementation.

In 2025, the ministry reported that the median wage of entry-level workers employed by participating companies had risen from RM1,950 to RM2,200, and RM2,200 to RM2,400 for non-entry level workers. A total of 756 employers had applied to be part of the policy. The government announced the same year that it would earmark RM200 million for the policy's expansion with the goal of covering 50,000 workers.

==== Poverty elimination ====
As the minister of economy, Rafizi launched a number of programmes, including the People's Income Initiative (IPR) in 2023, intended to raise the household income of 100,000 participants to RM2,000 per month as well as to address the high-cost of food, manpower shortages in certain sectors, and agricultural insecurity.

The IPR itself is split into three programmes; food, agriculture, and service. The Food Entrepreneur Initiative (Insan) involved participants selling packaged food in IPR-branded vending machines, with prices capped at a ceiling of RM5. Participants were required to front the capital for their products while the government covered rental and electricity. The Agro Entrepreneur Initiative (Intan) opened government-owned land for crop farming, while the Services Operator Initiative (Ikhsan) appointed participants to clean and maintained government-owned facilities such as offices and public toilets.

By 2024, the government had opened up 445 hectares of land for the Agro Entrepeneur Initiative, and statistics provided by the Ministry of Economy in 2026 showed that 65% of participants had reached the RM2,000 monthly income target, with RM22 million in revenue generated, while 76% of participants in the Food Entrepreneur Initiative also recorded RM2,000 in sales or more. However, the IPR programme as a whole recorded only 6,781 household participation as of 2026. Concerns have also been raised about food safety with the Food Entrepreneur Initiative, particularly cross-contamination and unsafe storage.

==== Semiconductor industry ====
The economy ministry was involved in negotiations for a $250 million agreement with British semiconductor designer Arm Holdings to allow the transfer of intellectual property and manufacture of chips in Malaysia. The deal was announced in March 2025 as part of the country's plans to become a chip manufacturing hub.

==== Resignation from government ====
Following his defeat in the 2025 People's Justice Party leadership election to Nurul Izzah Anwar, he announced his resignation as Minister of Economy, stating that he no longer possessed the party's mandate. He also cited the completion of the Thirteenth Malaysia Plan as marking the fulfilment of his minsterial responsibility. Rafizi was joined Nik Nazmi Nik Ahmad, the Minister for Natural Resources and Environmental Sustainability, who lost his vice-presidency in the party. His resignation took effect on 17 June 2025, with Rafizi taking leave in the intervening period.

=== Post-ministerial career (since 2025) ===
Following his resignation, Rafizi began a weekly podcast, Yang Berhenti Menteri (YBM), in June 2025, stating that he was no longer bound by government ethics and confiedentiality. He previously hosted a podcast with the same acronym, Yang Bakar Menteri.

==== Departure from PKR and founding BERSAMA ====
In February 2026, PKR issued Rafizi a show-cause letter after he said that he would defend his parliamentary seat at the next general election, but not under the PKR ticket. In March 2026, PKR took no action beyond reminding him to follow the party's rules.

On 17 May 2026, Rafizi and Nik Nazmi Nik Ahmad announced that they would leave PKR, vacate their Pandan and Setiawangsa seats, and take over Parti Bersama Malaysia (BERSAMA). They said they would contest their former seats for the party at the next general election. In the 2026 Johor state election on 11 July 2026, all 15 BERSAMA candidates lost their deposits. In August 2026, Rafizi said the party aimed for up to 15 per cent of the vote in the 2026 Malacca state election, for which polling was set for 14 November 2026.

== Whistleblowing and legal issues ==
=== NFC disclosure and bank-secrecy case ===
Rafizi was charged in August 2012 under Banking and Financial Institutions Act (Bafia) 1989 for revealing four Public Bank customer-profile documents on the balance summaries of the National Feedlot Corporation, National Meat and Livestock Sdn Bhd, Agroscience Industries Sdn Bhd and NFC Chairman, Mohamad Salleh Ismail in his pursuit of exposing the NFC scandal.

Rafizi was alleged to have disclosed the documents to media consultant Yusuf Abdul Alim and The Star reporter Erle Martin Carvalho, at PKR headquarters in Petaling Jaya on 7 March 2012. Bank clerk Johari Mohamad, 44, was also accused of conspiring with Rafizi. His effort to strike out the charges was rejected by High Court on 23 November 2012, by the Appeals Court on 23 May 2013 and finally, by Federal Court on 6 April 2015. His trial was set to begin on 27 April 2015. On 7 February 2018, Rafizi was sentenced by a Sessions Court in Shah Alam to 30 months in jail for exposing confidential banking details.

On 15 November 2019, the High Court overturned the conviction over technical reasons and Rafizi was discharged. The judge, Mohd Yazid Mustafa, ruled that exhibit P4 and attachments A to D were photocopied documents that did not meet the requirements of Section 65(1)(c) of the Evidence Act 1950 and were therefore inadmissible. Bank clerk Johari Mohamad was also discharged and acquitted of the same charge.

=== Tabung Haji ===
On 8 April 2016, Rafizi pleaded not guilty to the charge of publishing a libellous statement against Tabung Haji through the posting of an article with the heading Analisa Kewangan Tabung Haji 2009-2015 (An Analysis of the Finances of Tabung Haji 2019-2015) in his blog. He was acquitted by the Kuala Lumpur Magistrate's Court on 27 February 2019.

In July 2026, the government made public the report of the Royal Commission of Inquiry into Tabung Haji, which examined the fund's management from 2014 to 2020. The report found that, had the Malaysian Financial Reporting Standards been applied in full, the fund would have recorded a net loss of RM1.4 billion for 2017, instead of the RM3.4 billion profit in its 2017 financial report.

=== FELDA ===
Between 2012 to 2017, Rafizi published blog posts on investments by the Federal Land Development Authority (FELDA) and its subsidiaries, including a housing financing agreement in 2016. In October 2017, he said FELDA had overpaid between RM108 million and RM180 million for the Grand Plaza Serviced Apartments in London. The FELDA Investment Corporation (FIC) considered legal action against him over his claim about who owned a London hotel, and a deputy minister rejected his claims.

On 10 April 2019 the government tabled a White Paper on FELDA in the Dewan Rakyat. It appended a forensic review of eight FELDA and FIC purchases by Ernst & Young that found governance failures and weak internal controls, that the 37 per cent stake in Eagle High Plantations bought for US$505.4 million in December 2016 cost 95.86 per cent more than its market price, and that FIC had approved the purchase of the Park City Grand Plaza Kensington hotel in London for £60 million although the sale agreement on record was for £46 million. The government agreed to provide RM6.23 billion in aid. On 2 September 2026 the MACC said it had reopened seven FELDA-related cases on new leads.

=== 1MDB audit report and the Official Secrets Act ===
On 23 August 2017, the Malaysian High Court in Kuala Lumpur upheld an 18-month jail sentence against Rafizi for being in possession of page 98 of the 1MDB audit report without approval, in violation of the Official Secrets Act 1972. The conviction and 18-month jail sentence had prevented Rafizi from contesting in the 2018 Malaysian general election. On 1 June 2018, after the election, Rafizi was released on a good behaviour bond of RM10,000 bound over for two years in one surety over the OSA conviction by the Court of Appeal.

=== Defamation suits ===
In April 2015, Prime Minister Najib Razak and his wife Rosmah Mansor filed a defamation suit against Rafizi over his remarks made regarding the latter's supposed purchase of diamond rings and its relation to the rise of fuel prices. Rafizi would later defend himself saying that the statement was made jokingly and that it contained nothing defamatory. The couple would later retract the suit following the explanation.

In October 2025, businessman Farhash Wafa Salvador, a former political secretary to Anwar, filed a defamation suit against Rafizi seeking RM10 million in general damages over videos that Rafizi posted in July and August 2025. On 23 October 2026, Farhash filed a second defamation suit seeking RM10 million over remarks in an episode of Rafizi's podcast published on 16 October.

On 21 February 2026, Rafizi announced that he would begin a defamation suit against social media influencer Ariz Ramli, known as Caprice, who had alleged that Rafizi had an interest in a company linked to a RM2.5 billion contract. The contract was a RM2.5 billion investment by UEM Lestra in Segamat under the National Energy Transition Roadmap. Rafizi denied awarding it to a company linked to him, saying that it was a private-sector investment involving no public funds or government procurement; Caprice responded with a denial that he had accused Rafizi of involvement in corruption. On 26 February, Caprice filed his own defamation suit against Rafizi in the High Court, seeking RM10 million in special damages over four videos that Rafizi posted in reply to the allegations. The court ordered Rafizi to file his defence by 9 April 2026. In August 2026, Rafizi said that his suit against Caprice had been filed earlier and was before the court, and called it an exception to his usual practice of not suing over criticism.

On 22 October 2026, after Rafizi had repeatedly challenged human resources minister Ramanan Ramakrishnan to take legal action over claims linked to the "corporate mafia" allegations, Ramanan called Rafizi "a serial liar" and said he would not sue because it would burden the public. The next day Rafizi said he had instructed his lawyers to begin defamation proceedings against Ramanan.

=== Arm Holdings corruption investigation ===
On 16 February 2026, the Malaysian Anti-Corruption Commission (MACC) opened an investigation into the Arm Holdings agreement under Section 23 of the Malaysian Anti-Corruption Commission Act 2009 (using an office or position for gratification), following complaints by three unnamed non-governmental organisations. Rafizi was called in for questioning. On 6 May 2026, Azam said the MACC would propose charges against two individuals, whom he did not name.

== Personal life ==
Rafizi married Afizsa Ashak on 8 October 2011 and they have a son. He is a supporter of Liverpool F.C. On 13 August 2025, his 12-year-old son was jabbed with a syringe at a shopping centre in Putrajaya. Anwar condemned the attack and called for a transparent and speedy investigation. In August 2026, Rafizi said the investigation had stalled.

== Election results ==
Parliament of Malaysia
Year	Constituency	Candidate	Votes	Pct	Opponent(s)	Votes	Pct	Ballots cast	Majority	Turnout
2013	P100 Pandan	Mohd Rafizi Ramli (PKR)	48,183	66.87%	Lim Chin Yee (MCA)	21,454	29.78%	73,228	26,729	87.32%
2022	P100 Pandan	Mohd Rafizi Ramli (PKR)	74,002	63.98%	Muhammad Farique Zubir Albakri (PAS)	25,706	22.23%	115,656	48,296	78.31%
2022	P100 Pandan	Mohd Rafizi Ramli (PKR)	74,002	63.98%	Leong Kok Wee (MCA)	11,664	10.09%	115,656	48,296	78.31%
2022	P100 Pandan	Mohd Rafizi Ramli (PKR)	74,002	63.98%	Ong Tee Keat (WARISAN)	3,323	2.87%	115,656	48,296	78.31%
2022	P100 Pandan	Mohd Rafizi Ramli (PKR)	74,002	63.98%	Nadia Hanafiah (PEJUANG)	961	0.83%	115,656	48,296	78.31%

== Honours ==
=== Honours of Malaysia ===
- Malaysia
  - Recipient of the 17th Yang di-Pertuan Agong Installation Medal (2024)
- Negeri Sembilan
  - Knight Grand Companion of the Order of Loyalty to Negeri Sembilan (SSNS) – Dato' Seri (2025)

== Publications ==
- Reformasi 2.0: Fakta Kes Anwar Ibrahim (2014)
- With Eric Lee: Panduan Bina Semula Negara (CPI Research, 2017), volume 1 of a planned three-volume series; English edition A Guide to Rebuilding Our Nation.
