= Halim Bachik =

Malaysian politician

Yang Berbahagia Datuk Halim Bachik DMSM

State Election Director of Malacca of the People's Justice Party
- Incumbent
- Assumed office 2022
- State Chairman: Aminuddin Harun (2022–2024); Mohd Rafee Ibrahim (2024–present)
- Preceded by: Gue Teck

State Chairman of Malacca of the People's Justice Party
- In office 2018–2021
- President: Anwar Ibrahim
- Preceded by: Shamsul Iskandar Md Akin
- Succeeded by: Aminuddin Harun

Branch Chief of Masjid Tanah of the People's Justice Party
- Incumbent
- Assumed office 2022
- President: Anwar Ibrahim
- State Chairman: Aminuddin Harun

Personal details
- Born: 12 January 1969 (age 57) Kampung Ramuan China Kecil, Masjid Tanah, Malacca, Malaysia
- Party: People's Justice Party (PKR)
- Other political affiliations: Pakatan Harapan (PH)
- Children: 4
- Education: Universiti Putra Malaysia (UPM) (Master's Degree in Veterinary Science)
- Occupation: Politician

Halim bin Bachik is a Malaysian politician who is the candidate for Ayer Limau in May 2013 and Tanjung Bidara in May 2018. He is a member and Branch Chief of Masjid Tanah of the People's Justice Party (PKR), a component party of Pakatan Harapan (PH) coalitions.

== Political career ==
In May 2013, Halim Bachik made his electoral debut after being nominated by PR to contest the Ayer Limau seat. He was defeat by Amiruddin Yusop from Barisan Nasional with the majority of 4,569 votes. In May 2018, Halim Bachik nominated by PH to contest the Tanjung Bidara seat. He was defeat by Md Rawi Mahmud from Barisan Nasional with the majority of 2,864 votes on a three corner fight.

In 2022 party election, he was elected as member of Central Leadership Council of PKR and Masjid Tanah PKR Branch Chief. In 2025 party election, he was fail elected as member of Central Leadership Council of PKR, but he reelected as Masjid Tanah PKR Branch Chief.

== Election results ==
Malacca State Legislative Assembly
Year	Constituency	Candidate	Votes	Pct	Opponent(s)	Votes	Pct	Ballots cast	Majority	Turnout
2013	N03 Ayer Limau	Halim Bachik (PKR)	1,983	36.95%	Amiruddin Yusop (UMNO)	6,552	63.05%	8,702	4,569	86.70%
2018	N02 Tanjung Bidara	Halim Bachik (PKR)	2,001	23.91%	Md Rawi Mahmud (UMNO)	4,865	58.15%	8,521	2,864	84.43%
2018	N02 Tanjung Bidara	Halim Bachik (PKR)	2,001	23.91%	Imran Abdul Rahman (PAS)	1,501	17.94%	8,521	2,864	84.43%

== Honours ==
- Malacca :
  - Companion Class I of the Exalted Order of Malacca (DMSM) – Datuk (2019)
