= Invoke Malaysia =

Malaysian non-profit organization

INVOKE Malaysia
- Formation: September 1, 2016; 10 years ago
- Founder: Rafizi Ramli
- Type: Non-profit organization
- Purpose: Political campaign, statistics
- Headquarters: Sungai Besi, Kuala Lumpur
- Location: Malaysia
- Methods: Volunteerism Valour Virtue
- Volunteers: 30,000 Volunteers
- Website: www.invokeisdata.com

Invoke Malaysia is a Malaysian Non profit organisation founded by People's Justice Party (PKR)'s former Deputy President, Rafizi Ramli in 2016, Invoke is currently headquartered at Sungai Besi. It has 82 staff in 15 offices throughout the country, consisting of 71 full-time and 11 part-time employees. There are over 30 call center staff, who consist of the bigger majority, as well as statisticians, software developers, content developers, campaign strategists, fundraisers, and field campaign coordinators among others for elections in Malaysia. They had managed the political campaign of 50 candidates in the last 2018 general election (GE14).

Invoke Malaysia is assisted occasionally by Andrew Caster, an analytics officer from former US President Barack Obama's 2012 reelection campaign. Invoke strives to become the first professionally run public campaign organisation in South East Asia.

Initially, Invoke drew its funding from Rafizi Ramli's personal seed investment. Currently, its operations are funded through public contributions. Using electoral roll data as well as phone polls, Invoke surveys voters on everything from basic details such as age, residential postcode, gender, race and religion, to political leanings, stand on current issues and whether their votes are transferable between opposition parties. This is done in line with the creation of a “microtargeting” strategy and identify swing voters with a 40 to 60 per cent likelihood of voting for them, amid Pakatan Harapan (PH)'s plan to contest the GE14 in 2018 under a common logo and coalition name. Additionally, Invoke manages a recruitment drive for Polling Agents and Counting agents to support the 50 candidates it manages, on top of 10,000 registered volunteers to conduct canvassing (link), phone polls and data entry across Malaysia.
