= Lai Chen Heng =

Malaysian politician

Yang Berusaha Tuan Lai Chen Heng AMW
- 黎正兴
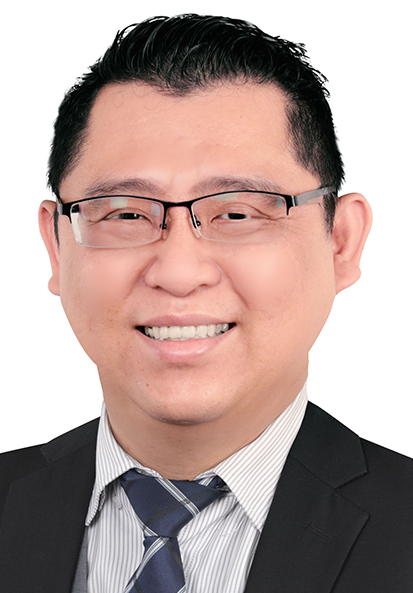

Member of the City Advisory Board of Dewan Bandaraya Kuala Lumpur
- Incumbent
- Assumed office 2023
- Mayor: Kamarulzaman Mat Salleh

State Vice Chairman of the People's Justice Party of Federal Territories
- Incumbent
- Assumed office 2018
- President: Anwar Ibrahim

Branch Chief of the People's Justice Party of Wangsa Maju
- Incumbent
- Assumed office 2018

Deputy Chairman of the Board of Visitors of Cheras Rehabilitation Hospital
- Incumbent
- Assumed office 2025

Committee Member of the State Liaison Committee of Malaysian Crime Prevention Foundation (Kuala Lumpur)
- Incumbent
- Assumed office 2023

Personal details
- Born: 21 August 1980 (age 45) Kuala Lumpur, Malaysia
- Party: People's Justice Party (PKR)
- Other political affiliations: Pakatan Harapan (PH)
- Height: 183 cm (6 ft 0 in)
- Spouse: Poh Siaw Lee
- Website: andrelai.com

Lai Chen Heng (born 21 August 1980) is a Malaysian politician. He serves as a member of the City Advisory Board of Dewan Bandaraya Kuala Lumpur. At the same time, he was also appointed as the deputy chairman of the Board of Visitors of the Cheras Rehabilitation Hospital and member of the State Liaison Committee of Malaysia Crime Prevention Foundation (Kuala Lumpur). He is a member, state vice chairman of Federal Territories and branch chief of the Wangsa Maju of People's Justice Party, a component party of Pakatan Harapan (PH).

== Early life ==
Lai was born on 21 August 1980 and grew up in Ampang, Selangor. He is the youngest of four siblings.

== Education ==
He received his basic education in Ampang; through SK Ampang Campuran and SMK Taman Kosas. After SPM, he obtained a Diploma Certificate in Computer Engineering from Informatics and an Advanced Diploma in Computer Science from FTMS De Monfront University between 1998 and 2001.

== Political career ==
The 2018 party election saw Lai Chen Heng elected the Wangsa Maju PKR branch chief when he contested and won the position of branch chief with a comfortable majority over former member of Parliament Tan Kee Kwong. He was immediately appointed to the Federal Territory State Leadership Council as the state vice chairman of the PKR of Federal Territories. He was reelected in the 2022 party election as state vice chairman of the PKR of Federal Territories and Wangsa Maju PKR branch chief. Lai Chen Heng was reelected as Wangsa Maju PKR branch chief in 2025. He also announced his candidacy for member of PKR Central Leadership Council.

== Honours ==
- Federal Territory (Malaysia) :
  - Member of the Order of the Territorial Crown (AMW) (2020)

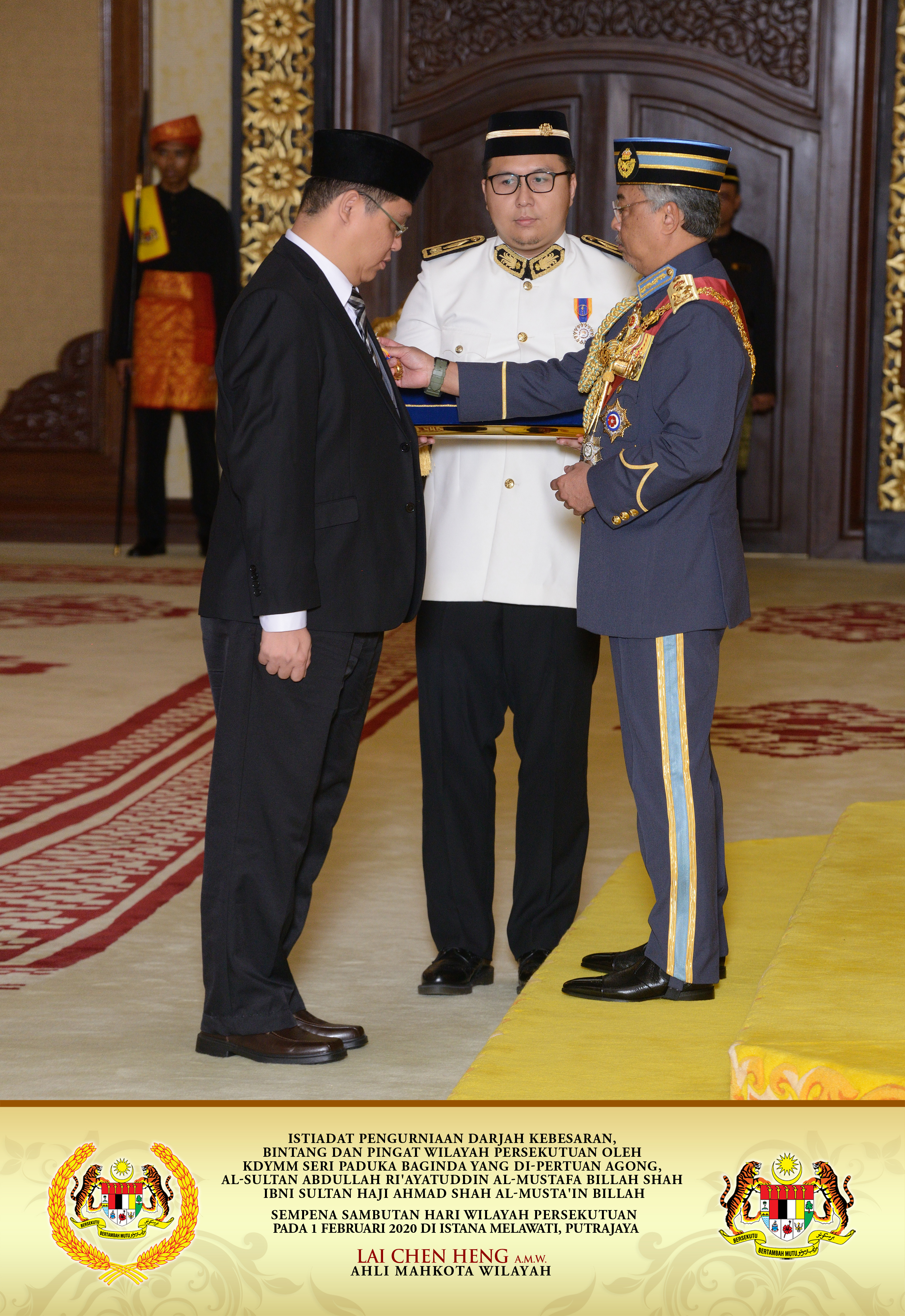
Lai Chen Heng received the Member of the Order of the Territorial Crown in 2020
