= 2018 People's Justice Party leadership election =

Election in a political party in Malaysia

2018 People's Justice Party presidential election
- 22 September – 11 November 2018
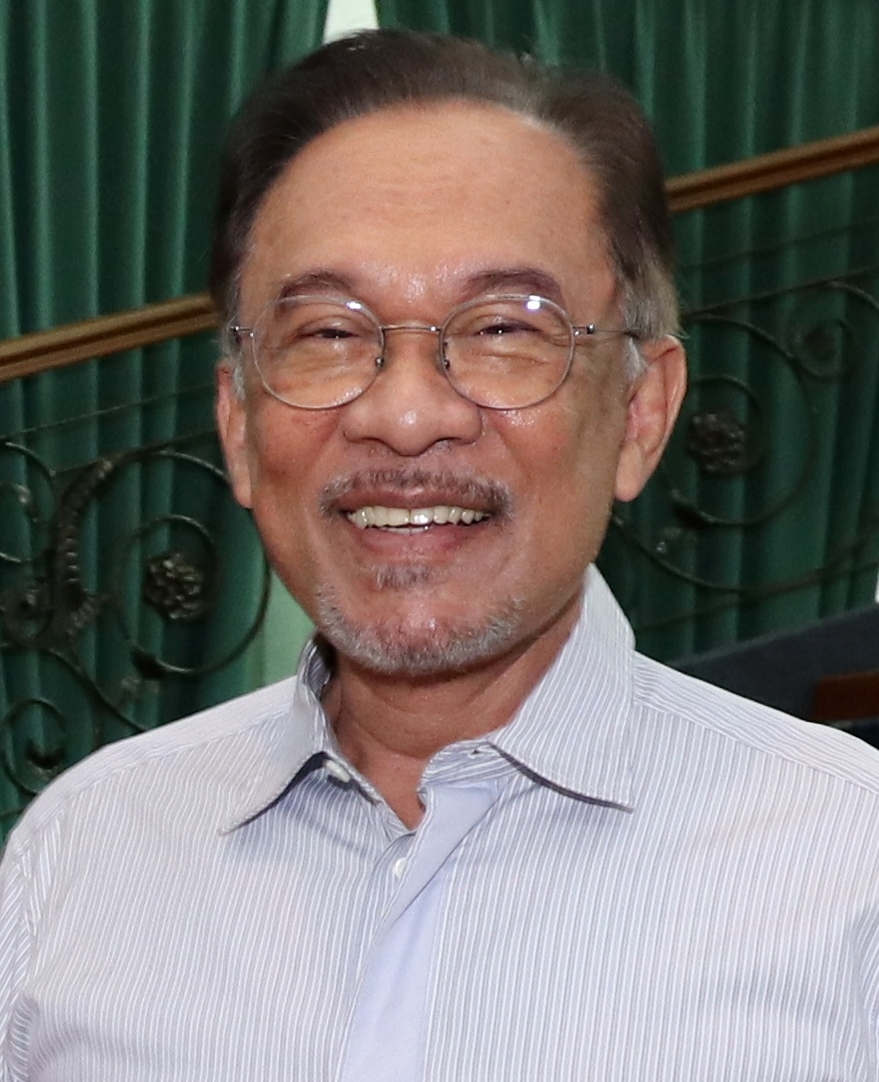
Candidate	Anwar Ibrahim
Popular vote	Unopposed
President before election
Wan Azizah Wan Ismail
Elected President
Anwar Ibrahim

2018 People's Justice Party deputy presidential election
- 22 September – 11 November 2018
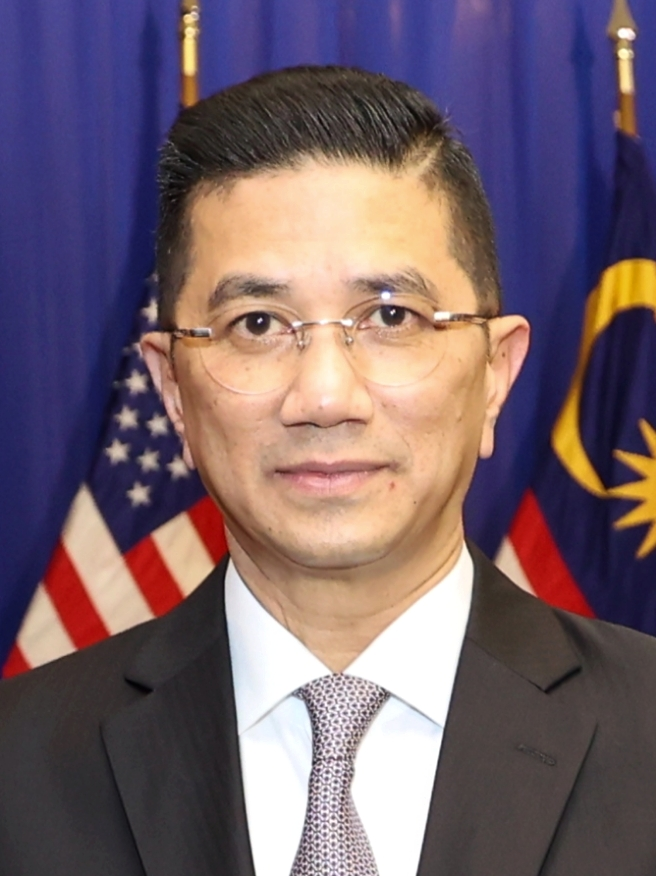

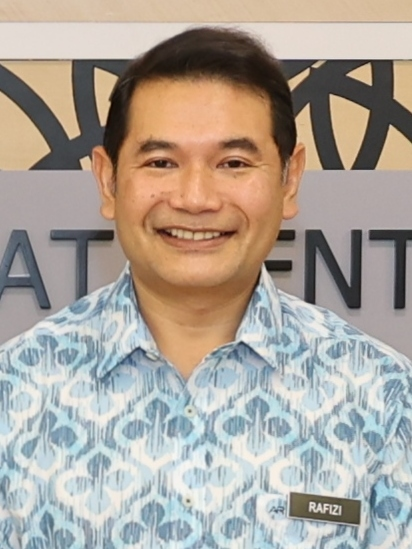
Candidate	Mohamed Azmin Ali	Mohd Rafizi Ramli
Popular vote	71,635	68,730
Percentage	51.03%	48.96%
Deputy President before election
Mohamed Azmin Ali
Elected Deputy President
Mohamed Azmin Ali

A leadership election was held by the People's Justice Party (PKR) in Malaysia in 2018 to elect a new leader.

Anwar Ibrahim, who had been recently pardoned and released from his prison sentence following that year's general elections, was elected as party president uncontested, replacing his wife Wan Azizah Wan Ismail. The post for the deputy president was contested between Rafizi Ramli and Azmin Ali, and with candidates running under the two respective camps. Azmin was elected as deputy president in a tightly contested competition with Rafizi. However, the election was marred by controversy, with allegations of violence and sabotage during the party's polling.

== Nominations and results ==
=== Central Leadership Council (MPP) ===
==== President ====
Candidate	Members' votes
Anwar Ibrahim	Unopposed

==== Deputy President ====
Candidate	Members' votes
Mohamed Azmin Ali	71,635 (51.03%)
Mohd Rafizi Ramli	68,730 (48.96%)

==== Vice Presidents ====
Candidate	Members' votes (max. 4)
Nurul Izzah Anwar	82,343
Zuraida Kamaruddin	64,144
Xavier Jayakumar	59,471
Chua Tian Chang	53,616
Shamsul Iskandar Mohd Akin	52,556
Johari Abdul	49,247
William Leong Jee Keen	46,975
Kesavan Subramaniam	45,234
Vasantha Kumar	16,406
Azan Ismail	10,782
G. Balasubramaniam	8,929
Micheal Tamil	6,715

==== Central Leadership Council Members ====
Candidate	Members' votes (max. 20)
Amirudin Shari	62,467
Mohd Rashid Hasnon	59,325
Abdullah Sani Abdul Hamid	53,683
Rahimah Majid	53,101
Sivarasa Rasiah	52,700
Elizabeth Wong	49,890
Saifuddin Abdullah	48,839
Zakaria Abdul Hamid	48,202
Larry Sng Wei Shien	48,035
Mohd Radzlan Jalaludin	47,880
Nik Nazmi Nik Ahmad	46,521
Mansor Othman	46,115
Kamarudin Jaffar	45,131
Nor Azrina Surip	43,610
Azmizam Zaman Huri	43,458
Zaliha Mustafa	41,770
Edmund Santhara	41,528
Hee Loy Sian	41,514
Gan Pei Nei	41,461
Abdul Halim Hussain	40,721
Lee Khai Loon	40,316
Lee Chean Chung	40,168
Manivannan Gowindasamy	39,956
Aminuddin Harun	39,278
Raymond Ahuar	37,470
Streram Sinnasamy	37,120
Ali Biju	36,956
Idris Ahmad	36,388
Syed Ibrahim Syed Noh	36,007
C David Selvam	34,638
Wong Chen	34,430
Azman Nasrudin	34,355
Summugam Rengasamy	34,345
Khalid Jaafar	34,211
Yew Boon Lye	33,813
Mohamad Imran Abdul Hamid	31,370
June Leow Hsiad Hui	30,307
Amin Abdul Mem	29,654
P. Ganapathy	29,137
Sivamalar Genapathy	28,986
Azman Abidin	23,286
Fazly Faizal Mohamed Razally	22,377
Fariz Musa	20,038
Mustaffa Kamil Ayub	19,980
Mikhael Iskhandaar	19,312
V. Maneyvannan	18,846
Lee Chin Cheh	17,033
Mohd Khuzzan Abu Bakar	16,848
Syarul Ema Rena Abu Samah	15,900
V. Thirukumar	15,880
Voon Shiak Ni	14,523
Mohd Nor Ibrahim	14,029
Muhamad Arafat Varisai Mahamad	13,514
Mohd Firdaus Mohd Sobri	12,788
Gunarajah George	12,253
Ganeson Awarajoo	11,951
Fahmi Fadzil	11,491
Mohd Yahya Mat Sahri	10,865
Gopalakrishnan Subramaniam	10,728
Azizi Ayob	10,629
Roslan Ismail	10,568
Mohamed Siddik Mohamed Ibrahim	10,037
Isaiah Jacob	9,501
Norlela Ariffin	9,451
Ravi Munusamy	9,438
Gunasekaran Kuppan	9,179
Willie Mongin	9,133
L. Segaran	9,018
Farhash Wafa Salvador	8,994
Abul Jais Ashfaq Ahmed	7,843
Zamri Yusuf	7,809
Chai Tong Chai	7,765
Awang Husaini Sahari	7,586
Awang Tangah Awang Amin	7,399
Muthuppalaniappan Muthuraman	7,337
Ali Dad Fazal Elahi	7,310
Lim Lai Seng	7,163
Abd Rahman Yusof	7,105
Asri Buang	6,893
Jayathas Sirkunavelu	6,593
Lee Learn Eng	6,407
Yusmadi Yusoff	6,082
Mohd Alfaizal Amjed	5,850
Syamsul Firdaus Mohamed Supri	4,912
Ko Chu Liang	4,752
Mohamiza Mohamad Sarap	4,377
Abdul Wahab Ibrahim	4,256
Cheah Kah Peng	4,213

=== Central Women’s Leadership Council (MPWP) ===
==== Women's Chief ====
Candidate	Members' votes
Haniza Talha	29,540 (52.74%)
Fuziah Salleh	26,475 (47.26%)

==== Deputy Women's Chief ====
Candidate	Members' votes
Daroyah Alwi	28,857 (54.06%)
Rodziah Ismail	24,525 (45.94%)

==== Vice Women's Chiefs ====
Candidate	Members' votes (max. 3)
Faizah Ariffin	Won
Sangetha Jayakumar	Won
Wasanthee Sinnasamy	Won

=== Central Youth Leadership Council (MPAMKP) ===
==== Youth Chief ====
Candidate	Members' votes
Akmal Nasir	17,217 (45.55%)
Afif Bahardin	17,184 (45.47%)
Najwan Halimi	3,393 (8.98%)

==== Deputy Youth Chief ====
Candidate	Members' votes
Hilman Idham	20,364 (57.45%)
Raymond Ahuar	11,778 (33.23%)
Naqiuddin Nazrin	3,305 (9.32%)

==== Vice Youth Chiefs ====
Candidate	Members' votes (max. 3)
Thiban Subbramaniam	Won
Jestin Raj Savarimuthu	Won
Nazree Yunus	Won
