= Ayer Limau =

State constituency in Malacca, Malaysia

Ayer Limau (N03)
Malacca constituency

State constituency
- Legislature: Malacca State Legislative Assembly
MLA
Hameed Mytheen Kunju Basheer
BN
- Constituency created: 2004
- First contested: 2004
- Last contested: 2026

Demographics
- Electors (2026): 15,376

N03 Ayer Limau within Malacca, as used for the 2021 state election

Ayer Limau is a state constituency in Malacca, Malaysia, that has been represented in the Malacca State Legislative Assembly. The state constituency was first contested in 2004 and is mandated to return a single Assemblyman to the Malacca State Legislative Assembly under the first-past-the-post voting system. Since 2021, the State Assemblyman for Ayer Limau is Hameed Mytheen Kunju Basheer from United Malays National Organisation (UMNO) which is part of the state's ruling coalition, Barisan Nasional (BN).

== Definition ==
The Ayer Limau constituency contains the polling districts of Sungai Siput, Sungai Jerneh, Ramuan China Kechil, FELCRA Ramuan China Kechil, Ramuan China Besar, Kampung Lekok and Kampung Pinang.

== Demographics ==
Ethnic breakdown of Ayer Limau's electorate as of 2026
1. Malays (90.6%)
2. Indians (4.30%)
3. Chinese (3.80%)
4. Other Ethnicities (1.40%)

== History ==
=== Polling districts ===
According to the gazette issued on 5 November 2026, the Ayer Limau constituency has a total of 7 polling districts.

State constituency	Polling districts	Code	Location
Ayer Limau (N03)	Sungai Siput	134/03/01	SK Sungai Siput
Ayer Limau (N03)	Sungai Jerneh	134/03/02	SK Sungai Jernih
Ayer Limau (N03)	Ramuan China Kechil	134/03/03	SMK Lubok China
Ayer Limau (N03)	FELCRA Ramuan China Kechil	134/03/04	SRA (JAIM) Ramuan China Kechil
Ayer Limau (N03)	Ramuan China Besar	134/05/05	SK Ramuan China Besar
Ayer Limau (N03)	Kampung Lekok	134/03/06	SK Demang Taha; SRA (JAIM) Paya Rumput, Masjid Tanah
Ayer Limau (N03)	Kampung Pinang	134/03/07	SK Ayer Limau

=== Representation history ===
Members of the Legislative Assembly for Ayer Limau
Assembly	No	Years	Member	Party
Constituency created from Ramuan China and Melekek
11th	N03	2004–2008	Ideris Kassim	BN (UMNO)
12th	N03	2008–2013	Amiruddin Yusop	BN (UMNO)
13th	N03	2013–2018	Amiruddin Yusop	BN (UMNO)
14th	N03	2018–2021	Amiruddin Yusop	BN (UMNO)
15th	N03	2021–2026	Hameed Mytheen Kunju Basheer	BN (UMNO)
16th	N03	2026 – present	Hameed Mytheen Kunju Basheer	BN (UMNO)

== Election results ==
Malacca state election, 2026: Ayer Limau
Party	Candidate	Votes	%	∆%
BN	Hameed Mytheen Kunju Basheer	10,116	88.13	▲36.19
PH	Mohd Jaini Dimon	1,363	11.87	▲1.07
Total valid votes		11,479		
Total rejected ballots		116		
Unreturned ballots		14		
Turnout		11,609	75.49	▲8.78
Registered electors		15,379		
Majority		8,753	76.26	▲61.57
BN hold		Swing		
Source(s) https://electiondata.my/elections/mlk/SE-16/

Malacca state election, 2021: Ayer Limau
Party	Candidate	Votes	%	∆%
BN	Hameed Mytheen Kunju Basheer	3,838	51.94	▲0.34
PN	Nordina Abd Latif	2,753	37.25	▲37.25
PH	Mazenah Baharuddin	798	10.80	▼24.58
Total valid votes		7,389		
Total rejected ballots		80		
Unreturned ballots		20		
Turnout		7,489	66.71	▼16.32
Registered electors		11,227		
Majority		1,085	14.69	▼1.53
BN hold		Swing		
Source(s) https://lom.agc.gov.my/ilims/upload/portal/akta/outputp/1715764/PUB%20583.pdf

Malacca state election, 2018: Ayer Limau
Party	Candidate	Votes	%	∆%
BN	Amiruddin Yusop	4,704	51.60	▼25.17
PKR	Ruslin Hasan	3,225	35.38	▲12.15
PAS	Jamarudin Ahmad	1,187	13.02	▲13.02
Total valid votes		9,116	100.00	
Total rejected ballots		168		
Unreturned ballots		24		
Turnout		9,308	83.03	▼3.49
Registered electors		11,211		
Majority		1,479	16.22	▼37.32
BN hold		Swing		

Malacca state election, 2013: Ayer Limau
Party	Candidate	Votes	%	∆%
BN	Amiruddin Yusop	6,552	76.77	▲0.80
PKR	Halim Bachik	1,983	23.23	▼0.80
Total valid votes		8,535	100.00	
Total rejected ballots		167		
Unreturned ballots		0		
Turnout		8,702	86.52	▼10.21
Registered electors		10,058		
Majority		4,569	53.54	▲1.60
BN hold		Swing		
Source(s) "Federal Government Gazette - Notice of Contested Election, State Legislative Assembly for the State of Selangor [P.U. (B) 192/2013]" (PDF). Attorney General's Chambers of Malaysia. 26 April 2013. Archived from the original (PDF) on 29 December 2019. "Federal Government Gazette - Results of Contested Election and Statements of the Poll after the Official Addition of Votes, State Constituencies for the State of Selangor [P.U. (B) 233/2013]" (PDF). Attorney General's Chambers of Malaysia. 22 May 2013. Archived from the original (PDF) on 2 October 2018.

Malacca state election, 2008: Ayer Limau
Party	Candidate	Votes	%	∆%
BN	Amiruddin Yusop	4,948	75.97	▼2.72
PKR	Abu Hussim Tambi	1,565	24.03	▲2.72
Total valid votes		6,513	100.00	
Total rejected ballots		138		
Unreturned ballots		16		
Turnout		6,667	76.31	▼2.16
Registered electors		8,737		
Majority		3,383	51.94	▼5.44
BN hold		Swing		

Malacca state election, 2004: Ayer Limau
Party	Candidate	Votes	%
BN	Idderis Kassim	5,206	78.69
PKR	Zainon Jaafar	1,188	21.31
Total valid votes		6,394	100.00
Total rejected ballots		119	
Unreturned ballots		0	
Turnout		6,513	78.47
Registered electors		8,300	
Majority		4,018	57.38
This was a new constituency created.
