= National Oversight and Whistleblowers Centre =

Organization based in Malaysia

National Oversight and Whistleblowers Centre Pusat Pemantauan dan Pendedahan Maklumat Kebangsaan NOW
- Formation: 2012
- Type: Non-profit; NGO
- Headquarters: 35-2 The Trillium, Jalan Tasik Utama 6, Medan Niaga Tasik Damai, 57000 Sungai Besi, Kuala Lumpur, Malaysia. Tel.: +603 9054 8738
- Location: Malaysia
- Field: To institute public-driven oversight initiatives and the role of whistleblowers
- Members: Voluntary
- Founding Executive Director: Rafizi Ramli
- Co-founding Director: Akmal Nasir
- Website: nowmalaysia.org

National Oversight and Whistleblowers Centre (NOW; Malay: Pusat Pemantauan dan Pendedahan Maklumat Kebangsaan) is a Malaysian national nonprofit organisation dedicated to recognising the need to institute public-driven oversight initiatives and the role of whistleblowers in the matured society.

It was co-founded in 2012 by Executive Director Rafizi Ramli and Director Akmal Nasir. NOW is headquartered at Sungai Besi Kuala Lumpur.

== Objectives ==
- Monitor, Assess and Report

Act as an oversight body to monitor, assess and report independently of the performance, transparency and accountability of the governments (federal and state governments), parliamentary houses, major government agencies and major corporations with huge public interests

- Act Independently

Act independently and decisively to bring to the public's attention any issues or scandals with major repercussions to the public interests

- Whistleblower Right

Protect the safety, rights and welfare of whistleblowers through the Whistleblowers Protection Fund which disburses grants to qualified whistleblowers to pay for legal fees and loss of income

- Encouragement

Cultivate a conducive environment in the society that encourages whistleblowers to come forward without fear or fervour through policy advocacy, standard setting and campaign initiatives

- Training and Counsultancy

Provide training and consultancy to the public and organisations on the skills and accountability of whistleblowers with the aim to produce more responsible whistleblowers in the society

== History ==
NOW was accused by the Pertubuhan Minda dan Sosial Prihatin, Ramesh Rao in 2015 for not having the Central Bank of Malaysia's permission to collect the funds to close the 1Malaysia Development Berhad (1MDB).

The Malaysian police have investigated both NOW and Malaysian Islamic Economic Development Foundation (YaPEIM) following their report against each other.
