= INTEC Education College =

College in Selangor, Malaysia

- Logo of the INTEC Education College
- Former names: Pusat Pendidikan Persediaan (PPP); Program Persediaan Luar Negeri (PPLN); International Education Centre (INTEC)
- Motto: Think Future, Think INTEC
- Type: Private
- Established: 1982
- Affiliations: MARA University of Technology (UiTM)
- Director: Associate Professor Dr Mior Harris Mior Harun
- Location: Jalan Senangin Satu 17/2A, Seksyen 17, 40200, Shah Alam, Selangor, Malaysia; 3.0459°N 101.5011°E
- Campus: Seksyen 17, Shah Alam
- Nickname: INTEC and UiTM Section 17
- Website: www.intec.edu.my

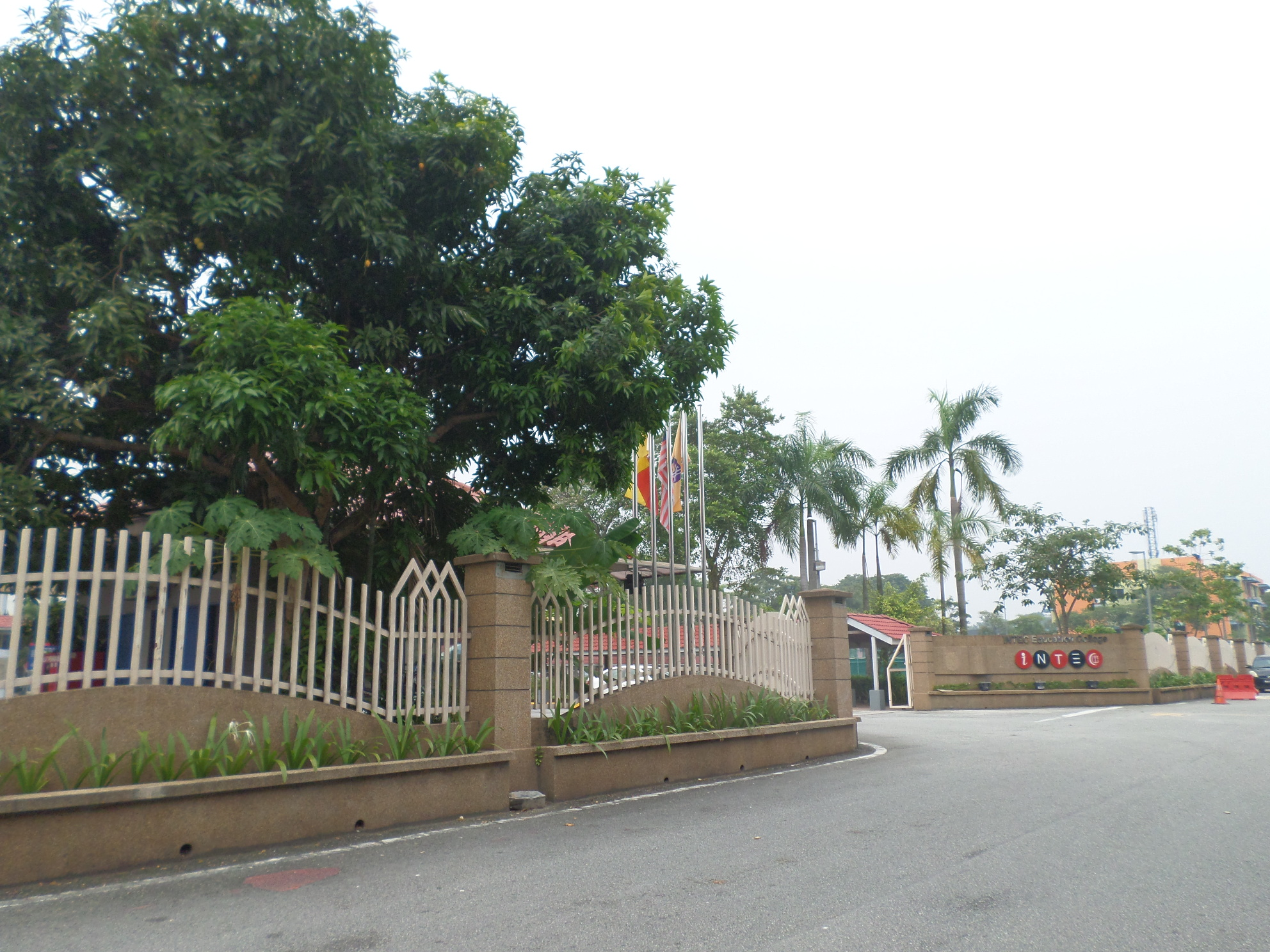
International Education College

INTEC Education College (INTEC), formerly known as the Centre for Preparatory Studies or Pusat Pendidikan Persediaan (PPP), Overseas Preparatory Programme (OPP) or Program Persediaan Luar Negeri (PPLN), and the International Education Centre (INTEC) or International Education College (INTEC).

== History ==
The old logo of INTEC

INTEC Education College,(INTEC) was established at 1982.

On 4 October 2010, it was upgraded to a college by the Executive Committee of UiTM. With the upgrade, the college was renamed as International Education College and given a redesigned logo.

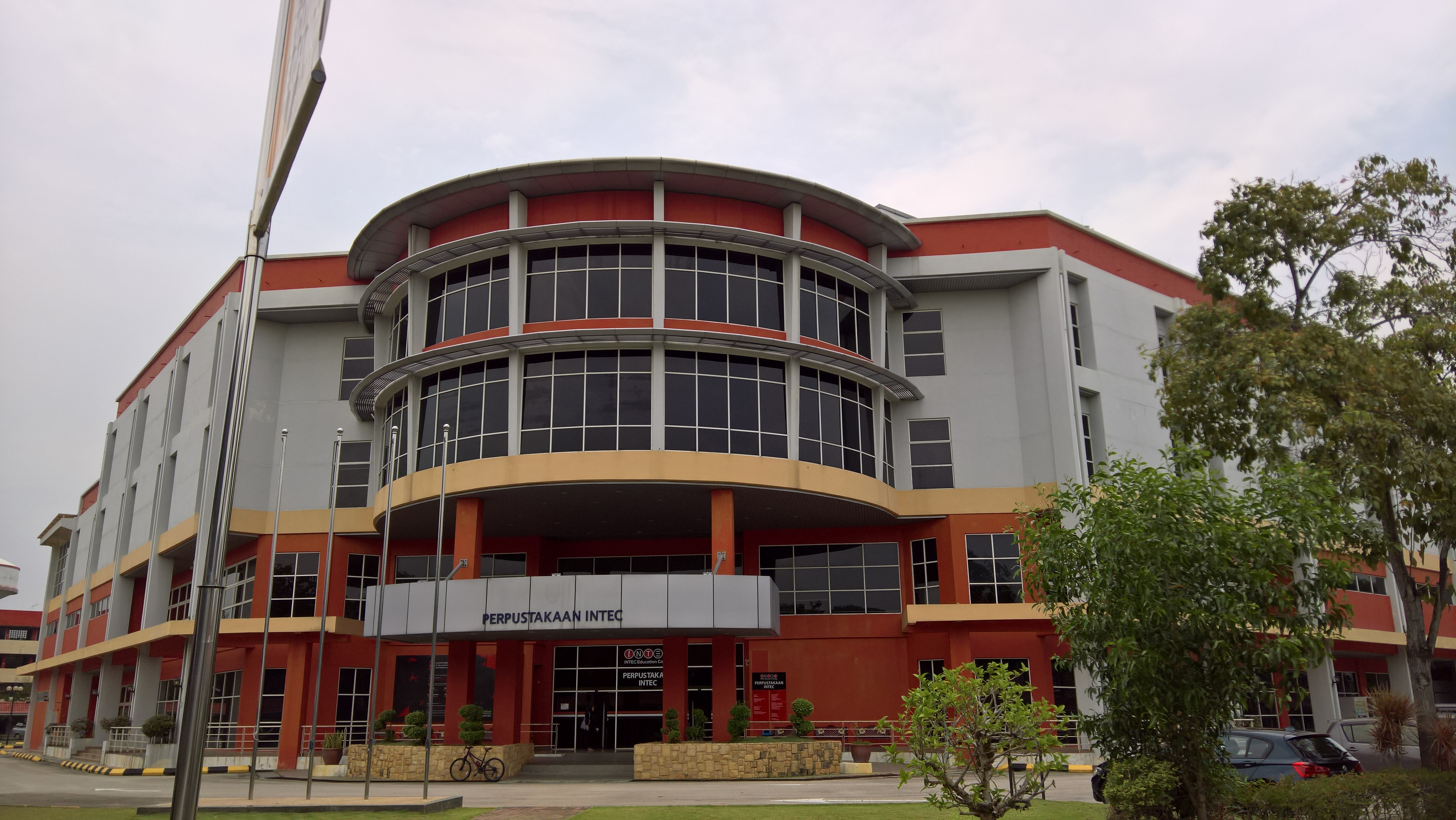
INTEC Library

== See also ==
- MARA University of Technology
