= Akmal Nasir =

Malaysian politician

Yang Berhormat Tuan Akmal Nasir MP
- أَكْمَل نَصْرُٱلله مُحَمَّد نَاصِر
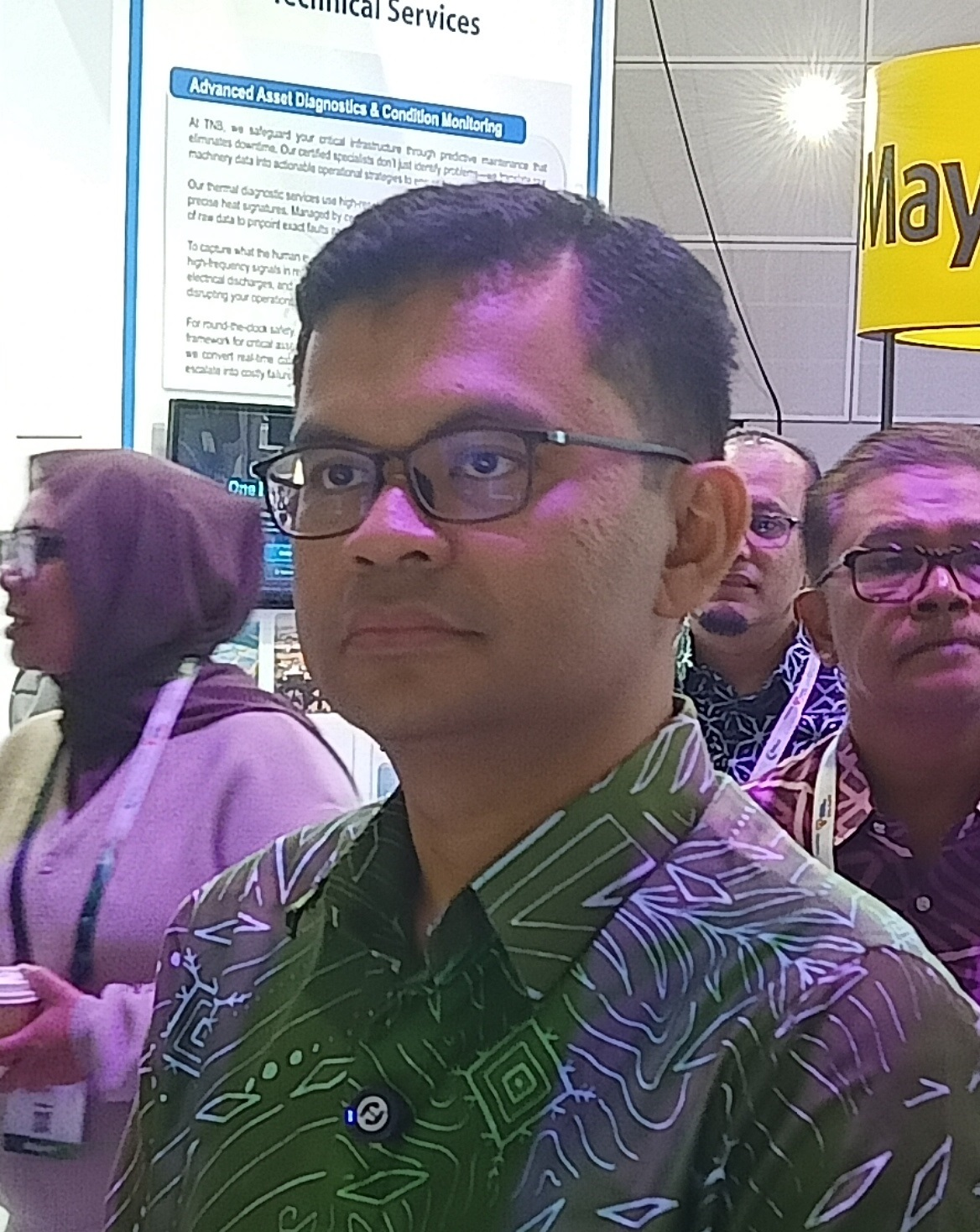
- Akmal Nasir in 2026

Minister of Economy
- Incumbent
- Assumed office 17 December 2025
- Monarch: Ibrahim Iskandar
- Prime Minister: Anwar Ibrahim
- Deputy: Mohd Shahar Abdullah
- Preceded by: Rafizi Ramli; Amir Hamzah Azizan (Acting)
- Constituency: Johor Bahru

Deputy Minister of Energy Transition and Water Transformation
- In office 7 February 2024 – 17 December 2025
- Monarch: Ibrahim Iskandar
- Prime Minister: Anwar Ibrahim
- Minister: Fadillah Yusof
- Preceded by: Himself (Deputy Minister of Energy Transition and Water Transformation)
- Succeeded by: Abdul Rahman Mohamad
- Constituency: Johor Bahru

Deputy Minister of Energy Transition and Public Utilities
- In office 12 December 2023 – 7 February 2024
- Monarchs: Abdullah (2023–2024); Ibrahim Iskandar (January–February 2024)
- Prime Minister: Anwar Ibrahim
- Minister: Fadillah Yusof
- Preceded by: Huang Tiong Sii (Deputy Minister of Natural Resources, Environment and Climate Change)
- Succeeded by: Himself (Deputy Minister of Energy Transition and Public Utilities)
- Constituency: Johor Bahru

Deputy Minister of Local Government Development
- In office 10 December 2022 – 12 December 2023
- Monarch: Abdullah
- Prime Minister: Anwar Ibrahim
- Minister: Nga Kor Ming
- Preceded by: Ismail Muttalib (Deputy Minister of Housing and Local Government)
- Succeeded by: Aiman Athirah Sabu
- Constituency: Johor Bahru

4th Youth Chief of People's Justice Party
- In office 16 November 2018 – 17 July 2022
- President: Anwar Ibrahim
- Deputy: Muhammad Hilman Idham (2018–2020)
- Preceded by: Nik Nazmi Nik Ahmad
- Succeeded by: Adam Adli

Member of the Malaysian Parliament for Johor Bahru
- Incumbent
- Assumed office 9 May 2018
- Preceded by: Shahrir Abdul Samad (BN–UMNO)
- Majority: 19,782 (2018); 16,041 (2022)

Personal details
- Born: Akmal Nasrullah bin Mohd Nasir; 16 September 1986 (age 40) Kuala Lumpur, Malaysia
- Party: People's Justice Party (PKR)
- Other political affiliations: Pakatan Harapan (PH)
- Education: Malay College Kuala Kangsar
- Alma mater: University of Wisconsin-Madison (BSc)
- Occupation: Politician
- Website: akmalnasir.my

Akmal Nasrullah Mohd Nasir (born 16 September 1986), commonly known as Akmal Nasir, is a Malaysian politician who has served as the Minister of Economy since December 2025, previously serving as Deputy Minister of Energy Transition and Water Transformation under Minister Fadillah Yusof from December 2023 to his promotion in December 2025 and Deputy Minister of Local Government Development under Minister Nga Kor Ming from December 2022 to December 2023 in the Unity Government administration under Prime Minister Anwar Ibrahim. He has served as the Member of Parliament (MP) for Johor Bahru since May 2018. He is a member of the People's Justice Party (PKR), a component party of the PH coalition and had served as the 4th Youth Chief of PKR from November 2018 to July 2022. He is presently the second youngest Cabinet minister in the Anwar Ibrahim cabinet after Minister of Youth and Sports Mohammed Taufiq Johari at the age of 30 years, 58 days.

== Education ==
Akmal Nasir received an education from Iskandar National Primary School and Taman Pelangi National School, Johor Bahru. He then continued his education at the Malay College Kuala Kangsar (MCKK) from 1999 to 2003.

Upon graduation, he has received a scholarship to continue his education to the United States. In 2004, he took a year to prepare for the International Education College (INTEC) in Shah Alam.

Upon completion of the preparatory course, he continued his bachelor's degree at the University of Wisconsin-Madison, United States for four years (2005-2009). He has completed his studies in Actuarial Science and Economics, and has also received Dean's List awards in his third year of study.

== Political career ==
Before Akmal Nasir became an MP, he was the founder and director of an NGO called National Oversight and Whistleblowers Centre (NOW) together with Rafizi Ramli. NOW Malaysia is the NGO that was responsible in exposing national financial scandals during the reign of former Prime Minister, Najib Razak. Some of them include alleged corruption in National Feedlot Corporation (NFC) that involved Shahrizat Abdul Jalil and alleged misuse of funds of Malaysian Islamic Economy Development Foundation (YaPEIM).

In the 2018 Malaysian general election, he contested the Johor Bahru parliamentary seat under the ticket of Pakatan Harapan and won a two-way contest against Shahrir Abdul Samad representing Barisan Nasional.

Akmal Nasir had contested the People's Justice Party (PKR) Youth Wing Chief in 2018 party election which he won by securing a narrow victory.

=== Deputy Minister of Energy Transition and Public Utilies ===
In a cabinet reshuffle on 12 December 2023, the Ministry of Natural Resources, Environment and Climate Change was split into the new Ministry of Natural Resources and Environmental Sustainability and the Ministry of Energy Transition and Public Utilies. Akmal Nasrullah was appointed the Deputy Minister of Energy Transition and Public Utilities, deputising for Minister Fadillah. He also described the creation of his ministry as en effort of the government to prioritise renewable energy and expressed his excitement to work with Fadillah.

== Controversies ==
In May 2019, Akmal Nasir had caused an uproar when he attended an interfaith breaking fast event at a Sikh gurdwara in Johor Bahru during the Ramadan fasting month for Muslim. He was rebuked by the Sultan Ibrahim of Johor for his insensitive action. However, the Minister in the Prime Minister's Department for Religious Affairs, Mujahid Yusof Rawa had clarify that it is not an issue with Muslims breaking their Ramadan fast at a non-Muslim house of worship and Akmal Nasir's attendance as an MP will only help to foster better ties between the races and eliminate Islamophobia.

== Election results ==
Parliament of Malaysia
| Year | Constituency | Candidate | Votes | Pct | Opponent(s) | Votes | Pct | Ballots cast | Majority | Turnout |
|---|---|---|---|---|---|---|---|---|---|---|
| 2018 | P160 Johor Bahru | Akmal Nasrullah Mohd Nasir (PKR) | 50,052 | 62.45% | Shahrir Abdul Samad (UMNO) | 30,270 | 37.55% | 81,645 | 19,782 | 80.50% |
| 2022 | P160 Johor Bahru | Akmal Nasrullah Mohd Nasir (PKR) | 43,252 | 45.82% | Johan Ropi (UMNO) | 27,211 | 28.83% | 93,162 | 16,041 | 69.22% |
| 2022 | P160 Johor Bahru | Akmal Nasrullah Mohd Nasir (PKR) | 43,252 | 45.82% | Mohd Motah Yacob (BERSATU) | 22,075 | 23.38% | 93,162 | 16,041 | 69.22% |

== Honours ==
=== Honours of Malaysia ===
- Malaysia
  - Recipient of the 17th Yang di-Pertuan Agong Installation Medal (2024)
