= Farhash Wafa Salvador =

Malaysian businessman and politician

Yang Berbahagia Dato' Seri Farhash Wafa Salvador SJMK DPPN PYGP DCSM PGDK JP
- فرهسه وفا السلفادور ريزل مبارك

State Chairman of the People's Justice Party of Perak
- In office September 2018 – 12 February 2022
- President: Anwar Ibrahim
- Preceded by: Muhammad Nur Manuty
- Succeeded by: Lee Boon Chye (acting); Chang Lih Kang

Political Secretary to the President of the People's Justice Party
- In office September 2018 – 2022
- President: Anwar Ibrahim

Personal details
- Born: Farhash Wafa Salvador Rizal Mubarak; 5 July 1982 (age 44) Ipoh, Perak, Malaysia
- Party: People's Justice Party (PKR) (2004–present) (Note: Farhash Wafa Salvador is no longer active in the PKR party and the political arena.)
- Other political affiliations: Barisan Alternatif (BA) (2004); Pakatan Rakyat (PR) (2008–2015); Pakatan Harapan (PH) (2016–present)
- Education: University of Portsmouth (BA, MSc)
- Occupation: Politician, businessman

Farhash Wafa Salvador Rizal Mubarak (Jawi: فرهسه وفا السلفادور ريزل مبارك; born 5 July 1982) is a Malaysian businessman and politician who was the former Political Secretary to the President of the People's Justice Party (PKR), Anwar Ibrahim from September 2018 to 2022. He was also the Chairman of the Perak State Leadership Council (MPN) of the People's Justice Party (PKR) from September 2018 until his resignation in February 2022.

== Early life and education ==
Farhash Wafa Salvador Rizal Mubarak was born in Ipoh, Perak, Malaysia on 5 July 1982. Farhash Wafa Salvador received his Bachelor of Arts (BA) in Business Administration and the Master of Science (MSc) in Finance from the University of Portsmouth, United Kingdom. He also holds an Executive Certificate in Public Leadership from the Harvard Kennedy School, Harvard University, United States.

== Business career ==
Farhash Wafa Salvador began his career in the business world with involvement in several key sectors including construction, technology and services.

In 2014, Farhash Wafa Salvador started the company Swag Technologies. He was also appointed as an Independent Non-Executive Director of Bluemont Group Limited, a company listed on the Singapore Exchange (SGX), and now known as Southern Archipelago Limited.

== Political career ==
Farhash Wafa Salvador first joined the People's Justice Party (PKR) around 2004 and was active in the party's Reformasi movement. He is known as a young figure who is close to the President of PKR, Anwar Ibrahim and is often involved in the party's strategic discussions.

In September 2018, after Pakatan Harapan's victory in the 2018 general election, Farhash Wafa Salvador was appointed as the Political Secretary to the President of People's Justice Party (PKR), Anwar Ibrahim. He also contested the 2018 PKR leadership election for a position on the Central Leadership Council. He served as Chairman of the Perak State Leadership Council (MPN) of PKR from September 2018 until his resignation in February 2022.

In the 2022 PKR leadership election, Farhash contested for the position of Vice-President. He received 27,015 votes, the sixth-highest total among the candidates.

In the 2022 general election, Farhash Wafa Salvador was appointed as the Pakatan Harapan (PH) Election Machinery Chairman for the Parliament of Tambun. He managed to give the victory to Anwar Ibrahim, who contested for the first time in the Tambun, although he won with a relatively narrow majority, with only 3,736 votes defeating Ahmad Faizal Azumu of BERSATU, Aminuddin Md Hanafiah of UMNO, and Abdul Rahim Tahir of PEJUANG.

In March 2024, Farhash Wafa Salvador confirmed that he was no longer involved in politics or government, instead choosing to focus on the corporate world and entrepreneurship.

== Controversies and issues ==
=== HeiTech Padu share ownership ===
In March 2024, Farhash Wafa Salvador's company, Rosetta Partners, reportedly purchased a 15.9% stake in HeiTech Padu Berhad, making it the company's largest shareholder. This sparked controversy because HeiTech Padu had at the time secured a government contract worth RM190 million. A Bloomberg report claimed that the Prime Minister had intervened to prevent the Malaysian Anti-Corruption Commission (MACC) from investigating the share purchase. Farhash Wafa Salvador then released his shareholding a month later.

=== Allegations of coal license approval in Sabah ===
In July 2025, Farhash Wafa Salvador once again came into the spotlight after media reports claimed that a company linked to him, Bumi Suria Sdn Bhd, was granted a 70,000 hectare coal exploration license in Sabah. Farhash Wafa Salvador denied this claim and demanded an apology from the media that published the report, in addition to filing a police report. Chief Minister of Sabah, Hajiji Noor also explained that no license was issued as claimed by some parties.

== Honours ==
=== Honours of Malaysia ===
- Kelantan
  - Knight Grand Commander of the Order of the Life of the Crown of Kelantan (SJMK) – Dato' (2024)
  - Recipient of the Order of the Most Distinguished and Most Valiant Warrior (PYGP) (2026)
  - Justice of the Peace (JP) (2023)
- Malacca
  - Knight Commander of the Exalted Order of Malacca (DCSM) – Datuk Wira (2023)
- Penang
  - Knight Commander of the Order of the Defender of State (DPPN) – Dato' Seri (2025)
- Sabah
  - Commander of the Order of Kinabalu (PGDK) – Datuk (2023)
