= Amidi Abdul Manan =

Malaysian politician

- عميدي عبد المنان

President of the Malaysian Islamic Youth Movement
- In office 2011–2015
- Preceded by: Muhamad Razak Idris
- Succeeded by: Mohamad Raimi Abdul Rahim

Personal details
- Born: Amidi bin Abdul Manan
- Citizenship: Malaysia
- Party: People's Justice Party (PKR)
- Other political affiliations: Pakatan Harapan (PH)
- Education: International Islamic University Malaysia; University of Malaya (BA); National University of Malaysia (MA)
- Occupation: Politician

Amidi bin Abdul Manan (also known as Cikgu Amidi) is a Malaysian academic, civil society activist, and politician. He served as the president of the Malaysian Islamic Youth Movement (ABIM) from 2011 to 2015. He is currently a member of the Central Leadership Council of the People's Justice Party (PKR). Known for his background in national Islamic student and youth movements, he has been prominent in shaping the party's religious discourse.

== Education ==
Amidi pursued his higher education in Malaysia, focusing on Islamic jurisprudence and education. He earned a Diploma in Education (Islamic Education) from the International Islamic University Malaysia (IIUM), followed by a Bachelor of Sharia (Fiqh and Usul) from the University of Malaya (UM). He later obtained a Master of Islamic Studies (Sharia) from the National University of Malaysia (UKM).

== Student activism ==
Amidi spent his early career heavily involved in Malaysian student and youth activism, serving as the president of the National Muslim Students Association of Malaysia (PKPIM) from 1997 to 1999. In September 1998, while serving as PKPIM president, Amidi was arrested and detained under the Internal Security Act (ISA). His detention occurred during the height of the Reformasi movement, which followed the dismissal and subsequent arrest of former Deputy Prime Minister Anwar Ibrahim.

Amidi was among at least 15 individuals detained under the ISA during late September 1998, following large-scale demonstrations in Kuala Lumpur on 20 and 21 September that resulted in over 120 police arrests. The ISA detainees included various student leaders, academics, and political activists associated with the movement. Human rights organisation Amnesty International designated Amidi and the other ISA detainees as prisoners of conscience, raising concerns regarding their initial incommunicado status and the potential risk of institutional ill-treatment. Amidi was subsequently released from custody. Reflecting on the incident in later years, Amidi noted that the political environment for student leadership during his detention under the Mahathir Mohamad administration contrasted significantly with the more permissive approach toward student activism observed under subsequent governments.

== Professional career ==
After several years of student activism, Amidi transitioned into mainstream civil society leadership and was elected as the eighth president of the Malaysian Islamic Youth Movement (ABIM), a major national Islamic youth organisation. He held the presidency from 2011 to 2015, succeeding Muhamad Razak Idris and preceding Mohamad Raimi Abdul Rahim. During his tenure, he focused on national advocacy for civil society empowerment, humanitarian missions for vulnerable communities domestically and regionally, and the application of Maqasid Sharia in national governance. In December 2013, Amidi publicly urged the Malaysian federal government to sever diplomatic relations with the Holy See following speculation that the Vatican intended to appoint a more confrontational archbishop in Kuala Lumpur. He argued that the move could spark severe interreligious friction amid the ongoing legal disputes regarding the usage of the word "Allah" in Malaysia.

Amidi also served as a vice-president of the Malaysian Youth Council (MBM). Beyond his activism, he is an external research fellow at the Institute of Electoral Studies and Advancement of Democracy (IESAD), where he provides research and commentary on Islamic sociopolitics, constitutional discourse, and intercultural dialogue. Amidi has also worked across the educational and Islamic administrative sectors. He served as an academic educator and lecturer at the Centre for Foundation and General Studies (PADU) at the University of Selangor (UNISEL). Amidi later transitioned into senior religious administration at the Islamic Dawah Foundation Malaysia (YADIM), a federal statutory body. He holds the office of Senior Director overseeing the Ummah and Women Development Sector. In this capacity, he manages national-level Islamic propagation (dakwah) initiatives, community welfare programs, and leadership training programs for Islamic propagation cadres. He is also a regular columnist and speaker on nation-building, social ethics, and institutional integrity.

== Political career ==
Following his tenure in civil society movements, Amidi entered mainstream politics through the People's Justice Party (PKR). During the party's internal leadership elections in 2022, he was elected by delegates to the PKR Central Leadership Council (MPP) for the 2022–2025 term. In August 2022, party president Anwar Ibrahim appointed Amidi as the Director of the Bureau of Religious Understanding and Empowerment. In this capacity, Amidi served as the primary spokesperson on Islamic affairs and political theology. He frequently issued public statements criticising the politicisation of religion, along with the political rhetoric of the Malaysian Islamic Party (PAS).

Amidi made his electoral debut during the 2023 Selangor state election when PKR selected him as the Pakatan Harapan (PH) candidate for the Ijok state seat. In a three-cornered fight, he narrowly lost the constituency to Perikatan Nasional (PN) candidate Jefri Mejan. The PN candidate won the seat with 12,183 votes against Amidi's 11,271 votes, securing a majority of 912 votes, while an independent candidate, CK Tan, received 194 votes.

== Election results ==
Selangor State Legislative Assembly
Year	Constituency	Candidate	Votes	Pct	Opponent(s)	Votes	Pct	Ballots cast	Majority	Turnout
2023	N11 Ijok	Amidi Abdul Manan (PKR)	11,271	47.66%	Jefri Mejan (PAS)	12,183	51.52%	23,823	912	77.70%
2023	N11 Ijok	Amidi Abdul Manan (PKR)	11,271	47.66%	CK Tan (IND)	194	0.08%	23,823	912	77.70%
