= Abun Sui Anyit =

Malaysian politician

Yang Berhormat Senator Tuan Abun Sui Anyit

Senator

Appointed by Yang di-Pertuan Agong
- Incumbent
- Assumed office 20 March 2023
- Monarchs: Abdullah (2023–2024); Ibrahim Iskandar (2024–present)
- Prime Minister: Anwar Ibrahim

Member of the Central Leadership Council of People's Justice Party
- Incumbent
- Assumed office 29 July 2022
- President: Anwar Ibrahim

Branch Chief of the People's Justice Party of Hulu Rajang
- Incumbent
- Assumed office 2014
- President: Anwar Ibrahim

Personal details
- Born: 1973 (age 52–53)
- Party: People's Justice Party (PKR) (2009–present)
- Other political affiliations: Pakatan Rakyat (PR) (2009–2015); Pakatan Harapan (PH) (2015–present)
- Education: Universiti Teknologi MARA
- Occupation: Politician
- Profession: Lawyer

Abun Sui Anyit (born 1973) is a Malaysian politician and lawyer. He served as Senator since March 2023. He is a member of the Central Leadership Council of People's Justice Party (PKR), a component party of Pakatan Harapan (PH) coalitions.

== Political career ==
Abun Sui Anyit joined PKR in 2009. From 2010 to 2018, He become member of the Sarawak State Leaders Council Committee. Since 2014, he was the Branch Chief of the People's Justice Party of Hulu Rajang.

In 2025, he announced his candidacy for PKR vice-president post for upcoming party election.

== Election results ==
Parliament of Malaysia
Year	Constituency	Candidate	Votes	Pct	Opponent(s)	Votes	Pct	Ballots cast	Majority	Turnout
2013	P216 Hulu Rajang	Abun Sui Anyit (PKR)	3,283	22.60%	Wilson Ugak Kumbong (PRS)	9,117	62.75%	14,763	5,834	68.08%
2013	P216 Hulu Rajang	Abun Sui Anyit (PKR)	3,283	22.60%	George Lagong (SWP)	685	1.05%	14,763	5,834	68.08%
2018	P216 Hulu Rajang	Abun Sui Anyit (PKR)	5,519	31.80%	Wilson Ugak Kumbong (PRS)	11,834	68.20%	17,727	6,315	64.41%
2022	P216 Hulu Rajang	Abun Sui Anyit (PKR)	7,951	33.97%	Wilson Ugak Kumbong (PRS)	15,456	66.03%	23,807	7,505	53.89%
