= Isaiah Jacob =

Malaysian politician (born 1966)

Yang Berhormat Senator Tuan Isaiah Jacob

Senator

Appointed by the Yang di-Pertuan Agong
- Incumbent
- Assumed office 20 March 2023
- Monarchs: Abdullah (2023–2024); Ibrahim Iskandar
- Prime Minister: Anwar Ibrahim

Personal details
- Born: Isaiah a/l D. Jacob; 1966 (age 59–60)
- Party: People's Justice Party (PKR)
- Other political affiliations: Pakatan Harapan (PH)
- Relations: V. David (uncle)

Isaiah a/l D. Jacob (born 1966) is a Malaysian politician who has served as a Senator since March 2023. He is a member of the People's Justice Party (PKR), a component party of the Pakatan Harapan (PH) coalition.

== Political career ==
On 20 March 2023, Isaiah Jacob sworn in as Senator.

On April 3, 2023, all senators stood on one leg for one minute as a sign of support and solidarity for the one-legged Isaiah and persons with disabilities (PwD).

Isaiah’s cousin is trade unionist V David, who was a trade unionist and an MP who represented Bangsar, Dato' Kramat, Damansara, and Puchong.

Although David was his cousin, Isaiah grew up calling the former “uncle” as the senator was 34 years younger.

In 2025 party election, Isaiah Jacob contested as member of the Central Leadership Council of PKR managed gather around 1,396 votes and placed in 66th place.
