= Mohd Yahya Mat Sahri =

Malaysian politician

Political Secretary to the Minister of Home Affairs
- Incumbent
- Assumed office 19 April 2024
- Minister: Saifuddin Nasution Ismail
- Preceded by: Johari Kassim

Chairman of the Malaysian Cooperative Institute
- In office 2023–2024
- Prime Minister: Anwar Ibrahim
- Minister: Ewon Benedick
- Succeeded by: Onn Abu Bakar

Director of the Mobilisation of People's Justice Party
- Incumbent
- Assumed office 2022
- President: Anwar Ibrahim

Tanjong Karang PKR Branch Chief
- Incumbent
- Assumed office 2022
- President: Anwar Ibrahim
- State Chairman: Amirudin Shari

Personal details
- Party: National Justice Party (keADILan) (1998–2003); People's Justice Party (PKR) (2003–present)
- Other political affiliations: Barisan Alternatif (BA) (1999–2004); Pakatan Rakyat (PR) (2008–2015); Pakatan Harapan (PH) (2015–present)
- Occupation: Politician
- Profession: Businessman

Mohd Yahya bin Mat Sahri is a Malaysian politician who served as Political Secretary to the
Minister of Home Affairs Saifuddin Nasution Ismail since April 2024. He is a Branch Chief of Tanjong Karang and member of People's Justice Party (PKR), a component party of Pakatan Harapan (PH) coalitions.

== Political career ==
Mohd Yahya Mat Sahri first contested on Permatang seat in 1999 state election against then Menteri Besar of Selangor Abu Hassan Omar, he was defeated with the majority of 2,956 votes. He later on contested in 2013 and 2023 state election, he was defeated with the majority of 1,026 votes and 1,728 votes respectively.

At the party level, Mohd Yahya Mat Sahri elected as member of the Central Leadership Council in 2007 party election. In 2010 party election, he first contest the vice-president post and was placed in 9th place for vice-president post election. In 2014 party election, he attempted contest the vice-president post and was placed in 12th place for vice-president post election. In 2018 party election, he contested member of the Central Leadership Council and was gather around 10,865 votes and was placed in 58th place.

In 2022 party election, he was elected as member of the Central Leadership Council with 804 votes and was placed in 5th place. At the same time, he was elected as Tanjong Karang PKR Branch Chief. In 2025 party election, he was fail reelected as member of the Central Leadership Council with 3,674 votes and was placed in 27th place. However, he was reelected as Tanjong Karang PKR Branch Chief unopposed.

== Election results ==
Selangor State Legislative Assembly
| Year | Constituency | Candidate | Votes | Pct | Opponent(s) | Votes | Pct | Ballots cast | Majority | Turnout |
|---|---|---|---|---|---|---|---|---|---|---|
| 1999 | N10 Permatang | Mohd Yahya Mat Sahri (keADILan) | 5,655 | 39.65% | Abu Hassan Omar (UMNO) | 8,621 | 60.35% | 14,755 | 2,956 | 73.72% |
| 2013 | N09 Permatang | Mohd Yahya Mat Sahri (PKR) | 8,023 | 46.79% | Sulaiman Abdul Razak (UMNO) | 9,049 | 52.77% | 17,497 | 1,026 | 89.11% |
| 2013 | N09 Permatang | Mohd Yahya Mat Sahri (PKR) | 8,023 | 46.79% | Low Tan (IND) | 76 | 0.44% | 17,497 | 1,026 | 89.11% |
| 2023 | N09 Permatang | Mohd Yahya Mat Sahri (PKR) | 11,122 | 46.40% | Nurul Syazwani Noh (BERSATU) | 12,850 | 53.60% | 24,175 | 1,728 | 78.50% |
