= National Feedlot Corporation =

Malaysian agriculture business

National Feedlot Corporation NFCorp
- Type: Private Limited Company
- Industry: Corporation
- Founded: 2006
- Headquarters: Gemas, Negeri Sembilan, Malaysia
- Key people: Datuk Dr Mohamad Salleh Ismail (Chairman); Datuk Seri Shahrizat Abdul Jalil (Director)
- Products: Livestock and Beef production

National Feedlot Corporation is a private company owned by Agroscience Industries Sdn Bhd, with participation from the Government of Malaysia. Its commercial interest is the development of a planned, integrated and sustainable Malaysian beef industry through the development of the fully integrated livestock farming and beef production facility that manages the importation of livestock, feedlotting, slaughtering, processing, packing and marketing of beef in Malaysia.

National Feedlot Corporation was embroiled in controversy involving their investments on high-end properties. Further revelations were made regarding investments in high-end condominiums by the corporation. However, later court proceedings found the allegations of misappropriation in relation to the investments to be false.

It was also revealed that a prominent businessman was charged and arrested for cheating NFC with RM2 million in consultancy fees and for bribing the police.

NFCorp chairman Datuk Dr Mohamad Salleh Ismail, who is also the husband of United Malays National Organisation (UMNO) Wanita Chief Datuk Seri Shahrizat Abdul Jalil; was completely acquitted and discharged of all criminal charges by sessions court on 24 November 2015.

In May 2018, the new Pakatan Harapan (PH) took office as the ruling government. Subsequently, in August 2018, the Finance Ministry released a statement that the government is going to take legal action against the National Feedlot Corporation for the outstanding debt of RM248 million in soft loans.
