= Mohd Rafee Ibrahim =

Malaysian politician

Member of the Central Leadership Council of People's Justice Party
- In office 2022–2025
- President: Anwar Ibrahim

State Chairman of Malacca of the People's Justice Party
- Incumbent
- Assumed office 2024
- Preceded by: Aminuddin Harun

State Deputy Chairman of Malacca of the People's Justice Party
- In office 2022–2024
- Succeeded by: Jagatheson Ramiah

Branch Chief of Hang Tuah Jaya of the People's Justice Party
- In office 2022–2025
- President: Anwar Ibrahim
- State Chairman: himself
- Succeeded by: Shamsul Iskandar Mohd Akin

President of the Hang Tuah Jaya Municipal Council
- In office 2019–2020
- Preceded by: Mahani Masban
- Succeeded by: Shadam Othman

Personal details
- Occupation: Politician
- Profession: Teacher

Mohd Rafee bin Ibrahim is a Malaysian politician who served as Member of the Central Leadership Council of People's Justice Party (PKR) from 2022 to 2025, Branch Chief of Hang Tuah Jaya of the PKR from 2022 to 2025. He also the candidate of Ayer Molek in 2021 Malacca state election. He is a member of People's Justice Party (PKR), a component party of Pakatan Harapan (PH).

== Political career ==
In 2019, Mohd Rafee Ibrahim served as President of the Hang Tuah Jaya Municipal Council until 2020. Mohd Rafee Ibrahim contest the Ayer Molek seat in 2021 Malacca state election, he was defeat with the majority of 2,802 votes.

Mohd Rafee Ibrahim successfully reelected as Hang Tuah Jaya PKR Branch Chief in 2022, defeating then MP for Hang Tuah Jaya Shamsul Iskandar Mohd Akin. At the same year, he was elected as Member of the Central Leadership Council of PKR. In April 2025, he fail to reelected as Hang Tuah Jaya PKR Branch Chief defeated by Shamsul Iskandar Mohd Akin. At the party election in May 2025, he was fail reelected as Member of the Central Leadership Council of PKR.

== Election results ==
Malacca State Legislative Assembly
Year	Constituency	Candidate	Votes	Pct	Opponent(s)	Votes	Pct	Ballots cast	Majority	Turnout
2021	N18 Ayer Molek	Mohd Rafee Ibrahim (PKR)	2,446	19.68%	Rahmad Mariman (UMNO)	6,348	51.07%	12,430	2,802	69.59%
2021	N18 Ayer Molek	Mohd Rafee Ibrahim (PKR)	2,446	19.68%	Mohd Fadly Samin (BERSATU)	3,546	28.53%	12,430	2,802	69.59%
2021	N18 Ayer Molek	Mohd Rafee Ibrahim (PKR)	2,446	19.68%	Ahmad Muaz Idris (IND)	90	0.72%	12,430	2,802	69.59%
