= Indera Mahkota (federal constituency) =

Federal constituency of Pahang, Malaysia

Indera Mahkota (P082)
Pahang constituency

Federal constituency
- Legislature: Dewan Rakyat
- MP: Saifuddin Abdullah; PN
- Constituency created: 2003
- First contested: 2004
- Last contested: 2022

Demographics
- Population (2020): 248,946
- Electors (2022): 120,549
- Area (km²): 392
- Pop. density (per km²): 635.1

Indera Mahkota is a federal constituency in Kuantan District, Pahang, Malaysia, that has been represented in the Dewan Rakyat since 2004.

The federal constituency was created in the 2003 redistribution and is mandated to return a single member to the Dewan Rakyat under the first past the post voting system.

== Demographics ==
Ethnic breakdown of Indera Mahkota's electorate as of 2022
1. Malay (68.7%)
2. Chinese (25.4%)
3. Indian (5.40%)
4. Other ethnicities (0.50%)

As of 2020, Indera Mahkota has a population of 248,946 people.

Age breakdown of Indera Mahkota's electorate as of 2022
1. 18-20 (8.48%)
2. 21-29 (25.9%)
3. 30-39 (23.2%)
4. 40-49 (16.1%)
5. 50-59 (12.7%)
6. 60-69 (9.16%)
7. 70-79 (3.37%)
8. 80-89 (0.88%)
9. above 90 (0.15%)
Gender breakdown of Indera Mahkota's electorate as of 2022
1. Male (50.0%)
2. Female (50.0%)

== History ==
=== Polling districts ===
According to the federal gazette issued on 31 October 2022, the Indera Mahkota constituency is divided into 24 polling districts.

State constituency	Polling districts	Code	Location
Beserah (N12)	Cherating	082/12/01	SK Cherating
Beserah (N12)	Sungai Ular	082/12/02	SK Sungai Ular
Beserah (N12)	Balok Makmur	082/12/03	SK Balok Baru
Beserah (N12)	Balok Baru	082/12/04	SK Balok Makmur
Beserah (N12)	Balok	082/12/05	SK Balok; SMK Chengal Lempong
Beserah (N12)	Sungai Karang	082/12/06	SK Sungai Karang
Beserah (N12)	Alor Batu	082/12/07	SK Jabor
Beserah (N12)	Batu Hitam	082/12/08	SMK Beserah
Beserah (N12)	Kampung Beserah	082/12/09	SK Beserah
Beserah (N12)	Seri Pelindong	082/12/10	SMK Pelindung
Beserah (N12)	Alor Akar	082/12/11	Kolej Vokesional Kuantan
Beserah (N12)	Air Putih Baru	082/12/12	SMK Air Putih
Beserah (N12)	Air Putih	082/12/13	SJK (C) Pei Chai
Semambu (N13)	Kampung Padang	082/13/01	SK Kampong Padang
Semambu (N13)	Rtp Bukit Goh	082/13/02	SK Rtp Bukit Goh
Semambu (N13)	Bukit Istana	082/13/03	SK Sungai Talam
Semambu (N13)	Semambu	082/13/04	SK Semambu
Semambu (N13)	Bukit Sekilau	082/13/05	SK Bukit Sekilau; Kolej Universiti Yayasan Pahang; Tabika KEMAS kAMPUNG Bukit Sekilau
Semambu (N13)	Indera Mahkota 1	082/13/06	SMK Cenderawasih
Semambu (N13)	Bukit Ubi	082/13/07	Dewan Kelab Sukan Komuniti DUN Semambu
Semambu (N13)	Bukit Setongkol	082/13/08	SK Bukit Setongkol
Semambu (N13)	Taman LKNP	082/13/09	SJK (C) Chung Ching 2
Semambu (N13)	Chenderawasih	082/13/10	SK Cenderawasih; SA Rakyat (KAFA) Baitul Huda Cenderawasih
Semambu (N13)	Indera Mahkota 2	082/13/11	SMK Tengku Panglima Tengku Muhamad; SK Indera Mahkota

=== Representation history ===
Members of Parliament for Indera Mahkota
Parliament	No	Years	Member	Party	Vote Share
Constituency created from Kuantan
11th	P082	2004–2008	Adnan Wan Mamat (عدنان وان مامت)	BN (UMNO)	25,177; 69.69%
12th	P082	2008–2013	Azan Ismail (أذن إسماعيل)	PR (PKR)	19,823; 51.33%
13th	P082	2013–2015	Fauzi Abdul Rahman (فوزي بن عبدالرحمن)	PR (PKR)	30,584; 56.81%
13th	P082	2015–2018	Fauzi Abdul Rahman (فوزي بن عبدالرحمن)	PH (PKR)	30,584; 56.81%
14th	P082	2018–2020	Saifuddin Abdullah (سيف الدين عبدالله)	PH (PKR)	28,578; 44.85%
14th	P082	2020–2022	Saifuddin Abdullah (سيف الدين عبدالله)	PN (BERSATU)	28,578; 44.85%
15th	P082	2022–2026	Saifuddin Abdullah (سيف الدين عبدالله)	PN (BERSATU)	41,692; 44.65%
15th	P082	2026	Saifuddin Abdullah (سيف الدين عبدالله)	Independent	41,692; 44.65%
15th	P082	2026-present	Saifuddin Abdullah (سيف الدين عبدالله)	PN (WAWASAN)	41,692; 44.65%

=== State constituency ===
Parliamentary constituency	State constituency						
Parliamentary constituency	1955–59*	1959–1974	1974–1986	1986–1995	1995–2004	2004–2018	2018–present
Indera Mahkota						Beserah	
Indera Mahkota						Semambu	

=== Historical boundaries ===
State Constituency	Area	
State Constituency	2003	2018
Beserah	Air Putih; Balok; Beserah; Cherating; Taman Pelindung Perdana	
Semambu	Bukit Goh; Indera Mahkota; Kampung Padang; Kota SAS; Semambu	

=== Current state assembly members ===
No.	State Constituency	Member	Coalition (Party)
N12	Beserah	Andansura Rabu	PN (PAS)
N13	Semambu	Chan Chun Kuang	PH (PKR)

=== Local governments & postcodes ===
No.	State Constituency	Local Government	Postcode
N12	Beserah	Kuantan City Council	25050, 25150, 25200, 25250, 25300, 25350, 26080, 26100 Kuantan; 26150, 26190 Balok
N13	Semambu	Kuantan City Council	25050, 25150, 25200, 25250, 25300, 25350, 26080, 26100 Kuantan; 26150, 26190 Balok

== Election results ==
Malaysian general election, 2022
Party	Candidate	Votes	%	∆%
PN	Saifuddin Abdullah	41,692	44.65	▲44.65
PH	Zuraidi Ismail	33,293	35.65	▼9.20
BN	Quek Tai Seong	16,530	17.70	▼9.96
PEJUANG	Mohamad Nor Sundari	1,860	2.00	▲2.00
Total valid votes		93,379	100.00	
Total rejected ballots		783		
Unreturned ballots		284		
Turnout		94,446	77.46	▼6.23
Registered electors		120,549		
Majority		8,399	9.00	▼8.18
PN gain from PKR		Swing		?
Source(s) https://lom.agc.gov.my/ilims/upload/portal/akta/outputp/1753278/PUB611_2022.pdf

Malaysian general election, 2018
Party	Candidate	Votes	%	∆%
PKR	Saifuddin Abdullah	28,578	44.85	▼11.96
BN	Johan Mat Sah	17,628	27.66	▼15.11
PAS	Nasrudin Hassan	17,515	27.49	▲27.49
Total valid votes		63,721	100.00	
Total rejected ballots		622		
Unreturned ballots		269		
Turnout		64,612	83.69	▼1.54
Registered electors		77,208		
Majority		10,950	17.18	▲3.20
PKR hold		Swing		
Source(s) "His Majesty's Government Gazette - Notice of Contested Election, Parliament for the State of Pahang [P.U. (B) 238/2018]" (PDF). Attorney General's Chambers of Malaysia. 3 May 2018. "Federal Government Gazette - Results of Contested Election and Statements of the Poll after the Official Addition of Votes, Parliamentary Constituencies for the State of Pahang [P.U. (B) 312/2018]" (PDF). Attorney General's Chambers of Malaysia. 28 May 2018.

Malaysian general election, 2013
Party	Candidate	Votes	%	∆%
PKR	Fauzi Abdul Rahman	30,584	56.81	▲5.48
BN	Adnan Wan Mamat	23,061	42.83	▼5.84
Independent	Ponusamy Govindasamy	193	0.36	▲0.36
Total valid votes		53,838	100.00	
Total rejected ballots		689		
Unreturned ballots		210		
Turnout		54,737	85.23	▲7.79
Registered electors		64,219		
Majority		7,523	13.98	▲1.32
PKR hold		Swing		
Source(s) "Federal Government Gazette - Notice of Contested Election, Parliament for the State of Pahang [P.U. (B) 175/2013]" (PDF). Attorney General's Chambers of Malaysia. 26 April 2013. "Federal Government Gazette - Results of Contested Election and Statements of the Poll after the Official Addition of Votes, Parliamentary Constituencies for the State of Pahang [P.U. (B) 216/2013]" (PDF). Attorney General's Chambers of Malaysia. 22 May 2013. Archived from the original (PDF) on 2019-07-01.

Malaysian general election, 2008
Party	Candidate	Votes	%	∆%
PKR	Azan Ismail	19,823	51.33	▲21.02
BN	Salamon Ali Rizal Abdul Rahman	18,796	48.67	▼21.02
Total valid votes		38,619	100.00	
Total rejected ballots		668		
Unreturned ballots		390		
Turnout		39,677	77.44	▼1.59
Registered electors		51,235		
Majority		1,027	2.66	▼36.72
PKR gain from BN		Swing		?

Malaysian general election, 2004
Party	Candidate	Votes	%
BN	Adnan Wan Mamat	25,177	69.69
PKR	Mohd Ramly @ Dzulkifli Ismail	10,948	30.31
Total valid votes		36,125	100.00
Total rejected ballots		801	
Unreturned ballots		370	
Turnout		37,296	78.59
Registered electors		47,456	
Majority		14,229	39.38
This was a new constituency created.
