= Azan Ismail =

Malaysian politician

- أذن إسماعيل

Member of the Terengganu State Legislative Assembly for Bandar
- In office 5 May 2013 – 9 May 2018
- Preceded by: Toh Chin Yaw (BN–MCA)
- Succeeded by: Ahmad Shah Muhamed (PAS)
- Majority: 2,159 (2013)

Member of the Malaysian Parliament for Indera Mahkota
- In office 8 March 2008 – 5 May 2013
- Preceded by: Adnan Wan Mamat (BN–UMNO)
- Succeeded by: Fauzi Abdul Rahman (PR–PKR)
- Majority: 1,027 (2008)

Personal details
- Born: Azan bin Ismail; 10 May 1965 (age 60) Terengganu, Malaysia
- Citizenship: Malaysian
- Party: People's Justice Party (PKR)
- Other political affiliations: Pakatan Rakyat (PR) (2008–2015); Pakatan Harapan (PH) (since 2015)
- Occupation: Politician

Azan bin Ismail (born 10 May 1965) is a Malaysian politician who served as a Member of the Terengganu State Legislative Assembly (MLA) for Bandar from May 2013 to May 2018 and as the Member of Parliament (MP) for Indera Mahkota from March 2008 to May 2013. He is a member of the People's Justice Party (PKR), a component party of the Pakatan Harapan (PH) and formerly Pakatan Rakyat (PR) coalitions.

Azan was elected to Parliament in the 2008 general election, defeating Salamon Ali Rizal Abdul Rahman of the governing Barisan Nasional (BN) coalition by 1,027 votes. He was a member of PKR's leadership in Pahang before resigning in 2010, citing dissatisfaction with PKR's management. He subsequently became the leader of PKR in the neighbouring state of Terengganu, and was elected to the State Assembly there, for the seat of Bandar, in the 2013 general election. His election unseated the incumbent BN assemblyman, Toh Chin Yaw, and was part of a swing to Pakatan Rakyat in the state that saw them win 15 of 32 assembly seats. Azan's move to Terengganu was carried out at the direction of PKR's national leader Anwar Ibrahim and involved Azan relinquishing renomination for his federal parliamentary seat.

In the 2018 general election, Azan failed to retain the Bandar state seat after he lost to Ahmad Shah Mohamed, from the Pan-Malaysian Islamic Party (PAS), in a three-corner fight with Toh Seng Cheng from the Malaysian Chinese Association (MCA) of BN.

== Election results ==
Parliament of Malaysia
Year	Constituency	Candidate	Votes	Pct	Opponent(s)	Votes	Pct	Ballots cast	Majority	Turnout
2008	P082 Indera Mahkota	Azan Ismail (PKR)	19,823	50.82%	Salamon Ali Rizal Abd Rahman (UMNO)	18,796	48.18%	39,677	1,027	77.44%
2023	P036 Kuala Terengganu	Azan Ismail (PKR)	21,103	23.59%	Ahmad Amzad Hashim (PAS)	68,369	76.41%	89,472	47,266	72.40%

Terengganu State Legislative Assembly
Year	Constituency	Candidate	Votes	Pct	Opponent(s)	Votes	Pct	Ballots cast	Majority	Turnout
2013	N14 Bandar	Azan Ismail (PKR)	9,413	56.34%	Toh Chin Yaw (MCA)	7,254	43.42%	16,983	2,159	83.29%
2018	N14 Bandar	Azan Ismail (PKR)	3,996	24.44%	Ahmad Shah Muhamed (PAS)	7,133	43.62%	16,353	2,091	80.68%
2018	N14 Bandar	Azan Ismail (PKR)	3,996	24.44%	Toh Seng Cheng (MCA)	5,042	30.83%	16,353	2,091	80.68%
