= Saifuddin Abdullah =

Malaysian politician

Yang Berhormat Dato' Sri Saifuddin Abdullah SSAP DSAP DPMP MP
- سيف الدين عبدالله
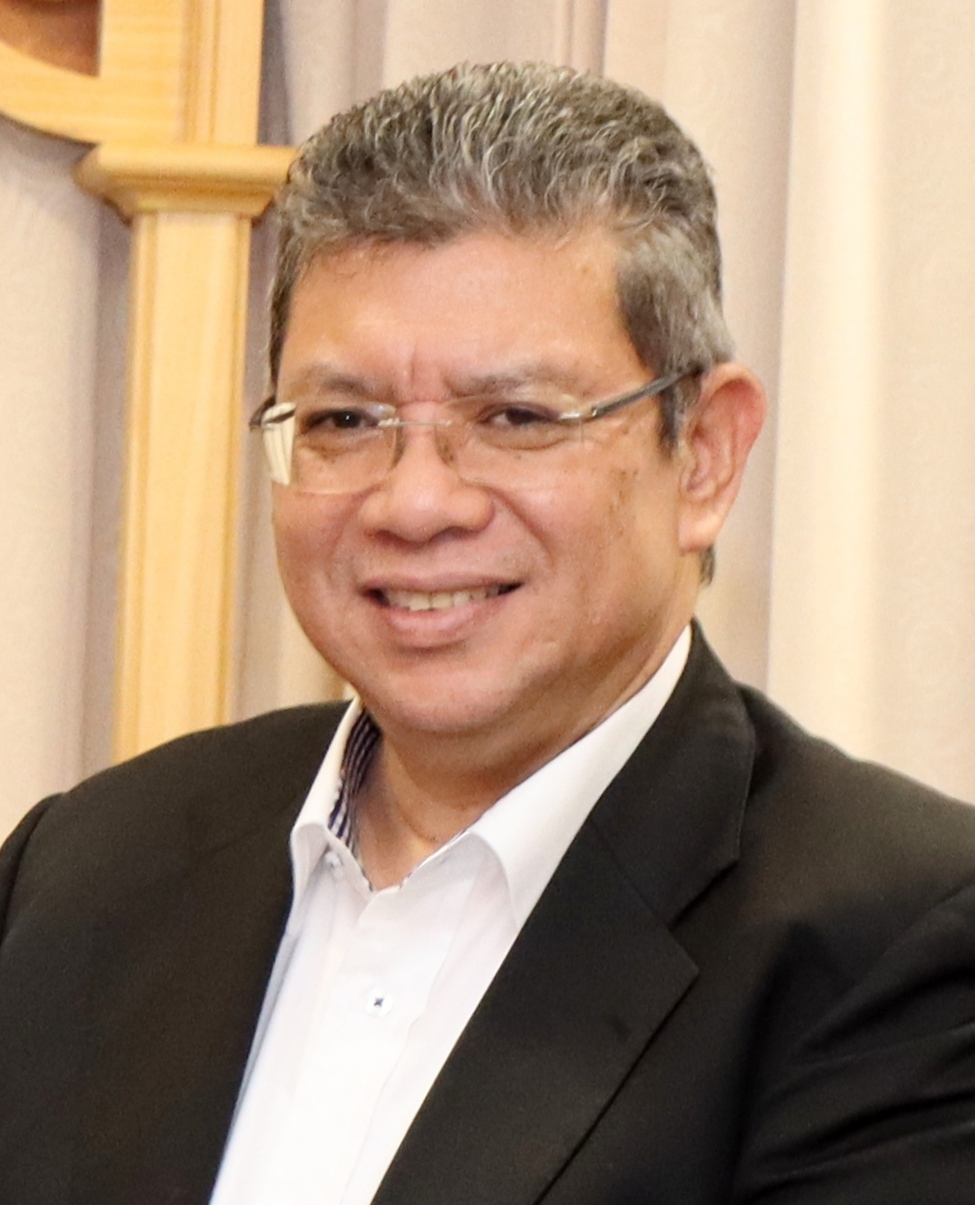
- Saifuddin in September 2020

Minister of Foreign Affairs
- In office 30 August 2021 – 24 November 2022
- Monarch: Abdullah
- Prime Minister: Ismail Sabri Yaakob
- Deputy: Kamarudin Jaffar
- Preceded by: Hishammuddin Hussein
- Succeeded by: Zambry Abdul Kadir
- Constituency: Indera Mahkota
- In office 2 July 2018 – 24 February 2020
- Monarchs: Muhammad V (2018–2019); Abdullah (2019–2020)
- Prime Minister: Mahathir Mohamad
- Deputy: Marzuki Yahya
- Preceded by: Anifah Aman
- Succeeded by: Hishammuddin Hussein
- Constituency: Indera Mahkota

Minister of Communications and Multimedia
- In office 10 March 2020 – 16 August 2021
- Monarch: Abdullah
- Prime Minister: Muhyiddin Yassin
- Deputy: Zahidi Zainul Abidin
- Preceded by: Gobind Singh Deo
- Succeeded by: Annuar Musa
- Constituency: Indera Mahkota

Deputy Minister of Higher Education II
- In office 10 April 2009 – 15 May 2013 Serving with Hou Kok Chung
- Monarchs: Mizan Zainal Abidin; Abdul Halim
- Prime Minister: Najib Razak
- Minister: Mohamed Khaled Nordin
- Preceded by: Idris Haron
- Succeeded by: Mary Yap Kain Ching (Deputy Minister of Education)
- Constituency: Temerloh

Deputy Minister of Entrepreneur and Co-operatives Development
- In office 19 March 2008 – 9 April 2009
- Monarch: Mizan Zainal Abidin
- Prime Minister: Abdullah Ahmad Badawi
- Minister: Noh Omar
- Preceded by: Khamsiyah Yeop
- Succeeded by: Tan Lian Hoe (Deputy Minister of Domestic Trade, Co-operatives and Consumerism)
- Constituency: Temerloh

Chief Secretary of Pakatan Harapan
- In office 19 October 2015 – 24 February 2020
- President: Wan Azizah Wan Ismail
- Leader: Anwar Ibrahim
- Chairman: Mahathir Mohamad
- Preceded by: Position established
- Succeeded by: Saifuddin Nasution Ismail
- Constituency: Indera Mahkota

Member of the Malaysian Parliament for Indera Mahkota
- Incumbent
- Assumed office 9 May 2018
- Preceded by: Fauzi Abdul Rahman (PR–PKR)
- Majority: 10,950 (2018); 8,399 (2022)

Member of the Malaysian Parliament for Temerloh
- In office 8 March 2008 – 5 May 2013
- Preceded by: Mohd Sarit Yusoh (BN–UMNO)
- Succeeded by: Nasrudin Hassan (PR–PAS)
- Majority: 2,441 (2008)

Faction represented in Dewan Rakyat
- 2008–2013: Barisan Nasional
- 2018–2020: Pakatan Harapan
- 2020: Malaysian United Indigenous Party
- 2020–2026: Perikatan Nasional

Personal details
- Born: Saifuddin bin Abdullah; 27 January 1961 (age 65) Mentakab, Pahang, Federation of Malaya
- Citizenship: Malaysia
- Party: United Malays National Organisation (UMNO) (?–2015); People's Justice Party (PKR) (2015–2020); Malaysian United Indigenous Party (BERSATU) (2020–2026); Independent (2026); Parti Wawasan Negara (WAWASAN) (2026–present)
- Other political affiliations: Barisan Nasional (BN) (?–2015); Pakatan Harapan (PH) (2015–2020); Perikatan Nasional (PN) (2020–present)
- Spouse: Norlin Shamsul Bahri
- Children: 1
- Education: University of Malaya
- Occupation: Politician
- Website: www.saifuddinabdullah.com.my
- Saifuddin Abdullah on Facebook; Saifuddin Abdullah on Parliament of Malaysia

Saifuddin bin Abdullah (Jawi: سيف الدين بن عبدالله; born 27 January 1961) is a Malaysian politician who has served as the Member of Parliament (MP) for Indera Mahkota since May 2018. He served as Minister of Foreign Affairs for the second term in the Barisan Nasional (BN) administration under former Prime Minister Ismail Sabri Yaakob from August 2021 to the collapse of the BN administration in November 2022 and the first term in the Pakatan Harapan (PH) administration under former Prime Minister Mahathir Mohamad from July 2018 to the collapse of the PN administration in February 2020, the Minister of Communications and Multimedia in the Perikatan Nasional (PN) administration under former Prime Minister Muhyiddin Yassin from March 2020 to the collapse of the PN administration in August 2021, Deputy Minister of Higher Education II and Deputy Minister of Entrepreneur and Co-operatives Development in the BN administration under former Prime Ministers Abdullah Ahmad Badawi and Najib Razak as well as former Ministers Noh Omar and Mohamed Khaled Nordin from March 2008 to May 2013 and MP for Temerloh from March 2008 to May 2013. He is also a member of the Malaysian United Indigenous Party (BERSATU), a component party of the PN coalition, was member of the People's Justice Party (PKR), a component party of the PH coalition and was member of the United Malays National Organisation (UMNO), a component party of the BN coalition. He is the State Chairman of BERSATU and PN of Pahang until 2025.

== Personal life ==
Saifuddin was born to an ustaz father and a schoolteacher mother in Temerloh near Mentakab, Pahang.

== Education ==
Saifuddin was educated at Sekolah Kebangsaan Abu Bakar Mentakab (1968–73), Malay College Kuala Kangsar - MCKK (1974–80), obtained BA Honors from University of Malaya (1984), Diploma in Translation from Malaysian Translator Association / Dewan Bahasa dan Pustaka (1985) and followed by the Executive Course at Harvard Business School (1995).

== Political career ==
Saifuddin was elected to Parliament in the 2008 election, and was immediately appointed a deputy minister, being cited as a future ministerial prospect. He had previously been the Secretary-General of the Malaysian Youth Council. After the election he was appointed a deputy minister, and was the Deputy Minister of Higher Education in Najib Razak's first term as Prime Minister. During his ministerial tenure, Saifuddin was one of the more moderate and liberal-progressive politicians in Najib's administration. He criticised his own government's handling of the Bersih 2.0 rally in 2011, in which over 1,600 protestors were arrested on the streets of Kuala Lumpur. In early 2013, he also stood up for a student who was humiliated by a government-linked panellist at a student forum at the Universiti Utara Malaysia (UUM).

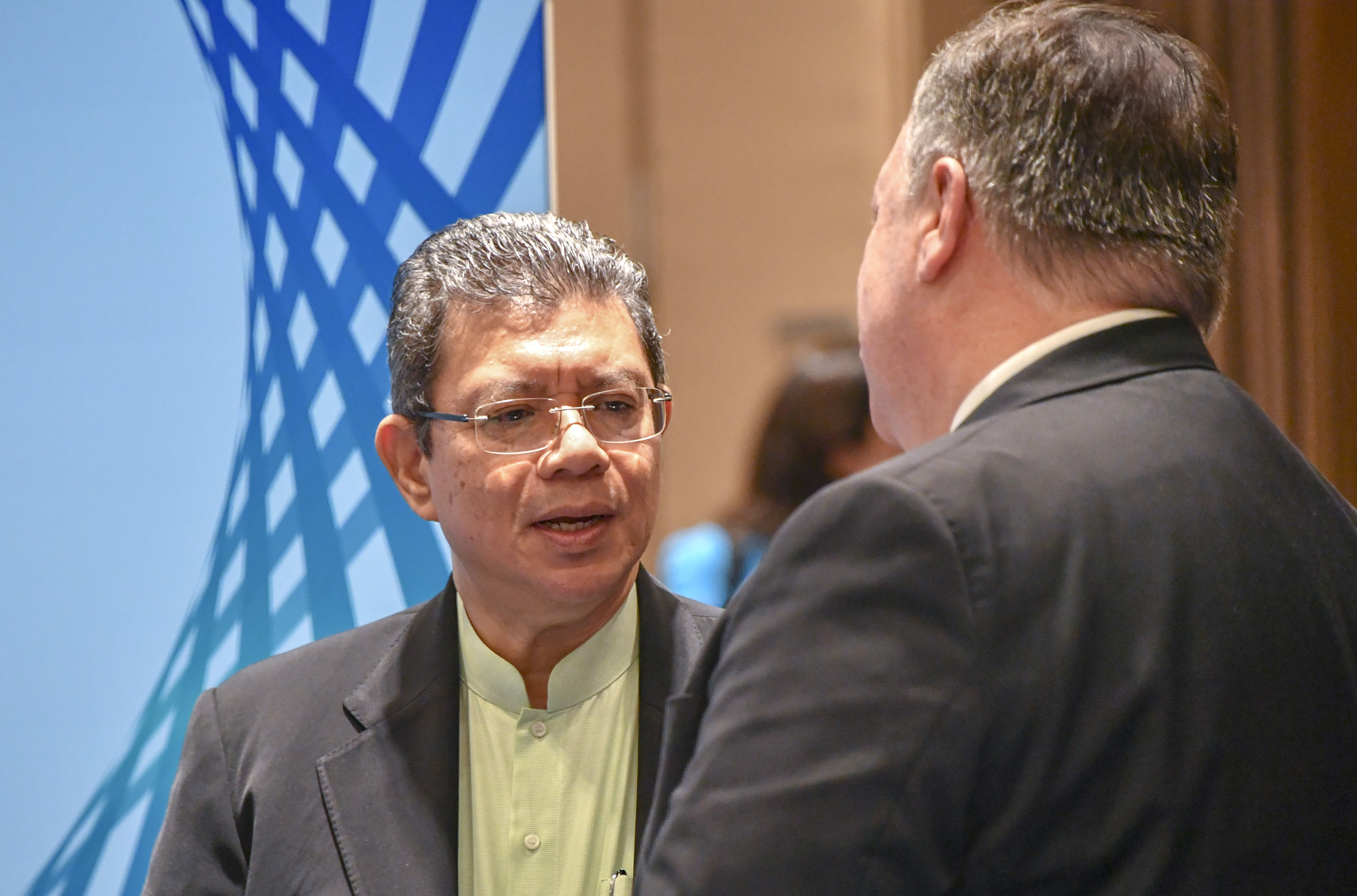
Saifuddin speaks with U.S. Secretary of State Michael R. Pompeo in Singapore on August 3, 2018.

Saifuddin's ministerial career was cut short by the 2013 election, when he lost his parliamentary seat to a Pan-Malaysian Islamic Party (PAS) candidate by 1,070 votes.

Saifuddin has written four books on Malaysian politics. After leaving Parliament he joined the University of Malaya as a research fellow, but in 2014, he resigned his position in protest when Malaysia's Education Ministry forced a well-respected professor at the university to resign, reportedly due to research findings critical of the government.

In 2015, Saifuddin quit UMNO and joined the People's Justice Party (PKR) over disagreements with the government's handling of the 1Malaysia Development Berhad scandal.

In the February 2020 political crisis dubbed "Sheraton Move", Saifuddin quit PKR along with deputy president Azmin Ali and 9 other MP's to form an independent parliamentary block.

== Health ==
In April 2021, he was tested positive for COVID-19 and was admitted in the Sungai Buloh Hospital. He was discharged from the hospital after his full recovery with 16 days of treatments.

== Election results ==
Parliament of Malaysia
Year	Constituency	Candidate	Votes	Pct	Opponent(s)	Votes	Pct	Ballots cast	Majority	Turnout
2008	P088 Temerloh	Saifuddin Abdullah (UMNO)	21,381	53.03%	Ahmad Nizam Hamid (PKR)	18,940	46.97%	41,463	2,441	76.77%
2013	P088 Temerloh	Saifuddin Abdullah (UMNO)	27,197	49.04%	Nasrudin Hassan (PAS)	28,267	50.96%	56,595	1,070	85.61%
2018	P082 Indera Mahkota	Saifuddin Abdullah (PKR)	28,578	44.85%	Johan Mat Sah (UMNO)	17,628	27.66%	64,612	10,950	83.70%
2018	P082 Indera Mahkota	Saifuddin Abdullah (PKR)	28,578	44.85%	Nasrudin Hassan (PAS)	17,515	27.49%	64,612	10,950	83.70%
2022	P082 Indera Mahkota	Saifuddin Abdullah (BERSATU)	41,692	44.65%	Zuraidi Ismail (PKR)	33,293	35.65%	93,379	8,399	77.46%
2022	P082 Indera Mahkota	Saifuddin Abdullah (BERSATU)	41,692	44.65%	Quek Tai Seong (MCA)	16,530	17.70%	93,379	8,399	77.46%
2022	P082 Indera Mahkota	Saifuddin Abdullah (BERSATU)	41,692	44.65%	Mohamad Nor Sundari (PEJUANG)	1,860	2.00%	93,379	8,399	77.46%

== Honours ==
=== Honours of Malaysia ===
- Malaysia
  - Recipient of the 17th Yang di-Pertuan Agong Installation Medal (2024)
- Pahang
  - Knight Grand Companion of the Order of Sultan Ahmad Shah of Pahang (SSAP) – Dato' Sri (2021)
  - Knight Companion of the Order of Sultan Ahmad Shah of Pahang (DSAP) – Dato' (2009)
- Perak
  - Knight Commander of the Order of the Perak State Crown (DPMP) – Dato' (2002)
