= Fuziah Salleh =

Malaysian politician

Yang Berhormat Senator Datuk Fuziah Salleh PGDK
- فوزية صالح
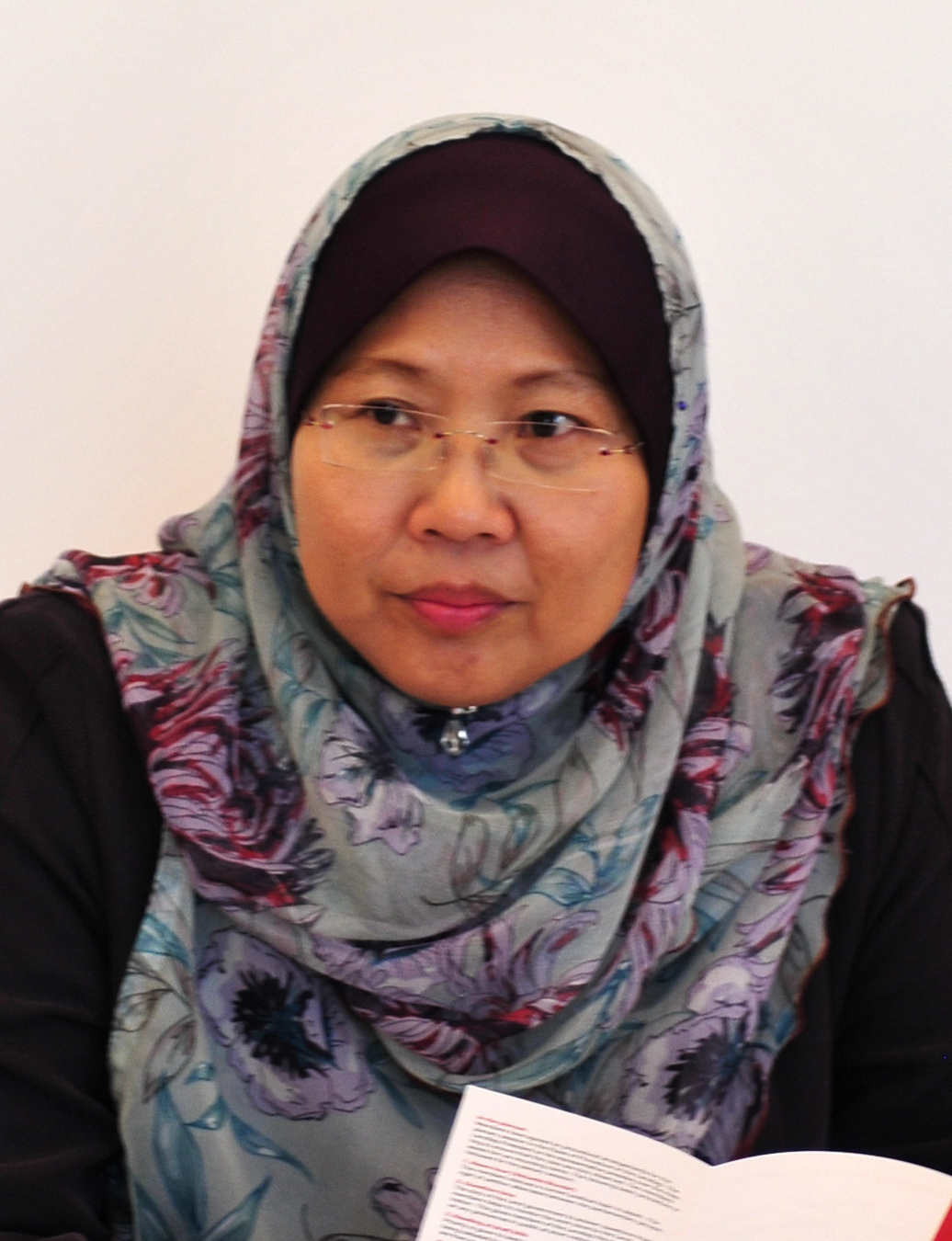
- Fuziah Salleh in 2014

Deputy Minister of Domestic Trade and Costs of Living
- Incumbent
- Assumed office 10 December 2022
- Monarchs: Abdullah (2022–2024); Ibrahim (since 2024)
- Prime Minister: Anwar Ibrahim
- Minister: Salahuddin Ayub (2022–2023); Armizan Mohd Ali (Acting, since 2023)
- Preceded by: Rosol Wahid (Deputy Minister of Domestic Trade and Consumer Affairs)
- Constituency: Senator

Deputy Minister in the Prime Minister's Department (Religious Affairs)
- In office 2 July 2018 – 24 February 2020
- Monarchs: Muhammad V (2018–2019); Abdullah (2019–2020)
- Prime Minister: Mahathir Mohamad
- Minister: Mujahid Yusof Rawa
- Preceded by: Asyraf Wajdi Dusuki
- Succeeded by: Ahmad Marzuk Shaary
- Constituency: Kuantan

Secretary General of the People's Justice Party
- Incumbent
- Assumed office 15 September 2024
- President: Anwar Ibrahim
- Preceded by: Saifuddin Nasution Ismail

State Chairperson of the People's Justice Party of Pahang
- In office 26 May 2024 – 15 September 2024
- President: Anwar Ibrahim
- Deputy: Rizal Jamin
- Preceded by: Amirudin Shari
- Succeeded by: Rizal Jamin

Women Chief of the People's Justice Party
- In office 11 July 2020 – 17 July 2022
- President: Anwar Ibrahim
- Deputy: Rodziah Ismail
- Preceded by: Haniza Mohamed Talha
- Succeeded by: Fadhlina Sidek

Vice President of the People's Justice Party
- In office 28 November 2010 – 20 August 2014 Serving with Nurul Izzah Anwar & Chua Tian Chang & Mansor Othman
- President: Wan Azizah Wan Ismail
- Preceded by: Azmin Ali
- Succeeded by: Rafizi Ramli

State Chairperson of Pakatan Harapan of Pahang
- Incumbent
- Assumed office 26 August 2024
- Chairman: Anwar Ibrahim
- Preceded by: Amirudin Shari
- In office 13 March 2019 – 6 September 2022
- Chairman: Mahathir Mohamad (2019–2020); Anwar Ibrahim (2020–2022)
- Preceded by: Fauzi Abdul Rahman
- Succeeded by: Amirudin Shari

Senator Appointed by the Yang di-Pertuan Agong
- Incumbent
- Assumed office 10 December 2022
- Monarchs: Abdullah (2022–2024); Ibrahim (since 2024)
- Prime Minister: Anwar Ibrahim

Member of the Malaysian Parliament for Kuantan
- In office 8 March 2008 – 19 November 2022
- Preceded by: Fu Ah Kiow (BN–MCA)
- Succeeded by: Wan Razali Wan Nor (PN–PAS)
- Majority: 1,826 (2008); 4,515 (2013); 8,111 (2018)

Personal details
- Born: Fuziah binti Salleh; 13 July 1959 (age 67) Johor, Federation of Malaya (now Malaysia)
- Party: People's Justice Party (PKR)
- Other political affiliations: Barisan Alternatif (BA) (1999–2004); Pakatan Rakyat (PR) (2008–2015); Pakatan Harapan (PH) (since 2015)
- Spouse: Russly Abdul Rahman
- Children: 2 sons and 4 daughters
- Education: University of Reading; University of Wales; Asia e University
- Occupation: Politician
- Website: fuziahsalleh.my

Fuziah binti Salleh (Jawi: فوزية بنت صالح; born on 13 July 1959) is a Malaysian politician who has served as the Deputy Minister of Domestic Trade and Costs of Living in the Unity Government administration under Prime Minister Anwar Ibrahim and Ministers Salahuddin Ayub and Armizan Mohd Ali as well as Senator since December 2022. She served as the Deputy Minister in the Prime Minister's Department in charge of religious affairs in the PH administration under former Prime Minister Mahathir Mohamad and former Minister Mujahid Yusof Rawa from July 2018 to the collapse of the PH administration in February 2020 and the Member of Parliament (MP) for Kuantan from March 2008 to November 2022. She is a member of the People's Justice Party (PKR), a component party of the PH coalition. She has also served as the Secretary-General of PKR since September 2024. She also served as the State Chairperson of PKR of Pahang from May 2024 to September 2024, Women Chief of PKR from July 2020 to July 2022 and Vice President of PKR from November 2010 to August 2014 as well as the State Chairperson of PH of Pahang from March 2019 to September 2022.

== Early life, academic qualifications and work experience ==
Fuziah Salleh was born in Johor, but grew up in Pahang. She had her early education at the Methodist Girls School in Kuantan. Fuziah went on to obtain a bachelor's degree in Counseling Psychology from the University of Reading, and followed by a Master of Business Administration (MBA) from the University of Wales in the United Kingdom (UK).

Fuziah is married to Russly Bin Abdul Rahman with six children.

Before entering politics, Fuziah was a corporate trainer and training consultant for multinationals, corporate institutions and NGOs in the area of human resource development and women's empowerment. She is experienced in counselling various interest groups in both the UK and Malaysia, ranging from youth, students, married couples, and women involved in domestic violence. In the mid-90s, she was attached to a state government institution as a counsellor and was also responsible for setting up a voluntary counselling unit, which is named Unit Kaunseling Islah JIM (1993) where she later became the advisor and trainer for the volunteers there.

== Political career ==
In the early stage of Reformasi movement in Malaysia, Fuziah Salleh was one of the leaders of an Islamic NGO, Jamaah Islah Malaysia (widely known as JIM) and also the "early bath group" joined National Justice Party (Malay: Parti Keadilan Nasional) which was established on 4 April 1999. National Justice Party was later merged with the older Malaysian People's Party (Malay: Parti Rakyat Malaysia) to establish the People's Justice Party (Malay: Parti Keadilan Rakyat) on 3 August 2003.

=== Positions in People's Justice Party (PKR) ===
- Secretary-General (since 15 September 2024)
- Pahang PKR Chief (26 May 2024 – 15 September 2024)
- Vice-President (28 November 2010 until 20 August 2014)
- Central Political Bureau Member (currently)
- Kuantan Division Chief (2002 until 2018)
- Pahang Election Director (Feb 2010 until December 2010)
- Pahang Training Director (April 2008 until January 2010)
- Pahang Deputy Election Director (Jun 2007 until May 2009)
- Pahang Women Chief (2000 until 2007)
- Started as Deputy National Women Chief when National Justice Party (KeADILan) was formed in 1999

=== Malaysian general election results ===
Fuziah Salleh ran unsuccessfully for Malaysian Parliament twice, before winning a parliament seat of Kuantan in the 12th General Election of Malaysia. On 8 March 2008, Fuziah successfully defeated incumbent Malaysian Chinese Association (MCA) heavyweight Datuk Fu Ah Kiow, who was also the incumbent Deputy Internal Security Minister.

In the 13th general election, MCA loaned the Kuantan parliamentary seat to the United Malays National Organisation (UMNO), to capitalise on the increase in Malay voters who now made up 63 per cent of Kuantan's over 55,000 voters. The Kuatan seat loan was also perceived as a tactical move by Barisan Nasional (BN) to counter the Chinese community still against the controversial Lynas rare earth plant in Kuantan. Despite facing stiff competition from UMNO, on 5 May 2013, PKR vice-president Fuziah Salleh not only retained the Kuantan seat for the second term but with an increased majority of 4,515 votes, after defeating Datuk Mohamed Suffian Awang. Datuk Mohamed Suffian Awang was Kuantan UMNO Youth Chief, and was also the Political Secretary to the BN chairman and the Prime Minister of Malaysia, Datuk Seri Mohammad Najib Abdul Razak.

Both UMNO and MCA are the major component parties of the BN ruling coalition.

=== Parliamentary representative ===
During her term as a parliamentary representative, Fuziah served in the following roles:

- committee member of ASEAN Inter Parliamentary Assembly (AIPA)
- Deputy Chairperson of the Women's Caucus in Parliament
- Pakatan Rakyat Committee on Environment

Fuziah spearheaded the "Stop Lynas Rare Earth Refinery" campaign in Kuantan. She initiated the civil society group "Concerned Citizen of Kuantan" to discuss actions to be taken by the Kuantan community against the Lynas rare earth refinery project. Fuziah led the local residents and environmentalists in petition collecting, PicBadging, leafleting, briefing and a civil protest movement.

On 2 May 2011, Fuziah presented the Lynas rare earth refinery case study that claimed far-reaching consequences on Kuantan communities' civil, political, economic, social and cultural rights, as well as the environment at the ASEAN Civil Society Conference/ASEAN Peoples' Forum in Jakarta, Indonesia.

=== Stop Lynas Rare Earth Refinery Campaign in Kuantan ===
Fuziah Salleh has spearheaded the "Stop Lynas Rare Earth Refinery" campaign in Kuantan after being elected as the Member of Parliament for Kuantan in 2008. Fuziah has been raising her concern over the risks of having Lynas Advanced Materials Plant (LAMP) near Kuantan in the Parliament of Malaysia since 18 November 2008.

"Concerned Citizen of Kuantan" was a civil society group initiated by Fuziah in December 2008 to discuss actions should be taken by the Kuantan community against the hazardous Lynas rare earth refinery project. Committee of "Concerned Citizen of Kuantan" was formed after a meeting held by Fuziah to discuss the LAMP issues with about 20 residents and professionals from different ethnic groups and NGOs near Kuantan. The awareness campaign about the hazardous LAMP organised between 2008 and 2010 was taxing with limited organisations and individuals willing to render assistance. Also, only the local Chinese media picked up the alleged LAMP issues, while both the English and Malay media didn't. In 2009, Fuziah's team managed to get media coverage of the LAMP problems in Kuantan via the Malaysian television channels, both the NTV7's and the TV2's Mandarin programs.

After fighting a solo battle for more than two years to stop the Lynas plant from being built in Malaysia. In early March 2011, public awareness has been heightened by the articles on the Lynas project published in the New York Times. At the same time, the Fukushima Daiichi nuclear disaster has ramped up fear in the Malaysian people about the risks of radioactive exposure. Since then, the "Stop Lynas Rare Earth Refinery" campaign has started to gain momentum.

The anti-Lynas group led by Fuziah Salleh had gradually evolved into a bigger civil society group, i.e. "Save Malaysia Stop Lynas" (SMSL). SMSL was initiated and loosely formed by Fuziah and her PKR team in March 2011, after a signature drive launched and public talk on the urgent need to cease the Lynas plant from commencing operations in Malaysia. Fuziah and team then passed their contacts to the SMSL committee with verbal agreement that all "Stop Lynas Rare Earth Refinery" NGOs, activists, professionals and experts to work together, and under the umbrella of Kuantan MP YB Fuziah Salleh. Along the path of her struggle against LAMP, various anti-Lynas groups, NGOs and NGIs have been mushrooming.

During the early days of the "Stop Lynas" campaign, Fuziah led the local residents and environmentalists in petition collecting, PicBadging, leafleting, briefing and a civil protest movement. The online portals and social media have played a significant role in keeping more people informed about the hazardous LAMP project in Gebeng, Kuantan.

On 2 May 2011, Fuziah presented the Lynas rare earth refinery case study that claimed far-reaching consequences on Kuantan communities' civil, political, economic, social and cultural rights, as well as the environment at the ASEAN Civil Society Conference/ASEAN Peoples' Forum in Jakarta, Indonesia.

In May 2011, the LAMP issues have started to attract more attentions from both the local and the international media – especially both Al-Jazeera 101 East and Australian Network Newsline broadcast programs observing the present situation of Kuantan's people over the Lynas project. This followed by the local television channel NTV7 Siasat Mandarin, which aired the updated LAMP issues on 9 June 2011 with Malay subtitle.

In July 2011, Fuziah also stepped up the campaign in Europe attempting to stop the Lynas rare earth refinery plant from operating in Malaysia, after completed her dialogue on ASEAN Women Leaders with European partners.

=== The International Atomic Energy Agency (IAEA) Review on Lynas ===
The government of Malaysia has bowed to public pressure in April 2011 and brought in the International Atomic Energy Agency (IAEA) to conduct a month-long review by a team of nine international experts on the construction of the Lynas rare earth refinery plant in Gebeng, Kuantan.

During the visit of the IAEA-led team to Kuantan, its meeting with stakeholders ended in chaos. Several anti-Lynas activists and journalists were injured and threatened, and 3 UMNO assemblymen from the Barisan Nasional ruling coalition even provoked PKR Kuantan MP Fuziah Salleh when she arrived on the scene of the IAEA review panel.

The review led by the IAEA panel concluded on 28 June 2011, and it claimed "was not able to identify any non-compliance with international radiation safety standards" by putting forward eleven recommendations for Lynas to meet before beginning operations, which have been adopted by the BN ruling coalition.

Despite the claimed hazards, the government of Malaysia is eager for investment by Lynas, even offering a 12-year tax holiday. Fuziah Salleh, local residents, environmentalists and professional bodies such as Malaysian Medical Association (MMA) and Malaysian Bar Council have questioned the credibility of the IAEA review. They have called for the LAMP to be scrapped by pointing out the IAEA review panel didn't include the medical experts and the IAEA report doesn't assure LAMP will be safe. Also, it is claimed that neither the long-term waste management nor the possible contamination of surface water and atmosphere by radioactive waste material were addressed in the radiological impact assessment (RIA) report. These worries have been further spurred by the New York Times article dated 29 June 2011, reporting the LAMP may be needed redesign work, with memos, e-mail messages and photos from Lynas and its contractors provided to the journalist by the engineers who worked at the LAMP.

Regardless of the criticisms, Putrajaya dismissed offhand this New York Times report without probing, and such flippant attitude of the Najib administration was slammed by Fuziah.

=== Anti-Lynas rally ===
- 30 March 2011 – A number of 100 residents nearby made the four-hour bus trip to Parliament House in Kuala Lumpur, to protest against the Lynas Advanced Materials Plant (LAMP) in Gebeng, Kuantan. The residents' representatives later held a press conference at the Parliament lobby, accompanied by Kuantan MP Fuziah Salleh to express their disagreement to the LAMP project and to promote a petition calling for a complete stop to the LAMP's construction. Press Conference of Fuziah Salleh outside the Australian High Commission (with Transcript)
- 20 May 2011 – Around 200 people made up of Fuziah Salleh and her anti-Lynas group Save Malaysia Stop Lynas (SMSL), Kuantan residents, NGO representatives and members of PKR and PAS attended the "Stop Lynas Solidarity Walk" from KLCC to the Australian high commission in Kuala Lumpur. Fuziah and the "selected" representatives submitted memorandum to the Australian high commissioner to protest against having a rare earth refinery plant in Gebeng, Kuantan.
- 26 February 2012 – 15,000 people were gathering at the Kuantan Municipal Council field for "Himpunan Hijau 2.0" (Anti-Lynas Green Rally 2.0). "Himpuanan Hijau 2.0" is a new group to oppose the construction of Lynas rare earth refinery in Gebeng, Kuantan, in which they fear will pose risks.
- 13 April 2012 – a new Anti-Lynas coalition, the Solidariti Hijau SeMalaysia – Stop Lynas (SHS-SL), comprising 23 NGOs, held an Anti-Lynas demonstrations nationwide outside "selected" mosques after Friday prayers. The SHS-SL rally was to protest against the newly established parliamentary select committee (PSC) on the Lynas refinery by the Malaysian government, and to "advise" the BN ruling coalition that the Lynas issue is of national interest regardless of race or religion.
- 28 April 2012 – "Himpunan Hijau 3.0" (Anti-Lynas Green Rally 3.0) supporters started marching from KLCC to join the "Berish 3.0" rally at Dataran Merdeka in Kuala Lumpur. The "Himpunan Hijau 3.0" rally was held together with the "Bersih 3.0" rally on 28 April 2012. "Berish 2.0" is a civil society group pushing for an overhaul to the Malaysian electoral system. Around 300,000 Malaysians had joined the "Berish 3.0" and "Himpunan Hijau 3.0" rally took the form of a sit-in ("duduk bantah" in Bahasa Malaysia), which taking place across Malaysia and spreading to over 80 cities across 35 countries where there were Malaysians.
- 23 June 2012 – About 300 anti-Lynas protesters attended the 24-hour Occupy Balok-Gebeng rally in Kuantan by planting banners at Balok beach. The organiser also placed around 15 coffins under a gigantic banner of Lynas, to be set on fire at the "Flame of Anger Rising- Burn Lynas into Ashes" session.
- 24 June 2012 – About 1,000 protesters converged at the entrance of the Gebeng Industrial Zone to protest against the Lynas rare earth refinery.
- 14 July 2012 – Some 26,000 people nationwide had participated in the mock voting campaign, "National Day of Stop Lynas Action" organised by SMSL in 19 cities and towns across Malaysia simultaneously. A total of 20,194 people voted against Lynas, while only 6 were in favour.
- 25 November 2012 – Started with about 70 participants on 13 Nov in the 13-day 300 km march from Kuantan to Kuala Lumpur to pressure the government to disallow the Lynas rare earth plant from operating and to highlight other environmental issues, by the time the marchers reached Dataran Merdeka, Kuala Lumpur on 25 Nov, an estimated 20,000 people had joined in the green march against Lynas.
- 12 January 2013 – An estimated 150,000 strong crowd at the People's Uprising Rally were in and outside Stadium Merdeka in Kuala Lumpur. The peaceful rally was to protest on a diverse range of issues, including to call for free and fair elections, to release Internal Security Act detainees, and to promote sustainable development such as to stop Lynas rare earth refinery plant from operating in Kuantan.

=== Kuantan Residents To Launch Legal Action Against Lynas ===
- 24 September 2011 – The Stop Lynas Coalition (SLC) comprised around 20 NGOs and groups was set up by Fuziah Salleh and team to join efforts in stopping Lynas Advanced Materials Plant (LAMP) operations.
- 17 February 2012 – The SLC and Kuantan residents filed an application for a judicial review of the temporary operating license (TOL) given to Lynas Malaysia Sdn Bhd by Atomic Energy Licensing Board's (AELB).
- 28 February 2012 – The SLC's and Kuantan residents’ case against Lynas was listed for mention in the Kuala Lumpur High Court.
- 30 March 2012 – Submissions for leave by the SLC and residents nearby for a judicial review of the Lynas operations in Gebeng, Kuantan. Justice Rohana Yusuf in chambers ordered AELB to reveal details of the TOL granted to Lynas by 4 April 2012.
- 4 April 2012 – The Kuala Lumpur High Court heard submissions from the Malaysian government and Lynas pertaining to preliminary objections of the SLC and residents in Gebeng, Kuantan.
- 12 April 2012 – Court case brought by the SLC and Kuantan residents was heard in "open court". The Kuala Lumpur High Court rejected the leave application for a judicial review against the AELB's approval of a TOL to Lynas Corporation to operate a rare earth refinery in Gebeng, Kuantan. Justice Rohana Yusuf declared the application filed by the Kuantan residents as "premature" on the following unusual circumstances:- (1) parliamentary select committee (PSC) was formed by the Malaysian government on 23 March to investigate the safety standards of the LAMP. (2) AELB had suspended the plant's TOL until all the disputes are settled. (3) The appeal by another anti-Lynas group, "Save Malaysia Stop Lynas" (SMSL) to the Science, Technology and Innovation Ministry (MOSTI) Minister, Datuk Seri Maximus Ongkili, to cancel the plant's licence may lead to embarrassment if the findings of MOSTI Minister differ from that of the court's.
- 9 May 2012 – The lawyer of the SLC and Kuantan residents applied seeking a fresh hearing by The Court of Appeal in Putrajaya.
- 10 September 2012 – The Court of Appeal dismissed SLC's and residents’ appeal of a Kuala Lumpur High Court decision on 12 April, where an application for judicial review of the AELB's decision to grant a TOL to Lynas for its rare earth plant in Kuantan was previously rejected. The lawyers of SLC indicated that they will appeal to the Federal Court.

=== Science, Technology And Innovation Ministry (MOSTI) on Lynas ===
- 17 April 2012 – Science, Technology and Innovation (MOSTI) Minister Datuk Seri Maximus Ongkili held a hearing on the appeal made by the Anti-Lynas group "Save Malaysia Stop Lynas" (SMSL) representatives, who claimed to be affected by the Atomic Energy Licensing Board's (AELB) 30 Jan decision to award a temporary operating licence (TOL) for the Lynas Advanced Materials Plant (LAMP)in Gebeng, Kuantan.
- 13 June 2012 – MOSTI had rejected the Kuantan residents' and SMSL's appeal to the ministry to suspend the TOL issued to the LAMP by the AELB. Maximus Ongkili said the government had told Lynas to submit a plan to immobilise radioactive elements in its waste, and to come up with an emergency response plan on dust control. However, Fuziah Salleh and the anti-Lynas activists unmoved by the added two extra conditions which to be met by Lynas.
- The Kuantan residents and SMSL said they would file a judicial review at the Kuantan High Court against the MOSTI Minister, on his decision to reject their appeal on the Lynas TOL.

=== Parliamentary Select Committee (PSC) on Lynas ===
- 17 March 2012. The BN ruling coalition (the federal government) announced it will set up a PSC to investigate and make recommendations on the Lynas issue.
- Both the ruling and opposition coalitions were invited to make up the PSC, and all interested parties (including the Anti-Lynas NGOs) were encouraged to attend.
- Fuziah, the PR opposition coalition and Anti-Lynas NGOs refused to participate by claiming PSC is merely a public relations attempt by the BN government to whitewash the Lynas project.

=== Lynas To Initiate Legal Action Against Malaysian Civilians ===
- 1 May 2012 – Rare earths miner Lynas sued a Malaysian community group "Save Malaysia Stop Lynas" (SMSL) and a Malaysian online portal because of an open letter published.
- 26 July 2012 – the Malaysian High Court decided against granting Lynas the defamation injunction. Lynas failed in its bid to gag Malaysian civilians from making public statements against it. The High Court awarded court costs of RM5,000 to SMSL against Lynas.
- 14 August 2012 – The Malaysian High Court fixed 26 September 2012 to hear an application by SMSL to transfer the Lynas defamation suit against it to the Kuantan High Court. Judge John Louis O’Hara would also hear another application by SMSL on the same day which seeks to obtain documents from Lynas which the Australian rare earth miner is declining to release.
- 10 July 2013 – Lynas Corporation has dropped its defamation suit against the SMSL at the Kuantan High Court without stating any reason for withdrawing the defamation suit. Justice Datuk Seri Mariana Yahya had informed Counsel representing SMSL, Datuk Bastian Vendargon that the amount of damages to be paid by Lynas to SMSL would be determined by the registrar.

==== SMSL counter sues Lynas ====
- 28 August 2012 – Kuantan High Court judge Justice Mariana Yahya has granted leave to SMSL to challenge the Atomic Energy Licensing Board (AELB)'s decision to grant a temporary operating licence (TOL) for the Lynas rare earth processing plant in Gebeng, Kuantan. Kuantan High Court has also allowed a judicial review of Science, Technology and Innovation (MOSTI) Minister Datuk Seri Maximus Ongkili's rejection of the SMSL's appeal against the TOL in June.
- 5 September 2012 – AELB has given the TOL for Lynas to operate its rare earth refinery in Gebeng, Kuantan, despite the Kuantan High Court's decision on 28 August.
- 25 September 2012 – The Kuantan High Court judge Mariana Yahya granted to SMSL the interim stay against Lynas Advanced Materials Plant's (LAMP's) TOL for 10 days until 4 October, so as to hear Lynas' application to intervene in the two judicial review cases against the TOL.
- 26 September 2012 – In ruling against Lynas Corporation, Kuala Lumpur High Court judge Datuk Louis O’Hara ruled to transfer Lynas’ defamation suit against Kuantan-based local environmental group SMSL to Kuantan, Pahang. He also rejected an application from Lynas to stay the transfer pending an appeal.
- 4 October 2012 – The Kuantan High Court kept on hold the license granted to Lynas' controversial rare earth plant near Kuantan by delaying until 10 October a decision on whether it would consider judicial reviews to permanently block production.
- 10 October 2012 – The Kuantan High Court continues to keep on hold a license granted to Lynas rare earth plant, delaying until November-8 a decision on whether it will consider judicial reviews aimed at permanently blocking production.
- 8 November 2012 – Kuantan High Court lifted the suspension on Lynas’ TOL to operate its controversial rare earth plant near Kuantan. However, SMSL will appeal the Kuantan High Court's decision trying to get the TOL suspended again.
- 14 November 2012 – The Kuantan High Court judge Mariana Yahya has rejected the application for an Erinford injunction by SMSL to freeze the issuance of the TOL to Lynas Advanced Material Plant (LAMP) near Kuantan.
- 7 December 2012 – The Court of Appeal in Putrajaya has fixed 19 Dec to hear the appeal by the Kuantan residents and SMSL for a permanent stay in their bid to stop the operation of the controversial Lynas rare earth plant until the residents' judicial review application is disposed of. The hearing of the judicial review application to quash the decision of AELB and MOSTI to issue TOL to LAMP, was fixed on 5 February 2013, before the Kuantan High Court.
- 19 December 2012 – the Kuantan residents and SMSL had appealed against an earlier decision to grant Lynas a temporary operating licence, the Court of Appeal in Putrajaya dismissed the appeal with costs in favour of Lynas. However, the legal process is not over, with a judicial review of the Lynas' operations to be heard by the Kuantan High Court on 5 February 2013.
- 29 January 2013 – the judge rejected the leave application of the Kuantan residents and SMSL to challenge the government's decision to issue a TOL to LAMP on two reasons, their lack of legal standing and the late filing of the application.
- 22 April 2013 – the Federal Court's five-member bench disallowed the Kuantan residents and SMSL to appeal to it against a high court's refusal to grant them the stay order to temporarily suspend LAMP's TOL pending the hearing of their judicial review.

=== Full operating license granted ===
On 2 September 2014, Lynas was issued a 2-year Full Operating Stage License (FOSL) by the Malaysian Atomic Energy Licensing Board (AELB)

== Election results ==
Parliament of Malaysia
Year	Constituency	Candidate	Votes	Pct	Opponent(s)	Votes	Pct	Ballots cast	Majority	Turnout
1999	P083 Kuantan	Fuziah Salleh (KeADILan)	21,136	42.60%	Mohd Khalil Yaakob (UMNO)	28,497	57.40%	52,308	7,343	74.26%
2004	P083 Kuantan	Fuziah Salleh (PKR)	12,177	36.35%	Fu Ah Kiow (MCA)	21,324	63.65%	34,290	9,147	74.65%
2008	P083 Kuantan	Fuziah Salleh (PKR)	18,398	52.61%	Fu Ah Kiow (MCA)	16,572	47.39%	35,772	1,826	74.54%
2013	P083 Kuantan	Fuziah Salleh (PKR)	25,834	54.79%	Mohamed Suffian Awang (UMNO)	21,319	45.21%	47,858	4,515	85.04%
2018	P083 Kuantan	Fuziah Salleh (PKR)	22,807	44.57%	Sulaiman Md Derus (PAS)	14,696	28.72%	52,167	8,111	83.21%
2018	P083 Kuantan	Fuziah Salleh (PKR)	22,807	44.57%	Wong Kean Hwee (MCA)	13,667	26.71%	52,167	8,111	83.21%
2022	P083 Kuantan	Fuziah Salleh (PKR)	22,648	33.42%	Wan Razali Wan Nor (PAS)	25,514	37.65%	68,515	2,866	78.22%
2022	P083 Kuantan	Fuziah Salleh (PKR)	22,648	33.42%	Ab Hamid Mohd Nazahar (UMNO)	19,114	28.27%	68,515	2,866	78.22%
2022	P083 Kuantan	Fuziah Salleh (PKR)	22,648	33.42%	Anuar Tajuddin (PEJUANG)	486	0.72%	68,515	2,866	78.22%

== Honours ==
- Malaysia
  - Recipient of the 17th Yang di-Pertuan Agong Installation Medal
- Sabah
  - Commander of the Order of Kinabalu (PGDK) – Datuk (2025)
