= Jamaah Islah Malaysia =

Jamaah Islah Malaysia جماعه اصلاح مليسيا JIM
- Founded: 27 July 1990; 5 Muharam 1411H
- Founder: Hj. Saari Sungib
- Type: NGO
- Purpose: Islam
- Location(s): Lot 300.3, Lorong Selangor, Pusat Bandar Melawati, 53100 Kuala Lumpur, Malaysia
- Key people: Hj. Zaid bin Kamaruddin (Presiden)
- Website: www.jim.org.my

Pertubuhan Jamaah Islah Malaysia (widely known as JIM) is an NGO (Non-Governmental Organization) in Malaysia. The organisation was officially registered on Friday 27 July 1990 (5 Muharram 1411 of the Islamic calendar) when its registration was accepted by The Registrar of Society, Malaysia. Its women wing, Wanita JIM, was established in 1993.

Today, JIM has 14 state and 54 district branches, with its headquarters in Melawati City Centre, Kuala Lumpur. It has more than 8,000 members all over Malaysia.

JIM's motto is "Bersama Islam Membina Masyarakat", which literally means "(Together) With Islam (We Are) Building Society".

== History ==
=== The Pioneers ===
Hj. Saari Sungib (who was also known as "Abu 'Urwah" was the chairman for the Sponsorship Committee of JIM's establishment. He then became the first president of JIM. Abu 'Urwah held the post of presidency for 10 years starting from 1990 until 1999.

Among the early leadership of JIM were, Ustaz Alias Osman, Shari Bahri, Zaid Kamaruddin, Dr. Mohamed Hatta Shaharom, Dr. Sahrim Ahmad, Kamaliah Nordin and Aliza Jaafar.

Fuziah Salleh was the first Head of JIM's Women wing from 1993 to 1999. Fuziah together with a few other Women activists of JIM had founded this institution. During the early years of JIM, the Women's wing were led by Rawiyah Zakaria, Norainee Kamaruddin, Salwani Mohd Daud and Wan Zarina Wan Zakaria.

== JIM's Da'wah Operations ==
=== Phase 1 (1991-1995) ===
At this stage, To JIM, in uplifting Islam in Malaysia, it has to begin from what is available to the Muslims in the country. Their ethos is that "One valuable asset is the Malay supremacy (ketuanan Melayu)".

As such, the transformation process, from the current situation to an Islamic one, is believed to have happened in a harmonious way, without disturbing the stability of the status quo (Saari Sungib 1995). Such a process is termed by JIM as homeostasis, a process that originated from the French scientist Claude Bernard to mean, in the social reformation domain, a transformation process that does not change the fundamental strength in the system (Saari Sungib 1997:28) "To us, it means struggling from within the existing socio-economic and political framework."

But JIM insists that by adopting the homeostasis approach, it means struggling along the Malaysian mainstream based on what it terms asislah (reformation) and tadrij (stages). By islah it means launching reformation programmes at all levels, be it at the national, institutional or infrastructural levels and systems. It involves the continuing education process and the involvementin raising the consciousness and practice of the Malaysian society in activities related to Islamic principles and values that fulfil the objective of the social reformation. By tadrij it means endeavouring a change in Acts and the Federal Constitution as well as the enforcement of civil law towards absolute justice, which naturally will eventually move towards the law of Shariah (Saari Sungib 1995). JIM firmly believes that through such an approach, Malaysia will become an Islamic state in 2010 at the latest, that is ten years earlier than the governments target for a developed, industrial nation as envisaged in the nations Vision 2020. For the above reasons, JIM is not keen in transforming Malaysia into an Islamic state.

To JIM, as long as the country is being ruled and administered by the Malay supremacy that respects Islam, the question of establishing an Islamic state is no more important. It is from 'respecting Islam, JIM believes, that reformation and improvement towards 'upholding Islam will happen. Thus, if the Malays are already having a strong influence in leadership and governance, it must not be disturbed and challenged (Saari Sungib 1996:45), hence JIMs non-confrontational approach.

== Dissolution ==
JIM was finally dissolved after 22 years to merge with Pertubuhan IKRAM Malaysia (IKRAM).
