= Ahmad Shah Muhamed =

Malaysian politician

Yang Berhormat Tuan Ahmad Shah Muhamed SMT AMT MLA
- أحمد شاه بن محمد

Deputy Member of the Terengganu State Executive Council
- Incumbent
- Assumed office 10 May 2018 (Local Government, Housing, Health and Environment)
- Monarch: Mizan Zainal Abidin
- Menteri Besar: Ahmad Samsuri Mokhtar
- Member: Alias Razak
- Preceded by: Position established
- Constituency: Bandar

Member of the Terengganu State Legislative Assembly for Bandar
- Incumbent
- Assumed office 9 May 2018
- Preceded by: Azan Ismail (PR–PKR)
- Majority: 2,091 (2018); 2,364 (2023)

Faction represented in Terengganu State Legislative Assembly
- 2018–2020: Malaysian Islamic Party
- 2020–: Perikatan Nasional

Personal details
- Born: Ahmad Shah bin Muhamed; 8 June 1968 (age 57) Terengganu, Malaysia
- Citizenship: Malaysian
- Party: Malaysian Islamic Party (PAS)
- Other political affiliations: Perikatan Nasional (PN); Gagasan Sejahtera (GS)
- Occupation: Politician

Ahmad Shah bin Muhamed (born 8 June 1968) is a Malaysian politician who has served as Deputy Member of the Terengganu State Executive Council (EXCO) in the Perikatan Nasional (PN) state administration under Menteri Besar Ahmad Samsuri Mokhtar and Member Alias Razak as well as Member of the Terengganu State Legislative Assembly (MLA) for Bandar since May 2018. He is a member of the Malaysian Islamic Party (PAS), a component party of the PN coalition.

== Election results ==
Terengganu State Legislative Assembly
Year	Constituency	Candidate	Votes	Pct	Opponent(s)	Votes	Pct	Ballots cast	Majority	Turnout
2018	N14 Bandar	Ahmad Shah Muhamed (PAS)	7,133	44.11%	Toh Seng Cheng (MCA)	5,042	31.18%	16,353	2,091	80.70%
2018	N14 Bandar	Ahmad Shah Muhamed (PAS)	7,133	44.11%	Azan Ismail (PKR)	3,996	24.71%	16,353	2,091	80.70%
2023	N14 Bandar	Ahmad Shah Muhamed (PAS)	8,438	56.69%	Armi Irzan Mohd (UMNO)	6,074	40.81%	15,007	2,364	68.04%
2023	N14 Bandar	Ahmad Shah Muhamed (PAS)	8,438	56.69%	Luqman Long (MUDA)	372	2.50%	15,007	2,364	68.04%

== Honours ==
- Terengganu
  - Companion of the Order of the Crown of Terengganu (SMT) (2025)
  - Member of the Order of the Crown of Terengganu (AMT) (2023)
