= Wan Razali Wan Nor =

Malaysian politician

Yang Berhormat Tuan Wan Razali Wan Nor MP
- وان غزالي وان نور

Member of the Malaysian Parliament for Kuantan
- Incumbent
- Assumed office 19 November 2022
- Preceded by: Fuziah Salleh (PH–PKR)
- Majority: 2,866 (2022)

Faction represented in the Dewan Rakyat
- 2022–: Perikatan Nasional

Personal details
- Born: Wan Razali bin Wan Nor
- Party: Malaysian Islamic Party (PAS)
- Other political affiliations: Perikatan Nasional (PN)
- Occupation: Politician
- Wan Razali Wan Nor on Facebook

Wan Razali bin Wan Nor is a Malaysian politician who has served as the Member of Parliament (MP) for Kuantan since November 2022. He is a member of the Malaysian Islamic Party (PAS), a component party of the Perikatan Nasional (PN) coalition.

== Political career ==
=== Member of Parliament (since 2022) ===
==== 2022 general election ====
In the 2022 general election, Wan Razali made his electoral debut after being nominated by PN to contest for the Kuantan federal seat. He won the seat and was elected to Parliament as the Kuantan MP after defeating defending MP Fuziah Salleh of Pakatan Harapan (PH), Ab Hamid Mohd Nazahar of Barisan Nasional (BN) and Anuar Tajuddin of Gerakan Tanah Air (GTA) by a majority of 2,866 votes. In response to his election as the Kuantan MP, he got emotional and added that PN worked very hard to win the seat.

== Controversies and issues ==
=== Comments on the uniforms of nurses ===
On 15 June 2023, Wan Razali made controversial comments on the uniforms of nurses in government hospitals and clinics when debating the White Paper on Public Health Reforms in Parliament. He called on the government to change the uniforms of nurses as they are too tight and not Syariah-complaint. He said the body shapes of women are visible with the uniforms. His comments attracted widespread and sharp criticisms. He was criticised for missing the point and prioritising the uniforms instead of the welfare of the nurses. He was also demanded to apologise to all nurses. Among the critics are Minister of Health Zaliha Mustafa, Minister of Local Government Development Nga Kor Ming, former Deputy Minister of Health Lee Boon Chye, President of the Congress of Unions of Employees in the Public and Civil Services (CUEPACS) Adnan Mat, President of the Malaysian Nurses Union (MNU) Nor Hayati Abdul Rashid and President of the Malaysian Medical Association (MMA) Muruga Raj Rajathurai. They stressed that there was no problems and issues with the uniforms as they are functional, practical, comfortable, decent and adhere to the guidelines of the Ministry of Health.

== Election results ==
Parliament of Malaysia
Year	Constituency	Candidate	Votes	Pct	Opponent(s)	Votes	Pct	Ballots cast	Majority	Turnout
2022	P083 Kuantan	Wan Razali Wan Nor (PAS)	25,514	37.65%	Fuziah Salleh (PKR)	22,648	33.42%	67,762	2,866	78.22%
2022	P083 Kuantan	Wan Razali Wan Nor (PAS)	25,514	37.65%	Ab Hamid Mohd Nazahar (UMNO)	19,114	28.27%	67,762	2,866	78.22%
2022	P083 Kuantan	Wan Razali Wan Nor (PAS)	25,514	37.65%	Anuar Tajuddin (PEJUANG)	486	0.72%	67,762	2,866	78.22%

== Honours ==
=== Honours of Malaysia ===
- Malaysia
  - Recipient of the 17th Yang di-Pertuan Agong Installation Medal (2024)

== See also ==
- Kuantan (federal constituency)
- Malaysian Islamic Party
- Perikatan Nasional
- 2022 Malaysian general election
