= Abdul Rahim Abu Bakar =

Yang Hormat Dato' Abdul Rahim bin Abu Bakar DSAP, SMP (Pah); AMN

10th Menteri Besar of Pahang
- In office 19 July 1978 – 7 November 1981
- Monarch: Ahmad Shah
- Preceded by: Muhamad Jusoh
- Succeeded by: Abdul Rashid Abdul Rahman

Deputy Minister of Energy, Post and Telecommunications
- In office 1984–1986
- Preceded by: Clarence Elong Mansul
- Succeeded by: Zainal Abidin Zin

Member of the Malaysian Parliament for Kuantan
- In office 1982–1986
- Preceded by: Mohd Ali M. Shariff
- Succeeded by: Adam Abdul Kadir

Member of the Pahang State Legislative Assembly for Beserah
- In office 1978–1982
- Preceded by: Ismail Siabit
- Succeeded by: Latifah Abdul Ghaffar

Personal details
- Born: February 7, 1943 Beserah, Kuantan, Pahang
- Died: September 24, 2009 (aged 66) Kuala Lumpur, Malaysia
- Party: United Malays National Organization
- Other political affiliations: Barisan Nasional
- Spouse: Datin Rosnah Kamaruddin
- Children: 4
- Occupation: Politician

Dato' Abdul Rahim bin Abu Bakar, DSAP., SMP., AMN. (7 February 1943 - 24 September 2009) was a Malaysian politician.

== Early life ==
Born in Beserah, Kuantan, he was an alumnus of SMK Sultan Abu Bakar, a secondary school in Kuantan. He graduated from Universiti Malaya with a Bachelor in Ecomomics.

== Non-political career ==
After completing his studies at the University of Malaya, Abdul Rahim became the Assistant State Secretary of Pahang in 1966. Throughout his career, he held several positions, including chairman of the Kuantan Municipal Council, Assistant Secretary of the Ministry of Rural Development, and General Manager of the Pahang Economic Development Corporation.

Abdul Rahim was chairman of Majlis Amanah Rakyat (MARA) from 16 October 1982 until 16 Julai 1984. Abdul Rahim was also a staunch champion of the Malay language during his 16-year tenure as chairman of Dewan Bahasa dan Pustaka from 1986 to 2002.

In addition, Abdul Rahim became the President of the National Cooperative Organization of Malaysia Bhd (Angkasa) from January 2009 until his death. In the private sector, he served as Chairman of Shamelin Holding Sdn. Bhd. and Shamelin Cooperative Berhad from 1991 to 2009. Abdul Rahim was also instrumental in forming zakat collection agency Pusat Pungutan Zakat (PPZ) of Wilayah Persekutuan, and also one of the founders of Angkatan Belia Islam Malaysia (ABIM), a national Islamic youth organization.

== Political career ==
Abdul Rahim won the Beserah seat in the Pahang state election of 1978. After BN won in the 1978 state election which were held simultaneously with the 1978 Malaysian general election, he were appointed as the Menteri Besar of Pahang on 19 July 1978. He resigned from his position on 7 November 1981, on advice from then Prime Minister Mahathir Mohamad who were also the national chairman of BN and president of UMNO, in the midst of confidence crisis between Abdul Rahim and Sultan of Pahang.

Abdul Rahim did not defend his Beserah seat in the 1982 state election, instead contesting in parliamentary seat of Kuantan in the 1982 Malaysian general election. He won the seat defeating Lim Pan Chiang of DAP. He were appointed as Deputy Minister of Energy, Post and Telecommunications in a cabinet reshuffle of 1984, and holds the post until 1986. From 1986 to 1988, after not defending the Kuantan seat, he were appointed as Secretary of Dewan Negara.

In UMNO Abdul Rahim have been elected as Supreme Council member from 1980 until 1996.

== Personal life and death ==
He were married to Datin Rosnah Kamaruddin, and togeteher they have four children Roslina, Rosnit, Mohd Riza and Rosazreen.

Abdul Rahim died on 24 September 2009, at his residence in Jalan U Thant, Kuala Lumpur after suffering a heart attack.
