= Bandar (state constituency) =

Political subdivision in Malaysia

Bandar (N14)
Terengganu constituency

State constituency
- Legislature: Terengganu State Legislative Assembly
MLA
Ahmad Shah Muhamed
PN
- Constituency created: 1958
- First contested: 1959
- Last contested: 2023

Demographics
- Electors (2023): 22,057

N14 Bandar within Terengganu, as used for the 2023 state election

Bandar is a state constituency in Terengganu, Malaysia, that has been represented in the Terengganu State Legislative Assembly.

The state constituency was first contested in 1959 and is mandated to return a single Assemblyman to the Terengganu State Legislative Assembly under the first-past-the-post voting system.

== Demographics ==
Ethnic breakdown of Bandar's electorate as of 2023
1. Malay (66.6%)
2. Chinese (31.5%)
3. Indian (1.17%)
4. Other ethnicities (0.68%)

== History ==
=== Polling districts ===
According to the gazette issued on 30 March 2018, the Bandar constituency has a total of 9 polling districts.

State Constituency	Polling Districts	Code	Location
Bandar (N14)	Tok Ku	036/14/01	SK Pusat Chabang Tiga
Bandar (N14)	Cabang Tiga	036/14/02	SK Seri Nilam
Bandar (N14)	Hiliran Masjid	036/14/03	Pusat Pengajian Al-Quran Dan Fardu Ain Yayasan Islam Terengganu
Bandar (N14)	Losong Masjid	036/14/04	SK Losong
Bandar (N14)	Pulau Kambing	036/14/05	SMJK Chung Hwa Wei Sin; Dewan Projek Perumahan Rakyat (PPR) Hiliran
Bandar (N14)	Kampung Cina	036/14/06	Dewan Tunku Abdul Rahman
Bandar (N14)	Banggul	036/14/07	SK Paya Bunga
Bandar (N14)	Paya Bunga	036/14/08	SK Tengku Ampuan Mariam
Bandar (N14)	Tanjung	036/14/09	SMA Sultan Zainal Abidin

=== Representation history ===
Members of the Legislative Assembly for Bandar
Assembly	No	Years	Member	Party
Constituency created
1st	N10	1959–1964	Tan Eng Aun (陈荣安)	Alliance (MCA)
2nd	N10	1964–1969	Tan Eng Aun (陈荣安)	Alliance (MCA)
		1969–1971	Assembly dissolved	
3rd	N10	1971–1973	Toh Seng Chong (杜成聪)	Alliance (MCA)
3rd	N10	1973-1974	Toh Seng Chong (杜成聪)	BN (MCA)
4th	N17	1974–1978	Toh Seng Chong (杜成聪)	BN (MCA)
5th	N17	1978–1982	Tok Teng Sai (祝圣才)	BN (MCA)
6th	N17	1982–1986	Tok Teng Sai (祝圣才)	BN (MCA)
7th	N13	1986–1990	Tok Teng Sai (祝圣才)	BN (MCA)
8th	N13	1990–1995	Harun Jusoh	APU (PAS)
9th	N14	1995–1999	Wong Foon Meng (王茀明)	BN (MCA)
10th	N14	1999–2004	Md Azmi Lop Yusof	BA (PAS)
11th	N14	2004–2008	Toh Chin Yaw (杜振耀)	BN (MCA)
12th	N14	2008–2013	Toh Chin Yaw (杜振耀)	BN (MCA)
13th	N14	2013–2015	Azan Ismail	PR (PKR)
13th	N14	2015–2018	Azan Ismail	PH (PKR)
14th	N14	2018–2020	Ahmad Shah Muhamed	GS (PAS)
14th	N14	2020–2023	Ahmad Shah Muhamed	PN (PAS)
15th	N14	2023–present	Ahmad Shah Muhamed	PN (PAS)

== Election results ==
Terengganu state election, 2023
Party	Candidate	Votes	%	∆%
PAS	Ahmad Shah Muhamed	8,438	56.69	▲12.58
BN	Armi Irzan Mohd	6,074	40.81	▲9.63
MUDA	Luqman Long	372	2.50	▲2.50
Total valid votes		14,884	100.00	
Total rejected ballots		123		
Unreturned ballots		12		
Turnout		15,019	68.09	▼12.59
Registered electors		22,057		
Majority		2,364	15.88	▲2.95
PAS hold		Swing		

Terengganu state election, 2018
Party	Candidate	Votes	%	∆%
PAS	Ahmad Shah Muhamed	7,133	44.11	▲44.11
BN	Toh Seng Cheng	5,042	31.18	▼12.34
PKR	Azan Ismail	3,996	24.71	▼31.77
Total valid votes		16,171	100.00	
Total rejected ballots		181		
Unreturned ballots		1		
Turnout		16,353	80.68	▼2.61
Registered electors		20,268		
Majority		2,091	12.93	▼0.02
PAS gain from PKR		Swing		-

Terengganu state election, 2013
Party	Candidate	Votes	%	∆%
PKR	Azan Ismail	9,413	56.48	▲56.48
BN	Toh Chin Yaw	7,254	43.52	▼10.41
Total valid votes		16,667	100.00	
Total rejected ballots		276		
Unreturned ballots		40		
Turnout		16,983	83.29	▲5.39
Registered electors		20,390		
Majority		2,159	12.95	▲5.09
PKR gain from BN		Swing		-

Terengganu state election, 2008
Party	Candidate	Votes	%	∆%
BN	Toh Chin Yaw	7,831	53.93	▼1.49
PAS	Abdul Manaf Che Mat	6,689	46.07	▲46.07
Total valid votes		14,520	100.00	
Total rejected ballots		231		
Unreturned ballots		14		
Turnout		14,765	77.90	▼3.62
Registered electors		18,953		
Majority		1,142	7.87	▼2.98
BN hold		Swing		

Terengganu state election, 2004
Party	Candidate	Votes	%	∆%
BN	Toh Chin Yaw	8,236	55.42	▲8.07
PAS	Md. Azmi Lop Yusof	6,624	44.58	▼6.65
Total valid votes		14,860	100.00	
Total rejected ballots		171		
Unreturned ballots		0		
Turnout		15,031	81.52	▲7.13
Registered electors		18,438		
Majority		1,612	10.85	▲6.97
BN gain from PAS		Swing		-

Terengganu state election, 1999
Party	Candidate	Votes	%	∆%
PAS	Md. Azmi Lop Yusof	6,756	51.23	▲6.85
BN	Wong Foon Meng	6,245	47.35	▼8.26
Independent	Ng Chai Hing	187	1.42	▲1.42
Total valid votes		13,188	100.00	
Total rejected ballots		211		
Unreturned ballots		53		
Turnout		13,452	74.39	▼0.51
Registered electors		18,083		
Majority		511	3.87	▼7.36
PAS gain from BN		Swing		-

Terengganu state election, 1995
Party	Candidate	Votes	%	∆%
BN	Wong Foon Meng	6,970	55.62	▲17.05
PAS	Mustafa Ali	5,562	44.38	▼1.27
Total valid votes		12,532	100.00	
Total rejected ballots		254		
Unreturned ballots		37		
Turnout		12,823	74.91	▲1.55
Registered electors		17,119		
Majority		1,408	11.24	▲4.16
BN gain from PAS		Swing		-

Terengganu state election, 1990
Party	Candidate	Votes	%	∆%
PAS	Mohamed Jusoh	4,682	45.65	▲2.29
BN	Wong Foon Meng	3,956	38.57	▼18.06
DAP	Ng Chai Hing	1,519	14.81	▲14.81
Independent	Ghazali Mohamad	99	0.97	▲0.97
Total valid votes		10,256	100.00	
Total rejected ballots		262		
Unreturned ballots		23		
Turnout		10,541	73.36	▲2.85
Registered electors		14,369		
Majority		726	7.08	▼6.19
PAS gain from BN		Swing		-

Terengganu state election, 1986
Party	Candidate	Votes	%	∆%
BN	Tok Teng Sai	5,280	56.63	▲16.30
PAS	Mohd Abdul Wahid Endut	4,043	43.37	▲19.52
Total valid votes		9,323	100.00	
Total rejected ballots		262		
Unreturned ballots		0		
Turnout		9,585	70.51	▼5.36
Registered electors		13,593		
Majority		1,237	13.27	▼3.21
BN hold		Swing		

Terengganu state election, 1982
Party	Candidate	Votes	%	∆%
BN	Tok Teng Sai	4,064	40.33	▼7.56
PAS	Abd. Halim Mohd. Shafie	2,403	23.85	▲8.65
Independent	Wee Cheng Huat	2,101	20.85	▲20.85
Independent	Yusof Abdullah @ Yusof Albakri	814	8.08	▲8.08
Parti Sosialis Rakyat Malaysia	Mazlan @ Mahmud Embong	520	5.16	▼31.75
Independent	Ab. Ghani Mohd.	115	1.14	▲1.14
Independent	Mohamad Daham Sulaiman	60	0.60	▲0.60
Total valid votes		10,077	100.00	
Total rejected ballots		264		
Unreturned ballots		0		
Turnout		10,341	75.87	▲3.11
Registered electors		13,630		
Majority		1,661	16.48	▲5.50
BN hold		Swing		

Terengganu state election, 1978
Party	Candidate	Votes	%	∆%
BN	Tok Teng Sai	3,850	47.89	▼6.64
Parti Sosialis Rakyat Malaysia	Mazlan @ Mahmud Embong	2,967	36.91	▼8.57
PAS	Saja Udin Maaruff	1,222	15.20	▲15.20
Total valid votes		8,039	100.00	
Total rejected ballots		435		
Unreturned ballots		0		
Turnout		8,474	72.76	▲1.47
Registered electors		11,647		
Majority		883	10.98	▲1.93
BN hold		Swing		

Terengganu state election, 1974
Party	Candidate	Votes	%	∆%
BN	Toh Seng Chong	3,782	54.53	▲5.54
Parti Sosialis Rakyat Malaysia	Mazlan @ Mahmud Embong	3,154	45.47	▲45.47
Total valid votes		6,936	100.00	
Total rejected ballots		363		
Unreturned ballots		0		
Turnout		7,299	71.29	▲1.64
Registered electors		10,239		
Majority		628	9.05	▼9.26
BN gain from Alliance		Swing		-

Terengganu state election, 1969
Party	Candidate	Votes	%	∆%
Alliance	Toh Seng Chong	2,111	48.99	▼18.70
PMIP	Saja Udin Maaruff	1,322	30.68	▼1.63
PR	Tan Teng Beng	876	20.33	▲20.33
Total valid votes		4,309	100.00	
Total rejected ballots		225		
Unreturned ballots		0		
Turnout		4,534	69.65	▼5.19
Registered electors		6,510		
Majority		789	18.31	▼17.08
Alliance hold		Swing		

Terengganu state election, 1964
Party	Candidate	Votes	%	∆%
Alliance	Tan Eng Ann	2,703	67.69	▲13.54
PMIP	Abd. Rahman Mohamed Salleh	1,290	32.31	▲8.69
Total valid votes		3,993	100.00	
Total rejected ballots		268		
Unreturned ballots		0		
Turnout		4,261	74.83	▲7.73
Registered electors		5,694		
Majority		1,413	35.39	▲4.85
Alliance hold		Swing		

Terengganu state election, 1959
Party	Candidate	Votes	%
Alliance	Tan Eng Ann	1,628	54.16
PAS	Mohamed Chik	710	23.62
Independent	Harun Mohamed Hassan	668	22.22
Total valid votes		3,006	100.00
Total rejected ballots		45	
Unreturned ballots		0	
Turnout		3,051	67.10
Registered electors		4,547	
Majority		918	30.54
This was a new constituency created.
