= Toh Chin Yaw =

Malaysian politician (born 1955)

Yang Berbahagia Dato' Toh Chin Yaw DPMT PPN PJK
- 杜振耀

Member of the Terengganu State Executive Council
- In office 2004 – 5 May 2013 (Industry, Trade and Environment)
- Monarch: Mizan Zainal Abidin
- Deputy: Abd Halim Jusoh
- Menteri Besar: Idris Jusoh; Ahmad Said
- Constituency: Bandar

Member of the Terengganu State Legislative Assembly for Bandar
- In office 21 March 2004 – 5 May 2013
- Preceded by: Md Azmi Lop Yusof (BA–PAS)
- Succeeded by: Azan Ismail (PR–PKR)
- Majority: 1,612 (2004); 1,142 (2008)

Personal details
- Born: 18 June 1955 (age 70) Kuala Terengganu, Terengganu, Federation of Malaya
- Party: Malaysian Chinese Association (MCA)
- Other political affiliations: Barisan Nasional (BN)

Toh Chin Yaw (born 18 June 1955) is a Malaysian politician. He had served as a member of the Terengganu State Executive Council (EXCO) in the Barisan Nasional (BN) state administration under Menteri Besar Idris Jusoh and Ahmad Said as well as Member of the Terengganu State Legislative Assembly (MLA) for Bandar from March 2004 to May 2013. He is a member of the Malaysian Chinese Association (MCA), a component party of the BN coalition.

== Election results ==
Terengganu State Legislative Assembly
| Year | Constituency | Candidate | Votes | Pct | Opponent(s) | Votes | Pct | Ballots cast | Majority | Turnout |
|---|---|---|---|---|---|---|---|---|---|---|
| 2004 | N14 Bandar | Toh Chin Yaw (MCA) | 8,236 | 55.42% | Md Azmi Lop Yusof (PAS) | 6,624 | 44.58% | 15,031 | 1,612 | 81.52% |
| 2008 | N14 Bandar | Toh Chin Yaw (MCA) | 7,831 | 53.93% | Abdul Manaf Che Mat (PKR) | 6,689 | 46.07% | 14,765 | 1,142 | 77.90% |
| 2013 | N14 Bandar | Toh Chin Yaw (MCA) | 7,254 | 43.42% | Azan Ismail (PKR) | 9,413 | 56.34% | 16,983 | 2,159 | 83.29% |

== Honours ==
- Malaysia
  - Medal of the Order of the Defender of the Realm (PPN) (1997)
- Terengganu
  - Knight Commander of the Order of the Crown of Terengganu (DPMT) – Dato' (2011)
  - Recipient of the Meritorious Service Medal (PJK) (1991)
