= Lee Chean Chung =

Malaysian politician, activist and researcher (born 1981)

- 李健聪

Member of the Malaysian Parliament for Petaling Jaya
- In office 19 November 2022 – 2 October 2026
- Preceded by: Maria Chin Abdullah (PH–PKR)
- Majority: 50,575 (2022)

Member of the Pahang State Legislative Assembly for Semambu
- In office 5 May 2013 – 19 November 2022
- Preceded by: Pang Tsu Ming (BN–MCA)
- Succeeded by: Chan Chun Kuang (PH–PKR)
- Majority: 3,200 (2013); 5,511 (2018)

Communications Director of the People's Justice Party
- In office 20 July 2022 – 12 June 2026
- President: Anwar Ibrahim
- Preceded by: Fahmi Fadzil
- Succeeded by: Adam Adli

Treasurer-General of the People's Justice Party
- In office 28 December 2018 – 20 July 2022
- President: Anwar Ibrahim
- Preceded by: Tan Yee Kew
- Succeeded by: William Leong Jee Keen

Personal details
- Born: Lee Chean Chung; 11 April 1981 (age 45) Kuantan, Pahang, Malaysia
- Party: People's Justice Party (PKR) (2008–2026); BERSAMA (since 2026)
- Other political affiliations: Pakatan Rakyat (PR) (2008–2015); Pakatan Harapan (PH) (2015–2026)
- Children: 3
- Education: Multimedia University (MMU); National University of Singapore (NUS)
- Occupation: Politician; activist; researcher
- Website: https://pjlestari.com/
- Lee Chean Chung on Facebook

Lee Chean Chung (simplified Chinese: 李健聪; traditional Chinese: 李健聰; pinyin: Lǐ Jiàn Cōng; Jyutping: Lei5 Gin6 Cung1; Pe̍h-ōe-jī: Lí Kiān-chhong) is a Malaysian politician, activist and researcher who served as the Member of Parliament (MP) for Petaling Jaya from November 2022 to his resignation in October 2026 and Member of the Pahang State Legislative Assembly (MLA) for Semambu from May 2013 to November 2022. He is a member of the Malaysian United Party (BERSAMA) and was a member of the People's Justice Party (PKR), a component party of the Pakatan Harapan (PH) coalition. When his PKR membership was suspended for 3 years on 30 September 2026, it ultimately led him to leave the party five days later on 5 October 2026.

== Academic career ==
Lee's master thesis titled “GPS Taxi Dispatch System Based on A* Shortest Path Algorithm”, has been cited in several journal articles.

== Political career ==
=== Member of the Pahang State Legislative Assembly (2013–2022) ===
In the 2013 Pahang state election, Lee was nominated by his party to contest for the Semambu state seat. He won and was elected into the Pahang State Legislative Assembly as the Semambu MLA for the first term. He defeated defending MLA Pang Tsu Ming of Barisan Nasional (BN) and an independent candidate by a majority of 3,200 votes.

During debate on the Pahang 2014 state budget on 19 November 2013, Lee described the reported RM2.19 million surplus as a “false” surplus. When he refused to withdraw the remark, the assembly voted on 26 November to suspend him for the next two sittings under Standing Orders 36(4) and 36(6). On 29 August 2014, shortly after the second sitting had ended, the secretariat cancelled an earlier invitation for Lee to attend the state Merdeka Day rehearsal and celebration in Kuantan, citing the lapsed suspension, a move he condemned as an abuse of power.

In March 2015, Lee participated in the "Kita Lawan" ("We Fight") movement, which organized street protests calling for reforms and the release of opposition leader Datuk Seri Anwar Ibrahim. On September 8, 2015, he, along with other activists and opposition politicians, was charged under Section 4(2)(c) of the Peaceful Assembly Act 2012 for participating in a street protest that began in front of the Sogo Complex and ended at the fountain at the Jalan Tun Perak intersection on March 21, 2015. If convicted, the offense carries a maximum fine of RM10,000.

On 6 January 2017, Lee and Felda activist Razali Ithnin delivered a memorandum at Felda's Kuala Lumpur headquarters to protest the agency's plan to buy a 37 percent stake in Indonesia's PT Eagle High Plantations. After the event, both were summoned by police for questioning on 10 February 2017 under the Peaceful Assembly Act 2012. Lee contended that the brief hand-over outside the building did not constitute a public assembly.

In the 2018 Pahang state election, Lee was renominated by his party to defend the Semambu seat. He won again and was reelected as the Semambu MLA for the second term. He defeated candidates of BN and the Gagasan Sejahtera (GS) by the slightly bigger majority of 5,511 votes.

On 18 August 2019, Lee attended a Save Malaysia, Stop Lynas protest in Kuantan. Although organisers had given the police 18 days’ notice, the Kuantan Municipal Council did not issue venue approval, leading police to deem the gathering unauthorised. On 21 August he was among five individuals summoned by police for questioning over the event, clarifying that he had joined as a participant rather than an organiser.

In the 2022 Pahang State Legislative Assembly debate on the royal address, Lee made headlines by bringing a potted Chinese Goddess bamboo into the chamber, symbolising the value of ecological preservation. During the debate, He criticised the abuse of the forest plantation (Ladang Hutan) scheme as a cover for illegal logging. He revealed that out of the 73,360 hectares of land approved under the programme, only 5% had undergone replanting, resulting in widespread land degradation. He called on the government to table a white paper to investigate the link between these forest conversions and recurring floods, and further proposed amending state laws to impose harsher penalties on irresponsible loggers who exploit forests for profit.

In July 2022, Lee and several Parti Keadilan Rakyat (PKR) members organised a flash-mob protest in Kulai, Johor, highlighting surging living costs and calling for stronger anti-inflation measures. He was later summoned by police for questioning over his participation in the protest.

=== Member of Parliament (since 2022) ===
Lee moved to the federal politics and contested in the 2022 Malaysian general election for the Petaling Jaya seat. He defeated a total of five candidates by a majority of 50,575 votes.

In September 2024, Lee announced the launch of a cultural and culinary map of Petaling Jaya Old Town, aimed at attracting tourists and visitors to explore the area's local food, leisure spots, and cultural heritage. In collaboration with a group of volunteers, approximately 20,000 copies of the bilingual map were self-produced and printed for public distribution. The guide features 18 historical or cultural landmarks, 13 long-standing traditional businesses, and 18 local delicacies, and is available in three languages.

In March 2024, Lee secured funding through the Mesra Rakyat Programme (PMR) to upgrade the football field at Block C of Desa Ria Flats in Petaling Jaya. The completed facility now serves as a well-equipped recreational space for the local community.

In January 2025, Lee proposed several measures to improve public transport accessibility, including expanding the e-hailing network for vans and motorcycles, and enhancing pedestrian, bicycle, and e-scooter infrastructure to improve first- and last-mile connectivity.

In May 2025, with Lee's support, a pedestrian walkway to the MRT Phileo Damansara station was officially completed and opened. Funded with RM200,000 by the Petaling Jaya City Council (MBPJ), the walkway is expected to benefit between 5,000 and 8,000 commuters by providing a safer and more convenient route to the station, thereby encouraging greater public transport usage.

In December 2024, Lee launched the Free Milk Programme for Children from Low-Income Families, targeting malnutrition among children in his constituency. The pilot phase, launched at Desa Mentari Blocks 5 and 6, provides weekly milk supplies to 100 families with children aged 1 to 6. Lee expressed hope to expand the initiative to more communities, reaffirming his commitment to child health and welfare.

In 2024 and 2025, Lee actively advocated for the rights of stateless individuals in his constituency, helping 20 long-time applicants finally obtain their MyKad under the Madani government's inclusive policies.

In April 2025, Lee Chean Chung, MP for Petaling Jaya, proposed a revitalisation plan for Pasar Besar Jalan Othman to address declining foot traffic and support local economic recovery. Following consultations with hawkers, his parliamentary service centre submitted three main proposals to the Petaling Jaya City Council (MBPJ).

These included activating the underutilised second floor of the market by inviting young entrepreneurs—such as artisans, baristas, and bakers, to create a creative-traditional hybrid space; establishing a site management team comprising hawker representatives to oversee coordination and outreach; and forming a job-matching task force to address local unemployment while helping hawkers overcome labour shortages caused by restrictions on foreign workers.

== Election results ==
Pahang State Legislative Assembly
| Year | Constituency | Candidate | Votes | Pct | Opponent(s) | Votes | Pct | Ballot cast | Majority | Turnout |
|---|---|---|---|---|---|---|---|---|---|---|
| 2013 | N13 Semambu | Lee Chean Chung (PKR) | 14,753 | 54.26% | Pang Tsu Ming (MCA) | 11,553 | 42.49% | 27,624 | 3,200 | 84.91% |
| 2013 | N13 Semambu | Lee Chean Chung (PKR) | 14,753 | 54.26% | Mohd Shukri Mohd Ramli (IND) | 885 | 3.25% | 27,624 | 3,200 | 84.91% |
| 2018 | N13 Semambu | Lee Chean Chung (PKR) | 14,991 | 47.15% | Mohd Yusof Hashin (PAS) | 9,480 | 29.82% | 32,215 | 5,511 | 83.70% |
| 2018 | N13 Semambu | Lee Chean Chung (PKR) | 14,991 | 47.15% | Quek Tai Seong (MCA) | 7,323 | 23.03% | 32,215 | 5,511 | 83.70% |

Parliament of Malaysia
| Year | Constituency | | Votes | Pct | Opponent(s) | Votes | Pct | Ballots cast | Majority | Turnout |
|---|---|---|---|---|---|---|---|---|---|---|
| 2022 | P105 Petaling Jaya | Lee Chean Chung (PKR) | 83,311 | 57.12% | Theng Book (BERSATU) | 32,736 | 22.44% | 148,021 | 50,575 | 74.74% |
| 2022 | P105 Petaling Jaya | Lee Chean Chung (PKR) | 83,311 | 57.12% | Chew Hian Tat (MCA) | 23,253 | 15.94% | 148,021 | 50,575 | 74.74% |
| 2022 | P105 Petaling Jaya | Lee Chean Chung (PKR) | 83,311 | 57.12% | Mazween Mokhtar (PEJUANG) | 4,052 | 2.78% | 148,021 | 50,575 | 74.74% |
| 2022 | P105 Petaling Jaya | Lee Chean Chung (PKR) | 83,311 | 57.12% | Mohamad Ezam Mohd Nor (PRM) | 2,049 | 1.40% | 148,021 | 50,575 | 74.74% |
| 2022 | P105 Petaling Jaya | Lee Chean Chung (PKR) | 83,311 | 57.12% | KJ John (IND) | 461 | 0.32% | 148,021 | 50,575 | 74.74% |

== Bibliography ==
=== Books ===
- Green Political Reform 绿色政改 (2012) ISBN 978-967-0311-05-0
- Jiwa Merdeka, Himpunan Esei Pimpinan Muda KEADILAN (2015) ISBN 978-9671213216

=== Papers ===
- Net Zero Pathways for Malaysia (Phase II Interim Report), ASEAN Green Future, Sustainable Development Solutions Network, 2022
- “Institutions for Sustainability: Informal Settlers in the Philippines”, GSP Conference 2019: Urban Possibilities: Reimagining Philippines, 2019.
- “Revisiting Industrial Policy and Strategic Coupling Strategy Under the Era of Hyperglobalization”. The Asian Conference on the Social Sciences, 2019.
- “GPS taxi dispatch system based on A* shortest path algorithm”, 2015, Master's thesis submitted to the Department of Transportation and Logistics at Malaysia University of Science and Technology (MUST). Study was cited by Didi Research Institute, Didi AI Lab, British University in Dubai, University of Edinburgh, Shanghai Jiao Tong University, Wuhan University, Telecom ParisTech, and University of Tokyo.

=== Columns ===
- The Edge
- Malaysiakini 当今大马
- Oriental Daily 东方日报
- Contemporary Review 当代评论

== Honours ==
=== Honours of Malaysia ===
- Malaysia
  - Recipient of the 17th Yang di-Pertuan Agong Installation Medal (2024)
