= Semambu =

State constituency in Pahang, Malaysia

Semambu (N13)
Pahang constituency

State constituency
- Legislature: Pahang State Legislative Assembly
MLA
Chan Chun Kuang
PH
- Constituency created: 2003
- First contested: 2004
- Last contested: 2022

Demographics
- Electors (2022): 61,179

Semambu is a state constituency in Pahang, Malaysia, that has been represented in the Pahang State Legislative Assembly since 2004.

The state constituency was created in the 2003 redistribution and is mandated to return a single member to the Pahang State Legislative Assembly under the first past the post voting system.

== Demographics ==
Ethnic breakdown of Semambu's electorate as of 2022
1. Malay (60.9%)
2. Chinese (29.6%)
3. Indian (8.30%)
4. Other ethnicities (1.24%)

== History ==
2004–2016: The constituency contains the polling districts of RTP Bukit Goh, Kampung Padang, Bukit Istana, Semambu, Bukit Sekilau, Indera Mahkota 1, Bukit Ubi, Bukit Setongkol, Taman LKNP, Chenderawasih, Indera Mahkota 2.

2016–present: The constituency contains the polling districts of Kampung Padang, RTP Bukit Goh, Bukit Istana, Semambu, Bukit Sekilau, Indera Mahkota 1, Bukit Ubi, Bukit Setongkol, Taman LKNP, Chenderawasih, Indera Mahkota 2.

=== Polling districts ===
According to the federal gazette issued on 31 October 2022, the Semambu constituency is divided into 11 polling districts.

State constituency	Polling districts	Code	Location
Semambu (N13)	Kampung Padang	082/13/01	SK Kampong Padang
Semambu (N13)	Rtp Bukit Goh	082/13/02	SK Rtp Bukit Goh
Semambu (N13)	Bukit Istana	082/13/03	SK Sungai Talam
Semambu (N13)	Semambu	082/13/04	SK Semambu
Semambu (N13)	Bukit Sekilau	082/13/05	SK Bukit Sekilau; Kolej Universiti Yayasan Pahang; Tabika KEMAS kAMPUNG Bukit Sekilau
Semambu (N13)	Indera Mahkota 1	082/13/06	SMK Cenderawasih
Semambu (N13)	Bukit Ubi	082/13/07	Dewan Kelab Sukan Komuniti DUN Semambu
Semambu (N13)	Bukit Setongkol	082/13/08	SK Bukit Setongkol
Semambu (N13)	Taman LKNP	082/13/09	SJK (C) Chung Ching 2
Semambu (N13)	Chenderawasih	082/13/10	SK Cenderawasih; SA Rakyat (KAFA) Baitul Huda Cenderawasih
Semambu (N13)	Indera Mahkota 2	082/13/11	SMK Tengku Panglima Tengku Muhamad; SK Indera Mahkota

=== Representation history ===
Members of the Legislative Assembly for Semambu
Assembly	No	Years	Member	Party
Constituency created from Indera Mahkota and Beserah
11th	N13	2004–2008	Pang Tsu Ming (彭子明)	BN (MCA)
12th	N13	2008–2013	Pang Tsu Ming (彭子明)	BN (MCA)
13th	N13	2013–2018	Lee Chean Chung (李健聪)	PR (PKR)
14th	N13	2018–2022	Lee Chean Chung (李健聪)	PH (PKR)
15th	N13	2022–present	Chan Chun Kuang (陈俊广)	PH (PKR)

== Election results ==
Pahang state election, 2022: Semambu
Party	Candidate	Votes	%	∆%
PH	Chan Chun Kuang	18,902	40.01	▲40.01
PN	Zulfadli Zakariah	17,098	36.19	▲36.19
BN	Mohd Khairul Hisham Omar	10,422	22.06	▼0.97
PEJUANG	Rashidah Abdul Rahman	820	1.74	▲1.75
Total valid votes		47,242	100.00	
Total rejected ballots		405		
Unreturned ballots		76		
Turnout		47,723	78.01	▼5.69
Registered electors		61,179		
Majority		1,804	3.82	▼13.51
PH hold		Swing		

Pahang state election, 2018: Semambu
Party	Candidate	Votes	%	∆%
PKR	Lee Chean Chung	14,991	47.15	▼7.11
PAS	Mohd Yusof Hashin	9,480	29.82	▲29.82
BN	Quek Tai Seong	7,323	23.03	▼19.46
Total valid votes		31,794	100.00	
Total rejected ballots		307		
Unreturned ballots		114		
Turnout		32,215	83.70	▼1.21
Registered electors		38.487		
Majority		5,511	17.33	▲5.56
PKR hold		Swing		

Pahang state election, 2013: Semambu
Party	Candidate	Votes	%	∆%
PKR	Lee Chean Chung	14,753	54.26	▲10.04
BN	Pang Tsu Ming	11,553	42.49	▼13.29
Independent	Mohd Shukri Mohd Ramli	885	3.25	▲3.25
Total valid votes		27,191	100.00	
Total rejected ballots		327		
Unreturned ballots		106		
Turnout		27,624	84.91	▲9.20
Registered electors		32,534		
Majority		3,200	11.77	▲0.21
PKR gain from BN		Swing		?
Source(s) "Federal Government Gazette – Notice of Contested Election, State Legislative Assembly for the State of Pahang [P.U. (B) 191/2013]" (PDF). Attorney General's Chambers of Malaysia. 26 April 2013. "Federal Government Gazette – Results of Contested Election and Statements of the Poll after the Official Addition of Votes, State Constituencies for the State of Pahang [P.U. (B) 232/2013]" (PDF). Attorney General's Chambers of Malaysia. 22 May 2013.

Pahang state election, 2008: Semambu
Party	Candidate	Votes	%	∆%
BN	Pang Tsu Ming	10,300	55.78	▼11.61
PKR	Nancy Khong Saw Gek	8,164	44.22	▲11.61
Total valid votes		18,464	100.00	
Total rejected ballots		619		
Unreturned ballots		167		
Turnout		19,250	75.71	▼1.92
Registered electors		25,427		
Majority		2,136	11.56	▼23.20
BN hold		Swing		

Pahang state election, 2004: Semambu
Party	Candidate	Votes	%
BN	Pang Tsu Ming	11,110	67.39
PKR	Mohd Zukri Aksah	5,375	32.61
Total valid votes		16,485	100.00
Total rejected ballots		337	
Unreturned ballots		352	
Turnout		17,174	77.63
Registered electors		22,124	
Majority		5,735	34.78
This was a new constituency created.
