= Kuantan (federal constituency) =

Federal constituency of Pahang, Malaysia

Kuantan (P083)
Pahang constituency

Federal constituency
- Legislature: Dewan Rakyat
- MP: Wan Razali Wan Nor; PN
- Constituency created: 1958
- First contested: 1959
- Last contested: 2022

Demographics
- Population (2020): 128,247
- Electors (2022): 87,597
- Area (km²): 165
- Pop. density (per km²): 777.3

Kuantan is a federal constituency in Kuantan District, in Pahang, Malaysia, that has been represented in the Dewan Rakyat since 1959.

The federal constituency was created in the 1958 redistribution and is mandated to return a single member to the Dewan Rakyat under the first-past-the-post voting system.

== Demographics ==
https://live.chinapress.com.my/ge15/parliament/PAHANG

Ethnic breakdown of Kuantan's electorate as of 2022
1. Malay (70.3%)
2. Chinese (26.2%)
3. Indian (3.10%)
4. Other ethnicities (0.40%)

As of 2020, Kuantan has a population of 128,247 people.

Age breakdown of Kuantan's electorate as of 2022
1. 18-20 (6.51%)
2. 21-29 (21.7%)
3. 30-39 (21.8%)
4. 40-49 (16.0%)
5. 50-59 (14.5%)
6. 60-69 (11.7%)
7. 70-79 (5.58%)
8. 80-89 (1.73%)
9. above 90 (0.38%)
Gender breakdown of Kuantan's electorate as of 2022
1. Male (50.4%)
2. Female (49.6%)

== History ==
=== Polling districts ===
According to the federal gazette issued on 31 October 2022, the Kuantan constituency is divided into 25 polling districts.

State constituency	Polling district	Code	Location
Teruntum (N14)	Seri Kuantan	083/14/01	SK Galing
Teruntum (N14)	Perkampungan Teratai	083/14/02	SMK Alor Akar
Teruntum (N14)	Medan Tok Sira	083/14/03	SMK Tok Sera
Teruntum (N14)	Kubang Buaya	083/14/04	MRSM Kuantan
Teruntum (N14)	Kampung Selamat	083/14/05	SMA Al-Ihsan Kuantan
Teruntum (N14)	Bandar Kuantan	083/14/06	SK (P) Methodist Kuantan
Teruntum (N14)	Seri Teruntum	083/14/07	Pejabat Pendidikan Daerah Kuantan
Teruntum (N14)	Kampung Jawa	083/14/08	SK Sultan Abdullah
Teruntum (N14)	Seri Belian	083/14/09	SK Teruntum
Teruntum (N14)	Lapang Besar	083/14/10	SMK (P) Methodist Kuantan
Tanjung Lumpur (N15)	Medan Warisan	083/15/01	SJK (C) Chung Ching
Tanjung Lumpur (N15)	Medan Makmur	083/15/02	SMK Tanah Putih
Tanjung Lumpur (N15)	Seri Kemunting	083/15/03	Dewan Jabatan Pengairan Dan Saliran Daerah Kuantan
Tanjung Lumpur (N15)	Tanjung Lumpur	083/15/04	SK Tanjung Lumpur
Tanjung Lumpur (N15)	Kempadang	083/15/05	SK Kempadang; SJK (C) Pooi Ming
Tanjung Lumpur (N15)	Kampung Peramu	083/15/06	SMK Tanjung Lumpur
Tanjung Lumpur (N15)	Tanah Putih Baru	083/15/07	SK Tanah Putih Baru
Tanjung Lumpur (N15)	Sungai Isap Murni	083/15/08	SK Sungai Isap Murni
Tanjung Lumpur (N15)	Sungai Isap	083/15/09	SK Sungai Isap
Inderapura (N16)	Kampung Belukar	083/16/01	SK Kampung Belukar; Dewan PM Najib
Inderapura (N16)	Kuala Penor	083/16/02	SK Kuala Penor
Inderapura (N16)	Cherok Paloh	083/16/03	SK Cherok Paloh
Inderapura (N16)	Ubai	083/16/04	SK Ubai
Inderapura (N16)	Kampung Pahang	083/16/05	Pusat Latihan Pertanian Inderapura; SK Bunut Rendang
Inderapura (N16)	Taman Guru	083/16/06	SMK Paya Besar; Kolej Poly-Tech MARA (KPTM) Kuantan

=== Representation history ===
Members of Parliament for Kuantan
Parliament	No	Years	Member	Party	Vote Share
Constituency created from Pahang Timor
Parliament of the Federation of Malaya
1st	P061	1959–1963	Abdul Rahman Talib (عبدالرحمن طالب)	Alliance (UMNO)	8,856; 76.25%
Parliament of Malaysia
1st	P061	1963–1964	Abdul Rahman Talib (عبدالرحمن طالب)	Alliance (UMNO)	8,856; 76.25%
2nd	P061	1964–1968	Abdul Rahman Talib (عبدالرحمن طالب)	Alliance (UMNO)	10,696; 69.42%
2nd	P061	1968–1969	Mohamed Taib (محمد طائب)	Alliance (UMNO)	Uncontested
		1969–1971	Parliament was suspended		
3rd	P061	1971–1973	Mohamed Taib (محمد طائب)	Alliance (UMNO)	8,798; 44.60%
3rd	P061	1973–1974	Mohamed Taib (محمد طائب)	BN (UMNO)	8,798; 44.60%
4th	P067	1974–1978	Mohd Ali M. Shariff (محمد علي م. شريف)	BN (UMNO)	12,371; 62.84%
5th	P067	1978–1982	Mohd Ali M. Shariff (محمد علي م. شريف)	BN (UMNO)	16.568; 60.10%
6th	P067	1982–1986	Abdul Rahim Abu Bakar (عبدالرحيم ابو بكر)	BN (UMNO)	20,444; 62.21%
7th	P075	1986–1990	Adam Abdul Kadir (آدم عبدالقادر)	BN (UMNO)	20,943; 58.80%
8th	P075	1990–1995	Fauzi Abdul Rahman (فوزي بن عبدالرحمن)	BN (UMNO)	25,020; 56.64%
9th	P078	1995–1999	Fauzi Abdul Rahman (فوزي بن عبدالرحمن)	BN (UMNO)	33,718; 76.04%
10th	P078	1999–2004	Mohd Khalil Yaakob (محمد خليل يعقوب)	BN (UMNO)	28,479; 57.40%
11th	P083	2004–2008	Fu Ah Kiow (胡亚桥)	BN (MCA)	21,324; 63.65%
12th	P083	2008–2013	Fuziah Salleh (فوزية صالح)	PR (PKR)	18,398; 52.61%
13th	P083	2013–2015	Fuziah Salleh (فوزية صالح)	PR (PKR)	25,834; 54.79%
13th	P083	2015–2018	Fuziah Salleh (فوزية صالح)	PH (PKR)	25,834; 54.79%
14th	P083	2018–2022	Fuziah Salleh (فوزية صالح)	PH (PKR)	22,807; 44.57%
15th	P083	2022–present	Wan Razali Wan Nor (وان غزالي وان نور)	PN (PAS)	25,514; 37.65%

=== State constituency ===
Parliamentary constituency	State constituency						
Parliamentary constituency	1955–59*	1959–1974	1974–1986	1986–1995	1995–2004	2004–2018	2018–present
Kuantan			Bandar Kuantan				
Kuantan		Beserah					
Kuantan					Indera Mahkota		
Kuantan						Inderapura	
Kuantan			Sungei Lembing				
Kuantan		Tanah Puteh					
Kuantan						Tanjung Lumpur	
Kuantan		Telok Sisek					
Kuantan				Teruntum			
Kuantan		Ulu Kuantan					

=== Historical boundaries ===
State Constituency	Area					
State Constituency	1959	1974	1984	1994	2003	2018
Bandar Kuantan		Bukit Ubi; Kampung Kubang Buaya; Kuantan; Tanjung Lumpur; Teruntum				
Beserah	Balok; Beserah; Cherating; FELDA Bukit Goh 1 & 2; Gebeng	Balok; Beserah; Cherating; Gebeng; Teluk Cempedak				
Indera Mahkota				Bukit Setongkol; Bukit Ubi; Indera Mahkota; Semambu; Taman Cenderawasih		
Inderapura					Cherok Paloh; Inderapura; Kampung Belukar; Kampung Ubai; Kuala Penor	
Sungei Lembing		Bukit Setongkol; FELDA Bukit Sagu 1 & 2; Indera Mahkota; Semambu; Sungai Lembing				
Tanah Puteh	Bukit Setongkol; Bukit Ubi; Kuantan; Taman Cenderawasih; Tanah Puteh					
Tanjung Lumpur					Kampung Pak Mahat; Kempadang; Seri Kemunting; Sungai Isap; Tanjung Lumpur	
Telok Sisek	Kampung Kubang Buaya; Sungai Soi; Tanjung Lumpur; Teluk Cempedak; Teluk Sisek					
Teruntum			Bukit Ubi; Kampung Kubang Buaya; Kuantan; Tanjung Lumpur; Teruntum	Kampung Kubang Buaya; Kemunting; Kuantan; Tanjung Lumpur; Teruntum	Kampung Kubang Buaya; Kampung Selamat; Kuantan; Teluk Cempedak; Teruntum	
Ulu Kuantan	Bukit Rangin; Gambang; Jaya Gading; Seri Mahkota; Sungai Lembing					

=== Current state assembly members ===
No.	State Constituency	Member	Coalition (Party)
N14	Teruntum	Sim Chon Siang	PH (PKR)
N15	Tanjung Lumpur	Rosli Abdul Jabar	PN (PAS)
N16	Inderapura	Shafik Fauzan Sharif	BN (UMNO)

=== Local governments & postcodes ===
No.	State Constituency	Local Government	Postcode
N14	Teruntum	Kuantan City Council	25000, 25050, 25100, 25150, 25200, 25250, 25300, 25503, 25506, 25520, 26060 Kuantan
N15	Tanjung Lumpur	Kuantan City Council	25000, 25050, 25100, 25150, 25200, 25250, 25300, 25503, 25506, 25520, 26060 Kuantan
N16	Inderapura	Kuantan City Council	25000, 25050, 25100, 25150, 25200, 25250, 25300, 25503, 25506, 25520, 26060 Kuantan

== Election results ==
Malaysian general election, 2022
Party	Candidate	Votes	%	∆%
PN	Wan Razali Wan Nor	25,514	37.65	▲37.65
PH	Fuziah Salleh	22,648	33.42	▼11.15
BN	Ab Hamid Mohd Nazahar	19,114	28.27	▲1.56
GTA	Anuar Tajuddin	486	0.72	▲0.72
Total valid votes		67,762	100.00	
Total rejected ballots		631		
Unreturned ballots		122		
Turnout		68,515	78.22	▼4.99
Registered electors		87,957		
Majority		2,866	4.23	▼11.62
PN gain from PKR		Swing		?
Source(s) https://lom.agc.gov.my/ilims/upload/portal/akta/outputp/1753278/PUB611_2022.pdf

Malaysian general election, 2018
Party	Candidate	Votes	%	∆%
PKR	Fuziah Salleh	22,807	44.57	▲44.57
PAS	Sulaiman Md Derus	14,696	27.72	▲27.72
BN	Wong Kean Hwee	13,667	26.71	▼18.50
Total valid votes		51,170	100.00	
Total rejected ballots		798		
Unreturned ballots		199		
Turnout		52,167	83.21	▼1.83
Registered electors		62,696		
Majority		8,111	15.85	▲9.27
PKR hold		Swing		
Source(s) "His Majesty's Government Gazette - Notice of Contested Election, Parliament for the State of Pahang [P.U. (B) 238/2018]" (PDF). Attorney General's Chambers of Malaysia. 3 May 2018. "Federal Government Gazette - Results of Contested Election and Statements of the Poll after the Official Addition of Votes, Parliamentary Constituencies for the State of Pahang [P.U. (B) 312/2018]" (PDF). Attorney General's Chambers of Malaysia. 28 May 2018.

Malaysian general election, 2013
Party	Candidate	Votes	%	∆%
PKR	Fuziah Salleh	25,834	54.79	▲2.18
BN	Mohamed Suffian Awang	21,319	45.21	▼2.18
Total valid votes		47,153	100.00	
Total rejected ballots		570		
Unreturned ballots		135		
Turnout		47,858	85.04	▲10.12
Registered electors		56,280		
Majority		4,515	9.58	▲4.36
PKR hold		Swing		
Source(s) "Federal Government Gazette - Notice of Contested Election, Parliament for the State of Pahang [P.U. (B) 175/2013]" (PDF). Attorney General's Chambers of Malaysia. 26 April 2013. "Federal Government Gazette - Results of Contested Election and Statements of the Poll after the Official Addition of Votes, Parliamentary Constituencies for the State of Pahang [P.U. (B) 216/2013]" (PDF). Attorney General's Chambers of Malaysia. 22 May 2013. Archived from the original (PDF) on 2019-07-01.

Malaysian general election, 2008
Party	Candidate	Votes	%	∆%
PKR	Fuziah Salleh	18,398	52.61	▲16.26
BN	Fu Ah Kiow @ Oh (Fu) Soon Guan	16,572	47.39	▼16.26
Total valid votes		34,970	100.00	
Total rejected ballots		623		
Unreturned ballots		179		
Turnout		35,772	74.92	▲0.27
Registered electors		47,745		
Majority		1,826	5.22	▼22.08
PKR gain from BN		Swing		?

Malaysian general election, 2004
Party	Candidate	Votes	%	∆%
BN	Fu Ah Kiow @ Oh (Fu) Soon Guan	21,324	63.65	▲6.25
PKR	Fuziah Salleh	12,177	36.35	▼6.25
Total valid votes		33,501	100.00	
Total rejected ballots		543		
Unreturned ballots		246		
Turnout		34,290	74.65	▲0.39
Registered electors		45,934		
Majority		9,147	27.30	▲12.50
BN hold		Swing		

Malaysian general election, 1999
Party	Candidate	Votes	%	∆%
BN	Mohd Khalil Yaakob	28,479	57.40	▼18.64
PKR	Fuziah Salleh	21,136	42.60	▲42.60
Total valid votes		49,615	100.00	
Total rejected ballots		1,037		
Unreturned ballots		1,656		
Turnout		52,308	74.26	▲1.82
Registered electors		70,438		
Majority		7,343	14.80	▼37.28
BN hold		Swing		

Malaysian general election, 1995
Party	Candidate	Votes	%	∆%
BN	Fauzi Abdul Rahman	33,718	76.04	▲19.40
S46	Noorsiah Tuajib	10,622	23.96	▼19.40
Total valid votes		44,340	100.00	
Total rejected ballots		1,784		
Unreturned ballots		1,423		
Turnout		47,547	72.44	▲1.20
Registered electors		65,636		
Majority		23,096	52.08	▲38.80
BN hold		Swing		

Malaysian general election, 1990
Party	Candidate	Votes	%	∆%
BN	Fauzi Abdul Rahman	25,020	56.64	▼2.16
S46	Ahmad Mokhtar Mohamed	19,153	43.36	▲43.36
Total valid votes		44,173	100.00	
Total rejected ballots		1,282		
Unreturned ballots		0		
Turnout		45,455	71.24	▲4.48
Registered electors		63,807		
Majority		5,867	13.28	▼19.46
BN hold		Swing		

Malaysian general election, 1986
Party	Candidate	Votes	%	∆%
BN	Adam Abdul Kadir	20,943	58.80	▼3.41
DAP	Syed Ali Mohsin	9,283	26.06	▼1.40
PAS	Syed Noh Syed Mohamed	5,390	15.13	▲15.13
Total valid votes		35,616	100.00	
Total rejected ballots		832		
Unreturned ballots		0		
Turnout		36,448	66.76	▼4.77
Registered electors		54,595		
Majority		11,660	32.74	▼2.01
BN hold		Swing		

Malaysian general election, 1982
Party	Candidate	Votes	%	∆%
BN	Abdul Rahim Abu Bakar	20,444	62.21	▲2.11
DAP	Lim Pan Chiang	9,022	27.46	▲17.82
PAS	Tengku Ali Shahdan Tengku Endut	3,395	10.33	▲10.33
Total valid votes		32,861	100.00	
Total rejected ballots		856		
Unreturned ballots		0		
Turnout		33,717	71.53	▼2.62
Registered electors		47,137		
Majority		11,422	34.75	▼1.99
BN hold		Swing		

Malaysian general election, 1978
Party	Candidate	Votes	%	∆%
BN	Mohd Ali M. Shariff	16,568	60.10	▼2.74
Parti Rakyat Malaysia	Dzulkifli Ismail	6,441	23.36	▲0.02
DAP	Jaafar Hussin	2,659	9.64	▲9.64
PAS	Zabidin Rahmat	1,901	6.90	▲6.90
Total valid votes		27,569	100.00	
Total rejected ballots		778		
Unreturned ballots		0		
Turnout		28,347	74.15	▼0.26
Registered electors		38,229		
Majority		10,127	36.74	▼2.76
BN hold		Swing		

Malaysian general election, 1974
Party	Candidate	Votes	%	∆%
BN	Mohd Ali M. Shariff	12,371	62.84	▲62.84
Parti Rakyat Malaysia	S. Sivasubramaniam	4,595	23.34	▼14.63
Independent	Chin Jeck Soon	2,721	13.82	▲13.82
Total valid votes		19,687	100.00	
Total rejected ballots		998		
Unreturned ballots		0		
Turnout		20,685	74.41	▲5.64
Registered electors		27,800		
Majority		7,776	39.50	▲32.87
BN hold		Swing		

Malaysian general election, 1969
Party	Candidate	Votes	%	∆%
Alliance	Mohamed Taib	8,798	44.60	▲44.60
Parti Rakyat Malaysia	Mohd Ramly Ismail @ Dzulkifli Ismail	7,491	37.97	▲37.97
PMIP	Tengku Kamarulzaman Tengku Abd. Hamid	3,438	17.43	▲17.43
Total valid votes		19,727	100.00	
Total rejected ballots		1,011		
Unreturned ballots		0		
Turnout		20,738	68.77	
Registered electors		30,154		
Majority		1,307	6.63	
Alliance hold		Swing		

Malaysian general by-election, 11 November 1968 Upon the death of incumbent, Abdul Rahman Talib
Party	Candidate	Votes	%	∆%
On the nomination day, Mohamed Taib won uncontested.
Alliance	Mohamed Taib			
Total valid votes			100.00	
Total rejected ballots				
Unreturned ballots				
Turnout				
Registered electors				
Majority				
Alliance hold		Swing		

Malaysian general election, 1964
Party	Candidate	Votes	%	∆%
Alliance	Abdul Rahman Talib	10,696	69.42	▼6.83
Socialist Front	Mohamed Kameil Ibrahim	2,957	19.19	▲19.19
PMIP	Jamahir Idris	1,755	11.39	▼12.36
Total valid votes		15,408	100.00	
Total rejected ballots		710		
Unreturned ballots		0		
Turnout		16,118	73.64	▲2.83
Registered electors		21,889		
Majority		7,739	50.23	▼2.27
Alliance hold		Swing		

Malayan general election, 1959
Party	Candidate	Votes	%
Alliance	Abdul Rahman Talib	8,856	76.25
PMIP	Hamzah Dahaman	2,758	23.75
Total valid votes		11,614	100.00
Total rejected ballots		106	
Unreturned ballots		0	
Turnout		11,720	70.81
Registered electors		16,552	
Majority		6,098	52.50
This was a new constituency created.
