= Chan Chun Kuang =

Malaysian politician

Yang Berhormat Tuan Chan Chun Kuang MLA
- 陈俊广
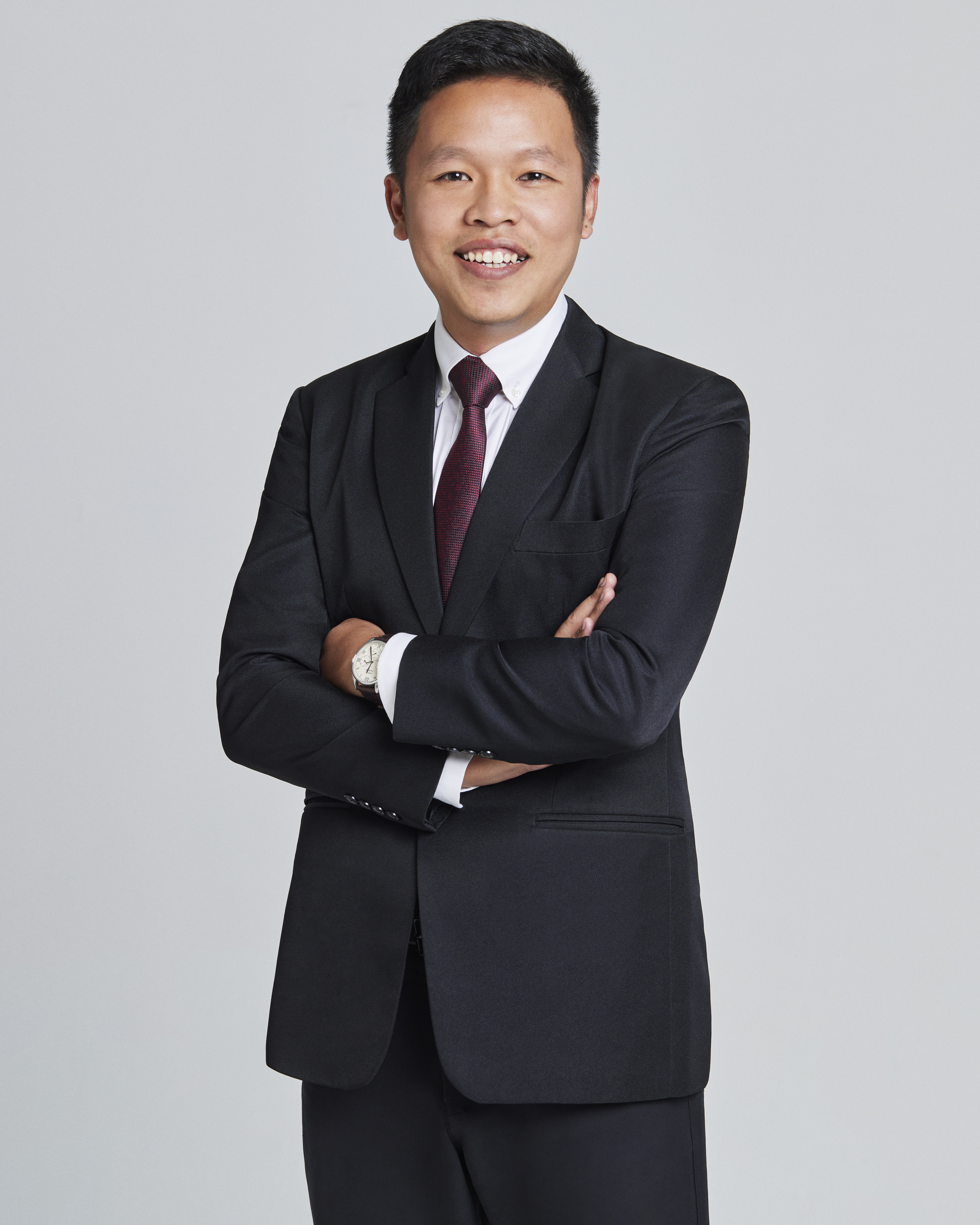

Member of the Pahang State Legislative Assembly for Semambu
- Incumbent
- Assumed office 19 November 2022
- Preceded by: Lee Chean Chung (PH–PKR)
- Majority: 1,804 (2022)

Personal details
- Born: 1992 (age 33–34)
- Party: People's Justice Party (PKR)
- Other political affiliations: Pakatan Harapan (PH)
- Education: Universiti Utara Malaysia (UUM)
- Occupation: Politician

Chan Chun Kuang is a Malaysian politician who served as Member of the Pahang State Legislative Assembly (MLA) for Semambu since November 2022. He is a member, State Vice Chairman and State Youth Chief of Pahang of the People's Justice Party (PKR), a component party of the Pakatan Harapan (PH) coalitions.

== Political career ==
In 2022 Pahang state election, Chan Chun Kuang was made his electoral debut after being nominated by PH for contest in Semambu state seat. Chan Chun Kuang is contesting against Zulfadli Zakariah of Perikatan Nasional, Mohd Khairul Hisham Omar of Barisan Nasional and Rashidah Abdul Rahman of Pan-Malaysian Islamic Front. He won the seat by gaining 18,902 votes with the majority of 1,804.

== Election results ==
Pahang State Legislative Assembly
Year	Constituency	Candidate	Votes	Pct	Opponent(s)	Votes	Pct	Ballot cast	Majority	Turnout
2022	N13 Semambu	Chan Chun Kuang (PKR)	18,902	40.01%	Zulfadli Zakariah (PAS)	17,098	36.19%	47,723	1,804	78.01%
2022	N13 Semambu	Chan Chun Kuang (PKR)	18,902	40.01%	Mohd Khairul Hisham Omar (UMNO)	10,422	22.06%	47,723	1,804	78.01%
2022	N13 Semambu	Chan Chun Kuang (PKR)	18,902	40.01%	Rashidah Abdul Rahman (BERJASA)	820	1.74%	47,723	1,804	78.01%
