= Beserah (state constituency) =

Political subdivision in Malaysia

Beserah (N12)
Pahang constituency

State constituency
- Legislature: Pahang State Legislative Assembly
MLA
Andansura Rabu
PN
- Constituency created: 1959
- First contested: 1959
- Last contested: 2022

Demographics
- Electors (2022): 59,370

Beserah is a state constituency in Pahang, Malaysia, that has been represented in the Pahang State Legislative Assembly.

== Demographics ==
Ethnic breakdown of Beserah's electorate as of 2022
1. Malay (74.3%)
2. Chinese (20.9%)
3. Indian (2.71%)
4. Other ethnicities (2.03%)

== History ==
=== Polling districts ===
According to the federal gazette issued on 31 October 2022, the Beserah constituency is divided into 13 polling districts.

State constituency	Polling districts	Code	Location
Beserah (N12)	Cherating	082/12/01	SK Cherating
Beserah (N12)	Sungai Ular	082/12/02	SK Sungai Ular
Beserah (N12)	Balok Makmur	082/12/03	SK Balok Baru
Beserah (N12)	Balok Baru	082/12/04	SK Balok Makmur
Beserah (N12)	Balok	082/12/05	SK Balok; SMK Chengal Lempong
Beserah (N12)	Sungai Karang	082/12/06	SK Sungai Karang
Beserah (N12)	Alor Batu	082/12/07	SK Jabor
Beserah (N12)	Batu Hitam	082/12/08	SMK Beserah
Beserah (N12)	Kampung Beserah	082/12/09	SK Beserah
Beserah (N12)	Seri Pelindong	082/12/10	SMK Pelindung
Beserah (N12)	Alor Akar	082/12/11	Kolej Vokesional Kuantan
Beserah (N12)	Air Putih Baru	082/12/12	SMK Air Putih
Beserah (N12)	Air Putih	082/12/13	SJK (C) Pei Chai

=== Representation history ===
Members of the Legislative Assembly for Beserah
Assembly	No	Years	Name	Party
Constituency created
1st	N11	1959–1964	Abdul Aziz Ahmad	Alliance (UMNO)
2nd	N11	1964–1969	Abdul Aziz Ahmad	Alliance (UMNO)
		1969–1971	Assembly dissolved	
3rd	N11	1971–1973	Abdul Aziz Ahmad	Alliance (UMNO)
3rd	N11	1973-1974	Abdul Aziz Ahmad	BN (UMNO)
4th	N11	1974–1978	Ismail Siabit	BN (UMNO)
5th	N11	1978–1982	Abdul Rahim Abu Bakar	BN (UMNO)
6th	N11	1982–1986	Latifah Abdul Ghaffar	BN (UMNO)
7th	N13	1986–1990	Mohamed Yusof Mohamed Ali	BN (UMNO)
8th	N13	1990–1995	Mohamed Yusof Mohamed Ali	BN (UMNO)
9th	N12	1995–1999	Jamal Ab Nasir Ismail	BN (UMNO)
10th	N12	1999–2004	Fauzi Abdul Rahman	BN (UMNO)
11th	N12	2004–2008	Fisar Abdullah	BN (UMNO)
12th	N12	2008–2013	Syed Mohammed Tuan Lonnik	PR (PAS)
13th	N12	2013–2018	Andansura Rabu	PR (PAS)
14th	N12	2018–2020	Andansura Rabu	PAS
14th	N12	2020–2022	Andansura Rabu	PN (PAS)
15th	N12	2022–present	Andansura Rabu	PN (PAS)

== Election results ==
Pahang state election, 2022
Party	Candidate	Votes	%	∆%
PN	Andansura Rabu	23,867	51.80	▲51.80
PH	Zulkifli Mohamed	12,346	26.79	▲26.79
BN	Mustaffar Kamal Ab Hamid	9,346	20.28	▼7.09
PEJUANG	Mohd Pauzi Taib	394	0.86	▲0.86
Independent	Joseph Tang Sian Yew	126	0.27	▲0.27
Total valid votes		46,079	100.00	
Total rejected ballots		405		
Unreturned ballots		186		
Turnout		46,670	78.61	▼5.02
Registered electors		59,370		
Majority		11,521	25.01	▲20.92
PN hold		Swing		

Pahang state election, 2018
Party	Candidate	Votes	%	∆%
PAS	Andansura Rabu	12,239	38.36	▼19.14
PKR	Zulkifli Mohamed	10,934	34.27	▲34.27
BN	Suhaimi Jusoh @ Sulong	8,732	27.37	▼15.13
Total valid votes		31,905	100.00	
Total rejected ballots		331		
Unreturned ballots		0		
Turnout		32,384	83.63	▼1.45
Registered electors		38,721		
Majority		1,305	4.09	▼10.91
PAS hold		Swing		

Pahang state election, 2013
Party	Candidate	Votes	%	∆%
PAS	Andansura Rabu	15,346	57.50	▲3.64
BN	Mohd Hazmi Yusof	11,359	42.50	▼3.64
Total valid votes		26,705	100.00	
Total rejected ballots		305		
Unreturned ballots		103		
Turnout		27,113	85.57	▲6.44
Registered electors		31,685		
Majority		3,987	14.93	▲7.19
PAS hold		Swing		?

Pahang state election, 2008
Party	Candidate	Votes	%	∆%
PAS	Syed Mohammed Tuan Lonnik	10,728	53.87	▲17.10
BN	Fisar Abdullah	9,187	46.13	▼17.10
Total valid votes		19,915	100.00	
Total rejected ballots		316		
Unreturned ballots		192		
Turnout		20,423	79.13	▼0.83
Registered electors		25,808		
Majority		1,541	7.74	▼18.73
PAS gain from BN		Swing		-

Pahang state election, 2004
Party	Candidate	Votes	%	∆%
BN	Fisar Abdullah	12,447	63.23	▲10.06
PAS	Mohamad Hassim Yahia	7,237	36.77	▼10.06
Total valid votes		19,684	100.00	
Total rejected ballots		395		
Unreturned ballots		177		
Turnout		20,256	79.97	▲3.79
Registered electors		25,331		
Majority		5,210	26.47	▲20.11
BN hold		Swing		

Pahang state election, 1999
Party	Candidate	Votes	%	∆%
BN	Fauzi Abdul Rahman	8,242	53.18	▼10.97
PAS	Mohd Yusof Ibrahim	7,257	46.82	▲10.97
Total valid votes		15,499	100.00	
Total rejected ballots		671		
Unreturned ballots		502		
Turnout		16,672	76.17	▼0.03
Registered electors		21,887		
Majority		985	6.36	▼21.94
BN hold		Swing		

Pahang state election, 1995
Party	Candidate	Votes	%	∆%
BN	Jamal Ab Nasir Ismail	8,978	64.15	▲2.04
PAS	Raja Puji Tengku Abdul Hamid	5,018	35.85	▼2.04
Total valid votes		13,996	100.00	
Total rejected ballots		689		
Unreturned ballots		686		
Turnout		15,371	76.20	▲2.83
Registered electors		20,172		
Majority		3,960	28.29	▲4.08
BN hold		Swing		

Pahang state election, 1990
Party	Candidate	Votes	%	∆%
BN	Mohamed Yusof Mohamed Ali	8,398	62.11	▲0.55
PAS	Syed Zubaidi Syed Husin	5,124	37.89	▲21.08
Total valid votes		13,522	100.00	
Total rejected ballots		531		
Unreturned ballots		365		
Turnout		14,418	73.37	▲6.90
Registered electors		19,652		
Majority		3,274	24.21	▼15.72
BN hold		Swing		

Pahang state election, 1986
Party	Candidate	Votes	%	∆%
BN	Mohamed Yusof Mohamed Ali	6,416	61.56	▼2.31
DAP	Tajuddin Chik	2,254	21.63	▲21.63
PAS	Syed Zubaidi Syed Husin	1,753	16.82	▼15.43
Total valid votes		10,423	100.00	
Total rejected ballots		282		
Unreturned ballots		0		
Turnout		10,705	66.47	▼5.16
Registered electors		16,106		
Majority		4,162	39.93	▲8.32
BN hold		Swing		

Pahang state election, 1982
Party	Candidate	Votes	%	∆%
BN	Latifah binti Abdul Ghaffar	5,950	63.86	▼5.21
PAS	Syed Hassan Syed Idros	3,005	32.25	▲23.23
Independent	Syed Abdul Kadir Syed Alwi	362	3.89	▲3.89
Total valid votes		9,317	100.00	
Total rejected ballots		410		
Unreturned ballots		0		
Turnout		9,727	71.62	▼2.91
Registered electors		13,581		
Majority		2,945	31.61	▼23.83
BN hold		Swing		

Pahang state election, 1978
Party	Candidate	Votes	%	∆%
BN	Abdul Rahim Abu Bakar	5,312	69.08	▼1.24
Parti Rakyat Malaysia	Mohd. Ali Ismail	1,049	13.64	▼4.98
PAS	Syed Hassan Syed Idros	694	9.02	▲9.02
DAP	Jaafar Hussin	635	8.26	▲8.26
Total valid votes		7,690	100.00	
Total rejected ballots		278		
Unreturned ballots		0		
Turnout		7,968	74.54	▲0.13
Registered electors		10,690		
Majority		4,263	55.44	▲3.73
BN hold		Swing		

Pahang state election, 1974
Party	Candidate	Votes	%	∆%
BN	Ismail Siabit	3,490	70.32	▲70.32
Parti Rakyat Malaysia	Mohd. Sham Awang	924	18.62	▲18.62
Independent	Abdul Rashid Hussin	549	11.06	▲11.06
Total valid votes		4,963	100.00	
Total rejected ballots		411		
Unreturned ballots		0		
Turnout		5,374	74.41	▼1.25
Registered electors		7,222		
Majority		2,566	51.70	▲13.15
BN hold		Swing		-

Pahang state election, 1969
Party	Candidate	Votes	%	∆%
Alliance	Abdul Aziz Ahmad	2,945	69.28	▼12.30
PMIP	Bidin Aris	1,306	30.72	▲12.30
Total valid votes		4,251	100.00	
Total rejected ballots		491		
Unreturned ballots		0		
Turnout		4,742	75.67	▼2.95
Registered electors		6,267		
Majority		1,639	38.56	▼24.60
Alliance hold		Swing		

Pahang state election, 1964
Party	Candidate	Votes	%	∆%
Alliance	Abdul Aziz Ahmad	2,905	81.58	▲4.37
PMIP	Abdul Aziz Kassim	656	18.42	▼4.37
Total valid votes		3,561	100.00	
Total rejected ballots		274		
Unreturned ballots		0		
Turnout		3,835	78.62	▲0.04
Registered electors		4,878		
Majority		2,249	63.16	▲8.73
Alliance hold		Swing		

Pahang state election, 1959
Party	Candidate	Votes	%
Alliance	Abdul Aziz Ahmad	2,453	77.21
PMIP	Nik Leh Nik Mat	724	22.79
Total valid votes		3,177	100.00
Total rejected ballots		128	
Unreturned ballots		0	
Turnout		3,305	78.58
Registered electors		4,206	
Majority		1,729	54.42
This was a new constituency created.
