= Fauzi Abdul Rahman =

Malaysian politician (born 1946)

Yang Berbahagia Dato' Sri Fauzi Abdul Rahman SSAP DIMP AMP PPN
- فوزي بن عبدالرحمن

Chairman MyHSR Corporation Sdn Bhd
- Incumbent
- Assumed office 26 June 2023

Board of Directors Malaysia Rail Link (MRL)
- In office 2019–2021

President of the Paralympic Council of Malaysia
- In office 1991–2003

Ministerial roles
- 1990–1995: Parliamentary Secretary of Information
- 1995–1997: Parliamentary Secretary of Lands and Co-operatives Development
- 1997-1999: Deputy Minister in the Prime Minister's Department

Faction represented in Dewan Rakyat
- 1990–1999: Barisan Nasional
- 2013–2018: Parti Keadilan Rakyat

Faction represented in Pahang State Legislative Assembly
- 1999–2004: Barisan Nasional

Personal details
- Born: Fauzi Abdul Rahman; 27 August 1946 (age 79) Kuantan, Pahang, Malayan Union, British Malaya (now Malaysia)
- Citizenship: Malaysian
- Party: Parti Keadilan Rakyat (PKR) (2008–present); United Malays National Organisation (UMNO) (until 2008)
- Other political affiliations: Pakatan Harapan (PH) (2015–present); Pakatan Rakyat (PR) (2008–2015); Barisan Nasional (BN) (until 2008)
- Spouse: Khamisah Mohd
- Relations: Yahya Mohd Seth
- Children: Farahida Fauzi, Ahmad Faisal Fauzi, Faradiba Fauzi, Farahanim Fauzi, Ahmad Farhan Fauzi, Ahmad Faliq Fauzi
- Parent: Abdul Rahman Talib (Father)
- Education: Malay College Kuala Kangsar
- Alma mater: Imperial College London
- Occupation: Politician
- Fauzi Abdul Rahman on Facebook

Fauzi bin Abdul Rahman (Jawi: فوزي بن عبدالرحمن) (born 27 August 1946) is a Malaysian politician who has served as Chairman of MyHSR Corporation Sdn Bhd since July 2023. He also served as the Board of directors MRL East Coast Rail Link (2019–2021). He is a former Deputy Minister in the Prime Minister's Department (1997–1999) and former Pahang state chief of the People's Justice Party (PKR), a component in the Pakatan Harapan (PH) coalition. Fauzi was the former Member of Parliament for Indera Mahkota (2013–2018) and Kuantan (1990–1999). He is also a former Pahang State Assemblyman for Beserah (1999–2004). He also held the position of President of the Paralympic Council of Malaysia from 1991 to 2003.

Formerly, he was a member of United Malays National Organisation (UMNO) of Barisan Nasional (BN) coalition before he quits on 23 July 2008 to join People's Justice Party (Malaysia) (PKR).

His last political position in the Malaysian Parliament was as the Member of Parliament for Indera Mahkota, which he won under PKR in the 2013 Malaysia General Election, defeating Wan Adnan Wan Mamat of Barisan Nasional with a majority of 7,523 votes.

== Controversies and issues ==
In April 2001, Fauzi lodged a police report alleging that Mohd Khalil Yaakob misappropriated state resources as Menteri Besar of Pahang then.

== Family ==
His father was a former minister of Malaysia : Almarhum Dr Abdul Rahman Talib.

His son, Ahmad Farhan Fauzi is currently the political secretary to the Prime Minister, Anwar Ibrahim

== Election results ==
Pahang State Legislative Assembly
Year	Constituency	Candidate	Votes	Pct	Opponent(s)	Votes	Pct	Ballots cast	Majority	Turnout
1999	N12 Beserah	Fauzi Abdul Rahman (UMNO)	8,242	49.44%	Mohd Yusof Ibrahim (PAS)	7,257	43,53%	16,672	985	76.17%
2018	N17 Sungai Lembing	Fauzi Abdul Rahman (PKR)	2,687	22.69%	Md Sohaimi Mohamed Shah (UMNO)	5,436	45.90%	11,842	1,968	80.40%
2018	N17 Sungai Lembing	Fauzi Abdul Rahman (PKR)	2,687	22.69%	Mohd Hazmi Dibok (PAS)	3,468	29.29%	11,842	1,968	80.40%

Parliament of Malaysia
Year	Constituency	Candidate	Votes	Pct	Opponent(s)	Votes	Pct	Ballots cast	Majority	Turnout
1990	P075 Kuantan	Fauzi Abdul Rahman (UMNO)	25,020	56.64%	Ahmad Mokhtar Mohamed (S46)	19,153	43.36%	45,455	5,867	71.24%
1995	P078 Kuantan	Fauzi Abdul Rahman (UMNO)	33,718	76.04%	Noorsiah Tuajib (S46)	10,622	23.96%	47,547	23,096	72.44%
2013	P082 Indera Mahkota	Fauzi Abdul Rahman (PKR)	30,584	56.81%	Wan Adnan Wan Mamat (UMNO)	23,061	42.83%	54,737	7,523	85.23%
2013	P082 Indera Mahkota	Fauzi Abdul Rahman (PKR)	30,584	56.81%	Ponusamy Govindasamy (IND)	193	0.36%	54,737	7,523	85.23%

== Honours ==
=== Honour of Malaysia ===
- Malaysia
  - Medal of the Order of the Defender of the Realm (PPN) (1978)
- Pahang
  - Knight Grand Companion of the Order of Sultan Ahmad Shah of Pahang (SSAP) – Dato' Sri (2018)
  - Member of Order of the Crown of Pahang (AMP) (1980)
  - Knight Companion of the Order of the Crown of Pahang (DIMP) – Dato' (1988)
