= People's Justice Party (Malaysia) =

Reformist political party

People's Justice Party Parti Keadilan Rakyat
- Abbreviation: PKR; KEADILAN
- President: Anwar Ibrahim
- Secretary-General: Fuziah Salleh
- Deputy President: Saifuddin Nasution Ismail (acting)
- Vice-Presidents: Amirudin Shari; Ramanan Ramakrishnan; Aminuddin Harun; Chang Lih Kang; Roland Engan; Zaliha Mustafa; Saifuddin Nasution Ismail
- Women's Chief: Fadhlina Sidek
- Youth Chief: Kamil Abdul Munim (AMK); Nurhidayah Che Rose (Srikandi)
- Founders: Anwar Ibrahim; Wan Azizah Wan Ismail
- Founded: 4 April 1999; 27 years ago (as Parti Keadilan Nasional); 3 August 2003; 23 years ago (as Parti Keadilan Rakyat)
- Merger of: National Justice Party (KeADILan); Malaysian People's Party (PRM)
- Headquarters: A-1-09, Merchant Square, Jalan Tropicana Selatan 1, 47410 Petaling Jaya, Selangor
- Newspaper: Suara Keadilan
- Think tank: Institut Rakyat
- Student wing: Mahasiswa Keadilan
- Youth wing: Angkatan Muda Keadilan (AMK)
- Women's wing: Wanita Keadilan
- Women's youth wing: Srikandi Keadilan
- Membership: 1,153,212 (2024)
- Ideology: Reformism; Anti-corruption; Social democracy; Factions: Social liberalism; Social conservatism; Islamic democracy
- Political position: Centre; Factions: Centre-left to centre-right
- National affiliation: Pakatan Harapan (since 2015) (Note: The party was formerly part of the Barisan Alternatif (1999–2004), Barisan Bersatu Sarawak (2006), Pakatan Rakyat (2008–2015), and Warisan Plus (2016–2021).); National Unity Government (since 2022)
- Colours: Light blue
- Slogan: Keadilan Untuk Semua ('Justice for All')
- Anthem: "Arus Perjuangan" ('Currents of Struggle')
- Dewan Negara: 10 / 70
- Dewan Rakyat: 27 / 222 7 Rafizi Faction MP status unclear
- Dewan Undangan Negeri: 35 / 612
- Chief minister of states: 1 / 13

Election symbol

Party flag

Website
- keadilanrakyat.org

The People's Justice Party (Malay: Parti Keadilan Rakyat, PKR or KEADILAN) is a reformist political party in Malaysia. It was founded in 2003 through the merger of its predecessor, the National Justice Party (KeADILan), with the socialist Malaysian People's Party (PRM). The party's predecessor was founded in 1999 by Wan Azizah Wan Ismail during the height of the Reformasi movement triggered by the imprisonment of her husband, former Deputy Prime Minister Anwar Ibrahim. Following the 2022 election that resulted in a hung parliament, the party governs Malaysia through a unity government led by Anwar Ibrahim as the tenth Prime Minister of Malaysia.

In the first general election of its predecessor in 1999, the party won five seats in the Dewan Rakyat. A resurgence by the ruling Barisan Nasional (BN) in 2004 reduced PKR to a single seat in the traditional stronghold of Permatang Pauh. The 2008 election produced a substantial swing to the opposition, with PKR increasing its representation to 31 seats and forming the government in five states. The 2008 results also precipitated the resignation of Prime Minister Abdullah Ahmad Badawi and the lifting of Anwar Ibrahim's five-year political ban on 14 April 2008.

The Pakatan Harapan (PH) coalition, of which PKR is a founding and principal member, defeated Barisan Nasional at the 2018 general election, ending BN's uninterrupted 60-year rule since independence. However, defections from the faction aligned to Azmin Ali within the party and the withdrawal of BERSATU triggered the collapse of the PH government after just 22 months, leading to the 2020–2022 political crisis. The party returned to government after the 2022 general election which resulted in Malaysia's first hung parliament. A unity government arrangement between Pakatan Harapan, former rivals Barisan Nasional, and several Borneo-based parties enabled the formation of a federal government led by Anwar Ibrahim.

The multiracial party advocates for institutional reform and economic justice, drawing its strongest support from urban and semi-urban constituencies, particularly in the states of Selangor, Penang, Perak, Negeri Sembilan, Johor, and the capital city of Kuala Lumpur. The party's platform emphasises Reformasi-era priorities such as anti-corruption measures and social justice.

== History ==
=== Origins ===
During the 1997 Asian financial crisis, a political rift developed between Prime Minister Mahathir Mohamad and Deputy Prime Minister Anwar Ibrahim. As the Malaysian ringgit depreciated by over 60 per cent against the US dollar, Anwar argued with increasing frequency for structural reforms. Under his authority as Finance Minister, Anwar sought to alleviate the economic fallout by instituting a series of economic reforms and austerity measures, which reduced government spending by 18%, cut ministerial salaries, and deferred several megaprojects that formed the cornerstone of Mahathir's development strategy. The policies directly conflicted with Mahathir's stance, which favoured an expansionary approach and blamed the nation's economic instability solely on currency speculation by figures like George Soros. Mahathir advocated instead for isolationist policies and currency convertibility fixes, contrasting heavily with Anwar's free-market reforms that he interpreted as a challenge to his administration. The situation escalated when Anwar proposed amendments to the Prevention of Corruption Act that sought to expand the powers of the Anti-Corruption Agency (ACA). Mahathir strongly opposed the measures, causing their relationship to significantly deteriorate towards the end of 1998. The disagreements grew into a larger rift as Anwar began touring the country and speaking publicly, which Mahathir perceived as a vehicle for growing anti-administration dissent. Although Anwar was Mahathir's own protégé and held substantial influence within both the party and government, their conflicting views culminated in Mahathir dismissing him from all cabinet posts on 2 September 1998. He was then expelled from the United Malays National Organisation (UMNO) the day after.

The dismissal was not unexpected, having been preceded by structural manoeuvers designed to undermine Anwar's authority. Behind the scenes, Mahathir had systematically bypassed his deputy by transferring responsibility over economic policymaking to his close ally, Daim Zainuddin. This political fracturing culminated in early September 1998, when Anwar's removal coincided with the sudden imposition of stringent capital controls. On 1 September, Mahathir announced a dramatic pivot away from Anwar's free-market policies, introducing sweeping currency exchange controls and pegging the Malaysian ringgit at 3.8 to the US dollar. The very next day, Anwar was dismissed from his positions as Deputy Prime Minister and Finance Minister. Financial analysts suggested that the precise timing of the capital controls was designed to preemptively prevent capital flight triggered by Anwar's anticipated arrest. Although their primary divide emerged from national economic policy, Anwar was ostensibly fired over claims of sexual misconduct. Before formal charges were even laid, Mahathir publicly accused Anwar of adultery and sodomy, alleging that his deputy had staged a cover-up of the scandals. However, the claims were later revealed to be false as part of a targeted defamation campaign to discredit Anwar.

The removal of Anwar triggered an immediate crisis of loyalty within UMNO and the civil service. Tensions had already mounted at the June 1998 UMNO General Assembly, where copies of a defamatory book titled 50 Dalil Mengapa Anwar Tidak Boleh Jadi PM ("50 Reasons Why Anwar Cannot Be Prime Minister") mysteriously appeared in the delegate bags of attendees. Speculation grew that Anwar was planning a party coup, catalysed by uncertainties surrounding Mahathir's unfulfilled promises of a political succession plan. The party eventually fractured following the sacking. A large contingent of party leaders who were considered "Anwaristas" openly rebelled, while others privately confessed dissatisfaction but suppressed their doubts, choosing instead to remain loyal to the establishment. Although the political elite generally complied, their stance contrasted sharply with broader public sentiment. Leaked Special Branch reports and independent surveys revealed that up to 80% of civil servants and party members, 60% of university students, and an overwhelming majority of Malay voters had withdrawn support from Mahathir, whereas rural villages remained evenly split between Mahathir and Anwar.

Despite his dismissal, Anwar continued to publicly express his political views, drawing widespread popularity. The growing public discontent soon erupted into street demonstrations, culminating on 20 September when Anwar led a rally of over 50,000 demonstrators through Merdeka Square in Kuala Lumpur. The protest coincided with the arrival of Queen Elizabeth II for the closing ceremony of the 1998 Commonwealth Games. Hours later, a major security crackdown was launched by the state. Approximately five hundred riot police were deployed to execute Anwar's arrest, forcibly breaching the front door of his family home before taking him away in a heavily guarded van. Shortly after, sixteen of Anwar’s prominent political and civil allies were systematically detained between 20 and 29 September under the Internal Security Act (ISA), which permitted detention without trial. The invocation of the ISA effectively stripped Anwar of the constitutional and statutory protections normally granted to criminal defendants, allowing the state to hold him in an undisclosed location without formal charges. The state crackdown targeted a broad coalition of Anwar's closest allies, including key political defectors, religious leaders, and student activists. Those detained alongside Anwar under the ISA included:

- Anwar Ibrahim – Former Deputy Prime Minister and Finance Minister
- Ahmad Zahid Hamidi – United Malays National Organisation (UMNO) Youth Chief
- Ruslan Kasim – Negeri Sembilan UMNO Youth Chief
- Kamarudin Jaffar – Tumpat UMNO Division Chief
- Tamunif Mokhtar – Cheras UMNO Division Chief
- Zambry Abdul Kadir – Lumut UMNO Youth Chief
- Kamarudin Md Nor – UMNO State Assemblyman for Semerak
- Asmaon Ismail – UMNO State Assemblyman for Panti
- Abdul Malek Hussin – Malaysian Islamic Party (PAS) Executive Secretary
- Ahmad Azam Ab Rahman – Malaysian Islamic Youth Movement (ABIM) President
- Shaharuddin Badaruddin – ABIM Secretary-General
- Mukhtar Redzuan – ABIM Deputy President
- Abdul Halim Ismail – ABIM Vice-President
- Amidi Abdul Manan – National Muslim Students Association (PKPIM) President
- Ahmad Shabrini Md Sidek – PKPIM Secretary-General
- Sidek Baba – International Islamic University Malaysia (IIUM) Deputy Rector
- Zulkifli Nordin – Member of Anwar Ibrahim's legal team

During his initial state custody, Anwar was subjected to a nine-day incommunicado detention where he was blindfolded and handcuffed. During this time, he was severely beaten by Inspector-General of Police Abdul Rahim Mohd Noor and denied immediate medical attention. The assault became public after Anwar appeared in court bearing visible physical injuries, most notably a swollen black eye. In tandem with his detention, the government restricted his wife’s movements in a measure that critics described as blatant political intimidation. This followed a nationwide ban on pro-reform rallies as part of a sweeping crackdown on freedom of assembly. The actions drew widespread condemnation from international observers and human rights organisations, leading Amnesty International to designate the detainees as "prisoners of conscience" targeted solely for non-violent political activities, followed by calls from the European Parliament for an independent international investigation. On 29 September, Anwar was formally indicted on nine counts of corruption and sexual misconduct, including four counts of sodomy. The vague nature of the charges, combined with subsequent recantations of several key witnesses, led to sharp criticism from international bodies, including the US Senate Foreign Relations Subcommittee, which characterised the prosecution as a politically motivated effort to discredit Anwar within a conservative Muslim society. Following two highly contentious trials, Anwar was convicted of corruption and sodomy by the High Court, presided by judges Augustine Paul and Arifin Jaka respectively. Although he maintained his innocence, he was ultimately sentenced to a cumulative fifteen years in prison.

The incident provoked an unprecedented public backlash that gave birth to the Reformasi movement. Driven by widespread public anger over charges that supporters argued were politically motivated, the movement initially focused on demanding Mahathir’s resignation and an end to alleged cronyism and corruption within the ruling Barisan Nasional (BN) administration. Over the years, the movement transitioned from street protests, civil disobedience, and internet activism into an organised movement demanding social justice and institutional reform. This period permanently altered the trajectory of Malaysian politics, unifying a historically fragmented opposition and establishing a political momentum that ultimately led to the defeat of Barisan Nasional in the 2018 general election, ending 61 years of one-party rule since independence.

=== Founding and early history (1998–1999) ===
The Reformasi movement continued to develop despite Anwar's detention, with "Justice for Anwar" remaining a potent rallying call. Before his arrest, Anwar had designated his wife, Wan Azizah Wan Ismail, as his successor to lead the movement. Wan Azizah went on to develop a formidable grassroots following, attracting thousands to her speeches and drawing frequent parallels to Corazon Aquino of the Philippines. For a time, these followers held massive weekend demonstrations, primarily in Kuala Lumpur but occasionally in Penang and other cities, demanding "keadilan" (justice) and Mahathir's resignation. During Anwar's police custody in September 1998, he was beaten by Inspector-General of Police Abdul Rahim Mohd Noor. The resulting imagery of Anwar's black eye became a rallying symbol for justice and eventually inspired the flag of his new political party. Jocularly known as the Bendera Mata Lebam ("Black Eye Flag"), the flag was designed by artist Syed Ahmad Syed Jamal.

Flag of the National Justice Party

As the Reformasi movement gained massive domestic momentum, Mahathir and the Malaysian government sought to discredit it by repeatedly framing it as a product of foreign interference. This narrative intensified following US Vice President Al Gore's remarks at the 1998 APEC summit in Kuala Lumpur, where he publicly expressed support for the Reformasi movement, using the word "reformasi" itself and praising its supporters as the "brave people of Malaysia". International media reported that Gore's remarks served as a sharp rebuke to the Malaysian government and provided an unexpected boost for Anwar's supporters. US President Bill Clinton was said to back this sentiment, signalled by his absence at the summit, alongside US Secretary of State Madeleine Albright's highly publicised decision to meet with Wan Azizah. Following the speech, government ministers claimed that Gore's remarks proved a "foreign conspiracy to interfere in Malaysia's domestic affairs" and asserted that external elements were behind the reform movement.

Despite the state’s effort to paint Reformasi as a foreign plot, support for the movement only grew, and the leadership began channelling its growing momentum into formal political organisation. To bridge the gap between Islamic-oriented and secular advocacy groups, Wan Azizah and long-time activist Chandra Muzaffar launched the Movement for Social Justice (Pergerakan Keadilan Sosial), also known as ADIL, on 10 December 1998. ADIL claimed upwards of 70,000 "endorsers", but its bid for official registration was consistently blocked. Facing these structural issues, the Reformasi leadership pivoted and instead merged with the Muslim Community Union of Malaysia (Ikatan Masyarakat Islam Malaysia), a minor Islamic political party based in Terengganu. Through this legal vehicle, they formally launched the National Justice Party (Parti Keadilan Nasional, or KeADILan) at the Renaissance Kuala Lumpur Hotel on 4 April 1999. This timely registration allowed the party to contest the 1999 general election, putting to rest months of intense speculation over whether Wan Azizah’s faction would remain an NGO, join the Malaysian Islamic Party (PAS), take over the Malaysian People's Party (PRM), or attempt an internal coup within UMNO.

Wan Azizah took the helm as the party's founding president, with Chandra Muzaffar appointed as her deputy. The leadership lineup also featured vice-presidents Tian Chua, Marina Yusoff, and Sheikh Azmi Ahmad, alongside Anwar’s former political secretary, Ezam Mohd Noor, who was named youth leader. The role of women's chief was assumed by Nell Onn, who was notable for her lineage as the sister of former Prime MInister Hussein Onn and daughter of UMNO founder Onn Jaafar. The symbolism of the Reformasi movement was represented by the party flag, which Wan Azizah noted as directly referencing the black eye Anwar sustained while in police custody, serving as a permanent emblem for "the eye that seeks justice". Despite championing a multiracial platform, the party primarily targeted moderate middle-class Malay voters that were alienated from UMNO, drawing historical comparisons to the broad platform of the defunct Malaysian Social Justice Party (PEKEMAS).

Anwar initially did not assume formal membership in KeADILan, instead leveraging his position as an outsider to maintain strategic ties within his former party. The decision allowed Anwar to serve as a bridge to sympathetic establishment factions, which prevented the alienation of moderate Malay nationalists who were reluctant to leave the ruling coalition. Despite his expulsion, Anwar retained substantial grassroots and divisional loyalty within UMNO, with many of his long-time allies opting to remain within the party to influence it internally. While some of these figures eventually transitioned into the opposition, several "Anwaristas" remained within UMNO until the present day. This strategy preserved the careers and influence of prominent Anwar allies such as Ahmad Zahid Hamidi, who eventually assumed the UMNO presidency, and Zambry Abdul Kadir, who became BN Secretary-General. Their internal survival occurred despite severe establishment pressure, including the arrest and detainment of both leaders over their associations with Anwar during the height of the 1998 crackdown.

=== Barisan Alternatif era (1999–2004) ===
Ahead of the 1999 general election, the allied opposition parties announced their plans in June to form an electoral pact and contest in 192 parliamentary constituencies. KeADILan joined with the Democratic Action Party (DAP), the Malaysian People's Party (PRM), and the Malaysian Islamic Party (PAS) in a big tent alliance of liberals, socialists, and Islamists, forming the Barisan Alternatif (BA) on 24 October 1999 to take on the ruling Barisan Nasional (BN) coalition. In the past, the main obstacle to opposition cooperation had been the advocacy from PAS for the establishment of an Islamic state in Malaysia, including at least partial imposition of hudud laws. While non-Muslims would have full civil rights, including freedom of religion, their political rights would be limited as non-Muslims. The other opposition parties in Malaysia, particularly DAP, were opposed to the idea of an Islamic state. However, PAS expressed its willingness to temporarily shelve the concept for the sake of opposition unity. Despite that, many DAP supporters were not keen on cooperation with PAS, distrusting their downplaying of the "Islamic state" issue. Nevertheless, the reservations were set aside for lack of other options.

While parliament's term was set to end in June the next year, an early election was called in November under the pretext of avoiding "undesirable" behaviour during the Islamic holy month of Ramadan in December. International media speculated that Mahathir wanted an early election to be held before some 650,000 new voters became eligible to participate. In the lead-up to the election, multiple activists and party members were arrested following a massive demonstration of over 10,000 protesters at the National Mosque on 19 September, including KeADILan leaders Tian Chua, Mohamed Azmin Ali, Ezam Mohd Nor, Abdul Ghani Haroon, and Badrulamin Bahron. During the demonstration, Mustaffa Kamil Ayub and Hanafiah Man were beaten by the police and labeled "at risk of detention" alongside Ruslan Kasim, Lokman Noor Adam, and Gobalakrishnan Nagapan.

With parliament dissolving on 11 November, parties were only left with 9 days to campaign between the nomination period and election day from 20 to 29 November. The short campaign period drew heavy criticism from the opposition. The party also entered the campaign with many of its key leaders under arrest while having to contend with the distribution of libelous pornographic videocassettes that implicated Anwar, as well as a lack of access to traditional and printed media. The government also cracked down on press freedom and denied opposition parties access to state-run public broadcaster Radio Televisyen Malaysia (RTM), a departure from previous elections where the opposition was given at least token air-time on radio to present its electoral strategy. During the campaign period, Mahathir was even alleged to have launched a fear campaign targeted at non-Muslim voters, including trying to arouse fears of racial division, Islamic fundamentalism, and a repeat of the unrest that accompanied Indonesia's reform movement. Television advertisements, news bulletins and full-page advertisements in newspapers branded the opposition as rioters and looters who would bring instability, and the government threatened that if Malaysians, especially Chinese voters, supported the opposition, Malaysia would become as "riot-torn and bloody" as Indonesia, with television channels broadcasting images from Indonesia’s racial riots "almost hourly".

The election eventually resulted in an opposition defeat. Despite winning 40.28% of the vote, Barisan Alternatif won only 42 of 193 seats, far fewer than the 65 needed to break BN's two-thirds majority. Within the coalition, KeADILan won five seats with 11.67% of the vote. The rest was won by PAS and DAP with 27 and 10 seats respectively. However, the party secured a symbolic victory after Wan Azizah won in Permatang Pauh, the seat formerly held by her husband, with a majority of 9,077 votes. Despite Wan Azizah's popularity, the biggest opposition winner was PAS, which increased 20 seats from the previous election and won a majority in the two state assemblies of Kelantan and Terengganu, while its party membership grew from 500,000 in September 1998 to about 700,000 a year later. Although voters were described as sympathetic to criticisms of cronyism and corruption, political experts believed that most voters did not consider the opposition to be a reliable alternative. Nevertheless, the ruling Barisan Nasional suffered badly despite securing a two-thirds majority of 148 seats, as four cabinet ministers, six deputy ministers, one chief minister, and several state executive councillors lost their seats. For the first time in Malaysia's history, UMNO also received less than half of the Malay vote. However, most non-Malays remained loyal to the government due to concerns over stability alongside a successful fear campaign, with many Chinese voters rejecting the opposition coalition over its association with a fundamental Islamic party.

In April 2001, following public protests over Anwar’s continued detention, the government arrested ten high-profile activists over a two-week period. Most of them were senior KeADILan leaders, which included Tian Chua, Ezam Mohd Nor, Gobalakrishnan Nagapan, Saari Sungib, Badrulamin Bahron, Abdul Ghani Haroon, and Lokman Noor Adam, whereas the other detainees were civil society leaders, including Badaruddin Ismail, Raja Petra Kamaruddin, and Hishamuddin Rais. The government claimed that the KeADILan activists were planning violent protests with the aim of overthrowing the government, and had been attempting to procure weapons and explosives. Despite the serious nature of the charges, the government produced no evidence to support its claim. The arrested were subsequently charged and incarcerated under the Internal Security Act, and would later become known as the Reformasi 10. While in detention, the KeADILan detainees were regularly threatened, coerced, and psychologically abused. The detainees were also interrogated for several hours straight over multiple days while being kept in solitary confinement, and were denied access to an attorney or family visits during the first several weeks of their detention. The interrogators were also accused of threatening physical abuse to force the KeADILan detainees into confessing to various crimes or to answer questions. According to the Human Rights Watch, the tactics had been used to maximise the psychological pressure on the detainees and to coerce them into making false confessions about taking steps to overthrow the government by force.

==== Merger with Parti Rakyat Malaysia (2003) ====
The post-election period saw negotiations between KeADILan and the socialist Malaysian People's Party (PRM) in 2000 over a possible merger. However, the proposal faced internal opposition from the party's Islamic democratic ABIM faction led by Ahmad Azam Ab Rahman. As a result, the party failed to obtain the necessary two-thirds majority in July 2001 that would amend its constitution to facilitate the merger. Nevertheless, PRM delegates overwhelmingly voted to support the merger at their congress that year. On 25 July 2002, a memorandum of understanding (MoU) was signed between the two parties at the KeADILan headquarters at Phileo Damansara in Petaling Jaya, Selangor, to formalise the merger process and overcome remaining disagreements, including over key posts in the new party. The MoU contained 13 articles covering the new party's name, logo, leadership transition, and organisational structure. A key provision was that all major decisions by the transitional leadership would be made by consensus to avoid a power struggle. Witnesses to the MoU signing on KeADILan's side included president Wan Azizah Wan Ismail, deputy president Abdul Rahman Othman, secretary-general Sahri Bahari, alongside Xavier Jayakumar, Fuziah Salleh, and Saifuddin Nasution Ismail, whereas delegates from PRM included president Syed Husin Ali, deputy president Rustam Sani, secretary-general Sanusi Osman, vice-presidents Lee Sang and Sivarasa Rasiah, along with Latheefa Koya.

The new flag of the People's Justice Party (PKR)

On 3 August 2003, the merger was officially launched at the Kuala Lumpur and Selangor Chinese Assembly Hall (KLSCAH) in Bukit Bintang, Kuala Lumpur, attended by over 2,000 party members and supporters. The new party was named the People's Justice Party (Malay: Parti Keadilan Rakyat) and retained the "keADILan" acronym on top of the "PKR" abbreviation. The logo combined KeADILan's blue-and-white design with two red stripes on either side to signify PRM's presence. The party adopted a 17-point platform centred on democracy, justice, and equality for all Malaysians regardless of race or religion. It aimed to generate a "new political culture" and replace what it called "old politics". KeADILan's president, Wan Azizah Wan Ismail, became the new party's president, while PRM's president, Syed Husin Ali, became deputy president. The combined membership was approximated to be roughly 205,000.

Although the new party had been launched, the Registrar of Societies (ROS) delayed the approval of the constitutional amendments necessary to formalise the merger. An application had been submitted nine months before the launch, but had remained pending by August 2003. Party officials were told that while the ROS had cleared the amendments at their level, they were still waiting for clearance from other agencies. The resulting delay in the dissolution of PRM created a legal loophole that a dissident faction exploited. Although PRM delegates had voted in 2001 to dissolve the party and merge with KeADILan, the merger required ROS approval of the new party's constitution before the dissolution could take effect. This meant PRM technically continued to exist as a legal entity. This situation enabled a faction led by Hassan Abdul Karim, a former PRM youth chief, to attempt to revive the party. In April 2005, Hassan convened a special congress to revive PRM, arguing that the party had been left to languish and that the ROS had given notice it might be struck off the rolls. His former colleagues, including former president Syed Husin Ali, accused him of playing divisive politics.

=== Political setback and wilderness (2004–2008) ===
In September 2001, the opposition alliance was rocked when DAP abruptly withdrew from Barisan Alternatif due to irreconcilable differences with PAS over the Islamic state issue. The departure came shortly after the September 11 attacks in the United States, which had heightened sensitivities toward political Islam. The alliance had become politically untenable for DAP following the open declaration of support from PAS for the Taliban during the US-led invasion of Afghanistan. The crisis was aggravated by the failure of KeADILan to act as an effective mediator, particularly after DAP claimed that its protestations found no meaningful support from the party. Grassroots pressure was said to further compel the withdrawal ahead of the state election in Sarawak, since association with PAS was seen as a liability in a state where political Islam carried negative connotations. The concerns were later vindicated following the opposition's poor performance in the election. DAP went on to win only a single seat while the rest of BA were decimated, with the opposition losing the Chinese vote. The ruling BN coalition had previously portrayed DAP as a defender and champion of the Islamic state, so much that it became the centrepiece of the state's election campaign to the detriment of the party.

The withdrawal of DAP had left Barisan Alternatif significantly weakened, with the coalition losing its primary vehicle for attracting non-Malay support and appearing less capable of challenging the longstanding government. KeADILan also had to contend with obstruction from the ROS, with the amendments to the party constitution still yet to be approved. Despite the delay, the new party was determined to contest the election regardless. Party leaders believed that candidates would be able to run under the new party's emblem as long as it was registered with the Election Commission even without ROS's formal approval. As a result, the party proceeded with its launch, with PRM fielding candidates under KeADILan's new symbol. However, despite cooperation being continued between PAS, PRM, and KeADILan, the earlier split with DAP had caused heavy infighting among the opposition, rendering them incapable of reaching consensus on key issues. The most significant point of contention was the allocation of seats for the general election. The opposition parties were unable to agree on a distribution, leading to a disunited opposition campaign with multiple candidates contesting the same seats.

In October 2003, Mahathir stepped down as Prime Minister after 22 years in power amidst significant discontent within the Malay community. However, his tenure was considered to have received high approval among Chinese and Indian voters. His successor, Abdullah Ahmad Badawi, was well-regarded and had strong reformist credentials, having successfully taken a more moderate approach to governing compared to Mahathir. As a result, the ruling coalition saw a surge of popularity that translated into a landslide victory in the general election. BN secured 198 of 219 parliamentary seats with 63.8% of the popular vote, achieving its best electoral performance since the founding of Malaysia in 1963. In comparison, the opposition was decimated. KeADILan retained only one seat in its stronghold of Permatang Pauh, narrowly winning by 590 votes. The election occurred amidst allegations of irregularities, including thousands of voters disappearing from the electoral rolls alongside unusually high numbers of unreturned ballots. The poor showing was also attributed to malapportionment and gerrymandering during the 2002 constituency redelineation, with one estimate suggesting that on average, a vote for the BN government was worth 28 times the vote of a KeADILan supporter. Nevertheless, the victory of Barisan Nasional was mainly credited to Abdullah's reformist message, which successfully co-opted the opposition's anti-corruption campaign and neutralised their momentum. Abdullah's personal image and his successful projection of Islam Hadhari (transl. civilisational Islam) were cited as successfully influencing the return of Malay voters to BN, whom they had deserted en masse in 1999 in the wake of Reformasi.

Facing flagging morale following its dismal electoral performance, the party was revitalised following the overturning of Anwar Ibrahim's sodomy conviction on 2 September 2004. The Federal Court of Malaysia, in a landmark 2–1 majority decision, found that the High Court had "misdirected itself" and that Anwar's conviction was "unsafe", leading to his immediate release from prison. It also determined that the key witness, Azizan Abu Bakar, was unreliable due to inconsistencies and contradictions in his testimony, including giving three different dates for the alleged incident. The court ruled that Anwar should have been acquitted at the end of the prosecution's case without being called to enter a defence. The bench, led by Justice Abdul Hamid Mohamad, set aside the nine-year prison sentence. As Anwar had already served his six-year sentence for a separate corruption conviction, the overturning of the sodomy charge meant he was freed immediately. Despite his release, Anwar remained barred from holding public office until April 2008 due to his corruption conviction. Nevertheless, Anwar credited Abdullah Ahmad Badawi for not interfering with the judiciary, stating that "his predecessor wouldn't have made this judgment possible."

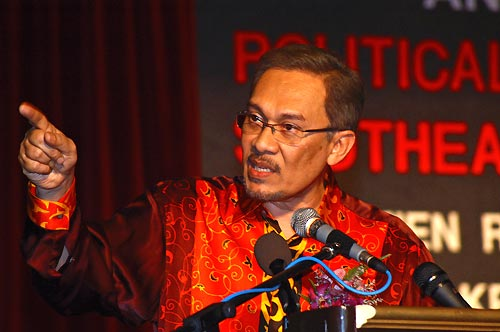
Anwar Ibrahim speaking in 2005

In December 2005, the party organised its second national congress in Kuala Lumpur. Among the motions passed was the New Economic Agenda (NEA), which envisioned a non-racial economic policy to replace the race-based New Economic Policy (NEP). The NEA was propounded by Anwar Ibrahim and outlined several key principles, including an emphasis on justice for all Malaysians, eradicating poverty regardless of race, narrowing the development gap between rural and urban areas, ensuring limited government intervention, and forging partnerships with the private sector. The New Economic Agenda was a direct challenge to the NEP, which had been the cornerstone of Malaysia's affirmative action policy since 1971, but was seen by PKR as benefiting only a certain political elite and fostering cronyism. The motion was unanimously approved by the congress.

The party managed a breakthrough into Sarawak politics in May 2006, a state traditionally known as a BN stronghold. In that year's state elections, the party won the Padungan constituency in Kuching, a majority Chinese locale. The party also narrowly lost in Saribas, a Malay-Melanau constituency, by just 94 votes. Despite an uneven playing field, with allegations of media bias, vote buying, and electoral manipulation, the opposition managed several victories, primarily in Chinese-majority constituencies, and emerged as an important player in the state for the first time since 1987. Analysts found that while traditional politics persisted among Malay voters, who were less keen on political change, Chinese voters were described as "more pragmatic and in favour of change." They also credited the "Anwar factor" for boosting party support, noting that BN's smear campaign likely backfired and prompted Chinese voters to no longer view Anwar as a radical Muslim.

The release of Anwar saw the party pursue a strategy of attracting personalities that aimed to broaden the party's appeal beyond its traditional base of activists and urban Malays. The most significant was the appointment of Khalid Ibrahim, a former CEO of Permodalan Nasional Berhad (PNB) and Guthrie, as treasurer-general of the party in July 2006. During his tenure at PNB, he famously led the "dawn raid" on the London Stock Exchange in 1981, acquiring 51% of Guthrie Corporation in less than two hours. His entry into PKR was considered a major coup, bringing financial and governing expertise to a party that had been largely associated with street activism and the Reformasi movement. Former ministers and deputy ministers were also among the notable recruits, including Zaid Ibrahim, Chua Jui Meng, Jeffrey Kitingan, and Fauzi Abdul Rahman.

=== Pakatan Rakyat era (2008–2015) ===
In the 2008 elections, PKR contested alongside DAP and PAS in a new coalition known as Pakatan Rakyat (PR). The party won 31 seats in parliament, while DAP and PAS won 28 and 23 seats respectively. The 82 seats won by the coalition denied BN a two-thirds majority against a backdrop of rises in inflation, crime, and ethnic tension.

PKR also successfully contested the state legislative elections which saw the loose coalition of PKR, DAP and PAS forming coalition governments in the states of Kelantan, Kedah, Penang, Perak and Selangor. The offices of the Menteri Besar of Selangor and the Deputy Chief Minister of Penang were held by PKR members, Khalid Ibrahim and Fairus Khairuddin, respectively.

Anwar's five-year ban from contesting elections, imposed on anyone sentenced to longer than a year in jail, ended on 14 April 2008. A gathering held by supporters celebrating the end of the ban was dispersed by police. Despite the ban, Anwar continued being widely seen as PKR's de facto leader throughout his imprisonment.

Anwar returned to parliament on 28 August 2008 following a landslide victory in the 2008 Permatang Pauh by-election, triggered by Wan Azizah's resignation. He was quoted as saying, "I'm glad to be back after a decade. The prime minister has lost the mandate of the country and the nation", Despite the claim, Anwar would need at least 30 defections from government lawmakers to form a majority.

In June 2010, the party's official newspaper, Suara Keadilan, was suspended over an article alleging that the Federal Land Development Authority (Felda) had gone bankrupt. Government officials and Felda itself rejected the assertion as inaccurate. The Malaysian Home Ministry responded by issuing a show-cause letter to the publication demanding an explanation, to which the ministry stated that it was unsatisfied with the response given by the editors. The Home Ministry afterwards declined to renew the newspaper's publishing permit, which had expired on 30 June 2010, thereby halting its regular publication. The decision was made under the Printing Presses and Publications Act 1984, which grants the ministry broad authority to regulate and revoke publication permits. The suspension drew criticism from civil society organisations and press freedom advocates, who viewed the move as a regulatory pressure on opposition-linked publications in Malaysia.

On 9 January 2012, Anwar Ibrahim was acquitted of a separate sodomy charge from 2008 by the Kuala Lumpur High Court, presided over by Judge Mohamad Zabidin Diah. He had been accused by his former aide, Saiful Bukhari Azlan, of sodomising him. The court determined that the prosecution had failed to establish elements of the offence beyond a reasonable doubt, leading to Anwar's full discharge from the case.

==== Kajang Move (2014) ====
In early 2014, party strategy director Rafizi Ramli initiated the Kajang Move in a failed bid to install Anwar Ibrahim as the Menteri Besar of Selangor. The move aimed to consolidate opposition control in the state amid perceived weaknesses in the leadership of incumbent Menteri Besar Khalid Ibrahim. Proponents framed the move as an initiative intended to strengthen the coalition's rule and counter Barisan Nasional's influence by concentrating authority under a more assertive leader. The move began on 27 January 2014 when Kajang state assemblyman Lee Chin Cheh resigned from his seat, triggering a by-election. PKR intended for Anwar to contest and win the seat, which would allow his appointment as Menteri Besar through internal party reconfiguration.

However, the plan collapsed on 7 March when Anwar's acquittal in 2012 was overturned by the Court of Appeal. He was sentenced to five years in prison on sodomy charges, a verdict which disqualified him from holding public office that critics widely described as politically motivated. This prevented him from standing as a candidate in the 2014 Kajang by-election and potentially becoming Menteri Besar, although he remained a member of parliament pending the outcome of his appeal. The party subsequently nominated his wife, Wan Azizah Wan Ismail, as their candidate instead.

Wan Azizah secured victory in the 23 March by-election with 59.6 per cent of the vote against Barisan Nasional's candidate, but subsequent efforts to appoint her as Menteri Besar encountered resistance from the Selangor Sultan and internal Pakatan allies, particularly over constitutional and consensus issues. Critics, including former Menteri Besar Khalid Ibrahim, described the move as an undemocratic "fiasco" that bypassed electoral mandates and exposed internal power struggles within PKR. The political manoeuvre resulted in a nine-month political crisis within the Selangor state government and caused fractures within the Pakatan Rakyat coalition, requiring the involvement of the Royal Palace of Selangor. The crisis concluded with the appointment of PKR's Deputy President, Azmin Ali, as the 15th Menteri Besar of Selangor, and the expulsion of Khalid Ibrahim from the party. Most analysts regarded the Kajang Move as a failure.

=== Pakatan Harapan era (2015–present) ===
In 2015, Anwar Ibrahim's conviction was upheld, and he was imprisoned for a second time. Without his influence, conflict immediately emerged between PAS and DAP regarding the implementation of sharia law in Kelantan and Terengganu, resulting in the dissolution of the Pakatan Rakyat coalition in June 2015. It was succeeded by a new coalition known as Pakatan Harapan (PH) in September 2015, formed by the remnants of Pakatan Rakyat and the newly established National Trust Party (AMANAH), a PAS splinter which consisted of moderate PAS leaders who were ousted during the party's 2015 leadership election. The new coalition emphasised multiracial reformism, with a common manifesto pledging anti-corruption measures, electoral reforms, and economic redistribution to counter the long-standing dominance of Barisan Nasional.

The earlier split with PAS had left PKR and DAP without a Malay support base. However, this was supplemented by the entry of the Malaysian United Indigenous Party (BERSATU) in March 2017 as the fourth coalition partner. The UMNO splinter was led by former Prime Minister Mahathir Mohamad, and it brought veteran leadership while bolstering the coalition's Malay appeal against the ruling BN government. The entry of Mahathir's party marked the reconciliation of Anwar Ibrahim and Mahathir Mohamad, two longtime enemies since the former's imprisonment by the latter in 1998.

As the main opposition from 2015 to 2018, PKR challenged BN's rule through the PH coalition by highlighting scandals, such as the 1MDB scandal, where investigations revealed over US$4.5 billion in diverted assets linked to the accounts of Prime Minister Najib Razak. PH leveraged parliamentary scrutiny, public rallies, and protests organised by the Bersih coalition to erode BN's legitimacy.

==== Government formation (2018–2020) ====
When the 14th general election was held on 9 May 2018, Pakatan Harapan (PH) secured 113 of the 222 seats in the Dewan Rakyat, surpassing the 112 seats needed to form the government. The outcome ended 61 years of uninterrupted Barisan Nasional rule since Malaysia's independence in 1957. Meanwhile, PKR won 47 seats to become the largest party within the PH coalition. Mahathir Mohamad was sworn in as the seventh prime minister by the Yang di-Pertuan Agong at the Istana Negara on 10 May, and at the age of 92, became the world's oldest serving head of government at the time. The cabinet was formed with 25 members, including PKR president Wan Azizah Wan Ismail as deputy prime minister.

During its early period in office, the Pakatan Harapan government focused on implementing pledges from its "Buku Harapan" manifesto. The manifesto outlined ten key actions to be taken within the first 100 days, including the abolition of the Goods and Services Tax (GST) and the recovery of misappropriated public funds. The government also established a special task force to investigate the 1MDB scandal, which led to the seizure of assets belonging to former prime minister Najib Razak and the filing of corruption and money laundering charges against him. Other early measures included a review of major infrastructure projects such as the East Coast Rail Link (ECRL) for potential cost inflation, as well as an announcement of the government's intention to ratify the International Convention on the Elimination of All Forms of Racial Discrimination (ICERD). However, the decision was reversed following heavy demonstrations during the 2018 anti-ICERD rally.

As stipulated in the Pakatan Harapan manifesto, the Yang di-Pertuan Agong, Muhammad V of Kelantan, granted a full royal pardon to imprisoned opposition leader Anwar Ibrahim. He was released from Sungai Buloh Prison on 16 May after serving time on sodomy charges, which Anwar had maintained were politically motivated. Considered the prime minister–in-waiting, Anwar returned to parliament on 13 October through a by-election in Port Dickson. The by-election was triggered by the resignation of the incumbent, Danyal Balagopal Abdullah, a party member who vacated the seat to facilitate Anwar's return. The move became known as the "PD Move". Having previously been unable to contest the general election due to his imprisonment, Anwar secured the seat with a majority of over 31,000 votes, defeating six other candidates.

However, progress on broader structural reforms, including parliamentary redelineation and anti-corruption measures, proved slower amid internal disagreements and bureaucratic resistance. By August 2018, only a portion of the 100-day pledges had been fully implemented. Critics pointed to delays in economic stabilisation efforts, such as price controls for essential goods. Gross domestic product growth declined from 5.9 per cent in 2018 to 4.3 per cent in 2019, driven by global trade tensions and domestic fiscal tightening. As a result, the coalition faced difficulties in fully delivering on its manifesto, including partial toll reductions and subsidy rationalisation, due to the economic slowdown during that period.

==== Political crisis and opposition (2020–2022) ====
Towards the end of 2019, tensions emerged over the planned transition of power from Mahathir Mohamad to Anwar Ibrahim, which had been scheduled to occur within two years of the coalition taking office. Mahathir repeatedly refused to stand down, citing the need to complete reforms and the resolution of Anwar's legal clearance process. This dispute created a rift within PKR and began straining the coalition's unity. Within the party, an internal split developed between Anwar's leadership and the faction supporting Deputy President Azmin Ali, often referred to as the "Azmin cartel". The faction was considered aligned with Mahathir, and the conflict led to public disputes and defections that weakened the party's cohesion. The events culminated in the 2020–2022 Malaysian political crisis, triggered by Mahathir's sudden resignation as prime minister on 24 February 2020, which brought an end to the Pakatan Harapan government after 22 months. Mahathir did not provide a stated reason for his resignation, though reports indicated the move preempted an imminent parliamentary vote to appoint Anwar as prime minister.

The resulting power vacuum led to rapid realignments among MPs in an episode dubbed the "Sheraton Move", named after the Sheraton Hotel in Kuala Lumpur where defecting lawmakers met on 23 and 24 February to gather support for an alternative government. The outcome was the formation of the right-wing Perikatan Nasional (PN) coalition on 29 February, comprising BERSATU, PAS, and Azmin-aligned defectors from PKR. A new government was formed afterwards on 1 March by Muhyiddin Yassin of BERSATU, with a majority in Parliament obtained through the defections of eleven PKR members of parliament, including Azmin Ali, Zuraida Kamaruddin, Saifuddin Abdullah, Kamarudin Jaffar, Mansor Othman, Mohd Rashid Hasnon, Edmund Santhara, Ali Biju, Willie Mongin, Jonathan Yasin, and Baru Bian. All except Baru Bian chose to align with the Perikatan Nasional government formed afterwards, and they were later joined by Jugah Muyang, an independent who only joined PKR after the 2018 election.

The party subsequently suffered an exodus of members nationwide. This included elected representatives at the state level, which enabled the PN takeover of two state governments. The defections of Chong Fat Full in Johor along with Azman Nasrudin and Robert Ling Kui Ee in Kedah resulted in a PN majority in the two states. Other notable defections include Daroyah Alwi, deputy speaker of the Selangor legislature, and Afif Bahardin, a former vice youth chief. A number of members aligned with Azmin were also expelled, including women's chief Haniza Talha and state representatives Zulkifli Ibrahim and Kenny Chua Teck Ho. Defections continued into 2021 when two MPs, Larry Sng and Steven Choong, resigned to form Parti Bangsa Malaysia (PBM) before declaring support for the new PN government. The last MP to resign was vice-president Xavier Jayakumar, who cited 'frustrations' with the events of the past year and subsequently became a PN-aligned independent.

==== Return to government (2022–present) ====
Ahead of the 2022 general election, the party campaigned on its "Tawaran Harapan" manifesto, which emphasised the cost of living, institutional independence, and anti-corruption efforts. The election marked a slight setback for Pakatan Harapan, which lost its majority and won a reduced plurality of 82 seats. PKR returned only 31 MPs from the 47 seats previously won, losing its status as the coalition's largest component to DAP, which won 40 seats. In a symbolic defeat, the party also lost in its traditional stronghold of Permatang Pauh. The party's losses were later attributed to a decline in support among Malay voters, with some estimates suggesting that the party lost half of its Malay support due to a successful fear campaign over the party's association with the Chinese-dominated DAP.

Despite the setback, the party returned to power through a negotiated coalition government known as the "Unity Government" (transl. Kerajaan Perpaduan), formed between Pakatan Harapan and its former adversaries, including Barisan Nasional (BN), Gabungan Parti Sarawak (GPS), Gabungan Rakyat Sabah (GRS), and several minor parties, with Anwar Ibrahim appointed as the tenth prime minister. The arrangement marked a departure from the party's historical opposition to Barisan Nasional, with idealism being set aside for stability and continuity in governance. Despite alignment at the leadership level, historical animosity complicated cooperation between the grassroots of UMNO and PKR. The formation particularly drew opposition from a faction led by Deputy President Rafizi Ramli, citing unease that cooperation would contradict earlier reformist positions, as the Barisan Nasional embodied the political establishment that the party sought to challenge since its founding.

The cabinet was appointed in December 2022, with ministerial portfolios assigned to appease Barisan Nasional and the East Malaysian parties. With an ideologically diverse cabinet, stability efforts focused on coalition consensus and gradual policy implementation. However, the incremental pace of reforms brought intensified criticism.

The slow pace of institutional reforms culminated in a power struggle during the 2025 party elections between a faction led by Rafizi Ramli and the party establishment, led by Nurul Izzah Anwar. The party polls resulted in the landslide defeat and ouster of Rafizi and other aligned leaders from their positions, including Nik Nazmi as vice-president. Rafizi's defeat was interpreted as a demonstration of Anwar Ibrahim's overwhelming influence, with a strong mandate for the continuity of his vision for the party.

Following his defeat, Rafizi, alongside Nik Nazmi and several aligned grassroots leaders, exited PKR to establish a new political platform, Party Bersama Malaysia. Aligned MPs Wong Chen and Lee Chean Chung also resigned from PKR in 2026 to join the new party.

== Ideology ==
A supporter of liberal democracy, PKR's constitution has as one of its core principles, the establishment of "a society that is just and a nation that is democratic, progressive and united". In practice, the party has primarily focused on promoting social and economic justice, eliminating political corruption, and addressing human rights issues within a non-ethnic framework.

The party has also been described as having socially conservative and Islamic reformist factions influenced by the Malaysian Islamic Youth Movement (ABIM), of which Anwar was once president, which actively promotes Islamic values and maqasid syariah within its political platform.

== Organisational structure ==
=== Central Leadership Council (2025–2028) ===
- Advisory Council Chairwoman:
  - Wan Azizah Wan Ismail
- President:
  - Anwar Ibrahim
- Deputy President:
  - Saifuddin Nasution Ismail (acting)
- Vice Presidents (elected):
  - Amirudin Shari
  - Ramanan Ramakrishnan
  - Aminuddin Harun
  - Chang Lih Kang
- Vice Presidents (appointed):
  - Roland Engan
  - Saifuddin Nasution Ismail
  - Zaliha Mustafa
- Women's Chief:
  - Fadhlina Sidek
- Youth Chief:
  - Muhammad Kamil Abdul Munim
- Women's Youth Chief:
  - Nurhidayah Che Rose
- Secretary-General:
  - Fuziah Salleh
- Deputy Secretaries-General:
  - Saifuddin Shafi Muhammad
  - Aidi Amin Yazid
  - Bryan Ng Yih Miin
  - Sivamalar Genapathy
- Treasurer:
  - William Leong Jee Keen
- Deputy Treasurer:
  - Hee Loy Sian
- Information Chief:
  - Fahmi Fadzil
- Deputy Information Chief:
  - Siti Aishah Shaik Ismail
- Chief Organising Secretary:
  - Elizabeth Wong Keat Ping
- Deputy Chief Organising Secretary:
  - Muhammad Syaril Showkat Ali
- Communications Director:
  - Adam Adli Abd Halim
- Strategy Director:
  - Sim Tze Tzin
- Election Director:
  - Amirudin Shari
- Legal Bureau Chairman:
  - Sivarasa Rasiah
- Voluntary Bureau Chairman:
  - Syed Ibrahim Syed Noh
- Academy and Training Bureau Chairman:
  - Aminuddin Harun
- Religious Understanding Chairman:
  - Amidi Abdul Manan
- Education Bureau Chairman:
  - Mahmud Epah
- Central Election Committee Chairman:
  - Zaliha Mustafa
- Economy Bureau Chairman:
  - Akmal Nasrullah Mohd Nasir
- International Affairs Bureau Chairman:
  - Maszlee Malik
- Welfare Bureau Chairman:
  - ~~Rodziah Ismail~~
- OKU Bureau Chairman:
  - Isaiah Jacob
- Head of Disciplinary Committee:
  - Zainol Samah
- Political Bureau Members:
  - Anwar Ibrahim
  - Nurul Izzah Anwar
  - Amirudin Shari
  - Ramanan Ramakrishnan
  - Aminuddin Harun
  - Chang Lih Kang
  - Fadhlina Sidek
  - Muhammad Kamil Abdul Munim
  - Roland Engan
  - Saifuddin Nasution Ismail
  - Zaliha Mustafa
  - Akmal Nasrullah Mohd Nasir
  - Mohammed Taufiq Johari
  - Mohamad Abdul Hamid
  - Tengku Zafrul Aziz
- Central Leadership Council Members (elected):
  - Fahmi Fadzil
  - Adam Adli Abd Halim
  - Chan Ming Kai
  - Gunarajah George
  - Mohd Azlan Helmi
  - Maszlee Malik
  - Goh Choon Aik
  - Nor Azrina Surip
  - Elizabeth Wong Keat Ping
  - Abang Zulkifli Abang Engkeh
  - Siti Aishah Shaik Ismail
  - Syed Ahmad Syed Abdul Rahman Al-Hadad
  - Akmal Nasrullah Mohd Nasir
  - Amidi Abdul Manan
  - ~~Lee Chean Chung~~
  - Nor Azam Karap
  - Syed Ibrahim Syed Noh
  - Kumaresan Aramugam
  - Sim Chon Siang
  - Sivamalar Ganapathy
- Central Leadership Council Members (appointed):
  - Saifuddin Nasution Ismail
  - Abu Hafiz Salleh Hudin
  - Romli Ishak
  - Manolan Mohamad
  - Awang Husaini Sahari
  - Afandi Salleh
  - Nor Azman Mohamad
  - Yuneswaran Ramaraj
  - Jamawi Ja'afar
  - Ruji Ubi
  - Yamani Hafez Musa
  - Chiew Choon Man
- State Chairman:
  - Perlis: Noor Amin Ahmad
  - Kedah: Saifuddin Nasution Ismail
  - Kelantan: Mohamad Suparadi Md Noor
  - Terengganu: Zainuddin Awang @ Omar
  - Penang: Mohamad Abdul Hamid
  - Perak: Mohamad Hairul Amir Sabri
  - Pahang: Ahmad Farhan Fauzi
  - Selangor: Amirudin Shari
  - Federal Territories: Azman Abidin
  - Negeri Sembilan: Aminuddin Harun
  - Malacca: Adam Adli Abd Halim (Acting)
  - Johor: Zaliha Mustafa
  - Sabah: Mustapha Sakmud
  - Sarawak: Mahmud Epah
- State Deputy Chairman:
  - Perlis: Gan Ay Ling
  - Kedah: Mohammed Taufiq Johari
  - Kelantan: Asharun Uji
  - Terengganu: Mohd Johari Mohamad
  - Penang: Goh Choon Aik
  - Perak: Tan Kar Hing
  - Pahang: Sim Chon Siang
  - Selangor: Borhan Aman Shah
  - Federal Territories: Fikri Aziz
  - Negeri Sembilan: Muhammad Nazri Kassim
  - Malacca: Mohd Khuzaire Mohd Kamal (Acting)
  - Johor: Md Ysahrudin Kusni
  - Sabah: Peto Galim
  - Sarawak: Chiew Choon Man

== Leadership ==
=== President ===
No.	Name	Term of office		Mandates
1	Wan Azizah Wan Ismail	4 April 1999	17 November 2018	1st (2001); 2nd (2004); 3rd (2007); 4th (2010); 5th (2014)
2	Anwar Ibrahim	17 November 2018	Incumbent	6th (2018); 7th (2022); 8th (2025)

=== Deputy President ===
No.	Name	Term of office		Mandates
1	Chandra Muzaffar	4 April 1999	11 November 2001	–
2	Abdul Rahman Othman	11 November 2001	18 December 2004	1st (2001)
3	Syed Husin Ali	18 December 2004	28 November 2010	2nd (2004); 3rd (2007)
4	Azmin Ali	28 November 2010	24 February 2020	4th (2010); 5th (2014); 6th (2018)
-	Vacant	24 February 2020	17 July 2022	-
5	Rafizi Ramli	17 July 2022	24 May 2025	7th (2022)
6	Nurul Izzah Anwar	24 May 2025	Incumbent	8th (2025)

=== Women's Chief ===
No.	Name	Term of office		Mandates
1	Nell @ Azah Onn	4 April 1999	4 November 1999	–
2	Fuziah Salleh	4 November 1999	27 May 2007	1st (2001); 2nd (2004)
3	Zuraida Kamaruddin	27 May 2007	18 November 2018	3rd (2007); 4th (2010); 5th (2014)
4	Haniza Talha	18 November 2018	29 June 2020	6th (2018)
-	Vacant	29 June 2020	11 July 2020	-
5	Fuziah Salleh	11 July 2020	4 July 2022	–
6	Fadhlina Sidek	4 July 2022	Incumbent	7th (2022); 8th (2025)

=== Youth Chief ===
No.	Name	Term of office		Mandates
1	Ezam Mohd Nor	4 April 1999	30 October 2006	1st (2001); 2nd (2004)
2	Shamsul Iskandar Mohd Akin	30 October 2006	22 August 2014	3rd (2007); 4th (2010)
3	Nik Nazmi Nik Ahmad	22 August 2014	16 November 2018	5th (2014)
4	Akmal Nasir	16 November 2018	17 July 2022	6th (2018)
5	Adam Adli Abd Halim	17 July 2022	23 May 2025	7th (2022)
6	Kamil Munim	24 May 2025	Incumbent	8th (2025)

== Elected representatives ==
=== Dewan Negara (Senate) ===
==== Senators ====
- His Majesty's appointee:
  - Saifuddin Nasution Ismail
  - Saraswathy Kandasami
  - Fuziah Salleh
  - Niran Tan Kran
  - Abun Sui Anyit
  - Isaiah Jacob (Kuala Lumpur)
- Negeri Sembilan State Legislative Assembly:
  - Jufitri Joha
- Penang State Legislative Assembly:
  - Noor Inayah Ya'akub
- Perak State Legislative Assembly:
  - Mohamad Hairul Amir Sabri
- Selangor State Legislative Assembly:
  - Mohammad Redzuan Othman

=== Dewan Rakyat (House of Representatives) ===
==== Members of Parliament of the 15th Malaysian Parliament ====
PKR has 27 members in the House of Representatives.

State	No.	Parliament Constituency	Member	Party
Kedah	P015	Sungai Petani	Mohammed Taufiq Johari	PKR
Penang	P047	Nibong Tebal	Fadhlina Sidek	PKR
Penang	P052	Bayan Baru	Sim Tze Tzin	PKR
Penang	P053	Balik Pulau	Muhammad Bakhtiar Wan Chik	PKR
Perak	P062	Sungai Siput	Kesavan Subramaniam	PKR
Perak	P063	Tambun	Anwar Ibrahim	PKR
Perak	P071	Gopeng	Tan Kar Hing	PKR
Perak	P077	Tanjong Malim	Chang Lih Kang	PKR
Selangor	P097	Selayang	William Leong Jee Keen	PKR
Selangor	P098	Gombak	Amirudin Shari	PKR
Selangor	P099	Ampang	~~Rodziah Ismail~~	PKR
Selangor	P107	Sungai Buloh	Ramanan Ramakrishnan	PKR
Kuala Lumpur	P115	Batu	Prabakaran Parameswaran	PKR
Kuala Lumpur	P116	Wangsa Maju	Zahir Hassan	PKR
Kuala Lumpur	P121	Lembah Pantai	Fahmi Fadzil	PKR
Kuala Lumpur	P124	Bandar Tun Razak	Wan Azizah Wan Ismail	PKR
Negeri Sembilan	P132	Port Dickson	Aminuddin Harun	PKR
Malacca	P137	Hang Tuah Jaya	Adam Adli Abdul Halim	PKR
Johor	P140	Segamat	Yuneswaran Ramaraj	PKR
Johor	P141	Sekijang	Zaliha Mustafa	PKR
Johor	P144	Ledang	Syed Ibrahim Syed Noh	PKR
Johor	P150	Batu Pahat	Onn Abu Bakar	PKR
Johor	P158	Tebrau	Jimmy Puah Wee Tse	PKR
Johor	P159	Pasir Gudang	Hassan Abdul Karim	PKR
Johor	P160	Johor Bahru	Akmal Nasrullah Mohd Nasir	PKR
Sabah	P171	Sepanggar	Mustapha Sakmud	PKR
Sarawak	P219	Miri	Chiew Choon Man	PKR
Total	Kedah (1), Penang (3), Perak (4), Selangor (4), F.T. Kuala Lumpur (4), Negeri Sembilan (1), Malacca (1), Johor (7), Sabah (1), Sarawak (1)			

=== Dewan Undangan Negeri (State Legislative Assembly) ===
==== Malaysian State Assembly Representatives ====
Selangor State Legislative Assembly
12 / 56
Penang State Legislative Assembly
7 / 40
Negeri Sembilan State Legislative Assembly
2 / 36
Perak State Legislative Assembly
5 / 59
Perlis State Legislative Assembly
1 / 15
Pahang State Legislative Assembly
3 / 47
Kedah State Legislative Assembly
2 / 36
Sabah State Legislative Assembly
2 / 79
Johor State Legislative Assembly
1 / 56
Sarawak State Legislative Assembly
0 / 82
Malacca State Legislative Assembly
0 / 28
Kelantan State Legislative Assembly
0 / 45
Terengganu State Legislative Assembly
0 / 33

State	No.	Parliament Constituency	No.	State Constituency	Member	Party
Perlis	P002	Kangar	N08	Indera Kayangan	Gan Ay Ling	PKR
Kedah	P015	Sungai Petani	N28	Bakar Arang	Adam Loh Wei Chai	PKR
Kedah	P015	Sungai Petani	N29	Sidam	Bau Wong Bau Ek	PKR
Penang	P045	Bukit Mertajam	N14	Machang Bubok	Lee Khai Loon	PKR
Penang	P046	Batu Kawan	N17	Bukit Tengah	Gooi Hsiao-Leung	PKR
Penang	P046	Batu Kawan	N18	Bukit Tambun	Goh Choon Aik	PKR
Penang	P048	Bukit Bendera	N24	Kebun Bunga	Lee Boon Heng	PKR
Penang	P052	Bayan Baru	N35	Batu Uban	Kumaresan Aramugam	PKR
Penang	P052	Bayan Baru	N36	Pantai Jerejak	Fahmi Zainol	PKR
Penang	P052	Bayan Baru	N37	Batu Maung	Mohamad Abdul Hamid	PKR
Perak	P063	Tambun	N24	Hulu Kinta	Muhamad Arafat Varisai Mahamad	PKR
Perak	P070	Kampar	N43	Tulang Sekah	Mohd Azlan Helmi	PKR
Perak	P071	Gopeng	N45	Simpang Pulai	Wong Chai Yi	PKR
Perak	P071	Gopeng	N46	Teja	Sandrea Ng Shy Ching	PKR
Perak	P075	Bagan Datuk	N54	Hutan Melintang	Wasanthee Sinnasamy	PKR
Pahang	P082	Indera Mahkota	N13	Semambu	Chan Chun Kuang	PKR
Pahang	P083	Kuantan	N14	Teruntum	Sim Chon Siang	PKR
Pahang			—	Nominated Member	Rizal Jamin	PKR
Selangor	P097	Selayang	N14	Rawang	Chua Wei Kiat	PKR
Selangor	P098	Gombak	N16	Sungai Tua	Amirudin Shari	PKR
Selangor	P099	Ampang	N19	Bukit Antarabangsa	Mohd Kamri Kamaruddin	PKR
Selangor	P099	Ampang	N20	Lembah Jaya	Syed Ahmad Syed Abdul Rahman Al-Hadad	PKR
Selangor	P102	Bangi	N25	Kajang	David Cheong Kian Young	PKR
Selangor	P105	Petaling Jaya	N32	Seri Setia	Mohammad Fahmi Ngah	PKR
Selangor	P106	Damansara	N37	Bukit Lanjan	Pua Pei Ling	PKR
Selangor	P107	Sungai Buloh	N39	Kota Damansara	Izuan Kasim	PKR
Selangor	P108	Shah Alam	N40	Kota Anggerik	Najwan Halimi	PKR
Selangor	P110	Klang	N46	Pelabuhan Klang	Azmizam Zaman Huri	PKR
Selangor	P111	Kota Raja	N48	Sentosa	Gunarajah George	PKR
Selangor	P113	Sepang	N51	Tanjong Sepat	Borhan Aman Shah	PKR
Negeri Sembilan	P132	Port Dickson	N29	Chuah	Yew Boon Lye	PKR
Negeri Sembilan	P132	Port Dickson	N33	Sri Tanjung	Rajasekaran Gunnasekaran	PKR
Johor	P158	Tebrau	N41	Puteri Wangsa	Maszlee Malik	PKR
Sabah	P181	Tenom	N42	Melalap	Jamawi Ja'afar	PKR
Sabah	-			Nominated Member	Grace Lee Li Mei	PKR
Total	Perlis (1), Kedah (2), Penang (7), Perak (5), Pahang (3), Selangor (12), Negeri Sembilan (2), Johor (1), Sabah (2)					

== Government offices ==
=== Ministerial posts ===
Portfolio	Office bearer	Constituency
Prime Minister	Anwar Ibrahim	(Perak) Tambun
Minister of Finance	Anwar Ibrahim	(Perak) Tambun
Minister of Home Affairs	Saifuddin Nasution Ismail	Senator
Minister of Economy	Akmal Nasir	Johor Bahru
Minister of Education	Fadhlina Sidek	(Penang) Nibong Tebal
Minister of Youth and Sports	Mohammed Taufiq Johari	(Kedah) Sungai Petani
Minister of Human Resources	Ramanan Ramakrishnan	(Selangor) Sungai Buloh
Minister of Science, Technology and Innovation	Chang Lih Kang	(Perak) Tanjong Malim
Minister of Communications	Fahmi Fadzil	(Kuala Lumpur) Lembah Pantai
Minister in the Prime Minister's Department (Sabah and Sarawak Affairs)	Mustapha Sakmud	(Sabah) Sepanggar

Portfolio	Office bearer	Constituency
Deputy Minister of Investment, Trade and Industry	Sim Tze Tzin	(Penang) Bayan Baru
Deputy Minister of Natural Resources and Environmental Sustainability	Syed Ibrahim Syed Noh	(Johor) Ledang
Deputy Minister of Tourism, Arts and Culture	Chiew Choon Man	(Sarawak) Miri
Deputy Minister of Higher Education	Adam Adli Abdul Halim	(Malacca) Hang Tuah Jaya
Deputy Minister of Domestic Trade and Costs of Living	Fuziah Salleh	Senator
Deputy Minister of National Unity	Yuneswaran Ramaraj	(Johor) Segamat

=== State governments ===
PKR currently leads the government of Selangor and Negeri Sembilan and served as junior partner in several states governed by Pakatan Harapan, GRS and Barisan Nasional

- Selangor (2008–2014, 2014–present)
- Negeri Sembilan (2018–2026)
- Penang (2008–present)
- Pahang (2022–present)
- Perak (2008–2009, 2018–2020, 2022–present)
- Malacca (2018–2020, 2022–present)
- Sabah (2018–2020, 2022–present)
- Johor (2018–2020)
- Kedah (2008–2013, 2018–2020)
- Kelantan (2008–2015)

Note: bold as Menteri Besar/Chief Minister, italic as junior partner

State	Position	Office bearer	State constituency
Selangor	Menteri Besar	Amirudin Shari	Sungai Tua

State	Position	Office bearer	State constituency
Penang	Deputy Chief Minister I	Mohamad Abdul Hamid	Batu Maung

=== Legislative leadership ===
Position	Office bearer	Constituency
Speaker of the Dewan Rakyat	Johari Abdul	Non-MP

State	Position	Office bearer	State constituency
Penang	Speaker	Law Choo Kiang	Non-MLA
Selangor	Deputy Speaker	Mohd Kamri Kamaruddin	Bukit Antarabangsa

=== Official opposition ===
State	Position	Office bearer	State constituency
Kedah	Opposition Leader	Bau Wong Bau Ek	Sidam
Perlis	Opposition Leader	Gan Ay Ling	Indera Kayangan

== Election results ==
=== General election results ===
Dewan Rakyat
Election	Leader	Votes		Seats				Position (Note: As part of electoral coalition.)	Government
Election	Leader	No.	Share	Won	Contested	±	Share	Position	Government
1999	Wan Azizah Wan Ismail	773,679	11.7%	5 / 193	5 / 78	▲5	2.6%	2nd (Barisan Alternatif)	Barisan Nasional
2004	Wan Azizah Wan Ismail	617,518	8.9%	1 / 219	1 / 80	▼4	0.5%	▼3rd (Barisan Alternatif)	Barisan Nasional
2008	Wan Azizah Wan Ismail	1,509,080	18.6%	31 / 222	31 / 84	▲30	14.0%	▲2nd (Pakatan Rakyat)	Barisan Nasional
2013	Anwar Ibrahim	2,254,211	20.4%	30 / 222	30 / 99	▼1	13.5%	2nd (Pakatan Rakyat)	Barisan Nasional
2018	Wan Azizah Wan Ismail	2,046,394	16.9%	47 / 222	47 / 70	▲17	21.2%	▲1st (Pakatan Harapan)	Pakatan Harapan (Note: Majority government (2018–2020); Opposition (2020–2022).)
2022	Anwar Ibrahim	2,442,038	15.7%	31 / 222	31 / 100	▼16	14.0%	1st (Pakatan Harapan)	Pakatan Harapan–Barisan Nasional (Note: Coalition government.)

=== State election results ===
State assembly	Election	Votes	%	Seats	Won/contested	+/–	Position (Note: As part of electoral coalition.)	Status
Perlis	2022	19,270	13.0	1 / 15	1 / 9	▼2	2nd (Pakatan Harapan)	Opposition
Kedah	2023	150,863	13.0	2 / 36	2 / 10	▼5	▼2nd (Pakatan Harapan)	Opposition
Kelantan	2023	41,572	4.9	0 / 45	0 / 7	Steady	3rd (Pakatan Harapan)	No seats
Terengganu	2023	9,476	1.4	0 / 32	0 / 3	Steady	3rd (Pakatan Harapan)	No seats
Penang	2023	202,522	22.8	7 / 40	7 / 13	▼7	1st (Pakatan Harapan)	PH–BN
Perak	2022	162,988	11.0	5 / 59	5 / 21	▲1	▼2nd (Pakatan Harapan)	BN–PH
Pahang	2022	69,118	8.0	2 / 42	2 / 17	Steady	▼3rd (Pakatan Harapan)	BN–PH
Selangor	2023	582,591	21.7	12 / 56	12 / 20	▼9	1st (Pakatan Harapan)	PH–BN
Negeri Sembilan	2026	78,696	12.3	2 / 36	2 / 16	▼3	▼2nd (Pakatan Harapan)	Opposition
Malacca	2026	40,701	8.3	0 / 28	0 / 10	Steady	2nd (Pakatan Harapan)	No seats
Johor	2026	157,556	8.4	1 / 56	1 / 20	Steady	2nd (Pakatan Harapan)	Balancing force
Sabah	2025	38,156	3.4	1 / 73	1 / 13	▼1	▼6th (Pakatan Harapan)	GRS–PH–BN
Sarawak	2021	19,865	2.7	0 / 82	0 / 28	▼3	▼3rd (Pakatan Harapan)	No seats

Note

State election	State Legislative Assembly													
State election	Perlis	Kedah	Kelantan	Terengganu	Penang	Perak	Pahang	Selangor	Negeri Sembilan	Malacca	Johor	Sabah	Sarawak	Seats won / contested
2/3 majority	2 / 3	2 / 3	2 / 3	2 / 3	2 / 3	2 / 3	2 / 3	2 / 3	2 / 3	2 / 3	2 / 3	2 / 3	2 / 3	
1999	0 / 15	0 / 36	0 / 43	0 / 32	1 / 33	1 / 52	1 / 38	1 / 48	0 / 32	0 / 25	0 / 40	0 / 48		4 / 70
2001													0 / 62	0 / 25
2004	0 / 15	0 / 36	0 / 45	0 / 32	0 / 40	0 / 59	0 / 42	0 / 56	0 / 36	0 / 28	0 / 56	0 / 60		0 / 121
2006													1 / 71	1 / 25
2008	0 / 15	4 / 36	1 / 45	0 / 32	9 / 40	7 / 59	0 / 42	15 / 56	4 / 36	0 / 28	0 / 56	0 / 60		40 / 176
2011													3 / 71	3 / 49
2013	1 / 15	4 / 36	1 / 45	1 / 32	10 / 40	5 / 59	2 / 42	14 / 56	3 / 36	0 / 28	1 / 56	7 / 60		49 / 172
2016													3 / 82	5 / 40
2018	3 / 15	7 / 36	0 / 45	0 / 32	14 / 40	4 / 59	2 / 42	21 / 56	6 / 36	3 / 28	5 / 56	2 / 60		70 / 172
2020												2 / 73		2 / 7
2021										0 / 28			0 / 82	0 / 39
2022	1 / 15					5 / 59	2 / 42				1 / 56			9 / 65
2023		2 / 36	0 / 45	0 / 32	7 / 40			12 / 56	5 / 36					26 / 59
2025												1 / 73		1 / 13
2026									2 / 36	0 / 28	1 / 56		0 / 82	3 / 46

== See also ==
- List of political parties in Malaysia
- Malaysian General Election
- Politics of Malaysia
- Pakatan Rakyat
- Pakatan Harapan
