= 2010 People's Justice Party leadership election =

Election in a political party in Malaysia

2010 People's Justice Party presidential election
- 16 October – 25 November 2010
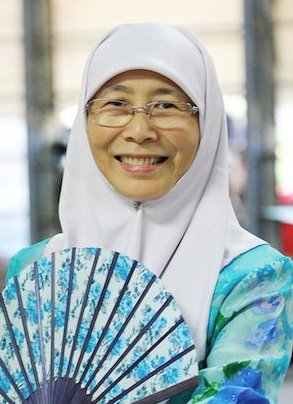
Candidate	Wan Azizah Wan Ismail
Popular vote	Unopposed
President before election
Wan Azizah Wan Ismail
Elected President
Wan Azizah Wan Ismail

A leadership election was held by the People's Justice Party (PKR) from 16 October to 25 November 2010. It was won by the incumbent president, Wan Azizah Wan Ismail.

== Timeline ==
Dates	Events
16 October 2010	Nominations opened at 10:00 UTC and close at 18:00 UTC
20 October 2010	Deadline for objections and withdrawal of nomination papers
24 October 2010	List of final candidates revealed
31 October 2010	Ballots of members opened
25 November 2010	Ballots of members closed
28 November 2010	Results announced

== Nominations and results ==
=== Central Leadership Council (MPP) ===
==== President ====
Candidate	Members' votes
Wan Azizah Wan Ismail	Unopposed

==== Deputy President ====
Candidate	Members' votes
Mohamed Azmin Ali	19,543
Mustaffa Kamil Ayub	4,567 (Note: Unofficial, as of 22 November 2010.)
Zaid Ibrahim	Withdrew

==== Vice Presidents ====
Candidate	Members' votes (max. 4)
Nurul Izzah Anwar	13,211
Chua Tian Chang	11,744
Fuziah Salleh	8,927
Mansor Othman	8,576
Gobalakrishnan Nagapan	Lost (Note: Candidates sorted by result ranking.)
Xavier Jayakumar Arulanandam	Lost
Sivarasa Rasiah	Lost
Suresh Kumar Ramachandran	Lost
Mohd Yahya Mat Sahri	Lost
Manikavasagam Sundaram	Lost
Ansari Abdullah	Lost
Baru Bian	Lost
Dominique Ng Kim Ho	Lost
Jimmy Donald	Lost
Yusmadi Yusoff	Lost
Jonson Chong	Lost
Abdullah Sani Abdul Hamid	Lost
James Ghani	Lost
Saiman Marjuki	Lost

==== Central Leadership Council Members ====
Candidate	Members' votes (max. 20)
Elizabeth Wong Keat Peng	10,897
Badrulamin Bahron	9,672
Hee Loy Sian	8,473
Khalid Jaafar	7,889
Johari Abdul	7,719
Abdul Rahman Yusof	7,719
Haniza Talha	7,588
Fariz Musa	7,511
Zakaria Abdul Hamid	7,170
Roland Chia Ming Shen	7,095
Siti Aishah Shaik Ismail	6,876
Ismail Yusop	6,332
Latheefa Beebi Koya	6,242
Kesavan Subramaniam	6,139
Shuhaimi Shafiei	6,095
M. R. Summugam	5,964
Yusmadi Yusoff	5,810
Manikumar Subramanian	5,789
Mustafa Kamal Yusoff	5,745
Christina Liew	5,707
Abdul Halim Hussain	Lost
Zamri Yusuf	Lost
Fellicia Ling	Lost
Amran Ab Ghani	Lost
Krishnasamy Ponnusamy	Lost
Azman Abidin	Lost
Yaakob Sapari	Lost
Kalakau Untol	Lost
Ravi Munusamy	Lost
Nik Mahmood Nik Hassan	Lost
A. Ram Ponnusamy	Lost
Aminuddin Harun	Lost
Dominique Ng Kim Ho	Lost
Nicholas Bawin	Lost
Streram Sinnasamy	Lost
Abdul Malik Kassim	Lost
Anthony Mandiau	Lost
Kamel Yassin	Lost
Azan Ismail	Lost
Chai Tong Chai	Lost
Zulkifly Ibrahim	Lost
Murali Subramaniam	Lost
Selvarajan Rathinam	Lost
Tai Sing Ng	Lost
V. Sivam	Lost
Syed Hamid Ali	Lost
Wan Salleh Wan Isa	Lost
Salma Ismail	Lost
Raman Elangkoban	Lost
Ramle Dua	Lost
Ahmad Nizam Hamid	Lost
Hasnah Hashim	Lost
Krishnamoothy Rajannaidu	Lost
Abas Awang	Lost
Awang Tengah	Lost

=== Central Women’s Leadership Council (MPWP) ===
==== Women's Chief ====
Candidate	Members' votes
Zuraida Kamaruddin	5,835
Suraya Sudin	1,453
Animah Ferrar	1,310

==== Deputy Women's Chief ====
Candidate	Members' votes
Rodziah Ismail	6,515
Asmah Abd Kadir	1,591

==== Vice Women's Chiefs ====
Candidate	Members' votes
Gan Pei Nei	4,363
Haniza Talha	4,162
Noor Sham Abu Samah	3,329
Aisah Lamsah	Lost (Note: Candidates sorted alphabetically)
Begum Jan Abdullah	Lost
Felicia Ling	Lost
Rosmah Suly	Lost
Rozaini Mohd Rosli	Lost
Salma Ismail	Lost

=== Central Youth Leadership Council (MPAMKP) ===
==== Youth Chief ====
Candidate	Members' votes
Shamsul Iskandar Mohd Akin	Won
Badrul Hisham Shaharin	Lost
Rafizi Ramli	Withdrew
Hasmi Hashim	Disqualified

==== Deputy Youth Chief ====
Candidate	Members' votes
Khairul Anuar Ahmad Zainuddin	Won
Chang Lih Kang	Lost
Amirudin Shari	Withdrew

==== Vice Youth Chiefs ====
Candidate	Members' votes
Azmizam Zaman Huri	Won
Erveana Ansari Ali	Won
Chan Ming Kai	Won
Abdul Yunus Jamahri	Lost
Farhash Wafa Salvador	Lost
Lee Khai Loon	Lost
Nazree Yunus	Lost
Nicholas Guntobon	Lost
Rozan Azen Mat Rasip	Lost
Kesavan Subramaniam	Lost
Sivam Veeramuthu	Lost
Sim Tze Tzin	Withdrew
