= Ruslan Kasim =

Malaysian politician

Datuk Ruslan Kasim

Personal details
- Born: Ruslan bin Kassim Negeri Sembilan, Federation of Malaya
- Died: 17 September 2020 Selayang, Selangor, Malaysia
- Resting place: Batang Kali Cemetery, Selangor, Malaysia
- Party: UMNO (before 1998, 2004–2018); KeADILan (1999–2004); PKR (2004); BERSATU (2018–2020)
- Other political affiliations: Barisan Nasional (before 1998, 2004–2018); Barisan Alternatif (1999–2004); Pakatan Harapan (2018–2020)
- Occupation: Politician

Ruslan Kassim (also spelled Ruslan Kasim; died 17 September 2020) was a Malaysian politician from Negeri Sembilan who served as the inaugural Information Chief for the National Justice Party (KeADILan). Prior to the late 1990s, Ruslan was an active figure in the United Malays National Organisation (UMNO), where he served as the Negeri Sembilan UMNO Youth Chief and worked closely alongside future Deputy Prime Minister Ahmad Zahid Hamidi. However, following the 1998 political crisis, he was expelled from the ruling party due to his support for ousted Deputy Prime Minister Anwar Ibrahim. As a prominent figure of the Reformasi movement and a co-founder of KeADILan, he led the party's Negeri Sembilan chapter and was subsequently detained under the Internal Security Act (ISA) for his political activism.

Following the merger of KeADILan with the Malaysian People's Party (PRM), Ruslan fell out with the new leadership, leading to his return to UMNO in 2004. During his time back in the ruling coalition, he became active in Malay civil advocacy, aligning himself with the right-wing nationalist non-governmental organisation, Pertubuhan Pribumi Perkasa Malaysia (PERKASA), serving as its Information Chief. However, following the 2018 general election, he left UMNO once more to join the Malaysian United Indigenous Party (BERSATU), returning to support Anwar Ibrahim's political struggle until his death in 2020.

== Political career ==
=== Early years and Reformasi movement ===
Ruslan began his political career through the Negeri Sembilan UMNO Youth, rising to become the chief of the state chapter's youth wing. Within the party, he was a political ally of Deputy Prime Minister Anwar Ibrahim and Ahmad Zahid Hamidi, working closely with them as an executive committee member of the national UMNO Youth. During the 1998 UMNO General Assembly at the Putra World Trade Centre (PWTC), he openly questioned the publication and distribution of the defamatory book, 50 Dalil Mengapa Anwar Tidak Boleh Jadi PM ("50 Reasons Why Anwar Cannot Become PM"), written by Khalid Jafri. The publication of the book was linked to Abdul Rahim Thamby Chik and his wife, Zabedah Abdullah. He was then expelled from UMNO in the resulting 1998 political crisis due to his vocal support for Anwar, who had been dismissed on 2 September 1998. Following Anwar's arrest and removal, Ruslan was among the individuals detained under the Internal Security Act (ISA). His detainment took place during a raid at Anwar's residence in Jalan Setiamurni, Damansara, where he was physically assaulted by two police officers.

Through his active involvement in the Reformasi movement, Ruslan became a founding member of the National Justice Party (KeADILan) alongside Anwar Ibrahim in 1999. Due to his organisational influence in Negeri Sembilan, he was appointed to lead the party's state chapter and concurrently served as the inaugural Information Chief. In the 1999 general election, Ruslan made his electoral debut by contesting the Kuala Pilah constituency, representing the Barisan Alternatif (BA) opposition coalition. He secured 13,676 votes (45.3%) narrowly losing by 2,818 votes to the Barisan Nasional (BN) candidate, Napsiah Omar, who received 16,494 votes (54.7%). He heavily overperformed, coming close in a traditionally safe UMNO seat where the ruling party won 86.3% of vote in the previous election.

Following the death of incumbent Member of Parliament S. A. Anpalagan on 28 April 2000, a by-election was triggered for the Dewan Rakyat seat of Telok Kemang. KeADILan selected Ruslan as its candidate to challenge the ruling coalition in his home state. Nomination day took place on 30 May, establishing a two-cornered fight against the BN nominee, S. Sothinathan, who was the political secretary to the Malaysian Indian Congress (MIC) president. The campaign was intensely fought amidst a wave of local defections, where several KeADILan leaders in neighbouring Selangor publicly resigned to rejoin UMNO. The defections placed additional political pressure on Ruslan’s machinery, with the by-election concluding on 10 June with a narrow win for Barisan Nasional. Sothinathan retained the seat with a majority of 5,972 votes, securing 24,500 votes against 18,528 votes for Ruslan. Despite the defeat, Ruslan's performance was viewed as a strategic victory for the opposition. He significantly reduced BN's previous majority of 9,942 votes from the 1999 election by nearly 4,000 votes, indicating a notable swing in voter sentiment. Notably, Ruslan won in the Chinese-majority state constituency of Lukut, a subdivision of the parliamentary seat that had been heavily devastated by the 1999 Nipah virus outbreak. This reversed a previous opposition loss in the area into a localised majority of 297 votes.

During the 2001 leadership elections, Ruslan contested the position of vice president alongside Anuar Tahir and Gobalakrishnan Nagapan, running as a slate representing the ABIM faction. Throughout the campaign, tensions grew over the perceived dominance of the faction, which represented the Islamic organisation that Anwar once led. While Ruslan publicly denied the narrative of a hostile "ABIM vs. non-ABIM" split, the election ultimately solidified into a factional proxy war, with the group being opposed by a loose coalition of reform activists, social liberals, and ex-UMNO politicians. Following the vote count on 10 November, the ABIM faction suffered a sweeping defeat across the top leadership positions. In the vice-presidential race, Ruslan Kasim narrowly missed the top-three cutoff, securing 527 votes and finishing fourth behind Azmin Ali, Tian Chua, and Sheikh Azmi Ahmad, all of whom were affiliated with the non-ABIM faction. Meanwhile, Muhammad Nur Manuty narrowly lost the deputy presidency to Abdul Rahman Othman, and Mustaffa Kamil Ayub lost his position as deputy youth chief to Saifuddin Nasution Ismail. During the campaign, critics successfully painted the ABIM faction as conservative figures who would struggle to connect with non-Muslims or dominate the reformist agenda.

The immediate aftermath of the election was highly contentious. To promote party unity and close ranks, KeADILan president Wan Azizah Wan Ismail offered appointed positions on the party’s supreme council to the four defeated ABIM leaders. However, Ruslan Kasim collectively rejected the appointments along with Muhammad Nur Manuty, Anuar Tahir, and Mustaffa Kamil Ayub. They defended the decision by expressng their desire to give the newly elected leadership a clear mandate without accusations of being "power-hungry". Anuar Tahir explicitly noted that the move was done to protect ABIM’s reputation, which he claimed had been "dragged through the mud" during the aggressive campaigning. The rejection triggered a war of words within KeADILan, with Supreme council member Abd Rahman Yusof publicly criticising the group as "bitter" and "undemocratic" for not accepting their defeat. Conversely, external ABIM leadership warned that the marginalisation of its members signalled that they had no future within KeADILan. Rumors and internal friction persisted through the end of 2001, with pro-ABIM party workers allegedly facing dismissals and hostility at the party secretariat.

=== Return to UMNO ===
The 2001 fallout structurally shifted KeADILan away from the heavy influence of the ABIM network, paving the way for the party's eventual merger with the socialist Malaysian People's Party (PRM) in 2003. The merger transformed KeADILan into the more pluralistic and secular-leaning People's Justice Party (PKR). Disillusioned by the internal dynamics, Ruslan Kasim eventually left PKR and led a group of 12 other party leaders in returning to UMNO on 12 February 2004. The group included Zahid Arip, Hamdan Taha, Abdul Wahid Ahmad Suhaimie, Mohamed Hanafiah Man, Fakhrul Azman Abu Bakar, Shamsul Bahari Shamsuddin, Rosli Mohamed Johar, Zainuddin Awang, Bujang Ulis, Rusli Mohd Shariff and Jeffry Nizam. They submitted their UMNO membership forms to Prime Minister Abdullah Ahmad Badawi in Putrajaya. His departure significantly impacted the opposition's regional machinery, prompting the Negeri Sembilan UMNO Youth to assert that KeADILan's footprint in the state had effectively "closed its books".

Apart from party politics, Ruslan served as the Information Chief for the Malay non-governmental organisation (NGO), Pertubuhan Pribumi Perkasa Malaysia (PERKASA). He declared the organisation's support for the Malaysian Islamic Consumers Association (PPIM) campaign against illegal gambling. He was also highly critical of several opposition leaders and civil society organisations. He labelled Marina Mahathir as "Melayu mudah lupa" (forgetful Malay)—a reference to a poem by her father, Mahathir Mohamad—following her support for the Bersih 2.0 rally. He also dismissed the aspirations of the Kelantan Menteri Besar, Nik Abdul Aziz Nik Mat, to become Prime Minister, and challenged Kelantan State Executive Councillor Husam Musa to sue blogger Syed Azidi Syed Abdul Aziz. Husam was previously accused of giving RM350,000 to Syed Azidi to settle outstanding costs and compensation after the latter's contract with the Kelantan Menteri Besar Corporation (PMBK) was terminated on 10 November 2009. Following these allegations, Husam filed a RM5 million defamation suit against Syed Azidi at the High Court of Malaya in Kota Bharu on 19 September 2011.

=== Later political career ===
Following the 2018 general election, Ruslan left UMNO once again in June to join the Malaysian United Indigenous Party (BERSATU). Recognising his extensive history in Negeri Sembilan politics, BERSATU appointed him as the acting Jempol Division Chief. Ahead of the 2018 Port Dickson by-election later that year, Ruslan transitioned back into the reformist fold. During an election campaign speech in Telok Kemang, he publicly declared his return to supporting Anwar Ibrahim and began actively campaigning on his behalf. Reflecting on his volatile career path, Ruslan stated that he desired to assist the newly established government and admitted to feeling "deceived" during his second stint with UMNO. He offered a sincere, formal apology to Anwar for his past political criticisms and actions during his years away from the opposition. Anwar publicly accepted the apology, telling him to leave past grievances behind. He encouraged Ruslan to join forces with the broader Pakatan Harapan ruling coalition, a political realignment Ruslan continuously championed while managing his division in Jempol until his death in September 2020.

== Election results ==
Parliament of Malaysia
Year	Constituency	Candidate	Votes	Pct	Opponent(s)	Votes	Pct	Ballots cast	Majority	Turnout
1999	P116 Kuala Pilah	Ruslan Kasim (KeADILan)	13,676	45.3%	Napsiah Omar (UMNO)	16,494	54.7%	30,170	2,818	71.14%
2000	P119 Telok Kemang	Ruslan Kasim (KeADILan)	18,528	43.0%	S. Sothinathan (MIC)	24,500	57.0%	43,028	5,972	66.14%

== Death ==
Ruslan died on 17 September 2020 at the Selayang Hospital in Selangor at approximately 2:00 pm. He was 65 years old and had been battling long-term heart and kidney complications prior to his death. Following his death, prominent figures across Malaysia's political spectrum offered their condolences. His close friend and president of PERKASA, Ibrahim Ali, paid tribute to his years of civil and political service. UMNO president Ahmad Zahid Hamidi, who once served alongside Ruslan in the UMNO Youth during the 1990s, also publicly extended his sympathies. His body was brought from the hospital following evening prayers, and his funeral was held later that night. Ruslan was buried around midnight at the Batang Kali Cemetery in Selangor.
