= 2014 People's Justice Party leadership election =

Election in a political party in Malaysia

2014 People's Justice Party presidential election
- 29 March – 10 August 2014
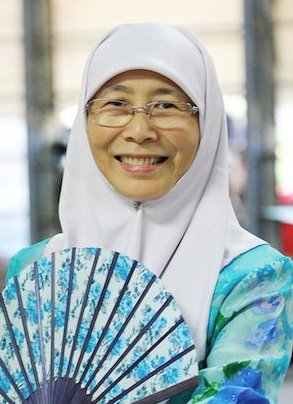
Candidate	Wan Azizah Wan Ismail
Popular vote	Unopposed
President before election
Wan Azizah Wan Ismail
Elected President
Wan Azizah Wan Ismail

2018 People's Justice Party deputy presidential election
- 29 March – 10 August 2014
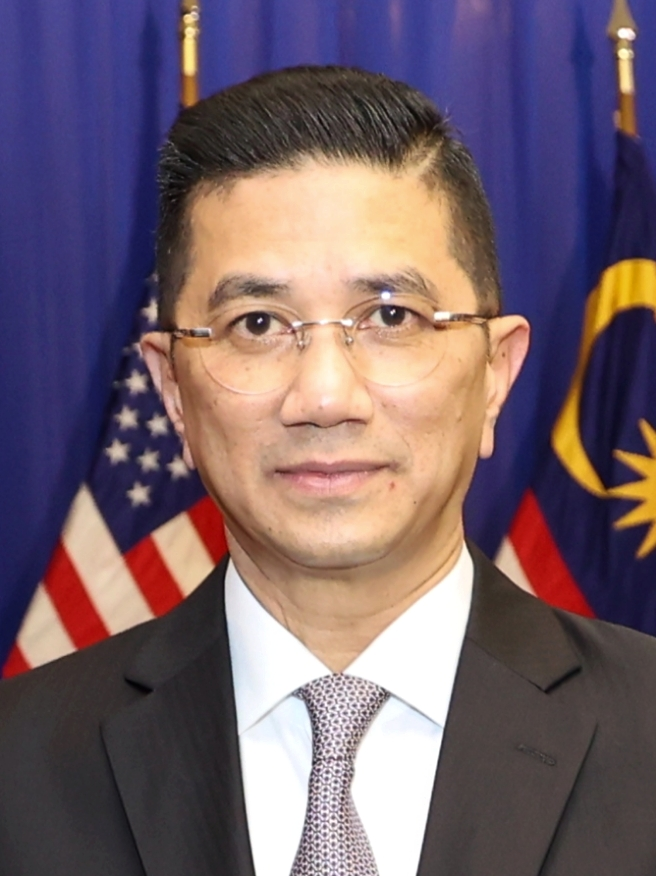

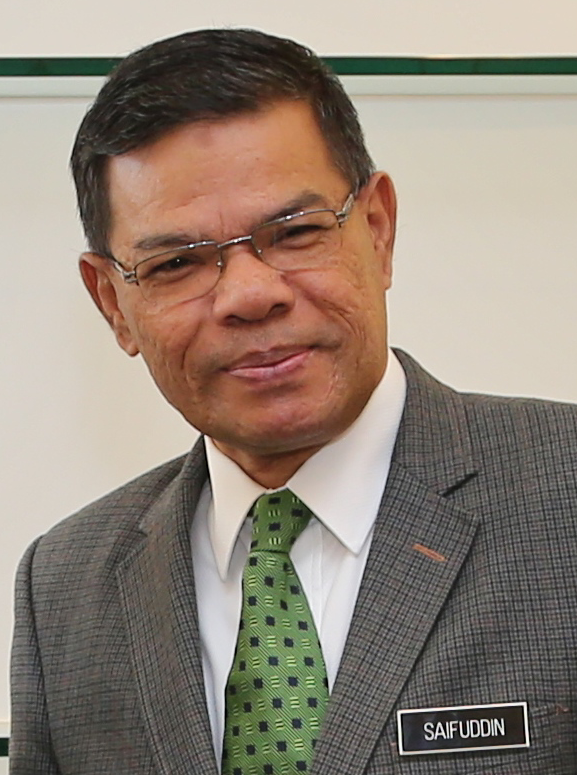
Candidate	Mohamed Azmin Ali	Saifuddin Nasution Ismail
Popular vote	22,562	10,743
Percentage	67.74%	32.26%
Deputy President before election
Mohamed Azmin Ali
Elected Deputy President
Mohamed Azmin Ali

A leadership election was held by the People's Justice Party (PKR) from 29 March until 10 August 2014. It was won by the incumbent president, Wan Azizah Wan Ismail.

== Timeline ==
Dates	Events
16 February 2014	Central Leadership Council (MPP) meeting
8 March 2014	Issue of election notice
29 March 2014	Nominations opened at 10:00 UTC and close at 17:00 UTC
1 April 2014	Issue of polling notice
4 April 2014	Deadline for objections to nomination papers
10 April 2014	Deadline for withdrawals of nomination
26 April 2014	Ballots of members opened
10 August 2014	Ballots of members closed
20 August 2014	Results announced

== Nominations and results ==
=== Central Leadership Council (MPP) ===
==== President ====
Candidate	Members' votes
Wan Azizah Wan Ismail	Unopposed

==== Deputy President ====
Candidate	Members' votes
Mohamed Azmin Ali	22,562
Saifuddin Nasution Ismail	10,743
Abdul Khalid Ibrahim	Disqualified

==== Vice Presidents ====
Candidate	Members' votes (max. 4)
Nurul Izzah Anwar	29,712
Chua Tian Chang	22,324
Shamsul Iskandar Mohd Akin	19,839
Rafizi Ramli	18,887
Xavier Jayakumar	18,434
Baru Bian	17,360
Fuziah Salleh	16,809
Lee Chin Cheh	14,948
Mustaffa Kamil Ayub	11,539
Suresh Kumar Ramachandran	7,294
Surendran Nagarajan	4,739
Mohd Yahya Mat Sahri	4,006
Summugam Rengasamy	3,269
Streram Sinnasamy	3,007

==== Central Leadership Council Members ====
Candidate	Members' votes (max. 20)
Latheefa Beebi Koya	23,119
Hee Loy Sian	22,743
Christina Liew	22,219
Fariz Musa	21,846
Elizabeth Wong Keat Ping	21,547
Ali Biju	21,304
Yaakob Sapari	21,024
Shuhaimi Shafiei	20,563
Manikavasagam Sundaram	20,259
Azmizam Zaman Huri	19,604
Siti Aishah Shaik Ismail	19,157
Abdul Yunus Jamahri	19,155
William Leong	19,129
Zakaria Abdul Hamid	18,739
Roland Chia Ming Shen	18,525
Khalid Jaafar	18,338
Manivannan Gowindasamy	18,252
Ravi Munusamy	18,171
Abdullah Sani Abdul Hamid	18,132
Gooi Hsiao-Leung	17,614
Sim Tze Tzin	17,542
Steven Choong Shiau Yoon	16,944
Ahmad Thamrin Mohd Jaini	16,487
Zahir Hassan	16,227
Zamri Yusuf	16,128
Mohamad Imran Abdul Hamid	15,977
Azman Nasrudin	15,900
Chai Tong Chai	15,884
Kesavan Subramaniam	15,305
David Cheong Kian Young	14,654
Abdul Halim Hussain	13,709
Wan Suhaimi Wan Daud	13,030
Mohd Khuzzan Abu Bakar	12,998
Yew Boon Lye	12,574
Mohamed Nazar Mohamed Yakin	12,303
Krishnasamy Punusamy	12,226
Zakaria Abd Rahim	10,851
Sureshkumar Ramachandran	10,791
Azizi Ayob	10,513
Kenny Chua Teck Ho	9,612
Suboh Ahmad	9,366
Borhan Aman Shah	9,344
Tamilarason K. Nadaysen	9,085
Zulkifly Ibrahim	8,931
Murali Subramaniam	8,859
Mustapha Sakmud	8,461
Rozmi Humaidi Zainal Abidin	8,153
James Ebi Ghani	7,686
Norizan Omar	7,399
Gunasekaran Kuppan	7,005
Rajan Rajan Naidu	6,402
Md Zaman Md Tasi	5,911
Sukumaran Krishnan	5,412
Ananthan Ramaya	4,527
Tai Sing Ng	4,429
Ibrahim Yaacob	4,246
Jayathas Sirkunavelu	4,086
Chandran Ramasamy	4,007
Mahendran Markandoo	3,355
Tan Ah Kow @ Tan Sie Wai	3,254
Keshminder Singh Karam Singh	3,072
Balasubramaniam Govindasamy	2,975
Mohamad Sofee Razak	2,296
Daniel Abdul Aziz	2,090
Ariffin Saidin	2,078
Abul Jais Ashfaq Ahmed	2,031
Gunarajah George	2,006
Badrul Zaman P. S. Md Zakariah	1,475
Samarudin Md Rejab	1,406
Rajasegaran Thangga Vilu	1,343
Thamil Kalai Sendinathan	1,205
Subramani Rengasamy	1,152
Yew Cheng Loon	756

=== Central Women’s Leadership Council (MPWP) ===
==== Women's Chief ====
Candidate	Members' votes
Zuraida Kamaruddin	9,392
Rodziah Ismail	9,109

==== Deputy Women's Chief ====
Candidate	Members' votes
Haniza Talha	8,910
Rusnah Aluai	8,145
Dayangku Intan	971

==== Vice Women's Chiefs ====
Candidate	Members' votes (max. 3)
Daroyah Alwi	9,034
Sivamalar Genapathy	8,603
Noor Sham Abu Samah	8,477
Gan Pei Nei	8,470
Tan Poh Lai	8,181
Johair Matlani	8,075

=== Central Youth Leadership Council (MPAMKP) ===
==== Youth Chief ====
Candidate	Members' votes
Nik Nazmi Nik Ahmad	4,509
Amirudin Shari	4,259
Nazree Yunus	2,213

==== Deputy Youth Chief ====
Candidate	Members' votes
Afif Bahardin	5,093
Chang Lih Kang	3,615
Mohd Serman Hassnar	1,689
Rames Kumar Theethan	593

==== Vice Youth Chiefs ====
Candidate	Members' votes (max. 3)
Raymond Ahuar	4,660
Mohd Radzlan Jalaludin	4,556
Sangetha Jayakumar	4,387
Nor Hizwan Ahmad	4,061
Mohd Saifullah Zulkifli	3,198
Sri Sanjeevan Ramakrishan	2,928
Ginie Lim Siew Lin	2,782
Carol Oolmela	2,472
Rajavigneswaran Maniraju	1,892
