= 2007 People's Justice Party leadership election =

Election in a political party in Malaysia

- 26 May 2007
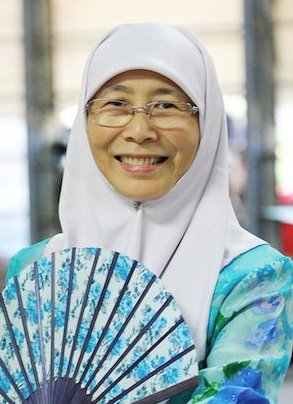
Candidate	Wan Azizah Wan Ismail
Popular vote	Unopposed
President before election
Wan Azizah Wan Ismail
Elected President
Wan Azizah Wan Ismail

A leadership election was held by the People's Justice Party (PKR) of Malaysia on 26 May 2007. It was won by the incumbent president, Wan Azizah Wan Ismail.

== Nominations and results ==
=== Central Leadership Council (MPP) ===
==== Permanent Chairman ====
Candidate	Delegates' votes
Hishammuddin Ismail	Unopposed

==== Deputy Permanent Chairman ====
Candidate	Delegates' votes
Khazizi Ahmad	642
Munawir Mahmud	342
Invalid	57

==== President ====
Candidate	Delegates' votes
Wan Azizah Wan Ismail	Unopposed
Anwar Ibrahim	Withdrew
Abdul Rahman Othman	Withdrew

==== Deputy President ====
Candidate	Delegates' votes
Syed Husin Ali	Unopposed

==== Vice Presidents ====
Candidate	Delegates' votes (max. 3)
Mohamed Azmin Ali	724
Lee Boon Chye	630
Mustaffa Kamil Ayub	604
Xavier Jayakumar Arulanandam	486
Fuziah Salleh	478
Jeffrey Kitingan	Withdrew
Invalid	21

==== Central Leadership Council Members ====
Candidate	Delegates' votes (max. 20)
Dominique Ng Kim Ho	822
Badrulamin Bahron	813
Mansor Othman	766
Sivarasa Rasiah	744
Gobalakrishnan Nagapan	676
Zaliha Mustafa	633
Mohd Yahya Mat Sahri	558
Johari Abdul	525
Irene Fernandez	512
Christina Liew	510
Usaili Alias	463
Zainal Abidin Ahmad	453
Latheefa Beebi Koya	436
Saiful Izham Ramli	430
Osman Abd Rahman	428
Badrul Hisham Shaharin	419
Ansari Abdullah	412
Animah Ferrar	410
Khalid Jaafar	394
Zakaria Abdul Hamid	377
Cheah Kah Peng	349
Suzana Manja Ibrahim	325
Zahir Hassan	317
Ahmad Zaki Yamani	316
Dzulkifli Ismail	312
Zainon Jaafar	303
Zulkifli Ibrahim	274
Lee Kim Sin	271
Nik Hasan Nik Ya	269
Tai Seng Ng	261
Kalaivanar Balasundram	256
Edwin Bosi	240
Norizam Yasin	239
Manikavasagam Sundaram	236
Lee Sang	235
Evelyn Gabriel	233
Ayyathurai Achutharaman	228
Nor Azman Mat Amin	225
Chai Tong Chai	195
Abdul Razak Ahmad	192
Low Chee Cheong	192
Salma Ismail	185
Azmi Khamis	163
Mohd Yatim Ismail	161
Abd Rahim Abd Wahab	160
Razali Alias	155
Daniel John Jambun	155
Nordin Ismail	145
Fariz Musa	132
Ahmad Nizam Hamid	129
Yahya Ismail	127
Lim Ong Hang	117
Abd Wahab Ibrahim	115
Hassan Malempeng	113
Jalumin Samin	103
Idris Bohari	101
Johari Kassim	99
Ismaily Bongsu	96
Jenapala Perumal	94
Francis Sebastian	93
Lim Yoon Pang	93
Safian M. Shah	84
K. S. Kottapan	84
Abd Malik Kassim	76
Mustaffa Kamil Ayub	Withdrew
Invalid	22

=== Central Women’s Leadership Council (MPWP) ===
==== Women's Chief ====
Candidate	Delegates' votes
Zuraida Kamaruddin	Unopposed

==== Deputy Women's Chief ====
Candidate	Delegates' votes
Rodziah Ismail	206
Elizabeth Wong Keat Ping	62

==== Vice Women's Chiefs ====
Candidate	Delegates' votes
Zaliha Mustafa	216
Haniza Talha	206
Noor Sham Abu Samah	166

=== Central Youth Leadership Council (MPAMKP) ===
==== Youth Chief ====
Candidate	Delegates' votes
Shamsul Iskandar Mohd Akin	243
Hasmi Hashim	51

==== Deputy Youth Chief ====
Candidate	Delegates' votes
Fariz Musa	200
Zamakh Sari Ibrahim	117

==== Vice Youth Chiefs ====
Candidate	Delegates' votes
Khairul Anuar Ahmad Zainudin	218
Amirudin Shari	180
Tan Seng Toh	154
Ahmad Zaki Yamani Zainon	Lost (Note: Candidates sorted alphabetically)
Johson Chong	Lost
Zukri Aksah	Lost
