= 2001 National Justice Party leadership election =

Leadership election of the KeADILan, a reformist Malaysian political party

- 9–11 November 2001
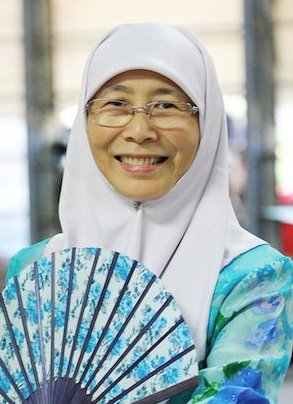
Candidate	Wan Azizah Wan Ismail
Popular vote	Unopposed
President before election
Wan Azizah Wan Ismail
Elected President
Wan Azizah Wan Ismail

A leadership election was held by the National Justice Party (KeADILan) on 10 November 2001. It was won by the incumbent president, Wan Azizah Wan Ismail.

== Nominations and results ==
=== Central Leadership Council ===
==== Permanent Chairman ====
Candidate	Delegates' votes
Abdul Rahman Abdul Kadir	Unopposed

==== Deputy Permanent Chairman ====
Candidate	Delegates' votes
Mahyuddin Shaari	Unopposed

==== President ====
Candidate	Delegates' votes
Wan Azizah Wan Ismail	Unopposed

==== Deputy President ====
Candidate	Delegates' votes
Abdul Rahman Othman	521
Muhammad Nur Manuty	477
Chandra Muzaffar	Withdrew
Mohamad Ezam Mohd Nor	Withdrew
Mohamed Azmin Ali	Withdrew
Saifuddin Nasution Ismail	Withdrew

==== Vice Presidents ====
Candidate	Delegates' votes (max. 3)
Mohamed Azmin Ali	578
Chua Tian Chang	562
Sheikh Azmi Ahmad	529
Ruslan Kasim	527
Anuar Tahir	380
Gobalakrishnan Nagapan	378
Zainur Zakaria	Withdrew
Saari Sungib	Withdrew
Xavier Jayakumar	Withdrew
Khalil Shah Jamaluddin	Withdrew
Muhammad Nur Manuty	Withdrew
Abd Rahman Yusof	Withdrew
Mohamad Ezam Mohd Nor	Withdrew
Abdul Wahid Ahmad Shuhaime	Withdrew
Saifuddin Nasution Ismail	Withdrew
Abdul Rahman Othman	Withdrew

==== Central Leadership Council ====
Candidate	Delegates' votes (max. 20)
Mohd Jafri Ab Rashid	636
Badrulamin Bahron	611
Abd Rahman Yusof	584
Lee Boon Chye	556
Xavier Jayakumar	552
Mansor Othman	506
Saupi Daud	493
Ng Lum Yong	489
Sahri Bahari	488
Mohd Nor Nawawi	476
Kamarul Baharin Abbas	470
Muhamad Mustafa	441
Johari Abdul	436
Usaili Alias	426
Cheah Kah Peng	397
Zuraida Kamaruddin	382
Rosli Ibrahim	376
Lokman Noor Adam	369
Hamzah Awang	361
Mohd Yahya Mat Sahri	360

=== Central Women’s Leadership Council ===
==== Women's Chief ====
Candidate	Delegates' votes
Fuziah Salleh	Won
Zainon Jaafar	Lost
Hafsah Harun	Lost

==== Deputy Women's Chief ====
Candidate	Delegates' votes
Irene Fernandez	Won
Animah Ferrar	Lost

=== Central Youth Leadership Council ===
==== Youth Chief ====
Candidate	Delegates' votes
Mohamad Ezam Mohd Nor	Unopposed
Saifuddin Nasution Ismail	Withdrew
Mustaffa Kamil Ayub	Withdrew

==== Deputy Youth Chief ====
Candidate	Delegates' votes
Saifuddin Nasution Ismail	216
Mustaffa Kamil Ayub	138
Shamsul Iskandar Mohd Akin	Withdrew
Adlan Benan Omar	Withdrew
Invalid	1

==== Vice Youth Chiefs ====
Candidate	Delegates' votes
Low Chee Chong	248
Muhammad Zahid Arip	213
Shamsul Iskandar Mohd Akin	172
Adlan Benan Omar	Lost
Johari Kassim	Lost
Zulrusdi Mohamad Hol	Lost
Mohammad Sahar Mat Din	Lost
Jaafar Muhammad	Lost
Vijayan	Lost
Yusri Mohamad	Lost
Hamidzun Khairuddin	Lost
Mustaffa Kamil Ayub	Withdrew
Saifuddin Nasution Ismail	Withdrew
Hamdan Taha	Withdrew
