= Chua Wei Kiat =

Malaysian politician

Yang Berhormat Tuan Chua Wei Kiat MLA
- 蔡伟杰

Member of the Selangor State Legislative Assembly for Rawang
- Incumbent
- Assumed office 9 May 2018
- Preceded by: Gan Pei Nei (PR–PKR)
- Majority: 23,860 (2018); 25,658 (2023)

Personal details
- Born: Chua Wei Kiat; 23 March 1989 (age 37) Kuala Lumpur, Malaysia
- Party: People's Justice Party (PKR) (2008-Present)
- Other political affiliations: Pakatan Harapan (PH) (2015-Present): Pakatan Rakyat (PR) (2008-2015)
- Education: Sekolah Menengah Jenis Kebangsaan Chong Hwa, Gombak; University of Abertay Dundee (Bachelor of Business and Marketing); University of Malaya (Master of Public Administration)
- Occupation: Politician

Chua Wei Kiat (born 23 March 1989) is a Malaysian politician who has served as member of the Selangor State Legislative Assembly (MLA) for Rawang since May 2018. He is a member of the People's Justice Party (PKR), a component party of Pakatan Harapan (PH) coalition.

== Early life and education ==
Born in Kuala Lumpur, Chua completed his primary education at SJKC Chiao Nan in Setapak and secondary education at SMJK Chong Hwa in Gombak. He pursued higher education earning a Diploma in Business Administration from SEGi College and Bachelor of Business and Marketing degree from University of Abertay Dundee in Scotland.

== Political career ==
Chua joined People's Justice Party (PKR) in year 2008, his political journey began with his active involvement in PKR’s youth wing, Angkatan Muda Keadilan (AMK). In July 2021, he was appointed as the Selangor AMK Chief, succeeding Najwan Halimi. His leadership in the youth wing was marked by efforts to engage younger voters and address issues pertinent to the youth demographic.

In the 2018 Selangor state election, Chua contested the Rawang state seat and won with a significant majority, securing 29,946 votes (76.91%) against his closest competitor from the Malaysian Chinese Association (MCA), who garnered 6,086 votes (15.63%). He successfully retained his seat in the 2023 state election, increasing his majority to 25,658 votes.

=== Party roles and contributions ===
Within PKR, Chua has held several key positions. He is previously served as the deputy information chief of the party, where he was involved in strategic communications and public engagement. His tenure in this role included addressing party positions on various national issues and countering opposition narratives.

Chua has been an advocate for youth participation in politics, emphasizing the importance of engaging young voters and addressing their concerns. He has highlighted PKR’s experience and commitment to youth issues, positioning the party as a viable platform for young Malaysians seeking political involvement.

=== Legislative Initiatives ===
As the Rawang assemblyman, Chua has focused on local development projects, infrastructure improvements, and community welfare programs. He has been proactive in addressing constituents’ concerns and facilitating dialogue between the state government and local communities. His efforts include advocating for better public amenities, educational opportunities, and economic development within his constituency.

== Involvement with think tank ==
Beyond his legislative duties, Chua serves as the executive director of the Centre of Regional Strategic Studies (CROSS), an independent think tank in Malaysia. CROSS conducts research and provides advisory services on organizational and regional strategic issues. In this capacity, Chua collaborates with other leaders to promote policy research and strategic studies aimed at addressing regional challenges and fostering sustainable development.

== Election results ==
Selangor State Legislative Assembly
Year	Constituency	Candidate	Votes	Pct	Opponent(s)	Votes	Pct	Ballots cast	Majority	Turnout
2018	N14 Rawang	Chua Wei Kiat (PKR)	29,946	76.91%	Chan Wun Hoong (MCA)	6,086	15.63%	38,935	23,860	85.60%
2018	N14 Rawang	Chua Wei Kiat (PKR)	29,946	76.91%	Kong Tuck Wah (PAS)	2,259	5.80%	38,935	23,860	85.60%
2018	N14 Rawang	Chua Wei Kiat (PKR)	29,946	76.91%	Azman Mohd Noor (IND)	644	1.66%	38,935	23,860	85.60%
2023	N14 Rawang	Chua Wei Kiat (PKR)	39,168	74.35%	Rejean Kumar Ratnam (BERSATU)	13,510	25.65%	53,097	25,658	69.10%
