= Rawang (state constituency) =

Selangor state constituency in Malaysia

Rawang (N14)
Selangor constituency

State constituency
- Legislature: Selangor State Legislative Assembly
MLA
Chua Wei Kiat
PH
- Constituency created: 1974
- First contested: 1974
- Last contested: 2023

Demographics
- Electors (2023): 76,841

Rawang is a state constituency in Selangor, Malaysia, that has been represented in the Selangor State Legislative Assembly since 1974. It has been represented by Chua Wei Kiat of Pakatan Harapan (PH) since 2018.

The state constituency was created in the 1974 redistribution and is mandated to return a single member to the Selangor State Legislative Assembly under the first past the post voting system.

== Demographics ==
Ethnic breakdown of Rawang's electorate as of 2023
1. Chinese (38.7%)
2. Malay (31.8%)
3. Indian (25.7%)
4. Other ethnicities (3.80%)

== History ==
=== Polling districts ===
According to the federal gazette issued on 30 March 2018, the Rawang constituency is divided into 18 polling districts.

State constituency	Polling Districts	Code	Location
Rawang (N14）	Bandar Country Home 1	097/14/01	SK Taman Desa Bandar Country Homes
Rawang (N14）	Kuala Garing	097/14/02	SJK (T) Rawang
Rawang (N14）	Kampung Rajah	097/14/03	SMK Seri Garing Rawang
Rawang (N14）	Rawang	097/14/04	SK Rawang
Rawang (N14）	Kampung Melayu	097/14/05	Pejabat/Bilik Gerakan JKKK Kampung Lim Tan
Rawang (N14）	Kampung Kenanga	097/14/06	SRA Ibnu Khaldun Rawang
Rawang (N14）	Kampung Baharu Rawang	097/14/07	SJK (C) San Yuk Rawang
Rawang (N14）	Taman Sri Hijau	097/14/08	Rukun Tetangga Rawang 'A'
Rawang (N14）	Kanching	097/14/09	SMA Rawang
Rawang (N14）	Taman Bersatu	097/14/10	Dewan Seberguna Batu 17 Rawang
Rawang (N14）	Taman Bukit Rawang	097/14/11	SK Bukit Rawang Jaya
Rawang (N14）	Kampung Tanjung	097/14/12	Pejabat/Bilik Gerakan JKKK Kampung Tanjung
Rawang (N14）	Bandar Country Home 2	097/14/13	SMK Taman Desa Bandar Country Homes
Rawang (N14）	Kota Emerland East & West	097/14/14	SK Taman Desa (2)
Rawang (N14）	Garing Jaya	097/14/15	SK Sinaran Budi
Rawang (N14）	Batu Arang Barat	097/14/16	SK Batu Arang
Rawang (N14）	Batu Arang Timur	097/14/17	SJK (C) Chap Kuan
Rawang (N14）	Batu Arang Selatan	097/14/18	SMK Tuaku Abdul Rahman

=== Representation history ===
Members of the Legislative Assembly for Rawang
Assembly	No	Years	Member	Party
Constituency created from Kuang and Serendah
4th	N13	1974-1978	Lee Kim Sai (李金獅)	BN (MCA)
5th	N13	1978-1982	Lee Kim Sai (李金獅)	BN (MCA)
6th	N13	1982-1986	Tang See Hang (鄧詩漢)	BN (MCA)
7th	N16	1986-1990	Tang See Hang (鄧詩漢)	BN (MCA)
8th	N16	1990-1995	Tang See Hang (鄧詩漢)	BN (MCA)
9th	N13	1995-1999	Tang See Hang (鄧詩漢)	BN (MCA)
10th	N13	1999-2004	Tang See Hang (鄧詩漢)	BN (MCA)
11th	N14	2004-2008	Tang See Hang (鄧詩漢)	BN (MCA)
12th	N14	2008-2013	Gan Pei Nei (顔貝倪)	PR (PKR)
13th	N14	2013-2015	Gan Pei Nei (顔貝倪)	PR (PKR)
13th	N14	2015-2018	Gan Pei Nei (顔貝倪)	PH (PKR)
14th	N14	2018–2023	Chua Wei Kiat (蔡偉杰)	PH (PKR)
15th	N14	2023–present	Chua Wei Kiat (蔡偉杰)	PH (PKR)

== Election results ==
Selangor state election, 2023
Party	Candidate	Votes	%	∆%
PH	Chua Wei Kiat	39,168	74.35	▼2.56
PN	Rejean Kumar Ratnam	13,510	25.65	▲25.65
Total valid votes		52,678	100.00	
Total rejected ballots		357		
Unreturned ballots		62		
Turnout		53,097	69.10	▼16.50
Registered electors		76,841		
Majority		25,658	48.73	▼12.55
PH hold		Swing		

Selangor state election, 2018
Party	Candidate	Votes	%	∆%
PKR	Chua Wei Kiat	29,946	76.91	▲10.09
BN	Chan Wun Hoong	6,086	15.63	▼17.55
PAS	Kong Tuck Wah	2,259	5.80	▲5.80
Independent	Azman Mohd Noor	644	1.66	▲1.66
Total valid votes		38,935	100.00	
Total rejected ballots		366		
Unreturned ballots		180		
Turnout		39,481	85.60	▼1.10
Registered electors		46,125		
Majority		23,860	61.28	▲27.64
PKR hold		Swing		

Selangor state election, 2013
Party	Candidate	Votes	%	∆%
PKR	Gan Pei Nei	18,358	66.82	▲6.82
BN	Lee Li Yew	9,117	33.18	▼2.79
Total valid votes		27,475	100.00	
Total rejected ballots		394		
Unreturned ballots		54		
Turnout		27,923	86.70	▲10.59
Registered electors		32,208		
Majority		9,241	33.64	▲9.61
PKR hold		Swing		
Source(s) "Federal Government Gazette - Notice of Contested Election, State Legislative Assembly for the State of Selangor [P.U. (B) 192/2013]" (PDF). Attorney General's Chambers of Malaysia. 26 April 2013. Archived from the original (PDF) on 2019-12-29. "Federal Government Gazette - Results of Contested Election and Statements of the Poll after the Official Addition of Votes, State Constituencies for the State of Selangor [P.U. (B) 233/2013]". Attorney General's Chambers of Malaysia. 22 May 2013. Archived from the original (PDF) on 2018-10-02.

Selangor state election, 2008
Party	Candidate	Votes	%	∆%
PKR	Gan Pei Nei	10,467	60.00	▲60.00
BN	Goh Ah Ling	6,275	35.97	▼41.92
Independent	Chandrasegaran Arumugam	704	4.03	▲4.03
Total valid votes		17,446	100.00	
Total rejected ballots		288		
Unreturned ballots		34		
Turnout		17,768	76.11	▲7.81
Registered electors		23,345		
Majority		4,192	24.03	▼31.75
PKR gain from BN		Swing		?

Selangor state election, 2004
Party	Candidate	Votes	%	∆%
BN	Tang See Hang	10,534	77.89	▲15.67
Independent	Md Sabri Md Taib	2,990	22.11	▲22.11
Total valid votes		13,524	100.00	
Total rejected ballots		382		
Unreturned ballots		23		
Turnout		13,929	68.30	▼3.80
Registered electors		20,393		
Majority		7,544	55.78	▲30.73
BN hold		Swing		

Selangor state election, 1999
Party	Candidate	Votes	%	∆%
BN	Tang See Hang	11,518	62.22	▲62.22
DAP	Lim Ching How	6,880	37.17	▲37.17
Independent	Surder Singh	114	0.62	▲0.62
Total valid votes		18,512	100.00	
Total rejected ballots		493		
Unreturned ballots		112		
Turnout		19,117	72.10	▲72.10
Registered electors		26,513		
Majority		4,638	25.05	▲25.05
BN hold		Swing		

Selangor state election, 1995
Party	Candidate	Votes	%	∆%
On the nomination day, Tang See Hang won uncontested.
BN	Tang See Hang			
Total valid votes			100.00	
Total rejected ballots				
Unreturned ballots				
Turnout				
Registered electors				
Majority				
BN hold		Swing		

Selangor state election, 1990
Party	Candidate	Votes	%	∆%
BN	Tang See Hang	11,998	65.42	▲2.59
DAP	Low Sek Moah	6,341	34.58	▲3.53
Total valid votes		18,339	100.00	
Total rejected ballots		793		
Unreturned ballots		55		
Turnout		19,187	74.22	▲1.73
Registered electors		25,853		
Majority		5,997	32.70	▲0.92
BN hold		Swing		

Selangor state election, 1986
Party	Candidate	Votes	%	∆%
BN	Tang See Hang	9,446	62.83	▲3.06
DAP	Tai Sing Ng	4,668	31.05	▼4.18
PAS	Hasbolah Mohd Arif	921	6.12	▲1.12
Total valid votes		15,035	100.00	
Total rejected ballots		635		
Unreturned ballots		0		
Turnout		15,670	72.49	▼1.82
Registered electors		21,617		
Majority		4,778	31.78	▲7.24
BN hold		Swing		

Selangor state election, 1982
Party	Candidate	Votes	%	∆%
BN	Tang See Hang	8,185	59.77	▲1.03
DAP	Eng Seng Chai @ Ng Sing Sai	4,825	35.23	▲3.16
PAS	Abdul Rahman Yadi	685	5.00	▼1.00
Total valid votes		13,695	100.00	
Total rejected ballots		379		
Unreturned ballots		0		
Turnout		14,074	74.30	▼1.34
Registered electors		18,941		
Majority		3,360	24.53	▼4.20
BN hold		Swing		

Selangor state election, 1978
Party	Candidate	Votes	%	∆%
BN	Lee Kim Sai	6,763	60.80	▲12.08
DAP	Khoo Chin Tow	3,567	32.07	▼1.44
PAS	Hussein Ibrahim	667	6.00	▲6.00
PEKEMAS	Zainuddin Karim	127	1.14	▼10.01
Total valid votes		11,124	100.00	
Total rejected ballots		443		
Unreturned ballots		0		
Turnout		11,567	75.65	▲1.41
Registered electors		15,291		
Majority		3,196	28.73	▲10.64
BN hold		Swing		

Selangor state election, 1974
Party	Candidate	Votes	%
BN	Lee Kim Sai	3,701	48.72
DAP	Tan Heng Swee	2,327	30.63
PEKEMAS	J. P. Samuel Raj	847	11.15
Independent	Chou Yew Koh	722	9.50
Total valid votes		7,597	100.00
Total rejected ballots		469	
Unreturned ballots		0	
Turnout		8,066	74.24
Registered electors		10,865	
Majority		1,374	18.09
This was a new constituency created.
