= 2004 People's Justice Party leadership election =

2004 People's Justice Party presidential election
- 18 December 2004
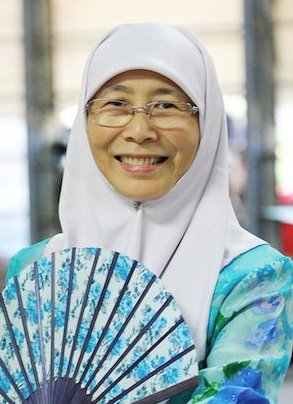
Candidate	Wan Azizah Wan Ismail
Popular vote	Unopposed
President before election
Wan Azizah Wan Ismail
Elected President
Wan Azizah Wan Ismail

A leadership election was held by the People's Justice Party (PKR) in Malaysia on 18 December 2004 to elect new leadership at the central level.

== Nominations and results ==
=== Central Leadership Council (MPP) ===
==== President ====
Candidate	Delegates' votes
Wan Azizah Wan Ismail	Unopposed

==== Deputy President ====
Candidate	Delegates' votes
Syed Husin Ali	794
Abdul Rahman Othman	261

==== Vice Presidents ====
Candidate	Delegates' votes
Mohamed Azmin Ali	Won
Lee Boon Chye	Won
Sivarasa Rasiah	Won
Abd Rahman Yusof	Lost (Note: Candidates sorted alphabetically)
Gobalakrishnan Nagapan	Lost
Sheikh Azmi Ahmad	Lost

=== Central Women’s Leadership Council (MPWP) ===
==== Women's Chief ====
Candidate	Delegates' votes
Fuziah Salleh	141
Animah Ferrar	78

==== Deputy Women's Chief ====
Candidate	Delegates' votes
Zainon Jaafar	Unopposed
Irene Fernandez	Withdrew
Zuraida Kamaruddin	Withdrew

==== Vice Women's Chiefs ====
Candidate	Delegates' votes
Rohani Bakar	Unopposed
Rodziah Ismail	Unopposed
Zuraida Kamaruddin	Unopposed
Maznah Abdul Aziz	Withdrew

=== Central Youth Leadership Council (MPAMKP) ===
==== Youth Chief ====
Candidate	Delegates' votes
Mohamad Ezam Mohd Nor	Unopposed

==== Deputy Youth Chief ====
Candidate	Delegates' votes
Faizal Sanusi	Unopposed

==== Vice Youth Chiefs ====
Candidate	Delegates' votes
Shamsul Iskandar Mohd Akin	Unopposed
Manikavasagam Sundaram	Unopposed
Sharifah Shahidah	Unopposed
