= Gan Pei Nei =

Malaysian politician

- 颜贝倪

Member of the Selangor State Legislative Assembly for Rawang
- In office 8 March 2008 – 9 May 2018
- Preceded by: Tang See Hang (BN–MCA)
- Succeeded by: Chua Wei Kiat (PH–PKR)
- Majority: 4,192 (2008); 9,241 (2013)

Personal details
- Born: 1981 (age 44–45) Pulau Gadong, Malacca, Malaysia
- Party: People's Justice Party (PKR)
- Other political affiliations: Pakatan Rakyat (PR) (2008–2015); Pakatan Harapan (PH) (2015–present)
- Occupation: Politician
- Website: ganpeinei.wordpress.com

Gan Pei Nei is a Malaysian politician who served as member of the Selangor State Legislative Assembly (MLA) for Rawang from March 2008 to May 2018. She is a member of People's Justice Party (PKR), a component party of Pakatan Harapan (PH) and formerly Pakatan Rakyat (PR) coalitions.

== Political career ==
She first enter the political in March 2004 when she and other help Tian Chua campaign in Batu seat.

Gan Pei Nei later elected as Rawang assemblywomen in 2008 with majority of 4,192 votes. She was reelected in 2013 with majority of 9,241 votes. However, she might dropped in 2018 as she alleged of embezzlement funds and her name was dropped.

== Election results ==
Selangor State Legislative Assembly
Year	Constituency	Candidate	Votes	Pct	Opponent(s)	Votes	Pct	Ballots cast	Majority	Turnout
2008	N14 Rawang	Gan Pei Nei (PKR)	10,467	60.00%	Goh Ah Ling (MCA)	6,275	35.97%	17,768	4,192	76.11%
2008	N14 Rawang	Gan Pei Nei (PKR)	10,467	60.00%	Chandrasegaran Arumugam (IND)	704	4.03%	17,768	4,192	76.11%
2013	N14 Rawang	Gan Pei Nei (PKR)	18,358	66.82%	Lee Li Yew (MCA)	9,117	33.18%	27,923	9,241	86.70%
