= 2021 Malaysian state elections =

2021 Malaysian state election
- 20 November 2021 (Malacca); 18 December 2021 (Sarawak)

2 out of 13 state legislative (DUN)
- Results of the elections: Barisan Nasional Gain; Gabungan Parti Sarawak Hold; No election/Federal Territories

State elections in 2021 are held in Malacca and Sarawak. States in Malaysia are allow to dissolve separately from the federal level. In Malacca, the state legislature was dissolved on 5 October 2021 after four ADUN withdrew support of the current state government at that time. The election took place on 20 November 2021 which resulted in Barisan Nasional to win by a landslide and taking back the state from Pakatan Harapan (who won them in 2018).

Meanwhile in Sarawak, the assembly had automatically dissolved on 7 Jun 2021 but it was suspended as an emergency was declared. However on 3 November 2021, the state legislature was dissolved as the Agong lifted the emergency. On 24 November 2021, the Election Commission announced that the election would take place on 18 December 2021.

== Malacca ==
The election was held on 20 November 2021 where Barisan Nasional won 2/3 majority in the state legisture.

== Sarawak ==
The election was held on 18 December 2021.
