= Mohamad Ezam Mohd Nor =

Malaysian politician and activist

Yang Berbahagia Datuk Mohamad Ezam Mohd Nor PJN
- محمد عظم محمد نور

Senator Appointed by the Yang di-Pertuan Agong
- In office 26 August 2013 – 5 March 2014
- Preceded by: Himself
- Succeeded by: Abdul Rahim Abdul Rahman
- In office 3 May 2010 – 2 May 2013
- Preceded by: Wong Foon Meng
- Succeeded by: Himself

Communications Director of the Ministry of Finance
- In office 15 March 2014 – 2016
- Minister: Najib Razak

Political Secretary to the Deputy Prime Minister and Minister of Finance
- In office 1996 – 2 September 1998
- Deputy Prime Minister and Minister: Anwar Ibrahim

Deputy President of the Parti Rakyat Malaysia
- In office December 2022 – September 2024
- President: Ahmad Jufliz Faiza
- Preceded by: Tan Chow Kang
- Succeeded by: TBD

1st Youth Chief of the People's Justice Party (Note: National KeADILan Youth from 1999 until 2003 and PKR Youth from 2003 until 2006.)
- In office 4 April 1999 – 30 October 2006
- Deputy Youth Chief: Mustaffa Kamil Ayub (1999–2004); Faizal Sanusi (2004–2006)
- Preceded by: Position created
- Succeeded by: Shamsul Iskandar Mohd Akin

Personal details
- Born: Mohamad Ezam bin Mohd Nor; 24 April 1967 (age 59) Klang, Selangor, Malaysia
- Party: Malaysian Islamic Party (PAS) (2024–present); Parti Rakyat Malaysia (PRM) (2022–2024); Pan-Malaysian Islamic Front (BERJASA) (2022); People's Justice Party (PKR) (2003–2007, 2020); Malaysian United Indigenous Party (BERSATU) (2016); United Malay National Organization (UMNO) (1993–1999, 2008–2016); National Justice Party (KeADILan) (1999–2003)
- Other political affiliations: Perikatan Nasional (PN) (2024–present); Gerakan Tanah Air (GTA) (2022); Pakatan Harapan (PH) (2016, 2020); Barisan Nasional (BN) (1993–1998, 2008–2016); Barisan Alternatif (BA) (1999–2004)
- Spouse: Bahirah Tajul Aris
- Children: 3
- Education: Victoria Institution
- Alma mater: International Islamic University Malaysia (BEc)
- Occupation: Politician, activist

Mohamad Ezam bin Mohd Nor (Jawi: محمد عظم بن محمد نور; born 24 April 1967) is a Malaysian politician and activist who was one of the founding members of the People's Justice Party (PKR). He served as a member of the Dewan Negara twice, from May 2010 to May 2013 and from August 2013 until he resigned in March 2014. He also served as the communications director of the Ministry of Finance from March 2014 until 2016 and political secretary for Deputy Prime Minister and Finance Minister Anwar Ibrahim from 1996 until September 1998. He is best known for his role in opposing corruption within the Malaysian government and his prominent activism during the Reformasi movement in the late 1990s, with prominent figures like Lokman Noor Adam. Mohamad Ezam has been a figure of political controversy in Malaysia, having switched political parties several times, and is widely known for his vocal criticism of political corruption and abuses of power.

Mohamad Ezam first became known when he was involved in the Reformasi movement in 1998 and became the first Youth Leader of the National Justice Party (KeADILan) in 1999. He was the deputy president of the Malaysian People's Party (PRM) from December 2022 until September 2024, before joining the Malaysian Islamic Party (PAS). He is also active in mobilizing non-governmental organizations that focus on anti-corruption, such as the People's Anti-Corruption Movement (GERAK) and Hisbah Center for Reform (HISBAH).

== Early life and education ==
Mohamad Ezam bin Mohd Nor was born in Klang, Selangor, Malaysia on 24 April 1967. He went to Victoria Institution, Kuala Lumpur for his secondary education from 1980 until 1984. He continued his studies at International Islamic University Malaysia (UIAM) in 1987 and received his bachelor's degree in economics (BEc) in 1991.

== Early political career (1993–1998) ==
Mohamad Ezam started his political career by joining the United Malays National Organisation (UMNO) in 1993. He served as the head of the UMNO Youth of Petaling Jaya Selatan division from 1993 until 1996. Then, he was promoted to become the secretary of UMNO Selangor from 1996 until 1998 and demoted back to the vice head of UMNO of Petaling Jaya Selatan division. He also served briefly as the political secretary for his mentor, Anwar Ibrahim while Anwar still became the deputy prime minister and finance minister from 1996 until September 1998, before Anwar was sacked by Mahathir Mohamad due to the sodomy trial.

== Reformasi and KeADILan founding member (1999–2007) ==
Mohamad Ezam's political journey began in the late 1990s during the Reformasi movement, a series of mass protests and rallies triggered by the dismissal of Deputy Prime Minister Anwar Ibrahim in 1998. Mohamad Ezam, then a student, became deeply involved in the movement, which aimed to reform the Malaysian political system, fight corruption, and restore justice. He was a vocal supporter of Anwar Ibrahim and was one of the key figures within the Malaysian Islamic Youth Movement (ABIM), a youth organization linked to Anwar.

Mohamad Ezam contested in the 1999 general election for the Shah Alam seat. It was a two-corner fight between himself and UMNO candidate Mohd Zin Mohamed. However, he was lost with a slim majority, which was 1,440 votes.

During the Reformasi era, Mohamad Ezam's activism drew the attention of the Malaysian authorities. In 2001, Mohamad Ezam was arrested under the Internal Security Act (ISA), a controversial law that allows detention without trial, due to his involvement in the political protests and his outspoken criticism of Prime Minister Mahathir Mohamad's government. He was detained for a total of 18 months, and his imprisonment marked a significant period of his life that solidified his commitment to fighting for democratic reforms in Malaysia.

Since Anwar's arrest in 1998, until his release in 2004, Mohamad Ezam never stopped giving speeches and campaigning for his release. Mohamad Ezam attended several cases involving court cases. In the case of Mohamad Ezam Mohd Noor v Inspector General of Police & Others [2002]4 CLJ 309, the Federal Court ruled that the position of Article 5(3) of the Federal Constitution is unchanged based on Section 4(4) of the Human Rights Commission Act (SUHAKAM Act) 1999, and there is no urgent need to apply international rules/laws. Further, in the case of Mohamad Ezam Mohd Nor v PP [Criminal Appeal No: 42-22-2002], the Shah Alam High Court has decided that there are two categories of official secrets, which are 'scheduled official secrets' and 'Leveled official secrets' that first need to be classified by the Minister, Menteri Besar and Chief Minister. In 2002, Mohamad Ezam was sentenced to two years in prison. As such, he was detained under the Internal Security Act (ISA) from 2002 to 2003; and the Official Secrets Act (OSA) in 2002, both simultaneously.

Mohamad Ezam also resigned as the Youth Chief of the People's Justice Party (PKR) on 30 October 2006 after serving as its first youth chief over 8 years on the statement given by him in a special press conference at PKR office in Brickfields.

== Return to UMNO and senatorship (2007–2016) ==
In June 2007, Mohamad Ezam announced that he would leave PKR. This shock announcement was made because he said that he no longer believed in Anwar's struggle and was said to be rivaled by Anwar's most right strongman, Mohamed Azmin Ali. Mohamad Ezam is said to be unable to cooperate with Mohamed Azmin because of different ways of thinking. He was labeled by Pakatan Rakyat supporters as a bribe-eater, traitor, political opportunist and various other titles. He later funded the Gerakan Rakyat Anti Korupsi (GERAK) and served as its first president from 2007 until 2008. In May 2008, he joined his old political party, the United Malays National Organisation (UMNO).

On 3 May 2010, Mohamad Ezam was sworn in as a senator in the Malaysian Parliament. Apart from him, the other three individuals appointed are former Deputy President of Malaysian Indian Congress (MIC), Palanivel Govindasamy, Executive Chairman of Rahim and Co, Abdul Rahim Abdul Rahman and Pagoh UMNO Women's Chief Division, Noriah Mahat. They took the oath in front of the President of the Dewan Negara, Abu Zahar Ujang. Mohamad Ezam said he was appointed as a senator because of the role he played in the non-governmental organization, Gerakan Rakyat Anti Korupsi (GERAK), where he also served as its president since 2007. In addition, he was appointed as the vice head of UMNO of Kota Raja division after won without contest on 21 September 2013.

However, after serving a full one term and a half as a senator, he tendered his resignation on 5 March 2014. After 10 days, he was appointed by Prime Minister and Finance Minister Najib Razak as the communications director of the Ministry of Finance. He held the position until 2016, when he resigned. He also left his political party, UMNO, in October 2016 after staying nearly 10 years, quoting that "considered that the party was no longer serious in the fight against corruption". He also added that "he joined UMNO in May 2008 to focus on the repeal of the Internal Security Act (ISA) and the Official Secrets Act (OSA). I have been jailed under these two acts, but what is more important is that I believe these two acts are often an obstacle to the fight against corruption crimes. During my tenure as a member of the Dewan Negara from 2010 to 2014, ISA was discussed and abolished, while OSA still shows no signs of change".

== Frequent party switching and GE-15 (2016–2023) ==
Mohamad Ezam joined the Malaysian United Indigenous Party (BERSATU) in October 2016, after leaving UMNO in the same month. However, after nearly three months, he left BERSATU in a statement with Malaysiakini.

In 2017, Mohamad Ezam joined Parti Generasi Baru (NewGen), a political party that was founded in 2013. He was elected as the president and selected Khairuddin Abu Hassan as his deputy. However, he changed NewGen Party into Parti Bebas Rasuah (PBS), taking almost 300 members from the old party, causing the anger of the previous leadership. This led to the previous president of NewGen, G. Kumar Aamaan, making a police report and a complaint to the Registry of Societies Malaysia (ROS) requesting further investigation because the action in question violated the party's constitution and the agency's laws. The PBR party won't last long since Mohamd Ezam decided not to wait for the ROS to approve his request after two months.

In the 2018 general election, Mohamad Ezam was expected to run for the Pekan seat, He will face his former boss, Najib Razak, who is the sole BN candidate. However, he canceled his intention to run for the Pekan seat but instead Shah Alam. This was announced by the Secretary-General of Hisbah Malaysia, Abdul Ghani Haroon. He added that "Shah Alam was chosen as it is an urban constituency with a large Malay majority." However, he withdrew his nomination.

Mohamad Ezam also considered running for the Port Dickson seat in the 2018 by-election. However, he withdrew his intention to face his former mentor, Anwar Ibrahim.

In May 2019, Mohamad Ezam decided to found a new political party, named "Parti Negara" (NEGARA). It focused on fighting the corruption, which is the main enemy of the country. He sent his application to the ROS on 17 May 2019. However, in January 2020, he decided not to pursue his application.

In June 2020, Mohamad Ezam confirmed that he rejoined PKR, his old political party and had already submitted his application form. He added that "the decision was made on the recommendation of friends and PKR leaders themselves to help the party". However, he left the party on the same year.

In May 2022, Mohamad Ezam joined the Pan-Malaysian Islamic Front (BERJASA). However, he left the party in the same year.

Mohamad Ezam was speculated to run for the Langkawi seat in the general election in 2022. He will be faced with his old archnemesis, Mahathir Mohamad, who is also expected to compete for the same seat in Kedah.

In November 2022, Mohamad Ezam joined the Malaysian People's Party (PRM). He was selected as the deputy president of PRM, succeeding Tan Chow Kang in December 2022. PRM allocated him to compete in one of the Selangor parliamentary seats, not in Langkawi.

Mohamad Ezam has been selected by PRM as a candidate to contest in the Petaling Jaya parliamentary seat in the general election in 2022. He lost in a six-cornered match with a majority of 50,575 votes. Pakatan Harapan (PH) candidate, Lee Chean Chung succeeded in gaining 83,311 votes, while Mohamad Ezam has collected only 2,049 votes.

== State election and PAS (2023–present) ==
In August 2023, Mohamad Ezam was once again nominated as the PRM candidate for the Selat Klang state assembly seat in the state election in 2023. However, he again lost the election to the PN–BERSATU candidate, Abdul Rashid Asari. This 3-sided match saw Abdul Rashid win a majority of 8,325 votes by gaining 25,143 votes, leaving Mohamad Ezam with only 742 votes. He left PRM in September 2024 and resigned his position as the deputy president.

In September 2024, Mohamad Ezam joined the Malaysian Islamic Party (PAS). The participation of Mohamad Ezam was announced by the Secretary-General of PAS, Takiyuddin Hassan, at the 70th PAS Summit at the Al-Makmur Kerdau Complex, Temerloh, Pahang.

== Controversies and issues ==
=== Voice similarity to Anwar Ibrahim ===
Mohamad Ezam's voice is often compared to that of Anwar Ibrahim, both known for their clear, resonant tones and strong, authoritative presence when speaking. They share a style of persuasive delivery, frequently quoting Quranic verses in their speeches. This resemblance has led to comparisons, particularly during public addresses, speeches or debates. Mohamad Ezam's articulation, intonation and emphasis on key points often mirror Anwar's style, which has been noted by both supporters and critics. Some believe this similarity helps Mohamad Ezam capture the audience's attention, much like Anwar did during his political career.

=== Allegation of six boxes of corruption-related evidence ===
On 27 May 2009, in the Hujah program on TV9, Mohamad Ezam denied that he had six boxes of corruption-related evidence when Anwar Ibrahim was imprisoned in the Sungai Buloh Prison. However, he defended his claim about the existence of six boxes of corruption-related evidence that were shown to him by Anwar himself before he was arrested. He also added that all the boxes are still in Anwar's possession.

=== "Political frog" moniker ===
Mohamad Ezam's political journey saw further shifts in party allegiance. He continued to be involved in Malaysian politics, though often amidst controversy. His frequent party switches led to accusations of opportunism and a lack of consistency in his political beliefs, with critics labeling him a "political frog". (Note: Mohamad Ezam’s repeated changes of political affiliation earned him the moniker of "frog" in the Malaysian political scene, a term used to describe politicians who defect from one party to another for personal gain or political convenience.) Nonetheless, he maintained a presence in Malaysian politics, at times serving in various political roles and continuing to advocate for anti-corruption measures.

Mohamad Ezam initially rose to prominence as a key figure in the Reformasi movement and was one of the founding members of the People's Justice Party (PKR), led by Anwar Ibrahim in 1999. However, in 2008, Mohamad Ezam controversially rejoined United Malays National Organisation (UMNO), the ruling party he had previously criticized for corruption and undemocratic practices. Mohamad Ezam's shift back to UMNO shocked many, especially his supporters within PKR, who saw it as a betrayal of the reformist ideals he had espoused. His decision was widely criticized by both the opposition and the public, with many accusing him of opportunism and self-interest. Despite his assurances that he was committed to reform from within UMNO, many saw his return as a move to further his own political career rather than an effort to challenge the system. His decision to leave UMNO again in 2016 to join the Malaysian United Indigenous Party (BERSATU), which was aligned with the opposition at the time, added to his controversial reputation. This frequent party-hopping has remained a central point of contention in discussions about his political career.

== Personal life ==
Mohamad Ezan was married to Bahirah binti Tajul Aris and have three children, Tihani Mohamad Ezam, Mohd Hasif Mohamad Ezam and Mohd Haris Mohamad Ezam.

== Election results ==
Parliament of Malaysia
Year	Constituency	Candidate	Votes	Pct	Opponent(s)	Votes	Pct	Ballot casts	Majority	Turnout
1999	P098 Shah Alam	Mohamad Ezam Mohd Nor (KeADILan)	34,411	48.98%	Mohd Zin Mohamed (UMNO)	35,851	51.02%	71,477	1,440	77.07%
2022	P105 Petaling Jaya	Mohamad Ezam Mohd Nor (PRM)	2,049	1.40%	Lee Chean Chung (PKR)	83,311	57.12%	148,021	50,575	74.74%
2022	P105 Petaling Jaya	Mohamad Ezam Mohd Nor (PRM)	2,049	1.40%	Theng Book (BERSATU)	32,736	22.44%	148,021	50,575	74.74%
2022	P105 Petaling Jaya	Mohamad Ezam Mohd Nor (PRM)	2,049	1.40%	Chew Hian Tat (MCA)	23,253	15.94%	148,021	50,575	74.74%
2022	P105 Petaling Jaya	Mohamad Ezam Mohd Nor (PRM)	2,049	1.40%	Mazween Mokhtar (PEJUANG)	4,052	2.78%	148,021	50,575	74.74%
2022	P105 Petaling Jaya	Mohamad Ezam Mohd Nor (PRM)	2,049	1.40%	KJ John (Independent)	461	0.32%	148,021	50,575	74.74%

Selangor State Legislative Assembly
Year	Constituency	Candidate	Votes	Pct	Opponent(s)	Votes	Pct	Ballots cast	Majority	Turnout
2023	N44 Selat Kelang	Mohamad Ezam Mohd Nor (PRM)	742	1.74%	Abdul Rashid Asari (BERSATU)	25,143	58.88%	42,703	8,325	74.12%
2023	N44 Selat Kelang	Mohamad Ezam Mohd Nor (PRM)	742	1.74%	Roslee Abd Hamid (UMNO)	16,818	39.38%	42,703	8,325	74.12%

== Honour ==
=== Honour of Malaysia ===
- Malaysia
  - Commander of the Order of Meritorious Service (PJN) – Datuk (2016)

== Bibliography ==
=== Books ===
- Di Sini Aku Berdiri (1999)
- Kilasan masa depan (2004)
- Freedom of information in Malaysia (2007) (Note: Co-Authored with Fahda Nur Ahmad Kamar.)
- Islam & Perjuangan Melawan Rasuah (2010) (Note: Co-Authored with Sapto Waluyo.)
- Islam dan Perbendaharaan: Kisah dan Teladan (2015)

== See also ==
- Reformasi (Malaysia)
- Frog (Malaysian politics)
