= Hasmi Hashim =

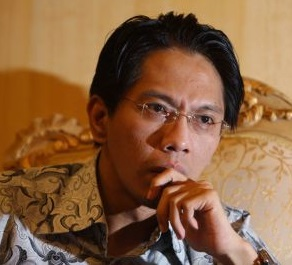

Background information
- Also known as: Buddhi Hékayat
- Born: 19 March 1976 (age 50); Johore
- Occupation: Politician / Writer / Lyricist / Poet
- Years active: 1998 - current

Hasmi Hashim (born 19 March 1976 in Batu Pahat, Johore), is a Malaysian politician, writer, lyricist, script-writer and poet.

== Awards ==
Hasmi received a variety of industry awards including:

- Creative Writing (Selangor Young Talent's Award 2010)
- Best Song - Awan Nano (Anugerah Juara Lagu 2011)
