= 50 dalil mengapa Anwar tidak boleh jadi PM =

Political book written by Khalid Jafri about Anwar Ibrahim

50 Arguments Why Anwar Shouldn't Be Prime Minister
- Author: Khalid Jafri Bakar Shah
- Original title: 50 dalil mengapa Anwar tidak boleh jadi PM
- Language: Malay
- Subject: Anwar Ibrahim
- Publisher: Media Pulau Lagenda
- Publication date: May 1998
- Publication place: Malaysia
- Pages: 359

50 dalil mengapa Anwar tidak boleh jadi PM or 50 Arguments Why Anwar Shouldn't Be Prime Minister is a book written by Khalid Jafri Bakar Shah. The book was first distributed at the 1998 United Malays National Organisation General Assembly, highlighting reasons why Anwar Ibrahim should not be the prime minister. Anwar, in high court, claimed officers from the Prime Minister's Office distributed the book in their official capacity at the World Trade Centre Kuala Lumpur. Prior to the distribution of the book, Anwar was the subject of allegations relating to homosexual activities, sodomy and abuse of power. He was later sacked by Tun Mahathir Mohamad from the cabinet and UMNO over allegations of sodomy.

== Content ==
The book lists 50 arguments on why Anwar Ibrahim should not be prime minister, the arguments range from him being authoritarian, gay and having a big appetite for revenge.

The book in paragraph 12, page 29 also alleged Anwar had an affair with Azmin Ali's wife, Azmin is his protege and personal assistant. Azmin also had a homosexuality case when a video allegedly featuring him in Sandakan, Sabah was leaked. But it was concluded that the video was authentic however facial recognition could not be done due to the quality of the video.

== Reception ==
While some arguments were proven to be true when Anwar was convicted of corruption charges in April 1999 and of sodomy charges on 8 August 2000, some of the arguments were also proven to be false, facilitating the conviction of Khalid Jafri to one year imprisonment for writing false information.
