= Tumpat =

Tumpat may refer to:

- Tumpat District, Kelantan, Malaysia
- Tumpat (federal constituency), represented in the Dewan Rakyat
- Tumpat FA, football team based in Kota Bharu, Kelantan
