= Marina Yusoff =

Malaysian politician (1941–2026)

Marina Yusoff (7 December 1941 – 11 March 2026) was a Malaysian politician, lawyer and businesswoman.

== Early life and career ==
Yusoff began her political career as an Umno activist. She was the deputy chief of Wanita Umno from 1972 to 1974. In 1987, along with Tan Sri Tengku Razaleigh Hamzah, she cofounded Parti Melayu Semangat 46 after an internal crisis in Umno.

When Semangat 46 merged back into Umno after the 1995 elections, Yusoff followed suit. However, she quit Umno again following the sacking of deputy prime minister Anwar Ibrahim. In 1999, she became the vice-president of Parti Keadilan Nasional.

In 1999, she ran in Wangsa Maju representing Keadilan but lost to Barisan Nasional candidate Zulhasnan Rafique. Yusoff retired from politics soon after.

In February 2001, she was fined RM5,000 by the Butterworth Sessions Court for making a "seditious" speech shortly before the 1999 general elections. In it, she blamed Umno for igniting the May 13th racial riots due to its unhappiness at the results of the general election.

She also clashed with fellow Keadilan leader Chandra Muzaffar and accused him of dividing the party and causing irreparable damage to the party during his tenure as deputy president. Yusoff said that she left the party after the 1999 general elections to Chandra and his "internal politicking".

In 2003, PKN merged with Parti Rakyat Malaysia to form Parti Keadilan Rakyat.

Yusoff was also the mother of popular actress Ida Nerina.

== Death ==
Yusoff died at a private hospital in Kuala Lumpur, on 11 March 2026, at the age of 84. The body was kept at Saidina Umar Al-Khattab Mosque, Bukit Damansara for prayers and later buried at Bukit Kiara Islamic Cemetery on 12 March.
