= Azmi Ahmad =

Malaysian Islamic scholar and politician

Dato' Sheikh Azmi Ahmad D.S.P.N.

Mufti of Penang
- In office 1992–1997
- Preceded by: Muhammad bin Hashim
- Succeeded by: Hassan Ahmad

Vice President of the National Justice Party
- In office April 1999 – August 2003 Serving with Marina Yusoff dan Tian Chua
- President: Wan Azizah Wan Ismail
- Preceded by: Position established
- Succeeded by: Position abolished

Vice President of the People's Justice Party
- In office 2003–2007 Serving with Tian Chua, Hafsah Harun, Lee Sang, Mohamed Azmin Ali, Sanusi Osman, dan Sivarasa Rasiah
- Preceded by: Position established
- Succeeded by: Mohamed Azmin Ali, Lee Boon Chye dan Mustaffa Kamil Ayub

Personal details
- Born: Azmi bin Ahmad; August 10, 1943 Batas Liku, Arau, Perlis,
- Died: March 1, 2008 (aged 64)
- Citizenship: Malaysia
- Party: National Justice Party (keADILan) (1999–2003); People's Justice Party (PKR) (2003–2008)
- Other political affiliations: Barisan Alternatif (BA) (1999–2004)
- Parent(s): Ahmad Long (father); Melor Musa (mother)

Azmi bin Ahmad (10 August 1943 – 1 March 2008), also known as Sheikh Azmi Ahmad, was a Malaysian Islamic scholar and politician. He served as the Mufti of Penang from 1993 to 1997. He also served as the Chief Sharia Judge for both Penang and the Federal Territories. Throughout his career, he was actively involved in both governmental and non-governmental organizations.

== Early life and education ==
Azmi was born on 10 August 1943 in Batas Liku, Arau, Perlis, and was the second child of Ahmad bin Long and Melor binti Musa. He received his early education at Sekolah Kebangsaan Arau and pursued his secondary education at Sekolah Arab Alawiyyah, Arau. He later travelled to Iraq for his tertiary studies, graduating from the University of Baghdad with a Bachelor of Arts in Sharia Studies and Arabic Literature. During his career, he studied law at the International Islamic University Malaysia (IIUM) in 1987, graduating with a Diploma in Judiciary and Administration of Islamic Law. In 1990, he attended a six-month course at the Muslim College in London.

== Career ==
After graduating from Iraq, Azmi began his career in Islamic religious services, including as an Islamic information officer for the Perak Islamic Religious Department. He was subsequently appointed as a qadi in Kedah, eventually rising to the position of Deputy Chief Qadi of the state. In 1990, he assumed the role of Chief Registrar of Marriage, Divorce, and Reconciliation in Alor Setar, a position he held until his retirement in 1991. Following his civil service career, he was appointed as the Mufti of Penang, serving from 1992 until 1997.

Alongside his institutional duties, Azmi contributed extensively to the development of Islamic finance in Malaysia. In 1994, he was appointed to the Islamic Instruments Research Group (KPII) under the Securities Commission Malaysia to deliberate and rule on matters concerning the Malaysian Islamic capital market. When the Securities Commission formally established its Sharia Advisory Council in 1996, Azmi was selected to serve as an inaugural council member, a role he maintained across two terms until 2000.

He returned to the judiciary to serve as the Chief Judge of the Penang Sharia Court from 1998 to 1999. Between February and April 1999, he briefly held office as the Chief Sharia Judge of the Federal Territories, overseeing Kuala Lumpur and Labuan, before transitioning into politics.

== Political career ==
Azmi was one of the founding members of the National Justice Party (KeADILan) and its successor, the People's Justice Party (PKR). He served as a vice-president of KeADILan throughout its existence from April 1999 until its merger with the Malaysian People's Party (PRM) in August 2003. Following the merger, he retained his position as vice-president until 2007. At the grassroots level, he co-founded the Kedah state chapter of the party alongside Johari Abdul, Ahmad Kassim, and several other figures.

== Election results ==
Parliament of Malaysia
| Year | Constituency | Candidate | Votes | Pct | Opponent(s) | Votes | Pct | Ballots cast | Majority | Turnout |
|---|---|---|---|---|---|---|---|---|---|---|
| 1999 | P018 Kulim-Bandar Baharu | Sheikh Azmi Ahmad (keADILan) | 12,697 | 37.95% | Abdul Kadir Sheikh Fadzir (UMNO) | 20,764 | 62.05% | 34,781 | 8,067 | 73.85% |

== Honours ==
- Penang
  - Darjah Setia Pangkuan Negeri (D.S.P.N.) - Dato' (1994)
