= National Justice Party (Malaysia) =

Reformist political party

National Justice Party Parti Keadilan Nasional
- Abbreviation: KeADILan
- Founder: Wan Azizah Wan Ismail
- Founded: 4 April 1999; 27 years ago
- Dissolved: 3 August 2003; 23 years ago
- Split from: United Malays National Organisation (UMNO)
- Preceded by: Pergerakan Keadilan Sosial (ADIL); Ikatan Masyarakat Islam Malaysia (IKATAN)
- Merged into: People's Justice Party (PKR)
- Headquarters: Petaling Jaya, Selangor
- Membership (2003): 218,950
- Ideology: Reformism; Progressivism; Social justice
- Political position: Centre
- National affiliation: Barisan Alternatif
- Colors: Light blue
- Slogan: Reformasi
- Anthem: Arus Perjuangan Bangsa

The National Justice Party (Malay: Parti Keadilan Nasional, KeADILan or PKN) was a reformist political party in Malaysia. Founded in 1999, it was the electoral vehicle of the Reformasi movement that followed the dismissal and arrest of Deputy Prime Minister Anwar Ibrahim in 1998. The party was established under the leadership of Wan Azizah Wan Ismail and drew support from activists and civil society groups demanding judicial independence, anti-corruption measures and political reform.

The party contested its first general election in 1999, entering national politics as a newly organised opposition force and winning parliamentary representation as part of the broader post-1998 opposition realignment. The party's founding and early mobilisation are widely credited with institutionalising Reformasi into parliamentary politics and providing a platform for multi-ethnic reformist campaigning.

After several years of negotiations with left-wing groups, the party merged with the socialist Malaysian People's Party (Parti Rakyat Malaysia, PRM) on 3 August 2003 to form the People's Justice Party (PKR), a broader national party that carried forward KeADILan's reformist agenda and became a major component of later opposition and governing coalitions.

== History ==
=== Background ===
The Malaysian economy was badly hit by the Asian financial crisis in 1997 when Finance Minister Anwar Ibrahim, concurrently serving as Deputy Prime Minister, implemented several economic reforms and austerity measures in response. He instituted an austerity package that cut government spending by 18%, cut ministerial salaries, and deferred major projects. This was despite it being a cornerstone of the government's development strategy, and the reforms were thus seen as challenging the administration's policies. The situation was exacerbated when he introduced controversial amendments to the Prevention of Corruption Act that sought to increase the powers of the Anti-Corruption Agency (ACA).

Prime Minister Mahathir Mohamad strongly disagreed with the measures, and towards the end of the 1990s, their relationship began to deteriorate, triggered by their conflicting views on governance. Eventually, Mahathir dismissed Anwar from his cabinet positions on 2 September 1998 before expelling him from UMNO the day after. This incident eventually led to Anwar's subsequent arrest and detention without trial on September 20 on what many believed to be politically motivated allegations of sexual misconduct and corruption. While he was in police custody, Anwar was beaten by the then Inspector-General of Police, Abdul Rahim Mohd Noor. The incident and the circumstances in which it occurred led to public outcry in what became known as the Reformasi movement.

=== Early years ===
During the autumn of 1998 and early 1999, as waves of street protests and civil society organising swept Malaysia, new civic groups coalesced around demands for judicial independence, an end to cronyism, and political reform. These developments created the preconditions for a new political vehicle to channel the Reformasi movement into electoral politics. At that time, two people's movements were established:

- The Pan-Malaysian Islamic Party (PAS), under the leadership of President Fadzil Noor, together with political parties such as the Democratic Action Party (DAP), the Malaysian People's Party (PRM), and Islamic NGOs such as the Malaysian Islamic Youth Movement (ABIM), established the Malaysian People's Justice Movement Council (Majlis Gerakan Keadilan Rakyat Malaysia, GERAK).
- Suara Rakyat Malaysia (SUARAM), in collaboration with political parties such as PAS, PRM, and DAP, along with other human rights organisations, also established a multiracial movement known as Gagasan Demokrasi Rakyat (GAGASAN).

The establishment of GERAK and GAGASAN was not solely to support the release of Anwar Ibrahim, but also draw attention to alleged injustices committed by the Malaysian government at the time, led by Prime Minister Mahathir Mohamad.

After Anwar's arrest, his wife, Wan Azizah Wan Ismail, decided to build upon the momentum of Reformasi by convening civil society actors and activists to form the Social Justice Movement (Pergerakan Keadilan Sosial, ADIL) on 10 December 1998. Initially planned to serve as a non-governmental organisation vehicle for the Reformasi movement, ADIL faced obstacles to formal party registration from the Registrar of Societies (RoS), which was under the jurisdiction of the Ministry of Home Affairs whose minister happened to be Mahathir Mohamad.

Due to difficulties in becoming a registered political party, Reformasi organisers instead made the decision to take over an existing minor party, the Malaysian Islamic Community Alliance (Ikatan Masyarakat Islam Malaysia, IKATAN), and reestablished it as the National Justice Party (Parti Keadilan Nasional, KeADILan) on 4 April 1999. The new party leadership installed Wan Azizah as its inaugural president and positioned the organisation as a multi-ethnic, reformist alternative to the ruling Barisan Nasional (BN). The timing allowed the party to contest the 1999 general election.

=== Arrests ===
Between 27 and 30 September 1999, seven activists, including KeADILan leaders; Vice President Tian Chua, N. Gobalakrishnan, Youth Chief Mohamad Ezam Mohd Nor, Mohamed Azmin Ali, Fairus Izuddin and Badrul Amin Baharun; were arrested and consequently barred from contesting the election. Further arrests were made on 10 April 2001, and those arrested were later charged and imprisoned under the Internal Security Act. They became known as the Reformasi 10.

=== 1999 general election ===
The National Justice Party entered electoral politics immediately, contesting the 1999 general election. The party also joined with other opposition parties in the Barisan Alternatif (BA) coalition to present a united front against Barisan Nasional in multiple constituencies. In the election, KeADILan won several parliamentary seats, most notably in Permatang Pauh, the former seat of Anwar Ibrahim where his wife, Wan Azizah, was elected. The 1999 results consolidated KeADILan's position as a new centre of opposition politics despite the ruling coalition retaining overall parliamentary dominance.

=== Merger into Parti Keadilan Rakyat ===
After the 1999 general election, there was a growing consensus that KeADILan and the Malaysian People's Party (PRM) needed to merge based on their shared commitment to Reformasi and opposition to injustice and abuse of power. Following the 1999–2002 period of consolidation, negotiations were held for a potential merger between KeADILan and PRM. Thus, on 3 August 2003, the two parties formally merged to establish the People's Justice Party (PKR) in Kuala Lumpur. However, approval for the merger and PKR's subsequent establishment was only granted in 2004 after the general election. The merger combined KeADILan's urban reformist base with PRM's socialist legacy, producing a broader national party structure under Wan Azizah's leadership with PRM president Syed Husin Ali serving as her deputy. Meanwhile, Anwar Ibrahim was designated as an advisor and symbolic figurehead while he served his prison sentence. The merger and the party's subsequent evolution were noted by scholars as successful in establishing PKR as a durable multi-ethnic reformist party in Malaysia's changing party system.

=== Legacy ===
The National Justice Party represents the immediate institutionalisation of the Reformasi movement into party politics. Its establishment under Wan Azizah, rapid mobilisation in 1999, and the later merger to form PKR are widely regarded as key developments in Malaysia's post-1998 political realignment. The party's multi-ethnic, reformist orientation and its linkage to the broader Reformasi agenda laid the foundations for PKR's subsequent role in coalition politics and eventual participation in the federal government.

== Organisational structure ==
Inaugural Party Committee on 4 April 1999
Position	Name
President	Wan Azizah Wan Ismail
Deputy President	Chandra Muzaffar
Vice President	Sheikh Azmi Ahmad
Vice President	Marina Yusof
Vice President	Chua Tian Chang
Secretary-General	Mohd Anuar Mohd Tahir
Treasurer	Ramli Ibrahim
Information Chief	Ruslan Kasim
Youth Chief	Mohamad Ezam Mohd Nor
Women's Chief	Nell Onn
Deputy Youth Chief	Mustaffa Kamil Ayub
Deputy Women's Chief	Fuziah Salleh

Position	Name	Name
Committee Members	Mohd Nor Nawawi	Halili Rahmat
Committee Members	Ng Lum Yong	Irene Fernandez
Committee Members	Goh Keat Peng	Saifuddin Nasution Ismail
Committee Members	Sahri Bahari	Ismail Hamid
Committee Members	Johari Abdul	Mansor Othman
Committee Members	Khalil Shah Jamaluddin	Ghazali Basri
Committee Members	Zainur Zakaria	Mohamad Rafie Abd Malek
Committee Members	Omar Jaafar	Kahar Ahmad
Committee Members	Abdul Wahid Ahmad Suhaime	Nik Aziz Nik Hassan
Committee Members	Yusuf Abdul Rahman	Abdul Rahman Yusof

== Election results ==
The National Justice Party (KeADILan) participated in two general elections before the Registrar of Societies (RoS) approved the name change to the People's Justice Party (PKR), namely in 1999 and 2004. In the 2004 election, candidates from the Malaysian People's Party (PRM) contested on the KeADILan ticket as the merger of the two parties had yet to be approved.

=== 1999 Malaysian general election ===
In the 1999 general election, KeADILan fielded 59 candidates for parliamentary seats and 94 candidates for state assembly seats. Of these, 5 candidates were successfully elected to the Dewan Rakyat, while 4 were elected to the state assemblies, one each from Penang, Perak, Pahang, and Selangor.

==== 1999 parliamentary election results ====
No.	Constituency	State	Candidate	Result
P001	Padang Besar	Perlis	Mohd Anuar Mohd Tahir	Lost
P014	Merbok	Kedah	Mokhtar Mansor	Lost
P015	Sungai Petani	Kedah	Johari Abdul	Lost
P017	Padang Serai	Kedah	Saifuddin Nasution Ismail	Lost
P018	Kulim-Bandar Baharu	Kedah	Syeikh Azmi Ahmad	Lost
P021	Kota Bharu	Kelantan	Ramli Ibrahim	Won
P026	Peringat	Kelantan	Muhamad Mustafa	Won
P027	Tanah Merah	Kelantan	Saupi Daud	Won
P040	Kemaman	Terengganu	Abdul Rahman Yusof	Won
P042	Tasek Gelugor	Pulau Pinang	Ahmad Rosli Ayub	Lost
P044	Permatang Pauh	Pulau Pinang	Wan Azizah Wan Ismail	Won
P051	Balik Pulau	Pulau	Mansor Othman	Lost
P053	Larut	Perak	Muhammad Nur Manuty	Lost
P058	Chenderoh	Perak	Hamzah Mohd Zain	Lost
P069	Tapah	Perak	Kamaruddin Awang Teh	Lost
P070	Pasir Salak	Perak	Osman Abdul Rahman	Lost
P071	Lumut	Perak	Zamanhuri Samsudin	Lost
P072	Bagan Datoh	Perak	Mohamad Dahalan Arshad	Lost
P074	Tanjung Malim	Perak	Ng Nam Yeong	Lost
P078	Kuantan	Pahang	Fuziah Salleh	Lost
P079	Paya Besar	Pahang	Wan Jusoh Wan Kolok	Lost
P083	Bentong	Pahang	Abd Wahab Sudin	Lost
P086	Sabak Bernam	Selangor	Ghazali Basri	Lost
P088	Hulu Selangor	Selangor	Halili Rahmat	Lost
P092	Ampang Jaya	Selangor	Sivarasa Rasiah	Lost
P093	Hulu Langat	Selangor	Mohd Nor Nawawi	Lost
P097	Subang	Selangor	Irene Fernandez	Lost
P098	Shah Alam	Selangor	Mohamad Ezam Mohd Nor	Lost
P101	Kuala Langat	Selangor	Saari Sungib	Lost
P105	Wangsa Maju	Wilayah Persekutuan	Marina Yusof	Lost
P109	Lembah Pantai	Wilayah Persekutuan	Zainur Zakaria	Lost
P112	Bandar Tun Razak	Wilayah Persekutuan	Chandra Muzaffar	Lost
P113	Jelebu	Negeri Sembilan	Jaafar Muhammad	Lost
P116	Kuala Pilah	Negeri Sembilan	Ruslan Kasim	Lost
P121	Selandar	Melaka	Chua Tian Chang	Lost
P122	Batu Berendam	Melaka	Khalid Jaafar	Lost
P126	Ledang	Johor	Jamaluddin Khalid	Lost
P127	Pagoh	Johor	Elias Shamsir	Lost
P133	Muar	Johor	Abdul Rahman Othman	Lost
P136	Tenggara	Johor	Lokman Noor Adam	Lost
P139	Kota Tinggi	Johor	Rosdin Taha Abdul Rahman	Lost
P142	Pulai	Johor	Ismail Awab	Lost
P144	Pontian	Johor	Diong Chi Tzon	Lost
P155	Sipitang	Sabah	Abdul Rahman Md Yakub	Lost
P160	Libaran	Sabah	Mudry Nasir	Lost
P163	Silam	Sabah	Badrul Amin Bahron	Lost
P167	Santubong	Sarawak	Husaini Hamdan	Lost
P168	Petra Jaya	Sarawak	Wan Zainal Wan Senusi	Lost
P171	Kota Samarahan	Sarawak	Zulrusdi Mohd Hol	Lost
P174	Batang Sadong	Sarawak	Sahari Pet	Lost
P176	Sri Aman	Sarawak	Maxwell Rojis	Lost
P177	Lubok Antu	Sarawak	David Jemut	Lost
P179	Saratok	Sarawak	Idris Bohari	Lost
P180	Kuala Rajang	Sarawak	Udie Salleh	Lost
P183	Kanowit	Sarawak	Tadong Tambi	Lost
P186	Mukah	Sarawak	Yusuf Abdul Rahman	Lost
P187	Selangau	Sarawak	Ricky Bernard Betti	Lost
P188	Kapit	Sarawak	Nor Azman Abdullah Baginda	Lost
P193	Bukit Mas	Sarawak	Charlee Soh Cheng Hiong	Lost

==== 1999 state election results ====
No.	Constituency	State	Candidate	Result
N12	Penanti	Pulau Pinang	Abdul Rahman Abdul Kadir	Won
N34	Bota	Perak	Usaili Alias	Won
N20	Cini	Pahang	Mohd Jafri Ab Rashid	Won
N18	Hulu Kelang	Selangor	Azmin Ali	Won

=== 2004 Malaysian general election ===
In the 2004 general election, KeADILan fielded 57 candidates for parliamentary seats and 146 candidates for state assembly seats. Of these, only Wan Azizah Wan Ismail was successfully elected to the Dewan Rakyat in the traditional stronghold of Permatang Pauh, and none were successfully elected to the state assemblies.

No.	Constituency	Candidate	Result
P044	Permatang Pauh	Wan Azizah Wan Ismail	Won
