= Chandra Muzaffar =

Malaysian politician and activist

Dr. Chandra Muzaffar
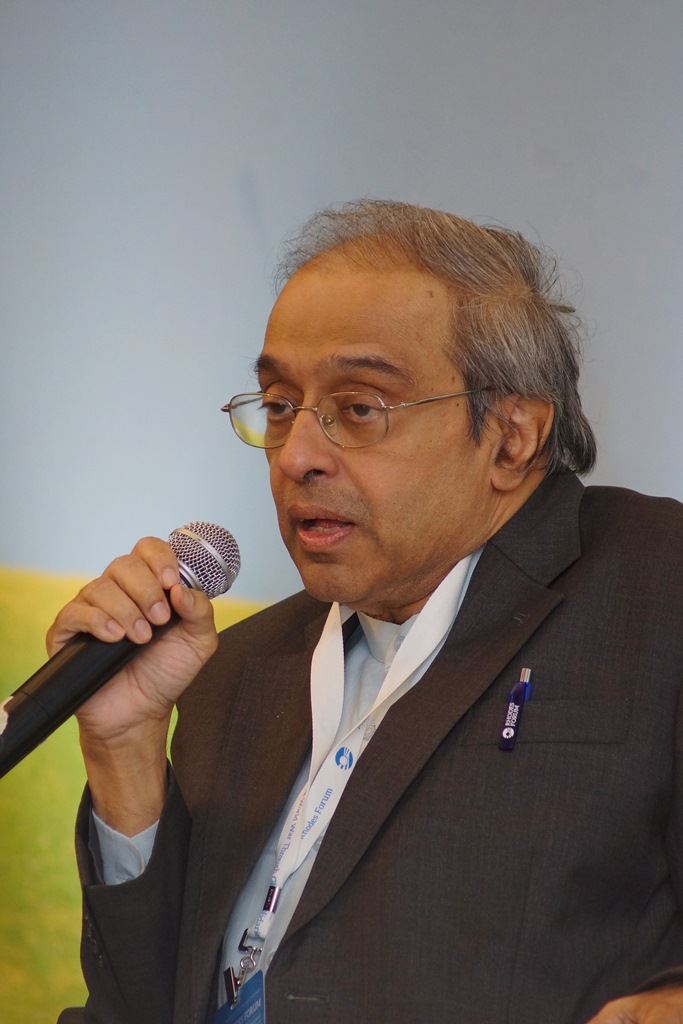
- Chandra Muzaffar in 2014

1st Deputy President of the National Justice Party
- In office 4 April 1999 – 11 November 2001
- Leader: Wan Azizah Wan Ismail
- Preceded by: Office established
- Succeeded by: Abdul Rahman Othman

Personal details
- Born: 10 March 1947 (age 79) Bedong, Kedah, Malayan Union
- Citizenship: Malaysia
- Party: KeADILan (1999–2001); Independent (2001–present)
- Other political affiliations: Barisan Alternatif (1999–2001)
- Education: University of Singapore; Universiti Sains Malaysia
- Occupation: Politician

Chandra Muzaffar (born 10 March 1947) is a Malaysian intellectual, social activist and politician. He is known for his work on human rights, inter-civilisational dialogue, and global justice. Over a career spanning several decades, he has founded major non-governmental organisations (NGOs) and held senior academic chairs at prominent Malaysian universities where he promoted democratic reform and interfaith understanding. He played a significant role in the early stages of the Reformasi movement as an opposition political leader, serving as the first Deputy President of the National Justice Party (KeADILan) from 1999 to 2001.

== Early life and education ==
Chandra Muzaffar was born on 10 March 1947 in Bedong, Kedah, into a Malaysian Indian family of Malayali descent with ancestral roots in Kerala, India. His mother was a third-generation Malaysian, while his father, P. N. Pillai, had been born and raised in India before migrating to Malaya in the 1930s. Chandra was the only son among four siblings. At the age of four, he contracted polio, which permanently affected his physical mobility throughout his life.

He received his primary education at Bedong English School before attending Ibrahim Secondary School in Sungai Petani. However, he completed his upper secondary education at Kolej Sultan Abdul Hamid in Alor Setar. Chandra later relocated to Singapore in the late 1960s to pursue his higher education, enrolling at the University of Singapore in 1967 to pursue a bachelor's degree in philosophy, politics and history, eventually specialising in politics. He then returned to Malaysia to undertake a Master's degree at Universiti Sains Malaysia (USM) in Penang. His thesis focused on Malaysian politics and involved extensive fieldwork with Malay-Muslim leaders from the Malaysian Islamic Party (PAS). Afterwards, he relocated to Singapore in 1975 to pursue his postgraduate research at the University of Singapore. In 1977, he was awarded a Doctor of Philosophy (PhD) in Social Sciences. His doctorate research focused on the dynamics of leadership, sycophancy, and political power structures within Malay society, which formed the basis of his landmark 1979 book, Protector.

== Academic career ==
Chandra's academic career spans several decades, with research focused on political philosophy, international relations, interfaith dialogue, and the social impacts of globalisation. Much of his work examines the relationship between religious reform and universal human rights. On 1 March 1997, he was appointed as the inaugural Professor and Director of the newly established Centre for Civilisational Dialogue at the University of Malaya (UM) in Kuala Lumpur. During his tenure, which lasted until 1999, he worked to establish formal frameworks for cross-cultural and multi-faith academic dialogue. His leadership focused on identifying common ethical values across major religious and philosophical traditions, challenging the "clash of civilisations" theory by promoting a shared global foundation for human dignity.

Following a period spent largely in civil society and mainstream politics, Chandra returned to full-time academia in 2007. He was appointed the Noordin Sopiee Professor of Global Studies at Universiti Sains Malaysia (USM) in Penang, holding the research chair until 2012. In this role, his lecturing and academic research focused on imbalances in global governance, international justice, and Western geopolitical influence. In recognition of his long association with USM, where he had also studied for his master's degree, the university's alumni association later presented him with its Outstanding Member Award.

Over his career, Chandra has authored or edited more than 30 books in both English and Malay. His early books, such as "Protector" (1979) and "Islamic Resurgence in Malaysia" (1987), became foundational texts on Malaysian politics and religious revivalism. His later work, including "Human Rights and the New World Order" (1993) and "Muslims, Dialogue, Terror" (2003), expanded into global international relations. Chandra's academic work has also earned international recognition. He received the Rockefeller Social Science Fellowship in Development Studies for Southeast Asia in 1984. In 1989, the Association for Asian Studies (AAS) awarded him the Harry J. Benda Prize, a prestigious international honour for outstanding scholars of Southeast Asian studies. Additionally, he has served on the advisory boards of several international academic networks and think-tanks focused on cultural relations and global ethics.

== Political career ==
=== Reformasi movement ===
From 1977 to 1991, Chandra was the founder and president of the National Consciousness Movement (Aliran), a multiethnic social reform movement advocating for justice, freedom and solidarity. However, his direct involvement in party politics only began in late 1998, driven by the political crisis caused by the dismissal and subsequent arrest of former Deputy Prime Minister Anwar Ibrahim. The incident triggered widespread public protests and gave rise to the Reformasi movement, which sought to challenge the long-standing rule of the Barisan Nasional (BN) coalition under Prime Minister Mahathir Mohamad. As a prominent civil society leader, Chandra aligned with other activists, academics, and opposition figures to establish a structured political platform for the movement. These efforts led to the creation of the Movement for Social Justice (ADIL), a non-governmental organisation that served as the precursor to a formal political party. On 4 April 1999, the political vehicle was officially launched as the National Justice Party (KeADILan). Chandra was appointed as the party's inaugural deputy president, serving alongside the party's president, Wan Azizah Wan Ismail. In this leadership capacity, Chandra became a key strategist for the party, working to bridge the ideological gaps between different ethnic and political factions within the newly formed Barisan Alternatif (BA) alliance. He advocated for a multiracial political model that would offer a viable alternative to the race-based structure of the ruling coalition. However, he simultaneously upholds the established position of Islam and the Malay community in the national framework.

During the 1999 general election, Chandra contested the federal constituency of Bandar Tun Razak in Kuala Lumpur under the KeADILan banner. His election campaign in the urban, mixed-demographic constituency focused heavily on governance, institutional reforms, and economic stability amid the 1997 Asian financial crisis. Chandra faced the incumbent Member of Parliament, Tan Chai Ho of the Malaysian Chinese Association (MCA), a component party of the ruling Barisan Nasional. In a closely watched contest, Chandra narrowly lost the seat, securing 21,049 votes (48.6%) against Tan's 22,273 votes (51.4%). Despite narrowly losing by 1,224 votes, the results were a significant overperformance in a seat where the ruling coalition previously won with 68.1% of the vote.

=== Departure from party politics ===
Following the 1999 election, internal debates emerged within KeADILan regarding its long-term direction and ideological identity. While Chandra was highly respected for his intellectualism and ethical stances, his academic and analytical approach to leadership faced criticism from factions accustomed to traditional grassroots mobilisation. In April 2001, rumours began circulating regarding Chandra's impending departure from the party hierarchy. Political observers attributed his decision to frustration over the pullout of the Democratic Action Party (DAP) from Barisan Alternatif, along with the uncompromising stance of PAS on the Islamic state concept. While he initially deferred a formal announcement to consult party colleagues, he subsequently decided not to seek re-election during that year's party elections. He officially stepped down as deputy president on 11 November 2001 and was succeeded by Abdul Rahman Othman, concluding his tenure in formal party politics. Chandra stated that his decision was motivated by a desire to return to his primary work in civil society and research. Following his departure, the party went through a series of structural transformations, eventually merging with the socialist Malaysian People's Party (PRM) in 2003 to form the People's Justice Party (PKR).

=== Later career ===
After his retirement from active politics, Chandra returned to independent social commentary. He focused his efforts on leading the International Movement for a Just World (JUST), a non-governmental organisation dedicated to "creating a just world". In the subsequent decades, his political stances shifted, leading to public disagreements with his former political allies. He became a critic of the opposition leadership, expressing scepticism over the ideological consistency and political motivations of the parties that later formed Pakatan Rakyat (PR). Chandra argued that coalitions formed primarily for electoral gains rather than shared principles lacked long-term stability. Concurrently, his commentary began aligning more closely with several government-backed initiatives. In 2009, he was appointed chairman of the Board of Trustees for the 1Malaysia Foundation. His political realignment drew mixed reactions, with some observers criticising it as a departure from his early anti-establishment activism.

== Personal life ==
Chandra Muzaffar is married to Mariam Mohd Hashim. The couple has two daughters, including Anisa Muzaffar and Samirah Muzaffar. Chandra contracted polio at the age of four, an illness that permanently impacted his physical mobility. Throughout his adult life, he has frequently utilised a wheelchair. Raised in a Hindu household, Chandra converted to Islam in early 1974. He had developed a strong interest in theology and the social purpose of religion during his teenage years and began reading extensively across different faiths, including Hinduism, Christianity, and the Baháʼí Faith. In the early 1970s, while conducting field research for his master's degree, he interacted extensively with Malay-Muslim political figures in Penang, influencing his subsequent embrace of Islam.

== Works ==
- Protector (1979)
- Universalism of Islam (1979)
- Islamic Resurgence in Malaysia (1987)
- Human Rights and the New World Order (1993)
- Alternative Politics for Asia: A Buddhist-Muslim Dialogue (1999)
- Rights, Religion and Reform (2002)
- Global Ethic or Global Hegemony? (2005)
- Hegemony: Justice; Peace (2008)
- Religion & Governance (2009)

== Election results ==
Parliament of Malaysia
Year	Constituency	Candidate	Votes	Pct	Opponent(s)	Votes	Pct	Ballots cast	Majority	Turnout
1999	P112 Bandar Tun Razak	Chandra Muzaffar (keADILan)	21,049	48.59%	Tan Chai Ho (MCA)	22,273	51.41%	45,041	1,224	76.10%
