= International Movement for a Just World =

Malaysia-based non-governmental organisation

- Abbreviation: JUST
- Founder: Dr Chandra Muzaffar
- Founded at: Kuala Lumpur, Malaysia
- Type: Non-profit organisation
- Legal status: Foundation
- Headquarters: Kuala Lumpur
- Location: Malaysia
- Region served: Malaysia
- President: Dr Chandra Muzaffar
- Website: www.just-international.org

International Movement for a Just World (JUST) is an international NGO based in Malaysia. It was founded by the social activist and academic Chandra Muzaffar, the current president.
