= Tumpat (federal constituency) =

Federal constituency of Kelantan, Malaysia

Tumpat (P019)
Kelantan constituency
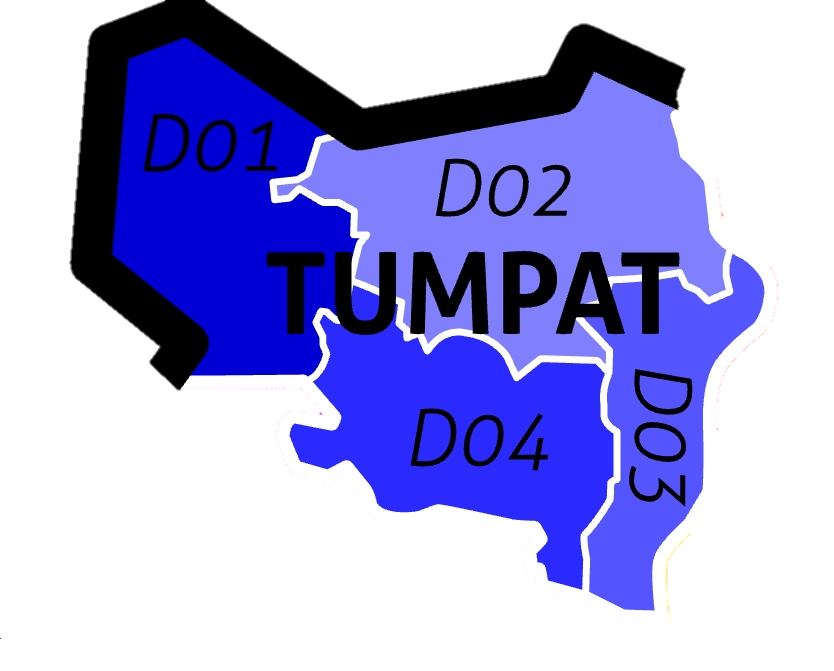

Federal constituency
- Legislature: Dewan Rakyat
- MP: Mumtaz Md. Nawi; PN
- Constituency created: 1958
- First contested: 1959
- Last contested: 2022

Demographics
- Population (2020): 179,944
- Electors (2023): 150,248
- Area (km²): 180
- Pop. density (per km²): 999.7

Tumpat is a federal constituency in Tumpat District, Kelantan, Malaysia, that has been represented in the Dewan Rakyat since 1959.

The federal constituency was created in the 1958 redistribution and is mandated to return a single member to the Dewan Rakyat under the first past the post voting system.

== Demographics ==
Ethnic breakdown of Tumpat's electorate as of 2022
1. Malay (92.7%)
2. Chinese (3.90%)
3. Other ethnicities (2.90%)
4. Indian (0.50%)
Age breakdown of Tumpat's electorate as of 2022
1. 18-20 (6.97%)
2. 21-29 (23.3%)
3. 30-39 (23.7%)
4. 40-49 (16.7%)
5. 50-59 (13.3%)
6. 60-69 (9.54%)
7. 70-79 (4.56%)
8. 80-89 (1.47%)
9. above 90 (0.47%)
Gender breakdown of Tumpat's electorate as of 2022
1. Male (50.0%)
2. Female (50.0%)

== History ==
=== Polling districts ===
According to the federal gazette issued on 18 July 2023, the Tumpat constituency is divided into 52 polling districts.

State constituency	Polling Districts	Code	Location
Pengkalan Kubor (N01）	Pengkalan Kubor	019/01/01	SK Pengkalan Kubor (1)
Pengkalan Kubor (N01）	Kampung Ketil	019/01/02	SK Pengkalan Kubor (2)
Pengkalan Kubor (N01）	Kampung Tebing	019/01/03	SMU (A) Meheliah Getting
Pengkalan Kubor (N01）	Kampung Geting	019/01/04	SK Geting (1)
Pengkalan Kubor (N01）	Simpangan	019/01/05	SK Simpangan
Pengkalan Kubor (N01）	Tujoh	019/01/06	MRSM Tumpat
Pengkalan Kubor (N01）	Telaga Bata	019/01/07	SK Bunohan
Pengkalan Kubor (N01）	Bunohan	019/01/08	SK Bunohan
Pengkalan Kubor (N01）	Jubakar Darat	019/01/09	SK Sri Neting
Pengkalan Kubor (N01）	Kampung Bendang Pak Yong	019/01/10	SK Bendang Pa' Yong
Pengkalan Kubor (N01）	Kampung Telok Jering	019/01/11	SK Teluk Jering
Pengkalan Kubor (N01）	Kedai Geting	019/01/12	SMK Putting
Kelaboran (N02）	Jubakar Pantai	019/02/01	SK Sungai Tapang
Kelaboran (N02）	Dalam Rhu	019/02/02	SK Tumpat
Kelaboran (N02）	Bandar Tumpat	019/02/03	SK Tumpat (1)
Kelaboran (N02）	Tanjong Kuala	019/02/04	SK Sri Tumpat (2)
Kelaboran (N02）	Kampung Besut	019/02/05	Kompleks Perpaduan Jajahan Tumpat
Kelaboran (N02）	Kampung Kelong	016/02/06	Maahad Muhammadi Tumpat
Kelaboran (N02）	Kampung Berangan	016/02/07	SK Berangan (1)
Kelaboran (N02）	Kampung Padang Tembesu	019/02/08	SMK Berangan
Kelaboran (N02）	Terbak	019/02/09	SJK (C) Yuk Tze
Kelaboran (N02）	Kelaboran	019/02/10	SK Kelaboran
Kelaboran (N02）	Pulau Beluru	019/02/11	SK Pulau Beluru
Kelaboran (N02）	Mak Neralang	019/02/12	SK Kok Keli
Kelaboran (N02）	Sungai Pinang	019/02/13	SK Sungai Pinang
Kelaboran (N02）	Kok Keli	019/02/14	SK Kok Keli
Pasir Pekan（N03）	Kampung Bendang Pulau	019/03/01	SK Kampong Laut
Pasir Pekan（N03）	Kampung Laut	019/03/02	SMK Kampong Laut
Pasir Pekan（N03）	Kok Pasir	019/03/03	SK Kok Pasir
Pasir Pekan（N03）	Morak	019/03/04	SK Morak
Pasir Pekan（N03）	Palekbang	019/03/05	SK Palekbang
Pasir Pekan（N03）	Pasir Pekan Hilir	019/03/06	SK Padang Pohon Tanjung
Pasir Pekan（N03）	Paloh	019/03/07	SMU (A) Bustanus Saadah Morak
Pasir Pekan（N03）	Pasir Pekan	019/03/08	SK Pasir Pekan
Pasir Pekan（N03）	Kampung Bharu Sungai	019/03/09	SMK Mahmud Mahyiddin
Pasir Pekan（N03）	Kutan	019/03/10	SMK Kutan
Pasir Pekan（N03）	Alor Pasir	019/03/11	SMK Wakaf Bharu
Pasir Pekan（N03）	Kampung Dalam Kota Kubang Labu	019/03/12	SMA Falahiah
Wakaf Bharu (N04)	Kampung Pasir Puteh	019/04/01	SMK Chabang Empat
Wakaf Bharu (N04)	Cherang Melintang	019/04/02	SK Teluk Jering
Wakaf Bharu (N04)	Kampung Tok Oh	019/04/03	SK Padang Mandol
Wakaf Bharu (N04)	Kampung Periok	019/04/04	SMU (A) Tarbiah Islamiah
Wakaf Bharu (N04)	Bunut Sarang Burong	019/04/05	SMU (A) Tarbiah Diniah Tahfiz
Wakaf Bharu (N04)	Kebakat	019/04/06	SK Kebakat Jaya
Wakaf Bharu (N04)	Chenderong Batu	019/04/07	SK Chenderong Batu
Wakaf Bharu (N04)	Kampung Kubang Batang	019/04/08	SK Kubang Batang
Wakaf Bharu (N04)	Chabang Empat	019/04/09	SMK Chabang Empat
Wakaf Bharu (N04)	Kampung Jal Besar	019/04/10	SK Chabang Empat
Wakaf Bharu (N04)	Jal Kechil	019/04/11	SK Padang Mandol
Wakaf Bharu (N04)	Wakaf Delima	019/04/12	SK Kampong Delima
Wakaf Bharu (N04)	Kampung Belukar	019/04/13	SK Seri Wakaf Baharu
Wakaf Bharu (N04)	Wakaf Bharu Kedai	019/04/14	SK Wakaf Bharu

=== Representation history ===
Members of Parliament for Tumpat
Parliament	No	Years	Member	Party	Vote Share
Constituency created from Kelantan Utara
Parliament of the Federation of Malaya
1st	P015	1959–1963	Hassan Ahmad (حسّان أحمد)	PMIP	10,249; 61.63%
Parliament of Malaysia
1st	P015	1963–1964	Hassan Ahmad (حسّان أحمد)	PMIP	10,249; 61.63%
2nd	P015	1964–1969	Wan Hassan Wan Daud (وان حسّان وان داود)	PMIP	10,248; 50.47%
		1969–1971	Parliament was suspended		
3rd	P015	1971–1973	Abdul Aziz Omar (عبدالعزيز عمر)	Alliance (UMNO)	12,802; 55.00%
3rd	P015	1973-1974	Abdul Aziz Omar (عبدالعزيز عمر)	BN (UMNO)	12,802; 55.00%
4th	P016	1974–1978	Tengku Noor Asiah Tengku Ahmad (تڠكو نور آسية تڠكو احمد)	BN (UMNO)	16,494; 70.45%
5th	P016	1978–1982	Tengku Noor Asiah Tengku Ahmad (تڠكو نور آسية تڠكو احمد)	BN (UMNO)	14,460; 58.62%
6th	P016	1982–1986	Dusuki Ahmad (دسوقي أحمد)	BN (UMNO)	16,087; 53.54%
7th	P017	1986–1990	Dusuki Ahmad (دسوقي أحمد)	BN (UMNO)	16,760; 52.69%
8th	P017	1990–1995	Wan Mohd. Jamil Wan Mahmood (وان محمّد جامل وان محمود)	APU (PAS)	24,578; 64.93%
9th	P019	1995–1999	Wan Mohd. Jamil Wan Mahmood (وان محمّد جامل وان محمود)	APU (PAS)	17,682; 52.87%
10th	P019	1999–2004	Kamarudin Jaffar (قمرالدين جعفر)	BA (PAS)	23,218; 64.51%
11th	P019	2004–2008	Kamarudin Jaffar (قمرالدين جعفر)	PAS	27,919; 51.68%
12th	P019	2008–2013	Kamarudin Jaffar (قمرالدين جعفر)	PR (PAS)	36,714; 57.32%
13th	P019	2013–2015	Kamarudin Jaffar (قمرالدين جعفر)	PR (PAS)	46,191; 56.55%
13th	P019	2015–2018	Kamarudin Jaffar (قمرالدين جعفر)	PH (PKR)	46,191; 56.55%
14th	P019	2018–2020	Che Abdullah Mat Nawi (چئ عبدالله مت نوى)	GS (PAS)	47,041; 54.33%
14th	P019	2020–2022	Che Abdullah Mat Nawi (چئ عبدالله مت نوى)	PN (PAS)	47,041; 54.33%
15th	P019	2022–present	Mumtaz Md Nawi (ممتاز محمد نوي)	PN (PAS)	65,426; 62.51%

=== State constituency ===
Parliamentary constituency	State constituency						
Parliamentary constituency	1955–1959*	1959–1974	1974–1986	1986–1995	1995–2004	2004–2018	2018–present
Tumpat				Geting			
Tumpat					Kelaboran		
Tumpat					Pasir Pekan		
Tumpat					Pengkalan Kubor		
Tumpat			Simpangan				
Tumpat			Sungei Pinang				
Tumpat		Tumpat Barat					
Tumpat		Tumpat Tengah					
Tumpat		Tumpat Timor					
Tumpat			Wakaf Bharu			Wakaf Bharu	

=== Historical boundaries ===
State Constituency	Area					
State Constituency	1959	1974	1984	1994	2003	2018
Geting			Bunohan; Geting; Pengkalan Kubor; Kampung Baru Nelayan; Tumpat			
Kelaboran				Kampung Baru Nelayan; Kampung Berangan; Kampung Cherang; Kampung Besut; Tumpat		Kampung Baru Nelayan; Kampung Besut; Kampung Chat; Kampung Jal Besar; Kelaboran
Pasir Pekan				Kampung Kok Keli; Kampung Kok Pasir; Kampung Lama; Kampung Wakaf King; Palekbang	Kampung Kok Keli; Kampung Kok Pasir; Kampung Lama; Kampung Paloh; Palekbang	Kampung Kok Pasir; Kampung Lama; Kampung Paloh; Palekbang; Pasir Pekan
Pengkalan Kubor				Bunohan; Kedai Geting; Pengkalan Kubor; Simpangan; Telaga Bata		
Simpangan		Bunohan; Geting; Pengkalan Kubor; Kampung Baru Nelayan; Tumpat				
Sungei Pinang		Kampung Besut; Kampung Kok Keli; Kampung Kok Pasir; Padang Tembesu; Sungai Pinang				
Tumpat Barat	Bunohan; Kampung Jal Besar; Kampung Talak; Kampung Telaga Lanas; Pengkalan Kubor					
Tumpat Tengah	Bendang Luas; Kampung Berangan; Kok Keli; Padang Temusu; Tumpat					
Tumpat Timor	Chabang Empat; Kampung Kulim; Kebakat; Kubang Batang; Wakaf Bharu					
Wakaf Bharu		Chabang Empat; Kampung Kulim; Kampung Pulau Raja; Kebakat; Kubang Batang			Chabang Empat; Kampung Kulim; Kebakat; Kubang Batang; Wakaf Bharu	Chabang Empat; Kampung Cherang; Kebakat; Kubang Batang; Wakaf Bharu

=== Current state assembly members ===
No.	State Constituency	Member	Coalition (Party)
N01	Pengkalan Kubor	Wan Roslan Wan Hamat	PN (PAS)
N02	Kelaboran	Mohd Adenan Hassan	PN (PAS)
N03	Pasir Pekan	Ahmad Yaakob	PN (PAS)
N04	Wakaf Bharu	Mohd Rusli Abdullah	PN (PAS)

=== Local governments & postcodes ===
No.	State Constituency	Local Government	Postcode
N01	Pengkalan Kubor	Tumpat District Council	16040, 16250 Wakaf Bharu; 16200, 16210 Tumpat
N02	Kelaboran	Tumpat District Council	16040, 16250 Wakaf Bharu; 16200, 16210 Tumpat
N03	Pasir Pekan	Tumpat District Council	16040, 16250 Wakaf Bharu; 16200, 16210 Tumpat
N04	Wakaf Bharu	Tumpat District Council	16040, 16250 Wakaf Bharu; 16200, 16210 Tumpat

== Election results ==
Malaysian general election, 2022
Party	Candidate	Votes	%	∆%
PAS	Mumtaz Md. Nawi	65,426	62.51	▲8.18
BN	Che Abdullah Mat Nawi	30,633	29.27	▼4.85
PH	Wan Ahmad Johari Wan Omar	7,762	7.42	▲7.42
PUTRA	Che Mohamad Aswari Che Ali	593	0.57	▲0.57
Heritage	Khairul Azwan Kamarrudin	245	0.23	▲0.23
Total valid votes		104,659	100.00	
Total rejected ballots		1,233		
Unreturned ballots		281		
Turnout		106,131	70.07	▼9.92
Registered electors		149,371		
Majority		34,793	33.24	▲13.03
PAS hold		Swing		
Source(s) https://lom.agc.gov.my/ilims/upload/portal/akta/outputp/1753266/PUB%20607%20(2022).pdf

Malaysian general election, 2018
Party	Candidate	Votes	%	∆%
PAS	Che Abdullah Mat Nawi	47,041	54.33	▼2.22
BN	Wan Johani Wan Hussin	29,541	34.12	▼9.33
PKR	Nordin Salleh	10,003	11.55	▲11.55
Total valid votes		86,585	100.00	
Total rejected ballots		1,402		
Unreturned ballots		746		
Turnout		88,733	79.99	▼4.12
Registered electors		110,924		
Majority		17,500	20.21	▲7.11
PAS hold		Swing		
Source(s) "His Majesty's Government Gazette - Notice of Contested Election, Parliament for the State of Kelantan [P.U. (B) 234/2018]" (PDF). Attorney General's Chambers of Malaysia. 3 May 2018. "Federal Government Gazette - Results of Contested Election and Statements of the Poll after the Official Addition of Votes, Parliamentary Constituencies for the State of Kelantan [P.U. (B) 308/2018]" (PDF). Attorney General's Chambers of Malaysia. 28 May 2018.

Malaysian general election, 2013
Party	Candidate	Votes	%	∆%
PAS	Kamarudin Jaffar	46,191	56.55	▼0.77
BN	Mansor Salleh	35,487	43.45	▲0.77
Total valid votes		81,678	100.00	
Total rejected ballots		1,086		
Unreturned ballots		198		
Turnout		82,962	84.11	▲2.62
Registered electors		98,632		
Majority		10,704	13.10	▼1.54
PAS hold		Swing		
Source(s) "Federal Government Gazette - Notice of Contested Election, Parliament for the State of Kelantan [P.U. (B) 171/2013]" (PDF). Attorney General's Chambers of Malaysia. 26 April 2013. "Federal Government Gazette - Results of Contested Election and Statements of the Poll after the Official Addition of Votes, Parliamentary Constituencies for the State of Kelantan [P.U. (B) 212/2013]" (PDF). Attorney General's Chambers of Malaysia. 22 May 2013.

Malaysian general election, 2008
Party	Candidate	Votes	%	∆%
PAS	Kamarudin Jaffar	36,714	57.32	▲5.64
BN	Asyraf Wajdi Dusuki	27,337	42.68	▼5.64
Total valid votes		64,051	100.00	
Total rejected ballots		1,032		
Unreturned ballots		171		
Turnout		65,254	81.49	▲3.69
Registered electors		80,072		
Majority		9,377	14.64	▲11.28
PAS hold		Swing		

Malaysian general election, 2004
Party	Candidate	Votes	%	∆%
PAS	Kamarudin Jaffar	27,919	51.68	▼12.83
BN	Mat Nawawi Mat Jusoh	26,099	48.32	▲12.83
Total valid votes		54,018	100.00	
Total rejected ballots		1,072		
Unreturned ballots		0		
Turnout		55,090	77.80	▲23.28
Registered electors		70,809		
Majority		1,820	3.36	▼25.66
PAS hold		Swing		

Malaysian general election, 1999
Party	Candidate	Votes	%	∆%
PAS	Kamarudin Jaffar	23,218	64.51	▲11.64
BN	Noor Zahidi Omar	12,776	35.49	▼11.64
Total valid votes		35,994	100.00	
Total rejected ballots		636		
Unreturned ballots		27		
Turnout		36,657	75.70	▲0.91
Registered electors		48,424		
Majority		10,442	29.02	▲23.28
PAS hold		Swing		

Malaysian general election, 1995
Party	Candidate	Votes	%	∆%
PAS	Wan Mohd. Jamil Wan Mahmood	17,682	52.87	▼12.06
BN	Kamarudin Jaffar	15,764	47.13	▲13.01
Total valid votes		33,446	100.00	
Total rejected ballots		990		
Unreturned ballots		117		
Turnout		34,553	74.79	▼1.95
Registered electors		46,200		
Majority		1,918	5.74	▼25.07
PAS hold		Swing		

Malaysian general election, 1990
Party	Candidate	Votes	%	∆%
PAS	Wan Mohd. Jamil Wan Mahmood	24,578	64.93	▲17.62
BN	Dusuki Ahmad	12,916	34.12	▼18.57
Independent	Wan Ab. Rahman Wan Hassan	358	0.95	▲0.95
Total valid votes		37,852	100.00	
Total rejected ballots		1,163		
Unreturned ballots		0		
Turnout		39,015	76.74	▲3.50
Registered electors		50,838		
Majority		11,662	30.81	▲25.43
PAS gain from BN		Swing		?

Malaysian general election, 1986
Party	Candidate	Votes	%	∆%
BN	Dusuki Ahmad	16,760	52.69	▼0.85
PAS	Hassan Salleh	15,050	47.31	▲0.85
Total valid votes		31,810	100.00	
Total rejected ballots		901		
Unreturned ballots		0		
Turnout		32,711	73.24	▼3.65
Registered electors		44,661		
Majority		1,710	5.38	▼1.70
BN hold		Swing		

Malaysian general election, 1982
Party	Candidate	Votes	%	∆%
BN	Dusuki Ahmad	16,087	53.54	▼5.08
PAS	Ismail Awang	13,962	46.46	▲5.08
Total valid votes		30,049	100.00	
Total rejected ballots		1,092		
Unreturned ballots		0		
Turnout		31,141	76.89	▲4.77
Registered electors		40,502		
Majority		2,125	7.08	▼10.16
BN hold		Swing		

Malaysian general election, 1978
Party	Candidate	Votes	%	∆%
BN	Tengku Noor Asiah Tengku Ahmad	14,460	58.62	▼11.83
PAS	Wan Mamat	10,206	41.38	▲41.38
Total valid votes		24,666	100.00	
Total rejected ballots		354		
Unreturned ballots		0		
Turnout		25,020	72.17	▲1.75
Registered electors		34,667		
Majority		4,254	17.24	▼23.66
BN hold		Swing		

Malaysian general election, 1974
Party	Candidate	Votes	%	∆%
BN	Tengku Noor Asiah Tengku Ahmad	16,494	70.45	▲70.45
Independent	Hassan Ishak	6,920	29.55	▲29.55
Total valid votes		23,414	100.00	
Total rejected ballots		1,036		
Unreturned ballots		0		
Turnout		24,450	70.42	▼6.92
Registered electors		34,719		
Majority		9,574	40.90	▲35.90
BN gain from Alliance		Swing		?

Malaysian general election, 1969
Party	Candidate	Votes	%	∆%
Alliance	Abdul Aziz Omar	12,802	55.00	▲5.47
PMIP	Nik Man Nik Mohamed	10,475	45.00	▼5.47
Total valid votes		23,277	100.00	
Total rejected ballots		788		
Unreturned ballots		0		
Turnout		24,065	77.34	▼4.69
Registered electors		31,115		
Majority		2,327	5.00	▲4.06
Alliance gain from PMIP		Swing		?

Malaysian general election, 1964
Party	Candidate	Votes	%	∆%
PMIP	Wan Hassan Wan Daud	10,248	50.47	▼11.16
Alliance	Che Lat Kassim	10,056	49.53	▲11.16
Total valid votes		20,304	100.00	
Total rejected ballots		931		
Unreturned ballots		0		
Turnout		21,235	82.03	▲13.36
Registered electors		25,887		
Majority		192	0.94	▼22.32
PMIP hold		Swing		

Malayan general election, 1959
Party	Candidate	Votes	%
PMIP	Hassan Ahmad	10,249	61.63
Alliance	Mahmood Zakariah	6,380	38.37
Total valid votes		16,629	100.00
Total rejected ballots		115	
Unreturned ballots		0	
Turnout		16,744	68.67
Registered electors		24,383	
Majority		3,869	23.26
This was a new constituency created.
