= Tan Chai Ho =

Malaysian politician

Yang Berbahagia Datuk Seri Tan Chai Ho SMW PJN KMN AMN
- 陈财和

Deputy Minister of Home Affairs
- In office 27 March 2004 – 18 March 2008
- Monarchs: Sirajuddin; Mizan Zainal Abidin
- Prime Minister: Abdullah Ahmad Badawi
- Minister: Azmi Khalid (2004–2006); Mohd Radzi Sheikh Ahmad (2006–2008)
- Preceded by: Zainal Abidin Zin
- Succeeded by: Wan Ahmad Farid Wan Salleh (Deputy Minister of Home Affairs I); Chor Chee Heung (Deputy Minister of Home Affairs II)
- Constituency: Bandar Tun Razak

Deputy Minister of Energy, Water and Communications
- In office 15 December 1999 – 26 March 2004
- Monarchs: Salahuddin; Sirajuddin
- Prime Minister: Mahathir Mohamad; Abdullah Ahmad Badawi
- Minister: Leo Moggie Irok
- Preceded by: Chan Kong Choy (Energy, Communications)
- Succeeded by: Shaziman Abu Mansor
- Constituency: Bandar Tun Razak

Member of the Malaysian Parliament for Bandar Tun Razak
- In office 25 April 1995 – 8 March 2008
- Preceded by: Constituency established
- Succeeded by: Abdul Khalid Ibrahim (PR–PKR)
- Majority: 14,735 (1995); 1,224 (1999); 17,527 (2004)

Personal details
- Born: 7 February 1949 (age 77) Selangor, Federation of Malaya (now Malaysia)
- Party: Malaysian Chinese Association (MCA)
- Other party: Barisan Nasional (BN); Perikatan Nasional (PN)
- Spouse: Kok Mew Chan (霍妙珍)
- Children: 4 (2 sons, 2 daughters)
- Occupation: Politician

Tan Chai Ho (simplified Chinese: 陈财和; traditional Chinese: 陳財和; pinyin: Chén Cáihé; Pe̍h-ōe-jī: Tân Châi-hô; born 7 February 1949) was Deputy Minister of Ministry of Home Affairs (Malaysia) from 29 March 2004 to 26 February 2008. He was a member of parliament of (P124) Bandar Tun Razak in Wilayah Persekutuan (Federal Territory) of Malaysia) representing the Barisan Nasional coalition for 3 terms until he lost to Tan Abdul Khalid Ibrahim of Parti Keadilan Rakyat (PKR) in the 2008 general election. He subsequently announced that he will retire from politics prior to the 2013 general election.

== Background and education ==
Tan Chai Ho was born on 7 February 1949 in Selangor. He underwent his primary education at SJK (C) Kepong, Kuala Lumpur from 1956 to 1961. He then completed his Senior Cambridge secondary education in 1967, and subsequently Form Six in 1969. His was a company secretary by profession. Before he enter politics, He involvedin his Family business in Company Secretarial Services and Director of Kojadi Cooperation

== Political career ==
Tan Chai Ho has served as Chairman of MCA Kepong Baru Division from 1976 to 1981, Chief of Kepong Division MCA Youth Wing and Deputy Chairman of MCA Youth Wing from 1981 to 1985, State Chairman of MCA Youth Wing from 1985 to 1990, Deputy Chairman of MCA National Youth Wing from 1987 to 1990, MCA Youth Movement Vanguard Chief from 1987 to 1990. In addition, he has been re-elected as the Central Committee of MCA in 1990. He also served as State Chairman of MCA Kuala Lumpur and Head of the National MCA Public Services and Complaints Bureau in 1990, Head of the National MCA Religious Bureau in 2005.

He has been appointed to the Dewan Negara in 1986 and has served as Parliamentary Secretary of the Ministry of Domestic Trade and Consumer Affairs on 11 May 1995 to 14 December 1999. After the 1999 general election, he was appointed as Deputy Minister of Energy, Communications and Multimedia by then Prime Minister Mahathir Mohamad on 15 December 1999 until March 2004. After the 2004 election, he served as Deputy Minister of Home Affairs until 2008.

In the 2008 general election, Tan Chai Ho unable retain Bandar Tun Razak parliamentary seat and lost to Abdul Khalid Ibrahim from People's Justice Party. In May 2010, he resigned as Chairman of the MCA Bandar Tun Razak Division.

== Election results ==
Parliament of Malaysia
Year	Constituency	Candidate	Votes	Pct	Opponent(s)	Votes	Pct	Ballots cast	Majority	Turnout
1990	P102 Sungai Besi	Tan Chai Ho (MCA)	23,313	40.99%	Tan Kok Wai (DAP)	32,169	56.56%	57,303	8,856	70.87%
1990	P102 Sungai Besi	Tan Chai Ho (MCA)	23,313	40.99%	Abdul Hamid Selamat (IND)	1,389	2.44%	57,303	8,856	70.87%
1995	P112 Bandar Tun Razak	Tan Chai Ho (MCA)	25,382	68.11%	Lee Yee Lian (DAP)	10,647	28.57%	38,326	14,735	71.39%
1995	P112 Bandar Tun Razak	Tan Chai Ho (MCA)	25,382	68.11%	Abd. Malek Hussin (PAS)	1,235	3.31%	38,326	14,735	71.39%
1999	P112 Bandar Tun Razak	Tan Chai Ho (MCA)	22,273	51.41%	Chandra Muzaffar (keADILan)	21,049	48.59%	45,041	1,224	76.10%
2004	P124 Bandar Tun Razak	Tan Chai Ho (MCA)	33,223	67.91%	Rosli Ibrahim (PKR)	15,696	32.09%	50,015	17,527	74.38%
2008	P124 Bandar Tun Razak	Tan Chai Ho (MCA)	25,608	47.66%	Abdul Khalid Ibrahim (PKR)	28,123	52.34%	54,995	2,515	75.72%

== Honours ==
- Malaysia
  - Commander of Order of Meritorious Service (PJN) – Datuk (1996)
  - Officer of the Order of the Defender of the Realm (KMN) (1990)
  - Member of the Order of the Defender of the Realm (AMN) (1983)
- Federal Territory (Malaysia)
  - Grand Commander of the Order of the Territorial Crown (SMW) – Datuk Seri (2009)
