= Che Abdullah Mat Nawi =

Malaysian politician

Yang Berbahagia Dato' Che Abdullah Mat Nawi DJMK JMK JP
- چئ عبدالله مت نوى
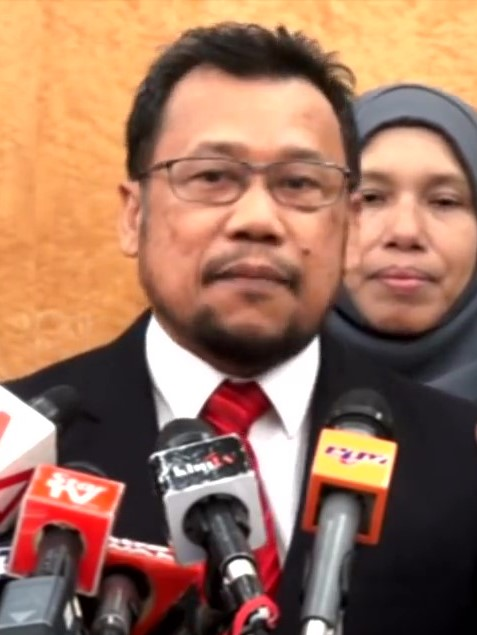
- Che Abdullah in 2018

Chairman of the Farmers' Organisation Authority
- In office 15 September 2021 – 24 November 2022
- Minister: Ronald Kiandee
- Preceded by: Nik Muhammad Zawawi Salleh
- Succeeded by: Mahfuz Omar

Deputy Minister of Agriculture and Food Industries II
- In office 10 March 2020 – 16 August 2021 Serving with Ahmad Hamzah (Deputy Minister of Agriculture and Food Industries I)
- Monarch: Abdullah
- Prime Minister: Muhyiddin Yassin
- Minister: Ronald Kiandee
- Preceded by: Sim Tze Tzin (Deputy Minister of Agriculture and Agro-based Industry)
- Succeeded by: Nik Muhammad Zawawi Salleh
- Constituency: Tumpat

Member of the Kelantan State Executive Council (Agriculture, Rural Industry & Biotechnology : 19 March 2008 – 6 May 2013 & Agriculture, Agro-based Industry, Biotechnology & Green Technology : 9 May 2013 – 10 May 2018) (Note: Assumed portfolios on 9 May 2013.)
- In office 6 May 2013 – 10 May 2018
- Monarch: Muhammad V
- Deputy: Abdul Azziz Kadir
- Menteri Besar: Ahmad Yakob
- Preceded by: Himself (Agriculture & Biotechnology); Portfolios established (Agro-based Industry & Green Technology)
- Succeeded by: Tuan Saripuddin Tuan Ismail
- Constituency: Wakaf Bharu
- In office 19 March 2008 – 6 May 2013
- Monarchs: Ismail Petra (2008–2010); Muhammad V (2010–2013)
- Deputy: Nik Mazian Nik Mohamad (2010–2013)
- Menteri Besar: Nik Abdul Aziz Nik Mat
- Succeeded by: Himself (Agriculture & Biotechnology); Portfolio abolished (Rural Industry)
- Constituency: Wakaf Bharu

Member of the Malaysian Parliament for Tumpat
- In office 9 May 2018 – 19 November 2022
- Preceded by: Kamarudin Jaffar (PR–PKR)
- Succeeded by: Mumtaz Md. Nawi (PN–PAS)
- Majority: 17,500 (2018)

Member of the Kelantan State Legislative Assembly for Wakaf Bharu
- In office 8 March 2008 – 9 May 2018
- Preceded by: Mohd Rosdi Ab Aziz (BN–UMNO)
- Succeeded by: Mohd Rusli Abdullah (GS–PAS)
- Majority: 660 (2008); 978 (2013)

Personal details
- Born: Che Abdullah bin Mat Nawi; 14 June 1960 (age 65) Pasir Mas, Kelantan, Federation of Malaya (now Malaysia)
- Citizenship: Malaysian
- Party: Malaysian Islamic Party (PAS) (—2022); United Malays National Organisation (UMNO) (since 2022)
- Other political affiliations: Pakatan Rakyat (PR) (2008—2015); Gagasan Sejahtera (GS) (2016—2020); Perikatan Nasional (PN) (2020—2022); Barisan Nasional (BN) (since 2022)
- Spouse: Saleha Yaacob
- Occupation: Politician

Che Abdullah bin Mat Nawi (Jawi: چئ عبدﷲ بن مت نوي) is a Malaysian politician who served as Chairman of the Farmers' Organisation Authority (FOA) from September 2021 to November 2022, Deputy Minister of Agriculture and Food Industries II in the Perikatan Nasional (PN) administration under former Prime Minister Muhyiddin Yassin and former Minister Ronald Kiandee from March 2020 to the collapse of the PN administration in August 2021, Member of Parliament (MP) for Tumpat from May 2018 to November 2022, Member of the Kelantan State Executive Council (EXCO) in the Pakatan Rakyat (PR) and Gagasan Sejahtera (GS) state administrations under Menteris Besar Nik Abdul Aziz Nik Mat and Ahmad Yakob as well as Member of the Kelantan State Legislative Assembly (MLA) for Wakaf Bharu from March 2008 to May 2018. He is a member of the United Malays National Organisation (UMNO), a component party of the Barisan Nasional (BN) coalition and was a member as well as State Secretary of Kelantan of the Malaysian Islamic Party (PAS), a component party of the PN and formerly GS and PR coalitions.

== Political career ==
Che Abdullah contested Wakaf Bharu assembly state in Wakaf Bharu in 2008 and re-elected in 2013 general election. He contested Tumpat parliamentary seat in 2018 and won that seat.

At the party level, he was the Secretary of the Kelantan PAS Liaison Agency. He was also the Chairman of the Agriculture, Agro-based Industry, Biotechnology and Green Technology of the State Government of Kelantan.

On 9 March 2020, Muhyiddin Yassin announced that Che Abdullah will be appointed as Deputy Minister of Agriculture and Food Industries and to be served along with Ahmad Hamzah from Barisan Nasional.

== Election results ==
Kelantan State Legislative Assembly
| Year | Constituency | Candidate | Votes | Pct | Opponent(s) | Votes | Pct | Ballots cast | Majority | Turnout |
|---|---|---|---|---|---|---|---|---|---|---|
| 2008 | N04 Wakaf Bharu | Che Abdullah Mat Nawi (PAS) | 8,405 | 52.04% | Mohd Rosdi Ab Aziz (UMNO) | 7,745 | 47.96% | 16,417 | 660 | 85.02% |
| 2013 | N04 Wakaf Bharu | Che Abdullah Mat Nawi (PAS) | 11,515 | 52.22% | Mohd Rosdi Ab Aziz (UMNO) | 10,537 | 47.78% | 22,369 | 978 | 87.70% |

Parliament of Malaysia
| Year | Constituency | Candidate | Votes | Pct | Opponent(s) | Votes | Pct | Ballots cast | Majority | Turnout |
|---|---|---|---|---|---|---|---|---|---|---|
| 2018 | P019 Tumpat | Che Abdullah Mat Nawi (PAS) | 47,041 | 54.33% | Wan Johani Wan Hussin (UMNO) | 29,541 | 34.12% | 88,733 | 17,500 | 79.99% |
| 2018 | P019 Tumpat | Che Abdullah Mat Nawi (PAS) | 47,041 | 54.33% | Nordin Salleh (BERSATU) | 10,003 | 11.55% | 88,733 | 17,500 | 79.99% |
| 2022 | P019 Tumpat | Che Abdullah Mat Nawi (UMNO) | 30,633 | 29.27% | Mumtaz Md. Nawi (PAS) | 65,426 | 62.51% | 106,131 | 34,793 | 70.07% |
| 2022 | P019 Tumpat | Che Abdullah Mat Nawi (UMNO) | 30,633 | 29.27% | Wan Ahmad Johari Wan Omar (AMANAH) | 7,762 | 7.42% | 106,131 | 34,793 | 70.07% |
| 2022 | P019 Tumpat | Che Abdullah Mat Nawi (UMNO) | 30,633 | 29.27% | Che Mohamad Aswari Che Ali (PUTRA) | 593 | 0.57% | 106,131 | 34,793 | 70.07% |
| 2022 | P019 Tumpat | Che Abdullah Mat Nawi (UMNO) | 30,633 | 29.27% | Khairul Azwan Kamarrudin (WARISAN) | 245 | 0.23% | 106,131 | 34,793 | 70.07% |

== Honours ==
- Kelantan
  - Knight Commander of the Order of the Life of the Crown of Kelantan (DJMK) – Dato' (2012)
  - Companion of the Order of the Life of the Crown of Kelantan (JMK) (2010)
  - Justice of Peace (JP) (2018)
