= Ikatan Masyarakat Islam Malaysia =

Islamic political party in Malaysia

Muslim Community Union of Malaysia Ikatan Masyarakat Islam Malaysia
- Abbreviation: IKATAN
- Leader: Abdul Wahab Yunus
- Founded: 28 February 1990
- Dissolved: 4 April 1999 (taken-over and rebranded to KeADILan)
- Split from: Parti Hizbul Muslimin Malaysia (HAMIM)
- Succeeded by: Parti Keadilan Nasional (KeADILan)
- Headquarters: Terengganu
- Ideology: Islamism; Social justice
- Religion: Sunni Islam

Party flag

Ikatan Masyarakat Islam Malaysia (Malay for "Muslim Community Union of Malaysia", abbreviated IKATAN) was a minor Islamic political party formed in 1991 and based in Terengganu.

IKATAN was a splinter party of Muslim People's Party of Malaysia (Malay: Parti Hizbul Muslimin Malaysia) (HAMIM), founded by Abdul Wahab Yunus, former Member of Parliament for Dungun, Terengganu who had resign from HAMIM together with his dissident supporters after losing the HAMIM presidential seat contest in 1990.

Initially the party with the headquarter in Kuala Lumpur had been tried to be registered with the acronym IMAM but was disapproved by Registrar of Societies (ROS) and finally the IKATAN acronym was used.

The constitution of IKATAN was amended to change the name of the party to the National Justice Party (Malay: Parti Keadilan Nasional) (KeADILan) and relaunched on 4 April 1999 during the Reformasi movement. It was subsequently renamed again as People's Justice Party (Malay: Parti Keadilan Rakyat) (PKR) after the merger with Malaysian People's Party (Malay: Parti Rakyat Malaysia) (PRM) on 3 August 2003.

== See also ==
- Parti Hizbul Muslimin Malaysia (HAMIM)
- National Justice Party (KeADILan) or People's Justice Party (PKR)
- List of political parties in Malaysia
- Politics of Malaysia
