= Kamarudin Jaffar =

Malaysian politician

Yang Berbahagia Dato' Kamarudin Jaffar DSNS
- قمرالدين بن جعفر
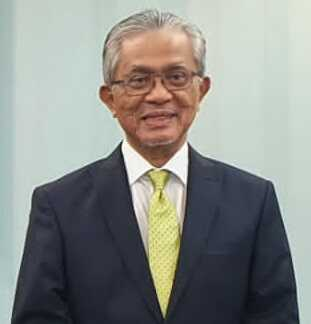
- Kamarudin Jaffar in 2022

Deputy Minister of Foreign Affairs
- In office 30 August 2021 – 24 November 2022
- Monarch: Abdullah
- Prime Minister: Ismail Sabri Yaakob
- Minister: Saifuddin Abdullah
- Preceded by: himself
- Succeeded by: Mohamad Alamin
- Constituency: Bandar Tun Razak
- In office 10 March 2020 – 16 August 2021
- Monarch: Abdullah
- Prime Minister: Muhyiddin Yassin
- Minister: Hishammuddin Hussein
- Preceded by: Marzuki Yahya
- Succeeded by: himself
- Constituency: Bandar Tun Razak

Deputy Minister of Transport
- In office 2 July 2018 – 24 February 2020
- Monarchs: Muhammad V Abdullah
- Prime Minister: Mahathir Mohamad
- Minister: Anthony Loke Siew Fook
- Preceded by: Ab Aziz Kaprawi
- Succeeded by: Hasbi Habibollah
- Constituency: Bandar Tun Razak

Member of the Malaysian Parliament for Bandar Tun Razak
- In office 9 May 2018 – 19 November 2022
- Preceded by: Khalid Ibrahim (PR–PKR)
- Succeeded by: Wan Azizah Wan Ismail (PH–PKR)
- Majority: 19,930 (2018)

Member of the Malaysian Parliament for Tumpat
- In office 29 November 1999 – 9 May 2018
- Preceded by: Wan Jamil Wan Mahmood (PAS)
- Succeeded by: Che Abdullah Mat Nawi (PAS)
- Majority: 10,442 (1999); 1,820 (2004); 9,377 (2008); 10,704 (2013)

Personal details
- Born: Kamarudin bin Jaffar; 3 November 1951 (age 74) Wakaf Bharu, Tumpat, Kelantan, Federation of Malaya (now Malaysia)
- Citizenship: Malaysian
- Party: United Malays National Organisation (UMNO) (–1999); Malaysian Islamic Party (PAS) (1999–2015); People's Justice Party (PKR) (2015–2020) (2026-present); Malaysian United Indigenous Party (BERSATU) (2020–2026)
- Other political affiliations: Barisan Nasional (BN) (–1999); Barisan Alternatif (BA) (1999–2004); Pakatan Rakyat (PR) (2008–2015); Pakatan Harapan (PH) (2015–2020) (2026-present); Perikatan Nasional (PN) (2020-2026)
- Spouse: Yushazlinda Yaacob
- Occupation: Politician
- Website: kjtumpat.blogspot.com

Kamarudin bin Jaffar (Jawi: قمرالدين بن جعفر; born 3 November 1951) is a Malaysian politician who served as the Deputy Minister of Foreign Affairs for the second term in the Barisan Nasional (BN) administration under former Prime Minister Ismail Sabri Yaakob and former Minister Saifuddin Abdullah from August 2021 to the collapse of the BN administration in November 2022 and the first term in the Perikatan Nasional (PN) administration under former Prime Minister Muhyiddin Yassin and former Minister Hishammudin Hussein from March 2020 to the collapse of the PN administration in August 2021, Member of Parliament (MP) for Bandar Tun Razak from May 2018 to November 2022, Deputy Minister of Transport in the Pakatan Harapan (PH) administration under former Prime Minister Mahathir Mohamad and former Minister Anthony Loke Siew Fook from July 2018 to the collapse of the PH administration in February 2020 and MP for Tumpat from November 1999 to May 2018. He is a member of the Malaysian United Indigenous Party (BERSATU), a component party of the PN coalition and was a member of the People's Justice Party (PKR), a component party of the PH coalition, Malaysian Islamic Party (PAS), a former component party of the Pakatan Rakyat (PR) and Barisan Alternatif (BA) coalitions and United Malays National Organisation (UMNO), a component party of the Barisan Nasional (BN) coalition.

Earlier Kamarudin was a member of United Malays National Organisation (UMNO), a major component in Barisan Nasional (BN) coalition before switching to PAS in 1999. While a member of UMNO, he was considered a close associate of then Deputy Prime Minister and later Opposition Leader Anwar Ibrahim, and was held in custody with Anwar under the Internal Security Act (ISA).

Kamarudin made his debut contesting but lost the Tumpat parliamentary constituency in 1995 general election when he was still in UMNO. Since switching to PAS, Kamarudin was elected to the Tumpat seat in the 1999, 2004, 2008 and 2013 elections. For the 2004 election, he was the PAS Secretary-General. He subsequently contested and won the Bandar Tun Razak constituency in the 2018 elections after joining PKR.

Kamarudin was sworn in as Deputy Minister of Transport from 2 July 2018 until 24 February 2020, which is part of Prime Minister Mahathir's 7th Cabinet.

== Biodata ==
Kamarudin bin Jaffar was born on 3 November 1951 at Wakaf Bharu, Tumpat, Kelantan. Attended SRK Sultan Ibrahim, Pasir Mas, Kelantan (1958–1963). At the Malay College Kuala Kangsar (1964–1970) he studied with Datuk Seri Anwar Ibrahim. He furthered his studies at University of Kent, Canterbury, England (1971–1974) later at the University of London (1975–1976).

== Family ==
His wife Kamariah Kamarudin died on 11 November 2009 from colon cancer after receiving treatment at the Subang Jaya Medical Center (SJMC) including chemotherapy. At that time, Kamaruddin Jaafar was in Qatar. The body was prayed at Nurul Yaqin Mosque, SS7 Kelana Jaya and was buried at Bukit Kiara after Asar prayers.

They have four children, two sons and two daughters:

1. Nur Adilah
2. Saiful Adli
3. Shahid Adli
4. Nur Shifa

Kamaruddin Jaafar married for the second time with Datin Yushazlinda Yaacob on 10 March 2011. The wedding ceremony was held at Tengku Kelana Jaya Mosque Petra, Kelana Jaya, Selangor. His wife is from Melaka. Also present were Mahfuz Omar, Dr Dzulkefly Ahmad and Dr Mohd Hatta Ramli.

== Career ==
- Assistant Secretary, Research Division, Prime Minister's Department (1974–1975)
- Lecturer, National University of Malaysia (1975–1985)
- Political Secretary to Deputy Prime Minister, Tun Ghafar Baba (1986–1991)

== Politics ==
- Malaysian UMNO Youth Exco
- Kelantan UMNO Youth chief
- Tumpat Umno Division chief 1998
- Secretary of the Angkatan Belia Islam Malaysia (ABIM) Session 1983-1987
- PAS Secretary General Session 2005-2007 and 2007-2009 session
- Member of the Central Committee of PAS Session 2003-2005
- PAS Liaison Committee 2003-2005
- Tumpat PAS District Treasurer (2003 until 2015)

== Joining UMNO ==
Kamaruddin Jaafar is seated with Datuk Seri Anwar Ibrahim when advancing the Angkatan Belia Islam Malaysia and Yayasan Anda Akademik in the Valley of the Coast near the University of Malaya.

While Anwar Ibrahim joined UMNO and became the Minister and Deputy Prime Minister of Malaysia, he was among the main leaders of ABIM who put their trust in UMNO with the intention of giving UMNO a deeper perspective. It was here that he was appointed chairman of the Institute of Policy Studies, a think tank founded by Datuk Seri Anwar Ibrahim. Other ABIM leaders joining UMNO were Kamaruddin, Anuar Tahir and Mohd Nor Monutty and many others surrounded Anwar Ibrahim. Anwar Ibrahim, surrounded by the people of ABIM, is disliked by the ranks of UMNO leaders such as Sanusi Junid. In 1995 he contested in Tumpat on BN/UMNO tickets but lost to a PAS candidate.

== ISA Detention ==
On 22 September 1998, he and 12 other leaders were detained under the Internal Security Act (ISA) Section 73(1)(A). The detainee was

1. Anwar Ibrahim, Deputy Prime Minister of Malaysia
2. Ruslan Kassim, Negeri Sembilan Umno Youth chief
3. Kamaruddin Mat Noor, Semarak state assemblyman
4. Ahmad Zahid Hamidi, UMNO Youth chief and Bagan Datoh MP
5. Ahmad Azam Abdul Rahman, President of ABIM
6. Mukhtar Redhuan, ABIM's Vice President
7. Shaharuddin Badaruddin, ABIM's Secretary-General
8. Abdul Halim Ismail, ABIM's Vice President
9. Kamarudin Jaffar, Chairman of the Institute for Policy Studies
10. Tamunif Mokhtar, Cheras UMNO Division Chief
11. Abdul Manan, President of the Islamic Student Association of Malaysia
12. Prof. Dr. Sidek Baba, UIAM

== Dismissed from UMNO and joined PAS ==
On 6 July 1999, the UMNO Supreme Council fired nine party members, including Tumpat Umno division chief Datuk Kamaruddin Jaafar, for involvement in assisting and joining opposition parties following the dismissal of his ABIM partner, Anwar Ibrahim. Deputy Prime Minister of Malaysia Abdullah Ahmad Badawi sent a show cause letter to them. Also dismissed were Ismail Yusof, Haji Said Othman, Tarmizi Ismail and Jumri Sabran from Umno Bukit Gantang. Abdullah Badawi (UMNO Johor Bahru), Senator Hamzah Mohd Zain (Chenderoh) and Saufi Daud and Mohamad Noor (UMNO Tumpat).

On 21 July 1999, he declared to join PAS Tumpat during a talk by PAS President and PAS Spiritual Leader Dato' Nik Abdul Aziz Nik Mat. To him, there is no room in UMNO to implement the political way of Islam.

== Joining PKR ==
On 11 September 2015, Kamaruddin with Tan Sri Muhammad Muhammad Taib has left PAS and joined PKR. During the internal upheavals of PAS in 2015, he was seen closely with PAS split-off group Gerakan Harapan Baru (GHB), which later formed the National Trust Party (AMANAH). Both figures say that their participation in PKR is aimed at strengthening the new coalition of the opposition and at the same time staying with AMANAH.

== Election results ==
Parliament of Malaysia
Year	Constituency	Candidate	Votes	Pct	Opponent(s)	Votes	Pct	Ballots cast	Majority	Turnout
1995	P019 Tumpat	Kamarudin Jaffar (UMNO)	15,764	45.62%	Wan Jamil Wan Mahmood (PAS)	17,682	51.17%	34,553	1,918	74.79%
1999	P019 Tumpat	Kamarudin Jaffar (PAS)	23,218	63.34%	Noor Zahidi Omar (UMNO)	12,776	34.85%	36,657	10,442	75.70%
2004	P019 Tumpat	Kamarudin Jaffar (PAS)	27,919	50.68%	Mat Nawawi Mat Jusoh (UMNO)	26,099	47.38%	55,090	1,820	77.80%
2008	P019 Tumpat	Kamarudin Jaffar (PAS)	36,714	56.26%	Asyraf Wajdi Dusuki (UMNO)	27,337	41.89%	65,254	9,377	81.49%
2013	P019 Tumpat	Kamarudin Jaffar (PAS)	46,141	55.62%	Mansor Salleh (UMNO)	35,527	42.82%	82,962	10,704	84.11%
2018	P124 Bandar Tun Razak	Kamarudin Jaffar (PKR)	41,126	57.78%	Adnan Seman (UMNO)	21,196	29.78%	71,180	19,930	85.10%
2018	P124 Bandar Tun Razak	Kamarudin Jaffar (PKR)	41,126	57.78%	Rosni Adam (PAS)	7,884	11.08%	71,180	19,930	85.10%
2022	P124 Bandar Tun Razak	Kamarudin Jaffar (BERSATU)	33,659	36.18%	Wan Azizah Wan Ismail (PKR)	43,476	46.74%	93,021	9,817	78.05%
2022	P124 Bandar Tun Razak	Kamarudin Jaffar (BERSATU)	33,659	36.18%	Chew Yin Keen (MCA)	15,886	17.08%	93,021	9,817	78.05%

== Honours ==
- Negeri Sembilan
  - Knight Companion of the Order of Loyalty to Negeri Sembilan (DSNS) – Dato' (1994)
