= Bandar Tun Razak (federal constituency) =

Malaysian federal constituency

Bandar Tun Razak (P124)
Kuala Lumpur constituency

Federal constituency
- Legislature: Dewan Rakyat
- MP: Wan Azizah Wan Ismail; PH
- Constituency created: 1994
- First contested: 1995
- Last contested: 2022

Demographics
- Population (2020): 191,318
- Electors (2022): 119,185
- Area (km²): 25
- Pop. density (per km²): 7,652.7

Bandar Tun Razak is a federal constituency in the Federal Territory of Kuala Lumpur, Malaysia, that has been represented in the Dewan Rakyat since 1995.

The federal constituency was created in the 1994 redistribution and is mandated to return a single member to the Dewan Rakyat under the first past the post voting system.

== Demographics ==
Ethnic breakdown of Bandar Tun Razak's electorate as of 2022
1. Malay (62.1%)
2. Chinese (26.9%)
3. Indian (8.73%)
4. Other ethnicities (2.31%)

As of 2020, Bandar Tun Razak has a population of 191,318 people.

Age breakdown of Bandar Tun Razak's electorate as of 2022
1. 18-20 (6.38%)
2. 21-29 (21.4%)
3. 30-39 (22.7%)
4. 40-49 (18.3%)
5. 50-59 (14.9%)
6. 60-69 (10.4%)
7. 70-79 (4.56%)
8. 80-89 (1.16%)
9. above 90 (0.14%)
Gender breakdown of Bandar Tun Razak's electorate as of 2022
1. Male (49.9%)
2. Female (50.1%)

According to the August 2022 Electoral Roll used for the 2022 Malaysian general election, the Bandar Tun Razak constituency has 119,185 registered voters, of whom 62.1% are Malay, 26.9% are Chinese, 8.73% are Indian, and 2.31% are from other ethnic groups. In the 2018 general election, the constituency had 83,650 registered voters. The 2022 general election saw an increase of 35,535 voters, a 42.48% increase. In terms of percentage of voters by ethnic group, the Malay population increased by 0.3%, the Chinese decreased by 2.2%, the Indian population increased by 0.46%, and the other ethnic groups increased by 1.19%.

Change of electorate in Bandar Tun Razak (by percentage)
Election	Electorate				Voters	Change
Election	Malay	Chinese	Indian	Other	Voters	Change
2022	62.1	26.9	8.73	2.31	119,185	+42.48%
2018	61.08	29.1	8.27	1.12	83,650	-8.07%
2013	53	37	9	2	90,993	+25.29%
2008	53	40	7	1	72,628	+7.72%
2004	51	40	8	1	67,421	+13.92%
1999					59,182	+10.24%
1995					53,687	－

== History ==
=== Polling districts ===
According to the gazette issued on 31 October 2022, the Bandar Tun Razak constituency has a total of 19 polling districts.

Polling District	Code	Location
Rumah Pangsa Sri Johor	124/00/01	SJK (C) Naam Kheung
Rumah Pangsa Sri Pulau Pinang	124/00/02	SRA Al-Ridhwan
Rumah Pangsa Sri Sabah	124/00/03	SK Sri Cheras
Taman Ikan Emas	124/00/04	SMK Teknik Kuala Lumpur
Rumah Pangsa Sri Melaka	124/00/05	SMK Cheras
Sri Permaisuri	124/00/06	SMK Seri Permaisuri
Bandar Sri Permaisuri	124/00/07	SK Seri Tasik
Rumah Pangsa Sri Labuan	124/00/08	SMK Bandar Tun Razak
Sri Kota	124/00/09	SK Seri Mulia
Taman Mulia	124/00/10	SM Sains Selangor
Bandar Tun Razak	124/00/11	SK Bandar Tun Razak 1; SK Bandar Tun Razak 2
Desa Tun Razak	124/00/12	SMK Bandar Tasik Selatan
Kampung Malaysia	124/00/13	SMK Desa Petaling
Bandar Tasik Selatan	124/00/14	SK Bandar Tasik Selatan; SK Desa Tasik
Pekan Sungai Besi	124/00/15	SMK Sungai Besi
Kem Tentera	124/00/16	SK Pengkalan Tentera Darat
Taman Len Seng	124/00/17	SK Alam Damai; SRA Al-Mukhlisin
Taman Bukit Cheras	124/00/18	SK Seri Anggerik
Taman Bukit Anggerik	124/00/19	SRA Al-Mubarakah

=== Representation history ===
Members of Parliament for Bandar Tun Razak
Parliament	No	Years	Member	Party	Vote Share
Constituency created from Sungai Besi
9th	P112	1995–1999	Tan Chai Ho (陈财和)	BN (MCA)	25,382; 68.11%
10th	P112	1999–2004	Tan Chai Ho (陈财和)	BN (MCA)	22,273; 51.41%
11th	P124	2004–2008	Tan Chai Ho (陈财和)	BN (MCA)	32,223; 67.91%
12th	P124	2008–2013	Abd Khalid Ibrahim (عبدالخالد إبراهيم)	PR (PKR)	28,123; 52.34%
13th	P124	2013–2014	Abd Khalid Ibrahim (عبدالخالد إبراهيم)	PR (PKR)	44,067; 57.02%
13th	P124	2014–2018	Abd Khalid Ibrahim (عبدالخالد إبراهيم)	Independent	44,067; 57.02%
14th	P124	2018–2020	Kamarudin Jaffar (قمرالدين بن جعفر)	PH (PKR)	41,126; 58.58%
14th	P124	2020–2022	Kamarudin Jaffar (قمرالدين بن جعفر)	PN (BERSATU)	41,126; 58.58%
15th	P124	2022–present	Wan Azizah Wan Ismail (وان عزيزة وان إسماعيل)	PH (PKR)	43,476; 46.74%

=== Historical boundaries ===
Federal constituency	Area		
Federal constituency	1994	2003	2018
Bandar Tun Razak	Alam Damai; Bandar Tun Razak; Bukit Jalil; Desa Petaling; Sungai Besi		Alam Damai; Bandar Sri Permaisuri; Bandar Tun Razak; Ikan Emas; Sungai Besi

=== Local governments & postcodes ===
No.	Local Government	Postcode
P124	Kuala Lumpur City Hall	56000, 57000, 57100 Kuala Lumpur

== Election results ==
Malaysian general election, 2022
Party	Candidate	Votes	%	∆%
PH	Wan Azizah Wan Ismail	43,476	46.74	▲46.74
PN	Kamarudin Jaffar	33,659	36.18	▲36.18
BN	Chew Yin Keen	15,886	17.08	▼13.11
Total valid votes		93,021	100.00	
Total rejected ballots		572		
Unreturned ballots		252		
Turnout		93,845	78.74	▼6.35
Registered electors		119,185		
Majority		9,817	10.56	▼17.83
PH hold		Swing		
Source(s) https://lom.agc.gov.my/ilims/upload/portal/akta/outputp/1753271/PUB%20613%20(2022)%20-%20PARLIMEN%20WP%20KUALA%20LUMPUR.pdf

Malaysian general election, 2018
Party	Candidate	Votes	%	∆%
PKR	Kamarudin Jaffar	41,126	58.58	▲1.56
BN	Adnan Seman @ Abdullah	21,196	30.19	▼11.52
PAS	Rosni Adam	7,884	11.23	▲11.23
Total valid votes		70,206	100.00	
Total rejected ballots		444		
Unreturned ballots		530		
Turnout		71,180	85.09	▼0.80
Registered electors		83,650		
Majority		19,930	28.39	▲13.08
PKR hold		Swing		
Source(s) "His Majesty's Government Gazette - Notice of Contested Election, Parliament for the Federal Territory of Kuala Lumpur [P.U. (B) 240/2018]" (PDF). Attorney General's Chambers of Malaysia. 3 May 2018. "Federal Government Gazette - Results of Contested Election and Statements of the Poll after the Official Addition of Votes, Parliamentary Constituencies for the Federal Territory of Kuala Lumpur [P.U. (B) 314/2018]" (PDF). Attorney General's Chambers of Malaysia. 28 May 2018.

Malaysian general election, 2013
Party	Candidate	Votes	%	∆%
PKR	Abd Khalid Ibrahim	44,067	57.02	▲4.68
BN	Tan Kok Eng	32,235	41.71	▼5.95
Independent	Mohamad Sukeri Abdul Samat	793	1.03	▲1.03
Independent	Mokhtar Salahudin	191	0.25	▲0.25
Total valid votes		77,286	100.00	
Total rejected ballots		861		
Unreturned ballots		10		
Turnout		78,157	85.89	▲10.17
Registered electors		90,993		
Majority		11,832	15.31	▲10.63
PKR hold		Swing		
Source(s) "Federal Government Gazette - Notice of Contested Election, Parliament for the Federal Territory of Kuala Lumpur [P.U. (B) 177/2013]" (PDF). Attorney General's Chambers of Malaysia. 26 April 2013. Archived from the original (PDF) on 2018-10-02. "Federal Government Gazette - Results of Contested Election and Statements of the Poll after the Official Addition of Votes, Parliamentary Constituencies for the Federal Territory of Kuala Lumpur [P.U. (B) 218/2013]" (PDF). Attorney General's Chambers of Malaysia. 22 May 2013. Archived from the original (PDF) on 2 October 2018.

Malaysian general election, 2008
Party	Candidate	Votes	%	∆%
PKR	Abd Khalid Ibrahim	28,123	52.34	▲20.25
BN	Tan Chai Ho	25,608	47.66	▼20.25
Total valid votes		53,731	100.00	
Total rejected ballots		557		
Unreturned ballots		707		
Turnout		54,995	75.72	▲1.34
Registered electors		72,628		
Majority		2,515	4.68	▼31.14
PKR gain from BN		Swing		?

Malaysian general election, 2004
Party	Candidate	Votes	%	∆%
BN	Tan Chai Ho	33,223	67.91	▲16.50
PKR	Rosli Ibrahim @ Mamat	15,696	32.09	▼16.50
Total valid votes		48,919	100.00	
Total rejected ballots		600		
Unreturned ballots		496		
Turnout		50,015	74.38	▼1.72
Registered electors		67,241		
Majority		17,527	35.82	▲33.00
BN hold		Swing		

Malaysian general election, 1999
Party	Candidate	Votes	%	∆%
BN	Tan Chai Ho	22,273	51.41	▼16.70
PKR	Chandra Muzaffar	21,049	48.59	▲48.59
Total valid votes		43,322	100.00	
Total rejected ballots		666		
Unreturned ballots		1,053		
Turnout		45,041	76.10	▲4.71
Registered electors		59,182		
Majority		1,224	2.82	▼36.72
BN hold		Swing		

Malaysian general election, 1995
Party	Candidate	Votes	%
BN	Tan Chai Ho	25,382	68.11
DAP	Lee Yee Lian	10,647	28.57
PAS	Abd. Malek Hussin	1,235	3.31
Total valid votes		37,264	100.00
Total rejected ballots		539	
Unreturned ballots		523	
Turnout		38,326	71.39
Registered electors		53,687	
Majority		14,735	39.54
This was a new constituency created.
