= Wakaf Bharu (state constituency) =

Constituency in Kelantan, Malaysia

Wakaf Bharu (N04)
Kelantan constituency

State constituency
- Legislature: Kelantan State Legislative Assembly
MLA
Mohd Rusli Abdullah
PN
- Constituency created: 1974
- First contested: 1974
- Last contested: 2023

Demographics
- Electors (2023): 36,439

Wakaf Bharu is a state constituency in Kelantan, Malaysia, that has been represented in the Kelantan State Legislative Assembly.

The state constituency was first contested in 1974 and is mandated to return a single Assemblyman to the Kelantan State Legislative Assembly under the first-past-the-post voting system.

== Demographics ==
As of 2020, Wakaf Bharu has a population of 45,229 people.

Ethnic breakdown of Wakaf Bharu's electorate as of 2023
1. Malay (86.8%)
2. Chinese (9.50%)
3. Other ethnicities (3.64%)
4. Indian (0.09%)

== History ==
=== Polling districts ===
According to the Gazette issued on 30 March 2018, the Wakaf Bharu constituency has a total of 14 polling districts.

State Constituency	Polling Districts	Code	Location
Wakaf Bharu (N04)	Kampung Pasir Puteh	019/04/01	SMK Chabang Empat
Wakaf Bharu (N04)	Cherang Melintang	019/04/02	SK Teluk Jering
Wakaf Bharu (N04)	Kampung Tok Oh	019/04/03	SK Padang Mandol
Wakaf Bharu (N04)	Kampung Periok	019/04/04	SMU (A) Tarbiah Islamiah
Wakaf Bharu (N04)	Bunut Sarang Burong	019/04/05	SMU (A) Tarbiah Diniah Tahfiz
Wakaf Bharu (N04)	Kebakat	019/04/06	SK Kebakat Jaya
Wakaf Bharu (N04)	Chenderong Batu	019/04/07	SK Chenderong Batu
Wakaf Bharu (N04)	Kampung Kubang Batang	019/04/08	SK Kubang Batang
Wakaf Bharu (N04)	Chabang Empat	019/04/09	SMK Chabang Empat
Wakaf Bharu (N04)	Kampung Jal Besar	019/04/10	SK Chabang Empat
Wakaf Bharu (N04)	Jal Kechil	019/04/11	SK Padang Mandol
Wakaf Bharu (N04)	Wakaf Delima	019/04/12	SK Kampong Delima
Wakaf Bharu (N04)	Kampung Belukar	019/04/13	SK Seri Wakaf Baharu
Wakaf Bharu (N04)	Wakaf Bharu Kedai	019/04/14	SK Wakaf Bharu

=== Representation history ===
Members of the Legislative Assembly for Wakaf Bharu
Assembly	No	Years	Member	Party
Constituency created from Tumpat Timor
4th	N03	1974–1978	Omar Awang Kechik	BN (UMNO)
5th	N03	1978–1982	Omar Awang Kechik	BN (UMNO)
6th	N03	1982–1986	Omar Awang Kechik	BN (UMNO)
7th	N03	1986–1990	Hussin Mahmood	BN (UMNO)
8th	N03	1990–1995	Ramli Abu Bakar	PAS
Constituency abolished to Pasir Pekan
Constituency re-created from Pasir Pekan
11th	N04	2004–2008	Mohd Rosdi Ab Aziz	BN (UMNO)
12th	N04	2008–2013	Che Abdullah Mat Nawi	PR (PAS)
13th	N04	2013–2018	Che Abdullah Mat Nawi	PR (PAS)
14th	N04	2018–2020	Mohd Rusli Abdullah	PAS
14th	N04	2020–2023	Mohd Rusli Abdullah	PN (PAS)
15th	N04	2023–present	Mohd Rusli Abdullah	PN (PAS)

== Election results ==
Kelantan state election, 2023
Party	Candidate	Votes	%	∆%
PAS	Mohd Rusli Abdullah	15,522	67.73	▲21.36
BN	Abdul Mannan Md Said	7,395	32.27	▼12.35
Total valid votes		22,917	100.00	
Total rejected ballots		194		
Unreturned ballots		38		
Turnout		23,149	63.53	▼20.43
Registered electors		36,439		
Majority		8,127	35.46	▲33.72
PAS hold		Swing		

Kelantan state election, 2018
Party	Candidate	Votes	%	∆%
PAS	Mohd Rusli Abdullah	10,287	46.37	▼5.85
BN	Mohd Rosdi Ab Aziz	9,900	44.62	▼3.16
PKR	Md Khir Zahri Ab Ghani	1,999	9.01	▲9.01
Total valid votes		22,186	100.00	
Total rejected ballots		297		
Unreturned ballots		149		
Turnout		22,632	83.96	▼3.74
Registered electors		26,956		
Majority		387	1.74	▼2.70
PAS hold		Swing		

Kelantan state election, 2013
Party	Candidate	Votes	%	∆%
PAS	Che Abdullah Mat Nawi	11,515	52.22	▲0.18
BN	Mohd Noor Yaacob	10,537	47.78	▼0.18
Total valid votes		22,052	100.00	
Total rejected ballots		257		
Unreturned ballots		60		
Turnout		22,369	87.70	▲2.68
Registered electors		25,501		
Majority		978	4.44	▲0.36
PAS hold		Swing		

Kelantan state election, 2008
Party	Candidate	Votes	%	∆%
PAS	Che Abdullah Mat Nawi	8,405	52.04	▲7.38
BN	Mohd Rosdi Ab Aziz	7,745	47.96	▼7.38
Total valid votes		16,150	100.00	
Total rejected ballots		235		
Unreturned ballots		32		
Turnout		16,417	85.02	▲3.97
Registered electors		19,309		
Majority		660	4.08	▼6.60
PAS gain from BN		Swing		?

Kelantan state election, 2004
Party	Candidate	Votes	%	∆%
BN	Mohd Rosdi Ab Aziz	7,280	55.34	▲27.23
PAS	Ramli Abu Bakar	5,874	44.66	▼26.22
Total valid votes		13,154	100.00	
Total rejected ballots		185		
Unreturned ballots		0		
Turnout		13,339	81.05	▲3.42
Registered electors		16,458		
Majority		1,406	10.68	▼12.07
BN gain from PAS		Swing		?

Kelantan state election, 1990
Party	Candidate	Votes	%	∆%
PAS	Ramli Abu Bakar	9,985	70.88	▲22.29
BN	Hussin Mahmood	3,960	28.11	▼23.30
Independent	Jaffar Che Awang	143	1.01	▲1.01
Total valid votes		14,088	100.00	
Total rejected ballots		337		
Unreturned ballots		0		
Turnout		14,425	78.63	▲3.16
Registered electors		18,346		
Majority		6,025	42.77	▲39.95
PAS gain from BN		Swing		?

Kelantan state election, 1986
Party	Candidate	Votes	%	∆%
BN	Hussin Mahmood	6,146	51.41	▼4.64
PAS	Ramli Abu Bakar	5,810	48.59	▲4.64
Total valid votes		11,956	100.00	
Total rejected ballots		490		
Unreturned ballots		0		
Turnout		12,446	75.47	▼4.49
Registered electors		16,491		
Majority		336	2.82	▼9.27
BN hold		Swing		

Kelantan state election, 1982
Party	Candidate	Votes	%	∆%
BN	Omar Awang Kechik	6,326	56.05	▼10.47
PAS	Ramli Abu Bakar	4,961	43.95	▲10.47
Total valid votes		11,287	100.00	
Total rejected ballots		345		
Unreturned ballots		0		
Turnout		11,632	79.96	▲5.49
Registered electors		14,548		
Majority		1,365	12.09	▼20.94
BN hold		Swing		

Kelantan state election, 1978
Party	Candidate	Votes	%	∆%
BN	Omar Awang Kechik	5,811	66.52	▼3.03
PAS	Ismail Awang	2,925	33.48	▲33.48
Total valid votes		8,736	100.00	
Total rejected ballots		169		
Unreturned ballots		0		
Turnout		8,905	74.47	▲0.70
Registered electors		11,958		
Majority		2,886	33.04	▼6.07
BN hold		Swing		

Kelantan state election, 1974
Party	Candidate	Votes	%
BN	Omar Awang Kechik	5,761	69.55
Independent	Wan Idris	2,522	30.45
Total valid votes		8,283	100.00
Total rejected ballots		609	
Unreturned ballots		0	
Turnout		8,892	73.77
Registered electors		12,054	
Majority		3,239	39.10
This was a new constituency created.
