= Reformasi (Malaysia) =

Movement started in 1998 by Anwar Ibrahim

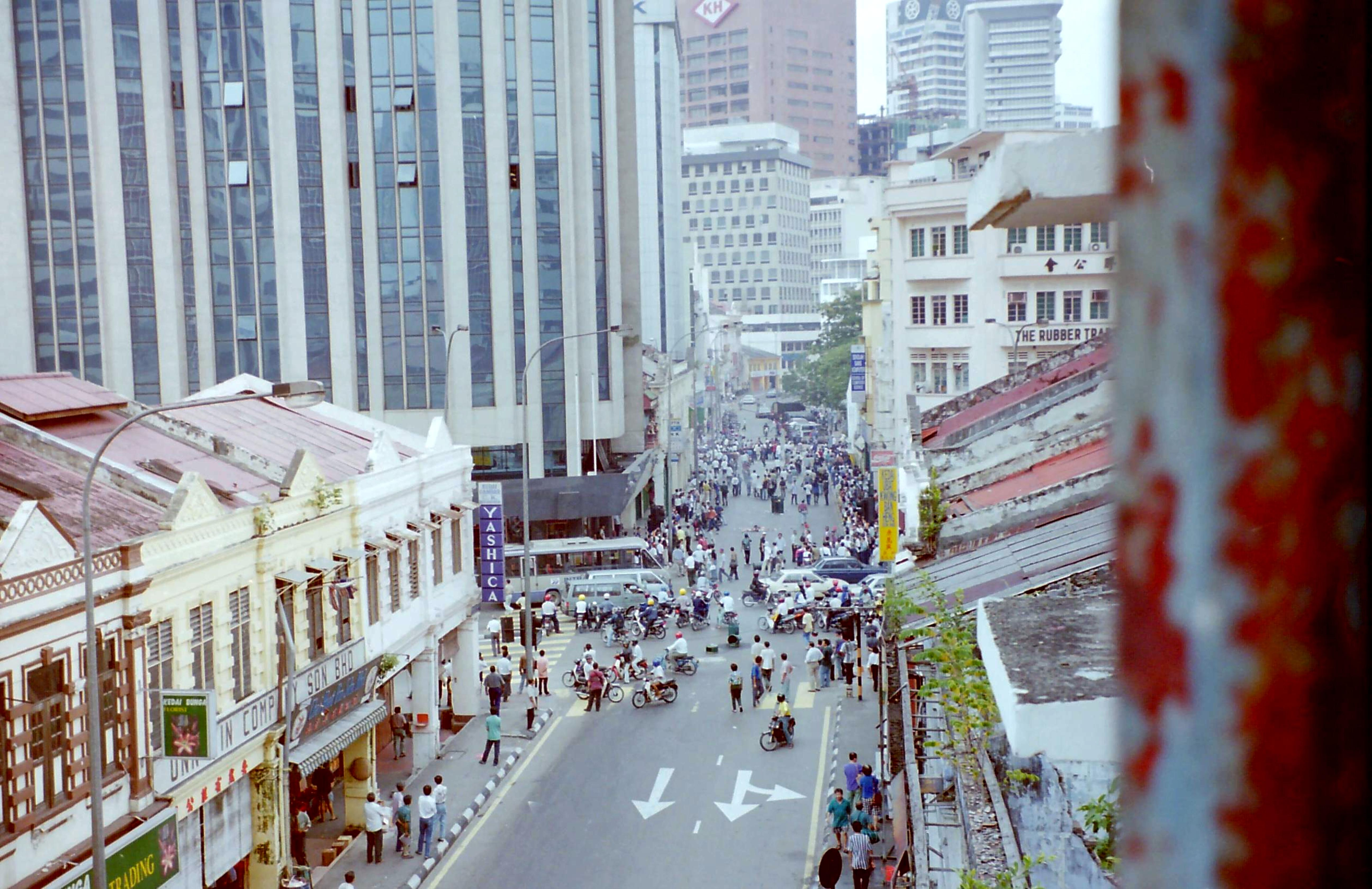
- Street protests in Kuala Lumpur after Anwar Ibrahim's sentencing, April 1999.
- Date: 2 September 1998 – 24 November 2022
- Location: Malaysia
- Caused by: Dissatisfaction with the federal government under the fifth Mahathir cabinet; Factionalism within the United Malays National Organisation since the 1970s; Other immediate causes
- Goals: Resignation of Prime Minister Mahathir Mohamad and ending his authoritarian rule; Anwar Ibrahim's assumption of the premiership; Increased civil liberties and participatory democracy; Reforms for social equality, social justice and meritocracy
- Methods: Civil disobedience; Demonstration; Sit-in; Rioting; Occupation; Online activism
- Result: Formation of Barisan Alternatif, Pakatan Rakyat and Pakatan Harapan; Anwar detained under Internal Security Act 1960 in 1998, subsequently jailed and released from prison in 2004; Anwar becomes Leader of the Opposition twice, between 2008 and 2015, and later from 2020 to 2022; Resignation of Mahathir Mohamad in 2003 and Abdullah Badawi in 2009; Electoral loses of Barisan Nasional in the 2008, 2013, 2018 and 2022 Malaysian general election; 2020–2022 Malaysian political crisis; Anwar Ibrahim sworn in as the Prime Minister of Malaysia on 24 November 2022

Parties
1998–2004: Alternative Front (BA): National Justice Party (KEADILAN, 1998–2003); Parti Rakyat Malaysia (PRM, 1998–2003); People's Justice Party (PKR, 2003–2004); Pan-Malaysian Islamic Party (PAS); Democratic Action Party (DAP, 1998–2001); Non-governmental organisations (NGOs): Social Justice Movement (ADIL); Angkatan Belia Islam Malaysia (ABIM); Suara Rakyat Malaysia (SUARAM); Malaysian Chinese Organizations' Election Appeals Committee (SUQIU)	1998–2003: National Front (BN): United Malays National Organisation (UMNO); Malaysian Chinese Association (MCA); Malaysian Indian Congress (MIC); Malaysian People's Movement Party (GERAKAN); Sarawak United People's Party (SUPP); Government of Malaysia: Royal Malaysian Police; Fifth Mahathir cabinet; Sixth Mahathir cabinet

Lead figures
Anwar Ibrahim	Mahathir Mohamad

Number
Several hundred thousands	

Reformasi refers to political movements in Malaysia that first emerged in September 1998. It was initiated by Anwar Ibrahim, then the Deputy Prime Minister of Malaysia, following his dismissal from office by Prime Minister Mahathir Mohamad. The movement began during the 1998 Commonwealth Games, which Malaysia was hosting, and initially called for Mahathir's resignation and an end to the Barisan Nasional (BN)'s dominance. Over time, Reformasi evolved into a broader reformist movement advocating democracy, social equality and social justice in Malaysia. At the time, Mahathir had been in power since 1981, and his administration had been criticised for increasingly authoritarian tendencies, particularly following Operation Lalang in 1987. Reformasi activities included civil disobedience, demonstrations, sit-ins, rioting, occupations and online activism, among others.

Building upon the momentum of Reformasi, Anwar's wife, Wan Azizah Wan Ismail, established the Social Justice Movement (Malay: Pergerakan Keadilan Sosial, abbreviated as ADIL) in late 1998. Efforts to register ADIL as a political party were unsuccessful, leading members to merge with the Ikatan Masyarakat Islam Malaysia (IKATAN), a small Islamic political party based in Terengganu. This merger resulted in the creation of the Parti Keadilan Nasional (PKN) in 1999. Later that year, PKN joined forces with the Democratic Action Party (DAP), Parti Rakyat Malaysia (PRM) and the Malaysian Islamic Party (PAS) to form the Barisan Alternatif (BA), which contested the 1999 general election and the 2004 Malaysian general election. The BA aimed to provide a united opposition front against BN, though it faced challenges in maintaining cohesion due to ideological differences among its member parties.

In 2003, the PKN merged with the PRM to form the Parti Keadilan Rakyat (PKR), which later became a principal component of the Pakatan Rakyat (PR) that made significant electoral gains in the 2008 and 2013 general elections, reducing the BN's parliamentary dominance. After PR dissolved in 2015, PKR joined the newly formed Pakatan Harapan (PH), which won the 2018 Malaysian general election under the leadership of former prime minister Mahathir, an ironic twist given his past role in the events that sparked Reformasi, ending BN's uninterrupted hold on federal power since the 1955 general election. While Reformasi has achieved major political breakthroughs and reshaped Malaysia's electoral landscape, it remains an ongoing movement, with persistent political instability and shifting alliances highlighted by the revival of both old and new rivalries during the 2020–2022 Malaysian political crisis and beyond. Some analysts have suggested that the Reformasi reached its logical conclusion, despite the persistence of certain underlying issues, with Anwar's ascension to the premiership in 2022 and the policy directions of his administration.

== Name ==
"Reformasi" is a Malay and Indonesian word which is derived from the English word "reformation" or the Dutch word "reformatie". It was originally the slogan of a series of social reform movements after the Indonesian people overthrew the dictatorial President Suharto in May 1998. In September of the same year, after Anwar was dismissed from office in Malaysia, it became the slogan of the political reform movement of Anwar's supporters against the long-term rule of the Barisan Nasional. The local Tamil translation of "refomasi" is sense-for-sense translation சீர்திருத்தம் (pronounced:Cīrtiruttam).

=== "The Flame Don't Extinguish" ===
The term 烈火莫熄 (pinyin: Lièhuǒ mò xī; lit. 'the flame don't extinguish') is a phono-semantic matching (sound and meaning translation) of "Refomasi". The local Chinese media initially translated the slogan "Reformasi" as 改革 or "reform", and later changed it to "烈火莫熄", which became the Chinese name for this social movement.

It was previously unknown who coined the Chinese translation of "烈火莫熄". It was not until 11 March 2014 that Democratic Action Party (DAP) political speaker Hew Kuan Yao confirmed that the phrase "烈火莫熄" was his. Hew Kuan Yao said that on the eve of the Mid-Autumn Festival in 1998, when he was the political secretary of then opposition leader Lim Kit Siang, he received a group of executive members from the Chinese Language Society of the University Science Malaysia. They said they were going to the Central Market in Kuala Lumpur to participate in a Mid-Autumn Lantern Parade to support Anwar's reform movement. The students asked Hew Kuan Yao how to attract media attention, and he suggested writing the four words "烈火莫熄" on the small note on the lantern, believing that this translation would attract media attention.

On the evening of the Mid-Autumn Festival on October 5, 1998, about 200 Anwar supporters held lanterns with the words "烈火莫熄" written on them and marched peacefully in front of the Merdeka Square in Kuala Lumpur. This incident did attract media attention. The then Kuala Lumpur Police Chief was very dissatisfied with Anwar supporters using the Mid-Autumn Festival to hold a political march. The then Deputy Minister of Home Affairs, Ong Ka Ting, also condemned those who had the intention to destroy the traditional Chinese cultural festival. After the slogan on the lantern slips was published, the translation of "烈火莫熄" (pinyin: Lièhuǒ mò xī) was homophonic with the Malay word "reformasi", which also had the meaning of "fire of reform is not over yet". It was regarded as "a stroke of genius" to promote the reform movement. Since then, local Chinese media have begun to use "烈火莫熄" as the official translation of this political movement, and it is still used today.

== Stimuli for Reformism ==
As a result of the 1997 Asian financial crisis, the Malaysian ringgit lost 50% of its value, the Kuala Lumpur Stock Exchange (KLSE) was devalued, property markets buckled, bad loans surged, and the government struggled to find a solution to the crisis. The difficulty in doing so, particularly without recourse to the International Monetary Fund (IMF) – the then prime minister, Tun Dr. Mahathir forbade such an abnegation of sovereignty – which have led to debates on proper policy approaches and an increased awareness of the country's vulnerability to outside economic forces. Mahathir preferred more innovative measures to stabilize the currency and cushion the economy from further speculative measures. On the other hand, Anwar Ibrahim, the deputy prime minister and then-Minister of Finance advocated IMF-style, free-market-oriented corrective measures. The economy eventually began its recovery under measures instituted by Mahathir, but Anwar continued his opposition to Mahathir's measures which eventually culminated in his sacking from all ministerial positions and from the United Malay National Organization (UMNO), and eventual arrest and sentencing to six years' imprisonment for corruption and nine years imprisonment for sodomy.

The movement borrowed their idiom from the campaign in the neighboring country of Indonesia against President Suharto earlier that year, which protested against the thirty-some years of Suharto rule in pursuit of "Reformasi", which successfully ended with his resignation on 21 May. Before his arrest on 20 September, Anwar travelled across the country, giving huge crowds public lectures on justice, the prevalence of cronyism and corruption, the urgency for social safety nets and so on. These groups controlled an expansive grassroots network and were able to garner tens of thousands of mostly Malay youths to support Anwar's cause and his calls for Reformasi.

Opposition parties such as the Democratic Action Party (DAP) and Pan-Malaysian Islamic Party (PAS) also extended their support. After leading a huge rally in Kuala Lumpur on 20 September 1998, amid the Commonwealth Games and the United Kingdom's Queen Elizabeth II's visit to Kuala Lumpur, Anwar was finally arrested and detained under the Internal Security Act (ISA). A number of his followers were also held under the ISA, and hundreds of demonstrators were eventually charged with illegal assembly and related offences.

Demonstrations intensified by the surrounding actions against Anwar - his arrest at gunpoint, assault by the chief of police, widely publicized sexual allegations against him, and his highly controversial court cases. Thousands took to the streets in protest when Anwar was sentenced to six years in jail for corruption (abuse of power) in April 1999. Police repression was again harsh and 118 people were arrested. Police dispersed protesters with the use of tear gas, chemically laced water and bludgeons, and publicised photographs and lists in the mainstream press of people wanted for interrogation. Apart from direct confrontation in the streets, the government and the opposition maintained an acrimonious campaign against each other, in the mainstream and the alternative media respectively. The latter included the bilingual (English and Malay) PAS newspaper, Harakah, published twice a week, smaller weekly and monthly publications such as Eksklusif, Detik and Tamadun, and several sites on the Internet.

== The Anwar factor ==
In early September 1998, Anwar Ibrahim, who was the deputy prime minister, was unceremoniously removed from his positions in government and UMNO. He was fired for alleged sexual misconduct. Even before charges were laid, Mahathir explained in graphic detail – repeated in stunningly explicit lead articles and banner headlines in the press – that his deputy was guilty of adultery, sodomy, and was trying to cover up evidences of his trysts. However, Anwar was not immediately detained. For 18 days he toured the country, giving extremely well attended public lectures on justice, the purported evils of Mahathirism, the prevalence of cronyism and corruption, the needs for social safety nets and the urgency to reform. Anwar averred that he had been pressing for change from within, and stressed on his role in developing low-cost housing and people-friendly policies while in government. He was largely supported by Islamic NGOs and a wide array of other groups and organizations. Islamist Groups in particular command an immense grassroots network. They were able to rouse tens of thousands of mostly Malay youths to espouse Anwar's cause and his calls for Reformasi. Opposition parties, such as DAP and PAS, have also proclaimed their support.

After leading an enormous rally in Kuala Lumpur on 20 September 1998, Anwar was finally arrested, together with a number of his followers. In addition, hundreds of demonstrators were eventually charged with illegal assembly and related offenses. Anwar was initially held under the ISA before other charges were specified. Opposition to the ISA became a central issue to Reformasi movement. Nine days after his arrest, Anwar appeared in court with serious head and neck injuries. As the Royal Commission of Inquiry concluded in March 1999, Anwar had been beaten in the custody by Rahim Noor, the then Inspector General of Police (IGP) and was later found guilty of assault and jailed for two months in 2000. Anwar was eventually sentenced to six years' imprisonment for corruption in April 1999 and nine years' imprisonment for sodomy two months later by the Malaysia High Court. His trial and conviction were widely discredited by the international community. Amnesty International stated that the trial proceedings "exposed a pattern of political manipulation of key state institutions including the police, public prosecutor's office and the judiciary" and declared Anwar a prisoner of conscience, stating that he had been arrested in order to silence him as a political opponent.

Once Anwar had been detained, the Reformasi movement continued to develop, with "Justice for Anwar" remaining a potent rallying call. Before his arrest, Anwar had designated his wife, Wan Azizah Wan Ismail as the successor of the movement. Wan Azizah developed an enormous following, attracting thousands to her emotional but rather banal speeches. For a time, these followers held massive weekend street demonstrations, mostly in Kuala Lumpur but also occasionally in Penang and other cities, for "keadilan" (justice) and against Mahathir.

Reformasi protesters demanded protection for civil liberties and repeal of the ISA. They decried constraints on the media and the judiciary and lambasted what was called KNN (korupsi, kolusi dan nepotisme) (corruption, cronyism and nepotism). Others also called for Islamization as the solution to the perceived moral decay of the government and society. Shouts of Allahu Akhbar (God is great) and takbir (a call to praise God) peppered demonstrations, many of which took place around mosques and at prayer times. The demonstrations were met with increasingly harsh crackdowns by the police.

These street protests had largely tapered out by mid-November, but they resumed at key moments, such as the announcement and anniversaries of the verdicts on Anwar's cases.

== Reformasi's goals ==
The Reformasi movement linked a wide array of protesters who had divergent aims and concerns under a commodious if amorphous umbrella. Reformasi constituted a broad-based popular movement for social, political and economic change. It was represented by the Barisan Alternatif (BA) coalition a precursor to Pakatan Rakyat (PR), itself a precursor to the current ruling Pakatan Harapan (PH) government, and in civil society by conglomerations of NGOs, trade unions, and other activists cooperating across sectors and issue areas. The groundswell of opposition to Mahathir, to BN, and specific government laws and policies conveyed in opposition oriented media (especially on the internet) was also tied to the Reformasi movement.

The movement and its leaders were forced to specify precisely what they meant by "reform" and to articulate concrete, pragmatic objectives once the political crisis matured. Particularly since elections approached, the aims of Reformasi had to be somehow encapsulated in a broadly appealing electoral platform.

Over the course of events, the Reformasi movement attracted an unprecedented range of active and passive supporters. Most Malaysians seemed to agree that at least some degree of change is warranted. For instance, 85 percent of respondents to a mid-1999 survey agreed that Malaysia needed a reassessment in politics, economy and society.

Among the more comprehend documents detailing specific reforms were two that originated with Chinese activists: the "People Are The Boss" declaration and that of the Malaysian Chinese Organizations' Election Appeals Committee (also known as Suqiu), both of them promulgated in mid-August 1999. The online "People Are The Boss" campaign was started by an informal group of ethnic-Chinese journalists as a noncommunal citizens' awareness campaign.

The list of signatories included not only Chinese Malaysians but also a number of Malays and Indians. The project's "Declaration on the People's Awareness" explains that government is appointed by and empowered by the people; the people thus have the right and responsibility to monitor their "employees" and hold them accountable.

Suqiu proved more controversial. At the forefront was the Suqiu Committee, a lobbying and monitoring group composed of 13 national-level Chinese guilds and associations. In addition, over 2,000 Chinese organizations nationwide endorsed a list of 17 core demands that was drafted as a wishlist, submitted to all political parties, and accepted at least in principle by the BN's Malaysian Chinese Association (MCA), Malaysian People's Movement Party (Gerakan), Sarawak United People's Party (SUPP), and also the opposition Barisan Alternatif or Alternative Front (BA) coalition.

Some of the demands, such as those for promoting democracy, human rights, justice, women's rights, and national unity, are nonethnic. Others are considered communal, such as demanding for modernizing New Villages and encouraging more egalitarian multiculturalism.

The MCA presented the demands to the cabinet, but UMNO condemned them as inappropriately communal and threatening. Fiery debate on Suqiu extended well beyond the elections. UMNO swore that it would uphold the position of Malays, and UMNO Youth staged an aggressive demonstration outside the Selangor Chinese Assembly Hall in August 2000.

Others were more supportive of the initiative, particularly those from the BA and civil society, a cohort that included a multiracial array of students and youth organizations.

Suqiu's defenders urged that the debate not be rendered so racially incendiary, advising that affirmative action policies be made more need-based, pointing out that the constitution guarantees Malays a special position (kedudukan istimewa) and not special rights (hak istimewa), and asserting that Islam denies any racial group-specific privileges. Eventually, under intense pressure, Suqiu backed down in January 2001.

== International response ==
Anwar's arrest prompted commentators as diverse as Amnesty International, Indonesian President B.J. Habibie, George Soros and former U.S. Vice-President Al Gore who showed signs of disapproval at Malaysia's political and economic failures. At the 1998 APEC Summit in Kuala Lumpur, Al Gore, gave a speech supporting Anwar and the Reformasi movement in front of the Prime Minister of Malaysia and other Asia-Pacific premiers.

"Democracy confers a stamp of legitimacy that reforms must have in order to be effective." He went on: "And so, among nations suffering economic crises, we continue to hear calls for democracy, calls for reform, in many languages - People Power, Doi Moi, Reformasi. We hear them today - right here, right now - among the brave people of Malaysia."

In September 1998, Mahathir experienced his first international snub when the Islamic Society of North America (ISNA) withdrew its invitation to the Prime Minister to be a keynote speaker at one of its meetings. Mahathir's invitation by a group of pro-government students based at Cambridge University to a workshop in October also sparked a controversy when a rival group calling itself the Cambridge Coalition for a Free Malaysia reacted to the invitation by calling for a boycott of the planned event. The event was not cancelled, but Mahathir was met by protestors, mainly Malaysian students and members of the Cambridge University Amnesty International group.

== Domestic response ==
The Reformasi movement attracted a wide range of previously disparate groups. About 25 Malay non-governmental organizations like the Angkatan Belia Islam Malaysia or Islamic Youth Movement of Malaysia (ABIM) and the Malaysian Islamic Reform Society joined PAS in forming GERAK (Malaysian People's Movement for Justice).

Predominantly non-Malay non-governmental organisations such as Suara Rakyat Malaysia (SUARAM) (Malaysian People's Voice) joined the DAP and the small but venerable Malaysian People's Party in forming GAGASAN (Coalition for People's Democracy). Further, as anticipation mounted that elections would be called, some forty non-governmental organizations involved with GERAK and GAGASAN organised Pemantau (Malaysian Citizens' Election Watch).

As a political commentator, former deputy prime minister Musa Hitam remarked that "If the reformasi movement and demonstrations could be given any significance in terms of Malaysian politics ... it is more issue-based than racial. I'm fascinated." Musa commented that prior to Reformasi, "any demonstration of any nature in Kuala Lumpur or Penang would always turn racial. Even if they were against the government, they would burn the Chinese shops."

== Coalition Building for Reform ==
The Reformasi movement united an array of organizations from both civil society and political society. Among the groups involved were the political parties, advocacy-oriented NGOs, religious organizations, trade unions, and professional associations. These groups were joined by organized and unorganized students, individual activists and alternative media.

Groups motivated by different underlying philosophies and representing different constituencies have learned, through practice of advocacy in the face of an increasingly consolidated and strong regime, to trust and work with each other.

To agitate for Reformasi, two main coalitions were launched in September 1998: Gagasan Demokrasi Rakyat (Coalition for People's Democracy, Gagasan), and Majlis Gerakan Keadilan Rakyat Malaysia (Malaysian People's Movement for Justice, Gerak). The two coalitions included an overlapping range of organizations, including the DAP, PAS and PRM. Gerak, however, included more Islamist groups and maintained a more Islamist orientation than the NGO-led Gagasan. No real attempt was made to segregate political parties and NGOs in these bodies, although, both of their comparative advantages were acknowledged.

NGOs, in particular, are often concerned not to align themselves too closely with political parties. Under the circumstances, all involved seemed to realize that broad-based cooperation on common aims was the best strategy available. Both coalitions focused on human rights and good governance, including repeal of unjust laws, expunging corruption, press freedom, judicial independence and social justice, although Anwar and the ISA dominated Gerak's Agenda.

== Timelines ==
=== Key events ===
Year	Date	Event
1998	2 September	Mahathir sacked his heir apparent Anwar Ibrahim from the Fifth Mahathir cabinet
1998	3 September	Anwar was expelled from UMNO and Dr. Munawar Anees, Anwar's former speechwriter, and Sukma Darmawan Sasmita Atmadja, Anwar's adoptive brother, were arrested under suspicion of engaging in homosexual acts
1998	8 September	Anwar's Declaration of Reformasi
1998	20 September	Anwar's Arrest
1998	27–30 September	Activists closely linked to Anwar like Tian Chua, N.Gobalakrishnan, Mohd Ezam Mohd Nor, Mohamed Azmin Ali, Fairus Izuddin and Dr Badrul Amin Baharun were arrested
1998	29 September	Anwar appeared in court and pleaded innocent to charges of corruption and sodomy. A photo of Anwar with a black eye (incurred from a beating by then Inspector General of Police Rahim Noor) and one hand raised became a symbol of the political opposition in many reformasi posters
1999	4 April	Founding of the National Justice Party led by Anwar's wife, Wan Azizah Wan Ismail
1999	14 April	Anwar sentenced to six years in prison for corruption
2000	8 August	Anwar was sentenced to nine years in prison for sodomy and the sentences were to be served consecutively
2004	2 September	Federal Court overturned Anwar's sodomy conviction and Anwar was immediately released

== Immediate causes of Reformasi ==
=== Clash of leadership styles ===
Reformasi occurred due to the differing leadership styles between Mahathir and Anwar. Anwar claimed that he had significantly changed the government from within and stressed that his role in developing low-cost housing and other people-friendly policies while in government, caused him to become a focus for popular frustrations with the ruling party. Before entering UMNO, Anwar had been a student activist, then headed Angkatan Belia Islam Malaysia (ABIM) in the 1970s, making strident calls for Islamicisation and Malay-language education. Detained for two years under the ISA, Anwar was brought into Mahathir's government six years later, in 1982. Expelled from Mahathir's camp, Anwar was warmly reclaimed by ABIM and other Islamic NGOs.

Months before Anwar's arrest, Mahathir had been granting more responsibility for economic policy-making to Daim Zainuddin, a financial strongman, thus limiting Anwar's power. Mahathir accused Anwar for being a "puppet" of foreign powers and institutions such as the International Monetary Fund (IMF), out to re-colonize Malaysia and the arrest was partly due to Anwar's economic mismanagement. Mahathir claimed that Anwar and his supporters were guilty of corruption and cronyism and that he had led the country to the brink of economic disaster by following the wishes of the IMF. Anwar was a "liar and an agitator, detained for this in 1974, and now returning to his old ways. Above all else, disregarding court warnings on the issue."

Despite Mahathir's clear enmity against the IMF, Anwar stated that the government "have an excellent rapport with the IMF officials and that they did say that Malaysia did not need IMF's rescue". Despite Mahathir's use of state's funds to bail out several prominent conglomerates, Anwar defended his opposition to government's bailouts and lack of transparency.

=== Economic mismanagement of 1997 Asian financial crisis ===
During the 1997 Asian financial crisis, UMNO party leaders accused Mahathir of mismanaging the economic crisis. A concert of attacks followed, including a claim made by a Time magazine article that Mahathir has funnelled a $250 million loan to his son through political party connections. Overt attempts by some in the ruling elite to protect ailing beneficiaries and "clients" from the full thrust of market forces during the 1997 Asian financial crisis like the above largely contributed to the friction between Mahathir and Anwar, with the latter commonly believed to have been less willing to yield to the government's financial bail-outs of these cronies.

As more of the business conglomerates created by symbiotic relationships between government and business elites started to face financial ruin, political ramifications inevitably spread to the highest levels of the ruling United Malays National Organization (UMNO)/Barisan Nasional coalition. When Anwar continued to resist some of these attempts at rescuing politically linked businesses, he was politically neutralized by first being arrested and then charged with corruption and sexual misconduct.

== Underlying cause of Reformasi ==
The main reasons for Reformasi do not just revolve around the episodes of the sacking and arrest of Anwar Ibrahim in 1998. For many years, UMNO have had several contentions within its party ranks and Reformasi is often viewed as a manifestation of UMNO's factionalism.

=== UMNO factionalism since the 1970s ===
Reformasi took place from the overt split within the UMNO leadership in 1998. Malaysians have witnessed such splits prior to 1998. For many people the events that preceded 1998 might be just another reminder of what had happened about two decades ago: a struggle for power between elements of the governing elite over who will get to lead the nation and shape it.

The first crisis, which arose in 1975 during Tun Abdul Razak's term as prime minister, the communist card was used by some to persecute and intimidate rivals in the party. This early period pitted a group of "young Turks" including Mahathir in wanting to cause rapid social change against an "old guard" of disparate forces of feudal nationalists and individuals whose fortunes were tied to the institutional vestiges of the "old system". However, UMNO survived this crisis because the winning faction created a new role for itself as the guardians of Malay development through new social and economic affirmative action policies in the form of The New Economic Policy (NEP).

In 1987, UMNO split in half after Tengku Razaleigh Hamzah challenged Dr Mahathir for the leadership of UMNO, and failed by only 43 votes from the 1479 delegates. The result forced Tengku Razaleigh to leave UMNO and set up his own Semangat '46 party, which formed an electoral collaboration with PAS and the largely Chinese DAP to compete in the 1990 elections. After this attempt failed, Semangat members rejoined UMNO in 1996, including Tengku Razeleigh. Many expect the current opposition to meet a similar fate.

== Impact of Reformasi ==
To Funston, it was no doubt an event that has impacted the Malays greatly. The majority Malay community was strongly divided by these events, particularly in the Klang Valley and the northern states. The pro-Anwar group garnered huge support from Malay youths and Muslim groups. Tensions were most visible in urban areas, but in the villages individuals also began boycotting the shops and even mosques of opposing groups. This had happened before, particularly in the 1960s but what was revolutionary about it was that it was never on such a massive scale. Many government employees, particularly teachers and military personnel, supported the opposition. Government leaders warned these officers not to challenge the government, and threatened disciplinary action against them. Non-Malays were not as involved as the Malays, but participated through non-governmental organisations (NGOs), or the DAP. Their grassroots organisations issued several substantial memoranda, including the widely publicized "Suqiu" or the "Seventeen Points".

Meredith Weiss responds in the same light by noting that even though there are both Islamic-oriented NGOs (IONGOs) and secular issue-oriented NGOs, including human rights, women's rights and other advocacy organizations, who are active in the Reformasi movement, these collaborations between these sectors tend to remain at a rather superficial level. The underlying motivation for the IONGOs is religion and their emphasis is on moral accountability and often pro-Malay policies.

The other advocacy groups hinges on specific, non-ethnic issues, phrased usually in universal terms. In addition, the membership of IONGOs is almost exclusively Malay Muslim, with some degree of gender segregation, and most communications are in the Malay language. The advocacy groups are mostly Chinese and Indian in leadership and membership, are more gender-neutral and operate mostly in English. All support Keadilan (justice), but with varying rationales, so that when members of the different kinds of NGOs co-operate, it is often in their alternate roles as party or electoral coalition workers.

On the other hand, according to Weiss, the long-term impact of Reformasi could be significant. Current manifestations indicate a change in Malay political culture away from blind loyalty and clientelism and towards more critical engagement with political processes, the development of an opposition coalition with a chance of upsetting BN dominance and hence ushering in a more liberal form of parliamentary democracy, and a shift towards a multiracial collaboration in which communally defined issues are less significant. Meeting these goals demands that the majority of voters accept new, issue rather than race-oriented norms of political interaction, a process which could take quite a long time.

=== Before Mahathir's resignation ===
Reformasi led to the formation of a new multiracial-based party named Parti Keadilan Nasional (National Justice Party). In 1999, a general election was held. The new Parti Keadilan Nasional, Parti Islam Se-Malaysia, and Democratic Action Party formed a Barisan Alternatif (Alternative Front), in a combined initiative to replace the standing Barisan Nasional (BN) coalition government. For the first time in Malaysia's history, UMNO, a Malay-based party and the dominant party in the BN coalition, received less than half of the total vote of ethnic Malays.

=== From Social Movement to Campaign Trail ===
What most distinguished the pro-justice agitation of Malaysia in the late 1990s from the prototypical mobilization of civil society-based pressure groups or prior coalition-building ventures of Malaysian political parties was the depth of the interaction between political parties.

Reformasi was never merely confined to NGOs and other nonpartisan organizations. Opposition political parties were energetically engaged from the outset, first individually and then in such coalitions as Gagasan and Gerak.

As elections drew near, the fulcrum of the movement shifted from nongovernmental to electoral sphere. Reformasi's transition from social movement to electoral campaign began with the NGO Adil, which was superseded as of April 1999 by the political party Keadilan.

The launch of Keadilan puts to rest months of speculation about whether Wan Azizah and Anwar would merely remain in Adil, join PAS, or try to stage a coup against UMNO. Although Keadilan was multiracial, its primary target was middle-class, middle of the road Malays, particularly from UMNO.

In June 1999, PAS, Keadilan, DAP and Parti Rakyat Malaysia(PRM) announced their plans to contest as Barisan Alternatif(BA). BA was endorsed by parties in Sabah and Sarawak and by the unregistered Parti Sosialis Malaysia(PSM).

The principal opposition leaders formulated a list of the ten common issues in June 1999: constitutional monarchy, parliamentary democracy, human rights, rules of law, independence of the judiciary, citizens' rights and responsibilities, Islam as official religion and freedom of religion, Malay as National language while retaining the rights for other languages, Bumiputera special position and Federalism. Many of the same people were involved at all stages of the movement, regardless of their affiliation, be it established political party or civil society.

These activists came both from advocacy groups, such as Aliran, Suaram, All Women's Action Society(AWAM), and from mass Islamic organizations, such as ABIM and JIM.

=== 1999 Malaysian general election ===
On 2 July 1999, before the elections, four opposition parties, PAS, DAP, Keadilan and the socialist, mainly Malay, Parti Rakyat Malaysia (PRM) declared a common programme of action emphasising on the ten principles drawn from the Malaysian constitution. These stressed constitutional principles based on democracy and the special position of Malays, the latter to reassure Malays that co-operation with the DAP would not involve prioritising DAP's interests. References to establish an Islamic state were not made because PAS agreed to drop this in the interests of opposition unity.

The coordination among the opposition parties have made the 1999 elections one of the most contested ever. For the first time, the ruling Barisan Nasional (BN) faced a coalition of the major opposition parties, campaigning on a common 'reform' platform. Even though BN won with 148 out of 193 seats, the elections still proved a major defeat for UMNO which lost 22 seats. Its parliamentary seats declined from 94 to 72. For the first time ever, UMNO seats were less than the total of its coalition partners. 4 of its ministers and 5 deputy ministers were defeated. One of the major reasons was the Malays' reaction against the government's handling of the Anwar issue. They shifted their support to the opposition.

Parti Islam SeMalaysia (PAS) and Keadilan (led by Anwar's wife) were the main beneficiaries. PAS, advantaging from its affiliation to reformasi, emerged as the new parliamentary opposition leader, and headed state governments in Kelantan and Terengganu.

=== During the leadership of Abdullah Badawi ===
By the time Abdullah Badawi took over in October 2003, the excitement generated by the formation of the Barisan Alternatif and its performance in the November 1999 election had started to fade. Since the DAP left the coalition in September 2001, Keadilan itself has been experiencing an acrimonious internal power struggle and looks in danger of going down the Semangat '46 path. The root of the BA's dilemma was evidently that its component parties could not reconcile their different agendas. On matters concerning Ketuanan Melayu and ethnic quotas, the DAP could not see eye to eye with PAS, Keadilan, and the PRM. With regard to PAS and its overriding focus on the creation of an Islamic state, it has opened a chasm that the two parties, the DAP and PAS, could not reconcile.

=== 2004 Malaysian general election ===
The opposition fall-out changed the fortunes for BN in the 2004 election. For instance, Parti Keadilan Nasional lost all of its seats in Parliament but one, which was held by its president, Wan Azizah, wife of Anwar Ibrahim. The BN coalition captured 198 out of 219 seats in Parliament on the way to its most convincing electoral performance since 1974. The Barisan Nasional performance in Northern Malaysia was particularly impressive. The Barisan Nasional's sweeping victory was also attributed to high expectations of the new Prime Minister Abdullah Badawi, who succeeded Mahathir in 2003.

Also, during the 2004 elections, the role of civil society slid quietly to the peripheries of Malaysian politics, marginalized once again by the state as well as by other political interests that intended to focus the epic struggle between UMNO and PAS as the centerpiece of the elections. Indeed, civil society movements, so proactive and politicised just five years ago with the growth of the Reformasi movement, were conspicuously absent in 2004 due to the lack of functioning space and state domination over society.

=== Release of Anwar in 2004 ===
However, Anwar Ibrahim was released from prison in September 2004 and Parti Keadilan Nasional re-emerged as Parti Keadilan Rakyat (PKR) or People's Justice Party. Even though Anwar was barred from participating in politics, he managed to become PKR's de facto leader. William Case says that both the "Anwar factor" and the PKR's multi-racial platform injected excitement in Malaysia's political life. In May 2007, Anwar stated that his purpose was to actively reinstate the multi-racial political coalition of PKR, DAP and PAS. His influence caused PAS to open its membership to non-Muslims in 2006 and Anwar's call to end the thirty-six-year-old New Economic Policy caught the attention and support of the non-Malays.

=== 2008 Malaysian general election ===
The excitement that Anwar caused in Malaysian politics reinvigorated the spirit of the Reformasi movement. It returned during Malaysia's 2008 general election, and contributed to the People's Justice Party's (PKR) win of 31 parliamentary seats. In addition, five of the eleven state governments in the peninsular Malaysia fell to the PKR, PAS, and DAP coalition. The success of the coalition caused the Barisan Nasional government to lose its two-thirds majority in parliament which it had held since 1969.

According to O'Shannassy, the elections of 2008 represent a significant change as the opposition gains could be seen as a robust public endorsement of their multiracial aspirations.

== In popular culture ==
=== Film ===
- Malaysian Gods (2009)
- Anwar: The Untold Story (2023)

== See also ==
- Reformasi (Indonesia)
- Anwar Ibrahim sodomy trials
