= List of candidates in the 2022 Malaysian general election =

This is the official list of candidates for the 2022 Malaysian general election, which was published on 5 November 2022 by the Election Commission of Malaysia (SPR).

This election saw a record 945 candidates contesting in all 222 parliamentary seats nationwide, among them a record 108 independent candidates.

== Western Malaysia ==
State	No.	Constituency	Number of voters	Ethnic Majority (as of 2022)	Incumbent Member of Parliament	Incumbent Coalition (Party)	Political coalitions and respective candidates and parties															
State	No.	Constituency	Number of voters	Ethnic Majority (as of 2022)	Incumbent Member of Parliament	Incumbent Coalition (Party)	Barisan Nasional		Pakatan Harapan + MUDA		Perikatan Nasional		Gerakan Tanah Air (informal coalition)		Other parties/Independents							
State	No.	Constituency	Number of voters	Ethnic Majority (as of 2022)	Incumbent Member of Parliament	Incumbent Coalition (Party)	Candidate name	Party	Candidate name	Party	Candidate name	Party	Candidate name	Party	Candidate name	Party	Candidate name	Party	Candidate name	Party	Candidate name	Party
Perlis	P001	Padang Besar	60,192	Malay/Muslim	Zahidi Zainul Abidin	BN (UMNO)	Zahida Zarik Khan	UMNO	Mohamad Saad @ Yahaya	AMANAH	Rusydan Rusmi	PAS			Ko Chu Liang	WARISAN	Zahidi Zainul Abidin	IND				
Perlis	P002	Kangar	74,859	Malay/Muslim	Noor Amin Ahmad	PH (PKR)	Fathul Bari Mat Jahya	UMNO	Noor Amin Ahmad	PKR	Zakri Hassan	BERSATU	Nur Sulaiman Zolkapli	PEJUANG	Rohimi Shapiee	WARISAN						
Perlis	P003	Arau	60,876	Malay/Muslim	Shahidan Kassim	BN (UMNO)	Rozabil Abd Rahman	UMNO	Fathin Amelina Fazlie	PKR	Shahidan Kassim	PAS										
Kedah	P004	Langkawi	66,777	Malay/Muslim	Mahathir Mohamad	GTA (PEJUANG)	Armishah Siraj	UMNO	Zabidi Yahya	AMANAH	Mohd Suhaimi Abdullah	BERSATU	Mahathir Mohamad	PEJUANG	Abd Kadir Sainuddin	IND						
Kedah	P005	Jerlun	67,601	Malay/Muslim	Mukhriz Mahathir	GTA (PEJUANG)	Othman Aziz	UMNO	Mohamed Fadzil Mohd Ali	PKR	Abdul Ghani Ahmad	PAS	Mukhriz Mahathir	PEJUANG								
Kedah	P006	Kubang Pasu	108,217	Malay/Muslim	Amiruddin Hamzah	GTA (PEJUANG)	Hasmuni Hassan	UMNO	Mohd Aizuddin Ariffin	PKR	Ku Abdul Rahman Ku Ismail	BERSATU	Amiruddin Hamzah	PEJUANG								
Kedah	P007	Padang Terap	59,806	Malay/Muslim	Mahdzir Khalid	BN (UMNO)	Mahdzir Khalid	UMNO	Muaz Abdullah	AMANAH	Nurul Amin Hamid	PAS	Razali Lebai Salleh	PEJUANG								
Kedah	P008	Pokok Sena	114,838	Malay/Muslim	Mahfuz Omar	PH (AMANAH)	Noran Zamini Jamaluddin	UMNO	Mahfuz Omar	AMANAH	Ahmad Saad @ Yahaya	PAS			Noraini Md Salleh	WARISAN						
Kedah	P009	Alor Setar	105,994	Malay/Muslim	Chan Ming Kai	PH (PKR)	Tan Chee Hiong	MCA	Simon Ooi Tze Min	PKR	Afnan Hamimi Taib Azamudden	PAS	Mohamad Nuhairi Rahmat	PEJUANG	Fadzli Hanafi	WARISAN	Nordin Yunus	IND	Sofan Feroza Md Yusup	IND		
Kedah	P010	Kuala Kedah	132,500	Malay/Muslim	Azman Ismail	PH (PKR)	Mashitah Ibrahim	UMNO	Azman Ismail	PKR	Ahmad Fakhruddin Fakhrurazi	PAS	Ulya Aqamah Husamudin	PEJUANG	Syed Araniri Syed Ahmad	WARISAN						
Kedah	P011	Pendang	94,547	Malay/Muslim	Awang Hashim	PN (PAS)	Suraya Yaacob	UMNO	Zulkifly Mohamad	PKR	Awang Hashim	PAS	Abdul Rashid Yob	GB								
Kedah	P012	Jerai	105,001	Malay/Muslim	Sabri Azit	PN (PAS)	Jamil Khir Baharom	UMNO	Zulhazmi Shariff	DAP	Sabri Azit	PAS	Mohd Nizam Mahshar	GB								
Kedah	P013	Sik	63,126	Malay/Muslim	Ahmad Tarmizi Sulaiman	PN (PAS)	Maizatul Akmam Othman @ Ibrahim	UMNO	Latifah Mohammad Yatim	AMANAH	Ahmad Tarmizi Sulaiman	PAS										
Kedah	P014	Merbok	132,444	Malay/Muslim	Nor Azrina Surip	PH (PKR)	Shaiful Hazizy Zainol Abidin	UMNO	Nor Azrina Surip	PKR	Mohd Nazri Abu Hassan	BERSATU	Mohamed Mohsin Abdul Razak	IMAN	Khairul Anuar Ahmad	WARISAN						
Kedah	P015	Sungai Petani	168,847	Malay/Muslim	Johari Abdul	PH (PKR)	Shahanim Mohamad Yusoff	UMNO	Mohammed Taufiq Johari	PKR	Robert Ling Kui Ee	BERSATU	Marzuki Yahya	PEJUANG	Tan Joon Long @ Tan Chow Kang	PRM						
Kedah	P016	Baling	132,099	Malay/Muslim	Abdul Azeez Abdul Rahim	BN (UMNO)	Abdul Azeez Abdul Rahim	UMNO	Johari Abdullah	AMANAH	Hassan Saad	PAS	Bashir Abdul Rahman	PUTRA								
Kedah	P017	Padang Serai	133,867	Malay/Muslim	Karupaiya Mutusami (died)	PH (PKR)	Sivarraajh Chandran	MIC	Mohamad Sofee Razak	PKR	Azman Nasrudin	BERSATU	Hamzah Abdul Rahman	PUTRA	Mohd Bakri Hashim	WARISAN	Ananda Ak	IND				
Kedah	P018	Kulim-Bandar Baharu	90,141	Malay/Muslim	Saifuddin Nasution Ismail	PH (PKR)	Muhar Hussain	UMNO	Saifuddin Nasution Ismail	PKR	Roslan Hashim	BERSATU	Mohamad Yusrizal Yusoff	GB								
Kelantan	P019	Tumpat	149,371	Malay/Muslim	Che Abdullah Mat Nawi	PN (PAS)	Che Abdullah Mat Nawi	BN	Wan Ahmad Johari Wan Omar	AMANAH	Mumtaz Md. Nawi	PAS	Che Mohamad Aswari Che Ali	PUTRA	Khairul Azuan Kamarrudin	WARISAN						
Kelantan	P020	Pengkalan Chepa	106,982	Malay/Muslim	Ahmad Marzuk Shaary	PN (PAS)	Mohd Hafiezulniezam Mohd Hasdin	UMNO	Nik Faizah Nik Othman	AMANAH	Ahmad Marzuk Shaary	PAS	Wan Ahmad Nasri Wan Ismail	PEJUANG	Mohamad Redzuan Razali	IND						
Kelantan	P021	Kota Bharu	115,450	Malay/Muslim	Takiyuddin Hassan	PN (PAS)	Rosmadi Ismail	UMNO	Hafidzah Mustakim	AMANAH	Takiyuddin Hassan	PAS	Che Musa Che Omar	PUTRA	Andy Tan @ Awang	PRM	Izat Bukhary	IND				
Kelantan	P022	Pasir Mas	94,544	Malay/Muslim	Ahmad Fadhli Shaari	PN (PAS)	Abdul Ghani Harun	UMNO	Husam Musa	PKR	Ahmad Fadhli Shaari	PAS	Nasrul Ali Hassan Abdul Latif	PUTRA								
Kelantan	P023	Rantau Panjang	93,248	Malay/Muslim	Siti Zailah Mohd Yusoff	PN (PAS)	Zulkarnain Yusoff	UMNO	Wan Shah Jihan Wan Din	AMANAH	Siti Zailah Mohd Yusoff	PAS	Ibrahim Ali	PUTRA	Mohd Zain Ismail	PRM						
Kelantan	P024	Kubang Kerian	113,640	Malay/Muslim	Tuan Ibrahim Tuan Man	PN (PAS)	Nurul Amal Mohd Fauzi	UMNO	Wan Ahmad Kamil Wan Abdullah	AMANAH	Tuan Ibrahim Tuan Man	PAS	Mohamad Rizal Razali	PEJUANG								
Kelantan	P025	Bachok	123,183	Malay/Muslim	Nik Mohamed Abduh Nik Abdul Aziz	PN (PAS)	Mohd Zain Yasim	UMNO	Nur Azmiza Mamat	PKR	Mohd Syahir Che Sulaiman	PAS	Kamarul Azam Abdel Osman	PUTRA	Mohd Zulkifli Zakaria	IND						
Kelantan	P026	Ketereh	85,281	Malay/Muslim	Annuar Musa	BN (UMNO)	Marzuani Ardila Ariffin	UMNO	Rahimi L Muhamud	PKR	Khlir Mohd Nor	BERSATU	Hanif Ibrahim	PUTRA								
Kelantan	P027	Tanah Merah	98,782	Malay/Muslim	Ikmal Hisham Abdul Aziz	PN (BERSATU)	Bakri @ Mohd Bakri Mustapha	UMNO	Mohamad Supardi Md Noor	PKR	Ikmal Hisham Abdul Aziz	BERSATU	Mohd Nasir Abdullah	PUTRA	Nik Sapeia Nik Yusoff	IND						
Kelantan	P028	Pasir Puteh	113,070	Malay/Muslim	Nik Muhammad Zawawi Salleh	PN (PAS)	Zawawi Othman	UMNO	Muhammad Husin	AMANAH	Nik Muhammad Zawawi Salleh	PAS	Wan Marzudi Wan Umar	PEJUANG								
Kelantan	P029	Machang	88,825	Malay/Muslim	Ahmad Jazlan Yaakub	BN (UMNO)	Ahmad Jazlan Yaakub	UMNO	Rosli Allani Abdul Kadir	PKR	Wan Ahmad Fayhsal Wan Ahmad Kamal	BERSATU	Mohammad Seman	PUTRA								
Kelantan	P030	Jeli	59,798	Malay/Muslim	Mustapa Mohamed	PN (BERSATU)	Norwahida Patuan	UMNO	Md Radzi Wahab	AMANAH	Zahari Kechik	BERSATU	Mohammad Daud	PUTRA								
Kelantan	P031	Kuala Krai	92,335	Malay/Muslim	Ab Latiff Ab Rahman	PN (PAS)	Mohamed Zulkepli Omar	UMNO	Mohd Hisyamuddin Ghazali	AMANAH	Abdul Latiff Abdul Rahman	PAS	Norashikin Che Umar	PEJUANG								
Kelantan	P032	Gua Musang	70,254	Malay/Muslim	Tengku Razaleigh Hamzah	BN (UMNO)	Tengku Razaleigh Hamzah	UMNO	Asharun Uji	PKR	Mohd Azizi Abu Naim	BERSATU	Samsu Adabi Mamat	PEJUANG								
Terengganu	P033	Besut	111,650	Malay/Muslim	Idris Jusoh	BN (UMNO)	Nawi Mohamad	UMNO	Abd Rahman @ Abd Aziz Abas	AMANAH	Che Mohamad Zulkifly Jusoh	PAS	Wan Nazari Wan Jusoh	PEJUANG								
Terengganu	P034	Setiu	107,294	Malay/Muslim	Shaharizukirnain Abd. Kadir	PN (PAS)	Abdul Rahman Mat Yasin	UMNO	Mohamad Ngah	PKR	Shaharizukirnain Abdul Kadir	PAS	Wan Adnan Wan Ali	PEJUANG								
Terengganu	P035	Kuala Nerus	105,952	Malay/Muslim	Mohd Khairuddin Aman Razali	IND	Mohd Khairuddin Aman Razali	BN	Suhaimi Hashim	AMANAH	Alias Razak	PAS	Azahar Wahid	PUTRA								
Terengganu	P036	Kuala Terengganu	123,305	Malay/Muslim	Ahmad Amzad Mohamed @ Hashim	PN (PAS)	Mohd Zubir Embong	UMNO	Raja Kamarul Bahrin Shah Raja Ahmad	AMANAH	Ahmad Amzad Mohamed @ Hashim	PAS	Mohamad Abu Bakar Muda	PUTRA								
Terengganu	P037	Marang	131,756	Malay/Muslim	Abdul Hadi Awang	PN (PAS)	Jasmira Othman	UMNO	Azhar Abdul Shukur	AMANAH	Abdul Hadi Awang	PAS	Zarawi Sulong	PUTRA								
Terengganu	P038	Hulu Terengganu	87,917	Malay/Muslim	Rosol Wahid	PN (BERSATU)	Rozi Mamat	UMNO	Alias Ismail	PKR	Rosol Wahid	BERSATU	Mohd. Khadri Abdullah	PUTRA								
Terengganu	P039	Dungun	115,559	Malay/Muslim	Wan Hassan Mohd Ramli	PN (PAS)	Nurhisam Johari	UMNO	Mohasdjone @ Mohd Johari Mohamad	PKR	Wan Hassan Mohd Ramli	PAS	Noraisah Hasan	PEJUANG	Ghazali Ismail	IND						
Terengganu	P040	Kemaman	139,423	Malay/Muslim	Che Alias Hamid	PN (PAS)	Ahmad Said	UMNO	Hasuni Sudin	PKR	Che Alias Hamid	PAS	Rosli Abd Ghani	PEJUANG								
Pulau Pinang	P041	Kepala Batas	83,081	Malay/Muslim	Reezal Merican Naina Merican	BN (UMNO)	Reezal Merican Naina Merican	UMNO	Muhammad Danial Abdul Majeed	MUDA	Siti Mastura Mohamad	PAS	Hamidi Abu Hassan	BERJASA|								
Pulau Pinang	P042	Tasek Gelugor	80,868	Malay/Muslim	Shabudin Yahaya	PN (BERSATU)	Muhamad Yusoff Mohd Noor	UMNO	Nik Abdul Razak Nik Md Ridzuan	AMANAH	Wan Saifulruddin Wan Jan	BERSATU	Abdul Halim Sher Jung	GB	Mohamed Akmal Azhar	WARISAN						
Pulau Pinang	P043	Bagan	89,447	Chinese	Lim Guan Eng	PH (DAP)	Tan Chuan Hong	MCA	Lim Guan Eng	DAP	Alan Oh @ Oh Teik Choon	BERSATU	Mohammed Hafiz Mohamed Abu Bakar	IMAN								
Pulau Pinang	P044	Permatang Pauh	107,186	Malay/Muslim	Nurul Izzah Anwar	PH (PKR)	Mohd Zaidi Mohd Zaid	UMNO	Nurul Izzah Anwar	PKR	Muhammad Fawwaz Mat Jan	PAS	Mohamad Nasir Osman	PUTRA								
Pulau Pinang	P045	Bukit Mertajam	120,819	Chinese	Steven Sim Chee Keong	PH (DAP)	Tan Yang Pang	MCA	Steven Sim Chee Keong	DAP	Steven Koh Tien Yew	PAS										
Pulau Pinang	P046	Batu Kawan	88,812	Chinese	Kasthuriraani Patto	PH (DAP)	Tan Lee Huat	MCA	Chow Kon Yeow	DAP	Wong Chia Zen	GERAKAN			Ong Chin Wen	WARISAN	Lee Ah Liang	PRM				
Pulau Pinang	P047	Nibong Tebal	100,062	Mixed	Mansor Othman	PN (BERSATU)	Thanenthiran Ramankutty	MMSP	Fadhlina Sidek	PKR	Mansor Othman	BERSATU			Goh Kheng Huat	IND						
Pulau Pinang	P048	Bukit Bendera	92,521	Chinese	Wong Hon Wai	PH (DAP)	Richie Huan Xin Yun	PCM	Syerleena Abdul Rashid	DAP	Hng Chee Wey	GERAKAN			Teh Yee Cheu	PRM	Razalif Mohd Zain	IND				
Pulau Pinang	P049	Tanjong	52,803	Chinese	Chow Kon Yeow	PH (DAP)	Tan Kim Nee	MCA	Lim Hui Ying	DAP	H'ng Khoon Leng	GERAKAN										
Pulau Pinang	P050	Jelutong	93,989	Chinese	Sanisvara Nethaji Rayer Rajaji Rayer	PH (DAP)	Loganathan Thoraisamy	IPF	Sanisvara Nethaji Rayer Rajaji Rayer	DAP	Baljit Singh Jigiri Singh	GERAKAN			Martin Lim Huat Poh	WARISAN	Koh Swe Yong	PRM	Mohamed Yacoob Mohamed Noor	IND		
Pulau Pinang	P051	Bukit Gelugor	117,134	Chinese	Ramkarpal Singh	PH (DAP)	Wong Chin Chong	MCA	Ramkarpal Singh	DAP	Thinaganarabhan Padmanabhan	BERSATU										
Pulau Pinang	P052	Bayan Baru	119,640	Mixed	Sim Tze Tzin	PH (PKR)	Saw Yee Fung	MCA	Sim Tze Tzin	PKR	Oh Tong Keong	GERAKAN			Jeff Ooi Chuan Aun	WARISAN	Ravinder Singh	PRM	Kan Chee Yuen	IND		
Pulau Pinang	P053	Balik Pulau	80,264	Malay/Muslim	Muhammad Bakhtiar Wan Chik	PH (PKR)	Shah Headan Ayoob Hussain Shah	UMNO	Muhammad Bakhtiar Wan Chik	PKR	Muhammad Harris Idaham Abdul Rashid	BERSATU	Ahmad Fazli Mohammad	PEJUANG	Sabaruddin Ahmad	IND	Johnny Ch'ng Ewe Gee	IND				
Perak	P054	Gerik	47,565	Malay/Muslim	Vacant	VAC	Asyraf Wajdi Dusuki	UMNO	Ahmad Tarmizi Mohd Jam	DAP	Fathul Huzir Ayob	BERSATU										
Perak	P055	Lenggong	36,950	Malay/Muslim	Shamsul Anuar Nasarah	BN (UMNO)	Shamsul Anuar Nasarah	UMNO	Jurey Latiff Mohd Rosli	PKR	Muhammad Rif'aat Razman	PAS										
Perak	P056	Larut	65,719	Malay/Muslim	Hamzah Zainudin	PN (BERSATU)	Mohd Shafiq Fhadly Mahmud	UMNO	Zolkarnain Abidin	AMANAH	Hamzah Zainudin	BERSATU	Auzaie Fadzlan Shahidi	BERJASA								
Perak	P057	Parit Buntar	68,502	Malay/Muslim	Mujahid Yusof Rawa	PH (AMANAH)	Imran Mohd Yusof	UMNO	Mujahid Yusof Rawa	AMANAH	Mohd Misbahul Munir Masduki	PAS	Rohijas Md Sharif	PEJUANG								
Perak	P058	Bagan Serai	80,293	Malay/Muslim	Noor Azmi Ghazali	PN (BERSATU)	Zul Helmi Ghazali	UMNO	Siti Aishah Shaik Ismail	PKR	Idris Ahmad	PAS	Ahmad Luqman Ahmad Yahaya	PEJUANG								
Perak	P059	Bukit Gantang	94,253	Malay/Muslim	Syed Abu Hussin Hafiz Syed Abdul Fasal	PN (BERSATU)	Mohammad Sollehin Mohamad Tajie	UMNO	Fakhruldin Mohd Hashim	AMANAH	Syed Abu Hussin Hafiz Syed Abdul Fasal	BERSATU	Mohd Shukri Mohd Yusoff	PEJUANG								
Perak	P060	Taiping	121,566	Mixed	Teh Kok Lim	PH (DAP)	Neow Choo Seong	MCA	Wong Kah Woh	DAP	See Tean Seng	GERAKAN			Leow Thye Yih	IND	Mohganan P Manikam	IND	A. Rama Moorthy @ Steven Ram	IND		
Perak	P061	Padang Rengas	38,686	Malay/Muslim	Mohamed Nazri Abdul Aziz	BN (UMNO)	Mohd Arrif Abdul Majid	UMNO	Muhammad Kamil Abdul Munim	PKR	Azahari Hasan	BERSATU										
Perak	P062	Sungai Siput	72,395	Mixed	Kesavan Subramaniam	PH (PKR)	Vigneswaran Sanasee	MIC	Kesavan Subramaniam	PKR	Irudhanathan Gabriel	BERSATU	Ahmad Fauzi Mohd Jaafar	PEJUANG	R Indriani	IND	Baharudin Kamarudin	IND	Rajah Narasam	IND		
Perak	P063	Tambun	160,558	Malay/Muslim	Ahmad Faizal Azumu	PN (BERSATU)	Aminuddin Md Hanafiah	UMNO	Anwar Ibrahim	PKR	Ahmad Faizal Azumu	BERSATU	Abdul Rahim Tahir	PEJUANG								
Perak	P064	Ipoh Timor	118,178	Chinese	Wong Kah Woh	PH (DAP)	Ng Kai Cheong	MCA	Howard Lee Chuan How	DAP	Nor Afzainizam Salleh	BERSATU										
Perak	P065	Ipoh Barat	114,654	Chinese	Kulasegaran Murugeson	PH (DAP)	Low Guo Nan	MCA	Kulasegaran Murugeson	DAP	Chek Kwong Weng	GERAKAN			M. Kayveas	IND						
Perak	P066	Batu Gajah	111,896	Chinese	Sivakumar Varatharaju Naidu	PH (DAP)	Teoh Chin Chong	MCA	Sivakumar Varatharaju Naidu	DAP	Woo Cheong Yuen	GERAKAN										
Perak	P067	Kuala Kangsar	46,985	Malay/Muslim	Mastura Mohd Yazid	BN (UMNO)	Maslin Sham Razman	UMNO	Ahmad Termizi Ramli	AMANAH	Iskandar Dzulkarnain Abdul Khalid	BERSATU	Yusmalia Mohamad Yusof	PEJUANG								
Perak	P068	Beruas	108,249	Chinese	Ngeh Koo Ham	PH (DAP)	Ding Siew Chee	MCA	Ngeh Koo Ham	DAP	Ong Kean Sing	GERAKAN										
Perak	P069	Parit	47,915	Malay/Muslim	Mohd Nizar Zakaria	BN (UMNO)	Mohd Nizar Zakaria	UMNO	Nurthaqaffah Nordin	AMANAH	Muhamamd Ismi Mat Taib	PAS	Faizol Fadzli Mohamed	PEJUANG								
Perak	P070	Kampar	89,894	Chinese	Thomas Su Keong Siong	PH (DAP)	Lee Chee Leong	MCA	Chong Zhemin	DAP	Janice Wong Oi Foon	GERAKAN			Leong Cheok Keng	WARISAN						
Perak	P071	Gopeng	143,657	Mixed	Lee Boon Chye	PH (PKR)	Cally Ting Zhao Song	MCA	Tan Kar Hing	PKR	Muhammad Farhan Abdul Rahim	BERSATU			Balachandran Gopal	WARISAN						
Perak	P072	Tapah	61,946	Mixed	Saravanan Murugan	BN (MIC)	Saravanan Murugan	MIC	Saraswathy Kandasami	PKR	Muhammad Yadzan Mohammad	BERSATU	Mior Nor Haidir Suhaimi	PEJUANG	Mohamed Akbar Sherrif Ali Yasin	WARISAN	M Kathiravan	IND				
Perak	P073	Pasir Salak	74,761	Malay/Muslim	Tajuddin Abdul Rahman	BN (UMNO)	Khairul Azwan Harun	UMNO	Nik Omar Nik Abdul Aziz	PKR	Jamaluddin Yahya	PAS	Zairol Hizam Zakaria	PUTRA								
Perak	P074	Lumut	92,972	Malay/Muslim	Mohd Hatta Md Ramli	PH (AMANAH)	Zambry Abdul Kadir	UMNO	Mohd Hatta Md Ramli	AMANAH	Nordin Ahmad Ismail	BERSATU	Mazlan Abdul Ghani	PEJUANG	Mohd Isnin Mohd Ismail @ Ibrahim Khan	WARISAN						
Perak	P075	Bagan Datuk	58,183	Malay/Muslim	Ahmad Zahid Hamidi	BN (UMNO)	Ahmad Zahid Hamidi	UMNO	Shamsul Iskandar @ Yusre Mohd Akin	PKR	Muhammad Faiz Na'aman	BERSATU			Tawfik Ismail	IND						
Perak	P076	Teluk Intan	87,222	Mixed	Nga Kor Ming	PH (DAP)	Murugiah Thopasamy	MIC	Nga Kor Ming	DAP	Zainol Fadzi Paharudin	BERSATU	Amir Khusyairi Mohamad Tanusi	PEJUANG								
Perak	P077	Tanjong Malim	93,873	Malay/Muslim	Chang Lih Kang	PH (PKR)	Mah Hang Soon	MCA	Chang Lih Kang	PKR	Nolee Ashilin Mohammed Radzi	BERSATU	Amir Hamzah Abdul Razak	IMAN	Jamaluddin Mohd Radzi	IND	Izzat Johari	IND				
Pahang	P078	Cameron Highlands	46,020	Mixed	Ramli Mohd Nor	BN (UMNO)	Ramli Mohd Nor	UMNO	Chiong Yoke Kong	DAP	Abdul Rasid Mohamed Ali	BERSATU										
Pahang	P079	Lipis	47,124	Malay/Muslim	Abdul Rahman Mohamad	BN (UMNO)	Abdul Rahman Mohamad	UMNO	Tengku Zulpuri Shah Raja Puji	DAP	Mohamad Shahrum Osman	BERSATU	Aishaton Abu Bakar	PEJUANG								
Pahang	P080	Raub	75,064	Malay/Muslim	Tengku Zulpuri Shah Raja Puji	PH (DAP)	Chong Sin Woon	MCA	Chow Yu Hui	DAP	Fakrunizam Ibrahim	BERSATU	Norkhairul Anuar Mohamed Nor	PEJUANG								
Pahang	P081	Jerantut	87,051	Malay/Muslim	Ahmad Nazlan Idris	BN (UMNO)	Mohd Zukarmi Abu Bakar	UMNO	Hassan Basri Awang Mat Dahan	PKR	Khairil Nizam Khirudin	PAS										
Pahang	P082	Indera Mahkota	120,549	Malay/Muslim	Saifuddin Abdullah	PN (BERSATU)	Quek Tai Seong	MCA	Zuraidi Ismail	PKR	Saifuddin Abdullah	BERSATU	Mohamad Nor Sundari	BERJASA								
Pahang	P083	Kuantan	87,597	Malay/Muslim	Fuziah Salleh	PH (PKR)	Ab Hamid Mohd Nazahar	UMNO	Fuziah Salleh	PKR	Wan Razali Wan Nor	PAS	Anuar Tajuddin	PEJUANG								
Pahang	P084	Paya Besar	79,744	Malay/Muslim	Mohd. Shahar Abdullah	BN (UMNO)	Mohd. Shahar Abdullah	UMNO	Ahmad Azam Mohd Salleh	AMANAH	Aireroshairi Roslan	PAS	Rosminahar Mohd Amin	PEJUANG								
Pahang	P085	Pekan	119,443	Malay/Muslim	Vacant	VAC	Sh Mohmed Puzi Sh Ali	UMNO	Mohd Naim Zainal Abidin	PKR	Mohd Fadhil Noor Abdul Karim	PAS	Mohammad Radhi Abdul Razak	PEJUANG	Tengku Zainul Hisham Tengku Hussin	IND						
Pahang	P086	Maran	53,128	Malay/Muslim	Ismail Abdul Muttalib	BN (UMNO)	Shahaniza Shamsuddin	UMNO	Ahmad Shuhor Awang	AMANAH	Ismail Abdul Muttalib	PAS			Muhamad Hafiz Al-Hafiz	IND						
Pahang	P087	Kuala Krau	60,537	Malay/Muslim	Ismail Mohamed Said	BN (UMNO)	Ismail Mohamed Said	UMNO	Juhari Osman	AMANAH	Kamal Ashaari	PAS	Shahruddin Md Salleh	PEJUANG								
Pahang	P088	Temerloh	106,829	Malay/Muslim	Mohd Anuar Mohd Tahir	PH (AMANAH)	Mohd Sharkar Shamsudin	UMNO	Mohd Hasbie Muda	AMANAH	Salamiah Mohd Nor	PAS	Aminuddin Yahya	GB								
Pahang	P089	Bentong	87,058	Mixed	Wong Tack	PH (DAP)	Liow Tiong Lai	MCA	Young Syefura Othman	DAP	Roslan Hassan	BERSATU			Wong Tack	IND	Mohd Khalil Abdul Hamid	IND				
Pahang	P090	Bera	77,669	Malay/Muslim	Ismail Sabri Yaakob	BN (UMNO)	Ismail Sabri Yaakob	UMNO	Abas Awang	PKR	Asmawi Harun	BERSATU										
Pahang	P091	Rompin	89,131	Malay/Muslim	Hasan Arifin	BN (UMNO)	Hasan Arifin	UMNO	Erman Shah Jaios	PKR	Abdul Khalib Abdullah	BERSATU			Hamizi Hussain	IND						
Selangor	P092	Sabak Bernam	51,609	Malay/Muslim	Mohamad Fasiah Mohd Fakeh	PN (BERSATU)	Abdul Rahman Bakri	UMNO	Shamsul Ma'arif Ismail	AMANAH	Mohamad Fasiah Mohd Fakeh	BERSATU	Idris Md. Yusof	GB								
Selangor	P093	Sungai Besar	64,382	Malay/Muslim	Muslimin Yahaya	PN (BERSATU)	Jamal Yunos	UMNO	Saipolyazan Mat Yusop	PKR	Muslimin Yahaya	BERSATU	Asmawar Samat @ Samad	PUTRA								
Selangor	P094	Hulu Selangor	154,317	Malay/Muslim	June Leow Hsiad Hui	PH (PKR)	Mohan Thangarasu	MIC	Sathia Prakash Nadarajan	PKR	Mohd Hasnizan Harun	PAS	Harumaini Omar	PEJUANG	Haniza Mohamed Talha	PBM	Azlinda Baroni	IND				
Selangor	P095	Tanjong Karang	62,194	Malay/Muslim	Noh Omar	BN (UMNO)	Habibah Mohd Yusof	UMNO	Siti Rahayu Baharin	MUDA	Zulkafperi Hanapi	BERSATU	Azlan Sani Zawawi	GB	Mohd Rosni Mastol	IND						
Selangor	P096	Kuala Selangor	102,951	Malay/Muslim	Dzulkefly Ahmad	PH (AMANAH)	Tengku Zafrul Aziz	UMNO	Dzulkefly Ahmad	AMANAH	Mohd Noor Mohd Sahar	PAS	Mohd Shaid Rosli	PEJUANG								
Selangor	P097	Selayang	181,539	Malay/Muslim	William Leong Jee Keen	PH (PKR)	Chan Wun Hoong	MCA	William Leong Jee Keen	PKR	Abdul Rashid Asari	BERSATU	Salleh Amiruddin	PEJUANG	Muhammad Zaki Omar	IND						
Selangor	P098	Gombak	206,744	Malay/Muslim	Mohamed Azmin Ali	PN (BERSATU)	Megat Zulkarnain Omardin	UMNO	Amirudin Shari	PKR	Mohamed Azmin Ali	BERSATU	Aziz Jamaludin Mohd Tahir	PUTRA	Zulkifli Ahmad	IND						
Selangor	P099	Ampang	133,494	Malay/Muslim	Zuraida Kamaruddin	PBM	Ivone Low Yi Wen	MCA	Rodziah Ismail	PKR	Sasha Lyna Abdul Latif	BERSATU	Nurul Ashikin Mabahwi	PEJUANG	Bryan Lai Wai Chong	WARISAN	Zuraida Kamaruddin	PBM	Raveendran Marnokaran	IND	Tan Hua Meng	IND
Selangor	P099	Ampang	133,494	Malay/Muslim	Zuraida Kamaruddin	PBM	Ivone Low Yi Wen	MCA	Rodziah Ismail	PKR	Sasha Lyna Abdul Latif	BERSATU	Nurul Ashikin Mabahwi	PEJUANG	Muhammad Shafiq Izwan Mohd Yunos	IND						
Selangor	P100	Pandan	148,730	Mixed	Wan Azizah Wan Ismail	PH (PKR)	Leong Kok Wee	MCA	Rafizi Ramli	PKR	Muhammad Rafique Zubir Albakri	PAS	Nadia Hanafiah	GB	Ong Tee Keat	WARISAN						
Selangor	P101	Hulu Langat	166,902	Malay/Muslim	Hasanuddin Mohd Yunus	PH (AMANAH)	Johan Abdul Aziz	UMNO	Mohd Sany Hamzan	AMANAH	Mohd Radzi Abd Latif	BERSATU	Markiman Kobiran	PEJUANG	Abdul Rahman Jaafar	WARISAN	Muhammad Mustafa	IND				
Selangor	P102	Bangi	303,430	Mixed	Ong Kian Ming	PH (DAP)	Hoh Hee Lee	MCA	Syahredzan Johan	DAP	Muhammad Nazrul Hakim Md. Nazir	PAS	Annuar Salleh	BERJASA	Chee Chee Meng	PRM	Jamal Hisham Hashim	IND	Muhammad Fauzi Hasim	IND	Suthan Mookiah	IND
Selangor	P103	Puchong	152,861	Mixed	Gobind Singh Deo	PH (DAP)	Syed Ibrahim Syed Abdul Kader	KIMMA	Yeo Bee Yin	DAP	Jimmy Chew Jyh Gang	GERAKAN			Kuan Chee Heng	IND						
Selangor	P104	Subang	230,940	Chinese	Wong Chen	PH (PKR)	Kow Cheong Wei	MCA	Wong Chen	PKR	Alex Ang Hiang Ni	GERAKAN										
Selangor	P105	Petaling Jaya	195,148	Mixed	Maria Chin Abdullah	PH (PKR)	Chew Hian Tat	MCA	Lee Chean Chung	PKR	Theng Book	BERSATU	Mazween Mokhtar	GB	Ezam Mohd Nor	PRM	K J John	IND				
Selangor	P106	Damansara	239,103	Chinese	Tony Pua Kiam Wee	PH (DAP)	Tan Gim Tuan	MCA	Gobind Singh Deo	DAP	Lim Si Ching	GERAKAN										
Selangor	P107	Sungai Buloh	158,090	Malay/Muslim	Sivarasa Rasiah	PH (PKR)	Khairy Jamaluddin	UMNO	Ramanan Ramakrishnan	PKR	Mohd Ghazali Md Hamin	PAS	Mohd Akmal Mohd Yusoff	PEJUANG	Ahmad Zuhri Faisal	PRM	Nurhaslinda Basri	IND	Syed Abdul Razak Syed Long Alsagoff	IND		
Selangor	P108	Shah Alam	165,744	Malay/Muslim	Khalid Abdul Samad	PH (AMANAH)	Hizatul Isham Abdul Jalil	UMNO	Azli Yusof	AMANAH	Afif Bahardin	BERSATU	Muhammad Rafique Rashid Ali	PEJUANG								
Selangor	P109	Kapar	189,369	Malay/Muslim	Abdullah Sani Abdul Hamid	PH (PKR)	Muhammad Noor Azman	UMNO	Abdullah Sani Abdul Hamid	PKR	Halimah Ali	PAS	Mohd Pathan Hussin	BERJASA	Rahim Awang	WARISAN	Daroyah Alwi	PBM	VP Sevelinggam	IND		
Selangor	P110	Klang	208,913	Chinese	Charles Anthony Santiago	PH (DAP)	Tee Hooi Ling	MCA	Ganabatirau Veraman	DAP	Jaya Chandran Perumal	BERSATU			Loo Cheng Wee	WARISAN	Chandra Sivarajan	PRM	Hedrhin Ramli @ Awin	IND	JR Deepak Jaikishan	IND
Selangor	P111	Kota Raja	244,712	Mixed	Mohamad Sabu	PH (AMANAH)	Kajendran Doraisamy	MIC	Mohamad Sabu	AMANAH	Mohamed Diah Baharun	PAS	Fahmi Bazlan Muda	BERJASA	Che Sara Afiqah Zainul Arif	PRM	Kumar Karananendi	IND	P Raveentharan A Periasamy	IND	Suhendhar Selvaraju	IND
Selangor	P112	Kuala Langat	148,637	Malay/Muslim	Xavier Jayakumar Arulanandam	PBM	Mohana Muniandy Raman	MIC	Manivannan Gowindasamy	PKR	Ahmad Yunus Hairi	PAS	Mohd Ridzuan Abdullah	GB	Gaveson Murugeson	PRM	Zanariah Jumhuri	IND				
Selangor	P113	Sepang	168,039	Malay/Muslim	Mohamed Hanipa Maidin	PH (AMANAH)	Anuar Basiran	UMNO	Raj Munni Sabu @ Aiman Athirah	AMANAH	Rina Mohd Harun	BERSATU	Che Asmah Ibrahim	PEJUANG	Nageswaran Ravi	PRM	Mohd Daud Leong Abdullah	PUR	Muneswaran Muthiah	IND	Shahrul Amri Mat Sari	IND
Wilayah Persekutuan Kuala Lumpur	P114	Kepong	94,285	Chinese	Lim Lip Eng	PH (DAP)	Yap Zheng Hoe	MCA	Lim Lip Eng	DAP	Phang Jing Fatt	GERAKAN			Young Shang Yi	WARISAN	Yee Poh Ping	IND				
Wilayah Persekutuan Kuala Lumpur	P115	Batu	113,863	Mixed	Prabakaran Parameswaran	PH (PKR)	A. Kohilan Pillay	MIC	Prabakaran Parameswaran	PKR	Azhar Yahya	PAS	Wan Azliana Wan Adnan	PEJUANG	Naganathan Pillai	WARISAN	Zulkifli Abdul Fadlan	PRM	Nur Fathiah Syazwana Shaharuddin	IND	Siti Zabedah Kasim	IND
Wilayah Persekutuan Kuala Lumpur	P115	Batu	113,863	Mixed	Prabakaran Parameswaran	PH (PKR)	A. Kohilan Pillay	MIC	Prabakaran Parameswaran	PKR	Azhar Yahya	PAS	Wan Azliana Wan Adnan	PEJUANG	Too Gao Lan @ Too Cheng Huat	IND	Chua Tian Chang	IND	7272	dkd	937	d.d
Wilayah Persekutuan Kuala Lumpur	P116	Wangsa Maju	120,323	Malay/Muslim	Tan Yee Kew	PH (PKR)	Mohd Shafei Abdullah	UMNO	Zahir Hassan	PKR	Nuridah Mohd Salleh	PAS	Norzaila Arifin	PUTRA	Wee Choo Keong	WARISAN	Raveentheran Suntheralingam	IND				
Wilayah Persekutuan Kuala Lumpur	P117	Segambut	119,652	Chinese	Hannah Yeoh Tseow Suan	PH (DAP)	Daniel Ling Sia Chin	MCA	Hannah Yeoh Tseow Suan	DAP	Prabagaran Vythilingam	GERAKAN										
Wilayah Persekutuan Kuala Lumpur	P118	Setiawangsa	95,753	Malay/Muslim	Nik Nazmi Nik Ahmad	PH (PKR)	Izudin Ishak	UMNO	Nik Nazmi Nik Ahmad	PKR	Nurul Fadzilah Kamarulddin	BERSATU	Bibi Sunita Sakandar Khan	PEJUANG	Stanley Lim Yen Tiong	IND	Mior Rosli Mior Mohd Jaafar	IND				
Wilayah Persekutuan Kuala Lumpur	P119	Titiwangsa	80,747	Malay/Muslim	Rina Mohd Harun	PN (BERSATU)	Johari Abdul Ghani	UMNO	Khalid Samad	AMANAH	Rosni Adam	PAS	Khairuddin Abu Hassan	PEJUANG								
Wilayah Persekutuan Kuala Lumpur	P120	Bukit Bintang	79,782	Chinese	Fong Kui Lun	PH (DAP)	Tan Teik Peng	MCA	Fong Kui Lun	DAP	Edwin Chen Win Keong	BERSATU										
Wilayah Persekutuan Kuala Lumpur	P121	Lembah Pantai	101,828	Malay/Muslim	Ahmad Fahmi Mohamed Fadzil	PH (PKR)	Ramlan Shahean @ Askolani	UMNO	Ahmad Fahmi Mohamed Fadzil	PKR	Fauzi Abu Bakar	PAS	Noor Asmah Mohd Razalli	PUTRA								
Wilayah Persekutuan Kuala Lumpur	P122	Seputeh	124,805	Chinese	Teresa Kok Suh Sim	PH (DAP)	Lee Kah Hing	MCA	Teresa Kok Suh Sim	DAP	Alan Wong Yee Yeng	GERAKAN			Lee Wai Hong	IND	Choy San Yeh @ Lian Choy Ling	IND				
Wilayah Persekutuan Kuala Lumpur	P123	Cheras	101,184	Chinese	Tan Kok Wai	PH (DAP)	Chong Yew Chuan	MCA	Tan Kok Wai	DAP	Ruby Chin Yoke Kheng	BERSATU										
Wilayah Persekutuan Kuala Lumpur	P124	Bandar Tun Razak	119,185	Malay/Muslim	Kamarudin Jaffar	PN (BERSATU)	Chew Yin Keen	MCA	Wan Azizah Wan Ismail	PKR	Kamarudin Jaffar	BERSATU										
Wilayah Persekutuan Putrajaya	P125	Putrajaya	42,881	Malay/Muslim	Tengku Adnan Tengku Mansor	BN (UMNO)	Tengku Adnan Tengku Mansor	UMNO	Noraishah Mydin Abdul Aziz	PKR	Radzi Jidin	BERSATU	Mohd Rosli Ramli	BERJASA	Samsudin Mohamad Fauzi	IND	Lim Fice Bee	IND				
Negeri Sembilan	P126	Jelebu	59,561	Malay/Muslim	Jalaluddin Alias	BN (UMNO)	Jalaluddin Alias	UMNO	Zulkefly Mohamad Omar	AMANAH	Zaharuddin Baba Samon	BERSATU	Ahmad Fakri Abu Samah	PUTRA								
Negeri Sembilan	P127	Jempol	95,813	Malay/Muslim	Mohd Salim Mohd Shariff	BN (UMNO)	Shamshulkahar Mohd. Deli	UMNO	Norwani Ahmat	AMANAH	Muhammad Noraffendy Mohd Salleh	BERSATU	Mohd Khalid Mohd Yunus	PUTRA								
Negeri Sembilan	P128	Seremban	157,244	Malay/Muslim	Anthony Loke Siew Fook	PH (DAP)	Felicia Wong Yin Ting	MCA	Anthony Loke Siew Fook	DAP	Mohd Fadli Che Me	PAS	Mohamad Jani Ismail	PEJUANG	Izzat Lesly	IND						
Negeri Sembilan	P129	Kuala Pilah	63,247	Malay/Muslim	Eddin Syazlee Shith	PN (BERSATU)	Adnan Abu Hassan	UMNO	Nor Azman Mohamad	PKR	Eddin Syazlee Shith	BERSATU	Kamarulzaman Kamdias	PUTRA	Azman Idris	WARISAN						
Negeri Sembilan	P130	Rasah	155,896	Mixed	Cha Kee Chin	PH (DAP)	Ng Kian Nam	MCA	Cha Kee Chin	DAP	David Choong Vee Hing	GERAKAN										
Negeri Sembilan	P131	Rembau	133,555	Malay/Muslim	Khairy Jamaluddin	BN (UMNO)	Mohamad Hasan	UMNO	Julfitri Joha	PKR	Mohd Nazree Mohd Yunus	BERSATU	Ramly Awalludin	PEJUANG	Tinagaran Subramaniam	PSM	Cikgu Tina					
Negeri Sembilan	P132	Port Dickson	104,450	Mixed	Anwar Ibrahim	PH (PKR)	P. Kamalanathan	MIC	Aminuddin Harun	PKR	Rafei Mustapha	PAS	Ahmad Idham Ahmad Nazri	GB	Abdul Rani Kulup Abdullah	IND						
Negeri Sembilan	P133	Tampin	81,099	Malay/Muslim	Hasan Bahrom	PH (AMANAH)	Mohd Isam Mohd Isa	UMNO	Muhammad Faiz Fadzil	AMANAH	Abdul Halim Abu Bakar	PAS	Zamani Ibrahim	BERJASA								
Melaka	P134	Masjid Tanah	69,174	Malay/Muslim	Mas Ermieyati Samsudin	PN (BERSATU)	Abdul Hakim Abdul Wahid	UMNO	Muthalib Uthman	MUDA	Mas Ermieyati Samsudin	BERSATU	Handrawirawan Abu Bakar	PEJUANG								
Melaka	P135	Alor Gajah	93,311	Malay/Muslim	Mohd Redzuan Md Yusof	PN (BERSATU)	Shahril Sufian Hamdan	UMNO	Adly Zahari	AMANAH	Mohd Redzuan Md Yusof	BERSATU	Muhammad Nazriq Abdul Rahman	BERJASA|								
Melaka	P136	Tangga Batu	115,998	Malay/Muslim	Rusnah Aluai	PH (PKR)	Lim Ban Hong	MCA	Rusnah Aluai	PKR	Bakri Jamaluddin	PAS	Ghazali Abu	PUTRA	Shahril Mahmood	IND						
Melaka	P137	Hang Tuah Jaya	118,493	Malay/Muslim	Shamsul Iskandar @ Yusre Mohd Akin	PH (PKR)	Mohd Ridhwan Mohd Ali	UMNO	Adam Adli Abdul Halim	PKR	Mohd Azrudin Md Idris	BERSATU	Sheikh Ikhzan Sheikh Salleh	PEJUANG								
Melaka	P138	Kota Melaka	164,140	Chinese	Khoo Poay Tiong	PH (DAP)	Kon Qi Yao	MCA	Khoo Poay Tiong	DAP	Suhame Borhan	GERAKAN			Norazlanshah Hazali	IND						
Melaka	P139	Jasin	96,208	Malay/Muslim	Ahmad Hamzah	BN (UMNO)	Roslan Ahmad	UMNO	Harun Mohamed	AMANAH	Zulkifli Ismail	PAS	Mohd Daud Nasir	PEJUANG								
Johor	P140	Segamat	69,360	Mixed	Edmund Santhara Kumar Ramanaidu	PBM	Ramasamy Muthusamy	MIC	Yuneswaran Ramaraj	PKR	Poobalan Ponusamy	BERSATU	Syed Hairoul Faizey Syed Ali	PUTRA								
Johor	P141	Sekijang	63,981	Malay/Muslim	Natrah Ismail	PH (PKR)	Md Salleheen Mohamad	UMNO	Zaliha Mustafa	PKR	Uzzair Ismail	BERSATU	Mohd Saiful Faizal Abd Halim	PUTRA	Mohd Zohar Ahmad	WARISAN						
Johor	P142	Labis	49,846	Mixed	Pang Hok Liong	PH (DAP)	Chua Tee Yong	MCA	Pang Hok Liong	DAP	Alvin Chang Teck Kiam	BERSATU										
Johor	P143	Pagoh	69,939	Malay/Muslim	Muhyiddin Yassin	PN (BERSATU)	Razali Ibrahim	UMNO	Iskandar Shah Abdul Rahman	PKR	Muhyiddin Yassin	BERSATU										
Johor	P144	Ledang	104,577	Malay/Muslim	Syed Ibrahim Syed Noh	PH (PKR)	Hamim Samuri	UMNO	Syed Ibrahim Syed Noh	PKR	Zaidi Abd Majid	BERSATU	Rafidah Ridwan	PEJUANG	Yunus Mustakim	IND	Zainal Bahrom	IND				
Johor	P145	Bakri	97,335	Chinese	Yeo Bee Yin	PH (DAP)	Lee Ching Yong	MCA	Tan Hong Pin	DAP	Chelvarajan Suppiah	BERSATU			Haron Jaffar	IND						
Johor	P146	Muar	68,925	Malay/Muslim	Syed Saddiq Syed Abdul Rahman	MUDA	Mohd Helmy Abd Latif	UMNO	Syed Saddiq Syed Abdul Rahman	MUDA	Abdullah Husin	PAS										
Johor	P147	Parit Sulong	79,484	Malay/Muslim	Noraini Ahmad	BN (UMNO)	Noraini Ahmad	UMNO	Mohd Faizal Dollah	AMANAH	Abdul Karim Deraman	PAS										
Johor	P148	Ayer Hitam	61,041	Malay/Muslim	Wee Ka Siong	BN (MCA)	Wee Ka Siong	MCA	Sheikh Umar Bagharib Ali	DAP	Muhammad Syafiq A Aziz	BERSATU										
Johor	P149	Sri Gading	78,602	Malay/Muslim	Shahruddin Md Salleh	GTA (PEJUANG)	Mohd Lassim Burhan	UMNO	Aminolhuda Hassan	AMANAH	Zanariyah Abdul Hamid	PAS	Mahdzir Ibrahim	PEJUANG								
Johor	P150	Batu Pahat	133,910	Malay/Muslim	Mohd Rashid Hasnon	PN (BERSATU)	Ishak @ Mohd Farid Siraj	UMNO	Onn Abu Bakar	PKR	Mohd Rashid Hasnon	BERSATU	Nizam Bashir Abdul Kariem Bashier	PEJUANG	Zahari Osman	PRM						
Johor	P151	Simpang Renggam	59,033	Malay/Muslim	Maszlee Malik	PH (PKR)	Hasni Mohammad	UMNO	Maszlee Malik	PKR	Mohd Fazrul Kamat	BERSATU	Kamal Kusmin	PUTRA								
Johor	P152	Kluang	132,342	Mixed	Wong Shu Qi	PH (DAP)	Gan Ping Sieu	MCA	Wong Shu Qi	DAP	Dzulkarnain Alias	BERSATU			Ramendran Ulaganathan	IND						
Johor	P153	Sembrong	54,982	Malay/Muslim	Hishammuddin Hussein	BN (UMNO)	Hishamuddin Hussein	UMNO	Hasni Abas	PKR	Aziz Ismail	BERSATU										
Johor	P154	Mersing	66,275	Malay/Muslim	Abdul Latiff Ahmad	PN (BERSATU)	Abdul Latif Bandi @ Nor Sebandi	UMNO	Fatin Zulaikha Zaidi	DAP	Muhammad Islahuddin Abas	BERSATU	Nurfatimah Ibrahim	PEJUANG	Ismail Don	IND						
Johor	P155	Tenggara	67,294	Malay/Muslim	Adham Baba	BN (UMNO)	Manndzri Nasib	UMNO	Zuraidah Zainab Mohd Zain	PKR	Mohd Nazari Mokhtar	PAS	M Azhar Palal	PUTRA								
Johor	P156	Kota Tinggi	61,291	Malay/Muslim	Halimah Mohamed Sadique	BN (UMNO)	Mohamed Khaled Nordin	UMNO	Onn Jaafar	AMANAH	Mohamad Ridhwan Rasman	BERSATU										
Johor	P157	Pengerang	55,316	Malay/Muslim	Azalina Othman Said	BN (UMNO)	Azalina Othman Said	UMNO	Che Zakaria Mohd Salleh	AMANAH	Fairulnizar Rahmat	BERSATU										
Johor	P158	Tebrau	223,301	Mixed	Steven Choong Shiau Yoon	PBM	Nicole Wong Siaw Ting	MCA	Jimmy Puah Wee Tse	PKR	Mohamad Isa Mohamad Basir	BERSATU										
Johor	P159	Pasir Gudang	198,485	Mixed	Hassan Abdul Karim	PH (PKR)	Noor Azleen Ambros	UMNO	Hassan Abdul Karim	PKR	Mohamad Farid Abdul Razak	BERSATU	Mohammad Raffi Beran	IMAN								
Johor	P160	Johor Bahru	136,368	Malay/Muslim	Akmal Nasrullah Mohd Nasir	PH (PKR)	Johan Arifin Mohd Ropi	UMNO	Akmal Nasrullah Mohd Nasir	PKR	Mohd Mohtaj Yacob	BERSATU	Mohd Akhiri Mahmood	PEJUANG								
Johor	P161	Pulai	165,313	Mixed	Salahuddin Ayub	PH (AMANAH)	Nur Jazlan Mohamed	UMNO	Salahuddin Ayub	AMANAH	Loh Kah Yong	GERAKAN										
Johor	P162	Iskandar Puteri	222,437	Mixed	Lim Kit Siang	PH (DAP)	Jason Teoh Sew Hock	MCA	Liew Chin Tong	DAP	Jashen Tan Nam Cha	BERSATU										
Johor	P163	Kulai	151,247	Mixed	Teo Nie Ching	PH (DAP)	Chua Jian Boon	MCA	Teo Nie Ching	DAP	Tan Chin Hok	GERAKAN										
Johor	P164	Pontian	75,212	Malay/Muslim	Ahmad Maslan	BN (UMNO)	Ahmad Maslan	UMNO	Shazwan Zainal Abidin	DAP	Isa Ab Hamid	BERSATU	Jamaluddin Mohamad	GB								
Johor	P165	Tanjung Piai	70,679	Malay/Muslim	Wee Jeck Seng	BN (MCA)	Wee Jeck Seng	MCA	Lim Wei Jiet	MUDA	Najwah Halimah Ab Alim	BERSATU										

== Eastern Malaysia ==
State	No.	Constituency	Number of voters	Ethnic Majority (as of 2018)	Incumbent Member of Parliament	Incumbent Coalition (Party)	Political coalitions and respective candidates and parties															
State	No.	Constituency	Number of voters	Ethnic Majority (as of 2018)	Incumbent Member of Parliament	Incumbent Coalition (Party)	Barisan Nasional + Gabungan Rakyat Sabah		Pakatan Harapan + MUDA		Perikatan Nasional		Gerakan Tanah Air (informal coalition)		Other parties/Independents							
State	No.	Constituency	Number of voters	Ethnic Majority (as of 2018)	Incumbent Member of Parliament	Incumbent Coalition (Party)	Candidate name	Party	Candidate name	Party	Candidate name	Party	Candidate name	Party	Candidate name	Party	Candidate name	Party	Candidate name	Party	Candidate name	Party
Wilayah Persekutuan Labuan	P166	Labuan	44,484	Mixed	Rozman Isli	WARISAN	Bashir Alias	UMNO	Ramli Tahir	AMANAH	Suhaili Abdul Rahman	BERSATU	Ramle Mat Daly	PUTRA	Rozman Isli	WARISAN	Dayang Rusimah @ Raynie Mohd Din	PBM				
Sabah	P167	Kudat	75,724	Muslim Bumiputera	Abdul Rahim Bakri	GRS (PN-BERSATU)	Ruddy Awah	BERSATU	Thonny Chee	PKR			Nur Alya Humaira Usun Abdullah	PEJUANG	Abdul Rashid Abdul Harun	WARISAN	Verdon Bahanda	IND				
Sabah	P168	Kota Marudu	80,735	Non-Muslim Bumiputera	Maximus Ongkili	GRS (PBS)	Maximus Ongkili	PBS	Shahrizal Denci	MUDA			Mohd Azmee Zulkiflee	PEJUANG	Jilid Kuminding @ Zainuddin	WARISAN	Wetrom Bahanda	KDM	Norman Tulang	IND		
Sabah	P169	Kota Belud	79,885	Muslim Bumiputera	Isnaraissah Munirah Majilis @ Fakharudy	WARISAN	Abdul Rahman Dahlan	UMNO	Madeli @ Modily Bangali	PKR					Isnaraissah Munirah Majilis @ Fakharudy	WARISAN						
Sabah	P170	Tuaran	83,419	Mixed	Wilfred Madius Tangau	PH (UPKO)	Joniston Bangkuai	PBS	Wilfred Madius Tangau	UPKO			Muminin Kalingkong @ Norbinsha	PEJUANG	Joanna Rampas	WARISAN	Noortaip Suhaili @ Sualee	IND	Boby Lewat	IND		
Sabah	P171	Sepanggar	108,370	Mixed	Mohd Azis Jamman	WARISAN	Yakubah Khan	UMNO	Mustapha @ Mohd Yunus Sakmud	PKR			Yusof Kunchang	PEJUANG	Mohd Azis Jamman	WARISAN	Jumardie Lukman	KDM				
Sabah	P172	Kota Kinabalu	74,059	Chinese	Chan Foong Hin	PH (DAP)	Yee Tsai Yiew	PBS	Chan Foong Hin	DAP					Amanda Yeo Yan Yin	WARISAN	Winston Liew Kit Siong	KDM	Marcel Jude	IND		
Sabah	P173	Putatan	63,173	Mixed	Awang Husaini Sahari	PH (PKR)	Shahelmey Yahya	UMNO	Awang Husaini Sahari	PKR			Poyne Tudus @ Patrick Payne	GB	Ahmad Mohd Said	WARISAN						
Sabah	P174	Penampang	77,214	Non-Muslim Bumiputera	Ignatius Dorell Leiking	WARISAN	Kenny Chua Teck Ho	STAR	Ewon Benedick	UPKO					Ignatius Dorell Leiking	WARISAN	Richard Jimmy	IND				
Sabah	P175	Papar	59,942	Muslim Bumiputera	Ahmad Hassan	WARISAN	Armizan Mohd Ali	BERSATU	Henry Shim Chee On	DAP			Nicholas Sylvester @ Berry	PEJUANG	Ahmad Hassan	WARISAN	Norbert Chin	IND	Johnny Sitamin	IND		
Sabah	P176	Kimanis	40,763	Muslim Bumiputera	Mohamad Alamin	BN (UMNO)	Mohamad Alamin	UMNO	Rowindy Lawrence Odong	UPKO			Yusop Osman	PEJUANG	Daud Yusof	WARISAN	Amat Mohd Yusof	KDM				
Sabah	P177	Beaufort	43,248	Muslim Bumiputera	Azizah Mohd Dun	GRS (PN-BERSATU)	Siti Aminah Aching	UMNO	Dikin Musah	PKR					Masri Adul	WARISAN	Johair Mat Lani	KDM	Johan @ Christopher O T Ghani	IND	Matlani Sabli	IND
Sabah	P178	Sipitang	45,871	Mixed	Yamani Hafez Musa	GRS (PN-BERSATU)	Matbali Musah	BERSATU	Lahirul Latigul	AMANAH					Adnan Puteh	WARISAN						
Sabah	P179	Ranau	66,517	Non-Muslim Bumiputera	Jonathan Yasin	GRS (PN-BERSATU)	Jonathan Yasin	BERSATU	Apirin Jahalan Taufik Sham	PKR			Azizul Julrin	PEJUANG	Markos Siton	WARISAN	Ewon Ebin	PBRS				
Sabah	P180	Keningau	87,588	Non-Muslim Bumiputera	Jeffrey Kitingan	GRS (PN-STAR)	Jeffrey Kitingan	STAR	Grelydia Gillod	DAP					Rasinin Kautis	WARISAN	Jake Nointin	KDM				
Sabah	P181	Tenom	42,045	Non-Muslim Bumiputera	Noorita Sual	PH (DAP)	Jamawi Jaaafar	UMNO	Noorita Sual	DAP					Ukim Buandi	WARISAN	Riduan Rubin	IND	Peggy Chaw Zhi Ting	IND		
Sabah	P182	Pensiangan	55,672	Non-Muslim Bumiputera	Arthur Joseph Kurup	BN (PBRS)	Arthur Joseph Kurup	PBRS	Sangkar Rasam	PKR			Jamani Derimin @ Gampalid	PEJUANG	Siti Noorhasmahwatty Osman	WARISAN	Jekerison Kilan	KDM				
Sabah	P183	Beluran	44,727	Non-Muslim Bumiputera	Ronald Kiandee	GRS (PN-BERSATU)	Benedict Asmat	UMNO	Felix Joseph Saang	UPKO	Ronald Kiandee	BERSATU	Hausing Sudin @ Samsudin	PEJUANG	Rowiena Rashid	WARISAN						
Sabah	P184	Libaran	72,332	Muslim Bumiputera	Zakaria Edris	GRS (PN-BERSATU)	Suhaimi Nasir	UMNO	Peter Jr Naintin	UPKO			Jeffri @ Amat Pudang	PEJUANG	SH Bokrata SH Hassan	WARISAN	Nordin Khani	PPRS	Amdan Tumpong	IND		
Sabah	P185	Batu Sapi	43,916	Mixed	Vacant	VAC	Khairul Firdaus Akhbar Khan	BERSATU	Liau Fui Fui	DAP			Boni Yusuf Abdullah @ Narseso P Juanico	PUTRA	Alias Sani	WARISAN	Othman Ahmad	IND				
Sabah	P186	Sandakan	55,542	Mixed	Vivian Wong Shir Yee	PH (DAP)	Lau Chee Kiong @ Thomas Lau	SAPP	Vivian Wong Shir Yee	DAP					Alex Thien	WARISAN	Peter Hii	IND	Syeikh Lokeman	IND	Lita Tan Abdullah	IND
Sabah	P187	Kinabatangan	44,773	Muslim Bumiputera	Bung Mokhtar Radin	BN (UMNO)	Bung Mokhtar Radin	UMNO							Mazliwati Abdul Malek	WARISAN						
Sabah	P188	Lahad Datu	100,256	Muslim Bumiputera	Mohammadin Ketapi	PBM	Maizatul Alkam Alawi	UMNO	Oscar Sia Yu Hock	DAP					Mohd Yusof Apdal	WARISAN						
Sabah	P189	Semporna	72,169	Muslim Bumiputera	Mohd Shafie Apdal	WARISAN	Nixon Abdul Habi	BERSATU	Arastam Paradong	PKR			Ab Rajik Ab Hamid	PEJUANG	Mohd Shafie Apdal	WARISAN						
Sabah	P190	Tawau	87,477	Mixed	Christina Liew Chin Jin	PH (PKR)	Lo Su Fui	PBS	Christina Liew Chin Jin	PKR			Herman Amdas	PEJUANG	Chen Ket Chuin	WARISAN	Mohd Salleh Bacho	IND	Chin Chee Syn	IND		
Sabah	P191	Kalabakan	83,970	Muslim Bumiputera	Ma'mun Sulaiman	WARISAN	Andi Muhammad Suryady Bandy	UMNO	Noraini Abd Ghapur	PKR			Nur Aini Abdul Rahman	PEJUANG	Ma'mun Sulaiman	WARISAN	Muhamad Dhiauddin Hassan	IND				

State	No.	Constituency	Number of voters	Ethnic Majority (as of 2022)	Incumbent Member of Parliament	Incumbent Coalition (Party)	Political coalitions and respective candidates and parties													
State	No.	Constituency	Number of voters	Ethnic Majority (as of 2022)	Incumbent Member of Parliament	Incumbent Coalition (Party)	Gabungan Parti Sarawak		Pakatan Harapan		Perikatan Nasional		Gabungan Bersatu Rakyat Sarawak (PSB + PBK + PBDS)		Other parties/Independents					
State	No.	Constituency	Number of voters	Ethnic Majority (as of 2022)	Incumbent Member of Parliament	Incumbent Coalition (Party)	Candidate name	Party	Candidate name	Party	Candidate name	Party	Candidate name	Party	Candidate name	Party	Candidate name	Party	Candidate name	Party
Sarawak	P192	Mas Gading	47,171	Non-Muslim Bumiputera	Mordi Bimol	PH (DAP)	Lidang Disen	PDP	Mordi Bimol	DAP			Ryan Sim Min Leong	PBK						
Sarawak	P193	Santubong	79,540	Muslim Bumiputera	Wan Junaidi Tuanku Jaafar	GPS (PBB)	Nancy Shukri	PBB	Mohamad Zen Peli	AMANAH					Affendi Jeman	IND				
Sarawak	P194	Petra Jaya	109,809	Muslim Bumiputera	Fadillah Yusof	GPS (PBB)	Fadillah Yusof	PBB	Sopian Julaihi	PKR					Othman Abdillah	SEDAR				
Sarawak	P195	Bandar Kuching	109,710	Chinese	Kelvin Yii Lee Wuen	PH (DAP)	Tay Tze Kok	SUPP	Kelvin Yii Lee Wuen	DAP			Voon Lee Shan	PBK						
Sarawak	P196	Stampin	121,009	Chinese	Chong Chieng Jen	PH (DAP)	Lo Khere Chiang	SUPP	Chong Chieng Jen	DAP			Lue Cheng Hing	PBK						
Sarawak	P197	Kota Samarahan	82,229	Muslim Bumiputera	Rubiah Wang	GPS (PBB)	Rubiah Wang	PBB	Abang Abdul Halil Abang Naili	AMANAH										
Sarawak	P198	Puncak Borneo	79,969	Non-Muslim Bumiputera	Willie Mongin	GPS (PBB)	Willie Mongin	PBB	Diog Dios	PKR			Iana anak Akam	PSB						
Sarawak	P199	Serian	65,273	Non-Muslim Bumiputera	Richard Riot Jaem	GPS (SUPP)	Richard Riot Jaem	SUPP	Learry Jabul	DAP			Elsiy Tinggang	PSB	Alim Impira	IND				
Sarawak	P200	Batang Sadong	32,640	Muslim Bumiputera	Nancy Shukri	GPS (PBB)	Rodiyah Sapiee	PBB	Lahaji Lahiya	AMANAH										
Sarawak	P201	Batang Lupar	43,072	Muslim Bumiputera	Rohani Abdul Karim	GPS (PBB)	Mohamad Shafizan Kepli	PBB	Wel @ Maxwell Rojis	AMANAH	Hamdan Sani	PAS								
Sarawak	P202	Sri Aman	50,164	Non-Muslim Bumiputera	Masir Kujat	IND	Doris Sophia Brodi	PRS	Tay Wei Wei	PKR			Wilson Entabang	PSB	Masir Kujat	IND				
Sarawak	P203	Lubok Antu	28,995	Non-Muslim Bumiputera	Jugah Muyang	IND	Roy Angau Gingkoi	PRS	Langga Lias	PKR	Jugah Muyang	BERSATU	Johnical Rayong Ngipa	PSB						
Sarawak	P204	Betong	41,743	Mixed	Robert Lawson Chuat	GPS (PBB)	Richard Rapu @ Begri	PBB	Patrick Kamis	PKR					Hasbie Satar	IND				
Sarawak	P205	Saratok	44,531	Mixed	Ali Biju	PN (BERSATU)	Giendam Jonathan Tait	PDP	Ibil Jaya	PKR	Ali Biju	BERSATU								
Sarawak	P206	Tanjong Manis	32,948	Muslim Bumiputera	Yusuf Abd. Wahab	GPS (PBB)	Yusuf Abd. Wahab	PBB	Zainab Suhaili	AMANAH										
Sarawak	P207	Igan	28,290	Muslim Bumiputera	Ahmad Johnie Zawawi	GPS (PBB)	Ahmad Johnie Zawawi	PBB	Andri Zulkarnaen Hamden	AMANAH										
Sarawak	P208	Sarikei	55,018	Chinese	Wong Ling Biu	PH (DAP)	Huang Tiong Sii	SUPP	Roderick Wong Siew Lead	DAP										
Sarawak	P209	Julau	34,850	Non-Muslim Bumiputera	Larry Sng Wei Shien	PBM	Joseph Salang Gandum	PRS					Susan George	PBDS	Larry Sng Wei Shien	PBM	Elly Ngalai	IND		
Sarawak	P210	Kanowit	30,988	Non-Muslim Bumiputera	Aaron Ago Dagang	GPS (PRS)	Aaron Ago Dagang	PRS	Mohd Fauzi Abdullah @ Joseph	PKR					Elli Luhat	IND	Michael Lias	IND	George Chen	IND
Sarawak	P211	Lanang	87,356	Chinese	Alice Lau Kiong Yieng	PH (DAP)	Wong Ching Yong	SUPP	Alice Lau Kiong Yieng	DAP			Priscilla Lau	PBK	Wong Tiing Kiong	IND				
Sarawak	P212	Sibu	105,875	Chinese	Oscar Ling Chai Yew	PH (DAP)	Clarence Ting Ing Horh	SUPP	Oscar Ling Chai Yew	DAP			Wong Soon Koh	PSB						
Sarawak	P213	Mukah	46,964	Muslim Bumiputera	Hanifah Hajar Taib	GPS (PBB)	Hanifah Hajar Taib	PBB	Abdul Jalil Bujang	PKR										
Sarawak	P214	Selangau	45,743	Non-Muslim Bumiputera	Baru Bian	PSB	Edwin Banta	PRS	Umpang Sampang	PKR					Henry Joseph Usau	IND				
Sarawak	P215	Kapit	45,210	Non-Muslim Bumiputera	Alexander Nanta Linggi	GPS (PBB)	Alexander Nanta Linggi	PBB	Khusyairy Pangkas Abdullah	PKR			Robert Saweng	PBDS						
Sarawak	P216	Hulu Rajang	43,438	Non-Muslim Bumiputera	Wilson Ugak Kumbong	GPS (PRS)	Wilson Ugak Kumbong	PRS	Abun Sui Anyit	PKR										
Sarawak	P217	Bintulu	113,599	Mixed	Tiong King Sing	GPS (PDP)	Tiong King Sing	PDP	Tony Chiew Chan Yew	DAP	Duke Janteng	BERSATU								
Sarawak	P218	Sibuti	58,522	Muslim Bumiputera	Lukanisman Awang Sauni	GPS (PBB)	Lukanisman Awang Sauni	PBB	Zolhaidah Suboh	PKR			Bobby William	PBDS						
Sarawak	P219	Miri	143,229	Mixed	Michael Teo Yu Keng	PH (PKR)	Jeffery Phang Siaw Foong	SUPP	Chiew Choon Man	PKR			Lawrance Lai	PSB						
Sarawak	P220	Baram	59,535	Non-Muslim Bumiputera	Anyi Ngau	GPS (PDP)	Anyi Ngau	PDP	Roland Engan	PKR					Wilfred Entika	IND				
Sarawak	P221	Limbang	41,999	Muslim Bumiputera	Hasbi Habibollah	GPS (PBB)	Hasbi Habibollah	PBB	Racha Balang	PKR										
Sarawak	P222	Lawas	33,655	Muslim Bumiputera	Henry Sum Agong	GPS (PBB)	Henry Sum Agong	PBB	Japar Suyut	PKR			Baru Bian	PSB						

== See also ==
- 2022 Malaysian general election
