= Klang (federal constituency) =

Federal constituency of Selangor, Malaysia

Klang (P110)
Selangor constituency

Federal constituency
- Legislature: Dewan Rakyat
- MP: Ganabatirau Veraman; PH
- Constituency created: 1958
- Constituency abolished: 1974
- Constituency re-created: 1986
- First contested: 1959
- Last contested: 2022

Demographics
- Population (2020): 297,387
- Electors (2023): 210,510
- Area (km²): 162
- Pop. density (per km²): 1,835.7

Klang is a federal constituency in Klang District, Selangor, Malaysia, that has been represented in the Dewan Rakyat since 1959.

The federal constituency was created in the 1958 redistribution and is mandated to return a single member to the Dewan Rakyat under the first past the post voting system.

== Demographics ==
Ethnic breakdown of Klang's electorate as of 2022
1. Chinese (52.6%)
2. Malay (26.8%)
3. Indian (18.2%)
4. Other ethnicities (2.34%)
Age breakdown of Klang's electorate as of 2022
1. 18-20 (5.58%)
2. 21-29 (18.4%)
3. 30-39 (19.2%)
4. 40-49 (18.4%)
5. 50-59 (16.1%)
6. 60-69 (13.2%)
7. 70-79 (6.67%)
8. 80-89 (1.95%)
9. above 90 (0.46%)
Gender breakdown of Klang's electorate as of 2022
1. Male (49.9%)
2. Female (50.1%)

== History ==
=== Polling districts ===
According to the federal gazette issued on 18 July 2023, the Klang constituency is divided into 56 polling districts.

State conatituency	Polling district	Code	Location
Bandar Baru Klang (N45)	Taman Eng Ann 1	110/45/01	SM (Persendirian) Kwang Hua
Bandar Baru Klang (N45)	Persiaran Sultan Ibrahim 2	110/45/02	Dewan Putera, SMK Tinggi Klang
Bandar Baru Klang (N45)	Bandar Klang	110/45/03	SK (1) Jalan Meru; SK (2) Jalan Meru
Bandar Baru Klang (N45)	Sungai Pinang Selatan	110/45/04	SM Pin Hwa
Bandar Baru Klang (N45)	Pasar Jawa	110/45/05	SM Pin Hwa
Bandar Baru Klang (N45)	Jalan Goh Hock Huat	110/45/06	SA Rakyat (KAFA Integrasi) Al-Falah
Bandar Baru Klang (N45)	Persiaran Sultan Ibrahim 1	110/45/07	SMK Tinggi Klang
Bandar Baru Klang (N45)	Taman Eng Ann 2	110/45/08	Dewan Serbaguna Taman Eng Ann
Bandar Baru Klang (N45)	Taman Berkeley	110/45/09	SK (1) Jalan Batu Tiga; SK (2) Jalan Batu Tiga
Bandar Baru Klang (N45)	Bandar Baru Klang	110/45/10	Sekolah Sri Acmar (Rendah)
Bandar Baru Klang (N45)	Bukit Kuda	110/45/11	SJK (C) Kong Hoe
Bandar Baru Klang (N45)	Kampung Batu Belah	110/45/12	SRA Batu Belah; SJK (T) Bandar Baru Bukit Rajah Klang
Bandar Baru Klang (N45)	Taman Klang	110/45/13	SK Batu Belah
Bandar Baru Klang (N45)	Jalan Meru	110/45/14	SJK (T) Jalan Meru
Bandar Baru Klang (N45)	Klang Kawasan 19	110/45/15	SRA Integrasi Tengku Ampuan Fatimah
Bandar Baru Klang (N45)	Taman Klang Utama 1	110/45/16	SK Taman Klang Utama
Bandar Baru Klang (N45)	Taman Klang Utama 2	110/45/17	SMK Taman Klang Utama
Bandar Baru Klang (N45)	Sungai Bertih Selatan	110/45/18	SK Telok Pulai Taman Bertek
Bandar Baru Klang (N45)	Sungai Bertih Utara	110/45/19	SMA Sultan Hisamuddin
Pelabuhan Klang (N46)	Kampung Pendamar	110/46/01	SK Kampung Pendamar
Pelabuhan Klang (N46)	Kampung Idaman	110/46/02	SK Kampung Idaman
Pelabuhan Klang (N46)	Jalan Padang	110/46/03	Padang Datuk Arumugam
Pelabuhan Klang (N46)	Kawasan Pelabuhan	110/46/04	SRA Taman Kem
Pelabuhan Klang (N46)	Jalan Kem	110/46/05	SK Pelabuhan Klang
Pelabuhan Klang (N46)	Teluk Gong Utara	110/46/06	SK Telok Gong Kampung Nelayan
Pelabuhan Klang (N46)	Pulau Indah Utara	110/46/07	SK Pulau Indah
Pelabuhan Klang (N46)	Pulau Indah Selatan	110/46/08	SRA Kampung Perigi Nenas
Pelabuhan Klang (N46)	Pandamaran Jaya Jalan 1–12	110/46/09	SK Pandamaran Jaya
Pelabuhan Klang (N46)	Teluk Gong Selatan	110/46/10	SA Rakyat Al-Mumtaz Masjid
Pelabuhan Klang (N46)	Pandamaran Jaya Jalan 13–100	110/46/11	SRA Pandamaran Jaya
Pelabuhan Klang (N46)	Seri Pendamar	110/46/12	SA Rakyat KAFA Integrasi Kampung Pendamar
Pelabuhan Klang (N46)	Pandamaran Jaya Apartment	110/46/13	SK Pandamaran Jaya
Pelabuhan Klang (N46)	Selat Selatan	110/46/14	Dewan Serbaguna Kampung Idaman
Pandamaran (N47)	Kompleks Sukan Pandamaran	110/47/01	SMK (P) Raja Zarina
Pandamaran (N47)	Kawasan Sekolah Cina 'B'	110/47/02	SJK (C) Pandamaran B
Pandamaran (N47)	Kawasan Sekolah Cina 'A'	110/47/03	SJK (C) Pandamaran A
Pandamaran (N47)	Pandamaran	110/47/04	SMK Tengku Ampuan Jemaah
Pandamaran (N47)	Jalan Tengku Badar Utara	110/47/05	SK St Anne's Convent
Pandamaran (N47)	Jalan Tengku Badar Selatan	110/47/06	SJK (C) Tshing Nian
Pandamaran (N47)	Jalan Kastam	110/47/07	SK Methodist
Pandamaran (N47)	Tengku Bendahara Azman	110/47/08	SK (1) Tengku Bendahara Azman; SK (2) Tengku Bendahara Azman
Pandamaran (N47)	Raja Lumu	110/47/09	SMK Raja Lumu
Pandamaran (N47)	Sungai Aur	110/47/10	SJK (T) Persiaran Raja Muda Musa (Jalan Watson)
Pandamaran (N47)	Teluk Pulai Utara	110/47/11	SK (P) Methodist
Pandamaran (N47)	Kampung Attap	110/47/12	SMK Perempuan Methodist
Pandamaran (N47)	Jalan Tengku Kelana	110/47/13	SMK Convent Klang
Pandamaran (N47)	Bukit Istana	110/47/14	SK Klang
Pandamaran (N47)	Simpang Tujuh	110/47/15	SM Hin Hua
Pandamaran (N47)	Taman Gembira 1	110/47/16	SK Taman Gembira
Pandamaran (N47)	Taman Selatan 1	110/47/17	SK (1) Simpang Lima; SK (2) Simpang Lima
Pandamaran (N47)	Teluk Gadung Besar	110/47/18	SMK Tengku Ampuan Rahimah
Pandamaran (N47)	Taman Chi Liung	110/47/19	SRA Taman Sri Andalas
Pandamaran (N47)	Teluk Pulai Selatan	110/47/20	SMK Methodist (ACS)
Pandamaran (N47)	Taman Selatan 2	110/47/21	Sekolah Khas Klang
Pandamaran (N47)	Taman Bayu Perdana	110/47/22	Kolej Vokasional Klang (SMT Klang)
Pandamaran (N47)	Taman Gembira 2	110/47/23	SA Rakyat KAFA Integrasi Nurul-Ain

=== Representation history ===
Members of Parliament for Klang
Parliament	No	Years	Member	Party	Vote Share
Constituency created from Selangor Barat
Parliament of the Federation of Malaya
1st	P074	1959–1963	V. Manickavasagam (மாணிக்கவாசகம் பிள்ளை)	Alliance (MIC)	8,394; 57.31%
Parliament of Malaysia
1st	P074	1963–1964	V. Manickavasagam (மாணிக்கவாசகம் பிள்ளை)	Alliance (MIC)	8,394; 57.31%
2nd	P074	1964–1969	V. Manickavasagam (மாணிக்கவாசகம் பிள்ளை)	Alliance (MIC)	14,027; 63.89%
		1969–1971	Parliament was suspended		
3rd	P074	1971–1973	V. Manickavasagam (மாணிக்கவாசகம் பிள்ளை)	Alliance (MIC)	11,257; 51.10%
3rd	P074	1973–1974	V. Manickavasagam (மாணிக்கவாசகம் பிள்ளை)	BN (MIC)	11,257; 51.10%
Constituency abolished, split into Pelabohan Kelang and Shah Alam
Constituency re-created from Pelabohan Kelang and Shah Alam
7th	P093	1986–1990	Ng Cheng Kiat (黄俊杰)	BN (MCA)	24,966; 47.92%
8th	P093	1990–1995	Fong Kui Lun (方贵伦)	GR (DAP)	31,413; 57.09%
9th	P100	1995–1999	Tan Yee Kew (陈仪侨)	BN (MCA)	28,984; 53.88%
10th	P100	1999–2004	Tan Yee Kew (陈仪侨)	BN (MCA)	30,201; 54.61%
11th	P110	2004–2008	Tan Yee Kew (陈仪侨)	BN (MCA)	32,138; 63.02%
12th	P110	2008–2013	Charles Anthony Santiago (சார்ல்ஸ் அந்தனி)	PR (DAP)	37,990; 65.19%
13th	P110	2013–2015	Charles Anthony Santiago (சார்ல்ஸ் அந்தனி)	PR (DAP)	53,719; 64.91%
13th	P110	2015–2018	Charles Anthony Santiago (சார்ல்ஸ் அந்தனி)	PH (DAP)	53,719; 64.91%
14th	P110	2018–2022	Charles Anthony Santiago (சார்ல்ஸ் அந்தனி)	PH (DAP)	98,279; 77.34%
15th	P110	2022–present	Ganabatirau Veraman (ணபதிராவ் வேராமன்)	PH (DAP)	115,539; 70.49%

=== State constituency ===
Parliamentary constituency	State constituency						
Parliamentary constituency	1955–59*	1959–1974	1974–1986	1986–1995	1995–2004	2004–2018	2018–present
Klang							Bandar Baru Klang
Klang					Bandar Klang		
Klang		Kampong Jawa					
Klang				Klang Bandar			
Klang						Kota Alam Shah	
Klang				Pandamaran		Pandamaran	
Klang					Pelabuhan Klang		
Klang		Port Swettenham					
Klang				Telok Gadong			

=== Historical boundaries ===
State Constituency	Area				
State Constituency	1959	1984	1994	2003	2018
Bandar Baru Klang					Bukit Raja; Jalan Meru; Jalan Tepi Sungai; Taman Eng Ann; Taman Klang Utama
Bandar Klang			Bukit Tinggi; Taman Bayu Perdana; Taman Chi Lung; Taman Eng Ann; Teluk Pulai		
Kampong Jawa	Jalan Kebun; Kampong Jawa; Pandamaran; Teluk Gedung; Teluk Gong				
Klang Bandar		Jalan Kapar; Jalan Meru; Taman Bukit Kuda; Taman Bunga Melor; Taman Eng Ann			
Kota Alam Shah				Kota Alam Shah; Taman Bayu Perdana; Taman Chi Lung; Taman Gembira; Teluk Pulai	
Pandamaran		Bandar Bestari; Pandamaran; Pulau Carey; Teluk Gadung Indah; Teluk Gong		Kampung Papan; Pandamaran; Raja Lumu; Raja Uda; Teluk Pulai	Pandamaran; Raja Lumu; Taman Bayu Perdana; Taman Chi Lung; Teluk Pulai
Pelabuhan Klang			Kampung Delek; Kampung Sungai Udang; Pulau Indah; Pulau Ketam; Teluk Pulai	Bandar Botanic; Bukit Tinggi; Pulau Indah; Teluk Gadung; Teluk Gong	Bandar Bestari; Kampung Indaman; Pulau Indah; Teluk Gadung; Teluk Gong
Port Swettenham	Kampung Delek; Pulau Carey; Pulau Indah; Pulau Ketam; Teluk Pulai				
Telok Gadong		Raja Uda; Taman Gembira; Taman Kampung Pandamaran Jaya; Teluk Gadung; Teluk Pulai			

=== Current state assembly members ===
No.	State Constituency	Member	Coalition (Party)
N45	Bandar Baru Klang	Quah Perng Fei	PH (DAP)
N46	Pelabuhan Klang	Azmizam Zaman Huri	PH (PKR)
N47	Pandamaran	Tony Leong Tuck Chee	PH (DAP)

=== Local governments & postcodes ===
No.	State Constituency	Local Government	Postcode
N45	Bandar Baru Klang	Klang City Council	41050, 41100, 41150, 41200, 41250, 41300, 41400 Klang; 42000 Port Klang; 42920 Pulau Indah
N46	Pelabuhan Klang	Klang City Council	41050, 41100, 41150, 41200, 41250, 41300, 41400 Klang; 42000 Port Klang; 42920 Pulau Indah
N47	Pandamaran	Klang City Council	41050, 41100, 41150, 41200, 41250, 41300, 41400 Klang; 42000 Port Klang; 42920 Pulau Indah

== Election results ==
Malaysian general election, 2022
Party	Candidate	Votes	%	∆%
PH	Ganabatirau Veraman	115,539	70.49	▲70.49
PN	Jaya Chandran Perumal	23,738	14.48	▲14.48
BN	Tee Hooi Ling	19,762	12.06	▼3.29
Independent	Hedrhin Ramli @ Awin	3,016	1.84	▲1.84
Heritage	Loo Cheng Wee	1,140	0.70	▲0.70
Independent	Deepak Jaikishan	439	0.27	▲0.27
Parti Rakyat Malaysia	Chandra Sivarajan	271	0.17	▲0.17
Total valid votes		163,905	100.00	
Total rejected ballots		1,374		
Unreturned ballots		275		
Turnout		165,554	78.46	▼7.60
Registered electors		208,913		
Majority		91,801	56.01	▼5.98
PH hold		Swing		
Source(s) https://lom.agc.gov.my/ilims/upload/portal/akta/outputp/1753283/PUB612.pdf

Malaysian general election, 2018
Party	Candidate	Votes	%	∆%
PKR	Charles Anthony Santiago	98,279	77.34	▲77.34
BN	Ching Eu Boon	19,506	15.35	▼19.74
PAS	Khairul Shah Abdullah	9,169	7.22	▲7.22
Independent	Puvananderan Ganasamoorthy	120	0.09	▲0.09
Total valid votes		127,074	100.00	
Total rejected ballots		1,204		
Unreturned ballots		258		
Turnout		128,536	86.06	▼0.70
Registered electors		149,348		
Majority		78,773	61.99	▲32.17
PKR hold		Swing		
Source(s) "His Majesty's Government Gazette - Notice of Contested Election, Parliament for the State of Selangor [P.U. (B) 239/2018]" (PDF). Attorney General's Chambers of Malaysia. 3 May 2018. Archived from the original (PDF) on 2019-07-19. "Federal Government Gazette - Results of Contested Election and Statements of the Poll after the Official Addition of Votes, Parliamentary Constituencies for the State of Selangor [P.U. (B) 313/2018]" (PDF). Attorney General's Chambers of Malaysia. 28 May 2018. Archived from the original (PDF) on 2019-07-19.

Malaysian general election, 2013
Party	Candidate	Votes	%	∆%
DAP	Charles Anthony Santiago	53,719	64.91	▼0.28
BN	Teh Kim Poo	29,034	35.09	▲0.28
Total valid votes		82,753	100.00	
Total rejected ballots		1,342		
Unreturned ballots		124		
Turnout		84,219	86.76	▲10.53
Registered electors		97,073		
Majority		24,685	29.82	▼0.56
DAP hold		Swing		
Source(s) "Federal Government Gazette - Notice of Contested Election, Parliament for the State of Selangor [P.U. (B) 176/2013]" (PDF). Attorney General's Chambers of Malaysia. 26 April 2013. Archived from the original (PDF) on 2018-09-30. "Federal Government Gazette - Results of Contested Election and Statements of the Poll after the Official Addition of Votes, Parliamentary Constituencies for the State of Selangor [P.U. (B) 217/2013]" (PDF). Attorney General's Chambers of Malaysia. 22 May 2013. Archived from the original (PDF) on 2018-09-30.

Malaysian general election, 2008
Party	Candidate	Votes	%	∆%
DAP	Charles Anthony Santiago	37,990	65.19	▲28.21
BN	Ch'ng Toh Eng	20,289	34.81	▼28.21
Total valid votes		58,279	100.00	
Total rejected ballots		1,036		
Unreturned ballots		8		
Turnout		59,323	76.23	▲5.66
Registered electors		77,816		
Majority		17,701	30.38	▲4.34
DAP gain from BN		Swing		?

Malaysian general election, 2004
Party	Candidate	Votes	%	∆%
BN	Tan Yee Kew	32,138	63.02	▲8.41
DAP	Wong Ah Peng	18,857	36.98	▼7.38
Total valid votes		50,995	100.00	
Total rejected ballots		1,215		
Unreturned ballots		55		
Turnout		52,265	70.57	▲0.76
Registered electors		74,062		
Majority		13,281	26.04	▲15.79
BN hold		Swing		

Malaysian general election, 1999
Party	Candidate	Votes	%	∆%
BN	Tan Yee Kew	30,201	54.61	▲0.73
DAP	Teng Chang Khim	24,528	44.36	▲1.86
MDP	Tan Siow Eng	570	1.03	▲1.03
Total valid votes		55,299	100.00	
Total rejected ballots		956		
Unreturned ballots		70		
Turnout		56,325	69.81	▼7.06
Registered electors		80,673		
Majority		5,673	10.25	▲1.13
BN hold		Swing		

Malaysian general election, 1995
Party	Candidate	Votes	%	∆%
BN	Tan Yee Kew	28,984	53.88	▲10.97
DAP	Fong Kui Lun	22,860	42.50	▼14.59
PAS	Mohd Yusof Jasmin	1,947	3.62	▲3.62
Total valid votes		53,791	100.00	
Total rejected ballots		841		
Unreturned ballots		92		
Turnout		54,724	76.87	▲7.38
Registered electors		77,188		
Majority		6,124	11.38	▼2.80
BN gain from DAP		Swing		?

Malaysian general election, 1990
Party	Candidate	Votes	%	∆%
DAP	Fong Kui Lun	31,413	57.09	▲10.46
BN	Chan Tee Yuen	23,606	42.91	▲5.01
Total valid votes		55,019	100.00	
Total rejected ballots		1,172		
Unreturned ballots		0		
Turnout		56,191	69.49	▼1.25
Registered electors		80,860		
Majority		7,807	14.18	▲12.89
DAP gain from BN		Swing		?

Malaysian general election, 1986
Party	Candidate	Votes	%	∆%
BN	Ng Cheng Kiat	24,966	47.92	▲47.92
DAP	Wee Choo Keong	24,299	46.63	▲46.63
PAS	Azmi Ali @ Nik	2,317	4.45	▲4.45
SDP	Gabriel Lee	519	1.00	
Total valid votes		52,101	100.00	
Total rejected ballots		925		
Unreturned ballots		0		
Turnout		53,026	70.74	
Registered electors		74,964		
Majority		667	1.29	
BN gain from Alliance Party (Malaysia) Party (Malaysia)		Swing		?

Malaysian general election, 1969
Party	Candidate	Votes	%	∆%
Alliance	V. Manickavasagam	11,257	51.10	▼12.79
DAP	Lee Lam Thye	10,772	48.90	▲48.90
Total valid votes		22,029	100.00	
Total rejected ballots		970		
Unreturned ballots		0		
Turnout		22,999	67.18	▼9.03
Registered electors		34,235		
Majority		485	2.20	▼25.58
Alliance hold		Swing		

Malaysian general election, 1964
Party	Candidate	Votes	%	∆%
Alliance	V. Manickavasagam	14,027	63.89	▲6.58
Socialist Front	S. S. Nayagam	7,928	36.11	▼6.58
Total valid votes		21,955	100.00	
Total rejected ballots		1,029		
Unreturned ballots		0		
Turnout		22,984	76.21	▲0.69
Registered electors		30,158		
Majority		6,099	27.78	▲13.16
Alliance hold		Swing		

Malayan general election, 1959
Party	Candidate	Votes	%
Alliance	V. Manickavasagam	8,394	57.31
Socialist Front	S. S. Nayagam	6,253	42.69
Total valid votes		14,647	100.00
Total rejected ballots		207	
Unreturned ballots		0	
Turnout		14,854	75.52
Registered electors		19,670	
Majority		2,141	14.62
This was a new constituency created.
