= Fong Kui Lun =

Malaysian politician

Yang Berhormat Tuan Fong Kui Lun MP
- 方贵伦

Member of the Malaysian Parliament for Bukit Bintang
- Incumbent
- Assumed office 29 November 1999
- Preceded by: Lee Chong Meng (BN–MCA)
- Majority: 1,134 (1999); 304 (2004); 14,277 (2008); 19,399 (2013); 37,260 (2018); 38,977 (2022)

Member of the Malaysian Parliament for Klang
- In office 21 October 1990 – 25 April 1995
- Preceded by: Ng Cheng Kiat (BN–MCA)
- Succeeded by: Tan Yee Kew (BN–MCA)
- Majority: 7,807 (1990)

Personal details
- Born: Fong Kui Lun; 28 September 1946 (age 80) Selangor, Malayan Union (now Malaysia)
- Party: Democratic Action Party (DAP) (1968–present)
- Other political affiliations: Gagasan Rakyat (GR) (1990–1995); Barisan Alternatif (BA) (1999–2004); Pakatan Rakyat (PR) (2008–2015); Pakatan Harapan (PH) (since 2015)
- Education: Sekolah Jenis Kebangsaan (C) Sungai Besi; SMJK Katholik
- Occupation: Politician
- Website: fongkuilun.blogspot.com

Fong Kui Lun

Chinese name
- Traditional Chinese: 方貴倫
- Simplified Chinese: 方贵伦
Transcriptions
Standard Mandarin
- Hanyu Pinyin: Fāng Guìlún
Hakka
- Pha̍k-fa-sṳ: Fông Kui-lùn
Yue: Cantonese
- Jyutping: Fong1 Gwai3 Leon4
Southern Min
- Hokkien POJ: Png Kùi-lûn
- Tâi-lô: Png Kuì-lûn

Fong Kui Lun (simplified Chinese: 方贵伦; traditional Chinese: 方貴倫; pinyin: Fāng Guìlún; Jyutping: Fong1 Gwai3 Leon4; Pe̍h-ōe-jī: Png Kùi-lûn; Pha̍k-fa-sṳ: Fông Kui-lùn; born 28 September 1946) is a Malaysian politician who has served as the Member of Parliament (MP) for Bukit Bintang since November 1999 and Klang from October 1990 to April 1995. He is a member of Democratic Action Party (DAP), a component party of the Pakatan Harapan (PH) and formerly Pakatan Rakyat (PR), Barisan Alternatif (BA) as well as Gagasan Rakyat (GR) coalitions. He also served as the National Treasurer of DAP from 1999 to 2025. He is also presently the oldest MP at the age of 78.

Fong was first elected to Parliament in the 1990 general election as the Klang MP. He was not reelected and lost the seat in the 1995 general election to Tan Yee Kew of the Barisan Nasional (BN). He returned to Parliament in 1999 general election, winning the seat of Bukit Bintang, and became the DAP's treasurer in the same year. He was re-elected to Parliament in the consecutive 2004, 2008, 2013, 2018 and 2022 general elections.

In 2012, Fong apprehended a snatch thief attempting to escape in Pudu, Kuala Lumpur.

== Election results ==
Selangor State Legislative Assembly
Year	Constituency	Candidate	Votes	Pct	Opponent(s)	Votes	Pct	Ballots cast	Majority	Turnout
1982	N27 Serdang	Fong Kui Lun (DAP)	5,687	36.83%	Yap Pian Hon (MCA)	9,753	63.17%	15,900	4,066	77.61%

Parliament of Malaysia
Year	Constituency	Candidate	Votes	Pct	Opponent(s)	Votes	Pct	Ballots cast	Majority	Turnout
1990	P093 Klang	Fong Kui Lun (DAP)	31,413	55.90%	Chan Tee Yuen (MCA)	23,606	42.01%	56,191	7,807	69.49%
1995	P100 Klang	Fong Kui Lun (DAP)	22,860	41.77%	Tan Yee Kew (MCA)	28,984	52.96%	54,724	6,124	76.87%
1995	P100 Klang	Fong Kui Lun (DAP)	22,860	41.77%	Mohd Yusof Jasmin (PAS)	1,947	3.56%	54,724	6,124	76.87%
1999	P108 Bukit Bintang	Fong Kui Lun (DAP)	19,115	49.52%	Lee Chong Meng (MCA)	17,981	46.58%	39,333	1,134	62.57%
1999	P108 Bukit Bintang	Fong Kui Lun (DAP)	19,115	49.52%	Billi Lim Peng Soon (IND)	198	0.51%	39,333	1,134	62.57%
2004	P120 Bukit Bintang	Fong Kui Lun (DAP)	19,103	48.44%	Tan Chew Mooi (MCA)	18,799	47.67%	39,938	304	61.34%
2004	P120 Bukit Bintang	Fong Kui Lun (DAP)	19,103	48.44%	Wee Choo Keong (MDP)	1,107	2.81%	39,938	304	61.34%
2004	P120 Bukit Bintang	Fong Kui Lun (DAP)	19,103	48.44%	Billi Lim Peng Soon (IND)	132	0.33%	39,938	304	61.34%
2008	P120 Bukit Bintang	Fong Kui Lun (DAP)	26,811	67.07%	Lee Chong Meng (MCA)	12,534	31.35%	40,441	14,277	67.42%
2013	P120 Bukit Bintang	Fong Kui Lun (DAP)	30,408	73.33%	Frankie Gan Joon Zin (MCA)	11,009	26.55%	41,824	19,399	75.06%
2018	P120 Bukit Bintang	Fong Kui Lun (DAP)	44,516	84.94%	Ann Tan Ean Ean (MCA)	7,256	13.85%	52,765	37,260	75.89%
2018	P120 Bukit Bintang	Fong Kui Lun (DAP)	44,516	84.94%	Khairul Husni Othman (PFP)	636	1.21%	52,765	37,260	75.89%
2022	P120 Bukit Bintang	Fong Kui Lun (DAP)	43,827	82.79%	Tan Teik Peng (MCA)	4,850	9.16%	52,936	38,977	66.35%
2022	P120 Bukit Bintang	Fong Kui Lun (DAP)	43,827	82.79%	Chen Win Keong (BERSATU)	4,259	8.05%	52,936	38,977	66.35%

== Honours ==
=== Honours of Malaysia ===
- Malaysia
  - Recipient of the 17th Yang di-Pertuan Agong Installation Medal (2024)

Parliament of Malaysia
Preceded by Lee Chong Meng	Member of Parliament for Bukit Bintang; 20 December 1999–present	Incumbent
