= Tan Yee Kew =

Malaysian politician

Yang Berbahagia Datin Paduka Tan Yee Kew DSSA
- 陈仪乔

Member of the Malaysian Parliament for Wangsa Maju
- In office 9 May 2018 – 19 November 2022
- Preceded by: Tan Kee Kwong (PR–PKR)
- Succeeded by: Zahir Hassan (PH–PKR)
- Majority: 24,238 (2018)

Member of the Malaysian Parliament for Klang
- In office 25 April 1995 – 8 March 2008
- Preceded by: Fong Kui Lun (GR–DAP)
- Succeeded by: Charles Anthony Santiago (PR–DAP)
- Majority: 6,124 (1995); 5,673 (1999; 13,281 (2004)

Parliamentary Secretary of International Trade and Industry
- In office 27 March 2004 – 8 March 2008
- Monarchs: Sirajuddin (2004–2005); Mizan Zainal Abidin (2006–2008)
- Prime Minister: Abdullah Ahmad Badawi
- Minister: Rafidah Aziz

Personal details
- Born: Tan Yee Kew; 14 February 1953 (age 73) Klang, Selangor, Federation of Malaya (now Malaysia)
- Citizenship: Malaysian
- Party: Malaysian Chinese Association (MCA) (1986–2008); People's Justice Party (PKR) (since 2008)
- Other political affiliations: Barisan Nasional (BN) (1986–2008); Pakatan Rakyat (PR) (2008–2015); Pakatan Harapan (PH) (since 2015)
- Website: Tan Yee Kew on Parliament of Malaysia
- Tan Yee Kew on Facebook

Tan Yee Kew (simplified Chinese: 陈仪乔; traditional Chinese: 陳儀喬; pinyin: Chén Yíqiáo; Cantonese Yale: Chàhn Yìh-kìuh; Pe̍h-ōe-jī: Tân Gî-kiâu) (born 1953) is a Malaysian politician who served as the Member of Parliament (MP) for Wangsa Maju from May 2018 to November 2022, for Klang from April 1995 to March 2008 and Parliamentary Secretary of International Trade and Industry from March 2004 to March 2008. She is a member and Chairperson of the Disciplinary Board of the People's Justice Party (PKR), a component party of the Pakatan Harapan (PH) coalition and was a member of the Malaysian Chinese Association (MCA), a component party of the Barisan Nasional (BN) coalition. She was also the Treasurer of PKR before 2018, Deputy Women Chief of MCA from 1996 to 2005, State Women Chief of MCA of Selangor and Member of the Central Committee of MCA.

== Political career ==
Tan joined MCA in 1986.

Tan was also the Director of the Port Klang Authority from 1998 to 2001, before she was appointed as the Parliamentary secretary of Ministry of International Trade and Industry in 2004.

Anyhow, Tan was censured for violating party discipline, and her party membership was suspended for 6 months in 2005. She was dropped as a candidate of 2008 general election, during which MCA and BN suffered a great loss in Selangor. Tan quit MCA on 17 July 2008 and joined PKR with more than a thousand followers.

During the 2013 general election, Tan contested as PKR candidate for the parliamentary seat of Tanjong Malim in Perak, against MCA's Ong Ka Chuan, the Deputy Minister of International Trade and Industry, but she lost by 4,328 votes.

In 2018 general election, Tan moved to Wangsa Maju in Kuala Lumpur, and defeated Yew Teong Look, the candidate of MCA, with 24,238 votes majority.

== Election results ==
Parliament of Malaysia
Year	Constituency	Candidate	Votes	Pct	Opponent(s)	Votes	Pct	Ballots cast	Majority	Turnout
1990	P091 Puchong	Tan Yee Kew (MCA)	32,686	48.31%	V. David (DAP)	34,967	51.69%	68,684	2,281	69.57%
1995	P100 Klang	Tan Yee Kew (MCA)	28,984	52.96%	Fong Kui Lun (DAP)	22,860	41.77%	54,724	6,124	76.87%
1995	P100 Klang	Tan Yee Kew (MCA)	28,984	52.96%	Mohd Yusof Jasmin (PAS)	1,947	3.56%	54,724	6,124	76.87%
1999	P100 Klang	Tan Yee Kew (MCA)	30,201	54.61%	Teng Chang Khim (DAP)	24,528	44.36%	56,325	5,673	69.81%
1999	P100 Klang	Tan Yee Kew (MCA)	30,201	54.61%	Tan Siow Eng (MDP)	570	1.03%	56,325	5,673	69.81%
2004	P110 Klang	Tan Yee Kew (MCA)	32,138	63.02%	Wong Ah Peng (DAP)	18,857	36.98%	52,265	13,281	70.57%
2013	P077 Tanjong Malim	Tan Yee Kew (PKR)	23,897	44.75%	Ong Ka Chuan (MCA)	28,225	52.86%	53,399	4,328	82.80%
2018	P116 Wangsa Maju	Tan Yee Kew (PKR)	42,178	57.30%	Yew Teong Look (MCA)	17,940	24.37%	74,509	24,238	84.21%
2018	P116 Wangsa Maju	Tan Yee Kew (PKR)	42,178	57.30%	Razali Tumirin (PAS)	13,490	18.33%	74,509	24,238	84.21%

== Honours ==
=== Honours of Malaysia ===
- Selangor
  - Knight Companion of the Order of Sultan Salahuddin Abdul Aziz Shah (DSSA) – Datin Paduka (2000)

Parliament of Malaysia
Preceded by Tan Kee Kwong	Member of Parliament for Wangsa Maju; 10 May 2018–present	Incumbent
Preceded by Fong Kui Lun	Member of Parliament for Klang; 7 June 1995–13 February 2008	Succeeded by Charles Anthony Santiago
