= Wangsa Maju (federal constituency) =

Federal constituency of Kuala Lumpur, Malaysia

Wangsa Maju (P116)
Kuala Lumpur constituency

Federal constituency
- Legislature: Dewan Rakyat
- MP: Zahir Hassan; PH
- Constituency created: 1994
- First contested: 1995
- Last contested: 2022

Demographics
- Population (2020): 215,600
- Electors (2022): 120,323
- Area (km²): 16
- Pop. density (per km²): 13,475

Wangsa Maju is a federal constituency in the Federal Territory of Kuala Lumpur, Malaysia, that has been represented in the Dewan Rakyat since 1995.

The federal constituency was created in the 1994 redistribution and is mandated to return a single member to the Dewan Rakyat under the first past the post voting system.

With over 13,000 people per km^{2}, Wangsa Maju has the highest population density among all parliamentary constituencies in Malaysia.

== Demographics ==
https://live.chinapress.com.my/ge15/parliament/KUALALUMPUR

Ethnic breakdown of Wangsa Maju's electorate as of 2022
1. Malay (61.8%)
2. Chinese (28.5%)
3. Indian (8.40%)
4. Other ethnicities (1.20%)
Age breakdown of Wangsa Maju's electorate as of 2022
1. 18-20 (5.14%)
2. 21-29 (19.4%)
3. 30-39 (24.1%)
4. 40-49 (17.8%)
5. 50-59 (14.7%)
6. 60-69 (12.5%)
7. 70-79 (4.96%)
8. 80-89 (1.31%)
9. above 90 (0.21%)
Gender breakdown of Wangsa Maju's electorate as of 2022
1. Male (49.4%)
2. Female (50.6%)

== History ==
=== Polling districts ===
According to the gazette issued on 31 October 2022, the Wangsa Maju constituency has a total of 21 polling districts.

Polling District	Code	Location
Flat Taman Melati	116/00/01	SMK Taman Melati
Taman Melati	116/00/02	SK Taman Melati
Rumah Pangsa Dewan Bandaraya	116/00/03	SK Setapak Indah
Taman Ibu Kota	116/00/04	SMK Setapak Indah
Taman Setapak	116/00/05	SMK Danau Kota
Gombak Utara	116/00/06	SJK (C) Nan Yik 'Lee Rubber'
Changkat	116/00/07	SRA Ibnul Jauzi (SEA Daruttarbiah Islamiah)
Kampung Padang Balang	116/00/08	SRA Saidina Ali (K.W), Kampung Padang Balang
Gombak Selatan	116/00/09	SMJK Chong Hwa
Kampung Puah	116/00/10	SRA Bilal Bin Rabah (SRA Kampung Puah)
Taman P Ramlee	116/00/11	SJK (C) Mun Yee
Jalan Gombak	116/00/12	SRA Zaid Bin Harithah (SRA Sungai Mulia)
Teratai Mewah	116/00/13	SK Danau Kota 2
Danau Kota	116/00/14	SK Danau Kota
Genting Kelang	116/00/15	Kolej Universiti Tuanku Abdul Rahman
Seksyen 1 Wangsa Maju Utara	116/00/16	SK Wangsa Maju Seksyen 1
Seksyen 1 Wangsa Maju Selatan	116/00/17	SMK Zon R1 Wangsa Maju; Gelanggang Terbuka Sekolah Mengah Kebangsaan Pendidikan Khas Setapak
Taman Desa Setapak	116/00/18	SK Desa Setapak
Seksyen 2 Wangsa Maju	116/00/19	SMK Wangsa Maju 2
Seksyen 4 Wangsa Maju	116/00/20	SK Wangsa Jaya
Taman Wangsa Melawati	116/00/21	SMK Wangsa Melawati

=== Representation history ===
Members of Parliament for Wangsa Maju
Parliament	No	Years	Member	Party	Vote Share
Constituency created from Batu and Titiwangsa
9th	P105	1995–1999	Kamal Salih (كمال مت صالح)	BN (UMNO)	35,884; 81.79%
10th	P105	1999–2004	Zulhasnan Rafique (ذوالحسنان رفيق)	BN (UMNO)	29,997; 55.17%
11th	P116	2004–2008	Yew Teong Look (姚长禄)	BN (MCA)	23,135; 64.11%
12th	P116	2008–2010	Wee Choo Keong (黄朱强)	PR (PKR)	19,637; 50.19%
12th	P116	2010–2013	Wee Choo Keong (黄朱强)	Independent	19,637; 50.19%
13th	P116	2013–2015	Tan Kee Kwong (陈记光)	PR (PKR)	31,641; 54.77%
13th	P116	2015–2018	Tan Kee Kwong (陈记光)	PH (PKR)	31,641; 54.77%
14th	P116	2018–2022	Tan Yee Kew (陈仪侨)	PH (PKR)	42,178; 57.30%
15th	P116	2022–present	Zahir Hassan (ظاهير حسن)	PH (PKR)	46,031; 49.63%

=== Historical boundaries ===
Federal constituency	Area		
Federal constituency	1994	2003	2018
Wangsa Maju	Danau Kota; Setiawangsa; Taman Melati; Wangsa Maju; Wangsa Melawati	Danau Kota; Kampung Puah; Taman Melati; Wangsa Maju; Wangsa Melawati	Danau Kota; Kampung Padang Balang; Taman Changkat Desa; Taman Melati; Wangsa Maju

=== Local governments & postcodes ===
No.	Local Government	Postcode
P116	Kuala Lumpur City Hall	68100 Batu Caves; 51000, 53000, 53100 Kuala Lumpur

== Election results ==
Malaysian general election, 2022
Party	Candidate	Votes	%	∆%
PH	Zahir Hassan	46,031	49.63	▲49.63
PN	Nuridah Mohd Salleh	25,335	27.32	▲27.32
BN	Mohd Shafei Abdullah	19,595	21.13	▼3.24
PEJUANG	Norzaila Arifin	987	1.06	▲1.06
Heritage	Wee Choo Keong	576	0.62	▲0.62
Independent	Raveentheran Suntheralingam	216	0.23	▲0.23
Total valid votes		92,740	100.00	
Total rejected ballots		498		
Unreturned ballots		255		
Turnout		93,493	77.08	▼7.13
Registered electors		120,323		
Majority		20,696	22.31	▼10.62
PH hold		Swing		
Source(s) https://lom.agc.gov.my/ilims/upload/portal/akta/outputp/1753271/PUB%20613%20(2022)%20-%20PARLIMEN%20WP%20KUALA%20LUMPUR.pdf

Malaysian general election, 2018
Party	Candidate	Votes	%	∆%
PKR	Tan Yee Kew	42,178	57.30	▲2.53
BN	Yew Teong Look	17,940	24.37	▼20.86
PAS	Razali Tumirin	13,490	18.33	▲18.33
Total valid votes		73,608	100.00	
Total rejected ballots		525		
Unreturned ballots		376		
Turnout		74,509	84.21	▼1.80
Registered electors		88,482		
Majority		24,238	32.93	▲23.39
PKR hold		Swing		
Source(s) "His Majesty's Government Gazette - Notice of Contested Election, Parliament for the Federal Territory of Kuala Lumpur [P.U. (B) 240/2018]" (PDF). Attorney General's Chambers of Malaysia. 3 May 2018. "Federal Government Gazette - Results of Contested Election and Statements of the Poll after the Official Addition of Votes, Parliamentary Constituencies for the Federal Territory of Kuala Lumpur [P.U. (B) 314/2018]" (PDF). Attorney General's Chambers of Malaysia. 28 May 2018.

Malaysian general election, 2013
Party	Candidate	Votes	%	∆%
PKR	Tan Kee Kwong	31,641	54.77	▲4.58
BN	Mohd Shafei Abdullah	26,130	45.23	▼4.58
Total valid votes		57,771	100.00	
Total rejected ballots		375		
Unreturned ballots		145		
Turnout		58,291	86.01	▲13.00
Registered electors		67,775		
Majority		5,511	9.54	▲9.16
PKR hold		Swing		
Source(s) "Federal Government Gazette - Notice of Contested Election, Parliament for the Federal Territory of Kuala Lumpur [P.U. (B) 177/2013]" (PDF). Attorney General's Chambers of Malaysia. 26 April 2013. Archived from the original (PDF) on 2018-10-02. "Federal Government Gazette - Results of Contested Election and Statements of the Poll after the Official Addition of Votes, Parliamentary Constituencies for the Federal Territory of Kuala Lumpur [P.U. (B) 218/2013]" (PDF). Attorney General's Chambers of Malaysia. 22 May 2013. Archived from the original (PDF) on 2018-10-02.

Malaysian general election, 2008
Party	Candidate	Votes	%	∆%
PKR	Wee Choo Keong	19,637	50.19	▲14.30
BN	Yew Teong Lock	19,487	49.81	▼14.30
Total valid votes		39,124	100.00	
Total rejected ballots		357		
Unreturned ballots		317		
Turnout		39,798	73.01	▼0.50
Registered electors		54,509		
Majority		150	0.38	▼27.84
PKR gain from BN		Swing		?

Malaysian general election, 2004
Party	Candidate	Votes	%	∆%
BN	Yew Teong Lock	23,135	64.11	▲8.94
PKR	Sahri Bahari	12,950	35.89	▼8.94
Total valid votes		36,085	100.00	
Total rejected ballots		340		
Unreturned ballots		829		
Turnout		37,254	73.51	▼5.87
Registered electors		50,682		
Majority		10,185	28.22	▲17.88
BN hold		Swing		

Malaysian general election, 1999
Party	Candidate	Votes	%	∆%
BN	Zulhasnan Rafique	29,997	55.17	▼26.62
PKR	Marina Mohd. Yusoff	24,379	44.83	▲44.83
Total valid votes		54,376	100.00	
Total rejected ballots		710		
Unreturned ballots		4,523		
Turnout		59,609	79.38	▲4.65
Registered electors		75,087		
Majority		5,618	10.34	▼53.24
BN hold		Swing		

Malaysian general election, 1995
Party	Candidate	Votes	%
BN	Kamal Salih	35,884	81.79
S46	Aliah @ Nailah Nani	7,990	18.21
Total valid votes		43,874	100.00
Total rejected ballots		1,704	
Unreturned ballots		3,147	
Turnout		48,725	74.73
Registered electors		65,199	
Majority		27,894	63.58
This was a new constituency created.
