= Zahir Hassan =

Malaysian politician (born 1959)

Yang Berhormat Tuan Zahir Hassan MP
- ظَاهِر حَسَّان

Chief Organising Secretary of the People's Justice Party
- Incumbent
- Assumed office 20 July 2022
- President: Anwar Ibrahim
- Preceded by: Nik Nazmi Nik Ahmad

Member of the Malaysian Parliament for Wangsa Maju
- Incumbent
- Assumed office 19 November 2022
- Preceded by: Tan Yee Kew (PH–PKR)
- Majority: 20,696 (2022)

Personal details
- Born: Zahir bin Hassan; 24 March 1959 (age 67) Johor Bahru, Johor, Federation of Malaya (now Malaysia)
- Party: People's Justice Party (PKR) (since 1999)
- Other political affiliations: Pakatan Rakyat (PR) (2008–2015); Pakatan Harapan (PH) (since 2015)
- Education: University of Bolton; MJIIT/Universiti Teknologi Malaysia
- Occupation: Politician
- Profession: Professional Engineer & Professional Technologist

Zahir bin Hassan (born 24 March 1959) is a Malaysian politician who has served as the Member of Parliament (MP) for Wangsa Maju since November 2022. He is a member and was the Chairman of the Federal Territories of the People's Justice Party (PKR), a component party of the Pakatan Harapan (PH) and formerly the Pakatan Rakyat (PR) coalitions. He has served as the Chief Organising Secretary of PKR since July 2022.

== Election results ==
Selangor State Legislative Assembly
Year	Constituency	Candidate	Votes	Pct	Opponent(s)	Votes	Pct	Ballots cast	Majority	Turnout
2004	N19 Bukit Antarabangsa	Zahir Hassan (PKR)	7,029	32.05%	Azman Wahid (UMNO)	14,900	67.95%	22,197	7,871	71.99%

Parliament of Malaysia
Year	Constituency	Candidate	Votes	Pct	Opponent(s)	Votes	Pct	Ballots cast	Majority	Turnout
2022	P116 Wangsa Maju	Zahir Hassan (PKR)	46,031	49.63%	Nuridah Mohd Salleh (PAS)	25,335	27.32%	93,493	20,696	77.08%
2022	P116 Wangsa Maju	Zahir Hassan (PKR)	46,031	49.63%	Mohd Shafei Abdullah (UMNO)	19,595	21.13%	93,493	20,696	77.08%
2022	P116 Wangsa Maju	Zahir Hassan (PKR)	46,031	49.63%	Norzaila Arifin (PEJUANG)	987	1.06%	93,493	20,696	77.08%
2022	P116 Wangsa Maju	Zahir Hassan (PKR)	46,031	49.63%	Wee Choo Keong (WARISAN)	576	0.62%	93,493	20,696	77.08%
2022	P116 Wangsa Maju	Zahir Hassan (PKR)	46,031	49.63%	Raveentheran Suntheralingam (IND)	216	0.23%	93,493	20,696	77.08%

== Honours ==
=== Honours of Malaysia ===
- Malaysia
  - Recipient of the 17th Yang di-Pertuan Agong Installation Medal (2024)
