= Nuridah Mohd Salleh =

Malaysian politician

Nuridah Mohd Salleh JMN
- نورعدة محمد صالح
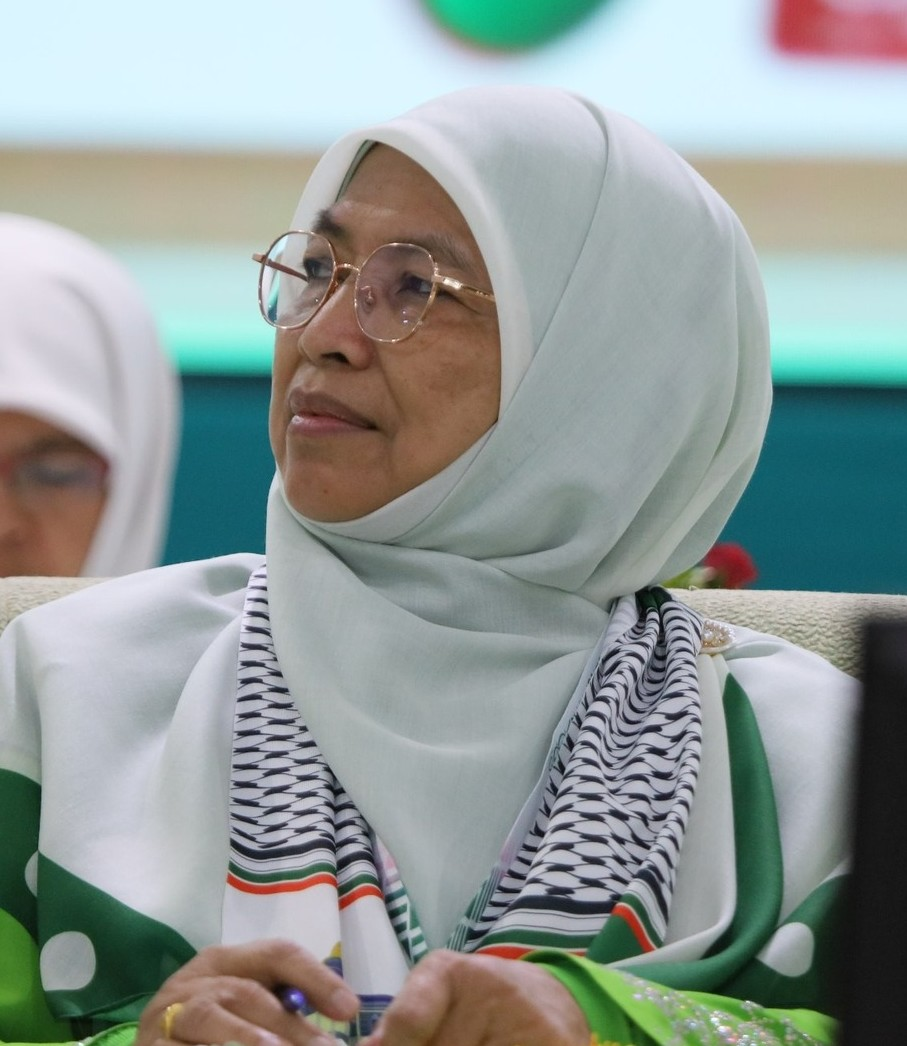

Senator Elected by the Terengganu State Legislative Assembly
- In office 29 November 2018 – 5 November 2022 Serving with Husain Awang
- Monarchs: Muhammad V (2018–2019); Abdullah (2019–2022)
- Prime Minister: Mahathir Mohamad (2018–2020); Muhyiddin Yassin (2020–2021); Ismail Sabri Yaakob (2021–2022)
- Preceded by: Engku Naimah Engku Taib
- Succeeded by: Hussin Ismail

Dewan Muslimat Chief of the Malaysian Islamic Party
- Incumbent
- Assumed office 2015
- President: Abdul Hadi Awang
- Deputy: Rosni Adam
- Preceded by: Siti Zailah Mohd Yusoff
- In office 2007–2011
- President: Abdul Hadi Awang
- Deputy: Siti Zailah Mohd Yusoff
- Preceded by: Azizah Khatib Mat
- Succeeded by: Siti Zailah Mohd Yusoff

Faction represented in Dewan Negara
- 2018–2020: Malaysian Islamic Party
- 2020–2022: Perikatan Nasional

Personal details
- Born: Nuridah binti Mohd Salleh; 20 May 1961 (age 64) Pekan, Pahang
- Citizenship: Malaysia
- Party: Malaysian Islamic Party (PAS)
- Other political affiliations: Pakatan Rakyat (PR) (2007–2015); Gagasan Sejahtera (GS) (2016–2020); Perikatan Nasional (PN) (since 2020)
- Spouse: Mohd Azemi Azman Johari
- Children: 10
- Education: Sultan Alam Shah Islamic College
- Alma mater: International Islamic University of Malaysia; University of Malaya
- Occupation: Politician
- Profession: Teacher

Nuridah binti Mohd Salleh is a Malaysian politician and teacher who served as a Senator from 2018 to 2022 and Dewan Muslimat PAS Chief from 2007 to 2011 and since 2015.

== Election results ==
Parliament of Malaysia
Year	Constituency	Candidate	Votes	Pct	Opponent(s)	Votes	Pct	Ballots cast	Majority	Turnout
2013	P091 Rompin	Nuridah Mohd Salleh (PAS)	14,926	33.2%	Jamaluddin Jarjis (UMNO)	30,040	66.8%	46,014	15,114	85.85%
2018	P107 Sungai Buloh	Nuridah Mohd Salleh (PAS)	16,997	21.80%	Sivarasa Rasiah (PKR)	43,631	55.97%	77,951	26,634	85.93%
2018	P107 Sungai Buloh	Nuridah Mohd Salleh (PAS)	16,997	21.80%	Pakas Rao Applanaidoo (MIC)	16,681	21.40%	77,951	26,634	85.93%
2018	P107 Sungai Buloh	Nuridah Mohd Salleh (PAS)	16,997	21.80%	Zainurizzaman Moharam (PRM)	642	0.82%	77,951	26,634	85.93%
2022	P116 Wangsa Maju	Nuridah Mohd Salleh (PAS)	25,335	27.32%	Zahir Hassan (PKR)	46,031	49.63%	92,740	20,696	77.08%
2022	P116 Wangsa Maju	Nuridah Mohd Salleh (PAS)	25,335	27.32%	Mohd Shafei Abdullah (UMNO)	19,595	21.13%	92,740	20,696	77.08%
2022	P116 Wangsa Maju	Nuridah Mohd Salleh (PAS)	25,335	27.32%	Norzaila Arifin (PUTRA)	987	1.06%	92,740	20,696	77.08%
2022	P116 Wangsa Maju	Nuridah Mohd Salleh (PAS)	25,335	27.32%	Wee Choo Keong (WARISAN)	576	0.62%	92,740	20,696	77.08%
2022	P116 Wangsa Maju	Nuridah Mohd Salleh (PAS)	25,335	27.32%	Raveentheran Suntheralingam (Independent)	216	0.23%	92,740	20,696	77.08%

== Honours ==
- Malaysia
  - Companion of the Order of the Defender of the Realm (JMN) (2021)
