= Wee Choo Keong =

Malaysian politician (born 1953)

Wee Choo Keong SMK
- 黄朱强

Member of the Malaysian Parliament for Wangsa Maju
- In office 8 March 2008 – 5 May 2013
- Preceded by: Yew Teong Look (MCA)
- Succeeded by: Tan Kee Kwong (PKR)
- Majority: 150 (2008)

Member of the Malaysian Parliament for Bukit Bintang
- In office 21 October 1990 – 25 April 1995
- Preceded by: Lee Lam Thye (DAP)
- Succeeded by: Lee Chong Meng (MCA)
- Majority: 23,295 (1990)

Personal details
- Born: 26 June 1953 (age 73) Kelantan, Federation of Malaya (now Malaysia)
- Party: Democratic Action Party (DAP) (1986-1998); Malaysian Democratic Party (MDP) (1999-2008); Parti Keadilan Rakyat (PKR) (2008–2010); Independent (Since 2010); Heritage Party (Malaysia) (2022)
- Other political affiliations: Pakatan Rakyat (PR) (2008-2010); Gagasan Rakyat (GR) (1990-1996)
- Occupation: Politician, lawyer
- Website: weechookeong.wordpress.com

Wee Choo Keong (simplified Chinese: 黄朱强; traditional Chinese: 黃朱強; pinyin: Huáng Zhūqiáng; born 26 June 1953) is a Malaysian politician. He was the Member of Parliament for Bukit Bintang from 1990 to 1995 and Wangsa Maju from 2008 to 2013. Wee had been a member of the Democratic Action Party (DAP) before being expelled in 1998. He then formed the Malaysian Democratic Party (MDP) the same year. In 2008, he left the party to join the People's Justice Party (PKR) before becoming an independent in 2010. Wee was appointed Tourism Malaysia chairperson by the then ruling Barisan Nasional (BN) government on 17 June 2015.

== Political career ==
=== Democratic Action Party ===
Wee started his political career as a member of the DAP contesting in the 1986 general election and was elected as a member of parliament for the Bukit Bintang constituency (earlier was Kuala Lumpur Bandar before being renamed) in the 1990 general election.

In 1993, an injunction was issued against Wee and two other defendants from "printing, circulating or publishing any allegation of impropriety about the companies" after a case was brought by MBf alleging the defendants "unlawfully conspired with each other with the predominant purpose of injuring the companies by unlawful means." MBf later applied to have the defendants (including Wee) held in contempt of court for failing to obey the injunction. The application succeeded against Wee and another of his co-defendants, and Wee was eventually ordered to pay a RM7,000 fine on appeal. The injunction against Wee brought by MBf was set aside in 2007 with the Court of Appeal ruling, "The injunction was too wide in its terms and almost oppressive." He later sought damages against MBf and AmBank (who had acquired MBf) for loss of income due to his inability to be an MP and the damage to his professional standing as a lawyer.

Initially, the Returning Officer had declared Wee Choo Keong as the elected representative for Bukit Bintang on the night of 25 April 1995. However, Lee Chong Meng filed his petition to nullify the election because Wee had been convicted of the offence of contempt of Court and fined RM7,000, and hence disqualified to be a Member of Parliament under the provisions of Article 48(l)(e) of the Federal Constitution. The election was declared null and void. The Federal Court made a controversial decision to declare Lee Chong Meng the rightful winner. The Court of Appeal dismissed the appeal. No by-election was held by the Election Commission of Malaysia.

In addition, as Wee Choo Keong was fined the day before the nomination day, the DAP once allowed Teng Chang Khim to be nominated as an independent as a backup. However, after Wee Choo Keong's nomination was accepted by the Election Commission, the DAP asked Teng to withdraw from the election.

=== Malaysian Democratic Party (MDP) ===
Wee was removed from the Bukit Bintang seat in 1995 after a controversial court case, which nullified his re-election that year due to the fine he had received. He was ejected from the DAP in 1998 after being accused of damaging the party's image and went on to form the Malaysian Democratic Party (MDP). He later attempted to join Parti Keadilan Rakyat (PKR) but was rejected by the party, which stated at the time that they did not want renegades from DAP. Due to the ruling against him in the 1995 court case, he was unable to contest the 1999 election. He contested the 2004 elections but did not even receive enough votes to keep his deposit. Wee Choo Keong was later referred to by V.K. Lingam in the Lingam tape. After the videotape was made public in 2007, Wee stated he intended to file for judicial review of the 1995 decision. Later, he also lodged a report with Suhakam over the tape, arguing it demonstrated his human rights had been infringed.

=== People's Justice Party (PKR) ===
Before the 2008 general election, although still a member of the MDP, he was invited to join the PKR under the de facto leadership of Anwar Ibrahim and contest the Wangsa Maju constituency, which he later won with a slim majority of 150.

=== Independent ===
In May 2010, Wee left PKR to sit in Parliament as an independent, citing disappointment with the PKR-led state government in Selangor's handling of the Dengkil sand mining scandal and the influence of what he called "little Napoleons and trendy leftists" in the party. He did not recontest his seat in the 2013 general election.

=== Joining Warisan ===
Wee was reported that he will also make a return appearance with Warisan in GE15 contesting for Wangsa Maju under the Warisan Banner.

== Election results ==
Parliament of Malaysia
Year	Constituency	Candidate	Votes	Pct	Opponent(s)	Votes	Pct	Ballots cast	Majority	Turnout
1986	P093 Klang	Wee Choo Keong (DAP)	24,299	46.63%	Ng Cheng Kiat (MCA)	24,966	47.92%	53,026	667	70.74%
1986	P093 Klang	Wee Choo Keong (DAP)	24,299	46.63%	Azmi Ali @ Nik (PAS)	2,317	4.45%	53,026	667	70.74%
1986	P093 Klang	Wee Choo Keong (DAP)	24,299	46.63%	Gabriel Lee (SDP)	519	1.00%	53,026	667	70.74%
1990	P108 Bukit Bintang	Wee Choo Keong (DAP)	31,829	78.86%	Tan Kah Choun (MCA)	8,534	21.14%	40,558	23,295	61.40%
1995	P108 Bukit Bintang	Wee Choo Keong (DAP)	20,403	57.66%	Lee Chong Meng (MCA)	14,857	41.99%	36,666	5,546	61.75%
1995	P108 Bukit Bintang	Wee Choo Keong (DAP)	20,403	57.66%	Teng Chang Khim (IND)	123	0.35%	36,666	5,546	61.75%
2004	P108 Bukit Bintang	Wee Choo Keong (MDP)	1,107	2.81%	Fong Kui Lun (DAP)	19,103	48.44%	39,938	304	61.34%
2004	P108 Bukit Bintang	Wee Choo Keong (MDP)	1,107	2.81%	Tan Chew Mooi (MCA)	18,799	47.67%	39,938	304	61.34%
2004	P108 Bukit Bintang	Wee Choo Keong (MDP)	1,107	2.81%	Billi Lim Peng Soon (IND)	132	0.33%	39,938	304	61.34%
2008	P116 Wangsa Maju	Wee Choo Keong (PKR)	19,637	67.07%	Yew Teong Look (MCA)	19,487	31.35%	39,798	150	73.01%
2022	P116 Wangsa Maju	Wee Choo Keong (WARISAN)	576	0.62%	Zahir Hassan (PKR)	46,031	49.63%	93,493	20,696	77.08%
2022	P116 Wangsa Maju	Wee Choo Keong (WARISAN)	576	0.62%	Nuridah Mohd Salleh (PAS)	25,335	27.32%	93,493	20,696	77.08%
2022	P116 Wangsa Maju	Wee Choo Keong (WARISAN)	576	0.62%	Mohd Shafei Abdullah (UMNO)	19,595	21.13%	93,493	20,696	77.08%
2022	P116 Wangsa Maju	Wee Choo Keong (WARISAN)	576	0.62%	Norzaila Arifin (PEJUANG)	987	1.06%	93,493	20,696	77.08%
2022	P116 Wangsa Maju	Wee Choo Keong (WARISAN)	576	0.62%	Raveentheran Suntheralingam (IND)	216	0.23%	93,493	20,696	77.08%

== Honours ==
- Kelantan
  - Recipient of the Crown of Kelantan Decoration (SMK) (1997)
