= Malaysian Democratic Party =

Malaysian Democratic Party Parti Demokratik Malaysia MDP
- Abbreviation: MDP
- Leader: Wee Choo Keong
- Founded: 1998
- Dissolved: 2008
- Split from: Democratic Action Party
- Headquarters: Petaling Jaya, Selangor
- Youth wing: Young MDP
- Ideology: Social democracy
- Political position: Centre-left
- Colours: Blue

The Malaysian Democratic Party (MDP, Malay: Parti Demokratik Malaysia) was a political party in Malaysia formed by Wee Choo Keong in 1998, after he was expelled from Democratic Action Party (DAP) due to his fall-out and failed revolt against then secretary-general Lim Kit Siang.

Wee roped in two other former DAP stalwarts who had left the party earlier ex-Penang chairman Yeap Ghim Guan and three-term Sandakan MP Fung Ket Wing.

MDP contested both the 1999 and 2004 general elections but failed to win any seats.

Wee himself, who was the party secretary-general, even lost his deposit after contesting the Bukit Bintang parliamentary seat in 2004.

He later contested the 2008 general elections on the Parti Keadilan Rakyat (PKR) ticket and won. Following this, the MDP became inactive even though Wee was dropped for the 2013 general elections.

== General election results ==
Election	Total seats won	Seats contested	Total votes	Share of votes	Outcome of election	Election leader
1999	0 / 193	19	8,001	0.12%	; No representation in Parliament	Wee Choo Keong
2004	0 / 219	17	1,107	0.02%	; No representation in Parliament	Wee Choo Keong
2008	1 / 222	11	19,637	0.11%	▲1 seat; Opposition coalition (Pakatan Rakyat)	Wee Choo Keong

=== State elections ===
State election	State Legislative Assembly					
State election	Penang	Perak	Selangor	Negeri Sembilan	Johor	Total won / Total contested
2/3 majority	2 / 3	2 / 3	2 / 3	2 / 3	2 / 3	
1999	0 / 33	0 / 52	0 / 48	0 / 32	0 / 40	0 / 9

== See also ==
- List of political parties in Malaysia
- Politics of Malaysia
- Pakatan Rakyat
