= 1999 Malaysian general election =

- 29 November 1999

All 193 seats in the Dewan Rakyat 97 seats needed for a majority
- Registered: 9,546,303
- Turnout: 71.19%

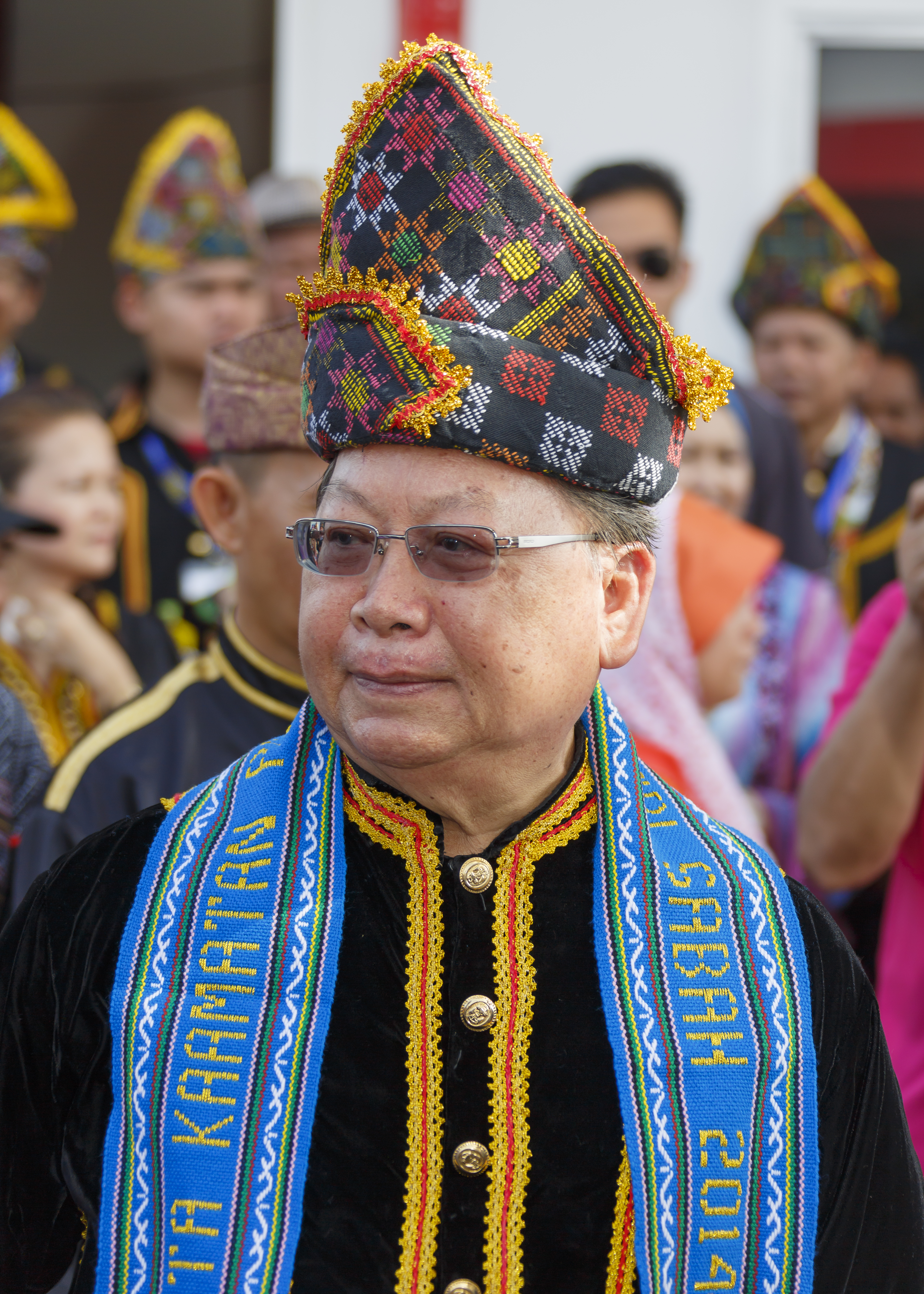
	First party	Second party	Third party
Leader	Mahathir Mohamad	Fadzil Noor	Joseph Pairin Kitingan
Party	UMNO	PAS	PBS
Alliance	BN	BA	–
Last election	162 seats, 65.16%	16 seats	3.33%, 8 seats
Seats won	148	42	3
Seat change	▼14	▲26	▼5
Popular vote	3,763,003	2,681,460	143,338
Percentage	56.52%	40.28%	2.15%
Swing	▼8.64pp	▲10.75pp	▼1.18pp
Prime Minister before election
Mahathir Mohamad
BN
Prime Minister-designate
Mahathir Mohamad
BN

General elections were held in Malaysia on Monday, 29 November 1999. Voting took place in all 193 parliamentary constituencies of Malaysia, each electing one Member of Parliament to the Dewan Rakyat, the dominant house of Parliament. State elections also took place in 394 state constituencies in 11 out of 13 states of Malaysia (except Sabah and Sarawak) on the same day. They were the last elections for Mahathir Mohamad as Prime Minister and Chairman of Barisan Nasional, until 2018. They were also the first elections held in a single day nationwide.

The opposition won a total of 113 state assembly seats, 98 of which went to the PAS, 11 to the DAP and 4 for Keadilan. In the states of Kelantan and Terengganu, the PAS won by a huge margin–41-2 against Barisan Nasional out of a total of 43 seats and 28-4 out of a total of 32 seats respectively, hence allowing them to form the state governments in these states. In addition, PAS also captured one-third of the state seats in Kedah, with the remaining two-thirds going to Barisan Nasional (UMNO won 16 seats, MCA 2 seats in Kedah).

The election results were seen as a great gain for PAS, who previously had no state seats in Kedah and capturing only one seat in Terengganu in the 1995 General Elections. Observers attributed this to the neglect by the Federal Administration in the states of Terengganu and Kelantan due to administration by different parties.

== Results ==
Party or alliance		Votes	%	Seats	+/–
Barisan Nasional	United Malays National Organisation	1,985,943	29.83	72	–17
Barisan Nasional	Malaysian Chinese Association	960,770	14.43	29	–1
Barisan Nasional	Parti Gerakan Rakyat Malaysia	187,323	2.81	6	–1
Barisan Nasional	Malaysian Indian Congress	171,998	2.58	7	0
Barisan Nasional	Sarawak United Peoples' Party	129,356	1.94	7	0
Barisan Nasional	Parti Pesaka Bumiputera Bersatu	111,389	1.67	10	0
Barisan Nasional	Parti Bansa Dayak Sarawak	51,803	0.78	6	+1
Barisan Nasional	UPKO	46,913	0.70	3	New
Barisan Nasional	Sabah Progressive Party	46,756	0.70	2	0
Barisan Nasional	Sarawak National Party	45,419	0.68	4	+1
Barisan Nasional	Liberal Democratic Party	12,800	0.19	1	0
Barisan Nasional	Parti Bersatu Rakyat Sabah	12,533	0.19	0	0
Barisan Nasional	Independent			1	0
Barisan Nasional	Total	3,763,003	56.52	148	–14
Barisan Alternatif	Pan-Malaysian Islamic Party	996,466	14.97	27	+20
Barisan Alternatif	Democratic Action Party	848,040	12.74	10	+1
Barisan Alternatif	National Justice Party	767,964	11.54	5	New
Barisan Alternatif	Parti Rakyat Malaysia	68,990	1.04	0	0
Barisan Alternatif	Total	2,681,460	40.28	42	+26
United Sabah Party		143,338	2.15	3	–5
State Reform Party		23,354	0.35	0	New
Malaysian Democratic Party		7,601	0.11	0	New
Pan-Malaysian Islamic Front		409	0.01	0	New
Malaysian People's Justice Front		274	0.00	0	0
Independents		38,054	0.57	0	0
Total		6,657,493	100.00	193	+1
Valid votes		6,657,493	97.97		
Invalid/blank votes		138,256	2.03		
Total votes		6,795,749	100.00		
Registered voters/turnout		9,546,303	71.19		
Source: Election Passport

=== By state ===
==== Johor ====
Party or alliance		Votes	%	Seats	+/–
Barisan Nasional	United Malays National Organisation	393,831	47.00	13	0
Barisan Nasional	Malaysian Chinese Association	190,871	22.78	6	0
Barisan Nasional	Malaysian Indian Congress	26,351	3.14	1	0
Barisan Nasional	Total	611,053	72.92	20	0
Barisan Alternatif	Democratic Action Party	79,200	9.45	0	0
Barisan Alternatif	Pan-Malaysian Islamic Party	57,273	6.83	0	0
Barisan Alternatif	National Justice Party	62,554	7.46	0	New
Barisan Alternatif	Parti Rakyat Malaysia	27,912	3.33	0	0
Barisan Alternatif	Total	226,939	27.08	0	0
Total		837,992	100.00	20	0
Valid votes		837,992	97.31		
Invalid/blank votes		23,206	2.69		
Total votes		861,198	100.00		
Registered voters/turnout		1,190,400	72.35		

==== Kedah ====
Party or alliance		Votes	%	Seats	+/–
Barisan Nasional	United Malays National Organisation	260,380	46.00	5	–8
Barisan Nasional	Malaysian Chinese Association	55,242	9.76	2	0
Barisan Nasional	Total	315,622	55.76	7	–8
Barisan Alternatif	Pan-Malaysian Islamic Party	171,825	30.35	8	+8
Barisan Alternatif	National Justice Party	65,371	11.55	0	New
Barisan Alternatif	Democratic Action Party	13,258	2.34	0	0
Barisan Alternatif	Total	250,454	44.24	10	+8
Total		566,076	100.00	15	0
Valid votes		566,076	98.10		
Invalid/blank votes		10,988	1.90		
Total votes		577,064	100.00		
Registered voters/turnout		765,028	75.43		

==== Kelantan ====
Party or alliance		Votes	%	Seats	+/–
Barisan Alternatif	Pan-Malaysian Islamic Party	228,111	47.46	10	+4
Barisan Alternatif	National Justice Party	64,763	13.47	3	New
Barisan Alternatif	Total	292,874	60.93	13	+8
Barisan Nasional	United Malays National Organisation	187,102	38.93	1	–1
Pan-Malaysian Islamic Front		409	0.09	0	New
Malaysian People's Justice Front		274	0.06	0	0
Total		480,659	100.00	14	0
Valid votes		480,659	98.13		
Invalid/blank votes		9,151	1.87		
Total votes		489,810	100.00		
Registered voters/turnout		641,754	76.32		

==== Kuala Lumpur ====
Party or alliance		Votes	%	Seats
Barisan Nasional	Malaysian Chinese Association	82,298	18.74	1
Barisan Nasional	Parti Gerakan Rakyat Malaysia	70,884	16.14	2
Barisan Nasional	United Malays National Organisation	67,310	15.33	3
Barisan Nasional	Total	220,492	50.21	6
Barisan Alternatif	Democratic Action Party	116,776	26.59	4
Barisan Alternatif	National Justice Party	62,600	14.26	0
Barisan Alternatif	Parti Rakyat Malaysia	20,342	4.63	0
Barisan Alternatif	Pan-Malaysian Islamic Party	17,111	3.90	0
Barisan Alternatif	Total	216,829	49.38	4
Malaysian Democratic Party		457	0.10	0
Independents		1,335	0.30	0
Total		439,113	100.00	10
Valid votes		439,113	99.07	
Invalid/blank votes		4,100	0.93	
Total votes		443,213	100.00	
Registered voters/turnout		627,377	70.65	

==== Labuan ====
Party or alliance		Votes	%	Seats	+/–
Barisan Nasional	United Malays National Organisation	8,687	71.34	1	0
United Sabah Party		2,172	17.84	0	0
Barisan Alternatif	Pan-Malaysian Islamic Party	1,318	10.82	0	New
Total		12,177	100.00	1	0
Valid votes		12,177	98.58		
Invalid/blank votes		176	1.42		
Total votes		12,353	100.00		
Registered voters/turnout		21,611	57.16		

==== Malacca ====
Party or alliance		Votes	%	Seats	+/–
Barisan Nasional	United Malays National Organisation	85,912	36.60	3	0
Barisan Nasional	Malaysian Chinese Association	46,891	19.98	1	0
Barisan Nasional	Total	132,803	56.58	4	0
Barisan Alternatif	National Justice Party	43,051	18.34	0	New
Barisan Alternatif	Democratic Action Party	33,611	14.32	1	0
Barisan Alternatif	Pan-Malaysian Islamic Party	25,239	10.75	0	0
Barisan Alternatif	Total	101,901	43.42	1	0
Total		234,704	100.00	5	0
Valid votes		234,704	97.72		
Invalid/blank votes		5,469	2.28		
Total votes		240,173	100.00		
Registered voters/turnout		313,676	76.57		

==== Negeri Sembilan ====
Party or alliance		Votes	%	Seats	+/–
Barisan Nasional	United Malays National Organisation	79,193	27.88	4	0
Barisan Nasional	Malaysian Chinese Association	61,880	21.78	2	0
Barisan Nasional	Malaysian Indian Congress	27,112	9.54	1	0
Barisan Nasional	Total	168,185	59.21	7	0
Barisan Alternatif	Democratic Action Party	68,526	24.12	0	0
Barisan Alternatif	Pan-Malaysian Islamic Party	23,773	8.37	0	0
Barisan Alternatif	National Justice Party	23,585	8.30	0	New
Barisan Alternatif	Total	116,884	41.15	0	0
Total		284,069	100.00	7	0
Valid votes		284,069	97.16		
Invalid/blank votes		8,318	2.84		
Total votes		292,387	100.00		
Registered voters/turnout		406,541	71.92		

==== Pahang ====
Party or alliance		Votes	%	Seats	+/–
Barisan Nasional	United Malays National Organisation	149,279	39.83	8	0
Barisan Nasional	Malaysian Chinese Association	66,015	17.61	3	0
Barisan Nasional	Total	215,294	57.45	11	0
Barisan Alternatif	Pan-Malaysian Islamic Party	81,984	21.88	0	0
Barisan Alternatif	National Justice Party	50,711	13.53	0	New
Barisan Alternatif	Democratic Action Party	26,786	7.15	0	0
Barisan Alternatif	Total	159,481	42.55	0	0
Total		374,775	100.00	11	0
Valid votes		374,775	97.48		
Invalid/blank votes		9,672	2.52		
Total votes		384,447	100.00		
Registered voters/turnout		522,871	73.53		

==== Penang ====
Party or alliance		Votes	%	Seats	+/–
Barisan Nasional	Malaysian Chinese Association	84,698	17.55	1	–1
Barisan Nasional	Parti Gerakan Rakyat Malaysia	83,607	17.32	2	0
Barisan Nasional	United Malays National Organisation	79,565	16.49	3	–1
Barisan Nasional	Total	247,870	51.36	6	–2
Barisan Alternatif	Democratic Action Party	169,973	35.22	4	+1
Barisan Alternatif	National Justice Party	54,987	11.39	1	New
Barisan Alternatif	Pan-Malaysian Islamic Party	8,810	1.83	0	0
Barisan Alternatif	Total	233,770	48.44	5	+2
Independents		942	0.20	0	0
Total		482,582	100.00	11	0
Valid votes		482,582	97.94		
Invalid/blank votes		10,150	2.06		
Total votes		492,732	100.00		
Registered voters/turnout		653,572	75.39		

==== Perak ====
Party or alliance		Votes	%	Seats	+/–
Barisan Nasional	Malaysian Chinese Association	179,632	24.01	6	–1
Barisan Nasional	United Malays National Organisation	170,223	22.76	9	–2
Barisan Nasional	Parti Gerakan Rakyat Malaysia	32,832	4.39	3	0
Barisan Nasional	Malaysian Indian Congress	32,425	4.33	2	0
Barisan Nasional	Total	415,112	55.49	20	–3
Barisan Alternatif	Democratic Action Party	156,110	20.87	1	+1
Barisan Alternatif	Pan-Malaysian Islamic Party	93,454	12.49	2	+2
Barisan Alternatif	National Justice Party	80,067	10.70	0	New
Barisan Alternatif	Total	329,631	44.07	3	+3
Malaysian Democratic Party		3,312	0.44	0	New
Total		748,055	100.00	23	0
Valid votes		748,055	97.34		
Invalid/blank votes		20,419	2.66		
Total votes		768,474	100.00		
Registered voters/turnout		1,159,858	66.26		

==== Perlis ====
Party or alliance		Votes	%	Seats	+/–
Barisan Nasional	United Malays National Organisation	46,212	56.17	3	0
Barisan Alternatif	Pan-Malaysian Islamic Party	26,191	31.84	0	0
Barisan Alternatif	National Justice Party	9,867	11.99	0	New
Barisan Alternatif	Total	36,058	43.83	0	9
Total		82,270	100.00	3	0
Valid votes		82,270	98.92		
Invalid/blank votes		896	1.08		
Total votes		83,166	100.00		
Registered voters/turnout		105,733	78.66		

==== Sabah ====
Party or alliance		Votes	%	Seats	+/–
Barisan Nasional	United Malays National Organisation	139,654	32.06	11	+2
Barisan Nasional	UPKO	46,913	10.77	3	New
Barisan Nasional	Sabah Progressive Party	46,756	10.73	2	0
Barisan Nasional	Liberal Democratic Party	12,800	2.94	1	0
Barisan Nasional	Parti Bersatu Rakyat Sabah	12,533	2.88	0	New
Barisan Nasional	Total	258,656	59.38	17	+5
United Sabah Party		141,166	32.41	3	–5
Barisan Alternatif	National Justice Party	18,344	4.21	0	New
Barisan Alternatif	Pan-Malaysian Islamic Party	2,244	0.52	0	0
Barisan Alternatif	Democratic Action Party	973	0.22	0	0
Barisan Alternatif	Total	21,561	4.95	0	0
Malaysian Democratic Party		2,956	0.68	0	New
State Reform Party		206	0.05	0	New
Independents		11,028	2.53	0	0
Total		435,573	100.00	20	0
Valid votes		435,573	98.90		
Invalid/blank votes		4,840	1.10		
Total votes		440,413	100.00		
Registered voters/turnout		719,151	61.24		

==== Sarawak ====
Party or alliance		Votes	%	Seats	+/–
Barisan Nasional	Sarawak United Peoples' Party	129,356	25.30	7	0
Barisan Nasional	Parti Pesaka Bumiputera Bersatu	111,389	21.79	10	+1
Barisan Nasional	Parti Bansa Dayak Sarawak	51,803	10.13	6	0
Barisan Nasional	Sarawak National Party	45,419	8.88	4	0
Barisan Nasional	Independent			1	0
Barisan Nasional	Total	337,967	66.11	28	+1
Barisan Alternatif	Democratic Action Party	75,922	14.85	0	New
Barisan Alternatif	National Justice Party	49,774	9.74	0	New
Barisan Alternatif	Pan-Malaysian Islamic Party	2,438	0.48	0	0
Barisan Alternatif	Total	128,134	25.06	0	0
State Reform Party		23,148	4.53	0	New
Independents		22,005	4.30	0	0
Total		511,254	100.00	28	+1
Valid votes		511,254	98.31		
Invalid/blank votes		8,781	1.69		
Total votes		520,035	100.00		
Registered voters/turnout		835,027	62.28		

==== Selangor ====
Party or alliance		Votes	%	Seats	+/–
Barisan Nasional	Malaysian Chinese Association	193,243	22.51	6	0
Barisan Nasional	United Malays National Organisation	190,895	22.23	8	0
Barisan Nasional	Malaysian Indian Congress	86,110	10.03	3	0
Barisan Nasional	Total	470,248	54.77	17	0
Barisan Alternatif	National Justice Party	161,575	18.82	0	New
Barisan Alternatif	Democratic Action Party	106,905	12.45	0	0
Barisan Alternatif	Pan-Malaysian Islamic Party	95,643	11.14	0	0
Barisan Alternatif	Parti Rakyat Malaysia	20,736	2.42	0	0
Barisan Alternatif	Total	384,859	44.83	0	0
Malaysian Democratic Party		876	0.10	0	New
Independents		2,569	0.30	0	0
Total		858,552	100.00	17	0
Valid votes		858,552	98.08		
Invalid/blank votes		16,785	1.92		
Total votes		875,337	100.00		
Registered voters/turnout		1,196,365	73.17		

==== Terengganu ====
Party or alliance		Votes	%	Seats	+/–
Barisan Alternatif	Pan-Malaysian Islamic Party	161,052	52.01	7	+6
Barisan Alternatif	National Justice Party	20,715	6.69	1	New
Barisan Alternatif	Total	181,767	58.70	8	+7
Barisan Nasional	United Malays National Organisation	127,700	41.24	0	–7
Independents		175	0.06	0	0
Total		309,642	100.00	8	0
Valid votes		309,642	98.32		
Invalid/blank votes		5,305	1.68		
Total votes		314,947	100.00		
Registered voters/turnout		387,339	81.31		

== See also ==
- 1999 Malaysian state elections
