= 2014 Bukit Gelugor by-election =

Election in Malaysia

- 25 May 2014

Bukit Gelugor seat in the Dewan Rakyat
	DAP	PCM	IND
Candidate	Ramkarpal Singh	Huan Cheng Guan	Mohamed Nabi Bux Mohamed Nabi Abdul Satha
Party	DAP	PCM	Independent
Alliance	PR
Popular vote	41,242	3,583	799
Percentage	89.95%	7.81%	1.74%
	IND
Candidate	Abu Backer Sidek Mohammad Zan
Party	Independent
Popular vote	225
Percentage	0.49%
MP before election
Karpal Singh
DAP
Elected MP
Ramkarpal Singh
DAP

A by-election was held for the Dewan Rakyat parliamentary seat of Bukit Gelugor on 25 May 2014 following the nomination day on 12 May 2014. The seat fell vacant after the passing of the incumbent MP, Karpal Singh in a motor accident near Kampar, Perak on 17 April 2014.

== Background ==
Karpal hailed from the Democratic Action Party, a component party of Pakatan Rakyat. A political and legal veteran, he served in the Parliament since 1978 (except for a brief period) and as the chairman of the DAP from 2004 until 2014. He won by a majority of 41,778 votes against Barisan Nasional (Malaysian Chinese Association) candidate Teh Beng Yeam in the 2013 general election.

== Nominations and campaign ==
The DAP fielded Ramkarpal Singh, Karpal's son and a lawyer. Hours after Ramkarpal's candidacy was announced, MCA decided to defer from contesting the by-election thus leaving BN with no candidate in the by-election. BN chief and Prime Minister Najib Razak indicated that BN would instead throw support on other candidates. Parti Cinta Malaysia vice-president and former BN MP for Batu Kawan Huan Cheng Guan contested in the by-election along with two independents Mohamed Nabi Bux Mohamed Abdul Sathar and Abu Backer Sidek Mohammad Zan. Abu Backer withdrew a day before the by-election, although his decision was not recognized by the Electoral Commission. The number of eligible voters in this constituency was 82,431.

== Results ==
Ramkarpal Singh won the by-election with a majority of 37,659 votes compared to his nearest challenger. The other three candidates lost their deposit after failing to receive at least one-eighth of the votes. The turnout in the by-election is 30% lower compared to the turnout in the 2013 general election.

Malaysian general by-election, 25 May 2014: Bukit Gelugor Upon the death of incumbent, Karpal Singh
Party	Candidate	Votes	%	∆%
DAP	Ramkarpal Singh Karpal Singh	41,242	89.95	+ 9.44
Love Malaysia Party	Huan Cheng Guan	3,583	7.81	+ 7.81
Independent	Mohamed Nabi Bux Mohamed Nabi Abdul Sathar	799	1.74	+ 1.74
Independent	Abu Backer Sidek Mohammad Zan	225	0.49	+ 0.49
Total valid votes		45,849	100.00	
Total rejected ballots		539		
Unreturned ballots		50		
Turnout		46,438	56.34	
Registered electors		82,431		
Majority		37,659	82.14	
DAP hold		Swing		
Source(s) "Pilihan Raya Kecil P.051 Bukit Gelugor". Election Commission of Malaysia. "Federal Government Gazette - Notice of Contested Election - By-election of the Dewan Rakyat of P.051 Bukit Gelugor for the State of Penang [P.U. (B) 215/2014]" (PDF). Attorney General's Chambers of Malaysia. 14 May 2014. "P. U. (B) 250/2014 Federal Government Gazette - Results of Contested Election and Statement of the Poll after the Official Addition of Votes for the By-election of P.051 Bukit Gelugor" (PDF). Attorney General's Chambers of Malaysia. 28 May 2014.
