= Huan Cheng Guan =

Malaysian politician

Yang Berbahagia Datuk Huan Cheng Guan DPSM
- 范清渊

President of the Love Malaysia Party
- In office 6 August 2009 – 20 June 2026
- Succeeded by: Hamzah Zainuddin (as President of Parti Wawasan Negara)

Vice President of the Parti Wawasan Negara
- Incumbent
- Assumed office 20 June 2026

Member of the Malaysian Parliament for Batu Kawan
- In office 21 March 2004 – 8 March 2008
- Preceded by: new constituency
- Succeeded by: Ramasamy Palanisamy (PR–DAP)
- Majority: 8,998 (2004)

Personal details
- Born: Huan Cheng Guan; 13 February 1961 (age 65) Penang, Federation of Malaya (now Malaysia)
- Party: Parti Gerakan Rakyat Malaysia (Gerakan) (–2009); Love Malaysia Party (PCM) (2009–2026); Parti Wawasan Negara (Wawasan) (2026–)
- Other political affiliations: Barisan Nasional (BN) (–2026); Perikatan Nasional (PN) (2026–)
- Spouse: Chan Siew Lan
- Children: 2

Huan Cheng Guan is a Malaysian politician who served as President of Love Malaysia Party (PCM) from its establishment of the party, Member of Parliament (MP) for Batu Kawan from March 2004 to March 2008 as well as Vice President of Parti Gerakan Rakyat Malaysia (Gerakan).

Before he enter politics he is a former technician of the Royal Malaysian Air Force (RMAF).

== Political career ==
Huan Cheng Guan made his first electoral debut in 2004 general election at the Batu Kawan parliamentary seat. In 2008 general election, he switch to Bukit Tambun state seat, however he was defeat by Law Choo Kiang from PKR. In 2009, he resigned from Gerakan and formed the Love Malaysia Party (PCM). He contest in 2013 general election, 2014 Bukit Gelugor by-election and 2018 general election, but was defeated. In 2022, he return all the medals given by the Yang di-Pertua Negeri of Penang.

== Election results ==
Parliament of Malaysia
Year	Constituency	Candidate	Votes	Pct	Opponent(s)	Votes	Pct	Ballots cast	Majority	Turnout
2004	P046 Batu Kawan	Huan Cheng Guan (Gerakan)	17,097	53.85%	Law Choo Kiang (PKR)	8,099	25.51%	32,559	8,998	75.62%
2004	P046 Batu Kawan	Huan Cheng Guan (Gerakan)	17,097	53.85%	Tanasekharan Autherapady (DAP)	6,552	20.64%	32,559	8,998	75.62%
2013	P046 Batu Kawan	Huan Cheng Guan (PCM)	1,801	3.64%	Kasthuriraani Patto (DAP)	36,636	74.14%	50,208	25,962	87.32%
2013	P046 Batu Kawan	Huan Cheng Guan (PCM)	1,801	3.64%	Gobalakrishnan Narayanasamy (MIC)	10,674	21.60%	50,208	25,962	87.32%
2013	P046 Batu Kawan	Huan Cheng Guan (PCM)	1,801	3.64%	Mohan Apparoo (IND)	305	0.62%	50,208	25,962	87.32%
2014	P051 Bukit Gelugor	Huan Cheng Guan (PCM)	3,583	7.81%	Ramkarpal Singh Karpal Singh (DAP)	41,242	89.95%	46,438	37,659	56.34%
2014	P051 Bukit Gelugor	Huan Cheng Guan (PCM)	3,583	7.81%	Mohamed Nabi Bux Mohamed Nabi Abdul Sathar (IND)	799	1.74%	46,438	37,659	56.34%
2014	P051 Bukit Gelugor	Huan Cheng Guan (PCM)	3,583	7.81%	Abu Backer Sidek Mohammad Zan (IND)	225	0.49%	46,438	37,659	56.34%
2018	P043 Bagan	Huan Cheng Guan (PCM)	502	0.84%	Lim Guan Eng (DAP)	51,653	85.96%	60,642	43,902	84.72%
2018	P043 Bagan	Huan Cheng Guan (PCM)	502	0.84%	Lee Beng Seng (MCA)	7,751	12.90%	60,642	43,902	84.72%
2018	P043 Bagan	Huan Cheng Guan (PCM)	502	0.84%	Koay Xing Boon (MUP)	181	0.30%	60,642	43,902	84.72%

Penang State Legislative Assembly
Year	Constituency	Candidate	Votes	Pct	Opponent(s)	Votes	Pct	Ballots cast	Majority	Turnout
2008	N18 Bukit Tambun	Huan Cheng Guan (Gerakan)	4,726	32.40%	Law Choo Kiang (PKR)	9,855	67.70%	14,826	5,129	81.40%

== Honours ==
- Malacca
  - Companion Class II of the Exalted Order of Malacca (DPSM) – Datuk (2013)
- Penang
  - Member of the Order of the Defender of State (DJN) (2003, returned on 2022)
  - Recipient of the Distinguished Conduct Medal (PKT) (returned on 2022)
  - Recipient of the Meritorious Service Medal (PJK) (returned on 2022)
  - Recipient of the Community Service Medal (PJM) (returned on 2022)
