= Nurul Izzah Anwar =

Malaysian politician (born 1980)

- نور العزة أنور
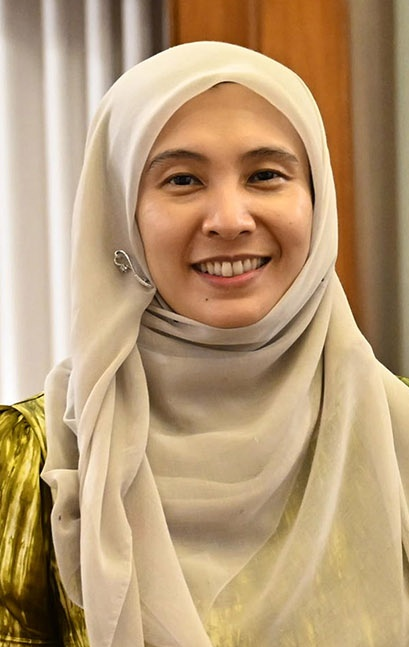
- Nurul Izzah in Dhaka, 2025

6th Deputy President of the People's Justice Party
- Incumbent
- Assumed office 24 May 2025 (On leave: since 16 August 2026)
- President: Anwar Ibrahim
- Preceded by: Rafizi Ramli

Vice President of the People's Justice Party
- In office 20 July 2022 – 24 May 2025
- President: Anwar Ibrahim
- In office 28 November 2010 – 17 December 2018
- President: Wan Azizah Wan Ismail (2010–2018); Anwar Ibrahim (2018)

Chairperson of the Consideration of Bills Select Committee
- In office 4 December 2018 – 18 July 2019
- Preceded by: Position established
- Succeeded by: Ramkarpal Singh
Parliamentary offices
Member of the Malaysian Parliament for Permatang Pauh
In office 9 May 2018 – 19 November 2022
Preceded by	Wan Azizah Wan Ismail
Succeeded by	Muhammad Fawwaz Mohamad Jan
Majority	15,668 (2018)
Member of the Malaysian Parliament for Lembah Pantai
In office 8 March 2008 – 9 May 2018
Preceded by	Shahrizat Abdul Jalil
Succeeded by	Fahmi Fadzil
Majority	2,895 (2008); 1,847 (2013)

Personal details
- Born: 19 November 1980 (age 45) Kuala Lumpur, Malaysia
- Party: People's Justice Party (1998–present)
- Spouses: Raja Ahmad Shahrir Iskandar Raja Salim (m. 2003; div. 2015) Yin Shao Loong (m. 2022)
- Children: 2
- Parents: Anwar Ibrahim (father); Wan Azizah Wan Ismail (mother)
- Education: Universiti Tenaga Nasional (BEng); Johns Hopkins University (MA)
- Occupation: Politician
- Website: www.nurulizzah.com
- Nurul Izzah Anwar's voice Nurul Izzah speaking about integrity Recorded 20 October 2021

Nurul Izzah binti Anwar (Note: Jawi: نور العزة أنور) (born 19 November 1980) is a Malaysian politician who served as the Member of Parliament for Permatang Pauh from 2018 to 2022. A member of the People's Justice Party and the eldest daughter of the 10th prime minister, Anwar Ibrahim, she also represented Lembah Pantai in the Parliament of Malaysia from 2008 to 2018.

Born in Kuala Lumpur into politician family of Anwar Ibrahim and Wan Azizah Wan Ismail, Nurul Izzah graduated from Johns Hopkins University in 2007 with a master's degree in international relations. She became publicly active in 1998 during her father Anwar's dismissal and imprisonment, participating in the Reformasi movement and co-founding the People's Justice Party in 1999. She entered parliament in 2008, winning the Lembah Pantai seat, and campaigned on multiracial inclusivity, government accountability, and social justice. In parliament, she advocated open government, equitable development, increased representation of women and youth, and policies based on need rather than ethnicity.

In 2010, two years after joining parliament, Nurul Izzah was elected as the PKR's youngest vice president. She retained her Lembah Pantai seat in the 2013 general election and was active in promoting political reform, transparency, and parliamentary oversight. She faced several detentions and investigations related to her activism, including under the Sedition Act, and engaged in advocacy on Sabah sovereignty and electoral matters. In 2018, she won the Permatang Pauh seat, served on parliamentary committees, and led initiatives such as the TVET Empowerment Committee and the Multidimensional Poverty Index report. She resigned as PKR vice-president in 2018 but was reappointed for the 2022–2025 term. After losing her parliamentary seat in 2022, she served as an adviser on economic and social policy and chaired the think tank Social & Economic Research Initiative. In 2025, she was elected deputy president of PKR, focusing on party unity and engagement with grassroots members.

Nurul Izzah has advocated for greater political participation by women and strengthened legal protections for women and families in Malaysia. She has engaged in civil rights and policy reform, including national prison reform, parliamentary reforms such as establishing a central authority for TVET, and introducing private member's bills on issues including hate crimes, the Sedition Act, the Petroleum Development Act, and media regulation. As MP for Permatang Pauh, she contributed to public health, women's vocational development, poverty studies, and recognition of technical and vocational skills. She has also supported Palestinian rights, calling for an end to the Israeli occupation and submitting protest notes to multiple embassies with parliamentary and civil society backing. Domestically, she has emphasised the need for locally rooted leadership in Sabah, accountability over the Freedom Flotilla incident, and careful review of corporal punishment in schools.

== Early life and education ==
Nurul Izzah Anwar, born on 19 November 1980, is the eldest daughter of Malaysian politicians Anwar Ibrahim and Wan Azizah Wan Ismail. She received her early education at Sekolah Kebangsaan Bukit Damansara in Kuala Lumpur, followed by secondary schooling at Sekolah Menengah Sri Bandaraya and Sekolah Menengah Assunta in Petaling Jaya. Nurul Izzah began her tertiary studies at Universiti Teknologi Petronas before transferring to Universiti Tenaga Nasional, where she earned a Bachelor's degree in electrical and electronic engineering in 2004. She later completed a Master's degree in international relations, specialising in Southeast Asian studies, at the School of Advanced International Studies, Johns Hopkins University in Washington, graduating in May 2007.

== Political career ==
=== Entry into politics (1998–2008) ===
Nurul Izzah became a public figure in 1998 following the dismissal and imprisonment of her father on charges of sodomy and corruption. As the eldest child, she took on an active role in the Reformasi movement, earning the nickname Puteri Reformasi ("Princess of Reform") for her leadership alongside her mother. (Note: Reformasi was a political movement that evolved into a wider push for democracy, human rights, and political reform in Malaysia.) In 1999, she became one of the co-founders of the People's Justice Party (Parti Keadilan Rakyat, PKR), a multiethnic party formed in response to her father's arrest. Her image as a young reformist resonated widely, especially among younger Malaysians, and that Prime Minister Mahathir Mohamad was inspired to establish the Puteri UMNO in 2001, a youth wing for young women, as a counter to her and Wan Azizah's growing influence.

In a June 2002 interview, Nurul Izzah expressed her continued resentment towards former Inspector-General of Police Abdul Rahim Mohd Noor for assaulting and imprisoning her father in 1998. She spoke about the long-term impact on her father's health, the emotional toll on her siblings, and the burden she carried as the eldest child during his incarceration. She later revealed that she found it difficult to balance expectations when asked to contest the 2004 general election while still a student, describing the experience as a conflict between her dedication to the reform movement and her academic commitments.

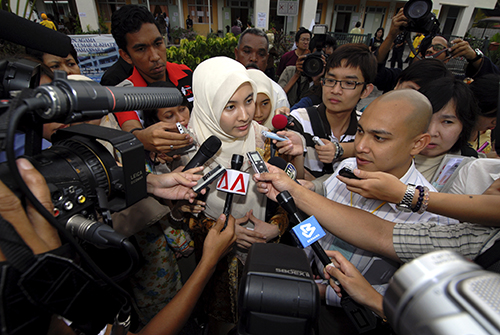
Nurul Izzah questioned by reporters during the 2008 general election

In the 2008 general election, Nurul Izzah made her parliamentary debut by winning the Lembah Pantai seat, defeating then Women's Minister Shahrizat Abdul Jalil in what was widely regarded as a major political upset. Despite being relatively inexperienced, she was seen by many voters as qualified, well-educated, and principled. Representing her party, she campaigned against Malaysia's entrenched race-based political system, advocating instead for a multiracial and inclusive vision of national unity aligned with the principle of 1Malaysia. Securing 21,728 votes against Shahrizat's 18,833, her appeal among both male voters and single mothers was seen as key to her victory.

Nurul Izzah advocated open government, equitable development, and putting an end to race-based patronage following her entry into the parliament. She supported broadcasting parliamentary sittings and greater public scrutiny and investment, describing her experience in the Dewan Rakyat as demanding but essential to ensuring government accountability. She promoted the representation of women in politics to correct gender imbalance, emphasised Pakatan Rakyat's commitment to democratic change and social justice despite federal-level resistance, and demanded increased political participation by youth. She also supported transparency in public spending, community participation in governance, and policies determined by need rather than ethnicity.

=== Vice President of PKR (2010–2018) ===
Nurul Izzah became the youngest person to hold the position of vice-president of the PKR at the age of 30, two years after she joined the Dewan Rakyat in 2008. Her appointment was officially announced on 28 November 2010 during the PKR's 7th National Congress. The same congress also ratified Azmin Ali as deputy president. By 2012, she had gained rising influence among youth and reform-minded voters, reflecting her growing role within the party and Malaysian politics. In that same year, Nurul Izzah was recognised as a Young Global Leader by the World Economic Forum, an honour awarded to outstanding leaders under 40 for their professional achievements and contributions to society.

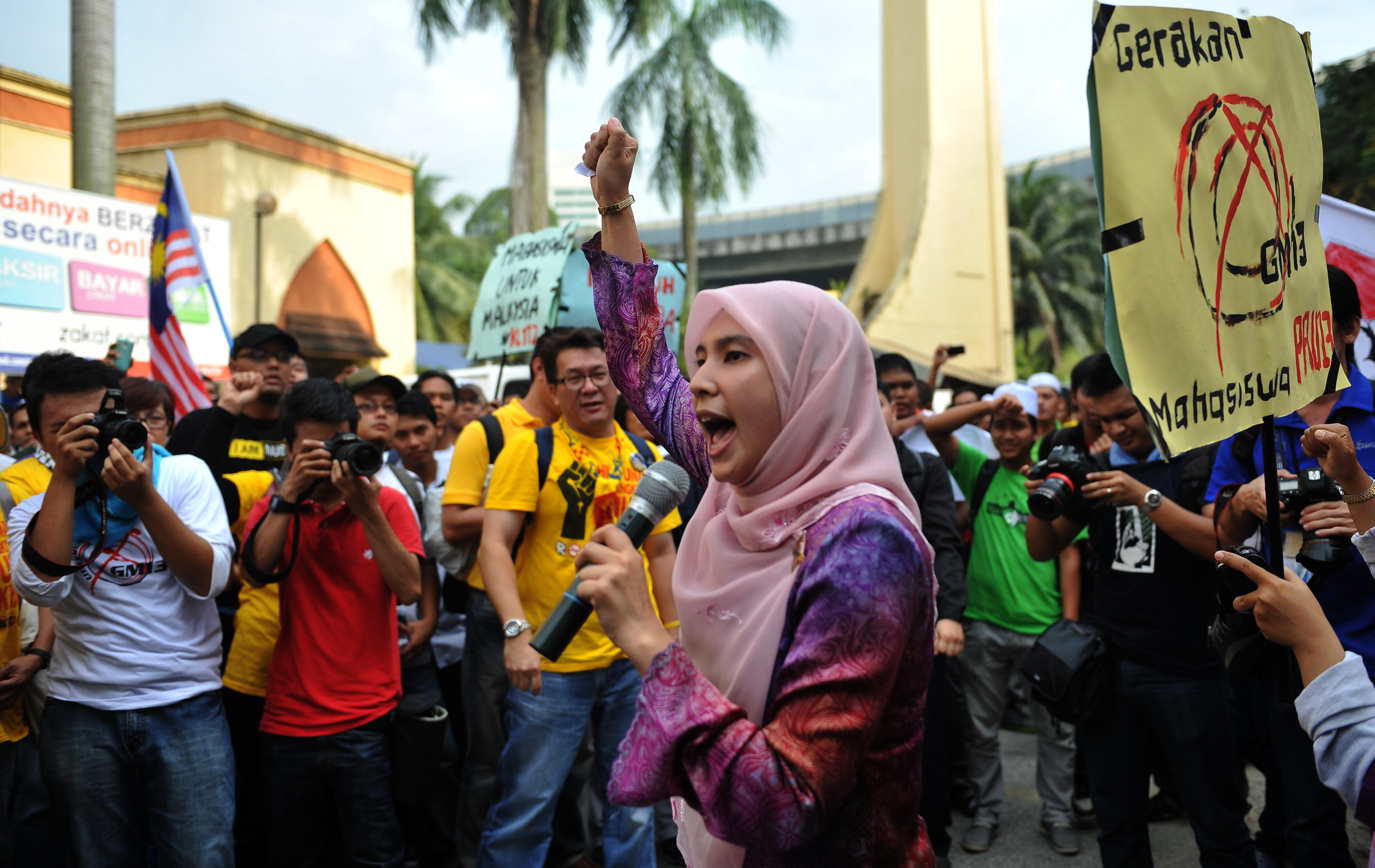
Nurul Izzah at the 2013 People's Uprising rally held at Stadium Merdeka

In the 2013 general election, Nurul Izzah defended her Lembah Pantai seat against Raja Nong Chik from Barisan Nasional (BN), winning with a majority of 1,848 votes, receiving 31,008 votes compared to Raja Nong Chik's 29,161. Her support came largely from middle- and upper-class voters. She raised concerns about electoral irregularities, describing the contest as one of Malaysia's most contested elections, and unsuccessfully challenged the inclusion of over 5,000 untraceable voters. She emphasised her commitment to political processes that are transparent and conducted according to established rules. In August 2013, she called for Malaysia to pursue independent reforms rather than accept the terms of the Trans-Pacific Partnership Agreement without scrutiny, advocating stronger parliamentary oversight, political reforms, economic restructuring, and the protection of natural resources to safeguard national interests and international competitiveness.

On 16 March 2015, Nurul Izzah was detained under the Sedition Act 1948 for participating in the #KitaLawan rally, an anti-government movement in Malaysia that included protests against the Goods and Services Tax and other government initiative. Lim Kit Siang argued that the arrest violated the Houses of Parliament (Privileges and Powers) Act 1952, which protects MPs' statements in Parliament except on matters involving the monarchy, national language, Malay privileges, or citizenship. He described the arrest as illegal and called on the Attorney General to act. The International Commission of Jurists condemned the detention, demanded her immediate release, and called for the repeal of the Sedition Act, stating that it was being used to restrict freedom of expression. Amnesty International also criticised her arrest and overnight detention. She was released the following day after spending a night in custody.

In November 2015, Nurul Izzah met with Jacel Kiram, daughter of the self-proclaimed Sultan Jamalul Kiram III, in the Philippines. The meeting was part of a delegation visit arranged by local hosts. She stated that the purpose was to support peace efforts and reaffirm PKR's commitment to Sabah's sovereignty. Some Sabah politicians, including leaders from the Sabah Progressive Party and the United Progressive Kinabalu Organisation, expressed distrust over the visit, viewing it as potentially supportive of the Kiram family's territorial claims. The incident prompted debate about her judgement and awareness of Sabah's security sensitivities.

As discussions were underway on potential cooperation within the Pakatan Harapan (PH) coalition, Nurul Izzah told then-Attorney General Tommy Thomas in January 2016 that her family no longer trusted Mahathir due to his past actions against her father and remained sceptical about forming a political alliance with him. In March, she was questioned by the Royal Malaysia Police (RMP) under Section 504 of the Penal Code and Section 233 of the Communications and Multimedia Act 1998 for reposting on Instagram a controversial sketch of Prime Minister Najib Razak as a clown by activist Fahmi Reza; she declined to answer questions, described the investigation as "trivial," and framed it as an act of intimidation intended to encourage self-censorship. In May, she was barred from entering Sarawak to participate in a state election campaign after immigration officials cited a ban on "unsavoury elements" imposed by Chief Minister Adenan Satem, which she described as a restriction on legitimate political activity while highlighting ongoing controversies surrounding Najib and the ruling coalition.

In early 2017, Nurul Izzah was involved in several high-profile political and legal developments reflecting her role as both parliamentarian and reform advocate. In February, the high court rejected the Election Commission's (EC) request to delay a judicial review she and ten voters had filed against proposed constituency redelineation in Peninsular Malaysia, including for her Lembah Pantai seat. In March, she was accused by Tengku Sarifuddin Ahmad, press secretary to Prime Minister Najib, of instigating residents of Kampung Kerinchi to take legal action against the government's 2012 plan to redevelop the Kerinchi public flats. She denied instructing residents to pursue the lawsuit, stating that she had only facilitated dialogue and provided impartial advice to help families evaluate their options. That month, Deputy Prime Minister Muhyiddin Yassin criticised her statement that religious freedom should extend to all, including Malays, as potentially conflicting with Islamic creed. On 31 March, she was arrested under the Sedition Act at Dang Wangi police headquarters over a parliamentary speech condemning her father's earlier sentencing and was later sent to Jalan Thavers police station. On 17 July, she claimed at a rally that PH could deliver a more extensive Mass Rapid Transit network at lower cost while improving services, referring to the RM21 billion Sungai Buloh–Kajang Line inaugurated by Prime Minister Najib. In that same year, she participated in the Foreign and Commonwealth Office's International Leaders Programme.

=== 2018 general election ===
During the 2018 general election, Nurul Izzah contested and won the parliamentary seat for Permatang Pauh in Penang, succeeding her mother. She secured 35,534 votes, defeating BN's Mohd Zaidi Mohd Said and the Malaysian Islamic Party (PAS) candidate Afnan Hamimi, who received 19,866 and 14,428 votes respectively, giving her a majority of 15,668. She stated that she would remain in Permatang Pauh until the end of the term, despite speculation that she might vacate the seat for her father, who had been released from prison on 16 May. In June that year, she was appointed chairperson of the newly formed Technical and Vocational Education and Training (TVET) Empowerment Committee, announced by then-education minister Maszlee Malik.

In May 2018, Nurul Izzah pledged to re-table a motion to abolish the Printing Presses and Publications Act 1984 and to establish a media council for self-regulation, emphasising the need for reforms to support truth and fair criticism in Malaysia's media. In December, she was appointed to the Public Accounts Committee and to one of six new bipartisan parliamentary select committees, serving on the Consideration of Bills Select Committee. On 17 December 2018, she announced her resignation as PKR party vice president and chair of the PKR's Penang chapter, while retaining her role as MP for Permatang Pauh. In July 2019, she was replaced by Ramkarpal Singh as head of the parliamentary Consideration of Bills Select Committee.

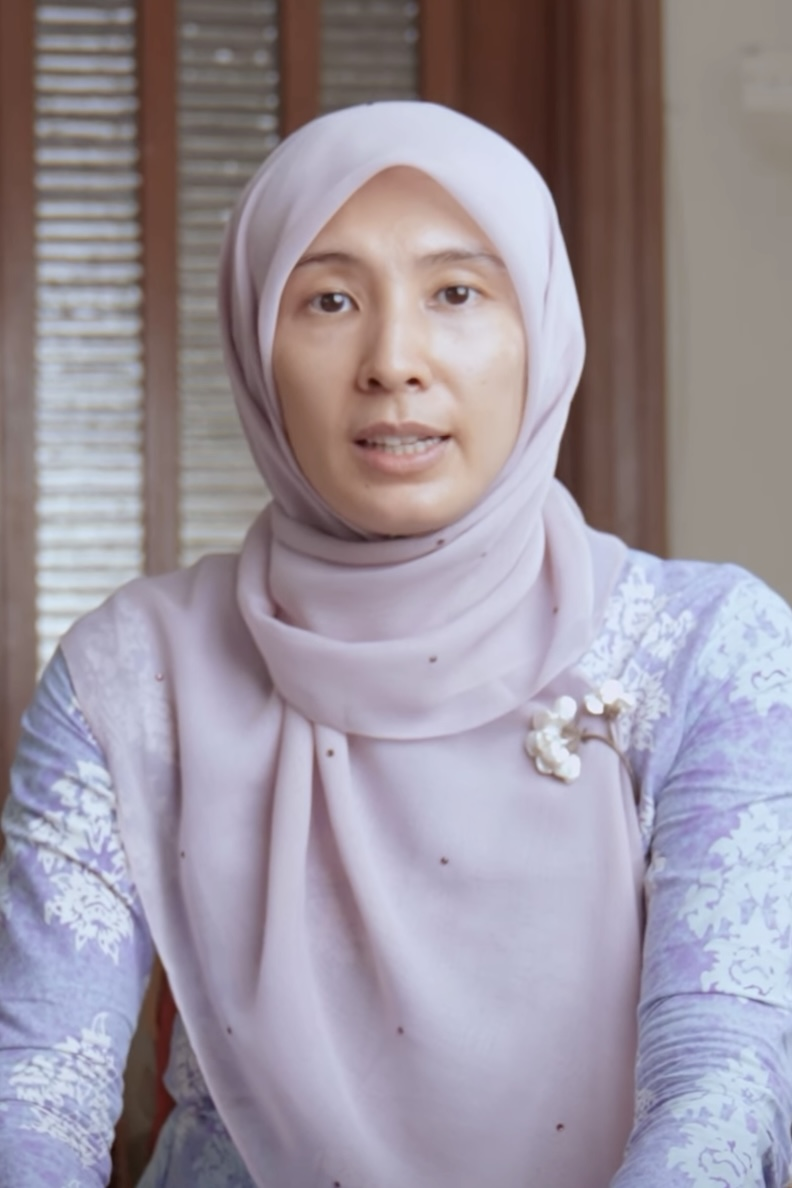
Nurul Izzah urging reforms in RMP's welfare and accountability policies to strengthen institutional integrity, 20 October 2021

In October 2021, Nurul Izzah launched the Permatang Pauh Multidimensional Poverty Index (MPI) Report 2021, developed with economist Fatimah Kari to introduce a comprehensive post-pandemic measure of poverty that better reflects the true scale of deprivation in Malaysia. In that same year, she delivered a keynote address at the UNFPA Malaysia Forum on Intimate Partner Violence, and co-authored an article in the Journal of the Malaysian Parliament on the state of parliamentary democracy.

=== Vice President of PKR (2022–2025) ===
In April 2022, Nurul Izzah announced that she would not contest the PKR elections, stating that she would focus on engaging with fence-sitters ahead of the general election through the Ayuh Malaysia programme she co-founded with Rafizi Ramli. She emphasised her intention to strengthen the party and rebuild public confidence after socio-economic challenges and the political crisis. She was re-appointed as one of the PKR's vice-presidents for the 2022–2025 term on 20 July. In August, she expressed frustration over the government's delay in establishing a central authority for technical and vocational education and training (TVET), noting that she had proposed such a commission in 2018. In the general election on 19 November 2022, she failed to retain her parliamentary seat in Permatang Pauh, receiving 33,366 votes and losing to Muhammad Fawwaz Mohamad Jan of Perikatan Nasional-PAS, who won by a majority of 5,272 votes.

In January 2023, Nurul Izzah was appointed senior economics and finance adviser to her father, Prime Minister Anwar, beginning 3 January in an unpaid capacity. Her appointment came after Anwar formed a government following decades in opposition and multiple imprisonments, marking his return to national leadership. Her duties included consulting on projects to improve the country's economic situation and gathering feedback from the public, particularly the B40 and M40 (bottom and middle 40% income earners) groups, while emphasising the use of talent both inside and outside government. The appointment prompted allegations of nepotism, which she and Anwar denied, with the prime minister noting the role was unpaid and focused on regulating government projects and tenders. In February, she stepped down to join the Secretariat of the Finance Advisory Panel, chaired by Hassan Marican, assisting in economic policy development. In this role, she has also participated in social and economic justice policy initiatives through think tanks such as Social Economic Research Initiatives (SERI) and Polity.

Nurul Izzah completed her tenure at the Secretariat of the Finance Advisory Panel in February 2024. In March 2024, she was appointed chairman of SERI, with a focus on social development and economic equity, including initiatives addressing the needs of vulnerable groups such as the B40 income group and women. In April 2024, she provided advisory support to the Malaysian Humanitarian Aid and Relief. In September, she participated in the forum marking the International Day to Protect Education from Attack in Doha. In November, she joined an overseas government delegation, attending events alongside official visits by Anwar, including the 31st APEC Economic Leaders' Week and the G20 summit; government officials confirmed her participation was in a professional capacity. She served as SERI's chairman until December 2024. In January 2025, she assumed the role of executive chairperson at Polity.

=== Deputy President of PKR (2025–present) ===
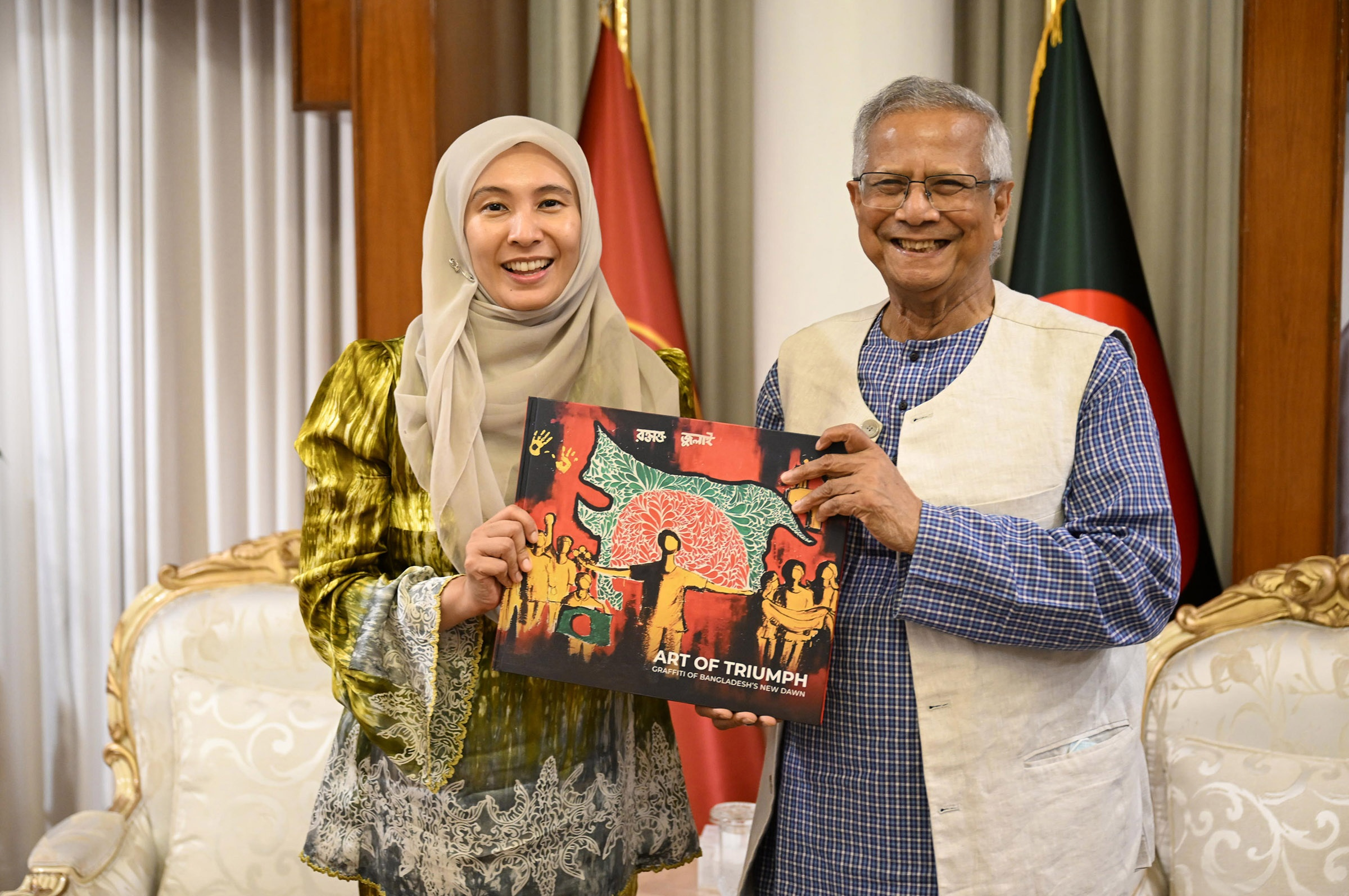
Chief Advisor Muhammad Yunus presents Art of Triumph to Nurul Izzah at State Guest House Jamuna, 27 July 2025

Following the announcement that the office would be contested in the PKR leadership election, Nurul Izzah ran for the PKR deputy presidency in May 2025. Her candidacy emerged amid intra-party tensions, particularly after Rafizi threatened to resign following divisional election losses. She was reportedly supported by over two-thirds of PKR divisions and became Rafizi's strongest challenger. Rafizi's HIRUK campaign criticised the party's treatment of original reformists and leadership accountability, while Nurul Izzah's DAMAI platform emphasised party cohesion and unity. The contest attracted national attention, and she won with 9,803 votes compared to Rafizi's 3,966. She reportedly offered him a role in the new leadership, which he declined. Her position was further consolidated as supporters of her faction retained other senior party roles.

Nurul Izzah formally assumed the PKR deputy presidency on 23 May 2025. Her familial connection to Anwar sparked public discourse and responses regarding nepotism and dynastic politics in Malaysia. Both Nurul Izzah and Anwar dismissed these claims, emphasising that she had secured the position through intra-party elections. As deputy president, she was preoccupied with speaking to PKR grassroots and failed candidates in party polls, calling for unity and involvement by the party for national election results.

On 6 August 2026, PKR announced a significant leadership change involving Nurul Izzah's position as the Deputy President. Nurul Izzah had informed the party leadership that she wanted to step down as the Deputy President. Nurul Izzah said the decision came after lengthy consideration and was connected to her intention to begin a new chapter, including pursuing further studies and continuing to serve society in ways that may not necessarily be tied to politics.

However, the PKR Central Leadership Council (MPP) had discussed her request to resign and, after hearing the views of Nurul Izzah and other party leaders, agreed that she would instead be given temporary leave beginning after the 2026 National Congress until a date to be announced. During this period, Vice President Saifuddin Nasution Ismail would temporarily perform the duties of Deputy President.

In addition, Nurul Izzah made clear that she is not leaving PKR. She said she will remain a party member and continue supporting the party's struggle for a better Malaysia. She also expressed gratitude to President Anwar, the leadership, members and supporters who had worked with her throughout her political journey.

She is also still expected to participate in the upcoming party congress. According to the official party statement, she will officiate the PKR Women's Wing and Youth Wing congresses on 14 August 2026, and she said she would meet party members again during the PLR National Congress on 14 and 15 August 2026.

== Activism and advocacy ==
Nurul Izzah advocated for greater political participation by women to strengthen legal protections for women and families in Malaysia. She engaged in civil rights and policy reform campaigns, including national prison reform as a member of the All Party Parliamentary Group for the Reform of All Places of Detention, and promoted parliamentary reforms such as a central authority for TVET with emphasis on public accountability and feedback from lower- and middle-income groups. She introduced seven private member's bills covering racial and religious hate crimes, the repeal of the Sedition Act, amendments to the Petroleum Development Act, and media regulation. As Permatang Pauh MP, she participated in projects on public health, women's vocational development, and poverty studies, while also advocating for greater recognition of technical and vocational skills and qualifications.

Nurul Izzah has been active in supporting Palestinian rights. She has called for an end to the Israeli occupation of Palestinian territories. On 20 October 2023, she and the Malaysian Women's Coalition for Al-Quds and Palestine submitted a protest note to the United States embassy in Kuala Lumpur, advocating for a resolution to the Israeli–Palestinian conflict. Later that year, on 8 December, together with the Malaysian Parliament Caucus for Palestine, she submitted protest notes concerning the Gaza conflict to the embassies of the United States, the European Union, and the British High Commissioner. The notes were signed by 38 MPs, 30 NGOs, and political activists. In 2025, she addressed domestic concerns, emphasising the need for visionary, locally rooted leadership in Sabah to tackle infrastructure, citizenship, and governance issues, and called for accountability over the interception of the Freedom Flotilla, condemnation of the Gaza siege, and lifting of the blockade. She also urged careful consultation with experts and stakeholders regarding the potential reintroduction of corporal punishment in schools following a fatal incident in Bandar Utama.

== Personal life ==
=== Marriages and children ===
On 9 May 2003, 23-year-old Nurul Izzah married Raja Ahmad Shahrir Iskandar, a 26-year-old chemical engineer and distant relative of the Johor royal family. The couple met in 1999 when Nurul Izzah travelled to London to rally Malaysian students in support of her father; Raja Ahmad was then a student at Cambridge. Both partners began living apart on 17 April 2013, after marital issues first surfaced in 2005. In late December 2013, Nurul Izzah filed for divorce at the Lower Syariah Court, citing marital stress. A reconciliation committee was established when the case was initially brought up before a Syariah judge on 21 January 2014, but its attempts were unsuccessful. The court subsequently scheduled a follow-up meeting for 7 August 2014, to discuss the appointment of arbitrators (Hakam) or the continuation of the proceedings. In the end, the couple went forward with the divorce. They were granted joint custody of their two children, Raja Safiyah and Raja Harith.

On 5 August 2022, Nurul Izzah married Yin Shao Loong in an intimate ceremony in Kuala Lumpur, attended by close friends and family. The couple had kept their relationship largely out of the public eye, with only close relatives and trusted circles aware prior to the wedding. On 25 January 2023, she shared on social media that she had suffered a miscarriage. In June 2025, Nurul Izzah and Yin performed the hajj pilgrimage together.

=== Interests ===
Outside of politics, Nurul Izzah likes to study books about politics and society, including Democracy in Iran: History and the Quest for Liberty and Memerdekakan Rakyat Memerdekakan Sendiri. She also likes music and movies, and she says she likes bands like Radiohead, The Strokes, and The Killers, as well as performers like Julianne Moore and Johnny Depp. For spiritual grounding, Nurul Izzah enjoys rock music and Quranic recitations. She loves simplicity and genuineness in her familial ties and looks up to strong, resilient people like Aung San Suu Kyi. She enjoys swimming in her spare time and maintains that self-esteem inevitably leads to attractive appearance.
