= Consideration of Bills Select Committee (Malaysia) =

Committee appointed by the Malaysian House of Representatives

The Consideration of Bills Select Committee (Malay: Jawatankuasa Pilihan Khas Menimbang Rang Undang-Undang; Chinese: 馬來西亞審議法案專責委員會; Tamil: மலேசியா மறுஆய்வு பில்கள் தேர்வுக் குழு) is a select committee of the Malaysian House of Representatives, which scrutinises bills. It is among six new bipartisan parliamentary select committees announced by Speaker of the House of Representatives, Mohamad Ariff Md Yusof, on 4 December 2018 in an effort to improve the institutional system.

== Membership ==
=== 14th Parliament ===
As of December 2019, the Committee's current members are as follows:

Member	Party	Constituency
Ramkarpal Singh Karpal Singh MP (Chairman)	DAP	Bukit Gelugor
Rusnah Aluai MP	PKR	Tangga Batu
Willie Mongin MP	PPBM	Puncak Borneo
Azalina Othman Said MP	UMNO	Pengerang
Thomas Keong Siong Su MP	DAP	Kampar
Wilfred Madius Tangau MP	UPKO	Tuaran
Wan Junaidi Tuanku Jaafar MP	PBB	Santubong

Former members of the committee are as follows:

Member	Party	Constituency	Successor
Larry Soon MP	PKR	Julau	Willie Mongin

== Chair of the Consideration of Bills Select Committee ==
Chair	Party	Constituency	First elected	Method
Nurul Izzah Anwar	PKR	Permatang Pauh	4 December 2018	Elected by the Speaker of the House of Representatives
Ramkarpal Singh Karpal Singh	DAP	Bukit Gelugor	18 July 2019	Elected by the Speaker of the House of Representatives

== See also ==
- Parliamentary Committees of Malaysia
