= List of Malaysian politicians of Indian descent =

This is a list of notable Malaysian politicians of Tamil origin, including original immigrants who obtained Malaysian citizenship and their Malaysian descendants. Entries on this list are demonstrably notable by having a linked current article or reliable sources as footnotes against the name to verify they are notable and define themselves either full or partial Indian origin, whose ethnic origin lie in India.

This list also includes emigrant Malaysian politicians of Indian origin and could be taken as a list of famous Malaysian politicians of Indian origin.

== List ==
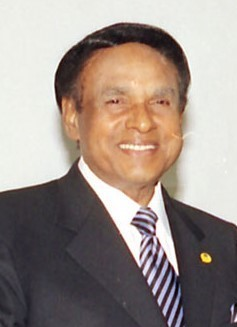
Samy Vellu

- Abdul Azeez Abdul Rahim
- Dr. Ali Hamsa
- Ananthan Somasundaram
- Andrew David
- Arul Kumar Jambunathan
- Arumugam Vengatarakoo
- Charles Anthony Santiago
- D. R. Seenivasagam
- D. S. Ramanathan
- Danyal Balagopal Abdullah
- Devaki Krishnan
- Devamany Krishnasamy
- Devan Nair
- Edmund Santhara Kumar Ramanaidu
- G. Saminathan
- Ganabathy Rao @ Ganabatirau Veraman
- Ganga Nayar
- Gladwin Kotelawala
- Gobalakrishnan Nagapan
- Gobind Singh Deo
- Gopalakrishnan Subramaniam
- Gunarajah George
- Gunasekaren Palasamy
- Irwan Serigar Abdullah
- Jagdeep Singh Deo
- Janil Puthucheary
- John Fernandez
- John Aloysius Thivy
- Karpal Singh
- K. L. Devaser
- Parthiban Karuppiah
- K. Pathmanaban
- Karnail Singh Nijhar
- Kamache Doray Rajoo
- Karuppaiya Muthusamy
- Kasthuriraani Patto
- Kesavan Subramaniam
- Krishnamoorthy Rajannaidu
- Kulasegaran Murugeson
- Kumaresan Arumugam
- Kumutha Rahman
- Mary Josephine Pritam Singh
- M. G. Pandithan
- M. Kayveas
- Manogaran Marimuthu
- Manoharan Malayalam
- Manickam Letchuman
- Manikumar Subramaniam
- Manivannan Gowindasamy
- Michael Jeyakumar Devaraj
- N. Surendran
- N. K. Menon
- Normala Abdul Samad
- Nor Mohamed Yakcop
- Palanivel Govindasamy
- P. Kamalanathan
- P. Patto
- Prabakaran Parameswaran
- Rajiv Rishyakaran
- Ramanan Ramakrishnan
- Ramasamy Palanisamy
- Ramkarpal Singh
- Raven Kumar Krishnasamy
- Ravi Munusamy
- Reezal Merican Naina Merican
- R.S. Thanenthiran
- Krishnasamy Shiman
- Manikavasagam Sundram
- Sanisvara Nethaji Rayer Rajaji Rayer
- S. Sothinathan
- Samy Vellu
- Saravanan Murugan
- Satees Muniandy
- Shanmugam Ptcyhay
- Sivalingam Arumugam
- Sivanesan Achalingam
- Sivarraajh Chandran
- Sivarasa Rasiah
- Sivasubramaniam Athinarayanan
- Subramaniam Sathasivam
- Summugam Rengasamy
- Tanasekharan Autherapady
- Terence Naidu Raja Naidu
- Vadiveloo Govindasamy
- V. David
- V. Manickavasagam
- Sivakumar Varatharaju
- V. T. Sambanthan
- Veerappen Veerathan
- Veerapan Superamaniam
- Vidyananthan Ramanadhan
- Vigneswaran M. Sanasee
- Xavier Jayakumar Arulanandam
- Zambry Abdul Kadir
- S.O.K Ubaidullah

== See also ==
- List of politicians of Indian descent § Malaysia
