= Domestic partnership =

Relationship between two people who live together but are not married

A domestic partnership is an intimate relationship between people, usually couples, who live together and share a common domestic life but who are not married (to each other or to anyone else). In some jurisdictions, people in domestic partnerships receive legal benefits that guarantee right of survivorship, hospital visitation, and other rights.

The term is not used consistently, which results in some inter-jurisdictional confusion. Some jurisdictions, such as Australia, New Zealand, and the U.S. states of California, Maine, Nevada, Oregon and Washington use the term "domestic partnership" to mean what other jurisdictions call civil union, civil partnership, or registered partnership. Other jurisdictions use the term as it was originally coined, to mean an interpersonal status created by local municipal and county governments, which provides an extremely limited range of rights and responsibilities.

Some legislatures have voluntarily established domestic partnership relations by statute instead of being ordered to do so by a court. Although some jurisdictions have instituted domestic partnerships as a way to recognize same-sex marriage, statutes do exist which provide for recognition of opposite-sex domestic partnerships in many jurisdictions.

In some legal jurisdictions, domestic partners who live together for an extended period of time but are not legally entitled to common-law marriage may be entitled to legal protection in the form of a domestic partnership. Some domestic partners may enter into nonmarital relationship contracts in order to agree, either verbally or in writing, to issues involving property ownership, support obligations, and similar issues common to marriage. (See effects of marriage and palimony.) Beyond agreements, registration of relationships in domestic partnership registries allow for the jurisdiction to formally acknowledge domestic partnerships as valid relationships with limited rights.

== Overview ==
Although the terms are sometimes used interchangeably, a domestic partnership, same-sex marriage and civil union are each separate and distinct legal concepts in some jurisdictions. The domestic partnership is a legal relationship between two people of the same or opposite sex who live together and share a domestic life, but are not married or joined by a civil union nor are blood relatives. It may be established by contract between the parties, but more often by registration according to procedures established by a state or municipal government. Where recognized, benefits granted under a domestic partnership vary among different jurisdictions. Some accord full health benefits, others only a right of visitation. In still other jurisdictions, registered domestic partners are accorded a legal status similar to that of a married person with respect to matters of probate, guardianships, conservatorships, inheritance, protection from abuse, and related matters.

Since the 2015 US Supreme Court's decision legalizing same-sex marriage, there have been fewer US domestic partnerships registered, but in many jurisdictions they are still allowed for couples of the same gender or different genders who do not want to marry but still would like to be eligible for certain benefits. Many couples opt for a domestic partnership after comparing the potential tax consequences of being married.

== In the United States ==
State laws regarding same-sex unions similar to marriage in the United States^{1} Domestic partnerships or civil unions granting state privileges of marriage^{2} Domestic partnerships granting limited/enumerated privileges No same-sex unions similar to marriage Same-sex unions similar to marriage banned Same-sex and opposite-sex unions similar to marriage banned^{1}Not recognized by the federal government. However, same-sex marriage is legal nationwide (excluding some territories and Native American tribal jurisdictions) and is recognized by the federal government. Same-sex unions similar to marriage are provided at the local level in many jurisdictions.^{2}Domestic partnerships in Washington are only available when at least one of the partners is 62 years of age or older.

Laws regarding same-sex partnerships similar to marriage by state, county, and local level in the United States^{1} Same-sex unions similar to marriage^{2} Domestic partnership granting limited/enumerated privileges State grants benefits to state employees Same-sex unions not provided^{1}Not recognized by the federal government. However, same-sex marriage is legal nationwide (excluding some territories and Native American tribal jurisdictions) and is recognized by the federal government.^{2}Domestic partnerships in Washington are only available when at least one of the partners is 62 years of age or older.

=== Origin of term in Californian municipalities ===
In August 1979, gay rights activist Tom Brougham proposed a new category of relationship called "domestic partnership". Initially, the requirements were that only two people who resided together and were qualified to marry except that they were the same gender. Additional requirements were later added for the partners to maintain mutual financial responsibility and for both to be at least eighteen years old and able to enter into a legal contract.

==== San Francisco ====
In 1982, Brougham's definition was modified by Supervisor Harry Britt, a gay man appointed to replace Harvey Milk. Britt's version was adopted and passed by the San Francisco Board of Supervisors, but Dianne Feinstein, mayor of San Francisco at the time, came under intense pressure from the Catholic Church and vetoed the bill. In 1989, a domestic partnership law was adopted in San Francisco. However, voters repealed the domestic partnership law by initiative; a modified version was reinstated by another voter initiative, 1990's Proposition K, also written by Britt. Currently, the city still offers a domestic partnership status separate and differing in benefits from that offered by the state; city residents can apply for both.

According to the San Francisco Human Rights Commission, "In 1982, the term 'domestic partner' was first used in a lawsuit filed by San Francisco Human Rights Commission employee Larry Brinkin. Mr. Brinkin, then an employee of Southern Pacific Railway, had recently suffered the loss of his partner of eleven years. When he was denied the three days of paid bereavement leave given to married employees, he filed suit with the assistance of the ACLU. Mr. Brinkin lost his case. Despite a great deal of evidence to the contrary, the judge agreed with his employer's claim that there was no way to know if his relationship was legitimate."

==== Berkeley ====
In 1983, the City Council of Berkeley, California, under the leadership of Mayor Gus Newport, ordered their Human Relations and Welfare Commission to develop a domestic partnership proposal. The Commission appointed its vice-chair, Leland Traiman, a gay activist, to head the Domestic Partner Task Force and draft a policy. Working with Tom Brougham, members of the East Bay Lesbian/Gay Democratic Club, and attorney Matt Coles, the Domestic Partner Task Force drafted what has become the template for domestic partner/civil union policies around the world. The City of Berkeley's Human Relations and Welfare Commission held a public hearing early in 1984 on "Examining the Use of Marriage to Determine Benefits and Liabilities in Berkeley and the Alternatives". A policy was adopted by the commission and presented to the City Council. A copy was sent to the Berkeley School Board. In July 1984 the City Council voted down the proposal citing financial concerns. On August 1, 1984, the Berkeley School Board enacted the policy by a 4 to 1 vote. The school board motion was made by board member and community activist Ethel Manheimer.

In November 1984, all the city council members up for election who had voted against the policy lost reelection. Progressives from the Berkeley Citizens' Action (BCA) slate who replaced them had voiced strong support for a domestic partner policy. The East Bay Lesbian/Gay Democratic Club had worked hard to elect the BCA Slate. This was the first time domestic partners was a campaign issue. At the first meeting of the new City Council in December 1984, the Berkeley City Council enacted a policy extending employee benefits to unmarried couples of any gender. The first couple to file for benefits under Berkeley's sex-neutral policy were Brougham and his partner Barry Warren.

However, the City Council did not create a registry for domestic partners until 1991. On October 11 of that year, 28 lesbian and gay male couples and one heterosexual couple registered their partnerships. The registry and benefits were also extended to non-resident couples that same year.

==== West Hollywood ====
In 1985, West Hollywood city council member John Heilman successfully introduced domestic partner legislation for city residents and employees that was passed by the city council and created the first domestic partnership registry.

In 2026, West Hollywood created a domestic partnership registry recognizing polyamorous relationships.

=== Statewide ===
==== California ====
California created the first state-level domestic partnership in the United States in 1999. Since 2020, domestic partnerships are legally available to all couples consisting of any two people over 18 years old, regardless of gender.

On September 4, 2003, the California legislature passed an expanded domestic partnership bill, extending all of the state legal rights and responsibilities of marriage to people in state domestic partnerships. California's comprehensive domestic partner legislation was the first same-sex couples policy in the United States created by a legislature without a court order. The legislation became effective January 1, 2005.

Pre-existing municipal and county domestic partnership ordinances remain in force unless repealed by their local governments. Thus, residents of San Francisco, West Hollywood, and a few other locations may choose between a local domestic partnership, a California domestic partnership, or marriage. Nothing in either the 1999 or 2003 domestic partnership legislation applies to any of the municipal or county domestic partnership ordinances, whose scopes are extremely limited and are not portable outside of the jurisdiction that issued them.

The State of California has developed an Online Self-Help Center that provides resources and information to assist domestic partners in many areas, including filing domestic partnerships, dissolving domestic partnerships, parenting issues, tax issues, and more.

==== Colorado ====
Since July 1, 2009 unmarried couples have been legally able to enter a designated beneficiary agreement which will grant them limited rights. A law on civil unions went into effect on May 1, 2013.

==== District of Columbia ====
Washington, D.C., has recognized domestic partnerships since 1992. However, Congress prohibited the District from spending any local funds to implement the law. The prohibition was lifted in the federal appropriations act for the District for the 2002 fiscal year. Domestic partnership in the District is open to both same-sex and opposite-sex couples. All couples registered as domestic partners are entitled to the same rights as family members to visit their domestic partners in the hospital and to make decisions concerning the treatment of a domestic partner's remains after the partner's death. The measure also grants District of Columbia government employees rights to a number of benefits. Domestic partners are eligible for health care insurance coverage, can use annual leave or unpaid leave for the birth or adoption of a dependent child or to care for a domestic partner or a partner's dependents, and can make funeral arrangements for a deceased partner. The Domestic Partnership Equality Amendment Act of 2006, D.C. Law 16-79, came into effect on April 4, 2006. This act provides that in almost all cases a domestic partner will have the same rights as a spouse regarding inheritance, probate, guardianship, and other rights traditionally accorded to spouses. D.C. Council on May 6, 2008, approved the addition of 39 new provisions to the city's domestic partners law, bringing the law to a point where same-sex couples who register as domestic partners will receive most, but not quite all, of the rights and benefits of marriage under District law.

==== Hawaii ====
Reciprocal beneficiary registration was enacted in 1997. The law took effect on June 1, 1997.

==== Illinois ====
The Village of Oak Park, Illinois in October 1997 began offering a domestic partnership registry for same-sex couples, according to a Chicago Tribune article by Joanne von Alroth. Largely symbolic, the registry was the first of its kind in the state, and it required couples to swear that they were in committed relationships of at least six months. Oak Park's Village Board had approved the registry at a meeting in September 1997.

==== Maine ====
In April 2004 the legislature passed a domestic partnership bill. The law, which provides same-sex individuals with inheritance rights over their partners' property and guardianship over their deceased partner, went into effect on July 30, 2004. On May 6, 2009, Maine's legislature and governor enacted a law to legalize same-sex marriage, but on November 3, 2009, that law was repealed by voters. Maine legalized same-sex marriage in December 2012.

==== Maryland ====
Since July 1, 2008, unmarried couples have been able to enter a designated unregistered beneficiary agreement which will grant them limited rights such as the right to visit one another in the hospital, the right to share a room in a nursing home, and the right to make funeral decisions. A law on same-sex marriage went into effect on January 1, 2013.

==== Nevada ====
In Nevada domestic partnerships are granted all the benefits, rights, obligations and/or responsibilities of marriage (for any two adults over 18, regardless of gender) and these have become legally available since October 1, 2009. The act specifically excludes requiring any entity to provide health benefits to domestic partners. In addition, due to vagueness in the verbiage of the act, most companies and entities within Nevada refuse to acknowledge or afford any major benefits or rights to registered domestic partners, leaving legal action as the only avenue to garner individual rights.

==== New Jersey ====
Domestic partnerships in New Jersey have been available since July 30, 2004 for same-sex couples, and for opposite-sex couples in which both people are above the age of 62. However, on October 25, 2006, the Supreme Court of New Jersey ruled that under the New Jersey state constitution, the state could not deny the benefits of marriage to same-sex couples, although the court left it up to the legislature whether to call such relationships marriage or to use a different term. Complying with the court's ruling, on December 14, 2006, the New Jersey Legislature passed a bill establishing civil unions for same-sex couples, which was signed into law by the governor on December 21 and came into effect on February 19, 2007.

==== Oregon ====
The governor of Oregon, Ted Kulongoski, signed a domestic partnership bill into law on May 9, 2007. Called the Oregon Family Fairness Act, the law would provide several major rights to same-sex couples that were previously only given to married couples, including the ability to file jointly on insurance forms, hospital visitation rights, and rights relating to the deceased partner. The law's initial implementation was delayed by a federal Court, but the injunction was lifted on February 1, 2008, and the law went into effect on February 4.

==== Washington ====
In the state of Washington, Governor Christine Gregoire signed into law legislation allowing limited domestic partnership on April 21, 2007. The law, which took effect July 22, 2007 and expanded to all areas except for marriage in 2008 and 2009, permits same-sex couples (as well as heterosexual couples when one individual is at least age 62) to register in a domestic partnership registry that allows couples hospital visitation rights, the ability to authorize autopsies and organ donations, and inheritance rights when there is no will. This follows the 1998 passage of a bill by the Washington State legislature that defined marriage as being between a man and a woman; this legislation was upheld by the Washington State Supreme Court in 2006.

Same-sex marriage was legalized in Washington with effect from December 6, 2012. As a result, the domestic partnership law was amended so that from June 30, 2014, domestic partnerships will be available only when at least one of the partners is sixty-two years of age or older.

==== Wisconsin ====
Wisconsin was the first state in the Midwest to legislatively enact same-sex unions. Out of about thirty states that have bans on same-sex marriage and civil unions, Wisconsin was the first (and only) to enact domestic partnerships.

On March 5, 2009, Wisconsin Governor Jim Doyle proposed legislation for same-sex partnerships in Wisconsin.

In June 2009, the Wisconsin State Assembly and Senate both passed the biennial state budget which includes domestic partnership protections for the state's same-sex couples.

On June 29, 2009, Governor Jim Doyle signed the budget, giving final approval to limited domestic partnership benefits for same-sex couples living in Wisconsin.

On July 23, 2009, three members of Wisconsin Family Action filed a petition for an original action in the Wisconsin Supreme Court, seeking a declaration that the domestic partner registry is unconstitutional under the state's Marriage Protection Amendment.

The law went into effect on August 3, 2009.

November 4, 2009: The Wisconsin Supreme Court rejected Appling v. Doyle, Wisconsin Family Action's legal challenge to domestic partnerships.

May 13, 2011: Governor Scott Walker asked to withdraw the state's defense of the domestic partnership registry.

June 20, 2011: Dane County Judge Dan Moeser ruled that the domestic partnership registry does not violate the state constitution, finding that the state "does not recognize domestic partnership in a way that even remotely resembles how the state recognizes marriage".

Wisconsin ended its domestic partnership registry on April 1, 2018.

==== Other states ====
Many states recognize through their judicial systems cohabitation agreements and common law partner agreements concluded between two partners in a relationship. These are de facto domestic partnerships that protect both parties and allow for shared property and court recognition of their relationships.

Sometimes adult adoption by gay couples creates a de jure domestic partnership in all 50 states.

=== Local level ===
In June 2020, the city council of Somerville, Massachusetts, voted to recognize polyamorous domestic partnerships in the city, becoming the first American city to do so. This measure was passed so that those in a polyamorous relationship would have access to their partners' health insurance amid the COVID-19 pandemic.

In March 2021, the Cambridge, Massachusetts City Council approved an ordinance amending the city's laws, stipulating that "a domestic partnership needn't only include two partners." In April 2021, the adjacent town of Arlington, Massachusetts, approved domestic partnerships of more than two people through a motion at Town Meeting. Any motion approved at Arlington's Town Meeting is subject to review and approval from the state Attorney General's office; by early January 2022 that office (the office of Maura Healey) approved it.

In 2026, West Hollywood created a domestic partnership registry recognizing polyamorous relationships.

=== United States Military ===
On February 11, 2013, Secretary of Defense Leon Panetta submitted a memorandum (subject: Extending Benefits to Same-Sex Domestic Partners of Military Members) that outlined benefits that would be made available to service members in domestic partnerships. The newly listed benefits available to gay and lesbian service members was to include:

- Dependant ID Cards
- Commissary privileges
- Exchange privileges
- Morale, Welfare, and Recreation (MWR) privileges
- Surveys of Military Families
- Quadrennial Quality of Life Review
- Emergency Leave
- Emergency Leave of Absence
- Youth Sponsorship Program
- Youth Programs
- Family Center Programs
- Sexual Assault Counselling Program
- Joint Duty Assignments
- Exemption from Hostile-Fire Areas
- Transportation to and from certain places of employment and on military installations, as well as primary and secondary school for dependants
- Authority of Service Secretary to Transport Remains of a Dependant
- Disability and Death Compensation: Dependants of Members Held as Captives
- Payments to Missing Persons
- Space-Available Travel on DoD Aircraft
- Child Care
- Legal Assistance

Implementation of the plan was cancelled once the Supreme Court handed down its opinion in United States v. Windsor.

== In Europe ==
In France since 1968, article 515-81 of Code civil defines domestic partnership (in French: concubinage or concubinage notoire) as a de facto union between two persons, of different sex or of same sex, characterised by a stable and continuous cohabitation and partnership. The French fiscal administration takes it into account in the calculation of the solidarity tax on wealth but not for other purposes. All children enjoy equal right whether within or outside wedlock. Since 1999 French law also provides for a civil solidarity pact (in French: pacte civil de solidarité, or PACS), a contractual form of civil union between two adults bringing additional rights and responsibilities, but less so than marriage.

Hungary has registered partnerships for same-sex partners, which afford rights similar to marriage. Croatia also had unregistered partnerships until June 2014 when the Croatian parliament passed a law allowing life partnerships for same-sex couples giving them the same rights married couples do have.

In Hungary, since 1995 domestic partnership in the form of unregistered cohabitation offers a limited set of rights compared to marriage in a Civil Code (more in the field of health and pension; but no inheritance), although a growing number of Hungarian couples, both opposite-sex couples and same-sex couples choose this kind of partnership instead of marriage. In April 2009, the Hungarian Parliament passed a Registration Partnership Act 2009 with a vote of 199–159, which provides a registered partnership for same-sex couples with all the benefits and entitlements of marriage (except for marriage itself, adoption, IVF access, taking a partner's surname, parentage and surrogacy). The law was passed in December 2007 by a vote of 110–78, but the Constitutional Court of Hungary was "deeply concerned" that the law was a duplication of opposite-sex marriage benefits and entitlements, so same-sex couples only registration was chosen. Some politicians of the Alliance of Free Democrats and Hungarian Socialist Party parties have argued for the introduction of marriage for same-sex couples. The Registration Partnership Act 2009 came into effect from July 1, 2009.

== In Oceania ==
=== Australia ===
Since January 9, 2018 same-sex marriage became legal throughout Australia. Since July 1, 2009, Australia also recognises de facto relationships for all couples of any sex.

- Australian Capital Territory (domestic relationship status provided from 1994 and Civil partnership provided since 2008).
- Commonwealth (federal Government of Australia provides both a de facto and registered relationship since 2009).
- New South Wales (de facto status provided since 1999, expanded further in 2002, 2005 and 2008).
- Norfolk Island (de facto status provided from 2006).
- Northern Territory (de facto status provided since 2003).
- Queensland (de facto status provided since 1999, expanded further in 2002).
- South Australia (domestic relationship status provided since 2007).
- Tasmania (de facto status provided from 2003, "Registry system/Significant Relationships" provided since 2004) Recognition of same-sex unions in Tasmania
- Victoria (domestic relationship status provided since 2001 and a "registry system" has been provided since 2008).
- Western Australia (de facto status provided since 2002).

=== New Zealand ===
In 2001, the Property (Relationships) Act 1976 was extended to offer partners in unregistered "de facto" relationships similar rights to those of married couples. A de facto relationship is defined as a relationship between two persons living as a couple, who are not married or in a civil union. This applies to both heterosexual and same sex couples. Since 2013, same-sex marriage is legally recognised and performed within New Zealand.

== See also ==
- Cohabitation
- Civil marriage
- Civil union
- Concubinage
- Free union
- Common-law marriage
- Same-sex marriage
  - Same-sex marriage in California
