= Lim Boo Chang =

Malaysian politician

Lim Boo Chang DJN KMN
- 林武灿

Member of the Penang State Legislative Assembly for Datok Keramat
- In office 25 April 1995 – 21 March 2004
- Preceded by: K. Balasundaram (GR–DAP)
- Succeeded by: Ong Thean Lye (BN–Gerakan)
- Majority: 5,293 (1995); 3,148 (1999)

Personal details
- Born: 26 November 1955 (age 70) Penang, Federation of Malaya (now Malaysia)
- Party: Parti Gerakan Rakyat Malaysia (Gerakan) (1984–1999); Malaysian Chinese Association (MCA) (1999–2008); People's Justice Party (PKR) (2008–2011); Independent (2011–2016); Malaysian United Party (MUP) (2016–present)
- Education: North East London Polytechnic, Lincoln's Inn, Nanjing University
- Occupation: Politician, lawyer

Lim Boo Chang

Chinese name
- Traditional Chinese: 林武燦
- Hanyu Pinyin: Lín Wú Chán
- Jyutping: Lam4 Mou5 Caan3
- Hokkien POJ: Lîm Bú-chhàn
- Tâi-lô: Lîm Bú-tshàn

Lim Boo Chang (born 26 November 1955; simplified Chinese: 林武灿; traditional Chinese: 林武燦; Jyutping: Lam4 Mou5 Caan3; Pe̍h-ōe-jī: Lîm Bú-chhàn; pinyin: Lín Wú Chán) is a Malaysian politician.

== Educations ==
He obtained three separate academic achievements: Bachelor of Science in Applied Economics from North East London Polytechnic in 1981; Barrister-at-law from Lincoln's Inn in 1984; and Master of Literature from Nanjing University in 2006.

== Politics ==
He was appointed to serve as a Penang Island Municipal Councillor from 1990 to 1995. He was elected and served for two consecutive terms as the Penang State Legislative Assemblyman of Datok Keramat from 1995 to 1999, and from 1999 to 2004.

Lim is the son of Datuk Lim Ee Heong, a veteran politician who helped Tun Dr Lim Chong Eu in the formation of Parti Gerakan Rakyat Malaysia (GERAKAN), which took over the Penang state government in 1969 from the then Alliance Party. He followed his father's footstep and joined Gerakan in 1984 upon his return from United Kingdom after being called to the English Bar. Subsequently, he was elected as its National Youth Chairman and thus as ex officio vice-president of Gerakan (1993–1996).

On 3 December 1999, he and Lim Chien Aun; who is Tun Dr Lim's son resigned from Gerakan after they just won in the 10th 1999 Malaysian general election as its candidates to be the Penang state legislative assemblymen five days earlier to join Malaysian Chinese Association (MCA).

In December 2002, his party membership was suspended indefinitely by MCA for abstaining in voting on the opposition party DAP's motion to suspend the controversial Penang Outer Ring Road project. The suspension was later on lifted in September 2003, a few months before the Malaysian 11th General Elections.

He resigned from MCA on 4 April 2008. He becomes a political commentator and maintaining his own blog since 19 April 2008 via www.limboochang.com. He joined the People's Justice Party (or Parti Keadilan Rakyat, PKR) with his membership officially announced by the de facto leader of that Party, Dato' Seri Anwar Ibrahim in Penang on 15 June 2008. He was announced as the Bukit Gelugor PKR division chief in October 2010.

He resigned from PKR on 14 December 2011 over his disagreement with the party's policy in the party's policy in the Penang Island Municipal Council. He eyed to return to GERAKAN but the party was reluctant to accept him back.

Lim was one of the three founding Vice Presidents for the new Penang-based party, Malaysian United Party (MUP) established on 2 December 2016 to provide check and balance on both the ruling and opposition parties.

== Books ==
Lim wrote two books on politics in Mandarin. One on his experience in Gerakan called "The Cross-Section" in August 1996 (ISBN 983-99150-0-2), and the other which is based on his Master thesis on the MCA titled "Towards a Participatory Model of Political Culture- A Treatise on the MCA's Development" in July 2005 (ISBN 983-42670-0-2).

== Election results ==
Parliament of Malaysia
Year	Constituency	Candidate	Votes	Pct	Opponent(s)	Votes	Pct	Ballots cast	Majority	Turnout
1986	P046 Jelutong	Lim Boo Chang (Gerakan)	15,833	37.91%	Karpal Singh Ram Singh (DAP)	25,932	62.09%	42,723	10,099	71.34%
2004	P051 Bukit Gelugor	Lim Boo Chang (MCA)	21,268	48.56%	Karpal Singh Ram Singh (DAP)	22,529	51.44%	44,618	1,261	74.21%

Penang State Legislative Assembly
Year	Constituency	Candidate	Votes	Pct	Opponent(s)	Votes	Pct	Ballots cast	Majority	Turnout
1995	N25 Datok Keramat	Lim Boo Chang (Gerakan)	9,974	66.33%	Wong Hang Yoke (DAP)	4,681	31.13%	15,038	5,293	74.21%
1995	N25 Datok Keramat	Lim Boo Chang (Gerakan)	9,974	66.33%	Seevaraju Muniandy (PBS)	96	0.64%	15,038	5,293	74.21%
1999	N25 Datok Keramat	Lim Boo Chang (Gerakan)	8,599	59.60%	Karpal Singh Ram Singh (DAP)	5,451	37.78%	14,427	3,148	72.04%
2018	N29 Datok Keramat	Lim Boo Chang (MUP)	194	1.10%	Jagdeep Singh Deo (DAP)	13,712	75.30%	18,504	9,561	81.80%
2018	N29 Datok Keramat	Lim Boo Chang (MUP)	194	1.10%	Lee Boon Ten (Gerakan)	4,151	22.80%	18,504	9,561	81.80%
2018	N29 Datok Keramat	Lim Boo Chang (MUP)	194	1.10%	Muhd Majnun Abd Wahab (IND)	146	0.80%	18,504	9,561	81.80%
2018	N29 Datok Keramat	Lim Boo Chang (MUP)	194	1.10%	Nicholas Diane Morgan (PFP)	18	0.10%	18,504	9,561	81.80%

== Honours ==
Lim was conferred the federal award of Kesatria Mangku Negara (K.M.N.) by the Yang di-Pertuan Agong in 2006. It does not carry any title.

- Malaysia
  - Officer of the Order of the Defender of the Realm (KMN) (2006)
- Penang
  - Member of the Order of the Defender of State (DJN) (2009)
