= Karpal Singh =

Malaysian politician and lawyer (1940–2014)

Yang Berbahagia Dato' Seri Utama Karpal Singh DUPN
- ਕਰਪਾਲ ਸਿੰਘ
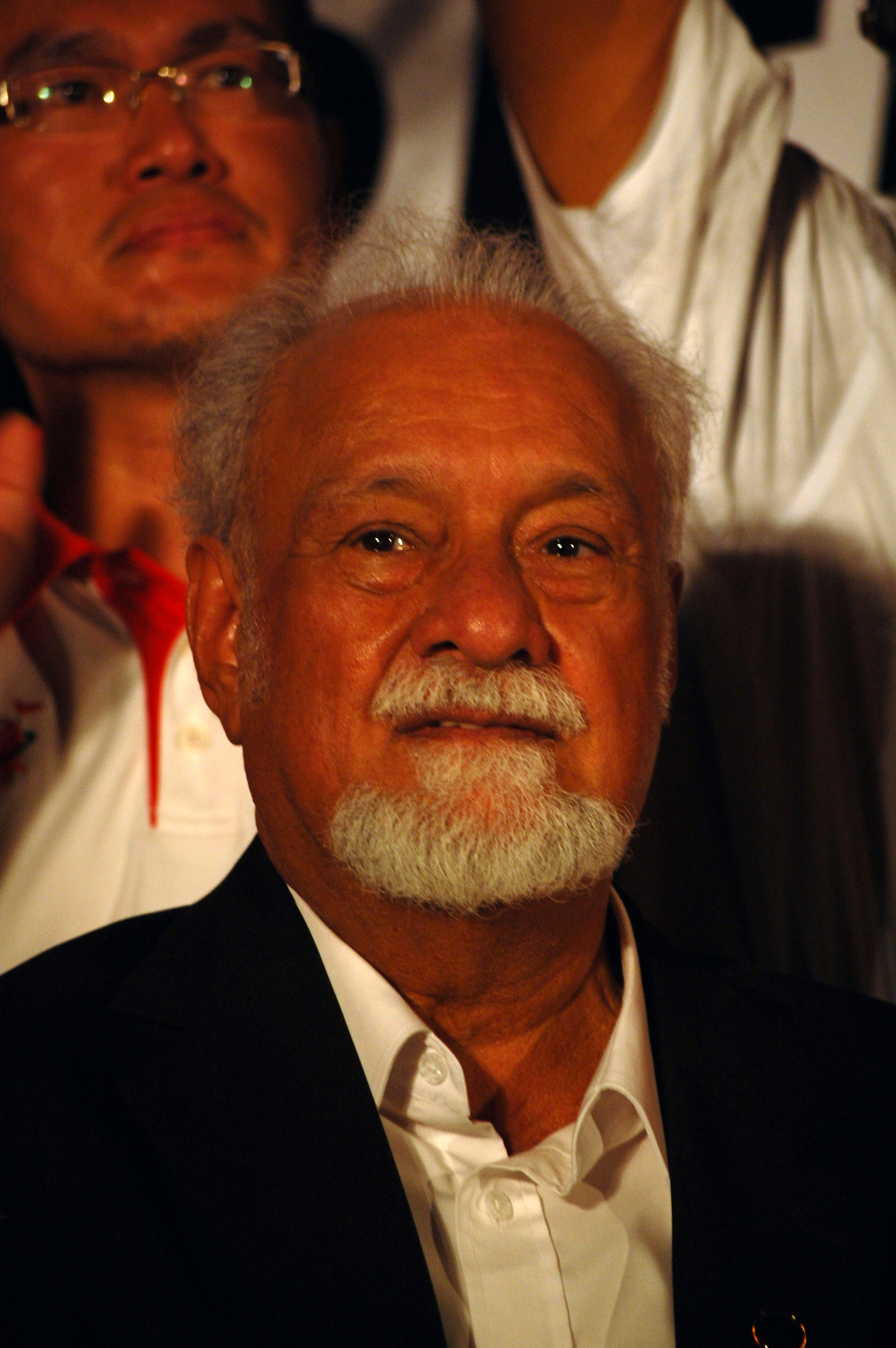
- Karpal in 2011.

3rd National Chairman of the Democratic Action Party
- In office 4 September 2004 – 29 March 2014
- Secretary-General: Lim Guan Eng
- Preceded by: Lim Kit Siang
- Succeeded by: Tan Kok Wai

Member of the Malaysian Parliament for Bukit Gelugor
- In office 21 March 2004 – 17 April 2014
- Preceded by: Position established
- Succeeded by: Ramkarpal Singh

Member of the Malaysian Parliament for Jelutong
- In office 31 July 1978 – 29 November 1999
- Preceded by: Rasiah Rajasingam
- Succeeded by: Lee Kah Choon

Personal details
- Born: Karpal Singh s/o Ram Singh Deo; 28 June 1940 George Town, Penang, Straits Settlements (now Malaysia)
- Died: 17 April 2014 (aged 73) Gua Tempurung, Perak, Malaysia
- Party: Democratic Action Party (DAP) (1970–2014)
- Other political affiliations: Gagasan Rakyat (GR) (1990–1996); Barisan Alternatif (BA) (1999–2004); Pakatan Rakyat (PR) (2008–2014)
- Spouse: Gurmit Kaur (m. 1970)
- Children: Jagdeep; Gobind; Ramkarpal; Sangeet; Mankarpal
- Parent(s): Ram Singh Deo (father); Kartar Kaur (mother)
- Education: St. Xavier's Institution
- Alma mater: National University of Singapore (LLB)
- Occupation: Politician
- Profession: Lawyer
- Nickname: Tiger of Jelutong

Karpal Singh s/o Ram Singh Deo (Punjabi: ਕਰਪਾਲ ਸਿੰਘ, romanized: Karpāl Siṅgh; 28 June 1940 – 17 April 2014) was a Malaysian politician and lawyer. He was Member of Parliament (MP) for the constituency of Bukit Gelugor in the state of Penang from 2004 to 2014. During that time, he was also the National Chairman of the Democratic Action Party (DAP).

Born in Penang to Sikh Punjabi Indian immigrant parents, Karpal studied law at the National University of Singapore. He was one of Malaysia's most prominent lawyers and took a number of high-profile cases, including drug-trafficking charges against foreign nationals. Karpal was an opponent of the death penalty, especially for drug trafficking.

In the courtroom and Parliament, he was a controversial figure. Karpal was suspended from Parliament several times, charged with sedition and detained under Malaysia's internal-security law. His reputation as a lawyer and opposition politician gave him the nickname "the Tiger of Jelutong".

Karpal's political career began in 1970 (when he joined the DAP), and he won a seat in the Kedah State Legislative Assembly in 1974. He was elected to parliament in 1978 as representative for Jelutong, Penang, and held the seat for more than 20 years until he lost it in 1999. Karpal returned to Parliament in the next general election, and led the DAP to its strongest-ever performance in the 2008 general election. A 2005 motor-vehicle accident put Karpal in a wheelchair, with neuro-motor problems in his right arm, but he continued his legal and political careers. He died on 17 April 2014 after another motor-vehicle accident.

== Early life and education ==
Born in Georgetown, Penang, Karpal was the son of a watchman and herdsman, Ram Singh Deo. His mother was Kartar Kaur.

Karpal studied at St. Xavier's Institution and received his Bachelor of Laws degree from the National University of Singapore, where he was the president of the student union. He was barred from his hostel for protesting against the university's decision to mandate certificates of political suitability for incoming students. Karpal said he took seven years to graduate, admitting that he was "playful" and "didn't attend lectures". After failing his final-year courses, the dean made him sit at the front of his classes; according to Karpal, "I couldn't play the fool anymore and I passed my exams accordingly!"

== Legal career ==
He was called to the Penang bar in 1969 and joined a firm in Alor Star, Kedah. Karpal founded his legal firm the following year, and was known for his expertise in the field of litigation. He was a pioneer in drug trafficking and habeas corpus cases, and opposed the death penalty. Karpal was praised for "defending the little man", and was called "a friend to the oppressed and marginalised." Universiti Teknologi MARA law professor Shad Saleem Faruqi praised Karpal's legal team for their innovative interpretations, which helped defendants with difficult cases.

=== Death penalty ===
Karpal was described as a leading opponent of the death penalty in Malaysia, and successfully defended at least ten foreigners on serious drug charges (which have a mandatory death sentence). However, in July 2010 he called for convicted child rapists to receive the death sentence.

Among Karpal's highest-profile cases were his defence of Australian drug trafficker Kevin Barlow, who was executed in Malaysia in 1986. Barlow and fellow Australian Brian Chambers were convicted of trafficking heroin by the High Court in Penang in July 1985, and Karpal continued fighting to clear Barlow's name after his execution. Karpal also defended New Zealanders Lorraine Cohen and her son, Aaron, against heroin-trafficking charges in 1987. They were convicted, with Lorraine sentenced to death and Aaron to life in prison. Lorraine's death sentence was commuted to life imprisonment in 1989, and both were pardoned and freed in 1996. In 1977, Karpal managed to persuade the Yang di-Pertuan Agong to pardon a 14-year-old Chinese boy who was sentenced to death for possession of a firearm under the Internal Security Act, reportedly suggesting that to let the boy hang would be "politically explosive."

In 2006, Karpal represented two sisters who were charged with allegedly masterminding the murder of their Australian stepfather Hans Herzog, who was killed by two male teenagers in a parang attack at his Kuala Lumpur home in 2003. The sisters were alleged to have hired the two boys to attack Herzog due to their resentment over the supposed abusive treatment they received from Herzog. The sisters were later acquitted without their defence being called, and Karpal would later represent one of the two hired hitmen in his appeal in 2009, which ended with the boy, who was 17 at the time of the crime, to be convicted for murder and detained indefinitely at the Selangor Sultan's pleasure. The boy's older friend Low Kian Boon (aged 18 at the time of the murder) was sentenced to death, before the sentence was reduced to 35 years' imprisonment and 12 strokes of the cane in 2024.

Karpal also took on cases outside of Malaysia's jurisdiction during his legal career. In January 1995, Karpal travelled to Singapore and represented Malaysian gunman Ng Theng Shuang in his appeal against the death sentence issued to Ng under the Arms Offences Act for discharging his firearm during a goldsmith robbery heist at Singapore's South Bridge Road. Ng's appeal was dismissed despite Karpal's arguments in the appeal, and he was hanged on 14 July 1995 in Changi Prison.

=== Anwar Ibrahim ===
Karpal represented former Deputy Prime Minister Anwar Ibrahim during Anwar's 1998 sodomy trial. In September 1999, he produced a pathological report confirming high levels of arsenic in Anwar's body and accused authorities of poisoning him: "It could well be that someone out there wants to get rid of him ... even to the extent of murder ... I suspect people in high places are responsible for this situation." The accusation led to Karpal's detention under the Sedition Act in January 2000.

He was the lead defence counsel in Anwar's second sodomy trial, after new allegations in 2008. After a two-year trial, Anwar was acquitted on 10 January 2012; however, the acquittal was overturned two years later.

== Political career ==
=== Entry into politics ===
Karpal joined the Democratic Action Party (DAP) in 1970, citing its multiracial platform after the 1969 race riots. Although he planned to contest the 1974 general election in Penang, he withdrew after his father's death. However, Karpal was persuaded by DAP national organising secretary Fan Yew Teng to stand for the Alor Setar parliamentary seat and the Alor Setar Bandar state seat. He won only the state seat, the first DAP candidate to win a seat in Kedah.

In the 1978 general elections, Karpal won the Jelutong parliamentary seat and the Bukit Gelugor state seat. He held the Bukit Gelugor state seat until 1990, losing subsequent elections for the Sungai Pinang and Padang Kota seats.

In 1989, Karpal accused Deputy Speaker D. P. Vijandran of appearing in pornographic videos. Although the allegations were dismissed due to lack of evidence, Vijandran resigned the following year. In 1992, Karpal produced the alleged videotape in parliament and gave it to Deputy Speaker Ong Tee Keat. Vijandran was convicted in May 1994 of fabricating evidence in an affidavit seeking a court order to stop his nephew from allegedly distributing pornographic videotapes in which he appeared, but the conviction was overturned in 1998. In 2000, Karpal was ordered to pay Vijandran RM500,000 (reduced to RM100,000 on appeal) in damages for defamation after he accused Vijandran of cheque fraud.

=== Setback ===
In the 1999 election, Karpal lost the Jelutong parliamentary seat he had held for 21 years, and DAP leader Lim Kit Siang was also defeated. The DAP had joined Barisan Alternatif, an opposition alliance with Parti Keadilan and the Pan-Malaysian Islamic Party (PAS) (a move strongly supported by Karpal and Lim). Despite the ruling Barisan Nasional (BN) coalition's significant losses in the election, Keadilan and PAS absorbed the gains as DAP support eroded due to suspicion of PAS and its hard-line Islamic stance. Although the DAP gained seats, the party performed well below expectations and Lim called the results a "catastrophic defeat". Despite the setback, Karpal remained as party deputy chairman and Lim became chairman after the resignation of long-serving chairman Chen Man Hin. Karpal strongly opposed a PAS plan to introduce hudud (Islamic codes of behavior) into the Terengganu state legal system in 1999, threatening to take the state government to court.

=== Return to Parliament ===
In the 2004 general election, Karpal returned to parliament with a 1,261-vote majority in the new Bukit Gelugor seat. The DAP regained its position as the largest opposition party in Parliament, and Karpal became the party's national chairman on 4 September 2004.

On 7 September, he was sanctioned for "misleading Parliament" after claiming that MPs had to raise their right hand while they took the oath of office on 17 May. A report by the Parliamentary Rights and Privileges Committee gave Karpal three days to apologise or face a six-month suspension. He refused to apologise and served the suspension.

=== Victories and controversy ===
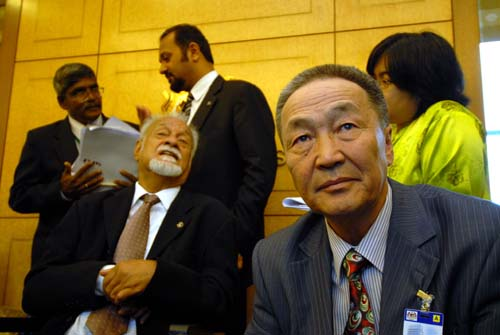
Karpal Singh (seated on the left) holding a press conference in the parliament building with Shaariibuu Setev, the father of Altantuya Shaariibuu

Karpal retained his seat in the 2008 election with a nearly-20-fold-vote increased majority (21,015 votes). The election saw historic gains for the opposition, who denied the ruling coalition Barisan Nasional (BN) a two-thirds majority in Parliament for the first time.

The three major opposition parties formed a coalition (the Pakatan Rakyat), and Karpal was listed as the DAP representative on the coalition's Shadow Ministry of Home Affairs Committee in July 2009.

In April 2010, he was suspended from parliament for ten days after he called the speaker a "dictator". In December of that year, he and opposition members of parliament Anwar Ibrahim, Azmin Ali and Sivarasa Rasiah were suspended for six months. Anwar was suspended for stirring up controversy over government links to APCO Worldwide, while the rest were punished for publicising a report by the Rights and Privileges Committee finding Anwar guilty before the report was presented to Parliament.

In December 2011, Karpal and Penang second deputy chief minister P. Ramasamy feuded over Ramasamy's reported accusation that dissidents in the DAP were plotting against him for not giving them projects and favours. Karpal called Ramasamy a "warlord" and asked for him to resign as deputy chief minister. Ramasamy asked the party to remove its "godfathers", an apparent reference to Karpal. The feud was resolved internally, and Ramasamy later denied ever making the accusation. At the DAP national conference in January 2012, Karpal joined Ramasamy and asked the party's "warlords and godfathers [to] stand together against Barisan Nasional."

== Political views ==
Karpal Singh cited David Saul Marshall, Mahatma Gandhi and John F. Kennedy as influences. The 13 May Incident convinced him that Malaysia needed to take a multiracial course, and he joined the DAP in 1970. Karpal praised the country's first prime minister, Tunku Abdul Rahman for promoting racial unity. He criticised the legal immunity granted to the hereditary Malay rulers in the original constitution, which was removed by the Mahathir Mohamad government in 1993.

Karpal Singh opposed the idea of Malaysia as an Islamic state, arguing that the constitution provided for a secular nation with Islam as the official religion, and clashed with Mahathir and fellow opposition party PAS over the issue. Karpal said "an Islamic state over my dead body" about the debate during a political speech, but later said that he had apologised for the remark.

== Controversies and issues ==
Karpal was a controversial figure, and he and fellow DAP politician Lim Kit Siang have been referred to as racial provocateurs. He was nicknamed "the Tiger of Jelutong" by admirers after serving five terms as Jelutong MP. Karpal attributed the nickname to a confrontation with former Malaysian Indian Congress President Samy Vellu when he said to Samy, "he could be the lion, and I could be the tiger, because there are no lions in Malaysia!"

=== Slurs ===
He clashed with government parliamentarians and assemblymen during debates. On two occasions in the Penang State Assembly, the speaker called police to have Karpal removed from the chamber. Karpal ordered the police officers out both times, saying that they had no right to be there before walking out on his own.

He criticised the Yang di-Pertuan Agong in the Dewan Rakyat for allegedly assaulting two men who were brought to the palace by police, which sparked demands for an apology from members of Parliament; Karpal refused. Karpal filed a lawsuit against the king, Iskandar of Johor, in 1986 on behalf of one of the men. He lost, and the sultan reportedly named one of his dogs after him.

Karpal served two six-month suspensions from Parliament: in September 2004 for "misleading" Parliament, and in December 2010 for contempt. During a May 2008 session, he called fellow parliamentarian Bung Moktar Radin the "Bigfoot from Kinabatangan". Moments later, Karpal was mocked by Ibrahim Ali and Bung Moktar Radin for his inability to stand while speaking as a result of his disability (provoking a furore among opposition members). The following month, he received a death threat in the form of a bullet delivered to his law firm. In October, Karpal was suspended from Parliament for two days for calling speaker Pandikar Amin Mulia "not serious" and "playful".

=== Detentions ===
He and a number of other opposition politicians were detained without trial under the Internal Security Act during Operation Lalang in October 1987 for inciting "racial tension" in Malaysia. Karpal was released for several hours in March 1988 in response to a habeas corpus application before being rearrested and imprisoned until January 1989. Amnesty International called him a prisoner of conscience.

=== Sedition trials ===
Karpal, four other opposition politicians and the editor of the Harakah Daily (the newspaper published by the opposition Pan-Malaysian Islamic Party) were arrested in January 2000 under the Sedition Act, and he was charged with making seditious remarks in court during Anwar's first corruption trial. This, the only known charge of sedition in any Commonwealth country brought against a lawyer for remarks made in court in defence of a client, was dropped in 2002.

He was again charged under the Sedition Act in March 2009 with threatening to sue the Sultan of Perak, Sultan Azlan Shah, in the wake of the 2009 Perak constitutional crisis. Karpal had contended that the sultan had exceeded his constitutional powers in appointing Zambry Abdul Kadir Menteri Besar. The charges were dismissed in June 2010 after the High Court determined that the prosecution had failed to prove a prima facie case. However, the Court of Appeal reversed the acquittal in January 2012 and ordered Karpal to enter a defence. In March 2019, 10 years after the incident the Federal Court acquitted Karpal posthumously.

== Personal life ==
=== Family ===
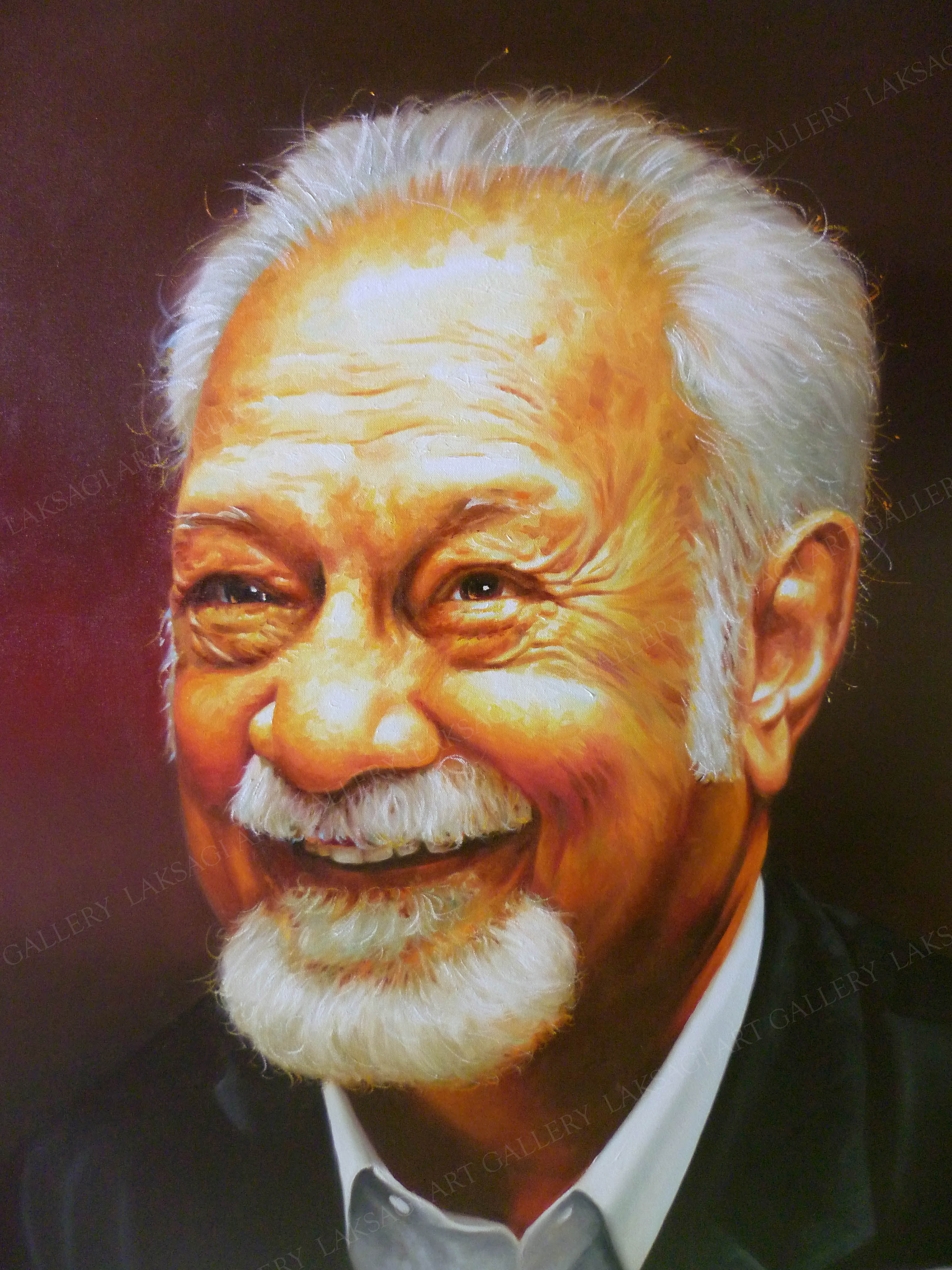
Oil portrait of Karpal

Karpal married Gurmit Kaur, eight years his junior, in July 1970. Gurmit's family, from Narathiwat, Thailand, moved to Penang when she was seven. They had five children and eleven grandchildren. Karpal's eldest son, Jagdeep, is the Penang State Assemblyman for Datok Keramat; his second son, Gobind, was the Minister of Communications and Multimedia and is the Member of Parliament for Puchong, Selangor. His third son, Ramkarpal succeeded him as the MP for Bukit Gelugor after his death. His daughter, Sangeet Kaur works in his law firm and his youngest son, Man Karpal studied actuarial science.

Gurmit described Karpal's detention from 1987 to 1989 as a "very big experience", which took a toll on her life because she had to "be strong" for their young children. The initial stage of his disability also deeply upset her. Karpal and Gurmit lived in Damansara Heights, Kuala Lumpur, from 1994 until his death.

=== Accident and disability ===
On 28 January 2005, Karpal was involved in an accident which left him in a wheelchair. A car struck a taxi in which he was seated from behind, severely bruising his thoracic vertebrae. The accident left Karpal with sensory impairment and reduced motor strength, and he was unable to walk or raise his right arm more than a few centimeters. His seat in the parliamentary chamber was moved to the back row to accommodate his wheelchair.

== Death and funeral ==
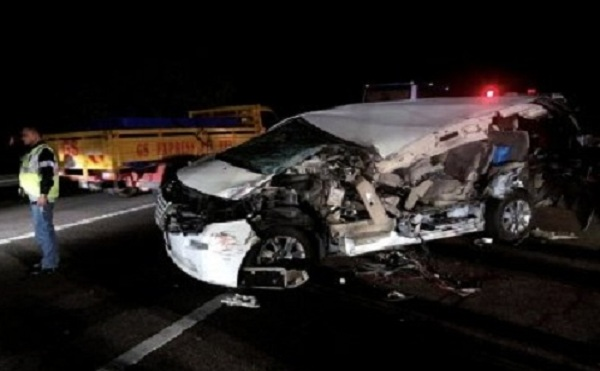
Karpal's minivan after the accident

In the early hours of 17 April 2014, Karpal died in a car crash on the North–South Expressway E1 near Gua Tempurung, Perak. His personal assistant, Michael Cornelius, was also killed in the accident. Ramkarpal (Karpal's son and one of the minivan's five occupants) and an Indonesian maid believed to have been employed by Karpal were injured. The driver of the minivan was injured as well. Karpal's Toyota Alphard collided with the right side of a slow-moving, five-tonne Mitsubishi Canter lorry carrying cement, steel, and tiles. Although the lorry driver (identified as Abu Mansor Mohd) tested positive for cannabis, it was uncertain if he was under influence at the time of the accident. According to Bukit Aman traffic-police chief SAC Mohd Fuad Abdul Latiff, road conditions and the weather were good at the time of the accident.

Karpal's funeral was held on 20 April 2014 with full state honors in Penang, attended by his family, Prime Minister Najib Razak and other mourners. His body reached the Batu Gantong Crematorium, George Town, Penang at 1:35 pm and was cremated after thousands of mourners chanted his name. His son, Gobind, memorialised him on 5 May during the last of a series of tributes.

== Memorials, awards and accolades ==
On 19 April 2014, two days after his death, the IJM Promenade in Lebuh Sungai Pinang was renamed Karpal Singh Drive (Persiaran Karpal Singh). The Full Biography: Karpal Singh, Tiger of Jelutong by Tim Donoghue, published in 2014 by Marshal Cavendish International, is an updated edition of Donoghue's Karpal Singh: Tiger of Jelutong which published prior to his death. Karpal received the Glory of India Award of Excellence in 2011, and was one of the top 10 NRI Newsmakers of 2008.

== Election results ==
Parliament of Malaysia
Year	Constituency	Candidate	Votes	Pct	Opponent(s)	Votes	Pct	Ballots cast	Majority	Turnout
1974	P007 Alor Setar	Karpal Singh Ram Singh (DAP)	9,450	41.32%	Oo Gin Sun (MCA)	13,420	58.68%	23,939	3,970	61.24%
1978	P043 Jelutong	Karpal Singh Ram Singh (DAP)	23,606	51.33%	Lee Him (Gerakan)	19,985	43.45%	47,308	3,621	
1978	P043 Jelutong	Karpal Singh Ram Singh (DAP)	23,606	51.33%	Yeap Ghim Guan (SDP)	2,401	5.22%	47,308	3,621	
1982	P043 Jelutong	Karpal Singh Ram Singh (DAP)	29,099	55.21%	Ooi Ean Kwong (Gerakan)	23,603	44.79%	53,870	5,496	75.77%
1986	P046 Jelutong	Karpal Singh Ram Singh (DAP)	25,932	62.09%	Lim Boo Chang (Gerakan)	15,833	37.91%	42,723	10,099	71.34%
1990	P046 Jelutong	Karpal Singh Ram Singh (DAP)	27,426	60.05%	Ooi Ean Kwong (Gerakan)	18,248	39.95%	46,515	9,178	74.87%
1995	P049 Jelutong	Karpal Singh Ram Singh (DAP)	21,896	49.84%	Rhina Bhar @ Rani Raj Pal (Gerakan)	21,613	49.19%	44,922	283	75.05%
1995	P049 Jelutong	Karpal Singh Ram Singh (DAP)	21,896	49.84%	Lim Cheak Kow (PBS)	425	0.97%	44,922	283	75.05%
1999	P049 Jelutong	Karpal Singh Ram Singh (DAP)	20,716	49.08%	Lee Kah Choon (Gerakan)	21,491	50.92%	43,239	775	72.82%
2004	P051 Bukit Gelugor	Karpal Singh Ram Singh (DAP)	22,529	51.44%	Lim Boo Chang (MCA)	21,268	48.56%	44,618	1,261	74.21%
2008	P051 Bukit Gelugor	Karpal Singh Ram Singh (DAP)	35,140	71.33%	Koay Kar Huah (MCA)	14,125	28.67%	50,553	21,015	77.05%
2013	P051 Bukit Gelugor	Karpal Singh Ram Singh (DAP)	56,303	80.55%	Teh Beng Yeam (MCA)	13,597	19.45%	70,683	42,706	86.31%

Kedah State Legislative Assembly
Year	Constituency	Candidate	Votes	Pct	Opponent(s)	Votes	Pct	Ballots cast	Majority	Turnout
1974	N10 Bandar Alor Setar	Karpal Singh Ram Singh (DAP)	7,680	55.70%	Geh Teng Keng (Gerakan)	6,108	44.30%	14,487	1,572	65.15%

Penang State Legislative Assembly
Year	Constituency	Candidate	Votes	Pct	Opponent(s)	Votes	Pct	Ballots cast	Majority	Turnout
1978	N27 Bukit Gelugor	Karpal Singh Ram Singh (DAP)								
1982	N27 Bukit Gelugor	Karpal Singh Ram Singh (DAP)	10,059	50.79%	Lim Kah Pin	9,179	46.35%		880	
1982	N27 Bukit Gelugor	Karpal Singh Ram Singh (DAP)	10,059	50.79%	Ong Kean Thong (SDP)	426	2.15%		880	
1982	N27 Bukit Gelugor	Karpal Singh Ram Singh (DAP)	10,059	50.79%	Tan Teik Lim (IND)	141	0.71%		880	
1986	N28 Bukit Gelugor	Karpal Singh Ram Singh (DAP)	6,801	60.28%	Ho Sen Feek	4,273	37.87%	11,449	2,528	69.02%
1986	N28 Bukit Gelugor	Karpal Singh Ram Singh (DAP)	6,801	60.28%	Lim Kah Pin (SDP)	209	1.85%	11,449	2,528	69.02%
1991	N09 Prai	Karpal Singh Ram Singh (DAP)			V. Muthusamy (MIC)					
1991	N09 Prai	Karpal Singh Ram Singh (DAP)			T. Muniandy (IND)					
1995	N22 Padang Kota	Karpal Singh Ram Singh (DAP)	5,737	42.12%	Teng Chang Yeow (Gerakan)	7,939	58.29%		2,560	72.38%
1999	N25 Datok Keramat	Karpal Singh Ram Singh (DAP)	5,451	37.78%	Lim Boo Chang (Gerakan)	8,599	59.60%	14,427	3,148	72.04%

== Honours ==
=== Honours of Malaysia ===
- Penang
  - Knight Grand Commander of the Order of the Defender of State (DUPN) – Dato' Seri Utama (2020; posthumously)

== See also ==
- List of Malaysian politicians of Indian descent

Parliament of Malaysia
Preceded by Rasiah Rajasingam	Member of Parliament for Jelutong; 1978–1999	Succeeded by Lee Kah Choon
Preceded by Constituency created	Member of Parliament for Bukit Gelugor; 2004–2014	Succeeded by Ramkarpal Singh
Party political offices
Preceded by Lim Kit Siang	National Chairman of the Democratic Action Party; 2004–2014	Succeeded by Tan Kok Wai
