= Health in Malaysia =

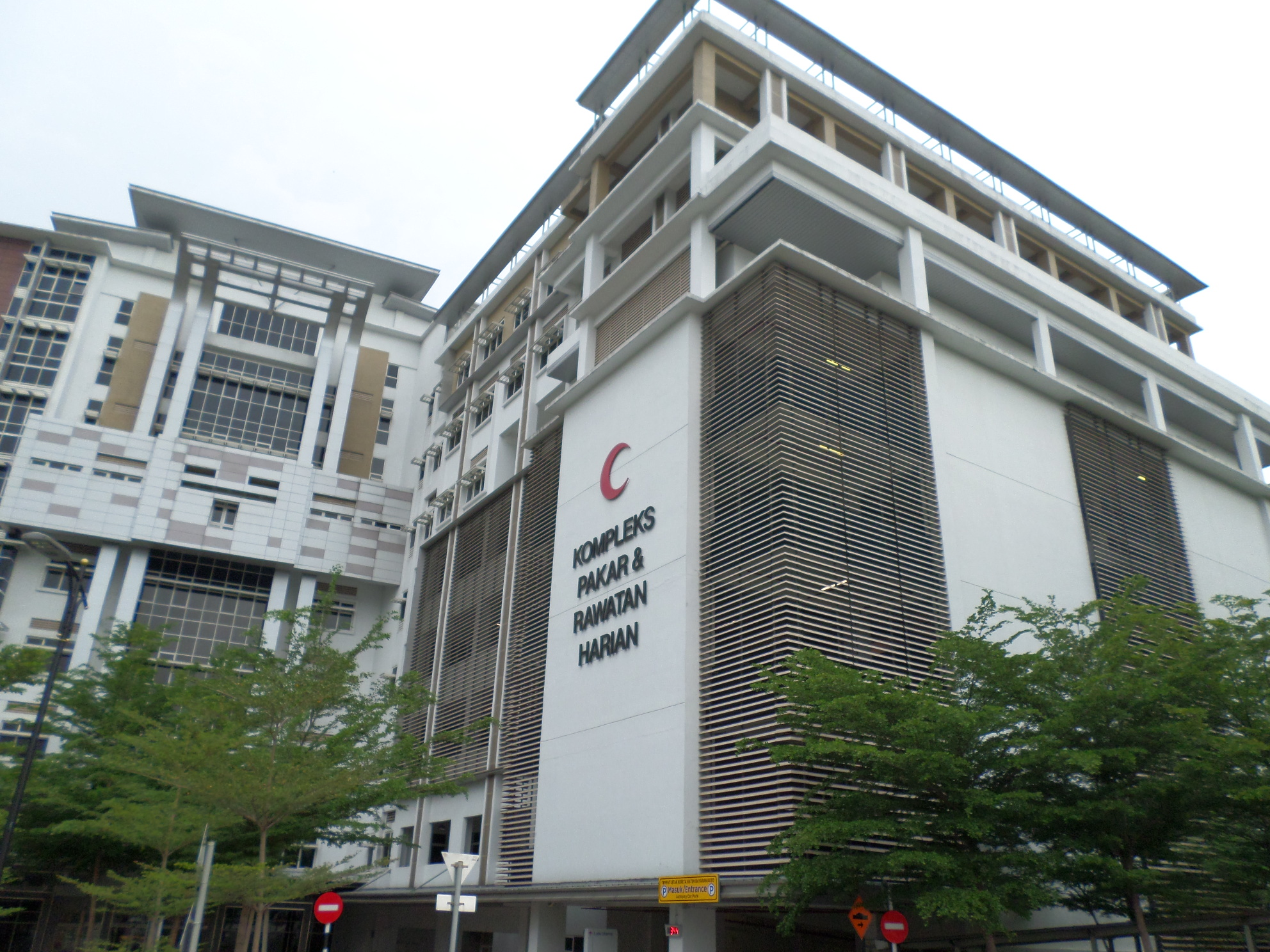
Kuala Lumpur Hospital

Malaysia is classified by The World Bank as upper middle-income country and is attempting to achieve high-income status between 2028 and 2030 and to move further up the value-added production chain by attracting investments in high technology, knowledge-based industries and services. Malaysia's HDI value for 2015 was recorded at 0.789 and HDI rank no 59 out of 188 countries and territories on the United Nations Development Programme's Human Development Index. In 2016, the population of Malaysia is 31 million; Total expenditure on health per capita (Intl $, 2014) is 1040; Total expenditure on health as % of GDP (2014) was 4.2. Gross national income (GNI) per capita (2011 PPP$) was recorded at 24,620.

Malaysia's Human Development Index and Component indicators for 2015 relative to selected countries and groups
| | HDI value | HDI rank | life expectancy at birth | Expected years of Schooling | Mean years of Schooling |
|---|---|---|---|---|---|
| Malaysia | 0.789 | 59 | 74.9 | 13.1 | 10.1 |
| Singapore | 0.925 | 5 | 83.2 | 15.4 | 11.6 |
| Thailand | 0.740 | 87 | 74.6 | 13.6 | 7.9 |

The Human Rights Measurement Initiative finds that Malaysia is fulfilling 74.9% of what it should be fulfilling for the right to health based on its level of income. When looking at the right to health with respect to children, Malaysia achieves 96.8% of what is expected based on its current income. In regards to the right to health amongst the adult population, the country achieves only 86.4% of what is expected based on the nation's level of income. Malaysia falls into the "very bad" category when evaluating the right to reproductive health because the nation is fulfilling only 41.6% of what the nation is expected to achieve based on the resources (income) it has available.

== Trends in the Human Development Index, 1990-2015 ==
Malaysia is classified as High Human Development (HDI) country with HDI of 0.789 in the year of 2015 while average annual income growth in the year 2015 is 0.85%.

== Mortality rates ==
In 2016, neonatal mortality rate for Malaysia was recorded at 4.4 deaths per 1,000 live births. Between 1967 and 2016, neonatal mortality rate of Malaysia has shown a decline at a moderating rate to shrink from 16.6 deaths per 1,000 live births in 1967 to 4.1 deaths per 1,000 live births in 2016. Infant mortality rate for Malaysia in 2016 was 7.1 deaths per 1,000 live births. Infant mortality rate fell gradually from 46.8 deaths per 1,000 live births in 1967 to 7.1 deaths per 1,000 live births in 2016. Under-5 mortality rate for Malaysia in the year 2015 was 7.45 deaths per thousand live births. It is shown that Under-5 mortality rate of Malaysia showed decreased from 70.31 deaths per thousand live births in 1966 to 7.45 deaths per thousand live births in 2015. Maternal mortality ratio for Malaysia at 2015 was 40 deaths per 100,000 live births. Maternal mortality ratio of Malaysia recorded a gradual decrease from 65 deaths per 100,000 live births in 1996 to 40 deaths per 100,000 live births in 2015.

== Life expectancy at birth ==
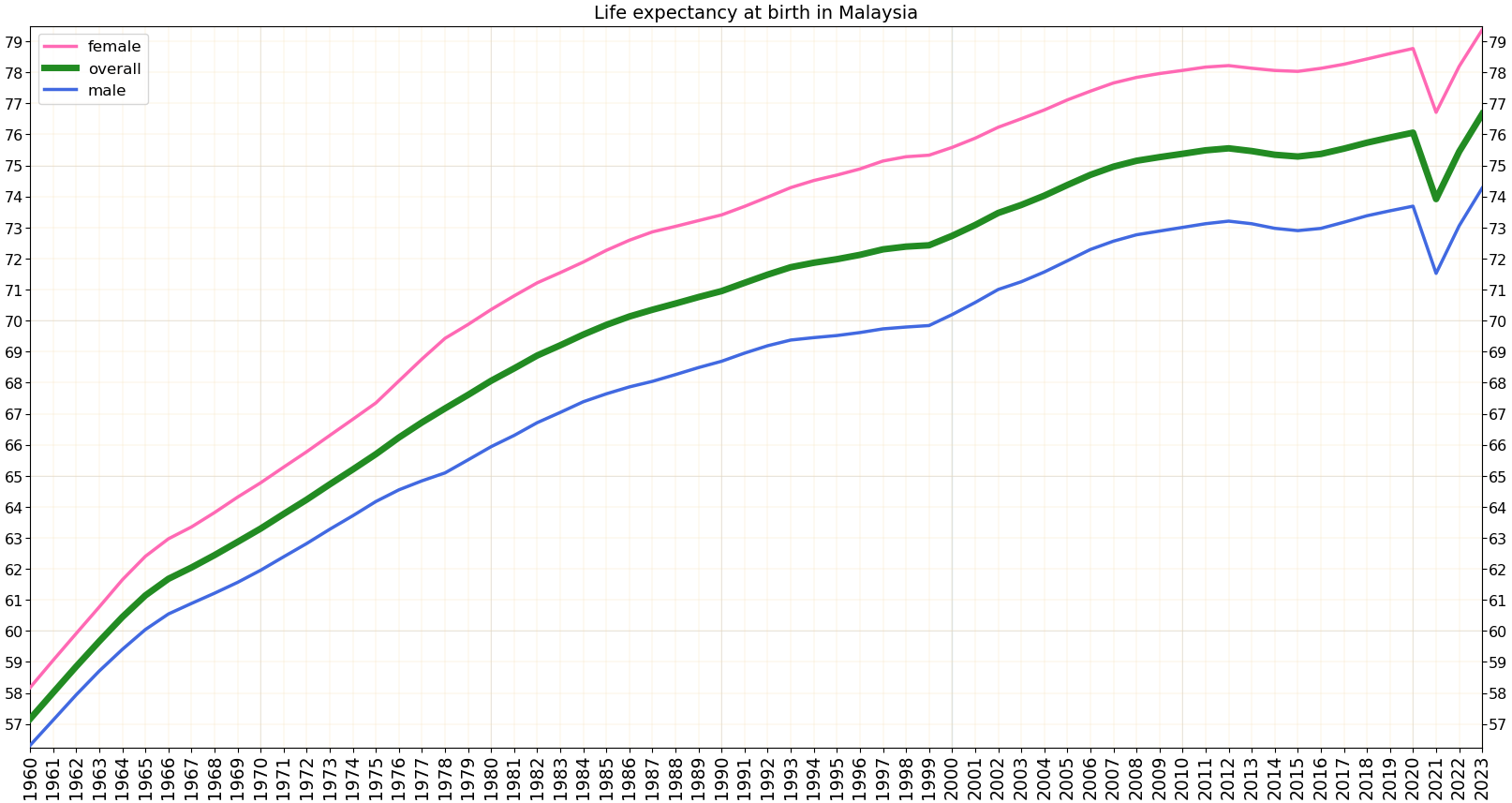
Life expectancy in Malaysia

In the year 2016, global average of life expectancy at birth for both sexes was 72.0 years. Life expectancy at birth for Malaysia in the year 2016 for both sexes was 75.3 years. Japan has the highest life expectancy at birth for both sexes in the year 2016 which is 84.2.

== Death rate ==
Death rate for Malaysia in 2016 was 4.9 per 1,000 people. Death rate of Malaysia has decreased from 8 per 1,000 people in 1967 to 4.9 per 1,000 people in 2016. A total of 162,201 deaths were recorded in the year 2016 and there is an increase of 4.1% as compared to 2015 with 155,786. (51.8%). The number of medically certified deaths in 2016 were recorded at 85,637 (52.8%) which is an increase of 1.0 percentage points as compared to 80,691 in 2015 (51.8%).

Department of statistic Malaysia reported in the press release statistics on causes of death, Malaysia 2017 that the principal causes of death in the year 2016 was ischaemic disease (13.2 per cent), followed by pneumonia (12.5%), cerebrovascular diseases (6.9%), transport accidents (5.4%) and malignant neoplasm of trachea, bronchus & lung (2.2%). In 2016, the Ischemic heart disease was the principal cause of death for males. Deaths due to ischaemic heart diseases recorded the highest percentage for males (15.3%), followed by pneumonia of 11.5%, 7.5% for transport accidents, cerebrovascular diseases accounts for 6.4% and 2.4% malignant neoplasm of trachea, bronchus & lung. For women, the principal cause of death was pneumonia. Deaths due to pneumonia (14%) recorded the highest percentage for females in 2016, ischaemic heart diseases followed next at 9.9%, cerebrovascular diseases account for 7.6%, 3.8% for malignant neoplasm of breast and 2.2% for transport accident.

== Child health ==
The under 5 mortality rate was 8.3 per 1000 live birth in the year of 2016. The major cause of under 5 death in 2016 is due to certain conditions originating in the perinatal period and it is recorded at 35.0%, followed by 27.2% for congenital malformations, deformations & chromosomal abnormalities, pneumonia (3.8%), transport accidents (1.8%) and 1.1% accidental drowning & submersion. As much as 77.0% of infant deaths were due to five principal causes of death which include certain conditions originating in the perinatal period (41.9%); 30.5% congenital malformations, deformations & chromosomal abnormalities; 3.0% of pneumonia; chronic lower respiratory disease (0.9%); and meningitis (0.7%).

== Maternal health ==
The main causes of maternal deaths was due to obstetric embolism, it is recorded at 23.0%, followed by complicating pregnancy, childbirth & the puerperium (18.2%), postpartum haemorrhage (11.5%), ectopic pregnancy (6.8%) and eclampsia (6.1%). However, the percentage of deaths due to obstetric embolism in 2016 recorded a decline from 27.4 to 23.0 per cent as compared to 2015.

== Epidemiology ==
Leptospirosis is a water contract disease caused by bacteria of the genus Leptospirabacterial. It is a disease that affects both humans and animals. The number of leptospirosis cases had steadily increased from 2011 (2,268 cases with 55 death) to 2015 (8,291 cases with 78 death) and 5,284 cases with 52 death in 2016. Leptospirosis can have important health impact and is a burden to the nation if not well controlled. Addressing leptospirosis includes maintain a clean environment and by not swimming or wading in water that might be contaminated with animal urine, or eliminating contact with potentially infected animals.

Prevalence of HIV as a share of population aged 15–49 in 2016, was 0.4% and has fallen gradually from 0.7% in 1997 to 0.4% in 2016. Incidence of tuberculosis fluctuated substantially in recent years through 2002 - 2016 and in the year 2016, incidence of tuberculosis for Malaysia was 92 cases per 100,000 people.

=== Non communicable disease ===
The largest contribution to mortality is non communicable disease. 40 million people each year die from noncommunicable diseases (NCDs) and accounted for 70% of global deaths annually. From 1996 to 2011 the proportion of the population who are obese increased from 5% to 15%. In 2018 it was said to be one of the fattest countries in the world. In 2015, the National Health Morbidity Survey revealed that the overall prevalence of two out of three major risk factors contributing to non-communicable disease remained high for diabetes In 2017 the prevalence of hypertension was 30.3%, which is lower than the prevalence in 2011 and 2006 with 32.7% and 32.2% respectively. The prevalence of hypercholesterolemia increased to 47.7% in 2017 from 32.6% in 2011 Risk factors for noncommunicable diseases include tobacco use, reduced physical activity, excessive alcohol use and unhealthy food consumption. Managing the risk factor as well as early detection of disease is the key to combat non communicable diseases besides than policy coherence across all levels of government at the national and international level. Until 2014 the price of sugar was subsidised, but a tax on sweetened beverages is to be introduced from April 2019. Levels of physical movement are said to have crashed in children.

== Vaccination ==
In Malaysia, mass vaccination is practised in public schools. The vaccines may be administered by a school nurse or a team of other medical staff from outside the school. All the children in a given school year are vaccinated as a cohort. For example, children may receive the oral polio vaccine in Year One of primary school (about six or seven years of age), the BCG in Year Six, and the MMR in Form Three of secondary school. Therefore, most people have received their core vaccines by the time they finish secondary school.

== See also ==
- Healthcare in Malaysia
