= Ramkarpal Singh =

Malaysian politician and lawyer

Yang Berhormat Tuan Ramkarpal Singh MP
- ਰਾਮਕਰਪਾਲ ਸਿੰਘ

Deputy Minister in the Prime Minister's Department (Law and Institutional Reforms)
- In office 10 December 2022 – 12 December 2023
- Monarch: Abdullah
- Prime Minister: Anwar Ibrahim
- Minister: Azalina Othman Said
- Preceded by: Mas Ermieyati Samsudin (Deputy Minister in the Prime Minister's Department (Parliament and Law))
- Succeeded by: M. Kulasegaran
- Constituency: Bukit Gelugor

Deputy Secretary-General of the Democratic Action Party
- Incumbent
- Assumed office 16 March 2025 Serving with Steven Sim Chee Keong & Hannah Yeoh Tseow Suan
- Secretary-General: Anthony Loke Siew Fook
- Preceded by: Tengku Zulpuri Shah Raja Puji

State Deputy Chairman of the Democratic Action Party of Penang
- Incumbent
- Assumed office 22 September 2024
- Secretary-General: Anthony Loke Siew Fook
- State Chairman: Steven Sim Chee Keong
- Preceded by: Jagdeep Singh Deo

Member of the Malaysian Parliament for Bukit Gelugor
- Incumbent
- Assumed office 25 May 2014
- Preceded by: Karpal Singh (PR–DAP)
- Majority: 37,659 (2014); 55,951 (2018); 63,112 (2022)

Other roles
- 2019–2020: Chairman of the Consideration of Bills Select Committee

Personal details
- Born: Ramkarpal Singh s/o Karpal Singh; 9 April 1976 (age 50) Penang, Malaysia
- Citizenship: Malaysian
- Party: Democratic Action Party (DAP)
- Other political affiliations: Pakatan Rakyat (PR) (2008–2015); Pakatan Harapan (PH) (since 2015)
- Relations: Jagdeep Singh Deo (older brother); Gobind Singh Deo (older brother)
- Parent(s): Karpal Singh (father); Gurmit Kaur (mother)
- Education: University of Bristol
- Occupation: Politician
- Profession: Lawyer

Ramkarpal Singh s/o Karpal Singh (Punjabi: ਰਾਮਕਰਪਾਲ ਸਿੰਘ, romanized: Rāmkarpāl Siṅgh; born 9 April 1976) commonly referred to as Ramkarpal Singh, is a Malaysian politician and lawyer who has served as the Member of Parliament (MP) for Bukit Gelugor since May 2014. He served as the Deputy Minister in the Prime Minister's Department in charge of Law and Institutional Reforms in the Unity Government administration under Prime Minister Anwar Ibrahim and Minister Azalina Othman Said from December 2022 to his resignation in December 2023 and Chairman of the Consideration of Bills Select Committee from July 2019 to 2020. He is a member of Democratic Action Party (DAP), a component party of the PH coalition. He has also served as the Deputy Secretary-General of DAP since March 2025 and State Deputy Chairman of DAP of Penang since September 2024. He is the son of Karpal Singh and younger brother of Gobind Singh Deo, the Minister of Digital and the MP for Damansara as well as Jagdeep Singh Deo, the Deputy Chief Minister of Penang II and Member of the Penang State Legislative Assembly (MLA) for Datok Keramat.

== Education ==
Ramkarpal was educated in Penang, first at St. Xavier's Institution and then Seri Inai School (now Tenby International School). He earned his Bachelor of Laws from the University of Bristol in the UK and was called to the bar by Gray's Inn.

== Politics ==
After the death of his father Karpal, Ramkarpal was elected as the MP for Bukit Gelugor constituency. He was the only Pakatan Rakyat's candidate for the 2014 Bukit Gelugor by-election. He won the Bukit Gelugor by-election with 37,659 votes majority. He was sworn as MP on 10 July 2014. He retained his Bukit Gelugor seat by an even larger 55,951-vote majority in the 2018 General Elections, when his coalition, Pakatan Harapan (PH), defeated the incumbent Barisan Nasional (BN) to form the government.

On 18 July 2019, Ramkarpal was selected as chair of the Consideration of Bills Select Committee, replacing Permatang Pauh MP Nurul Izzah Anwar.

== Legal career ==
He was admitted to the Malaysian bar in 2000. Currently, he heads his late father's law firm in Green Hall, Penang.

Ramkarpal is also the legal representative for the family of Mongolian woman Altantuya Shaariibuu. In June 2018, he assisted Altantuya's father, Shaariibuu, in meeting with Prime Minister Mahathir Mohamad.

== Death of Karpal Singh ==
Ramkarpal was travelling with his father from his Pudu office to Penang when the accident happened. According to Ramkarpal, his father was asleep before the fatal crash took place, claiming the life of Karpal and his personal aide, Michael Cornelius Selvam.

== Election results ==
Parliament of Malaysia
Year	Constituency	Candidate	Votes	Pct	Opponent(s)	Votes	Pct	Ballots cast	Majority	Turnout
2014	P051 Bukit Gelugor	Ramkarpal Singh Karpal Singh (DAP)	41,242	89.95%	Huan Cheng Guan (PCM)	3,583	7.81%	46,438	37,659	56.34%
2014	P051 Bukit Gelugor	Ramkarpal Singh Karpal Singh (DAP)	41,242	89.95%	Mohd Nabi Bux Mohd Nabi Abdul Sathar (IND)	799	1.74%	46,438	37,659	56.34%
2014	P051 Bukit Gelugor	Ramkarpal Singh Karpal Singh (DAP)	41,242	89.95%	Abu Backer Sidek Mohammad Zan (IND)	225	0.49%	46,438	37,659	56.34%
2018	P051 Bukit Gelugor	Ramkarpal Singh Karpal Singh (DAP)	65,622	86.68%	Low Joo Hiap (MCA)	9,671	12.77%	76,489	55,951	83.51%
2018	P051 Bukit Gelugor	Ramkarpal Singh Karpal Singh (DAP)	65,622	86.68%	Lai Xue Ching (MUP)	412	0.54%	76,489	55,951	83.51%
2022	P051 Bukit Gelugor	Ramkarpal Singh Karpal Singh (DAP)	71,204	82.73%	Thinagaranabhan Padmanabhan (BERSATU)	8,092	9.40%	86,996	63,112	76.90%
2022	P051 Bukit Gelugor	Ramkarpal Singh Karpal Singh (DAP)	71,204	82.73%	Wong Chin Chang (MCA)	6,777	7.87%	86,996	63,112	76.90%

== Honours ==
=== Honours of Malaysia ===
- Malaysia
  - Recipient of the 17th Yang di-Pertuan Agong Installation Medal (2024)

== See also ==
- 2014 Bukit Gelugor by-election
- Bukit Gelugor (federal constituency)
- List of Malaysian politicians of Indian origin
