= Effects of marriage =

In family law, effects of marriage is a legal term of art used to describe all of the rights and obligations that individuals may be subject and entitled to if they are in a common-law marriage, an annulled marriage, domestic partnership or a civil union.

Thus, even if the underlying marriage is held to be void there may still be rights and obligations that continue and are recognized by court order. An example may be an annulled marriage where the court awards alimony to the weaker, poorer or less well educated spouse to allow them a period of time to go back to school or re-enter the work force.

There are a few positive and negative influences of marriage on an individual. Life after marriage depends on individual and partner. First of all, an individual becomes excited that they will begin to share their life with someone who cares for them, and whom they feel comforted by. They will feel excited to know that soon they will be starting a family of their own, and that they will become parents of their own children. Research has shown that those individuals who live a stable marital relationship tend to live longer, have a better physical health, better functional health at old age and better emotional health than those in troubled marriages or who are divorced.

On the other hand, there a few negative influences of marriage on an adult. An adult can become stressed out on the fact that they will need to make compromises and sacrifices, in order to form a good marital relationship. This can lead to a loss of hobbies, because there are restrictions about what the individuals can do; and these restrictions are for both the men and women in the relationship. The adult may develop a sense of stress because they have a lot of responsibility ahead of them. In addition, the individuals in the relationship can become upset by the fact that they have to make sure that their relationship has no betrayals, and it is kept loyal, throughout the couple's lives.

== Traditional marriage ==
Traditional marriage defined as being between a man and a woman as defined by the American Psychological Association by defining it as "a marriage of husband and wife, wherein the former is the primary or sole breadwinner and the latter holds primary or sole responsibility for maintaining the home and managing child care." This union, when intentionally invested in, can have health benefits for the individuals involved. Furthermore, the American Sociological Association noted on their findings that is it not necessarily being in a marriage that brings the benefits, rather it is being in a "good marriage" quality that brings benefits of better health and well-being. Individuals can be in marriage and have their health plummet because the relationship is abusive. Thus, it is evident that the quality of the marriage is a determining factor if people receive health benefits.

Studies have shown that single individuals are at a disadvantage relative to married individuals in terms of recovering from or adapting to illness with even less difference in health behavior, morbidity, and self-reported health. Married individuals are typically healthier than unmarried individuals. Furthermore in regards to mental health, Gove et al., found in their studies that marital status appears to be approximately as powerful a factor of determining mental health as education, income and even more so in regard to age, race or childhood background. Ironically, as more research are conducted, it is gradually shown that the belief that trying to have more free time and less busy work does not make people happy. Often times, people believe that in order to be happy, they need to have less social constraints and obligations. However, research has shown that the very social constraints and obligations that many believe steal our happiness from us are the very things that are necessary by-products of living with others that have a strong effect on our mental well-being that tends to override the positive effect of companionship and social support among those who never married, are divorced or are separated or widowed.

It is also worth mentioning that data shows that cohabitation may appear to have much of the same advantages to health that marriage does; which may lead individuals to assume that cohabitation is a good alternative to marriage. However, as a caution it is good to remember that cohabitation also is a less stable family structure both for couples with or without children. Furthermore, it has been found that those in cohabitating relationships are more likely to end their unions, have lower life satisfaction, have low relationship quality and more likely to be depressed. Thus, we see that more benefits lie in traditional marriage than cohabitation.

The benefits of marriage go beyond health and living with a partner, because marriage is a public vow and a legal contract, it signifies a stronger and more sacred commitment between the partner to the public and more importantly, to each other. Individuals who share a union in marriage may have better long-term perspectives that the single or cohabitating counterparts because marriage is intended to last through life. Marriage also makes couples stronger because due to the fact that when the going gets tough, couples are motivated to work harder on their relationship, which forges a stronger and more powerful bond in the marriage. The union of marriage between husband and wife brings a sense of security and wellbeing in emotional reassurance, financial stability, security for their children and the comfort of not being alone in old age say focus group respondents throughout Europe and Australia. Lastly, this security is only strengthened by the protection marriage provides in certain countries within the legal system; thus we see that marriage reduces insecurities in life and increase general well-being which overall greatly affects health.

Healthier people in marriages may have a better chance of having a successful marriage. A healthier person may be more appealing to their partner. For example, having a higher income could improve the health care individuals receive or lowers stress. In certain marriages, a spouse may help in monitoring and encouraging healthy behaviors; as well as discouraging unhealthy habits. Marriage may provide an emotional fulfilling relationship. Which would satisfy the need for a social connection. Marriage is able to reduce depressive symptoms for both men and women. As marriage is able to reduce them, divorce is able to increase them. Marriage can also be associated with less healthier behaviors. For example, alcohol consumption, drug use, cigarette smoking, diet, and exercise.

== Same-sex marriage ==
In same-sex marriages, marriage has a more positive effect than negative. Single persons in the same-sex world happen to be more distressed. In contrast to same-sex marriage, heterosexuals have the lowest psychological distress. Lesbians, gays, and bisexuals who are not in a legalized marriages have the highest psychological distress. Marriage diminishes mental health issues between people in the same-sex community. Children who are raised in such marriages grow with the same beneficial experiences when compared to children raised in heterosexual marriages. Science shows that there is no reason to deny such people marriage, however there is scientific research show there are adverse effects when denying heterosexual couples to marry.

== Polygamy ==
Polygamous marriages can have negative effects on women and are illegal in many countries. Many women experience feelings of neglect and jealousy. Men, often, are not fair when it comes to equally splitting their time in these marriages, though they may desire to be. It is possible that women rarely see their husbands or have their needs met. This not only applies to women, but also their children. The severity of the negative effects depend on the tolerance and patience of the wife. In more serious cases, it can range from depression, tantrums, or illness. All of the previously mentioned feelings and conditions can certainly affect men too. There are also pros for either sex when they are in a polygamas marriage. For men, their sexual needs are met more fully, and society views the man as more successful. For women, it is a decrease in individual household chores and less pressure to provide many healthy and fit children. As a household, they have shown to have better choice and availability of food as well as they often times have healthier children.

== Differences between sex, race, and education ==
In opposition to men, women are more likely to get married and remarried. Women are also more likely to get married younger. Caucasians marry at a higher rate, then Asian, Hispanic, American Indian and lastly African Americans; listed in decreasing order. For each race, marriage numbers jump immensely from ages 23–25. In comparison to Hispanics and Whites, Blacks were less likely to get married and more likely to get divorced. 70% of non-Hispanic Caucasian children and 59% of Hispanics reported to live with both parents. However, for African Americans only 1/3rd reported such findings. People who did not complete high school were less likely to get married over people who did complete high school. For those who achieved a bachelor's degree or higher, 69% did not divorce and of those with such degrees 29.7% got divorces. About 48% of those who graduated high school and/or got an Associate's degree, got divorced. The more education one has, the later in life they are to get married.

== Divorce ==
As time goes on, many changes have affected divorce and marriage rates. 2000 divorce was 4.0 per 1,000 people, 2015 down to 3.1 per 1,000, in 2018 it went down again to 2.9 per 1,000, and in 2020 it is 3.0 per 1,000. Divorce rates decline as educational attainment increases. It is also said that people who marry later in life are less inclined to get divorced. The Coronavirus disease has caused the divorce rates to jump an additional 34% compared to previous years in the United States.

== See also ==
- Civil union
- Cohabitation
- Domestic partnership
- Common-law marriage
