= Love Malaysia Party =

Love Malaysia Party ڤرتي چينتا مليسيا
- Malay name: Parti Cinta Malaysia
- Chinese name: 馬來西亞愛國黨 马来西亚爱国党; Mǎláixīyǎ àiguó dǎng
- Tamil name: மலேசிய அன்புக் கட்சி
- Abbreviation: PCM
- President: Huan Cheng Guan
- Secretary-General: Prabakaran A/L Krishnan
- Deputy President: 0
- Founder: 0
- Founded: June 8, 2009
- Split from: • Parti Gerakan Rakyat Malaysia (GERAKAN) • Parti Sarawak Bersatu (PSB) • Parti Bansa Dayak Sarawak (PBDS)
- Preceded by: 0
- Succeeded by: 0
- Headquarters: Bukit Mertajam, Malaysia
- Membership (2022): 58,890
- Ideology: National conservatism
- Political position: Centre-right
- National affiliation: Barisan Nasional (allied partner); Perikatan Nasional (allied partner)
- Colours: Green, blue, red, yellow
- Anthem: 0
- Dewan Negara: 0 / 70
- Dewan Rakyat: 0 / 222
- Dewan Undangan Negeri: 0 / 607

Election symbol
- Barisan Nasional.png

Website
- Official Facebook

The Love Malaysia Party is a Malaysian political party formed on June 8, 2009.

Its members include former Gerakan vice-president and Member of Parliament Huan Cheng Guan, and former Sarawak State Assembly independent member for Ngemah seat; Gabriel Adit Demong. For the first time ever, the party contested the Sarawak state election, 2011 using its own logo after approval was given by the Election Commission. However, party lost its only seat, Ngemah, by 995 votes to Barisan Nasional, and their candidates were defeated in other seats such as Simunjan, Balai Ringin, Machan and Bekenu. Despite the defeat, PCM had contested in various seats in Penang and other states in Malaysia as well in the 13th General Elections. During the 13th Malaysian general election, 2013, PCM failed to win any of the seats its candidates contested, with most candidates further losing their deposits. As a result, the party closed all its service centres in the state of Penang. In the 14th Malaysian general election, 2018, PCM become Gagasan Sejahtera's strategic partner, and again lost in all the seats it had contested, with their candidates losing their deposits. As a result, the party is unrepresented in the Dewan Rakyat and state legislative assemblies of Malaysia. Huan Cheng Guan also resigned from PCM Deputy President and quit active politics on 14 May 2018 in keeping his promise as Lim Guan Eng is out of Penang.

== Leadership structure ==
- President:
  - Huan Cheng Guan
- Deputy Presidents:
- Vice-Presidents:
- Secretary-General:
  - Prabakaran A/L Krishnan
- Treasurer:
- Information Chief:
- Organising Secretary:
- Director of Communications:
- Director of Electoral Strategies:
- Central Committee Members:

== General election results ==
Election	Total seats won	Seats contested	Total votes	Voting Percentage	Outcome of election	Election leader
2013	0 / 222	3	2,129	0.02%	0 seat; No representation in Parliament	Huan Cheng Guan
2018	0 / 222	1	502	0.00%	0 seat; No representation in Parliament (Gagasan Sejahtera)	Huan Cheng Guan
2022	0 / 222	1	5,417	0.03%	0 seat; No representation in Parliament (Friends of BN)	Huan Cheng Guan

== See also ==
- List of political parties in Malaysia
