= Bukit Gelugor (federal constituency) =

Malaysian federal constituency

Bukit Gelugor (P051)
Penang constituency

Federal constituency
- Legislature: Dewan Rakyat
- MP: Ramkarpal Singh; PH
- Constituency created: 2003
- First contested: 2004
- Last contested: 2022

Demographics
- Population (2020): 201,005
- Electors (2023): 117,393
- Area (km²): 32
- Pop. density (per km²): 6,281.4

Bukit Gelugor is a federal constituency in Northeast Penang Island District, Penang, Malaysia, that has been represented in the Dewan Rakyat since 2004.

The federal constituency was created in the 2003 redistribution and is mandated to return a single member to the Dewan Rakyat under the first past the post voting system.

== Demographics ==
https://live.chinapress.com.my/ge15/parliament/PENANG

Ethnic breakdown of Bukit Gelugor's electorate as of 2022
1. Chinese (71.7%)
2. Malay (14.6%)
3. Indian (12.9%)
4. Other ethnicities (0.80%)

As of 2020, Bukit Gelugor has a population of 201,005 people.

Age breakdown of Bukit Gelugor's electorate as of 2022
1. 18-20 (4.76%)
2. 21-29 (17.0%)
3. 30-39 (19.2%)
4. 40-49 (18.6%)
5. 50-59 (16.4%)
6. 60-69 (13.1%)
7. 70-79 (7.75%)
8. 80-89 (2.72%)
9. above 90 (0.50%)
Gender breakdown of Bukit Gelugor's electorate as of 2022
1. Male (47.8%)
2. Female (52.2%)

== History ==
=== Polling districts ===
According to the federal gazette issued on 18 July 2023, the Bukit Gelugor constituency is divided into 27 polling districts.

| State constituency | Polling districts | Code | Location |
|---|---|---|---|
| Seri Delima (N32) | Kampong Hijau | 051/32/01 | SK Batu Lanchang |
| Seri Delima (N32) | Island Park | 051/32/02 | SMJK Chung Hwa Confucian |
| Seri Delima (N32) | Lintang Delima | 051/32/03 | SMK Hamid Khan |
| Seri Delima (N32) | Lorong Delima | 051/32/04 | SMK Hamid Khan |
| Seri Delima (N32) | Bukit Gelugor | 051/32/05 | SK Bukit Gelugor |
| Seri Delima (N32) | Taman Tun Sardon | 051/32/06 | SMK Datuk Hj. Mohamed Nor Ahmad |
| Seri Delima (N32) | Sungai Gelugor | 051/32/07 | SK Sungai Gelugor |
| Air Itam (N33) | Ayer Itam | 051/33/01 | SJK (C) Kong Min Cawangan Satu |
| Air Itam (N33) | Happy Valley | 051/33/02 | SJK (C) Chiao Nan |
| Air Itam (N33) | Jalan Kampong Pisang | 051/33/03 | SK Sri Aman |
| Air Itam (N33) | Kampong Melayu | 051/33/04 | SK Ayer Itam |
| Air Itam (N33) | Jalan Chor Sin Kheng | 051/33/05 | SM Chung Ling (Persendirian) |
| Air Itam (N33) | Thean Teik | 051/33/06 | SJK (C) Sin Kang |
| Air Itam (N33) | Zoo Road | 051/33/07 | SMJK Chung Ling Pulau Pinang |
| Air Itam (N33) | Jalan Shaik Madar | 051/33/08 | SMJK Chung Ling Pulau Pinang |
| Air Itam (N33) | Cheeseman Road | 051/33/09 | SMK Georgetown |
| Paya Terubong (N34) | Paya Terubong Mukim 14 | 051/34/01 | SJK (C) Kong Min Cawangan Kedua |
| Paya Terubong (N34) | Sungai Dondang | 051/34/02 | SMK Air Itam; SK Seri Indah |
| Paya Terubong (N34) | Paya Terubong Mukim 13 | 051/34/03 | SJK (C) Kong Min Cawangan Kedua |
| Paya Terubong (N34) | Taman Paya Terubong | 051/54/04 | Tanah Lapang Lot 5208 (5.384250°N 100.276222°E) |
| Paya Terubong (N34) | Relau | 051/34/05 | SK Seri Relau |
| Paya Terubong (N34) | Desa Baiduri | 051/34/06 | Dewan Komuniti Blok 1B Desa Baiduri |
| Paya Terubong (N34) | Desa Intan | 051/34/07 | Dewan Komuniti Blok 7A Desa Intan |
| Paya Terubong (N34) | Semarak Api 1 | 051/34/08 | Dewan Komuniti Blok 4E Semarak Api |
| Paya Terubong (N34) | Jln Semarak Api | 051/34/09 | Dewan Komuniti Blok 4B Semarak Api |
| Paya Terubong (N34) | Bukit Awana | 051/34/10 | Ruang Legar Rumah Pangsa Taman Paya Terubong |
| Paya Terubong (N34) | Terubong Jaya | 051/34/11 | Tapak Pasar Malam Tkt Paya Terubong Wayton |

=== Representation history ===
Members of Parliament for Bukit Gelugor
| Parliament | No | Years | Member | Party | Vote Share |
Constituency created from Bukit Bendera and Bayan Baru
| 11th | P051 | 2004–2008 | Karpal Singh Ram Singh (ਕਰਪਾਲ ਸਿੰਘ) | DAP | 22,529; 51.44% |
| 12th | P051 | 2008–2013 | Karpal Singh Ram Singh (ਕਰਪਾਲ ਸਿੰਘ) | PR (DAP) | 35,140; 71.33% |
| 13th | P051 | 2013–2014 | Karpal Singh Ram Singh (ਕਰਪਾਲ ਸਿੰਘ) | PR (DAP) | 56,303; 80.55% |
| 13th | P051 | 2014–2015 | Ramkarpal Singh Karpal Singh (ਰਾਮਕਰ ਪਾਲ ਸਿੰਘ) | PR (DAP) | 41,242; 89.95% |
| 13th | P051 | 2015–2018 | Ramkarpal Singh Karpal Singh (ਰਾਮਕਰ ਪਾਲ ਸਿੰਘ) | PH (DAP) | 41,242; 89.95% |
| 14th | P051 | 2018–2022 | Ramkarpal Singh Karpal Singh (ਰਾਮਕਰ ਪਾਲ ਸਿੰਘ) | PH (DAP) | 65,622; 86.68% |
| 15th | P051 | 2022–present | Ramkarpal Singh Karpal Singh (ਰਾਮਕਰ ਪਾਲ ਸਿੰਘ) | PH (DAP) | 71,204; 82.73% |

=== State constituency ===
| Parliamentary constituency | State constituency | | | | | | |
| Parliamentary constituency | 1955–1959* | 1959–1974 | 1974–1986 | 1986–1995 | 1995–2004 | 2004–2018 | 2018–present |
|---|---|---|---|---|---|---|---|
| Bukit Gelugor | | | | | | Air Itam | |
| Bukit Gelugor | | | | | | Paya Terubong | |
| Bukit Gelugor | | | | | | Seri Delima | |

=== Historical boundaries ===
| State Constituency | Area | |
| State Constituency | 2003 | 2018 |
|---|---|---|
| Air Itam | Air Itam; Happy Valley; Kampung Melayu; Kampung Pisang; Thean Teik | |
| Paya Terubong | Bukit Awana; Desa Baiduri; Paya Terubong; Relau; Sungai Dondang | |
| Seri Delima | Bukit Gelugor; Bukit Tunku Kudin; Island Park; Seri Delima; Taman Tun Sardon | |

=== Current state assembly members ===
| No. | State Constituency | Member | Coalition (Party) |
|---|---|---|---|
| N32 | Seri Delima | Connie Tan Hooi Peng | PH (DAP) |
| N33 | Air Itam | Joseph Ng Soon Siang | PH (DAP) |
| N34 | Paya Terubong | Wong Hon Wai | PH (DAP) |

=== Local governments & postcodes ===
| No. | State Constituency | Local Government | Postcode |
|---|---|---|---|
| N32 | Seri Delima | Penang Island City Council | 11060, 11400 Penang; 11500 Ayer Itam; 11600 Jelutong |
| N33 | Air Itam | Penang Island City Council | 11060, 11400 Penang; 11500 Ayer Itam; 11600 Jelutong |
| N34 | Paya Terubong | Penang Island City Council | 11060, 11400 Penang; 11500 Ayer Itam; 11600 Jelutong |

== Election results ==
Malaysian general election, 2022
| Party | Candidate | Votes | % | ∆% |
|---|---|---|---|---|
| PH | Ramkarpal Singh Karpal Singh | 71,204 | 82.73 | ▲82.73 |
| PN | Thinagaranabhan Padmanabhan | 8,092 | 9.40 | ▲9.40 |
| BN | Wong Chin Chong | 6,777 | 7.87 | ▼4.90 |
| Total valid votes | | 86,073 | 100.00 | |
| Total rejected ballots | | 1,170 | | |
| Unreturned ballots | | 339 | | |
| Turnout | | 91,217 | 76.90 | ▼6.61 |
| Registered electors | | 117,134 | | |
| Majority | | 63,112 | 73.33 | ▼0.58 |
| PH hold | | Swing | | |
Source(s) https://lom.agc.gov.my/ilims/upload/portal/akta/outputp/1753273/PUB609%20(2022).pdf

Malaysian general election, 2018
| Party | Candidate | Votes | % | ∆% |
|---|---|---|---|---|
| PKR | Ramkarpal Singh Karpal Singh | 65,622 | 86.68 | ▲86.68 |
| BN | Low Joo Hiap | 9,671 | 12.77 | ▼6.68 |
| BERSAMA | Lai Xue Ching | 412 | 0.54 | ▲0.54 |
| Total valid votes | | 75,705 | 100.00 | |
| Total rejected ballots | | 528 | | |
| Unreturned ballots | | 256 | | |
| Turnout | | 76,489 | 83.51 | ▲27.17 |
| Registered electors | | 91,595 | | |
| Majority | | 55,951 | 73.91 | ▼8.23 |
| PKR hold | | Swing | | |
Source(s) "His Majesty's Government Gazette - Notice of Contested Election, Parliament for the State of Penang [P.U. (B) 236/2018]" (PDF). Attorney General's Chambers of Malaysia. 3 May 2018. "Federal Government Gazette - Results of Contested Election and Statements of the Poll after the Official Addition of Votes, Parliamentary Constituencies for the State of Penang [P.U. (B) 310/2018]" (PDF). Attorney General's Chambers of Malaysia. 28 May 2018.

Malaysian general by-election, 25 May 2014 Upon the death of incumbent, Karpal Singh
| Party | Candidate | Votes | % | ∆% |
|---|---|---|---|---|
| DAP | Ramkarpal Singh Karpal Singh | 41,242 | 89.95 | ▲9.44 |
| Love Malaysia Party | Huan Cheng Guan | 3,583 | 7.81 | ▲7.81 |
| Independent | Mohamed Nabi Bux Mohamed Nabi Abdul Sathar | 799 | 1.74 | ▲1.74 |
| Independent | Abu Backer Sidek Mohammad Zan | 225 | 0.49 | ▲0.49 |
| Total valid votes | | 45,849 | 100.00 | |
| Total rejected ballots | | 539 | | |
| Unreturned ballots | | 50 | | |
| Turnout | | 46,438 | 56.34 | ▼29.97 |
| Registered electors | | 82,431 | | |
| Majority | | 37,659 | 82.14 | ▲21.04 |
| DAP hold | | Swing | | |
Source(s) "Pilihan Raya Kecil P.051 Bukit Gelugor". Election Commission of Malaysia. "Federal Government Gazette - Notice of Contested Election - By-election of the Dewan Rakyat of P.051 Bukit Gelugor for the State of Penang [P.U. (B) 215/2014]" (PDF). Attorney General's Chambers of Malaysia. 14 May 2014. "P. U. (B) 250/2014 Federal Government Gazette - Results of Contested Election and Statement of the Poll after the Official Addition of Votes for the By-election of P.051 Bukit Gelugor" (PDF). Attorney General's Chambers of Malaysia. 28 May 2014.

Malaysian general election, 2013
| Party | Candidate | Votes | % | ∆% |
|---|---|---|---|---|
| DAP | Karpal Singh Ram Singh | 56,303 | 80.55 | ▲9.22 |
| BN | Teh Beng Yeam | 13,597 | 19.45 | ▼9.22 |
| Total valid votes | | 69,900 | 100.00 | |
| Total rejected ballots | | 654 | | |
| Unreturned ballots | | 129 | | |
| Turnout | | 70,683 | 86.31 | ▲9.26 |
| Registered electors | | 81,897 | | |
| Majority | | 42,706 | 61.10 | ▲18.44 |
| DAP hold | | Swing | | |
Source(s) "Federal Government Gazette - Notice of Contested Election, Parliament for the State of Penang [P.U. (B) 173/2013]" (PDF). Attorney General's Chambers of Malaysia. 26 April 2013. "Federal Government Gazette - Results of Contested Election and Statements of the Poll after the Official Addition of Votes, Parliamentary Constituencies for the State of Penang [P.U. (B) 214/2013]" (PDF). Attorney General's Chambers of Malaysia. 22 May 2013. Archived from the original (PDF) on 22 March 2019.

Malaysian general election, 2008
| Party | Candidate | Votes | % | ∆% |
|---|---|---|---|---|
| DAP | Karpal Singh Ram Singh | 35,140 | 71.33 | ▲19.89 |
| BN | Koay Kar Huah | 14,125 | 28.67 | ▼19.89 |
| Total valid votes | | 49,265 | 100.00 | |
| Total rejected ballots | | 707 | | |
| Unreturned ballots | | 581 | | |
| Turnout | | 50,553 | 77.05 | ▲2.84 |
| Registered electors | | 65,614 | | |
| Majority | | 21,015 | 42.66 | ▲39.78 |
| DAP hold | | Swing | | |

Malaysian general election, 2004
| Party | Candidate | Votes | % |
|---|---|---|---|
| DAP | Karpal Singh Ram Singh | 22,529 | 51.44 |
| BN | Lim Boo Chang | 21,268 | 48.56 |
| Total valid votes | | 43,797 | 100.00 |
| Total rejected ballots | | 793 | |
| Unreturned ballots | | 28 | |
| Turnout | | 44,618 | 74.21 |
| Registered electors | | 60,123 | |
| Majority | | 1,261 | 2.88 |
This was a new constituency created.
