= Members of the Dewan Rakyat, 14th Malaysian Parliament =

14th Parliament of Malaysia
←	13th Parliament	15th Parliament	→

Overview
- Legislative body: Parliament of Malaysia
- Jurisdiction: Malaysia
- Meeting place: Malaysian Houses of Parliament
- Term: 16 July 2018 – 10 October 2022
- Election: 2018 general election
- Government: Seventh Mahathir cabinet (until 24 February 2020); Muhyiddin cabinet (until 16 August 2021); Ismail Sabri cabinet
- Website: www.parlimen.gov.my

Dewan Rakyat
- Members: 222
- Speaker: Mohamad Ariff Md Yusof (until 13 July 2020); Azhar Azizan Harun
- Deputy Speaker: Mohd Rashid Hasnon; Nga Kor Ming (until 13 July 2020); Azalina Othman Said (until 23 August 2021)
- Secretary: Roosme Hamzah (until 5 December 2019); Riduan Rahmat (12 May 2020); Nizam Mydin Bacha Mydin
- Prime Minister: Mahathir Mohamad (until 24 February 2020) (Interim: 24 February – 1 March 2020); Muhyiddin Yassin (until 16 August 2021) (Caretaker: 16 – 20 August 2021); Ismail Sabri Yaakob
- Leader of the Opposition: Ahmad Zahid Hamidi (until 11 March 2019); Ismail Sabri Yaakob (until 24 February 2020); Anwar Ibrahim
- Party control: Pakatan Harapan (until 24 February 2020); Perikatan Nasional (until 16 August 2021); Barisan Nasional

Sovereign
- Yang di-Pertuan Agong: Sultan Muhammad V (until 6 January 2019); Sultan Nazrin Mu'izzuddin Shah (Acting: 6 – 31 January 2019); Al-Sultan Abdullah Ri'ayatuddin Al-Mustafa Billah Shah

Sessions
- 1st: 1st Meeting: 16 July 2018 – 16 August 2018; 2nd Meeting: 15 October 2018 – 11 December 2018
- 2nd: 1st Meeting: 11 March 2019 – 11 April 2019; 2nd Meeting: 1 July 2019 – 18 July 2019; 3rd Meeting: 7 October 2019 – 5 December 2019
- 3rd: 1st Meeting: 18 May 2020; 2nd Meeting: 13 July 2020 – 27 August 2020; 3rd Meeting : 2 November 2020 – 17 December 2020; Special Meeting : 26 July 2021 – 29 July 2021
- 4th: 1st Meeting: 13 September 2021 – 12 October 2021; 2nd Meeting: 25 October 2021 – 20 December 2021; Special Meeting: 20 January 2022
- 5th: 1st Meeting: 28 February 2022 – 24 March 2022; Special Meeting: 11 April 2022; 2nd Meeting: 18 July 2022 – 4 August 2022; 3rd Meeting: 3 October 2022 – 7 October 2022

This is a list of the members of the Dewan Rakyat (House of Representatives) of the 14th Parliament of Malaysia, elected in 2018.

== Compositions ==
=== Outcomes of the 14th general election ===
Members of Dewan Rakyat as elected in 2018 by federal constituency

Equal-area representation of members of Dewan Rakyat as elected in 2018 by federal constituency

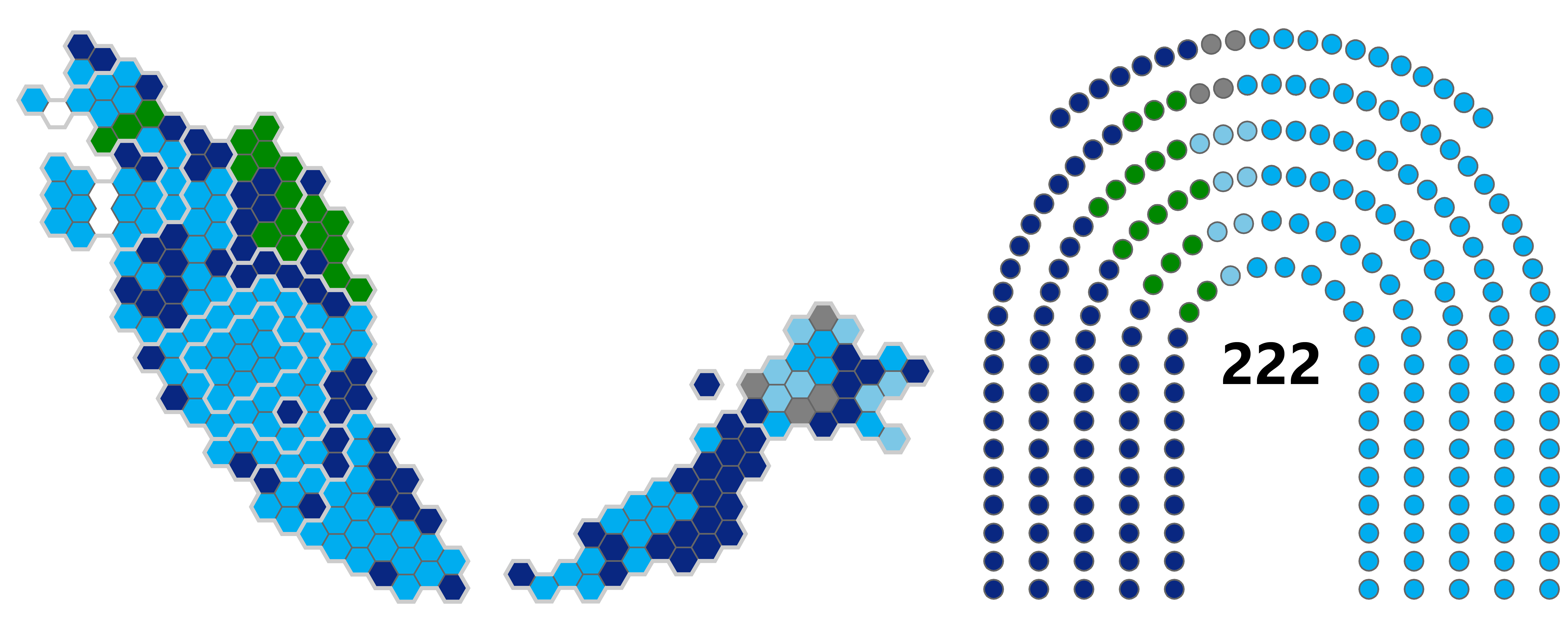

Government (121)			Opposition (101)
104	9	8	79	18	1	3
PKR	DAP	WARISAN	BN	PAS	STAR	IND

Beginning of the 14th Parliament of Malaysia 16 July 2018
State and federal territories	# of seats	PKR seats	BN seats	PAS seats	DAP seats	WARISAN seats	IND seats	STAR seats
Perlis	3	1	2	0	0	0	0	0
Kedah	15	10	2	3	0	0	0	0
Kelantan	14	0	5	9	0	0	0	0
Terengganu	8	0	2	6	0	0	0	0
Penang	13	11	2	0	0	0	0	0
Perak	24	13	11	0	0	0	0	0
Pahang	14	5	9	0	0	0	0	0
Selangor	22	20	2	0	0	0	0	0
Kuala Lumpur	11	10	0	0	0	0	1	0
Putrajaya	1	0	1	0	0	0	0	0
Negeri Sembilan	8	5	3	0	0	0	0	0
Malacca	6	4	2	0	0	0	0	0
Johor	26	18	8	0	0	0	0	0
Labuan	1	0	1	0	0	0	0	0
Sabah	25	3	10	0	3	8	0	1
Sarawak	31	4	19	0	6	0	2	0
Total	222	104	79	18	9	8	3	1

=== Composition before dissolution ===

Government + Confidence & Supply (115)															Opposition (104)
BN				PN		GPS				GRS			PBM	IND	PH				WARISAN	GTA	PSB	MUDA	BN
40				39		19				8			6	3	90				7	4	1	1	1
36	2	1	1	22	17	14	2	2	1	6	1	1	6	3	42	36	11	1	7	4	1	1	1
UMNO	MCA	MIC	PBRS	BERSATU	PAS	PBB	PRS	PDP	SUPP	BERSATU	PBS	STAR	PBM	IND	DAP	PKR	AMANAH	UPKO	WARISAN	PEJUANG	PSB	MUDA	UMNO

Dissolution of the 14th Parliament of Malaysia 10 October 2022
State and federal territories	# of seats	BN + Confidence & Supply seats	PH seats	WARISAN seats	PEJUANG seats	PSB seats	MUDA seats	BN (unclear) seats	VAC seats
Perlis	3	2	1	0	0	0	0	0	0
Kedah	15	5	7	0	3	0	0	0	0
Kelantan	14	13	0	0	0	0	0	1	0
Terengganu	8	8	0	0	0	0	0	0	0
Penang	13	3	10	0	0	0	0	0	0
Perak	24	11	12	0	0	0	0	0	1
Pahang	14	10	4	0	0	0	0	0	0
Selangor	22	6	16	0	0	0	0	0	0
Kuala Lumpur	11	2	9	0	0	0	0	0	0
Putrajaya	1	1	0	0	0	0	0	0	0
Negeri Sembilan	8	4	4	0	0	0	0	0	0
Malacca	6	3	3	0	0	0	0	0	0
Johor	26	13	11	0	1	0	1	0	0
Labuan	1	0	0	1	0	0	0	0	0
Sabah	25	12	6	6	0	0	0	0	1
Sarawak	31	22	7	0	0	2	0	0	0
Total	222	115	90	7	4	2	1	1	2

=== Last election pendulum ===
(Results and status at 9 May 2018) The 14th General Election witnessed 124 governmental seats and 98 non-governmental seats filled the Dewan Rakyat. The government side has 49 safe seats and 11 fairly safe seats, while the other side has 21 safe seats and 4 fairly safe seats.

GOVERNMENT SEATS
Marginal
Parit Buntar	Dr. Mujahid Yusof Rawa	AMANAH	39.22
Temerloh	Anuar Mohd. Tahir	AMANAH	39.31
Lubok Antu	Jugah Muyang @ Tambat	IND	40.09
Lumut	Dr. Mohd. Hatta Md. Ramli	AMANAH	40.93
Pokok Sena	Mahfuz Omar	AMANAH	40.93
Sungai Besar	Muslimin Yahya	BERSATU	42.11
Jerlun	Dr. Mukhriz Mahathir	BERSATU	42.55
Kulim-Bandar Baharu	Saifuddin Nasution Ismail	PKR	42.62
Merbok	Nurin Aina Abdullah	PKR	43.31
Tambun	Ahmad Faizal Azumu	BERSATU	44.46
Kuantan	Fuziah Salleh	PKR	44.57
Kuala Pilah	Eddin Syazlee Shith	BERSATU	44.85
Indera Mahkota	Saifuddin Abdullah	PKR	44.85
Raub	Tengku Zulpuri Shah Raja Puji	DAP	44.89
Kapar	Abdullah Sani Abdul Hamid	PKR	44.99
Ranau	Jonathan Yasin	PKR	45.17
Padang Serai	Karuppaiya Muthusamy	PKR	45.27
Tanjong Malim	Chang Lih Kang	PKR	45.44
Putatan	Awang Husaini Sahari	PKR	45.81
Kuala Kedah	Dr. Azman Ismail	PKR	46.26
Tampin	Hasan Bahrom	AMANAH	46.29
Bentong	Wong Tack	DAP	46.67
Kangar	Noor Amin Ahmad	PKR	46.80
Tangga Batu	Dr. Rusnah Aluai	PKR	46.89
Tanjung Piai	Dr. Md. Farid Md. Rafik	BERSATU	47.29
Titiwangsa	Rina Mohd. Harun	BERSATU	47.31
Hulu Selangor	June Leow Hsiad Hui	PKR	47.86
Papar	Ahmad Hassan	WARISAN	48.54
Sri Gading	Dr. Shahruddin Mohd. Salleh	BERSATU	48.58
Sungai Siput	Kesavan Subramaniam	PKR	48.72
Kuala Langat	Xavier Jayakumar Arulanandam	PKR	49.08
Sungai Petani	Johari Abdul	PKR	49.21
Kubang Pasu	Ir. Amiruddin Hamzah	BERSATU	49.70
Kuala Selangor	Dr. Dzulkefly Ahmad	AMANAH	49.98
Tawau	Christina Liew Chin Jin	PKR	50.05
Kalabakan	Ma'mun Sulaiman	WARISAN	50.09
Lembah Pantai	Ahmad Fahmi Mohamed Fadzil	PKR	50.24
Simpang Renggam	Dr. Maszlee Malik	BERSATU	50.69
Alor Gajah	Mohd. Redzuan Md. Yusof	BERSATU	50.73
Alor Setar	Chan Ming Kai	PKR	50.80
Kota Belud	Isnaraissah Munirah Majilis @ Fakharuddy	WARISAN	50.82
Permatang Pauh	Nurul Izzah Anwar	PKR	50.89
Hang Tuah Jaya	Shamsul Iskandar @ Yusre Mohd. Akin	PKR	51.01
Tenom	Noorita Sual	DAP	51.10
Selangau	Baru Bian	PKR	51.11
Balik Pulau	Muhammad Bakthiar Wan Chik	PKR	51.17
Sepang	Mohamed Hanipa Maidin	AMANAH	51.56
Sekijang	Natrah Ismail	PKR	51.69
Labis	Pang Hok Liong	DAP	52.17
Saratok	Ali Biju	PKR	52.18
Ledang	Syed Ibrahim Syed Noh	PKR	53.06
Segamat	Edmund Santhara Kumar Ramanaidu	PKR	53.09
Muar	Syed Saddiq Syed Abdul Rahman	BERSATU	53.09
Sarikei	Wong Ling Biu	DAP	53.57
Silam	Mohamaddin Ketapi	WARISAN	54.26
Teluk Intan	David Nga Kor Ming	DAP	54.37
Puncak Borneo	Willie Mongin	PKR	54.65
Langkawi	Dr. Mahathir Mohamad	BERSATU	54.90
Pagoh	Muhyiddin Mohd. Yassin	BERSATU	55.21
Julau	Larry Soon @ Larry S'ng Wei Shien	IND	55.28
Hulu Langat	Hasanuddin Mohd. Yunus	AMANAH	55.53
Batu Sapi	Liew Vui Keong	WARISAN	55.78
Batu Pahat	Mohd. Rashid Hasnon	PKR	55.92
Sungai Buloh	Sivarasa K. Rasiah	PKR	55.97
Fairly safe
Setiawangsa	Nik Nazmi Nik Ahmad	PKR	56.65
Mas Gading	Mordi Bimol	DAP	56.71
Nibong Tebal	Mansor Othman	PKR	56.92
Wangsa Maju	Dr. Tan Yee Kew	PKR	57.30
Kampar	Thomas Su Keong Siong	DAP	57.56
Bandar Tun Razak	Kamarudin Jaffar	PKR	58.58
Pasir Gudang	Hassan Abdul Karim	PKR	58.68
Port Dickson	Danyal Balagopal Abdullah	PKR	59.06
Kluang	Wong Shu Qi	DAP	59.20
Sepanggar	Mohd. Azis Jamman	WARISAN	59.47
Sibu	Oscar Ling Chai Yew	DAP	59.58
Safe
Shah Alam	Khalid Abdul Samad	AMANAH	60.00
Seremban	Anthony Loke Siew Fook	DAP	60.45
Batu	Prabakaran M. Parameswaran	PKR	60.70
Selayang	William Leong Jee Keen	PKR	61.38
Taiping	Teh Kok Lim	DAP	61.65
Gopeng	Dr. Lee Boon Chye	PKR	61.75
Miri	Dr. Michael Teo Yu Keng	PKR	61.82
Johor Bahru	Akmal Nasrullah Mohd. Nasir	PKR	62.31
Bakri	Yeo Bee Yin	DAP	62.65
Gombak	Mohamed Azmin Ali	PKR	63.10
Stampin	Chong Chieng Jen	DAP	63.70
Pulai	Salahuddin Ayub	AMANAH	63.81
Lanang	Alice Lau Yiong Kieng	DAP	65.16
Kulai	Teo Nie Ching	DAP	65.42
Bangi	Dr. Ong Kian Ming	DAP	65.60
Sandakan	Stephen Wong Tien Fatt	DAP	67.97
Beruas	James Ngeh Koo Ham	DAP	68.41
Petaling Jaya	Maria Chin Abdullah	PKR	68.52
Bayan Baru	Sim Tze Tzin	PKR	68.88
Iskandar Puteri	Lim Kit Siang	DAP	69.24
Kota Raja	Mohamad Sabu	AMANAH	70.79
Ampang	Zuraida Kamaruddin	PKR	70.94
Puchong	Gobind Singh Deo	DAP	72.39
Rasah	Cha Kee Chin	DAP	72.45
Kota Melaka	Khoo Poay Tiong	DAP	72.68
Kota Kinabalu	Chan Foong Hin	DAP	74.76
Penampang	Ignatius Dorell @ Darell Leiking	WARISAN	75.32
Pandan	Dr. Wan Azizah Wan Ismail	PKR	75.47
Klang	Charles Anthony R. Santiago	DAP	77.34
Batu Kawan	Kasthuriraani P. Patto	DAP	78.02
Bandar Kuching	Dr. Kelvin Yii Lee Wuen	DAP	79.43
Jelutong	Sanisvara Nethaji Rayer Rajaji	DAP	79.63
Semporna	Mohd. Shafie Apdal	WARISAN	80.20
Ipoh Timor	Wong Kah Woh	DAP	80.46
Segambut	Hannah Yeoh Tseow Suan	DAP	82.07
Subang	Wong Chen	PKR	83.08
Bukit Bendera	Wong Hon Wai	DAP	83.83
Batu Gajah	Sivakumar M. Varatharaju Naidu	DAP	84.17
Ipoh Barat	Kulasegaran V. Murugeson	DAP	84.90
Bukit Bintang	Fong Kui Lun	DAP	84.94
Bukit Mertajam	Steven Sim Chee Keong	DAP	85.40
Bagan	Lim Guan Eng	DAP	85.96
Bukit Gelugor	Ramkarpal Singh	DAP	86.68
Tanjong	Chow Kon Yeow	DAP	87.25
Damansara	Tony Pua Kiam Wee	DAP	89.00
Cheras	Tan Kok Wai	DAP	89.00
Seputeh	Teresa Kok Suh Sim	DAP	89.97
Kepong	Lim Lip Eng	DAP	92.04

NON-GOVERNMENT SEATS
Marginal
Keningau	Dr. Jeffrey Gapari @ Geoffrey Kitingan	STAR	33.09
Jerai	Sabri Azit	PAS	33.94
Tasek Gelugor	Shabudin Yahaya	UMNO	35.73
Bagan Serai	Dr. Noor Azmi Ghazali	UMNO	36.44
Kota Marudu	Dr. Maximus Johnity Ongkili	PBS	38.44
Sabak Bernam	Mohamad Fasiah Mohd. Fakeh	UMNO	38.57
Bukit Gantang	Syed Abu Hussin Hafiz Syed Abdul Fasal	UMNO	39.48
Kuala Kangsar	Mastura Mohd. Yazid	UMNO	40.26
Padang Besar	Zahidi Zainul Abidin	UMNO	41.18
Padang Rengas	Mohamed Nazri Abdul Aziz	UMNO	41.50
Beaufort	Azizah Mohd. Dun	UMNO	41.72
Arau	Dr. Shahidan Kassim	UMNO	41.79
Padang Terap	Mahdzir Khalid	UMNO	42.09
Kota Bharu	Takiyuddin Hassan	PAS	42.24
Cameron Highlands	Sivarajjh Chandran	MIC	42.30
Baling	Abdul Azeez Abdul Rahim	UMNO	42.60
Pendang	Awang Hashim	PAS	42.69
Kepala Batas	Reezal Merican Naina Merican	UMNO	42.94
Jasin	Ahmad Hamzah	UMNO	43.00
Paya Besar	Mohd. Shahar Abdullah	UMNO	43.16
Tanjong Karang	Noh Omar	UMNO	43.45
Bera	Ismail Sabri Yaakob	UMNO	43.89
Ayer Hitam	Dr. Ir. Wee Ka Siong	MCA	43.98
Kemaman	Che Alias Hamid	PAS	44.06
Tapah	Saravanan Murugan	MIC	44.47
Jerantut	Ahmad Nazlan Idris	UMNO	45.06
Larut	Hamzah Zainudin	UMNO	45.90
Pasir Salak	Tajuddin Abd Rahman	UMNO	46.04
Pontian	Ahmad Maslan	UMNO	46.21
Jempol	Mohd. Salim Shariff	UMNO	46.83
Kuala Krau	Dr. Ismail Mohamed Said	UMNO	47.14
Machang	Ahmad Jazlan Yaakub	UMNO	47.39
Pasir Puteh	Dr. Nik Muhammad Zawawi Salleh	PAS	47.41
Labuan	Rozman Isli	UMNO	47.59
Kimanis	Anifah Aman	UMNO	47.71
Sik	Ahmad Tarmizi Sulaiman	PAS	47.91
Ketereh	Annuar Musa	UMNO	47.95
Pensiangan	Arthur Joseph Kurup	PBRS	48.35
Besut	Idris Jusoh	UMNO	48.40
Parit	Mohd. Nizar Zakaria	UMNO	48.41
Tanah Merah	Ikmal Hisham Abdul Aziz	UMNO	48.44
Gerik	Hasbullah Osman	UMNO	48.49
Sipitang	Yamani Hafez Musa	UMNO	48.60
Gua Musang	Tengku Razaleigh Tengku Mohd. Hamzah	UMNO	48.64
Setiu	Shaharizukirnain Abd. Kadir	PAS	48.65
Rembau	Khairy Jamaluddin Abu Bakar	UMNO	48.87
Jelebu	Jalaluddin Alias	UMNO	48.93
Bachok	Nik Mohamed Abduh Nik Abdul Aziz	PAS	48.93
Maran	Dr. Ismail Abdul Muttalib	UMNO	49.09
Parit Sulong	Dr. Noraini Ahmad	UMNO	49.19
Libaran	Zakaria Mohd. Edris @ Tubau	UMNO	49.25
Putrajaya	Tengku Adnan Tengku Mansor	UMNO	49.47
Hulu Terengganu	Rosol Wahid	UMNO	49.60
Kuala Terengganu	Ahmad Amzad Mohamed @ Hashim	PAS	49.65
Lipis	Abdul Rahman Mohamad	UMNO	49.82
Kudat	Abd Rahim Bakri	UMNO	49.90
Rantau Panjang	Siti Zailah Mohd. Yusoff	PAS	50.82
Bagan Datuk	Dr. Ahmad Zahid Hamidi	UMNO	51.37
Tuaran	Wilfred Madius Tangau	UPKO	51.54
Pasir Mas	Ahmad Fadhli Shaari	PAS	52.44
Kuala Krai	Ab. Latiff Ab. Rahman	PAS	52.56
Kuala Nerus	Dr. Mohd. Khairuddin Aman Razali	PAS	52.66
Mersing	Dr. Abd. Latiff Ahmad	UMNO	53.00
Rompin	Hasan Arifin	UMNO	53.54
Lenggong	Dr. Shamsul Anuar Nasarah	UMNO	53.97
Masjid Tanah	Mas Ermieyati Samsudin	UMNO	54.10
Dungun	Wan Hassan Mohd. Ramli	PAS	54.17
Tumpat	Che Abdullah Mat Nawi	PAS	54.33
Tenggara	Dr. Adham Baba	UMNO	54.39
Baram	Anyi Ngau	PDP	54.45
Sibuti	Lukanisman Awang Sauni	PBB	54.60
Pengkalan Chepa	Ahmad Marzuk Shaary	PAS	54.88
Jeli	Mustapa Mohamed	UMNO	55.89
Fairly safe
Kubang Kerian	Tuan Ibrahim Tuan Man	PAS	56.16
Bintulu	Tiong King Sing	PDP	57.05
Sembrong	Hishammuddin Hussein	UMNO	59.24
Marang	Abd Hadi Awang	PAS	59.27
Safe
Betong	Robert Lawson Chuat Vincent Entering	PBB	60.41
Sri Aman	Masir Kujat	PSB	61.48
Pekan	Mohd. Najib Abdul Razak	UMNO	62.19
Beluran	Dr. Ronald Kiandee	UMNO	62.84
Serian	Richard Riot Jaem	SUPP	63.99
Kanowit	Aaron Ago Dagang	PRS	64.58
Petra Jaya	Fadillah Yusof	PBB	65.91
Mukah	Hanifah Hajar Taib	PBB	66.90
Kinabatangan	Bung Moktar Radin	UMNO	67.22
Pengerang	Azalina Othman Said	UMNO	67.71
Hulu Rajang	Wilson Ugak Kumbong	PRS	68.20
Kota Tinggi	Halimah Mohamed Sadique	UMNO	69.14
Kota Samarahan	Rubiah Wang	PBB	69.90
Lawas	Henry Sum Agong	PBB	70.44
Batang Lupar	Rohani Abdul Karim	PBB	70.49
Limbang	Hasbi Habibollah	PBB	72.07
Kapit	Alexander Nanta Linggi	PBB	78.91
Santubong	Dr. Wan Junaidi Tuanku Jaafar	PBB	79.28
Tanjong Manis	Yusuf Abd. Wahab	PBB	80.69
Batang Sadong	Nancy Shukri	PBB	83.25
Igan	Ahmad Johnie Zawawi	PBB	83.76

=== Changes in the composition of the Dewan Rakyat ===
Political Parties / Coalitions	PH	WARISAN	BN		GS	USA	IND		UPKO	GPS	GBS	PSB	PN	PBS	PEJUANG	PBM	MUDA	VAC	Government MPs (Note: The PH coalition with WARISAN as confidence and supply won the GE14 election on 9 May 2018. UPKO joined the government as confidence and supply on 10 May 2018. After Sheraton Move in February 2020, the new PN coalition consisting of PPBM, PAS, and STAR, with BN, GPS, and PBS as confidence and supply replaced the PH–WARISAN–UPKO government. After UMNO's withdrawal of the confidence and supply of PN in August 2021, BN once again became the government, with PN, GPS, and PBS as confidence and supply, replacing the PN–BN–GPS–PBS government. In November 2021, the newly formed PBM joins the BN government as confidence and supply.)
Results of GE14; Start of the Mahathir VII government	113	8	79		18	1	3 (Note: Prabakaran Parameswaran, Jugah Muyang, Larry Sng)		–	–	–	–	–	–	–	–	–	–	121 (Note: 112 needed for a simple majority.) (Note: PH–WARISAN)
Seat changes May 2018 – Feb 2020	▲16 (Note: 3 independent MPs join PKR.) (Note: 14 independent MPs join PPBM.) (Note: 2019 Tanjung Piai by-election – BN gains from PH)	▲1 (Note: 1 MP left UMNO to join WARISAN.)	▼37 (Note: UPKO consisting of 1 MP left the BN coalition and joined the PH government as confidence and supply.) (Note: PBB, PRS, PDP, and SUPP consisting of 19 MPs left the BN coalition and formed the GPS coalition.) (Note: PBS and PBRS consisting of 2 MPs left the BN coalition and formed the GBS coalition together with STAR, of which consists 1 MP.) (Note: 16 MPs left UMNO to become independents.) (Note: 1 MP left UMNO to join WARISAN.) (Note: 2019 Tanjung Piai by-election – BN gains from PH) (Note: 2020 Kimanis by-election – BN gains from IND)		Steady	▼1 (Note: STAR consisting of 1 MP left the USA coalition to form the GBS coalition. The USA coalition is now defunct.)	▼2 (Note: 3 independent MPs join PKR.) (Note: 16 MPs left UMNO to become independents.) (Note: 14 independent MPs join PPBM.) (Note: 2020 Kimanis by-election – BN gains from IND)		▲1 (Note: UPKO consisting of 1 MP left the BN coalition and joined the PH government as confidence and supply.)	▲18 (Note: PBB, PRS, PDP, and SUPP consisting of 19 MPs left the BN coalition and formed the GPS coalition.) (Note: 1 MP left PRS to form PSB.)	▲3 (Note: PBS and PBRS consisting of 2 MPs left the BN coalition and formed the GBS coalition together with STAR, of which consists 1 MP.)	▲1 (Note: 1 MP left PRS to form PSB.)	–	–	–	–	–	–	▲18
End of the Mahathir VII government	129	9	42		18	–	1 (Note: Syed Abu Hussin Hafiz)		1	18	3	1	–	–	–	–	–	–	139 (Note: 112 needed for a simple majority.) (Note: PH–WARISAN–UPKO)
Seat changes Feb 2020	▼37 (Note: PPBM consisting of 26 MPs left the PH coalition, resulting in the collapse of the PH-led government. 5 MPs subsequently left PPBM to become independents, while PPBM consisting of the remaining 21 MPs form the PN coalition.) (Note: 11 MPs left PKR to become independent, resulting in the collapse of the PH-led government. 10 of which aligned themselves with the PN government.)	Steady	(Note: Tengku Razaleigh Hamzah does not support the PN-led government, even though his party, UMNO, a component party of BN, is part of the government as confidence and supply. Even so, he still remains as a member of UMNO.) (Note: PBRS consisting of 1 MP left the GBS coalition and rejoins the BN coalition. The GBS coalition is now defunct.)	▲1 (Note: Tengku Razaleigh Hamzah does not support the PN-led government, even though his party, UMNO, a component party of BN, is part of the government as confidence and supply. Even so, he still remains as a member of UMNO.)	▼18 (Note: PAS consisting of 18 MPs left the GS coalition and formed the PN coalition, which replaced the PH-led government. The GS coalition is now defunct.)	–	▲10 (Note: 11 MPs left PKR to become independent, resulting in the collapse of the PH-led government. 10 of which aligned themselves with the PN government.)	▲6 (Note: PPBM consisting of 26 MPs left the PH coalition, resulting in the collapse of the PH-led government. 5 MPs subsequently left PPBM to become independents, while PPBM consisting of the remaining 21 MPs form the PN coalition.) (Note: 11 MPs left PKR to become independent, resulting in the collapse of the PH-led government. 10 of which aligned themselves with the PN government.)	Steady	Steady	▼3 (Note: PBRS consisting of 1 MP left the GBS coalition and rejoins the BN coalition. The GBS coalition is now defunct.) (Note: STAR consisting of 1 MP left the GBS coalition and forms the PN coalition. The GBS coalition is now defunct.) (Note: PBS consisting of 1 MP left the GBS coalition and joins the PN-led government as confidence and supply. The GBS coalition is now defunct.)	Steady	▲40 (Note: PPBM consisting of its remaining 21 MPs, PAS consisting of 18 MPs, and STAR consisting of 1 MP left PH, GS, and GBS respectively, form the PN coalition.)	▲1 (Note: PBS consisting of 1 MP left the GBS coalition and joins the PN-led government as confidence and supply. The GBS coalition is now defunct.)	–	–	–	–	108 (Note: 112 needed for a simple majority.) (Note: PH-led government collapses.); Mahathir VII → Muhyiddin
Start of the Muhyiddin government	92	9	42 (Note: BN joined the PN-led government as confidence and supply, which replaced the PH-led government.)	1	–	–	11 (Note: Mansor Othman, Syed Abu Hussin Hafiz, Saifuddin Abdullah, Azmin Ali, Zuraida Kamaruddin, Kamarudin Jaffar, Edmund Santhara, Mohd Rashid Hasnon, Jonathan Yasin, Willie Mongin, Ali Biju)	6 (Note: Mahathir Mohamad, Mukhriz Mahathir, Amiruddin Hamzah, Syed Saddiq Syed Abdul Rahman, Maszlee Malik, Baru Bian)	1	18	–	1	40	1	–	–	–	–	112 (Note: 112 needed for a simple majority.) (Note: PN–BN–GPS–PBS)
Seat changes Feb 2020 – Aug 2021	▼4 (Note: 4 MPs left PKR to become independents, aligning themselves with the PN-led government.)	▼1 (Note: Batu Sapi MP Liew Vui Keong died from pneumonia, vacating his seat.)	▼1 (Note: Gerik MP Hasbullah Osman died from a heart attack, vacating his seat.)	Steady	–	–	▼7 (Note: 10 independent MPs join PPBM.) (Note: 4 MPs left PKR to become independents that aligned with the PN-led government.)	▼4 (Note: 4 independent MPs form PEJUANG.) (Note: 1 independent MP joins PSB.) (Note: 1 MP left PEJUANG to become independent, aligned with PH.)	Steady	Steady	–	▲1 (Note: 1 independent MP joins PSB.)	▲10 (Note: 11 independent MPs join PPBM.) (Note: 1 MP left PPBM to join PEJUANG)	Steady	▲4 (Note: 4 independent MPs form PEJUANG.)	–	–	▲2 (Note: Batu Sapi MP Liew Vui Keong died from pneumonia, vacating his seat.) (Note: Gerik MP Hasbullah Osman died from a heart attack, vacating his seat.)	▲2
End of the Muhyiddin government	88	8	41	1	–	–	4 (Note: Xavier Jayakumar Arulanandam, Choong Shiau Yoon, Jugah Muyang, Larry Sng)	2 (Note: Syed Saddiq Syed Abdul Rahman, Maszlee Malik)	1	18	–	2	50	1	4	–	–	2	114 (Note: 111 needed for simple majority.) (Note: PN–BN–GPS–PBS)
Seat changes Aug 2021	Steady	Steady	▼14 (Note: 14 UMNO MPs withdrew support for PN, resulting in the collapse of the PN-led government.)	▲14 (Note: 14 UMNO MPs withdrew support for PN, resulting in the collapse of the PN-led government.)	–	–	Steady	Steady	Steady	Steady	–	Steady	Steady	Steady	Steady	–	–	Steady	100 (Note: 111 needed for a simple majority.) (Note: PN-led government collapses.); Muhyiddin → Ismail Sabri
Seat changes Aug 2021	Steady	Steady	▲14 (Note: The 14 UMNO MPs that withdrew support for the PN-led government are now part of the BN-led government.)	▼14 (Note: The 14 UMNO MPs that withdrew support for the PN-led government are now part of the BN-led government.)	–	–	Steady	Steady	Steady	Steady	–	Steady	Steady	Steady	Steady	–	–	Steady	100 Muhyiddin → Ismail Sabri
Start of the Ismail Sabri government	88	8	41	1	–	–	4 (Note: Xavier Jayakumar Arulanandam, Choong Shiau Yoon, Jugah Muyang, Larry Sng)	2 (Note: Syed Saddiq Syed Abdul Rahman, Maszlee Malik)	1	18	–	2	50	1	4	–	–	2	114 (Note: 111 needed for simple majority.) (Note: BN–PN–GPS–PBS)
Seat changes Aug 2021 – Oct 2022	▲2 (Note: UPKO consisting of 1 MP joins the PH coalition.) (Note: 1 independent MP joins PKR.)	▼1 (Note: 1 MP left WARISAN to become independent, aligned with the BN-led government.)	Steady	Steady	–	–	▼1 (Note: 1 MP left WARISAN to become independent, aligned with the BN-led government.) (Note: 2 independent MPs form PBM.) (Note: 1 independent MP joins PPBM.) (Note: 1 MP left PAS to become independent, aligned with the BN-led government.) (Note: 1 MP left PSB to become independent, aligned with the BN-led government.) (Note: 2 MPs left PPBM to become independent, aligned with the BN-led government.) (Note: 3 independent MPs join PBM.)	▼2 (Note: 1 independent MP joins PKR.) (Note: 1 independent MP forms MUDA.)	▼1 (Note: UPKO consisting of 1 MP joins the PH coalition.)	▲1 (Note: 1 MP left PPBM and joins PBB.)	–	▼1 (Note: 1 MP left PSB to become independent, aligned with the BN-led government.)	▼4 (Note: 1 independent MP joins PPBM.) (Note: 1 MP left PAS to become independent, aligned with the BN-led government.) (Note: 2 MPs left PPBM to become independent, aligned with the BN-led government.) (Note: 1 MP left PPBM to join PBM.) (Note: 1 MP left PPBM and joins PBB.)	Steady	Steady	▲6 (Note: 2 independent MPs form PBM.) (Note: 1 MP left PPBM to join PBM.) (Note: 3 independent MPs join PBM.)	▲1 (Note: 1 independent MP forms MUDA.)	Steady	▲2
Current Composition	90	7	41	1	–	–	3 (Note: Jugah Muyang, Khairuddin Aman Razali, Masir Kujat)		–	19	–	1	46	1	4	6	1	2	116 (Note: 111 needed for simple majority.) (Note: BN–PN–GPS–PBS–PBM)

== Seating arrangement ==
=== Latest seating arrangement ===
This is the seating arrangement as of its last meeting on 10 October 2022. The seating does not reflect current political allegiances. In addition, there were three seats that is labelled as VACANT, namely Batu Sapi, Gerik and Pekan. Both of Batu Sapi and Gerik seats vacancy is due to the death of the incumbent Member of Parliament (MP) for both of this constituency, which happened on 2 October 2020 (Batu Sapi) and 16 November 2020 (Gerik) respectively. While, the Pekan seat vacancy is due to the imprisonment of the incumbent Member of Parliament (MP) for the constituency, which effect on 23 August 2022.

Supposedly, according to election tradition, a by-election may be held as the parliamentary term at that time is not exceeding up to maximum three years (where its first meeting is in July 2018, with the latest it can held is in July 2021). However, due to the second series of Coronavirus pandemic that was seriously re-arose nationwide post-state election of Sabah and countless (tight) lockdowns at the same time since October 2020, the plan from Election Commission (SPR) to conduct the by-elections for Batu Sapi and Gerik constituency had been cancelled by taking account on this matter. In November 2020, the King or Yang Di-Pertuan Agong, Al-Sultan Abdullah had declared the Emergency Proclamation for both of the parliamentary constituencies, together with one state constituency in Sabah, namely Bugaya, located in Semporna parliamentary seats that was also vacant due to the death of its incumbent Sabah state Members of the Legislative Assembly (MLA). The proclamation was renounced by the King almost two years later.

P017 Padang Serai	P191 Kalabakan		P214 Selangau	Vacant	P166 Labuan	P175 Papar	P181 Tenom	Vacant	P204 Betong	P081 Jerantut	P184 Libaran	P188 Lahad Datu	P019 Tumpat	P069 Parit	P127 Jempol		P220 Baram	P202 Sri Aman
P208 Sarikei	P173 Putatan	P169 Kota Belud		P060 Taiping	Vacant	P130 Rasah	Vacant	Vacant	P092 Sabak Bernam	P216 Hulu Rajang	P054 Gerik (Vacant)	Vacant	P167 Kudat	P177 Beaufort		P197 Kota Samarahan	P158 Tebrau	P203 Lubok Antu
	P105 Petaling Jaya																P206 Tanjong Manis
	Vacant	Vacant	Vacant	P136 Tangga Batu	Vacant	P141 Sekijang	P186 Sandakan	Vacant	P031 Kuala Krai	P039 Dungun	P022 Pasir Mas	P016 Baling	P029 Machang	P201 Batang Lupar	P061 Padang Rengas	P112 Kuala Langat	Vacant
	P089 Bentong	P053 Balik Pulau														P091 Rompin	Vacant
P088 Temerloh	P133 Tampin	Vacant	Vacant		Vacant	P195 Bandar Kuching	P152 Kluang	Vacant	P164 Pontian	P073 Pasir Salak	P033 Besut	P187 Kinabatangan	P217 Bintulu		(Senator)	Vacant	P059 Bukit Gantang	Vacant
P142 Labis	P002 Kangar	P096 Kuala Selangor	P138 Kota Melaka												(Senator)	P180 Keningau	Vacant	Vacant
P115 Batu	Vacant	Vacant	Vacant	P046 Batu Kawan		P050 Jelutong	P062 Sungai Siput	Vacant	P035 Kuala Nerus	P025 Bachok	P055 Lenggong	P125 Putrajaya		P165 Tanjung Piai	(Senator)	P209 Julau	Vacant	Vacant
Vacant	P212 Sibu	P117 Segambut	P074 Lumut	P144 Ledang										Vacant	Vacant	P207 Igan	P078 Cameron Highlands	P042 Tasek Gelugor
P192 Mas Gading		Vacant	Vacant	P101 Hulu Langat										P036 Kuala Terengganu	Vacant	Vacant		Vacant
		P052 Bayan Baru	Vacant	P051 Bukit Gelugor	Vacant		Vacant	P135 Alor Gajah	P199 Serian	Vacant	P157 Pengerang		P210 Kanowit	P011 Pendang	P028 Pasir Puteh	P218 Sibuti
	P159 Pasir Gudang	Vacant	Vacant	P009 Alor Setar	P149 Sri Gading		P143 Pagoh	P037 Marang	P085 Pekan (Vacant)	P075 Bagan Datuk			P222 Lawas	P020 Pengkalan Chepa	P178 Sipitang	Vacant	Vacant
	P048 Bukit Bendera	P110 Klang	P064 Ipoh Timor	P045 Bukit Mertajam	P006 Kubang Pasu	P032 Gua Musang	E		D		C	P140 Segamat	P198 Puncak Borneo	P182 Pensiangan	P176 Kimanis	P034 Setiu	P013 Sik
	P094 Hulu Selangor	Vacant	Vacant	P010 Kuala Kedah	Vacant	P005 Jerlun	E		Sergeant-at-Arm		C	P179 Ranau	P205 Saratok	P221 Limbang	P126 Jelebu	Vacant	Vacant
	P172 Kota Kinabalu	P190 Tawau	P118 Setiawangsa	P070 Kampar	P151 Simpang Renggam	P004 Langkawi	E				C	P038 Hulu Terengganu	P047 Nibong Tebal	P215 Mukah	P023 Rantau Panjang	P040 Kemaman	P012 Jerai
		P145 Bakri	P211 Lanang	P123 Cheras	P071 Gopeng	P049 Tanjong	F		the Mace		B	P168 Kota Marudu	P119 Titiwangsa	P156 Kota Tinggi	P067 Kuala Kangsar	P134 Masjid Tanah
		P104 Subang	P107 Sungai Buloh	P097 Selayang	P122 Seputeh	P044 Permatang Pauh	F		the Mace		B	P072 Tapah	P147 Parit Sulong	P099 Ampang	P087 Kuala Krau	P058 Bagan Serai
	P114 Kepong	P102 Bangi	P185 Batu Sapi (Vacant)	P174 Penampang	P116 Wangsa Maju	P100 Pandan	F		the Mace		B	P148 Ayer Hitam	P041 Kepala Batas	P007 Padang Terap	P086 Maran	P093 Sungai Besar	(Senator)
	P014 Merbok	P109 Kapar	P008 Pokok Sena	P057 Parit Buntar	P065 Ipoh Barat	P076 Teluk Intan	F		the Mace		B	(Senator)	P026 Ketereh	P154 Mersing	P079 Lipis	P124 Bandar Tun Razak	(Senator)
	P066 Batu Gajah	P121 Lembah Pantai	P080 Raub	P160 Johor Bahru	P120 Bukit Bintang	P043 Bagan	G				A	P194 Petra Jaya	P215 Kapit	P082 Indera Mahkota	(Senator)	P129 Kuala Pilah	Vacant
	P170 Tuaran	P068 Beruas	P219 Miri	P196 Stampin	P146 Muar	P189 Semporna	G				A	(Senator)	P056 Larut	P030 Jeli	P063 Tambun	P001 Padang Besar	Vacant (Deputy Speaker)
	P113 Sepang	P137 Hang Tuah Jaya	P106 Damansara	P162 Iskandar Puteri	P103 Puchong	P128 Seremban	G				A	P153 Sembrong	P024 Kubang Kerian	P155 Tenggara	P003 Arau	P139 Jasin	P150 Batu Pahat (Deputy Speaker)
		P163 Kulai	P108 Shah Alam	P077 Tanjong Malim	P161 Pulai	P111 Kota Raja	G				A	P098 Gombak	P183 Beluran	P131 Rembau	P095 Tanjong Karang	P084 Paya Besar
		P171 Sepanggar	P083 Kuantan	P015 Sungai Petani	P018 Kulim-Bandar Baharu	P132 Port Dickson (Opposition Leader)	G		Secretary		A	P090 Bera (Prime Minister)	P193 Santubong	P021 Kota Bharu	P200 Batang Sadong	P027 Tanah Merah
									Speaker
									Yang Di-Pertuan Agong

- The seating arrangement is viewable at the official website of the Parliament.

=== Previous seating arrangement ===
Seating arrangement until its last second term meeting on 5 December 2019.

Vacant	Vacant		Vacant	Vacant	Vacant	Vacant	Vacant	P059 Bukit Gantang	Vacant	Vacant	Vacant	Vacant	Vacant	Vacant	Vacant		P183 Beluran	P167 Kudat
Vacant	P218 Sibuti	P182 Pensiangan		Vacant	Vacant	Vacant	Vacant	Vacant	Vacant	Vacant	Vacant	Vacant	Vacant	Vacant		P027 Tanah Merah	P042 Tasek Gelugor	P177 Beaufort
	P206 Tanjong Manis																P154 Mersing
	P207 Igan	P221 Limbang	P180 Keningau	P186 Sandakan	P192 Mas Gading	P138 Kota Melaka	P219 Miri	P208 Sarikei	P212 Sibu	P093 Sungai Besar	P144 Ledang	P118 Setiawangsa	P190 Tawau	P105 Petaling Jaya	P203 Lubok Antu	P198 Puncak Borneo	P056 Larut
	P204 Betong	P220 Baram														P179 Ranau	P134 Masjid Tanah
Vacant	P216 Hulu Rajang	P210 Kanowit	P201 Batang Lupar		P046 Batu Kawan	P110 Klang	P051 Bukit Gelugor	P114 Kepong	P070 Kampar	P104 Subang	P047 Nibong Tebal	P010 Kuala Kedah	P116 Wangsa Maju		P141 Sekijang	P173 Putatan	P058 Bagan Serai	Vacant
Vacant	Vacant	P222 Lawas	P200 Batang Sadong												P136 Tangga Batu	P159 Pasir Gudang	P115 Batu	P178 Sipitang
Vacant	Vacant	P215 Kapit	P197 Kota Samarahan	P217 Bintulu		P211 Lanang	P106 Damansara	P066 Batu Gajah	P068 Beruas	P120 Bukit Bintang	P097 Selayang	P044 Permatang Pauh		P094 Hulu Selangor	P017 Padang Serai	P158 Tebrau	P209 Julau	P184 Libaran
Vacant	P202 Sri Aman	Vacant	P213 Mukah	P168 Kota Marudu										P014 Merbok	P002 Kangar	P121 Lembah Pantai	P175 Papar	P038 Hulu Terengganu
Vacant		Vacant	Vacant	P199 Serian										P077 Tanjong Malim	P009 Alor Setar	P048 Bukit Bendera		P092 Sabak Bernam
		P040 Kemaman	Vacant	Vacant	P170 Tuaran		P005 Jerlun	P063 Tambun	P123 Cheras	P015 Sungai Petani	P109 Kapar		P169 Kota Belud	P062 Sungai Siput	P160 Johor Bahru	P181 Tenom
	Vacant	P036 Kuala Terengganu	P011 Pendang	P028 Pasir Puteh	P193 Santubong		P049 Tanjong	P189 Semporna	P132 Port Dickson	P162 Iskandar Puteri			Vacant	P191 Kalabakan	P195 Bandar Kuching	P050 Jelutong	P166 Labuan
	Vacant	P034 Setiu	P031 Kuala Krai	P020 Pengkalan Chepa	P025 Bachok	P194 Petra Jaya	E		D		C	P074 Lumut	P124 Bandar Tun Razak	P133 Tampin	P140 Segamat	P130 Rasah	P172 Kota Kinabalu
	Vacant	P013 Sik	P019 Tumpat	P039 Dungun	P035 Kuala Nerus	P024 Kubang Kerian	E		Sergeant-at-Arm		C	P088 Temerloh	P102 Bangi	P101 Hulu Langat	P089 Bentong	P060 Taiping	P142 Labis
	Vacant	P012 Jerai	P022 Pasir Mas	P023 Rantau Panjang	P021 Kota Bharu	P037 Marang	E				C	P008 Pokok Sena	P113 Sepang	P064 Ipoh Timur	P205 Saratok	P152 Kluang	P030 Jeli
		Vacant	P067 Kuala Kangsar	P156 Kota Tinggi	P125 Putrajaya	P032 Gua Musang	F		the Mace		B	P119 Titiwangsa	P018 Kulim-Bandar Baharu	P188 Lahad Datu (Silam)	P071 Gopeng	P045 Bukit Mertajam
		Vacant	P127 Jempol	P086 Maran	P029 Machang	P153 Sembrong	F		the Mace		B	P099 Ampang	P112 Kuala Langat	P185 Batu Sapi	P107 Sungai Buloh	P163 Kulai
	Vacant	Vacant	P001 Padang Besar	P139 Jasin	P073 Pasir Salak	P026 Ketereh	F		the Mace		B	P098 Gombak	P135 Alor Gajah	P108 Shah Alam	P052 Bayan Baru	P117 Segambut	P171 Sepanggar
	Vacant	P176 Kimanis	P069 Parit	P091 Rompin	P041 Kepala Batas	P007 Padang Terap	F		the Mace		B	P151 Simpang Renggam	P146 Muar	P057 Parit Buntar	P137 Hang Tuah Jaya	P080 Raub	(Senator)
	Vacant	P165 Tanjung Piai	P126 Jelebu	P187 Kinabatangan	P095 Tanjung Karang	P072 Tapah	G				A	P111 Kota Raja	P096 Kuala Selangor	P082 Indera Mahkota	P129 Kuala Pilah	P196 Stampin	(Senator)
	Vacant	P078 Cameron Highlands	P081 Jerantut	P164 Pontian	P131 Rembau	P148 Ayer Hitam	G				A	P043 Bagan	P161 Pulai	P214 Selangau	P006 Kubang Pasu	P053 Balik Pulau	(Senator)
	Vacant	P084 Paya Besar	P054 Gerik	P087 Kuala Krau	P033 Besut	P075 Bagan Datuk	G				A	P143 Pagoh	P065 Ipoh Barat	P145 Bakri	Vacant	P083 Kuantan	(Senator)
		P155 Tenggara	P016 Baling	P055 Lenggong	P003 Arau	P085 Pekan	G				A	P100 Pandan (Deputy Prime Minister)	P103 Puchong	P122 Seputeh	P149 Sri Gading	P076 Teluk Intan (Deputy Speaker)
		P061 Padang Rengas	P079 Lipis	P147 Parit Sulong	P157 Pengerang	P090 Bera (Opposition Leader)	G		Secretary		A	P004 Langkawi (Prime Minister)	P128 Seremban	P174 Penampang	(Senator)	P150 Batu Pahat (Deputy Speaker)
									Speaker
									Yang Di-Pertuan Agong

== Elected members by state ==
Shortcut:

Perlis | Kedah | Kelantan | Terengganu | Pulau Pinang | Perak | Pahang | Selangor | Kuala Lumpur | Putrajaya | Negeri Sembilan | Melaka | Johor | Labuan | Sabah | Sarawak

=== Perlis ===
No.	Federal Constituency	Member	Coalition (party)
BN 2 | PH 1
P001	Padang Besar	Zahidi Zainul Abidin	BN (UMNO)
P002	Kangar	Noor Amin Ahmad	PH (PKR)
P003	Arau	Shahidan Kassim	BN (UMNO)

=== Kedah ===
No.	Federal Constituency	Member	Coalition (party)
PH 7 | PN 3 | GTA 3 | BN 2
P004	Langkawi	Mahathir Mohamad (Note: Mahathir Mohamad contested the general election as a candidate of Pakatan Harapan (PPBM), was sacked from the party on 28 May 2020 and thus became an independent. He later joined newly formed party PEJUANG in August 2020.)	GTA (PEJUANG)
P005	Jerlun	Mukhriz Mahathir (Note: Mukhriz Mahathir contested the general election as a candidate of Pakatan Harapan (PPBM), was sacked from the party on 28 May 2020 and thus became an independent. He later joined newly formed party PEJUANG in August 2020.)	GTA (PEJUANG)
P006	Kubang Pasu	Amiruddin Hamzah (Note: Amiruddin Hamzah contested the general election as a candidate of Pakatan Harapan (PPBM), was sacked from the party on 28 May 2020 and thus became an independent. He later joined newly formed party PEJUANG in August 2020.)	GTA (PEJUANG)
P007	Padang Terap	Mahdzir Khalid	BN (UMNO)
P008	Pokok Sena	Mahfuz Omar	PH (AMANAH)
P009	Alor Setar	Chan Ming Kai	PH (PKR)
P010	Kuala Kedah	Azman Ismail	PH (PKR)
P011	Pendang	Awang Hashim	PN (PAS)
P012	Jerai	Sabri Azit	PN (PAS)
P013	Sik	Ahmad Tarmizi Sulaiman	PN (PAS)
P014	Merbok	Nor Azrina Surip	PH (PKR)
P015	Sungai Petani	Johari Abdul	PH (PKR)
P016	Baling	Abdul Azeez Abdul Rahim	BN (UMNO)
P017	Padang Serai	Karupaiya Mutusami	PH (PKR)
P018	Kulim-Bandar Baharu	Saifuddin Nasution Ismail	PH (PKR)

=== Kelantan ===
No.	Federal Constituency	Member	Coalition (party)
PN 11 | BN 3
P019	Tumpat	Che Abdullah Mat Nawi	PN (PAS)
P020	Pengkalan Chepa	Ahmad Marzuk Shaary	PN (PAS)
P021	Kota Bharu	Takiyuddin Hassan	PN (PAS)
P022	Pasir Mas	Ahmad Fadhli Shaari	PN (PAS)
P023	Rantau Panjang	Siti Zailah Mohd Yusoff	PN (PAS)
P024	Kubang Kerian	Tuan Ibrahim Tuan Man	PN (PAS)
P025	Bachok	Nik Mohamed Abduh Nik Abdul Aziz	PN (PAS)
P026	Ketereh	Annuar Musa	BN (UMNO)
P027	Tanah Merah	Ikmal Hisham Abdul Aziz (Note: Ikmal Hisham Abdul Aziz contested the general election as a candidate of Barisan Nasional (UMNO), after which he left the party on 14 December 2018 and became an independent, later joined Pakatan Harapan (BERSATU) on 12 February 2019.)	PN (BERSATU)
P028	Pasir Puteh	Nik Muhammad Zawawi Salleh	PN (PAS)
P029	Machang	Ahmad Jazlan Yaakub	BN (UMNO)
P030	Jeli	Mustapa Mohamed (Note: Mustapa Mohamed contested the general election as a candidate of Barisan Nasional (UMNO), after which he left the party on 18 September 2018 and became an independent, later joined Pakatan Harapan (BERSATU) on 26 October 2018.)	PN (BERSATU)
P031	Kuala Krai	Ab Latiff Ab Rahman	PN (PAS)
P032	Gua Musang	Tengku Razaleigh Hamzah	BN (UMNO)

=== Terengganu ===
No.	Federal Constituency	Member	Coalition (party)
PN 6 | BN 1 | IND 1
P033	Besut	Idris Jusoh	BN (UMNO)
P034	Setiu	Shaharizukirnain Abd. Kadir	PN (PAS)
P035	Kuala Nerus	Mohd Khairuddin Aman Razali	IND
P036	Kuala Terengganu	Ahmad Amzad Mohamed @ Hashim	PN (PAS)
P037	Marang	Abdul Hadi Awang	PN (PAS)
P038	Hulu Terengganu	Rosol Wahid (Note: Rosol Wahid contested the general election as a candidate of Barisan Nasional (UMNO), after which he left the party on 14 December 2018 and became an independent, later joined Pakatan Harapan (BERSATU) on 12 February 2019.)	PN (BERSATU)
P039	Dungun	Wan Hassan Mohd Ramli	PN (PAS)
P040	Kemaman	Che Alias Hamid	PN (PAS)

=== Penang ===
No.	Federal Constituency	Member	Coalition (party)
PH 10 | PN 2 | BN 1
P041	Kepala Batas	Reezal Merican Naina Merican	BN (UMNO)
P042	Tasek Gelugor	Shabudin Yahaya (Note: Shabudin Yahaya contested the general election as a candidate of Barisan Nasional (UMNO), after which he left the party on 14 December 2018 and became an independent, later joined Pakatan Harapan (BERSATU) on 12 February 2019.)	PN (BERSATU)
P043	Bagan	Lim Guan Eng	PH (DAP)
P044	Permatang Pauh	Nurul Izzah Anwar	PH (PKR)
P045	Bukit Mertajam	Steven Sim Chee Keong	PH (DAP)
P046	Batu Kawan	Kasthuriraani Patto	PH (DAP)
P047	Nibong Tebal	Mansor Othman (Note: Mansor Othman contested the general election as a candidate of Pakatan Harapan (PKR), after which he resign from the party on 24 February 2020 and became an independent. He later joined BERSATU on 22 August 2020.)	PN (BERSATU)
P048	Bukit Bendera	Wong Hon Wai	PH (DAP)
P049	Tanjong	Chow Kon Yeow	PH (DAP)
P050	Jelutong	Sanisvara Nethaji Rayer Rajaji Rayer	PH (DAP)
P051	Bukit Gelugor	Ramkarpal Singh	PH (DAP)
P052	Bayan Baru	Sim Tze Tzin	PH (PKR)
P053	Balik Pulau	Muhammad Bakhtiar Wan Chik	PH (PKR)

=== Perak ===
No.	Federal Constituency	Member	Coalition (party)
PH 12 | BN 7 | PN 4 | VAC 1
P054	Gerik	Vacant since 16 November 2020	VAC
P054	Gerik	Hasbullah Osman until 16 November 2020	BN (UMNO)
P055	Lenggong	Shamsul Anuar Nasarah	BN (UMNO)
P056	Larut	Hamzah Zainudin (Note: Hamzah Zainudin contested the general election as a candidate of Barisan Nasional (UMNO), after which he left the party on 14 December 2018 and became an independent, later joined Pakatan Harapan (PPBM) on 12 February 2019.)	PN (BERSATU)
P057	Parit Buntar	Mujahid Yusof Rawa	PH (AMANAH)
P058	Bagan Serai	Noor Azmi Ghazali (Note: Noor Azmi Ghazali contested the general election as a candidate of Barisan Nasional (UMNO), after which he left the party on 24 June 2018 and became an independent, later joined Pakatan Harapan (PPBM) on 28 November 2018.)	PN (BERSATU)
P059	Bukit Gantang	Syed Abu Hussin Hafiz Syed Abdul Fasal (Note: Syed Abu Hussin Hafiz Syed Abdul Fasal contested the general election as a candidate of Barisan Nasional (UMNO), after which he left the party on 24 June 2018 and became an independent.)	PN (BERSATU)
P060	Taiping	Teh Kok Lim	PH (DAP)
P061	Padang Rengas	Mohamed Nazri Abdul Aziz	BN (UMNO)
P062	Sungai Siput	Kesavan Subramaniam	PH (PKR)
P063	Tambun	Ahmad Faizal Azumu	PN (BERSATU)
P064	Ipoh Timor	Wong Kah Woh	PH (DAP)
P065	Ipoh Barat	M. Kulasegaran	PH (DAP)
P066	Batu Gajah	Sivakumar Varatharaju Naidu	PH (DAP)
P067	Kuala Kangsar	Mastura Mohd Yazid	BN (UMNO)
P068	Beruas	Ngeh Koo Ham	PH (DAP)
P069	Parit	Mohd Nizar Zakaria	BN (UMNO)
P070	Kampar	Thomas Su Keong Siong	PH (DAP)
P071	Gopeng	Lee Boon Chye	PH (PKR)
P072	Tapah	Saravanan Murugan	BN (MIC)
P073	Pasir Salak	Tajuddin Abdul Rahman	BN (UMNO)
P074	Lumut	Mohd Hatta Md Ramli	PH (AMANAH)
P075	Bagan Datuk	Ahmad Zahid Hamidi	BN (UMNO)
P076	Teluk Intan	Nga Kor Ming	PH (DAP)
P077	Tanjong Malim	Chang Lih Kang	PH (PKR)

=== Pahang ===
No.	Federal Constituency	Member	Coalition (party)
BN 8 | PH 4 | PN 1 | VAC 1
P078	Cameron Highlands	Ramli Mohd Nor since 26 January 2019 (Note: Ramli Mohd. Noor contested the by-election as a direct Barisan Nasional candidate, after the disqualification of the previous MP, Sivarraajh Chandran, who is also from Barisan Nasional (MIC), due to election offences during the 2018 general election.)	BN (UMNO)
P078	Cameron Highlands	Sivarraajh Chandran until 30 November 2018	BN (MIC)
P079	Lipis	Abdul Rahman Mohamad	BN (UMNO)
P080	Raub	Tengku Zulpuri Shah Raja Puji	PH (DAP)
P081	Jerantut	Ahmad Nazlan Idris	BN (UMNO)
P082	Indera Mahkota	Saifuddin Abdullah (Note: Saifuddin Abdullah contested the general election as a candidate of Pakatan Harapan (PKR), after which he resign from the party on 24 February 2020 and became an independent. He later joined BERSATU on 22 August 2020.)	PN (BERSATU)
P083	Kuantan	Fuziah Salleh	PH (PKR)
P084	Paya Besar	Mohd. Shahar Abdullah	BN (UMNO)
P085	Pekan	Vacant since 23 August 2022	VAC
P085	Pekan	Najib Razak until 23 August 2022	BN (UMNO)
P086	Maran	Ismail Abdul Muttalib	BN (UMNO)
P087	Kuala Krau	Ismail Mohamed Said	BN (UMNO)
P088	Temerloh	Mohd Anuar Mohd Tahir	PH (AMANAH)
P089	Bentong	Wong Tack	PH (DAP)
P090	Bera	Ismail Sabri Yaakob	BN (UMNO)
P091	Rompin	Hasan Arifin	BN (UMNO)

=== Selangor ===
No.	Federal Constituency	Member	Coalition (party)
PH 17 | PN 3 | PBM 2 | BN 1
P092	Sabak Bernam	Mohamad Fasiah Mohd Fakeh (Note: Mohamad Fasiah Mohd. Fakeh contested the general election as a candidate of Barisan Nasional (UMNO), after which he left the party on 14 December 2018 and became an independent, later joined Pakatan Harapan (PPBM) on 12 February 2019.)	PN (BERSATU)
P093	Sungai Besar	Muslimin Yahaya	PN (BERSATU)
P094	Hulu Selangor	June Leow Hsiad Hui	PH (PKR)
P095	Tanjong Karang	Noh Omar	BN (UMNO)
P096	Kuala Selangor	Dzulkefly Ahmad	PH (AMANAH)
P097	Selayang	William Leong Jee Keen	PH (PKR)
P098	Gombak	Mohamed Azmin Ali (Note: Mohamed Azmin contested the general election as a candidate of Pakatan Harapan (PKR), after which he was sacked by the party on 24 February 2020 and became an independent. He later joined BERSATU on 22 August 2020.)	PN (BERSATU)
P099	Ampang	Zuraida Kamaruddin (Note: Zuraida Kamaruddin contested the general election as a candidate of Pakatan Harapan (PKR), after which she was sacked by the party on 24 February 2020 and became an independent. She later joined BERSATU on 22 August 2020.)	PBM
P100	Pandan	Wan Azizah Wan Ismail	PH (PKR)
P101	Hulu Langat	Hasanuddin Mohd Yunus	PH (AMANAH)
P102	Bangi	Ong Kian Ming	PH (DAP)
P103	Puchong	Gobind Singh Deo	PH (DAP)
P104	Subang	Wong Chen	PH (PKR)
P105	Petaling Jaya	Maria Chin Abdullah	PH (PKR)
P106	Damansara	Tony Pua Kiam Wee	PH (DAP)
P107	Sungai Buloh	Sivarasa Rasiah	PH (PKR)
P108	Shah Alam	Khalid Abdul Samad	PH (AMANAH)
P109	Kapar	Abdullah Sani Abdul Hamid	PH (PKR)
P110	Klang	Charles Anthony Santiago	PH (DAP)
P111	Kota Raja	Mohamad Sabu	PH (AMANAH)
P112	Kuala Langat	Xavier Jayakumar Arulanandam (Note: Xavier Jayakumar Arulanandam contested the general election as a candidate of Pakatan Harapan (PKR), after which he left the party on 13 March 2021 and became an independent.)	PBM
P113	Sepang	Mohamed Hanipa Maidin	PH (AMANAH)

=== Federal Territory of Kuala Lumpur ===
No.	Federal Constituency	Member	Coalition (party)
PH 9 | PN 2
P114	Kepong	Lim Lip Eng	PH (DAP)
P115	Batu	Prabakaran Parameswaran (Note: Prabakaran Parameswaran contested the general election as an independent candidate, after which he joined Pakatan Harapan (PKR) on 13 May 2018.)	PH (PKR)
P116	Wangsa Maju	Tan Yee Kew	PH (PKR)
P117	Segambut	Hannah Yeoh Tseow Suan	PH (DAP)
P118	Setiawangsa	Nik Nazmi Nik Ahmad	PH (PKR)
P119	Titiwangsa	Rina Mohd Harun	PN (BERSATU)
P120	Bukit Bintang	Fong Kui Lun	PH (DAP)
P121	Lembah Pantai	Ahmad Fahmi Mohamed Fadzil	PH (PKR)
P122	Seputeh	Teresa Kok Suh Sim	PH (DAP)
P123	Cheras	Tan Kok Wai	PH (DAP)
P124	Bandar Tun Razak	Kamarudin Jaffar (Note: Kamaruddin Jaffar contested the general election as a candidate of Pakatan Harapan (PKR), after which he resign from the party on 24 February 2020 and became an independent. He later joined back BERSATU on 22 August 2020.)	PN (BERSATU)

=== Federal Territory of Putrajaya ===
No.	Federal Constituency	Member	Coalition (party)
BN 1
P125	Putrajaya	Tengku Adnan Tengku Mansor	BN (UMNO)

=== Negeri Sembilan ===
No.	Federal Constituency	Member	Coalition (party)
PH 4 | BN 3 | PN 1
P126	Jelebu	Jalaluddin Alias	BN (UMNO)
P127	Jempol	Mohd Salim Mohd Shariff	BN (UMNO)
P128	Seremban	Anthony Loke Siew Fook	PH (DAP)
P129	Kuala Pilah	Eddin Syazlee Shith	PN (BERSATU)
P130	Rasah	Cha Kee Chin	PH (DAP)
P131	Rembau	Khairy Jamaluddin	BN (UMNO)
P132	Port Dickson	Anwar Ibrahim since 13 October 2018 (Note: Anwar Ibrahim contested the by-election as a Pakatan Harapan (PKR) candidate and won the seat on 13 October 2018, replacing the incumbent MP Danyal Balagopal Abdullah, who was also from Pakatan Harapan (PKR), who vacated his seat on 12 September 2018.)	PH (PKR)
P132	Port Dickson	Danyal Balagopal Abdullah until 12 September 2018	PH (PKR)
P133	Tampin	Hasan Bahrom	PH (AMANAH)

=== Malacca ===
No.	Federal Constituency	Member	Coalition (party)
PH 3 | PN 2 | BN 1
P134	Masjid Tanah	Mas Ermieyati Samsudin (Note: Mas Ermieyati Samsudin contested the general election as a candidate of Barisan Nasional (UMNO), after which she left the party on 1 July 2018 and became an independent, later joined Pakatan Harapan (BERSATU) on 13 December 2018.)	PN (BERSATU)
P135	Alor Gajah	Mohd Redzuan Md Yusof	PN (BERSATU)
P136	Tangga Batu	Rusnah Aluai	PH (PKR)
P137	Hang Tuah Jaya	Shamsul Iskandar @ Yusre Mohd Akin	PH (PKR)
P138	Kota Melaka	Khoo Poay Tiong	PH (DAP)
P139	Jasin	Ahmad Hamzah	BN (UMNO)

=== Johor ===
No.	Federal Constituency	Member	Coalition (party)
PH 11 | BN 8 | PN 3 | PBM 2 | PEJUANG 1 | MUDA 1
P140	Segamat	Edmund Santhara Kumar Ramanaidu (Note: Santhara Kumar Ramanaidu contested the general election as a candidate of Pakatan Harapan (PKR), after which he resigned from the party on 24 February 2020 and became an independent. He later joined Bersatu on 22 August 2020.)	PBM
P141	Sekijang	Natrah Ismail	PH (PKR)
P142	Labis	Pang Hok Liong	PH (DAP)
P143	Pagoh	Muhyiddin Yassin	PN (BERSATU)
P144	Ledang	Syed Ibrahim Syed Noh	PH (PKR)
P145	Bakri	Yeo Bee Yin	PH (DAP)
P146	Muar	Syed Saddiq Syed Abdul Rahman (Note: Syed Saddiq contested the general election as a candidate of Pakatan Harapan (PPBM), was sacked from the party on 28 May 2020 and thus became an independent.)	MUDA
P147	Parit Sulong	Noraini Ahmad	BN (UMNO)
P148	Ayer Hitam	Wee Ka Siong	BN (MCA)
P149	Sri Gading	Shahruddin Md Salleh (Note: Shahruddin Md Salleh contested the general election as a candidate of Pakatan Harapan (PPBM), had his party membership terminated on 20 June 2020 and thus became an independent. He later joined newly formed party PEJUANG in August, 2020.)	GTA (PEJUANG)
P150	Batu Pahat	Mohd Rashid Hasnon (Note: Mohd Rashid Hasnon contested the general election as a candidate of Pakatan Harapan (PKR), after which he resign from the party on 24 February 2020 and became an independent. He later joined BERSATU on 22 August 2020.)	PN (BERSATU)
P151	Simpang Renggam	Maszlee Malik (Note: Maszlee Malik contested the general election as a candidate of Pakatan Harapan (PPBM), was sacked from the party on 28 May 2020 and thus became an independent. He joined newly formed party PEJUANG in August, 2020. However, on 2 November 2020, he resigned from the party, once again being an independent. He later joined Pakatan Harapan (PKR) on 27 November 2021.)	PH (PKR)
P152	Kluang	Wong Shu Qi	PH (DAP)
P153	Sembrong	Hishammuddin Hussein	BN (UMNO)
P154	Mersing	Abdul Latiff Ahmad (Note: Abd. Latiff Ahmad contested the general election as a candidate of Barisan Nasional (UMNO), after which he left the party on 14 December 2018 and became an independent, later joined Pakatan Harapan (PPBM) on 12 February 2019.)	PN (BERSATU)
P155	Tenggara	Adham Baba	BN (UMNO)
P156	Kota Tinggi	Halimah Mohamed Sadique	BN (UMNO)
P157	Pengerang	Azalina Othman Said	BN (UMNO)
P158	Tebrau	Steven Choong Shiau Yoon	PBM
P159	Pasir Gudang	Hassan Abdul Karim	PH (PKR)
P160	Johor Bahru	Akmal Nasrullah Mohd Nasir	PH (PKR)
P161	Pulai	Salahuddin Ayub	PH (AMANAH)
P162	Iskandar Puteri	Lim Kit Siang	PH (DAP)
P163	Kulai	Teo Nie Ching	PH (DAP)
P164	Pontian	Ahmad Maslan	BN (UMNO)
P165	Tanjung Piai	Wee Jeck Seng since 16 November 2019 (Note: Wee Jeck Seng contested and won the by-election as a candidate of Barisan Nasional (MCA), replacing the previous MP Md. Farid Md. Rafik, from Pakatan Harapan (BERSATU), following the death of incumbent who died of heart complications on 21 September 2019.)	BN (MCA)
P165	Tanjung Piai	Md Farid Md Rafik until 21 September 2019	PH (BERSATU)

=== Federal Territory of Labuan ===
No.	Federal Constituency	Member	Coalition (party)
WARISAN 1
P166	Labuan	Rozman Isli (Note: Rozman Isli contested the general election as a candidate of Barisan Nasional (UMNO), after which he left the party on 11 October 2018 and joined the Sabah Heritage Party.)	WARISAN

=== Sabah ===
No.	Federal Constituency	Member	Coalition (party)
GRS 8 | WARISAN 6 | PH 6 | BN 3 | PBM 1 | VAC 1
P167	Kudat	Abdul Rahim Bakri (Note: Abd Rahim Bakri contested the general election as a candidate of Barisan Nasional (UMNO), after which he left the party on 12 December 2018 and became an independent, later joined Pakatan Harapan (PPBM) on 14 March 2019.)	GRS (BERSATU Sabah)
P168	Kota Marudu	Maximus Ongkili (Note: Maximus Johnity Ongkili contested the general election as a Barisan Nasional candidate, after which his party PBS officially left Barisan Nasional on 12 May 2018.)	GRS (PBS)
P169	Kota Belud	Isnaraissah Munirah Majilis @ Fakharudy	WARISAN
P170	Tuaran	Wilfred Madius Tangau (Note: Wilfred Madius Tangau contested the general election as a Barisan Nasional candidate, after which his party UPKO officially left Barisan Nasional on 10 May 2018.)	PH (UPKO)
P171	Sepanggar	Azis Jamman	WARISAN
P172	Kota Kinabalu	Chan Foong Hin	PH (DAP)
P173	Putatan	Awang Husaini Sahari	PH (PKR)
P174	Penampang	Ignatius Darell Leiking	WARISAN
P175	Papar	Ahmad Hassan	WARISAN
P176	Kimanis	Mohamad Alamin since 18 January 2020 (Note: Mohamad Alamin contested the by-election as a candidate of Barisan Nasional (UMNO). The by-election was called for after the election of the previous candidate Anifah Aman was declared null and void by an election court on 16 August 2019, pending an appeal. The Federal Court dismissed Anifah Aman's appeal on 2 December 2019.)	BN (UMNO)
P176	Kimanis	Anifah Aman until 2 December 2019	IND
P177	Beaufort	Azizah Mohd Dun (Note: Azizah Mohd. Dun contested the general election as a candidate of Barisan Nasional (UMNO), after which she left the party on 12 December 2018 and became an independent, later joined Pakatan Harapan (PPBM) on 14 March 2019.)	GRS (BERSATU Sabah)
P178	Sipitang	Yamani Hafez Musa (Note: Yamani Hafez Musa contested the general election as a candidate of Barisan Nasional (UMNO), after which he left the party on 12 December 2018 to become an independent, and later joined Pakatan Harapan (PPBM) on 17 September 2019.)	GRS (BERSATU Sabah)
P179	Ranau	Jonathan Yasin (Note: Jonathan Yasin contested the general election as a candidate of Pakatan Harapan (PKR), after which he resigned from the party on 24 February 2020 and became an independent. He later joined BERSATU on 22 August 2020.)	GRS (BERSATU Sabah)
P180	Keningau	Jeffrey Kitingan	GRS (STAR)
P181	Tenom	Noorita Sual	PH (DAP)
P182	Pensiangan	Arthur Joseph Kurup (Note: Arthur Joseph Kurup contested the general election as a Barisan Nasional candidate, after which his party PBRS officially left Barisan Nasional on 11 May 2018.)	BN (PBRS)
P183	Beluran	Ronald Kiandee (Note: Ronald Kiandee contested the general election as a candidate of Barisan Nasional (UMNO), after which he left the party on 12 December 2018 and became an independent, later joined Pakatan Harapan (PPBM) on 14 March 2019.)	GRS (BERSATU Sabah)
P184	Libaran	Zakaria Edris (Note: Zakaria Mohd. Edris contested the general election as a candidate of Barisan Nasional (UMNO), after which he left the party on 12 December 2018 and became an independent, later joined Pakatan Harapan (PPBM) on 14 March 2019.)	GRS (BERSATU Sabah)
P185	Batu Sapi	Vacant since 2 October 2020	VAC
P185	Batu Sapi	Liew Vui Keong until 2 October 2020	WARISAN
P186	Sandakan	Vivian Wong Shir Yee since 11 May 2019 (Note: Vivian Wong Shir Yee contested and won the by-election as a candidate of Pakatan Harapan (DAP), following the death of incumbent Stephen Wong Tien Fatt on 28 March 2019.)	PH (DAP)
P186	Sandakan	Stephen Wong Tien Fatt until 28 March 2019	PH (DAP)
P187	Kinabatangan	Bung Moktar Radin	BN (UMNO)
P188	Lahad Datu	Mohammadin Ketapi	PBM
P189	Semporna	Shafie Apdal	WARISAN
P190	Tawau	Christina Liew Chin Jin	PH (PKR)
P191	Kalabakan	Ma'mun Sulaiman	WARISAN

=== Sarawak ===
On 12 June 2018, all Sarawak-based BN parties, i.e. Parti Pesaka Bumiputera Bersatu (PBB), Parti Rakyat Sarawak (PRS), Progressive Democratic Party (PDP) and Sarawak United People's Party (SUPP), officially left BN and formed a new coalition, Gabungan Parti Sarawak, due to BN's defeat in the general elections on 9 May 2018.

No.	Federal Constituency	Member	Coalition (party)
GPS 19 | PH 7 | IND 2 | PSB 1 | PN 1 | PBM 1
P192	Mas Gading	Mordi Bimol	PH (DAP)
P193	Santubong	Wan Junaidi Tuanku Jaafar	GPS (PBB)
P194	Petra Jaya	Fadillah Yusof	GPS (PBB)
P195	Bandar Kuching	Kelvin Yii Lee Wuen	PH (DAP)
P196	Stampin	Chong Chieng Jen	PH (DAP)
P197	Kota Samarahan	Rubiah Wang	GPS (PBB)
P198	Puncak Borneo	Willie Mongin (Note: Willie Mongin contested the general election as a candidate of Pakatan Harapan (PKR), after which he resigned from the party on 24 February 2020 and became an independent. He later joined BERSATU on 22 August 2020. After he applied to join PBB, he accepted as an ordinary member on 6 August 2022.)	GPS (PBB)
P199	Serian	Richard Riot Jaem	GPS (SUPP)
P200	Batang Sadong	Nancy Shukri	GPS (PBB)
P201	Batang Lupar	Rohani Abdul Karim	GPS (PBB)
P202	Sri Aman	Masir Kujat (Note: Masir Kujat contested the general election as PRS (Barisan Nasional) candidate, after which he quit and joined PSB on 13 March 2019.)	IND
P203	Lubok Antu	Jugah Muyang (Note: Jugah Muyang contested the general election as an independent candidate, after which he joined Pakatan Harapan (PKR) on 12 May 2018. He left PKR on 5 June 2020 and became an independent.)	IND
P204	Betong	Robert Lawson Chuat	GPS (PBB)
P205	Saratok	Ali Biju (Note: Ali Biju contested the general election as a candidate of Pakatan Harapan (PKR), after which he resigned from the party on 24 February 2020 and became an independent. He later joined BERSATU on 22 August 2020.)	PN (BERSATU)
P206	Tanjong Manis	Yusuf Abd. Wahab	GPS (PBB)
P207	Igan	Ahmad Johnie Zawawi	GPS (PBB)
P208	Sarikei	Wong Ling Biu	PH (DAP)
P209	Julau	Larry S'ng Wei Shien (Note: Larry S'ng Wei Shien contested the general election as an independent candidate, after which he joined Pakatan Harapan (PKR) on 12 May 2018. He then resigned from the party on 28 February 2021 and became an independent.)	PBM
P210	Kanowit	Aaron Ago Dagang	GPS (PRS)
P211	Lanang	Alice Lau Kiong Yieng	PH (DAP)
P212	Sibu	Oscar Ling Chai Yew	PH (DAP)
P213	Mukah	Hanifah Hajar Taib	GPS (PBB)
P214	Selangau	Baru Bian (Note: Baru Bian contested the general election as a candidate of Pakatan Harapan (PKR), after which he resign from the party on 24 February 2020, becoming an independent, later joining Parti Sarawak Bersatu on 30 May 2020.)	PSB
P215	Kapit	Alexander Nanta Linggi	GPS (PBB)
P216	Hulu Rajang	Wilson Ugak Kumbong	GPS (PRS)
P217	Bintulu	Tiong King Sing	GPS (PDP)
P218	Sibuti	Lukanisman Awang Sauni	GPS (PBB)
P219	Miri	Michael Teo Yu Keng	PH (PKR)
P220	Baram	Anyi Ngau	GPS (PDP)
P221	Limbang	Hasbi Habibollah	GPS (PBB)
P222	Lawas	Henry Sum Agong	GPS (PBB)
