= Joseph Salang Gandum =

Malaysian politician

Yang Berbahagia Dato Sri Joseph Salang Gandum PNBS PGBK DSPN AMN

Deputy Minister of Information, Communications and Culture
- In office 27 March 2008 – 15 May 2013 Serving with Heng Seai Kie (2008–2010), Maglin Dennis D'Cruz (2010–2013) & Tan Lian Hoe (2008–2009)
- Monarchs: Mizan Zainal Abidin (2008–2011); Abdul Halim (2011–2013)
- Prime Minister: Abdullah Ahmad Badawi; Najib Razak
- Minister: Ahmad Shabery Cheek; Rais Yatim
- Preceded by: Himself (Communication); Tan Lian Hoe (Information); Teng Boon Soon (Culture)
- Succeeded by: Jailani Johari (Communication); Mas Ermieyati Samsudin (Culture)
- Constituency: Julau

Deputy Minister of Energy, Water and Communications
- In office 19 March – 27 March 2008
- Monarch: Mizan Zainal Abidin
- Prime Minister: Abdullah Ahmad Badawi
- Minister: Shaziman Abu Mansor
- Preceded by: Shaziman Abu Mansor
- Succeeded by: Himself (Communications); Noriah Kasnon (Energy, Water)
- Constituency: Julau

Deputy Minister of Foreign Affairs
- In office 27 March 2004 – 19 March 2008
- Monarchs: Sirajuddin (2004–2006); Mizan Zainal Abidin (2006–2008)
- Prime Minister: Abdullah Ahmad Badawi
- Minister: Syed Hamid Albar
- Preceded by: Leo Michael Toyad
- Succeeded by: Abdul Rahim Bakri
- Constituency: Julau

Member of the Malaysian Parliament for Julau
- In office 29 November 1999 – 9 May 2018
- Preceded by: Sng Chee Hua (BN–PBDS)
- Succeeded by: Larry Sng Wei Shien (Independent)
- Majority: 6,286 (1999); 2,688 (2004); 7,584 (2008); 5,955 (2013)

2nd President of Parti Rakyat Sarawak
- In office 31 October 2021 – 19 October 2025; Acting: 31 October 2021–26 April 2022
- Deputy: Majang Renggi
- Preceded by: James Jemut Masing
- Succeeded by: John Sikie Tayai

Deputy President of Parti Rakyat Sarawak
- In office 20 October 2018 – 31 October 2021
- President: James Jemut Masing (2018–2021); Himself (Acting, 2021–2022)
- Preceded by: Joseph Entulu Belaun
- Succeeded by: Majang Renggi

Secretary-General of Parti Rakyat Sarawak
- In office 25 October 2016 – 20 October 2018
- President: James Jemut Masing
- Succeeded by: Janang Bungsu

Personal details
- Born: 1 January 1951 (age 75) Crown Colony of Sarawak (now Sarawak, Malaysia)
- Party: Parti Bansa Dayak Sarawak (PBDS); Parti Rakyat Sarawak (PRS)
- Other political affiliations: Barisan Nasional (BN) (1999–2018, aligned; since 2020); Gabungan Parti Sarawak (GPS) (since 2018); Perikatan Nasional (PN) (aligned; 2020–2022)
- Spouse: Lucy Hon
- Occupation: Politician
- Profession: Bank officer (retired)

Joseph Salang Gandum (born 1 January 1951) is a Malaysian politician and former bank officer who served as the Deputy Minister of Information, Communications and Culture, Deputy Minister of Energy, Water and Communications and Deputy Minister of Foreign Affairs in the Barisan Nasional (BN) administration under former Prime Ministers Abdullah Ahmad Badawi, Najib Razak and former Ministers Rais Yatim, Shaziman Abu Mansor, Ahmad Shabery Cheek and Syed Hamid Albar from March 2004 to May 2013 as well as the Member of Parliament (MP) for Julau from November 1999 to May 2018. He is a member of the Parti Rakyat Sarawak (PRS), a component party of the Gabungan Parti Sarawak (GPS) and formerly BN coalitions and was a member of the Parti Bansa Dayak Sarawak (PBDS), also a component party of the BN coalition. He served as the 2nd President of PRS from October 2021 to October 2025, when he has served in official capacity from April 2022 to October 2025 and in acting capacity from October 2021 to April 2022. He also served as the Deputy President of PRS from October 2018 to his official promotion to the party presidency in October 2021 and Secretary-General of PRS from October 2016 to his promotion to party deputy presidency in October 2018. In addition, he was also previously one of the vice-presidents of PRS, prior to being made party secretary-general.

Salang was a bank officer before entering politics. He was elected to Parliament in the 1999 election. He was originally a member (and deputy president) of the Sarawak Native People's Party (PBDS), but sat in Parliament without a party after the PBDS was deregistered in 2004. He eventually joined the PRS ahead of the 2008 election.

Salang has served in a number of government posts, including Deputy Minister of Foreign Affairs, Deputy Minister of Energy, Water and Communications, and Deputy Minister of Information, Communications and Culture. He turned down reappointment to the deputy ministry after the 2013 election.

== Election results ==
Parliament of Malaysia
| Year | Constituency | Candidate | Votes | Pct | Opponent(s) | Votes | Pct | Ballots cast | Majority | Turnout |
|---|---|---|---|---|---|---|---|---|---|---|
| 1999 | P182 Julau | Joseph Salang Gandum (PBDS) | 9,183 | 66.99% | Kong Ah Huat (IND) | 2,897 | 21.14% | 13,707 | 6,286 | 75.55% |
| 1999 | P182 Julau | Joseph Salang Gandum (PBDS) | 9,183 | 66.99% | Samuel Edward Chun (IND) | 844 | 6.16% | 13,707 | 6,286 | 75.55% |
| 1999 | P182 Julau | Joseph Salang Gandum (PBDS) | 9,183 | 66.99% | Patrick Mit @ Dumit Tutong (IND) | 483 | 3.52% | 13,707 | 6,286 | 75.55% |
| 2004 | P208 Julau | Joseph Salang Gandum (PBDS) | 8,388 | 58.78% | Randan Mawat (IND) | 5,700 | 39.94% | 14,271 | 2,688 | 72.20% |
| 2008 | P209 Julau | Joseph Salang Gandum (PRS) | 10,351 | 77.75% | Labang Jamba (PKR) | 2,767 | 20.78% | 13,313 | 7,584 | 65.56% |
| 2013 | P209 Julau | Joseph Salang Gandum (PRS) | 9,891 | 58.27% | Wong Judat (SWP) | 3,936 | 23.19% | 16,973 | 5,955 | 75.36% |
| 2013 | P209 Julau | Joseph Salang Gandum (PRS) | 9,891 | 58.27% | Wong Hong Yu (PKR) | 2,852 | 16.80% | 16,973 | 5,955 | 75.36% |
| 2018 | P209 Julau | Joseph Salang Gandum (PRS) | 8,174 | 44.02% | Larry Sng Wei Shien (IND) | 10,105 | 54.42% | 18,569 | 1,931 | 73.16% |
| 2022 | P209 Julau | Joseph Salang Gandum (PRS) | 7,819 | 34.69% | Larry Sng Wei Shien (PBM) | 9,159 | 40.64% | 22,537 | 1,340 | 64.67% |
| 2022 | P209 Julau | Joseph Salang Gandum (PRS) | 7,819 | 34.69% | Elly Lawai Ngalai (IND) | 5,224 | 23.18% | 22,537 | 1,340 | 64.67% |
| 2022 | P209 Julau | Joseph Salang Gandum (PRS) | 7,819 | 34.69% | Susan George (PBDS) | 335 | 1.49% | 22,537 | 1,340 | 64.67% |

== Honours ==
- Malaysia
  - Member of the Order of the Defender of the Realm (AMN) (2000)
- Penang
  - Officer of the Order of the Defender of State (DSPN) – Dato' (2003)
- Sarawak
  - Knight Commander of the Most Exalted Order of the Star of Sarawak (PNBS) – Dato Sri (2025)
  - Commander of the Order of the Star of Hornbill Sarawak (PGBK) – Datuk (2011)
  - Gold Medal of the Sarawak Independence Diamond Jubilee Medal (2023)
