= People's Justice Party (Malaysia) Spokesperson =

This article lists spokesperson of Parti KEADILAN Rakyat (PKR) of Malaysia in the 14th Parliament as of 4 July 2020. The purpose of the spokesperson in parliament is solely to shadow the ministries and portfolios under the Perikatan Nasional government, in other words, to act as a shadow cabinet.

== Spokesperson ==
Spokesperson
Spokesperson	Portfolio	Constituency
Dato' Seri Anwar Ibrahim	Leader of the Opposition	Port Dickson
Dato' Seri Dr Wan Azizah Wan Ismail	Chairman of KEADILAN Spokesperson	Pandan
Dato Johari Abdul	Defence and Home Affairs	Sungai Petani
Datuk Seri Saifuddin Nasution Ismail	Finance, Cost of Living and Consumer Affairs	Kulim-Bandar Baharu
Dato' Dr Xavier Jayakumar	Natural Resources, Water and Energy	Kuala Langat
Chang Lih Kang	Housing, Local Government and Infrastructure	Tanjong Malim
Nurul Izzah Anwar	Women, Family and Community Development	Permatang Pauh
Dr Lee Boon Chye	Health	Gopeng
Hajjah Fuziah Salleh	Environment	Kuantan
Wong Chen	International Trade and Industry	Subang
Nik Nazmi Nik Ahmad	Education	Setiawangsa
Larry Sng Wei Shien	Sabah and Sarawak	Julau
Datuk Seri Shamsul Iskandar Mohd. Akin	Rural Development	Hang Tuah Jaya
Akmal Nasir	Youth and Sports	Johor Bahru
Syed Ibrahim Syed Noh	Digital Technology, Telecommunications and Transport	Ledang
Dato' Abdullah Sani Abdul Hamid	Work and Worker's Rights	Kapar
Ahmad Fahmi Mohamed Fadzil	Communications, Arts and Culture	Lembah Pantai
William Leong Jee Keen	Parliament and Administration	Selayang
Muhammad Bakhtiar Wan Chik	Tourism	Balik Pulau
Sim Tze Tzin	Agriculture and Commodities	Bayan Baru
Sivarasa Rasiah	Law	Sungai Buloh

== Deputy Spokesperson ==
Besides these Spokesperson, there are also several deputy spokesperson for some portfolios.

Deputy Spokesperson
Spokesperson	Portfolio	Constituency
Karuppaiya Muthusamy	Defence and Home Affairs	Padang Serai
Steven Choong Shiau Yoon	Finance, Cost of Living and Consumer Affairs	Tebrau
Dr Michael Teo Yu Keng	Natural Resources, Water and Energy	Miri
Noor Amin Ahmad	Housing, Local Government and Infrastructure	Kangar
Nor Azrina Surip	Women, Family and Community Development	Merbok
Dr Azman Ismail	Health	Kuala Kedah
Maria Chin Abdullah	Environment	Petaling Jaya
Datin Paduka Dr Tan Yee Kew	International Trade and Industry	Wangsa Maju
Rusnah Aluai	Education	Tangga Batu
Awang Husaini Sahari	Sabah and Sarawak	Putatan
Kesavan Subramaniam	Rural Development	Sungai Siput
P. Prabakaran	Youth and Sports	Batu
June Leow Hsiad Hui	Digital Technology, Telecommunications and Transport	Hulu Selangor
Hassan Abdul Karim	Work and Worker's Rights	Pasir Gudang
Chan Ming Kai	Communications, Arts and Cultures	Alor Setar
Datuk Christina Liew Chin Jin	Tourism	Tawau
Hajah Natrah Ismail	Agriculture and Commodities	Sekijang
