= Julau (federal constituency) =

Federal constituency of Sarawak, Malaysia

Julau (P209)
Sarawak constituency

Federal constituency
- Legislature: Dewan Rakyat
- MP: Larry Sng Wei Shien; PBM
- Constituency created: 1968
- First contested: 1969
- Last contested: 2022

Demographics
- Population (2020): 35,126
- Electors (2022): 34,850
- Area (km²): 2,858
- Pop. density (per km²): 12.3

Julau is a federal constituency in Sarikei Division (Sarikei District, Pakan District and Julau District), Sarawak, Malaysia, that has been represented in the Dewan Rakyat since 1971.

The federal constituency was created in the 1968 redistribution and is mandated to return a single member to the Dewan Rakyat under the first past the post voting system.

== Demographics ==
https://ge15.orientaldaily.com.my/seats/sarawak/p

Ethnic breakdown of Julau's electorate as of 2022
1. Sarawak bumiputera (91.8%)
2. Chinese (5.30%)
3. Malay-Muslim bumiputera (1.40%)
4. Other ethnicities (1.50%)

As of 2020, Julau has a population of 35,126 people.

Age breakdown of Julau's electorate as of 2022
1. 18-20 (6.30%)
2. 21-29 (20.5%)
3. 30-39 (20.0%)
4. 40-49 (17.9%)
5. 50-59 (16.8%)
6. 60-69 (10.4%)
7. 70-79 (5.25%)
8. 80-89 (1.98%)
9. above 90 (1.02%)
Gender breakdown of Julau's electorate as of 2022
1. Male (51.0%)
2. Female (49.0%)

== History ==
=== Polling districts ===
According to the gazette issued on 31 October 2022, the Julau constituency has a total of 11 polling districts.

| State constituency | Polling Districts | Code | Location |
|---|---|---|---|
| Pakan (N47) | Bayong | 209/47/01 | SK Balong Sg. Rian; SK Udin Ng. Bayong; RH Andrew Mangka Sg. Ribong; RH Tirai Sebangkoi |
| Pakan (N47) | Sungai Rusa | 209/47/02 | SK Penghulu Anding; SJK (C) Su Dok |
| Pakan (N47) | Babai | 209/47/03 | RH Budum Ng. Tubai Buah; SJK (C) Su Dok; RH Budim Ng Tubai Buah; SK Ulu Pedanum; SK Ng. Buku; SK Babai |
| Pakan (N47) | Lamujan | 209/47/04 | SK Ng. Pakan; SK Ulu Manding; SK Sg. Sugai |
| Pakan (N47) | Wuak | 209/47/05 | RH Julius Duat Maur @ Julius Edward; SK Ng. Kedup; RH Mandau Sg. Marau Pakan; SK Ng. Wuak |
| Pakan (N47) | Dayu | 209/47/06 | SK Ng. Kota; SK Ng. Wak; SK Ng. Dayu; SK Ng. Kara; SK Ng. Sembawang; RH Ko Ak Changgan Sg. Balong |
| Meluan (N48) | Balut | 209/48/01 | SK Ng. Lasi; SK Ng. Serau |
| Meluan (N48) | Julau | 209/48/02 | RH Kapol Ng. Bua; SJK (C) Yuk Kung |
| Meluan (N48) | Rayah | 209/48/03 | Balai Raya RH Lidoh; SK St Alphonsus |
| Meluan (N48) | Meluan | 209/48/04 | SK Ng. Kelangas; SK Sg. Merurun; RH Genta Ng Bilat/Lijan; SK Ng. Meluan |
| Meluan (N48) | Engkamup | 209/48/05 | SK Ng. Sengaih; SK Ng. Engkamop |
| Meluan (N48) | Entabai | 209/48/06 | SK Ng. Entaih; SK Ulu Entabai; SK Ulu Entaih Entabai |
| Meluan (N48) | Beketan | 209/48/07 | SK Ng. Jambu; SK Ng. Ensiring; SK Tapang Punggu; SK Ng. Ju Ulu Mujok; SK Ng. Maong; SK Lubok Assam; SK Ng. Entabai |

=== Representation history ===
Members of Parliament for Julau
| Parliament | No | Years | Member | Party | Vote Share |
Constituency created
| | | 1969-1971 | Parliament was suspended | | |
| 3rd | P137 | 1971-1973 | Banyang Janting | PESAKA | 2,330; 50.69% |
| 3rd | P137 | 1973-1974 | Banyang Janting | BN (PESAKA) | 2,330; 50.69% |
| 4th | P147 | 1974-1976 | Thomas Salang Siden | SNAP | 3,933; 64.51% |
| 4th | P147 | 1976-1978 | Thomas Salang Siden | BN (SNAP) | 3,933; 64.51% |
| 5th | P147 | 1978-1982 | Thomas Salang Siden | BN (SNAP) | 3,637; 81.88% |
| 6th | P147 | 1982-1986 | Thomas Salang Siden | BN (SNAP) | 4,560; 68.46% |
| 7th | P170 | 1986-1990 | Thomas Salang Siden | BN (PBDS) | 4,920; 60.97% |
| 8th | P169 | 1990-1995 | Thomas Salang Siden | BN (PBDS) | 5,886; 52.06% |
| 9th | P181 | 1995-1999 | Sng Chee Hua (孙志桦) | BN (PBDS) | 10,730; 86.94% |
| 10th | P182 | 1999-2004 | Joseph Salang Gandum | BN (PRS) | 9,138; 68.49% |
| 11th | P208 | 2004-2008 | Joseph Salang Gandum | BN (PRS) | 8,388; 59.54% |
| 12th | P209 | 2008-2013 | Joseph Salang Gandum | BN (PRS) | 10,351; 78.91% |
| 13th | P209 | 2013-2018 | Joseph Salang Gandum | BN (PRS) | 9,891; 59.30% |
| 14th | P209 | 2018 | Larry Sng Wei Shien (孙伟瑄) | Independent | 10,105; 55.28% |
| 14th | P209 | 2018-2021 | Larry Sng Wei Shien (孙伟瑄) | PH (PKR) | 10,105; 55.28% |
| 14th | P209 | 2021 | Larry Sng Wei Shien (孙伟瑄) | Independent | 10,105; 55.28% |
| 14th | P209 | 2021–2022 | Larry Sng Wei Shien (孙伟瑄) | PBM | 10,105; 55.28% |
| 15th | P209 | 2022–present | Larry Sng Wei Shien (孙伟瑄) | PBM | 9,159; 40.64% |

=== State constituency ===
| Parliamentary constituency | State constituency | | | | | |
| Parliamentary constituency | 1969–1978 | 1978–1990 | 1990–1999 | 1999–2008 | 2008–2016 | 2016−present |
|---|---|---|---|---|---|---|
| Julau | Meluan | | | | | |
| Julau | Pakan | | | | | |

=== Historical boundaries ===
| State Constituency | Area | | | | | |
| State Constituency | 1968 | 1977 | 1987 | 1996 | 2005 | 2015 |
|---|---|---|---|---|---|---|
| Meluan | Abau; Bantan; Entabai; Julau; Meluan | | Bantan; Entabai; Julau; Meluan; Nanga Serau | | | |
| Pakan | Dayu; Lamujan; Nanga Kara; Pakan; Wuak | | Dayu; Bayong; Lamujan; Pakan; Wuak | | | |

=== Current state assembly members ===
| No. | State Constituency | Member | Coalition (Party) |
|---|---|---|---|
| N47 | Pakan | William Mawan Ikom | GPS (PBB) |
| N48 | Meluan | Rolland Duat Jubin | GPS (PRS) |

=== Local governments & postcodes ===
| No. | State Constituency | Local Government | Postcode |
|---|---|---|---|
| N47 | Pakan | Sarikei District Council (Sungai Rusa and Bayong areas); Maradong & Julau District Council | 96100 Sarikei; 96600 Julau |
| N48 | Meluan | Maradong & Julau District Council | 96100 Sarikei; 96600 Julau |

== Election results ==
Malaysian general election, 2022
| Party | Candidate | Votes | % | ∆% |
|---|---|---|---|---|
| PBM | Larry Sng Wei Shien | 9,159 | 40.64 | ▲40.64 |
| GPS | Joseph Salang Gandum | 7,819 | 34.69 | ▲34.69 |
| Independent | Elly Lawai Ngalai | 5,224 | 23.18 | ▲23.18 |
| PBDS Baru | Susan George | 335 | 1.49 | ▲1.49 |
| Total valid votes | | 22,537 | 100.00 | |
| Total rejected ballots | | 331 | | |
| Unreturned ballots | | 59 | | |
| Turnout | | 22,927 | 64.67 | ▼8.49 |
| Registered electors | | 34,850 | | |
| Majority | | 1,340 | 5.95 | ▼4.61 |
| PBM gain from Independent | | Swing | | ? |
Source(s) https://lom.agc.gov.my/ilims/upload/portal/akta/outputp/1753265/PARLIMEN%20SARAWAK%20(PUB%20620).pdf

Malaysian general election, 2018
| Party | Candidate | Votes | % | ∆% |
|---|---|---|---|---|
| Independent | Larry Sng Wei Shien | 10,105 | 55.28 | ▲55.28 |
| BN | Joseph Salang Gandum | 8,174 | 44.72 | ▼14.58 |
| Total valid votes | | 18,279 | 100.00 | |
| Total rejected ballots | | 241 | | |
| Unreturned ballots | | 49 | | |
| Turnout | | 18,569 | 73.16 | ▼2.20 |
| Registered electors | | 25,380 | | |
| Majority | | 1,931 | 10.56 | ▼25.14 |
| Independent gain from BN | | Swing | | ? |
Source(s) "His Majesty's Government Gazette - Notice of Contested Election, Parliament for the State of Sarawak [P.U. (B) 247/2018]" (PDF). Attorney General's Chambers of Malaysia. 3 May 2018. "Federal Government Gazette - Results of Contested Election and Statements of the Poll after the Official Addition of Votes, Parliamentary Constituencies for the State of Sarawak [P.U. (B) 321/2018]" (PDF). Attorney General's Chambers of Malaysia. 28 May 2018. Archived from the original (PDF) on 2019-12-29.

Malaysian general election, 2013
| Party | Candidate | Votes | % | ∆% |
|---|---|---|---|---|
| BN | Joseph Salang Gandum | 9,891 | 59.30 | ▼19.61 |
| Sarawak Workers Party | Wong Judat | 3,936 | 23.60 | ▲23.60 |
| PKR | Andy Wong Hong Yu | 2,852 | 17.10 | ▼3.99 |
| Total valid votes | | 16,679 | 100.00 | |
| Total rejected ballots | | 278 | | |
| Unreturned ballots | | 16 | | |
| Turnout | | 16,973 | 75.36 | ▲9.80 |
| Registered electors | | 22,522 | | |
| Majority | | 5,955 | 35.70 | ▼22.12 |
| BN hold | | Swing | | |
Source(s) "Federal Government Gazette - Notice of Contested Election, Parliament for the State of Sarawak [P.U. (B) 184/2013]" (PDF). Attorney General's Chambers of Malaysia. 26 April 2013. Archived from the original (PDF) on 2018-09-30. "Federal Government Gazette - Results of Contested Election and Statements of the Poll after the Official Addition of Votes, Parliamentary Constituencies for the State of Sarawak [P.U. (B) 225/2013]" (PDF). Attorney General's Chambers of Malaysia. 22 May 2013. Archived from the original (PDF) on 2018-09-30.

Malaysian general election, 2008
| Party | Candidate | Votes | % | ∆% |
|---|---|---|---|---|
| BN | Joseph Salang Gandum | 10,351 | 78.91 | ▲19.36 |
| PKR | Labang Jamba | 2,767 | 21.09 | ▲21.09 |
| Total valid votes | | 13,118 | 100.00 | |
| Total rejected ballots | | 182 | | |
| Unreturned ballots | | 13 | | |
| Turnout | | 13,313 | 65.56 | ▼6.64 |
| Registered electors | | 20,306 | | |
| Majority | | 7,584 | 57.82 | ▲38.74 |
| BN hold | | Swing | | |

Malaysian general election, 2004
| Party | Candidate | Votes | % | ∆% |
|---|---|---|---|---|
| BN | Joseph Salang Gandum | 8,388 | 59.54 | ▼8.95 |
| Independent | Randan Mawat | 5,700 | 40.46 | ▲40.46 |
| Total valid votes | | 14,088 | 100.00 | |
| Total rejected ballots | | 176 | | |
| Unreturned ballots | | 7 | | |
| Turnout | | 14,271 | 72.20 | ▼3.35 |
| Registered electors | | 19,765 | | |
| Majority | | 2,688 | 19.08 | ▼27.80 |
| BN hold | | Swing | | |

Malaysian general election, 1999
| Party | Candidate | Votes | % | ∆% |
|---|---|---|---|---|
| BN | Joseph Salang Gandum | 9,183 | 68.49 | ▼18.45 |
| Independent | Kong Ah Huat | 2,897 | 21.61 | ▲21.61 |
| Independent | Samuel Edward Chun | 844 | 6.30 | ▲6.30 |
| Independent | Patrick Mit @ Dumit Tutong | 483 | 3.60 | ▲3.60 |
| Total valid votes | | 13,407 | 100.00 | |
| Total rejected ballots | | 285 | | |
| Unreturned ballots | | 15 | | |
| Turnout | | 13,707 | 75.55 | ▼1.98 |
| Registered electors | | 18,141 | | |
| Majority | | 6,286 | 46.88 | ▼30.17 |
| BN hold | | Swing | | |

Malaysian general election, 1995
| Party | Candidate | Votes | % | ∆% |
|---|---|---|---|---|
| BN | Sng Chee Hua | 10,730 | 86.94 | ▲34.88 |
| Independent | Edward Empra Kadom | 1,221 | 9.89 | ▲9.89 |
| Independent | Entalai Munan | 391 | 3.17 | ▲3.17 |
| Total valid votes | | 12,342 | 100.00 | |
| Total rejected ballots | | 182 | | |
| Unreturned ballots | | 34 | | |
| Turnout | | 12,558 | 77.53 | ▼1.62 |
| Registered electors | | 16,198 | | |
| Majority | | 9,509 | 77.05 | ▲72.93 |
| BN hold | | Swing | | |

Malaysian general election, 1990
| Party | Candidate | Votes | % | ∆% |
|---|---|---|---|---|
| BN | Thomas Salang Siden | 5,886 | 52.06 | ▼8.91 |
| Independent | William Mawan Ikom | 5,421 | 47.94 | ▲47.94 |
| Total valid votes | | 11,307 | 100.00 | |
| Total rejected ballots | | 266 | | |
| Unreturned ballots | | 0 | | |
| Turnout | | 11,573 | 79.15 | ▲10.01 |
| Registered electors | | 14,622 | | |
| Majority | | 465 | 4.12 | ▼17.82 |
| BN hold | | Swing | | |

Malaysian general election, 1986
| Party | Candidate | Votes | % | ∆% |
|---|---|---|---|---|
| BN | Thomas Salang Siden | 4,920 | 60.97 | ▼7.49 |
| Independent | Richard Lee Ngumbang | 3,150 | 39.03 | ▲39.03 |
| Total valid votes | | 8,070 | 100.00 | |
| Total rejected ballots | | 352 | | |
| Unreturned ballots | | 0 | | |
| Turnout | | 8,422 | 69.14 | ▲3.54 |
| Registered electors | | 12,181 | | |
| Majority | | 1,770 | 21.94 | ▼14.98 |
| BN hold | | Swing | | |

Malaysian general election, 1982
| Party | Candidate | Votes | % | ∆% |
|---|---|---|---|---|
| BN | Thomas Salang Siden | 4,560 | 68.46 | ▼13.42 |
| Independent | Galal Itam | 2,101 | 31.54 | ▲31.54 |
| Total valid votes | | 6,661 | 100.00 | |
| Total rejected ballots | | 374 | | |
| Unreturned ballots | | 0 | | |
| Turnout | | 7,035 | 65.60 | ▲4.38 |
| Registered electors | | 10,724 | | |
| Majority | | 2,459 | 36.92 | ▼26.84 |
| BN hold | | Swing | | |

Malaysian general election, 1978
| Party | Candidate | Votes | % | ∆% |
|---|---|---|---|---|
| BN | Thomas Salang Siden | 3,637 | 81.88 | ▲81.88 |
| Independent | Nyadang Janting | 805 | 18.12 | ▲18.12 |
| Total valid votes | | 4,442 | 100.00 | |
| Total rejected ballots | | 295 | | |
| Unreturned ballots | | 0 | | |
| Turnout | | 5,868 | 61.22 | ▼9.24 |
| Registered electors | | 9,585 | | |
| Majority | | 2,832 | 63.76 | |
| BN gain from SNAP | | Swing | | ? |

Malaysian general election, 1974
| Party | Candidate | Votes | % | ∆% |
|---|---|---|---|---|
| SNAP | Thomas Salang Siden | 3,933 | 64.51 | ▲15.20 |
| BN | Mambang Alexander Timber | 2,164 | 35.49 | ▲35.49 |
| Total valid votes | | 6,097 | 100.00 | |
| Total rejected ballots | | 378 | | |
| Unreturned ballots | | 0 | | |
| Turnout | | 6,475 | 70.46 | ▼1.27 |
| Registered electors | | 9,190 | | |
| Majority | | 1,769 | 29.02 | ▲27.64 |
| SNAP gain from PESAKA | | Swing | | ? |

Malaysian general election, 1969
| Party | Candidate | Votes | % |
|---|---|---|---|
| PESAKA | Banyang Janting | 2,330 | 50.69 |
| SNAP | Thomas Salang Siden | 2,267 | 49.31 |
| Total valid votes | | 4,597 | 100.00 |
| Total rejected ballots | | 689 | |
| Unreturned ballots | | 0 | |
| Turnout | | 5,286 | 69.19 |
| Registered electors | | 7,640 | |
| Majority | | 63 | 1.38 |
This was a new constituency created.
