= Larry Sng =

Malaysian politician (born 1979)

Yang Berhormat Datuk Larry Sng DPSM MP
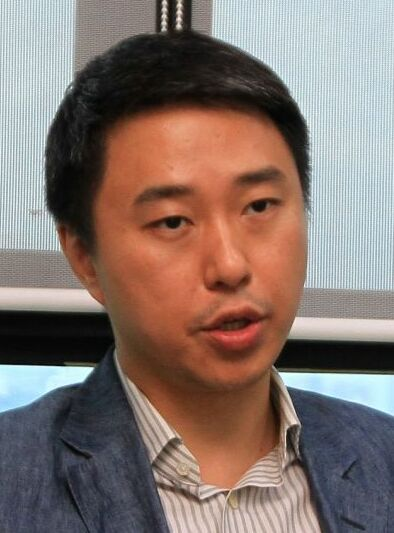
- Sng in 2022

1st President of the Parti Bangsa Malaysia
- Incumbent
- Assumed office 8 January 2022
- Deputy: Haniza Talha (2022); Wong Judat (since 2022); Choong Shiau Yoon (since 2023)
- Preceded by: Position established

State Chairman of the People's Justice Party of Sarawak
- In office 13 March 2020 – 27 February 2021
- President: Anwar Ibrahim
- Preceded by: Baru Bian
- Succeeded by: Abang Zulkifli Abang Engkeh

Member of the Malaysian Parliament for Julau
- Incumbent
- Assumed office 9 May 2018
- Preceded by: Joseph Salang Gandum (BN–PRS)
- Majority: 1,931 (2018); 1,340 (2022)

Ministerial roles (Sarawak)
- 2004–2011: Assistant Minister in the Chief Minister's Office
- 2004–2011: Assistant Minister of Industrial Development
- 2009–2011: Assistant Minister of Youth

Faction represented in Dewan Rakyat
- 2018–2021: Pakatan Harapan
- 2021: Independent
- 2021–: Parti Bangsa Malaysia

Faction represented in Sarawak State Legislative Assembly
- 2001–2011: Barisan Nasional

Personal details
- Born: Larry Sng Wei Shien; 14 September 1979 (age 47) Taipei, Taiwan
- Citizenship: Malaysia
- Party: Parti Bangsa Malaysia (since 2021); People's Justice Party (2019–21); Sarawak Workers Party (2012–17); Independent (2007–12, 2017–19, 2021); Sarawak Peoples' Party (2004–07); Parti Bansa Dayak (2001–04)
- Other political affiliations: Pakatan Harapan (2018–2021, since 2022); Perikatan Nasional (2021–2022); Barisan Nasional (2007–12, since 2021)
- Spouse: May Ting (m. 2006)
- Relations: Sng Chin Joo (grandfather; deceased); Ting Pek Khiing (father-in-law; deceased)
- Parents: Sng Chee Hua (father); Susan Sng (mother)
- Education: London School of Economics
- Occupation: Politician; businessman
- Website: Larry Sng on Parliament of Malaysia

Chinese name
- Traditional Chinese: 孫偉瑄
- Simplified Chinese: 孙伟瑄
- Hanyu Pinyin: Sūn Wěixuān
- Jyutping: Syun1 Wai5 Syun1
- Hokkien POJ: Sun Úi-soan
- Tâi-lô: Sun Uí-suan

Larry Sng Wei Shien (Note: simplified Chinese: 孙伟瑄; traditional Chinese: 孫偉瑄; pinyin: Sūn Wěixuān; Pe̍h-ōe-jī: Sun Úi-soan; Sng (surname) also romanized as Soon especially in regions with Mandarin-cum-Pinyin-practicing populations.) (born 14 September 1979) is a Malaysian politician who served as the Member of Parliament (MP) for Julau since 2018. A member of Parti Bangsa Malaysia (PBM), he served as member of the Sarawak State Legislative Assembly for Pelagus from 2001 to 2011. Sng is also the president of PBM since 2022.

Born in Taipei, he was previously the State Chairman of the People's Justice Party (PKR) of Sarawak, a component party of the Pakatan Harapan (PH) coalition. On 28 February 2021, he left PKR to become an independent again and declared support for the ruling Perikatan Nasional (PN) coalition. He is currently the President of Parti Bangsa Malaysia (PBM) and has served in this role since January 2022. Following the 2022 general election, he is presently the sole PBM MP and his party is aligned to the Unity Government.

== Early life and education ==
Sng was born on 14 September 1979 in Taipei to a Sarawakian businessman-politician father Sng Chee Hua and Taiwanese-born mother Susan Sng. His father is the former one-term Julau MP from 1995 to 1999, two-term Pelagus assemblyman from 1991 to 2001 and a renowned corporate player. Meanwhile, his grandfather, Sng Chin Joo was also a Member of Parliament and Council Negri (now Sarawak State Legislative Assembly) member in 1963 and the Kapitan Cina in Kapit in the mid-80s. Their family has a good long track record with the Iban community in Sarawak, having resided in Jalan Airport, Kapit for a long time and are non-native fluent speakers of the local native Iban language despite being of ethnic unmixed full-blooded Chinese descent (since he is of paternal Teochew and maternal Hokkien ancestry, for Datin Susan Sng was a Hoklo Taiwanese married to Dato' Sng, who was a local-born Chinese of Teochew ancestry).

Sng grew up in Kuala Lumpur and in England and studied at the London School of Economics.

== Political career ==
Sng joined the Sarawak Native People's Party (PBDS) in 2001 when he was 22. He first stood on the PBDS ticket in 2001 state election, replacing his father as the Pelagus representative. He had served two terms as Barisan Nasional (BN) state assemblyman of Sarawak for Pelagus from 2001 to 2011. Under the Chief Minister Abdul Taib Mahmud BN's administration in 2004, he was the Sarawak's youngest assistant minister when appointed the Assistant Minister in the Chief Minister's Office (Economic Planning) as well as Assistant Minister of Industrial Development (Planning).

Sng joined the new Parti Rakyat Sarawak (PRS) in 2004 which was founded by James Jemut Masing and his father the senior Sng in the wake of the de-registration of PBDS and succeeded it as a component of BN. In 2006 state election, he retained his Pelagus seat as a PRS candidate. He had been the PRS deputy secretary general under the presidency of Masing until a leadership tussle between them resulted in the revocation of Sng's party membership for insubordination in 2007.

In 2009, he was given additional portfolio of Assistant Minister of Youth (Training) albeit being a 'partyless independent' pro-BN status. He was subsequently dropped from contesting and defending the Pelagus state assembly seat under BN's banner in 2011 state election. Sng retained his position as the deputy chairman of Sarawak Convention Bureau (SCB) as well as Sarawak Convention Centre (now Borneo Convention Centre Kuching, BCCK) and was appointed Youth Affairs advisor to the Chief Minister Taib Mahmud's state government in 2012 amid his BN-friendly status.

Sng resigned from all his government appointments in 2013 to assume the position of founding president of the just formed Sarawak Workers Party (SWP) which proclaimed to be BN-friendly too. In the 2013 general election (GE13), he contested as SWP candidate in Lubok Antu parliamentary seat but lost. In March 2016, while serving as the SWP party president Sng had initially planned to contest the newly created state constituency of Bukit Goram in upcoming 2016 state election, but later in April he unexpectedly resigned from the party instead thus renouncing his candidacy. He explained he has quit although he could have won because he felt he could not truly serve the constituents without being in BN in an emotional post on his Facebook.

In the 2018 general election (GE14), Sng had contested as an Independent candidate and elected the MP for the Julau federal constituency by 10,105 of the 18,279 votes cast. He defeated Joseph Salang Gandum the four-term incumbent and PRS deputy president. He joined the PKR which is part of new Pakatan Harapan (PH) ruling coalition shortly after his victory in the election. He was picked during the PH's rules as chairman of the Malaysian Pepper Board (MPB) under the federal Ministry of Plantation Industries and Commodities from May 2018 to April 2020.

Following the collapse of PH in the February 2020 Malaysian political crisis also dubbed as 'Sheraton Move', Sng was then appointed as the Sarawak chief of PKR left vacant by incumbent Baru Bian who had turned to be independent and joined Parti Sarawak Bersatu (PSB). He announced on 21 December he was stepping down from the post only to retract it after persuasion including by Anwar Ibrahim later. Somehow in February 2021 he eventually quit PKR to revert to be an independent MP but supports the new Prime Minister Muhyiddin Yassin and his led Perikatan Nasional (PN) administration. Sng explained that he just wanted a stable government and continued backing UMNO's Ismail Sabri Yaakob as the new PN's Prime Minister following the resignation of Muhyiddin as the PN chairman on 16 August. Sng has been appointed as the new chairman of Malaysian Palm Oil Council (MPOC), a GLC to promote the market expansion of Malaysian palm oil and its products with effect from 1 October.

Together with Steven Choong, he announced the formation of Parti Bangsa Malaysia (PBM) on 19 November 2021.

Sng was appointed as the chairman of the Malaysian Timber Industry Board on 5 May 2023.

== Controversies ==
=== 2018 Parti Keadilan Rakyat (PKR) party elections ===
During PKR party elections in 2018, Anwar Ibrahim who has secured the presidency uncontested, hesitated to work with his elected deputy president and preferred on having his own line-up at the national level which led to a bitter contest of two divisive camps: Team Azmin Ali against Team Rafizi Ramli whereby Anwar supported the latter in the party polls. Sarawak PKR was affected too and the division reached its peak when the pro-Team Rafizi Julau PKR division headed by Sng suddenly gained a suspiciously high number of new members from 603 to 13,000 on 26 June. PKR president's support for Julau was obvious when PKR headquarters never took action against the Julau PKR division then.

=== 2022 Parti Bangsa Malaysia (PBM) presidency dispute ===
On 26 May 2022, Zuraida Kamarudin resigned from BERSATU and applied to join PBM. Her membership was approved on 9 June and she was also appointed as the party's president-designate. The decision of the appointment was approved by the party's supreme council. Sng issued a statement on 2 October that he is still the party president and he has not resigned from the position due to the incoming 15th general election.

On 8 October 2022, Zuraida's faction announced that she was the new party president after a meeting was held by the party's supreme council. However, on 26 October, Sng announced that he is the legitimate party president according to the records of the Registrar of Society.

On 2 November, after a meeting between Sng and Zuraida, PBM released a statement that Sng is recognised as the rightful party president.

== Personal life ==
Sng was 27 years old when he married May Ting (born 1977), who was two years his senior, then aged 29, on 14 October 2006. Ting is a political science and economics graduate from the National University of Singapore (NUS) and holds a master's in commerce from an Australian university. She is the eldest daughter of Sarawak business magnate cum construction tycoon, the late Tan Sri Dato' Paduka Ting Pek Khiing (known for his timber business and the Bakun Dam project) and his second wife, Tan Sri Datin Paduka Chai Yu Lan.

Outside politics, Sng is known for his corporate social responsibility (CSR) and community services. He runs the Larry Sng Education Fund which has given over RM1 million to less fortunate students from Pelagus and Bukit Goram areas in his hometown of Kapit to pursue higher education right after leaving school. Sng was once touted as Sarawak's richest MP after he declared his and his wife's assets to be around RM11.78 million to the Malaysian Anti-Corruption Commission (MACC) in November 2018.

== Election results ==
Sarawak State Legislative Assembly
Year	Constituency	Candidate	Votes	Pct	Opponent(s)	Votes	Pct	Ballots cast	Majority	Turnout
2001	N48 Pelagus	Larry Sng Wei Shien (PBDS)	7,418	76.77%	Ling Kok Hong (IND)	1,155	11.95%	9,786	6,263	73.00%
2001	N48 Pelagus	Larry Sng Wei Shien (PBDS)	7,418	76.77%	Jeffery Nuing Ebom (IND)	1,011	10.46%	9,786	6,263	73.00%
2001	N48 Pelagus	Larry Sng Wei Shien (PBDS)	7,418	76.77%	Chua Bee Hun (IND)	40	0.41%	9,786	6,263	73.00%
2001	N48 Pelagus	Larry Sng Wei Shien (PBDS)	7,418	76.77%	Lee Hun Tak (IND)	39	0.40%	9,786	6,263	73.00%
2006	N54 Pelagus	Larry Sng Wei Shien (PRS)	5,965	64.61%	Jeffery Nuing Ebom (IND)	2,726	29.53%	9,401	3,239	67.64%
2006	N54 Pelagus	Larry Sng Wei Shien (PRS)	5,965	64.61%	Simon Sibat (SNAP)	541	5.86%	9,401	3,239	67.64%

Parliament of Malaysia
Year	Constituency	Candidate	Votes	Pct	Opponent(s)	Votes	Pct	Ballots cast	Majority	Turnout
2013	P203 Lubok Antu	Larry Sng Wei Shien (SWP)	4,187	27.92%	William Nyallau Badak (PRS)	8,278	55.21%	15,166	4,091	78.57%
2013	P203 Lubok Antu	Larry Sng Wei Shien (SWP)	4,187	27.92%	Nicholas Bawin Anggat (PKR)	2,530	16.87%	15,166	4,091	78.57%
2018	P209 Julau	Larry Sng Wei Shien (IND)	10,105	55.28%	Joseph Salang Gandum (PRS)	8,174	44.72%	18,569	1,931	73.16%
2022	P209 Julau	Larry Sng Wei Shien (PBM)	9,159	40.64%	Joseph Salang Gandum (PRS)	7,819	34.69%	22,537	1,340	64.67%
2022	P209 Julau	Larry Sng Wei Shien (PBM)	9,159	40.64%	Elly Lawai Ngalai (IND)	5,224	23.18%	22,537	1,340	64.67%
2022	P209 Julau	Larry Sng Wei Shien (PBM)	9,159	40.64%	Susan George (PBDS)	335	1.49%	22,537	1,340	64.67%

== Honours ==
=== Honours of Malaysia ===
- Malaysia
  - Recipient of the 17th Yang di-Pertuan Agong Installation Medal (2024)
- Malacca
  - Companion Class II of the Exalted Order of Malacca (DPSM) – Datuk (2022)

== See also ==
- Julau (federal constituency)
- Pelagus (state constituency)
- Parti Bangsa Malaysia (PBM)
