= Choong Shiau Yoon =

Malaysian politician and accountant (born 1957)

Steven Choong Shiau Yoon
- 锺少云

Member of the Malaysian Parliament for Tebrau
- In office 9 May 2018 – 19 November 2022
- Preceded by: Khoo Soo Seang (BN–MCA)
- Succeeded by: Jimmy Puah Wee Tse (PH–PKR)
- Majority: 30,720 (2018)

Deputy President of the Parti Bangsa Malaysia
- In office 14 February 2023 – 27 September 2026 Serving with Wong Judat
- President: Larry Sng Wei Shien
- Preceded by: Haniza Mohamed Talha

Senior Vice President I of the Parti Bangsa Malaysia
- In office 8 January 2022 – 14 February 2023 Serving with Sivasubramaniam Athinarayanan (Senior Vice President II)
- President: Larry Sng Wei Shien
- Preceded by: Position established
- Succeeded by: Paul Yong Choo Kiong (Senior Vice President)

Division Chief of the People's Justice Party of Tebrau
- In office 2014 – 28 February 2021
- President: Wan Azizah Wan Ismail (2014–2018); Anwar Ibrahim (2018–2021)
- Preceded by: Selva Kumaran
- Succeeded by: Yuneswaran Ramaraj

Division Chief of the People's Justice Party of Ayer Hitam
- In office 2012–2013
- President: Wan Azizah Wan Ismail
- Preceded by: Position established
- Succeeded by: Willham Siau

Deputy Secretary-General of the People's Justice Party
- In office 2011–2014
- President: Wan Azizah Wan Ismail
- Secretary-General: Saifuddin Nasution Ismail

Faction represented in Dewan Rakyat
- 2018–2021: Pakatan Harapan
- 2021: Independent
- 2021–2022: Parti Bangsa Malaysia

Personal details
- Born: Steven Choong Shiau Yoon; 7 December 1957 (age 68) Beruas, Perak, Federation of Malaya (now Malaysia)
- Party: People's Justice Party (PKR) (2007–2021; since 2026); Independent (2021); Parti Bangsa Malaysia (PBM) (2021–2026)
- Other political affiliations: Pakatan Rakyat (PR) (2008–2015); Pakatan Harapan (PH) (2015–2021; since 2026)
- Education: Brunel University London
- Occupation: Politician
- Profession: Accountant

Chinese name
- Traditional Chinese: 鍾少雲
- Simplified Chinese: 锺少云
- Hanyu Pinyin: Zhōng Shǎoyún
- Choong Shiau Yoon on Facebook; Choong Shiau Yoon on Parliament of Malaysia

Steven Choong Shiau Yoon (simplified Chinese: 锺少云; traditional Chinese: 鍾少雲; born 7 December 1957) is a Malaysian politician who served as the Member of Parliament (MP) for Tebrau from May 2018 to November 2022. He is a member of the Parti Bangsa Malaysia (PBM) and was a member of the People's Justice Party (PKR), a component party of the Pakatan Harapan (PH) and formerly Pakatan Rakyat (PR) coalitions. He has served as the Deputy President of PBM since February 2023. He served as the Senior Vice President I of PBM from January 2022 to his promotion to the party deputy presidency in February 2023. He also served as the Division Chief of PKR of Tebrau from 2014 to his resignation from the party in February 2021 and the Division Chief of PKR of Ayer Hitam from 2012 to 2013 as well as the Deputy Secretary-General of PKR from 2011 to 2014. During the 2020–2022 Malaysian political crisis and in February 2021, Choong resigned from PKR and became an independent MP supporting Prime Minister Muhyiddin Yassin and the Perikatan Nasional (PN) coalition along with Julau MP Larry Sng Wei Shien.

== Early life and education ==
Choong was born on 7 December 1957 at Beruas, Perak. He went to Sekolah Menengah Teknik, Ipoh. He graduated with a master's degree in Business Finance at Brunel University London.

== Background ==
Choong has a vast experience as an accountant, auditor, tax agent and business consultant career. He is a Partner at CSY & Associates PLT beside managing director and CEO at CSY Tax Services Sdn. Bhd. He also serves as a Senior Independent Non-Executive Director on the board of Country View Bhd since 27 March 2002. He is also the chairman for Malaysian Institute of Accountants, Chartered Member at Institute of Internal Auditors Malaysia and Member of Association of Chartered Certified Accountants.

== Politics career ==
Choong chose to participate in politics by joining People's Justice Party (PKR) at the age of 50 in 2007. He has been the Division Chairman of both Tebrau and Ayer Hitam and Deputy Secretary-General of PKR. He made his debut contesting the Tebrau parliamentary seat in the 2013 elections but had lost by 1,767 votes to the Malaysian Chinese Association (MCA) candidate. In the 2018 elections, he contested Tebrau under the People's Justice Party banner again in a three-cornered fight and this time won by defeating candidates from the MCA and the Pan-Malaysian Islamic Party (PAS).

On 28 February 2021, he was sacked from PKR to be an independent MP friendly to Prime Minister Muhyiddin Yassin's ruling Perikatan Nasional (PN) coalition together with Larry Sng. The two MPs announced formation of Parti Bangsa Malaysia (PBM) on 19 November 2021.

== Election results ==
Parliament of Malaysia
Year	Constituency	Candidate	Votes	Pct	Opponent(s)	Votes	Pct	Ballots cast	Majority	Turnout
2013	P158 Tebrau	Choong Shiau Yoon (PKR)	38,218	48.87%	Khoo Soo Seang (MCA)	39,985	51.13%	79,835	1,767	88.23%
2018	P158 Tebrau	Choong Shiau Yoon (PKR)	64,535	62.09%	Hou Kok Chung (MCA)	27,310	26.27%	105,420	37,225	85.68%
2018	P158 Tebrau	Choong Shiau Yoon (PKR)	64,535	62.09%	Abdullah Husin (PAS)	12,098	11.64%	105,420	37,225	85.68%

Johor State Legislative Assembly
Year	Constituency	Candidate	Votes	Pct	Opponent(s)	Votes	Pct	Ballots cast	Majority	Turnout
2022	N41 Puteri Wangsa	Choong Shiau Yoon (PBM)	2,471	4.67%	Amira Aisya Abdul Aziz (MUDA)	22,884	43.22%	52,948	7,114	46.94%
2022	N41 Puteri Wangsa	Choong Shiau Yoon (PBM)	2,471	4.67%	Ng Yew Aik (MCA)	15,770	29.78%	52,948	7,114	46.94%
2022	N41 Puteri Wangsa	Choong Shiau Yoon (PBM)	2,471	4.67%	Loh Kah Yong (GERAKAN)	8,957	16.92%	52,948	7,114	46.94%
2022	N41 Puteri Wangsa	Choong Shiau Yoon (PBM)	2,471	4.67%	Khairil Anwar Razali (PEJUANG)	2,468	4.66%	52,948	7,114	46.94%
2022	N41 Puteri Wangsa	Choong Shiau Yoon (PBM)	2,471	4.67%	Adzrin Adam (IND)	398	0.75%	52,948	7,114	46.94%

== See also ==
- Tebrau (federal constituency)
