= Parti Bangsa Malaysia =

Political party of Malaysia

Malaysian Nation Party
- Malay name: Parti Bangsa Malaysia
- Abbreviation: PBM
- President: Larry Sng Wei Shien
- Secretary-General: Munan Anak Laja
- Deputy President: Steven Choong Shiau Yoon; Wong Judat
- Vice President: Mohd Hedrhin Bin Ramli
- Information Chief: Saarah binti Ali Bashah
- Founder: Sng Chee Hua
- Founded: 2012 (as Sarawak Workers Party); 2021 (as Parti Bangsa Malaysia)
- Split from: Sarawak Peoples' Party (PRS) (Sng Chee Hua); People's Justice Party (PKR) (Larry Sng, 2021)
- Preceded by: Sabah People's Front (SPF)
- Headquarters: M-O-2, Pusat Perdagangan Kuchai Lama, Jalan 1/127, Off Jalan Klang Lama, 58200 Kuala Lumpur, Malaysia
- Youth wing: Pergerakan Pemuda Parti Bangsa Malaysia
- Women's wing: Pergerakan Wanita Parti Bangsa Malaysia
- Ideology: Multiracialism; Civic nationalism
- Political position: Centre-right
- National affiliation: Unity Government (since 2022) (Note: The party was part of Gabungan Anak Sarawak (2020–2021) and was aligned with Perikatan Nasional (2021–2022) and Barisan Nasional (2013–2016, 2021–2022))
- Colours: Purple; White
- Anthem: Majulah Bangsa Malaysia
- Dewan Negara: 0 / 70
- Dewan Rakyat: 1 / 222
- Dewan Undangan Negeri: 0 / 612
- Chief ministers in Malaysia (Menteri Besar & Chief Minister): 0 / 13

Parti Bangsa Malaysia (Malay for Malaysian Nation Party abbrev: PBM) is a political party in Malaysia. The party was known as the Sarawak Workers Party until 2021, and as the Sabah People's Front until 2012.

It has one Member of Parliament (MP), party president Larry Sng.

== History ==
=== Early history ===
The party was initially known as the Sabah People's Front, founded in 2010 as a successor to the Federated Sabah People's Front (BERSEKUTU) by Berman Angkap.

It was renamed the Sarawak Workers Party (SWP) following a takeover by former Sarawak Peoples' Party (PRS) members in 2012. The party's inaugural president was Larry Sng, a former assistant minister under Abdul Taib Mahmud. Larry's father, businessman and politician Sng Chee Hua, was reported to be the party's primary backer.

The party branded itself Barisan Nasional (BN)-friendly, but later opened itself to co-operation with the Pakatan Rakyat opposition coalition, including possibly becoming a member.

In the 2013 general election, the party announced its intention to stand only in seats held by the Sarawak Peoples' Party, but denied any vendetta against it.

In 2016, Larry announced that he would be resigning as SWP president ahead of the 2016 Sarawak state election, in which he was set to contest.

Under Engga Unchat's leadership, the party formed Gabungan Anak Sarawak (GASAK) with the Sarawak People's Aspiration Party (ASPIRASI) and New Sarawak Native People's Party (PBDSB) in 2020.

=== As Parti Bangsa Malaysia ===
The party was renamed Parti Bangsa Malaysia (PBM) and registered as a national-level party on 27 October 2021, with new leadership elected on 14 November, including party president Mohamad Sukri Yusri. Larry, who had been elected Member of Parliament (MP) for Julau as an independent in 2018, was named deputy president. It declared its support for Gabungan Parti Sarawak (GPS) during the 2021 Sarawak state election, and supported the Ismail Sabri cabinet in parliament.

Larry was elected president during an extraordinary general meeting on 8 January 2022, which also elected a new leadership line-up that included a number of elected representatives who were former members of other parties; Leong Cheok Keng, Paul Yong Choo Kiong, Sivasubramaniam Athinarayanan, formerly of the Democratic Action Party (DAP), and Haniza Talha, Daroyah Alwi, and Choong Shiau Yoon, formerly of the People's Justice Party (PKR). The party also announced its intention to become a member of Barisan Nasional.

The party was joined by Zuraida Kamaruddin, the Minister of Plantation Industries and Commodities, in June 2022 whereupon she became the party's president-designate. Her membership was preceded by a non-governmental organisation associated with her and her ministry joining the party en masse in December 2021. In August 2022, MP Mohamaddin Ketapi joined the party, followed by deputy tourism minister Edmund Santhara and MP Xavier Jayakumar in October, which gave the party a total of six representatives in parliament. Also in August, the party announced that it and Parti Kuasa Rakyat would co-operate, and that the possible dissolution and merger of Parti Kuasa Rakyat into the party would be discussed. Ultimately, no decision was made to this effect.

A leadership dispute began in October 2022, after the party's information chief announced that Zuraida had been elected president at its annual general assembly. Larry initially challenged the appointment, but was later quoted as saying he would accept the decision. However, with his name still recorded as the party's president by the state registrar, he reversed his position and suspended Zuraida, the party's secretary-general, information chief, and 10 other supreme council members. (Note: Daroyah Alwi, Haniza Mohamad Talha, Rahimah Majid, Sathiskumar Govindaraju, Muhammad Saiful Bahari Sahari, Na’im Brundage, Abdul Aziz Abdul Kadir, Zakaria Abdul Rahim, Muniraa Abu Bakar, Chua Lian Chye, Roger Tan and Albakri Salim) The dispute was temporarily set aside for the 2022 general election. In that election, the party contested five parliamentary seats (Hulu Selangor, Kapar, Labuan, Ampang and Julau) and two state assembly seats (Tronoh and Bugaya). Larry was returned as the party's sole MP in Julau. Subsequently, Zuraida and 10 other members of the party's supreme council were expelled. A judicial review filed by Zuraida was rejected by the High Court. Following the election, the party supported the formation of and joined the Anwar Ibrahim cabinet, colloquially referred to as the unity government. It was not afforded a ministerial position.

Sarawak Workers Party symbol employed from 2012 to 2021.

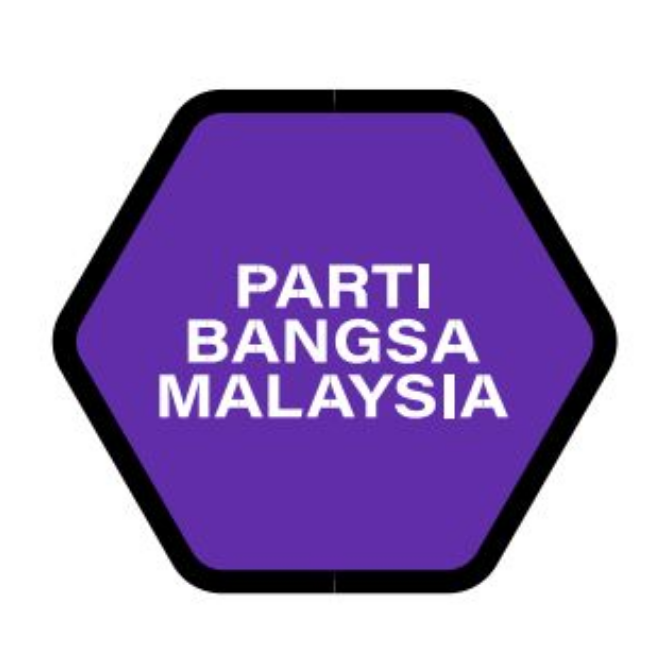
Interm symbol used by the party in 2021

On 14 February 2023, Sng announced a new supreme council line-up for the party, including former Sri Aman MP Masir Kujat as the new party secretary general. On 14 June, Sng announced that PBM will not contest in any of the 6 states involved in 2023 Malaysian state elections, instead supporting candidates fielded by the parties in the unity government, despite being the incumbent in two seats in Selangor. Nor did it contest in the 2025 Sabah state election.

On 2 October 2026, prominent human rights lawyer and activist Siti Kasim announced that she has joined the party. She said that while she has joined a political party for the first time, she will remain independent.

== List of PBM presidents ==
No.	Name	Term of office		Time in office
1	Larry Sng Wei Shien	8 January 2022	Incumbent	4 years, 315 days

== PBM state chairman ==
- PBM Kelantan: Nor Aniza
- PBM Penang: Enson Neoh Gim Khoon
- PBM Perak: Azhari Hamid
- PBM Selangor: Mohd Hedrhin bin Ramli
- PBM Negeri Sembilan: Dato Haji Baha
- PBM Johor: Steven Choong Shiau Yoon
- PBM Sabah: Jupperi Lenson
- PBM Sarawak: Larry Sng Wei Shien

== PBM leadership structure (2024-2027) ==
- President:
  - Larry Sng
- Deputy President:
  - Choong Shiau Yoon
  - Wong Judat
- Senior Vice President:
  - Jupperi Lenson
- Vice President:
  - Mohd Hedrhin Ramli
- Secretary General:
  - Munan Laja
- Deputy Secretary General:
  - Jenny Chiew
- Information Chief:
  - Saarah Ali Bashah
- Deputy Information Chief:
  - Krishna Govinth
- Treasurer Chief:
  - Engga Unchat
- Women Chief:
  - Agnes Padan
- Youth Chief:
  - Muhamad Hanis Asmui Md Salleh
- Supreme Council Members:
  - David Munan
  - Jubin Hilton Muda
  - Lavenia Mawas Munan
  - Mohd Yusof Abdullah
  - Engdawie Entingi
  - Johen @ Joehan Gipin
  - Sabahedin Sambikin
  - Darinsing Gohan
  - Aduros Gampangang
  - Judin Tingih
  - Loning Tokuyuk @ Fredoline
  - Dato' Haji Baharudin Abdullah
  - Khairul Azhar Yacob
  - Richard Dompok
  - Jayvin Pandher

== Elected representatives ==
=== Dewan Negara (Senate) ===
==== Senators ====
- His Majesty's appointee:

=== Dewan Rakyat (House of Representatives) ===
==== Members of Parliament of the 15th Malaysian Parliament ====
PBM has 1 member in the House of Representatives:

State	No.	Parliament Constituency	Member	Party
Sarawak	P209	Julau	Larry Sng	PBM
Total	Sarawak (1)			

=== Dewan Undangan Negeri (State Legislative Assembly) ===
==== Malaysian State Assembly Representatives ====
Selangor State Legislative Assembly
0 / 56
Penang State Legislative Assembly
0 / 40
Negeri Sembilan State Legislative Assembly
0 / 36
Kedah State Legislative Assembly
0 / 36
Johor State Legislative Assembly
0 / 56
Perak State Legislative Assembly
0 / 59
Perlis State Legislative Assembly
0 / 15
Pahang State Legislative Assembly
0 / 42
Sabah State Legislative Assembly
0 / 79
Sarawak State Legislative Assembly
0 / 82
Malacca State Legislative Assembly
0 / 28
Kelantan State Legislative Assembly
0 / 45
Terengganu State Legislative Assembly
0 / 33

The party currently has no representative in any Malaysia State Assembly.

== Government offices ==
=== State governments ===
At its height PBM supported the BN government in Perak and GRS in Sabah and opposed the PH government of Selangor, only to lose them through state election and defections.

- Perak (2022)
- Sabah (2022)

Note: bold as Menteri Besar/Chief Minister, italic as junior partner

== General election results ==
Election	Total seats won	Seats contested	Total votes	Voting Percentage	Outcome of election	Election leader
2013 (as SWP)	0 / 222	6	15,630	0.14%	; No representation in Parliament	Larry Sng
2018 (as SWP)	Did not contest					
2022	1 / 222	5	16,437	0.11%	▲1 seat; Governing coalition (allied with Pakatan Harapan, Barisan Nasional, Gabungan Parti Sarawak and Gabungan Rakyat Sabah)	Larry Sng

== State election results ==
State assembly	Election	Votes	%	Seats	Won/contested	+/–	Position	Status
Perlis	2022	Did not contest						No seats
Kedah	2023	Did not contest						No seats
Kelantan	2023	Did not contest						No seats
Terengganu	2023	Did not contest						No seats
Penang	2023	Did not contest						No seats
Perak	2022	710	0.0	0 / 59	0 / 1	Steady	6th	No seats
Pahang	2022	Did not contest						No seats
Selangor	2023	Did not contest						No seats
Negeri Sembilan	2026	Did not contest						No seats
Malacca	2026	Did not contest						No seats
Johor	2026	Did not contest						No seats
Sabah	2025	213	0.0	0 / 73	0 / 3	Steady	▲19th	No seats
Sarawak	2021	Did not contest						No seats

State election	State Legislative Assembly													
State election	Perlis	Kedah	Kelantan	Terengganu	Penang	Perak	Pahang	Selangor	Negeri Sembilan	Malacca	Johor	Sabah	Sarawak	Total won / Total contested
2/3 majority	2 / 3	2 / 3	2 / 3	2 / 3	2 / 3	2 / 3	2 / 3	2 / 3	2 / 3	2 / 3	2 / 3	2 / 3	2 / 3	
2022											0 / 56			0 / 4
2022						0 / 59								0 / 1
2025												0 / 73		0 / 3

== See also ==
- Politics of Malaysia
- List of political parties in Malaysia
- Barisan Nasional
- Gabungan Parti Sarawak
- Perikatan Nasional
