= Parti Bansa Dayak Sarawak Baru =

Political party of Malaysia

Parti Bansa Dayak Sarawak Sarawak Native People's Party
- Abbreviation: PBDS
- President: John Brian Anthony
- Secretary-General: Sanjan Daik
- Deputy President: Bernard Tahim
- Vice Presidents: Bego Sepop; Peter Asut; Puso Bujang; Muhammad Syafiq Thomas @ Thomas Bukan; Bayang Teron; Kipli Ayom
- Founded: 28 August 2013
- Split from: Parti Bansa Dayak Sarawak (PBDS)
- Headquarters: Sibu, Sarawak
- Ideology: Dayak nationalism Self determination Social democracy National reformism National liberalism
- Political position: Centre-left
- National affiliation: Gabungan Anak Sarawak (2018–2022); PBK and PSB (2022–2024); PH Sarawak (since 2026)
- Slogan: Agi Idup, Agi Ngelaban (2013–2021); Dayak Diutamakan (Dayak First) (2022–now)
- Dewan Negara: 0 / 4 (Sarawak only)
- Dewan Rakyat: 0 / 31 (Sarawak seats)
- Sarawak State Legislative Assembly: 0 / 151
- Premier of Sarawak: 0 / 1 (Sarawak only)

Website
- www.pbdsmalaysia.org

The Sarawak Native People's Party (Malay: Parti Bansa Dayak Sarawak Baru), legally known as Parti Bansa Dayak Sarawak (abbreviated PBDS) is a centre-left political party based in Sarawak, Malaysia. Its registration was approved by the Registrar of Society (RoS) on 28 August 2013.

PBDS Baru was to contest 5 Dayak-majority seats in the 2016 Sarawak state election.

PBDS Baru ahead of the 2018 general election had chosen the pig character as its mascot in which the animal has a deep meaning in the Dayak custom and symbolises the unity of the various Dayak tribes in Sarawak. The party only accepts members from the Dayak ethnicity.

PBDS Baru was deregistered by the RoS on 11 June 2019 for failing to submit its annual returns for the years 2014 to 2017 which was supposedly done by the out-going office bearers lost in party election. The party however has its registration reinstated on 6 August 2020 by the Home Ministry following an appeal by the newly elected party leaders.

PBDS Baru contested 2021 Sarawak election under Gabungan Anak Sarawak (GASAK) coalition with Sarawak People's Aspiration Party (Aspirasi) and Sarawak Workers Party (SWP). In the election to Dewan Rakyat in 2022, it switched allegiance to Parti Bumi Kenyalang and Parti Sarawak Bersatu.

The current PBDS party leadership is led by Dr. John Brian Anthony, following the party’s triennial delegates conference (TDC) in 2025.

== PBDS Leadership Structure (2025–2028) ==
=== PBDS Supreme Leaders Council ===
- Permanent Chairman:
  - Leighton Manjah
- President:
  - Dr. John Brian Anthony
- Deputy President:
  - Dr. Bernard Tahim
- Vice-Presidents:
  - Dr. Bego Sepop
  - Peter Asut
  - Puso Bujang
  - Dr. Muhammad Syafiq Thomas @ Thomas Bukan
  - Dr. Bayang Teron
  - Kipli Ayom
- Secretary-General:
  - Sanjan Daik
- Deputy Secretary-General:
  - Saging Alut
- Treasurer-General:
  - Kambi Rigong
- Deputy Treasurer-General:
  - Petrus Simon Awan @ Peterson
- Information Chief:
  - Sigie Badang
- Deputy Information Chief:
  - Lee Ramsay Richard Will
- Internal Auditor:
  - Nicholas Ayu
- Legal Advisor:
  - Alpha Veronica Dragam
- Organising Secretary:
- Director of Communications:
- Director of Electoral Strategies:
- Central Committee Members:
  - Lemada Ungrol
  - Lalai Kawang
  - Lasanda Alik
  - Muking Amut
  - Ambun Nyanggah
  - Arundi Ganjoh
  - Dennis Benggau
  - Michael Samuel
  - Saligie Nyandang
  - Derik Wat
  - Robert Sitting
  - Aina Duod
  - Norfadzillah Abdullah @ Mimi Stephens
  - Elia Unggak
  - Susanna @ Timah Umchat
  - Umie Lau

=== PBDS Pemuda Wing (Pemuda PBDS) ===
- Pemuda Chief:
  - Jerry Robert
- Deputy Pemuda Chief(s):
- Vice Pemuda Chief(s):
- Pemuda Secretary:
- Pemuda Organising Secretary:
- Pemuda Treasurer:
- Pemuda Information Chief:
- Pemuda Communications Strategy Chief:
- Pemuda Electoral Strategy Chief:
- Pemuda Committee Members:

=== PBDS Women's Wing (Wanita PBDS) ===
- Women's Chief:
  - Marilyn Mitsui Sogep
- Deputy Women's Chief(s):
- Vice-Women's Chief(s):
- Women's Secretary:
- Women's Treasurer:
- Women's Information Chief:
- Women's Electoral Strategy Chief:
- Women's Committee Members:

=== PBDS Youth's Wing (Belia PBDS) ===
- PBDS Youth Chief:
- Deputy Youth Chief(s):
- Vice Youth Chief(s):
- Secretary:
- Organising Secretary:
- Treasurer:
- PBDS Youth Information Chief:
- Communications Strategy Chief:
- Electoral Strategy Chief:
- PBDS Youth Committee Members:

== General election result ==
| Election | Total seats won | Seats contested | Total votes | Voting Percentage | Outcome of election | Election leader |
|---|---|---|---|---|---|---|
| 2018 | 0 / 222 | 19 | 538 | 0.00% | 0 seat; No representation in Parliament (GAGAS) | Cobbold John Lusoi |
| 2022 | 0 / 222 | 3 | 3,053 | 0.02% | 0 seat; No representation in Parliament (PERKASA) | Bobby anak William |

== State election results ==
Sarawak State Legislative Assembly
| Election | Votes | | Seats | | | Position (Note: As part of electoral coalition.) | Status |
| Election | Count | % | Result | Won / contested | +/– | Position | Status |
|---|---|---|---|---|---|---|---|
| 2016 | 1,244 | 0.2 | 0 / 82 | 0 / 11 | Steady | 5th | No seats |
| 2021 | 2,972 | 0.4 | 0 / 82 | 0 / 11 | Steady | 5th (Gabungan Anak Sarawak) | No seats |

== Candidates in the Sarawak state election ==
- Parti Bansa Dayak Sarawak Baru candidates, 2016 Sarawak state election

== See also ==
- Politics of Malaysia
- List of political parties in Malaysia
