= Subang (federal constituency) =

Federal constituency of Selangor, Malaysia

Subang (P104)
Selangor constituency

Federal constituency
- Legislature: Dewan Rakyat
- MP: Vacant
- Constituency created: 1994
- First contested: 1995
- Last contested: 2022

Demographics
- Population (2020): 478,154
- Electors (2023): 235,752
- Area (km²): 69
- Pop. density (per km²): 6,929.8

Subang is a federal constituency in Petaling District, Selangor, Malaysia, that has been represented in the Dewan Rakyat since 1995.

The federal constituency was created from parts of the Shah Alam constituency in the 1994 redistribution and is mandated to return a single member to the Dewan Rakyat under the first past the post voting system.

== Demographics ==
https://live.chinapress.com.my/ge15/2023election/Selangor

Ethnic breakdown of Subang's electorate as of 2023
1. Chinese (54.1%)
2. Malay (26.2%)
3. Indian (16.7%)
4. Other ethnicities (2.94%)
Age breakdown of Subang's electorate as of 2023
1. 18-20 (6.61%)
2. 21-29 (21.4%)
3. 30-39 (20.1%)
4. 40-49 (17.6%)
5. 50-59 (16.4%)
6. 60-69 (12.1%)
7. 70-79 (4.52%)
8. 80-89 (1.13%)
9. above 90 (0.13%)
Gender breakdown of Subang's electorate as of 2023
1. Male (49.4%)
2. Female (50.6%)

== History ==
=== Polling districts ===
According to the federal gazette issued on 18 July 2023, the Subang constituency is divided into 49 polling districts.

State constituency	Polling Districts	Code	Location
Kinrara (N30)	Kinrara Seksyen 4, 5 & 6	104/30/01	Sekolah KAFA Integrasi An-Najah
Kinrara (N30)	Kinrara Seksyen 2	104/30/02	SJK (C) Yak Chee
Kinrara (N30)	Kinrara Seksyen 1	104/30/03	SJK (C) Yak Chee
Kinrara (N30)	Kinrara Seksyen 7	104/30/04	SK Bukit Kuchai
Kinrara (N30)	Kinrara Seksyen 3	104/30/05	Kolej Tingkatan Enam Puchong
Kinrara (N30)	Puchong Jaya Timur	104/30/06	SMK Bandar Puchong Jaya (B)
Kinrara (N30)	Puchong Jaya Utara	104/30/07	SMK Bandar Puchong Jaya (A)
Kinrara (N30)	Puchong Jaya Barat	104/30/08	SK Puchong Jaya
Kinrara (N30)	Batu 12 Puchong	104/30/09	SJK (T) Castlefield
Kinrara (N30)	Batu 7 Jalan Puchong	104/30/10	SJK (C) Yak Chee
Kinrara (N30)	Batu 13 Puchong	104/30/11	SK Puchong Jalan Masjid Bt.14 Puchong
Kinrara (N30)	Bandar Kinrara Seksyen 1	104/30/12	SMK Seksyen 1 Bandar Kinrara
Kinrara (N30)	Pusat Bandar Puchong	104/30/13	SK Pusat Bandar Puchong (2); SJK (C) Kheng Chee
Kinrara (N30)	Bandar Kinrara Seksyen 2	104/30/14	SK Seksyen 1 Bandar Kinrara
Kinrara (N30)	Bandar Kinrara Seksyen 3	104/30/15	SK Seksyen 2 Bandar Kinrara
Kinrara (N30)	Bandar Kinrara Seksyen 4	104/30/16	SMK Seksyen 3 Bandar Kinrara
Kinrara (N30)	Bandar Kinrara Seksyen 5	104/30/17	SMK Seksyen 4 Bandar Kinrara; SMK Puncak Jalil
Kinrara (N30)	Bandar Puteri	104/30/18	SMK Pusat Bandar Puchong (1)
Kinrara (N30)	Puchong Indah 1	104/30/19	SK Puchong Indah
Kinrara (N30)	Puchong Perdana 1	104/30/20	KAFA Integrasi Madrasatul-Ikhwan
Kinrara (N30)	Puchong Perdana 2	104/30/21	SK Puchong Perdana
Kinrara (N30)	Puchong Indah 2	104/30/22	SK Puchong Perdana
Kinrara (N30)	Puchong Intan	104/30/23	SK Puchong Indah
Subang Jaya (N31)	PJS 7 Bandar Sunway	104/31/01	SMK Bandar Sunway
Subang Jaya (N31)	SS 12	104/31/02	Sekolah Sri Kuala Lumpur
Subang Jaya (N31)	SS 15	104/31/03	Sekolah Islam Darul Ehsan
Subang Jaya (N31)	SS 16 & SS 17	104/31/04	SMK SS17
Subang Jaya (N31)	SS 19/1	104/31/05	SK Perdana Jaya SS19
Subang Jaya (N31)	SS 18	104/31/06	SMK Subang Utama
Subang Jaya (N31)	SS 14/1-4	104/31/07	SK Subang Jaya
Subang Jaya (N31)	SS 13	104/31/08	SMK Subang Jaya
Subang Jaya (N31)	USJ 1	104/31/09	SJK (C) Chee Wen
Subang Jaya (N31)	USJ 2/1-4	104/31/10	SK USJ2
Subang Jaya (N31)	USJ 3	104/31/11	SK Seri Selangor
Subang Jaya (N31)	USJ 4	104/31/12	SMK USJ4
Subang Jaya (N31)	USJ 5	104/31/13	SMA Bestari
Subang Jaya (N31)	USJ 6	104/31/14	SK Seafield
Subang Jaya (N31)	USJ 7 & 8	104/31/15	SMK USJ8
Subang Jaya (N31)	USJ 9 & USJ 10	104/31/16	SK Seafield 3
Subang Jaya (N31)	USJ 11	104/31/17	SMK USJ12
Subang Jaya (N31)	USJ 12	104/31/18	SK USJ12
Subang Jaya (N31)	USJ 13	104/31/19	SMK USJ13
Subang Jaya (N31)	USJ 14 & 15	104/31/20	Kompleks Sekolah Wawasan SK Dato Onn Jaafar
Subang Jaya (N31)	SS 19/2 – SS 19/5	104/31/21	SK SS19
Subang Jaya (N31)	SS 19/6 – SS 19/19	104/31/22	SJK (C) Lick Hung
Subang Jaya (N31)	PJS 9 & 11 Bandar Sunway	104/31/23	SK Bandar Sunway
Subang Jaya (N31)	SS 14/5-8	104/31/24	SK Sri Subang Jaya
Subang Jaya (N31)	USJ 2/5-7	104/31/25	SMK Seafield
Subang Jaya (N31)	USJ 16 until 22	104/31/26	SK USJ20

=== Representation history ===
Members of Parliament for Subang
Parliament	No	Years	Member	Party	Vote Share
Constituency created from Selayang, Puchong, Shah Alam and Petaling Jaya
9th	P097	1995–1999	M. Mahalingam (எம்.மஹாலிங்கம்)	BN (MIC)	37,247; 76.43%
10th	P097	1999–2004	Karnail Singh Nijhar (ਕਰਨੈਲ ਸਿੰਘ ਨੇਜਾਰ)	BN (MIC)	36,157; 55.49%
11th	P107	2004–2008	Karnail Singh Nijhar (ਕਰਨੈਲ ਸਿੰਘ ਨੇਜਾਰ)	BN (MIC)	32,941; 65.33%
12th	P107	2008–2013	Sivarasa Rasiah (சிவராசா ராசையா)	PR (PKR)	35,024; 55.30%
13th	P107	2013–2015	Sivarasa Rasiah (சிவராசா ராசையா)	PR (PKR)	66,268; 59.73%
13th	P107	2015–2018	Sivarasa Rasiah (சிவராசா ராசையா)	PH (PKR)	66,268; 59.73%
14th	P104	2018–2022¹	Wong Chen (黄基全)	PH (PKR)	104,430; 83.08%
15th	P104	2022–2026	Wong Chen (黄基全)	PH (PKR)	138,259; 77.68%
15th	P104	2026–present	Vacant		

Note: ^{1}Noted that in 2018 redelineation exercise this Subang constituency is now shifted south to Subang Jaya city centre from former Kelana Jaya constituency, not Subang, Selangor in Shah Alam where the Subang Skypark located which now renamed as Sungai Buloh.

=== State constituency ===
Parliamentary constituency	State constituency						
Parliamentary constituency	1955–59*	1959–1974	1974–1986	1986–1995	1995–2004	2004–2018	2018–present
Subang					Bukit Lanjan		
Subang					Kelana Jaya		
Subang							Kinrara
Subang						Kota Damansara	
Subang						Paya Jaras	
Subang					Subang Jaya		Subang Jaya

=== Historical boundaries ===
State Constituency	Area		
State Constituency	1994	2003	2018
Bukit Lanjan	Kayu Ara; Kota Damansara; PJU6 - 10; Subang; Tropicana	Bandar Utama; Bukit Lanjan; Kayu Ara; PJU6 - 10; Tropicana	
Kelana Jaya	Bukit Jelutong; Glenmarie; PJS5 - 6, 8 & 10; Seksyen 13 Shah Alam; SS4 - 11		
Kinrara			Bandar Puteri; Kinrara; Puchong Jaya; Puchong Perdana; Taman Perindustrian Puchong
Kota Damansara		Ara Damansara; Kampung Baru Sungai Buloh; Kampung Melayu Subang; Kota Damansara; Subang	
Paya Jaras		Desa Impian; Elmina; Paya Jaras; Sungai Buloh; Taman Ehsan	
Subang Jaya	Batu Tiga; Kampung Tengah; PJS7, 9 & 11; SS14 - 19; USJ1 - 21		Bandar Sunway; PJS7, 9 & 11; SS14 - 19; Subang Mewah; USJ1 - 21

=== Current state assembly members ===
No.	State Constituency	Member	Coalition (Party)
N30	Kinrara	Ng Sze Han	PH (DAP)
N31	Subang Jaya	Michelle Ng Mei Sze	PH (DAP)

=== Local governments & postcodes ===
No.	State Constituency	Local Government	Postcode
N30	Kinrara	Subang Jaya City Council	47100, 47140, 47160, 47170, 47180, 47190 Puchong; 47500, 47600, 47610, 47620, 47630, 47640 Subang Jaya
N31	Subang Jaya	Subang Jaya City Council	47100, 47140, 47160, 47170, 47180, 47190 Puchong; 47500, 47600, 47610, 47620, 47630, 47640 Subang Jaya

== Election results ==
Malaysian general election, 2022
Party	Candidate	Votes	%	∆%
PH	Wong Chen	138,259	77.68	▲77.68
PN	Ang Hiang Ni	21,185	13.03	▲13.03
BN	Kow Siong Wai	16,539	9.29	▼0.32
Total valid votes		177,983	100.00	
Total rejected ballots		938		
Unreturned ballots		657		
Turnout		179,578	77.07	▼9.59
Registered electors		230,490		
Majority		115,074	64.65	▼8.82
PH hold		Swing		
Source(s) https://lom.agc.gov.my/ilims/upload/portal/akta/outputp/1753283/PUB612.pdf

Malaysian general election, 2018
Party	Candidate	Votes	%	∆%
PKR	Wong Chen	104,430	83.08	▲23.35
BN	Tan Seong Lim	12,077	9.61	▼26.04
PAS	Mohd Shahir Mohd Adnan²	9,025	7.18	▲7.18
Independent	Toh Sin Wah	173	0.14	▲0.14
Total valid votes		125,705	100.00	
Total rejected ballots		610		
Unreturned ballots		568		
Turnout		126,883	86.66	▼1.20
Registered electors		146,422		
Majority		92,353	73.47	▲49.39
PKR hold		Swing		
Source(s) "His Majesty's Government Gazette - Notice of Contested Election, Parliament for the State of Selangor [P.U. (B) 239/2018]" (PDF). Attorney General's Chambers of Malaysia. 3 May 2018. Archived from the original (PDF) on 2019-07-19. "Federal Government Gazette - Results of Contested Election and Statements of the Poll after the Official Addition of Votes, Parliamentary Constituencies for the State of Selangor [P.U. (B) 313/2018]" (PDF). Attorney General's Chambers of Malaysia. 28 May 2018. Archived from the original (PDF) on 2019-07-19.

Note: ^{2}Mohd Shahir Mohd Adnan was a candidate of Malaysia National Alliance Party (IKATAN), who had contested under the PAS banner through the Gagasan Sejahtera pact.

Malaysian general election, 2013
Party	Candidate	Votes	%	∆%
PKR	Sivarasa K. Rasiah	66,268	59.73	▲4.43
BN	Pakas Rao Applanaidoo	39,549	35.65	▼9.05
Pan-Malaysian Islamic Front	Mohamad Ismail	4,454	4.01	▲4.01
Independent	Nazaruddin Mohamed Ferdoos	460	0.41	▲0.41
Independent	Edros Abdullah	218	0.20	▲0.20
Total valid votes		110,949	100.00	
Total rejected ballots		1,669		
Unreturned ballots		319		
Turnout		112,937	87.86	▲9.84
Registered electors		128,543		
Majority		26,719	24.08	▲13.48
PKR hold		Swing		
Source(s) "Federal Government Gazette - Notice of Contested Election, Parliament for the State of Selangor [P.U. (B) 176/2013]" (PDF). Attorney General's Chambers of Malaysia. 26 April 2013. "Federal Government Gazette - Results of Contested Election and Statements of the Poll after the Official Addition of Votes, Parliamentary Constituencies for the State of Selangor [P.U. (B) 217/2013]" (PDF). Attorney General's Chambers of Malaysia. 22 May 2013.

Malaysian general election, 2008
Party	Candidate	Votes	%	∆%
PKR	Sivarasa K. Rasiah	35,024	55.30	▲20.63
BN	Murugesan Sinnandavar	28,315	44.70	▼20.63
Total valid votes		63,339	100.00	
Total rejected ballots		2,079		
Unreturned ballots		443		
Turnout		65,861	78.02	▲2.35
Registered electors		84,414		
Majority		6,709	10.60	▼20.06
PKR gain from BN		Swing		?

Malaysian general election, 2004
Party	Candidate	Votes	%	∆%
BN	Karnail Singh Nijhar Amar Singh	32,941	65.33	▲9.84
PKR	Mohd Nasir Hashim	17,481	34.67	▼9.84
Total valid votes		50,422	100.00	
Total rejected ballots		1,063		
Unreturned ballots		532		
Turnout		52,017	75.67	▲2.56
Registered electors		68,739		
Majority		15,460	30.66	▼42.45
BN hold		Swing		

Malaysian general election, 1999
Party	Candidate	Votes	%	∆%
BN	Karnail Singh Nijhar Amar Singh	36,137	55.49	▼20.94
PKR	Irene Fernandez	28,985	44.51	▲44.51
Total valid votes		65,122	100.00	
Total rejected ballots		1,509		
Unreturned ballots		1,216		
Turnout		67,847	73.11	▲2.85
Registered electors		92,737		
Majority		7,152	10.98	▼41.88
BN hold		Swing		

Malaysian general election, 1995
Party	Candidate	Votes	%
BN	M. Mahalingam Muthukrishnan	37,247	76.43
S46	Usulludin Jamil	11,484	23.57
Total valid votes		48,731	100.00
Total rejected ballots		2,142	
Unreturned ballots		1,028	
Turnout		51,901	70.26
Registered electors		73,868	
Majority		25,763	52.86
This was a new constituency created out of Shah Alam which went to BN in the previous election.
