= Hannah Yeoh =

Malaysian politician and lawyer (born 1979)

Yang Berhormat Puan Hannah Yeoh MP
- 杨巧双
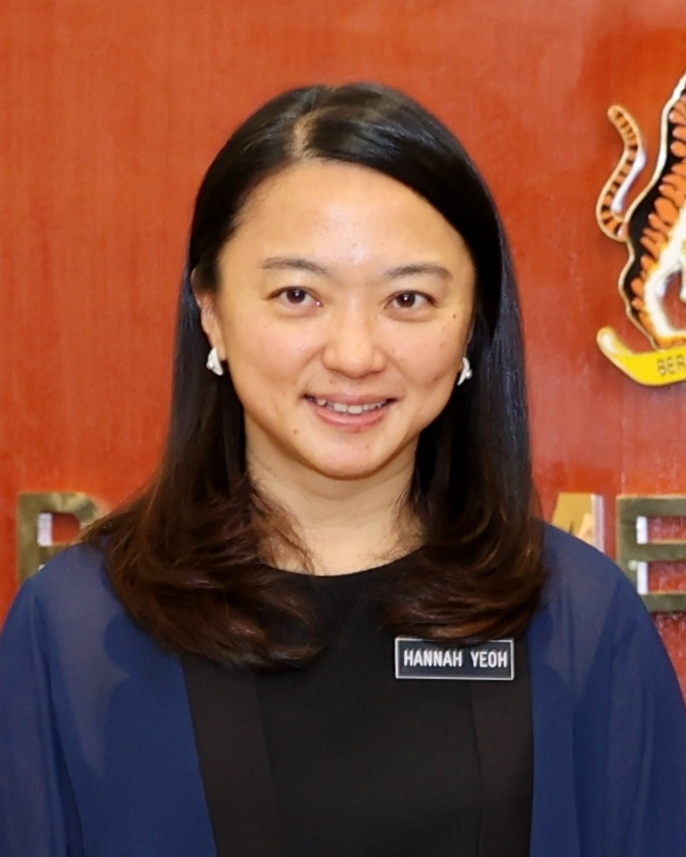
- Yeoh in 2023

Minister in the Prime Minister's Department (Federal Territories)
- Incumbent
- Assumed office 17 December 2025
- Monarch: Ibrahim
- Prime Minister: Anwar Ibrahim
- Deputy: Lo Su Fui
- Preceded by: Zaliha Mustafa
- Constituency: Segambut

Minister of Youth and Sports
- In office 3 December 2022 – 17 December 2025
- Monarchs: Abdullah (2022–2024); Ibrahim (2024–2025)
- Prime Minister: Anwar Ibrahim
- Deputy: Adam Adli
- Preceded by: Ahmad Faizal Azumu
- Succeeded by: Mohammed Taufiq Johari

Deputy Minister of Women, Family and Community Development
- In office 2 July 2018 – 24 February 2020
- Monarchs: Muhammad V (2018–2019); Abdullah (2019–2020)
- Prime Minister: Mahathir Mohamad
- Minister: Wan Azizah Wan Ismail
- Preceded by: Azizah Dun (Women and Family Development); Chew Mei Fun (Community Development)
- Succeeded by: Siti Zailah Mohd Yusoff

10th Speaker of the Selangor State Legislative Assembly
- In office 21 June 2013 – 9 April 2018
- Monarch: Sharafuddin
- Deputy: Nik Nazmi Nik Ahmad (2013–2014); Mohd Shafie Ngah (2014–2018)
- Menteri Besar: Khalid Ibrahim (2013–2014); Azmin Ali (2014–2018)
- Preceded by: Teng Chang Khim
- Succeeded by: Ng Suee Lim
Party leadership
Deputy Secretary-General of the Democratic Action Party
Incumbent
Assumed office 16 March 2025 Serving with Steven Sim and Ramkarpal Singh
Secretary-General	Anthony Loke
Preceded by	Sivakumar Varatharaju
Assistant National Publicity Secretary of the Democratic Action Party
In office 20 March 2022 – 16 March 2025 Serving with Ganabatirau Veraman
Secretary-General	Anthony Loke
National Publicity Secretary	Teo Nie Ching
Preceded by	Zairil Khir Johari
Succeeded by	Young Syefura Othman
Parliamentary offices
Member of the Malaysian Parliament for Segambut
Incumbent
Assumed office 9 May 2018
Preceded by	Lim Lip Eng
Majority	45,702 (2018); 59,684 (2022)
Member of the Selangor State Legislative Assembly for Subang Jaya
In office 8 March 2008 – 9 May 2018
Preceded by	Lee Hwa Beng (BN–MCA)
Succeeded by	Michelle Ng Mei Sze (PH–DAP)
Majority	13,851 (2008); 28,069 (2013)

Personal details
- Born: Hannah Yeoh Tseow Suan; 9 January 1979 (age 47) Subang Jaya, Selangor, Malaysia
- Party: Democratic Action Party (since 2006)
- Other political affiliations: Pakatan Rakyat (2008–2015); Pakatan Harapan (2015–present)
- Spouse: Ramachandran Muniandy (m. 2008; div. 2026)
- Children: 2
- Education: University of Tasmania (LLB)
- Occupation: Lawyer; politician
- Website: www.hannahyeoh.com

Chinese name
- Simplified Chinese: 杨巧双
- Traditional Chinese: 楊巧雙
- Hanyu Pinyin: Yáng Qiǎoshuāng
- Hokkien POJ: Iôⁿ Khá-siang

Hannah Yeoh Tseow Suan (Note: simplified Chinese: 杨巧双; traditional Chinese: 楊巧雙; pinyin: Yáng Qiǎoshuāng; Pe̍h-ōe-jī: Iôⁿ Khá-siang. In this Chinese name, the family name is Yeoh (杨). In accordance with custom, the Western-style name is Hannah Yeoh and the Chinese-style name is Yeoh Tseow Suan.) (born 9 January 1979) is a Malaysian politician and lawyer who has served as the Minister in the Prime Minister's Department in charge of the Federal Territories since 2025. She served as the Minister of Youth and Sports from 2022 to 2025. A member of the Democratic Action Party, she was the first female and the youngest speaker serving at the Selangor State Legislative Assembly from 2013 to 2018.

Born in Subang Jaya, Yeoh graduated from University of Tasmania in 2001 with a Bachelor of Laws degree. From 2018 to 2020, she was the Deputy Minister of Women, Family and Community Development under Mahathir Mohamad.

== Early life and education ==
Hannah Yeoh Tseow Suan was born on 9 January 1979 and raised in Subang Jaya, Selangor. She said her name means "coincidentally a pair" or "likely double" in Chinese. Yeoh is the eldest child, and her younger sister Megan was born later in the same year. They were in the same school year and often attended the same classes. Yeoh completed her early education at Sekolah Kebangsaan Subang Jaya and Sekolah Menengah Kebangsaan Subang Utama before earning a Bachelor of Laws at the University of Tasmania in Australia, in 2001.

== Career ==
=== Early career ===
Trained as a lawyer, Yeoh began her career working in Tasmania before returning to Malaysia, where she spent three years at a legal firm in Petaling Jaya. In 2006, she transitioned to the event management industry. Encouraged by her school friend Edward Ling, Yeoh entered politics by joining the Democratic Action Party (DAP) the same year. Just two years later, in the 2008 general election, she won the Subang Jaya state seat with a majority of 13,851 votes, securing 23,459 votes against Barisan Nasional's (BN) Ong Chong Swen, who received 9,608.

=== Speaker of the Selangor State Legislative Assembly ===
On 21 June 2013, at the age of 34, Yeoh was sworn in as the Speaker of the Selangor State Legislative Assembly, becoming Malaysia's youngest and first female state Speaker. During the same ceremony, Nik Nazmi was sworn in as the state's Deputy Speaker. In June 2015, a columnist criticised Yeoh for wearing a headscarf inside a mosque, labelling her an "enemy within" for seemingly betraying the Chinese community. Yeoh responded by defending her choice, emphasising that "respecting the dress code of a place of worship does not equate to disloyalty."

=== 2018 general election ===
In the 2018 general election on 9 May, Yeoh won the Segambut parliamentary seat with 53,124 votes and a majority of 45,702, defeating opponents Loga Bala Mohan and Solleh Ab Razak, who received 7,422 and 4,181 votes respectively. This marked her first term as Segambut's MP, succeeding Lim Lip Eng, with a significantly larger majority than in the previous election. She was succeeded as Speaker by Ng Suee Lim, who was appointed to the position on 26 June 2018.

=== Deputy Minister of Women, Family and Community Development ===
Following her appointment as Deputy Minister of Women, Family and Community Development on 2 July 2018, Yeoh pledged to be a "strong voice for children" in Dewan Rakyat. In February 2019, she announced that the Sexual Harassment Bill would not be tabled in the Dewan Rakyat during the March session as the results of a recently completed feasibility study were still under careful review. In July 2020, police investigations clarified that a seditious post wrongly attributed to Yeoh was actually uploaded by a portal called "muafakatnasional.net", with no involvement from her. Then, in August 2021, Yeoh called on Prime Minister Ismail Sabri Yaakob to urgently establish a dedicated Ministry of Children to better address the critical needs of children in Malaysia.

Yeoh successfully retained her Segambut parliamentary seat in the 2022 general election on 19 November, winning over 80% of the vote with 65,290 votes and a majority of 56,980 against her opponents from Perikatan Nasional–Gerakan and BN–MCA.

=== Minister of Youth and Sports ===
On 3 December 2022, Yeoh was appointed Minister of Youth and Sports in the Anwar Ibrahim cabinet. In January 2024, Universiti Utara Malaysia lecturer Kamarul Zaman Yusoff withdrew his defamation suit against her, with the court ordering him to pay RM5,000 in costs, affirming Yeoh's position that she did not misuse religion in her campaign. However, in 2024, Wan Ahmad Fayhsal criticised Yeoh for a lack of hands-on leadership amid controversies surrounding the Paris 2024 Olympics, stating that despite her limited control over sports associations, she bears ultimate responsibility.

Following the party's leadership reshuffle on 16 March 2025, Yeoh continues to hold a prominent role as one of DAP's deputy secretaries-general. In May 2025, the High Court ruled in her favour in a defamation suit against Kamarul Zaman, ordering him to pay RM400,000 in damages for making false and malicious claims that she was promoting a Christian proselytising agenda through her political platform.

=== Minister for Federal Territories ===
Yeoh left her role as Minister of Youth and Sports and was appointed Minister in the Prime Minister's Department for the Federal Territories in December 2025. She became the first MP from Kuala Lumpur to hold this position in two decades. This was seen as a way to give Kuala Lumpur voters more representation in their government, as their local government is run by the federal government rather than being locally elected. One of Yeoh's early commitments was to seek to secure retention ponds, reducing the risk of flooding.

== Controversy ==
In May 2024, Asia Mobility Technologies Sdn Bhd (Asia Mobiliti), which is co-founded by Yeoh's ex-husband, sparked public debate after being selected by the Selangor state government for a Demand-Responsive Transit (DRT) pilot project through a direct award rather than an open tender. The project, which involved an estimated RM2.16 million in state subsidies per vendor, prompted public scrutiny over potential conflicts of interest because Yeoh serves as a Cabinet minister while both the federal and state governments belong to the same ruling coalition.

== Personal life ==
Yeoh is a Christian. She married Ramachandran Muniandy, CEO of the technology company Asia Mobiliti, and they have two children. In 2011, she attempted to register the race of her child (who has both Chinese and Indian heritage) as ‘anak Malaysia’ but it was rejected by the National Registration Department. Yeoh and Muniandy divorced in 2026 after 18 years of marriage. However, the exact date of their divorcement is undisclosed.

== Election results ==
Selangor State Legislative Assembly
Year	Constituency	Candidate	Votes	Pct	Opponent(s)	Votes	Pct	Ballots cast	Majority	Turnout
2008	N31 Subang Jaya	Hannah Yeoh Tseow Suan (DAP)	23,459	70.94%	Ong Chong Suan (MCA)	9,608	29.06%	33,067	13,851	79.31%
2013	N31 Subang Jaya	Hannah Yeoh Tseow Suan (DAP)	40,366	76.09%	Gan Meng Foo (MCA)	12,297	23.17%	53,052	28,069	86.20%

Parliament of Malaysia
Year	Constituency	Candidate	Votes	Pct	Opponent(s)	Votes	Pct	Ballot cast	Majority	Turnout
2018	P117 Segambut	Hannah Yeoh Tseow Suan (DAP)	53,124	82.07%	Loga Bala Mohan Jaganathan (MyPPP)	7,422	11.47%	77,956	45,702	83.72%
2018	P117 Segambut	Hannah Yeoh Tseow Suan (DAP)	53,124	82.07%	Mohd Solleh Abd Razak (PAS)	4,181	6.46%	77,956	45,702	83.72%
2022	P117 Segambut	Hannah Yeoh Tseow Suan (DAP)	68,438	80.05%	Prabagaran Vythilingam (Gerakan)	8,754	10.24%	85,491	59,684	71.45%
2022	P117 Segambut	Hannah Yeoh Tseow Suan (DAP)	68,438	80.05%	Daniel Ling Sia Chin (MCA)	8,304	9.71%	85,491	59,684	71.45%
