= Murugesan Sinnandavar =

Yang Berbahagia Datuk Murugesan Sinnandavar PJN AMN

Personal details
- Born: 12 December 1967 (age 58) Klang, Selangor, Malaysia
- Party: Malaysian Indian Congress (MIC)
- Other political affiliations: Barisan Nasional (BN); Perikatan Nasional (PN)
- Spouse: Thilaga Kaliaperumal
- Children: 3
- Education: University of London; University of Malaya
- Occupation: Lawyer
- Website: s-murugesan.blogspot.com

Murugesan Sinandavar (born 12 December 1967) is an Indian social activist in the state of Selangor. He is an Advocate & Solicitor, High Court of Malaya by profession and has his own firm Messrs. MurugesanSinnandavar & Associates in Klang, Selangor.

== Personal life ==
Murugesan is married to Thilaga Kaliaperumal, a lawyer by profession. The couple have 3 children Vhimall (23 years old), Dhaanyaa (18 years old) and Tharini (15 years old) (2016).

== Education ==
Murugesan studied in Sekolah Rendah Kebangsaan Simpang Lima, Klang, and continued his secondary education in Sekolah Menengah La Salle and Sekolah Tengku Ampuan Rahimah also in Kelang. Later, he went to the Holborn Law Tutors in London to read law and obtained the London Law Tutor (LLB.Hons) in the year 1990. In 1991, Datuk Murugesan came back to Malaysia and took the Certificate in Legal Practice test at the University of Malaya, Kuala Lumpur. After obtaining a distinction in his Certificate of Legal Practice test, he read in chambers of Datuk L. Rekhraj (a judge in the High Court of Malaya) in the firm Messrs. Syarikat K.L. Rekhraj, Kuala Lumpur from October 1991 to September 1992.9 Months later, he was admitted to the Malaysian Bar. Datuk Murugesan then read and successfully passed Masters of Law (LL.M) while attending University of Malaya in 1999.

== Notable seminar and conference ==
Murugesan participated in the International Academy for Leadership Seminar in Saarbrücken, Germany, which was organised by the Friedrich Naumann Foundation, in 2003.

He is also a frequent participant in the Pravasi Bharatiya Divas, a ceremony to celebrate people of Indian descent overseas. He attended the ceremony in 2004, 2005, 2006, 2007, 2008, 2009, 2011, 2012 and 2013.

He Represented MIC in a national debate entitled “DebatPerdana - Towards Towering Personality of Malaysian Youths” which was televised live. The other notable members of the panel were Ungku Aziz, Datin Paduka, Sharifah Mazlina (the First Malaysian to reach the South Pole) and Tan Seng Giaw (former Deputy President of DAP).

== Political career ==
Murugesan is the Secretary General and also the CWC member of the Malaysian Indian Congress (MIC). He is quite vocal in stating his opinion regarding the party and also the Indian community in Malaysia. His bold statements are well liked by "grass-root" supporters. Datuk Murugesan was chosen by the Barisan Nasional national committee to contest in the Kota Raja parliamentary seat in Klang. Datuk S. Murugesan has resigned as Secretary General of MIC on 14 May 2013. He has recently contested for CWC and won 2nd highest ranking among 23 CWC members. He obtained 970 votes. As a CWC member, Datuk S.Murugesan will work as a team with the party leadership in implementing Indian Economic Transformation Plan and will assist transformation of the party through constitutional amendments.

== Election results ==
Parliament of Malaysia
Year	Constituency	Candidate	Votes	Pct	Opponent(s)	Votes	Pct	Ballots cast	Majority	Turnout
2008	P107 Subang	Murugesan Sinnandavar (MIC)	28,315	42.99%	Sivarasa Rasiah (PKR)	35,024	53.18%	65,861	6,709	78.02%
2013	P111 Kota Raja	Murugesan Sinnandavar (MIC)	29,711	32.43%	Siti Mariah Mahmud (PAS)	59,106	64.51%	92,719	29,395	87.55%

== Honours ==
- Malaysia
  - Commander of the Order of Meritorious Service (PJN) – Datuk (2012)
  - Member of the Order of the Defender of the Realm (AMN) (2003)
