= International Relations and Trade Select Committee =

Committee appointed by the Malaysian House of Representatives

The International Relations and Trade Select Committee (Malay: Jawatankuasa Pilihan Khas Hubungan dan Perdagangan Antarabangsa; Chinese: 馬來西亞國際關係與貿易專責委員會; Tamil: மலேசியா சர்வதேச உறவுகள் மற்றும் வர்த்தக ஆணையம்) is a select committee of the Malaysian House of Representatives, which scrutinises the Ministry of Domestic Trade and Consumer Affairs, Ministry of International Trade and Industry and Ministry of Foreign Affairs. It is among four new bipartisan parliamentary select committees announced by the Minister in the Prime Minister's Department in charge of legal affairs, Liew Vui Keong, on 17 October 2019 in an effort to improve the institutional system.

== Membership ==
=== 14th Parliament ===
As of December 2019, the committee's current members are as follows:

Member	Party	Constituency
Chen Wong MP (chairman)	PKR	Subang
Tajuddin Abdul Rahman MP	UMNO	Pasir Salak
Noor Azmi Ghazali MP	BERSATU	Bagan Serai
Amzad Hashim MP	PAS	Kuala Terengganu
June Hsiad Hui Leow MP	PKR	Hulu Selangor
Oscar Chai Yew Ling MP	DAP	Sibu
Prabakaran Paramesearan MP	PKR	Batu

== Chair of the International Relations and Trade Select Committee ==
Chair	Party	Constituency	First elected	Method
Wong Chen MP	PKR	Subang	5 December 2019	Elected by the Speaker of the House of Representatives

== See also ==
- Parliamentary Committees of Malaysia
