= Abdul Samad Alias =

Malaysian accountant

Tan Sri Abdul Samad bin Alias is one of the key figures that had contributed to the development of the accountancy profession in Malaysia. He recently completed his term as the vice-president of the Malaysian Institute of Accountants and served as the 4th President in 2000 until 2005. He is the first Malaysian who served the International Federation of Accountants (IFAC) board from 2005 to 2007.

In addition to his involvement in the accountancy profession, Datuk Abdul Samad also serves a number of government links corporations in various capacities. Presently, he chairs the boards of Bank Pembangunan Malaysia Berhad, Malaysia Venture Capital Management Berhad and Malaysia Debt Ventures Berhad.

He was awarded with Panglima Jasa Negara by the Yang di-Pertuan Agong of Malaysia in 2003 and the ACCA Achievement Award 2006 for Asia by the Association of Chartered Certified Accountants (ACCA) in recognition for his contribution to the accountancy profession in Malaysia and the region.

== Honours ==
=== Honours of Malaysia ===
- Malaysia :
  - Commander of the Order of Meritorious Service (P.J.N.) - Datuk (2003)
  - Commander of the Order of Loyalty to the Crown of Malaysia (P.S.M.) - Tan Sri (2011)
