= Lee Hwa Beng =

Malaysian politician

Yang Berbahagia Dato' Lee Hwa Beng DSSA AMS
- 李华民

Member of the Selangor State Legislative Assembly for Subang Jaya
- In office 25 April 1995 – 8 March 2008
- Preceded by: new constituency
- Succeeded by: Hannah Yeoh (PR–DAP)
- Majority: 10,829 (1995); 6,895 (1999); Unopposed (2004)

Personal details
- Party: Malaysian Chinese Association (MCA) (–2012); Independent (2012–present)
- Other political affiliations: Barisan Nasional (–2012)
- Occupation: Politician, Accountant

Lee Hwa Beng (simplified Chinese: 李华民; traditional Chinese: 李華民; pinyin: Lǐ Huámín; Pe̍h-ōe-jī: Lí Huâ-bîn) is a Malaysian politician and the former Selangor State Assemblyman for Subang Jaya for three terms from 1995 to 2008. He is an accountant by training and served as Port Klang Authority chairman from 2008 to 2011.

Lee is a member of the Malaysian Chinese Association (MCA), a major component party of the ruling Barisan Nasional (BN) coalition. He first contested in 1990 general election, running for the Damansara Utama state seat. He lost but went on to win the Subang Jaya state seat for three terms in 1995, 1999 and 2004 general elections. In the 2008 general elections, Lee contested the parliamentary seat of Kelana Jaya, but lost out to Parti Keadilan Rakyat (PKR) newcomer Loh Gwo Burne. Following his defeat, Lee was appointed Port Klang Authority chairman by Transport Minister Ong Tee Keat amid a cloud of controversy over the Port Klang Free Zone scandal. He wrote the book “PKFZ:A Nation’s Trust Betrayed.” He was sacked by MCA in 2012 for investigating & exposing the PKFZ Fiasco. To date, he has not joined any political party.

== Election results ==
Selangor State Legislative Assembly
Year	Constituency	Candidate	Votes	Pct	Opponent(s)	Votes	Pct	Ballots cast	Majority	Turnout
1990	N25 Damansara Utama	Lee Hwa Beng (MCA)	10,256	40.43%	Madhavan Nair Narayanan Nair (DAP)	15,114	59.57%	25,734	4,858	69.28%
1995	N34 Subang Jaya	Lee Hwa Beng (MCA)	14,407	80.11%	A. Ghani Harun (S46)	3,578	19.89%	18,363	10,829	73.10%
1999	N34 Subang Jaya	Lee Hwa Beng (MCA)	15,701	64.07%	Ong Ing Siong (DAP)	8,806	35.93%	24,878	6,895	76.11%
2004	N31 Subang Jaya	Lee Hwa Beng (MCA)	Unopposed							

Parliament of Malaysia
Year	Constituency	Candidate	Votes	Pct	Opponent(s)	Votes	Pct	Ballots cast	Majority	Turnout
2008	P104 Kelana Jaya	Lee Hwa Beng (MCA)	25,267	43.97%	Loh Gwo Burne (PKR)	30,298	52.73%	58,625	5,031	73.61%
2008	P104 Kelana Jaya	Lee Hwa Beng (MCA)	25,267	43.97%	Billi Lim Peng Soon (IND)	1,895	3.30%	58,625	5,031	73.61%

== Honours ==
- Selangor
  - Knight Companion of the Order of Sultan Salahuddin Abdul Aziz Shah (DSSA) – Dato' (1999)
  - Member of the Order of the Crown of Selangor (AMS) (1997)
