= Kelana Jaya (federal constituency) =

Selangor constituency

Defunct federal constituency
- Legislature: Dewan Rakyat
- Constituency created: 2003
- Constituency abolished: 2018
- First contested: 2004
- Last contested: 2013

Kelana Jaya was a federal constituency in Selangor, Malaysia, that was represented in the Dewan Rakyat from 2004 to 2018.

The federal constituency was created in the 2003 redistribution and was mandated to return a single member to the Dewan Rakyat under the first past the post voting system.

== History ==
It was abolished in 2018 when it was redistributed.

=== Representation history ===
Members of Parliament for Kelana Jaya
Parliament	No	Years	Member	Party	Vote Share
Constituency created from Subang
11th	P104	2004–2008	Loh Seng Kok (卢诚国)	BN (MCA)	35,846; 71.52%
12th	P104	2008–2013	Loh Gwo Burne (罗国本)	PR (PKR)	30,298; 52.73%
13th	P104	2013–2015	Wong Chen (黄基全)	PR (PKR)	56,790; 66.72%
13th	P104	2015–2018	Wong Chen (黄基全)	PH (PKR)	56,790; 66.72%
Constituency abolished split into Subang and Petaling Jaya

=== State constituency ===
Parliamentary constituency	State constituency						
Parliamentary constituency	1955–59*	1959–1974	1974–1986	1986–1995	1995–2004	2004–2018	2018–present
Kelana Jaya						Seri Setia	
Kelana Jaya						Subang Jaya	

=== Historical boundaries ===
State Constituency	Area
State Constituency	2003
Seri Setia	Glenmarie; Kelana Jaya; Lindungan; PJS5 - 6, 8, 10; SS7 - 9, 10 - 11
Subang Jaya	Bandar Sunway; PJS7, 9, 11-12; SS12 - 19; Subang Jaya; USJ1 - 21

== Election results ==
Malaysian general election, 2013
Party	Candidate	Votes	%	∆%
PKR	Wong Chen	56,790	66.72	▲13.99
BN	Loh Seng Kok	27,963	32.85	▼11.12
Independent	Toh Sin Wah	363	0.43	▲0.43
Total valid votes		85,116	100.00	
Total rejected ballots		1,171		
Unreturned ballots		210		
Turnout		86,497	85.44	▲11.83
Registered electors		101,236		
Majority		28,827	33.87	▲25.11
PKR hold		Swing		
Source(s) "Federal Government Gazette - Notice of Contested Election, Parliament for the State of Selangor [P.U. (B) 176/2013]" (PDF). Attorney General's Chambers of Malaysia. 26 April 2013. Archived from the original (PDF) on 2018-09-30. "Federal Government Gazette - Results of Contested Election and Statements of the Poll after the Official Addition of Votes, Parliamentary Constituencies for the State of Selangor [P.U. (B) 217/2013]" (PDF). Attorney General's Chambers of Malaysia. 22 May 2013. Archived from the original (PDF) on 2018-09-30.

Malaysian general election, 2008
Party	Candidate	Votes	%	∆%
PKR	Loh Gwo Burne	30,298	52.73	▲24.25
BN	Lee Hwa Beng	25,267	43.97	▼27.55
Independent	Lim Peng Soon	1,895	3.30	▲3.30
Total valid votes		57,460	100.00	
Total rejected ballots		1,065		
Unreturned ballots		100		
Turnout		58,625	73.61	▲3.55
Registered electors		79,648		
Majority		5,031	8.76	▼34.28
PKR gain from BN		Swing		?

Malaysian general election, 2004
Party	Candidate	Votes	%
BN	Loh Seng Kok	35,846	71.52
PKR	Syed Shahir Syed Mohamud	14,275	28.48
Total valid votes		50,121	100.00
Total rejected ballots		627	
Unreturned ballots		55	
Turnout		50,803	70.06
Registered electors		72,513	
Majority		21,571	43.04
This was a new constituency created.
