= Loh Gwo Burne =

Malaysian politician

- 罗国本

Member of the Malaysian Parliament for Kelana Jaya
- In office 8 March 2008 – 5 May 2013
- Preceded by: Loh Seng Kok (BN–MCA)
- Succeeded by: Wong Chen (PR–PKR)
- Majority: 5,031 (2008)

Personal details
- Born: 26 February 1974 (age 52) London, England
- Party: People's Justice Party (PKR)
- Other political affiliations: Pakatan Rakyat (PR) (2008–2015); Pakatan Harapan (PH) (2015–present)
- Education: University of Hull; China University of Political Science and Law
- Occupation: Politician

Loh Gwo Burne (simplified Chinese: 罗国本; traditional Chinese: 羅國本; pinyin: Luō Guóběn; born 26 February 1974) is a Malaysian politician. He was the member of the Malaysian Parliament for Kelana Jaya, Selangor for one term from 2008 to 2013. He set in Parliament as a member of the People's Justice Party (PKR) in the Pakatan Rakyat (PR) opposition coalition then.

Loh first gained fame when a video that he shot led to a Royal Commission of Inquiry into the manipulation of judicial appointments. In the 2008 election, he was named by Keadilan to contest the seat of Kelana Jaya, and subsequently defeated Barisan Nasional candidate Lee Hwa Beng and independent Billi Lim Peng Soon.

Loh attended primary school at Sam Teck and secondary school at Poi Lam as well as ACS in Singapore. He has a degree in law from London and a master in law from China.

== Election results ==
Parliament of Malaysia
Year	Constituency	Candidate	Votes	Pct	Opponent(s)	Votes	Pct	Ballots cast	Majority	Turnout
2008	P104 Kelana Jaya	Loh Gwo Burne (PKR)	30,298	51.68%	Lee Hwa Beng (MCA)	25,267	43.10%	58,625	5,031	71.91%
2008	P104 Kelana Jaya	Loh Gwo Burne (PKR)	30,298	51.68%	Billi Lim Peng Soon (IND)	1,895	3.23%	58,625	5,031	71.91%
