= Ramanan Ramakrishnan =

Malaysian politician

Yang Berhormat Dato' Sri Ramanan Ramakrishnan SJMK SSAP DIMP JP MP
- ரமணன் ராமகிருஷ்ணன்
- Ramanan Ramakrishnan in 2024

Minister of Human Resources
- Incumbent
- Assumed office 17 December 2025
- Monarch: Ibrahim Iskandar
- Prime Minister: Anwar Ibrahim
- Deputy: Khairul Firdaus Akbar Khan
- Preceded by: Steven Sim Chee Keong
- Constituency: Sungai Buloh

Deputy Minister of Entrepreneur and Cooperatives Development
- In office 12 December 2023 – 17 December 2025
- Monarchs: Abdullah (2023–2024); Ibrahim Iskandar (2024–2025)
- Prime Minister: Anwar Ibrahim
- Minister: Ewon Benedick
- Preceded by: Saraswathy Kandasami
- Succeeded by: Mohamad Alamin
- Constituency: Sungai Buloh

Chairman of the Special Committee of the Malaysian Indian Community Transformation Unit
- In office 18 April 2023 – 7 February 2024
- Prime Minister: Anwar Ibrahim
- Minister: Armizan Mohd Ali (April–December 2023); Aaron Ago Dagang (December 2023–2024)
- Director-General: Raveendran Nair
- Succeeded by: Prabakaran Parameswaran

Member of the Malaysian Parliament for Sungai Buloh
- Incumbent
- Assumed office 19 November 2022
- Preceded by: Sivarasa Rasiah (PH–PKR)
- Majority: 2,693 (2022)

Vice President of the People's Justice Party
- Incumbent
- Assumed office 25 May 2025 Serving with: Amirudin Shari &; Chang Lih Kang &; Aminuddin Harun &
- President: Anwar Ibrahim
- Preceded by: Nik Nazmi Nik Ahmad

Personal details
- Born: 11 February 1981 (age 45) Kuala Lumpur, Malaysia
- Party: Malaysian Indian Congress (MIC) (–2014); People's Justice Party (PKR) (since 2020)
- Other political affiliations: Barisan Nasional (BN) (–2014); Pakatan Harapan (PH) (since 2020)
- Relations: Devaki Krishnan (grandmother)
- Education: Queensland University of Technology
- Occupation: Politician

Ramanan Ramakrishnan (Tamil: ரமணன் ராமகிருஷ்ணன்; born 11 February 1981) is a Malaysian politician of Indian descent. He has served as the Minister of Human Resources as part of the Anwar Ibrahim cabinet since December 2025. He became the first Malaysian of Tamil origin to hold a full ministerial portfolio after a hiatus of two years. He has been Member of Parliament (MP) for Sungai Buloh since November 2022, and is also a Vice President of People's Justice Party, having secured the second-highest number of votes in the 2025 party election.

== Early life ==
Born Ramanan s/o Ramakrishnan, he was the eldest grandson of Devaki Krishnan, the first woman elected to public office in Malaysia.

== Election results ==
Parliament of Malaysia
Year	Constituency	Candidate	Votes	Pct	Opponent(s)	Votes	Pct	Ballots cast	Majority	Turnout
2022	P107 Sungai Buloh	Ramanan Ramakrishnan (PKR)	50,943	39.30%	Khairy Jamaluddin (UMNO)	48,250	37.22%	130,846	2,693	82.00%
2022	P107 Sungai Buloh	Ramanan Ramakrishnan (PKR)	50,943	39.30%	Mohd Ghazali Md Hamin (PAS)	29,060	22.42%	130,846	2,693	82.00%
2022	P107 Sungai Buloh	Ramanan Ramakrishnan (PKR)	50,943	39.30%	Mohd Akmal Mohd Yusoff (PEJUANG)	829	0.64%	130,846	2,693	82.00%
2022	P107 Sungai Buloh	Ramanan Ramakrishnan (PKR)	50,943	39.30%	Ahmad Zuhri Faisal (PRM)	279	0.22%	130,846	2,693	82.00%
2022	P107 Sungai Buloh	Ramanan Ramakrishnan (PKR)	50,943	39.30%	Syed Razak Alsagoff (IND)	165	0.13%	130,846	2,693	82.00%
2022	P107 Sungai Buloh	Ramanan Ramakrishnan (PKR)	50,943	39.30%	Nurhaslinda Basri (IND)	113	0.09%	130,846	2,693	82.00%

== Honours ==
=== Honours of Malaysia ===
- Malaysia
  - Recipient of the 17th Yang di-Pertuan Agong Installation Medal (2024)
- Kelantan
  - Knight Grand Commander of the Order of the Life of the Crown of Kelantan (SJMK) – Dato' (2026)
  - Justice of the Peace (JP) (2025)
- Pahang
  - Knight Grand Companion of the Order of Sultan Ahmad Shah of Pahang (SSAP) – Dato' Sri (2024)
  - Knight Companion of the Order of the Crown of Pahang (DIMP) – Dato' (2008)
