= Sivarasa Rasiah =

Malaysian politician, lawyer and human rights activist

- சிவராசா ராசையா

Deputy Minister of Rural Development
- In office 2 July 2018 – 24 February 2020
- Monarchs: Muhammad V (2018–2019); Abdullah (2019–2020)
- Prime Minister: Mahathir Mohamad
- Minister: Rina Harun
- Preceded by: Alexander Nanta Linggi (Deputy Minister of Rural and Regional Development I); Ahmad Jazlan Yaakub (Deputy Minister of Rural and Regional Development II)
- Succeeded by: Abdul Rahman Mohamad (Deputy Minister of Rural Development I); Henry Sum Agong (Deputy Minister of Rural Development II)
- Constituency: Sungai Buloh

Member of the Malaysian Parliament for Sungai Buloh
- In office 9 May 2018 – 19 November 2022
- Preceded by: Position established
- Succeeded by: Ramanan Ramakrishnan (PH–PKR)
- Majority: 26,634 (2018)

Member of the Malaysian Parliament for Subang
- In office 8 March 2008 – 9 May 2018
- Preceded by: Karnail Singh Nijhar (BN–MIC)
- Succeeded by: Wong Chen (PH–PKR)
- Majority: 6,709 (2008); 26,719 (2013)

Personal details
- Born: Sivarasa a/l K. Rasiah; 8 December 1956 (age 69) Selangor, Federation of Malaya (now Malaysia)
- Party: National Justice Party (keADILan) (1999–2003); People's Justice Party (PKR) (2003–present)
- Other political affiliations: Pakatan Harapan (PH) (2015–present); Pakatan Rakyat (PR) (2008–2015); Barisan Alternatif (BA) (1999–2004)
- Spouse: Anne James
- Education: University of Malaya; University of Oxford
- Occupation: Politician, lawyer

Sivarasa a/l K. Rasiah (Tamil: சிவராசா ராசையா, romanized: Civarācā rācaiyā; born 8 December 1956), or also known as R. Sivarasa is a Malaysian politician, lawyer and human rights activist of Ceylonese and Sri Lankan descent who served as the Deputy Minister of Rural Development in the Pakatan Harapan (PH) administration under former Prime Minister Mahathir Mohamad and former Minister Rina Harun from July 2018 to the collapse of the PH administration in February 2020 and the Member of Parliament (MP) for Sungai Buloh from May 2018 to November 2022 as well as for Subang from March 2008 to May 2018. He is a member and former Vice-President of the People's Justice Party (PKR), a component party of the PH coalition. He is co-founder of the Suara Rakyat Malaysia (SUARAM), a human rights non-governmental organisation (NGO).

== Early life ==
Though today he may be one of the top and prominent lawyers in Kuala Lumpur, however, his first degree was actually in genetics. Reminiscing on his early days in an interview with the New Straits Times, Siva said, "I was trying to get into medicine after high school in Victoria Institution but didn't make the grade. Form Five was great but I guess in Form Six, there were many distractions. So instead I went into genetics in Universiti Malaya and graduated with first class honours. Six months into my Master's I realised that this was not my cup of tea and was already looking at other options.” He then applied for a Rhodes scholarship to pursue law at Oxford University. After completing his law degree and the Bar in Britain, Siva took a year off and went to Germany where he spent most of his time in libraries there reading. He worked for a bit after that in London before returning to Malaysia on his 30th birthday.

== Activism and politics ==
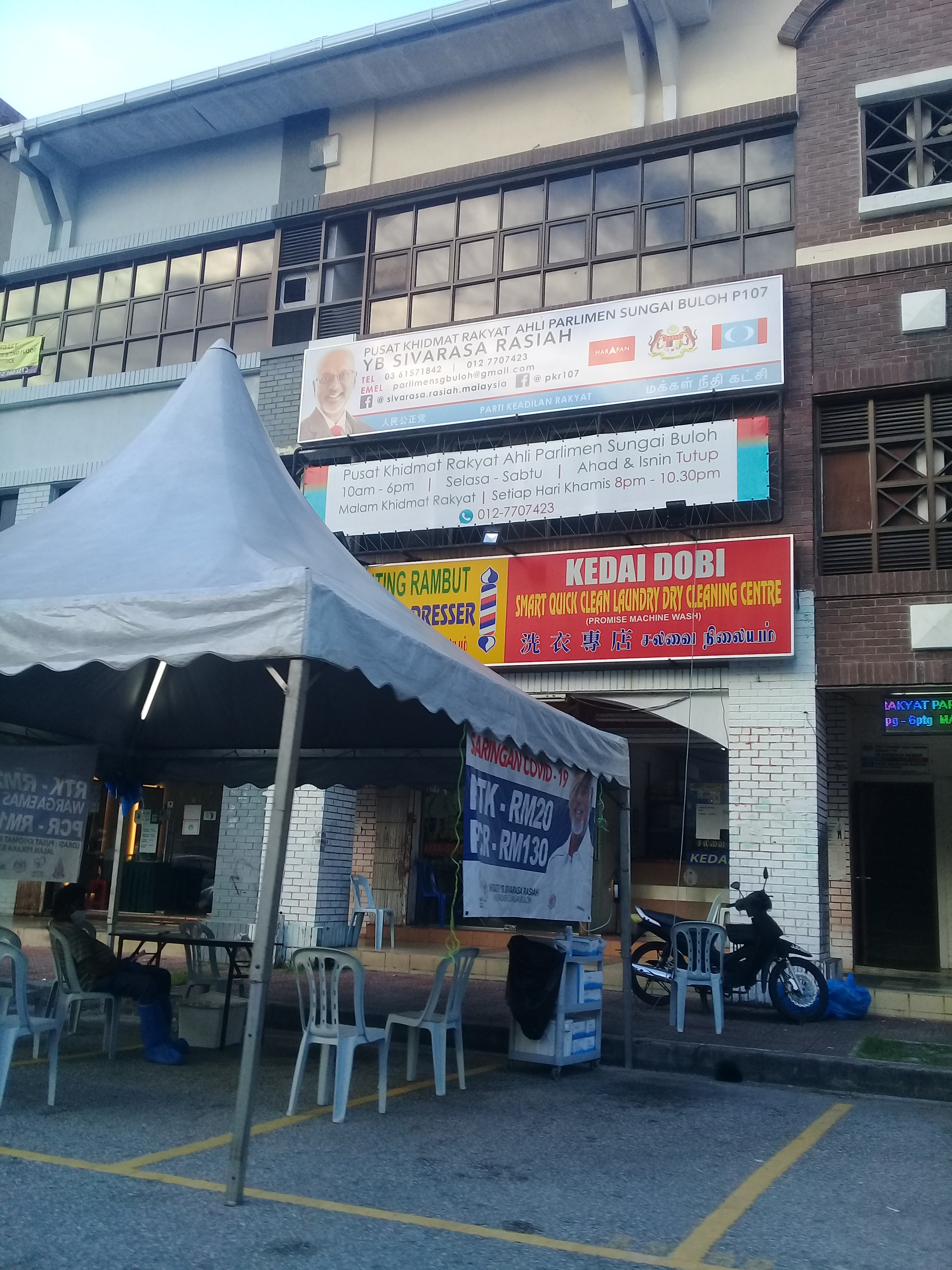
Sivarasa Rasiah Community Service Center at Section 8 of Kota Damansara.

It was while he was in the United Kingdom that he got interested in human rights and "became involved with union workers and stuff like that there".

His first involvement with an NGO was in 1997 when he got involved with a women's group called Citizens Against Rape. Siva got arrested twice during the 1998 Reformasi period but shrugs it off as part and parcel of the job. He later joined PKR.

In the 2008 general election, Sivarasa was elected as the Member of Parliament for Subang, defeating his opponent by a 6,000 vote majority; he went on to keep the seat in the 2013 general election.

In the 2018 general election, Sivarasa was reelected for his parliamentary seat which was renamed as Sungai Buloh in an earlier redelineation exercise.

Sivarasa was appointed Deputy Minister of Rural Development of Malaysia and sworn in on 2 July 2018 in the presence of His Majesty the Yang di Pertuan Agong of Malaysia.

== Personal life ==
He is married to Ann James, a personality in the Malaysian theatre scene. He met his wife at a demonstration as well. "It was during Operasi Lalang and she was there too. We were kind of thrown together and that's when it all happened. After a long courtship, we finally got married in 1993", he revealed in the NST interview.

Although Sivarasa has had brushes with the police, both his father and his older brother were members of the force; his father was the registrar of the police force and his older brother was a senior police officer.

He is also a cancer survivor who lost his voice for almost a year due to thyroid cancer which damaged a nerve on his vocal cords. He had to speak with a little boom box and a speaker for a while due to this. He has regained his voice but he says, "I can't sing or shout, but at least I still can talk.”

He is also an avid guitar player.

== Election results ==
Parliament of Malaysia
Year	Constituency	Candidate	Votes	Pct	Opponent(s)	Votes	Pct	Ballots cast	Majority	Turnout
1999	P092 Ampang Jaya	Sivarasa Rasiah (keADILan)	32,902	44.72%	Ong Tee Keat (MCA)	40,669	55.28%	74,869	7,767	75.98%
2004	P105 Petaling Jaya Selatan	Sivarasa Rasiah (PKR)	13,638	27.42%	Donald Lim Siang Chai (MCA)	35,054	70.48%	49,738	21,416	67.67%
2008	P107 Subang	Sivarasa Rasiah (PKR)	35,024	53.18%	Murugesan Sinnandavar (MIC)	28,315	42.99%	65,861	6,709	78.02%
2013	P107 Subang	Sivarasa Rasiah (PKR)	66,268	58.65%	Pakas Rao Applanaidoo (MIC)	39,549	35.00%	112,937	26,719	87.86%
2013	P107 Subang	Sivarasa Rasiah (PKR)	66,268	58.65%	Mohamad Ismail (BERJASA)	4,454	3.94%	112,937	26,719	87.86%
2013	P107 Subang	Sivarasa Rasiah (PKR)	66,268	58.65%	Nazaruddin Mohd Ferdoos (IND)	460	0.41%	112,937	26,719	87.86%
2013	P107 Subang	Sivarasa Rasiah (PKR)	66,268	58.65%	Edros Abdullah (IND)	218	0.19%	112,937	26,719	87.86%
2018	P107 Sungai Buloh	Sivarasa Rasiah (PKR)	43,631	55.97%	Pakas Rao Applanaidoo (MIC)	16,681	21.40%	77,951	26,634	85.93%
2018	P107 Sungai Buloh	Sivarasa Rasiah (PKR)	43,631	55.97%	Nuridah Mohd Salleh (PAS)	16,997	21.80%	77,951	26,634	85.93%
2018	P107 Sungai Buloh	Sivarasa Rasiah (PKR)	43,631	55.97%	Zainurizzaman Moharam (PRM)	642	0.82%	77,951	26,634	85.93%

== See all ==
- Subang (federal constituency)
- Sungai Buloh (federal constituency)

Parliament of Malaysia
New creation	Member of Parliament for Sungai Buloh; 10 May 2018–present	Incumbent
Preceded by Karnail Singh Nijhar	Member of Parliament for Subang; 8 March 2008–9 May 2018	Succeeded by Wong Chen
