= Sexual harassment in Malaysia =

In Malaysia, sexual harassment, as defined by the Employment Act 1955, is “any unwanted conduct of a sexual nature, whether verbal, non-verbal, visual, gestural or physical, directed at a person which is offensive, humiliating or a threat to their well-being”. The Act does not distinguish between male and female or employer and employee. As such, sexual harassment can be committed by a female against a male, or an employee against an employer.

The earliest recorded cases of sexual harassment at the workplace or misconduct of an employer towards an employee were seen as far back as 1939, at the time when Malaysia was still Malaya under the British colonial rule. In 1941, the Klang Indian Union organised a series of strike action and as part of their demands, condemned the molestation of female workers by Europeans and ‘Black Europeans’ and demanded an end to such behaviour. In 1950, 106 women and men rubber tappers from Panavan Karupiah Estate in Perak went on strike against sexual molestation.

== Prevalence of sexual harassment ==
Sexual harassment cases in Malaysia (2013 - 2017)

Although sexual harassment happens to both men and women, women are more often victims, especially in circumstances and locations where "patriarchy is deeply ingrained as a cultural value, and the men see nothing wrong in sexually harassing women". This is consistent with the statistics from the Royal Malaysian Police (PDRM) between 2013 and 2017, where out of a total of 1,218 reported sexual harassment cases, 79 percent involved victims who were women while 21 percent involved male victims.

In 1987, the Women's Section of the Malaysian Trades Union Congress (MTUC) conducted the first known survey on sexual harassment in the country. It reported that 11 to 90 per cent of the female respondents experienced sexual harassment in the workplace. However, this survey had two major flaws, and the findings were judged to be "inconclusive and not much of use". In 2001, International Labour Organization (ILO) cited two surveys of two government departments in Penang and Perlis in Malaysia, which found that 83 per cent and 88 per cent of women respondents had experienced some form of sexual harassment.

There is a lack of official statistics surrounding sexual harassment in Malaysia. As a response, the 2019 YouGov Omnibus survey was launched to find out how prevalent the issue was. Over a third or 36 per cent of Malaysian women have experienced sexual harassment, compared to one in six (17 per cent) men. The survey sampled 1,002 Malaysians, and of those who faced harassment only half (53 per cent) reported or told someone about what they had to endure. The most common form of sexual harassment experienced by Malaysian women is sexual assault (59%), followed by verbal comments of a sexual nature (48%), flashing (29%) and unwanted sexualised photography or videography (20%).

=== Sexual harassment at the workplace ===
Sexual harassment at the workplace is a major problem in Malaysia. The prevalence of sexual harassment in Malaysia has been studied across different settings; within the civil service, various public and private workplaces such as hospitals, hotels, small and medium businesses, as well as various higher education institutions, both public and private universities. There are also sub-groups within the general Malaysian population who are more vulnerable to sexual harassment, such as adolescents, refugees, clerical workers, staff in the service sector (hotels), sports practitioners, female plantation workers, LGBT and migrant workers.

=== Online sexual harassment ===
According to the 2017 survey conducted by PeopleACT, online sexual harassment was the second highest type of cyberharassment experienced by people. Out of 522 respondents, 89 stated that they have been sexually harassed online. Twice as many women (20.9 percent) experienced online sexual harassment compared to men (9.8 percent).

In 2020, with increased internet use as a side effect of the COVID-19 pandemic, All Women's Action Society Malaysia (AWAM) reported many incidents of online sexual harassment that has come to their attention prior and during the movement control order. Sexual harassment cases make up 18.5 per cent of calls that comes through AWAM helpline, and from that category, online sexual harassment accounts for 41.7 per cent of these cases. As more people resorted to online media and communications as a result of social distancing, many took advantage of online anonymity and expressed their discontent through sexist jokes, comments and in some cases, sexual harassment.

== Development of legal provisions ==
=== Raising awareness among the public (1985-1996) ===
The activism behind the issue of sexual harassment in Malaysia appears to be a combination of individual and collaborative efforts between female trade unionists, NGOs as well as the larger coalition of women's groups in Malaysia. Since 1985, awareness-raising on sexual harassment was done by the Joint Action Group against Violence Against Women (JAG-VAW) through talks and seminars to the public, and this was extended to schools by AWAM and National Council of Women's Organization (NCWO). In 1988 the Women's Section of MTUC launched a specific campaign against sexual harassment in the workplace in response to a series of complaints from its members. In the 1990s, MTUC and AWAM joined forces in an awareness campaign that targeted all sections of society. There was significant need for public outreach as the topic of sexual harassment was almost taboo and victims were not keen to come forward. There also seemed to be a blind spot from Malaysian industry leaders. According to the Asian Executives Poll by the Far Eastern Economic Review in July 1996, in a poll involving 10 countries in the region, almost 60 per cent of Malaysian senior executives answered that sexual harassment was not a problem in the country.

A landmark case in 1996 changed the tone of public discourse, when the Industrial Court handed down the first award directly related to sexual harassment. Industrial Court Award No. 606 of 1996: Jennico Associates and Lilian de Costa received immense media publicity at the time. A director of operations of a hotel left her job and claimed constructive dismissal on the basis that the CEO, her immediate superior, had on two occasions kissed and tried to fondle her. She claimed that when she did not respond to his advances, he further harassed her by finding fault with her work. The Industrial Court found that; although the employee resigned, she was, in fact, forced to do so by the behaviour of her employer, although this decision was later overturned by the High Court.

The media coverage and campaigns by various women's groups highlighted that women at work required more protection than they were getting, which pushed the Ministry of Human Resources (MOHR) into action. A milestone was reached when MOHR announced its intention to prepare and issue a code to prevent and eradicate sexual harassment in the workplace. AWAM and the Women's section of MTUC were invited to be part of the Technical Committee responsible for drafting the Code.

=== Guidelines for employers (1999) ===
In August 1999 MOHR launched the Code of Practice on the Prevention and Eradication of Sexual Harassment in the Workplace. The aim is to provide guidelines to employers on the establishment of in-house mechanisms at the company level to prevent and eradicate sexual harassment at work. According to the code, sexual harassment is defined as:

"Any unwanted conduct of sexual nature having the effect of verbal, non-verbal, visual, psychological or physical harassment;

1. that might, on reasonable grounds, be perceived by the recipient as placing a condition of a sexual nature on his/her employment; or
2. that might, on reasonable grounds, be perceived by the recipient as an offence or humiliation, or threat to his/her well-being, but has no direct link to his/her employment."

The code illustrates the following categories of behaviour and their possible examples:

Examples of behaviours that constitute sexual harassment
Type of Harassment	Examples of Undesirable Behaviour
Verbal	Offensive or suggestive remarks, comments, jokes, kidding, sounds, questioning
Non-verbal / gestures	Leering, ogling, suggestive overtones, licking lips, holding or eating food provocatively, hand signal, sign language denoting sexual activities, persistent flirting
Visual	Showing pornographic materials, drawing sex-based sketches, writing sex-based letters, sexual exposure
Psychological	Repeated unwanted social invitations, relentless proposals for dates or physical intimacy
Physical	Inappropriate touching, patting, pinching, stroking, brushing up against the body, hugging, kissing, fondling and sexual assault

=== Lack of adoption of the code (2000 to present) ===
While the Code has been the first concrete step towards recognising the seriousness of the issue, it is a voluntary code and is not legally binding. In early 2005, the Department of Labour estimated that out of 400,000 registered workplaces, only 624 have an in-house mechanism to tackle sexual harassment in the workplace. By 2010, less than 0.1% of registered and active companies had adopted the Code.

The other shortcoming was that the code did not give rise to a cause of action for the victim against the harasser. It is not uncommon to hear of survivors losing their jobs after lodging a sexual harassment complaint. If a person's employment is terminated as a result of their bona fide complaint of sexual harassment, the staff is only entitled to make a representation to the Industrial Department under section 20 of the Industrial Relation Act 1967 for unfair dismissal.

=== Pushing for a comprehensive sexual harassment legislation (2001) ===
The push for a more comprehensive sexual harassment law was ignited by a specific case in 1999, which highlighted the lack of legal protection for victims of sexual harassment. Women's Crisis Centre (WCC) received complaints of sexual harassment from six women working in a resort hotel in Penang, where they were sexually harassed by the general manager. Two of them had already resigned because of his actions and the remaining four were afraid that they would be suspended after the New Year holidays. Their fears came true as one by one they were all terminated as the labour officer and women's groups witnessed that there was no legal provision to block the dismissals.

In 2000 JAG reconvened to petition for legislation on sexual harassment at the workplace to address the legal gap highlighted by the terminations. Within six weeks, WCC and other women's groups, as well as trade unions and worker's association gathered 12,800 signatures from individuals and the endorsement of 64 organisations comprising civil, professional, health, workers, social, political and other interest groups. MOHR was invited to accept the petitions on 30 June 2000.

==== Draft bill ====
Having learnt from past errors where campaigns for legal reforms were not supported by model legislations, JAG drafted and submitted a full draft legislation on sexual harassment to MOHR on 30 March 2001. An international round table discussion was held where international experts and local government officers including those from the Attorney General's Chambers, Labour Office and NGOs was unanimous in calling for legislation on sexual harassment. WCC hosted the draft bill on their website, where members of the public can view the proposed legislation.

In summary, the Bill seeks to prevent sexual harassment in the workplace and provide concrete mechanisms to deal with the problem. The aim was to make it easier for sexual harassment victims to get help and to stop the harassment. Employers will be expected to set up workplaces safe from sexual harassment, and to investigate when they receive complaints. In addition, negligent employers can be held responsible if they do nothing to stop sexual harassment. The Bill also required the setting up of an independent body to receive and investigate complaints, as well as a faster and hassle-free action to resolve the complaint.

Some of the main points of the bill addresses the gap within the Employment Act as well as the Code of Conduct:

1. Under the Bill, anyone who is sexually harassed, or who witnesses sexual harassment, can make a complaint to the independent body, even if their company has its own policy. The complaint must be made within two years of the last incident. By allowing witnesses to raise complaints, this takes the burden away from the victim as the only possible person to serve as a complainant.
2. The Bill takes a much broader meaning of “workplace” and “employee” unlike the existing employment laws. The bill aims to protect contract workers, domestic workers, students, members of clubs, athletes, customers and members of industrial organizations, all of which does not fall under the ambit of the Employment Act.
3. The Bill also proposed that all complaints will be investigated by an independent body, rather than having the employer conduct an internal investigation. Subject to the complainant's agreement, a meeting will be held between them, the harasser, and the independent body's representative to try and settle the problem. Any agreement made can be enforced by the court. If the discussion does not work, or the complainant declines to meet, then a hearing will be held before a Tribunal.
4. If the harasser is found guilty, the harasser will have to apologise, and may have to pay compensation. The harasser can also be disciplined, dismissed or suspended. These orders can be enforced by the court, where the company may have to re-employ or promote the complainant as part of the legal redress.

The draft Bill was reviewed and critiqued with amendments, and the amended bill resubmitted to the government. An extensive campaign was conducted which received good media coverage, but despite the petitions and extensive consultative process, by 2005, there was still no draft legislation being tabled in Parliament by the relevant ministry.

=== Amendments to the Employment Act (2012) ===
There are no legal provisions to punish harassment such as upskirting. Image created by Gan Khoon Lay

Because of the low rate of code adoption, since 2004 MOHR had proposed several amendments to the Employment Act 1955 (EA) to give the needed legal backing to the Code of Practice. Employment (Amendment) Act 2012 (Act A1419) came into force in April 2012, prior to which there was no specific legislation on sexual harassment in the workplace. This amendment outlines the manner in which employers should deal with complaints of sexual harassment at the place of work:

1. Definitions of what constitutes a complaint of sexual harassment (section 81A),
2. The grievance procedure and provision for exemptions from inquiry on the employer's part (section 81B),
3. Disciplinary actions to be taken by the employer upon proven findings of the inquiry (section 81C)
4. Complaints of sexual harassment which are made directly to the Director General and his decisions (section 81D)
5. Effects of decisions of the Director General (section 81E)
6. Offence and conviction of employers who fail to conduct inquiries, or fail to inform to the complainant, or fail to report to the Director General regarding inquiries (section 81F). A company could be fined up to a maximum of RM10,000.
7. Application of the above law extends to every employee with a contract of service regardless of wage level.

Limitations of the amendment

Despite the changes, the amendment did not resolve many issues related to sexual harassment. Some of the gaps are listed below:

1. It did not address the rights and liabilities of the harasser and the victim.
2. It only provides coverage to victims of work-related sexual harassment, whereas many online sexual harassment falls outside the bounds of employment.
3. It is only enforceable in Peninsular Malaysia. In Sabah and Sarawak, labour is regulated by the Labour Ordinance of the respective states – both of which do not contain provisions for sexual harassment.
4. The advancement of technology have enabled new offences (often sexual in nature) that currently have no legal provisions in Malaysian law: upskirting, sending letters or disclosing private photographs with intent to cause distress ('revenge porn'), stalking, cyberbullying, and disclosing of personal information to cause violence or harassment to others ('doxxing').

=== Landmark case in sexual harassment (2016) ===
The case of Mohd Ridzwan Abdul Razak v Asmah Hj Mohd Nor [2016] 4 MLJ 282 is the first case where the Malaysian High Court has awarded damages to a victim of sexual harassment in the workplace and has opened the door for survivors who wish to bring civil suits against the perpetrators.

Background

Asmah was a senior manager of The Pilgrimage Fund Board (Malay: Lembaga Tabung Haji, or LTH), where she reported to Ridzwan, the General Manager of the Risk Management Department. In July 2009, she lodged an internal complaint to the CEO claiming sexual harassment by Ridzwan based on his repeated vulgar remarks, dirty jokes of a sexual nature, use of rude words in emails and repeated offers to make Asmah his second wife. The company initiated an inquiry but found that there was insufficient evidence to warrant disciplinary action against Ridzwan, however a strong administrative reprimand was given to him and his contract with LTH was subsequently not renewed. As for Asmah, she was transferred to another division within LTH as soon as the investigation commenced, where she was assigned to an unrelated role from her original job description, and she eventually left the organisation.

Litigation

In December 2011, two years after the internal inquiry had concluded, Ridzwan sued Asmah for defamation and also sought a declaration that he had not sexually harassed her. He claimed that Asmah's complaint had defamed him and had affected his reputation and standing as a Muslim. Ridzwan also sought for a public apology, as well as general and aggravated damages, interest and costs. Asmah filed a defence and counterclaim, where she disclosed in detail the sexual harassment elements suffered under Ridzwan. She pleaded that her complaint was upheld by LTH given the reprimand that was issued, and denied the allegations of defamation. Asmah also counterclaimed for damages for sexual harassment, alleging that she had suffered emotional and mental stress and trauma.

Judgement

The High Court dismissed Ridzwan's claim and allowed Asmah's counterclaim, awarding her RM100,000 and RM20,000 in general and aggravated damages in 2012. However, the High Court failed to identify the type of tort the counterclaim was based upon, and Ridzwan appealed. The Court of Appeal upheld the finding of the High Court Judge but held that the cause of action was founded on the tort of intentionally causing nervous shock. Thus, Ridzwan took his case to the Federal Court, as the apex court in Malaysia and the final level of appeal.

In their summary, the Federal Court stated their decision to undertake some judicial activism and decided that "it is timely to import the tort of harassment into our legal and judicial system, with sexual harassment being part of it”, thus creating a new law in this case by classifying sexual harassment as a tort.

The elements of the tort of sexual harassment are as follows:

1. Persistent and deliberate course of unreasonable and oppressive conduct;
2. The conduct was targeted at another person; and
3. The conduct was calculated to cause alarm, fear and distress to the other person.

The Federal Court also stated that it is not a legal requirement for the allegations to be corroborated by a third party. The need for corroboration would render the victim helpless since most harassment would take place in private. This decision is seen as a major triumph for survivors of sexual harassment as current legal protections places a high burden of proof on the victims, as seen with the Penal Code and the Communications and Multimedia Act 1998.

== Consequences of sexual harassment ==
It has been argued that sexual harassment is a human rights violation that the government should recognise and give protection to victims accordingly, and the act is seen as a form of violence against women. Although it differs in degree and type, sexual harassment is said to be equivalent to rape, domestic violence and abuse, because the consequences are the same, which is to dehumanise women by violating their dignity and self respect.

There are significant negative impact to the victim and others in their periphery. The effects can either be seen immediately or it can manifest over a longer period of time. Negative impacts due to harassment can be experienced by the victim as well as secondary victims (family members, friends or colleagues of the victim). There are also organizational impact that negatively affects the company or institution should they be seen unwilling or unable to deal with sexual harassment cases in a fair and respectful way to both parties.

=== Personal impact to victims of sexual harassment ===
Sexual harassment can be traumatising and can affect the well-being of the victim. Deteriorating physical, emotional and mental health (anxiety, depression, tension, guilt) may require medical attention and treatment, incurring additional expenses. As the victim's stress increases, productivity could also be affected as the victim's job satisfaction is reduced. If the person fears retaliation for speaking up, often the only option left is for them to leave the company, which then disrupts their career progression. Sexual harassment has become an obstacle preventing women from climbing up the corporate ladder and social structure effectively.

In the case of Mohd Ridzwan Abdul Razak v Asmah Hj Mohd Nor [2016] 4 MLJ 282, Asmah was examined four times by a psychiatrist and was diagnosed with major depression caused by the harassment, and she also bore physical symptoms of migraine and pains in her leg. Even though she was transferred to a different unit and was no longer working under the perpetrator, she could no longer bear the emotional stress to the point where she had to leave the organisation and move to another state.

=== Personal impact to secondary victims ===
Secondary victims refer to people who are indirectly affected when they are acting in response to the victim of sexual harassment. They may be family members, partners, friends and children and their own response to the victim's experience could either help or hinder the victim's recovery. It becomes an added impact to the victim if he or she faces unsupportive behaviour from family members. In cases where victims have been pressured to remain silent or withdraw the allegations to preserve the family reputation, the stress and antagonism could lead to a breakdown of the family relationship.

=== Organizational impact to corporations, institutions and wider society ===
Sexual harassment may also negatively impact an organisation. Failure to provide a safe working environment free from sexual harassment may lead to a high turnover of staff. While victims may choose to leave for self-preservation, colleagues and witnesses of inappropriate behaviour may be equally demoralised if no action was seen to be taken. Indicators of poor handling of sexual harassment cases may manifest in dysfunctional company cultures, such as increased absenteeism, decrease in productivity, lack of incentive to innovate and increased inefficiencies. According to Relate Mental Health Malaysia (Relate), employees’ mental health conditions may cost RM14.46 billion or more than one per cent of Malaysia's total Gross Domestic Product (GDP) due to mental health issues linked with absenteeism, presenteeism (working while unwell) and staff turnover.

== Key cases of sexual harassment ==
=== Death and rape threats to three female members of Parliament (May 2020) ===
After receiving death and rape threats online, three Pakatan Harapan representatives (Bandar Utama assemblyman Jamaliah Jamaluddin, Kampung Tunku assemblyman Lim Yi Wei and Petaling Jaya MP Maria Chin Abdullah) have called on the government to not ignore online sexual harassment and immediately act against such threats. They also highlighted the urgency of having comprehensive legislation for sexual harassment as there is currently no specific guideline pertaining to sexual harassment in the Communications and Multimedia Act 1998. However, there are provisions to address general threats, and abusive and offensive language and conduct online. PDRM confirmed that the case was being looked into under Section 507 of the Penal Code (anonymous criminal intimidation) and Section 233 of the Communications and Multimedia Act 1998 (sharing of offensive and menacing content).

=== Student calls out a teacher's rape joke (April 2021) ===
Ain Husniza Saiful Nizam, a 17-year-old student called out her teacher via a TikTok video after he allegedly joked about rape in her class while teaching about sexual harassment and abuse. She launched her campaign to make schools safer from such behaviours using #MakeSchoolASaferPlace hashtag. She received both support and backlash for highlighting rape culture in schools. The BBC produced a short video on the issue, highlighting the difficulties children generally face in challenging inappropriate behaviour and harassment from adults, and the willingness of institutions to address it.

After the police had updated her case as requiring "No Further Action", Ain Husniza was served with a defamation suit from the teacher who sought damages of RM 1 million. Civil societies under the Joint Action Group for Gender Equality (JAGE) denounced the legal action, claiming that "defamation suits are yet another weapon utilised by perpetrators to cow victims into submission" and victims are not only vulnerable to "retraumatisation, but also further harassment and unnecessary scrutiny". While minors can be sued under Malaysian law, JAGE claims that it will set a "dangerous legal precedent". Police are currently investigating the teenager under Section 504 of the Penal Code for insulting with the intention to provoke public peace.

== See also ==
- Sexual harassment in the military
- Sexual harassment in education
- Sexism and video games
