= Wong Chen =

Malaysian politician

- 黄基全
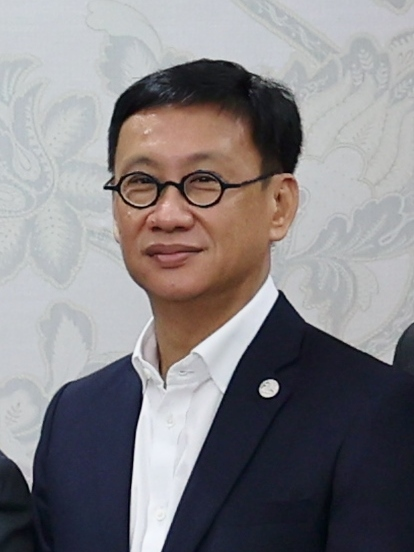
- Wong in 2024

Non-executive Chairman of the Malaysia Debt Ventures Berhad
- In office 23 May 2023 – 31 May 2026
- Minister: Anwar Ibrahim (Minister of Finance); Amir Hamzah Azizan (Minister of Finance II)
- Chief Executive Officer: Nizam Mohamed Nadzri

Chairman of the International Relations and Trade Select Committee
- In office 23 May 2023 – 10 August 2026
- Monarchs: Abdullah (2023–2024); Ibrahim Iskandar (2024–2026)
- Prime Minister: Anwar Ibrahim
- Constituency: Subang
- In office 5 December 2019 – 18 May 2020
- Monarch: Abdullah
- Prime Minister: Mahathir Mohamad (2019–2020); Muhyiddin Yassin (Mar–May 2020)
- Constituency: Subang

Member of the Malaysian Parliament for Subang
- In office 9 May 2018 – 10 August 2026
- Preceded by: Sivarasa Rasiah (PR–PKR)
- Majority: 92,353 (2018); 115,074 (2022)

Member of the Malaysian Parliament for Kelana Jaya
- In office 5 May 2013 – 9 May 2018
- Preceded by: Loh Gwo Burne (PR–PKR)
- Succeeded by: Position abolished
- Majority: 28,827 (2013)

Personal details
- Born: Wong Chen; 18 December 1968 (age 57) Petaling Jaya, Selangor, Malaysia
- Party: People's Justice Party (PKR) (2009-2026); Malaysian United Party (BERSAMA) (since 2026)
- Other political affiliations: Pakatan Rakyat (PR) (2009–2015); Pakatan Harapan (PH) (2015-2026)
- Education: United World College of South East Asia; University of Warwick
- Occupation: Politician
- Profession: Lawyer
- Committees: Select Committee for Finance and Economy
- Website: wongchen.com

Wong Chen (simplified Chinese: 黄基全; traditional Chinese: 黃基全; pinyin: Huáng Jīqúan; born 18 December 1968) is a Malaysian politician and lawyer. He was the Member of Parliament (MP) for Subang from May 2018 to August 2026, and Kelana Jaya from May 2013 to May 2018. He is a member of the Malaysian United Party (BERSAMA).

He was Chairman of the International Relations and Trade Select Committee twice while an MP, from December 2019 to May 2020 and May 2023 to August 2026. He also served as the Non-executive Chairman of the Malaysia Debt Ventures Berhad (MDV) from May 2023 to May 2026, and was a member of the Finance and Economy Select Committee.

A former member of the People's Justice Party (PKR), he was one of the party's chief policymakers related to the economy. He resigned from the party following an intra-party dispute in August 2026.

== Political career ==
While a member of the People's Justice Party (PKR), he headed its investment and trade bureau, where he often questioned the government's financial decisions. He was characterised by the Financial Times as a "rising star" within the party, and was responsible for crafting the party's economic policies and manifestos.

He made his electoral debut in the 2013 Malaysian general election, where he won the seat of Kelana Jaya. He continued to speak on the wide variety of issues including GST, 1MDB and also the general economic landscape of the country. As an MP he also gave views on social and human rights issues including Prevention of Terrorism Act and the Sedition Act.

Reported in the media as a member of Rafizi Ramli's faction within the PKR, he was elected to the party's central leadership council in 2022. Following Rafizi's resignation from the party and take-over of the Malaysian United Party (BERSAMA) in May 2026, an event Wong publicly attended, his access to the government-managed portal for accessing constituency funding allocation was revoked. He cited this, along with PKR's political direction and handling of issues such as corruption as contributing to his decision to resign as a member of parliament for Subang on 10 August 2026. He resigned from PKR the next day.

He joined BERSAMA on 12 August 2026.

== Election results ==
Parliament of Malaysia
| Year | Constituency | Candidate | Votes | Pct | Opponent(s) | Votes | Pct | Ballots cast | Majority | Turnout |
|---|---|---|---|---|---|---|---|---|---|---|
| 2013 | P104 Kelana Jaya | Wong Chen (PKR) | 56,790 | 66.72% | Loh Seng Kok (MCA) | 27,963 | 32.85% | 86,571 | 28,827 | 85.44% |
| 2013 | P104 Kelana Jaya | Wong Chen (PKR) | 56,790 | 66.72% | Toh Sin Wah (IND) | 363 | 0.43% | 86,571 | 28,827 | 85.44% |
| 2018 | P104 Subang | Wong Chen (PKR) | 104,430 | 83.08% | Tan Seong Lim (MCA) | 12,077 | 9.61% | 126,883 | 92,353 | 86.66% |
| 2018 | P104 Subang | Wong Chen (PKR) | 104,430 | 83.08% | Mohd Shahir Mohd Adnan (IKATAN) | 9,025 | 7.18% | 126,883 | 92,353 | 86.66% |
| 2018 | P104 Subang | Wong Chen (PKR) | 104,430 | 83.08% | Toh Sin Wah (IND) | 173 | 0.14% | 126,883 | 92,353 | 86.66% |
| 2022 | P104 Subang | Wong Chen (PKR) | 138,259 | 77.68% | Ang Hiang Ni (Gerakan) | 23,185 | 13.03% | 179,578 | 115,074 | 77.07% |
| 2022 | P104 Subang | Wong Chen (PKR) | 138,259 | 77.68% | Kow Cheong Wei (MCA) | 16,539 | 9.29% | 179,578 | 115,074 | 77.07% |

== Honours ==
=== Honours of Malaysia ===
- Malaysia
  - Recipient of the 17th Yang di-Pertuan Agong Installation Medal (2024)

Political offices
| New creation | Chairperson of International Relations and Trade Select Committee; 4 December 2019–present | Incumbent |
Parliament of Malaysia
| Preceded by Sivarasa Rasiah | Member of Parliament for Subang; 10 May 2018–present | Incumbent |
| Preceded by Loh Gwo Burne | Member of Parliament for Kelana Jaya; 5 May 2013–9 May 2018 | Constituency abolished |
