= Sungai Buloh (federal constituency) =

Federal constituency of Selangor, Malaysia

Sungai Buloh (P107)
Selangor constituency

Federal constituency
- Legislature: Dewan Rakyat
- MP: Ramanan Ramakrishnan; PH
- Constituency created: 2018
- First contested: 2018
- Last contested: 2022

Demographics
- Population (2020): 347,092
- Electors (2023): 162,693
- Area (km²): 133
- Pop. density (per km²): 2,609.7

Sungai Buloh is a federal constituency in Gombak District, Petaling District and Kuala Selangor District, Selangor, Malaysia, that has been represented in the Dewan Rakyat since 2018.

The federal constituency was created from parts of the Subang constituency in the 2018 redistribution and is mandated to return a single member to the Dewan Rakyat under the first past the post voting system.

== Demographics ==
Ethnic breakdown of Sungai Buloh's electorate as of 2022
1. Malay (62.8%)
2. Chinese (20.6%)
3. Indian (10.3%)
4. Other ethnicities (6.26%)
Age breakdown of Sungai Buloh's electorate as of 2022
1. 18-20 (9.64%)
2. 21-29 (26.9%)
3. 30-39 (21.2%)
4. 40-49 (16.9%)
5. 50-59 (13.9%)
6. 60-69 (7.84%)
7. 70-79 (2.75%)
8. 80-89 (0.65%)
9. above 90 (0.12%)
Gender breakdown of Sungai Buloh's electorate as of 2022
1. Male (50.1%)
2. Female (49.9%)

== History ==
=== Polling districts ===
According to the gazette issued on18 July 2023, the Sungai Buloh constituency has a total of 28 polling districts.

State constituency	Polling districts	Code	Location
Paya Jaras（N38）	Petempatan Sungai Buloh	107/38/01	SK Sungai Buloh
Paya Jaras（N38）	Bandar Baru Sungai Buloh Utara	107/38/02	KAFA Integrasi Al-Ikhwan Bandar Baru Sungai Buloh
Paya Jaras（N38）	Bukit Rahman Putra	107/38/03	SK Bukit Rahman Putra
Paya Jaras（N38）	Merbau Sempak	107/38/04	Pintu 3 SK Merbau Sempak
Paya Jaras（N38）	Paya Jaras	107/38/05	SRA Paya Jaras
Paya Jaras（N38）	Bandar Baru Sungai Buloh Selatan	107/38/06	SK Bandar Baru Sungai Buloh
Paya Jaras（N38）	Sungai Pelong	107/38/07	SK Sungai Pelong
Paya Jaras（N38）	Paya Jaras Hilir	107/38/08	Dewan MBSA Seri Pagi Kampung Paya Jaras U19
Paya Jaras（N38）	Matang Pagar	107/38/09	SMK Bukit Rahman Putra
Paya Jaras（N38）	Kubu Gajah	107/38/10	Pintu 1 SK Merbau Sempak
Paya Jaras（N38）	Taman Saujana Utama	107/38/11	SMK Saujana Utama
Kota Damansara（N39）	Kampung Baharu Sungai Buloh Sekolah	107/39/01	SJK (C) Kampung Baharu Sungai Buloh
Kota Damansara（N39）	RRI Sungai Buloh	107/39/02	SJK (T) R.R.I Sungai Buloh
Kota Damansara（N39）	Pinggiran Subang	107/39/03	SK Subang Bestari
Kota Damansara（N39）	Taman Subang Baru	107/39/04	SMK Subang
Kota Damansara（N39）	Kampung Melayu Subang	107/39/05	SRA Islam Kampung Melayu Subang
Kota Damansara（N39）	Subang Perdana	107/39/06	SK Jalan U3
Kota Damansara（N39）	Kota Damansara Seksyen 4 Dan 5	107/39/07	SMK Seksyen 8 Kota Damansara
Kota Damansara（N39）	LTSSAAS Subang	107/39/08	Asia Pacific Schools
Kota Damansara（N39）	Kampung Baharu Subang	107/39/09	SJK (C) Subang
Kota Damansara（N39）	Kota Damansara Seksyen 7	107/39/10	SK Seksyen 7 Kota Damansara
Kota Damansara（N39）	Kampung Baharu Sungai Buloh Dewan	107/39/11	SJK (C) Kampung Baharu Sungai Buloh
Kota Damansara（N39）	Jalan Merbau Kampung Melayu Subang	107/39/12	SK Subang
Kota Damansara（N39）	Mutiara Subang	107/39/13	SMK Subang Bestari; SK Subang Bestari (2)
Kota Damansara（N39）	Kota Damansara Seksyen 6	107/39/14	SK Seksyen 6 Kota Damansara
Kota Damansara（N39）	Kota Damansara Seksyen 8 Dan 9	107/39/15	SK Seksyen 9 Kota Damansara
Kota Damansara（N39）	Kota Damansara Seksyen 10 Dan 11	107/39/16	SK Seksyen 11 Kota Damansara
Kota Damansara（N39）	Kem Sungai Buloh	107/39/17	Dewan MBSA Kampung Baru Sungai Buloh

=== Representation history ===
Members of Parliament for Sungai Buloh
Parliament	No	Years	Member	Party	Vote Share
Constituency created from Subang and Kuala Selangor
14th	P107	2018–2022	Sivarasa Rasiah (சிவராசா ராசையா)	PH (PKR)	43,631; 55.97%
15th	P107	2022–present	Ramanan Ramakrishnan (ரமணன் ராமகிருஷ்ணன்)	PH (PKR)	50,943; 39.30%

=== State constituency ===
Parliamentary constituency	State constituency						
Parliamentary constituency	1955–59*	1959–1974	1974–1986	1986–1995	1995–2004	2004–2018	2018–present
Sungai Buloh							Kota Damansara
Sungai Buloh							Paya Jaras

=== Historical boundaries ===
State constituency	Area
State constituency	2018
Kota Damansara	Kampung Baru Sungai Buloh; Kampung Melayu Subang; Kota Damansara; Kwasa Damansara; Pekan Subang
Paya Jaras	Bukit Rahman Putra; Merbau Sempak; Sungai Buloh; Sungai Pelong; Taman Saujana Utama

=== Current state assembly members ===
No.	State constituency	Member	Coalition (party)
N38	Paya Jaras	Ab Halim Tamuri	PN (PAS)
N39	Kota Damansara	Muhammad Izuan Ahmad Kasim	PH (PKR)

=== Local governments & postcodes ===
No.	State Constituency	Local Government	Postcode
N38	Paya Jaras	Shah Alam City Council (Paya Jaras, Bukit Rahman Putra, Bandar Baru Sungai Buloh - Sections U18-U20); Kuala Selangor Municipal Council (Taman Saujana Utama Area); Selayang Municipal Council (Petempatan Sungai Buloh Area)	40150, 40160 Shah Alam; 42300 Puncak Alam; 47000 Sungai Buloh; 47200 Subang Airport; 47410, 47800, 47810 Petaling Jaya; 48020 Rawang
N39	Kota Damansara	Shah Alam City Council (Subang and LTSAAS Areas - Sections U3-U6); Petaling Jaya City Council	40150, 40160 Shah Alam; 42300 Puncak Alam; 47000 Sungai Buloh; 47200 Subang Airport; 47410, 47800, 47810 Petaling Jaya; 48020 Rawang

== Election results ==
Malaysian general election, 2022
Party	Candidate	Votes	%	∆%
PH	Ramanan Ramakrishnan	50,943	39.30	▲39.30
BN	Khairy Jamaluddin	48,250	37.22	▲15.82
PN	Mohd Ghazali Md Hamin	29,060	22.42	▲22.42
PEJUANG	Mohd Akmal Mohd Yusoff	829	0.64	▲0.64
Parti Rakyat Malaysia	Ahmad Jufliz Faizal	279	0.22	▲0.22
Independent	Syed Razak Alsagoff	165	0.13	▲0.13
Independent	Nurhaslinda Basri	113	0.09	▲0.09
Total valid votes		129,639	100.00	
Total rejected ballots		945		
Unreturned ballots		262		
Turnout		130,846	82.00	▼4.95
Registered electors		158,090		
Majority		2,693	2.08	▼32.09
PH hold		Swing		
Source(s) https://lom.agc.gov.my/ilims/upload/portal/akta/outputp/1753283/PUB612.pdf

Malaysian general election, 2018
Party	Candidate	Votes	%
PKR	Sivarasa Rasiah	43,631	55.97
PAS	Nuridah Mohd Salleh	16,997	21.80
BN	Pakas Rao Applanaidoo	16,681	21.40
Parti Sosialis Malaysia	Zainurizzaman Moharam	642	0.82
Total valid votes		77,951	100.00
Total rejected ballots		686	
Unreturned ballots		237	
Turnout		78,874	86.95
Registered electors		90,707	
Majority		26,634	34.17
This was a new constituency created.
Source(s) "His Majesty's Government Gazette - Notice of Contested Election, Parliament for the State of Selangor [P.U. (B) 239/2018]" (PDF). Attorney General's Chambers of Malaysia. 3 May 2018. "Federal Government Gazette - Results of Contested Election and Statements of the Poll after the Official Addition of Votes, Parliamentary Constituencies for the State of Selangor [P.U. (B) 313/2018]" (PDF). Attorney General's Chambers of Malaysia. 28 May 2018.
