= Subang Jaya (state constituency) =

Constituency in Selangor, Malaysia

Subang Jaya (N31)
Selangor constituency

State constituency
- Legislature: Selangor State Legislative Assembly
MLA
Michelle Ng Mei Sze
PH
- Constituency created: 1994
- First contested: 1995
- Last contested: 2023

Demographics
- Electors (2023): 111,970

Subang Jaya is a state constituency in Selangor, Malaysia, that has been represented in the Selangor State Legislative Assembly since 1995.

The state constituency was created in the 1994 redistribution and is mandated to return a single member to the Selangor State Legislative Assembly under the first past the post voting system.

== Demographics ==
Ethnic breakdown of Subang Jaya's electorate as of 2023
1. Chinese (55.2%)
2. Malay (27.3%)
3. Indian (13.8%)
4. Other ethnicities (3.60%)

== History ==
=== Polling districts ===
According to the federal gazette issued on 30 March 2018, the Subang Jaya constituency is divided into 26 polling districts.

State constituency	Polling Districts	Code	Location
Subang Jaya (N31）	PJS 7 Bandar Sunway	104/32/01	SMK Bandar Sunway
Subang Jaya (N31）	SS 12	104/32/02	Sekolah Sri Kuala Lumpur
Subang Jaya (N31）	SS 15	104/32/03	Sekolah Integrasi Masjid Darul Ehsan
Subang Jaya (N31）	SS 16 & SS 17	104/32/04	SMK SS17
Subang Jaya (N31）	SS 19/1	104/32/05	SK SS17
Subang Jaya (N31）	SS 18	104/32/06	SMK Subang Utama
Subang Jaya (N31）	SS 14/1-4	104/32/07	SK Subang Jaya
Subang Jaya (N31）	SS 13	104/32/08	SMK Subang Jaya
Subang Jaya (N31）	USJ 1	104/32/09	SJK (C) Chee Wen
Subang Jaya (N31）	USJ 2/1-4	104/32/10	SK USJ2
Subang Jaya (N31）	USJ 3	104/32/11	SK Seri Selangor
Subang Jaya (N31）	USJ 4	104/32/12	SMK USJ4
Subang Jaya (N31）	USJ 5	104/32/13	SMA Bestari
Subang Jaya (N31）	USJ 6	104/32/14	SK Seafield
Subang Jaya (N31）	USJ 7 & 8	104/32/15	SMK USJ8
Subang Jaya (N31）	USJ 9 & USJ 10	104/32/16	SK Seafield 3
Subang Jaya (N31）	USJ 11	104/32/17	SMK USJ12
Subang Jaya (N31）	USJ 12	104/32/18	SK USJ12
Subang Jaya (N31）	USJ 13	104/32/19	SMK USJ13
Subang Jaya (N31）	USJ 14 & 15	104/32/20	Kompleks Sekolah Wawasan SK Dato Onn Jaafar
Subang Jaya (N31）	SS 19/2 – SS 19/5	104/32/21	SK SS19
Subang Jaya (N31）	SS 19/6 – SS 19/19	104/32/22	SJK (C) Lick Hung
Subang Jaya (N31）	PJS 9 & 11 Bandar Sunway	104/32/23	SK Bandar Sunway
Subang Jaya (N31）	SS 14/5-8	104/32/24	SK Sri Subang Jaya
Subang Jaya (N31）	USJ 2/5-7	104/32/25	SMK Seafield
Subang Jaya (N31）	USJ 16 hingga 22	104/32/26	SK USJ20

=== Representation history ===
Members of the Legislative Assembly for Subang Jaya
Assembly	No	Years	Member	Party
Constituency created from Subang
9th	N34	1995-1999	Lee Hwa Beng (李華民)	BN (MCA)
10th	N34	1999-2004	Lee Hwa Beng (李華民)	BN (MCA)
11th	N31	2004-2008	Lee Hwa Beng (李華民)	BN (MCA)
12th	N31	2008-2013	Hannah Yeoh Tseow Suan (楊巧雙)	PR (DAP)
13th	N31	2013-2015	Hannah Yeoh Tseow Suan (楊巧雙)	PR (DAP)
13th	N31	2015-2018	Hannah Yeoh Tseow Suan (楊巧雙)	PH (DAP)
14th	N31	2018-2023	Michelle Ng Mei Sze (黃美詩)	PH (DAP)
15th	N31	2023–present	Michelle Ng Mei Sze (黃美詩)	PH (DAP)

== Election results ==
Selangor state election, 2023
Party	Candidate	Votes	%	∆%
PH	Michelle Ng Mei Sze	60,364	81.23	▼7.10
PN	Gana Pragasam Sebastian	9,173	12.35	▲12.35
MUDA	Zayd Shaukat	4,749	6.39	▲6.39
Total valid votes		74,286	100.00	
Total rejected ballots		213		
Unreturned ballots		174		
Turnout		74,673	66.69	▼18.87
Registered electors		111,900		
Majority		51,191	68.88	▼8.15
PH hold		Swing		

Selangor state election, 2018
Party	Candidate	Votes	%	∆%
PKR	Michelle Ng Mei Sze	55,354	88.33	▲88.33
BN	Chong Ah Watt	7,082	11.30	▼12.05
Independent	Toh Sin Wah	228	0.36	▲0.36
Total valid votes		62,664	100.00	
Total rejected ballots		332		
Unreturned ballots		336		
Turnout		63,332	85.56	▼0.66
Registered electors		74,023		
Majority		48,272	77.03	▲23.73
PKR hold		Swing		

Selangor state election, 2013
Party	Candidate	Votes	%	∆%
DAP	Hannah Yeoh Tseow Suan	40,366	76.65	▲5.71
BN	Gan Meng Foo	12,297	23.35	▼5.71
Total valid votes		52,663	100.00	
Total rejected ballots		389		
Unreturned ballots		134		
Turnout		53,186	86.22	▲11.13
Registered electors		61,688		
Majority		28,069	53.30	▼11.42
DAP hold		Swing		
Source(s) "Federal Government Gazette - Notice of Contested Election, State Legislative Assembly for the State of Selangor [P.U. (B) 192/2013]" (PDF). Attorney General's Chambers of Malaysia. 26 April 2013. "Federal Government Gazette - Results of Contested Election and Statements of the Poll after the Official Addition of Votes, State Constituencies for the State of Selangor [P.U. (B) 233/2013]" (PDF). Attorney General's Chambers of Malaysia. 22 May 2013.

Selangor state election, 2008
Party	Candidate	Votes	%	∆%
DAP	Hannah Yeoh Tseow Suan	23,459	70.94	▲70.94
BN	Ong Chong Swen @ Ong Chong Siew	9,608	29.06	▲29.06
Total valid votes		33,067	100.00	
Total rejected ballots		345		
Unreturned ballots		53		
Turnout		33,465	75.09	
Registered electors		44,569		
Majority		13,851	41.88	
DAP gain from BN		Swing		?

Selangor state election, 2004
Party	Candidate	Votes	%	∆%
On the nomination day, Lee Hwa Beng won uncontested.
BN	Lee Hwa Beng			
Total valid votes			100.00	
Total rejected ballots				
Unreturned ballots				
Turnout				
Registered electors		38,606		
Majority				
BN hold		Swing		

Selangor state election, 1999
Party	Candidate	Votes	%	∆%
BN	Lee Hwa Beng	15,701	64.07	▼16.04
DAP	Ong Ing Siong	8,806	35.93	▲35.93
Total valid votes		24,507	100.00	
Total rejected ballots		344		
Unreturned ballots		27		
Turnout		24,878	76.11	▲3.01
Registered electors		32,688		
Majority		6,895	28.14	▼32.08
BN hold		Swing		

Selangor state election, 1995
Party	Candidate	Votes	%
BN	Lee Hwa Beng	14,407	80.11
S46	A. Ghani Harun	3,578	19.89
Total valid votes		17,985	100.00
Total rejected ballots		326	
Unreturned ballots		52	
Turnout		18,363	73.10
Registered electors		25,119	
Majority		10,829	60.22
This was a new constituency created.
