= Michelle Ng =

Malaysian politician (born 1990)

Yang Berhormat Puan Michelle Ng MLA
- 黄美诗
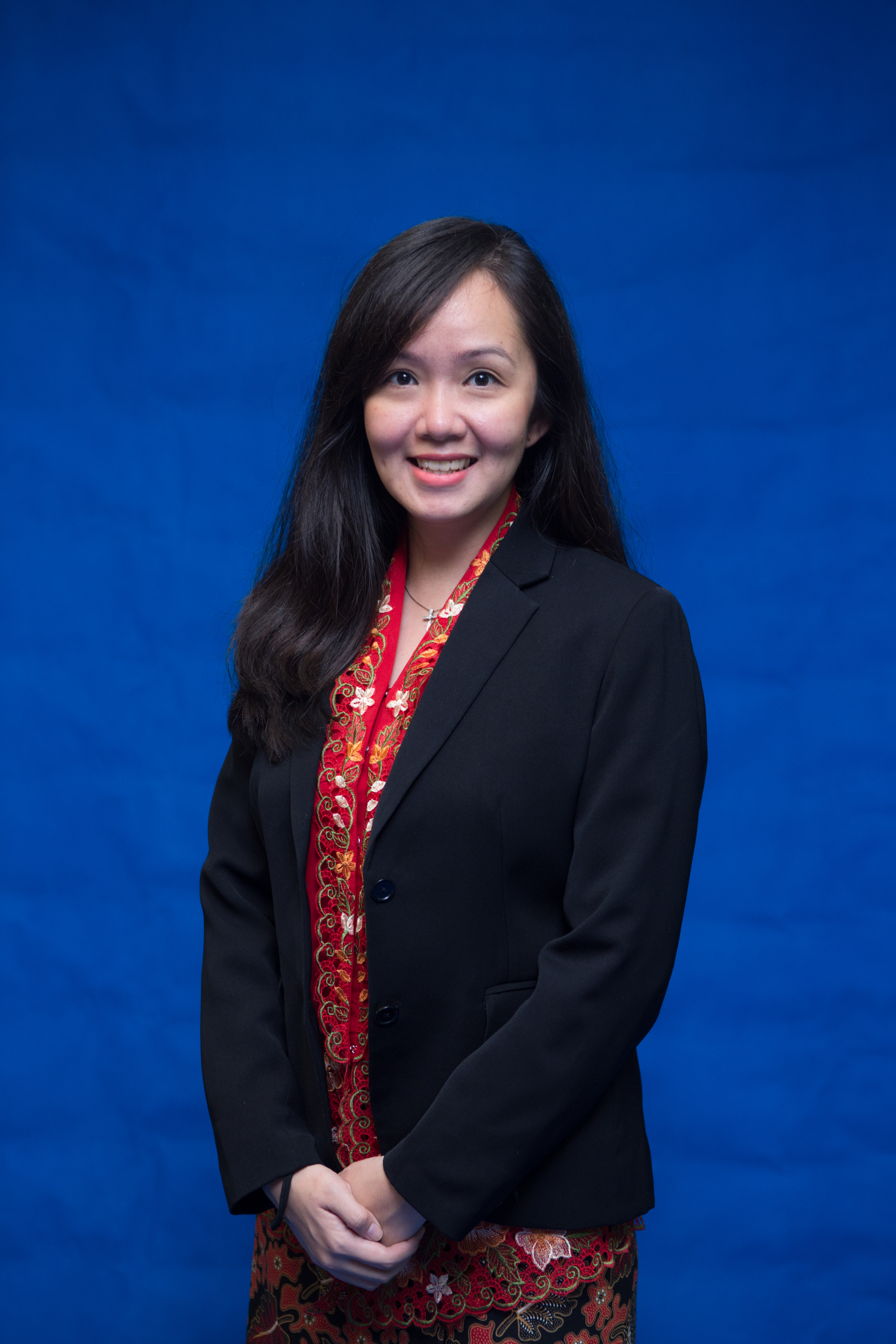
- Michelle Ng

Political Secretary to the Minister of Digital
- Incumbent
- Assumed office 6 June 2025
- Monarch: Ibrahim
- Prime Minister: Anwar Ibrahim
- Minister: Gobind Singh Deo
- Preceded by: Suresh Singh

Member of the Selangor State Legislative Assembly for Subang Jaya
- Incumbent
- Assumed office 9 May 2018
- Preceded by: Hannah Yeoh (PR–DAP)
- Majority: 48,272 (2018); 51,191 (2023)

Personal details
- Born: Michelle Ng Mei Sze; 7 April 1990 (age 36) Kuantan, Pahang, Malaysia
- Party: Democratic Action Party (DAP)
- Other political affiliations: Pakatan Harapan (PH)
- Education: London School of Economics
- Occupation: Politician
- Profession: Lawyer
- Website: www.michellengmeisze.com

Michelle Ng Mei Sze (simplified Chinese: 黄美诗; traditional Chinese: 黃美詩; pinyin: Huáng Měishī; Pe̍h-ōe-jī: N̂g Bí-si; born 7 April 1990) is a Malaysian politician who has served as Member of the Selangor State Legislative Assembly (MLA) for Subang Jaya since May 2018. She has also been appointed as the Political Secretary to the Minister of Digital, YB Gobind Singh Deo. She is a member of Democratic Action Party (DAP), a component party of the Pakatan Harapan (PH) coalition. She also serves as a Committee Member in DAP Selangor and the Secretary of the Legal Bureau of DAP.

== Early life ==
Michelle completed her Bachelor of Laws (LL.B.) at the London School of Economics on a Maxis Scholarship. She was also admitted as a barrister-at-law with Inner Temple. Prior to that, Michelle completed her A-levels with HELP University on a Student Achiever's Scholarship Award. She obtained her secondary and primary school education from Catholic High School, Petaling Jaya and Sekolah Jenis Kebangsaan (C) Yoke Nam respectively.

== Early career ==
Michelle Ng is a lawyer. She formerly practiced as a litigation lawyer with particular interest in constitutional, human rights and public interest litigation. She was a legal associate with Sreenevasan Young before joining Gobind Singh Deo & Co, the former law firm of Gobind Singh Deo, Member of Parliament (MP) of Malaysia for Puchong.

== Political career ==
=== Selangor State Legislative Assembly ===
==== Election ====
2018

In 2018, Michelle was fielded for the first time to contest on a DAP ticket under the Subang Jaya constituency for the Selangor State Assembly in the 14th General Elections, where she won 88.3% of the constituents’ votes with a 48,272 majority, making her one of the youngest representatives to be elected into the Selangor State Assembly at the age of 28.

2023

Michelle was re-elected in 2023 with 81.03% of the votes with a 51,191 majority in a 3-corner electoral race against Zayd Shaukat from MUDA and Gana Pragasam Sebastian from Perikatan Nasional.

==== Tenure ====
Having lobbied intensively for improvement in water works, the Special Select Committee on Selangor Water Resource was reinstated during the March 2020 State Assembly sitting where Michelle was made the Chairlady. Michelle is also the Publicity Secretary of the DAP Women's Selangor State Committee.

Michelle lobbied extensively for water sector reforms which increase oversight towards Selangor's water resources. She also successfully lobbied the state government to improve access to the criminal justice system through the Selangor Legal Aid Fund. She also took keen interest in mental health care access and lobbied to better subsidise mental health care and decriminalisation suicide attempts. She also helped bringing back the mini van into the public transport system by implementing in Subang Jaya Selangor's first on-demand van hailing service through Kumpool.

== Personal life ==
Michelle is married to Tan Cheng Leong. They are parents to a son, who was born on 21 April 2022.

On 3 June 2023, Michelle launched her first book, "Beneath Calm Waters", which chronicles her struggle in finding her feet to invoke change from a tightrope act as a state government backbencher. In this book, she provides a raw account of the highs and lows in her journey of pushing for systemic reforms, many of which were inspired by issues addressed through community work.

== Election results ==
Selangor State Legislative Assembly
Year	Constituency	Candidate	Votes	Pct	Opponent(s)	Votes	Pct	Ballots cast	Majority	Turnout
2018	N31 Subang Jaya	Michelle Ng Mei Sze (DAP)	55,354	88.33%	Chong Ah Watt (MCA)	7,082	11.30%	62,664	48,272	85.56%
2018	N31 Subang Jaya	Michelle Ng Mei Sze (DAP)	55,354	88.33%	Toh Sin Wah (IND)	228	0.36%	62,664	48,272	85.56%
2023	N31 Subang Jaya	Michelle Ng Mei Sze (DAP)	60,364	81.03%	Gana Pragasam Sebastian (BERSATU)	9,173	12.31%	74,493	51,191	66.53%
2023	N31 Subang Jaya	Michelle Ng Mei Sze (DAP)	60,364	81.03%	Zayd Shaukat (MUDA)	4,749	6.38%	74,493	51,191	66.53%

== See also ==
- Subang Jaya (state constituency)
