= Domestic inquiry =

Evidence gathering by an employer against its employee

A domestic inquiry, in the context of human resource management, is a search for truth, facts, or circumstances concerning charges alleged by the employer against its employee. It is an inquiry created by the management against its own employee against who allegedly committed certain acts of misconduct. The process begins after the issuance of the so-called "show cause" letter to the employee accused of committing the infraction. Once the response to the letter was deemed unsatisfactory, the domestic inquiry can then commence.

Objectivity is guaranteed in the inquiry and this is demonstrated in the way the employee is allowed full opportunity to present his case, including the evidence to support his arguments. In addition, the process is also recorded while the investigating officers must not be related to the incident or the individuals involved. There are countries that enacted laws that cover domestic inquiry. For example, it is included in Section 75(1) of the Indian Industrial Relation Bill, which limits the domestic inquiry to 90 days.

The domestic inquiry does not pass judgment or mete out punishment since it is merely a fact-finding exercise. Furthermore, its findings can also be questioned by the employee on all grounds available to him in law and on facts. On the other hand, the management can defend its action later on by citing that a proper domestic inquiry was conducted.
