= Sharifah Mazlina =

Malaysian explorer

Sharifah Mazlina binti Syed Abdul Kadir (born 23 May 1965) is a Malaysian woman solo explorer and Universiti Teknologi Mara lecturer. In 2004, she became the first Asian woman to travel to the South Pole. She reached the North Pole in 2007.

== Controversies ==
Sharifah Mazlina received the title of 'Darjah Mahkota Johor Yang Amat Mulia Pangkat Pertama Dato' Sri Paduka Mahkota Johor (SPMJ)' in November 2005 and 'Pangkat Kedua Dato' Paduka Mahkota Johor (DPMJ)' in March 2004.

On 18 December 2019, Johor Royal court council stated her titles were revoked by Sultan of Johor since 2010 thus she no longer has the right to use it.
