= Malaysia Debt Ventures =

Government-owned financial services company

Malaysia Debt Ventures Berhad
- Type: State-owned enterprise
- Industry: Finance
- Founded: 2002
- Headquarters: Unit 13.01, Level 13, Menara AIA Cap Square, No. 10, Jalan Munshi Abdullah, 50100 Kuala Lumpur.
- Key people: Wong Chen, Non-executive Chairman; Rizal Fauzi, Chief Executive Officer; Adrian Khor, Chief Financial Officer; Sharul Sazman Samaan, Chief Business Officer; Yashvin Metha Vythy, Chief Strategy Officer; Ahmad Shukri Abd Rahman, Chief Risk Officer
- Parent: Minister of Finance Incorporated
- Website: www.mdv.com.my

Malaysia Debt Ventures Berhad (MDV) was established by the Government of Malaysia in 2002 with the objective of providing financing facilities to develop the Information and Communications Technology (ICT) sector that had been identified and prioritised by the Government as the catalyst for the nation's growth.

As the nation developed, MDV's financing mandate was concurrently extended to serve other high-impact and technology-driven sectors of the economy prioritised by the Government, including Green Technology, Biotechnology, Strategic and Emerging technology, and start-ups.

MDV also offers conventional and Shariah compliant financing solutions that cater to the requirements of young technology-based companies and start-ups with innovative products and/or services as well as sustainable business propositions, who are generally underserved by commercial financial institutions, namely credit financing for young technology-based companies. This includes Venture Debt financing for startups, for which MDV is the pioneering and largest local provider of this type of debt financing, typically used as complementary financing to equity venture capital. Venture Debt provides startups with credit financing to extend their growth runway while minimising equity dilution.

As one of the few financiers in Malaysia solely focused on technology-driven companies, MDV will continue to play a vital role in supporting the Government's initiatives and aspiration to promote high-value technology and innovation as a path towards a high-income nation.
