= 2018 Selangor state election =

Malaysian state legislative election

- 9 May 2018

All 56 seats in the Selangor State Legislative Assembly 29 seats needed for a majority
- Registered: 2,415,074
- Turnout: 2,074,891 (85.91%)
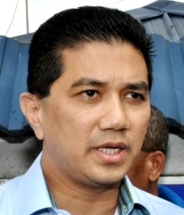
	Majority party	Minority party	Third party
		BN	GS
Leader	Azmin Ali	Noh Omar	Sallehen Mukhyi
Party	Pakatan Harapan (PKR)	Barisan Nasional (UMNO)	Gagasan Sejahtera (PAS)
Leader since	8 March 2008	25 April 1995	2004
Leader's seat	Bukit Antarabangsa	Not contesting (MP of Tanjong Karang)	Sabak (lost seat)
Last election	29 seats, 38.8% (Pakatan Rakyat) (Note: Excludes PAS and PSM, which was part of the Pakatan Rakyat coalition in the 2013 election but subsequently left in 2015, resulting in Pakatan Harapan being formed by DAP and PKR, later joined by BERSATU and Amanah for this election. The original number of seats and vote share held by the then Pakatan Rakyat as it was in 2013 was 44 seats and 59.9%, respectively.)	12 Seats, 39.4%	15 seats, 20.8% (Pakatan Rakyat) (Note: PAS was previously part of Pakatan Rakyat until 2015, leaving to form Gagasan Sejahtera.)
Seats before	29	11	13
Seats won	51	4	1
Seat change	▲22	▼7	▼12
Popular vote	1,303,102	450,742	296,250
Percentage	63.37%	21.92%	14.41%
Swing	▲24.6	▼17.5	▼6.4
- Results by constituency
Menteri Besar Selangor before election
Mohamed Azmin Ali
Pakatan Harapan
(PKR)
Menteri Besar Selangor-designate
Mohamed Azmin Ali
Pakatan Harapan
(PKR)

The 14th Selangor state election was held on 9 May 2018 to elect the State Assemblymen of the 14th Selangor State Legislative Assembly, the legislature of the Malaysian state of Selangor.

The Selangor State Legislative Assembly was dissolved in a simple ceremony on 9 April 2018 by Sharafuddin of Selangor. Alternatively, the legislative would automatically dissolve on 21 June 2018, the fifth anniversary of the first sitting, and elections must be held within sixty days (two months) of the dissolution (on or before 21 August 2018, with the date to be decided by the Election Commission of Malaysia), if it was not dissolved prior to that date by the Head of State, Sultan of Selangor on the advice of the Head of Government, Menteri Besar of Selangor.

The election was conducted by the Malaysian Election Commission and utilised the first-past-the-post system. Electoral candidates were nominated on 28 April. On 9 May, between 8.00 a.m. and 5.00 p.m. Malaysian time (UTC+8), polling was held in all 56 state constituencies throughout Selangor; each constituency elects a single State Assemblyman to the state legislature.

The incumbent Pakatan Harapan (PH) government won a supermajority of 51 seats in a landslide, securing a third term in government. The opposition Barisan Nasional won 4 seats while Gagasan Sejahtera won 1 seat. Azmin Ali returned as the Menteri Besar of Selangor before releasing his position a little over a month later to take the position in the Cabinet of Malaysia as the Minister of Economic Affairs. Amirudin Shari succeeded him as the 16th Menteri Besar of Selangor and was sworn in on 19 June 2018.

== Background ==
The state election is the 14th state election in Selangor since the independence of Malaya (now Malaysia) in 1957. The governing Pakatan Harapan (PH) will seek to secure their third consecutive term in office since 2008. According to the Laws of the Constitution of Selangor 1959, the maximum term of the Selangor State Legislative Assembly, the legislature of Selangor, is five years from the date of the first sitting of Assembly following a state election, after which it is dissolved by operation of law. The Assembly would have been automatically dissolved on 21 June 2018, the fifth anniversary of its first sitting on 21 June 2013.

=== Electoral system ===
Each state constituencies of Selangor will elect one member to the Selangor State Legislative Assembly using the first-past-the-post voting system. If one party obtains a majority of seats, then that party is entitled to form the State Government, with its leader as Menteri Besar. If the election results in no single party having a majority, there is a hung assembly, of which will be dissolved under the royal prerogative of the Sultan.

The redistricting of electoral boundaries for the entire country had been presented to and passed by the Dewan Rakyat, and subsequently gazetted on 29 March 2018 after obtaining the royal consent of the Yang di-Pertuan Agong ahead of the 14th general election. Elections are conducted by the Election Commission of Malaysia (EC), which is under the jurisdiction of the Prime Minister's Department.

=== Voting Eligibility ===
To vote in the state election, one had to be:

- registered in the electoral roll as an elector in the constituency in which he resides on;
- aged 21 or over on the registration date;
- a resident of the constituency, or if not so, an absentee voter;
- not disqualified under any law relating to offences committed in connection with elections.

=== Electoral divisions ===
All 56 constituencies within Selangor, which constitute the Selangor State Legislative Assembly, were contested during the election.

Constituencies of Selangor State Legislative Assembly since 2018

== Timeline ==
The key dates are listed below in Malaysia Standard Time (GMT+8):

28 March	Prime Minister Najib Razak tabled the Election Commission's redelineation report in the Dewan Rakyat.
6 April	Najib Razak announced his intention to dissolve the Malaysian Parliament on the consent of Sultan Muhammad V, the Yang di-Pertuan Agong of Malaysia.
6 April	Menteri Besar Azmin Ali states that he will seek an audience with Selangor's Ruler Sultan Sharafuddin Idris Shah to obtain his consent to dissolve the Selangor State Legislative Assembly.
7 April	Formal dissolution of Parliament.
9 April	A simple ceremony to dissolve Selangor State Legislative Assembly was held at Balai Dewan Diraja, Istana Alam Shah. In attendance are the Sultan of Selangor, Sultan Sharafuddin Idris Shah, Raja Muda Selangor (the crown prince), Tengku Amir Shah, Mentri Besar of Selangor, Azmin Ali, Speaker of Selangor State Legislative Assembly, Hannah Yeoh and members of Selangor Council of the Royal Court.
10 April	Election Commission chairman Hashim Abdullah announced that the general election will take place on 9 May 2018.
28 April	Nomination process of candidates for the general election begins, and the deadline (10am) for the delivery of candidate nomination papers.
28 April	Official 11-day campaigning period begins.
5 May	Early voting begins.
9 May	Polling day.
10 May	Result of the election was announced in the early morning by the Election Commission of Malaysia with Pakatan Harapan (PH) winning 51 out of 56 seats in Selangor. Leader of PH in Selangor, Azmin Ali seeks audience with Sultan Sharafuddin Idris Shah to inform him of the result. The Sultan appoints Azmin Ali as the Menteri Besar.
11 May	Swearing in ceremony of the returning Menteri Besar of Selangor, Azmin Ali was held at Balairung Seri, Istana Alam Shah.
14 May	Swearing in ceremony of the new members of Selangor State Executive Council was held at Balairung Seri, Istana Alam Shah.

== Contenders ==
The incumbent party, Pakatan Harapan have decided to contest all 56 seats in Selangor. Malaysian United Indigenous Party (Bersatu) expressed their desire to contest in the 12 seats won by the Barisan Nasional in the last general election. National Trust Party (Amanah) will target to contest in 15 seats held by Pan-Malaysian Islamic Party (PAS) in the last general election. Pakatan Harapan will finalize the remaining 21 seats before 23 February 2018. On 8 March 2018, Pakatan Harapan has successfully finalized 50 seats. Pakatan Harapan has yet to finalize 6 seats. The seats are Sungai Panjang, Sungai Burong, Lembah Jaya, Dusun Tua, Seri Serdang and Kota Damansara.

The opposition Barisan Nasional (BN) is also set to contest all 56 seats in Selangor State Legislative Assembly. Barisan Nasional (BN) linchpin party United Malays National Organisation (UMNO) is to set to contest major share of Barisan Nasional (BN) seats. Gagasan Sejahtera also states that they will contest all 56 seats in Selangor. Pan-Malaysian Islamic Party (PAS) will compete for 42 seats, while Parti Sosialis Malaysia (PSM) will contest 5 seats in Semenyih, Bukit Lanjan, Kota Damansara, Pelabuhan Klang and Sri Muda.

=== Political parties ===
Coalition			Other parties
Incumbent	Opposition		Other parties
Pakatan Harapan (PH)	Gagasan Sejahtera (GS)	Barisan Nasional (BN)	Parti Rakyat Malaysia (PRM); Parti Sosialis Malaysia (PSM); People's Alternative Party (PAP)
People's Justice Party (PKR); Democratic Action Party (DAP); National Trust Party (Amanah); Malaysian United Indigenous Party (Bersatu)	Malaysian Islamic Party (PAS); Malaysia National Alliance Party (Ikatan)	United Malays National Organisation (UMNO); Malaysian Chinese Association (MCA); Parti Gerakan Rakyat Malaysia (Gerakan); Malaysian Indian Congress (MIC)	Parti Rakyat Malaysia (PRM); Parti Sosialis Malaysia (PSM); People's Alternative Party (PAP)

== Manifestos ==
Several parties launched specific manifestos for Selangor ahead of the state election.

=== Barisan Nasional ===
Barisan Nasional launches their manifestos on 8 April 2018. Using the theme, Better Selangor. Yakinlah. BN lebih baik! (English: Better Selangor. Rest assured. BN is better!), the manifestos consist of 10 programs, containing 100 initiatives focusing on the betterment of Selangorians.

#	Programs	Initiatives
1	High performance public service	Urban Transformation Centre (UTC) in all districts; Goods and Services Tax (GST) in government sector fully borne by the government; Re-aligning the direction of the state subsidiary; Empowering the state sharia court institution; Young local authorities members; Kuala Langat District Council (MDKL) and Kuala Selangor District Council (MDKS) upgraded to municipal councils; Klang Municipal Council (MPK) divided into MPK North and MPK South.; Special integrity panel to monitor the government and administration; Amend state-by laws and local authorities; Balance race composition of civil servants and make sure contract staff efficient in fixed service
2	Thriving, sustainable and innovative economy	Create entrepreneur transformation center; Special fund incentives for the establishment of community shop; RM 1 nominal fee when applying for hawker and small traders licenses; Special fund for small entrepreneurial capital aids; Development of west coast, north and south of Selangor; Create digital free market zone; Selangor as a logistic hub as a new economy source; Integrated Small and Medium Industries (IKS) hubs in rural areas; Transforming industrial zones, IKS and tourist sites; Imposing premiums under land value in program transforming illegal companies from agriculture to industrial; Special fund for Selangor Food Security program
3	Prosperous and affordable housing	PPR (Public Housing Program) houses become rent to own; 50,000 affordable houses to be built; Special housing program for M40 group; Special fund to fix old houses; 10 percent incentive when buying first houses under RM200,000; Abandoned project recovery
4	Excellent education and exemplary role models	Free primary school education; Special fund for Parents-Teachers Association; Free school bus services in PPR area; RM10,000 incentive to first class degree holder; Special help RM2,000 to higher education entrees; Special housing allowance to KAFA (Al-Quran and Fardhu 'Ain classes) teachers; Special fund for tahfiz school; Special fund for tertiary student rented houses
5	User-friendly infrastructures and basic amenities	Finalize the restructure of water supply industries; Offers free 20 cubic meters clean water supply per month and rebates for uses under 40 cubic meters; Special fund for development and payment for the electrical and water bills of places of worship
6	The welfare of youth, women and society	6,000 units of youth transit homes in Rawang; Shah Alam Stadium as the home stadium of Selangor FA; State government Pusat Ngaji (place to learn to read Quran) in every state constituencies; 50 percent reduction of door tax in agricultural land and empty house lots
7	Efficient and affordable public transport	Integrated transport hub in Shah Alam; Create land port hub; Special school bus fares fund to B40 families; Special fund to obtain motorcycle license; Motorcycle racing circuit in every state constituencies; Improvement of free bus service to the citizen; RM1,000 aid scheme to obtain heavy vehicle licenses
8	Public's security and safety	Increase CCTV in high risk area; Special fund for villages' and traditional villages' security; Adding street light facilities; Monitoring and enforcing laws to foreign workers; Special fund to create security post in residential areas
9	Quality health and sustainable environment	Ambulances in every state constituencies; Free dialysis center in every state constituencies; Special fund to fight dengue; 20 cent payments to people who brought their own plastic bags to stores that charges plastic bags; Counseling center in every state constituencies
10	The well-being and life quality of the rural communities	Special fund to low-cost housing maintenance by Joint Management Body (JMB); Abolish outstanding summonses / compounds to hawker / small trader and traffic offenses; Nursery and kindergarten facilities in every low / medium cost residential area; Increasing the amount of Kedai Rakyat 1Malaysia 2.0

=== Gagasan Sejahtera ===
Gagasan Sejahtera launches their manifestos on 29 March 2018. They use the theme Selangor Sejahtera (English: Prosperous Selangor) in their manifestos. It consist of 10 cores focusing on forming a government and administration that follows the principles of divinity, accountability and competent in making a peaceful environment for the multiracial and multi-religion state.

#	Cores	
1	Prosperous government	Sharing of the economic prosperity with the people by continuing and improving the welfare programs by the current state government; Adheres to the principle of fairness, integrity, virtue, competence and transparency based on the preservation of religion, life, wealth, intellect and heredity; Leaders who are caring, competent and free of corruption; Mature and prosperous political culture
2	Religious and cultural welfare	Appreciation of the national culture policy which places Islam as the foundation of racial unity and harmony; Incentives to management officials of places of worship, Muslim and non-Muslim
3	Income welfare	Basic food aids to target groups on a monthly basis; Expansion of the digital economy through the provision of hubs and infrastructures
4	Education welfare	Parents-Teachers Association incentives on a yearly basis; Free education for state government owned schools; Post graduation (SPM) academy; Creating a scheme for state government teachers and school staffs; Assistance in paying the school bus fares
5	Prosperity of young people	Youth Training Academy to polish skills in futuristic industry; Establishing a business entrepreneurial plaza; Incentives to volunteer and youth welfare clubs; Youth fitness and recreation program incentives; Developing a complete sports infrastructure
6	Prosperity of women and families	RM150 incentives to women's health and elegance; RM500 incentives to women who gave birth; Assistance and guidance service to harmony marriage and household well-being; Assistance to single mothers
7	Health wellbeing	Takaful protection scheme (insurance) for Selangorians; Promoting a healthy lifestyle; RM200 incentive for people older than 40 who goes for health screening; Transportation service to disabled and elderly to hospitals
8	Farm economy prosperity	Productivity-based incentives to farmers, breeders and fishermen; Providing initial capital grants RM10 million to 500 young farmers; Digital marketing network of agro-products, livestock and fisheries
9	Residential welfare	Create rent to own Prosperous Selangor Home; Neighborhood community support program
10	Environmental prosperity	Incentives of new energy sources and green technology; Natural river conservation

=== Parti Rakyat Malaysia ===
Parti Rakyat Malaysia publishes their manifesto on their blog on 30 April 2018.

Manifesto

1. Peace and harmony
2. Reduce reliance on foreign workers
3. Reinstate local government election involving the participation of local candidates
4. Economic opportunities
5. Environment
6. Affordable Housing
7. Participation in Improving Security and a Better Community
8. Improve Competitiveness Among Young People
9. Encouraging Youth Involvement in Agriculture and Agribusiness
10. Formulate Comprehensive Labour Policy To Ensure Private Sectors Employ Permanent Staff Instead Of Contract Staff

=== People's Alternative Party ===
People's Alternative Party only has two candidates competing in Selangor. One of the candidates, the Selangor branch chairman Harry Arul Krishnan, states that he will resolve the issue of birth certificate and identity cards for the stateless and launch crime intervention programs among other thing during his manifesto announcement on 3 May 2018 in Sungai Pelek.

=== Independent Candidates ===
Some of the independent candidates releases their own manifesto, specific for their contested seat.

==== Azman Mohd Noor ====
Azman contested at Rawang seat. His manifesto includes:

1. Support the economy, spiritual and the people's welfare development program
2. Continuing the organized and systematic care of infrastructures in Rawang
3. Upgrading the places of worship
4. Healthy lifestyle
5. Helps to restructure small businesses
6. Free tuition
7. Hygiene campaigns
8. Recycling campaigns
9. Upgrading the existing health centers

==== Azwan Ali ====
Azwan Ali, contested against his elder brother, former Menteri Besar of Selangor, Azmin Ali at Bukit Antarabangsa seat. He announces his manifesto on 27 April 2018, pledging to:

1. Meet the people every day to listen to their problems
2. Eliminate the corruption culture in politics immediately
3. Solve the water supply problems in Selangor
4. Provide affordable housing for the people
5. Give charity to the people

==== Toh Sin Wah ====
Toh Sin Wah contested at Subang Jaya seat. He didn't announce specific manifesto but regards his participation in the election as "to bring politics to the people", going against the exclusive and nepotistic politics concept brought by the two biggest parties, Barisan Nasional and Pakatan Harapan.

== Nomination ==
Candidates were nominated at numerous nomination centres around Selangor on 28 April. The candidates must deliver their nomination papers by 10 am to qualify to contest in the election.

=== Nomination centres ===
Constituency	Nomination centres
Sungai Air Tawar	Tun Razak Hall, Sabak Bernam
Sabak	Tun Razak Hall, Sabak Bernam
Sungai Panjang	Seri Bernam Hall, Sungai Besar
Sekinchan	Seri Bernam Hall, Sungai Besar
Hulu Bernam	Hulu Selangor District Sports Complex Multipurpose Hall
Kuala Kubu Baharu	Hulu Selangor District Sports Complex Multipurpose Hall
Batang Kali	Hulu Selangor District Sports Complex Multipurpose Hall
Sungai Burong	Dato' Hormat Hall Tanjong Karang
Permatang	Dato' Hormat Hall Tanjong Karang
Bukit Melawati	Kuala Selangor Sports Complex Indoor Stadium
Ijok	Kuala Selangor Sports Complex Indoor Stadium
Jeram	Kuala Selangor Sports Complex Indoor Stadium
Kuang	Selayang Municipal Council Office Lobby
Rawang	Selayang Municipal Council Office Lobby
Taman Templer	Selayang Municipal Council Office Lobby
Sungai Tua	SMK Sungai Pusu Hall, Gombak
Gombak Setia	SMK Sungai Pusu Hall, Gombak
Hulu Kelang	SMK Sungai Pusu Hall, Gombak
Bukit Antarabangsa	Dato' Ahmad Razali Hall
Lembah Jaya	Dato' Ahmad Razali Hall
Pandan Indah	Ampang Jaya Municipal Council Hall
Teratai	Ampang Jaya Municipal Council Hall
Dusun Tua	Kajang Municipal Council Seri Cempaka Hall
Semenyih	Kajang Municipal Council Seri Cempaka Hall
Kajang	Hulu Langat District/Land Office Demesne Main Hall
Sungai Ramal	Hulu Langat District/Land Office Demesne Main Hall
Balakong	Hulu Langat District/Land Office Demesne Main Hall
Seri Kembangan	Subang Jaya Municipal Council Hall, Puchong Indah
Seri Serdang	Subang Jaya Municipal Council Hall, Puchong Indah
Kinrara	3K Complex, SS13, Subang Jaya
Subang Jaya	3K Complex, SS13, Subang Jaya
Seri Setia	Petaling Jaya City Council Civic Hall
Taman Medan	Petaling Jaya City Council Civic Hall
Bukit Gasing	Petaling Jaya City Council Civic Hall
Kampung Tunku	Puay Chai Hall, SRJK(C) Jalan SS 2/54 Petaling Jaya
Bandar Utama	Puay Chai Hall, SRJK(C) Jalan SS 2/54 Petaling Jaya
Bukit Lanjan	Puay Chai Hall, SRJK(C) Jalan SS 2/54 Petaling Jaya
Paya Jaras	SMK Seksyen 8 Main Hall Kota Damansara
Kota Damansara	SMK Seksyen 8 Main Hall Kota Damansara
Kota Anggerik	Dewan Besar Tanjung MBSA, Seksyen 19, Shah Alam
Batu Tiga	Dewan Besar Tanjung MBSA, Seksyen 19, Shah Alam
Meru	Klang District/Land Office Multipurpose Hall
Sementa	Klang District/Land Office Multipurpose Hall
Selat Kelang	Klang District/Land Office Multipurpose Hall
Bandar Baru Klang	Pandamaran Sports Complex Hall, Klang
Pelabuhan Klang	Pandamaran Sports Complex Hall, Klang
Sentosa	Kemuning Utama Shah Alam City Council Hall, Seksyen 32, Shah Alam
Sungai Kandis	Kemuning Utama Shah Alam City Council Hall, Seksyen 32, Shah Alam
Kota Kemuning	Kemuning Utama Shah Alam City Council Hall, Seksyen 32, Shah Alam
Sijangkang	Dewan Seri Jugra, Telok Datuk, Banting
Banting	Dewan Seri Jugra, Telok Datuk, Banting
Morib	Dewan Seri Jugra, Telok Datuk, Banting
Tanjong Sepat	Bandar Baru Salak Tinggi Multipurpose Hall, Sepang
Dengkil	Bandar Baru Salak Tinggi Multipurpose Hall, Sepang
Sungai Pelek	Bandar Baru Salak Tinggi Multipurpose Hall, Sepang

=== The contested seats and candidates ===
No.	State constituency	Incumbent State Assemblyman	Political parties							
No.	State constituency	Incumbent State Assemblyman	Pakatan Harapan		Gagasan Sejahtera		Barisan Nasional		Other parties/Ind	
No.	State constituency	Incumbent State Assemblyman	Candidate Name	Party	Candidate Name	Party	Candidate Name	Party	Candidate Name	Party
N01	Sungai Air Tawar	Vacant	Mohd. Hamizar Sulaiman	Bersatu	Zamri Yahya	PAS	Rizam Ismail	UMNO	—N/a	—N/a
N02	Sabak	Sallehen Mukhyi (GS)	Ahmad Mustain Othman	Amanah	Sallehen Mukhyi	PAS	Sallehudin Mohd Iskan	UMNO	—N/a	—N/a
N03	Sungai Panjang	Budiman Mohd Zohdi (BN)	Mariam Abdul Rashid	Amanah	Mohd Razali Shaari	PAS	Imran Tamrin	UMNO	—N/a	—N/a
N04	Sekinchan	Ng Suee Lim (PH)	Ng Suee Lim	DAP	Mohd Fazlin Taslimin	PAS	Lee Yee Yuan	MCA	—N/a	—N/a
N05	Hulu Bernam	Rosni Sohar (BN)	Mohd. Amran Sakir	Amanah	Mohammed Salleh Ri	PAS	Rosni Sohar	UMNO	—N/a	—N/a
N06	Kuala Kubu Baharu	Lee Kee Hiong (PH)	Lee Kee Hiong	DAP	Naharudin Abd Rashid	PAS	Wong Koon Mun	MCA	—N/a	—N/a
N07	Batang Kali	Mat Nadzari Ahmad Dahlan (BN)	Harumaini Omar	Bersatu	Mohd Hasnizan Harun	PAS	Mat Nadzari Ahmad Dahlan	UMNO	—N/a	—N/a
N08	Sungai Burong	Mohd Shamsudin Lias (BN)	Mohd. Tarmizi Lazim	Bersatu	Mohd. Zamri Mohd. Zainuldin	PAS	Mohd. Shamsudin Lias	UMNO	—N/a	—N/a
N09	Permatang	Sulaiman Abdul Razak (BN)	Rozana Zainal Abidin	PKR	Muhammad Jafaruddin Sheik Daud	PAS	Sulaiman Abdul Razak	UMNO	—N/a	—N/a
N10	Bukit Melawati	Jakiran Jacomah (BN)	Juwairiya Zulkifli	PKR	Muhammad Rashid Muhammad Kassim	PAS	Jakiran Jacomah	UMNO	—N/a	—N/a
N11	Ijok	Idris Ahmad (PH)	Idris Ahmad	PKR	Jefri Mejan	Ikatan	K. Parthiban	MIC	Kumaran Tamil Dassen	PRM
N12	Jeram	Amiruddin Setro (BN)	Mohd. Shaid Rosli	Bersatu	Mohd Noor Mohd Shahar	PAS	Zahar Azlan Ariffin	UMNO	—N/a	—N/a
N13	Kuang	Abdul Shukur Idrus (BN)	Sallehudin Amiruddin	Bersatu	Mohd Fauzan Madzlan	PAS	Abdul Shukur Idrus	UMNO	Mohd Rafie Mohammad Arif	PRM
N14	Rawang	Gan Pei Nei (PH)	Chua Wei Kiat	PKR	Kong Tuck Wah	PAS	Chan Wun Hoong	MCA	Azman Mohd Noor	IND
N15	Taman Templer	Zaidy Abdul Talib (GS)	Mohd Sany Hamzan	Amanah	Zaidy Abdul Talib	PAS	Md Nasir Ibrahim	UMNO	Koh Swe Yong	PRM
N15	Taman Templer	Zaidy Abdul Talib (GS)	Mohd Sany Hamzan	Amanah	Zaidy Abdul Talib	PAS	Md Nasir Ibrahim	UMNO	Rajandran Batumalai	PAP
N16	Sungai Tua (previously known as Batu Caves)	Amirudin Shari (PH)	Amirudin Shari	PKR	Mohammad Ibrahim	PAS	N. Rawisandran	MIC	Badrul Hisam Md Zin	IND
N17	Gombak Setia	Hasbullah Mohd Ridzwan (GS)	Hilman Idham	PKR	Hasbullah Mohd Ridzwan	PAS	Megat Zulkarnain Omardin	UMNO	—N/a	—N/a
N18	Hulu Kelang	Saari Sungib (PH)	Saari Sungib	Amanah	Kamalulhysham Mohd Suhut	PAS	Ismail Ahmad	UMNO	—N/a	—N/a
N19	Bukit Antarabangsa	Mohamed Azmin Ali (PH)	Mohamed Azmin Ali	PKR	Syarifah Haslizah Syed Ariffin	PAS	Salwa Yunus	UMNO	Ahmad Kamarudin	PRM
N19	Bukit Antarabangsa	Mohamed Azmin Ali (PH)	Mohamed Azmin Ali	PKR	Syarifah Haslizah Syed Ariffin	PAS	Salwa Yunus	UMNO	Azwan Ali	IND
N20	Lembah Jaya	Khasim Abdul Aziz (GS)	Haniza Mohamed Talha	PKR	Khasim Abdul Aziz	PAS	Muhamad Nizam Shith	UMNO	Norizwan Mohamed	PRM
N21	Pandan Indah (previously known as Chempaka)	Iskandar Abdul Samad (GS)	Izham Hashim	Amanah	Iskandar Abdul Samad	PAS	Mohd Haniff Koslan	UMNO	—N/a	—N/a
N22	Teratai	Tiew Way Keng (PH)	Lai Wai Chong	DAP	Mohd Irman Abdul Wahab	PAS	Liew Pok Boon	Gerakan	Jenice Lee Ying Ha	PRM
N23	Dusun Tua	Razaly Hassan (GS)	Edry Faizal Eddy Yusof	DAP	Razaly Hassan	PAS	Mohd Zin Isa	UMNO	—N/a	—N/a
N24	Semenyih	Johan Abd Aziz (BN)	Bakhtiar Mohd Nor	Bersatu	Mad Shahmidur Mat Kosim	PAS	Johan Abd Aziz	UMNO	Arutchelvan Subramaniams	PSM
N25	Kajang	Wan Azizah Wan Ismail (PH)	Hee Loy Sian	PKR	Zaiton Ahmad	PAS	Teh Yeow Meng	MCA	Dennis Wan Jinn Woei	PRM
N26	Sungai Ramal (previously known as Bangi)	Mohd Shafie Ngah (GS)	Mazwan Johar	Amanah	Nushi Mahfodz	PAS	Abdul Rahim Mohd Amin	UMNO	—N/a	—N/a
N27	Balakong	Eddie Ng Tien Chee (PH)	Eddie Ng Tien Chee	DAP	Mohamad Ibrahim Ghazali	PAS	Lim Chin Wah	MCA	—N/a	—N/a
N28	Seri Kembangan	Ean Yong Hian Wah (PH)	Ean Yong Hian Wah	DAP	—N/a	—N/a	Chang Toong Woh	MCA	—N/a	—N/a
N29	Seri Serdang	Noor Hanim Ismail (GS)	Siti Mariah Mahmud	Amanah	Noor Hanim Ismail	PAS	Mohammad Satim Diman	UMNO	—N/a	—N/a
N30	Kinrara	Ng Sze Han (PH)	Ng Sze Han	DAP	Lim Ying Ran	Ikatan	Chiew Kai Heng	MCA	—N/a	—N/a
N31	Subang Jaya	Hannah Yeoh Tseow Suan (PH)	Michelle Ng Mei Sze	DAP	—N/a	—N/a	Chong Ah Watt	MCA	Toh Sin Wah	IND
N32	Seri Setia	Nik Nazmi Nik Ahmad (PH)	Shaharuddin Badarudin	PKR	Mohd Ghazali Daud	PAS	Yusoff M. Haniff	UMNO	Vigneswaran Subramaniam	IND
N33	Taman Medan	Haniza Mohamed Talha (PH)	Syamsul Firdaus Mohamed Supri	PKR	Ariffin Mahaiyuddin	PAS	Abdul Mutalif Abd Rahim	UMNO	—N/a	—N/a
N34	Bukit Gasing	Rajiv Rishyakaran (PH)	Rajiv Rishyakaran	DAP	David Sew Kah Heng	Ikatan	Chai Ko Thing	Gerakan	—N/a	—N/a
N35	Kampung Tunku	Lau Weng San (PH)	Lim Yi Wei	DAP	—N/a	—N/a	Tam Gim Tuan	MCA	—N/a	—N/a
N36	Bandar Utama (previously known as Damansara Utama)	Yeo Bee Yin (PH)	Jamaliah Jamaluddin	DAP	—N/a	—N/a	Ch'ng Soo Chau	MCA	Chong Fook Meng	IND
N37	Bukit Lanjan	Elizabeth Wong Keat Ping (PH)	Elizabeth Wong Keat Ping	PKR	—N/a	—N/a	Syed Abdul Razak Syed Long Alsagof	Gerakan	—N/a	—N/a
N38	Paya Jaras	Mohd Khairuddin Othman (GS)	Mohd Khairuddin Othman	PKR	Hanafi Zulkapli	PAS	Zein Isma Ismail	UMNO	—N/a	—N/a
N39	Kota Damansara	Halimaton Saadiah Bohan (BN)	Shatiri Mansor	PKR	Siti Rohaya Ahad	PAS	Halimaton Saadiah Bohan	UMNO	Sivarajan Arumugam	PSM
N40	Kota Anggerik	Yaakob Sapari (PH)	Najwan Halimi	PKR	Ahmad Dusuki Abd Rani	PAS	Jumaeah Masdi	UMNO	—N/a	—N/a
N41	Batu Tiga	Rodziah Ismail (PH)	Rodziah Ismail	PKR	Abdul Halim Omar	PAS	Ahmad Mua'adzam Shah Ya'akop	UMNO	—N/a	—N/a
N42	Meru	Abd Rani Osman (GS)	Mohd. Fakhrulrazi Mohd Mokhtar	Amanah	Noor Najhan Mohd Salleh	PAS	Khairul Anuar Saimun	UMNO	Shee Chee Weng	IND
N42	Meru	Abd Rani Osman (GS)	Mohd. Fakhrulrazi Mohd Mokhtar	Amanah	Noor Najhan Mohd Salleh	PAS	Khairul Anuar Saimun	UMNO	Manikavasagam Sundaram	PRM
N43	Sementa	Daroyah Alwi (PH)	Daroyah Alwi	PKR	Wan Hasrina Wan Hassan	PAS	Saroni Judi	UMNO	Gandhi Nagamuthu	PRM
N44	Selat Klang	Halimah Ali (GS)	Abdul Rashid Asari	Bersatu	Halimah Ali	PAS	Mohd Khairi Hussin	UMNO	Jeichandran Wadivelu	PRM
N44	Selat Klang	Halimah Ali (GS)	Abdul Rashid Asari	Bersatu	Halimah Ali	PAS	Mohd Khairi Hussin	UMNO	Zainal Azwar Kamaruddin	IND
N45	Bandar Baru Klang (previously known as Sungai Pinang)	Teng Chang Khim (PH)	Teng Chang Khim	DAP	—N/a	—N/a	Teoh Kah Yeong	MCA	—N/a	—N/a
N46	Pelabuhan Klang	Abdul Khalid Ibrahim (IND)	Azmizam Zaman Huri	PKR	Khalid Nayan	PAS	Seikh Rajesh Seikh Ahmad	UMNO	Shanmugasundram Veerappan	PSM
N47	Pandamaran	Eric Tan Pok Shyong (PH)	Leong Tuck Chee	DAP	G.S. Santokh Singh	Ikatan	Tee Hooi Ling	MCA	—N/a	—N/a
N48	Sentosa (previously known as Kota Alam Shah)	Ganabatirau Veraman (PH)	Gunarajah George	PKR	Rajan Manikesavan	PAS	R. Subramaniam	MIC	Sundarajoo A.Periasamy	IND
N48	Sentosa (previously known as Kota Alam Shah)	Ganabatirau Veraman (PH)	Gunarajah George	PKR	Rajan Manikesavan	PAS	R. Subramaniam	MIC	M. Telai Amblam	PRM
N49	Sungai Kandis (previously known as Seri Andalas)	Xavier Jayakumar Arulanandam (PH)	Mat Shuhaimi Shafiei	PKR	Mohd Yusof Abdullah	PAS	Kamaruzzaman Johari	UMNO	Hanafiah Husin	PRM
N50	Kota Kemuning (previously known as Sri Muda)	Mat Shuhaimi Shafiei (PH)	Ganabatirau Veraman	DAP	Burhan Adnan	PAS	Tiew Hock Huat	Gerakan	Abdul Razak Ismail	PSM
N50	Kota Kemuning (previously known as Sri Muda)	Mat Shuhaimi Shafiei (PH)	Ganabatirau Veraman	DAP	Burhan Adnan	PAS	Tiew Hock Huat	Gerakan	Rajasekaran Soundaparandy	IND
N51	Sijangkang	Ahmad Yunus Hairi (GS)	Mohd Hamidi Abu Bakar	Bersatu	Ahmad Yunus Hairi	PAS	Sulaiman Mohd Karli	UMNO	—N/a	—N/a
N52	Banting (previously known as Teluk Datuk)	Loh Chee Heng (IND)	Lau Weng San	DAP	—N/a	—N/a	Ng Siok Hwa	MCA	Tan Choon Swee	PRM
N53	Morib	Hasnul Baharuddin (PH)	Hasnul Baharuddin	Amanah	Mohammad Sallehuddin Hafiz	PAS	Rozana Kamarulzaman	UMNO	—N/a	—N/a
N54	Tanjong Sepat	Mohd Haslin Hassan (GS)	Borhan Aman Shah	PKR	Mohd Haslin Hassan	PAS	Karim Mansor	UMNO	—N/a	—N/a
N55	Dengkil	Shahrum Mohd Sharif (BN)	Adhif Syan Abdullah	Bersatu	Yusmi Haniff Ariffin	PAS	Shahrum Mohd Sharif	UMNO	—N/a	—N/a
N56	Sungai Pelek	Lai Nyuk Lan (PH)	Ronnie Liu	DAP	Rohaya Mohd Shahir	PAS	Ng Chok Sin	MCA	Harry Arul Raj Krishnan	PAP

== Campaign ==
In April 2018, the Selangor Islamic Council (MAIS) and Selangor Islamic Department (JAIS) released circulars following the decree by Sharafuddin of Selangor, to remind the public about the prohibition of using mosques as campaigning sites for the election.

The electoral campaign in the northernmost parliament seat Sabak Bernam, which included the assembly seat Sungai Air Tawar and Sabak targeted on issues faced by the locals, who are mostly farmers and fishermen. In Sungai Air Tawar, BN candidate Rizam Ismail planned to build up the town and helping small scale entrepreneurs by upgrading broken stalls and give them exposure to online business. Sallehen Mukhyi, the Sabak incumbent assemblyman and GS candidate, proposed for Sabak to be an agropolitan town to help farmers marketing their produce. Another candidate, Sallehuddin Iskan from BN used the slogan Berilmu, Berbakti, Berintegriti (in English: Knowledgeable, devoted and has strong moral principle) in his campaign, and pledge to help the local in issues regarding affordable housing and small scale palm oil farmers. Meanwhile, Ahmad Mustain of PH campaigned for Sabak to have modern agriculture practices that gives higher yields, higher wages and to reduce urban migration.

Jamal Yunos, the Sungai Besar UMNO division chief, organised a consert and offered a cash prize amounted to RM25,000 to a lucky draw winner in return for votes for Barisan Nasional candidates. He also launched a campaign to stick BN stickers to vehicles in exchange of RM10 each. Sekinchan DAP lodges a police report on the incident, claiming it went against the election rules. Sekinchan voters, when interviewed expressed different voting preferences, some voted based on the candidates and some voted based on which party the candidates endorsed.

Selangor branch of the Royal Malaysia Police stated that 114 reports were lodged throughout the ten days of campaigning duration.

== Election pendulum ==
The 14th General Election witnessed 51 governmental seats and 5 non-governmental seats filled the Selangor State Legislative Assembly. The government side has 21 safe seats and 8 fairly safe seats. However, none of the non-government side has safe and fairly safe seat.

2018 Selangor state election

GOVERNMENT SEATS
Marginal
Sabak	Ahmad Mustain Othman	AMANAH	34.88
Selat Klang	Abdul Rashid Asari	BERSATU	35.99
Morib	Hasnul Baharuddin	AMANAH	40.42
Jeram	Mohd. Shaid Rosli	BERSATU	40.94
Pelabuhan Klang	Azmizam Zaman Huri	PKR	42.13
Kuang	Sallehuddin Amiruddin	BERSATU	43.67
Ijok	Dr. Idris Ahmad	PKR	45.18
Permatang	Rozana Zainal Abidin	PKR	46.03
Tanjong Sepat	Borhan Aman Shah	PKR	46.30
Sementa	Dr. Daroyah Alwi	PKR	46.80
Dengkil	Adhif Syan Abdullah	BERSATU	48.30
Bukit Melawati	Juwairiya Zulkifli	PKR	48.75
Taman Templer	Mohd. Sany Hamzan	AMANAH	50.18
Semenyih	Bakhtiar Mohd. Nor	BERSATU	50.76
Batang Kali	Harumaini Omar	BERSATU	51.08
Sungai Ramal	Mazwan Johar	AMANAH	51.31
Gombak Setia	Hilman Idham	PKR	51.37
Sekinchan	Ng Suee Lim	DAP	51.62
Meru	Mohd. Fakhrulrazi Mohd. Mokhtar	AMANAH	52.04
Sungai Pelek	Ronnie Liu Tian Khiew	DAP	52.55
Dusun Tua	Edry Faizal Eddy Yusof	DAP	53.16
Sungai Kandis	Mat Shuhaimi Shafiei	PKR	55.60
Fairly safe
Taman Medan	Syamsul Firdaus Mohamed Supri	PKR	57.78
Kuala Kubu Baharu	Lee Kee Hiong	DAP	57.85
Batu Tiga	Rodziah Ismail	PKR	58.24
Paya Jaras	Mohd. Khairuddin Othman	PKR	58.68
Kota Anggerik	Najwan Halimi	PKR	58.82
Hulu Kelang	Saari Sungib	AMANAH	58.89
Lembah Jaya	Haniza Mohamed Talha	PKR	59.60
Seri Serdang	Dr. Siti Mariah Mahmud	AMANAH	59.71
Safe
Pandan Indah	Ir. Izham Hashim	AMANAH	60.83
Kota Damansara	Shatiri Mansor	PKR	61.14
Sungai Tua	Amirudin Shari	PKR	61.61
Seri Setia	Prof. Dr. Shaharuddin Badaruddin	PKR	66.62
Kota Kemuning	Ganabatirau Veraman	DAP	70.63
Kajang	Hee Loy Sian	DAP	71.59
Rawang	Chua Wei Kiat	PKR	76.91
Teratai	Lai Wai Chong	DAP	76.91
Balakong	Eddie Ng Tien Chee	DAP	77.53
Bukit Antarabangsa	Mohamed Azmin Ali	PKR	79.64
Banting	Lau Weng San	DAP	81.81
Kinrara	Ng Sze Han	DAP	82.96
Pandamaran	Leong Tuck Chee	DAP	85.32
Sentosa	Gunarajah George	PKR	85.62
Bukit Lanjan	Elizabeth Wong Keat Ping	DAP	86.40
Bukit Gasing	Rajiv Rishyakaran	DAP	86.92
Subang Jaya	Michelle Ng Mei Sze	DAP	88.33
Kampung Tunku	Lim Yi Wei	DAP	89.53
Bandar Baru Klang	Teng Chang Khim	DAP	89.81
Bandar Utama	Jamaliah Jamaluddin	DAP	90.47
Seri Kembangan	Ean Yong Hian Wah	DAP	90.79

NON-GOVERNMENT SEATS
Marginal
Sijangkang	Dr. Ahmad Yunus Hairi	PAS	37.19
Sungai Panjang	Mohd. Imran Tamrin	UMNO	40.54
Sungai Air Tawar	Rizam Ismail	UMNO	40.71
Sungai Burong	Mohd. Shamsudin Lias	UMNO	42.69
Hulu Bernam	Rosni Sohar	UMNO	43.28

== Results ==
After all 56 constituencies had been declared, the results were:

An animated electoral map of Selangor, depicting the state constituencies gained by the Pakatan Harapan (PH) in the 2018 Election. PH-controlled seats BN-controlled seats GS-controlled seats PKR-controlled seats DAP-controlled seats Independent seats

The result of the election was announced after 5pm on 9 May 2018. Pakatan Harapan won 51 out of 56 seats and was entitled to form a government in Selangor.

The Pakatan Harapan (PH) coalition won its best ever electoral results in Selangor and retained their control of the state. In the previous election, its predecessor informal coalition Pakatan Rakyat only managed to snatch 29 seats to form a simple majority. This time around, they manage to secure 51 out of 56 seats and 63.37% of popular votes, of which PH state leader Azmin Ali had described as 'exceptional result, exceed my own expectations of 40 seats.' People's Justice Party (PKR) and Democratic Action Party (DAP), two of the parties in the coalition won in every seats they were contesting at. The debut of new parties, Malaysian United Indigenous Party (BERSATU) and National Trust Party (AMANAH) had gone exceptionally well as they won 6 and 8 seats respectively, out of 9 and 10 seats they are competing.

The election also saw bad performance on Barisan Nasional (BN) coalition side. Not only the component parties Malaysian Indian Congress (MIC), Malaysian Chinese Association (MCA) and Malaysian People's Movement Party were unable to snatch any seat in the election but United Malays National Organisation (UMNO) only managed to retained four out of their eight seats won in the previous election. Gagasan Sejahtera lost most seat to PH in the election and was only able to retained one seat, Sijangkang.

The incumbent Menteri Besar of Selangor, Azmin Ali had defended his Bukit Antarabangsa seat with over 79% popular vote and overwhelming 25,512 majority votes. While GS Selangor leader, Sallehen Mukhyi loses his seat in Sabak to AMANAH's Ahmad Mustain Othman with slim margin of 130 votes.

Party or alliance		Votes	%	Seats	+/–
Pakatan Harapan	Democratic Action Party	515,649	25.08	16	+1
Pakatan Harapan	People's Justice Party	498,927	24.26	21	+7
Pakatan Harapan	National Trust Party	172,937	8.41	8	+8
Pakatan Harapan	Malaysian United Indigenous Party	115,589	5.62	6	+6
Pakatan Harapan	Total	1,303,102	63.37	51	22
Barisan Nasional	United Malays National Organisation	334,152	16.25	4	–8
Barisan Nasional	Malaysian Chinese Association	78,781	3.83	0	0
Barisan Nasional	Parti Gerakan Rakyat Malaysia	20,431	0.99	0	0
Barisan Nasional	Malaysian Indian Congress	17,378	0.85	0	0
Barisan Nasional	Total	450,742	21.92	4	–8
Gagasan Sejahtera	Malaysian Islamic Party	286,227	13.92	1	–14
Gagasan Sejahtera	Malaysia National Alliance Party	10,023	0.49	0	0
Gagasan Sejahtera	Total	296,250	14.41	1	–14
Parti Rakyat Malaysia		2,111	0.10	0	0
Socialist Party of Malaysia		2,082	0.10	0	0
People's Alternative Party		187	0.01	0	0
Independents		1,944	0.09	0	0
Total		2,056,418	100.00	56	0
Valid votes		2,056,418	99.11		
Invalid/blank votes		18,473	0.89		
Total votes		2,074,891	100.00		
Registered voters/turnout		2,415,074	85.91		
Source: SPR

=== By constituency ===
#	Constituency	Winner	Votes	Majority	Opponent(s)	Votes	Incumbent	Incumbent Majority
BN 4 | PH 51 | PAS 1 | Independent 0
N1	Sungai Air Tawar	Rizam Ismail (BN-UMNO)	5,437	1,440	Mohd. Hamizar Sulaiman (PH-PPBM)	3,921	Kamarol Zaki Haji Abdul Malik (BN-UMNO)	1,416
N1	Sungai Air Tawar	Rizam Ismail (BN-UMNO)	5,437	1,440	Zamri Yahya (GS-PAS)	3,997	Kamarol Zaki Haji Abdul Malik (BN-UMNO)	1,416
N2	Sabak	Ahmad Mustain Othman (PH-AMANAH)	6,981	130	Sallehen Mukhyi (GS-PAS)	6,183	Sallehen Mukhyi (PAS)	399
N2	Sabak	Ahmad Mustain Othman (PH-AMANAH)	6,981	130	Sallehudin Mohd Iskan (BN-UMNO)	6,851	Sallehen Mukhyi (PAS)	399
N3	Sungai Panjang	Imran Tamrin (BN-UMNO)	10,530	2,084	Mariam Abdul Rashid (PH-AMANAH)	8,446	Budiman Mohd Zohdi (BN-UMNO)	2,183
N3	Sungai Panjang	Imran Tamrin (BN-UMNO)	10,530	2,084	Mohd Razali Shaari (GS-PAS)	6,999	Budiman Mohd Zohdi (BN-UMNO)	2,183
N4	Sekinchan	Ng Suee Lim (PH-DAP)	7,863	2,844	Mohd Fazlin Taslimin (GS-PAS)	2,351	Ng Suee Lim (PH-DAP)	2,239
N4	Sekinchan	Ng Suee Lim (PH-DAP)	7,863	2,844	Lee Yee Yuan (BN-MCA)	5,019	Ng Suee Lim (PH-DAP)	2,239
N5	Hulu Bernam	Rosni Sohar (BN-UMNO)	8,164	20	Mohd. Amran Sakir (PH-AMANAH)	8,144	Rosni Sohar (BN-UMNO)	3,032
N5	Hulu Bernam	Rosni Sohar (BN-UMNO)	8,164	20	Mohammed Salleh Ri (GS-PAS)	2,554	Rosni Sohar (BN-UMNO)	3,032
N6	Kuala Kubu Baharu	Lee Kee Hiong (PH-DAP)	14,101	7,134	Naharudin Abd Rashid (GS-PAS)	3,306	Lee Kee Hiong (PH-DAP)	1,702
N6	Kuala Kubu Baharu	Lee Kee Hiong (PH-DAP)	14,101	7,134	Wong Koon Mun (BN-MCA)	6,967	Lee Kee Hiong (PH-DAP)	1,702
N7	Batang Kali	Harumaini Omar (PH-PPBM)	21,536	8,315	Mat Nadzari Ahmad Dahlan (BN-UMNO)	13,221	Mat Nadzari Ahmad Dahlan (BN-UMNO)	5,398
N7	Batang Kali	Harumaini Omar (PH-PPBM)	21,536	8,315	Mohd Hasnizan Harun (GS-PAS)	7,408	Mat Nadzari Ahmad Dahlan (BN-UMNO)	5,398
N8	Sungai Burong	Mohd Shamsudin Lian (BN-UMNO)	8,741	2,330	Mohd. Tarmizi Lazim (PH-PPBM)	5,323	Mohd Shamsudin Lian (BN-UMNO)	3,013
N8	Sungai Burong	Mohd Shamsudin Lian (BN-UMNO)	8,741	2,330	Mohd. Zamri Mohd. Zainuldin (GS-PAS)	6,411	Mohd Shamsudin Lian (BN-UMNO)	3,013
N9	Permatang	Rozana Zainal Abidin (PH-PKR)	9,208	1,158	Sulaiman Abdul Razak (BN-UMNO)	8,050	Sulaiman Abdul Razak (BN-UMNO)	1,026
N9	Permatang	Rozana Zainal Abidin (PH-PKR)	9,208	1,158	Muhammad Jafaruddin Sheik Daud (GS-PAS)	2,746	Sulaiman Abdul Razak (BN-UMNO)	1,026
N10	Bukit Melawati	Juwairiya Zulkifli (PH-PKR)	11,050	2,695	Jakiran Jacomah (BN-UMNO)	8,355	Jakiran Jacomah (BN-UMNO)	806
N10	Bukit Melawati	Juwairiya Zulkifli (PH-PKR)	11,050	2,695	Muhammad Rashid Muhammad Kassim (GS-PAS)	3,261	Jakiran Jacomah (BN-UMNO)	806
N11	Ijok	Idris Ahmad (PH-PKR)	8,914	2,114	Jefri Mejan (GS-IKATAN)	3,942	Idris Ahmad (PH-PKR)	739
N11	Ijok	Idris Ahmad (PH-PKR)	8,914	2,114	K. Parthiban (BN-MIC)	6,800	Idris Ahmad (PH-PKR)	739
N11	Ijok	Idris Ahmad (PH-PKR)	8,914	2,114	Kumaran Tamil Dassen (PRM)	76	Idris Ahmad (PH-PKR)	739
N12	Jeram	Mohd. Shaid Rosli (PH-PPBM)	7,087	1,191	Zahar Azlan Ariffin (BN-UMNO)	5,896	Amiruddin Setro (BN-UMNO)	2,834
N12	Jeram	Mohd. Shaid Rosli (PH-PPBM)	7,087	1,191	Mohd Noor Mohd Shahar (GS-PAS)	4,326	Amiruddin Setro (BN-UMNO)	2,834
N13	Kuang	Sallehudin Amiruddin (PH-PPBM)	9,845	2,860	Abdul Shukur Idrus (BN-UMNO)	6,985	Abdul Shukur Idrus (BN-UMNO)	1,255
N13	Kuang	Sallehudin Amiruddin (PH-PPBM)	9,845	2,860	Mohd Fauzan Madzlan (GS-PAS)	5,672	Abdul Shukur Idrus (BN-UMNO)	1,255
N13	Kuang	Sallehudin Amiruddin (PH-PPBM)	9,845	2,860	Mohd Rafie Mohammad Arif (PRM)	44	Abdul Shukur Idrus (BN-UMNO)	1,255
N14	Rawang	Chua Wei Kiat (PH-PKR)	29,946	23,860	Kong Tuck Wah (GS-PAS)	2,259	Gan Pei Nei (PH-PKR)	9,241
N14	Rawang	Chua Wei Kiat (PH-PKR)	29,946	23,860	Chan Wun Hoong (BN-MCA)	6,086	Gan Pei Nei (PH-PKR)	9,241
N14	Rawang	Chua Wei Kiat (PH-PKR)	29,946	23,860	Azman Mohd Noor (IND)	644	Gan Pei Nei (PH-PKR)	9,241
N15	Taman Templer	Mohd Sany Hamzan (PH-AMANAH)	18,362	7,903	Zaidy Abdul Talib (GS-PAS)	10,459	Zaidy Abdul Talib (PAS)	7,467
N15	Taman Templer	Mohd Sany Hamzan (PH-AMANAH)	18,362	7,903	Md Nasir Ibrahim (BN-UMNO)	7,580	Zaidy Abdul Talib (PAS)	7,467
N15	Taman Templer	Mohd Sany Hamzan (PH-AMANAH)	18,362	7,903	Koh Swe Yong (PRM)	82	Zaidy Abdul Talib (PAS)	7,467
N15	Taman Templer	Mohd Sany Hamzan (PH-AMANAH)	18,362	7,903	Rajandran Batumalai (PAP)	108	Zaidy Abdul Talib (PAS)	7,467
N16	Sungai Tua (previously known as Batu Caves)	Amirudin Shari (PH-PKR)	17,446	11,374	Mohammad Ibrahim (GS-PAS)	4,530	Amirudin Shari (PH-PKR)	3,261
N16	Sungai Tua (previously known as Batu Caves)	Amirudin Shari (PH-PKR)	17,446	11,374	N. Rawisandran (BN-MIC)	6,072	Amirudin Shari (PH-PKR)	3,261
N16	Sungai Tua (previously known as Batu Caves)	Amirudin Shari (PH-PKR)	17,446	11,374	Badrul Hisam Md Zin (IND)	268	Amirudin Shari (PH-PKR)	3,261
N17	Gombak Setia	Hilman Idham (PH-PKR)	24,157	12,399	Hasbullah Mohd Ridzwan (GS-PAS)	11,758	Hasbullah Mohd Ridzwan (PAS)	1,681
N17	Gombak Setia	Hilman Idham (PH-PKR)	24,157	12,399	Megat Zulkarnain Omardin (BN-UMNO)	11,113	Hasbullah Mohd Ridzwan (PAS)	1,681
N18	Hulu Kelang	Saari Sungib (PH-AMANAH)	25,746	15,349	Kamalulhysham Mohd Suhut (GS-PAS)	7,573	Saari Sungib (PH-AMANAH)	2,881
N18	Hulu Kelang	Saari Sungib (PH-AMANAH)	25,746	15,349	Ismail Ahmad (BN-UMNO)	10,397	Saari Sungib (PH-AMANAH)	2,881
N19	Bukit Antarabangsa	Mohamed Azmin Ali (PH-PKR)	30,892	25,512	Syarifah Haslizah Syed Ariffin (GS-PAS)	2,311	Mohamed Azmin Ali (PH-PKR)	4,044
N19	Bukit Antarabangsa	Mohamed Azmin Ali (PH-PKR)	30,892	25,512	Salwa Yunus (BN-UMNO)	5,380	Mohamed Azmin Ali (PH-PKR)	4,044
N19	Bukit Antarabangsa	Mohamed Azmin Ali (PH-PKR)	30,892	25,512	Ahmad Kamarudin (PRM)	116	Mohamed Azmin Ali (PH-PKR)	4,044
N19	Bukit Antarabangsa	Mohamed Azmin Ali (PH-PKR)	30,892	25,512	Azwan Ali (IND)	90	Mohamed Azmin Ali (PH-PKR)	4,044
N20	Lembah Jaya	Haniza Mohamed Talha (PH-PKR)	22,512	14,790	Khasim Abdul Aziz (GS-PAS)	7,358	Khasim Abdul Aziz (PAS)	8,713
N20	Lembah Jaya	Haniza Mohamed Talha (PH-PKR)	22,512	14,790	Muhamad Nizam Shith (BN-UMNO)	7,722	Khasim Abdul Aziz (PAS)	8,713
N20	Lembah Jaya	Haniza Mohamed Talha (PH-PKR)	22,512	14,790	Norizwan Mohamed (PRM)	177	Khasim Abdul Aziz (PAS)	8,713
N21	Pandan Indah (previously known as Chempaka)	Izham Hashim (PH-AMANAH)	24,914	16,386	Iskandar Abdul Samad (GS-PAS)	7,517	Iskandar Abdul Samad (PAS)	9,608
N21	Pandan Indah (previously known as Chempaka)	Izham Hashim (PH-AMANAH)	24,914	16,386	Mohd Haniff Koslan (BN-UMNO)	8,528	Iskandar Abdul Samad (PAS)	9,608
N22	Teratai	Lai Wai Chong (PH-DAP)	34,453	29,425	Mohd Irman Abdul Wahab (GS-PAS)	5,028	Tiew Way Keng (PH-DAP)	13,646
N22	Teratai	Lai Wai Chong (PH-DAP)	34,453	29,425	Liew Pok Boon (BN-GERAKAN)	4,784	Tiew Way Keng (PH-DAP)	13,646
N22	Teratai	Lai Wai Chong (PH-DAP)	34,453	29,425	Jenice Lee Ying Ha (PRM)	529	Tiew Way Keng (PH-DAP)	13,646
N23	Dusun Tua	Edry Faizal Eddy Yusof (PH-DAP)	22,325	10,422	Razaly Hassan (GS-PAS)	7,771	Razaly Hassan (PAS)	4,071
N23	Dusun Tua	Edry Faizal Eddy Yusof (PH-DAP)	22,325	10,422	Mohd Zin Isa (BN-UMNO)	11,903	Razaly Hassan (PAS)	4,071
N24	Semenyih	Bakhtiar Mohd Nor (PH-PPBM)	23,428	8,964	Johan Abdul Aziz (BN-UMNO)	14,464	Johan Abdul Aziz (BN-UMNO)	4,757
N24	Semenyih	Bakhtiar Mohd Nor (PH-PPBM)	23,428	8,964	Mad Shahmidur Mat Kosim (GS-PAS)	6,966	Johan Abdul Aziz (BN-UMNO)	4,757
N24	Semenyih	Bakhtiar Mohd Nor (PH-PPBM)	23,428	8,964	Arutchelvan Subramaniams (PSM)	1,293	Johan Abdul Aziz (BN-UMNO)	4,757
N25	Kajang	Hee Loy Sian (PH-PKR)	39,055	30,755	Zaiton Ahmad (GS-PAS)	8,300	Wan Azizah Wan Ismail (PH-PKR)	6,824
N25	Kajang	Hee Loy Sian (PH-PKR)	39,055	30,755	Teh Yeow Meng (BN-MCA)	7,097	Wan Azizah Wan Ismail (PH-PKR)	6,824
N25	Kajang	Hee Loy Sian (PH-PKR)	39,055	30,755	Dennis Wan Jinn Woei (PRM)	103	Wan Azizah Wan Ismail (PH-PKR)	6,824
N26	Sungai Ramal (previously known as Bangi)	Mazwan Johar (PH-AMANAH)	24,591	10,630	Nushi Mahfodz (GS-PAS)	13,961	Mohd Shafie Ngah (PAS)	11,838
N26	Sungai Ramal (previously known as Bangi)	Mazwan Johar (PH-AMANAH)	24,591	10,630	Abdul Rahim Mohd Amin (BN-UMNO)	9,372	Mohd Shafie Ngah (PAS)	11,838
N27	Balakong	Ng Tien Chee (PH-DAP)	41,768	35,538	Mohamad Ibrahim Ghazali (GS-PAS)	6,230	Ng Tien Chee (PH-DAP)	13,542
N27	Balakong	Ng Tien Chee (PH-DAP)	41,768	35,538	Lim Chin Wah (BN-MCA)	5,874	Ng Tien Chee (PH-DAP)	13,542
N28	Seri Kembangan	Ean Yong Hian Wah (PH-DAP)	34,659	31,145	Chang Toong Woh (BN-MCA)	3,514	Ean Yong Hian Wah (PH-DAP)	22,078
N29	Seri Serdang	Siti Mariah Mahmud (PH-AMANAH)	27,088	14,363	Noor Hanim Ismail (GS-PAS)	5,552	Noor Hanim Ismail (PAS)	16,251
N29	Seri Serdang	Siti Mariah Mahmud (PH-AMANAH)	27,088	14,363	Mohammad Satim Diman (BN-UMNO)	12,725	Noor Hanim Ismail (PAS)	16,251
N30	Kinrara	Ng Sze Han (PH-DAP)	52,207	45,212	Lim Ying Ran (GS-IKATAN)	3,732	Ng Sze Han (PH-DAP)	14,604
N30	Kinrara	Ng Sze Han (PH-DAP)	52,207	45,212	Chiew Kai Heng (BN-MCA)	6,995	Ng Sze Han (PH-DAP)	14,604
N31	Subang Jaya	Michelle Ng Mei Sze (PH-DAP)	55,354	48,272	Chong Ah Watt (BN-MCA)	7,082	Hannah Yeoh Tseow Suan (PH-DAP)	28,069
N31	Subang Jaya	Michelle Ng Mei Sze (PH-DAP)	55,354	48,272	Toh Sin Wah (IND)	228	Hannah Yeoh Tseow Suan (PH-DAP)	28,069
N32	Seri Setia	Shaharuddin Badarudin (PH-PKR)	29,250	19,372	Mohd Ghazali Daud (GS-PAS)	4,563	Nik Nazmi Nik Ahmad (PH-PKR)	4,663
N32	Seri Setia	Shaharuddin Badarudin (PH-PKR)	29,250	19,372	Yusoff M. Haniff (BN-UMNO)	9,878	Nik Nazmi Nik Ahmad (PH-PKR)	4,663
N32	Seri Setia	Shaharuddin Badarudin (PH-PKR)	29,250	19,372	Vigneswaran Subramaniam (IND)	217	Nik Nazmi Nik Ahmad (PH-PKR)	4,663
N33	Taman Medan	Syamsul Firdaus Mohamed Supri (PH-PKR)	21,712	10,940	Ariffin Mahaiyuddin (GS-PAS)	5,090	Haniza Mohamed Talha (PH-PKR)	3,731
N33	Taman Medan	Syamsul Firdaus Mohamed Supri (PH-PKR)	21,712	10,940	Abdul Mutalif Abd Rahim (BN-UMNO)	10,772	Haniza Mohamed Talha (PH-PKR)	3,731
N34	Bukit Gasing	Rajiv Rishyakaran (PH-DAP)	29,366	25,835	David Sew Kah Heng (GS-IKATAN)	890	Rajiv Rishyakaran (PH-DAP)	15,842
N34	Bukit Gasing	Rajiv Rishyakaran (PH-DAP)	29,366	25,835	Chai Ko Thing (BN-GERAKAN)	3,531	Rajiv Rishyakaran (PH-DAP)	15,842
N35	Kampung Tunku	Lim Yi Wei (PH-DAP)	34,477	30,444	Tam Gim Tuan (BN-MCA)	4,033	Lau Weng San (PH-DAP)	13,685
N36	Bandar Utama (previously known as Damansara Utama)	Jamaliah Jamaluddin (PH-DAP)	38,651	34,769	Ch'ng Soo Chau (BN-MCA)	3,882	Yeo Bee Yin (PH-DAP)	30,689
N36	Bandar Utama (previously known as Damansara Utama)	Jamaliah Jamaluddin (PH-DAP)	38,651	34,769	Chong Fook Meng (IND)	188	Yeo Bee Yin (PH-DAP)	30,689
N37	Bukit Lanjan	Wong Keat Ping (PH-PKR)	47,748	40,233	Syed Abdul Razak Syed Long Alsagof (BN-GERAKAN)	7,515	Wong Keat Ping (PH-PKR)	17,200
N38	Paya Jaras	Mohd Khairuddin Othman (PH-PKR)	20,376	12,072	Hanafi Zulkapli (GS-PAS)	6,042	Mohd Khairuddin Othman (PAS)	5,522
N38	Paya Jaras	Mohd Khairuddin Othman (PH-PKR)	20,376	12,072	Zein Isma Ismail (BN-UMNO)	8,304	Mohd Khairuddin Othman (PAS)	5,522
N39	Kota Damansara	Shatiri Mansor (PH-PKR)	26,440	15,703	Halimaton Saadiah Bohan (BN-UMNO)	10,737	Halimaton Saadiah Bohan (BN-UMNO)	1,527
N39	Kota Damansara	Shatiri Mansor (PH-PKR)	26,440	15,703	Siti Rohaya Ahad (GS-PAS)	5,633	Halimaton Saadiah Bohan (BN-UMNO)	1,527
N39	Kota Damansara	Shatiri Mansor (PH-PKR)	26,440	15,703	Sivarajan Arumugam (PSM)	435	Halimaton Saadiah Bohan (BN-UMNO)	1,527
N40	Kota Anggerik	Najwan Halimi (PH-PKR)	26,947	17,004	Ahmad Dusuki Abd Rani (GS-PAS)	9,943	Yaakob Sapari (PH-PKR)	4,503
N40	Kota Anggerik	Najwan Halimi (PH-PKR)	26,947	17,004	Jumaeah Masdi (BN-UMNO)	8,924	Yaakob Sapari (PH-PKR)	4,503
N41	Batu Tiga	Rodziah Ismail (PH-PKR)	27,638	15,616	Abdul Halim Omar (GS-PAS)	7,793	Rodziah Ismail (PH-PKR)	3,805
N41	Batu Tiga	Rodziah Ismail (PH-PKR)	27,638	15,616	Ahmad Mua'adzam Shah Ya'akop (BN-UMNO)	12,022	Rodziah Ismail (PH-PKR)	3,805
N42	Meru	Mohd. Fakhrulrazi Mohd Mokhtar (PH-AMANAH)	17,665	9,608	Noor Najhan Mohd Salleh (GS-PAS)	7,804	Abd Rani Osman (PAS)	9,079
N42	Meru	Mohd. Fakhrulrazi Mohd Mokhtar (PH-AMANAH)	17,665	9,608	Khairul Anuar Saimun (BN-UMNO)	8,057	Abd Rani Osman (PAS)	9,079
N42	Meru	Mohd. Fakhrulrazi Mohd Mokhtar (PH-AMANAH)	17,665	9,608	Shee Chee Weng (IND)	72	Abd Rani Osman (PAS)	9,079
N42	Meru	Mohd. Fakhrulrazi Mohd Mokhtar (PH-AMANAH)	17,665	9,608	Manikavasagam Sundaram (PRM)	346	Abd Rani Osman (PAS)	9,079
N43	Sementa	Daroyah Alwi (PH-PKR)	17,867	5,370	Wan Hasrina Wan Hassan (GS-PAS)	7,696	Daroyah Alwi (PH-PKR)	7,846
N43	Sementa	Daroyah Alwi (PH-PKR)	17,867	5,370	Saroni Judi (BN-UMNO)	12,497	Daroyah Alwi (PH-PKR)	7,846
N43	Sementa	Daroyah Alwi (PH-PKR)	17,867	5,370	Gandhi Nagamuthu (PRM)	120	Daroyah Alwi (PH-PKR)	7,846
N44	Selat Klang	Abdul Rashid Asari (PH-PPBM)	12,266	500	Halimah Ali (GS-PAS)	11,766	Halimah Ali (PAS)	2,754
N44	Selat Klang	Abdul Rashid Asari (PH-PPBM)	12,266	500	Mohd Khairi Hussin (BN-UMNO)	9,949	Halimah Ali (PAS)	2,754
N44	Selat Klang	Abdul Rashid Asari (PH-PPBM)	12,266	500	Jeichandran Wadivelu (PRM)	52	Halimah Ali (PAS)	2,754
N44	Selat Klang	Abdul Rashid Asari (PH-PPBM)	12,266	500	Zainal Azwar Kamaruddin (IND)	49	Halimah Ali (PAS)	2,754
N45	Bandar Baru Klang (previously known as Sungai Pinang)	Teng Chang Khim (PH-DAP)	44,926	39,828	Teoh Kah Yeong (BN-MCA)	5,098	Teng Chang Khim (PH-DAP)	11,309
N46	Pelabuhan Klang	Azmizam Zaman Huri (PH-PKR)	15,837	6,422	Khalid Nayan (GS-PAS)	2,925	Abdul Khalid Ibrahim (IND)	2,994
N46	Pelabuhan Klang	Azmizam Zaman Huri (PH-PKR)	15,837	6,422	Seikh Rajesh Seikh Ahmad (BN-UMNO)	9,415	Abdul Khalid Ibrahim (IND)	2,994
N46	Pelabuhan Klang	Azmizam Zaman Huri (PH-PKR)	15,837	6,422	Shanmugasundram Veerappan (PSM)	128	Abdul Khalid Ibrahim (IND)	2,994
N47	Pandamaran	Leong Tuck Chee (PH-DAP)	41,552	35,863	G.S. Santokh Singh (GS-IKATAN)	1,459	Tan Pok Shyong (PH-DAP)	9,176
N47	Pandamaran	Leong Tuck Chee (PH-DAP)	41,552	35,863	Tee Hooi Ling (BN-MCA)	5,689	Tan Pok Shyong (PH-DAP)	9,176
N48	Sentosa (previously known as Kota Alam Shah)	Gunarajah George (PH-PKR)	38,106	33,600	Rajan Manikesavan (GS-PAS)	1,722	Ganabatirau Veraman (PH-DAP)	13,369
N48	Sentosa (previously known as Kota Alam Shah)	Gunarajah George (PH-PKR)	38,106	33,600	R. Subramaniam (BN-MIC)	4,506	Ganabatirau Veraman (PH-DAP)	13,369
N48	Sentosa (previously known as Kota Alam Shah)	Gunarajah George (PH-PKR)	38,106	33,600	Sundarajoo A.Periasamy (IND)	95	Ganabatirau Veraman (PH-DAP)	13,369
N48	Sentosa (previously known as Kota Alam Shah)	Gunarajah George (PH-PKR)	38,106	33,600	M. Telai Amblam (PRM)	79	Ganabatirau Veraman (PH-DAP)	13,369
N49	Sungai Kadis (previously known as Seri Andalas)	Mat Shuhaimi Shafiei (PH-PKR)	23,998	12,480	Mohd Yusof Abdullah (GS-PAS)	7,573	Xavier Jayakumar Arulanandam (PH-PKR)	15,633
N49	Sungai Kadis (previously known as Seri Andalas)	Mat Shuhaimi Shafiei (PH-PKR)	23,998	12,480	Kamaruzzaman Johari (BN-UMNO)	11,518	Xavier Jayakumar Arulanandam (PH-PKR)	15,633
N49	Sungai Kadis (previously known as Seri Andalas)	Mat Shuhaimi Shafiei (PH-PKR)	23,998	12,480	Hanafiah Husin (PRM)	76	Xavier Jayakumar Arulanandam (PH-PKR)	15,633
N50	Kota Kemuning (previously known as Sri Muda)	Ganabatirau Veraman (PH-DAP)	28,617	21,639	Burhan Adnan (GS-PAS)	6,978	Mat Shuhaimi Shafiel (PH-PKR)	12,510
N50	Kota Kemuning (previously known as Sri Muda)	Ganabatirau Veraman (PH-DAP)	28,617	21,639	Tiew Hock Huat (BN-GERAKAN)	4,601	Mat Shuhaimi Shafiel (PH-PKR)	12,510
N50	Kota Kemuning (previously known as Sri Muda)	Ganabatirau Veraman (PH-DAP)	28,617	21,639	Abdul Razak Ismail (PSM)	226	Mat Shuhaimi Shafiel (PH-PKR)	12,510
N50	Kota Kemuning (previously known as Sri Muda)	Ganabatirau Veraman (PH-DAP)	28,617	21,639	Rajasekaran Soundaparandy (IND)	93	Mat Shuhaimi Shafiel (PH-PKR)	12,510
N51	Sijankang	Ahmad Yunus Hairi (GS-PAS)	12,688	1,677	Mohd Hamidi Abu Bakar (PH-PPBM)	11,011	Ahmad Yunus Hairi (PAS)	2,942
N51	Sijankang	Ahmad Yunus Hairi (GS-PAS)	12,688	1,677	Sulaiman Mohd Karli (BN-UMNO)	10,420	Ahmad Yunus Hairi (PAS)	2,942
N52	Banting (previously known as Teluk Datuk)	Lau Weng San (PH-DAP)	21,846	17,299	Ng Siok Hwa (BN-MCA)	4,547	Loh Chee Heng (IND)	5,391
N52	Banting (previously known as Teluk Datuk)	Lau Weng San (PH-DAP)	21,846	17,299	Tan Choon Swee (PRM)	311	Loh Chee Heng (IND)	5,391
N53	Morib	Hasnul Baharuddin (PH-AMANAH)	11,000	2,117	Mohammad Sallehuddin Hafiz (GS-PAS)	7,329	Hasnul Baharuddin (PH-AMANAH)	766
N53	Morib	Hasnul Baharuddin (PH-AMANAH)	11,000	2,117	Rozana Kamarulzaman (BN-UMNO)	8,883	Hasnul Baharuddin (PH-AMANAH)	766
N54	Tanjong Sepat	Borhan Aman Shah (PH-PKR)	9,828	2,704	Mohd Haslin Hassan (GS-PAS)	4,273	Mohd Haslin Hassan (PAS)	682
N54	Tanjong Sepat	Borhan Aman Shah (PH-PKR)	9,828	2,704	Karim Mansor (BN-UMNO)	7,124	Mohd Haslin Hassan (PAS)	682
N55	Dengkil	Adhif Syan Abdullah (PH-PPBM)	21,172	6,934	Shahrum Mohd Sharif (BN-UMNO)	14,238	Shahrum Mohd Sharif (BN-UMNO)	2,317
N55	Dengkil	Adhif Syan Abdullah (PH-PPBM)	21,172	6,934	Yusmi Haniff Ariffin (GS-PAS)	8,422	Shahrum Mohd Sharif (BN-UMNO)	2,317
N56	Sungai Pelek	Ronnie Liu (PH-DAP)	13,484	6,586	Rohaya Mohd Shahir (GS-PAS)	5,200	Lai Nyuk Lan (PH-DAP)	1,972
N56	Sungai Pelek	Ronnie Liu (PH-DAP)	13,484	6,586	Ng Chok Sin (BN-MCA)	6,898	Lai Nyuk Lan (PH-DAP)	1,972
N56	Sungai Pelek	Ronnie Liu (PH-DAP)	13,484	6,586	Harry Arul Raj Krishnan (PAP)	79	Lai Nyuk Lan (PH-DAP)	1,972

=== Seats that changed allegiance ===
No.	Seat	Previous Party (2013)	Current Party (2018)
N02	(Selangor) Sabak	Gagasan Sejahtera (PAS)	Pakatan Harapan (AMANAH)
N07	(Selangor) Batang Kali	Barisan Nasional (UMNO)	Pakatan Harapan (BERSATU)
N09	(Selangor) Permatang	Barisan Nasional (UMNO)	Pakatan Harapan (PKR)
N10	(Selangor) Bukit Melawati	Barisan Nasional (UMNO)	Pakatan Harapan (PKR)
N12	(Selangor) Jeram	Barisan Nasional (UMNO)	Pakatan Harapan (BERSATU)
N13	(Selangor) Kuang	Barisan Nasional (UMNO)	Pakatan Harapan (BERSATU)
N15	(Selangor) Taman Templer	Gagasan Sejahtera (PAS)	Pakatan Harapan (AMANAH)
N17	(Selangor) Gombak Setia	Gagasan Sejahtera (PAS)	Pakatan Harapan (PKR)
N18	(Selangor) Hulu Kelang	Gagasan Sejahtera (PAS)	Pakatan Harapan (AMANAH)
N20	(Selangor) Lembah Jaya	Gagasan Sejahtera (PAS)	Pakatan Harapan (PKR)
N21	(Selangor) Pandan Indah	Gagasan Sejahtera (PAS)	Pakatan Harapan (AMANAH)
N23	(Selangor) Dusun Tua	Gagasan Sejahtera (PAS)	Pakatan Harapan (DAP)
N24	(Selangor) Semenyih	Barisan Nasional (UMNO)	Pakatan Harapan (BERSATU)
N26	(Selangor) Sungai Ramal	Gagasan Sejahtera (PAS)	Pakatan Harapan (AMANAH)
N29	(Selangor) Seri Serdang	Gagasan Sejahtera (PAS)	Pakatan Harapan (AMANAH)
N38	(Selangor) Paya Jaras	Gagasan Sejahtera (PAS)	Pakatan Harapan (PKR)
N39	(Selangor) Kota Damansara	Barisan Nasional (UMNO)	Pakatan Harapan (PKR)
N42	(Selangor) Meru	Gagasan Sejahtera (PAS)	Pakatan Harapan (AMANAH)
N44	(Selangor) Selat Klang	Gagasan Sejahtera (PAS)	Pakatan Harapan (BERSATU)
N53	(Selangor) Morib	Gagasan Sejahtera (PAS)	Pakatan Harapan (AMANAH)
N54	(Selangor) Tanjong Sepat	Gagasan Sejahtera (PAS)	Pakatan Harapan (PKR)
N55	(Selangor) Dengkil	Barisan Nasional (UMNO)	Pakatan Harapan (BERSATU)

== Aftermath ==
As the results were announced in the evening of 9 May, it is recognised that Pakatan Harapan had won a super majority in Selangor state, securing the third term for the coalition the govern the state.

Azmin Ali, as the leader of Pakatan Harapan of Selangor, had seek audience with Sultan Sharafuddin Idris Shah on the morning of 10 May to informed the Sultan of the result. In the meeting, Azmin also informed the Sultan that Pakatan Harapan of Selangor had announced their support for him to be the returning Menteri Besar. Sultan Sharafuddin is satisfied with the explanation and elected Azmin as the Menteri Besar of Selangor. He was sworn in on the morning of 11 May in front of the Sultan, Tengku Permaisuri Norashikin and members of Selangor Council of the Royal Court at Balairung Seri, Istana Alam Shah. On 13 May, Azmin submitted a list of candidates of Selangor State Executive Council to the Sultan to be considered. The ruler of the state is satisfied with the candidates and they were sworn in at Istana Alam Shah on the next day. In the same ceremony, Sultan Sharafuddin delivered his first address after the general election. He expressed his disappointment over the fractions among the Malays during the election campaign and encouraged the people to reunite once again. The Sultan also reminded the elected state representatives to serve the people well and not to involve themselves with corruption.

However, the then Menteri Besar's name was announced as one of the ministers of the newly formed federal government on 18 May 2018. He was named to head the newly established Ministry of Economic Affairs. He was reportedly surprised by the nomination and had only known of it from Selangor State Secretary, Mohd. Amin Ahmad Ahya. He then arranges a meeting with the Prime Minister, Mahathir Mohamad to discuss his role in the government. Azmin seek audience again with the Sultan of Selangor to discuss the situation since he didn't want to hold the post Menteri Besar and Minister of Economic Affairs at the same time. Selangor Royal Office then released a statement saying that the Sultan had given permission for Azmin to join the federal government and that he will held the Menteri Besar post for the time being while the Sultan consider several candidates to replace him.

On 30 May, Selangor Royal Office released a statement announcing that the swearing in ceremony of the new Menteri Besar would be held on 19 June, after Eid-ul Fitr and Azmin Ali released his position on the same day. Amirudin Shari, the seat holder of Sungai Tua state constituency and a member of Selangor State Executive Council was appointed as the new Selangor Menteri Besar by the Sultan. His swearing in ceremony was held at Istana Alam Shah on 19 June per scheduled.

== See also ==
- Elections in Selangor
- List of Malaysian State Assembly Representatives (2018-)#Selangor
- Selangor State Legislative Assembly
- Selangor State Executive Council
- 2018 Malaysian state elections
- 2018 Malaysian general election
- Snap election
- Recall election
