= 2018 Malaysian state elections =

2018 Malaysian state election
- 9 May 2018

12 out of 13 state legislative (DUN)
- Results of the elections: Pakatan Harapan hold Pakatan Harapan gain Barisan Nasional hold Gagasan Sejahtera hold Gagasan Sejahtera gain Hung Parliament; No election/Federal Territories

State elections were held in all states and territories in Malaysia except Sarawak on 9 May 2018, alongside general elections. Pakatan Harapan alliance received over 50% of the vote across the 12 states and territories where elections took place and won the most seats. They emerged as the largest faction in all states and territories except Kelantan, Terengganu, Perlis and Pahang. These are last election for Sabah, Johor, Malacca, Negeri Sembilan, Selangor, Kedah, Kelantan, Terengganu and Penang parallel with general election because of own issue of states.

== Results ==
Summary of the 2018 Malaysian Dewan Undangan Negeri election results ** Fraction of total popular votes in each state rounded to the nearest percent * Fraction of total seats in each state rounded to the nearest percent ± Change in number of seats from before the election
State / federal territory	Barisan Nasional					Pakatan Harapan					Gagasan Sejahtera					Other / Independent				
State / federal territory	Votes	%	Seats	%	±	Votes	%	Seats	%	±	Votes	%	Seats	%	±	Votes	%	Seats	%	±
Johor	582,265	38.8	19	33.9	18	803,148	53.6	36	64.3	20	113,216	7.6	1	1.8	2	721	0	0	0	0
Kedah	278,694	29.6	3	8.3	17	343,519	36.5	18	50	9	313,171	33.7	15	41.7	8	930	0.1	0	0	0
Kelantan	308,639	37.6	8	17.8	4	82,243	10.0	0	0	2	426,602	52.0	37	82.2	6	3,064	0.4	0	0	0
Malacca	156,318	37.8	13	46.4	8	211,153	51.1	15	53.6	9	44,537	10.8	0	0	1	1,148	0.3	0	0	0
Negeri Sembilan	182,294	38.0	16	44.4	6	258,737	53.9	20	55.6	6	35,913	7.5	0	0	0	3,059	0.6	0	0	0
Pahang	275,766	41.8	25	59.5	5	190,711	28.9	9	21.4	1	192,176	29.1	8	19.0	6	1,510	0.2	0	0	0
Penang	176,723	22.4	2	5.0	8	530,008	67.2	37	92.5	8	77,171	9.8	1	2.5	0	4,785	0.6	0	0	0
Perak	395,708	33.3	27	45.0	4	595,219	50.1	29	48.3	5	194,735	16.4	3	5.1	1	2,979	0.3	0	0	0
Perlis	47,151	39.0	10	66.7	3	42,220	34.9	3	20.0	2	31,335	25.9	2	13.3	1	132	0.1	0	0	0
Sabah	355,091	42.0	29	48.3	19	398,340	47.2	29	48.3	18	11,241	1.3	0	0.0	0	79.945	9.5	2	3.3	1
Selangor	450,742	21.9	4	7.1	8	1,303,102	63.4	51	91.1	20	296,250	14.4	1	1.8	12	6,324	0.3	0	0	0
Terengganu	261,653	42.2	10	31.3	7	45,429	7.3	0	0	1	313,503	50.5	22	67.8	8	0	0	0	0	0
Total	3,471,044	27.4	168	32.9	107	7,132,462	56.3	247	48.9	93	2,049,850	16.2	90	17.8	13	24,732	0.2	2	0.4	1

=== Perlis ===
Party or alliance		Votes	%	Seats	+/–
Barisan Nasional	United Malays National Organisation	42,543	35.21	9	–3
Barisan Nasional	Malaysian Chinese Association	4,608	3.81	1	0
Barisan Nasional	Total	47,151	39.02	10	–3
Pakatan Harapan	People's Justice Party	17,935	14.84	3	+2
Pakatan Harapan	Malaysian United Indigenous Party	12,562	10.40	0	0
Pakatan Harapan	National Trust Party	9,103	7.53	0	0
Pakatan Harapan	Democratic Action Party	2,620	2.17	0	0
Pakatan Harapan	Total	42,220	34.94	3	+2
Pan-Malaysian Islamic Party		31,335	25.93	2	+1
Independents		132	0.11	0	0
Total		120,838	100.00	15	0
Valid votes		120,838	98.21		
Invalid/blank votes		2,198	1.79		
Total votes		123,036	100.00		
Registered voters/turnout		150,221	81.90		
Source: BERNAMA

=== Kedah ===
Party or alliance		Votes	%	Seats	+/–
Pakatan Harapan	People's Justice Party	143,812	15.29	7	+3
Pakatan Harapan	Malaysian United Indigenous Party	114,838	12.21	5	New
Pakatan Harapan	National Trust Party	61,900	6.58	4	New
Pakatan Harapan	Democratic Action Party	22,969	2.44	2	–
Pakatan Harapan	Total	343,519	36.53	18	+12
Gagasan Sejahtera	Pan-Malaysian Islamic Party	317,171	33.73	15	+6
Barisan Nasional	United Malays National Organisation	226,273	24.06	3	–16
Barisan Nasional	Malaysian Chinese Association	24,616	2.62	0	–2
Barisan Nasional	Malaysian Indian Congress	16,938	1.80	0	0
Barisan Nasional	Parti Gerakan Rakyat Malaysia	10,867	1.16	0	0
Barisan Nasional	Total	278,694	29.64	3	–18
Parti Rakyat Malaysia		204	0.02	0	0
Independents		726	0.08	0	0
Total		940,314	100.00	36	0
Valid votes		940,314	98.56		
Invalid/blank votes		13,725	1.44		
Total votes		954,039	100.00		
Registered voters/turnout		1,146,492	83.21		
Source: Malaysiakini

=== Kelantan ===
Party or alliance		Votes	%	Seats	+/–
Gagasan Sejahtera	Pan-Malaysian Islamic Party	426,602	51.99	37	+6
Barisan Nasional	United Malays National Organisation	303,137	36.94	8	-4
Barisan Nasional	Malaysian Chinese Association	5,502	0.67	0	0
Barisan Nasional	Total	308,639	37.61	8	-4
Pakatan Harapan	National Trust Party	49,763	6.06	0	New
Pakatan Harapan	Malaysian United Indigenous Party	20,075	2.45	0	New
Pakatan Harapan	People's Justice Party	12,405	1.51	0	-1
Pakatan Harapan	Total	82,243	10.02	0	-1
Socialist Party of Malaysia		54	0.01	0	0
Independent		3,035	0.37	0	0
Total		820,573	100.00	45	0
Valid votes		820,573	98.53		
Invalid/blank votes		12,280	1.47		
Total votes		832,853	100.00		
Registered voters/turnout		1,049,527	79.36		
Source: SPR

=== Terengganu ===
Party or alliance		Votes	%	Seats	+/–
Gagasan Sejahtera	Pan-Malaysian Islamic Party	313,503	50.46	22	+8
Barisan Nasional	United Malays National Organisation	256,611	41.30	10	–7
Barisan Nasional	Malaysian Chinese Association	5,042	0.81	0	0
Barisan Nasional	Total	261,653	42.11	10	–7
Pakatan Harapan	People's Justice Party	19,167	3.08	0	–1
Pakatan Harapan	National Trust Party	15,303	2.46	0	0
Pakatan Harapan	Malaysian United Indigenous Party	11,680	1.88	0	0
Pakatan Harapan	Total	45,429	7.31	0	–1
Total		621,306	100.00	32	0
Valid votes		621,306	98.80		
Invalid/blank votes		7,520	1.20		
Total votes		628,826	100.00		
Registered voters/turnout		736,632	85.37		
Source: SPR

=== Penang ===
Party or alliance		Votes	%	Seats	+/–
Pakatan Harapan	Democratic Action Party	301,343	38.21	19	0
Pakatan Harapan	People's Justice Party	184,350	23.37	14	+4
Pakatan Harapan	Malaysian United Indigenous Party	16,988	2.15	2	New
Pakatan Harapan	National Trust Party	27,327	3.46	2	New
Pakatan Harapan	Total	530,008	67.20	37	+8
Barisan Nasional	United Malays National Organisation	101,761	12.90	2	–8
Barisan Nasional	Parti Gerakan Rakyat Malaysia	43,092	5.46	0	0
Barisan Nasional	Malaysian Chinese Association	25,758	3.27	0	0
Barisan Nasional	Malaysian Indian Congress	6,112	0.77	0	0
Barisan Nasional	Total	176,723	22.41	2	–8
Gagasan Sejahtera	Pan-Malaysian Islamic Party	76,746	9.73	1	0
Gagasan Sejahtera	People's Alternative Party	342	0.04	0	0
Gagasan Sejahtera	Love Malaysia Party	83	0.01	0	0
Gagasan Sejahtera	Total	77,171	9.78	1	0
Malaysian United Party		2,366	0.30	0	0
Parti Rakyat Malaysia		1,190	0.15	0	0
Penang Front Party		631	0.08	0	0
Socialist Party of Malaysia		223	0.03	0	0
Independents		375	0.05	0	0
Total		788,687	100.00	40	0
Valid votes		788,687	98.57		
Invalid/blank votes		11,471	1.43		
Total votes		800,158	100.00		
Registered voters/turnout		945,627	84.62		
Source: The Star

=== Perak ===
Party or alliance		Votes	%	Seats	+/–
Pakatan Harapan	Democratic Action Party	361,521	30.41	18	0
Pakatan Harapan	National Trust Party	101,773	8.56	6	New
Pakatan Harapan	Malaysian United Indigenous Party	69,299	5.83	1	New
Pakatan Harapan	People's Justice Party	62,626	5.27	4	–1
Pakatan Harapan	Total	595,219	50.07	29	+6
Barisan Nasional	United Malays National Organisation	303,022	25.49	27	–3
Barisan Nasional	Malaysian Chinese Association	69,542	5.85	0	–1
Barisan Nasional	Parti Gerakan Rakyat Malaysia	15,571	1.31	0	0
Barisan Nasional	Malaysian Indian Congress	7,573	0.64	0	0
Barisan Nasional	Total	395,708	33.29	27	–4
Gagasan Sejahtera	Malaysian Islamic Party	194,735	16.38	3	–2
Gagasan Sejahtera	Pan-Malaysian Islamic Front	211	0.02	0	0
Gagasan Sejahtera	Total	194,946	16.40	3	–2
Socialist Party of Malaysia		2,551	0.21	0	0
Independents		277	0.02	0	0
Total		1,188,701	100.00	59	0
Valid votes		1,188,701	98.38		
Invalid/blank votes		19,564	1.62		
Total votes		1,208,265	100.00		
Registered voters/turnout		1,510,864	79.97		
Source: SPR

=== Pahang ===
Party or alliance		Votes	%	Seats	+/–
Barisan Nasional	United Malays National Organisation	220,715	33.32	24	–4
Barisan Nasional	Malaysian Chinese Association	40,241	6.08	1	–1
Barisan Nasional	Parti Gerakan Rakyat Malaysia	10,931	1.65	0	0
Barisan Nasional	Malaysian Indian Congress	3,879	0.59	0	0
Barisan Nasional	Total	275,766	41.64	25	–5
Gagasan Sejahtera	Malaysian Islamic Party	192,203	29.02	8	+5
Pakatan Harapan	People's Justice Party	64,338	9.71	2	0
Pakatan Harapan	Democratic Action Party	71,396	10.78	7	0
Pakatan Harapan	National Trust Party	42,381	6.40	0	New
Pakatan Harapan	Malaysian United Indigenous Party	14,722	2.22	0	New
Pakatan Harapan	Total	192,837	29.12	9	0
Socialist Party of Malaysia		229	0.03	0	0
Independents		1,281	0.19	0	0
Total		662,316	100.00	42	0
Valid votes		662,316	97.88		
Invalid/blank votes		14,364	2.12		
Total votes		676,680	100.00		
Registered voters/turnout		823,981	82.12		
Source: SPR, ElectionData.MY

=== Selangor ===
Party or alliance		Votes	%	Seats	+/–
Pakatan Harapan	Democratic Action Party	515,649	25.08	16	+1
Pakatan Harapan	People's Justice Party	498,927	24.26	21	+7
Pakatan Harapan	National Trust Party	172,937	8.41	8	+8
Pakatan Harapan	Malaysian United Indigenous Party	115,589	5.62	6	+6
Pakatan Harapan	Total	1,303,102	63.37	51	22
Barisan Nasional	United Malays National Organisation	334,152	16.25	4	–8
Barisan Nasional	Malaysian Chinese Association	78,781	3.83	0	0
Barisan Nasional	Parti Gerakan Rakyat Malaysia	20,431	0.99	0	0
Barisan Nasional	Malaysian Indian Congress	17,378	0.85	0	0
Barisan Nasional	Total	450,742	21.92	4	–8
Gagasan Sejahtera	Malaysian Islamic Party	286,227	13.92	1	–14
Gagasan Sejahtera	Malaysia National Alliance Party	10,023	0.49	0	0
Gagasan Sejahtera	Total	296,250	14.41	1	–14
Parti Rakyat Malaysia		2,111	0.10	0	0
Socialist Party of Malaysia		2,082	0.10	0	0
People's Alternative Party		187	0.01	0	0
Independents		1,944	0.09	0	0
Total		2,056,418	100.00	56	0
Valid votes		2,056,418	99.11		
Invalid/blank votes		18,473	0.89		
Total votes		2,074,891	100.00		
Registered voters/turnout		2,415,074	85.91		
Source: SPR

=== Negeri Sembilan ===
Party or alliance		Votes	%	Seats	+/–
Pakatan Harapan	Democratic Action Party	127,259	26.51	11	0
Pakatan Harapan	People's Justice Party	67,908	14.15	6	+3
Pakatan Harapan	National Trust Party	42,617	8.88	3	New
Pakatan Harapan	Malaysian United Indigenous Party	20,953	4.37	0	New
Pakatan Harapan	Total	258,737	53.90	20	+6
Barisan Nasional	United Malays National Organisation	134,014	27.92	15	-6
Barisan Nasional	Malaysian Chinese Association	34,245	7.13	0	0
Barisan Nasional	Malaysian Indian Congress	7,038	1.47	1	0
Barisan Nasional	Parti Gerakan Rakyat Malaysia	6,997	1.46	0	0
Barisan Nasional	Total	182,294	37.98	16	-6
Gagasan Sejahtera	Malaysian Islamic Party	35,913	7.48	0	0
People's Alternative Party		404	0.08	0	New
Independents		2,655	0.55	0	0
Total		480,003	100.00	36	0
Valid votes		480,003	98.12		
Invalid/blank votes		9,215	1.88		
Total votes		489,218	100.00		
Registered voters/turnout		607,793	80.49		
Source: SPR, The Star, ElectionData.MY

=== Malacca ===
Party or alliance		Votes	%	Seats	+/–
Pakatan Harapan	Democratic Action Party	99,637	24.12	8	+2
Pakatan Harapan	People's Justice Party	50,220	12.16	3	+3
Pakatan Harapan	Malaysian United Indigenous Party	32,107	7.77	2	New
Pakatan Harapan	National Trust Party	29,189	7.06	2	New
Pakatan Harapan	Total	211,153	51.11	15	+9
Barisan Nasional	United Malays National Organisation	104,270	25.24	13	–4
Barisan Nasional	Malaysian Chinese Association	41,492	10.04	0	–3
Barisan Nasional	Parti Gerakan Rakyat Malaysia	6,471	1.57	0	0
Barisan Nasional	Malaysian Indian Congress	4,085	0.99	0	–1
Barisan Nasional	Total	156,318	37.84	13	–8
Gagasan Sejahtera	Pan-Malaysian Islamic Party	44,537	10.78	0	–1
Independents		1,148	0.28	0	0
Total		413,156	100.00	28	0
Valid votes		413,156	98.30		
Invalid/blank votes		7,143	1.70		
Total votes		420,299	100.00		
Registered voters/turnout		494,662	84.97		
Source: ElectionData.MY

=== Johor ===
Party or alliance		Votes	%	Seats	+/–
Pakatan Harapan	Democratic Action Party	312,183	20.73	14	+1
Pakatan Harapan	Malaysian United Indigenous Party	214,703	14.26	8	New
Pakatan Harapan	National Trust Party	161,656	10.74	9	New
Pakatan Harapan	People's Justice Party	114,884	7.63	5	+4
Pakatan Harapan	Total	803,426	53.36	36	+22
Barisan Nasional	United Malays National Organisation	379,886	25.23	17	–15
Barisan Nasional	Malaysian Chinese Association	145,154	9.64	0	–2
Barisan Nasional	Malaysian Indian Congress	42,502	2.82	2	–1
Barisan Nasional	Parti Gerakan Rakyat Malaysia	14,989	1.00	0	–1
Barisan Nasional	Total	582,531	38.69	19	–19
Pan-Malaysian Islamic Party		118,582	7.88	1	-3
Independent		1,226	0.08	0	-
Total		1,505,765	100.00	56	0
Valid votes		1,505,765	98.02		
Invalid/blank votes		30,416	1.98		
Total votes		1,536,181	100.00		
Registered voters/turnout		1,817,999	84.50		

=== Sabah ===
Party or alliance		Votes	%	Seats	+/–
Barisan Nasional	United Malays National Organisation	208,600	24.71	17	–14
Barisan Nasional	United Sabah Party	70,998	8.41	6	–1
Barisan Nasional	United Pasokmomogun Kadazandusun Murut Organisation	33,395	3.96	5	+1
Barisan Nasional	Liberal Democratic Party	15,084	1.79	0	–3
Barisan Nasional	Malaysian Chinese Association	14,970	1.77	0	0
Barisan Nasional	Parti Bersatu Rakyat Sabah	8,042	0.95	1	0
Barisan Nasional	Parti Gerakan Rakyat Malaysia	4,002	0.47	0	–2
Barisan Nasional	Total	355,091	42.05	29	–19
Sabah Heritage Party		271,446	32.15	21	New
Pakatan Harapan	Democratic Action Party	78,901	9.34	6	+2
Pakatan Harapan	People's Justice Party	47,723	5.65	2	–5
Pakatan Harapan	National Trust Party	193	0.02	0	0
Pakatan Harapan	Total	126,817	15.02	8	–3
United Sabah Alliance	Homeland Solidarity Party	39,803	4.71	2	+1
United Sabah Alliance	Sabah People's Hope Party	17,713	2.10	0	0
United Sabah Alliance	Sabah Progressive Party	5,031	0.60	0	0
United Sabah Alliance	Sabah People's Unity Party	1,491	0.18	0	0
United Sabah Alliance	Total	63,978	7.58	2	+2
Gagasan Sejahtera	Pan-Malaysian Islamic Party	11,241	1.33	0	0
Love Sabah Party		9,311	1.10	0	0
Sabah Native Co-operation Party		3,059	0.36	0	0
Sabah Nationality Party		2,018	0.24	0	0
United Sabah National Organisation (New)		147	0.02	0	0
State Reform Party		109	0.01	0	0
Independents		1,079	0.13	0	0
Total		844,356	100.00	60	0
Valid votes		844,356	97.42		
Invalid/blank votes		22,369	2.58		
Total votes		866,725	100.00		
Registered voters/turnout		1,117,877	77.53		
Source: Election Commission of Malaysia
