= Pua Pei Ling =

Malaysian politician

Yang Berhormat Puan Pua Pei Ling MLA
- 潘佩玲

Member of the Selangor State Legislative Assembly for Bukit Lanjan
- Incumbent
- Assumed office 12 August 2023
- Preceded by: Elizabeth Wong Keat Ping (PH–PKR)
- Majority: 41,227 (2023)

Personal details
- Born: Pua Pei Ling; 1992 (age 33–34) Rawang, Selangor, Malaysia
- Citizenship: Malaysian
- Party: People's Justice Party (PKR)
- Other political affiliations: Pakatan Harapan (PH)
- Occupation: Politician

Pua Pei Ling

Chinese name
- Traditional Chinese: 潘佩玲
- Simplified Chinese: 潘佩玲
Transcriptions
Standard Mandarin
- Hanyu Pinyin: Pān Pèilíng

Pua Pei Ling (Chinese: 潘佩玲; pinyin: Pān Pèilíng; born 1992) is a Malaysian politician who has served as Member of the Selangor State Legislative Assembly (MLA) for Bukit Lanjan since August 2023. She is a member of the People's Justice Party (PKR), a component party of the Pakatan Harapan (PH) coalition. She served as an assistant to former MLA for Rawang Gan Pei Nei from 2013 to 2018 and Development Officer of Gombak from 2018 to 2023. She has also served as the committee member and Women Secretary of PKR of Damansara since 2022.

== Political career ==
=== Member of the Selangor State Legislative Assembly (since 2023) ===
==== 2023 Selangor state election ====
In the 2023 Selangor state election, Pua made her electoral debut after being nominated by PH to contest the Bukit Lanjan state seat. Pua won the seat and was elected to the Selangor State Legislative Assembly as the Bukit Lanjan MLA after defeating Muniraa Abu Bakar of Perikatan Nasional (PN) by a majority of 41,227 votes.

During the campaigning period of the election, Pua created a slogan of the Chinese language, namely "认真做事，贴近民心", literally 'do things seriously, be close to hearts of the people'. She noted that Bukit Lanjan is the state seat with the highest proportion of Chinese voters in the ethnic demographics of voters that her party PKR contested, followed by Rawang and Kajang. She also said the Seri Damansara voters have complained to her about the issue of illegal stalls that affected the traffic. She also stressed that during her tenure as a development officer, she was constantly paying attention to road safety and street lighting issues in new villages, and she was a firm believer that a safer home leads the residents to higher quality of life.

As the Bukit Lanjan MLA, Pua used her experience as a development officer and MLA assistant that turned her into a bridge and connection of communication between the local government and people and pledged to seek advice from her predecessor Elizabeth Wong Keat Ping, push for the development of Bukit Lanjan, keep a good relationship with aboriginal people, explain the latest political situation to the voters, make road traffic safety, community development, needs of the Malays and people of other races, youngsters and women her priorities, take good care of Bukit Lanjan and carry out the work of Bukit Lanjan MLA well. In addition, Pua also revealed that she was ready to face the higher demands by the people if PH was reelected to power.

On 16 November 2023, she urged all Selangor MLAs to donate RM 5,000 respectively to the Selangor Assembly Donation Fund that was set up to aid and support by providing the daily necessities for the Palestinians who were suffering as a result of the Gaza war.

== Election results ==
Selangor State Legislative Assembly
Year	Constituency	Candidate	Votes	Pct	Opponent(s)	Votes	Pct	Ballots cast	Majority	Turnout
2023	N37 Bukit Lanjan	Pua Pei Ling (PKR)	57,051	78.29%	Muniraa Abu Bakar (Gerakan)	15,824	21.71%	72,875	41,227	65.90%
