= Sekinchan (state constituency) =

State constituency in Selangor, Malaysia

Sekinchan (N04)
Selangor constituency

State constituency
- Legislature: Selangor State Legislative Assembly
MLA
Ng Suee Lim
PH
- Constituency created: 1974
- First contested: 1974
- Last contested: 2023

Demographics
- Electors (2023): 23,936

Sekinchan is a state constituency in Selangor, Malaysia, that has been represented in the Selangor State Legislative Assembly since 1974. It has been represented by Member of the Selangor State Executive Council (EXCO) Ng Suee Lim of Pakatan Harapan (PH) since 2015, Pakatan Rakyat (PR) from 2008 to 2015, Democratic Action Party (DAP) from 2004 to 2008.

The state constituency was created in the 1974 redistribution and is represented by a single member in the Selangor State Legislative Assembly, chosen under the first-past-the-post voting system.

== Demographics ==
Ethnic breakdown of Sekinchan's electorate as of 2023
1. Chinese (51.6%)
2. Malay (43.9%)
3. Indian (2.93%)
4. Other ethnicities (1.52%)

== History ==
=== Polling districts ===
According to the federal gazette issued on 30 March 2018, the Sekinchan constituency is divided into 11 polling districts.

State constituency	Polling districts	Code	Location
Sekinchan（N04）	Sungai Leman Bendang Utara	093/04/01	SK Parit 9 Sungai Leman Sekinchan
Sekinchan（N04）	Sungai Leman Bendang Tengah	093/04/02	SK Parit 9 Sungai Leman Sekinchan
Sekinchan（N04）	Sungai Leman Bendang Selatan	093/04/03	SRA Parit 7 Ban 2 Sungai Leman
Sekinchan（N04）	Sungai Leman Kampung Darat	093/04/04	SK Sungai Leman
Sekinchan（N04）	Sungai Leman Kampung Laut	093/04/05	SRA Parit 9 Sungai Leman Sekinchan
Sekinchan（N04）	Sekinchan Selatan	093/04/06	SJK (C) Yoke Kuan Sekinchan
Sekinchan（N04）	Sekinchan Tempatan Selatan	093/04/07	SRA Harmoni Taman Ria
Sekinchan（N04）	Sekinchan Tempatan Tengah	093/04/08	SMJK Yoke Kuan Sekinchan
Sekinchan（N04）	Sekinchan Tempatan (Site B)	093/04/09	SMJK Yoke Kuan Sekinchan
Sekinchan（N04）	Kian Sit	093/04/10	SJK (C) Kian Sit
Sekinchan（N04）	Sekinchan	093/04/11	Sk Seri Sekinchan

=== Representation history ===
Members of the Legislative Assembly for Sekinchan
Assembly	No	Years	Member	Party
Constituency created from Tanjong Karang
4th	N05	1974–1978	Mohamed Kassim Mohamed Yusof	BN (UMNO)
5th	N05	1978–1982	Mohamed Kassim Mohamed Yusof	BN (UMNO)
6th	N05	1982–1986	Tan Kui Sui @ Tan Kai See (陈葵士)	BN (MCA)
7th	N05	1986–1990	Sim Keng Seik (沈敬斯)	BN (MCA)
8th	N05	1990–1995	Sim Keng Seik (沈敬斯)	BN (MCA)
9th	N05	1995–1999	Chia Kim Lem (謝錦龍)	BN (MCA)
10th	N05	1999–2004	Chia Kim Lem (謝錦龍)	BN (MCA)
11th	N04	2004–2008	Ng Suee Lim (黃瑞林)	DAP
12th	N04	2008–2013	Ng Suee Lim (黃瑞林)	PR (DAP)
13th	N04	2013–2015	Ng Suee Lim (黃瑞林)	PR (DAP)
13th	N04	2015–2018	Ng Suee Lim (黃瑞林)	PH (DAP)
14th	N04	2018–2023	Ng Suee Lim (黃瑞林)	PH (DAP)
15th	N04	2023–present	Ng Suee Lim (黃瑞林)	PH (DAP)

== Election results ==
Selangor state election, 2023
Party	Candidate	Votes	%	∆%
PH	Ng Suee Lim	10,232	62.22	▲10.60
PN	Goh Gaik Meng	6,214	37.78	▲37.78
Total valid votes		16,446	100.00	
Total rejected ballots		157		
Unreturned ballots		25		
Turnout		16,628	69.47	▼16.02
Registered electors		23,936		
Majority		4,018	24.44	▲5.77
PH hold		Swing		

Selangor state election, 2018
Party	Candidate	Votes	%	∆%
PKR	Ng Suee Lim	7,863	51.62	▲51.62
BN	Lee Yee Yuan	5,019	32.95	▼9.04
PAS	Mohd Fadzin Taslimin	2,351	15.43	▲15.43
Total valid votes		15,233	100.00	
Total rejected ballots		201		
Unreturned ballots		31		
Turnout		15,475	85.49	▼2.61
Registered electors		18,101		
Majority		2,844	18.67	▲2.65
PH hold		Swing		

Selangor state election, 2013
Party	Candidate	Votes	%	∆%
DAP	Ng Suee Lim	8,107	58.01	▲7.12
BN	Kek Seng Hooi	5,868	41.99	▼7.12
Total valid votes		13,975	100.00	
Total rejected ballots		299		
Unreturned ballots		40		
Turnout		14,314	88.10	▲6.90
Registered electors		16,247		
Majority		2,239	16.02	▲14.24
DAP hold		Swing		
Source(s) "Federal Government Gazette - Notice of Contested Election, State Legislative Assembly for the State of Selangor [P.U. (B) 192/2013]" (PDF). Attorney General's Chambers of Malaysia. 26 April 2013. Archived from the original (PDF) on 2019-12-29. "Federal Government Gazette - Results of Contested Election and Statements of the Poll after the Official Addition of Votes, State Constituencies for the State of Selangor [P.U. (B) 233/2013]". Attorney General's Chambers of Malaysia. 22 May 2013. Archived from the original (PDF) on 2018-10-02.

Selangor state election, 2008
Party	Candidate	Votes	%	∆%
DAP	Ng Suee Lim	5,403	50.89	▼0.93
BN	Puah Boon Choon	5,213	49.11	▲0.93
Total valid votes		10,616	100.00	
Total rejected ballots		317		
Unreturned ballots		88		
Turnout		11,021	81.20	▲5.15
Registered electors		13,573		
Majority		190	1.78	▼1.86
DAP hold		Swing		

Selangor state election, 2004
Party	Candidate	Votes	%	∆%
DAP	Ng Suee Lim	4,903	51.82	▲14.51
BN	Chia Kim Lem	4,559	48.18	▼9.59
Total valid votes		9,462	100.00	
Total rejected ballots		386		
Unreturned ballots		0		
Turnout		9,848	76.05	▲4.38
Registered electors		12,949		
Majority		344	3.64	▼16.82
DAP gain from BN		Swing		?

Selangor state election, 1999
Party	Candidate	Votes	%	∆%
BN	Chia Kim Lem	5,772	57.77	▼14.08
DAP	Ng Suee Lim	3,728	37.31	▲9.16
Independent	Saari Kiban	492	4.92	▲4.92
Total valid votes		9,992	100.00	
Total rejected ballots		414		
Unreturned ballots		0		
Turnout		10,406	71.67	▲2.72
Registered electors		14,519		
Majority		2,044	20.46	▼23.24
BN hold		Swing		

Selangor state election, 1995
Party	Candidate	Votes	%	∆%
BN	Chia Kim Lem	6,244	71.85	▲17.56
DAP	Loo Kim Yong	2,446	28.15	▼17.56
Total valid votes		8,690	100.00	
Total rejected ballots		747		
Unreturned ballots		0		
Turnout		9,437	68.95	▼3.75
Registered electors		13,687		
Majority		3,798	43.71	▲35.12
BN hold		Swing		

Selangor state election, 1990
Party	Candidate	Votes	%	∆%
BN	Sim Keng Seik	4,378	54.29	▼0.77
DAP	Hairuddin Jantan	3,686	45.71	▲21.41
Total valid votes		8,064	100.00	
Total rejected ballots		370		
Unreturned ballots		6		
Turnout		8,440	72.70	▲5.36
Registered electors		11,610		
Majority		692	8.58	▼22.18
BN hold		Swing		

Selangor state election, 1986
Party	Candidate	Votes	%	∆%
BN	Sim Keng Seik	3,963	55.06	▼4.01
DAP	Low Sek Moah	1,749	24.30	▲1.83
PAS	Salleh Hassan	1,485	20.63	▲2.17
Total valid votes		7,197	100.00	
Total rejected ballots		413		
Unreturned ballots		0		
Turnout		7,610	67.34	▼3.05
Registered electors		11,301		
Majority		2,214	30.76	▼5.84
BN hold		Swing		

Selangor state election, 1982
Party	Candidate	Votes	%	∆%
BN	Tan Kui Sui @ Tan Kai See	4,336	59.07	▲3.66
DAP	Lau Sek Noah	1,649	22.47	▲22.47
PAS	Shaari Saet	1,355	18.46	▲0.49
Total valid votes		7,340	100.00	
Total rejected ballots		244		
Unreturned ballots		0		
Turnout		7,584	70.39	▼0.90
Registered electors		10,774		
Majority		2,687	36.61	▲7.82
BN hold		Swing		

Selangor state election, 1978
Party	Candidate	Votes	%	∆%
BN	Mohamed Kassim Mohamed Yusof	3,821	55.41	▼6.79
PEKEMAS	Ang Par Wong	1,836	26.62	▼2.53
PAS	Ibrahim Non	1,239	17.97	▲17.97
Total valid votes		6,896	100.00	
Total rejected ballots		486		
Unreturned ballots		0		
Turnout		7,382	71.30	▲0.86
Registered electors		10,354		
Majority		1,985	28.78	▼4.26
BN hold		Swing		

Selangor state election, 1974
Party	Candidate	Votes	%
BN	Mohamed Kassim Mohamed Yusof	3,256	62.20
PEKEMAS	Tan Ban Kow	1,526	29.15
Independent	Wan Husin Masior	352	6.72
Independent	Ismail Amil	101	1.93
Total valid votes		5,235	100.00
Total valid votes		5,235	100.00
Total rejected ballots		141	
Unreturned ballots		0	
Turnout		5,376	70.44
Registered electors		7,632	
Majority		1,730	33.05
This was a new constituency created.
