= Bukit Lanjan (state constituency) =

State constituency in Selangor, Malaysia

Bukit Lanjan (N37)
Selangor constituency

State constituency
- Legislature: Selangor State Legislative Assembly
MLA
Pua Pei Ling
PH
- Constituency created: 1994
- First contested: 1995
- Last contested: 2023

Demographics
- Electors (2023): 110,538

Bukit Lanjan is a state constituency in Selangor, Malaysia, that has been represented in the Selangor State Legislative Assembly since 1995. It has been represented by Pua Pei Ling of Pakatan Harapan (PH) since 2023.

The state constituency was created in the 1994 redistribution and is mandated to return a single member to the Selangor State Legislative Assembly under the first past the post voting system.

== Demographics ==
Ethnic breakdown of Bukit Lanjan's electorate as of 2023
1. Chinese (58.2%)
2. Malay (27.6%)
3. Indian (10.8%)
4. Other ethnicities (3.37%)

== History ==
=== Polling districts ===
According to the federal gazette issued on 30 March 2018, the Bukit Lanjan constituency is divided into 21 polling districts.

State constituency	Polling Districts	Code	Location
Bukit Lanjan（N37）	Desa Jaya Jalan 1 - Jalan 19	106/37/01	SJK (C) Desa Jaya
Bukit Lanjan（N37）	Sri Damansara Jalan SD 1 - Jalan SD 5	106/37/02	SK Bandar Baru Sri Damansara
Bukit Lanjan（N37）	Sri Damansara Jalan SD 7 - Jalan SD 9	106/37/03	SK Bandar Sri Damanaara 3
Bukit Lanjan（N37）	Bukit Lanjan	106/37/04	SK Bukit Lanjan (Asli) Bandar Damansara Perdana
Bukit Lanjan（N37）	Desa Jaya Jalan 20 - Jalan 38	106/37/05	SJK (C) Desa Jaya
Bukit Lanjan（N37）	Desa Jaya Jalan 39 - Jalan 56	106/37/06	SJK (C) Desa Jaya
Bukit Lanjan（N37）	Damansara Damai PJU 10	106/37/07	SMK Damansara Damai 1
Bukit Lanjan（N37）	Sri Damasara Jalan SD 10	106/37/08	SMK Bandar Sri Damansara (2)
Bukit Lanjan（N37）	Sri Damansara Jalan SD 12	106/37/09	SK Bandar Sri Damansara (2)
Bukit Lanjan（N37）	Saujana Damansara PJU 10	106/37/10	SK Damansara Damai 1
Bukit Lanjan（N37）	Taman Ehsan Jalan 5	106/37/11	SK Taman Ehsan
Bukit Lanjan（N37）	Taman Ehsan Jalan 2	106/37/12	SMK Taman Ehsan
Bukit Lanjan（N37）	Desa Aman Puri	106/37/13	SK Desa Amanpuri
Bukit Lanjan（N37）	Taman Ehsan Jalan 4	106/37/14	SRA Taman Ehsan Kepong
Bukit Lanjan（N37）	Sungai Buloh	106/37/15	SJK (T) Saraswathy
Bukit Lanjan（N37）	Selayang Utama	106/37/16	SK Selayang Utama
Bukit Lanjan（N37）	Kepong Utama	106/37/17	SK Kepong, FRIM
Bukit Lanjan（N37）	Selayang Jaya	106/37/18	SK Selayang Jaya
Bukit Lanjan（N37）	Taman Daya	106/37/19	SMK Kepong
Bukit Lanjan（N37）	Taman Indah Perdana	106/37/20	Ruang Masyarakat Tingkat Bawah Rumah Pangsa Blok E Taman Indah Perdana
Bukit Lanjan（N37）	Taman Bidara	106/37/21	Dewan Seberguna Taman Bidara

=== Representation history ===
Members of the Legislative Assembly for Bukit Lanjan
Assembly	No	Years	Member	Party
Constituency created from Damansara Utama, Subang and Paya Jaras
9th	N32	1995–1999	Pius Martin	BN (GERAKAN)
10th	N32	1999–2004	Lum Weng Keong (劉永強)	BN (GERAKAN)
11th	N37	2004–2008	Yong Dai Ying (楊帶英)	BN (GERAKAN)
12th	N37	2008–2013	Elizabeth Wong Keat Ping (黃潔冰)	PR (PKR)
13th	N37	2013–2015	Elizabeth Wong Keat Ping (黃潔冰)	PR (PKR)
13th	N37	2015–2018	Elizabeth Wong Keat Ping (黃潔冰)	PH (PKR)
14th	N37	2018–2023	Elizabeth Wong Keat Ping (黃潔冰)	PH (PKR)
15th	N37	2023–present	Pua Pei Ling (潘佩玲)	PH (PKR)

== Election results ==
Selangor state election, 2023
Party	Candidate	Votes	%	∆%
PH	Pua Pei Ling	57,051	78.28	▼8.12
PN	Muniraa Abu Bakar	15,824	21.72	▲21.72
Total valid votes		72,875	100.00	
Total rejected ballots		255		
Unreturned ballots		102		
Turnout		73,232	66.25	▼20.54
Registered electors		110,538		
Majority		41,227	56.56	▼16.24
PH hold		Swing		

Selangor state election, 2018
Party	Candidate	Votes	%	∆%
PKR	Elizabeth Wong Keat Ping	47,748	86.40	▲11.41
BN	Syed Abdul Razak Syed Long Alsagoff	7,515	13.60	▼11.41
Total valid votes		55,263	100.00	
Total rejected ballots		296		
Unreturned ballots		173		
Turnout		55,732	86.79	▼0.32
Registered electors		64,217		
Majority		40,233	72.80	▲22.82
PKR hold		Swing		

Selangor state election, 2013
Party	Candidate	Votes	%	∆%
PKR	Elizabeth Wong Keat Ping	25,808	74.99	▲11.49
BN	Chong Tuck Chiew	8,608	25.01	▼11.49
Total valid votes		34,416	100.00	
Total rejected ballots		336		
Unreturned ballots		72		
Turnout		34,824	87.11	▲11.10
Registered electors		39,978		
Majority		17,200	49.98	▲22.98
PKR hold		Swing		
Source(s) "Federal Government Gazette - Notice of Contested Election, State Legislative Assembly for the State of Selangor [P.U. (B) 192/2013]" (PDF). Attorney General's Chambers of Malaysia. 26 April 2013. Archived from the original (PDF) on 29 December 2019. "Federal Government Gazette - Results of Contested Election and Statements of the Poll after the Official Addition of Votes, State Constituencies for the State of Selangor [P.U. (B) 233/2013]" (PDF). Attorney General's Chambers of Malaysia. 22 May 2013. Archived from the original (PDF) on 2 October 2018.

Selangor state election, 2008
Party	Candidate	Votes	%	∆%
PKR	Elizabeth Wong Keat Ping	12,125	63.50	▲42.10
BN	Yong Dai Ying	6,970	36.50	▼42.10
Total valid votes		19,095	100.00	
Total rejected ballots		299		
Unreturned ballots		26		
Turnout		19,420	76.01	▲1.86
Registered electors		25,550		
Majority		5,155	27.00	▼30.20
PKR gain from BN		Swing		?

Selangor state election, 2004
Party	Candidate	Votes	%	∆%
BN	Yong Dai Ying	11,460	78.60	▲21.22
PKR	Panneerselvam Varathan	3,121	21.40	▼21.40
Total valid votes		14,581	100.00	
Total rejected ballots		314		
Unreturned ballots		12		
Turnout		14,907	74.15	▼1.41
Registered electors		20,104		
Majority		8,339	57.20	▲42.44
BN hold		Swing		

Selangor state election, 1999
Party	Candidate	Votes	%	∆%
BN	Lum Weng Keong	11,082	57.38	▼8.91
DAP	Saw Cheong Teng	8,230	42.62	▲20.41
Total valid votes		19,312	100.00	
Total rejected ballots		651		
Unreturned ballots		1,231		
Turnout		21,194	75.56	▲0.59
Registered electors		28,050		
Majority		2,852	14.76	▼29.32
BN hold		Swing		

Selangor state election, 1995
Party	Candidate	Votes	%
BN	Pius Martin S Martin	9,511	66.29
DAP	Chang Chan Man	3,187	22.21
PAS	Ariffin Shafie	1,650	11.50
Total valid votes		14,348	100.00
Total rejected ballots		776	
Unreturned ballots		907	
Turnout		16,031	74.97
Registered electors		21,384	
Majority		6,324	44.08
This was a new constituency created.
