= Banting (state constituency) =

Banting (N52)
Selangor constituency

State constituency
- Legislature: Selangor State Legislative Assembly
MLA
Papparaidu Veraman
PH
- Constituency created: 1974
- First contested: 1974
- Last contested: 2023

Demographics
- Electors (2023): 44,972

Banting is a state constituency in Selangor, Malaysia, that has been represented in the Selangor State Legislative Assembly from 1974 to 1995 and since 2018. It has been represented by Papparaidu Veraman of Pakatan Harapan (PH) since 2023.

The state constituency was created in the 1974 redistribution and was mandated to return a single member to the Selangor State Legislative Assembly under the first past the post voting system.

== Demographics ==
Ethnic breakdown of Banting's electorate as of 2023
1. Chinese (57.4%)
2. Indian (22.5%)
3. Malay (18.1%)
4. Other ethnicities (2.07%)

== History ==
It was abolished in 1995 when it was redistributed.

Teluk Datuk was renamed as Banting following the redelineation exercise in 2018. Banting is currently represented in the Selangor State Legislative Assembly.

=== Polling districts ===
According to the federal gazette issued on 30 March 2018, the Banting constituency is divided into 13 polling districts.

State constituency	Polling Districts	Code	Location
Banting (N52）	Jenjarom Tempatan Kedua	112/52/01	SJK (C) Jenjarom
Banting (N52）	Jenjarom Tempatan Ketiga	112/52/02	SJK (C) Jenjarom
Banting (N52）	Jenjarom Tempatan Keempat	112/52/03	SJK (C) Jenjarom
Banting (N52）	Kota Sri Langat	112/52/04	SJK (T) Sungai Sedu Banting
Banting (N52）	Sungai Manggis Utara	112/52/05	SMK Sungai Manggis
Banting (N52）	Sungai Manggis Selatan	112/52/06	SJK (T) Sungai Manggis
Banting (N52）	Telok Datok	112/52/07	SMJK Methodist Telok Datok Banting
Banting (N52）	Telok Bunut	112/52/08	SJK (C) Kah Wah Telok Bunut
Banting (N52）	Jenjarom	112/52/09	SJK (T) Jenjarom
Banting (N52）	Jenjarom Tempatan Pertama	112/52/10	SJK (T) Jenjarom
Banting (N52）	Banting Jaya	112/52/11	SK Sri Langat
Banting (N52）	Pulau Banting	112/52/12	Dewan Seberguna Kampung Org. Asli P. Banting
Banting (N52）	Pekan Banting	112/52/13	SJK (C) Choong Hua Banting

=== Representation history ===
Members of the Legislative Assembly for Banting
Assembly	No	Years	Member	Party
Constituency created from Telok Datoh and Morib
4th	N29	1974–1978	Hormat Rafei	BN (UMNO)
5th	N29	1978–1982	Hormat Rafei	BN (UMNO)
6th	N29	1982–1986	Fatimah Suhaimi	BN (UMNO)
7th	N39	1986–1990	Fatimah Suhaimi	BN (UMNO)
8th	N39	1990–1995	Fatimah Suhaimi	BN (UMNO)
Constituency abolished, split into Dengkil, Batu Laut and Teluk Datuk
Constituency re-created from Teluk Datuk, Morib and Sijangkang
14th	N52	2018–2023	Lau Weng San (刘永山)	PH (DAP)
15th	N52	2023–present	Papparaidu Veraman	PH (DAP)

== Election results ==
Selangor state election, 2023
Party	Candidate	Votes	%	∆%
PH	Papparaidu Veraman	27,223	80.58	▲80.58
PN	Saravanan Mutto Krishnan	5,121	15.16	▲15.16
Independent	Ang Wei Yang	1,439	4.26	▲4.26
Total valid votes		33,783	100.00	
Total rejected ballots		205		
Unreturned ballots		29		
Turnout		34,017	75.64	▼11.91
Registered electors		44,972		
Majority		22,102	65.42	▲0.64
PH hold		Swing		

Selangor state election, 2018
Party	Candidate	Votes	%	∆%
PKR	Lau Weng San	21,846	81.81	▲81.81
BN	Ng Siok Hwa	4,547	17.03	▼50.12
Parti Rakyat Malaysia	Philip Tan Choon Swee	311	1.16	▲1.16
Total valid votes		26,704	100.00	
Total rejected ballots		386		
Unreturned ballots		55		
Turnout		27,145	87.55	
Registered electors		31,006		
Majority		17,299	64.78	
PKR gain from BN		Swing		?

Selangor state election, 1990
Party	Candidate	Votes	%	∆%
BN	Fatimah Suhaimi	9,264	67.15	▼7.42
PAS	Mohd Mesari Jasman	4,532	32.85	▲7.42
Total valid votes		13,796	100.00	
Total rejected ballots		690		
Unreturned ballots				
Turnout		14,486	78.60	▲3.95
Registered electors		18,430		
Majority		4,732	34.30	▼15.04
BN hold		Swing		

Selangor state election, 1986
Party	Candidate	Votes	%	∆%
BN	Fatimah Suhaimi	8,258	74.67	▲8.08
PAS	Rasman Suleiman	2,801	25.33	▲8.33
Total valid votes		11,059	100.00	
Total rejected ballots		447		
Unreturned ballots				
Turnout		11,506	74.65	▼4.71
Registered electors		15,413		
Majority		5,457	49.34	▼0.25
BN hold		Swing		

Selangor state election, 1982
Party	Candidate	Votes	%	∆%
BN	Fatimah Suhaimi	6,943	66.59	▼3.58
PAS	Basir Salleh	1,773	17.00	▼12.83
Independent	Ang Poi Chai	1,711	16.41	▲16.41
Total valid votes		10,427	100.00	
Total rejected ballots		342		
Unreturned ballots		0		
Turnout		10,769	79.36	
Registered electors		13,570		
Majority		5,170	49.59	▲9.25
BN hold		Swing		

Selangor state election, 1978
Party	Candidate	Votes	%
BN	Hormat Rafei	5,852	70.17
PAS	Basir Salleh	2,488	29.83
Total valid votes		8,340	100.00
Total rejected ballots		547	
Unreturned ballots		0	
Turnout		8,887	78.91
Registered electors		11,262	
Majority		3,364	40.34
BN hold		Swing	

Selangor state election, 1974
Party	Candidate	Votes	%
On the nomination day, Hormat Rafei won uncontested.
BN	Hormat Rafei		
Total valid votes			100.00
Total rejected ballots			
Unreturned ballots			
Turnout			
Registered electors		8,814	
Majority			
This was a new constituency created.
