= Elizabeth Wong Keat Ping =

Malaysian politician

- 黄洁冰

Member of the Selangor State Executive Council
- In office 27 September 2014 – 13 May 2018
- Monarch: Sharafuddin
- Menteri Besar: Mohamed Azmin Ali
- Portfolio: Tourism, Environment, Green Technology and Consumer Affairs
- Preceded by: Herself (Tourism, Consumer Affairs and Environment); Portfolio established (Green Technology)
- Succeeded by: Abdul Rashid Asari (Tourism); Hee Loy Sian (Environment, Green Technology and Consumer Affairs)
- Constituency: Bukit Lanjan
- In office 25 March 2008 – 26 September 2014
- Monarch: Sharafuddin
- Menteri Besar: Khalid Ibrahim
- Portfolio: Tourism, Consumer Affairs and Environment
- Preceded by: Lim Thuang Seng (Tourism and Consumer Affairs); Ch'ng Toh Eng (Environment)
- Succeeded by: Herself
- Constituency: Bukit Lanjan

Member of the Selangor State Legislative Assembly for Bukit Lanjan
- In office 8 March 2008 – 12 August 2023
- Preceded by: Yong Dai Ying (BN–Gerakan)
- Succeeded by: Pua Pei Ling (PH–PKR)
- Majority: 5,155 (2008); 17,200 (2013); 40,233 (2018)

Personal details
- Born: Elizabeth Wong Keat Ping; 9 March 1970 (age 56) Ipoh, Perak, Malaysia
- Citizenship: Malaysian
- Party: People's Justice Party (PKR)
- Other political affiliations: Pakatan Rakyat (PR) (2008–2015); Pakatan Harapan (PH) (since 2015)
- Occupation: Politician, activist
- Website: elizabethwong.wordpress.com
- Elizabeth Wong Keat Ping on Facebook

Elizabeth Wong Keat Ping

Chinese name
- Traditional Chinese: 黃潔冰
- Simplified Chinese: 黄洁冰
- Hanyu Pinyin: Huáng Jié Bīng
- Pha̍k-fa-sṳ: Vòng Ke̍t-pên
- Jyutping: Wong4 Git3 Bing1
- Hokkien POJ: N̂g Kiat-peng
- Tâi-lô: N̂g Kiat-ping

Wong Keat Ping (Note: Simplified Chinese: 黄洁冰; traditional Chinese: 黃潔冰; pinyin: Huáng Jié Bīng; Jyutping: Wong4 Git3 Bing1; Pe̍h-ōe-jī: N̂g Kiat-peng; Pha̍k-fa-sṳ: Vòng Ke̍t-pên) (born 9 March 1970), known professionally as Elizabeth Wong, is a Malaysian politician and activist who served as Member of the Selangor State Executive Council (EXCO) in the Pakatan Rakyat (PR) and Pakatan Harapan (PH) state administrations under former Menteris Besar Khalid Ibrahim and Azmin Ali from March 2008 to May 2018 as well as Member of the Selangor State Legislative Assembly (MLA) for Bukit Lanjan from March 2008 to August 2023. She is a member of the People's Justice Party (PKR), a component party of the PH and formerly coalition.

Wong is also a human rights activist and was involved in activist environmental campaigns.

Wong entered the electoral arena as a PKR candidate during the 12th general election. On 8 March 2008, Wong defeated the incumbent and was elected as the new Selangor State Assemblywoman for Bukit Lanjan with a majority of over 5000 votes.

After serving 15 years, Wong did not defend her seat in the 2023 Selangor state election and was replaced by party colleague Phua Pei Ling.

== Election results ==
Selangor State Legislative Assembly
Year	Constituency	Candidate	Votes	Pct	Opponent(s)	Votes	Pct	Ballots cast	Majority	Turnout
2008	N37 Bukit Lanjan	Elizabeth Wong Keat Ping (PKR)	12,125	62.44%	Yong Dai Ying (Gerakan)	6,970	35.89%	19,420	5,155	76.01%
2013	N37 Bukit Lanjan	Elizabeth Wong Keat Ping (PKR)	25,808	74.99%	Chong Tuck Chiew (Gerakan)	6,608	25.01%	34,416	17,200	86.90%
2018	N37 Bukit Lanjan	Elizabeth Wong Keat Ping (PKR)	47,748	86.40%	Syed Abd Razak Syed Long Alsagoff (Gerakan)	7,515	13.60%	55,732	40,223	86.78%
