= People's Alternative Party =

Political party of Malaysia

- Malay name: Parti Alternatif Rakyat
- Abbreviation: PAP
- President: A. David Dass
- Founder: Zulkifli Mohd Noor
- Founded: 30 October 2015
- Split from: Democratic Action Party (DAP)
- Headquarters: Penang
- Ideology: Centrism; Liberal democracy
- National affiliation: Gagasan Sejahtera (Strategic partner)
- Colours: White, blue
- Dewan Negara: 0 / 70
- Dewan Rakyat: 0 / 222
- Dewan Undangan Negeri: 0 / 587

The People's Alternative Party or in Malay Parti Alternatif Rakyat (abbrev: PAP) is a political party in Malaysia formed by a group of former Democratic Action Party (DAP) leaders and members led by former DAP vice-chairman Zulkifli Mohd Noor.

The PAP is based in Penang and intends to provide Malaysians with an alternative to Barisan Nasional and Pakatan Harapan. The Registrar of Societies (RoS) approved PAP's registration as a political party on 30 October 2015.

On 27 February 2018, founder Zulkifli Mohd Noor resigned and left the party, along with nine other central executive committee members after A. David Dass hijacked the party and become president, formed a new central executive committee and brought in mostly ethnic Indian members to fill the vacated posts. In the 2018 Malaysian general election (GE14), PAP partnered with the PAS-led Gagasan Sejahtera but failed in their maiden election with all their candidates having lost their deposits.

== General election result ==
Election	Total seats won	Seats contested	Total votes	Voting Percentage	Outcome of election	Election leader
2018	0 / 222	1	302	0.00%	0 seat; No representation in Parliament (Gagasan Sejahtera)	A. David Dass

=== State elections ===
State assembly	Election	Votes	%	Seats	Won/contested	+/–	Position (Note: As part of electoral coalition.)	Status
Perlis	2022	Did not contest						No seats
Kedah	2023	Did not contest						No seats
Kelantan	2023	Did not contest						No seats
Terengganu	2023	Did not contest						No seats
Penang	2023	Did not contest						No seats
Perak	2022	Did not contest						No seats
Pahang	2022	Did not contest						No seats
Selangor	2023	Did not contest						No seats
Negeri Sembilan	2026	Did not contest						No seats
Malacca	2026	Did not contest						No seats
Johor	2026	Did not contest						No seats
Sabah	2025	Did not contest						No seats
Sarawak	2021	Did not contest						No seats

Note

State election	State Legislative Assembly			
State election	Penang	Selangor	Negeri Sembilan	Total won / Total contested
2/3 majority	2 / 3	2 / 3	2 / 3	
2018	0 / 40	0 / 56	0 / 36	0 / 9

== See also ==
- Politics of Malaysia
- List of political parties in Malaysia
