= Teluk Datuk (state constituency) =

Selangor constituency

Defunct state constituency
- Legislature: Selangor State Legislative Assembly
- Constituency created: 1958
- Constituency abolished: 2018
- First contested: 1959
- Last contested: 2013

Teluk Datuk was a state constituency in Selangor, Malaysia, that has been represented in the Selangor State Legislative Assembly from 1959 to 1974, from 1995 to 2018. Following the 2018 redelineation, Teluk Datuk has been renamed Banting .

The state constituency was created in the 1958 redistribution and is mandated to return a single member to the Selangor State Legislative Assembly under the first past the post voting system.

== History ==
State Constitiency	Area					
State Constitiency	1959 (as Telok Datoh)	1974	1984	1994	2003	2018
Teluk Datuk	Jenjarom; Labohan Dagang; Sijangkang; Telok Datok; Telok Panglima Garang			Banting; Jenjarom; Kampung Seri Cheeding; Taman Bakti; Telok Datok	Bandar Rimbayu; Bandar Saujana Putra; Kampung Seri Cheeding; Taman Seri Jaromas; Telok Datok	

It was abolished in 1974 when it was redistributed. It was re-created in 1994.

2004–2016: The constituency contains the polling districts of Bukit Kemandul, Seri Cheeding, Kampung Jenjarum, Jenjarum Tempatan Kedua, Jenjarum Tempatan Ketiga, Jenjarum Tempatan Keempat, Kota Seri Langat, Sungai Manggis Utara, Sungai Manggis Selatan, Teluk Datuk, Teluk Bunut, Bukit Cheeding (A).

2016–2018: The constituency contains the polling districts of Bukit Kemandul, Seri Cheeding, Kampung Jenjarum, Jenjarum Tempatan Kedua, Jenjarum Tempatan Ketiga, Jenjarum Tempatan Keempat, Kota Sri Langat, Sungai Manggis Utara, Sungai Manggis Selatan, Teluk Datuk, Teluk Bunut, Bukit Cheeding (A), Bandar Saujana Putra.

=== Representation history ===
Members of the Legislative Assembly for Teluk Datuk
Assembly	No	Years	Member	Party
Constituency created
Telok Datoh
1st	N21	1959-1963	Raja Ismail Raja Ibrahim	Alliance (UMNO)
1st	N21	1963-1964	Hormat Rafei	Alliance (UMNO)
2nd	N21	1964-1969	Hormat Rafei	Alliance (UMNO)
		1969-1971	Assembly dissolved	
3rd	N21	1971-1973	Hormat Rafei	Alliance (UMNO)
3rd	N21	1973-1974	Hormat Rafei	BN (UMNO)
Constituency abolished, split into Banting and Panglima Garang
Constituency re-created from Banting and Panglima Garang
Teluk Datuk
9th	N44	1995-1999	Ei Kim Hock (余金福)	BN (MCA)
10th	N44	1999-2004	Ei Kim Hock (余金福)	BN (MCA)
11th	N52	2004-2008	Ei Kim Hock (余金福)	BN (MCA)
12th	N52	2008-2013	Philip Tan Choon Swee (陳春水)	PR (DAP)
13th	N52	2013-2016	Loh Chee Heng (羅志興)	PR (DAP)
13th	N52	2016-2018	Loh Chee Heng (羅志興)	IND
Constituency renamed to Banting

== Election results ==
Selangor state election, 2013
Party	Candidate	Votes	%	∆%
DAP	Loh Chee Heng	13,155	61.81	▲9.60
BN	Jimmy Tan Cheng Chai	7,764	36.48	▼11.31
Independent	Hamzah Abu Bakar	364	1.71	▲1.71
Total valid votes		21,283	100.00	
Total rejected ballots		384		
Unreturned ballots		32		
Turnout		21,699	89.15	▲7.25
Registered electors		24,340		
Majority		5,391	25.33	▲20.90
DAP hold		Swing		
Source(s) "Federal Government Gazette - Notice of Contested Election, State Legislative Assembly for the State of Selangor [P.U. (B) 192/2013]" (PDF). Attorney General's Chambers of Malaysia. 26 April 2013. Archived from the original (PDF) on 2019-12-29. "Federal Government Gazette - Results of Contested Election and Statements of the Poll after the Official Addition of Votes, State Constituencies for the State of Selangor [P.U. (B) 233/2013]". Attorney General's Chambers of Malaysia. 22 May 2013. Archived from the original (PDF) on 2018-10-02.

Selangor state election, 2008
Party	Candidate	Votes	%	∆%
DAP	Philip Tan Choon Swee	7,524	52.21	▲20.12
BN	Ei Kim Hock	6,886	47.79	▼20.12
Total valid votes		14,410	100.00	
Total rejected ballots		493		
Unreturned ballots		9		
Turnout		14,912	81.90	▲3.79
Registered electors		18,207		
Majority		638	4.43	▼31.39
DAP gain from BN		Swing		?

Selangor state election, 2004
Party	Candidate	Votes	%	∆%
BN	Ei Kim Hock	8,899	67.91	▲3.07
DAP	Ang Leng Kiat	4,205	32.09	▼3.07
Total valid votes		13,104	100.00	
Total rejected ballots		474		
Unreturned ballots		130		
Turnout		13,708	78.11	▼0.08
Registered electors		17,549		
Majority		4,694	35.82	▲6.14
BN hold		Swing		

Selangor state election, 1999
Party	Candidate	Votes	%	∆%
BN	Ei Kim Hock	9,305	64.84	▼1.23
DAP	Lim Soon Hong	5,046	35.16	▲7.93
Total valid votes		14,351	100.00	
Total rejected ballots		542		
Unreturned ballots		11		
Turnout		14,904	78.19	▲0.55
Registered electors		19,061		
Majority		4,259	29.68	▼9.16
BN hold		Swing		

Selangor state election, 1995
Party	Candidate	Votes	%	∆%
BN	Ei Kim Hock	8,591	66.07	
DAP	Chew Kim Swee	3,541	27.23	
Independent	Edgar Anthony Duraisingam	449	3.45	
Independent	Khanafi Arsad	422	3.25	
Total valid votes		13,003	100.00	
Total rejected ballots		498		
Unreturned ballots		2		
Turnout		13,503	77.64	▼1.04
Registered electors		17,392		
Majority		5,050	38.84	▲4.54
BN gain from Alliance		Swing		?

Selangor state election, 1969: Telok Datoh
Party	Candidate	Votes	%	∆%
Alliance	Hormat Rafei	4,730	62.61	
PMIP	Tanawi Dahalan	2,825	37.39	
Total valid votes		7,555	100.00	
Total rejected ballots		1,294		
Unreturned ballots		0		
Turnout		8,849	70.66	▼9.02
Registered electors		12,523		
Majority		1,905	25.22	▼11.82
Alliance hold		Swing		

Selangor state election, 1964: Telok Datoh
Party	Candidate	Votes	%	∆%
Alliance	Hormat Rafei	4,738	58.67	
PMIP	Tanawi Dahalan	1,747	21.63	
Socialist Front	Gan Kim Leng	1,591	19.70	
Total valid votes		8,076	100.00	
Total rejected ballots		630		
Unreturned ballots		0		
Turnout		8,706	79.68	▲6.24
Registered electors		10,926		
Majority		2,991	37.04	▲12.05
Alliance hold		Swing		

Selangor state by-election, 7 September 1963: Telok Datoh Upon the death of incumbent, Raja Ismail Raja Ibrahim
Party	Candidate	Votes	%	∆%
Alliance	Hormat Rafei	3,699	51.93	
Independent	Othman Abdullah	1,919	26.94	
PMIP	Ali Saleh	1,505	21.13	
Total valid votes		7,123	100.00	
Total rejected ballots		404		
Unreturned ballots		0		
Turnout		7,527	73.44	▼10.11
Registered electors		10,249		
Majority		1,780	24.99	▼7.04
Alliance hold		Swing		

Selangor state election, 1959: Telok Datoh
Party	Candidate	Votes	%	∆%
Alliance	Raja Ismail Raja Ibrahim	4,516	66.01	
PMIP	Ali Salleh	2,325	33.99	
Total valid votes		6,841	100.00	
Total rejected ballots		282		
Unreturned ballots		0		
Turnout		7,123	83.55	
Registered electors		8,525		
Majority		2,191	32.03	
This was a new constituency created.
