= Malaysia National Alliance Party =

- Malay name: Parti Ikatan Bangsa Malaysia ڤرتي ايكتن بڠسا مليسيا
- Chinese name: 馬來西亞國家聯盟黨 马来西亚国家联盟党; Mǎláixīyà guójiā liánméng dǎng
- Abbreviation: IKATAN
- President: Abdul Kadir Sheikh Fadzir
- Secretary-General: Tengku Ahmad Mudzaffar Bin Tengku Zaid
- Founded: 7 June 2012
- Legalised: 15 May 2015
- Dissolved: 9 March 2026
- Split from: United Malays National Organisation (UMNO)
- Succeeded by: United Malays National Organisation (UMNO)
- Headquarters: Kuala Lumpur, Malaysia
- Ideology: Islamic democracy Social justice
- Political position: Centre-left
- National affiliation: Friends of BN (since 2022) (Note: The party was part of Gagasan Sejahtera (2016–2020) and was allied with Perikatan Nasional (2020–2022))
- Colours: Red, white and black
- Slogan: Unity, Progress, Fairness, Happiness (English); Bersatu, Maju, Adil, Bahagia (Malay)
- Dewan Negara: 0 / 70
- Dewan Rakyat: 0 / 222
- Dewan Undangan Negeri: 0 / 587

Party flag

Website
- ikatan.org

The Parti Ikatan Bangsa Malaysia (English: Malaysia National Alliance Party; often known by its acronym: IKATAN) is a political party in Malaysia formed on 7 June 2012 by the former United Malays National Organisation (UMNO) cabinet minister and veteran, Abdul Kadir Sheikh Fadzir along with a few former UMNO members. The party was forced to wait for more than two years for approval from the Registrar of Societies (RoS). In February 2013, Abdul Kadir dragged the RoS to High Court for them to approve the party. The party was later approved on 15 May 2015.

The party intends to bring the original ideas and politics principles of Tunku Abdul Rahman, the first Malaysian Prime Minister and Father of Independence. The party said that they are not pro-government nor pro-opposition.

In 2016 IKATAN however together with opposition Pan-Malaysian Islamic Party (PAS) formed Gagasan Sejahtera (GS), an informal political Third Force alliance. Joined later by Pan-Malaysian Islamic Front (BERJASA), the three opposition parties under GS alliance contested using PAS logo in the 2018 general elections (GE14), including IKATAN in some 'unwinnable' non-Muslim seats. IKATAN failed to win a single state or parliamentary seat in the seats it had contested with only PAS managing to win seats in the election, securing 18. (Note: In the 2018 balloting, the party formed the Ideas of Prosperity (Gagasan Sejahtera - GS) coalition with the Malaysia National Alliance Party (Parti Ikatan Bangsa Malaysia - IKATAN) The PAS joined the 2020 PN coalition government.) The party is currently unrepresented in the Dewan Rakyat and in all of the state legislative assemblies.

On 26 October 2022, IKATAN chose to support BN. IKATAN's Head of Information, Nik Marhalim Mohd Bakri, said in the spirit of ummah unification, then IKATAN chose to support BN in GE-15.. On 2026, the party moved to merge back with UMNO.

== Structure and membership ==
=== Current office bearers ===
- President:
  - Abdul Kadir Sheikh Fadzir
- Deputy President:
  - Abdul Aziz Sheikh Fadzir
- Vice-President:
  - Tunku Muinuddin Putra
  - Mohamad Badri Abd Rahman
- Secretary-General:
  - Tengku Ahmad Mudzaffar Bin Tengku Zaid
- Treasurer:
  - David Sew Kah Heng
- Information Chief:
  - Nik Marhalim Dato' Mohd Bakri
- Strategy Director:
  - Azahari Ab Rahman
- Youth Chief:
  - Shahir Adnan
- Central Working Committee:
  - Kelly Lim
  - Janice Lim
  - Nik Marhalim
- Founding member
  - Dato Tony Looi

== General election results ==
Election	Total seats won	Seats contested	Total votes	Voting Percentage	Outcome of election	Election leader
2018	0 / 222	1	9,025	0.07	; No representation in Parliament (Gagasan Sejahtera)	Abdul Kadir Sheikh Fadzir

=== State election results ===
State assembly	Election	Votes	%	Seats	+/–	Position (Note: As part of electoral coalition.)	Status
Perlis	2022	Did not contest					No seats
Kedah	2023	Did not contest					No seats
Kelantan	2023	Did not contest					No seats
Terengganu	2023	Did not contest					No seats
Penang	2023	Did not contest					No seats
Perak	2022	Did not contest					No seats
Pahang	2022	Did not contest					No seats
Selangor	2023	Did not contest					No seats
Negeri Sembilan	2026	Did not contest					No seats
Malacca	2026	Did not contest					No seats
Johor	2026	Did not contest					No seats
Sabah	2025	Did not contest					No seats
Sarawak	2021	Did not contest					No seats

Note

State election	State Legislative Assembly	
State election	Selangor	Total won / Total contested
2/3 majority	2 / 3	
2018	0 / 56	0 / 3

== See also ==
- List of political parties in Malaysia
- Politics of Malaysia
- Gagasan Sejahtera
- 2018 Malaysian general election
