= Gagasan Sejahtera =

- English name: Ideas of Prosperity
- Abbreviation: GS/GAGASAN
- Leadership: Abdul Hadi Awang; Abdul Kadir Sheikh Fadzir; Abdul Kadir Mamat
- Secretary-General: Takiyuddin Hassan
- Founded: 16 March 2016
- Dissolved: 2020
- Preceded by: Pakatan Rakyat
- Succeeded by: Perikatan Nasional; Gerakan Tanah Air
- Headquarters: Kuala Lumpur, Malaysia (PAS & IKATAN); Pasir Mas, Malaysia (BERJASA)
- Newspaper: Harakah; 1Media.my
- Youth wing: Pemuda Gagasan Sejahtera
- Ideology: Majority: Islamism; Factions: Islamic democracy Social democracy
- Political position: Far-right
- Colours: Green and white
- Slogan: Sejahtera Bersama Islam; Malaysia Sejahtera
- Senate: 4 / 70
- House of Representatives: 18 / 222
- State Legislative Assemblies: 91 / 593

Election symbol

Website
- gagasansejahtera.my

The Gagasan Sejahtera (English: Ideas of Prosperity, abbrev: GS) was a coalition of opposition Islamist political parties which promote the "ideas of peace" in Malaysia. The informal electoral pact was formed initially on 16 March 2016 by Pan-Malaysian Islamic Party (PAS) and Parti Ikatan Bangsa Malaysia (IKATAN) as a Third Force to face both ruling Barisan Nasional (BN) and the opposition Pakatan Harapan (PH) coalitions in the upcoming 2018 Malaysian general election (GE14). It had announced on 13 August 2016 the pact to be formally called Gagasan Sejahtera. Pan-Malaysian Islamic Front (BERJASA) had later joined the coalition on 23 September 2016. The formation of the alliance brought criticism from both the main coalitions of BN and PH.

Gagasan Sejahtera is also considered a successor to the dissolved opposition Pakatan Rakyat (PR) coalition which PAS had been a part of it formerly and PH being the other one new coalition which PAS decided not joining. The main campaign of the alliance focuses mainly on PAS political agenda and uniting Malay Muslims matters, while upholding democracy as the best way to govern the country.

In May 2018, the Gagasan Sejahtera pact of the three opposition parties led by PAS as the core mover, along with minor parties IKATAN and BERJASA finally contested using the PAS logo the GE14, but only PAS won seats in the election, securing 18. (Note: In the 2018 balloting, the party formed the Ideas of Prosperity (Gagasan Sejahtera - GS) coalition with the Malaysia National Alliance Party (Parti Ikatan Bangsa Malaysia - IKATAN) The Pas joined the 2020 coalition government.) IKATAN was allotted to field candidates in five non-Muslim seats in Selangor, while BERJASA was given 'unwinnable' seats. Both parties failed to win any of the seats, with all of their candidates losing their deposits. BERJASA for the reason had left tacitly the alliance to contest 2019 Tanjung Piai by-election on its own ticket as PAS and GS supported BN instead of BERJASA recontesting by its president as candidate.

The alliance's strategic partners Love Malaysia Party (PCM) and People's Alternative Party (PAP), also failed in chosen non-Muslim seats in Penang. The yet to be registered Parti Harapan Malaysia (PHM) was another strategic partner but did not contest.

The alliance became inactive after PAS aligned itself with former rival United Malays National Organisation (UMNO) to set-up Muafakat Nasional (MN) while affiliating along with UMNO's offshoot the Malaysian United Indigenous Party (BERSATU). PAS further distanced itself from the alliance by joining Perikatan Nasional (PN), the new ruling coalition, during the chaotic events of the 2020–2022 political crisis during the 14th Malaysian Parliament term.

== Member parties and strategic partners ==
Flag	Name		Ideology	Leader(s)	Seats contested	2018 result		Current seats
Flag	Name		Ideology	Leader(s)	Seats contested	Votes (%)	Seats	Composition
Member parties
	PAS	Malaysian Islamic Party; Parti Islam Malaysia	Islamism	Abdul Hadi Awang	155	16.642%	18 / 222	18 / 18
	IKATAN	Malaysia National Alliance Party; Parti Ikatan Bangsa Malaysia	Social democracy	Abdul Kadir Sheikh Fadzir	1	0.45%	0 / 222	0 / 18
	BERJASA	Pan-Malaysian Islamic Front; Barisan Jemaah Islamiah Se-Malaysia	Islamic democracy	Zamani bin Ibrahim	3	0.177%	0 / 222	0 / 18
Strategic partners
—N/a	PCM	Love Malaysia Party; Parti Cinta Malaysia	Regionalism	Huan Cheng Guan	1	0.00%	0 / 222	0 / 18
—N/a	PAP	People's Alternative Party; Parti Alternatif Rakyat	Centrism	A. David Dass	1	0.00%	0 / 222	0 / 18
—N/a	PHRM	Malaysia Hope Party; Parti Harapan Rakyat Malaysia	Regionalism	Johari Musa	Did not contest			

== Elected representatives ==
=== Dewan Negara (Senate) ===
==== Senators ====
- Kelantan State Legislative Assembly:
  - Asmak Husin
  - Muhamad Mustafa
- Terengganu State Legislative Assembly:
  - Husain Awang
  - Nuridah Mohd Salleh

=== House of Representatives ===
==== Members of Parliament of the 14th Malaysian Parliament ====
Gagasan Sejahtera has 18 members of the House of Representatives, with all of them from PAS.

State	No.	Parliament Constituency	Member	Party
Kedah	P011	Pendang	Awang Solahudin Hashim	PAS
Kedah	P012	Jerai	Sabri Azit	PAS
Kedah	P013	Sik	Ahmad Tarmizi Sulaiman	PAS
Kelantan	P019	Tumpat	Che Abdullah Mat Nawi	PAS
Kelantan	P020	Pengkalan Chepa	Ahmad Marzuk Shaary	PAS
Kelantan	P021	Kota Bharu	Takiyuddin Hassan	PAS
Kelantan	P022	Pasir Mas	Ahmad Fadhli Shaari	PAS
Kelantan	P023	Rantau Panjang	Siti Zailah Mohd Yusoff	PAS
Kelantan	P024	Kubang Kerian	Tuan Ibrahim Tuan Man	PAS
Kelantan	P025	Bachok	Nik Mohamed Abduh Nik Abdul Aziz	PAS
Kelantan	P028	Pasir Puteh	Nik Muhammad Zawawi Salleh	PAS
Kelantan	P031	Kuala Krai	Abdul Latiff Abdul Rahman	PAS
Terengganu	P034	Setiu	Shaharizukirnain Abd. Kadir	PAS
Terengganu	P035	Kuala Nerus	Mohd. Khairuddin Aman Razali	PAS
Terengganu	P036	Kuala Terengganu	Ahmad Amzad Mohamed Hashim	PAS
Terengganu	P037	Marang	Abdul Hadi Awang	PAS
Terengganu	P039	Dungun	Wan Hassan Mohd. Ramli	PAS
Terengganu	P040	Kemaman	Che Alias Hamid	PAS
Total	Kedah (3), Kelantan (9), Terengganu (6)			

=== Dewan Undangan Negeri (State Legislative Assembly) ===
Gagasan Sejahtera has 91 members of the State Legislative Assembly, with all of them from PAS. It has representatives in every assembly other than those of Negeri Sembilan, Malacca, Sabah and Sarawak. The coalition holds a majority in the Kelantan and Terengganu State Legislative Assemblies, and supplies all the members of the state's Executive Council (a body akin to a Cabinet), led by Menteri Besar, Ahmad Yakob.

Kelantan State Legislative Assembly
37 / 45
Terengganu State Legislative Assembly
23 / 33
Kedah State Legislative Assembly
15 / 36
Pahang State Legislative Assembly
8 / 42
Perlis State Legislative Assembly
2 / 15
Perak State Legislative Assembly
3 / 59
Penang State Legislative Assembly
1 / 40
Selangor State Legislative Assembly
1 / 56
Johor State Legislative Assembly
1 / 56
Malacca State Legislative Assembly
0 / 28
Negeri Sembilan State Legislative Assembly
0 / 36
Sabah State Legislative Assembly
0 / 65
Sarawak State Legislative Assembly
0 / 82

== Government offices ==
=== State governments ===
During GS' existence PAS governed the states of Kelantan and Terengganu.

- Kelantan (2016–2020)
- Terengganu (2018–2020)
- Pahang (2019–2020)

Note: bold as Menteri Besar/Chief Minister, italic as junior partner
