= Selangor State Executive Council =

Executive branch of State Government of Selangor, Malaysia

- 2023-present
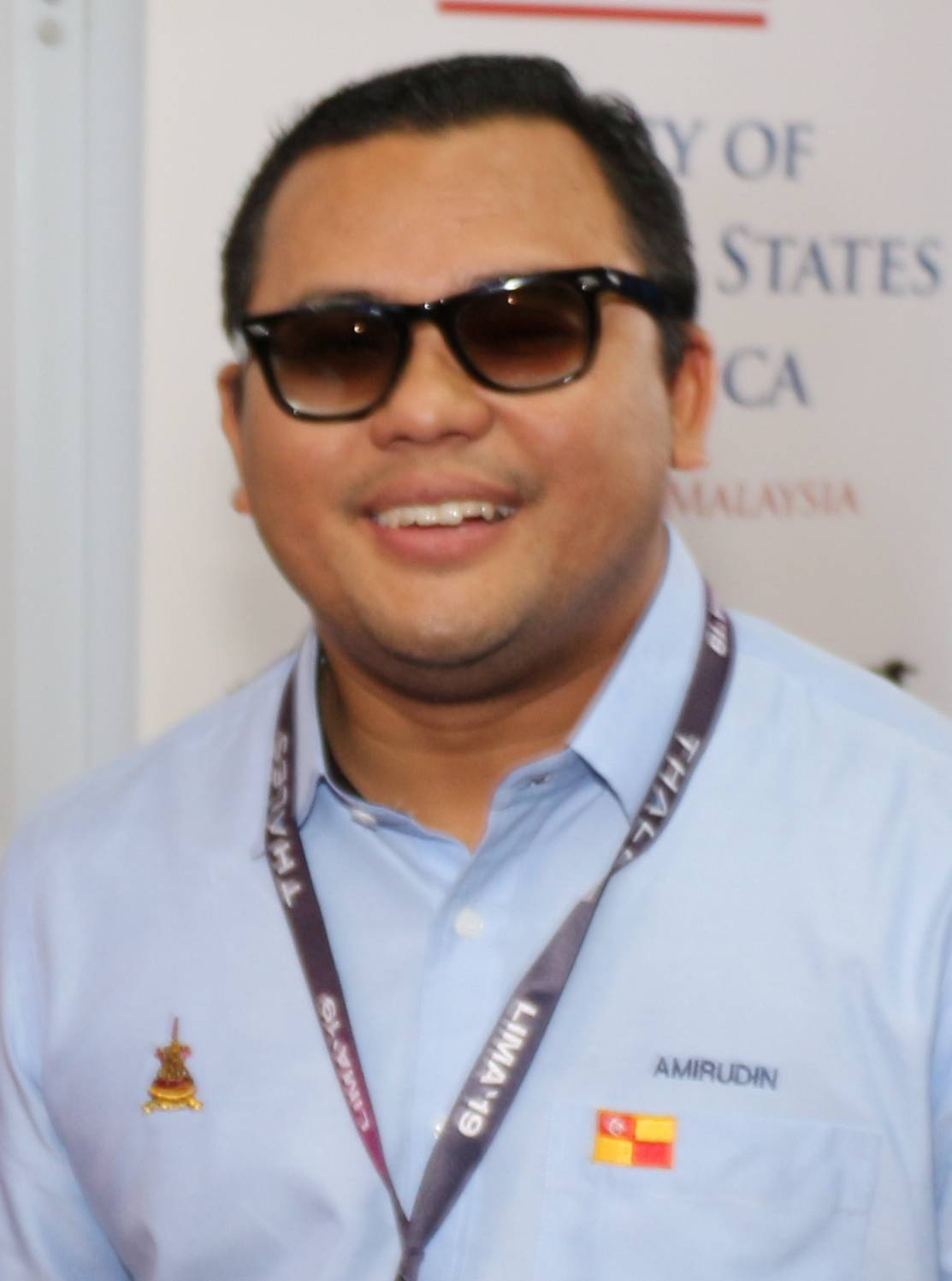
- Date formed: 21 August 2023

People and organisations
- Head of state: Sharafuddin
- Menteri Besar: Amirudin Shari (PH–PKR)
- Total no. of members: 11
- Member parties: Pakatan Harapan (PH): People's Justice Party (PKR); Democratic Action Party (DAP); National Trust Party (AMANAH); Barisan Nasional (BN): United Malays National Organisation (UMNO)
- Status in legislature: Majority government 34 / 56
- Opposition parties: Perikatan Nasional (PN); Malaysian United Indigenous Party (BERSATU); Malaysian Islamic Party (PAS)
- Opposition leader: Azmin Ali (PN–BERSATU)

History
- Election: 2023 Selangor state election
- Legislature term: 15th

The Selangor State Executive Council (Malay: Majlis Mesyuarat Kerajaan Negeri Selangor; abbrev: EXCO/MMKN) forms the executive branch of the state government of Selangor, Malaysia. It comprises the Menteri Besar, appointed by the Sultan on the basis that he is likely to command the confidence of the majority of members of the Selangor State Legislative Assembly, and a minimum of four up to a maximum of ten members of the State Assembly. Additionally, the State Secretary, State Legal Adviser and State Financial Officer, who are civil servants that serve as ex officio members.

It is similar in structure and role to the Cabinet of Malaysia, while being smaller in size. As federal and state responsibilities vary, there are a number of portfolios that differ between the federal and state governments.

Members are appointed by the Sultan on the advice of the Menteri Besar. The council has a number of committees; each committees will be chaired by the respective members, will take care of certain state affairs, activities, state government departments and agencies. Members of the council are always the chair of a committee.

== Current composition ==
All members were sworn in on 21 August 2023 following the 2023 Selangor state election on 12 August, while portfolios were announced on 23 August 2023. The appointment of Rizam Ismail marks the first time in 15 years that Barisan Nasional was a part of the Selangor State Government since their defeat in the 2008 Selangor state election to the then Pakatan Rakyat coalition.

=== Amirudin II EXCO (August 2023 – present) ===
PH (10)	BN (1)
PKR (4); DAP (4); AMANAH (2)	UMNO (1)

Member	Portfolio (Note: Assumed portfolios 2 days after taking office.)	Party	Constituency	Term start	Term end
Dato' Seri Amirudin Shari (Menteri Besar)	Land & Natural Resource Development; Finance & Economic Action; Administrative Modernisation & Government Digitalisation; Strategic Communication; Education & Human Capital Development	PH (PKR)	Sungai Tua	21 August 2023	Incumbent
Datuk Borhan Aman Shah	Housing & Sustainable Urban Development; Culture, Malay Customs & Heritage	PH (PKR)	Tanjong Sepat	21 August 2023	Incumbent
Mohd Najwan Halimi	Youth & Sports Development; Entrepreneur & Creative Economy Empowerment; Disaster Management	PH (PKR)	Kota Anggerik	21 August 2023	Incumbent
Dr. Mohammad Fahmi Ngah	Islamic Affairs; Halal Industry; Science, Technology & Innovation Inculturation; Digital Infrastructure	PH (PKR)	Seri Setia	21 August 2023	Incumbent
Ng Sze Han	Investment & Trade; SME & New Economic Region Development; Selangor Mobility	PH (DAP)	Kinrara	21 August 2023	Incumbent
Dato' Ng Suee Lim	Local Government Development; Tourism; New Village Development	PH (DAP)	Sekinchan	21 August 2023	Incumbent
Jamaliah Jamaluddin	Public Health; Environment; Climate Change; Green Technology	PH (DAP)	Bandar Utama	21 August 2023	Incumbent
Papparaidu Veraman	Human Resources; Poverty Alleviation; Indigenous & Minority Affairs	PH (DAP)	Banting	21 August 2023	Incumbent
Dato' Ir. Izham Hashim	Infrastructure Development; Agriculture & Plantation Modernisation; Food Security & Agro-based Industry	PH (AMANAH)	Pandan Indah	21 August 2023	Incumbent
Anfaal Saari	Women & Family Empowerment; Social Welfare; Care Economy	PH (AMANAH)	Taman Templer	21 August 2023	Incumbent
Datuk Rizam Ismail	Rural Development; Traditional Village Sustainability; National Unity; Consumer Affairs & Cooperative	BN (UMNO)	Sungai Air Tawar	21 August 2023	Incumbent

=== Ex officio members ===
Position	Officeholder
State Government Secretary	Ahmad Fadzli Ahmad Tajuddin
State Legal Advisor	Mohamad Onn Abd Aziz
State Financial Officer	Haniff Zainal Abidin

== Former compositions ==
=== Amirudin I EXCO (June 2018 – June 2023) ===
This State Executive Council was created after the formation of the Seventh Mahathir cabinet, which saw Azmin Ali appointed as the Minister of Economic Affairs, meaning that he had to relinquish his post as Menteri Besar. Subsequently, Azmin's protégé and close political ally, Amirudin Shari was nominated and sworn in as the next Menteri Besar on 19 June 2018.

Due to colon cancer, Prof. Dr. Shaharuddin Baharuddin died and was replaced by Mohd. Khairuddin Othman on 10 December 2018. Following the Sheraton Move, Abdul Rashid Asari and Haniza Mohamed Talha were removed from the State Executive Council. As a result, a reshuffle took place on 17 September 2020, with the appointments of Borhan Aman Shah and Zawawi Mughni as new members of the State Executive Council. The final makeup of the State Executive Council was completed on 7 October 2020, with the announcement of the portfolios for its members. After the Selangor State Legislative Assembly was dissolved on 23 June 2023 to pave the way for elections to be held, the State Executive Council was disbanded and members served in a caretaker capacity.

PH (11)
- PKR (6)
- DAP (3)
- AMANAH (2)

Member	Portfolio	Party	Constituency	Term start	Term end
Amirudin Shari (Menteri Besar)	Finance & Economy; Land & Natural Resource Development; Strategic Communication; Education; Innovation & Smart Selangor Inculturation; Disaster Management	PKR	Sungai Tua	19 June 2018	2023
Teng Chang Khim (Senior Member)	Investment; Trade & Industry; Small & Medium Enterprise	DAP	Bandar Baru Klang	30 May 2013	2023
Rodziah Ismail	Housing & Urban Wellbeing; Entrepreneur Development	PKR	Batu Tiga	19 June 2018	2023
Ganabatirau Veraman	Socio-Economic Development; Social Welfare; Employee Empowerment	DAP	Kota Kemuning	30 May 2013	2023
Ir. Izham Hashim	Infrastructure & Public Facilities; Agriculture & Agro-based Industry Modernisation	AMANAH	Pandan Indah	14 May 2018	2023
Ng Sze Han	Local Government; Public Transport; New Village Development	DAP	Kinrara	14 May 2018	2023
Dr. Siti Mariah Mahmud	Public Health; Unity; Women & Family Development	AMANAH	Seri Serdang	14 May 2018	2023
Hee Loy Sian	Tourism; Environment & Green Technology; Indigenous Affairs	PKR	Kajang	14 May 2018	2023
Mohd. Khairuddin Othman	Human Capital Development; Youth & Sports Development	PKR	Paya Jaras	10 December 2018	2023
Borhan Aman Shah	Rural & Traditional Village Development; Malay Customs, Culture & Heritage	PKR	Tanjong Sepat	17 September 2020	2023
Zawawi Mughni	Islamic Affairs; Consumer Affairs; Halal Industry	PKR	Sungai Kandis	17 September 2020	2023

=== Azmin II EXCO (2018) ===
PKR (5) DAP (3) AMANAH (2) BERSATU (1)

Name	Portfolios	Party	Constituency	Term start	Term end
Dato' Seri Mohamed Azmin Ali (Menteri Besar)	Land Development; Natural Resource Management; State Economic Action Council; Strategic Communications	PKR	Bukit Antarabangsa	2018	2018
Dato' Teng Chang Khim	Industry and Trade; Small and Medium Industries	DAP	Bandar Baru Klang	2018	18 May 2018
Amirudin Shari	Young Generation Empowerment & Sports; Entrepreneur Development; Rural Development; Traditional Villages	PKR	Sungai Tua	2018	18 May 2018
Ganabatirau Veraman	Empowerment and Socio-Economic Development; Caring Government	DAP	Kota Kemuning	2018	18 May 2018
Ir. Izham Hashim	Infrastructure; Public Facilities; Modernization of Agriculture; Agro-Based Industries	AMANAH	Pandan Indah	2018	18 May 2018
Datuk Abdul Rashid Asari	Culture; Tourism; Malay Civilisation; Heritage	BERSATU	Selat Kelang	2018	18 May 2018
Dr. Shaharuddin Badaruddin	Islamic Religious Affairs; Education; Human Capital Development; Science, Technology and Innovation	PKR	Seri Setia	2018	18 May 2018
Ng Sze Han	Local Government; Public Transport; New Villages Development	DAP	Kinrara	2018	18 May 2018
Haniza Mohamed Talha	Housing; Urban Living	PKR	Lembah Jaya	2018	18 May 2018
Dr. Siti Mariah Mahmud	Health; Welfare; Women and Family Empowerment	AMANAH	Seri Serdang	2018	18 May 2018
Hee Loy Sian	Environment; Green Technology; Consumer Affairs	PKR	Kajang	2018	18 May 2018

=== Azmin I EXCO (2014–2018) ===
PKR (5) DAP (3) PAS (3)

Name	Portfolios	Party	Constituency	Term start	Term end
Dato' Seri Mohamed Azmin Ali (Menteri Besar)	Land Development; Finance; State Economic Action Council	PKR	Bukit Antarabangsa	23 September 2014	19 June 2018
Elizabeth Wong Keat Ping	Tourism; Consumer Affairs; Environment; Green Technology	PKR	Bukit Lanjan	27 September 2014	13 May 2018
Amirudin Shari	Youth Generation Development; Sports; Culture; Entrepreneur Development	PKR	Batu Caves	27 September 2014	13 May 2018
Nik Nazmi	Education; Human Capital Development; Science; Technology and Innovation	PKR	Seri Setia	27 September 2014	13 May 2018
Daroyah Alwi	Health; Welfare; Woman Affairs and Family	PKR	Sementa	27 September 2014	13 May 2018
Zaidy Abdul Talib	Infrastructure; Public Facilities; Agro-based Industry	PAS	Taman Templer	27 September 2014	13 May 2018
Dato' Iskandar Abdul Samad	Housing; Urban Management; Urban Living	PAS	Chempaka	27 September 2014	13 May 2018
Dato' Ahmad Yunus Hairi	Religion; Malay Customs; Rural Development; Tradition Villages	PAS	Sijangkang	27 September 2014	13 May 2018
Dato' Teng Chang Khim	Investment; Industry; Small–Medium Industries; Trade; Transport	DAP	Sungai Pinang	27 September 2014	13 May 2018
Ganabatirau Veraman	Estate Workers; Poverty; Caring Government	DAP	Kota Alam Shah	27 September 2014	13 May 2018
Ean Yong Hian Wah	New Village Development; Illegal Factory Task Force	DAP	Seri Kembangan	27 September 2014	13 May 2018

=== Khalid II EXCO (2013–2014) ===
PKR (4) PAS (4) DAP (3)

Name	Portfolios	Party	Constituency	Term start	Term end
Tan Sri Dato' Seri Khalid Ibrahim (Menteri Besar)	Land Development; Finance; State Economic Action Council	PKR	Pelabuhan Klang	14 May 2013	22 September 2014
Halimah Ali	Education; Higher Education; Human Capital Development	PAS	Selat Klang	30 May 2013	22 September 2014
Iskandar Abdul Samad	Housing; Building Management; Building Settlers	PAS	Chempaka	30 May 2013	22 September 2014
Sallehen Mukhyi	Islamic Affairs; Agricultural Modernization; Village Development	PAS	Sabak	30 May 2013	22 September 2014
Ahmad Yunus Hairi	Youth and Sports; Infrastructure; Public Amenities	PAS	Sijangkang	30 May 2013	22 September 2014
Elizabeth Wong Keat Ping	Tourism; Consumer Affairs; Environment	PKR	Bukit Lanjan	30 May 2013	12 August 2014
Daroyah Alwi	Health; Entrepreneur Development; Science; Technology and Innovation	PKR	Sementa	30 May 2013	12 August 2014
Rodziah Ismail	Welfare; Women Affairs	PKR	Batu Tiga	30 May 2013	12 August 2014
Dato' Teng Chang Khim	Local Government; Studies and Research	DAP	Sungai Pinang	30 May 2013	12 August 2014
Ganabatirau Veraman	Estate Workers; Poverty; Caring Government	DAP	Kota Alam Shah	30 May 2013	12 August 2014
Ean Yong Hian Wah	New Village Development; Illegal Factory Task Force	DAP	Seri Kembangan	30 May 2013	12 August 2014

=== Khalid I EXCO (2008–2013) ===
PKR (5) DAP (3) PAS (3)

Name	Portfolios	Party	Constituency	Term start	Term end
Tan Sri Dato' Seri Khalid Ibrahim (Menteri Besar)	Land Development; Finance; State Economic Action Council; Youth & Sports (2008–2012); Islamic Affairs (2012–2013); Infrastructure (2012–2013); Public Amenities (2012–2013)	PKR	Ijok	13 March 2008	14 May 2013
Teresa Kok Suh Sim (Senior EXCO)	Investment; Trade; Industry	DAP	Kinrara	25 March 2008	14 May 2013
Dato' Dr. Hasan Mohamed Ali	Islamic Affairs; Malay Customs; Infrastructure; Public Amenities	PAS	Gombak Setia	25 March 2008	8 January 2012
Dr. Ahmad Yunus Hairi	Malay Customs; Youth and Sports	PAS	Sijangkang	18 February 2012	14 May 2013
Yaakob Sapari	Modernisation of Agriculture; Natural Resources; Entrepreneurial Development	PKR	Kota Anggerik	25 March 2008	14 May 2013
Rodziah Ismail	Welfare; Women Affairs; Science; Technology and Innovation	PKR	Batu Tiga	25 March 2008	14 May 2013
Dr. Xavier Jayakumar Arulanandam	Health; Plantation Workers; Poverty; Friendly Government	PKR	Seri Andalas	25 March 2008	14 May 2013
Dr. Halimah Ali	Education; Higher Education; Human Capital Development	PAS	Selat Klang	25 March 2008	14 May 2013
Iskandar Abdul Samad	Housing; Building Management; Squatters	PAS	Chempaka	25 March 2008	14 May 2013
Ronnie Liu Tian Khiew	Local Government; Research & Development	DAP	Pandamaran	25 March 2008	14 May 2013
Elizabeth Wong Keat Ping	Tourism; Consumer Affairs; Environment	PKR	Bukit Lanjan	25 March 2008	14 May 2013
Ean Yong Hian Wah	New Village Development; Illegal Factory Settlement	DAP	Seri Kembangan	25 March 2008	14 May 2013

=== Khir Toyo II EXCO (2004–2008) ===
UMNO (7) MCA (2) MIC (1) Gerakan (1)

Name	Portfolios	Party	Constituency	Term start	Term end
Dr. Mohamad Khir Toyo (Menteri Besar)	Land and Finance; Local Government; State Economic Action Council	UMNO	Sungai Panjang	2004	2008
Abdul Rahman Palil	Islamic Affairs; Infrastructure; Public Amenities; Friendly Government	UMNO	Sementa	2004	2008
Seripah Noli Syed Hussin	Welfare; Women's Affairs	UMNO	Seri Setia	2004	2008
Ahmad Nawawi Mohd Zin	Education; Higher Education; Human Capital Development	UMNO	Kota Anggerik	2004	2008
Abdul Fatah Iskandar	Malay Customs	UMNO	Sijangkang	2004	2008
Mohd Mokhtar Ahmad Dahlan	Housing; Building Management; Squatters	UMNO	Kota Damansara	2004	2008
Raja Ideris Raja Ahmad		UMNO	Sabak	2004	2008
Tang See Hang	Investment; Trade; Industry	MCA	Rawang	2004	2008
Ch'ng Toh Eng	Science, Technology and Innovation; Environment	MCA	Kuala Kubu Baharu	2004	2008
Sivalingam Arumugam Karuppiah		MIC	Ijok	2004	4 April 2007
Kamala Ganapathy	Plantation Workers	MIC	Seri Andalas	2007	2008
Lim Thuang Seng	Health; Tourism; Consumer Affairs	Gerakan	Bukit Gasing	2004	2008

=== Khir Toyo I EXCO (2000–2004) ===
UMNO (7) MCA (2) MIC (1) Gerakan (1)

Name	Portfolios	Party	Constituency	Term start	Term end
Mohamad Khir Toyo (Menteri Besar)	Finance and Budget; Land; Islamic Affairs; State Privatisation; People-Friendly Administration; People Development	UMNO	Sungai Panjang	2000	2004
Zainal Abidin Ahmad (Deputy Menteri Besar)	Planning; Research and Development; Education; Ex-servicemen and Ex-policemen Affairs Rehabilitation; Religious Affairs; Research and Humanity Development	UMNO	Dusun Tua	2000	2004
Tang See Hang	Investment and Industry; Domestic Trade and Consumer Affairs; Health	MCA	Rawang	2000	2004
Ch'ng Toh Eng	New Villages Development; Information Technology	MCA	Kuala Kubu Baharu	2000	2004
Abdul Fatah Iskandar	Entrepreneur Development; Youth; Small and Medium Scale Industries	UMNO	Sijangkang	2000	2004
Sivalingam Arumugam Karuppiah	Estate Workers Housing and Mines; Unity	MIC	Ijok	2000	2004
Mohd Sharif Jajang	Infrastructure; Information; Malay Reserve Land	UMNO	Dengkil	2000	2004
Mohd Mokhtar Ahmad Dahalan	Local Government; Environment; Housing; Squatters	UMNO	Kelana Jaya	2000	2004
Norkhaila Jamaluddin	Welfare; Women Affairs; Culture	UMNO	Taman Medan	2000	2004
Raja Ideris Raja Ahmad	Rural Development; Sport; Agriculture; Forestry	UMNO	Sabak	2000	2004
Lum Weng Keong	Tourism; Science and Technology; Organisation Development	Gerakan	Bukit Lanjan	2000	2004

=== Abu Hassan II EXCO (1999–2000) ===
UMNO (7) MCA (2) MIC (1) Gerakan (1)

Name	Portfolios	Party	Constituency	Term start	Term end
Dato' Seri Abu Hassan Omar (Menteri Besar)	Finance and Budget; Planning; Privatisation; Land and Housing	UMNO	Permatang	1999	2000
Dato' Zainal Abidin Ahmad (Deputy Menteri Besar of Selangor)	Islamic religious affairs; Education; Human Development	UMNO	Dusun Tua	1999	2000
Datuk Abdul Fatah Iskandar	Entrepreneur Development; Small and Medium Scale Industry; Youth and Sports	UMNO	Sijangkang	1999	2000
Dato' Mohd Sharif Jajang	Infrastructure; Information; Information Technology	UMNO	Dengkil	1999	2000
Mohd Mokhtar Ahmad Dahlan	Housing; Local Government; Squatters	UMNO	Kelana Jaya	1999	2000
Raja Ideris Raja Ahmad	Rural Development; Agriculture and Fisheries	UMNO	Sabak	1999	2000
Norkhaila Jamaluddin	Women's Affairs; Unity and Community Development	UMNO	Taman Medan	1999	2000
Dato' Tang See Hang	Investment; Industry; Research and Development	MCA	Rawang	1999	2000
Dato' Ch'ng Toh Eng	Culture; Tourism; Science, Technology and Environment	MCA	Kuala Kubu Bahru	1999	2000
Dato' Sivalingam Arumugam Karuppiah	Domestic Trade and Consumer Affairs; Housing for Estate and Mines Workers	MIC	Ijok	1999	2000
Lum Weng Keong	Health; Village Development	Gerakan	Bukit Lanjan	1999	2000

=== Abu Hassan I EXCO (1997–1999) ===
UMNO (7) MCA (2) MIC (1) Gerakan (1)

Name	Portfolios	Party	Constituency	Term start	Term end
Abu Hassan Omar (Menteri Besar)	Religious Affairs; Finance and Budget; Planning; Privatisation; Land and Housing	UMNO	Permatang	7 June 1997	1999
Zainal Dahalan	Rural Development; Entrepreneur Development	UMNO	Sungai Air Tawar	7 June 1997	1999
Tang See Hang	Village Development; Domestic Trade and Consumer Affairs	MCA	Rawang	7 June 1997	1999
Zainal Abidin Ahmad	Posting and Education; Human Development	UMNO	Dusun Tua	7 June 1997	1999
Rakibah Abdul Manap	Infrastructure (1997–1998); Women Development	UMNO	Gombak Setia	7 June 1997	1999
Ch'ng Toh Eng	Youth and Sports; Science, Technology and Environment	MCA	Kuala Kubu Baharu	7 June 1997	1999
Abdul Fatah Iskandar	Agriculture and Fishery; Research and Development	UMNO	Sijangkang	7 June 1997	1999
Sivalingam Arumugam Karuppiah	Unity; Community Development; Housing for Estate and Mines Workers	MIC	Ijok	7 June 1997	1999
Mohd Sharif Jajang	Industry and Investment; Information and Information Technology	UMNO	Dengkil	7 June 1997	1999
Pius Martin	Health; Culture; Tourism	Gerakan	Bukit Lanjan	7 June 1997	1999
Fuad Hassan	Local Authority; Urbanisation; Squatters; Infrastructure (1998–1999)	UMNO	Hulu Kelang	7 June 1997	1999
