= Government of Selangor =

Executive and legislative authorities governing the Malaysian state of Selangor

State Government of Selangor
- Kerajaan Negeri Selangor
- State government
- Coat of arms of Selangor

Overview
- Established: 31 August 1957 (69 years ago)
- State: Selangor
- Leader: Menteri Besar
- Appointed by: Sultan
- Main organ: Selangor State Executive Council
- Ministries: 15 departments
- Responsible to: Selangor State Legislative Assembly
- Annual budget: RM 3 billion (2025)
- Headquarters: Sultan Salahuddin Abdul Aziz Shah Building, Shah Alam
- Website: www.selangor.gov.my

The Government of Selangor, officially the State Government of Selangor, refers to the government authority of the Malaysian state of Selangor. The state government adheres to and is created by both the Federal Constitution of Malaysia, the supreme law of Malaysia, and the Constitution of the State of Selangor, the supreme law in Selangor. The government of Selangor is based in Shah Alam, the state's capital city.

The state government consists of only two branches – executive and legislative. The Selangor State Executive Council forms the executive branch, whilst the Selangor State Legislative Assembly is the legislature of the state government. Selangor's head of government is the Menteri Besar. The state government does not have a judiciary branch, as Malaysia's judicial system is a federalised system operating uniformly throughout the country.

== Executive ==
=== Head of government ===
The Menteri Besar is the head of government in Selangor. He is officially appointed by the Sultan, Selangor's head of state, on the basis of the latter's judgement that the former commands the confidence of the majority of the State Assemblymen in the Selangor State Legislative Assembly. The Menteri Besar and his Executive Council shall be collectively responsible to Legislative Assembly. The Office of the Menteri Besar is situated inside Sultan Salahuddin Abdul Aziz Shah Building in Shah Alam.

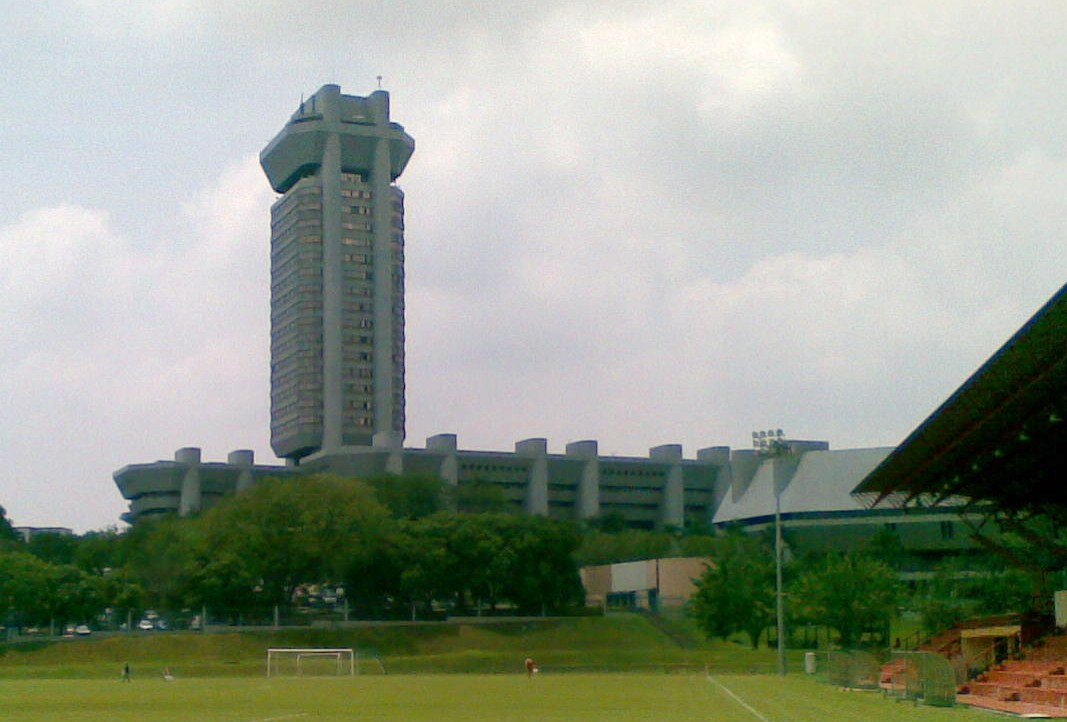
The Sultan Salahuddin Abdul Aziz Shah Building houses the Office of the Menteri Besar of Selangor, as well as other state government offices.

The Menteri Besar of Selangor is Amirudin Shari of the Pakatan Harapan (PH) coalition that holds the most seats in the State Legislative Assembly among the three coalitions in the state assembly. Amirudin assumed office on 19 June 2018, having been elected as a Member of the State Legislative Assembly in the 2018 and 2023 state elections that also returned PH to power.

=== Cabinet ===
The Selangor State Executive Council forms the executive branch of the Selangor state government and is analogous in function to the Malaysian federal Cabinet. The Executive Council is led by the Menteri Besar and made up of between four and 10 other State Assemblymen from the Selangor State Legislative Assembly. Aside from these, three other ex officio members of the Executive Council are the State Secretary, the State Legal Adviser and the State Financial Officer.

Following the 2023 Selangor state election, Amirudin Shari was reappointed as the Menteri Besar after Pakatan Harapan (PH) and Barisan Nasional (BN) were reelected to power and formed a coalition state government.

PH (10)	BN (1)
PKR (4); DAP (4); AMANAH (2)	UMNO (1)

All members were sworn in on 21 August 2023 following the 2023 Selangor state election on 12 August, while portfolios were announced on 23 August 2023.

Member	Portfolio (Standing Committee)	Party	State Constituency	Date
Amirudin Shari (Menteri Besar)	Land & Natural Resource Development; Finance & Economic Action; Administrative Modernisation & Government Digitalisation; Strategic Communication; Education & Human Capital Development	PH (PKR)	Sungai Tua	19 June 2018
Borhan Aman Shah	Housing & Sustainable Urban Development; Culture, Malay Customs & Heritage	PH (PKR)	Tanjong Sepat	17 September 2020
Mohd Najwan Halimi	Youth & Sports Development; Entrepreneur & Creative Economy Empowerment; Disaster Management	PH (PKR)	Kota Anggerik	21 August 2023
Mohammad Fahmi Ngah	Islamic Affairs; Halal Industry; Science, Technology & Innovation Acculturation; Digital Infrastructure	PH (PKR)	Seri Setia	21 August 2023
Ng Sze Han	Investment & Trade; SME & New Economic Region Development; Selangor Mobility; Co-chair, LIMAS	PH (DAP)	Kinrara	14 May 2018
Ng Suee Lim	Local Government Development; Tourism; New Village Development; Co-chair, LIMAS	PH (DAP)	Sekinchan	21 August 2023
Jamaliah Jamaluddin	Public Health; Environment, Climate Change & Green Technology	PH (DAP)	Bandar Utama	21 August 2023
Papparaidu Veraman	Human Resources; Poverty Alleviation; Indigenous & Minority Affairs; Co-chair, LIMAS	PH (DAP)	Banting	21 August 2023
Izham Hashim	Infrastructure Development; Agriculture & Plantation Modernisation; Food Security & Agro-based Industry	PH (AMANAH)	Pandan Indah	14 May 2018
Anfaal Saari	Women & Family Empowerment; Social Welfare; Care Economy	PH (AMANAH)	Taman Templer	21 August 2023
Rizam Ismail	Rural Development; Traditional Village Sustainability; National Unity; Consumer & Cooperative Affairs	BN (UMNO)	Sungai Air Tawar	21 August 2023

=== Ex officio members ===
Position	Officeholder
State Government Secretary	Ahmad Fadzli Ahmad Tajuddin
State Legal Advisor	Mohammad Onn Abd Aziz
State Financial Officer	Haniff Zainal Abidin

== Legislature ==
Composition of the Selangor State Legislative Assembly after the 2023 Selangor state election. Pakatan Harapan (PH) holds 32 seats. Perikatan Nasional (PN) holds 22 seats. Barisan Nasional (BN) holds 2 seats.

The Selangor State Legislative Assembly is the legislative branch of the Selangor state government. The unicameral legislature consists of 56 seats that represent the 56 state constituencies within Selangor, with each constituency being represented by an elected State Assemblyman. The Legislative Assembly convenes at the Sultan Salahuddin Abdul Aziz Shah Building in Shah Alam.

The legislature has a maximum mandate of five years by law and follows a multi-party system; the ruling party (or coalition) is elected through a first-past-the-post system. The Sultan may dissolve the legislature at any time and usually does so upon the advice of the Menteri Besar.

A Speaker is elected by the Legislative Assembly to preside over the proceedings and debates of the legislature. The Speaker may or may not be an elected State Assemblyman; in the case of the latter, the elected Speaker shall become a member of the Legislative Assembly additional to the elected State Assemblymen already in the legislature.

== Selangor State Government Secretariat ==
- Internal Audit Division
- Integrity Unit
- Corporate Division
- Strategic Management Branch

=== Development Cluster ===
- State Economic Action Council
- State Economic Planning Unit
  - Macro and Privatisation Section
  - Sectoral Section
  - Local Authority Section
  - Distribution and Development Section

=== Management Cluster ===
- Human Resource Management Division
- Information Management Division
- Selangor State Legislative Assembly
- Management Service Division
- Office of Menteri Besar of Selangor
- Selangor State Executive Council

== Departments, statutory bodies and subsidiaries ==
=== Departments ===
- Treasury of the State of Selangor
- Selangor Islamic Religious Department
- Selangor Irrigation and Drainage Department
- Office of His Royal Highness the Sultan of Selangor
- Selangor Mufti Department
- Selangor Public Works Department
- Selangor Land and Mines Office
- Selangor State Public Service Commission
- Selangor Urban and Rural Planning Department
- Selangor Agriculture Department
- Selangor Forestry Department
- Selangor Social Welfare Department
- Selangor Veterinary Services Department
- Selangor Syariah Judicial Department
- Selangor Syariah Prosecution Department

=== Statutory bodies ===
- Selangor State Development Corporation
- Selangor Public Library Corporation
- Selangor Malay Customs and Heritage Corporation
- Selangor Agricultural Development Corporation
- Selangor Water Management Board
- Selangor Housing and Property Board
- Selangor State Sports Council
- Selangor Islamic Religious Council
- Selangor Zakat Board
- Selangor Waqf Corporation
- Selangor Technical Skills Development Centre (STDC)

=== Subsidiaries ===
- Menteri Besar of Selangor (Incorporated)
  - Commercial cluster
    - Smart Selangor Delivery Unit
    - Koridor Utiliti Selangor Sdn. Bhd.
      - SMARTSEL Sdn. Bhd.
    - Permodalan Negeri Selangor Berhad
    - Landasan Lumayan Sdn. Bhd.
    - Kumpulan Semesta Sdn. Bhd.
    - Kumpulan Perangsang Selangor Berhad (KPS Berhad)
    - Kumpulan Hartanah Selangor Berhad
    - KDEB Waste Management Sdn. Bhd.
    - Darul Ehsan Facilities Management Sdn. Bhd.
    - Bukit Beruntung Golf & Country Resort Sdn. Bhd.
    - Pengurusan Air Selangor Sdn. Bhd.
  - Strategic cluster
    - Tourism Selangor Sdn. Bhd.
    - Yayasan Warisan Anak Selangor
    - Yayasan Hijrah Selangor
    - Selangor Technical Skills Development Centre (STDC)
    - Unisel
    - Media Selangor
    - Invest Selangor
- Selangor Foundation

== District and Lands Offices ==
- Gombak District
- Hulu Langat District
- Hulu Selangor District
- Klang District
- Kuala Langat District
- Kuala Selangor District
- Petaling District
- Sabak Bernam District
- Sepang District

== Local governments ==
1. Ampang Jaya Municipal Council (MPAJ)
2. Hulu Selangor Municipal Council (MPHS)
3. Kajang Municipal Council (MPKJ)
4. Klang Royal City Council (MBDK)
5. Kuala Langat Municipal Council (MPKL)
6. Kuala Selangor Municipal Council (MPKS)
7. Petaling Jaya City Council (MBPJ)
8. Sabak Bernam District Council (MDSB)
9. Selayang Municipal Council (MPS)
10. Sepang Municipal Council (MPSepang)
11. Shah Alam City Council (MBSA)
12. Subang Jaya City Council (MBSJ)

== See also ==
- Menteri Besar of Selangor
- Selangor State Executive Council
- Selangor State Legislative Assembly
- Elections in Selangor
