= Halimah Ali =

Malaysian politician and doctor

Yang Berhormat Halimah Ali JSM MP
- حليمة علي
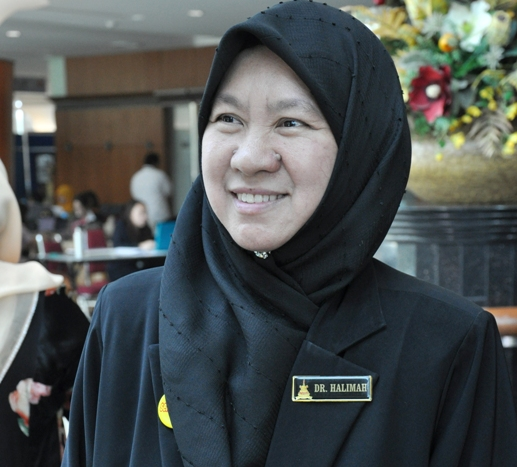

Member of the Malaysian Parliament for Kapar
- Incumbent
- Assumed office 19 November 2022
- Preceded by: Abdullah Sani Abdul Hamid (PH–PKR)
- Majority: 11,782 (2022)

Member of the Selangor State Executive Council (Education, Higher Education and Human Capital Development)
- In office 25 March 2008 – 26 September 2014
- Monarch: Sharafuddin
- Menteri Besar: Khalid Ibrahim
- Preceded by: Ahmad Nawawi M. Zin
- Succeeded by: Nik Nazmi Nik Ahmad
- Constituency: Selat Klang

Member of the Selangor State Legislative Assembly for Selat Klang
- In office 8 March 2008 – 9 May 2018
- Preceded by: Norliza Ahmad (BN–UMNO)
- Succeeded by: Abdul Rashid Asari (PH–BERSATU)
- Majority: 1,459 (2008); 2,754 (2013)

Personal details
- Born: Halimah binti Ali; 27 June 1960 (age 66) Marudi, Crown Colony of Sarawak (now Sarawak, Malaysia)
- Citizenship: Malaysian
- Party: Malaysian Islamic Party (PAS)
- Other political affiliations: Barisan Alternatif (BA); Pakatan Rakyat (PR); Gagasan Sejahtera (GS); Perikatan Nasional (PN)
- Spouse: Ahmad Supian
- Children: 6
- Education: University of Tasmania
- Occupation: Politician
- Profession: Doctor

Halimah binti Ali (born 27 June 1960) is a Malaysian politician and doctor who has served as the Member of Parliament (MP) for Kapar since November 2022. She served as Member of the Selangor State Executive Council (EXCO) in the Pakatan Rakyat (PR) state administration under former Menteri Besar Khalid Ibrahim from March 2008 to September 2014 and Member of the Selangor State Legislative Assembly (MLA) for Selat Klang from March 2008 to May 2018. She is a member of the Malaysian Islamic Party (PAS), a component party of the Perikatan Nasional (PN) and formerly PR coalitions. She was also the Chairperson of the Selangor Public Library Corporation (PPAS) and Chairperson of the National Unity Committee of PAS of Selangor.

== Controversies and issues ==
=== Comments on Menu Rahmah ===
She delivered a speech in Parliament criticising the quality of the cheaper and more affordable food and beverages offered by the Menu Rahmah initiative, introduced by the Ministry of Domestic Trade and Costs of Living. This initiative aimed to ease the economic and financial burden of low-income consumers. She claimed that the food and beverages would increase of risk of various medical conditions, including cancer and autism. Her speech has been controversial and received sharp criticism from the government and autism groups. She initially denied that her speech was linked to Menu Rahmah but subsequently apologised, stating that her speech had been misinterpreted.

== Election results ==
Selangor State Legislative Assembly
Year	Constituency	Candidate	Votes	Pct	Opponent(s)	Votes	Pct	Ballots cast	Majority	Turnout
2004	N45 Selat Klang	Halimah Ali (PAS)	6,508	34.07%	Norliza Ahmad (UMNO)	12,593	65.93%	19,447	6,085	71.68%
2008	N45 Selat Klang	Halimah Ali (PAS)	11,437	53.41%	Norliza Ahmad (UMNO)	9,978	46.59%	21,787	1,459	75.37%
2013	N45 Selat Klang	Halimah Ali (PAS)	17,085	54.38%	Faisal Yahya (UMNO)	14,331	45.62%	31,874	2,754	86.40%
2018	N44 Selat Klang	Halimah Ali (PAS)	11,766	34.52%	Abdul Rashid Asari (BERSATU)	12,266	35.99%	34,571	500	83.55%
2018	N44 Selat Klang	Halimah Ali (PAS)	11,766	34.52%	Mohd Khairi Hussin (UMNO)	9,949	24.19%	34,571	500	83.55%
2018	N44 Selat Klang	Halimah Ali (PAS)	11,766	34.52%	Jeichandran Wadivelu (PRM)	52	0.15%	34,571	500	83.55%
2018	N44 Selat Klang	Halimah Ali (PAS)	11,766	34.52%	Zainal Azwar Kamaruddin (IND)	49	0.14%	34,571	500	83.55%
2018	N32 Seri Setia	Halimah Ali (PAS)	9,698	41.40%	Halimey Abu Bakar (PKR)	13,725	58.60%	23,615	4,027	44.15%

Parliament of Malaysia
Year	Constituency	Candidate	Votes	Pct	Opponent(s)	Votes	Pct	Ballots cast	Majority	Turnout
2022	P109 Kapar	Halimah Ali (PAS)	65,751	41.61%	Abdullah Sani Abdul Hamid (PKR)	53,969	34.15%	158,030	11,782	83.45%
2022	P109 Kapar	Halimah Ali (PAS)	65,751	41.61%	Muhammad Noor Azman (UMNO)	35,079	22.20%	158,030	11,782	83.45%
2022	P109 Kapar	Halimah Ali (PAS)	65,751	41.61%	Mohd Pathan Hussin (PEJUANG)	1,015	0.64%	158,030	11,782	83.45%
2022	P109 Kapar	Halimah Ali (PAS)	65,751	41.61%	Daroyah Alwi (PBM)	1,474	0.93%	158,030	11,782	83.45%
2022	P109 Kapar	Halimah Ali (PAS)	65,751	41.61%	VP Sevelinggam (IND)	477	0.30%	158,030	11,782	83.45%
2022	P109 Kapar	Halimah Ali (PAS)	65,751	41.61%	Rahim Awang (WARISAN)	265	0.17%	158,030	11,782	83.45%

== Honours ==
=== Honours of Malaysia ===
- Malaysia
  - Companion of the Order of Loyalty to the Crown of Malaysia (JSM) (2021)
  - Recipient of the 17th Yang di-Pertuan Agong Installation Medal (2024)
