= Shaharuddin Badaruddin =

Malaysian politician (1962–2018)

- شهرالدين بدرالدين

Member of the Selangor State Executive Council
- In office 14 May 2018 – 2 August 2018 (Islamic Religious Affairs, Education, Human Capital Development, Science, Technology and Innovation)
- Monarch: Sharafuddin
- Menteri Besar: Mohamed Azmin Ali; Amirudin Shari
- Preceded by: Ahmad Yunus Hairi (Islamic Religious Affairs); Nik Nazmi Nik Ahmad (Education, Human Capital Development, Science, Technology and Innovation)
- Succeeded by: Amirudin Shari (Islamic Religious Affairs and Education); Mohd. Khairuddin Othman (Human Capital Development); Hee Loy Sian (Science, Technology and Innovation)
- Constituency: Seri Setia

Member of the Selangor State Assembly for Seri Setia
- In office 10 May 2018 – 2 August 2018
- Preceded by: Nik Nazmi Nik Ahmad (PR–PKR)
- Succeeded by: Halimey Abu Bakar (PH–PKR)
- Majority: 19,372 (2018)

Personal details
- Born: Shaharuddin bin Badaruddin; 19 September 1962 Tanjong Karang, Kuala Selangor District, Selangor, Malaysia
- Died: 2 August 2018 (aged 55) Putrajaya, Malaysia
- Resting place: Kampung Limau Manis Cemetery, Kajang, Selangor, Malaysia
- Citizenship: Malaysian
- Party: People's Justice Party (PKR) (–2018)
- Other political affiliations: Pakatan Harapan (–2018)
- Spouse: Adibah binti Ahmad
- Children: 6
- Education: University of Malaya; Roosevelt University
- Occupation: Politician

Shaharuddin bin Badaruddin (19 September 1962 – 2 August 2018) was a Malaysian politician.

Shaharuddin was the vice president of the People's Justice Party (PKR), a component party in the Pakatan Harapan (PH) ruling coalition. Shaharuddin was elected to represent Seri Setia constituency in the Selangor State Legislative Assembly during the 2018 general election. He defeated three other candidates on 9 May 2018 and was appointed as the state executive councillor on 14 May 2018. Shaharuddin was the chairman of the Selangor Islamic Affairs, Education and Human Capital Development Committee.

== Death ==
Badaruddin died of stage four colon cancer on 2 August 2018 at 6.28 pm at the Putrajaya Hospital at age 55. Shaharuddin's remains were brought to his residence at Desa Pinggiran Putra, Kajang before being brought to the Jamiurrahmah Mosque at Kampung Limau Manis, Sungai Merab for prayers and then burial at Kampung Limau Manis Cemetery the next day. Prime Minister Mahathir Mohamad conveyed his condolences over his passing.

Badaruddin's death had let to the vacancy of Seri Setia state constituency. This led to the 2018 Seri Setia by-election on 8 September 2018 which resulted inHalimey Abu Bakar from PKR defeating Malaysian Islamic Party (PAS) candidate Halimah Ali to retain the seat.

== Election results ==
Selangor State Legislative Assembly
Year	Constituency	Candidate	Votes	Pct	Opponent(s)	Votes	Pct	Ballots cast	Majority	Turnout
2018	N32 Seri Setia	Shaharuddin Badaruddin (PKR)	29,250	66.62%	Yusoff M Haniff (UMNO)	9,878	22.50%	44,457	19,372	84.44%
2018	N32 Seri Setia	Shaharuddin Badaruddin (PKR)	29,250	66.62%	Mohd Ghazali Daud (PAS)	4,563	10.39%	44,457	19,372	84.44%
2018	N32 Seri Setia	Shaharuddin Badaruddin (PKR)	29,250	66.62%	Vigweswaran T.Subramaniam (IND)	217	0.49%	44,457	19,372	84.44%
