= Halimey Abu Bakar =

Malaysian politician

- حالمي ابو بكر

Member of the Selangor State Legislative Assembly for Seri Setia
- In office 8 September 2018 – 12 August 2023
- Preceded by: Shaharuddin Badaruddin (PH–PKR)
- Succeeded by: Mohammad Fahmi Ngah (PH–PKR)
- Majority: 4,027 (2018)

Faction represented in Selangor State Legislative Assembly
- 2018–2023: Pakatan Harapan

Personal details
- Born: 17 October 1972 (age 54) Selangor, Malaysia
- Citizenship: Malaysian
- Party: People's Justice Party (PKR)
- Other political affiliations: Pakatan Harapan (PH)
- Spouse: Suhati Bakri
- Children: 3
- Occupation: Politician

Halimey bin Abu Bakar is a Malaysian politician who served as Member of the Selangor State Legislative Assembly (MLA) for Seri Setia from September 2018 to August 2023. He is a member of the People's Justice Party (PKR), a component party of the Pakatan Harapan (PH) coalition.

== Election results ==
Selangor State Legislative Assembly
Year	Constituency	Candidate	Votes	Pct	Opponent(s)	Votes	Pct	Ballots cast	Majority	Turnout
2018	N32 Seri Setia	Halimey Abu Bakar (PKR)	13,725	58.60%	Halimah Ali (PAS)	9,698	41.40%	23,615	4,027	44.15%
