= Kelana Jaya (disambiguation) =

Kelana Jaya may refer to:

- Kelana Jaya
- Kelana Jaya (federal constituency), represented in the Dewan Rakyat (2004–present)
- Kelana Jaya (state constituency), formerly represented in the Selangor State Legislative Assembly (1986–2004)
