= Raja Ideris Raja Ahmad =

Malaysian politician

Yang Mulia Dato' Raja Ideris Raja Ahmad DSSA SSA AMN AMS PJK
- راج ايدريس راج احمد

Member of the Selangor State Executive Council
- In office 2004–2008
- Monarch: Sharafuddin
- Menteri Besar: Khir Toyo
- Constituency: Sabak
- In office 2000–2004
- Monarchs: Salahuddin (2000–2001); Sharafuddin (2001–2004)
- Menteri Besar: Khir Toyo
- Portfolio: Rural Development, Sport, Agriculture and Forestry
- Constituency: Sabak
- In office 1999–2000
- Monarch: Salahuddin
- Menteri Besar: Abu Hassan Omar
- Portfolio: Rural Development, Agriculture and Fisheries
- Constituency: Sabak

Member of the Selangor State Legislative Assembly for Sungai Air Tawar
- In office 8 March 2008 – 5 May 2013
- Preceded by: Abdul Rahman Bakri (BN–UMNO)
- Succeeded by: Kamarol Zaki Abdul Malek (BN–UMNO)
- Majority: 123 (2008)

Member of the Selangor State Legislative Assembly for Sabak
- In office 21 October 1990 – 8 March 2008
- Preceded by: Mohamad Yusof Abdul Latif (BN–UMNO)
- Succeeded by: Warno Dogol (BN–UMNO)
- Majority: 3,827 (1990); 4,654 (1995); 615 (1999); 2,256 (2004)

Personal details
- Born: Raja Ideris bin Raja Ahmad; 1944 Japanese occupation of Malaya
- Died: 17 September 2025 (aged 80–81) Selangor, Malaysia
- Party: United Malays National Organisation (UMNO) (–2025)
- Other political affiliations: Barisan Nasional (BN) (–2025)

Raja Ideris bin Raja Ahmad (1944–17 September 2025) was a Malaysian politician who served as Member of the Selangor State Executive Council (EXCO) in the Barisan Nasional (BN) state administration under former Menteri Besar Khir Toyo from 2000 to the collapse of the BN administration in 2008, Abu Hassan Omar from 1999 to 2000 as well as Member of the Selangor State Legislative Assembly (MLA) for Sungai Air Tawar from March 2008 to May 2013 and Sabak from October 1990 to May 2008.

Raja Ideris did not contest the 2013 general election.

== Issues and controversies ==
On 9 November 2009, he filed an originating summons together with Morib MLA Hasiman Sidom and Kuala Kubu Baharu MLA Wong Koon Mun against Teng Chang Khim and six Select Committee members. The summons was filed at the Shah Alam High Court registry. Their lawyers were Datuk V. Sithambaram, Kamarul Hisham Kamaruddin and Balvinder Singh Kenth. Also sued were the Speaker of the Selangor State Legislative Assembly, the Secretary of the Selangor State Legislative Assembly and the Selangor State Government. However, Article 72 (1) of the Federal Constitution states that any proceedings of the legislative assembly cannot be brought in court. Therefore, this suit does not meet the locus standi.

== Death ==
Raja Ideris Raja Ahmad died on 17 September 2025. He was 81.

== Election results ==
Selangor State Legislative Assembly
Year	Constituency	Candidate	Votes	Pct	Opponent(s)	Votes	Pct	Ballots cast	Majority	Turnout
1990	N02 Sabak	Raja Ideris Raja Ahmad (UMNO)	5,357	74.79%	Khalid Siri (S46)	1,530	21.36%	7,548	3,827	68.50%
1990	N02 Sabak	Raja Ideris Raja Ahmad (UMNO)	5,357	74.79%	Othman Mohd @ Kudu (IND)	276	3.85%	7,548	3,827	68.50%
1995	N02 Sabak	Raja Ideris Raja Ahmad (UMNO)	5,534	86.28%	Idris Omar (S46)	880	13.72%	6,751	4,654	63.42%
1999	N02 Sabak	Raja Ideris Raja Ahmad (UMNO)	3,679	54.56%	Mohamad Yunos (PAS)	3,064	45.44%	6,982	615	67.43%
2004	N02 Sabak	Raja Ideris Raja Ahmad (UMNO)	7,864	58.37%	Sallehen Mukhyi (PAS)	5,608	41.63%	13,804	2,256	75.63%
2008	N01 Sungai Air Tawar	Raja Ideris Raja Ahmad (UMNO)	4,791	50.65%	Azrulhakim Suradi (PAS)	4,668	49.35%	9,751	123	76.62%

== Honours ==
- Malaysia
  - Member of the Order of the Defender of the Realm (AMN) (1989)
- Selangor
  - Knight Companion of the Order of Sultan Salahuddin Abdul Aziz Shah (DSSA) – Dato' (1999)
  - Companion of the Order of Sultan Salahuddin Abdul Aziz Shah (SSA) (1997)
  - Member of the Order of the Crown of Selangor (AMS) (1994)
  - Recipient of the Meritorious Service Medal (PJK) (1985)
