= Seripah Noli Syed Hussin =

Malaysian politician

Yang Berbahagia Datin Paduka Seripah Noli Syed Hussin DSSA AMS
- شريفة نولي سيد حسين

Member of the Selangor State Executive Council
- In office 2004 – 2008 (Welfare and Women's Affairs)
- Monarch: Sharafuddin
- Menteri Besar: Mohamed Khir Toyo
- Preceded by: Norkhaila Jamaluddin
- Succeeded by: Rodziah Ismail
- Constituency: Seri Setia

Member of the Malaysian Parliament for Sepang
- In office 25 April 1995 – 21 March 2004
- Preceded by: Mohd. Sharif Jajang (BN–UMNO)
- Succeeded by: Mohd Zin Mohamed (BN–UMNO)
- Majority: 15,669 (1995); 7,162 (1999)

Member of the Selangor State Legislative Assembly for Seri Setia
- In office 21 March 2004 – 8 March 2008
- Preceded by: Constituency created
- Succeeded by: Nik Nazmi (PR–PKR)
- Majority: 11,141 (2004)

Personal details
- Born: Selangor, Malaysia
- Citizenship: Malaysian
- Party: United Malays National Organisation (UMNO)
- Other political affiliations: Barisan Nasional (BN); Muafakat Nasional (MN)
- Education: Western Michigan University
- Occupation: Politician

Seripah Noli binti Syed Hussin is a Malaysian politician and served as Selangor State Executive Councillor.

== Election results ==
Parliament of Malaysia
Year	Constituency	Candidate	Votes	Pct	Opponent(s)	Votes	Pct	Ballots cast	Majority	Turnout
1995	P102 Sepang	Seripah Noli Syed Hussin (UMNO)	26,022	71.54%	Suhaimi Kamaruddin (S46)	10,353	28.46%	38,182	15,669	73.33%
1999	P102 Sepang	Seripah Noli Syed Hussin (UMNO)	23,069	59.19%	Mohamed Makki Ahmad (PAS)	15,907	40.81%	40,145	7,162	74.12%

Selangor State Legislative Assembly
Year	Constituency	Candidate	Votes	Pct	Opponent(s)	Votes	Pct	Ballots cast	Majority	Turnout
2004	N32 Seri Setia	Seripah Noli Syed Hussin (UMNO)	16,911	74.56%	Mastura Muhamad (PAS)	5,770	25.44%	25,159	11,141	68.29%
2008	N32 Seri Setia	Seripah Noli Syed Hussin (UMNO)	10,975	44.23%	Nik Nazmi Nik Ahmad (PKR)	13,838	55.77%	25,163	2,863	71.73%

== Honours ==
- Selangor
  - Knight Companion of the Order of Sultan Salahuddin Abdul Aziz Shah (DSSA) – Datin Paduka (2000)
  - Member of the Order of the Crown of Selangor (AMS) (1996)
