= Abdul Rashid Asari =

Malaysian politician

Datuk Abdul Rashid Asari PSD SMS MLA
- عبدالرشيد بن عصري

Member of the Selangor State Executive Council

(Culture, Tourism, Malay Civilisation and Heritage)
- In office 14 May 2018 – 5 March 2020
- Monarch: Sharafuddin
- Menteri Besar: Azmin Ali (2018); Amirudin Shari (2018–2020)
- Preceded by: Amirudin Shari (Culture); Elizabeth Wong (Tourism); Ahmad Yunus Hairi (Malay Civilisation and Heritage)
- Succeeded by: Borhan Aman Shah (Culture, Malay Civilisation and Heritage); Hee Loy Sian (Tourism)
- Constituency: Selat Klang

Member of the Selangor State Legislative Assembly for Selat Klang
- Incumbent
- Assumed office 9 May 2018
- Preceded by: Halimah Ali (PR–PAS)
- Succeeded by: -
- Constituency: Selat Klang
- Majority: 500 (2018), 8,325 (2023)

Personal details
- Born: Abdul Rashid bin Asari; 17 October 1951 (age 74) Selangor, Federation of Malaya (now Malaysia)
- Citizenship: Malaysian
- Party: United Malays National Organisation (UMNO) (–2003); Malaysian United Indigenous Party (BERSATU) (2016–2024); Independent (2003-2016, since 2024)
- Other political affiliations: Barisan Nasional (BN) (–2003); Pakatan Harapan (PH)(2017–2020); Perikatan Nasional (PN) (2020–2024)
- Occupation: Politician

Abdul Rashid bin Asari (born 17 October 1951) is a Malaysian politician who has served as Member of the Selangor State Legislative Assembly (MLA) for Selat Klang since May 2018.

He served as Member of the Selangor State Executive Council (EXCO) in the Pakatan Harapan (PH) state administration under Menteris Besar Azmin Ali and Amirudin Shari from May 2018 to his removal from office in March 2020. He is an independent. He was a member and State Chairman of Selangor of the Malaysian United Indigenous Party (BERSATU), a component party of the Perikatan Nasional (PN) and formerly PH coalition as well as the United Malays National Organisation (UMNO), a component party of the Barisan Nasional (BN) coalition.

== Political career ==
=== Support for Menteri Besar Amirudin Shari ===
On 6 March 2024, Abdul Rashid declared support for Menteri Besar Amirudin and his state government. He became the first Opposition, PN and BERSATU MLA to do so. However, like the six Members of Parliament (MPs) who declared support for Prime Minister Anwar Ibrahim at the federal level, he pledged loyalty to BERSATU and remained its member although supporting Amirudin and his state government. He added that the royal address by Sultan Sharafuddin praising the performance of Amirudin and his state government, the silence of BERSATU on the criticisms and allegations against the Sultan as well as the wellbeing of Selat Kelang were among his reasons of doing so.

== Election results ==
Parliament of Malaysia
Year	Constituency	Candidate	Votes	Pct	Opponent(s)	Votes	Pct	Ballots cast	Majority	Turnout
2022	P097 Selayang	Abdul Rashid Asari (BERSATU)	49,154	33.93%	William Leong Jee Keen (PKR)	72,773	50.23%	144,881	23,619	79.81%
2022	P097 Selayang	Abdul Rashid Asari (BERSATU)	49,154	33.93%	Chan Wun Hoong (MCA)	19,425	13.41%	144,881	23,619	79.81%
2022	P097 Selayang	Abdul Rashid Asari (BERSATU)	49,154	33.93%	Salleh Amiruddin (PEJUANG)	2,584	1.78%	144,881	23,619	79.81%
2022	P097 Selayang	Abdul Rashid Asari (BERSATU)	49,154	33.93%	Muhammad Zaki Omar (IND)	945	0.65%	144,881	23,619	79.81%

Selangor State Legislative Assembly
Year	Constituency	Candidate	Votes	Pct	Opponent(s)	Votes	Pct	Ballots cast	Majority	Turnout
2018	N44 Selat Klang	Abdul Rashid Asari (BERSATU)	12,266	35.99%	Halimah Ali (PAS)	11,766	34.52%	34,571	500	83.55%
2018	N44 Selat Klang	Abdul Rashid Asari (BERSATU)	12,266	35.99%	Mohd Khairi Hussin (UMNO)	9,949	24.19%	34,571	500	83.55%
2018	N44 Selat Klang	Abdul Rashid Asari (BERSATU)	12,266	35.99%	Jeichandran Wadivelu (PRM)	52	0.15%	34,571	500	83.55%
2018	N44 Selat Klang	Abdul Rashid Asari (BERSATU)	12,266	35.99%	Zainal Azwar Kamaruddin (IND)	49	0.14%	34,571	500	83.55%
2023	N44 Selat Klang	Abdul Rashid Asari (BERSATU)	25,143	58.88%	Roslee Abd Hamid (UMNO)	16,818	39.38%	42,703	8,325	74.12%
2023	N44 Selat Klang	Abdul Rashid Asari (BERSATU)	25,143	58.88%	Mohamad Ezam Mohd Nor (PRM)	742	1.74%	42,703	8,325	74.12%

== Honours ==
- Malaysia
  - Commander of the Order of Loyalty to the Royal Family of Malaysia (PSD) – Datuk (2001)
- Selangor
  - Companion of the Order of the Crown of Selangor (SMS)
