= Nik Nazmi =

Malaysian politician

Nik Nazmi Nik Ahmad
- نئ نظمي نئ أحمد
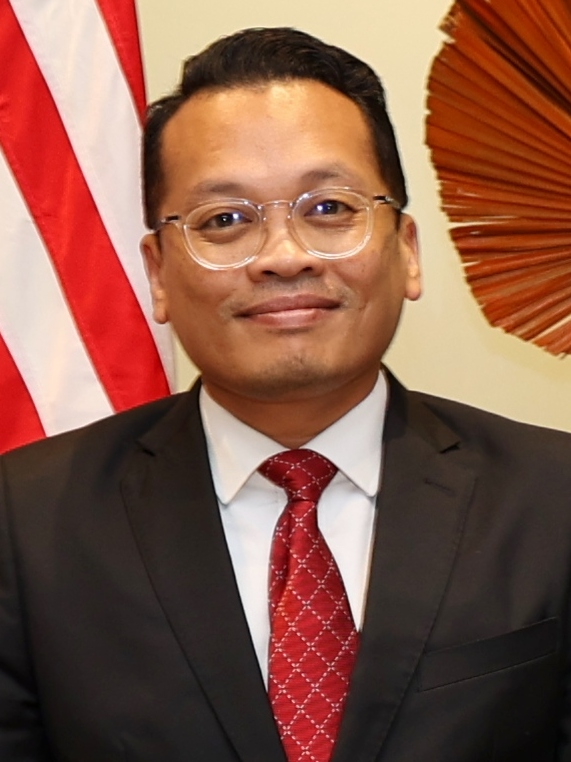
- Nazmi in 2023

Minister of Natural Resources and Environmental Sustainability
- In office 12 December 2023 – 3 July 2025
- Monarchs: Abdullah (2023–2024); Ibrahim Iskandar (2024–2025)
- Prime Minister: Anwar Ibrahim
- Deputy: Huang Tiong Sii
- Preceded by: Himself
- Succeeded by: Johari Abdul Ghani (acting); Arthur Joseph Kurup
- Constituency: Setiawangsa

Minister of Natural Resources, Energy and Climate Change
- In office 3 December 2022 – 12 December 2023
- Monarch: Abdullah
- Prime Minister: Anwar Ibrahim
- Deputy: Huang Tiong Sii
- Preceded by: Takiyuddin Hassan (Minister of Energy and Natural Resources); Tuan Ibrahim Tuan Man (Minister of Environment and Water)
- Succeeded by: Himself (Natural Resources and Environmental Sustainability); Fadillah Yusof (Minister of Energy Transition and Public Utilities)
- Constituency: Setiawangsa

Member of the Selangor State Executive Council
- In office 27 September 2014 – 13 May 2018
- Monarch: Sharafuddin
- Menteri Besar: Azmin Ali
- Portfolio: Education, Human Capital Development, Science & Technology and Innovation
- Preceded by: Halimah Ali (Education & Human Capital Development); Daroyah Alwi (Science & Technology and Innovation)
- Succeeded by: Shaharuddin Badaruddin
- Constituency: Seri Setia

Deputy Speaker of the Selangor State Legislative Assembly
- In office 21 June 2013 – 26 September 2014
- Monarch: Sharafuddin
- Menteri Besar: Khalid Ibrahim
- Preceded by: Haniza Mohamed Talha
- Succeeded by: Mohd Shafie Ngah
- Constituency: Seri Setia

Vice President of the People's Justice Party
- In office 17 July 2022 – 24 May 2025 Serving with: Amirudin Shari &; Chang Lih Kang &; Aminuddin Harun &; Awang Husaini Sahari &; Nurul Izzah Anwar &; Saraswathy Kandasami
- President: Anwar Ibrahim

3rd Youth Chief of the People's Justice Party
- In office 22 August 2014 – 16 November 2018
- President: Wan Azizah Wan Ismail
- Deputy: Afif Bahardin
- Preceded by: Shamsul Iskandar Mohd Akin
- Succeeded by: Akmal Nasrullah Mohd Nasir

Communications Director of the People's Justice Party
- In office 16 August 2010 – 11 September 2013
- President: Wan Azizah Wan Ismail
- Preceded by: Jonson Chong
- Succeeded by: Fahmi Fadzil

1st Youth Chief of Pakatan Harapan
- In office 31 October 2017 – 13 December 2018
- President: Wan Azizah Wan Ismail
- Chairman: Mahathir Mohamad
- Preceded by: Position established
- Succeeded by: Syed Saddiq

Political Secretary to the Menteri Besar of Selangor
- In office 26 March 2008 – 22 June 2010
- Menteri Besar: Khalid Ibrahim
- Preceded by: Karim Mansur
- Succeeded by: Faekah Husin

Member of the Malaysian Parliament for Setiawangsa
- In office 9 May 2018 – 18 May 2026
- Preceded by: Ahmad Fauzi Zahari (BN–UMNO)
- Majority: 14,372 (2018); 12,614 (2022)

Member of the Selangor State Legislative Assembly for Seri Setia
- In office 8 March 2008 – 9 May 2018
- Preceded by: Seripah Noli Syed Hussin (BN–UMNO)
- Succeeded by: Shaharuddin Badaruddin (PH–PKR)
- Majority: 2,863 (2008); 4,663 (2013)
- 2019–2020: Chairman the Defence and Home Affairs Select Committee

Personal details
- Born: Nik Nazmi bin Nik Ahmad; 12 January 1982 (age 44) Kuala Lumpur, Malaysia
- Citizenship: Malaysia
- Party: People's Justice Party (PKR) (2005-2026); Malaysian United Party (BERSAMA) (suspended 2026)
- Other political affiliations: Pakatan Rakyat (PR) (2008–2015); Pakatan Harapan (PH) (2015-2026)
- Spouse(s): Imaan Abdul Rahim (m. 2005; div. 2019) Noor Farah Rahim (m. 2021)
- Children: Nik Ilhan (son)
- Education: Malay College Kuala Kangsar; King's College London
- Occupation: Politician
- Website: www.niknazmi.com

Nik Nazmi bin Nik Ahmad (Jawi: نئ نظمي بن نئ أحمد; born 12 January 1982) is a Malaysian politician who served as the Minister of Natural Resources and Environmental Sustainability in the administration of Prime Minister Anwar Ibrahim from 2023 to 2025. He served as Member of Parliament (MP) for Setiawangsa from 2018 to 2026. He is a member of the Parti Bersama Malaysia (BERSAMA).

Prior to the renaming of the ministry, he previously served as the Minister of Natural Resources, Energy and Climate Change from 2022 to 2023. He also chaired the Defence and Home Affairs Select Committee from 2019 to 2020. Prior to that, Nik served as Deputy Speaker of the Selangor State Legislative Assembly from June 2013 to September 2014, of which he was also a member, representing Seri Setia from 2008 to 2018. He also simultaneously served as the Political Secretary to the Menteri Besar of Selangor, Khalid Ibrahim, from 2008 to 2010.

A former member of the People's Justice Party (PKR), a component party of the Pakatan Harapan (PH) coalition, he served as one of its vice-presidents from 2022 to 2025. He has also served as the party's 3rd Youth Chief from 2014 to 2018, and as its Communications Director from 2010 to 2013. Nik has also served as the 1st Youth Chief of PH from 2017 to 2018.

== Early life and education ==
Nik Nazmi Nik Ahmad was born in Kuala Lumpur on 12 January 1982 and his parents were originally from Kota Bharu, Kelantan. He grew up in Petaling Jaya, Selangor.

Nik Nazmi was selected to attend the Malay College Kuala Kangsar. In 2000, he received a Permodalan Nasional Berhad scholarship to do his A-Levels in Kolej Yayasan UEM, where he was elected as Student Council President. He later furthered his studies at King's College London to read law. He was active in various student bodies including UKEC, Federation of Student Islamic Societies and Labour Students. He was elected as a delegate for King's College to the National Union of Students (United Kingdom) Conference in 2005.

Nik Nazmi served his sponsor PNB for less than a year and joined PKR leader Anwar Ibrahim's office in 2006. He paid back his sponsors by taking a mortgage on a family property.

== Political career (2006–present) ==
=== Early political career (2006–2013) ===
After serving as an assistant to Anwar Ibrahim, he was nominated by Parti Keadilan Rakyat to contest the Seri Setia state seat in Selangor in the 2008 Malaysian general election. On polling day, Nik Nazmi won by a majority of 2,863 votes, defeating the incumbent Seripah Noli Syed Hussin who had won an 11,141 vote majority in the previous election. Nik Nazmi was the youngest candidate to contest a seat in the 2008 election.

He was the political secretary to the Menteri Besar of Selangor Abdul Khalid Ibrahim from March 2008 to June 2010.

Nik Nazmi was appointed Communications Director of PKR in August 2010.

In the 2013 general election, Nik Nazmi defended his Seri Setia state seat. He defeated Abdul Halim Samad of Barisan Nasional with a majority of 4,663 votes.

The Mentari project is the brainchild of Nik Nazmi. It was supposed to promote an alternative learning activity for underprivileged children living in the low-cost housing area of Desa Mentari, Petaling Jaya. Desa Mentari was chosen as a benchmark location as the children there have to endure extreme social problems, financial constraints basic security issues and even serious family problems. The Mentari Project was active in fundraising programs. It ran from 2008 until 2020.

=== Rise to prominence (2013–2018) ===
Nik Nazmi was then elected as Deputy Speaker of the Selangor State Legislative Assembly. During this time he inaugurated the Selangor Youth ADUN Program (Program ADUN Muda Selangor) which allowed students the experience of being legislators in the State Assembly.

Nik Nazmi was the first person to be charged under the Peaceful Assembly Act 2012 for failure to provide police with a 10 days notice before organising the 2013 Malaysian general election protest. If convicted under section 9(5) of the same Act, Nik Nazmi would have been disqualified from sitting as a legislator. The Court of Appeal of Malaysia later ruled that while the requirement for a 10 days notice before any peaceful assembly was lawful, criminalisation of the failure to do so was unconstitutional and acquitted Nik Nazmi

In the 2014 People's Justice Party leadership election, he was elected Youth Chief.

Nazmi was appointed the State Executive Councillor in charge of Education, Human Capital Development, Science, Technology and Innovation in 2014.

=== Member of Parliament (2018–2022) ===
For the 2018 general election, Nik Nazmi moved to contest the Setiawangsa parliamentary constituency and subsequently won the seat with a 14,372 majority.

In the 2018 People's Justice Party leadership election, he was elected as a member of the Central Leadership Council and appointed Chief Organising Secretary of the party.

In the 2022 general election, Nik Nazmi successfully retained the seat of Setiawangsa with a 12,614 vote majority. Before the election, he signed a pledge to protect Bukit Dinding from any purported development.

In the 2022 People's Justice Party leadership election, he was elected one of the party's four vice presidents with 34,496 votes, the third highest number of votes in that race.

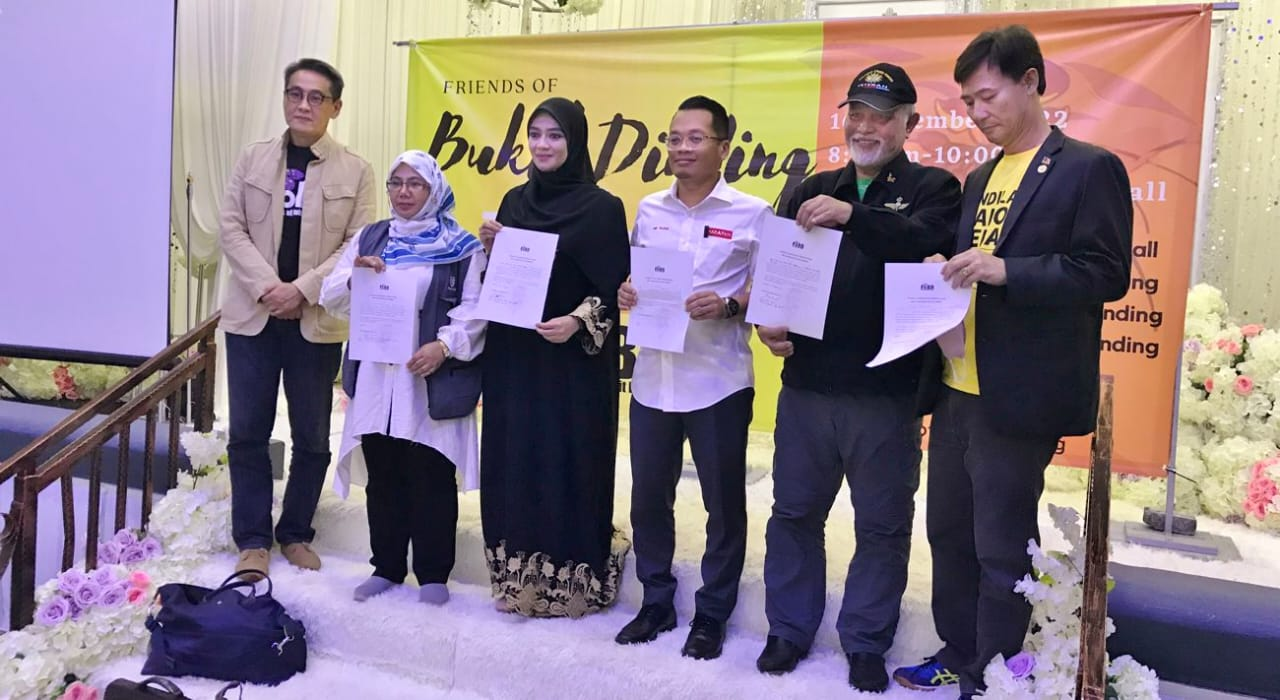
During the Bukit Dinding Townhall 2022 in Setiawangsa, 5 Candidates of P118 Setiawangsa, including Nik Nazmi, pledged against any purported development on Bukit Dinding

=== Ministership, resignation and BERSAMA's establishment (2022–present) ===
Nik Nazmi was appointed the Minister of Natural Resources, Environment and Climate Change in the Anwar Ibrahim cabinet. At the age of 40, he was the second youngest full cabinet member behind United Progressive Kinabalu Organisation (UPKO) president Ewon Benedick, who was 39.

On 12 December 2023, Prime Minister Anwar Ibrahim announced a cabinet reshuffle where the Nik Nazmi's ministry was split into two.

In April 2025, Nik Nazmi was defeated in his bid for re-election as Setiawangsa PKR division chief by Afdlin Shauki, who secured 631 votes to Nik Nazmi’s 563. The result marked a reversal of the 2022 outcome. At the time of the contest, Nik Nazmi was serving as a PKR vice president and the Minister of Natural Resources and Environment.

On May 28, 2025, Nik Nazmi, an ally of Rafizi Ramli, announced his resignation from cabinet following his defeat in the PKR vice-presidency race, effective 4 July 2025. This decision came shortly after Rafizi’s resignation from cabinet, triggered by his loss in the PKR deputy presidency election.

== Election results ==
Selangor State Legislative Assembly
| Year | Constituency | Candidate | Votes | Pct | Opponent(s) | Votes | Pct | Ballots cast | Majority | Turnout |
|---|---|---|---|---|---|---|---|---|---|---|
| 2008 | N32 Seri Setia | Nik Nazmi Nik Ahmad (PKR) | 13,838 | 55.77% | Seripah Noli Syed Hussin (UMNO) | 10,975 | 44.23% | 25,163 | 2,863 | 71.73% |
| 2013 | N32 Seri Setia | Nik Nazmi Nik Ahmad (PKR) | 18,692 | 57.13% | Abdul Halim Samad (UMNO) | 14,029 | 42.87% | 33,311 | 4,663 | 84.23% |

Parliament of Malaysia
| Year | Constituency | Candidate | Votes | Pct | Opponent(s) | Votes | Pct | Ballots cast | Majority | Turnout |
|---|---|---|---|---|---|---|---|---|---|---|
| 2018 | P118 Setiawangsa | Nik Nazmi Nik Ahmad (PKR) | 34,471 | 56.65% | Zulhasnan Rafique (UMNO) | 20,099 | 33.03% | 61,884 | 14,372 | 85.79% |
| 2018 | P118 Setiawangsa | Nik Nazmi Nik Ahmad (PKR) | 34,471 | 56.65% | Ubaid Abd Akla (PAS) | 6,282 | 10.32% | 61,884 | 14,372 | 85.79% |
| 2022 | P118 Setiawangsa | Nik Nazmi Nik Ahmad (PKR) | 34,434 | 46.06% | Nurul Fadzilah Kamarulddin (BERSATU) | 22,270 | 29.79% | 74,764 | 12,614 | 78.08% |
| 2022 | P118 Setiawangsa | Nik Nazmi Nik Ahmad (PKR) | 34,434 | 46.06% | Izudin Ishak (UMNO) | 16,333 | 21.85% | 74,764 | 12,614 | 78.08% |
| 2022 | P118 Setiawangsa | Nik Nazmi Nik Ahmad (PKR) | 34,434 | 46.06% | Bibi Sunita Sakandar Khan (PEJUANG) | 953 | 1.27% | 74,764 | 12,614 | 78.08% |
| 2022 | P118 Setiawangsa | Nik Nazmi Nik Ahmad (PKR) | 34,434 | 46.06% | Mior Rosli Mior Mohd Jaafar (IND) | 492 | 0.66% | 74,764 | 12,614 | 78.08% |
| 2022 | P118 Setiawangsa | Nik Nazmi Nik Ahmad (PKR) | 34,434 | 46.06% | Stanley Lim Yen Tiong (IND) | 282 | 0.38% | 74,764 | 12,614 | 78.08% |

== Honours ==
=== Honours of Malaysia ===
- Malaysia
  - Recipient of the 17th Yang di-Pertuan Agong Installation Medal (2024)

== Books ==
1. Saving the Planet: Climate and Environmental Lessons from Malaysia and Beyond (2025)
2. Nik Ahmad Nik Hassan Dalam Perkhidmatan Awam (2023)
3. Anak Malaysia: Sebuah Perjalanan Politik Progresif (2022)
4. Malaysian Son: A Progressive's Political Journey in the Heart of Southeast Asia (2022)
5. 9 Mei 2018: Catatan dari Garis Depan (2019)
6. 9 May 2018: Notes from the Frontline (2019)
7. In the Public Service: The Life of My Father, Nik Ahmad (2018)
8. Suara Anum: Menyusuri Arus Reformasi (2017)
9. Reformasi Perjuangan Diteruskan / The Struggle Continues 1998-2015 (co-authored with Yee Siew Meng) (2015)
10. Jiwa Merdeka: Himpunan Esei Pimpinan Muda KEADILAN (co-edited with Tricia Yeoh) (2013)
11. Spirit of Merdeka: A Collection of Essays by Young KEADILAN Leaders (co-edited with Tricia Yeoh) (2013)
12. Coming of Age: A Decade of Essays 2001-2011 (2011)
13. Mendepani Zaman: Melayu untuk Abad ke-21 (2010)
14. Moving Forward: Malays for the 21st Century (2010)

== See also ==
- Setiawangsa Rangers F.C.
- Kuala Lumpur Rangers F.C.
