= Bukit Dinding =

Hill in Kuala Lumpur, Malaysia

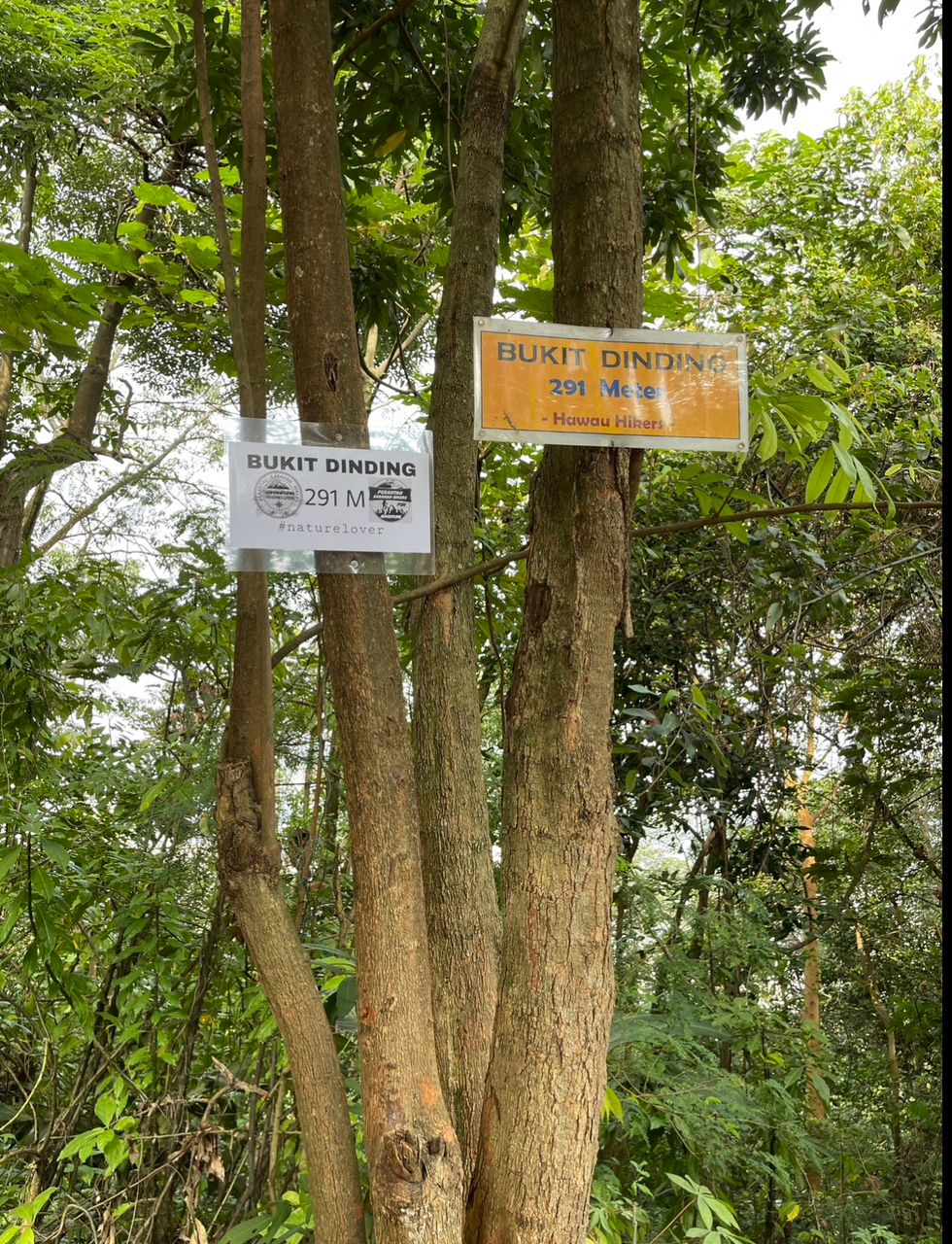

Highest point
- Elevation: 291 m (955 ft)
- Prominence: 218 m (715 ft)

Naming
- Language of name: Malay

Geography
- Location: Wangsa Maju, Setiawangsa
- State: Kuala Lumpur
- Parent range: Titiwangsa Mountains

Climbing
- Easiest route: Hike on tarmac

Bukit Dinding is a forested hill with published height of 291m in Kuala Lumpur, Malaysia, nestled in Setiawangsa and Wangsa Maju. It is officially recognized with a published height of 291 meters.

This hill is noted for its steep and challenging gradients. It functions as a natural barrier that separates the Kuala Lumpur suburbs of Wangsa Maju and Setiawangs. Locally, it is often regarded as the "last remaining green lung" amid the dense urban environment, serving as a quick yet routinely visited natural retreat.

The hill is situated near notable landmarks such as the infamous Highland Towers and Bukit Antarabangsa, both of which form part of the main Titiwangsa Mountains.

== Geology ==
Historically, Bukit Dinding was known for its waterfalls and served as a crucial watershed for rivers supplying water to Kuala Lumpur and Selangor. In the 1880s, it formed part of the Hawthornden Rubber Estate Company and Gonggang Estate. With the rapid development of Kuala Lumpur in the 1980s, the government acquired these rubber estates for residential suburb development. Renamed Wangsa Maju and Setiawangsa, the entire estate was designated for residential purposes and sold to housing developers.

The geological formation of Bukit Dinding was mapped as the oldest formation of the Kuala Lumpur area. This formation is called the "Dinding Schist" – is estimated to be 3400m thick, and consists of quartz-mica schist and quartzite with subsidiary actinolite, diopside and epidote schist and schistose conglomerate (Gobbett, 1965). In other words, it means coarse grained metamorphic rock which consists of layers of different minerals and can be split into thin irregular plates – making it unstable.

Ancient lineaments and faults existed on the hill range as a watershed to two KL rivers; Sg. Gombak and Sg. Klang. Groundwater used to be captured, stored in these ancient intersection lineaments and then transmitted downhill by linear lineaments to the rivers and faults in the area. The catchment has 2 faults and hot springs near the faults i.e. one is identified as Setapak Hot Spring.

In the 1880s, exploitations begin where this hill range was mined then transformed into a large rubber estate, featuring terraces and irrigation for rubber tree plantations.

Geological academicians believe the Dinding Schist formation and the hot springs as geological heritages that are precious and worth preserving.

== Biodiversity, Flora and Fauna ==
Bukit Dinding has traditionally been perceived as lacking biodiversity being a secondary forest, remnants of its past as a mining site and part of the Hawthornden Rubber Estate. Nevertheless, recent surveys indicate its potential transformation into a vibrant natural reserve, akin to successes seen in Taman Rimba Kiara and FRIM Kepong, which were once rubber plantations and mining sites respectively, now flourishing with diverse flora and fauna.

Initial findings have identified 175 tree species, including old rubber trees, Acacia, Atrocarpus species (Sukun and Terap), Leucaena species, and Alstonia augustifolia (Pulai). with ongoing surveys. Additionally, Bukit Dinding supports at least 88 butterfly and 43 bird species, including endangered varieties like the Black Paradise Flycatcher and Javan Myna, underscoring its conservation significance.

The area is home to the indigenous Black Bat Flower, thriving under specific environmental conditions. Bukit Dinding also have several wildlife, including the Asian Leopard Cat, snakes, lizards, civet cats, monkeys, and wild boars, often encroaching into surrounding residential areas. There are various bird species, including woodpeckers, abound, many await further identification by experts.

== Activities and attractions ==
The steep gradients of Bukit Dinding makes it particularly challenging for both hikers and mountain bikers. The trails often feature sharp inclines and declines, which can be quite demanding on physical endurance and technical skill. The elevation gain is significant over relatively short distances, contributing to its reputation as a more strenuous hiking and biking destination. The trails are rugged, with many sections that require careful navigation due to the steepness and natural obstacles.

=== Mountain Biking & Downhilling ===
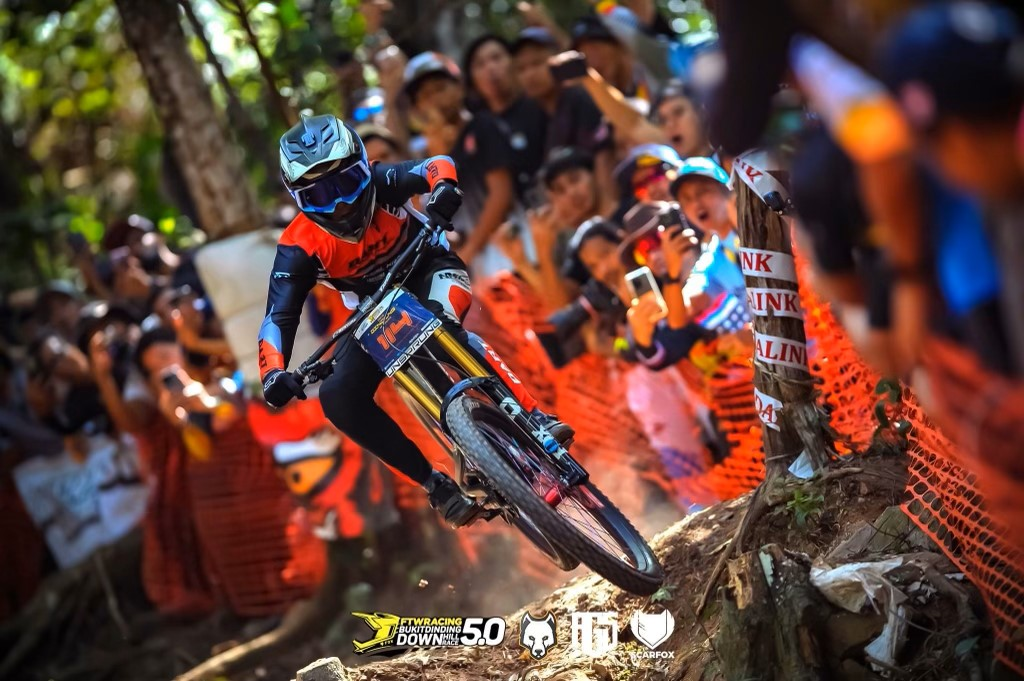
Downhilling the Rock Garden on the DH Track of Bukit Dinding

The Bukit Dinding Downhill Race is an annual mountain biking event that takes place on the challenging slopes of Bukit Dinding, located in the urban landscape of Kuala Lumpur, Malaysia. Known for its adrenaline-pumping downhill segments, the race features a route that navigates rugged terrain, sharp turns, and technical obstacles.

The race route spans various trails within Bukit Dinding, incorporating both natural and man-made features that challenge riders to showcase their speed, agility, and technical skills. The course is designed to push participants' limits while adhering to strict safety protocols. Marshals are stationed along the course to guide riders and ensure a smooth, safe flow of the event.

Typically attracting skilled mountain bikers, the event draws both local and international participants. Riders are motivated by the reputation of Bukit Dinding's challenging terrain and the high standards of organization maintained by Scarfox. The race serves as both a competitive platform and a celebration of mountain biking culture and community spirit.

The Bukit Dinding Downhill Race, often abbreviated as BDDH, has grown in popularity over the years. The following is a record of the major editions of the race:

- BDDH 1.0: 25 & 26 December 2015
- BDDH 2.0: 24 & 25 February 2018
- BDDH 3.0: 2 & 3 March 2019
- BDDH 4.0: 6, 7 & 8 March 2020
- BDDH 5.0: 4 & 5 March 2023
- BDDH 6.0: 12, 13 & 14 July 2024

Each edition of the race has contributed to the event's reputation as a premier downhill competition, continually attracting hundreds of participants from various countries.

=== Recreation & Fitness ===
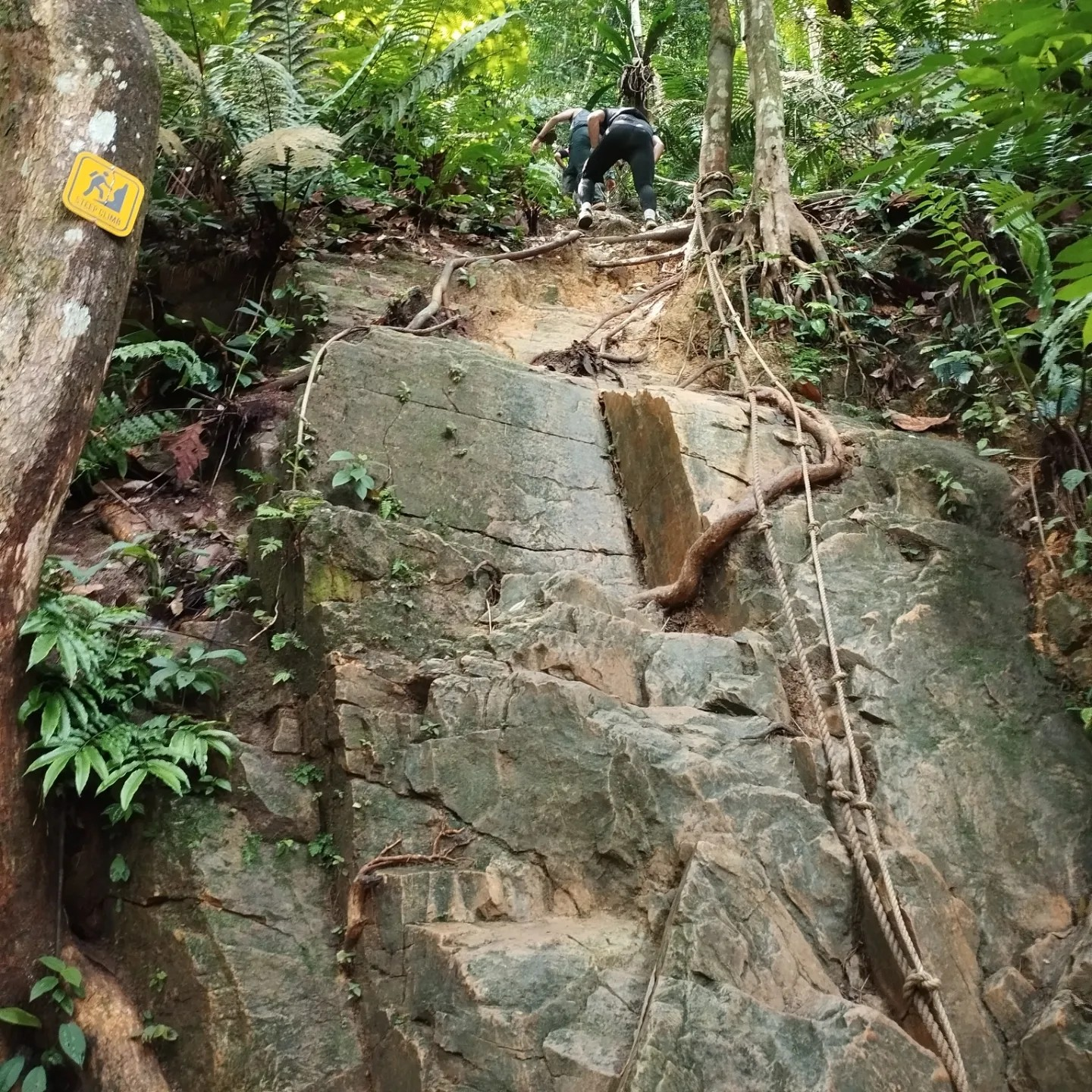
The Kazumi Trail features the opportunity to climb the Dinding Schist boulder, which is unique to Bukit Dinding

- Hiking and Trail Running: Bukit Dinding is frequented daily by hikers and trail runners. During the Malaysia Movement Control Order (MCO) in 2021, the number of visitors surged as local residents embraced the hill as a convenient open space for exercise and escape. A complete loop along the tarmac road measures approximately 5 kilometers, providing a circuit that leads to the peak and returns to the starting point.
- Training Ground: The hill serves as an ideal training ground for individuals preparing for more challenging climbs, such as Mount Kinabalu. Completing three loops of the main trail is widely regarded as an indicator of optimal fitness for tackling tougher ascents.
- Trail Network: The introduction of the additional access i.e. Kazumi trailhead, along with the organization of trail network by Friends of Bukit Dinding, has enhanced Bukit Dinding's reputation as an accessible yet challenging advanced forest trail, drawing hikers from both nearby and distant regions.

=== Outdoor Sports and Events ===
Bukit Dinding also functions as an outdoor sports venue for local clubs and groups, with organized weekly runs and other recreational activities. A highlight in the sporting calendar is the Bukit Dinding Challenge (BDC), an annual endurance running event that has become a flagship competition on the hill.

The BDC features a grueling relay, as well as 6-hour and 12-hour endurance running competitions, typically held over a 12-hour period from 6:30 AM to 6:30 PM. Major editions of the event include:

- BDC 1.0: 8 October 2017
- BDC 2.0: 3 December 2018
- BDC 3.0: 4 & 5 February 2023
- BDC 4.0: 11 & 12 May 2024

=== Conservation Effort ===
Since 2022, there has been an ongoing proposal to designate part of Bukit Dinding as a permanent forest reserve. Currently in the advocacy stage, the initiative is being championed by environmental groups actively raising public awareness, gathering community support, and engaging with government agencies to advance the proposal.

== History ==
=== 1870: A Battle Location of the Klang War (1867-1874) ===
In 1870, the surroundings of Bukit Dinding became the location of one of the battles fought in the Klang War / Selangor Civil War between Raja Abdullah, the administrator of the Klang Valley (led by Tengku Kudin and Yap Ah Loy), and Raja Mahadi, the claimant of that position (led by Syed Mashhor and Chong Chong). The full account of the battle in Bukit Dinding area is quoted here: "Mashhor himself made his way to Chong Chong's camp near Batu Ampat, and suggested an immediate counter-attack, before Ah Loy's men could consolidate their position. Chong Chong agreed with the proposal and that night led a force estimated at about 1,000 men towards Ulu Klang. Mashhor is said to have followed him with an equal force, but advancing by a different route. There is actually only one direct line of approach from Ampang to Ulu Klang, that is up the river valley. It seems probable that Mashhor took this course (he had just retreated along it), while Chong Chong made his way round through the present Gonggang and Hawthornden Estates, to the west of Bukit Dinding.

In the meantime Hiu Fatt and Tung Khoon had returned to their improvised camp at Ulu Klang. During the night they were woken by sounds of firearms and shouting, and discovered Mashhor's force in front of their position. They immediately gave orders for a direct attack to be made on the enemy. While it was in progress Chong Chong's men came up from the rear, presumably along the north flank of Bukit Dinding and down the valley of the Sungei Gisir. The Capitan China's men were thus trapped between two larger units of the enemy. Fortunately Ah Loy had decided that evening to re-inforce his troops at Ulu Klang, and had sent Chung Piang out to them with 400 men. These arrived in the middle of the conflict, and presumably in the rear of Chong Chong's encircling force. After a long struggle, in which the Capitans' losses amounted to over 40 killed and 100 wounded, Chong Chong was forced to retreat to his stockade at Ampang, "after sustaining a heavy loss".."

=== 1883: The Gonggang Mines ===
In 1883, tin mining activities flourished in a place called "Gonggang" located southwest of Bukit Dinding (around Jalan Jelatek - Kampung Datok Keramat - Setiawangsa area today). The mining areas expanded until further upstream of Sungai Bunus (around Wangsa Maju area today). This was conveyed by surveyor Mr. M'Carthy to the Superintendent of Public Works Department, Kuala Lumpur, Mr. H. F. Bellamy, when proposing a continuation of an existing road to connect to the upstream mines. Meanwhile, coffee plantations were being opened on a large scale in the same area, since the 1880s. However up until early 20th century, mining activities continued in the Gonggang area, and along Sungai Klang at the south and east side of Bukit Dinding.

=== 1888 (October): Opening of Hawthornden Estate ===
In October 1888, an estate in "Ulu Gonggang", located at Batu 5 Jalan Pahang Kuala Lumpur (north of Gonggang mining areas) was opened by J. A. Toynbee, late manager of Weld's Hill Estate under Messrs. Hill and Rathborne. It is possible that this estate expanded to Batu 6 Jalan Pahang, and named "Hawthornden Estate". It later expanded further to the east/southeast, until eventually covering most of Bukit Dinding.

=== 1965 (September): Development of Part of Hawthornden Estate ===
On 3 September 1965, the federal government announced plans for a new township in Wardieburn Estate, which includes a small part of Hawthornden Estate. This was most likely in Taman Bunga Raya area today. It was the earliest development in these areas, which did not expand further inland towards Bukit Dinding until the 1980s.

=== 1983: Hawthornden Estate New Township ===
In 1983, four rubber plantations went through compulsory government acquisition under the then-young Prime Minister, Tun Mahathir. The land acquisition was exercised to tackle the urbanization problem of that era – squatters and insufficient housing for migration of people from the rural area to Kuala Lumpur:

- Ladang Hawthornden
- Ladang Gonggang
- Ladang Kent
- Ladang Wardieburn.

All four plantations were then reclassified and rezoned as "residential lands" - these parcels of lands are then sold to developers.

The vast plantation area – then converted to suburbs - was named Wangsa Maju, the shortened version of Titiwangsa Maju.

One of the plantations – Hawthornden Rubber Estate Company, owned by famous Loke Yew – included plots of lands of the BUKIT DINDING we know today. All of the estates were rezoned as residential, including this plots of land on the hill.

On 9 December 1983, the Master Plan for a new township covering most of Hawthornden Estate, known as "Projek Pusat Pertumbuhan Bandar Baru Ladang Hawthornden", was approved. Since then, development started in the area later known as Wangsa Maju, starting with Section 1 (low-cost apartments), followed by Sections 2, 3, and 4 (mid-range apartments), and Section 5 (terrace houses, apartments, and condominiums). In that plan, part of Bukit Dinding (marked as "R-12") was already gazetted as "Residential Area". However it was not developed and remained as a forested part of the hill until today.

The incidents of notorious landslides of Highland Tower (1993) and Bukit Antarabangsa (2008) had halted slope developments throughout the country. Nevertheless, it is remained unknown why the land plots zoning for slopes of Bukit Dinding (and many other hills in the country) was never rezoned until today.

=== 1983-1995: From Gonggang Estate to Setiawangsa ===
On 22 September 1981, a Penang-based developer company, Island & Peninsular (I&P) Group Sdn Bhd took over the ownership of Gonggang Estate. By May 1983, the company's proposed layout plan for the 102-hectare Gonggang Estate site was approved. The scheme comprised well over 6,000 residential units, about 150 shophouses as well as a modern shopping and commercial centre. Building work and house sales by progress payments were planned for the end of the year 1983. Throughout the years 1983-1995, Gonggang Estate, including the foothill and mid-hill areas in the west and south-west side of Bukit Dinding, were developed in stages, and later known as "Taman Setiawangsa". The final phase of the development was the highest part of the area, named "Puncak Setiawangsa", which was completed in 1995.

== Development Plans for Bukit Dinding ==
=== 2008 (15 May): Draft of Kuala Lumpur City Plan 2020 (KLCP 2020) ===
Dewan Bandaraya Kuala Lumpur (DBKL) displayed the Draft of Kuala Lumpur City Plan 2020 (KLCP 2020). In the proposed "Environmental Protection Zone" and "Zoning" maps in that draft, most of Bukit Dinding was already planned for residential developments.

=== 2012 (28 December): Puncak Setiawangsa Landslide ===
On Friday, 28 December 2012, around 10pm, a landslide occurred in Puncak Setiawangsa, the south-west tip of Bukit Dinding. It involved failure of an engineered wall built on a 43-metre high slope in 1989-1991. The catastrophic slope failure was triggered by a rainfall that occurred 2 days prior. In the aftermath of the landslide, a residential house located at the top edge of the slope partly collapsed, and one carriageway of the dual carriageway at the bottom of the slope was closed.

The houses and shop lots at the bottom of the slope were unaffected, but inhabitants of 46 of those houses were temporarily relocated for safety concerns.

=== 2014 (September): Development on East Bukit Dinding ===
The first development project on the eastern side of Bukit Dinding was started by Kerjaya Prospek Property Sdn Bhd around September 2014. Amid opposition from the local residents, the project pressed on and was soft-launched on 12 August 2017, before finally completing in 2020. The aftermath was ongoing flooding from rain and bad drainage system, damaging homes and cars, and wild animals from the hill (especially snakes) escaping into lower homes in affected areas. The affected residents were Kelumpuk Serindit, Keramat AU, and its surroundings.

=== 2017 (12 May): Fissures in Puncak Setiawangsa ===
The cliff along Jalan 11/55C, Puncak Setiawangsa, Bukit Setiawangsa (the exact same location of the 2012 landslide) appeared to have fissures measuring half-a-metre.

=== 2017 (July): EIA Approval for Projek Wangsa Maju ===
The Department of Environment approved the Environmental Impact Assessment, EIA Report for "Projek Wangsa Maju", proposed by Nova Pesona Sdn. Bhd., the company which planned to develop a large portion of the west side of Bukit Dinding, marked as "R-12" in Bandar Baru Ladang Hawthornden Master Plan of 1983. The report identifies Bukit Dinding as a sensitive area, and even though the forest and wildlife within were considered "sparse", the project would still cause wildlife encounters particularly among residents in the east side of Bukit Dinding, and would require assistance from Perhilitan to relocate the wildlife to forests such as Ampang Forest Reserve located further to the east.

=== 2018 (30 October): Gazettement of KLCP 2020 ===
Kuala Lumpur City Plan 2020 (KLCP 2020) was finally gazetted on 30 October 2018. However, some of the contents were changed from the previous 2008 draft, without proper engagements with the public. As proposed in the 2008 draft, most of Bukit Dinding was planned for residential development. However, the remaining 70-acre portion of Bukit Dinding previously marked as "Public Open Space" was reduced to 50 acres, and labeled as "Taman Rekreasi Bukit Dinding" in the "Hierarchy Public Parks and Open Space" and "Zoning" maps.

=== 2020 (18 February): Draft of Kuala Lumpur Structure Plan 2040 (PSKL 2040) ===
In Draft of Kuala Lumpur Structure Plan 2040 (PSKL 2040), the borders of the remaining Bukit Dinding remains unchanged, and labelled as "Neighborhood Park".

== Kuala Lumpur Structure Plan & Kuala Lumpur City Plan ==
Government authorities had approved development of high-rise condominiums and a new township on Bukit Dinding, despite its Environmental Protection Zone (EPZ) status in Kuala Lumpur City Plan 2020. Bukit Dinding is a significant miss-out from the Urban Forest category. Tagged as 'Taman Rekreasi Bukit Dinding' through draft stages of KLCP2020, it is now reduced from 70 acres (KLSP2020 depiction) to 50 acres (KLCP2020 & draft KLSP2040 depiction). Meanwhile reality on the ground is that DBKL has yet to create a public park there throughout the 2000–2020 period – it remains to this day as 'vacant land', with Telekom Malaysia being the only institutional presence on the hill. Despite this lack of attention by DBKL, it has attracted a community of regular users, which grew significantly during the COVID-19 RMCO period.

== Judicial Review ==
On 28 March 2022, Director of the City Development Department, Zulkurnain Hassan, approved the proposal to build 2 blocks of 26-storey condominiums by Nova Pesona Sdn Bhd, as a continuation to the previous plans, supported by the 2017 EIA report. Local residents believed there were no sufficient notification as required by the law, learning of the development only 6 months later.

On 15 September 2022, a meeting Sesi Komunikasi Strategi Sebelum Pembinaan was called by the developer Nova Pesona Sdn Bhd, attended by 125 persons mostly residents of homes around Bukit Dinding. The developer revealed that DBKL had issued them the Development order dated 28 March 2022, with timelines of earthworks to commence at Q4 2022. The residents had openly opposed to the development stating various concerns; risks of landslide, flood, traffic and compliance concerns.

On 22 September 2022, DBKL warned developer Nova Pesona against starting work on Bukit Dinding despite their Development Order, until engagement with residents be finalized. DBKL reiterated that no work should be carried out until residents were fully-informed about the development, which had seen huge opposition from residents in the area over safety concerns.

Between 15 and 17 October 2022, four resident associations have lodged police report against the Developer Nova Pesona Sdn Bhd. feeling threatened by the purported development.

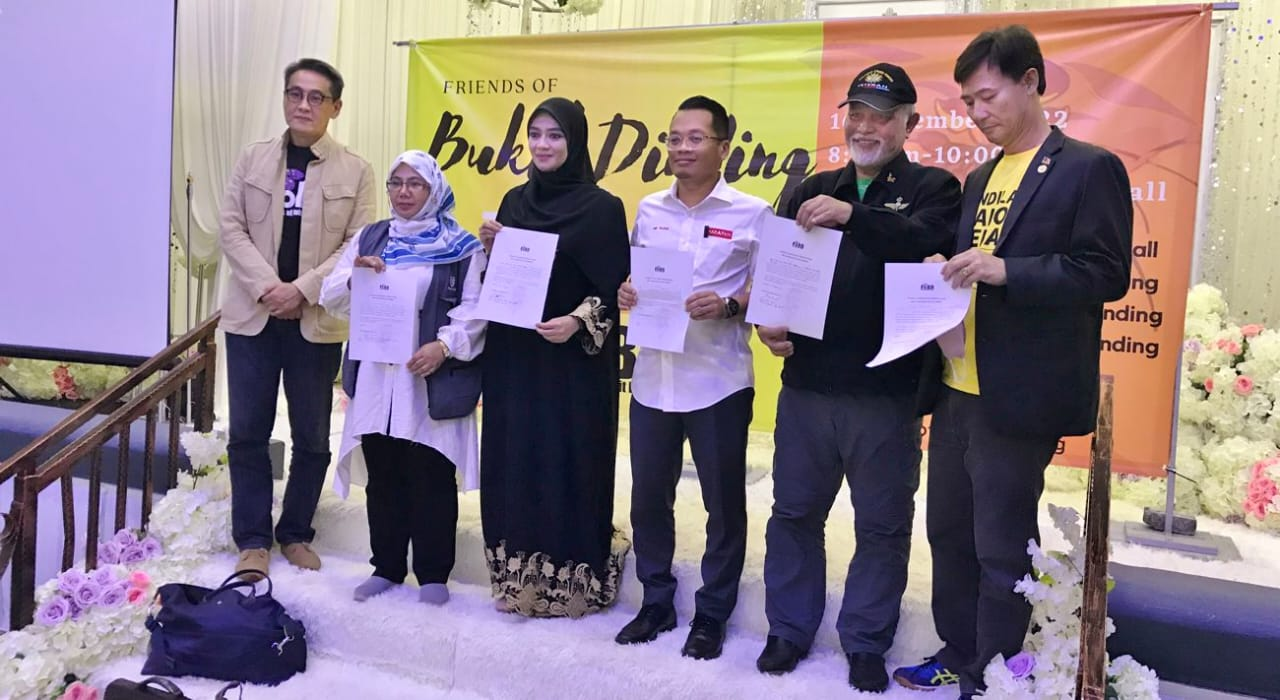
During the Bukit Dinding Townhall, 5 Candidates of P118 Setiawangsa pledged against any purported development of Bukit Dinding

On 16 November 2022, during the Townhall event by Friends of Bukit Dinding, five out six election candidates for P118 Setiawangsa showed up, which included incumbent MP Nik Nazmi Nik Ahmad (Pakatan Harapan), Nurul Fadzilah Kamaluddin (Perikatan Nasional) and Bibi Sunita Sakandar Khan (Pejuang) signed the pledge to protect Bukit Dinding against any purported development.

On 14 December 2022, a judicial review was filed by residential associations and an NGO against DBKL, for granting the Development Order to the Developer (Nova Pesona Sdn Bhd), to construct 2 blocks of high rise condominiums on part of Bukit Dinding. On 20 July 2023, the High Court granted the plaintiffs the Leave to file the Judicial review against the decision of DBKL and have also granted a Stay Order pending the disposal of this suit.
