= Selat Klang =

State constituency in Selangor, Malaysia

Selat Klang (N44)
Selangor constituency

State constituency
- Legislature: Selangor State Legislative Assembly
MLA
Abdul Rashid Asari
Independent
- Constituency created: 1974
- First contested: 1974
- Last contested: 2023

Demographics
- Electors (2023): 57,613

Selat Klang is a state constituency in Selangor, Malaysia, that has been represented in the Selangor State Legislative Assembly since 1974. It has been represented by Abdul Rashid Asari of Perikatan Nasional (PN) since 2020 and Pakatan Harapan (PH) from 2018 to 2020.

The state constituency was created in the 1974 redistribution and is mandated to return a single member to the Selangor State Legislative Assembly under the first past the post voting system.

== Demographics ==
Ethnic breakdown of Selat Klang's electorate as of 2023
1. Malay (73.9%)
2. Chinese (15.0%)
3. Indian (6.77%)
4. Other ethnicities (4.28%)

== History ==
=== Polling districts ===
According to the federal gazette issued on 30 March 2018, the Selat Klang constituency is divided into 16 polling districts.

State constituency	Polling Districts	Code	Location
Selat Klang（N44）	Sungai Udang Utara	109/44/01	SRA Darul Ulum Sungai Udang Klang
Selat Klang（N44）	Jalan Yadi	109/44/02	SK Telok Gadong
Selat Klang（N44）	Kampong Delek	109/44/03	Dewan Orang Ramai Kampung Delek
Selat Klang（N44）	Sungai Sirih	109/44/04	Balai Raya Kampung Sungai Sireh Tambahan 2
Selat Klang（N44）	Kuala Klang	109/44/05	SA Rakyat (KAFA Integrasi) Al-Hidayah Kampung Keretapi Pelabuhan Klang
Selat Klang（N44）	Sri Perantau	109/44/06	Ruang Pakir Motosikal Blok K, Anjung Seri Perantau
Selat Klang（N44）	Tanjong Klang	109/44/07	Pelantar Konkrit Bagan Hylam
Selat Klang（N44）	Sungai Lama	109/44/08	SJK (C) Sin Bin Sungai Lima Pulau Ketam
Selat Klang（N44）	Bandar Pulau Ketam	109/44/09	SJK (C) Hwa Lien Pulau Ketam
Selat Klang（N44）	Bagan Teo Chew	109/44/10	SJK (C) Keng Chee Pulau Ketam
Selat Klang（N44）	Sungai Udang Selatan	109/44/11	SMK Telok Gadong
Selat Klang（N44）	Kampong Delek Kanan	109/44/12	SRA Kampung Delek
Selat Klang（N44）	Kampong Delek Kiri	109/44/13	SR Islam Integrasi Al-Farabi
Selat Klang（N44）	Bandar Sultan Sulaiman	109/44/14	SK Pelabuhan Utara Bandar Sultan Sulaiman
Selat Klang（N44）	Kampung Raja Uda Timur	109/44/15	SK Kampung Raja Uda
Selat Klang（N44）	Kampung Raja Uda Barat	109/44/16	SRA Kampung Raja Uda

=== Representation history ===
Members of the Legislative Assembly for Selat Klang
Assembly	No	Years	Member	Party
Constituency created from Port Swettenham and Kampong Jawa
Selat Kelang
4th	N21	1974-1978	Gan Ching Yen (颜清渊)	BN (MCA)
5th	N21	1978-1982	Gan Ching Yen (颜清渊)	BN (MCA)
6th	N21	1982-1986	Ng Boon Thong @ Ng Thian Hock (黃天福)	BN (MCA)
Selat Klang
7th	N15	1986-1990	Onn Ismail	BN (UMNO)
8th	N15	1990-1995	Onn Ismail	BN (UMNO)
9th	N40	1995-1999	Onn Ismail	BN (UMNO)
10th	N40	1999-2004	Zakaria Deros	BN (UMNO)
11th	N45	2004-2008	Norliza Ahmad	BN (UMNO)
12th	N45	2008-2013	Halimah Ali	PR (PAS)
13th	N45	2013-2018	Halimah Ali	PR (PAS)
14th	N44	2018-2020	Abdul Rashid Asari	PH (BERSATU)
14th	N44	2020–2023	Abdul Rashid Asari	PN (BERSATU)
15th	N44	2023–2024	Abdul Rashid Asari	PN (BERSATU)
15th	N44	2024–present	Abdul Rashid Asari	Independent

== Election results ==
Selangor state election, 2023: Selat Klang
Party	Candidate	Votes	%	∆%
PN	Abdul Rashid Asari	25,143	58.88	▲58.88
BN	Roslee Abd Hamid	16,818	39.38	▲15.19
Parti Rakyat Malaysia	Mohamad Ezam Mohd Nor	742	1.74	▲1.74
Total valid votes		42,703	100.00	
Total rejected ballots		254		
Unreturned ballots		55		
Turnout		43,012	74.66	▼8.89
Registered electors		57,613		
Majority		8,325	19.50	▲18.03
PN gain from PKR		Swing		.

Selangor state election, 2018: Selat Klang
Party	Candidate	Votes	%	∆%
PKR	Abdul Rashid Asari	12,266	35.99	▲35.99
PAS	Halimah Ali	11,766	34.52	▼19.86
BN	Mohd Khairi Hussin	9,949	24.19	▼21.19
Parti Rakyat Malaysia	Jeichandran Wadivelu	52	0.15	▲0.15
Independent	Zainal Azwar Kamaruddin	49	0.14	▲0.14
Total valid votes		34,082	100.00	
Total rejected ballots		412		
Unreturned ballots		77		
Turnout		34,571	83.55	▼2.85
Registered electors		41,376		
Majority		500	1.47	▼7.29
PKR gain from PAS		Swing		.

Selangor state election, 2013: Selat Klang
Party	Candidate	Votes	%	∆%
PAS	Halimah Ali	17,085	54.38	▲0.97
BN	Faisal Yahya	14,331	45.62	▼0.97
Total valid votes		31,416	100.00	
Total rejected ballots		360		
Unreturned ballots		98		
Turnout		31,874	86.40	▲11.03
Registered electors		36,892		
Majority		2,754	8.76	▲1.94
PAS hold		Swing		
Source(s) "Federal Government Gazette - Notice of Contested Election, State Legislative Assembly for the State of Selangor [P.U. (B) 192/2013]" (PDF). Attorney General's Chambers of Malaysia. 26 April 2013. Archived from the original (PDF) on 2019-12-29. "Federal Government Gazette - Results of Contested Election and Statements of the Poll after the Official Addition of Votes, State Constituencies for the State of Selangor [P.U. (B) 233/2013]". Attorney General's Chambers of Malaysia. 22 May 2013. Archived from the original (PDF) on 2018-10-02.

Selangor state election, 2008: Selat Klang
Party	Candidate	Votes	%	∆%
PAS	Halimah Ali	11,437	53.41	▲19.34
BN	Norliza Ahmad	9,978	46.59	▼19.34
Total valid votes		21,415	100.00	
Total rejected ballots		334		
Unreturned ballots		38		
Turnout		21,787	75.37	▼3.69
Registered electors		28,908		
Majority		1,459	6.82	▼25.04
PAS gain from BN		Swing		?

Selangor state election, 2004: Selat Klang
Party	Candidate	Votes	%	∆%
BN	Norliza Ahmad	12,593	65.93	▲8.11
PAS	Halimah Ali	6,508	34.07	▼8.11
Total valid votes		19,101	100.00	
Total rejected ballots		343		
Unreturned ballots		3		
Turnout		19,447	71.68	▲0.73
Registered electors		27,131		
Majority		6,085	31.86	▲16.22
BN hold		Swing		

Selangor state election, 1999: Selat Klang
Party	Candidate	Votes	%	∆%
BN	Zakaria @ Zainal Md. Deros	9,970	57.82	▼22.35
PAS	Ahmad Supian	7,272	42.18	▲22.35
Total valid votes		17,242	100.00	
Total rejected ballots		308		
Unreturned ballots		11		
Turnout		17,561	70.95	▲2.13
Registered electors		24,751		
Majority		2,698	15.64	▼44.70
BN hold		Swing		

Selangor state election, 1995: Selat Klang
Party	Candidate	Votes	%	∆%
BN	Onn Ismail	12,479	80.17	▲15.31
PAS	Mohd. Ismath Habib Mohamad	3,087	19.83	▼15.31
Total valid votes		15,566	100.00	
Total rejected ballots		467		
Unreturned ballots		14		
Turnout		16,047	68.82	▼0.54
Registered electors		23,316		
Majority		9,392	60.34	▲30.62
BN hold		Swing		

Selangor state election, 1990: Selat Klang
Party	Candidate	Votes	%	∆%
BN	Onn Ismail	10,020	64.86	▼7.28
PAS	Aziz Hamzah	5,428	35.14	▲7.28
Total valid votes		15,448	100.00	
Total rejected ballots		553		
Unreturned ballots		0		
Turnout		16,001	69.36	▲4.13
Registered electors		23,070		
Majority		4,592	29.72	▼14.56
BN hold		Swing		

Selangor state election, 1986: Selat Klang
Party	Candidate	Votes	%	∆%
BN	Onn Ismail	8,851	72.14	▲12.39
PAS	Aziz Hamzah	3,418	27.86	▲27.86
Total valid votes		12,269	100.00	
Total rejected ballots		471		
Unreturned ballots		0		
Turnout		12,740	65.23	▼11.72
Registered electors		19,530		
Majority		5,433	44.28	▲24.78
BN hold		Swing		

Selangor state election, 1982: Selat Kelang
Party	Candidate	Votes	%	∆%
BN	Ng Boon Thong @ Ng Thian Hock	13,745	59.75	▲11.73
DAP	Ng Eng Heng	9,259	40.25	▼4.12
Total valid votes		23,004	100.00	
Total rejected ballots		757		
Unreturned ballots		0		
Turnout		23,761	76.95	▲0.85
Registered electors		30,877		
Majority		4,486	19.50	▲15.84
BN hold		Swing		

Selangor state election, 1978: Selat Kelang
Party	Candidate	Votes	%	∆%
BN	Gan Ching Yen	8,957	48.02	▼4.98
DAP	Chew Kim Swee	8,275	44.37	▲33.77
PAS	Mohd Zin Ibrahim	1,420	7.61	▲7.61
Total valid votes		18,652	100.00	
Total rejected ballots		818		
Unreturned ballots		0		
Turnout		19,470	76.11	▼1.25
Registered electors		25,583		
Majority		682	3.66	▼18.13
BN hold		Swing		

Selangor state election, 1974: Selat Kelang
Party	Candidate	Votes	%
BN	Gan Ching Yen	6,642	53.00
PEKEMAS	M. Nadarajah	3,912	31.22
DAP	Pan Su Peng	1,329	10.60
Independent	Sia Chong Yow	649	5.18
Total valid votes		12,532	100.00
Total rejected ballots		1,000	
Unreturned ballots		0	
Turnout		13,532	77.35
Registered electors		17,494	
Majority		2,730	21.78
This was a new constituency created.
