= Mohammad Fahmi Ngah =

Malaysian politician

Yang Berhormat Tuan Mohammad Fahmi Ngah MLA
- محمّد فهمي ڠه

Member of the Selangor State Executive Council
- Incumbent
- Assumed office 21 August 2023
- Monarch: Sharafuddin
- Menteri Besar: Amirudin Shari
- Portfolio: Islamic Affairs, Halal Industry, Digital Infrastructure & Acculturation of Science, Technology and Innovation (Note: Assumed portfolios on 23 August 2023.)
- Preceded by: Zawawi Mughni (Islamic Affairs & Halal Industry); Portfolios established (Digital Infrastructure & Acculturation of Science, Technology and Innovation)
- Constituency: Seri Setia

Member of the Selangor State Legislative Assembly for Seri Setia
- Incumbent
- Assumed office 12 August 2023
- Preceded by: Halimey Abu Bakar (PH–PKR)
- Majority: 11,331 (2023)

Personal details
- Born: Mohammad Fahmi bin Ngah
- Citizenship: Malaysian
- Party: People's Justice Party (PKR)
- Other political affiliations: Pakatan Harapan (PH)
- Education: Imperial College London (PhD)
- Occupation: Politician
- Profession: Engineer

Mohammad Fahmi bin Ngah is a Malaysian politician who has served as a Member of the Selangor State Executive Council (EXCO) in the Pakatan Harapan (PH) state administration under Menteri Besar Amirudin Shari and a Member of the Selangor State Legislative Assembly (MLA) for Seri Setia since August 2023. He is a member of the People's Justice Party (PKR), a component party of the PH coalition.

== Political career ==
=== Member of the Selangor State Executive Council (since 2023) ===
In the 2023 Selangor state election, the ruling PH and Barisan Nasional (BN) won a simple majority in the Selangor State Legislative Assembly and were reelected to power. Following that, Sungai Tua MLA Amirudin of PH was reappointed the Menteri Besar. Mohammad Fahmi was appointed the Selangor EXCO Member and given the portfolios of Islamic Affairs, Halal Industry, Digital Infrastructure, and Acculturation of Science, Technology, and Innovation (STI) by Menteri Besar Amirudin on August 21 and 23, 2023 respectively.

=== Member of the Selangor State Legislative Assembly (since 2023) ===
==== 2023 Selangor state election ====
In the 2023 Selangor state election, Mohammad Fahmi made his electoral debut after being nominated by PH to contest the Seri Setia state seat. Fahmi won the seat and was elected to the Selangor State Legislative Assembly as the Seri Setia MLA for the first term after defeating Mohd Zubir Embong of Perikatan Nasional (PN), Dobby Chew of the Malaysian United Democratic Alliance (MUDA), and independent candidate Harindran Krishnan by a majority of 11,331 votes.

== Election results ==
Selangor State Legislative Assembly
| Year | Constituency | Candidate | Votes | Pct | Opponent(s) | Votes | Pct | Ballots cast | Majority | Turnout |
|---|---|---|---|---|---|---|---|---|---|---|
| 2023 | N32 Seri Setia | Mohammad Fahmi Ngah (PKR) | 32,367 | 58.37% | Mohd Zubir Embong (PAS) | 21,036 | 37.93% | 55,453 | 11,331 | 69.00% |
| 2023 | N32 Seri Setia | Mohammad Fahmi Ngah (PKR) | 32,367 | 58.37% | Dobby Chew (MUDA) | 1,357 | 2.45% | 55,453 | 11,331 | 69.00% |
| 2023 | N32 Seri Setia | Mohammad Fahmi Ngah (PKR) | 32,367 | 58.37% | Harindran Krishnan (IND) | 693 | 1.25% | 55,453 | 11,331 | 69.00% |
