= 2018 Seri Setia by-election =

Malaysian state legislative by-election

- 8 September 2018

N32 Seri Setia seat in the Selangor State Legislative Assembly
	First party	Second party
	PH	PAS
Candidate	Halimey Abu Bakar	Halimah Ali
Party	PKR	PAS
Alliance	PH	GS
Popular vote	13,725	9,698
Percentage	58.60%	41.40%
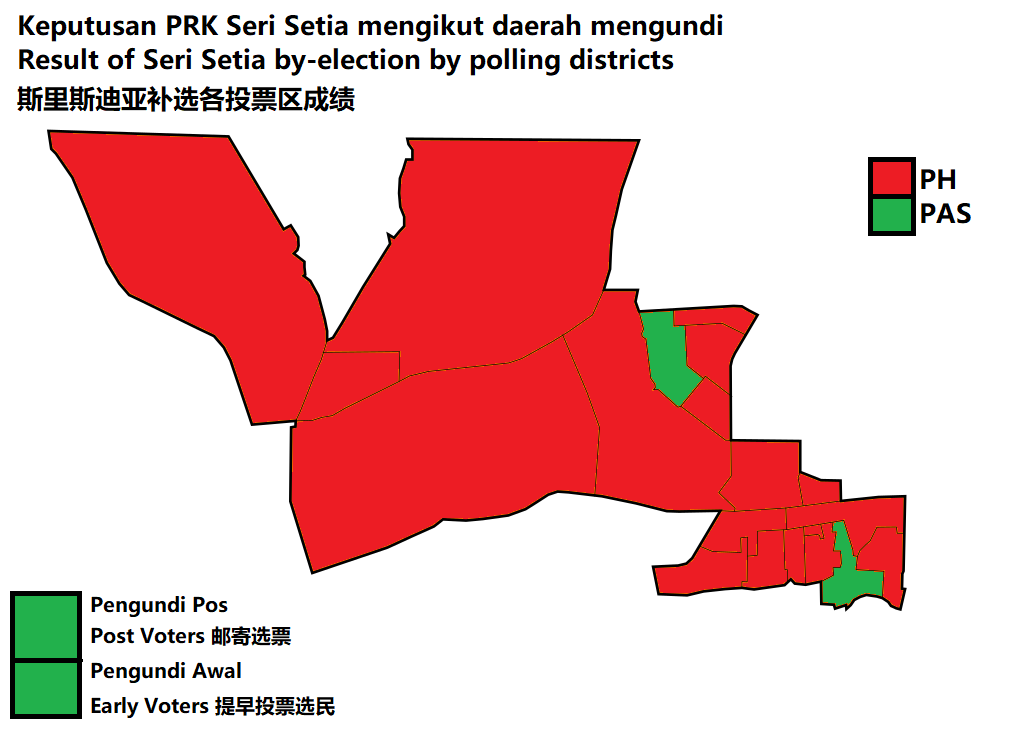
Seri Setia assemblyman before election
Shaharuddin Badaruddin (died)
Pakatan Harapan (PKR)
Elected Seri Setia assemblyman
Halimey Abu Bakar
Pakatan Harapan (PKR)

Seri Setia state constituency boundaries within the Petaling Jaya parliamentary constituency

A by-election was held on 8 September 2018 for the Selangor State Legislative Assembly seat of Seri Setia. The seat became vacant after the sudden death of the incumbent assemblyman and Selangor state executive councillor, Shaharuddin Badaruddin on 2 August 2018 from colon cancer. Shaharuddin was a member of the Parti Keadilan Rakyat or People's Justice Party (PKR), a component party of the state ruling Pakatan Harapan (PH) coalition. This was the third by-election for the Selangor State Assembly since the 2018 general election, after the Sungai Kandis and Balakong by-elections. Shaharuddin won the seat with a majority of 19,372 votes, defeating BN's Yusoff M Haniff, PAS's Mohd Ghazali Daud and independent S Vigneswaran. This by-election was held on the same day as the Balakong by-election. The nomination day was on 18 August 2018, with a 21-day campaigning period until election day.

The by-election saw a straight fight between Pakatan Harapan (PH) candidate Halimey Abu Bakar from the PKR and Pan-Malaysian Islamic Party (PAS) candidate Halimah Ali. In opposite to the Sungai Kandis and Balakong by-elections, the Barisan Nasional (BN) decided not to contest in Seri Setia. This was widely regarded as a sign of cooperation between PAS and BN, designed to ensure there is only a single opposition candidate for each by-election.

N32 Seri Setia state constituency border and the districts included within the constituency.

== Campaign ==
The by-election campaign largely focused on bread and butter issues, such as local development and the introduction of a new sales tax replacing the GST.

A case of negative campaigning marred the final days of campaign. The PAS candidate Halimah claimed that Seri Setia was too "intelligent" to vote for "local boy with an outdated mentality", insinuating about her opponent's poor origins. These remarks were criticised by the PH camp.

== Result ==
PKR's Halimey Abu Bakar, got 13,725 votes, defeating PAS’ Dr Halimah Ali who got 9,698, getting a majority of 4,027 votes thus retaining the seat for PKR and Pakatan Harapan. PAS significantly increased its share of vote, which was credited to the fact BN not contesting the seat.

Selangor state by-election, 8 September 2018: Seri Setia Upon the death of incumbent, Shaharuddin Badaruddin
Party	Candidate	Votes	%	∆%
PH	Halimey Abu Bakar	13,725	58.60	8.02
PAS	Halimah Ali	9,698	41.40	+ 31.01
Total valid votes		23,423	100.00	
Total rejected ballots		164	0.69	0.23
Unreturned ballots		28		
Turnout		23,615	44.15	40.29
Registered electors		53,492		
Majority		4,027	17.20	26.92
PH hold		Swing		19.52
Source(s) "Federal Government Gazette - Notice of Contested Election - By-election of the State Legislative Assembly of N.32 Seri Setia for the State of Selangor [P.U. (B) 499/2018]" (PDF). Attorney General's Chambers of Malaysia. 20 August 2018. "Federal Government Gazette - Results of Contested Election and Statement of the Poll after the Official Addition of Votes for the By-election of N.32 Seri Setia [P.U. (B) 523/2018]" (PDF). Attorney General's Chambers of Malaysia. 12 September 2018.

=== Results according to polling districts ===
Voting District Code	Voting District	Party
105/32/01	Glenmarie	PH
105/32/02	SS6	PAS
105/32/03	SS5D	PH
105/32/04	SS5A	PH
105/32/05	Seri Setia	PH
105/32/06	PJS5 Kampung Penaga	PH
105/32/07	PJS6/4-6/6	PH
105/32/08	PJS10/1-PJS10/6	PH
105/32/09	Rumah Pangsa Sungai Way	PH
105/32/10	PJS5/1-PJS5/12	PH
105/32/11	PJS6/1-6/3	PH
105/32/12	PJS8	PH
105/32/13	PJS10/17-PJS10/34	PH
105/32/14	SS7	PH
105/32/15	Kampung Lindungan	PH
105/32/16	PJS5/13-PJS5/30	PAS
105/32/17	Taman TTDI Jaya	PH
105/32/18	Ara Damansara	PH
105/32/19	Taman Glenmarie	PH

Voting District Code	Voting District	Party
	Post Vote	PAS
105/32/00	Early Vote	PAS

== Previous result ==
2018 Selangor state election: Seri Setia
Party	Candidate	Votes	%	±%
PH (PKR)	Shaharuddin Badaruddin	29,250	66.62	▲9.49
BN	Yusoff M Haniff	9,878	22.50	▼20.37
PAS	Mohd Ghazali Daud	4,563	10.39	N/A
Independent	Vigweswaran T Subramaniam	217	0.49	N/A
Rejected ballots		411	0.92	▼0.66
Majority		19,372	44.12	▲29.86
Turnout		44,457	84.44	▲0.21
Registered electors		52,650		
PKR hold		Swing	▲14.93	
