= Kelana Jaya (state constituency) =

State Constituency in Selangor, Malaysia, represented from 1986 to 2004

Selangor constituency

Defunct state constituency
- Legislature: Selangor State Legislative Assembly
- Constituency created: 1984
- Constituency abolished: 2004
- First contested: 1986
- Last contested: 1999

Kelana Jaya was a state constituency in Selangor, Malaysia, that was represented in the Selangor State Legislative Assembly from 1986 to 2004.

The state constituency was created in the 1984 redistribution and was mandated to return a single member to the Selangor State Legislative Assembly under the first past the post voting system.

== History ==
It was abolished in 2004 when it was redistributed.

=== Representation history ===
Members of the Legislative Assembly for Kelana Jaya
Assembly	No	Years	Member	Party
Constituency created from Sungei Way and Bukit Raja
7th	N27	1986-1990	Megat Najmuddin Megat Khas	BN (UMNO)
8th	N27	1990-1995	Megat Najmuddin Megat Khas	BN (UMNO)
9th	N33	1995-1999	Mohd Mokhtar Ahmad Dahalan	BN (UMNO)
10th	N33	1999-2004	Mohd Mokhtar Ahmad Dahalan	BN (UMNO)
Constituency abolished, split into Seri Setia, Kota Damansara and Kota Anggerik

== Election results ==
Selangor state election, 1999
Party	Candidate	Votes	%	∆%
BN	Mohd Mokhtar Ahmad Dahalan	12,741	59.62	▼25.63
PAS	Mohd Fadzli Ab. Samat	8,630	40.38	▲40.38
Total valid votes		21,371	100.00	
Total rejected ballots		440		
Unreturned ballots		28		
Turnout		21,839	68.13	▲4.18
Registered electors		32,056		
Majority		4,111	19.24	▼51.26
BN hold		Swing		

Selangor state election, 1995
Party	Candidate	Votes	%	∆%
BN	Mohd Mokhtar Ahmad Dahalan	14,486	85.25	▲26.56
S46	Mohd Nor Raha Masod	2,507	14.75	▼26.56
Total valid votes		16,993	100.00	
Total rejected ballots		435		
Unreturned ballots		70		
Turnout		17,498	63.94	▼3.07
Registered electors		27,365		
Majority		11,979	70.49	▲53.13
BN hold		Swing		

Selangor state election, 1990
Party	Candidate	Votes	%	∆%
BN	Megat Najmuddin Megat Khas	14,807	58.68	▲5.15
S46	Md. Idrus Basri	10,425	41.32	▲41.32
Total valid votes		25,232	100.00	
Total rejected ballots		541		
Unreturned ballots		64		
Turnout		25,837	67.02	▲1.53
Registered electors		38,554		
Majority		4,382	17.37	▲0.59
BN hold		Swing		

Selangor state election, 1986
Party	Candidate	Votes	%
BN	Megat Najmuddin Megat Khas	10,402	53.53
DAP	Yap Kok Heng	7,141	36.75
PAS	Yusof Abd Ghani	919	4.73
SDP	Ahmad Nor	800	4.12
NASMA	Radhakrishnan K. Pillai	170	0.87
Total valid votes		19,432	100.00
Total rejected ballots		282	
Unreturned ballots		0	
Turnout		19,714	65.48
Registered electors		30,106	
Majority		3,261	16.78
This was a new constituency created.
