= Kota Anggerik =

Electoral constituency in Selangor, Malaysia

Kota Anggerik (N40)
Selangor constituency

State constituency
- Legislature: Selangor State Legislative Assembly
MLA
Najwan Halimi
PH
- Constituency created: 2003
- First contested: 2004
- Last contested: 2023

Demographics
- Electors (2023): 95,104

Kota Anggerik is a state constituency in Selangor, Malaysia, that has been represented in the Selangor State Legislative Assembly since 2004.

The state constituency was created in the 2003 redistribution and is mandated to return a single member to the Selangor State Legislative Assembly under the first past the post voting system.

== Demographics ==
Ethnic breakdown of Kota Anggerik's electorate as of 2023
1. Malay (72.2%)
2. Chinese (17.3%)
3. Indian (8.45%)
4. Other ethnicities (2.03%)

== History ==
=== Polling districts ===
According to the gazette issued on 30 March 2018, the Kota Anggerik constituency has a total of 20 polling districts.

State constituency	Polling districts	Code	Location
Kota Anggerik（N40）	Setia Alam	108/40/01	SJK (T) North Hummock
Kota Anggerik（N40）	Monterez	108/40/02	Sekolah Seri Cahaya Shah Alam
Kota Anggerik（N40）	Shah Alam S 9	108/40/03	SK Seksyen 9 Shah Alam
Kota Anggerik（N40）	Shah Alam S 8	108/40/04	SK Bandar Anggerik Seksyen 6 Shah Alam
Kota Anggerik（N40）	Shah Alam S 1 & S 7/23 - 7/26	108/40/05	SMK Seksyen 7 Shah Alam
Kota Anggerik（N40）	Shah Alam S 6	108/40/06	SK Seksyen 6 Shah Alam
Kota Anggerik（N40）	Shah Alam S 3	108/40/07	SRA Seksyen 3 Shah Alam
Kota Anggerik（N40）	Shah Alam S 2	108/40/08	SMK Sultan Salahuddin Abdul Aziz Shah Seksyen 2 Shah Alam
Kota Anggerik（N40）	Shah Alam S 4 & S 5	108/40/09	SK Raja Muda (Integrasi) Seksyen 4 Shah Alam
Kota Anggerik（N40）	Shah Alam S 10	108/40/10	SMA Tinggi Tengku Ampuan Jemaah Seksyen 11 Shah Alam
Kota Anggerik（N40）	Shah Alam S 11, S 12 & S 14	108/40/11	Dewan Jenjarum MBSA Seksyen 11
Kota Anggerik（N40）	Shah Alam S 15, S 16	108/40/12	SMK Seksyen 16 Shah Alam
Kota Anggerik（N40）	Mutiara Bukit Raja	108/40/13	SMK Seksyen 16 Shah Alam
Kota Anggerik（N40）	Pangsapuri S7	108/40/14	SK Seksyen 7 Shah Alam
Kota Anggerik（N40）	Bukit Jelutong U8	108/40/15	SK Bukit Jelutong U8 Shah Alam
Kota Anggerik（N40）	Shah Alam S 13	108/40/16	SK Seksyen 13 Shah Alam
Kota Anggerik（N40）	Apartment S16	108/40/17	SK Shah Alam Jalan Dawai Seksyen 16
Kota Anggerik（N40）	Bukit Bandaraya	108/40/18	Dewan MBSA Bukit Bandaraya, Jalan Gunung Nuang U11/3, Seksyen U11 Shah Alam
Kota Anggerik（N40）	Bukit Subang	108/40/19	SK Taman Bukit Subang
Kota Anggerik（N40）	Shah Alam S 7/1 - 7/22	108/40/20	Dewan Melur Seksyen 7

=== Representation history ===
Members of the Legislative Assembly for Kota Anggerik
Assembly	No	Years	Member	Party
Constituency created from Batu Tiga, Meru, Paya Jaras, Bukit Lanjan, Kelana Jaya and Sungai Renggam
11th	N40	2004–2008	Ahmad Nawawi M. Zin	BN (UMNO)
12th	N40	2008–2013	Yaakob Sapari	PR (PKR)
13th	N40	2013–2018	Yaakob Sapari	PR (PKR)
14th	N40	2018–2023	Najwan Halimi	PH (PKR)
15th	N40	2023–present	Najwan Halimi	PH (PKR)

== Election results ==
Selangor state election, 2023: Kota Anggerik
Party	Candidate	Votes	%	∆%
PH	Najwan Halimi	38,470	56.00	▲56.00
PN	Mohamed Sukri Omar	27,636	40.20	▲40.20
MUDA	Azad Akbar Khan	2,631	3.80	▲3.80
Total valid votes		68,737	100	
Total rejected ballots		304		
Unreturned ballots		114		
Turnout		69,155	72.72	▼15.83
Registered electors		95,104		
Majority		10,834	15.80	▼21.32
PH hold		Swing		

Selangor state election, 2018: Kota Anggerik
Party	Candidate	Votes	%	∆%
PKR	Najwan Halimi	26,947	58.82	▲4.29
PAS	Ahmad Dusuki Abd Rani	9,943	21.70	▲21.70
BN	Jumaeah Masdi	8,924	19.48	▼25.70
Total valid votes		45,814	100.00	
Total rejected ballots		279		
Unreturned ballots		203		
Turnout		46,296	88.55	▼0.14
Registered electors		52,282		
Majority		17,004	37.12	▼27.77
PKR hold		Swing		

Selangor state election, 2013: Kota Anggerik
Party	Candidate	Votes	%	∆%
PKR	Yaakob Sapari	26,261	54.53	▲0.77
BN	Mohd Yusof Din	21,758	45.18	▼1.06
Independent	Eriq Faisal Rusli	136	0.28	▲0.28
Total valid votes		48,155	100.00	
Total rejected ballots		470		
Unreturned ballots		113		
Turnout		48,738	88.69	▲11.09
Registered electors		54,952		
Majority		4,503	9.35	▲1.83
PKR hold		Swing		
Source(s) "Federal Government Gazette - Notice of Contested Election, State Legislative Assembly for the State of Selangor [P.U. (B) 192/2013]" (PDF). Attorney General's Chambers of Malaysia. 26 April 2013. Archived from the original (PDF) on 2019-12-29. "Federal Government Gazette - Results of Contested Election and Statements of the Poll after the Official Addition of Votes, State Constituencies for the State of Selangor [P.U. (B) 233/2013]" (PDF). Attorney General's Chambers of Malaysia. 22 May 2013. Archived from the original (PDF) on 2018-10-02.

Selangor state election, 2008: Kota Anggerik
Party	Candidate	Votes	%	∆%
PKR	Yaakob Sapari	15,738	53.76	▲19.84
BN	Ahmad Nawawi M. Zin	13,538	46.24	▼19.84
Total valid votes		29,276	100.00	
Total rejected ballots		383		
Unreturned ballots		171		
Turnout		29,830	77.60	▲1.48
Registered electors		38,442		
Majority		2,200	7.52	▼24.64
PKR gain from BN		Swing		?

Selangor state election, 2004: Kota Anggerik
Party	Candidate	Votes	%
BN	Ahmad Nawawi M. Zin	16,853	66.08
PKR	Annette Syed Mohamed @ Animah Annette Ferrar	8,652	33.92
Total valid votes		25,505	100.00
Total rejected ballots		320	
Unreturned ballots		207	
Turnout		26,032	76.12
Registered electors		34,198	
Majority		8,201	32.16
This was a new constituency created.
