= Seri Setia (state constituency) =

Malaysian state constituency

Seri Setia (N32)
Selangor constituency

State constituency
- Legislature: Selangor State Legislative Assembly
MLA
Mohammad Fahmi Ngah
PH
- Constituency created: 2003
- First contested: 2004
- Last contested: 2023

Demographics
- Electors (2023): 80,371

Seri Setia is a state constituency in Selangor, Malaysia, that has been represented in the Selangor State Legislative Assembly since 2004.

The state constituency was created in the 2003 redistribution and is mandated to return a single member to the Selangor State Legislative Assembly under the first past the post voting system.

== Demographics ==
Ethnic breakdown of Seri Setia's electorate as of 2023
1. Malay (52.0%)
2. Indian (23.4%)
3. Chinese (20.6%)
4. Other ethnicities (3.95%)

== History ==
=== Polling districts ===
According to the federal gazette issued on 30 March 2018, the Seri Setia constituency is divided into 20 polling districts.

State constituency	Polling Districts	Code	Location
Seri Setia (N32）	Glenmarie	105/32/01	Politeknik Sultan Salahuddin Abdul Aziz Shah
Seri Setia (N32）	SS 6	105/32/02	Dewan Masyarakat SS 6/1
Seri Setia (N32）	SS 5d	105/32/03	SK Kelana Jaya 1; SK Kelana Jaya 2
Seri Setia (N32）	SS 5b & 5c	105/32/04	SK Sri Kelana Jaya
Seri Setia (N32）	SS 5a	105/32/05	SA Rakyat (KAFA) Integrasi Ehsaniah
Seri Setia (N32）	Seri Setia	105/32/06	SK Sungai Way
Seri Setia (N32）	PJS 5 Kampung Penanga	105/32/07	SRA Kampung Medan
Seri Setia (N32）	PJS 6/4 - PJS 6/6	105/32/08	SJK (T) Seaport
Seri Setia (N32）	PJS 10/1 - PJS 10/16	105/32/09	SK Kampung Lindungan
Seri Setia (N32）	Rumah Pangsa Sungai Way	105/32/10	SK Sungai Way
Seri Setia (N32）	PJS 5/1 - PJS 5/12	105/32/11	Kolej Tingkatan 6 PJS 5/26 Petaling Jaya
Seri Setia (N32）	PJS 6/1 - PJS 6/3	105/32/12	Sekolah KAFA Integrasi Al-Islamiah Kampung Lindungan
Seri Setia (N32）	PJS 8	105/32/13	Dewan Seberguna Dato' Hormat
Seri Setia (N32）	PJS 10/17 - PJS 10/34	105/32/14	SK Kampung Lindungan
Seri Setia (N32）	SS 7	105/32/15	Dewan Sri Kelana, Komplek Sukan Kelana Jaya
Seri Setia (N32）	Kampung Lindungan	105/32/16	Dewan Komuniti Jalan PJS 6
Seri Setia (N32）	PJS 5/13 - PJS 5/30	105/32/17	Kolej Tingkatan 6 PJS 5/26 Petaling Jaya
Seri Setia (N32）	Taman Ttdi Jaya	105/32/18	SK Taman Tun Dr. Ismail Jaya Shah Alam
Seri Setia (N32）	Ara Damansara	105/32/19	SMK Lembah Subang Kelana Jaya
Seri Setia (N32）	Taman Glenmarie	105/32/20	Anjung Bestari Politeknik Sultan Salahuddin Abdul Aziz Shah

=== Representation history ===
Members of the Legislative Assembly for Seri Setia
Assembly	No	Years	Member	Party
Constituency created from Kelana Jaya
11th	N32	2004–2008	Seripah Noli Syed Hussin	BN (UMNO)
12th	N32	2008–2013	Nik Nazmi Nik Ahmad	PR (PKR)
13th	N32	2013–2015	Nik Nazmi Nik Ahmad	PR (PKR)
13th	N32	2015–2018	Nik Nazmi Nik Ahmad	PH (PKR)
14th	N32	2018	Shaharuddin Badaruddin	PH (PKR)
14th	N32	2018–2023	Halimey Abu Bakar	PH (PKR)
15th	N32	2023–present	Mohammad Fahmi Ngah	PH (PKR)

== Election results ==
Selangor state election, 2023
Party	Candidate	Votes	%	∆%
PH	Mohammad Fahmi Ngah	32,367	58.37	▼0.23
PN	Mohd Zubir Embong	21,036	37.93	▲37.93
MUDA	Dobby Chew Chuan Yang	1,357	2.45	▲2.45
Independent	Harindran Krishnan	693	1.25	▲1.25
Total valid votes		55,453	100.00	
Total rejected ballots		404		
Unreturned ballots		89		
Turnout		55,946	69.61	▲25.46
Registered electors		80,371		
Majority		11,331	20.44	▲3.24
PH hold		Swing		

Selangor state by-election, 8 September 2018 Upon the death of incumbent, Shaharuddin Badaruddin
Party	Candidate	Votes	%	∆%
PH	Halimey Abu Bakar	13,725	58.60	▼8.02
PAS	Halimah Ali	9,698	41.40	▲31.01
Total valid votes		23,423	100.00	
Total rejected ballots		164	0.69	
Unreturned ballots		28		
Turnout		23,615	44.15	▼40.29
Registered electors		53,492		
Majority		4,027	17.20	▼26.92
PH hold		Swing		
Source(s) "Federal Government Gazette - Notice of Contested Election - By-election of the State Legislative Assembly of N.32 Seri Setia for the State of Selangor [P.U. (B) 499/2018]" (PDF). Attorney General's Chambers of Malaysia. 20 August 2018. "Federal Government Gazette - Results of Contested Election and Statement of the Poll after the Official Addition of Votes for the By-election of N.32 Seri Setia [P.U. (B) 523/2018]" (PDF). Attorney General's Chambers of Malaysia. 12 September 2018.

Selangor state election, 2018
Party	Candidate	Votes	%	∆%
PKR	Shaharuddin Badaruddin	29,250	66.62	▲9.49
BN	Yusoff M Haniff	9,878	22.50	▼20.37
PAS	Mohd Ghazali Daud	4,563	10.39	▲10.39
Independent	Vigweswaran T Subramaniam	217	0.49	▲0.49
Total valid votes		43,908	100.00	
Total rejected ballots		411	0.92	
Unreturned ballots		138		
Turnout		44,457	84.44	▲0.21
Registered electors		52,650		
Majority		19,372	44.12	▲29.86
PKR hold		Swing		

Selangor state election, 2013
Party	Candidate	Votes	%	∆%
PKR	Nik Nazmi Nik Ahmad	18,692	57.13	▲1.36
BN	Abdul Halim Samad	14,029	42.87	▼1.36
Total valid votes		32,721	100.00	
Total rejected ballots		516		
Unreturned ballots		74		
Turnout		33,311	84.23	▲12.50
Registered electors		39,548		
Majority		4,663	14.26	▲2.72
PKR hold		Swing		
Source(s) "Federal Government Gazette - Notice of Contested Election, State Legislative Assembly for the State of Selangor [P.U. (B) 192/2013]" (PDF). Attorney General's Chambers of Malaysia. 26 April 2013. Archived from the original (PDF) on 2019-12-29. "Federal Government Gazette - Results of Contested Election and Statements of the Poll after the Official Addition of Votes, State Constituencies for the State of Selangor [P.U. (B) 233/2013]". Attorney General's Chambers of Malaysia. 22 May 2013. Archived from the original (PDF) on 2018-10-02.

Selangor state election, 2008
Party	Candidate	Votes	%	∆%
PKR	Nik Nazmi Nik Ahmad	13,838	55.77	▲55.77
BN	Seripah Noli Syed Hussin	10,975	44.23	▼30.33
Total valid votes		24,813	100.00	
Total rejected ballots		302		
Unreturned ballots		48		
Turnout		25,163	71.73	▲3.44
Registered electors		35,079		
Majority		2,863	11.54	▼37.58
PKR gain from BN		Swing		?

Selangor state election, 2004
Party	Candidate	Votes	%
BN	Seripah Noli Syed Hussin	16,911	74.56
PAS	Mastura Muhamad	5,770	25.44
Total valid votes		22,681	100.00
Total rejected ballots		433	
Unreturned ballots		45	
Turnout		23,159	68.29
Registered electors		33,912	
Majority		11,141	49.12
This was a new constituency created.
