= Liew Yuen Keong =

Malaysian politician

Yang Berbahagia Dato' Liew Yuen Keong DSSA SMS
- 廖润强

Member of the Selangor State Legislative Assembly for Seri Kembangan
- In office 25 April 1995 – 8 March 2008
- Preceded by: constituency created from Serdang
- Succeeded by: Ean Yong Hian Wah (PR–DAP)
- Majority: 2,968 (1995); 4,774 (1999); 7,763 (2004)

Personal details
- Born: 12 December 1960 (age 65) Selangor, Federation of Malaya
- Party: Malaysian Chinese Association (MCA)
- Other political affiliations: Barisan Nasional (BN)
- Occupation: Politician

Liew Yuen Keong (born 12 December 1960) is a Malaysian politician who served as Member of the Selangor State Legislative Assembly (MLA) for Seri Kembangan from April 1995 to March 2008. He is a member of Malaysian Chinese Association (MCA), a component party of Barisan Nasional (BN) coalitions.

== Election results ==
Selangor State Legislative Assembly
Year	Constituency	Candidate	Votes	Pct	Opponent(s)	Votes	Pct	Ballots cast	Majority	Turnout
1995	N30 Sri Kembangan	Liew Yuen Keong (MCA)	9,606	59.14%	Lim Soon Hong (DAP)	6,638	40.86%	16,543	2,968	80.35%
1999	N30 Sri Kembangan	Liew Yuen Keong (MCA)	11,869	62.59%	Wong Kok Yew (DAP)	7,095	37.41%	19,298	4,774	79.00%
2004	N28 Seri Kembangan	Liew Yuen Keong (MCA)	14,379	68.49%	Lee Yee Lian (DAP)	6,616	31.51%	21,351	7,763	76.70%
2008	N28 Seri Kembangan	Liew Yuen Keong (MCA)	8,597	34.76%	Ean Yong Hian Wah (DAP)	15,841	64.05%	25,127	7,244	82.94%
2008	N28 Seri Kembangan	Liew Yuen Keong (MCA)	8,597	34.76%	Wong Kok Yew (IND)	294	1.19%	25,127	7,244	82.94%

Parliament of Malaysia
Year	Constituency	Candidate	Votes	Pct	Opponent(s)	Votes	Pct	Ballots cast	Majority	Turnout
2018	P102 Bangi	Liew Yuen Keong (MCA)	19,766	12.64%	Ong Kian Ming (DAP)	102,557	65.60%	157,933	68,768	88.33%
2018	P102 Bangi	Liew Yuen Keong (MCA)	19,766	12.64%	Mohd Shafie Ngah (PAS)	33,789	21.61%	157,933	68,768	88.33%
2018	P102 Bangi	Liew Yuen Keong (MCA)	19,766	12.64%	Dennis Wan Jinn Woei (PRM)	215	0.14%	157,933	68,768	88.33%

== Honours ==
- Selangor
  - Knight Companion of the Order of Sultan Salahuddin Abdul Aziz Shah (DSSA) – Dato' (2001)
  - Companion of the Order of the Crown of Selangor (SMS) (1999)
