= Wong Siew Ki =

Malaysian politician

Yang Berhormat Puan Wong Siew Ki MLA
- 王诗棋

State Publicity Secretary of the Democratic Action Party of Selangor
- Incumbent
- Assumed office 14 November 2021
- Assistant: Teh Hoong Keat (2021–2024); Pang Sock Tao (since 2024)
- Secretary-General: Lim Guan Eng (2021–2022); Anthony Loke Siew Fook (since 2022)
- State Chairman: Gobind Singh Deo (2021–2024); Ng Sze Han (since 2024)
- Preceded by: Tiew Wey Kheng

Member of the Selangor State Legislative Assembly for Seri Kembangan
- Incumbent
- Assumed office 12 August 2023
- Preceded by: Ean Yong Hian Wah (PH–DAP)
- Majority: 36,160 (2023)

Member of the Selangor State Legislative Assembly for Balakong
- In office 8 September 2018 – 12 August 2023
- Preceded by: Eddie Ng Tien Chee (PH–DAP)
- Succeeded by: Wayne Ong Chun Wei (PH–DAP)
- Majority: 18,533 (2018)

Personal details
- Born: 17 May 1986 (age 40) Ipoh, Perak, Malaysia
- Citizenship: Malaysian
- Party: Democratic Action Party (DAP) (since 2014)
- Other political affiliations: Pakatan Rakyat (PR) (2014–2015); Pakatan Harapan (PH) (since 2015)
- Education: Universiti Putra Malaysia
- Occupation: Politician
- Website: dewan.selangor.gov.my/adun/profile/n27/

Wong Siew Ki (王诗棋; pinyin: Wáng shī qí; born 17 May 1986), is a Malaysian politician who has served as Member of the Selangor State Legislative Assembly (MLA) for Seri Kembangan since August 2023. She served as the MLA for Balakong from September 2018 to August 2023. She is a member of the Democratic Action Party (DAP), a component party of the Pakatan Harapan (PH) and formerly Pakatan Rakyat (PR) coalitions. She has also served as State Publicity Secretary of DAP of Selangor since November 2021. She previously served as Member of the Subang Jaya Municipal Council (MBSJ), State Youth Chief of DAP Selangor or known as State Chief of the DAP youth wing namely the DAP Socialist Youth (DAPSY) of Selangor, National Assistant Publicity Secretary of DAPSY and Chief of DAPSY of Serdang.

== Early life ==
Wong was born to Wong Fook Keong and Chin Kooi Seng as their second daughter on 17 May 1986. She grew up in Ipoh, the capital city of Perak, Malaysia.

Wong received her primary, secondary and tertiary educations at Sekolah Jenis Kebangsaan (Cina) Poi Lam Ipoh, Sekolah Menengah Jenis Kebangsaan Poi Lam Ipoh, Sekolah Menengah Kebangsaan Methodist (ACS) Ipoh and Universiti Putra Malaysia (UPM). In 2009, she graduated from UPM with a Bachelor of Arts (Foreign Language) major in Chinese Literature. In 2020, she graduated with Master of Arts (Chinese Literature).

== Early career ==
Before becoming a politician, Wong was a blogger writing on politics and current issues. She also made various documentaries. She was also the President of UPM Chinese Society during her university life in 2008. She was actively involved in student movements. After graduating from UPM, she wrote articles about her opinions towards social movements through her blog using her pen name “Tian Fei”. In 2012, she became the director and producer of the documentary about the injustice case of Teoh Beng Hock namely “Zhui Luo/The Fallen” besides working on a full-time basis in the political field, which is quite different compared to other activists and politicians. In 2013, 2014 and 2016, she also directed and produced documentaries namely “Inheritance” (heritage preservation), “Migration” (anti-Lynas movement) and “Instigation” (Sedition Act). In 2013, she and her friends founded Dapur Jalanan Kuala Lumpur in order to help the urban needy and encourage youngsters to actively involve themselves in social caring activities. Within the same year, in line with the 2013 general election, she commenced her political life by becoming the political secretary to Member of the Selangor State Executive Council (EXCO) and MLA for Seri Kembangan Ean Yong Hian Wah.

== Political career ==
=== City councilor and political secretary to MLA ===
In 2013, Ean Yong invited Wong to serve as his political secretary. She joined DAP in 2014. She was appointed and sworn in as the MBSJ Member in 2016. During her term in the position, she actively promoted recycling activities.

She was elected as the Balakong MLA during her term as Serdang DAPSY Chief on 8 September 2018. In November 2018, she led a team comprising her fellow Bandar Utama MLA Jamaliah Jamaluddin to contest the Selangor DAPSY election, the team was elected to the Selangor DAPSY state committee and she was appointed the State Youth Chief of DAP Selangor or known as the Selangor State DAPSY Chief. On 14 November 2021, she contested the Selangor DAP election, she gained 562 votes from the delegates and was ranked the 9th highest among the candidates. Therefore, she was elected to the Selangor DAP state committee as one of the 15 candidates with most votes. After being elected, she was appointed the Publicity Secretary in the new committee line-up.

=== Selangor State Legislative Assembly ===
==== Election ====
2018 Balakong by-election

Wong was elected to the Selangor State Legislative Assembly in the Balakong by-election held on 8 September 2018, 4 months after the 2018 Selangor state election. She was nominated as candidate on 14 August 2018. The seat became vacant after the death of the incumbent MLA Eddie Ng Tien Chee in a car accident on the Cheras–Kajang Expressway on 20 July 2018. This was the second casual vacancy in the assembly since the 2018 general election after that of the Sungai Kandis state seats. The Balakong by-election was also held alongside the Seri Setia by-election on the same day. The by-election saw a straight fight between PH and BN as PAS had decided against contesting. She defeated Tan Chee Teong from MCA by a majority of 18,533 votes. The by-election's turnout rate was noted to be low compared to the 2018 general election and Sungai Kandis by-election, at only 42.97%.

2023

In the 2023 election, Wong was moved to contest Seri Kembangan from Balakong, replacing the incumbent MLA Ean Yong Hian Wah, who chose not to seek reelection. She was reelected to the state legislative assembly by a majority of 36,160 votes.

== Election results ==
Selangor State Legislative Assembly
Year	Constituency	Candidate	Votes	Pct	Opponent(s)	Votes	Pct	Ballots cast	Majority	Turnout
2018	N27 Balakong	Wong Siew Ki (DAP)	22,508	84.99%	Tan Chee Teong (MCA)	3,975	15.01%	26,734	18,533	42.97%
2023	N28 Seri Kembangan	Wong Siew Ki (DAP)	39,684	88.90%	Chen Win Keong (BERSATU)	3,524	7.89%	44,637	36,160	71.07%
2023	N28 Seri Kembangan	Wong Siew Ki (DAP)	39,684	88.90%	Wong Jung Lik (IND)	1,229	2.75%	44,637	36,160	71.07%

== Books published ==
- 从〈午夜香吻〉到〈麻坡的华语〉：大马华语流行歌曲中的身份建构

== Documentaries and articles ==
- Jatuh / 坠落（2012）：Dokumentari berkenaan Kes Kematian Teoh Beng Hock 赵明福冤案纪录片https://www.youtube.com/watch?v=2Yq4rLg9TWo&t=812s
- Warisan / 传承（2014）：Dokumentari berkenaan bangunan warisan 古迹保存纪录片 https://www.youtube.com/watch?v=H2zfXD9dHQc
- Hijrah / 迁移（2014）：Dokumentari berkenaan Usaha Anti-Lynas 反莱纳斯工厂活动纪录片 https://www.youtube.com/watch?v=t92H60YAECI
- Hasut / 煽动（2016）：Dokumentari Berkenaan Akta Hasutan 煽动法令纪录片 https://www.youtube.com/watch?v=TUeCZaHxjZs
