= Bangi (federal constituency) =

Federal constituency of Selangor, Malaysia

Bangi (P102)
Selangor constituency

Federal constituency
- Legislature: Dewan Rakyat
- MP: Syahredzan Johan; PH
- Constituency created: 2018
- First contested: 2018
- Last contested: 2022

Demographics
- Population (2020): 687,609
- Electors (2023): 311,469
- Area (km²): 184
- Pop. density (per km²): 3,737

Bangi is a federal constituency in Hulu Langat District, Selangor, Malaysia, that has been represented in the Dewan Rakyat since 2018.

The federal constituency was created in the 2018 redistribution and is mandated to return a single member to the Dewan Rakyat under the first past the post voting system.

With a total population of nearly 700,000, Bangi is the most populous parliamentary constituency in Malaysia.

== Demographics ==
Ethnic breakdown of Bangi's electorate as of 2022
1. Malay (48.6%)
2. Chinese (36.8%)
3. Indian (11.1%)
4. Other ethnicities (3.44%)
Age breakdown of Bangi's electorate as of 2022
1. 18-20 (8.61%)
2. 21-29 (25.8%)
3. 30-39 (21.6%)
4. 40-49 (16.6%)
5. 50-59 (13.7%)
6. 60-69 (9.18%)
7. 70-79 (3.47%)
8. 80-89 (0.83%)
9. above 90 (0.11%)
Gender breakdown of Bangi's electorate as of 2022
1. Male (49.5%)
2. Female (50.5%)

According to the August 2022 Electoral Roll used for the 2022 Malaysian general election, the Bangi constituency has 303,430 registered voters, of whom 48.6% are Malay, 36.8% are Chinese, 11.1% are Indian, and 3.44% are from other ethnic groups. In the 2018 general election, the constituency had 178,790 registered voters. The 2022 general election saw an increase of 124,640 voters, a 69.71% increase. In terms of percentage of voters by ethnic group, the Malay population increased by 0.12%, the Chinese decreased by 2.15%, the Indian population decreased by 0.02%, and the other ethnic groups increased by 2.00%.

Change of electorate in Bangi (by percentage)
Election	Electorate				Voters	Change
Election	Malay	Chinese	Indian	Other	Voters	Change
2022	48.6	36.8	11.1	3.44	303,430	+69.71%
2018	48.48	38.95	11.12	1.44	178,790	－

== History ==
=== Polling districts ===
According to the federal gazette issued on 18 July 2023, the Bangi constituency is divided into 62 polling districts.

State constituency	Polling districts	Code	Location
Kajang (N25)	Sungai Sekamat	102/25/01	SK Seri Sekamat; SRA Sungai Sekamat
Kajang (N25)	Saujana Impian	102/25/02	SK Saujana Impian
Kajang (N25)	Taman Mesra	102/25/03	Dewan Besar, SMA Persekutuan Kajang
Kajang (N25)	Sungai Kantan	102/25/04	SK Sungai Kantan
Kajang (N25)	Taman Kajang Baharu	102/25/05	SMK Tinggi Kajang
Kajang (N25)	Kajang	102/25/06	SMK Convent
Kajang (N25)	Taman Delima	102/25/07	SMK Saujana Impian
Kajang (N25)	Bandar Kajang	102/25/08	SK Kajang
Kajang (N25)	Bandar Sungai Long	102/25/09	SMK Bandar Baru Sungai Long; SJK (C) Bandar Sungai Long
Kajang (N25)	Bandar Mahkota Cheras	102/25/10	SJK (T) Bandar Mahkota Cheras
Kajang (N25)	Taman Rakan	102/25/11	SK Taman Rakan
Kajang (N25)	Taman Asa Jaya	102/25/12	KAFA Integrasi An-Nur Taman Asa Jaya
Kajang (N25)	Kajang Perdana	102/25/13	SK Sri Jelok
Kajang (N25)	Sungai Jeluk	102/25/14	KAFA Integrasi Al-Asmah
Kajang (N25)	Taman Bukit Mewah	102/25/15	SMK Jalan Bukit Kajang
Kajang (N25)	Reko Utara	102/25/16	SK Jalan Bukit (Satu)
Kajang (N25)	Taman Jasmin	102/25/17	SK Taman Jasmin
Kajang (N25)	Reko Selatan	102/25/18	SJK (T) West Country (Timur)
Kajang (N25)	Taman Kajang Mewah	102/25/19	SRA Taman Kajang Raya
Kajang (N25)	Bukit Kajang Baru	102/25/20	Dewan Orang Ramai Taman Bukit Mewah
Kajang (N25)	Kajang Prima	102/25/21	SMK Taman Jasmin 2
Sungai Ramal (N26)	Sungai Ramal Luar	102/26/01	SK Leftenan Adnan Sungai Ramal Luar; SMK Sungai Ramal
Sungai Ramal (N26)	Sungai Ramal Dalam	102/26/02	SR Agama Sungai Ramal Dalam
Sungai Ramal (N26)	Seksyen 3 BBB	102/26/03	SK Jalan 3; SMK Jalan 3
Sungai Ramal (N26)	Seksyen 1 BBB	102/26/04	SMK Bandar Baru Bangi
Sungai Ramal (N26)	Seksyen 6 BBB	102/26/05	SK Jalan Enam; SMK Bandar Baru Bangi
Sungai Ramal (N26)	Bangi	102/26/06	SK Bangi; SRA Pekan Bangi
Sungai Ramal (N26)	Taman Kajang Utama	102/26/07	SK Kajang Utama
Sungai Ramal (N26)	Seksyen 4 BBB	102/26/08	SK Jalan Empat
Sungai Ramal (N26)	Seksyen 5 BBB	102/26/09	SMK Jalan Reko
Sungai Ramal (N26)	Seksyen 2 BBB	102/26/10	SK Bandar Baru Bangi
Sungai Ramal (N26)	Universiti Kebangsaan Malaysia	102/26/11	Institut Latihan Kehakiman Dan Perundangan (ILKAP)
Sungai Ramal (N26)	Seksyen 7, 8 dan 9 BBB	102/26/12	SK Seksyen 7, SK Sungai Ramal Dalam
Sungai Ramal (N26)	Bandar Teknologi Kajang	102/26/13	SK Bandar Teknologi Kajang
Sungai Ramal (N26)	Impian Ehsan	102/26/14	KAFA Integrasi Al-Ehsaniyyah
Balakong (N27)	Kampung Baharu Balakong	102/27/01	SJK (C) Balakong
Balakong (N27)	Bandar Damai Perdana	102/27/02	SJK (C) Connaught 2; SMK Damai Perdana
Balakong (N27)	Perimbun	102/27/03	SMK Perimbun
Balakong (N27)	Batu 11 Cheras	102/27/04	SJK (C) Batu Sebelas Cheras
Balakong (N27)	Cheras Perdana	102/27/05	SMK Cheras Perdana
Balakong (N27)	Bandar Tun Hussein Onn	102/27/06	SK Bandar Tun Hussein Onn
Balakong (N27)	Simpang Balak	102/27/07	SMA Persekutuan Kajang
Balakong (N27)	Desa Baiduri	102/27/08	SK Desa Baiduri
Balakong (N27)	Cheras Jaya	102/27/09	SMK Cheras Jaya
Balakong (N27)	Taman Suria Jaya	102/27/10	SMK Bandar Tun Hussein Onn (2)
Balakong (N27)	Taman Sri Bahagia	102/27/11	SK Bandar Tun Hussein Onn (2); SRA Taman Tun Perak
Balakong (N27)	Balakong Jaya	102/27/12	Dewan Komuniti, Taman Desa Serdang
Balakong (N27)	Taming Jaya	102/27/13	SK Taming Jaya
Balakong (N27)	Sungai Chua Satu	102/27/14	SJK (C) Sungai Chua
Balakong (N27)	Sungai Chua Dua	102/27/15	SJK (C) Sungai Chua
Balakong (N27)	Sungai Chua Tiga	102/27/16	Pusat Rekrasi (Dewan Tertutup) JKKK Sungai Chua, Kajang
Balakong (N27)	Sungai Chua Empat	102/27/17	Pusat Rekrasi (Dewan Tertutup) JKKK Sungai Chua, Kajang
Balakong (N27)	Sungai Chua Lima	102/27/18	Dewan Orang Ramai Sungai Chua

=== Representation history ===
Members of Parliament for Bangi
Parliament	No	Years	Member	Party	Vote Share
Constituency split from Serdang and Hulu Langat
14th	P102	2018–2022	Ong Kian Ming (王建民)	PH (DAP)	102,557; 65.60%
15th	P102	2022–present	Syahredzan Johan (شهرضان جوهن)	PH (DAP)	141,568; 57.95%

=== State constituency ===
Parliamentary constituency	State constituency						
Parliamentary constituency	1955–59*	1959–1974	1974–1986	1986–1995	1995–2004	2004–2018	2018–present
Bangi							Balakong
Bangi							Kajang
Bangi							Sungai Ramal

=== Historical boundaries ===
State Constituency	Area
State Constituency	2018
Balakong	Balakong; Bandar Tun Hussein Onn; Batu 11 Cheras; Cheras Jaya; Sungai Chua
Kajang	Bandar Mahkota Cheras; Kajang; Saujana Impian; Sungai Long; Taman Bukit Mewah
Sungai Ramal	Bandar Baru Bangi; Bandar Teknologi Kajang; Pekan Bangi; Sungai Ramal; Taman Kajang Utama

=== Current state assembly members ===
No.	State Constituency	Member	Coalition (Party)
N25	Kajang	David Cheong Kian Young	PH (PKR)
N26	Sungai Ramal	Mohd Shafie Ngah	PN (PAS)
N27	Balakong	Wayne Ong Chun Wei	PH (DAP)

=== Local governments and postcodes ===
No.	State constituency	Local government	Postcode
N25	Kajang	Kajang Municipal Council	43000 Kajang; 43200 Cheras; 43300 Seri Kembangan; 43500 Semenyih; 43600 Bangi; 43650 Bandar Baru Bangi
N26	Sungai Ramal	Kajang Municipal Council	43000 Kajang; 43200 Cheras; 43300 Seri Kembangan; 43500 Semenyih; 43600 Bangi; 43650 Bandar Baru Bangi
N27	Balakong	Kajang Municipal Council	43000 Kajang; 43200 Cheras; 43300 Seri Kembangan; 43500 Semenyih; 43600 Bangi; 43650 Bandar Baru Bangi

== Election results ==
Malaysian general election, 2022
Party	Candidate	Votes	%	∆%
PH	Syahredzan Johan	141,568	57.95	▲57.95
PN	Muhammad Nazrul Hakim Md. Nazir	71,867	29.42	▲29.42
BN	Hoh Hee Lee	25,685	10.51	▼2.13
PEJUANG	Annuar Salleh	3,148	1.29	▲1.29
Parti Rakyat Malaysia	Chee Chee Meng	752	0.31	▲0.17
Independent	Jamal Hisham Hashim	676	0.28	▲0.28
Independent	Muhammad Fauzi Hasim	401	0.16	▲0.16
Independent	Suthan Mookaiah	194	0.08	▲0.08
Total valid votes		244,291	100.00	
Total rejected ballots		1,931		
Unreturned ballots		574		
Turnout		246,795	81.34	▼6.99
Registered electors		303,430		
Majority		69,701	28.53	▼15.46
PH hold		Swing		
Source(s) https://lom.agc.gov.my/ilims/upload/portal/akta/outputp/1753283/PUB612.pdf

Malaysian general election, 2018
Party	Candidate	Votes	%
PKR	Ong Kian Ming	102,557	65.60
PAS	Mohd Shafie Ngah	33,789	21.61
BN	Liew Yuen Keong	19,766	12.64
Parti Rakyat Malaysia	Wan Jinn Woei	215	0.14
Total valid votes		156,327	100.00
Total rejected ballots		1,114	
Unreturned ballots		492	
Turnout		157,933	88.33
Registered electors		178,790	
Majority		68,768	43.99
This was a new constituency created.
Source(s) "His Majesty's Government Gazette - Notice of Contested Election, Parliament for the State of Selangor [P.U. (B) 239/2018]" (PDF). Attorney General's Chambers of Malaysia. 3 May 2018. Archived from the original (PDF) on 2019-07-19. "Federal Government Gazette - Results of Contested Election and Statements of the Poll after the Official Addition of Votes, Parliamentary Constituencies for the State of Selangor [P.U. (B) 313/2018]" (PDF). Attorney General's Chambers of Malaysia. 28 May 2018. Archived from the original (PDF) on 2019-07-19.
