= 2018 Balakong by-election =

Malaysian state legislative by-election

- 8 September 2018

N27 Balakong seat in the Selangor State Legislative Assembly
	First party	Second party
	PH	MCA
Candidate	Wong Siew Ki	Tan Chee Teong
Party	DAP	MCA
Alliance	PH	BN
Popular vote	22,508	3,975
Percentage	84.99%	15.01%
- N27 Balakong state constituency border and the districts included within the constituency.
Balakong assemblyman before election
Eddie Ng Tien Chee (died)
Pakatan Harapan (DAP)
Elected Balakong assemblyman
Wong Siew Ki
Pakatan Harapan (DAP)

Balakong state constituency boundaries within the Bangi parliamentary constituency

A by-election was held on 8 September 2018 for the Selangor State Legislative Assembly seat of Balakong. The seat became vacant after the death of the incumbent assemblyman, Eddie Ng Tien Chee on 20 July 2018 in a traffic accident on the Cheras–Kajang Expressway. Eddie Ng was a member of the Democratic Action Party (DAP), a component party of the state ruling Pakatan Harapan (PH) coalition. This was the second casual vacancy in the Assembly since the May 2018 general election after Sungai Kandis, which held a by-election in August 2018. The by-election will be held on the same day as the Seri Setia by-election. In the last 2018 general election, Ng defeated Barisan Nasional (BN)'s Malaysian Chinese Association (MCA) candidate, Lim Chin Wah and Mohamad Ibrahim Ghazali of Pan-Malaysian Islamic Party (PAS), with a vote majority of 35,538.

The nomination day was on 18 August 2018. The by-election set for a straight fight between PH's DAP and BN's MCA. While PAS had decided not to contest to make way for the BN candidate, just liked in the case of the Sungai Kandis by-election a month earlier.

Pakatan Harapan retained the seat with a larger share of vote.

== Candidates ==
Pakatan Harapan (Democratic Action Party) Wong Siew Ki was serving as the Seri Kembangan assemblyman and Selangor state executive councillor Ean Yong Hian Wah’s political secretary and she was also Subang Jaya municipal councillor since 2016 then. She graduated in 2009 from the Universiti Putra Malaysia (UPM).

Barisan Nasional (Malaysian Chinese Association) Tan Chee Teong is a committee member in the Serdang Malaysian Chinese Association (MCA). He is a local of Balakong.

== Electoral logo quirk ==
This by-election marks the first time Pakatan Harapan had used their just approved common logo in an election. The then-federal opposition coalition was unable to contest the 2018 general election with their logo due to the Registrar of Societies not approving their registration in time for the election. The registration was finally approved only after the election, which delivered the coalition to power.

Conversely, the MCA will be using their own party logo for the first time since they joined Barisan Nasional in 1973. MCA candidates have normally used the BN common logo in elections up to the 2018 general election.

== Result ==
DAP and Pakatan Harapan's Wong Siew Ki polled 22,058 votes to MCA and Barisan Nasional's Tan Chee Teong's 3,975 votes retaining the seat for DAP and Pakatan Harapan.

Selangor state by-election, 8 September 2018: Balakong Upon the death of incumbent, Eddie Ng Tien Chee
Party	Candidate	Votes	%	∆%
PH	Wong Siew Ki	22,508	84.99	+ 7.46
MCA	Tan Chee Teong¹	3,975	15.01	+ 4.11
Total valid votes		26,483	100.00	
Total rejected ballots		227	0.86	+ 0.33
Unreturned ballots		24		
Turnout		26,734	42.97	45.21
Registered electors		62,219		
Majority		18,533	69.98	+ 4.01
PH hold		Swing		
Source(s) "Federal Government Gazette - Notice of Contested Election - By-election of the State Legislative Assembly of N.27 Balakong for the State of Selangor [P.U. (B) 498/2018]" (PDF). Attorney General's Chambers of Malaysia. 20 August 2018. "Federal Government Gazette - Results of Contested Election and Statement of the Poll after the Official Addition of Votes for the By-election of N.27 Balakong [P.U. (B) 522/2018]" (PDF). Attorney General's Chambers of Malaysia. 12 September 2018.

Note: ^{1}Tan Chee Teong was a candidate of Malaysian Chinese Association (MCA), who had contested under the MCA banner instead of the BN banner.

=== Results based on polling district ===
PH won all polling districts and post and early votes.

== Previous result ==
2018 Selangor state election: Balakong
Party	Candidate	Votes	%	±%
PH (DAP)	Eddie Ng Tien Chee	41,768	77.53	▲10.28
PAS	Mohamad Ibrahim Ghazali	6,230	11.56	N/A
BN (MCA)	Lim Chin Wah	5,874	10.90	▼20.10
Rejected ballots		286	0.53	▼0.91
Majority		35,538	65.97	▲29.72
Turnout		54,384	88.20	▼0.54
Registered electors		61,659		
PH hold		Swing	▲15.19	
