= Sungai Ramal =

State constituency in Malaysia

Sungai Ramal (N26)
Selangor constituency

State constituency
- Legislature: Selangor State Legislative Assembly
MLA
Mohd Shafie Ngah
PN
- Constituency created: 2018
- First contested: 2018
- Last contested: 2023

Demographics
- Electors (2023): 97,415

Sungai Ramal is a state constituency in Selangor, Malaysia, that has been represented in the Selangor State Legislative Assembly since 2018. It has been represented by Mohd Shafie Ngah of Perikatan Nasional (PN) since 2023.

The state constituency was created in the 2018 redistribution and is mandated to return a single member to the Selangor State Legislative Assembly under the first past the post voting system.

== Demographics ==
Ethnic breakdown of Sungai Ramal's electorate as of 2023
1. Malay (76.4%)
2. Chinese (9.45%)
3. Indian (9.18%)
4. Other ethnicities (4.94%)

== History ==
=== Polling districts ===
According to the federal gazette issued on 30 March 2018, the Sungai Ramal constituency is divided into 14 polling districts.

State constituency	Polling districts	Code	Location
Sungai Ramal（N26）	Sungai Ramal Luar	102/26/01	SK Leftenan Adnan Sungai Ramal Luar
Sungai Ramal（N26）	Sungai Ramal Dalam	102/26/02	SR Agama Sungai Ramal Dalam
Sungai Ramal（N26）	Seksyen 3 BBB	102/26/03	SK Jalan 3
Sungai Ramal（N26）	Seksyen 1 BBB	102/26/04	SMK Bandar Baru Bangi
Sungai Ramal（N26）	Seksyen 6 BBB	102/26/05	SK Jalan Enam
Sungai Ramal（N26）	Bangi	102/26/06	SK Bangi
Sungai Ramal（N26）	Taman Kajang Utama	102/26/07	SK Kajang Utama
Sungai Ramal（N26）	Seksyen 4 BBB	102/26/08	SK Jalan Empat
Sungai Ramal（N26）	Seksyen 5 BBB	102/26/09	SK Jalan Reko
Sungai Ramal（N26）	Seksyen 2 BBB	102/26/10	SK Bandar Baru Bangi
Sungai Ramal（N26）	Universiti Kebangsaan Malaysia	102/26/11	Dewan Serbaguna Institut Latihan Kehakiman Dan Perundangan (ILKAP)
Sungai Ramal（N26）	Seksyen 7, 8 dan 9 BBB	102/26/12	SK Seksyen 7
Sungai Ramal（N26）	Bandar Teknologi Kajang	102/26/13	SK Bandar Teknologi Kajang
Sungai Ramal（N26）	Impian Ehsan	102/26/14	KAFA Integrasi Al-Ehsaniyyah

=== Representation history ===
Members of the Legislative Assembly for Sungai Ramal
Assembly	No	Years	Member	Party
Constituency created from Bangi, Balakong and Kajang
14th	N26	2018-2023	Mazwan Johar	PH (AMANAH)
15th	N26	2023–present	Mohd Shafie Ngah	PN (PAS)

== Election results ==
Selangor state election, 2023: Sungai Ramal
Party	Candidate	Votes	%	∆%
PN	Mohd Shafie Ngah	40,259	55.34	▲55.34
PH	Mazwan Johar	32,492	44.66	▼6.65
Total valid votes		72,751	100.00	
Total rejected ballots		271		
Unreturned ballots		104		
Turnout		73,022	75.07	▼12.93
Registered electors		97,415		
Majority		7,767	10.68	▼11.50
PN gain from PKR		Swing		?

Selangor state election, 2018: Sungai Ramal
Party	Candidate	Votes	%
PKR	Mazwan Johar	24,591	51.31
PAS	Nushi Mahfodz	13,961	29.13
BN	Abdul Rahim Mohd Amin	9,372	19.56
Total valid votes		47,924	100.00
Total rejected ballots		356	
Unreturned ballots		86	
Turnout		48,366	88.00
Registered electors		54,961	
Majority		10,630	22.18
This was a new constituency created
