= Teo Nie Ching =

Malaysian politician and lawyer

Yang Berhormat Puan Teo Nie Ching MP
- 张念群
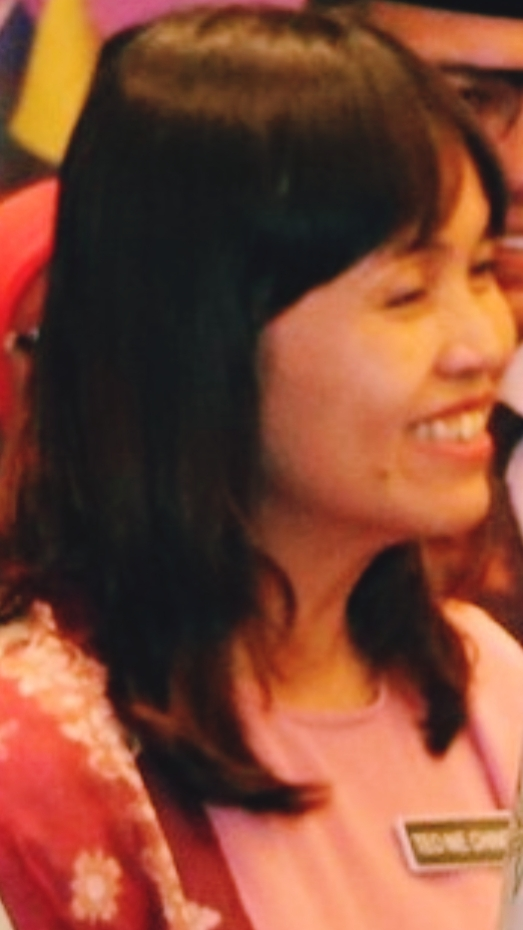
- Teo in 2019

Deputy Minister of Communications
- Incumbent
- Assumed office 12 December 2023
- Monarchs: Abdullah (2023–2024); Ibrahim (since 2024)
- Prime Minister: Anwar Ibrahim
- Minister: Fahmi Fadzil
- Preceded by: Herself (Deputy Minister of Communications and Digital)
- Constituency: Kulai

Deputy Minister of Communications and Digital
- In office 10 December 2022 – 12 December 2023
- Monarch: Abdullah
- Prime Minister: Anwar Ibrahim
- Minister: Fahmi Fadzil
- Preceded by: Zahidi Zainul Abidin (Deputy Minister of Communications and Multimedia)
- Succeeded by: Herself (Deputy Minister of Communications); Wilson Ugak Kumbong (Deputy Minister of Digital)
- Constituency: Kulai

Deputy Minister of Education
- In office 2 July 2018 – 24 February 2020
- Monarchs: Muhammad V (2018–2019); Abdullah (2019–2020)
- Prime Minister: Mahathir Mohamad
- Minister: Maszlee Malik (2018–2020); Mahathir Mohamad (Acting, 2020)
- Preceded by: P. Kamalanathan (Deputy Minister of Education I); Chong Sin Woon (Deputy Minister of Education II); Mary Yap Kain Ching (Deputy Minister of Higher Education)
- Succeeded by: Mah Hang Soon (Deputy Minister of Education I); Muslimin Yahaya (Deputy Minister of Education II); Mansor Othman (Deputy Minister of Higher Education)
- Constituency: Kulai

Member of the Malaysian Parliament for Kulai
- Incumbent
- Assumed office 5 May 2013
- Preceded by: Ong Ka Ting (BN–MCA)
- Majority: 13,450 (2013); 32,748 (2018); 36,023 (2022)

Member of the Malaysian Parliament for Serdang
- In office 8 March 2008 – 5 May 2013
- Preceded by: Yap Pian Hon (BN–MCA)
- Succeeded by: Ong Kian Ming (PR–DAP)
- Majority: 21,025 (2008)

National Vice Chairperson of the Democratic Action Party
- Incumbent
- Assumed office 16 March 2025 Serving with: Chong Chieng Jen &; Ng Suee Lim &; Syahredzan Johan &; Arul Kumar Jambunathan
- National Chairman: Gobind Singh Deo
- Secretary-General: Anthony Loke Siew Fook

National Publicity Secretary of the Democratic Action Party
- In office 20 March 2022 – 16 March 2025
- Secretary-General: Anthony Loke Siew Fook
- Assistant: Hannah Yeoh Tseow Suan; Ganabatirau Veraman
- Preceded by: Tony Pua Kiam Wee
- Succeeded by: Yeo Bee Yin

Women Chief of the Democratic Action Party
- Incumbent
- Assumed office 9 September 2023
- Deputy: Yeo Bee Yin
- Secretary-General: Anthony Loke Siew Fook
- Preceded by: Chong Eng

State Chairperson of the Democratic Action Party of Johor
- Incumbent
- Assumed office 6 October 2024
- Deputy: Wong Shu Qi
- Secretary-General: Anthony Loke Siew Fook
- Preceded by: Liew Chin Tong

International Secretary of the Democratic Action Party
- In office 12 November 2017 – 20 March 2022
- Secretary-General: Lim Guan Eng
- Succeeded by: Jannie Lasimbang

Assistant National Publicity Secretary of the Democratic Action Party
- In office 2008–2011
- Secretary-General: Lim Guan Eng
- Preceded by: Fong Po Kuan

Assistant State Organising Secretary of the Democratic Action Party of Selangor
- In office 2008–2011
- Secretary-General: Lim Guan Eng
- State Chairman: Ean Yong Hian Wah

Personal details
- Born: Teo Nie Ching; 27 January 1981 (age 45) Batu Pahat, Johor, Malaysia
- Party: Democratic Action Party (DAP)
- Other political affiliations: Pakatan Rakyat (PR) (2008–2015); Pakatan Harapan (PH) (since 2015)
- Spouse: Gan Saw Chien (m. 2011)
- Children: 3
- Education: University of the West of England (LLB); University of Malaya (CLP)
- Occupation: Politician
- Profession: Lawyer

Teo Nie Ching (simplified Chinese: 张念群; traditional Chinese: 張念群; pinyin: Zhāng Niànqún; Pe̍h-ōe-jī: Tioⁿ Liām-kûn; born 27 January 1981) is a Malaysian politician and lawyer who has served as the Deputy Minister of Communications under Minister Fahmi Fadzil since December 2023 and previously served as the Deputy Minister of Communications and Digital, also under Minister Fahmi Fadzil from December 2022 to December 2023 in the Unity Government administration under Prime Minister Anwar Ibrahim. She had served as Deputy Minister of Education in the PH administration under former Prime Minister Mahathir Mohamad, former Minister Maszlee Malik and former Acting Minister Mahathir from July 2018 to the collapse of the PH administration in February 2020. She served as the Member of Parliament (MP) for Serdang from March 2008 to May 2013 and then the MP for Kulai since May 2013. She is a member of the Democratic Action Party (DAP), a component party of the PH coalition. She has also served as the National Vice Chairperson of DAP since March 2025, Women Chief of DAP since September 2023 and State Chairperson of DAP of Johor since October 2024. She also served as the National Publicity Secretary of DAP from March 2022 to March 2025, International Secretary of DAP from November 2017 to March 2022, Assistant National Publicity Secretary of DAP and Assistant State Organising Secretary of DAP of Selangor from 2008 to 2011.

== Personal life ==
Teo was born to a political family. Her father was Secretary of the Labis Campaign Committee of DAP, while her sister and brother-in-law were Chief and Deputy Chair of the DAPSY Johor State Council.

Teo completed her secondary school education in Chinese High School, Batu Pahat, Johor. She pursued her tertiary education under a twinning programme and obtained her law degree from the University of the West of England, in 2002. After graduating from the university, she spent one year to work as a librarian in UK and travel around Europe. In 2004, she received her Certificate in Legal Practice from the University of Malaya.

== Political career ==
In the 2017 DAP re-elections, Teo received 1080 votes and was appointed as International Secretary.

Prior to the GE-14, Teo recorded a video promising to recognize Malaysia Chinese independent high school Unified Examination Certificate once Pakatan Harapan formed the federal government.

=== Deputy Minister of Education (2018-2020) ===
As a Chinese-ethnic, and being appointed as the deputy minister of education, Teo is urged by MCA to fulfill her promise and strengthen the Chinese education. Education Minister Dr Maszlee Malik confirmed that Pakatan Harapan will stick to its manifesto and recognise the UEC as a legitimate entry requirement for tertiary studies. However, there is no specific timeline set for this manifesto to be fulfilled.

=== Deputy Minister of Communications (2022-) ===
On 30 October 2023, Teo has told organisers of foreign artistes concert to create a ‘Kill Switch’ to avoid repeating the incident by The 1975 at Good Vibes Festival 2023.

== Controversies and issues ==
On 25 July 2019, Sin Chew Daily front-paged that the following year's Standard 4 Bahasa Malaysia syllabus would contain six pages of introduction to Jawi script in all vernacular schools. Following the rejection from NGOs such as Dong Zong, the cabinet approved that the Ministry of Education to allow vernacular schools teaching only Jawi script as a basic level, and not khat calligraphy with the consent of the students, parents as well as each school's Parent Teacher Association (PTA).

== Election results ==
In the 2008 general election, Teo ran for the Parliamentary seat of Serdang on a DAP ticket. She won against the candidate from Barisan Nasional, Datuk Hoh Hee Lee, with a majority of 21,025 votes. She obtained 47,444 votes comparing to her opposing candidate who only collected 26,419 votes.

In the 2013 general election, Teo switched to the state of Johor, in the Barisan Nasional stronghold Kulai, and defeated their candidate Tay Chin Hein by 13,450 out of 43,338 votes.

In the 2018 general election, Teo reelected for the Parliamentary seat of Kulai in the state of Johor. She defeated her 2 opponents, Tang Nai Soon (MCA) and Juwahir Amin (PAS) by 32,748 (64.68%, up 6.9%) out of 55,312 votes majority.

Parliament of Malaysia
| Year | Constituency | Candidate | Votes | Pct | Opponent(s) | Votes | Pct | Ballots cast | Majority | Turnout |
|---|---|---|---|---|---|---|---|---|---|---|
| 2008 | P102 Serdang | Teo Nie Ching (DAP) | 47,444 | 64.23% | Hoh Hee Lee (MCA) | 26,419 | 35.77% | 76,236 | 21,025 | 80.35% |
| 2013 | P163 Kulai | Teo Nie Ching (DAP) | 43,338 | 57.78% | Tay Chin Hein (MCA) | 29,888 | 39.85% | 75,010 | 13,450 | 89.30% |
| 2013 | P163 Kulai | Teo Nie Ching (DAP) | 43,338 | 57.78% | Surendiran Kuppayah (IND) | 238 | 0.32% | 75,010 | 13,450 | 89.30% |
| 2018 | P163 Kulai | Teo Nie Ching (DAP) | 55,312 | 64.68% | Tang Nai Soon (MCA) | 22,564 | 26.38% | 85,519 | 32,748 | 86.30% |
| 2018 | P163 Kulai | Teo Nie Ching (DAP) | 55,312 | 64.68% | Juwahir Amin (PAS) | 6,667 | 7.80% | 85,519 | 32,748 | 86.30% |
| 2022 | P163 Kulai | Teo Nie Ching (DAP) | 65,529 | 56.86% | Chua Jian Boon (MCA) | 29,506 | 25.60% | 115,253 | 36,023 | 76.20% |
| 2022 | P163 Kulai | Teo Nie Ching (DAP) | 65,529 | 56.86% | Tan Chen Hok (Gerakan) | 20,218 | 17.54% | 115,253 | 36,023 | 76.20% |

== Honours ==
=== Honours of Malaysia ===
- Malaysia
  - Recipient of the 17th Yang di-Pertuan Agong Installation Medal (2025)
