= Hoh Hee Lee =

Malaysian politician

Yang Berbahagia Dato' Hoh Hee Lee DSSA

Member of the Selangor State Legislative Assembly for Balakong
- In office 25 April 1995 – 8 March 2008
- Preceded by: new constituency
- Succeeded by: Yap Lum Chin (PR–DAP)
- Majority: 3,838 (1995); 877 (1999); 4,168 (2004)

Personal details
- Born: 20 July 1960 (age 66) Selangor, Federation of Malaya
- Party: Malaysian Chinese Association (MCA)
- Other political affiliations: Barisan Nasional (BN)
- Education: University of London (LLB)
- Occupation: Politician
- Profession: Lawyer

Hoh Hee Lee (born 20 July 1960) is a Malaysian politician and lawyer who served as Member of the Selangor State Legislative Assembly (MLA) for Balakong from April 1995 to March 2008. He is a member of Malaysian Chinese Association (MCA), a component party of Barisan Nasional (BN) coalitions.

== Election results ==
Selangor State Legislative Assembly
Year	Constituency	Candidate	Votes	Pct	Opponent(s)	Votes	Pct	Ballots cast	Majority	Turnout
1995	N31 Balakong	Hoh Hee Lee (MCA)	10,605	61.05%	Teong Shyan Chyuan (DAP)	6,767	38.95%	17,898	3,838	77.43%
1999	N31 Balakong	Hoh Hee Lee (MCA)	10,801	52.12%	Foo Shu Seong (DAP)	9,924	47.88%	21,137	877	77.35%
2004	N27 Balakong	Hoh Hee Lee (MCA)	10,289	62.70%	Ong Ing Siong (DAP)	6,121	37.30%	16,764	4,168	73.91%

Parliament of Malaysia
Year	Constituency	Candidate	Votes	Pct	Opponent(s)	Votes	Pct	Ballots cast	Majority	Turnout
2008	P102 Serdang	Hoh Hee Lee (MCA)	26,419	35.77%	Teo Nie Ching (DAP)	47,444	64.23%	76,236	21,025	80.35%
2022	P102 Bangi	Hoh Hee Lee (MCA)	25,685	10.51%	Syahredzan Johan (DAP)	141,568	57.95%	246,795	69,701	81.34%
2022	P102 Bangi	Hoh Hee Lee (MCA)	25,685	10.51%	Muhammad Nazrul Hakim Md Nazir (PAS)	71,867	29.42%	246,795	69,701	81.34%
2022	P102 Bangi	Hoh Hee Lee (MCA)	25,685	10.51%	Annuar Salleh (BERJASA)	3,148	1.29%	246,795	69,701	81.34%
2022	P102 Bangi	Hoh Hee Lee (MCA)	25,685	10.51%	Chee Chee Meng (PRM)	752	0.31%	246,795	69,701	81.34%
2022	P102 Bangi	Hoh Hee Lee (MCA)	25,685	10.51%	Jamal Hisham Hashim (IND)	676	0.28%	246,795	69,701	81.34%
2022	P102 Bangi	Hoh Hee Lee (MCA)	25,685	10.51%	Muhammad Fauzi Hasim (IND)	401	0.16%	246,795	69,701	81.34%
2022	P102 Bangi	Hoh Hee Lee (MCA)	25,685	10.51%	Suthan Mookaiah (IND)	194	0.08%	246,795	69,701	81.34%

== Honours ==
- Selangor
  - Knight Companion of the Order of Sultan Salahuddin Abdul Aziz Shah (DSSA) – Dato' (2001)
