= Lee Kim Sin =

Malaysian politician

- 李成金

Member of the Selangor State Legislative Assembly for Kajang
- In office 8 March 2008 – 5 May 2013
- Preceded by: Low Lee Leng (BN–MCA)
- Succeeded by: Lee Chin Cheh (PR–PKR)
- Majority: 3,268 (2008)

Personal details
- Born: 1955 Merbok, Kuala Muda, Kedah, Federation of Malaya
- Died: 11 May 2021 (aged 65–66)
- Party: People's Justice Party (PKR) (–2021)
- Other political affiliations: Pakatan Rakyat (PR) (2008–2015); Pakatan Harapan (PH) (2015–2021)
- Occupation: Politician

Lee Kim Sin is a Malaysian politician who served as Member of the Selangor State Legislative Assembly (MLA) for Kajang from March 2008 to May 2013. He is a member of People's Justice Party (PKR), a component party of Pakatan Harapan (PH) and formerly Pakatan Rakyat (PR) coalitions.

== Death ==
Lee Kim Sin died of a heart attack at the age of 66 in morning of Tuesday on 11 May 2021.

== Election results ==
Selangor State Legislative Assembly
Year	Constituency	Candidate	Votes	Pct	Opponent(s)	Votes	Pct	Ballots cast	Majority	Turnout
2004	N25 Kajang	Lee Kim Sin (PKR)	8,607	43.06%	Low Lee Leng (MCA)	11,380	56.94%	20,511	2,773	76.01%
2008	N25 Kajang	Lee Kim Sin (PKR)	13,220	57.05%	Low Lee Leng (MCA)	9,952	42.95%	23,823	3,268	79.76%
