= Bangi (state constituency) =

Selangor constituency

Defunct state constituency
- Legislature: Selangor State Legislative Assembly
- Constituency created: 2003
- Constituency abolished: 2018
- First contested: 2004
- Last contested: 2013

Bangi was a state constituency in Selangor, Malaysia, that had been represented in the Selangor State Legislative Assembly since 2004 until 2018.

The state constituency was created in the 2003 redistribution and is mandated to return a single member to the Selangor State Legislative Assembly under the first past the post voting system.

== History ==
It was abolished in 2018 when it was redistributed.

=== Representation history ===
Members of the Legislative Assembly for Bangi
Assembly	No	Years	Member	Party
Constituency created from Kajang
11th	N26	2004-2008	Amran Kasimin	BN (UMNO)
12th	N26	2008-2013	Shafie Abu Bakar	PR (PAS)
13th	N26	2013-2018	Mohd Shafie Ngah	PR (PAS)
Constituency renamed Sungai Ramal

== Election results ==
Selangor state election, 2013
Party	Candidate	Votes	%	∆%
PAS	Mohd Shafie Ngah	29,200	62.71	▲1.74
BN	Mohd Zaidi Md Zain	17,362	37.29	▼1.74
Total valid votes		46,562	100.00	
Total rejected ballots		454		
Unreturned ballots		149		
Turnout		47,165	88.54	▲8.27
Registered electors		53,268		
Majority		11,838	25.42	▲3.47
PAS hold		Swing		
Source(s) "Federal Government Gazette - Notice of Contested Election, State Legislative Assembly for the State of Selangor [P.U. (B) 192/2013]" (PDF). Attorney General's Chambers of Malaysia. 26 April 2013. Archived from the original (PDF) on 2019-12-29. "Federal Government Gazette - Results of Contested Election and Statements of the Poll after the Official Addition of Votes, State Constituencies for the State of Selangor [P.U. (B) 233/2013]" (PDF). Attorney General's Chambers of Malaysia. 22 May 2013. Archived from the original (PDF) on 2018-10-02."undi.info N26 BANGI".

Selangor state election, 2008
Party	Candidate	Votes	%	∆%
PAS	Shafie Abu Bakar	17,201	60.97	▲19.63
BN	Fathil Daud	11,009	39.03	▼19.63
Total valid votes		28,210	100.00	
Total rejected ballots		386		
Unreturned ballots		219		
Turnout		28,815	80.27	▲3.60
Registered electors		35,898		
Majority		6,192	21.95	▲4.64
PAS gain from BN		Swing		?
Source(s) "undi.info N26 BANGI".

Selangor state election, 2004
Party	Candidate	Votes	%
BN	Amran Kasimin	12,563	58.66
PAS	Shafie Abu Bakar	8,855	41.34
Total valid votes		21,418	100.00
Total rejected ballots		246	
Unreturned ballots		45	
Turnout		21,709	76.66
Registered electors		28,317	
Majority		3,708	17.31
This was a new constituency created.
Source(s) "undi.info N26 BANGI".
