= Yap Pian Hon =

Malaysian politician

Yang Berbahagia Dato' Yap Pian Hon DPMS SMS AMN PJK
- 叶炳汉

Member of the Malaysian Parliament for Serdang
- In office 25 April 1995 – 8 March 2008
- Preceded by: Constituency created
- Succeeded by: Teo Nie Ching (PR–DAP)
- Majority: 9,437 (1995); 4,099 (1999); 11,280 (2004)

Member of the Selangor State Legislative Assembly for Serdang
- In office 1982 – 25 April 1995
- Preceded by: Lee Lam Thye (DAP)
- Succeeded by: Constituency abolished
- Majority: 4,066 (1982); 4,183 (1986); 1,913 (1990)
- In office 1971 – 1978 (1969-1971 Assembly suspended of 13 May incident)
- Preceded by: Thuan Paik Phok (MCA-Alliance)
- Succeeded by: Lee Lam Thye (DAP)
- Majority: 3,314 (1969) (1974)

Personal details
- Born: 4 November 1943 (age 82) Serdang, Selangor, Japanese occupation of Malaya
- Citizenship: Malaysian
- Party: Democratic Action Party (DAP) (1968–1973); Independent (1973–1974); Malaysian Chinese Association (MCA) (since 1974)
- Other political affiliations: Barisan Nasional (BN) (1974–present)
- Occupation: Politician
- Website: mpserdang.blogspot.com

Yap Pian Hon
- Traditional Chinese: 葉炳漢
- Simplified Chinese: 叶炳汉
Transcriptions
Standard Mandarin
- Hanyu Pinyin: Yè Bǐnghàn
Yue: Cantonese
- Yale Romanization: Yihp Bíng-hon
Southern Min
- Hokkien POJ: Ia̍p Péng-hàn

Yap Pian Hon (simplified Chinese: 叶炳汉; traditional Chinese: 葉炳漢; pinyin: Yè Bǐnghàn; Cantonese Yale: Yihp Bíng-hon; Pe̍h-ōe-jī: Ia̍p Péng-hàn; born 4 November 1943) is a Malaysian politician from the Malaysian Chinese Association (MCA), a component party in the Barisan Nasional (BN). He is a veteran party leader from the state of Selangor, Malaysia.

Yap was a former Democratic Action Party (DAP) member and had left the party for MCA in 1974.

== Political career ==
Yap was the Selangor State Legislative Assemblyman for Serdang (Selangor state constituency) for five terms; representing DAP (1969-1974) and MCA (1974-1978; 1982–1995). Then Yap served as the Member of Parliament for Serdang (federal constituency) for three terms from 1995 to 2008. In the 2013 general election Yap was energetic and optimistic for being nominated again as the BN candidate for the Serdang parliamentary seat although already in his seventies. Somehow, unluckily he lost.

Yap joined DAP in 1968 and successfully stood for 1969 general election in Serdang state seat. He won but the state assembly was suspended from 1969 to 1971 upon national emergency declared because of 13 May incident in 1969. In 1973, Yap approached Selangor ruling BN's Menteri Besar Harun Idris for help to solve the problem of 50 families who were to be evicted after living for 50 years on mining land at the 8th mile Puchong Road to make way for a development project and the problem was solved in one month after the mining company allocated a piece of land for the families. Somehow Yap's actions had caused some disagreement and dispute with Lim Kit Siang, then party secretary-general. Yap quit DAP just before he got axed to be Independent. He joined MCA after being wooed by MCA president Lee San Choon in 1974 and stood for MCA in the 1974 general election.

Yap was an MCA former Youth chairman; a Serdang assemblyman and a Selangor executive councillor; was very outspoken regarding Chinese school and education matters. He was once detained under the Internal Security Act 1960 (ISA) during Operasi Lalang in 1987. He was also formerly three terms being one of MCA four vice-presidents from 1990 to 1999. He failed in his following attempts to be re-elected as the party vice-president again in 1999, 2005 and 2008 party elections. Despite being elected three times as vice-president, Yap was never recommended for the position of a minister or deputy minister, unlike the other vice-presidents. He was often described as “cat with nine lives” for his political tenacity.

One of his most notable contributions to the community of Serdang is the establishment of 1Malaysia Clinic in the Serdang area. The clinic would cater to almost 200,000 individuals in 30 housing areas in the particular area.

== Election results ==
Selangor State Legislative Assembly
Year	Constituency	Candidate	Votes	Pct	Opponent(s)	Votes	Pct	Ballots cast	Majority	Turnout
1969	N17 Serdang	Yap Pian Hon (DAP)	11,234	58.65%	Thuan Paik Phok (MCA)	7,920	41.35%	20,057	3,314	70.14%
1974	N27 Serdang	Yap Pian Hon (MCA)	3,584	45.80%	Lee Lam Thye (DAP)	2,965	37.89%	8,251	619	78.23%
1974	N27 Serdang	Yap Pian Hon (MCA)	3,584	45.80%	Ching Tow (IND)	980	12.52%	8,251	619	78.23%
1974	N27 Serdang	Yap Pian Hon (MCA)	3,584	45.80%	Pang Kuik My (PEKEMAS)	297	3.80%	8,251	619	78.23%
1978	N27 Serdang	Yap Pian Hon (MCA)	5,813	47.00%	Lee Lam Thye (DAP)	6,554	53.00%	N/A	741	N/A
1982	N27 Serdang	Yap Pian Hon (MCA)	9,753	63.17%	Fong Kui Lun (DAP)	5,687	36.83%	15,900	4,066	77.61%
1986	N30 Serdang	Yap Pian Hon (MCA)	11,367	61.27%	Pan Su Peng (DAP)	7,184	38.73%	18,824	4,183	68.51%
1990	N30 Serdang	Yap Pian Hon (MCA)	12,938	53.99%	Pan Su Peng (DAP)	11,025	46.01%	24,680	1,913	74.82%

Parliament of Malaysia
Year	Constituency	Candidate	Votes	Pct	Opposition(s)	Votes	Pct	Ballots cast	Majority	Turnout
1995	P096 Serdang	Yap Pian Hon (MCA)	32,757	55.46%	Lee Ban Chen (DAP)	23,320	39.49%	60,691	9,437	77.35%
1995	P096 Serdang	Yap Pian Hon (MCA)	32,757	55.46%	Mohd Radzi Hussain (PAS)	2,983	5.05%	60,691	9,437	77.35%
1999	P096 Serdang	Yap Pian Hon (MCA)	37,210	52.91%	Wong Ang Peng (DAP)	33,111	47.09%	72,618	4,099	76.56%
2004	P102 Serdang	Yap Pian Hon (MCA)	34,495	59.77%	Wong Kok Yew (DAP)	23,215	40.23%	59,850	11,280	75.92%
2013	P102 Serdang	Yap Pian Hon (MCA)	37,032	31.77%	Ong Kian Ming (DAP)	79,238	67.98%	118,314	42,206	88.87%

== Honours ==
- Malaysia
  - Member of the Order of the Defender of the Realm (AMN) (1977)
- Selangor
  - Knight Commander of the Order of the Crown of Selangor (DPMS) – Dato' (1985)
  - Companion of the Order of the Crown of Selangor (SMS) (1980)
  - Recipient of the Meritorious Service Medal (PJK)

== See also ==
- Serdang (Selangor state constituency)
- Serdang (federal constituency)
