= Mazwan Johar =

Malaysian politician

Member of the Selangor State Legislative Assembly for Sungai Ramal
- In office 9 May 2018 – 12 August 2023
- Preceded by: Position established
- Succeeded by: Mohd Shafie Ngah (PN–PAS)
- Majority: 10,630 (2018)

Personal details
- Born: Mazwan bin Johar; 29 October 1968 (age 57) Alor Setar, Kedah, Malaysia
- Party: National Trust Party (AMANAH)
- Other political affiliations: Pakatan Harapan (PH)
- Spouse: Sharifah Fadzliah Syed Taha
- Children: 5
- Occupation: Politician

Mazwan bin Johar (born 29 October 1968) is a Malaysian politician who served as Member of the Selangor State Legislative Assembly (MLA) for Sungai Ramal from May 2018 to August 2023. He is a member of the National Trust Party (AMANAH), a component party of the Pakatan Harapan (PH) coalition.

== Election results ==
Selangor State Legislative Assembly
Year	Constituency	Candidate	Votes	Pct	Opponent(s)	Votes	Pct	Ballots cast	Majority	Turnout
2018	N26 Sungai Ramal	Mazwan Johar (AMANAH)	24,591	51.31%	Nushi Mahfodz (PAS)	13,961	29.13%	48,366	10,630	88.00%
2018	N26 Sungai Ramal	Mazwan Johar (AMANAH)	24,591	51.31%	Abdul Rahim Mohd Amin (UMNO)	9,372	19.56%	48,366	10,630	88.00%
2023	N26 Sungai Ramal	Mazwan Johar (AMANAH)	32,492	44.66%	Mohd Shafie Ngah (PAS)	40,259	55.34%	73,126	7,767	75.07%

== See also ==
- Sungai Ramal (state constituency)
