= Shafie Abu Bakar =

Malaysian politician (born 1942)

Member of the Selangor State Legislative Assembly for Bangi
- In office 8 March 2008 – 5 May 2013
- Preceded by: Amran Kasimin (BN–UMNO)
- Succeeded by: Mohd Shafie Ngah (PR–PAS)
- Majority: 6,192 (2013)

Member of the Selangor State Legislative Assembly for Kajang
- In office 29 November 1999 – 21 March 2004
- Preceded by: Choong Tow Chong (BN–MCA)
- Succeeded by: Low Lee Leng (BN–MCA)
- Majority: 37 (1999)

Personal details
- Born: Shafie bin Abu Bakar; 27 May 1942 (age 83) Paka, Dungun, Terengganu, Japanese occupation of Malaya
- Party: Malaysian Islamic Party (PAS)
- Other political affiliations: Barisan Alternatif (BA) (1999–2004); Pakatan Rakyat (PR) (2008–2015); Gagasan Sejahtera (GS) (2016–2020); Perikatan Nasional (PN) (since 2020)
- Occupation: Politician
- Website: drshafie.blogspot.com

Shafie bin Abu Bakar (born 27 May 1942) is a Malaysian politician who served as Member of the Selangor State Legislative Assembly (MLA) for Bangi from March 2008 to May 2013 and Kajang from November 1999 to March 2004. He is a member of Malaysian Islamic Party (PAS), a component party of Perikatan Nasional (PN) coalitions, formerly GS, PR and BA coalitions.

== Election results ==
Selangor State Legislative Assembly
Year	Constituency	Candidate	Votes	Pct	Opponent(s)	Votes	Pct	Ballots cast	Majority	Turnout
1999	N23 Kajang	Shafie Abu Bakar (PAS)	10,922	50.08%	Choong Tow Chong (MCA)	10,885	49.92%	22,196	37	75.60%
2004	N26 Bangi	Shafie Abu Bakar (PAS)	8,855	41.34%	Amran Kasimin (UMNO)	12,563	58.66%	21,709	3,708	76.66%
2008	N26 Bangi	Shafie Abu Bakar (PAS)	29,200	62.71%	Mohd Zaidi Md Zain (UMNO)	17,362	37.29%	47,165	11,838	88.54%

== See also ==
- Bangi (state constituency)
- Kajang (state constituency)
