= Ong Kian Ming =

Malaysian politician and academic (born 1975)

- 王建民
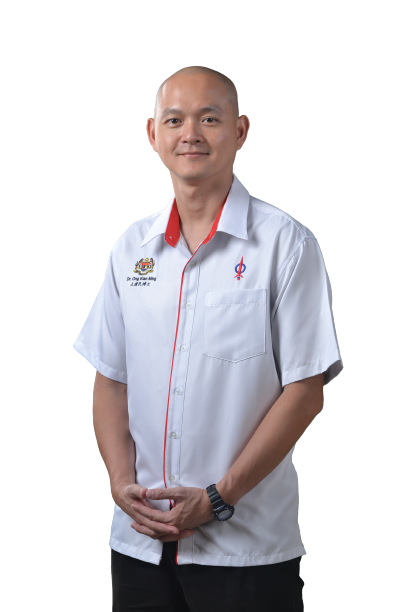

Deputy Minister of International Trade and Industry
- In office 2 July 2018 – 24 February 2020
- Monarchs: Muhammad V (2018–2019); Abdullah (2019–2020)
- Prime Minister: Mahathir Mohamad
- Minister: Darell Leiking
- Preceded by: Ahmad Maslan; Chua Tee Yong
- Succeeded by: Lim Ban Hong

Member of the Malaysian Parliament for Bangi
- In office 9 May 2018 – 19 November 2022
- Preceded by: Position established
- Succeeded by: Syahredzan Johan (PH–DAP)
- Majority: 68,768 (2018)

Member of the Malaysian Parliament for Serdang
- In office 5 May 2013 – 9 May 2018
- Preceded by: Teo Nie Ching (PR–DAP)
- Succeeded by: Position abolished
- Majority: 42,206 (2013)

Faction represented in Dewan Rakyat
- 2013–2018: Democratic Action Party
- 2018–2022: Pakatan Harapan

Personal details
- Born: Ong Kian Ming; 12 September 1975 (age 51) Kuala Lumpur, Malaysia
- Party: Democratic Action Party (DAP) (2012–2026); Independent (2026–present)
- Other political affiliations: Pakatan Rakyat (PR) (2012–2015); Pakatan Harapan (PH) (2015–2026)
- Spouse: Yeoh Ee Leng
- Education: London School of Economics (BSc); University of Cambridge (MPhil); Duke University (PhD)
- Occupation: Politician; lecturer; podcast host
- Website: https://ongkianming.com

Ong Kian Ming (Chinese: 王建民; pinyin: Wáng Jiànmín; Pe̍h-ōe-jī: Ông Kiàn-bîn; born 12 September 1975) is a Malaysian politician and lecturer who served as the Deputy Minister of International Trade and Industry from July 2018 to February 2020. He also served as the Member of Parliament (MP) for Bangi from May 2018 to November 2022, and Serdang from May 2013 to May 2018.

Prior to joining politics, Ong was a senior lecturer at the UCSI University and a prominent political analyst, whose articles were published in news portals such as Malaysiakini, Malaysian Insider and The Edge.

== Early life and education ==
Ong, a Fulbright scholar, holds a doctorate in political science from Duke University. He also has a master's degree in economics from Cambridge University and a bachelor's degree in economics from the London School of Economics. He completed his O- and A-levels at the Raffles Institution and Raffles Junior College in Singapore respectively.

== Academic career ==
Prior to his entry into politics, Ong was a lecturer at the UCSI University. He was also a researcher at the Institute of Strategic Analysis and Policy Research (INSAP) and Social Economic Development and Research Institute (SEDAR) think tanks, linked to the Malaysian Chinese Association (MCA) and Parti Gerakan Rakyat Malaysia (GERAKAN) respectively.

Ong also serves as the director of the Malaysian Electoral Roll Analysis Project (MERAP), an academic research group dedicated to electoral reform.

Ong returned to academia in 2023, joining Taylor's University as the director of a philosophy, politics, and economics programme.

== Political career ==
Ong joined the Democratic Action Party (DAP) in 2012. He was selected as Deputy Minister of International Trade and Industry by Mahathir Mohamad after the latter led Pakatan Harapan (PH) to an electoral victory in the 2018 Malaysian general election, where Ong was also elected as the Member of Parliament (MP) for Bangi. He left his role as deputy minister upon Mahathir's resignation during the 2020–2022 Malaysian political crisis.

In 2021, Ong, whose party was now in opposition, expressed support for co-operation with prime minister Muhyiddin Yassin when the latter offered to implement institutional reforms in exchange for political support ahead of a scheduled motion of no confidence against his government.

At the 2022 Democratic Action Party National Congress, Ong failed to defend his seat in the party's Central Executive Committee. Tony Pua Kiam Wee, another DAP MP who supported co-operation with Muhyiddin, also failed to defend his position in the committee.

Ong announced that he would not seek re-election ahead of the 2022 Malaysian general election, citing his poor performance in party polls, disagreements with other party leaders, as well as a promise to his wife to only serve two terms. He was succeeded by Syahredzan Johan as the party's candidate.

On 31 August 2026, Ong announced his departure from DAP after 14 years. Planning to remain an independent, Ong indicated that he did not intend to stand in the next Malaysian general election. However, he would campaign for UMNO member and former cabinet minister Khairy Jamaluddin should he be selected to stand in the election.

== Election results ==
Parliament of Malaysia
| Year | Constituency | Candidate | Votes | Pct | Opponent(s) | Votes | Pct | Ballots cast | Majority | Turnout |
|---|---|---|---|---|---|---|---|---|---|---|
| 2013 | P102 Serdang | Ong Kian Ming (DAP) | 79,238 | 67.98% | Yap Pian Hon (MCA) | 37,032 | 31.77% | 118,314 | 42,206 | 88.87% |
| 2018 | P102 Bangi | Ong Kian Ming (DAP) | 102,557 | 65.60% | Mohd Shafie Ngah (PAS) | 33,789 | 21.61% | 157,933 | 68,768 | 88.33% |
| 2018 | P102 Bangi | Ong Kian Ming (DAP) | 102,557 | 65.60% | Liew Yuen Keong (MCA) | 19,766 | 12.64% | 157,933 | 68,768 | 88.33% |
| 2018 | P102 Bangi | Ong Kian Ming (DAP) | 102,557 | 65.60% | Dennis Wan Jinn Woei (PRM) | 215 | 0.14% | 157,933 | 68,768 | 88.33% |
