= Syahredzan Johan =

Malaysian politician, lawyer and activist

Yang Berhormat Tuan Syahredzan Johan MP
- شه رضًا جوهن

Member of the Malaysian Parliament for Bangi
- Incumbent
- Assumed office 19 November 2022
- Preceded by: Ong Kian Ming (PH–DAP)
- Majority: 69,701 (2022)

National Vice Chairman of the Democratic Action Party
- Incumbent
- Assumed office 16 March 2025 Serving with: Chong Chieng Jen &; Teo Nie Ching &; Ng Suee Lim &; Arul Kumar Jambunathan
- National Chairman: Gobind Singh Deo
- Secretary-General: Anthony Loke Siew Fook

State Political Education Director of the Democratic Action Party of Selangor
- Incumbent
- Assumed office 10 November 2024
- Secretary-General: Anthony Loke Siew Fook
- State Chairman: Ng Sze Han
- Preceded by: Tiew Way Keng

Faction represented in Dewan Rakyat
- 2022–: Pakatan Harapan

Personal details
- Born: Syahredzan bin Johan; 10 June 1983 (age 43) Petaling Jaya, Selangor, Malaysia
- Citizenship: Malaysian
- Party: Democratic Action Party (DAP)
- Other political affiliations: Pakatan Harapan (PH)
- Parent: Johan Jaaffar (father)
- Education: Cardiff University (LLB)
- Occupation: Politician; activist
- Profession: Lawyer

Syahredzan bin Johan (Jawi: شه رضًا بن جوهن, born 10 June 1983) is a Malaysian politician, lawyer and activist who has served as the Member of Parliament (MP) for Bangi since November 2022. He is a member of the Democratic Action Party (DAP), a component party of the Pakatan Harapan (PH) coalition. He has also served as the National Vice Chairman of DAP since March 2025 and the State Political Education Director of DAP of Selangor since November 2024.

== Early life ==
Syahredzan Johan was born in Petaling Jaya, Selangor on 10 June 1983, to Tan Sri Johan Jaaffar, former Chairman of Dewan Bahasa dan Pustaka (DBP). Syahredzan graduated with a LL.B. degree from Cardiff University in 2005 before he was called to the Bar of England and Wales. He subsequently returned to Malaysia and read in the chambers of RamRais & Partners, and was admitted as an advocate and solicitor of the High Court of Malaya in October 2007.

== Political career ==
He began his political career in 2018 after being appointed as political secretary to DAP veteran Lim Kit Siang. He was elected to Parliament in the 2022 general election for the Bangi seat after his predecessor Ong Kian Ming decided not to seek reelection as the Bangi MP.

== Personal life ==
Syahredzan is a supporter of English football club Everton.

== Election results ==
Parliament of Malaysia
Year	Constituency	Candidate	Votes	Pct	Opponent(s)	Votes	Pct	Ballots cast	Majority	Turnout
2022	P102 Bangi	Syahredzan Johan (DAP)	141,568	57.95%	Muhammad Nazrul Hakim Md. Nazir (PAS)	71,867	29.42%	246,795	69,701	81.34%
2022	P102 Bangi	Syahredzan Johan (DAP)	141,568	57.95%	Hoh Hee Lee (MCA)	25,685	10.51%	246,795	69,701	81.34%
2022	P102 Bangi	Syahredzan Johan (DAP)	141,568	57.95%	Annuar Salleh (PEJUANG)	3,148	1.29%	246,795	69,701	81.34%
2022	P102 Bangi	Syahredzan Johan (DAP)	141,568	57.95%	Chee Chee Meng (PRM)	752	0.31%	246,795	69,701	81.34%
2022	P102 Bangi	Syahredzan Johan (DAP)	141,568	57.95%	Jamal Hisham Hashim (IND)	676	0.28%	246,795	69,701	81.34%
2022	P102 Bangi	Syahredzan Johan (DAP)	141,568	57.95%	Muhammad Fauzi Hasim (IND)	401	0.16%	246,795	69,701	81.34%
2022	P102 Bangi	Syahredzan Johan (DAP)	141,568	57.95%	Suthan Mookaiah (IND)	194	0.08%	246,795	69,701	81.34%

== Honours ==
=== Honours of Malaysia ===
- Malaysia
  - Recipient of the 17th Yang di-Pertuan Agong Installation Medal (2025)

== See also ==
- Members of the Dewan Rakyat, 15th Malaysian Parliament
