= Mohd Shafie Ngah =

Malaysian politician (born 1966)

Yang Berhormat Tuan Mohd Shafie Ngah SMS MLA
- محمد شافعي ڠه
- Shafie Ngah

Deputy Speaker of the Selangor State Legislative Assembly
- In office 24 November 2014 – 9 April 2018
- Monarch: Sharafuddin
- Menteri Besar: Azmin Ali
- Speaker: Hannah Yeoh Tseow Suan
- Preceded by: Nik Nazmi Nik Ahmad
- Succeeded by: Mohd Khairuddin Othman
- Constituency: Bangi

Member of the Selangor State Legislative Assembly for Sungai Ramal
- Incumbent
- Assumed office 12 August 2023
- Preceded by: Mazwan Johar (PH–AMANAH)
- Majority: 7,767 (2023)

Member of the Selangor State Legislative Assembly for Bangi
- In office 5 May 2013 – 9 May 2018
- Preceded by: Shafie Abu Bakar (PR–PAS)
- Succeeded by: Position abolished
- Majority: 11,838 (2013)

Personal details
- Born: Mohd Shafie bin Ngah; 21 August 1966 (age 60) Sekinchan, Selangor, Malaysia
- Party: Malaysian Islamic Party (PAS)
- Other political affiliations: Pakatan Rakyat (PR) (2008–2015); Gagasan Sejahtera (GS) (2016–2020); Perikatan Nasional (PN) (since 2020)
- Children: 4 sons and 1 daughter
- Occupation: Politician

Mohd Shafie bin Ngah (born 21 August 1966) is a Malaysian politician who has served as Member of the Selangor State Legislative Assembly (MLA) for Sungai Ramal since August 2023. He served as the Deputy Speaker of the Selangor State Legislative Assembly from September 2014 to April 2018 and the MLA for Bangi from May 2013 to May 2018. He is a member and State Vice Commissioner of Selangor of the Malaysian Islamic Party (PAS), a component party of Perikatan Nasional (PN) and formerly Gagasan Sejahtera (GS) and Pakatan Rakyat (PR) coalitions.

== Election results ==
Selangor State Legislative Assembly
Year	Constituency	Candidate	Votes	Pct	Opponent(s)	Votes	Pct	Ballots cast	Majority	Turnout
2013	N26 Bangi	Mohd Shafie Ngah (PAS)	29,200	62.71%	Mohd Zaidi Md Zain (UMNO)	17,362	37.29%	47,165	11,838	88.54%
2023	N26 Sungai Ramal	Mohd Shafie Ngah (PAS)	40,259	55.34%	Mazwan Johar (AMANAH)	32,492	44.66%	73,022	7,767	75.07%

Parliament of Malaysia
Year	Constituency	Candidate	Votes	Pct	Opponent(s)	Votes	Pct	Ballots cast	Majority	Turnout
2018	P102 Bangi	Mohd Shafie Ngah (PAS)	33,789	21.61%	Ong Kian Ming (DAP)	102,557	65.60%	157,933	68,768	88.33%
2018	P102 Bangi	Mohd Shafie Ngah (PAS)	33,789	21.61%	Liew Yuen Keong (MCA)	19,766	12.64%	157,933	68,768	88.33%
2018	P102 Bangi	Mohd Shafie Ngah (PAS)	33,789	21.61%	Dennis Wan Jinn Woei (PRM)	215	0.14%	157,933	68,768	88.33%

== Honours ==
- Selangor
  - Companion of the Order of the Crown of Selangor (SMS) (2017)

== See also ==
- Bangi (state constituency)
- Sungai Ramal (state constituency)
