= Serdang (federal constituency) =

Selangor constituency

Defunct federal constituency
- Legislature: Dewan Rakyat
- Constituency created: 1994
- Constituency abolished: 2018
- First contested: 1995
- Last contested: 2013

Serdang was a federal constituency in Selangor, Malaysia, that was represented in the Dewan Rakyat from 1995 to 2018.

The federal constituency was created from parts of the Puchong and Hulu Langat constituencies in the 1994 redistribution and was mandated to return a single member to the Dewan Rakyat under the first past the post voting system.

== History ==
It was abolished in 2018 when it was redistributed.

=== Representation history ===
Members of Parliament for Serdang
Parliament	No	Years	Member	Party
Constituency created from Sepang, Puchong and Hulu Langat
9th	P096	1995–1999	Yap Pian Hon (叶炳汉)	BN (MCA)
10th	P096	1999-2004	Yap Pian Hon (叶炳汉)	BN (MCA)
11th	P102	2004–2008	Yap Pian Hon (叶炳汉)	BN (MCA)
12th	P102	2008–2013	Teo Nie Ching (张念群)	PR (DAP)
13th	P102	2013–2015	Ong Kian Ming (王建民)	PR (DAP)
13th	P102	2015–2018	Ong Kian Ming (王建民)	PH (DAP)
Constituency abolished, split into Sepang, Hulu Langat, Bangi and Puchong

=== State constituency ===
Parliamentary constituency	State constituency						
Parliamentary constituency	1955–59*	1959–1974	1974–1986	1986–1995	1995–2004	2004–2018	2018–present
Serdang					Balakong		
Serdang						Bangi	
Serdang					Pucung		
Serdang						Seri Kembangan	
Serdang					Sri Kembangan		

=== Historical boundaries ===
State Constituency	State constituency	
State Constituency	1994	2004
Balakong	Balakong; Bandar Tun Hussein Onn; Sungai Chua; Sungai Ramal; Taman Kajang Impian	Balakong; Bandar Tun Hussein Onn; Batu 11 Cheras; Cheras Jaya; Damai Perdana
Bangi		Bandar Baru Bangi; Bukit Mahkota; Pekan Bangi; Sungai Ramal; Sungai Tangkas
Pucung	Bukit Puchong; Kampung Sri Aman; Puchong Jaya; Putra Permai; Serdang Jaya	
Seri Kembangan	Bukit Serdang; Serdang Lama; Seri Kembangan; Taman Sungai Besi Indah; Taman Universiti Indah	

== Election results ==
Malaysian general election, 2013
Party	Candidate	Votes	%	∆%
DAP	Ong Kian Ming	79,238	68.15	▲3.92
BN	Yap Pian Hon	37,032	31.85	▼3.92
Total valid votes		116,270	100.00	
Total rejected ballots		1,778		
Unreturned ballots		291		
Turnout		118,339	88.88	▲8.53
Registered electors		133,139		
Majority		42,206	36.30	▲7.84
DAP hold		Swing		{{{2}}}
Source(s) "Federal Government Gazette - Notice of Contested Election, Parliament for the State of Selangor [P.U. (B) 176/2013]" (PDF). Attorney General's Chambers of Malaysia. 26 April 2013. Archived from the original (PDF) on 2018-09-30. "Federal Government Gazette - Results of Contested Election and Statements of the Poll after the Official Addition of Votes, Parliamentary Constituencies for the State of Selangor [P.U. (B) 217/2013]" (PDF). Attorney General's Chambers of Malaysia. 22 May 2013. Archived from the original (PDF) on 2018-09-30.

Malaysian general election, 2008
Party	Candidate	Votes	%	∆%
DAP	Teo Nie Ching	47,444	64.23	▲24.00
BN	Hoh Hee Lee	26,419	35.77	▼24.00
Total valid votes		73,863	100.00	
Total rejected ballots		2,072		
Unreturned ballots		301		
Turnout		76,236	80.35	▲4.43
Registered electors		94,877		
Majority		21,025	28.46	▲8.92
DAP gain from BN		Swing		?

Malaysian general election, 2004
Party	Candidate	Votes	%	∆%
BN	Yap Pian Hon	34,495	59.77	▼6.86
DAP	Wong Kok Yew	23,215	40.23	▲6.86
Total valid votes		57,710	100.00	
Total rejected ballots		2,038		
Unreturned ballots		102		
Turnout		59,850	75.92	▼0.64
Registered electors		78,832		
Majority		11,280	19.54	▲13.72
BN hold		Swing		{{{2}}}

Malaysian general election, 1999
Party	Candidate	Votes	%	∆%
BN	Yap Pian Hon	37,210	52.91	▼2.55
DAP	Wong Ang Peng	33,111	47.09	▲7.60
Total valid votes		70,321	100.00	
Total rejected ballots		1,707		
Unreturned ballots		590		
Turnout		72,618	76.56	▼0.79
Registered electors		94,851		
Majority		4,099	5.82	▼10.15
BN hold		Swing		{{{2}}}

Malaysian general election, 1995
Party	Candidate	Votes	%
BN	Yap Pian Hon	32,757	55.46
DAP	Lee Ban Chen	23,320	39.49
PAS	Mohd. Radzi Hussain	2,983	5.05
Total valid votes		59,060	100.00
Total rejected ballots		1,243	
Unreturned ballots		388	
Turnout		60,691	77.35
Registered electors		78,462	
Majority		9,437	15.97
This was a new constituency created.
