= Seri Kembangan (state constituency) =

State constituency in Selangor, Malaysia

Seri Kembangan (N28)
Selangor constituency

State constituency
- Legislature: Selangor State Legislative Assembly
MLA
Wong Siew Ki
PH
- Constituency created: 1994
- First contested: 1995
- Last contested: 2023

Demographics
- Population (2020): 130,252
- Electors (2023): 62,822

Seri Kembangan is a state constituency in Selangor, Malaysia, that has been represented in the Selangor State Legislative Assembly since 1995. It has been represented by Wong Siew Ki of Pakatan Harapan (PH) since 2023.

The state constituency was created in the 1994 redistribution and is mandated to return a single member to the Selangor State Legislative Assembly under the first past the post voting system.

== Demographics ==
Ethnic breakdown of Seri Kembangan's electorate as of 2023
1. Chinese (78.6%)
2. Malay (11.1%)
3. Indian (8.81%)
4. Other ethnicities (1.44%)

== History ==
=== Polling districts ===
According to the gazette issued on 30 March 2018, the Seri Kembangan constituency has a total of 21 polling districts.

State constituency	Polling districts	Code	Location
Seri Kembangan (N28)	Serdang Lama	103/28/01	SJK (C) Kung Man Serdang
Seri Kembangan (N28)	Serdang Utama	103/28/02	SMK Seri Kembangan
Seri Kembangan (N28)	Seri Kembangan 2	103/28/03	SMK Seri Kembangan
Seri Kembangan (N28)	Seri Kembangan 1	103/28/04	SMK Seri Kembangan
Seri Kembangan (N28)	Seri Kembangan 4	103/28/05	SJK (C) Serdang Baru 1 Seri Kembangan
Seri Kembangan (N28)	Seri Kembangan 5	103/28/06	Balai Masyarakat Kawasan 5 Seri Kembangan
Seri Kembangan (N28)	Seri Kembangan 9	103/28/07	SJK (C) Serdang Baru 1 Seri Kembangan
Seri Kembangan (N28)	Seri Kembangan 11	103/28/08	Dewan Seberguna Seri Kembangan
Seri Kembangan (N28)	Seri Kembangan 8	103/28/09	Dewan Seberguna Seri Kembangan
Seri Kembangan (N28)	Seri Kembangan 10	103/28/10	Dewan Seberguna Seri Kembangan
Seri Kembangan (N28)	Seri Kembangan 12	103/28/11	Dewan Seberguna Seri Kembangan
Seri Kembangan (N28)	Seri Kembangan 7	103/28/12	Balai Masyarakat Jalan SK 7/6, Kawasan 7 Seri Kembangan
Seri Kembangan (N28)	Seri Kembangan 6	103/28/13	Dewan Seberguna Seri Kembangan
Seri Kembangan (N28)	Seri Kembangan 3	103/28/14	SJK (C) Serdang Baru 1 Seri Kembangan
Seri Kembangan (N28)	Bukit Serdang	103/28/15	Balai Masyarakat Taman Bukit Serdang, Seksyen 5 Seri Kembangan
Seri Kembangan (N28)	Taman Universiti Indah	103/28/16	SK Taman Universiti Seri Kembangan
Seri Kembangan (N28)	Desa Serdang	103/28/17	SMK Desa Serdang
Seri Kembangan (N28)	Taman Muhibbah	103/28/18	Balai Masyarakat Taman Muhibbah
Seri Kembangan (N28)	Sungai Besi Indah	103/28/19	SK Taman Sungai Besi Indah
Seri Kembangan (N28)	Serdang Raya	103/28/20	Komplek Kemudahan Kemasyarakatan Serdang Raya
Seri Kembangan (N28)	Taman Bukit Belimbing	103/28/21	KAFA Integrasi Bukit Belimbing

=== Representation history ===
Members of the Legislative Assembly for Seri Kembangan
Assembly	No	Years	Member	Party
Constituency created from Serdang
Sri Kembangan
9th	N30	1995-1999	Liew Yuen Keong (廖润強)	BN (MCA)
10th	N30	1999–2004	Liew Yuen Keong (廖润強)	BN (MCA)
Seri Kembangan
11th	N28	2004–2008	Liew Yuen Keong (廖润強)	BN (MCA)
12th	N28	2008–2013	Ean Yong Hian Wah (欧阳捍华)	PR (DAP)
13th	N28	2013–2015	Ean Yong Hian Wah (欧阳捍华)	PR (DAP)
13th	N28	2015–2018	Ean Yong Hian Wah (欧阳捍华)	PH (DAP)
14th	N28	2018–2023	Ean Yong Hian Wah (欧阳捍华)	PH (DAP)
15th	N28	2023–present	Wong Siew Ki (王诗棋)	PH (DAP)

== Election results ==
Selangor state election, 2023
Party	Candidate	Votes	%	∆%
PH	Wong Siew Ki	39,684	89.30	▼1.49
PN	Ken Liau Wei Jian	3,524	7.93	▲7.93
Independent	Wong Jung Lik	1,229	2.77	▲2.77
Total valid votes		44,437	100.00	
Total rejected ballots		208		
Unreturned ballots		15		
Turnout		44,660	71.09	▼18.38
Registered electors		62,822		
Majority		36,160	81.37	▼0.21
PH hold		Swing		

Selangor state election, 2018
Party	Candidate	Votes	%	∆%
PKR	Ean Yong Hian Wah	34,659	90.79	▲90.79
BN	Chang Toong Woh	3,514	9.21	▼7.07
Total valid votes		38,173	100.00	
Total rejected ballots		265		
Unreturned ballots		581		
Turnout		39,019	89.47	▼0.07
Registered electors		43,611		
Majority		31,145	81.58	▲14.14
PKR hold		Swing		

Selangor state election, 2013
Party	Candidate	Votes	%	∆%
DAP	Ean Yong Hian Wah	27,406	83.72	▲19.67
BN	Chin Toong Kang	5,328	16.28	▼18.48
Total valid votes		32,734	100.00	
Total rejected ballots		387		
Unreturned ballots		48		
Turnout		33,169	89.54	▲6.60
Registered electors		37,042		
Majority		22,078	67.44	▲38.15
DAP hold		Swing		
Source(s) "Federal Government Gazette - Notice of Contested Election, State Legislative Assembly for the State of Selangor [P.U. (B) 192/2013]" (PDF). Attorney General's Chambers of Malaysia. 26 April 2013. Archived from the original (PDF) on 2019-12-29. "Federal Government Gazette - Results of Contested Election and Statements of the Poll after the Official Addition of Votes, State Constituencies for the State of Selangor [P.U. (B) 233/2013]". Attorney General's Chambers of Malaysia. 22 May 2013. Archived from the original (PDF) on 2018-10-02.

Selangor state election, 2008
Party	Candidate	Votes	%	∆%
DAP	Ean Yong Hian Wah	15,841	64.05	▲32.54
BN	Liew Yuen Keong	8,597	34.76	▼33.73
Independent	Wong Kok Yew	294	1.19	▲1.19
Total valid votes		24,732	100.00	
Total rejected ballots		361		
Unreturned ballots		34		
Turnout		25,127	82.94	▲6.24
Registered electors		30,297		
Majority		7,244	29.29	▼7.69
DAP gain from BN		Swing		?

Selangor state election, 2004
Party	Candidate	Votes	%	∆%
BN	Liew Yuen Keong	14,379	68.49	▲5.90
DAP	Lee Yee Lian	6,616	31.51	▼5.90
Total valid votes		20,995	100.00	
Total rejected ballots		356		
Unreturned ballots				
Turnout		21,351	76.70	▼2.30
Registered electors		27,837		
Majority		7,763	36.98	▲11.80
BN hold		Swing		

Selangor state election, 1999: Sri Kembangan
Party	Candidate	Votes	%	∆%
BN	Liew Yuen Keong	11,869	62.59	▲3.45
DAP	Wong Kok Yew	7,095	37.41	▼3.45
Total valid votes		18,964	100.00	
Total rejected ballots		327		
Unreturned ballots		7		
Turnout		19,298	79.00	▼1.35
Registered electors		24,428		
Majority		4,774	25.18	▲6.90
BN hold		Swing		

Selangor state election, 1995: Sri Kembangan
Party	Candidate	Votes	%
BN	Liew Yuen Keong	9,606	59.14
DAP	Lim Soon Hong	6,638	40.86
Total valid votes		16,244	100.00
Total rejected ballots		282	
Unreturned ballots		17	
Turnout		16,543	80.35
Registered electors		20,589	
Majority		2,968	18.28
This was a new constituency created.
