= Wayne Ong Chun Wei =

Malaysian politician

Yang Berhormat Tuan Wayne Ong Chun Wei MLA
- 王俊伟

Deputy Youth Chief of the Democratic Action Party
- Incumbent
- Assumed office 17 November 2024
- Secretary-General: Anthony Loke Siew Fook
- Youth Chief: Woo Kah Leong
- Preceded by: Young Syefura Othman

Youth Secretary of the Democratic Action Party
- In office 19 March 2022 – 17 November 2024
- Secretary-General: Lim Guan Eng (19–20 March 2022); Anthony Loke Siew Fook (2022–2024)
- Youth Chief: Kelvin Yii Lee Wuen
- Assistant: Ang Yien Meei
- Preceded by: Eric Teh Hoong Keat
- Succeeded by: Louis Lim Chun Weng

State Youth Chief of the Democratic Action Party of Selangor
- In office 12 June 2022 – 28 September 2025
- Secretary-General: Anthony Loke Siew Fook
- National Youth Chief: Kelvin Yii Lee Wuen (2022–2024); Woo Kah Leong (2024–2025)
- Deputy: Tan Wee King
- Preceded by: Wong Siew Ki
- Succeeded by: Lee Wen Bin

State Youth Secretary of the Democratic Action Party of Selangor
- In office 21 November 2018 – 12 June 2022
- Secretary-General: Lim Guan Eng (2018–2022); Anthony Loke Siew Fook (20 March–12 June 2022)
- National Youth Chief: Wong Kah Woh (21 November – 2 December 2018); Howard Lee Chuan How (2018–2022); Kelvin Yii Lee Wuen (19 March–12 June 2022)
- State Youth Chief: Wong Siew Ki
- Assistant: Anson Keo Heng Kiat
- Succeeded by: Lee Wen Bin

Member of the Selangor State Legislative Assembly for Balakong
- Incumbent
- Assumed office 12 August 2023
- Preceded by: Wong Siew Ki (PH–DAP)
- Majority: 37,832 (2023)

Personal details
- Born: Wayne Ong Chun Wei; 31 March 1989 (age 37) Perak, Malaysia
- Citizenship: Malaysian
- Party: Democratic Action Party (DAP)
- Other political affiliations: Pakatan Harapan (PH)
- Parent(s): (王忠义) (Father) (黄亚莲) (Mother)
- Education: Universiti Utara Malaysia (UUM); National University of Malaysia (UKM); (Bachelor of Economics (Honours); Master of Social Science (Political Science))
- Occupation: Politician

Wayne Ong Chun Wei

Chinese name
- Traditional Chinese: 王俊偉
- Simplified Chinese: 王俊伟
Transcriptions
Standard Mandarin
- Hanyu Pinyin: Wáng Jùnwěi

Wayne Ong Chun Wei (simplified Chinese: 王俊伟; traditional Chinese: 王俊偉; pinyin: Wáng Jùnwěi; born 31 March 1989) is a Malaysian politician who has served as Member of the Selangor State Legislative Assembly (MLA) for Balakong since August 2023. He is a member of the Democratic Action Party (DAP), a component party of the Pakatan Harapan (PH) coalition. He has also served as Deputy Youth Chief of DAP since November 2024. He served as Member of the Sepang Municipal Council (MPSepang) from 2016 to 2018, Youth Secretary of DAP from March 2022 to his promotion to Deputy Youth Chief in November 2024, State Youth Chief of DAP of Selangor from June 2022 to September 2025 and State Youth Secretary of DAP of Selangor from November 2018 to his promotion to State Youth Chief in June 2022. As Balakong MLA, Ong is notable for helping stateless individuals especially children, teenagers and young adults to apply for the Malaysian citizenships.

== Political career ==
Ong was also the Confidential and Political Secretary to Member of the Selangor State Executive Council (EXCO) and MLA for Kinrara Ng Sze Han for 5 years. However, he joined the team of Ng in 2013 and has worked with him even before he was appointed his secretary for about 10 years. When he was the Member of MPSepang, Ong organised children activities that were also attended by parents and provided chances for the community residents to form closer relations. During his tenure as the secretary to Ng, Ong helped the Selangor people to register for welfare programmes of the state government of Selangor, handled the transfers of schools of students, visited patients and attended other community activities.

=== Member of the Selangor State Legislative Assembly (since 2023) ===
==== 2023 Selangor state election ====
In the 2023 Selangor state election, Ong made his electoral debut after being nominated by PH to contest the Balakong state seat. Ong won the seat and was elected to the Selangor State Legislative Assembly as the Balakong MLA after defeating Steven Lai Choon Wen of Perikatan Nasional (PN) by a majority of 37,832 votes.

As the Balakong MLA, Ong pledged to become the bridge between the people, traders and the state government, advance the industrial areas in Balakong to meet the Fourth Industrial Revolution (Industry 4.0) target, establish neighborhood culture and strengthen community bonds in Balakong. He also revealed that one of his predecessors as the Balakong MLA Eddie Ng Tien Chee was his role model in his work as the Balakong MLA.

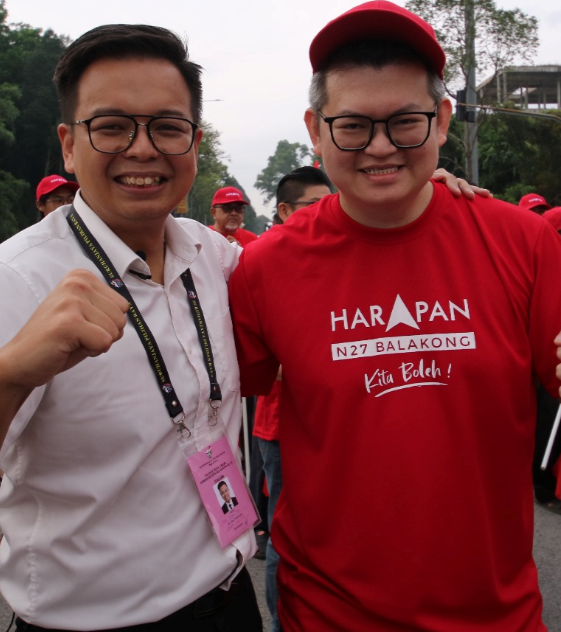
Ong and Member of Parliament (MP) for Bandar Kuching Kelvin Yii Lee Wuen standing, smiling and making fists in Selangor, Malaysia on the Nomination Day of the 2023 Selangor state election on 29 July 2023.

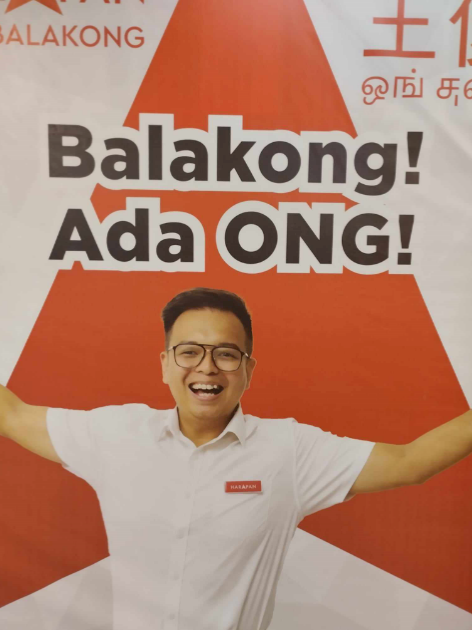
The 2023 Selangor state election campaign poster of Ong with the Malay slogan of "Balakong! Ada ONG!" (literally "Balakong Has Ong", referring to Ong contesting in Balakong) in his election operations centre in Balakong, Selangor, Malaysia.

== Personal life ==
Ong is married to his wife with children.

== Election results ==
Selangor State Legislative Assembly
Year	Constituency	Candidate	Votes	Pct	Opponent(s)	Votes	Pct	Ballots cast	Majority	Turnout
2023	N27 Balakong	Wayne Ong Chun Wei (DAP)	54,995	76.21%	Steven Lai Choon Wen (BERSATU)	17,163	23.79%	72,158	37,832	69.20%
