= Balakong (state constituency) =

State constituency in Selangor, Malaysia

Balakong (N27)
Selangor constituency

State constituency
- Legislature: Selangor State Legislative Assembly
MLA
Wayne Ong Chun Wei
PH
- Constituency created: 1994
- First contested: 1995
- Last contested: 2023

Demographics
- Electors (2023): 104,269

Balakong is a state constituency in Selangor, Malaysia, that has been represented in the Selangor State Legislative Assembly since 1995. It has been represented by Wayne Ong Chun Wei of Pakatan Harapan (PH) since 2023.

The state constituency was created in the 1994 redistribution and is mandated to return a single member to the Selangor State Legislative Assembly under the first past the post voting system.

== Demographics ==
Ethnic breakdown of Balakong's electorate as of 2023
1. Chinese (55.2%)
2. Malay (33.4%)
3. Indian (9.19%)
4. Other ethnicities (2.29%)

== History ==
=== Polling districts ===
According to the federal gazette issued on 30 March 2018, the Balakong constituency is divided into 18 polling districts.

State constituency	Polling districts	Code	Location
Balakong（N27）	Kampung Baharu Balakong	102/27/01	SJK (C) Balakong
Balakong（N27）	Bandar Damai Perdana	102/27/02	SJK (C) Connought 2
Balakong（N27）	Perimbun	102/27/03	SMK Perimbun
Balakong（N27）	Batu 11 Cheras	102/27/04	SJK (C) Batu Sebelas Cheras
Balakong（N27）	Cheras Perdana	102/27/05	SMK Cheras Perdana
Balakong（N27）	Bandar Tun Hussein Onn	102/27/06	SK Bandar Tun Hussein Onn
Balakong（N27）	Simpang Balak	102/27/07	SRA Sungai Balak
Balakong（N27）	Desa Baiduri	102/27/08	SK Desa Baiduri
Balakong（N27）	Cheras Jaya	102/27/09	SMK Cheras Jaya
Balakong（N27）	Taman Suria Jaya	102/27/10	SMK Bandar Tun Hussein Onn (2)
Balakong（N27）	Taman Sri Bahagia	102/27/11	SK Bandar Tun Hussein Onn (2)
Balakong（N27）	Balakong Jaya	102/27/12	Padang Bola Sepak, Pangsapuri Sri Pulai
Balakong（N27）	Taming Jaya	102/27/13	SK Taming Jaya
Balakong（N27）	Sungai Chua Satu	102/27/14	SJK (C) Sungai Chua
Balakong（N27）	Sungai Chua Dua	102/27/15	SJK (C) Sungai Chua
Balakong（N27）	Sungai Chua Tiga	102/27/16	Balai Raya JKKK Kampung Baru Sungai Chua
Balakong（N27）	Sungai Chua Empat	102/27/17	Pusat Rukun Tetangga Dan Tabika Perpaduan Sungai Chua B
Balakong（N27）	Sungai Chua Lima	102/27/18	Dewan Orang Ramai Sungai Chua

=== Representation history ===
Members of the Legislative Assembly for Balakong
Assembly	No	Years	Member	Party
Constituency created from Kajang
9th	N31	1995–1999	Hoh Hee Lee (何启利)	BN (MCA)
10th	N31	1999–2004	Hoh Hee Lee (何启利)	BN (MCA)
11th	N27	2004–2008	Hoh Hee Lee (何启利)	BN (MCA)
12th	N27	2008–2013	Yap Lum Chin (叶南进)	PR (DAP)
13th	N27	2013–2015	Eddie Ng Tien Chee (黃田志)	PR (DAP)
13th	N27	2015–2018	Eddie Ng Tien Chee (黃田志)	PH (DAP)
14th	N27	2018	Eddie Ng Tien Chee (黃田志)	PH (DAP)
14th	N27	2018–2023	Wong Siew Ki (王诗棋)	PH (DAP)
15th	N27	2023–present	Wayne Ong Chun Wei (王俊伟)	PH (DAP)

== Election results ==
Selangor state election, 2023
Party	Candidate	Votes	%	∆%
PH	Wayne Ong Chun Wei	54,995	76.21	▼8.78
PN	Steven Lai Choon Wen	17,163	23.79	▲23.79
Total valid votes		72,158	100.00	
Total rejected ballots		258		
Unreturned ballots		395		
Turnout		72,811	69.38	▲26.41
Registered electors		104,269		
Majority		37,832	52.42	▼17.56
PH hold		Swing		

Selangor state by-election, 8 September 2018 Upon the death of incumbent, Eddie Ng Tien Chee
Party	Candidate	Votes	%	∆%
PH	Wong Siew Ki	22,508	84.99	▲7.46
MCA	Tan Chee Teong	3,975	15.01	▲15.01
Total valid votes		26,483	100.00	
Total rejected ballots		227	0.86	
Unreturned ballots		24		
Turnout		26,734	42.97	▼45.21
Registered electors		62,219		
Majority		18,533	69.98	▲4.01
PH hold		Swing		
Source(s) "Federal Government Gazette - Notice of Contested Election - By-election of the State Legislative Assembly of N.27 Balakong for the State of Selangor [P.U. (B) 498/2018]" (PDF). Attorney General's Chambers of Malaysia. 20 August 2018. "Federal Government Gazette - Results of Contested Election and Statement of the Poll after the Official Addition of Votes for the By-election of N.27 Balakong [P.U. (B) 522/2018]" (PDF). Attorney General's Chambers of Malaysia. 12 September 2018.

Selangor state election, 2018
Party	Candidate	Votes	%	∆%
PKR	Eddie Ng Tien Chee	41,768	77.53	▲77.53
PAS	Mohamad Ibrahim Ghazali	6,230	11.56	▲11.56
BN	Lim Chin Wah	5,874	10.90	▼20.10
Total valid votes		53,872	100.00	
Total rejected ballots		286	0.53	
Unreturned ballots		226		
Turnout		54,384	88.20	▼0.54
Registered electors		61,659		
Majority		35,538	65.97	▲29.72
PKR hold		Swing		

Selangor state election, 2013
Party	Candidate	Votes	%	∆%
DAP	Eddie Ng Tien Chee	25,126	67.25	▲6.29
BN	Lai Kwong Choy	11,584	31.00	▼8.04
Independent	Lee Ah Seng	653	1.75	▲1.75
Total valid votes		37,363	100.00	
Total rejected ballots		548	1.44	
Unreturned ballots		94		
Turnout		38,005	88.74	▲11.03
Registered electors		42,829		
Majority		13,542	36.25	▲14.33
DAP hold		Swing		
Source(s) "Federal Government Gazette - Notice of Contested Election, State Legislative Assembly for the State of Selangor [P.U. (B) 192/2013]" (PDF). Attorney General's Chambers of Malaysia. 26 April 2013. Archived from the original (PDF) on 29 December 2019. "Federal Government Gazette - Results of Contested Election and Statements of the Poll after the Official Addition of Votes, State Constituencies for the State of Selangor [P.U. (B) 233/2013]" (PDF). Attorney General's Chambers of Malaysia. 22 May 2013. Archived from the original (PDF) on 2 October 2018.

Selangor state election, 2008
Party	Candidate	Votes	%	∆%
DAP	Yap Lum Chin	13,335	60.96	▲23.66
BN	Lai Kwong Choy	8,540	39.04	▼23.66
Total valid votes		21,875	100.00	
Total rejected ballots		357		
Unreturned ballots		56		
Turnout		22,288	77.71	▲3.80
Registered electors		28,682		
Majority		4,795	21.92	▼3.48
DAP gain from BN		Swing		?

Selangor state election, 2004
Party	Candidate	Votes	%	∆%
BN	Hoh Hee Lee	10,289	62.70	▲10.58
DAP	Ong Ing Siong	6,121	37.30	▼10.58
Total valid votes		16,410	100.00	
Total rejected ballots		327		
Unreturned ballots		27		
Turnout		16,764	73.91	▼3.44
Registered electors		22,683		
Majority		4,168	25.40	▲21.16
BN hold		Swing		

Selangor state election, 1999
Party	Candidate	Votes	%	∆%
BN	Hoh Hee Lee	10,801	52.12	▼8.93
DAP	Foo Shu Seong	9,924	47.88	▲8.93
Total valid votes		20,725	100.00	
Total rejected ballots		400		
Unreturned ballots		12		
Turnout		21,137	77.35	
Registered electors		27,325		
Majority		877	4.24	
BN hold		Swing		

Selangor state election, 1995
Party	Candidate	Votes	%
BN	Hoh Hee Lee	10,605	61.05
DAP	Teong Shyan Chyuan	6,767	38.95
Total valid votes		17,372	100.00
Total rejected ballots		506	
Unreturned ballots		20	
Turnout		17,898	77.43
Registered electors		23,114	
Majority		3,838	22.10
New constituency created.
