= Lee Chin Cheh =

Malaysian politician

Chinese name
- Traditional Chinese: 李景傑
Transcriptions
Standard Mandarin
- Hanyu Pinyin: Lǐ Jǐngjié
- Wade–Giles: Li3 Ching3 Chieh2
Yue: Cantonese
- Jyutping: Lei5 Ging2 Git6
Southern Min
- Hokkien POJ: Lí Kéng-kia̍t
- Tâi-lô: Lí Kíng-kia̍t

Lee Chin Cheh (simplified Chinese: 李景杰; traditional Chinese: 李景傑; pinyin: Lǐ Jǐngjié; Jyutping: Lei5 Ging2 Git6; Pe̍h-ōe-jī: Lí Kéng-kia̍t) is a Malaysian politician and the former Selangor state assemblyman of the Kajang seat. He became infamous for vacating his seat at Kajang on 27 January 2014.

== Kajang Move ==
In the general elections in 2013, he won by a majority of 6,824 votes against 5 other candidates .

The first stage of the "Kajang Move" was a by-election held for the Selangor State Assembly seat of Kajang on 23 March 2014. The seat was vacated after the incumbent PKR assemblyman, Lee Chin Cheh resigned on 27 January 2014. Lee had won the seat by a majority of 6,824 votes, against five other candidates, in the 2013 election.
