= Serdang (Selangor state constituency) =

Selangor constituency

Defunct state constituency
- Legislature: Selangor State Legislative Assembly
- Constituency created: 1958
- Constituency abolished: 1995
- First contested: 1959
- Last contested: 1990

Serdang was a state constituency in Selangor, Malaysia, that was represented in the Selangor State Legislative Assembly from 1959 to 1995.

The state constituency was created in the 1958 redistribution and was mandated to return a single member to the Selangor State Legislative Assembly under the first past the post voting system.

== History ==
It was abolished in 1995 when it was redistributed.

=== Representation history ===
Members of the Legislative Assembly for Serdang
Assembly	No	Years	Member	Party
Constituency created
1st	N17	1959-1964	Karam Singh Veriah	SF (Ra'ayat)
2nd	N17	1964-1968	Chin Kek Kum (曾國幹)	SF (Ra'ayat)
2nd	N17	1968-1969	Thuan Paik Phok (莊迪福)	Alliance (MCA)
		1969-1971	Assembly dissolved	
3rd	N17	1971-1974	Yap Pian Hon (葉炳漢)	DAP
4th	N27	1974-1978	Yap Pian Hon (葉炳漢)	BN (MCA)
5th	N27	1978-1982	Lee Lam Thye (李霖泰)	DAP
6th	N27	1982-1986	Yap Pian Hon (葉炳漢)	BN (MCA)
7th	N30	1986-1990	Yap Pian Hon (葉炳漢)	BN (MCA)
8th	N30	1990-1995	Yap Pian Hon (葉炳漢)	BN (MCA)
Constituency abolished, split into Seri Kembangan and Pucung

== Election results ==
Selangor state election, 1990
Party	Candidate	Votes	%	∆%
BN	Yap Pian Hon	12,938	53.99	▼7.28
DAP	Pan Su Peng	11,025	46.01	▲7.28
Total valid votes		23,963	100.00	
Total rejected ballots		717		
Unreturned ballots		409		
Turnout		25,089	76.06	▲7.55
Registered electors		32,986		
Majority		1,913	7.98	▼14.57
BN hold		Swing		

Selangor state election, 1986
Party	Candidate	Votes	%	∆%
BN	Yap Pian Hon	11,367	61.27	▼1.89
DAP	Pan Su Peng	7,184	38.73	▲1.89
Total valid votes		18,551	100.00	
Total rejected ballots		273		
Unreturned ballots		0		
Turnout		18,824	68.51	▼9.10
Registered electors		27,476		
Majority		4,183	22.55	▼3.79
BN hold		Swing		

Selangor state election, 1982
Party	Candidate	Votes	%	∆%
BN	Yap Pian Hon	9,753	63.17	▲16.16
DAP	Fong Kui Lun	5,687	36.83	▼16.16
Total valid votes		15,440	100.00	
Total rejected ballots		460		
Unreturned ballots		0		
Turnout		15,900	77.61	▼2.91
Registered electors		20,488		
Majority		4,066	26.33	▲20.34
BN gain from DAP		Swing		?

Selangor state election, 1978
Party	Candidate	Votes	%	∆%
DAP	Lee Lam Thye	6,554	53.00	▲15.11
BN	Yap Pian Hon	5,813	47.00	▲1.21
Total valid votes		12,367	100.00	
Total rejected ballots		555		
Unreturned ballots		0		
Turnout		12,922	80.52	▲2.29
Registered electors		16,049		
Majority		741	5.99	▼1.92
DAP gain from BN		Swing		?

Selangor state election, 1974
Party	Candidate	Votes	%	∆%
BN	Yap Pian Hon	3,584	45.80	▲4.45
DAP	Lee Lam Thye	2,965	37.89	▼20.76
Independent	Ching Tow Fah	980	12.52	▲12.52
PEKEMAS	Pang Kuik My	297	3.80	▲3.80
Total valid votes		7,826	100.00	
Total rejected ballots		425		
Unreturned ballots		0		
Turnout		8,251	78.23	▲8.09
Registered electors		10,547		
Majority		619	7.91	▼9.39
BN gain from DAP		Swing		?

Selangor state election, 1969
Party	Candidate	Votes	%	∆%
DAP	Yap Pian Hon	11,234	58.65	▲15.67
Alliance	Thuan Paik Phok	7,920	41.35	▼6.03
Total valid votes		19,154	100.00	
Total rejected ballots		903		
Unreturned ballots		0		
Turnout		20,057	70.14	▲11.74
Registered electors		28,595		
Majority		3,314	17.30	▲12.90
DAP gain from Alliance		Swing		?

Selangor state by-election, 28 December 1968 Upon the death of incumbent, Chin Kek Kum
Party	Candidate	Votes	%	∆%
Alliance	Thuan Paik Phok	6,535	47.38	▲4.02
DAP	Lim Kit Siang	5,928	42.98	▲42.98
GERAKAN	Tan Han Swee	1,330	9.64	▲9.64
Total valid votes		13,793	100.00	
Total rejected ballots		211		
Unreturned ballots		0		
Turnout		14,004	58.40	▼15.46
Registered electors		23,978		
Majority		607	4.40	▼8.87
Alliance gain from Socialist Front		Swing		?

Selangor state election, 1964
Party	Candidate	Votes	%	∆%
Socialist Front	Chin Kek Kum	7,621	56.64	▼2.93
Alliance	Ching Tow Fah	5,835	43.36	▲2.93
Total valid votes		13,456	100.00	
Total rejected ballots		593		
Unreturned ballots				
Turnout		14,049	73.806	
Registered electors		19,021		
Majority		1,786		
Socialist Front hold		Swing		

Selangor state election, 1959
Party	Candidate	Votes	%	∆%
Socialist Front	Karam Singh Veriah	5,883	59.56	
Alliance	Chan Chee Hong	3,994	40.44	
Total valid votes		9,877	100.00	
Total rejected ballots		207		
Unreturned ballots		0		
Turnout		10,084	74.69	
Registered electors		13,502		
Majority		1,889	19.13	
This was a new constituency created.
