= Kajang (state constituency) =

State constituency in Selangor, Malaysia

Kajang (N25)
Selangor constituency

State constituency
- Legislature: Selangor State Legislative Assembly
MLA
David Cheong Kian Young
PH
- Constituency created: 1958
- First contested: 1959
- Last contested: 2023

Demographics
- Population (2020): 236,240
- Electors (2023): 109,785

Kajang is a state constituency in Selangor, Malaysia, that has been represented in the Selangor State Legislative Assembly since 1959. It has been represented by David Cheong Kian Young of Pakatan Harapan (PH) since 2023.

The state constituency was created in the 1958 redistribution and is mandated to return a single member to the Selangor State Legislative Assembly under the first past the post voting system.

== Demographics ==
Ethnic breakdown of Kajang's electorate as of 2023
1. Chinese (43.4%)
2. Malay (39.0%)
3. Indian (14.3%)
4. Other ethnicities (3.20%)

== History ==
=== Polling districts ===
According to the federal gazette issued on 30 March 2018, the Kajang constituency is divided into 21 polling districts.

State constituency	Polling districts	Code	Location
Kajang (N25)	Sungai Sekamat	102/25/01	SK Seri Sekamat
Kajang (N25)	Saujana Impian	102/25/02	SK Saujana Impian
Kajang (N25)	Taman Mesra	102/25/03	SMA Persekutuan Kajang
Kajang (N25)	Sungai Kantan	102/25/04	SK Sungai Kantan
Kajang (N25)	Taman Kajang Baharu	102/25/05	SMK Tinggi Kajang
Kajang (N25)	Kajang	102/25/06	SMK Convent
Kajang (N25)	Taman Delima	102/25/07	SMK Saujana Impian
Kajang (N25)	Bandar Kajang	102/25/08	SK Kajang
Kajang (N25)	Bandar Sungai Long	102/25/09	SMK Bandar Baru Sungai Long
Kajang (N25)	Bandar Mahkota	102/25/10	SMK Bandar Baru Sungai Long
Kajang (N25)	Taman Rakan	102/25/11	SK Taman Rakan
Kajang (N25)	Taman Asa Jaya	102/25/12	SA Rakyat An-Nur
Kajang (N25)	Kajang Perdana	102/25/13	KAFA Integrasi Al-Asmah
Kajang (N25)	Sungai Jeluk	102/25/14	SK Sri Jelok
Kajang (N25)	Taman Bukit Mewah	102/25/15	SMK Jalan Bukit Kajang
Kajang (N25)	Reko Utara	102/25/16	SK Jalan Bukit (Satu)
Kajang (N25)	Taman Jasmin	102/25/17	SK Taman Jasmin
Kajang (N25)	Reko Selatan	102/25/18	SJK (T) West Country (Timur)
Kajang (N25)	Taman Kajang Mewah	102/25/19	KAFA Integrasi Miftahuddin
Kajang (N25)	Bukit Kajang Baru	102/25/20	Dewan Orang Ramai Taman Bukit Mewah
Kajang (N25)	Kajang Prima	102/25/21	SMK Taman Jasmin 2

=== Representation history ===
Members of the Legislative Assembly for Kajang
Assembly	No	Years	Member	Party
Constituency created
1st	N09	1959–1964	Mustafa Yunus	Alliance (UMNO)
2nd	N09	1964–1969	Mohamed Nazir Abdul Jalil	Alliance (UMNO)
		1969–1971	Assembly dissolved	
3rd	N09	1971–1973	Mohamed Nazir Abdul Jalil	Alliance (UMNO)
3rd	N09	1973	Mohamed Nazir Abdul Jalil	BN (UMNO)
3rd	N09	1973–1974	Mohamed Azmir Mohamed Nazir	BN (UMNO)
4th	N18	1974–1978	Lee Teck Su (李德恕)	Independent
5th	N18	1978–1982	Liew Ah Kim (廖金华)	DAP
6th	N18	1982–1986	Lim Ann Koon (林安焜)	BN (MCA)
7th	N24	1986–1990	Chan Kok Kit (陈国杰)	DAP
8th	N24	1990–1995	Tan Seng Giaw (陈胜尧)	GR (DAP)
9th	N23	1995–1999	Choong Tow Chong (钟道昌)	BN (MCA)
10th	N23	1999–2004	Shafie Abu Bakar	BA (PAS)
11th	N25	2004–2008	Low Lee Leng (刘丽玲)	BN (MCA)
12th	N25	2008–2013	Lee Kim Sin (李成金)	PR (PKR)
13th	N25	2013–2014	Lee Chin Cheh (李景杰)	PR (PKR)
13th	N25	2014–2015	Wan Azizah Wan Ismail	PR (PKR)
13th	N25	2015–2018	Wan Azizah Wan Ismail	PH (PKR)
14th	N25	2018–2023	Hee Loy Sian (许來贤)	PH (PKR)
15th	N25	2023–present	David Cheong Kian Young (张睷洋)	PH (PKR)

== Election results ==
Selangor state election, 2023
Party	Candidate	Votes	%	∆%
PH	David Cheong Kian Young	54,794	70.36	▼1.39
PN	Allan Liew Sin Kim	20,400	26.20	▲26.20
Parti Sosialis Malaysia	Arutchelvan Subramaniam	2,681	3.44	▲3.44
Total valid votes		77,875	100.00	
Total rejected ballots		358		
Unreturned ballots		114		
Turnout		78,347	71.36	▼17.24
Registered electors		109,785		
Majority		34,394	44.16	▼12.21
PH hold		Swing		

Selangor state election, 2018
Party	Candidate	Votes	%	∆%
PKR	Hee Loy Sian	39,158	71.75	▲12.18
PAS	Zaiton Ahmad	8,300	15.21	▲15.21
BN	Teh Yeow Meng	7,097	13.01	▼27.42
Parti Rakyat Malaysia	Wan Jinn Woei	103	0.19	▲0.19
Total valid votes		54,555	100.00	
Total rejected ballots		375		
Unreturned ballots		153		
Turnout		55,083	88.60	▲16.51
Registered electors		62,170		
Majority		30,858	56.37	▲37.23
PKR hold		Swing		

Selangor state by-election, 23 March 2014 Upon the resignation of incumbent, Lee Chin Cheh
Party	Candidate	Votes	%	∆%
PKR	Wan Azizah Wan Ismail	16,741	59.57	▲1.58
BN	Chew Mei Fun	11,362	40.43	▲2.66
Total valid votes		28,103	100.00	
Total rejected ballots		176		
Unreturned ballots		38		
Turnout		28,317	72.09	▼16.28
Registered electors		39,278		
Majority		5,379	19.14	▲5.04
PKR hold		Swing		
Source(s) "Pilihan Raya Kecil N.25 Kajang". Election Commission of Malaysia. "Federal Government Gazette - Notice of Contested Election - By-election of the State Legislative Assembly of N.25 Kajang for the State of Selangor [P.U. (B) 86/2014]" (PDF). Attorney General's Chambers of Malaysia. 12 March 2014. Archived from the original (PDF) on 2019-12-29. "Federal Government Gazette - Results of Contested Election and Statement of the Poll after the Official Addition of Votes for the By-election of N.25 Kajang [P.U. (B) 113/2014]" (PDF). Attorney General's Chambers of Malaysia. 1 April 2014. Archived from the original (PDF) on 2017-05-10.

Selangor state election, 2013
Party	Candidate	Votes	%	∆%
PKR	Lee Chin Cheh	19,571	57.99	▲0.94
BN	Lee Ban Seng	12,747	37.77	▼5.18
Pan-Malaysian Islamic Front	Mohamad Ismail	1,014	3.00	▲3.00
Independent	Mohd Iwan Jefry Abdul Majid	249	0.74	▲0.74
Independent	Ong Yan Foo	85	0.25	▲0.25
Independent	Mohd Khalid Kassim	83	0.25	▲0.25
Total valid votes		33,749	100.00	
Total rejected ballots		541		
Unreturned ballots		142		
Turnout		34,432	88.37	▲8.61
Registered electors		38,965		
Majority		6,824	20.22	▲6.12
PKR hold		Swing		
Source(s) "Federal Government Gazette - Notice of Contested Election, State Legislative Assembly for the State of Selangor [P.U. (B) 192/2013]" (PDF). Attorney General's Chambers of Malaysia. 26 April 2013. Archived from the original (PDF) on 2019-12-29. "Federal Government Gazette - Results of Contested Election and Statements of the Poll after the Official Addition of Votes, State Constituencies for the State of Selangor [P.U. (B) 233/2013]". Attorney General's Chambers of Malaysia. 22 May 2013. Archived from the original (PDF) on 2018-10-02.

Selangor state election, 2008
Party	Candidate	Votes	%	∆%
PKR	Lee Kim Sin	13,220	57.05	▲13.99
BN	Low Lee Leng	9,952	42.95	▼13.99
Total valid votes		23,172	100.00	
Total rejected ballots		560		
Unreturned ballots		91		
Turnout		23,823	79.76	▲3.75
Registered electors		29,868		
Majority		3,268	14.10	▲0.22
PKR gain from BN		Swing		?

Selangor state election, 2004
Party	Candidate	Votes	%	∆%
BN	Low Lee Leng	11,380	56.94	▲6.86
PKR	Lee Kim Sin	8,607	43.06	▲43.06
Total valid votes		19,987	100.00	
Total rejected ballots		524		
Unreturned ballots				
Turnout		20,511	76.01	▲0.41
Registered electors		26,984		
Majority		2,773	13.88	▲13.72
BN gain from PAS		Swing		?

Selangor state election, 1999
Party	Candidate	Votes	%	∆%
PAS	Shafie Abu Bakar	10,922	50.08	▲21.19
BN	Choong Tow Chong	10,885	49.92	▼21.29
Total valid votes		21,807	100.00	
Total rejected ballots		279		
Unreturned ballots		110		
Turnout		22,196	75.60	▲5.60
Registered electors		29,360		
Majority		37	0.16	▼42.06
PAS gain from BN		Swing		?

Selangor state election, 1995
Party	Candidate	Votes	%	∆%
BN	Choong Tow Chong	12,976	71.11	▲33.06
PAS	Safie Ibrahim	5,271	28.89	▲28.89
Total valid votes		18,247	100.00	
Total rejected ballots		439		
Unreturned ballots		126		
Turnout		18,812	70.00	▼5.99
Registered electors		26,876		
Majority		7,705	42.22	▲18.32
BN gain from DAP		Swing		?

Selangor state election, 1990
Party	Candidate	Votes	%	∆%
DAP	Tan Seng Giaw	10,138	61.95	▲9.12
BN	Khoo Chai Hong	6,227	38.05	▼3.78
Total valid votes		16,365	100.00	
Total rejected ballots		427		
Unreturned ballots		0		
Turnout		16,856	75.99	▲0.19
Registered electors		22,182		
Majority		3,911	23.90	▲12.90
DAP hold		Swing		

Selangor state election, 1986
Party	Candidate	Votes	%	∆%
DAP	Chan Kok Kit	7,930	52.83	▲11.22
BN	Chang Sze Hoi	6,279	41.83	▼16.56
PAS	Maido Ali	540	3.60	▲3.60
SDP	Chong Poy Seng	139	0.93	▲0.93
Independent	V. N. Hari Krishnan Narayanasamy	121	0.81	
Total valid votes		15,009	100.00	
Total rejected ballots		323		
Unreturned ballots		0		
Turnout		15,332	75.80	▼1.31
Registered electors		20,226		
Majority		1,651	11.00	▼5.78
DAP gain from BN		Swing		?

Selangor state election, 1982
Party	Candidate	Votes	%	∆%
BN	Lim Ann Koon	8,494	58.39	▲22.48
DAP	Ean Yong Tin Sin	6,053	41.61	▼15.34
Total valid votes		14,547	100.00	
Total rejected ballots		214		
Unreturned ballots		0		
Turnout		14,761	77.11	▼1.67
Registered electors		19,144		
Majority		2,441	16.78	▼4.26
BN gain from DAP		Swing		?

Selangor state election, 1978
Party	Candidate	Votes	%	∆%
DAP	Liew Ah Kim	6,841	56.95	▲47.41
BN	Kan Tong Fong	4,313	35.91	▼4.62
Parti Rakyat Malaysia	Kampo Radjo	550	4.58	▲4.58
PEKEMAS	Aman Khan	308	2.56	▼3.83
Total valid votes		12,012	100.00	
Total rejected ballots		362		
Unreturned ballots		0		
Turnout		12,374	78.78	▲13.09
Registered electors		15,708		
Majority		2,528	21.04	▼18.42
DAP gain from Independent		Swing		?

Selangor state election, 1974
Party	Candidate	Votes	%	∆%
Independent	Lee Teck Su	3,775	43.44	▲43.44
BN	Tan Kui Sui @ Tan Kai See	3,531	40.63	▼21.6
DAP	Hor Cheok Foon	829	9.54	▼5.47
PEKEMAS	Aman Khan	555	6.39	▼16.38
Total valid votes		8,690	100.00	
Total rejected ballots		526		
Unreturned ballots		0		
Turnout		9,216	80.45	▲14.76
Registered electors		11,456		
Majority		244	2.81	▼36.65
Independent gain from Alliance		Swing		?

Selangor state by-election, 3 November 1973 Upon the death of incumbent, Dato' Mohd Nazir bin Abdul Jalil
Party	Candidate	Votes	%	∆%
Alliance	Dato' Mohd Azmir bin Mohd Nazir	6,481	62.23	▲8.66
PEKEMAS	Azainuddin Karim	2,371	22.77	▲22.77
DAP	Mohamed Yunus Said	1,563	15.01	▲15.01
Total valid votes		10,415	100.00	
Total rejected ballots		200		
Unreturned ballots		0		
Turnout		10,615	65.69	▼2.25
Registered electors		16,159		
Majority		4,110	39.46	▲32.32
Alliance hold		Swing		

Selangor state election, 1969
Party	Candidate	Votes	%	∆%
Alliance	Dato' Mohd Nazir bin Abdul Jalil	5,022	53.57	▼17.60
GERAKAN	Loh Chee Foon	4,352	46.43	▲46.43
Total valid votes		9,374	100.00	
Total rejected ballots		701		
Unreturned ballots		0		
Turnout		10,075	67.94	▼11.43
Registered electors		14,830		
Majority		670	7.14	▼35.20
Alliance hold		Swing		

Selangor state election, 1964
Party	Candidate	Votes	%	∆%
Alliance	Dato Mohd Nazir Bin Abdul Jalil	6,036	71.17	▲25.27
Socialist Front	Tajuddin Abdul Kahar	2,445	28.83	▼1.45
Total valid votes		8,481	100.00	
Total rejected ballots		673		
Unreturned ballots		0		
Turnout		9,154	79.37	▲1.77
Registered electors		11,534		
Majority		3,591	42.34	▲26.64
Alliance hold		Swing		

Selangor state election, 1959
Party	Candidate	Votes	%
Alliance	Mustafa Yunus	3,180	45.90
Socialist Front	Yahaya Hussain	2,098	30.28
National Party	Dato Mohd Nazir Bin Abdul Jalil	1,650	23.82
Total valid votes		6,928	100.00
Total rejected ballots		109	
Unreturned ballots		0	
Turnout		7,037	77.60
Registered electors		9,068	
Majority		1,082	15.70
This was a new constituency created.
