= Ean Yong Hian Wah =

Malaysian politician and businessman

- 欧阳捍华

Chairman of the Port Klang Authority
- Incumbent
- Assumed office 21 August 2023
- Minister: Anthony Loke
- Preceded by: Chong Sin Woon
- In office 18 May 2019 – 1 April 2020
- Minister: Anthony Loke (2019–2020); Wee Ka Siong (10 March–1 April 2020)
- Succeeded by: Chong Sin Woon

Member of the Selangor State Executive Council (Local Government, New Villages Development & Illegal Factories Legalisation)
- In office 27 September 2014 – 13 May 2018
- Monarch: Sharafuddin
- Menteri Besar: Azmin Ali
- Preceded by: Himself
- Succeeded by: Ng Sze Han (Local Government & New Villages Development); Portfolio abolished (Illegal Factories Legalisation)
- Constituency: Seri Kembangan
- In office 30 May 2013 – 12 August 2014
- Monarch: Sharafuddin
- Menteri Besar: Khalid Ibrahim
- Preceded by: Himself
- Succeeded by: Himself
- Constituency: Seri Kembangan
- In office 24 March 2008 – 14 May 2013
- Monarch: Sharafuddin
- Menteri Besar: Khalid Ibrahim
- Succeeded by: Himself
- Constituency: Seri Kembangan

Executive Chairman of the Orgabio Holdings Berhad
- Incumbent
- Assumed office 1 March 2024
- Deputy: Ean Yong Tin Sin
- Preceded by: Teh Chee Ghee

Member of the Selangor State Legislative Assembly for Seri Kembangan
- In office 8 March 2008 – 12 August 2023
- Preceded by: Liew Yuen Keong (BN–MCA)
- Succeeded by: Wong Siew Ki (PH–DAP)
- Majority: 7,244 (2008); 22,078 (2013); 31,145 (2018)

State Vice Chairman of the Democratic Action Party of Selangor
- Incumbent
- Assumed office 10 November 2024 Serving with Ng Suee Lim
- Secretary-General: Anthony Loke Siew Fook
- State Chairman: Ng Sze Han
- Preceded by: Ganabatirau Veraman

State Deputy Chairman of the Democratic Action Party of Selangor
- In office 9 December 2018 – 10 November 2024
- Secretary-General: Lim Guan Eng (2018–2022); Anthony Loke Siew Fook (2022–2024)
- State Chairman: Gobind Singh Deo
- Preceded by: Gobind Singh Deo
- Succeeded by: Ganabatirau Veraman

State Secretary of the Democratic Action Party of Selangor
- In office 28 November 2010 – 9 December 2018
- Assistant: Ng Suee Lim
- Secretary-General: Lim Guan Eng
- State Chairman: Teresa Kok Suh Sim (2010–2013); Tony Pua Kiam Wee (2013–2018)
- Succeeded by: Ronnie Liu Tian Khiew

State Chairman of the Democratic Action Party of Selangor
- In office 12 January 2007 – 28 November 2010
- Deputy: Tony Pua Kiam Wee
- Secretary-General: Lim Guan Eng
- Preceded by: Ong Chee Keng
- Succeeded by: Teresa Kok Suh Sim

Personal details
- Born: Ean Yong Hian Wah; 1980 (age 45–46) Kajang, Selangor, Malaysia
- Citizenship: Malaysian
- Party: Democratic Action Party (DAP)
- Other political affiliations: Barisan Alternatif (1999–2004); Pakatan Rakyat (PR) (2008–2015); Pakatan Harapan (PH) (since 2015)
- Relations: Ean Yong Hien Voon; Ean Yong Hen Loen; Ean Yong Hien Chal; Ean Yong Han Khian; Ean Yong Sik Sew; (siblings)
- Parent: Ean Yong Tin Sin (father)
- Education: New Era University College; University of Bradford (Bachelor's degree in business administration & diploma in administration and trade)
- Occupation: Politician; businessman

Ean Yong Hian Wah

Chinese name
- Traditional Chinese: 歐陽捍華
- Simplified Chinese: 欧阳捍华
Transcriptions
Standard Mandarin
- Hanyu Pinyin: Ōuyáng Hànhuá

Ean Yong Hian Wah (simplified Chinese: 欧阳捍华; traditional Chinese: 歐陽捍華; pinyin: Ōuyáng Hànhuá; born 1980) is a Malaysian politician and businessman who has served as Chairman of the Port Klang Authority (PKA) since August 2023 and from May 2019 to his removal from the position in April 2020 and Executive Chairman of the Orgabio Holdings Berhad since March 2024. He served as Member of the Selangor State Executive Council (EXCO) in the Pakatan Rakyat (PR) and Pakatan Harapan (PH) state administrations under former Menteris Besar Khalid Ibrahim and Azmin Ali from March 2008 to May 2018 and Member of the Selangor State Legislative Assembly (MLA) for Seri Kembangan from March 2008 to August 2023. He is a member of the Democratic Action Party (DAP), a component party of the PH and formerly PR as well as Barisan Alternatif (BA) coalitions. He has served as the State Vice Chairman of DAP of Selangor since November 2024. He served as the State Deputy Chairman from December 2018 to his demotion to the Vice Chairman in November 2024, State Secretary from November 2010 to his promotion to the Deputy Chairman in December 2018 and prior to his promotion to the Chairman in January 2007, Chairman from January 2007 to his demotion to Secretary in November 2010. He is also the son of Ean Yong Tin Sin, the former MLA of Negeri Sembilan for Lukut.

== Political career ==
=== Member of the Selangor State Executive Council (2008–2018) ===
Ean Yong was appointed as the Selangor EXCO Member in charge of Local Government, New Villages Development and Illegal Factories Legalisation by former Menteris Besar Khalid and Azmin.

=== Member of the Selangor State Legislative Assembly (2008–2023) ===
==== 2004 Selangor state election ====
In the 2004 Selangor state election, Ean Yong made his electoral debut after being nominated by BA to contest for the Kampung Tunku state seat. He was not elected to the Selangor State Legislative Assembly as the Kampung Tunku MLA after losing to defending MLA Wong Sai Hou of Barisan Nasional (BN) by a minority of 3,612 votes.

==== 2008 Selangor state election ====
In the 2008 Selangor state election Ean Yong was renominated by PR to contest for the Seri Kembangan state seat. Ean Yong won the seat and was elected to the Selangor State Legislative Assembly as the Seri Kembangan MLA for the first term after defeating defending MLA Liew Yuen Keong of BN and independent candidate Wong Kok Yew by a majority of 7,244 votes.

==== 2013 Selangor state election ====
In the 2013 Selangor state election Ean Yong was renominated by PR to defend the Seri Kembangan seat. Ean Yong defended the seat and was reelected to the Selangor State Legislative Assembly as the Seri Kembangan MLA for the second term after defeating Chin Toong Kang of BN by a majority of 22,078 votes.

==== 2018 Selangor state election ====
In the 2018 Selangor state election Ean Yong was renominated by PH to defend the Seri Kembangan seat. Ean Yong defended the seat and was reelected to the Selangor State Legislative Assembly as the Seri Kembangan MLA for the third term after defeating Chan Toong Woh of BN by a majority of 31,145 votes.

==== 2023 Selangor state election ====
In the 2023 Selangor state election Ean Yong was not nominated by PH to defend the Seri Kembangan seat and contest for other seats after he had decided against doing so.

== Controversies and issues ==
At about 12.10 am on 6 April 2012 Ean Yong was injured and punched by two men he knew after attending a discussion and having dinner at a restaurant in Jalan Sekolah, Kampung Baru, Seri Kembangan, Selangor. It was understood that the incident stemmed from the dissatisfaction with the action of the state government of Selangor and the Subang Jaya Municipal Council (MPSJ) to relocate the illegal traders and hawkers of the Seri Kembangan old market to the public market on Jalan SK 6/1.

== Election results ==
Selangor State Legislative Assembly
Year	Constituency	Candidate	Votes	Pct	Opponent(s)	Votes	Pct	Ballots cast	Majority	Turnout
2004	N35 Kampung Tunku	Ean Yong Hian Wah (DAP)	8,367	41.12%	Wong Sai Hou (MCA)	11,979	58.88%	20,346	3,612	66.77%
2008	N28 Seri Kembangan	Ean Yong Hian Wah (DAP)	15,841	64.05%	Liew Yuen Keong (MCA)	8,597	34.76%	24,732	7,244	82.94%
2008	N28 Seri Kembangan	Ean Yong Hian Wah (DAP)	15,841	64.05%	Wong Kok Yew (IND)	294	1.19%	24,732	7,244	82.94%
2013	N28 Seri Kembangan	Ean Yong Hian Wah (DAP)	27,406	83.72%	Chan Toong Kang (MCA)	5,328	16.28%	32,734	22,078	89.54%
2018	N28 Seri Kembangan	Ean Yong Hian Wah (DAP)	34,659	90.79%	Chan Toong Woh (MCA)	3,514	9.21%	38,173	31,145	89.47%
