= Pandan (federal constituency) =

Federal constituency of Selangor, Malaysia

Pandan (P100)
Selangor constituency

Federal constituency
- Legislature: Dewan Rakyat
- MP: Vacant
- Constituency created: 2003
- First contested: 2004
- Last contested: 2022

Demographics
- Population (2020): 227,413
- Electors (2023): 150,355
- Area (km²): 20
- Pop. density (per km²): 11,370.7

Pandan is a federal constituency in Hulu Langat District, Selangor, Malaysia, that has been represented in the Dewan Rakyat since 2004.

The federal constituency was created from parts of the Ampang Jaya constituency in the 2003 redistribution and is mandated to return a single member to the Dewan Rakyat under the first past the post voting system.

== Demographics ==
Ethnic breakdown of Pandan's electorate as of 2023
1. Chinese (47.2%)
2. Malay (40.0%)
3. Indian (7.90%)
4. Other ethnicities (4.97%)
Age breakdown of Pandan's electorate as of 2023
1. 18-20 (5.58%)
2. 21-29 (20.2%)
3. 30-39 (22.6%)
4. 40-49 (18.4%)
5. 50-59 (16.0%)
6. 60-69 (11.7%)
7. 70-79 (4.31%)
8. 80-89 (1.06%)
9. above 90 (0.12%)
Gender breakdown of Pandan's electorate as of 2023
1. Male (49.3%)
2. Female (50.7%)

== History ==
=== Polling districts ===
According to the gazette issued on18 July 2023, the Pandan constituency has a total of 34 polling districts.

State constituency	Polling districts	Code	Location
Pandan Indah (N21)	Taman Nirwana	100/21/01	SK Taman Nirwana, Ampang (Pintu B)
Pandan Indah (N21)	Angsana Hilir	100/21/02	SRA Jalan F Kampung Pandan Dalam
Pandan Indah (N21)	Kampung Pandan Dalam Kiri	100/21/03	SRA Kampung Pandan Dalam Lorang Bahagia Lima
Pandan Indah (N21)	Lorong Raya Kampung Pandan	100/21/04	Dewan MPAJ Jalan H Kampung Pandan
Pandan Indah (N21)	Pandan Jaya Utara	100/21/05	SK Pandan Jaya
Pandan Indah (N21)	Taman Chempaka	100/21/06	Dewan Seberguna Taman Cempaka
Pandan Indah (N21)	Pandan Indah Jalan 1, 4 dan 6	100/21/07	SRA Pandan Indah; Maahad Integrasi Selangor Pandan Indah
Pandan Indah (N21)	Lorong Molek Kampung Pandan	100/21/08	SRA Jalan F Kampung Pandan Dalam
Pandan Indah (N21)	Lorong Bersih Kampung Pandan	100/21/09	Padang Awan Jalan H, Kampung Pandan
Pandan Indah (N21)	Pandan Jaya Selatan	100/21/10	SMK Pandan Jaya
Pandan Indah (N21)	Taman Bakti	100/21/11	Dewan Seberguna Taman Cempaka
Pandan Indah (N21)	Pandan Indah Jalan 2 & 3	100/21/12	SMK Pandan Indah
Pandan Indah (N21)	Ampang Hilir	100/21/13	Kompleks Muhibah Ampang Jaya
Pandan Indah (N21)	Cheras Indah	100/21/14	SK Cheras Indah
Pandan Indah (N21)	Taman Maju Jaya	100/21/15	SA Kelas Al-Quran & Fardhu Ain (KAFA) Integrasi Al-Mustaqimah Taman Cheras Indah
Pandan Indah (N21)	Taman Kenchana	100/21/16	SK Taman Muda (Pintu A)
Pandan Indah (N21)	Kampung Cheras Bahru Timur	100/21/17	SK Kampong Cheras Bahru (Pintu A)
Pandan Indah (N21)	Desa Nirwana	100/21/18	Kompleks Muhibah Ampang Jaya
Teratai (N22)	Pandan Perdana Timur	100/22/01	SK Pandan Perdana
Teratai (N22)	Taman Muda Timur	100/22/02	SK Taman Muda (Pintu B)
Teratai (N22)	Taman Putra	100/22/03	Dewan Orang Ramai Taman Putra
Teratai (N22)	Taman Seraya	100/22/04	SMK Taman Seraya
Teratai (N22)	Taman Melor	100/22/05	SMK Taman Seraya
Teratai (N22)	Taman Mega Jaya	100/22/06	Dewan Utama Taman Mega Jaya
Teratai (N22)	Taman Mawar	100/22/07	Taski Abim Mawar Taman Mawar
Teratai (N22)	Taman Bukit Teratai	100/22/08	SK Taman Bukit Teratai
Teratai (N22)	Pandan Perdana Barat	100/22/09	SK Pandan Perdana
Teratai (N22)	Kampung Cheras Bahru Barat	100/22/10	SK Kampung Cheras Bahru (Pintu B)
Teratai (N22)	Taman Muda Barat	100/22/11	SK Taman Muda (Pintu B)
Teratai (N22)	Taman Saga	100/22/12	Dewan Orang Ramai Taman Saga
Teratai (N22)	Cheras Hartamas	100/22/13	Dewan MPAJ Cheras Hartamas
Teratai (N22)	Tasik Permai	100/22/14	SK Tasek Permai
Teratai (N22)	Pandan Indah Jalan 5	100/22/15	SK Pandan Indah
Teratai (N22)	Pandan Mewah	100/22/16	SMK Pandan Mewah

=== Representation history ===
Members of Parliament for Pandan
Parliament	No	Years	Member	Party	Vote Share
Constituency created from Ampang Jaya
11th	P100	2004–2008	Ong Tee Keat (翁诗杰)	BN (MCA)	26,721; 67.94%
12th	P100	2008–2013	Ong Tee Keat (翁诗杰)	BN (MCA)	25,236; 53.12%
13th	P100	2013–2015	Mohd Rafizi Ramli (رافيزي رملي)	PR (PKR)	48,183; 66.87%
13th	P100	2015–2018	Mohd Rafizi Ramli (رافيزي رملي)	PH (PKR)	48,183; 66.87%
14th	P100	2018–2022	Wan Azizah Wan Ismail (وان عزيزة وان إسماعيل)	PH (PKR)	64,733; 75.47%
15th	P100	2022–2026	Mohd Rafizi Ramli (رافيزي رملي)	PH (PKR)	74,002; 63.98%
15th	P100	2026–present	Vacant		

=== State constituency ===
Parliamentary constituency	State constituency						
Parliamentary constituency	1955–59*	1959–1974	1974–1986	1986–1995	1995–2004	2004–2018	2018–present
Pandan						Chempaka	
Pandan							Pandan Indah
Pandan						Teratai	

=== Historical boundaries ===
State constituency	Area	
State constituency	2003	2018
Chempaka	Kampung Baru Ampang Tambahan; Pandan Indah; Pandan Jaya; Pandan Mewah; Taman Muda	
Pandan Indah		Ampang Hilir; Pandan Indah; Pandan Jaya; Pandan Utama; Taman Kencana
Teratai	Cheras Hartamas; Pandan Perdana; Taman Bukit Teratai; Taman Mawar; Taman Seraya	Ampang Permai; Cheras Hartamas; Pandan Mewah; Taman Bukit Teratai; Taman Muda

=== Current state assembly members ===
No.	State constituency	Member	Coalition (party)
N21	Pandan Indah	Izham Hashim	PH (AMANAH)
N22	Teratai	Yew Jia Haur	PH (DAP)

=== Local governments & postcodes ===
No.	State constituency	Local government	Postcodes
N21	Pandan Indah	Ampang Jaya Municipal Council	68000 Ampang; 55100, 55300, 56100 Kuala Lumpur
N22	Teratai	Ampang Jaya Municipal Council	68000 Ampang; 55100, 55300, 56100 Kuala Lumpur

== Election results ==
Malaysian general election, 2022
Party	Candidate	Votes	%	∆%
PH	Mohd Rafizi Ramli	74,002	63.98	▲63.98
PN	Muhammad Farique Zubir Albakri	25,706	22.23	▲22.23
BN	Leong Kok Wee	11,664	10.09	▼4.12
Heritage	Ong Tee Keat	3,323	2.87	▲2.87
PEJUANG	Nadia Hanafiah	961	0.83	▲0.83
Total valid votes		115,656	100.00	
Total rejected ballots		606		
Unreturned ballots		214		
Turnout		116,476	77.76	▼7.58
Registered electors		148,730		
Majority		48,296	41.75	▼19.51
PH hold		Swing		
Source(s) https://lom.agc.gov.my/ilims/upload/portal/akta/outputp/1753283/PUB612.pdf

Malaysian general election, 2018
Party	Candidate	Votes	%	∆%
PKR	Wan Azizah Wan Ismail	64,733	75.47	▲8.60
BN	Leong Kok Wee	12,190	14.21	▼15.57
PAS	Mohamed Sukri Omar	8,336	9.72	▲9.72
Parti Rakyat Malaysia	Lee Ying Ha	442	0.52	▲0.52
Independent	Mohd Khairul Azam Abdul Aziz	73	0.09	▲0.09
Total valid votes		85,774	100.00	
Total rejected ballots		517		
Unreturned ballots		223		
Turnout		86,514	85.34	▼1.98
Registered electors		101,319		
Majority		52,543	61.26	▲24.17
PKR hold		Swing		
Source(s) "His Majesty's Government Gazette - Notice of Contested Election, Parliament for the State of Selangor [P.U. (B) 239/2018]" (PDF). Attorney General's Chambers of Malaysia. 3 May 2018. Archived from the original (PDF) on 19 July 2019. "Federal Government Gazette - Results of Contested Election and Statements of the Poll after the Official Addition of Votes, Parliamentary Constituencies for the State of Selangor [P.U. (B) 313/2018]" (PDF). Attorney General's Chambers of Malaysia. 28 May 2018. Archived from the original (PDF) on 19 July 2019.

Malaysian general election, 2013
Party	Candidate	Votes	%	∆%
PKR	Mohd Rafizi Ramli	48,183	66.87	▲19.99
BN	Lim Chin Yee	21,454	29.78	▼23.34
Independent	Tan Yew Leng	2,415	3.35	▲3.38
Total valid votes		72,052	100.00	
Total rejected ballots		1,023		
Unreturned ballots		153		
Turnout		73,228	87.32	▲12.42
Registered electors		83,857		
Majority		26,729	37.09	▲36.85
PKR gain from BN		Swing		?
Source(s) "Federal Government Gazette - Notice of Contested Election, Parliament for the State of Selangor [P.U. (B) 176/2013]" (PDF). Attorney General's Chambers of Malaysia. 26 April 2013. Archived from the original (PDF) on 2018-09-30. "Federal Government Gazette - Results of Contested Election and Statements of the Poll after the Official Addition of Votes, Parliamentary Constituencies for the State of Selangor [P.U. (B) 217/2013]" (PDF). Attorney General's Chambers of Malaysia. 22 May 2013. Archived from the original (PDF) on 30 September 2018.

Malaysian general election, 2008
Party	Candidate	Votes	%	∆%
BN	Ong Tee Keat	25,236	53.12	▼14.82
PKR	Syed Syahir Syed Mohamud	22,275	46.88	▲46.88
Total valid votes		47,511	100.00	
Total rejected ballots		798		
Unreturned ballots		0		
Turnout		48,309	74.90	▲5.75
Registered electors		64,497		
Majority		2,961	6.24	▼29.64
BN hold		Swing		

Malaysian general election, 2004
Party	Candidate	Votes	%
BN	Ong Tee Keat	26,721	67.94
PAS	Iskandar Abdul Samad	12,609	32.06
Total valid votes		39,330	100.00
Total rejected ballots		632	
Unreturned ballots		62	
Turnout		40,024	69.15
Registered electors		58,140	
Majority		14,112	35.88
This was a new constituency created out of Ampang Jaya which went to BN in the previous election.
