= Harun Idris =

Malaysian politician (1925–2003)

Yang Berbahagia Dato' Seri Haji Harun Idris SPMS SMS PPM
- هارون إدريس

5th Youth Chief of the United Malays National Organisation
- In office 1971–1976
- President: Tunku Abdul Rahman; Abdul Razak Hussein
- Preceded by: Senu Abdul Rahman
- Succeeded by: Syed Jaafar Albar

8th Menteri Besar of Selangor
- In office 19 March 1964 – 24 March 1976
- Preceded by: Abu Bakar Baginda
- Succeeded by: Hormat Rafei

Member of the Selangor State Legislative Assembly for Morib
- In office 25 April 1964 – 6 May 1978
- Preceded by: Mohamed Tahir Abdul Majid (BN–UMNO)
- Succeeded by: Ishak Pangat @ Shafaat

Personal details
- Born: Harun bin Idris; 22 December 1925 Petaling, Kuala Lumpur, Selangor, Federated Malay States, British Malaya (now Malaysia)
- Died: 19 October 2003 (aged 77) Kuala Lumpur, Federal Territory, Malaysia
- Resting place: Jalan Ampang Muslim Cemetery, Kuala Lumpur
- Party: United Malays National Organisation (UMNO) (1964–1987; 2000–2003); Semangat 46 (S46) (1988–1991)
- Other political affiliations: Barisan Nasional (BN) (1964–1987; 2000–2003); Gagasan Rakyat (GR) (1990-1996); Angkatan Perpaduan Ummah (APU) (1990–1991)
- Spouse: Salmah Sulaiman
- Profession: Lawyer

Harun bin Idris (Jawi: هارون إدريس, Malay pronunciation: [harun]; 22 December 1925 – 19 October 2003) was a Malaysian politician and the 8th Menteri Besar of Selangor. Apart from his career in politics, Harun Idris (as he is informally known) was heavily involved in sports particularly organising the Muhammad Ali vs Joe Bugner fight in Kuala Lumpur as well as overseeing Malaysia and Selangor football teams' most successful periods. Harun was the president of the Football Association of Selangor from 1961 to 1983 and was the manager of the Malaysian national team in the 1972 Olympics. Harun is widely acknowledged to be responsible for unearthing some of Malaysia’s best talents such as Santokh Singh, Soh Chin Ann and even the late Mokhtar Dahari.

== Early life ==
Harun was born in Petaling, Selangor (which was still a mukim under the Kuala Lumpur district) on 21 July 1925. His early schooling was in both Malay and English mediums (he attended Victoria Institution in 1936) and in the 1940s he joined the Malayan Peoples’ Anti-Japanese Army against the Japanese occupation of Malaya.

He was one of the founders of the Selangor Malays Union, and joined UMNO in 1949.

Subsequently, he joined the Malay Administrative Service and worked as an assistant district officer in the districts of Gemas and Tampin, both located in Negeri Sembilan. The year 1951 saw him serve under Malaysia’s first PM Tunku Abdul Rahman as a magistrate in Kuala Lumpur. Two years later his good work earned him a scholarship to read law in Middle Temple, England. Returning two years later, Dato Harun held the position of the President of the Sessions Court in Taiping. When Malaya gained her independence in 1957, Dato Harun was made a Deputy Public Prosecutor and was later the Acting Registrar of Societies and the Official Assignee of the Federation of Malaya. A year later, he was appointed the State Legal Adviser for Selangor. The call from a career in politics was too strong to resist and in 1964 Dato Harun resigned from said position and was appointed as Menteri Besar of Selangor after being elected the state assemblyman for the constituency of Morib.

== Political career ==
In March 1964, having won the State Assembly seat for Morib, Selangor, Dato' Seri Harun was elected to the UMNO Supreme Council and served as Selangor Umno liaison chief from 1964 to 1976. From 1964 to 1976, Dato' Seri Harun was appointed the eighth Chief Minister of Selangor, after Dato' Abu Bakar Baginda and he was the longest serving Chief Minister of Selangor, holding office for exactly 12 years, until his resignation in April 1976.

From the early 1970s until 1976, Harun was the Head of UMNO Youth and Supreme Council member. He was then expelled from UMNO and charged with corruption by the government, due to his abuse of state funds. The chief investigating officer on the corruption case (16 counts of corruption) was Ang Chooi Tuan KMN, AMN, the highest ranking Anti-Corruption Agency non-Malay/non-UMNO officer.

Harun's career was marred by the 13 May racial riots, which had been triggered by a political rally held at his residence in the national capital of Kuala Lumpur. Harun, who was perceived as a proponent of ketuanan Melayu (Malay supremacy, although this exact phrase was not in use at the time), had seen UMNO suffer several losses in the Selangor State Assembly during the 1969 general election. As a result, the opposition held a celebration rally in the state, a counter rally was then held with Malays gathering at Idris' house in Kampong Baru, which quickly spiralled out of control. The discipline of those at the rally soon broke down, and the rally turned into a riot which lasted two days and cost at least 180 lives.

Harun's role in the riot is not exactly clear and reports are conflicting. On one hand it is claimed that he was responsible for ordering the counter-rally, and even as far as supplying the Malays who gathered at his house with knives and machetes. Another report states that after meeting in large numbers at Harun's official residence in Jalan Raja Muda near Kampong Bahru, and hearing inflammatory speeches by Harun and other leaders, the Malay mobs prepared themselves by tying ribbon strips on their foreheads and set out to kill Chinese. The first victims of the riots were two Chinese that were in a van opposite Idris' house watching the large gathering.

On the other, some claim that Dato' Harun had worked to de-escalate the situation, even saving a number of Chinese people that were being targeted by Malay rioters. One of them was the late Tan Chee Khoon, the then-Leader of the Opposition. In an article written on 24 June 1981 titled 'Datuk Harun and the May 13 Tragedy', Chee Khoon exonerates Harun by arguing that

1. Dato Harun was too busy organising the formation of the Selangor State Government and as a result could not have organised the counter-rally
2. According to intelligence sources, various armed groups had infiltrated Kuala Lumpur with malicious intent
3. Dato Harun had driven a number of Chinese people in this car to the Campbell Road Police Station

Chee Khoon concludes the article by writing "I have related this story not with the idea of reviving an old controversy but to show that Datuk Harun was not out for the blood of Chinese in those days of tragedy as claimed in some quarters".

He served as Kuala Langat Umno Division Chief for 3 years until 1984. Dato' Seri Harun also served as a council member of the Selangor Royal Council from 1994 until his demise. On 15 November 1986 he was called to the Malaysian Bar and thereafter returned to his old profession of law practice and became a senior partner of Harun Idris, Yeoh & Partners and was actively practising law until his demise.

Harun served as Semangat 46 Supreme Council member and Selangor Chief for a brief period from 1987 to 1990. In the year 2000, Dato' Seri Harun rejoined Umno and was a member of the Umno SS7 Sri Dagang Branch, in the Subang Division.

Dato' Seri Harun died after a short illness on 19 October 2003 at the age of 77 and is survived by his wife Datin Seri Salmah Sulaiman, three sons, three daughters, 18 grandchildren and 22 great-grandchildren.

== Election results ==
Selangor State Legislative Assembly
Year	Constituency	Candidate	Votes	Pct	Opponent(s)	Votes	Pct	Ballots cast	Majority	Turnout
1964	N22 Morib	Harun Idris (UMNO)	4,760	62.77%	Abdul Aziz Ishak (SF)	2,823	37.23%	8,205	1,937	80.61%
1969	N22 Morib	Harun Idris (UMNO)	5,038	63.29%	Mohd. Shahid Arshad (PAS)	2,922	36.71%	9,081	2,116	72.94%
1974	N30 Morib	Harun Idris (UMNO)	4,045	79.63%	Idris Idrus (DAP)	1,035	20.37%	5,307	5,307	78.60%
1990	N38 Morib	Harun Idris (S46)	3,325	31.47%	Abu Bakar Abdul Hamid (UMNO)	7,240	68.53%	11,092	3,915	76.45%

Parliament of Malaysia
Year	Constituency	Candidate	Votes	Pct	Opponent(s)	Votes	Pct	Ballots cast	Majority	Turnout
1989	P088 Ampang Jaya	Harun Idris (S46)	19,469	44.80%	Ong Tee Keat (MCA)	23,719	54.59%	43,848	4,250	63.97%
1989	P088 Ampang Jaya	Harun Idris (S46)	19,469	44.80%	Wang Ah Hoong (IND)	109	0.25%	43,848	4,250	63.97%
1989	P088 Ampang Jaya	Harun Idris (S46)	19,469	44.80%	Syed Idrus Syed Ahmad (IND)	49	0.11%	43,848	4,250	63.97%
1989	P088 Ampang Jaya	Harun Idris (S46)	19,469	44.80%	Loh Ah Ha (IND)	43	0.10%	43,848	4,250	63.97%
1989	P088 Ampang Jaya	Harun Idris (S46)	19,469	44.80%	Adam Daim (IND)	42	0.10%	43,848	4,250	63.97%
1989	P088 Ampang Jaya	Harun Idris (S46)	19,469	44.80%	Che Bakar Said (IND)	22	0.05%	43,848	4,250	63.97%
1990	P098 Titiwangsa	Harun Idris (S46)	15,108	35.73%	Suleiman Mohamed (UMNO)	27,179	64.27%	43,829	12,071	67.45%

== Honours ==
- Malaysia
  - Recipient of the Malaysian Commemorative Medal (Gold) (PPM) (1965)
- Selangor
  - Knight Grand Commander of the Order of the Crown of Selangor (SPMS) – Dato' Seri (1971)
  - Companion of the Order of the Crown of Selangor (SMS) (1963)

== Bibliography ==
- Bruce Gale, Politics and public enterprise in Malaysia, Eastern Universities Press, 1981, ISBN 9971711524

Political offices
Preceded by Abu Bakar Baginda	Chief Minister of Selangor; 1964–1976	Succeeded by Hormat Rafei
