= Ong Tee Keat =

Malaysian politician

Yang Berbahagia Tan Sri Dato' Sri Ong Tee Keat PSM SSAP PJN SMS
- 翁诗杰
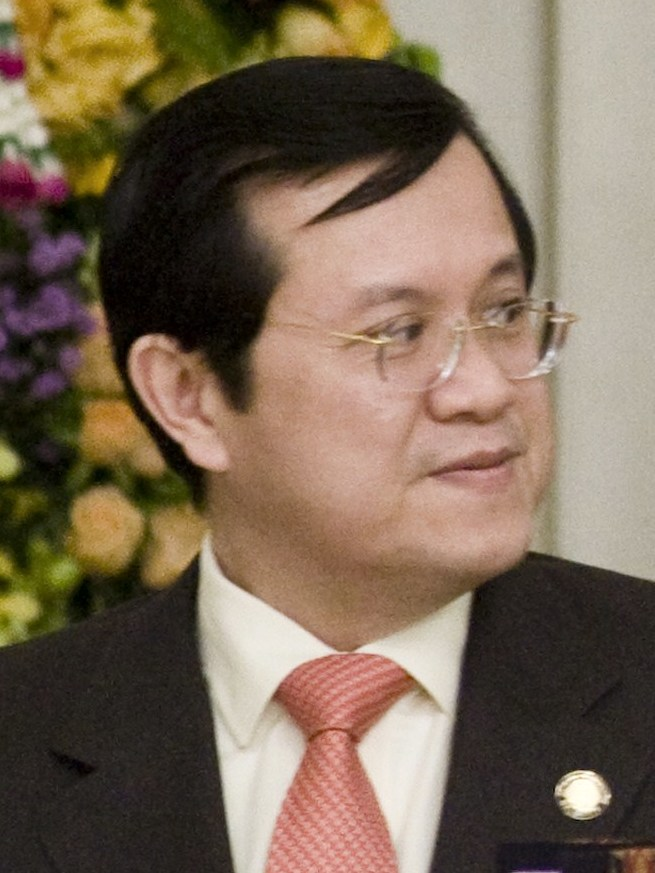
- Ong in 2009

Minister of Transport
- In office 19 March 2008 – 4 June 2010
- Monarch: Mizan Zainal Abidin
- Prime Minister: Abdullah Badawi; Najib Razak
- Deputy: Lajim Ukin (2008–2009); Abdul Rahim Bakri (2009–2010); Robert Lau Hoi Chew (2009–2010)
- Preceded by: Chan Kong Choy
- Succeeded by: Kong Cho Ha
- Constituency: Pandan

Deputy Minister of Higher Education
- In office 14 February 2006 – 18 March 2008
- Monarchs: Sirajuddin; Mizan Zainal Abidin
- Prime Minister: Abdullah Ahmad Badawi
- Minister: Mustapa Mohamed
- Preceded by: Fu Ah Kiow
- Succeeded by: Idris Haron; Hou Kok Chung
- Constituency: Pandan

Deputy Minister of Youth and Sports
- In office 15 December 1999 – 14 February 2006
- Monarchs: Salahuddin; Sirajuddin
- Prime Minister: Mahathir Mohamad; Abdullah Badawi
- Minister: Hishammuddin Hussein (1999–2004); Azalina Othman Said (2004–2006)
- Preceded by: Loke Yuen Yow
- Succeeded by: Liow Tiong Lai
- Constituency: Ampang Jaya; Pandan

Deputy Speaker of the Dewan Rakyat I
- In office 11 June 1990 – 10 November 1999 Serving with Mohamed Amin Daud; Juhar Mahiruddin
- Monarchs: Azlan Shah; Ja'afar; Salahuddin
- Prime Minister: Mahathir Mohamad
- Speaker: Mohamed Zahir Ismail
- Constituency: Ampang Jaya

8th President of the Malaysian Chinese Association
- In office 18 October 2008 – 28 March 2010
- Deputy: Chua Soi Lek
- Preceded by: Ong Ka Ting
- Succeeded by: Chua Soi Lek
- Constituency: Pandan

Member of the Malaysian Parliament for Pandan
- In office 21 March 2004 – 5 May 2013
- Preceded by: Position established
- Succeeded by: Rafizi Ramli (PKR)
- Majority: 14,112 (2004); 2,961 (2008)

Member of the Malaysian Parliament for Ampang Jaya
- In office 28 January 1989 – 21 March 2004
- Preceded by: Lim Ann Koon (BN–MCA)
- Succeeded by: Position abolished
- Majority: 4,250 (1989); 13,350 (1990); 31,061 (1995); 7,767 (1999)

Personal details
- Born: 22 November 1956 (age 69) Petaling Street, Kuala Lumpur, Selangor, Federation of Malaya (now Malaysia)
- Party: Malaysian Chinese Association (MCA) (1989–2017); Heritage Party (WARISAN) (since 2022)
- Other political affiliations: Barisan Nasional (BN) (1989–2017)
- Spouse: Chooi Yoke Chun (徐玉珍)
- Children: 3
- Occupation: Politician
- Profession: Engineer

Ong Tee Keat (simplified Chinese: 翁诗杰; traditional Chinese: 翁詩傑; pinyin: Wēng Shījié; Pe̍h-ōe-jī: Ong Si-kia̍t; born 22 November 1956) is a Malaysian politician who served as the Minister of Transport in the Barisan Nasional (BN) administration under former Prime Ministers Abdullah Ahmad Badawi and Najib Razak from March 2008 to June 2010, Deputy Minister of Higher Education in the BN administration under former Prime Minister Abdullah Ahmad and former Minister Mustapa Mohamed from February 2006 to March 2008, Deputy Minister of Youth and Sports in the BN administration under former Prime Ministers Mahathir Mohamad and Abdullah Ahmad as well as former Ministers Hishammuddin Hussein and Azalina Othman Said from December 1999 to February 2006, Deputy Speaker of the Dewan Rakyat under former Speaker Mohamed Zahir Ismail from June 1990 to November 1999 and Member of Parliament (MP) for Pandan from March 2004 to May 2013 and for Ampang Jaya from January 1989 to March 2004. He is a member of the opposition Heritage Party (WARISAN) and was a member of the Malaysian Chinese Association (MCA), a component party of the ruling BN coalition. He also served as the 8th President of MCA from October 2008 to March 2010.

== Personal life ==
The son of a fishmonger, Ong was an active grassroots MCA member even while at varsity. Educated at Confucian High School in Kuala Lumpur, Ong went on to the prestigious Methodist Boys' School for Form Six studies. Six years after graduating as a mechanical engineer, and while enjoying a lucrative post at an engineering firm, he quit to become political secretary to the then Housing and Local Government Minister Tan Sri Dato' Sri Lee Kim Sai in 1986.

Ong is married to Puan Sri Datin Sri Chooi Yoke Chun and has three daughters. Despite being Chinese educated, Ong is fully trilingual in Mandarin, English and Malay.

Ong won several literary awards for his works was once a columnist for Chinese daily Sin Chew Jit Poh. His articles ran from 1979 to 1986.

== Political career ==
After becoming a full-time politician 1989, he contested the Ampang Jaya parliamentary seat in the 28 January 1989 by-election, upon the resignation of incumbent, Lim Ann Koon. He faced a tough challenge in his maiden effort to be a member of parliament when he was pitted against former Selangor Menteri Besar Datuk Harun Idris who was standing on a Parti Melayu Semangat 46 (S46) ticket. Ong beat the former Umno strongman by 4,500 votes. He went on to hold the seat for four terms before contesting and winning the newly created Pandan parliamentary seat in the 2004 general election. He successfully defended the seat in the 2008 general election.

When Ong was MCA Youth chief, he criticised the party top brass for the decision in 2002 to acquire Nanyang Press Holdings Bhd. A few years later, he was censured by the Cabinet for speaking out at the shoddy renovation work at a Chinese school in Muar, Johor.

Ong was appointed to the federal Cabinet after the 2008 election, as the Minister for Transport. He had previously been Deputy Youth and Sports Minister and Deputy Higher Education Minister.

=== MCA presidency ===
In October 2008, Ong was elected MCA president, while Datuk Seri Dr Chua Soi Lek was elected deputy president. This set forth a tumultuous partnership, and eventually Dr Chua was expelled from the party by the Disciplinary Committee for his involvement in a sex scandal.

An extraordinary general meeting of the MCA was held on 10 October 2009 in which a vote of no confidence was passed against Ong and his deputy, Chua Soi Lek. Ong Tee Keat refuses to resign. Instead, he and Chua have agreed to bury the hatchet to unite and strengthen the party without any conditions under a "greater unity" plan. He said Liow Tiong Lai still was the legitimate deputy president of MCA as it is elected by the Central Committee. Liow was later removed from the deputy president's post by the Registrar of Societies (RoS) which declared that the post was never vacant to begin with.

Some Central Committees who were previously supporting Ong, led by Liow Tiong Lai, turned against Ong and attempted to demand for a re-election for the Central Committee. They were supported by MCA Youth Chief, Wee Ka Siong, and also the MCA Women Chief, Chew Mei Fun. Finally, these Central Committees, and also a few other CCs led by Chua Soi Lek, together resigned and forced a re-election, as they have achieved at least 2/3 majority of the CC, as per the party constitution.

=== Loss of MCA presidency and Cabinet post ===
Ong Tee Keat contested in the re-election in early March 2010 to defend his presidency, against his former Deputy, Chua Soi Lek, and also his predecessor, Ong Ka Ting, who came back in popular demand. He did not appoint any partner to contest for the Deputy Presidency, unlike Chua who appointed Kong Cho Ha and Ong Ka Ting who appointed Liow Tiong Lai.

Ong Tee Keat and Ong Ka Ting were both defeated by Chua Soi Lek. Later in 2010, and as a consequence, Ong Tee Keat was dropped from the federal Cabinet.

=== Exit from Parliament ===
The Barisan Nasional coalition left Ong out of its list of candidates for the 2013 election. He considered recontesting his Pandan seat as an independent, but ultimately decided against it. Barisan Nasional lost the seat to the Rafizi Ramli of the People's Justice Party (PKR).

=== Resignation from MCA ===
On 2 March 2017, it was revealed that Ong had resigned from MCA with effect from 2 January 2017, citing the reason that he wanted to remain as an ordinary citizen.

=== Joining Warisan ===
On 28 October 2022, Ong had revealed to the news media that he has make a political comeback by campaigning for the parliamentary seat of Pandan. He stated that a lot had changed in the Pandan constituency since he left, with constituents telling him there were no festivals to foster unity like he used to host when he was MP. “Warisan gives me a platform to champion integrity and a corrupt free Malaysia – issues which I have always been passionate about.” he said. He lost the election to Rafizi Ramli from the Pakatan Harapan (PH) and People's Justice Party (PKR) by a minority of 70,679 votes, garnering only 3,323 votes, which is 2.87% of the total votes and losing the deposit of RM 10,000. For the deposit to be refunded, he has to garner at least 14,457 votes, which is 12.5% of the total votes.

== Election results ==
Parliament of Malaysia
Year	Constituency	Candidate	Votes	Pct	Opponent(s)	Votes	Pct	Ballots cast	Majority	Turnout
1989	P088 Ampang Jaya	Ong Tee Keat (MCA)	23,719	54.59%	Harun Idris (S46)	19,469	44.80%	43,848	4,250	63.97%
1989	P088 Ampang Jaya	Ong Tee Keat (MCA)	23,719	54.59%	Wang Ah Hoong (IND)	109	0.25%	43,848	4,250	63.97%
1989	P088 Ampang Jaya	Ong Tee Keat (MCA)	23,719	54.59%	Syed Idrus Syed Ahmad (IND)	49	0.11%	43,848	4,250	63.97%
1989	P088 Ampang Jaya	Ong Tee Keat (MCA)	23,719	54.59%	Loh Ah Ha (IND)	43	0.10%	43,848	4,250	63.97%
1989	P088 Ampang Jaya	Ong Tee Keat (MCA)	23,719	54.59%	Adam Daim (IND)	42	0.10%	43,848	4,250	63.97%
1989	P088 Ampang Jaya	Ong Tee Keat (MCA)	23,719	54.59%	Che Bakar Said (IND)	22	0.05%	43,848	4,250	63.97%
1990	P088 Ampang Jaya	Ong Tee Keat (MCA)	39,304	60.23%	Zainal Rampak (S46)	25,954	39.77%	66,767	13,350	74.92%
1995	P092 Ampang Jaya	Ong Tee Keat (MCA)	45,282	76.10%	Wan Mohd Fuaad Wan Abdullah (S46)	14,221	23.90%	61,608	31,061	71.68%
1999	P092 Ampang Jaya	Ong Tee Keat (MCA)	40,669	55.28%	Sivarasa Rasiah (keADILan)	32,902	44.72%	74,869	7,767	75.98%
2004	P100 Pandan	Ong Tee Keat (MCA)	26,721	66.76%	Iskandar Abdul Samad (PAS)	12,609	31.50%	40,024	14,112	69.15%
2008	P100 Pandan	Ong Tee Keat (MCA)	25,236	53.12%	Syed Syahir Syed Mohamud (PKR)	22,275	46.88%	48,309	2,961	74.90%
2022	P100 Pandan	Ong Tee Keat (WARISAN)	3,323	2.87%	Rafizi Ramli (PKR)	74,002	63.98%	115,656	48,296	77.76%
2022	P100 Pandan	Ong Tee Keat (WARISAN)	3,323	2.87%	Muhammad Rafique Zubir Albakri (PAS)	25,706	22.23%	115,656	48,296	77.76%
2022	P100 Pandan	Ong Tee Keat (WARISAN)	3,323	2.87%	Leong Kok Wee (MCA)	11,664	10.09%	115,656	48,296	77.76%
2022	P100 Pandan	Ong Tee Keat (WARISAN)	3,323	2.87%	Nadia Hanafiah (PEJUANG)	961	0.83%	115,656	48,296	77.76%

== Honours ==
=== Honours of Malaysia ===
- Malaysia
  - Commander of the Order of Loyalty to the Crown of Malaysia (PSM) – Tan Sri (2014)
  - Commander of the Order of Meritorious Service (PJN) – Datuk (1998)
- Pahang
  - Knight Grand Companion of the Order of Sultan Ahmad Shah of Pahang (SSAP) – Dato' Sri (2008)
- Selangor
  - Companion of the Order of the Crown of Selangor (SMS) (1991)

Political offices
Preceded by Ong Ka Ting	Malaysian Chinese Association (MCA) President; 18 October 2008 – 28 March 2010	Succeeded by Chua Soi Lek
