= Lee Ying Ha =

Malaysian politician

Jenice Lee Ying Ha
- 李映霞

Member of the Selangor State Assembly for Teratai
- In office 8 March 2008 – 5 May 2013
- Preceded by: Yap Soo Sun (BN–MCA)
- Succeeded by: Tiew Way Keng (PR–DAP)
- Majority: 8,085 (2008)

Personal details
- Born: Jenice Lee Ying Ha; 28 April 1980 (age 46) Ampang, Selangor, Malaysia
- Party: Democratic Action Party (DAP) (1999–2013); Independent (2013–2018); Parti Rakyat Malaysia (PRM) (2018–present)
- Other political affiliations: Pakatan Rakyat (PR) (2008–2013); Barisan Alternatif (BA) (1999–2004)
- Education: Sydney University, Curtin University
- Occupation: Politician
- Website: Jenice Lee 李映霞 Blog

Lee Ying Ha

Chinese name
- Traditional Chinese: 李映霞
- Simplified Chinese: 李映霞
- Hanyu Pinyin: Lǐ Yìngxiá
- Jyutping: Lei5 Jing2 Haa4

Jenice Lee Ying Ha (Chinese: 李映霞; pinyin: Lǐ Yìngxiá; Jyutping: Lei5 Jing2 Haa4) is a Malaysian politician from the Parti Rakyat Malaysia (PRM). Lee was also a one term Member of the Selangor State Legislative Assembly for the Teratai constituency from 2008 to 2013 representing Democratic Action Party (DAP) of Pakatan Rakyat (PR) coalition then.

== Background ==
Lee is an atheist Malaysian Chinese of Cantonese descent from Selangor. She graduated from Sydney University, major in Economics, Politics & International Relations. She started as a student's leader and she was the founding Vice Presidents of New Era College Students' Union. From a student activist she eventually joined NGOs such as Suara Rakyat Malaysia (SUARAM), the Human Rights NGO and eventually she joined political party; DAP.

Lee started her political involvement since 1999. During these period of times she actively participated in regional and international event such as IUSY conference and later she became a founding member of YPSEA. She was invited & sponsored by US Embassy for The International Leadership program; study visit on United Nations and also political study tour at Berlin that invited cum sponsored by FES; became a member of International Observer for Cambodia Election that sponsored by ANFREL at the age of 20.

Lee had received the "Outstanding Alumni Award" from INTI College.

== Political career ==
Lee made her debut by contesting and winning the Selangor State Legislative Assembly seat of Teratai as a DAP candidate in the 2008 general election.

Lee defended her seat as an independent by using "Tree" as her logo in the 2013 general election after her name was dropped by the DAP's 4 men select committee. Later DAP disciplinary chairman Tan Kok Wai announced she practised corruption and abuse of power. However, those allegations were not proven until today. Lee also faced many disagreements and needed to fend off political attacks from her former party DAP and other sects from the Pakatan Rakyat.

Lee finally announced she had joined Parti Rakyat Malaysia (PRM) in January 2018 and she was appointed as PRM Deputy President. In the subsequent 2018 general election in May, she contested Pandan parliamentary seat and Teratai state seat under PRM tickets but lost both.

== Election results ==
Selangor State Legislative Assembly
Year	Constituency	Candidate	Votes	Pct	Opponent(s)	Votes	Pct	Ballots cast	Majority	Turnout
2008	N22 Teratai	Lee Ying Ha (DAP)	15,563	67.54%	Lum Weng Keong (MCA)	7,478	32.46%	23,733	8,085	76.63%
2013	N22 Teratai	Lee Ying Ha (IND)	1,832	5.16%	Tiew Way Keng (DAP)	23,578	66.38%	36,086	13,646	88.31%
2013	N22 Teratai	Lee Ying Ha (IND)	1,832	5.16%	Liew Pok Boon (Gerakan)	9,932	27.97%	36,086	13,646	88.31%
2013	N22 Teratai	Lee Ying Ha (IND)	1,832	5.16%	Chin Kok Keong (IND)	115	0.32%	36,086	13,646	88.31%
2013	N22 Teratai	Lee Ying Ha (IND)	1,832	5.16%	Lim Ah Chai (IND)	61	0.17%	36,086	13,646	88.31%
2018	N22 Teratai	Lee Ying Ha (PRM)	529	1.18%	Lai Wai Chong (DAP)	34,453	76.91%	45,171	29,425	86.44%
2018	N22 Teratai	Lee Ying Ha (PRM)	529	1.18%	Liew Pok Boon (Gerakan)	4,784	10.68%	45,171	29,425	86.44%
2018	N22 Teratai	Lee Ying Ha (PRM)	529	1.18%	Mohd Irman Abd Wahab (PAS)	5,028	11.22%	45,171	29,425	86.44%

Parliament of Malaysia
Year	Constituency	Candidate	Votes	Pct	Opponent(s)	Votes	Pct	Ballots cast	Majority	Turnout
2018	P100 Pandan	Lee Ying Ha (PRM)	442	0.52%	Wan Azizah Wan Ismail (PKR)	64,733	75.47%	85,774	52,543	84.66%
2018	P100 Pandan	Lee Ying Ha (PRM)	442	0.52%	Leong Kok Wee (MCA)	12,190	14.21%	85,774	52,543	84.66%
2018	P100 Pandan	Lee Ying Ha (PRM)	442	0.52%	Mohamed Sukri Omar (PAS)	8,335	9.72%	85,774	52,543	84.66%
2018	P100 Pandan	Lee Ying Ha (PRM)	442	0.52%	Wan Muhd Azri Wan Deris (IND)	73	0.09%	85,774	52,543	84.66%

== See also ==
- Teratai (state constituency)
- Pandan (federal constituency)
