= Iskandar Abdul Samad =

Malaysian politician

Yang Berbahagia Dato' Ir. Iskandar Abdul Samad DPMS
- إسکندر عبدالصمد
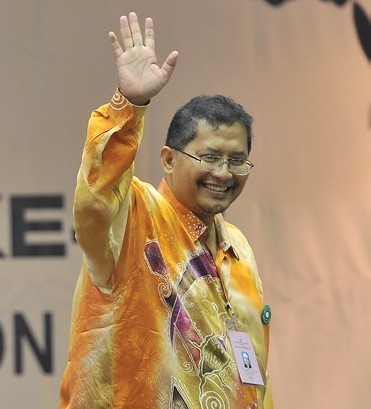

Member of the Selangor State Executive Council
- In office 2014 – 2018 (Housing, Urban Management and Urban Living)
- Monarch: Sharafuddin
- Menteri Besar: Mohamed Azmin Ali
- In office 2013 – 2014 (Housing, Building Management and Building Settlers)
- Monarch: Sharafuddin
- Menteri Besar: Abdul Khalid Ibrahim
- In office 2008 – 2013 (Housing, Building Management and Squatters)
- Monarch: Sharafuddin
- Menteri Besar: Abdul Khalid Ibrahim

Faction represented in Selangor State Legislative Assembly
- 2008–2018: Malaysian Islamic Party

Personal details
- Born: 28 February 1961 (age 65) Selangor, Federation of Malaya (now Malaysia)
- Citizenship: Malaysian
- Party: Malaysian Islamic Party (PAS)
- Other political affiliations: Perikatan Nasional (PN); Muafakat Nasional (MN); Gagasan Sejahtera (GS); Pakatan Rakyat (PR); Barisan Alternatif (BA)
- Spouse: Datin Salasiah Zakaria
- Occupation: Politician

Iskandar bin Abdul Samad is a Malaysian politician who served as Selangor State Executive Councillor. He had also served as one of the Board of Directors of the Selangor State Development Corporation (PKNS).

He is the National Treasurer of the Malaysian Islamic Party (PAS). He is a graduate of the Malay College Kuala Kangsar (MCKK). He has a British degree in architecture.

== Political career ==
In the 2015 Pan-Malaysian Islamic Party leadership election he was chosen as one of the three Vice Presidents after securing 672 votes from the delegates. At the 2017 party election, the incumbents were challenged by Temerloh Member of Parliament, Ustaz Nasrudin Hassan but he was not successful. Iskandar managed to retain his vice president post by securing 703 votes.

In May 2016, Iskandar as the Vice President of PAS said that the party's decision to contest the 2016 Sungai Besar by-election is final and should not be questioned by anyone. He also said that it is a traditional PAS seat.

In a related event, Selangor Chief Minister (Menteri Besar) Mohamed Azmin Ali denied allegation that he had asked the State Executive Councillors from PAS to resign from government if PAS intend to contest the by-election. Finally the Sungai Besar Parliamentary by-election was contested by Barisan Nasional (BN), PAS and Parti Amanah Negara (Amanah), a three-cornered fight. The candidates were from BN with Budiman Mohd Zohdi, PAS with Dr Abdul Rani Osman and Amanah with Azhar Abdul Shukur. The by-election was won by BN with a 9,191 votes majority. Their candidate reaped 16,800 votes leaving Dr Abdul Rani (6,902 votes) and Azhar (7,609 votes) far behind.

After winning the Vice President post for the second time he was dropped as the PAS' State Commissioner for Selangor. He is said to be in favour of working with other opposition parties and could be the reason he was axed.

However, PAS Secretary General, Takiyuddin Hassan clarified that Iskandar has been promoted and given the task of monitoring the party's machinery in the central and south zones (Selangor, Melaka, Negri Sembilan and Johor). He was replaced by Ustaz Sallehen Mukhyi from Sabak.

Iskandar declined to defend his vice president post in the 2019 Malaysian Islamic Party leadership election. Subsequently, Terengganu Menteri Besar (Chief Minister), Dr Ahmad Samsuri Mokhtar won uncontested together with incumbents Ustaz Idris Ahmad and Datuk Nik Mohd. Amar Nik Abdullah. According to Iskandar he wanted to give way to a more high profiled candidate. He however was one of the 18 Central Committee members elected, finishing fourth garnering 856 votes from the 1,230 delegates.

=== Positions ===
In September 2016, Iskandar announced that it will be compulsory for developers to build 10% to 20% affordable units for their serviced apartment, small office/home office (Soho) or small office/virtual office (Sovo) projects. These units will be controlled by the Selangor Housing And Property Board (Lembaga Perumahan Dan Hartanah Selangor / LPHS) and can only be sold to those eligible. Each unit will cost between RM230,000 to RM270,000. In March 2018, Iskandar informed that the Selangor State Government had resolved 53 abandoned housing projects involving 24,660 units from 2008 to 2017. In December 2008, there were 116 abandoned housing projects or 42,541 units.

During Iskandar's tenure as the State Executive Councillor, the Selangor State Government launched the Caring Government Residents' Improvement Aid (CERIA) scheme in 2010 to repair and rehabilitate low cost and medium cost apartments on a cost sharing basis. Initially the State Government pays 80 percent and the houseowners pay 20 percent. In July 2017, he announced that 183 low cost and medium cost housing projects had been rehabilitated since 2010 under the CERIA programme costing more than RM55 million. He also said 88 lifts from 17 projects will be rehabilitated at a cost of more than RM22 million under the SMART LIFE programme. While 90 lifts from 22 projects will be maintained by the Selangor State Government at a cost of almost RM800,000.

The Rumah Selangorku (My Selangor Home) programme is the Selangor State's affordable housing scheme started in 2014 when Iskandar was the Executive Councillor in charge of housing where developers must build homes ranging between RM42,000 and RM250,000 per unit. Under the scheme it is compulsory for developers that develop more than 10 acres of land to dedicate a certain percentage of their development for affordable housing.

In September 2016, Iskandar urged the Federal Government to follow the Rumah Selangorku policy where priority is being given to constructing affordable homes. There are several types namely RM42,000, RM100,000, RM150,000, RM180,000, RM220,000 and RM250,000. In March 2017, Iskandar reported 20,675 unit of affordable homes under the Rumah Selangorku programme from 24 projects are being constructed. While 665 units from 2 project have been completed. In total, 89,396 units have been approved and 24,700 units in 24 project have already obtained the planning approval. While 3,803 units in 13 projects have obtained the building plans approval.

In January 2017, Iskandar as the Selangor State Executive Councillor for Housing, Building Management and Urban Living announced that the State Government will spend RM100 million to buy the Rumah Selangorku Affordable Homes. The houses will be rented out under the Smart Sewa (Smart Rental) scheme to people who failed to get the financing to buy their own home or those who are not yet ready to buy a house. Under the scheme, 30% of the rent paid will be returned to them at the end of their rental contract. They can use the money to buy their own home. Iskandar reported 260 units of Affordable Homes have been identified and will be bought at a cost of RM46.5 million.

He is the founder and Head Coordinator of the Pusat Sumber Untuk Kemajuan Masyarakat Dan Perumahan or Research Centre For The Advancement Of The Community And Housing (REACH). On 18 March 2020, REACH urged the Malaysian Government to instruct the banks and other financial institutions to allow borrowers to suspend their loan repayments due to the COVID-19 pandemic. On 17 April 2020, Iskandar as the Head Coordinator of REACH said the government will be a laughing stock if they did not appoint suitable or qualified people for the government linked companies and agencies. On 5 October 2020, REACH proposed mandatory prison term and whipping for owners of industries found guilty of polluting water source resulting in disruption of water supply. REACH also proposed their assets to be seized.

=== Alleged interference in Singaporean politics ===
In 2025, Iskandar was one of three people, and of the three, two Malaysians, named by the Government of Singapore for allegedly conducting foreign interference in that year's general election via Facebook posts; the Infocomm Media Development Authority (IMDA) ordered Meta, the parent company of Facebook, to block the posts in Singapore. Besides writing a post endorsing the election of Faisal Manap, vice-chairperson of the opposition Workers' Party (WP), he had shared other posts supporting various other opposition candidates from different parties. An incumbent Member of Parliament (MP) for Aljunied Group Representation Constituency (GRC), Faisal had been transferred to Tampines GRC to lead a WP team against the governing People's Action Party (PAP).

== Election results ==
Selangor State Legislative Assembly
Year	Constituency	Candidate	Votes	Pct	Opponent(s)	Votes	Pct	Ballots cast	Majority	Turnout
1999	N21 Lembah Jaya	Iskandar Abdul Samad (PAS)	12,013	45.78%	Ismail Kijo (UMNO)	14,267	54.22%	26,770	1,048	77.66%
2008	N21 Chempaka	Iskandar Abdul Samad (PAS)	12,528	52.18%	Nosimah Hashim (UMNO)	11,480	47.82%	23,733	1,048	73.14%
2013	N21 Chempaka	Iskandar Abdul Samad (PAS)	23,117	63.12%	Muhammad Faizal Sufar (UMNO)	13,509	36.88%	37,058	9,608	86.40%
2018	N21 Pandan Indah	Iskandar Abdul Samad (PAS)	7,517	18.35%	Izham Hashim (AMANAH)	24,914	60.83%	41,331	16,386	84.20%
2018	N21 Pandan Indah	Iskandar Abdul Samad (PAS)	7,517	18.35%	Mohd Haniff Koslan (UMNO)	8,528	20.82%	41,331	16,386	84.20%

Parliament of Malaysia
Year	Constituency	Candidate	Votes	Pct	Opponent(s)	Votes	Pct	Ballots cast	Majority	Turnout
2004	P100 Pandan	Iskandar Abdul Samad (PAS)	12,609	31.50%	Ong Tee Keat (MCA)	26,721	66.76%	40,024	14,112	69.15%

== Honours ==
- Selangor
  - Knight Commander of the Order of the Crown of Selangor (DPMS) – Dato' (2014)
