= Rosnizan Ahmad =

Malaysian politician and businessman

Yang Berhormat Tuan Rosnizan Ahmad PPN MLA

Member of the Selangor State Legislative Assembly for Morib
- Incumbent
- Assumed office 12 August 2023
- Preceded by: Hasnul Baharuddin (PH–AMANAH)
- Majority: 3,843 (2023)

Personal details
- Born: Rosnizan bin Ahmad; 1972 (age 53–54) Banting Hospital, Banting, Kuala Langat, Selangor, Malaysia
- Citizenship: Malaysian
- Party: Malaysian United Indigenous Party (BERSATU)
- Other political affiliations: Perikatan Nasional (PN)
- Children: 3
- Education: Kanchong Darat National School; Telok Datok National Secondary School
- Alma mater: Lincoln University College, Malaysia (Bachelor's degree in business management)
- Occupation: Politician; businessman

Rosnizan bin Ahmad (born 1972) is a Malaysian politician and businessman who has served as Member of the Selangor State Legislative Assembly (MLA) for Morib since August 2023. He is a member of the Malaysian United Indigenous Party (BERSATU), a component party of the Perikatan Nasional (PN) coalition. He is the State Committee Member and Division Deputy Chairman of PN of Kuala Langat as well as Division Chief of BERSATU of Kuala Langat.

== Political career ==
=== Member of the Selangor State Legislative Assembly (since 2023) ===
==== 2023 Selangor state election ====
In the 2023 Selangor state election, Rosnizan made his electoral debut after being nominated by PN to contest the Morib state seat. Rosnizan won the seat and was elected to the Selangor State Legislative Assembly as the Morib MLA for the first term after defeating Hasnul Baharuddin of Pakatan Harapan (PH) by a majority of 3,843 votes.

== Election results ==
Selangor State Legislative Assembly
Year	Constituency	Candidate	Votes	Pct	Opponent(s)	Votes	Pct	Ballots cast	Majority	Turnout
2023	N53 Morib	Rosnizan Ahmad (BERSATU)	18,936	55.65%	Hasnul Baharuddin (AMANAH)	15,093	44.35%	34,029	3,843	77.64%

== Honours ==
- Malaysia
  - Medal of the Order of the Defender of the Realm (PPN) (2021)
