= Hasnul Baharuddin =

Malaysian politician

Hasnul Baharuddin PPT
- حسن البحرالدين

Deputy Speaker of the Selangor State Legislative Assembly
- In office 13 July 2020 – 23 June 2023
- Monarch: Sharafuddin
- Menteri Besar: Amirudin Shari
- Speaker: Ng Suee Lim
- Preceded by: Daroyah Alwi
- Succeeded by: Mohd Kamri Kamaruddin
- Constituency: Morib

Member of the Selangor State Legislative Assembly for Morib
- In office 5 May 2013 – 12 August 2023
- Preceded by: Hasiman Sidom (BN–UMNO)
- Succeeded by: Rosnizan Ahmad (PN–BERSATU)
- Majority: 766 (2013); 2,117 (2018)

Personal details
- Born: Hasnul bin Baharuddin; 1967 (age 58–59) Selangor, Malaysia
- Party: Malaysian Islamic Party (PAS) (–2015); National Trust Party (AMANAH) (since 2015)
- Other political affiliations: Pakatan Rakyat (PR) (–2015); Pakatan Harapan (PH) (since 2015)
- Occupation: Politician

Hasnul bin Baharuddin is a Malaysian politician who served as Deputy Speaker of the Selangor State Legislative Assembly from July 2020 to June 2023 and Member of the Assembly (MLA) for Morib from May 2013 to August 2023. He is a member of the National Trust Party (AMANAH), a component party of the Pakatan Harapan (PH) coalition and was a member of the Malaysian Islamic Party (PAS), a component party of formerly the Pakatan Rakyat (PR) coalition.

== Election results ==
Selangor State Legislative Assembly
Year	Constituency	Candidate	Votes	Pct	Opponent(s)	Votes	Pct	Ballots cast	Majority	Turnout
2004	N53 Morib	Hasnul Baharuddin (PAS)	5,361	29.98%	Hasiman Sidom (UMNO)	12,523	70.02%	17,884	7,162	75.86%
2013	N53 Morib	Hasnul Baharuddin (PAS)	15,016	51.31%	Hasiman Sidom (UMNO)	14,250	48.69%	29,746	766	88.80%
2018	N53 Morib	Hasnul Baharuddin (AMANAH)	11,000	40.43%	Rozana Kamarulzaman (UMNO)	8,883	32.64%	27,650	2,117	86.60%
2018	N53 Morib	Hasnul Baharuddin (AMANAH)	11,000	40.43%	Mohammad Sallehuddin Hafiz (PAS)	7,328	26.93%	27,650	2,117	86.60%
2023	N53 Morib	Hasnul Baharuddin (AMANAH)	15,093	44.35%	Rosnizan Ahmad (BERSATU)	18,936	55.65%	34,217	3,843	78.07%

== Honours ==
- Selangor
  - Recipient of the Distinguished Conduct Medal (PPT) (2010)
