= Bryan Lai Wai Chong =

Malaysian politician and businessman

Lai Wai Chong
- 黎潍裮

Member of the Selangor State Legislative Assembly for Teratai
- In office 9 May 2018 – 12 August 2023
- Preceded by: Tiew Way Keng (PR–DAP)
- Succeeded by: Yew Jia Haur (PH–DAP)
- Majority: 29,425 (2018)

Personal details
- Party: Democratic Action Party (DAP) (–2021); Heritage Party (WARISAN) (since 2021)
- Other political affiliations: Pakatan Rakyat (PR) (2008–2015); Pakatan Harapan (PH) (2015–2021)
- Occupation: Politician; businessman

Bryan Lai Wai Chong

Chinese name
- Traditional Chinese: 黎濰裮
- Simplified Chinese: 黎潍裮
Transcriptions
Standard Mandarin
- Hanyu Pinyin: Lí Wéichāng

Lai Wai Chong (simplified Chinese: 黎潍裮; traditional Chinese: 黎濰裮; pinyin: Lí Wéichāng) also known as Bryan Lai Wai Chong is a Malaysian politician and businessman who served as Member of the Selangor State Legislative Assembly (MLA) for Teratai from May 2018 to August 2023. He is a member of the Heritage Party (WARISAN) and was a member and State Organising Secretary of Selangor of the Democratic Action Party (DAP), a component party of the Pakatan Harapan (PH) and formerly Pakatan Rakyat (PR) coalitions.

== Election results ==
Selangor State Legislative Assembly
Year	Constituency	Candidate	Votes	Pct	Opponent(s)	Votes	Pct	Ballots cast	Majority	Turnout
2018	N22 Teratai	Lai Wai Chong (DAP)	34,453	76.91%	Mohd Irman Abdul Wahab (PAS)	5,028	11.22%	45,171	29,425	86.44%
2018	N22 Teratai	Lai Wai Chong (DAP)	34,453	76.91%	Liew Pok Boon (Gerakan)	4,784	10.68%	45,171	29,425	86.44%
2018	N22 Teratai	Lai Wai Chong (DAP)	34,453	76.91%	Lee Ying Ha (PRM)	529	1.18%	45,171	29,425	86.44%

Parliament of Malaysia
Year	Constituency	Candidate	Votes	Pct	Opponent(s)	Votes	Pct	Ballots cast	Majority	Turnout
2022	P099 Ampang	Lai Wai Chong (WARISAN)	1,423	1.36%	Rodziah Ismail (PKR)	56,754	54.35%	104,432	29,681	78.23%
2022	P099 Ampang	Lai Wai Chong (WARISAN)	1,423	1.36%	Sasha Lyna Abdul Latif (BERSATU)	27,073	25.92%	104,432	29,681	78.23%
2022	P099 Ampang	Lai Wai Chong (WARISAN)	1,423	1.36%	Ivone Low Yi Wen (MCA)	11,509	11.02%	104,432	29,681	78.23%
2022	P099 Ampang	Lai Wai Chong (WARISAN)	1,423	1.36%	Zuraida Kamaruddin (PBM)	4,589	4.39%	104,432	29,681	78.23%
2022	P099 Ampang	Lai Wai Chong (WARISAN)	1,423	1.36%	Nurul Ashikin Mabahwi (PEJUANG)	2,653	2.54%	104,432	29,681	78.23%
2022	P099 Ampang	Lai Wai Chong (WARISAN)	1,423	1.36%	Muhammad Syafiq Izwan Mohd Yunos (IND)	188	0.18%	104,432	29,681	78.23%
2022	P099 Ampang	Lai Wai Chong (WARISAN)	1,423	1.36%	Raveendran Marnokaran (IND)	148	0.14%	104,432	29,681	78.23%
2022	P099 Ampang	Lai Wai Chong (WARISAN)	1,423	1.36%	Tan Hua Meng (IND)	93	0.09%	104,432	29,681	78.23%
