= Teratai =

State constituency in Selangor, Malaysia

Teratai (N22)
Selangor constituency

State constituency
- Legislature: Selangor State Legislative Assembly
MLA
Yew Jia Haur
PH
- Constituency created: 2003
- First contested: 2004
- Last contested: 2023

Demographics
- Population (2020): 125,248
- Electors (2023): 76,579

Teratai is a state constituency in Selangor, Malaysia, that has been represented in the Selangor State Legislative Assembly since 2004. It has been represented by Yew Jia Haur of Pakatan Harapan (PH) since 2023.

The state constituency was created in the 2003 redistribution and is mandated to return a single member to the Selangor State Legislative Assembly under the first past the post voting system.

== Demographics ==
Ethnic breakdown of Teratai's electorate as of 2023
1. Chinese (61.6%)
2. Malay (26.6%)
3. Indian (8.16%)
4. Other ethnicities (3.59%)

== History ==
=== Polling districts ===
According to the gazette issued on 30 March 2018, the Teratai constituency has a total of 16 polling districts.

State constituency	Polling districts	Code	Location
Teratai（N22）	Pandan Perdana Timur	100/22/01	SK Pandan Perdana
Teratai（N22）	Taman Muda Timur	100/22/02	SK Taman Muda
Teratai（N22）	Taman Putra	100/22/03	Dewan Orang Ramai Taman Putra
Teratai（N22）	Taman Seraya	100/22/04	SMK Taman Seraya
Teratai（N22）	Taman Melor	100/22/05	SMK Taman Seraya
Teratai（N22）	Taman Mega Jaya	100/22/06	Dewan Utama Taman Mega Jaya
Teratai（N22）	Taman Mawar	100/22/07	Taski Abim Mawar Taman Mawar
Teratai（N22）	Taman Bukit Teratai	100/22/08	SK Taman Bukit Teratai
Teratai（N22）	Pandan Perdana Barat	100/22/09	SK Pandan Perdana
Teratai（N22）	Kampung Cheras Bahru Barat	100/22/10	SK Kampung Cheras Bahru
Teratai（N22）	Taman Muda Barat	100/22/11	SK Taman Muda
Teratai（N22）	Taman Saga	100/22/12	Dewan Orang Ramai Taman Saga
Teratai（N22）	Cheras Hartamas	100/22/13	Dewan MPAJ Cheras Hartamas
Teratai（N22）	Tasik Permai	100/22/14	SK Tasek Permai
Teratai（N22）	Pandan Indah Jalan 5	100/22/15	SK Pandan Indah
Teratai（N22）	Pandan Mewah	100/22/16	SMK Pandan Mewah

=== Representation history ===
Members of the Legislative Assembly for Teratai
Assembly	No	Years	Member	Party
Constituency created from Pandan and Lembah Jaya
11th	N22	2004–2008	Yap Soo Sun (刘永强)	BN (MCA)
12th	N22	2008–2013	Lee Ying Ha (李映霞)	PR (DAP)
13th	N22	2013–2015	Tiew Way Keng (张菲倩)	PR (DAP)
13th	N22	2015–2018	Tiew Way Keng (张菲倩)	PH (DAP)
14th	N22	2018–2021	Bryan Lai Wai Chong (黎潍裮)	PH (DAP)
14th	N22	2021–2022	Bryan Lai Wai Chong (黎潍裮)	Independent
14th	N22	2022–2023	Bryan Lai Wai Chong (黎潍裮)	WARISAN
15th	N22	2023–present	Yew Jia Haur (游佳豪)	PH (DAP)

== Election results ==
Selangor state election, 2023: Teratai
Party	Candidate	Votes	%	∆%
PH	Yew Jia Haur	42,519	80.07	▲3.16
PN	Chew Han Keai	10,586	19.93	▲19.93
Total valid votes		53,105	100.00	
Total rejected ballots		222		
Unreturned ballots		48		
Turnout		53,375	67.07	▼19.37
Registered electors		79,579		
Majority		31,933	60.14	▼5.55
PH hold		Swing		

Selangor state election, 2018: Teratai
Party	Candidate	Votes	%	∆%
PKR	Bryan Lai Wai Chong	34,453	76.91	▲76.91
PAS	Mohd Irman Abdul Wahab	5,028	11.22	▲11.22
BN	Liew Pok Boon	4,784	10.68	▼17.29
Parti Rakyat Malaysia	Lee Ying Ha	529	1.18	▲1.18
Total valid votes		44,794	100.00	
Total rejected ballots		273		
Unreturned ballots		104		
Turnout		45,171	86.44	▼1.87
Registered electors		52,256		
Majority		29,425	65.69	▲27.28
PKR hold		Swing		

Selangor state election, 2013: Teratai
Party	Candidate	Votes	%	∆%
DAP	Tiew Way Keng	23,578	66.38	▼1.16
BN	Liew Pok Boon	9,932	27.97	▼4.49
Independent	Lee Ying Ha	1,832	5.16	▲5.16
Independent	Chin Kok Keong	115	0.32	▲0.32
Independent	Lim Ah Chai	61	0.17	
Total valid votes		35,518	100.00	
Total rejected ballots		501		
Unreturned ballots		67		
Turnout		36,086	88.31	▲11.68
Registered electors		40,862		
Majority		13,646	38.41	▲3.33
DAP hold		Swing		
Source(s) "Federal Government Gazette - Notice of Contested Election, State Legislative Assembly for the State of Selangor [P.U. (B) 192/2013]" (PDF). Attorney General's Chambers of Malaysia. 26 April 2013. Archived from the original (PDF) on 2019-12-29. "Federal Government Gazette - Results of Contested Election and Statements of the Poll after the Official Addition of Votes, State Constituencies for the State of Selangor [P.U. (B) 233/2013]". Attorney General's Chambers of Malaysia. 22 May 2013. Archived from the original (PDF) on 2018-10-02.

Selangor state election, 2008: Teratai
Party	Candidate	Votes	%	∆%
DAP	Lee Ying Ha	15,563	67.54	▲11.80
BN	Lum Weng Keong	7,478	32.46	▼11.80
Total valid votes		23,041	100.00	
Total rejected ballots		692		
Unreturned ballots		0		
Turnout		23,733	76.63	▲0.67
Registered electors		30,972		
Majority		8,085	35.08	▲23.60
DAP gain from BN		Swing		?

Selangor state election, 2004: Teratai
Party	Candidate	Votes	%
BN	Yap Soo Sun	10,880	55.74
DAP	Khong Chee Seng	8,639	44.26
Total valid votes		19,519	100.00
Total rejected ballots		955	
Unreturned ballots		22	
Turnout		20,496	75.96
Registered electors		26,981	
Majority		2,241	11.48
This was a new constituency created.
