= Ampang Jaya (federal constituency) =

Selangor constituency

Defunct federal constituency
- Legislature: Dewan Rakyat
- Constituency created: 1984
- Constituency abolished: 2004
- First contested: 1986
- Last contested: 1999

Ampang Jaya was a federal constituency in Selangor, Malaysia, that was represented in the Dewan Rakyat from 1986 to 2004.

The federal constituency was created in the 1984 redistribution and was mandated to return a single member to the Dewan Rakyat under the first past the post voting system.

== History ==
It was abolished in 2004 when it was redistributed.

=== Representation history ===
Members of Parliament for Ampang Jaya
| Parliament | No | Years | Member | Party | Vote Share |
Constituency created from Ulu Langat
| 7th | P088 | 1986–1988 | Lim Ann Koon (林安熴) | BN (MCA) | 36,700; 85.99% |
| 7th | P088 | 1989–1990 | Ong Tee Keat (翁诗杰) | BN (MCA) | 23,719; 54.59% |
| 8th | P088 | 1990–1995 | Ong Tee Keat (翁诗杰) | BN (MCA) | 39,304; 60.23% |
| 9th | P092 | 1995–1999 | Ong Tee Keat (翁诗杰) | BN (MCA) | 45,282; 76.10% |
| 10th | P092 | 1999–2004 | Ong Tee Keat (翁诗杰) | BN (MCA) | 40,669; 55.28% |
Constituency abolished, split into Ampang and Pandan

=== State constituency ===
| Parliamentary constituency | State constituency | | | | | | |
| Parliamentary constituency | 1955–59* | 1959–1974 | 1974–1986 | 1986–1995 | 1995–2004 | 2004–2018 | 2018–present |
|---|---|---|---|---|---|---|---|
| Ampang Jaya | | | | | Ampang | | |
| Ampang Jaya | | | | Keramat | | | |
| Ampang Jaya | | | | | Lembah Jaya | | |
| Ampang Jaya | | | | Pandan | | | |
| Ampang Jaya | | | | Ulu Klang | | | |

=== Historical boundaries ===
| State Constituency | Area | |
| State Constituency | 1984 | 1994 |
|---|---|---|
| Ampang | | Ampang Jaya; Bukit Antarabangsa; Bukit Indah; Kuala Ampang; Taman Kelab Ukay |
| Keramat | Ampang Hilir; Ampang Jaya; Kampung Baru Ampang; Lembah Jaya; Taman Kosas | |
| Lembah Jaya | | Cheras Hartamas; Pandan Perdana; Kampung Indah Permai; Lembah Jaya; Taman Bukit Ampang |
| Pandan | Cheras Hartamas; Kampung Indah Permai; Kampung Tasik Tambahan; Pandan; Taman Muda | Ampang Hilir; Kampung Baru Ampang; Kampung Tasik Tambahan; Pandan Indah; Taman Muda |
| Ulu Klang | Bukit Antarabangsa; Kuala Ampang; Taman Melawati; Ukay Perdana; Ulu Klang | |

== Election results ==
Malaysian general election, 1999
| Party | Candidate | Votes | % | ∆% |
|---|---|---|---|---|
| BN | Ong Tee Keat | 40,669 | 55.28 | ▼20.82 |
| PKR | Sivarasa Rasiah | 32,902 | 44.72 | ▲44.72 |
| Total valid votes | | 73,571 | 100.00 | |
| Total rejected ballots | | 1,199 | | |
| Unreturned ballots | | 99 | | |
| Turnout | | 74,869 | 75.98 | ▲4.30 |
| Registered electors | | 98,527 | | |
| Majority | | 7,767 | 10.56 | ▼41.64 |
| BN hold | | Swing | | |

Malaysian general election, 1995
| Party | Candidate | Votes | % | ∆% |
|---|---|---|---|---|
| BN | Ong Tee Keat | 45,282 | 76.10 | ▲15.87 |
| S46 | Wan Mohd. Fuaad Wan Abdullah | 14,221 | 23.90 | ▼15,87 |
| Total valid votes | | 59,503 | 100.00 | |
| Total rejected ballots | | 1,777 | | |
| Unreturned ballots | | 328 | | |
| Turnout | | 61,608 | 71.68 | ▼3.24 |
| Registered electors | | 85,954 | | |
| Majority | | 31,061 | 52.20 | ▲31.74 |
| BN hold | | Swing | | |

Malaysian general election, 1990
| Party | Candidate | Votes | % | ∆% |
|---|---|---|---|---|
| BN | Ong Tee Keat | 39,304 | 60.23 | ▲5.64 |
| S46 | Zainal Rampak | 25,954 | 39.77 | ▼5.03 |
| Total valid votes | | 65,258 | 100.00 | |
| Total rejected ballots | | 1,509 | | |
| Unreturned ballots | | 0 | | |
| Turnout | | 66,767 | 74.92 | ▲10.95 |
| Registered electors | | 89,112 | | |
| Majority | | 13,350 | 20.46 | ▲10.67 |
| BN hold | | Swing | | |

Malaysian general by-election, 28 January 1989 Upon the resignation of incumbent, Lim Ann Koon
| Party | Candidate | Votes | % | ∆% |
|---|---|---|---|---|
| BN | Ong Tee Keat | 23,719 | 54.59 | ▼31.40 |
| S46 | Harun Idris | 19,469 | 44.80 | ▲44.80 |
| Independent | Wang Ah Hoong | 109 | 0.25 | ▲0.25 |
| Independent | Syed Idrus Syed Ahmad | 49 | 0.11 | ▲0.11 |
| Independent | Loh Ah Ha | 43 | 0.10 | ▲0.10 |
| Independent | Adam Daim | 42 | 0.10 | ▲0.10 |
| Independent | Che Bakar Said | 22 | 0.05 | ▲0.05 |
| Total valid votes | | 43,453 | 100.00 | |
| Total rejected ballots | | 395 | | |
| Unreturned ballots | | 0 | | |
| Turnout | | 43,848 | 63.97 | ▼0.13 |
| Registered electors | | 68,546 | | |
| Majority | | 4,250 | 9.79 | ▼62.19 |
| BN hold | | Swing | | |

Malaysian general election, 1986
| Party | Candidate | Votes | % |
|---|---|---|---|
| BN | Lim Ann Koon | 36,700 | 85.99 |
| SDP | R. Thinakaran @ R. S. Menon | 5,979 | 14.01 |
| Total valid votes | | 42,679 | 100.00 |
| Total rejected ballots | | 1,911 | |
| Unreturned ballots | | 0 | |
| Turnout | | 44,590 | 63.84 |
| Registered electors | | 69,849 | |
| Majority | | 30,721 | 71.98 |
This was a new constituency created.
