= Ismail Kijo =

Malaysian politician (1952–2021)

Yang Berbahagia Dato' Ismail Kijo DPMS AMS PPN PJK
- إسماعيل کيجو

Member of the Selangor State Legislative Assembly for Lembah Jaya
- In office 24 April 1995 – 8 March 2008
- Preceded by: Constituency created
- Succeeded by: Khasim Abdul Aziz (PR–PAS)
- Majority: 13,413 (1995); 1,048 (1999); 9,307 (2004)

Personal details
- Born: Ismail bin Kijo; 28 May 1952 Kampung Bukit Badong, Kuala Selangor, Selangor, Federation of Malaya (now Malaysia)
- Died: 3 February 2021 (aged 68) Sungai Buloh, Selangor, Malaysia
- Resting place: Ukay Perdana Muslim Cemetery, Ampang, Selangor
- Citizenship: Malaysian
- Party: United Malays National Organisation (UMNO) (–2021)
- Other political affiliations: Barisan Nasional (BN) (–2021)
- Education: Universiti Kebangsaan Malaysia
- Occupation: Politician

Ismail bin Kijo (28 May 1952 – 3 February 2021) was a Malaysian politician who served as Member of the Selangor State Legislative Assembly (MLA) for Lembah Jaya from April 1995 to March 2008. A member of the United Malays National Organisation (UMNO), a component of Barisan Nasional (BN) coalition, he also served as the UMNO's Ampang division chief.

== Death ==
On 3 February 2021, Ismail died at Sungai Buloh Hospital at 12.30 p.m. from COVID-19 during the COVID-19 pandemic in Malaysia. He was 68.

== Election results ==
Selangor State Legislative Assembly
Year	Constituency	Candidate	Votes	Pct	Opponent(s)	Votes	Pct	Ballots cast	Majority	Turnout
1995	N21 Lembah Jaya	Ismail Kijo (UMNO)	17,262	81.77%	Sarom Jais (PAS)	3,849	18.23%	21,862	13,413	73.85%
1999	N21 Lembah Jaya	Ismail Kijo (UMNO)	14,267	54.22%	Iskandar Abdul Samad (PAS)	12,013	45.78%	26,770	1,048	77.66%
2004	N20 Lembah Jaya	Ismail Kijo (UMNO)	17,092	68.71%	Wan Hasrina Wan Hassan (PAS)	7,785	31.29%	25,230	9,307	70.49%
2008	N20 Lembah Jaya	Ismail Kijo (UMNO)	12,954	46.04%	Khasim Abdul Aziz (PAS)	15,182	53.96%	28,697	2,228	74.64%

== Honours ==
=== Honours of Malaysia ===
- Malaysia
  - Medal of the Order of the Defender of the Realm (PPN) (1992)
- Selangor
  - Knight Commander of the Order of the Crown of Selangor (DPMS) – Dato' (2001)
  - Member of the Order of the Crown of Selangor (AMS) (1997)
  - Recipient of the Meritorious Service Medal (PJK) (1988)

== See also ==
- List of deaths due to COVID-19 - notable individual deaths
