= Morib (state constituency) =

State constituency in Selangor, Malaysia

Morib (N53)
Selangor constituency

State constituency
- Legislature: Selangor State Legislative Assembly
MLA
Rosnizan Ahmad
PN
- Constituency created: 1958
- First contested: 1959
- Last contested: 2023

Demographics
- Electors (2023): 43,828

Morib is a state constituency in Selangor, Malaysia, that has been represented in the Selangor State Legislative Assembly since 1959. It has been represented by Rosnizan Ahmad of Perikatan Nasional (PN) since 2023.

The state constituency was created in the 1958 redistribution and is mandated to return a single member to the Selangor State Legislative Assembly under the first past the post voting system.

== Demographics ==
Ethnic breakdown of Morib's electorate as of 2023
1. Malay (71.1%)
2. Indian (15.4%)
3. Chinese (10.6%)
4. Other ethnicities (2.86%)

== History ==
=== Polling districts ===
According to the federal gazette issued on 30 March 2018, the Morib constituency is divided into 13 polling districts.

State constituency	Polling Districts	Code	Location
Morib（N53）	Sungai Buaya	112/53/01	SK Sungai Buaya
Morib（N53）	Sungai Buaya Tengah	112/53/02	SK Sungai Buaya
Morib（N53）	Bandar	112/53/03	SK Bandar
Morib（N53）	Jugra	112/53/04	SK Permatang Pasir
Morib（N53）	Sungai Raba	112/53/05	SJK (T) Jugra
Morib（N53）	Kanchong	112/53/06	SK Kanchong Darat
Morib（N53）	Kelanang	112/53/07	SK Seri Lanang Banting
Morib（N53）	Kanchong Timur	112/53/08	SMA Unwanus Saadah Kanchong Darat
Morib（N53）	Kanchong Tengah	112/53/09	SK Kanchong Tengah
Morib（N53）	Simpang Morib	112/53/10	SJK (T) Simpang Morib
Morib（N53）	Morib	112/53/11	SK Morib
Morib（N53）	Sri Putra	112/53/12	SRA Banting
Morib（N53）	Taman Kemuning	112/54/13	SMK Bandar Banting

=== Representation history ===
Members of the Legislative Assembly for Morib
Assembly	No	Years	Member	Party
Constituency created
1st	N22	1959-1964	Mohamed Tahir Abdul Majid	Alliance (UMNO)
2nd	N22	1964-1969	Harun Idris	Alliance (UMNO)
		1969-1971	Assembly dissolved	
3rd	N22	1971-1973	Harun Idris	Alliance (UMNO)
3rd	N22	1973-1974	Harun Idris	BN (UMNO)
4th	N30	1974-1978	Harun Idris	BN (UMNO)
4th	N30	1978	Ishak Pangat @ Shafaat	BN (UMNO)
5th	N30	1978-1982	Ishak Pangat @ Shafaat	BN (UMNO)
6th	N30	1982-1986	Abu Bakar Abdul Hamid	BN (UMNO)
7th	N38	1986-1990	Abu Bakar Abdul Hamid	BN (UMNO)
8th	N38	1990-1995	Abu Bakar Abdul Hamid	BN (UMNO)
9th	N45	1995-1999	Samat @ Abd Samad Maharudin	BN (UMNO)
10th	N45	1999-2004	Samat @ Abd Samad Maharudin	BN (UMNO)
11th	N53	2004-2008	Hasiman Sidom	BN (UMNO)
12th	N53	2008-2013	Hasiman Sidom	BN (UMNO)
13th	N53	2013-2015	Hasnul Baharuddin	PR (PAS)
13th	N53	2015-2018	Hasnul Baharuddin	AMANAH
14th	N53	2018-2023	Hasnul Baharuddin	PH (AMANAH)
15th	N53	2023–present	Rosnizan Ahmad	PN (BERSATU)

== Election results ==
Selangor state election, 2023
Party	Candidate	Votes	%	∆%
PN	Rosnizan Ahmad	18,936	55.65	▲55.65
PH	Hasnul Baharuddin	15,093	44.35	▲3.93
Total valid votes		34,029	100.00	
Total rejected ballots		188		
Unreturned ballots		29		
Turnout		34,246	78.14	▼8.42
Registered electors		43,828		
Majority		3,843	11.30	▲3.52
PN gain from PKR		Swing		.

Selangor state election, 2018
Party	Candidate	Votes	%	∆%
PKR	Hasnul Baharuddin	11,000	40.42	▲40.42
BN	Rozana Kamarulzaman	8,883	32.64	▼16.05
PAS	Mohammad Sallehuddin Hafiz	7,329	26.93	▼24.38
Total valid votes		27,212	100.00	
Total rejected ballots		352		
Unreturned ballots		86		
Turnout		27,650	86.56	▼2.29
Registered electors		31,945		
Majority		2,117	7.78	▲5.16
PKR gain from PAS		Swing		.

Selangor state election, 2013
Party	Candidate	Votes	%	∆%
PAS	Hasnul Baharuddin	15,016	51.31	▲2.03
BN	Hasiman Sidom	14,250	48.69	▼2.03
Total valid votes		29,266	100.00	
Total rejected ballots		480		
Unreturned ballots		65		
Turnout		29,811	88.85	▲8.48
Registered electors		33,553		
Majority		766	2.62	▲1.18
PAS gain from BN		Swing		?
Source(s) "Federal Government Gazette - Notice of Contested Election, State Legislative Assembly for the State of Selangor [P.U. (B) 192/2013]" (PDF). Attorney General's Chambers of Malaysia. 26 April 2013. Archived from the original (PDF) on 29 December 2019. "Federal Government Gazette - Results of Contested Election and Statements of the Poll after the Official Addition of Votes, State Constituencies for the State of Selangor [P.U. (B) 233/2013]" (PDF). Attorney General's Chambers of Malaysia. 22 May 2013. Archived from the original (PDF) on 2 October 2018.

Selangor state election, 2008
Party	Candidate	Votes	%	∆%
BN	Hasiman Sidom	10,116	50.72	▼19.30
PAS	Mohammad Sallehuddin Hafiz	9,830	49.28	▲19.30
Total valid votes		19,946	100.00	
Total rejected ballots		404		
Unreturned ballots		185		
Turnout		20,535	80.37	▲4.51
Registered electors		25,549		
Majority		286	1.44	▼38.60
BN hold		Swing		

Selangor state election, 2004
Party	Candidate	Votes	%	∆%
BN	Hasiman Sidom	12,523	70.02	▲12.12
PAS	Hasnul Baharuddin	5,361	29.98	▼12.12
Total valid votes		17,884	100.00	
Total rejected ballots		441		
Unreturned ballots		88		
Turnout		18,413	75.86	▲1.61
Registered electors		24,273		
Majority		7,162	40.04	▲24.24
BN hold		Swing		

Selangor state election, 1999
Party	Candidate	Votes	%	∆%
BN	Samat @ Abd Samad Maharudin	7,997	57.90	▼15.09
PAS	Ramli Sidom	5,815	42.10	▲42.10
Total valid votes		13,812	100.00	
Total rejected ballots		461		
Unreturned ballots		212		
Turnout		14,485	74.25	▲1.04
Registered electors		19,509		
Majority		2,182	15.80	▼30.18
BN hold		Swing		

Selangor state election, 1995
Party	Candidate	Votes	%	∆%
BN	Samat @ Abd Samad Maharudin	9,166	72.99	▲4.46
S46	Abu Said Baharom	3,392	27.01	▼4.46
Total valid votes		12,558	100.00	
Total rejected ballots		509		
Unreturned ballots		52		
Turnout		13,119	73.21	▼3.24
Registered electors		17,919		
Majority		5,774	45.98	▲8.92
BN hold		Swing		

Selangor state election, 1990
Party	Candidate	Votes	%	∆%
BN	Abu Bakar Abdul Hamid	7,240	68.53	▼14.17
S46	Harun Idris	3,325	31.47	▲31.47
Total valid votes		10,565	100.00	
Total rejected ballots		527		
Unreturned ballots		0		
Turnout		11,092	76.45	▲3.41
Registered electors		14,509		
Majority		3,915	37.06	▼28.34
BN hold		Swing		

Selangor state election, 1986
Party	Candidate	Votes	%	∆%
BN	Abu Bakar Abdul Hamid	7,379	82.70	▲11.33
NASMA	Mohd Khaile Tusiman	1,544	17.30	▲17.30
Total valid votes		8,923	100.00	
Total rejected ballots		384		
Unreturned ballots		0		
Turnout		9,307	73.04	▼3.98
Registered electors		12,742		
Majority		5,835	65.40	▲19.00
BN hold		Swing		

Selangor state election, 1982
Party	Candidate	Votes	%	∆%
BN	Abu Bakar Abdul Hamid	6,011	71.37	▲16.34
Independent	Ismail Sekak	2,103	24.97	▼20.00
PAS	Ahmad Mastar	308	3.66	▲3.66
Total valid votes		8,422	100.00	
Total rejected ballots		294		
Unreturned ballots		0		
Turnout		8,716	77.02	
Registered electors		11,317		
Majority		3,908	46.40	▲36.34
BN hold		Swing		

Selangor state election, 1978
Party	Candidate	Votes	%	∆%
BN	Ishak Pangat @ Shafaat	3,657	55.03	▲2.45
Independent	Ismail Sekak	2,988	44.97	▲44.97
Total valid votes		6,507	100.00	
Total rejected ballots		246		
Unreturned ballots		0		
Turnout		6,753	75.25	▼3.12
Registered electors		8,974		
Majority		1,511	23.22	▼36.03
BN hold		Swing		

Selangor state by-election, 6 May 1978 Upon the resignation of incumbent, Harun Idris
Party	Candidate	Votes	%	∆%
BN	Ishak Pangat @ Shafaat	3,740	57.48	▼22.15
Independent	Er Chue Chin	2,229	34.26	▲34.26
Independent	Ismail Sekak	538	8.27	▲8.27
Total valid votes		6,507	100.00	
Total rejected ballots		246		
Unreturned ballots		0		
Turnout		6,753	75.25	▼3.35
Registered electors		8,974		
Majority		1,511	23.22	▼36.04
BN hold		Swing		

Selangor state election, 1974
Party	Candidate	Votes	%	∆%
BN	Harun Idris	4,045	79.63	▲16.34
DAP	Idris Idrus	1,035	20.37	▲20.37
Total valid votes		5,080	100.00	
Total rejected ballots		227		
Unreturned ballots		0		
Turnout		5,307	78.60	▲5.66
Registered electors		6,752		
Majority		3,010	59.26	▲32.68
BN gain from Alliance Party (Malaysia) Party (Malaysia)		Swing		?

Selangor state election, 1969
Party	Candidate	Votes	%	∆%
Alliance	Harun Idris	5,038	63.29	▲0.52
PMIP	Mohd. Shahid Arshad	2,922	36.71	▲36.71
Total valid votes		7,960	100.00	
Total rejected ballots		1,121		
Unreturned ballots		0		
Turnout		9,081	72.94	▼7.67
Registered electors		12,450		
Majority		2,116	26.58	▲1.04
Alliance hold		Swing		

Selangor state election, 1964
Party	Candidate	Votes	%	∆%
Alliance	Harun Idris	4,760	62.77	▼5.97
Socialist Front	Abdul Aziz Ishak	2,823	37.23	▲37.23
Total valid votes		7,583	100.00	
Total rejected ballots		622		
Unreturned ballots		0		
Turnout		8,205	80.61	▼3.63
Registered electors		10,179		
Majority		1,937	25.54	▼26.76
Alliance hold		Swing		

Selangor state election, 1959
Party	Candidate	Votes	%
Alliance	Mohamed Tahir Abdul Majid	4,888	68.74
PMIP	Adni Kusas	1,169	16.44
National Party	Raja Adnan Raja Basok	1,054	14.82
Total valid votes		7,111	100.00
Total rejected ballots		150	
Unreturned ballots		0	
Turnout		7,261	84.24
Registered electors		8,619	
Majority		3,719	52.30
This was a new constituency created.
