= Chempaka (Selangor state constituency) =

Selangor constituency

Defunct state constituency
- Legislature: Selangor State Legislative Assembly
- Constituency created: 2003
- Constituency abolished: 2018
- First contested: 2004
- Last contested: 2013

Chempaka was a state constituency in Selangor, Malaysia, that has been represented in the Selangor State Legislative Assembly since 2004 until 2018.

== History ==
2004–2016: The constituency contains the polling districts of Taman Nirwana, Angsana Hilir, Kampung Pandan Dalam Kiri, Lorong Raya Kampung Pandan, Pandan Jaya Utara, Taman Chempaka, Kampung Baharu Ampang Ketiga, Pandan Indah Jalan 1, 4 dan 6, Taman Dagang, Taman Cahaya, Lorong Molek Kampung Pandan, Lorong Bersih Kampung Pandan, Pandan Jaya Selatan, Taman Bakti, Pandan Indah Jalan 5, Pandan Mewah, Pandan Indah Jalan 2 & 3.

=== Representation history ===
Members of the Legislative Assembly for Chempaka
| Assembly | No | Years | Member | Party |
Constituency created from Pandan
| 11th | N21 | 2004–2008 | Mad Aris Mad Yusof | BN (UMNO) |
| 12th | N21 | 2008–2013 | Iskandar Abdul Samad | PR (PAS) |
| 13th | N21 | 2013–2015 | Iskandar Abdul Samad | PR (PAS) |
| 13th | N21 | 2015–2016 | Iskandar Abdul Samad | PAS |
| 13th | N21 | 2016–2018 | Iskandar Abdul Samad | GS (PAS) |
Constituency renamed to Pandan Indah

== Election results ==
Selangor state election, 2013
| Party | Candidate | Votes | % | ∆% |
|---|---|---|---|---|
| PAS | Iskandar Abdul Samad | 23,117 | 63.12 | ▲10.94 |
| BN | Muhammad Faizal Sufar | 13,509 | 36.88 | ▼10.94 |
| Total valid votes | | 36,626 | 100.00 | |
| Total rejected ballots | | 432 | 1.18 | |
| Unreturned ballots | | 84 | | |
| Turnout | | 37,142 | 86.39 | ▲13.25 |
| Registered electors | | 42,995 | | |
| Majority | | 9,608 | 26.23 | ▲21.86 |
| PAS hold | | Swing | | ▲10.93 |
Source(s) "Federal Government Gazette - Notice of Contested Election, State Legislative Assembly for the State of Selangor [P.U. (B) 192/2013]" (PDF). Attorney General's Chambers of Malaysia. 26 April 2013. Archived from the original (PDF) on 29 December 2019. "Federal Government Gazette - Results of Contested Election and Statements of the Poll after the Official Addition of Votes, State Constituencies for the State of Selangor [P.U. (B) 233/2013]" (PDF). Attorney General's Chambers of Malaysia. 22 May 2013. Archived from the original (PDF) on 2 October 2018."undi.info N21 CHEMPAKA".

Selangor state election, 2008
| Party | Candidate | Votes | % | ∆% |
|---|---|---|---|---|
| PAS | Iskandar Abdul Samad | 12,528 | 52.18 | ▲52.18 |
| BN | Nosimah Hashim | 11,480 | 47.82 | ▼17.90 |
| Total valid votes | | 24,008 | 100.00 | |
| Total rejected ballots | | 396 | 1.65 | |
| Unreturned ballots | | 115 | | |
| Turnout | | 24,519 | 73.14 | ▲9.92 |
| Registered electors | | 33,525 | | |
| Majority | | 1,048 | 4.37 | ▼27.08 |
| PAS gain from BN | | Swing | | ? |
Source(s) "undi.info N21 CHEMPAKA".

Selangor state election, 2004
| Party | Candidate | Votes | % |
|---|---|---|---|
| BN | Mad Aris Mad Yusof | 12,654 | 65.72 |
| PKR | Mohd Fauzi Yusoff | 6,599 | 34.28 |
| Total valid votes | | 19,253 | 100.00 |
| Total rejected ballots | | 243 | 1.26 |
| Unreturned ballots | | 41 | |
| Turnout | | 19,537 | 63.22 |
| Registered electors | | 30,903 | |
| Majority | | 6,055 | 31.45 |
This was a new constituency created.
Source(s) "undi.info N21 CHEMPAKA".
