= Yew Jia Haur =

Malaysian politician

Yang Berhormat Tuan Yew Jia Haur MLA
- 游佳豪

Member of the Selangor State Legislative Assembly for Teratai
- Incumbent
- Assumed office 12 August 2023
- Preceded by: Bryan Lai Wai Chong (PH–DAP)
- Majority: 31,933 (2023)

Personal details
- Born: Yew Jia Haur; 23 December 1978 (age 47) Selangor, Malaysia
- Citizenship: Malaysian
- Party: Democratic Action Party (DAP)
- Other political affiliations: Pakatan Harapan (PH)
- Occupation: Politician

Yew Jia Haur

Chinese name
- Traditional Chinese: 游佳豪
- Simplified Chinese: 游佳豪
Transcriptions
Standard Mandarin
- Hanyu Pinyin: Yóu Jiāháo

Yew Jia Haur (Chinese: 游佳豪; pinyin: Yóu Jiāháo; born 23 December 1978) is a Malaysian politician who has served as Member of the Selangor State Legislative Assembly (MLA) for Teratai since August 2023. He is a member of the Democratic Action Party (DAP), a component party of the Pakatan Harapan (PH) coalition.

== Election results ==
Selangor State Legislative Assembly
Year	Constituency	Candidate	Votes	Pct	Opponent(s)	Votes	Pct	Ballots cast	Majority	Turnout
2023	N22 Teratai	Yew Jia Haur (DAP)	42,519	80.07%	Chew Han Keai (BERSATU)	10,586	19.93%	53,375	31,933	67.07%
