= Izham Hashim =

Malaysian politician

Yang Berhormat Dato' Ir. Izham Hashim DPMS MLA
- إظهام هاشم

Member of the Selangor State Executive Council
- Incumbent
- Assumed office 21 August 2023 (Infrastructure Development, Agriculture & Plantation Modernisation and Food Security & Agro-based Industry)
- Monarch: Sharafuddin
- Menteri Besar: Amirudin Shari
- Preceded by: Himself
- Constituency: Pandan Indah
- In office 14 May 2018 – 21 August 2023 (Infrastructure, Public Utilities, Modernisation of Agriculture and Agro-based Industry)
- Monarch: Sharafuddin
- Menteri Besar: Azmin Ali (2018); Amirudin Shari (2018–2023)
- Preceded by: Zaidy Abdul Talib
- Succeeded by: Himself
- Constituency: Pandan Indah

Member of the Selangor State Legislative Assembly for Pandan Indah
- Incumbent
- Assumed office 9 May 2018
- Preceded by: Iskandar Abdul Samad (PR–PAS)
- Majority: 16,386 (2018); 10,591 (2023)

Treasurer-General of the National Trust Party
- Incumbent
- Assumed office 2019
- President: Mohamad Sabu
- Preceded by: Adly Zahari

State Chairman of the National Trust Party of Selangor
- Incumbent
- Assumed office 2015
- President: Mohamad Sabu
- Deputy: Saari Sungib (2015–2019); Azli Yusof (since 2019)

Faction represented in the Selangor State Legislative Assembly
- 2018–: Pakatan Harapan

Personal details
- Born: Izham bin Hashim; March 24, 1962 (age 64) Selangor, Malaysia
- Citizenship: Malaysia
- Party: National Trust Party (AMANAH)
- Other political affiliations: Pakatan Harapan (PH)
- Children: 4
- Education: University of Newcastle Upon Tyne (BSc); Universiti Malaya (MBA)
- Occupation: Politician
- Profession: Civil Engineer

Dato' Ir. Izham bin Hashim (born 24 March 1962) is a Malaysian politician who has served as Member of the Selangor State Executive Council (EXCO) under Menteris Besar Amirudin Shari and Azmin Ali as well as Member of the Selangor State Legislative Assembly (MLA) for Pandan Indah since May 2018. He is a member, Treasurer-General and State Chairman of Selangor of the National Trust Party (AMANAH), a component party of the Pakatan Harapan (PH) coalition.

== Election results ==
Selangor State Legislative Assembly
Year	Constituency	Candidate	Votes	Pct	Opponent(s)	Votes	Pct	Ballots cast	Majority	Turnout
2018	N21 Pandan Indah	Izham Hashim (AMANAH)	24,914	60.83%	Mohd Haniff Koalas (UMNO)	8,528	20.82%	41,331	16,386	84.20%
2018	N21 Pandan Indah	Izham Hashim (AMANAH)	24,914	60.83%	Iskandar Abdul Samad (PAS)	7,517	18.35%	41,331	16,386	84.20%
2023	N21 Pandan Indah	Izham Hashim (AMANAH)	27,878	59.95%	Fazil Mohamad Dali (BERSATU)	17,287	37.17%	46,502	10,591	65.70%
2023	N21 Pandan Indah	Izham Hashim (AMANAH)	27,878	59.95%	Noor Faralisa Redzuan (MUDA)	1,166	2.51%	46,502	10,591	65.70%
2023	N21 Pandan Indah	Izham Hashim (AMANAH)	27,878	59.95%	Sivaneswaran Ramasundram (IND)	171	0.37%	46,502	10,591	65.70%

== Honours ==
- Selangor
  - Knight Commander of the Order of the Crown of Selangor (DPMS) – Dato' (2024)
