= Pandan Indah (state constituency) =

State constituency in Selangor, Malaysia

Pandan Indah (N21)
Selangor constituency

State constituency
- Legislature: Selangor State Legislative Assembly
MLA
Izham Hashim
PH
- Constituency created: 2018
- First contested: 2018
- Last contested: 2023

Demographics
- Electors (2023): 70,776

Pandan Indah is a state constituency in Selangor, Malaysia, that has been represented in the Selangor State Legislative Assembly since 2018, replacing Chempaka which was used from 2004 until 2018. It has been represented by Member of the State Executive Council (EXCO) Izham Hashim of Pakatan Harapan (PH) since 2018.

== Demographics ==
Ethnic breakdown of Pandan Indah's electorate as of 2023
1. Malay (55.0%)
2. Chinese (30.9%)
3. Indian (7.54%)
4. Other ethnicities (6.51%)

== History ==
=== Polling districts ===
According to the gazette issued on 30 March 2018, the Pandan Indah constituency has a total of 18 polling districts.

State constituency	Polling districts	Code	Location
Pandan Indah（N21）	Taman Nirwana	100/21/01	SK Taman Nirwana, Ampang
Pandan Indah（N21）	Angsana Hilir	100/21/02	SRA Jalan F Kampung Pandan Dalam
Pandan Indah（N21）	Kampung Pandan Dalam Kiri	100/21/03	SRA Kampung Pandan Dalam Lorang Bahagia Lima
Pandan Indah（N21）	Lorong Raya Kampung Pandan	100/21/04	Dewan MPAJ Jalan H Kampung Pandan
Pandan Indah（N21）	Pandan Jaya Utara	100/21/05	SK Pandan Jaya
Pandan Indah（N21）	Taman Chempaka	100/21/06	Dewan Seberguna Taman Cempaka
Pandan Indah（N21）	Pandan Indah Jalan 1, 4 dan 6	100/21/07	SRA Pandan Indah
Pandan Indah（N21）	Lorong Molek Kampung Pandan	100/21/08	SRA Jalan F Kampung Pandan Dalam
Pandan Indah（N21）	Lorong Bersih Kampung Pandan	100/21/09	SRA Kampung Pandan Dalam Lorong Bahagia Lima
Pandan Indah（N21）	Pandan Jaya Selatan	100/21/10	SMK Pandan Jaya
Pandan Indah（N21）	Taman Bakti	100/21/11	Dewan Seberguna Taman Cempaka
Pandan Indah（N21）	Pandan Indah Jalan 2 & 3	100/21/12	SMK Pandan Indah
Pandan Indah（N21）	Ampang Hilir	100/21/13	Kompleks Muhibah Ampang Jaya
Pandan Indah（N21）	Cheras Indah	100/21/14	SK Cheras Indah
Pandan Indah（N21）	Taman Maju Jaya	100/21/15	SA Kelas Al-Quran & Fardhu Ain (KAFA) Integrasi Al-Mustaqimah Taman Cheras Indah
Pandan Indah（N21）	Taman Kenchana	100/21/16	SK Taman Muda
Pandan Indah（N21）	Kampung Cheras Bahru Timur	100/21/17	SK Kampong Cheras Bahru
Pandan Indah（N21）	Desa Nirwana	100/21/18	Kompleks Muhibah Ampang Jaya

=== Representation history ===
Members of the Legislative Assembly for Pandan Indah
Assembly	No	Years	Member	Party
Constituency created from Chempaka
14th	N21	2018–2023	Izham Hashim	PH (AMANAH)
15th	N21	2023–present	Izham Hashim	PH (AMANAH)

== Election results ==
Selangor state election, 2023
Party	Candidate	Votes	%	∆%
PH	Izham Hashim	27,878	59.95	▼0.88
PN	Fazil Mohamad Dali	17,287	37.17	▲37.17
MUDA	Noor Faralisa Redzuan	1,166	2.51	▲2.51
Independent	Sivaneswaram Ramasundram	171	0.37	▲0.37
Total valid votes		46,502	100.00	
Total rejected ballots		231		
Unreturned ballots		45		
Turnout		46,778	66.09	▼18.25
Registered electors		70,776		
Majority		10,591	22.78	▼17.23
PH hold		Swing		

Selangor state election, 2018
Party	Candidate	Votes	%
PKR	Izham Hashim	24,914	60.83
BN	Mohd Haniff Koslan	8,528	20.82
PAS	Iskandar Abdul Samad	7,517	18.35
Total valid votes		40,959	100.00
Total rejected ballots		250	
Unreturned ballots		122	
Turnout		41,331	84.34
Registered electors		49,063	
Majority		16,386	40.01
This new constituency was created
