= Lembah Jaya (state constituency) =

State constituency in Selangor, Malaysia

Lembah Jaya (N20)
Selangor constituency

State constituency
- Legislature: Selangor State Legislative Assembly
MLA
Syed Ahmad Syed Abdul Rahman Alhadad @ Altimet
PH
- Constituency created: 1994
- First contested: 1995
- Last contested: 2023

Demographics
- Electors (2023): 65,650

Lembah Jaya is a state constituency in Selangor, Malaysia, that has been represented in the Selangor State Legislative Assembly since 1995.

The state constituency was created in the 1994 redistribution and is mandated to return a single member to the Selangor State Legislative Assembly under the first past the post voting system. Since 2023, the State Assemblyman for Lembah Jaya is Syed Ahmad Syed Abdul Rahman @ Altimet is from Pakatan Harapan PKR.

== Demographics ==
Ethnic breakdown of Lembah Jaya's electorate as of 2023
1. Malay (56.8%)
2. Chinese (22.9%)
3. Indian (12.1%)
4. Other ethnicities (8.19%)

== History ==
=== Polling districts ===
According to the gazette issued on 30 March 2018, the Ampang constituency has a total of 18 polling districts.

State constituency	Polling districts	Code	Location
Lembah Jaya（N20)	Taman Tun Abdul Razak	099/20/01	Kelab Darul Ehsan Taman Tun Abdul Razak Ampang
Lembah Jaya（N20)	Lembah Jaya Utara	099/20/02	Dewan MPAJ Lembah Jaya
Lembah Jaya（N20)	Taman Kosas	099/20/03	SMK Taman Kosas
Lembah Jaya（N20)	Bukit Indah Jalan 1 & 2	099/20/04	SK Taman Bukit Indah
Lembah Jaya（N20)	Seri Watan	099/20/05	SMK Bandar Baru Ampang
Lembah Jaya（N20)	Seri Ampang	099/20/06	Dewan Orang Ramai Taman Sri Ampang
Lembah Jaya（N20)	Bukit Ampang	099/20/07	Dewan Orang Ramai Taman Sri Watan
Lembah Jaya（N20)	Tasik Tambahan Utara	099/20/08	SK Taman Tasik
Lembah Jaya（N20)	Ampang Campuran Jalan Ikan Emas	099/20/09	SK Ampang Campuran
Lembah Jaya（N20)	Lembah Jaya Selatan	099/20/10	SK Lembah Jaya
Lembah Jaya（N20)	Kampung Tengah Lembah Jaya	099/20/11	Dewan Orang Ramai Kampung Dato Mufti (Kampung Tengah)
Lembah Jaya（N20)	Taman Ampang Indah	099/20/12	SK Taman Kosas
Lembah Jaya（N20)	Taman Rasmi Jaya	099/20/13	SA Rakyat KAFA Integrasi Al-Huda Taman Rasmi Jaya
Lembah Jaya（N20)	Tasik Tambahan Selatan	099/20/14	SRA Tasik Tambahan
Lembah Jaya（N20)	Kampung Ampang Indah	099/20/15	SRA Lembah Jaya
Lembah Jaya（N20)	Taman Mulia Jaya	099/20/16	Tabika Perpaduan (RT) Taman Mulia Jaya
Lembah Jaya（N20)	Ampang Campuran Jalan Ikan Jelawat	099/20/17	Dewan Masyarakat Ampang Campuran
Lembah Jaya（N20)	Bukit Indah Jalan 3	099/20/18	SMK Bukit Indah

=== Representation history ===
Members of the Legislative Assembly for Lembah Jaya
Assembly	No	Years	Member	Party
Constituency created from Keramat, Hulu Kelang, Pandan and Dusun Tua
9th	N21	1995–1999	Ismail Kijo	BN (UMNO)
10th	N21	1999–2004	Ismail Kijo	BN (UMNO)
11th	N20	2004–2008	Ismail Kijo	BN (UMNO)
12th	N20	2008–2013	Khasim Abdul Aziz	PR (PAS)
13th	N20	2013–2015	Khasim Abdul Aziz	PR (PAS)
13th	N20	2015–2016	Khasim Abdul Aziz	PAS
13th	N20	2016–2018	Khasim Abdul Aziz	GS (PAS)
14th	N20	2018–2020	Haniza Mohamed Talha	PH (PKR)
14th	N20	2020–2022	Haniza Mohamed Talha	PN (BERSATU)
14th	N20	2020–2023	Haniza Mohamed Talha	PBM
15th	N20	2023–present	Syed Ahmad Syed Abdul Rahman Alhadad	PH (PKR)

== Election results ==
Selangor state election, 2023
Party	Candidate	Votes	%	∆%
PH	Syed Ahmad Syed Abdul Rahman Alhadad @ Altimet	26,298	57.27	▼2.33
PN	Sharifah Haslizah Syed Ariffin	19,620	42.73	▲42.73
Total valid votes		45,918	100.00	
Total rejected ballots		184		
Unreturned ballots		39		
Turnout		46,141	70.28	▼14.07
Registered electors		65,650		
Majority		6,678	14.54	▼24.61
PH hold		Swing		

Selangor state election, 2018
Party	Candidate	Votes	%	∆%
PKR	Haniza Mohamed Talha	22,512	59.60	▲59.60
BN	Muhamad Nizam Shith	7,722	20.45	▼19.09
PAS	Khasim Abdul Aziz	7,358	19.48	▼40.98
Parti Rakyat Malaysia	Norizwan Mohamed	177	0.47	▲0.47
Total valid votes		37,769	100.00	
Total rejected ballots		359		
Unreturned ballots		0		
Turnout		38,128	84.35	▲9.71
Registered electors		45,200		
Majority		14,790	39.15	▲18.23
PKR gain from PAS		Swing		?

Selangor state election, 2013
Party	Candidate	Votes	%	∆%
PAS	Khasim Abdul Aziz	25,185	60.46	▲6.50
BN	Baderisham Jolly	16,472	39.54	▼6.50
Total valid votes		41,657	100.00	
Total rejected ballots		469		
Unreturned ballots		95		
Turnout		42,221	86.75	▲12.11
Registered electors		48,668		
Majority		8,713	20.92	▲13.00
PAS hold		Swing		
Source(s) "Federal Government Gazette - Notice of Contested Election, State Legislative Assembly for the State of Selangor [P.U. (B) 192/2013]" (PDF). Attorney General's Chambers of Malaysia. 26 April 2013. Archived from the original (PDF) on 2019-12-29. "Federal Government Gazette - Results of Contested Election and Statements of the Poll after the Official Addition of Votes, State Constituencies for the State of Selangor [P.U. (B) 233/2013]". Attorney General's Chambers of Malaysia. 22 May 2013. Archived from the original (PDF) on 2018-10-02.

Selangor state election, 2008
Party	Candidate	Votes	%	∆%
PAS	Khasim Abdul Aziz	15,182	53.96	▲22.67
BN	Ismail Kijo	12,954	46.04	▼22.67
Total valid votes		28,136	100.00	
Total rejected ballots		503		
Unreturned ballots		58		
Turnout		28,697	74.64	▲4.15
Registered electors		38,445		
Majority		2,228	7.92	▼29.50
PAS gain from BN		Swing		?

Selangor state election, 2004
Party	Candidate	Votes	%	∆%
BN	Ismail Kijo	17,092	68.71	▲14.42
PAS	Wan Hasrina Wan Hassan	7,785	31.29	▼14.42
Total valid votes		24,877	100.00	
Total rejected ballots		336		
Unreturned ballots		17		
Turnout		25,230	70.49	▼7.17
Registered electors		35,794		
Majority		9,307	37.42	▲28.84
BN hold		Swing		

Selangor state election, 1999
Party	Candidate	Votes	%	∆%
BN	Ismail Kijo	14,267	54.29	▼27.48
PAS	Iskandar Abdul Samad	12,013	45.71	▲27.48
Total valid votes		26,280	100.00	
Total rejected ballots		490		
Unreturned ballots		22		
Turnout		26,792	77.66	▲3.81
Registered electors		34,497		
Majority		2,254	8.58	▼54.96
BN hold		Swing		

Selangor state election, 1995
Party	Candidate	Votes	%
BN	Ismail Kijo	17,262	81.77
PAS	Sarom Jais	3,849	18.23
Total valid votes		21,111	100.00
Total rejected ballots		493	
Unreturned ballots		258	
Turnout		21,862	73.85
Registered electors		29,603	
Majority		13,413	63.54
This was a new constituency created.
