= Terrence Siambun =

Malaysian politician (born 1974)

Yang Berhormat Terrence Siambun MLA

Member of the Sabah State Legislative Assembly for Moyog
- In office 10 April 2013 – 6 April 2018
- Preceded by: Donald Peter Mojuntin (BN–UPKO)
- Succeeded by: Jennifer Lasimbang (WARISAN)
- Majority: 1,682 (2013)

Personal details
- Born: Terrence Alon Siambun; 1 October 1974 (age 51) Penampang, Sabah, Malaysia
- Party: PKR (2013–2016); WARISAN (2016–present)
- Other political affiliations: Pakatan Harapan (–2016)
- Occupation: Politician

Terrence Alon Siambun is a Malaysian politician from Sabah. He served one term as the Member of the Sabah State Legislative Assembly (MLA) for Moyog from 2013 to 2018 under the People's Justice Party (PKR). He is presently the vice-president of the Heritage Party (WARISAN) and has been active in Sabah state politics for over a decade. In 2025, he was WARISAN's candidate for Moyog in the 17th Sabah state election, losing to Donald Peter Mojuntin of UPKO.

== Early life ==
Terrence Siambun was born on 1 October 1974 in Penampang, Sabah. He is of Kadazan-Dusun descent and was active in local community affairs prior to entering electoral politics.

== Political career ==
=== Member of the Sabah State Legislative Assembly ===
Terrence began his political career as a local organiser and community leader in Penampang. He entered state-level politics as a member of the People's Justice Party (PKR) when he contested and won the Moyog state seat at the 2013 state election, defeating the Barisan Nasional candidate with a majority of approximately 1,682 votes. He served as the MLA for Moyog from 2013 until 2018.

During his term, Terrence was involved in local development matters and constituency outreach, raising issues concerning allocations and development for Moyog in the state assembly and local media.

=== Party switch to WARISAN ===
Following the establishment of the Sabah Heritage Party (WARISAN), Terrence was among several Sabah politicians who left PKR for the party, including the MP for Penampang Darell Leiking. He became affiliated with the party around the time the party was being established and subsequently became a senior figure in the party’s state leadership structure. He is presently serving as vice-president of WARISAN.

=== Public statements and disputes ===
In October 2025, Terrence featured in several public exchanges with political rivals over the Sabah mining license scandal concerning alleged cash-for-votes recordings by several Sabah politicians. WARISAN, with Terrence among its spokespeople, called for investigations after several videos went viral alleging corruption against the ruling Gabungan Rakyat Sabah (GRS) coalition. The accused parties publicly rejected Terrence's claims and labelled them as politically motivated.

=== 2025 Sabah state election ===
In the lead-up to the 17th Sabah state election, WARISAN nominated Terrence as its candidate for Moyog, replacing incumbent Darell Leiking in a seat he had previously held.

On polling day, Moyog was among the highly contested constituencies, featuring 12 candidates and two former incumbents. Terrence lost to Donald Peter Mojuntin of the United Progressive Kinabalu Organisation (UPKO) who previously served as a preceding MLA for Moyog from 2008–2013.

== Political positions ==
Terrence has publicly advocated for accountability in state politics and for the protection of local interests in Penampang and Moyog. As a WARISAN leader, he campaigned on a platform emphasising local development, governance transparency and defending native customary rights where relevant to his constituency. His public profile emphasises Sabahan identity and local issues.

== Election results ==
Sabah State Legislative Assembly
| Year | Constituency | Candidate | Votes | Pct | Opponent(s) | Votes | Pct | Ballots cast | Majority | Turnout |
|---|---|---|---|---|---|---|---|---|---|---|
| 2013 | N20 Moyog | Terrence Siambun (PKR) | 7,462 | 50.25% | Philip Benedict Lasimbang (BN–UPKO) | 5,780 | 38.92% | 14,850 | 1,682 | 84.60% |
| 2013 | N20 Moyog | Terrence Siambun (PKR) | 7,462 | 50.25% | Danim @ Aloysius Siap (SAPP) | 779 | 5.25% | 14,850 | 1,682 | 84.60% |
| 2013 | N20 Moyog | Terrence Siambun (PKR) | 7,462 | 50.25% | Bernard Lawrence Solibun (STAR) | 603 | 4.06% | 14,850 | 1,682 | 84.60% |
| 2025 | N26 Moyog | Terrence Siambun (WARISAN) | 6,490 | 30.66% | Donald Peter Mojuntin (UPKO) | 9,108 | 43.03% | 21,166 | 2,618 | 68.09% |
| 2025 | N26 Moyog | Terrence Siambun (WARISAN) | 6,490 | 30.66% | Joe Suleiman (STAR) | 1,805 | 8.53% | 21,166 | 2,618 | 68.09% |
| 2025 | N26 Moyog | Terrence Siambun (WARISAN) | 6,490 | 30.66% | Joeynodd Bansin (PBS) | 1,620 | 7.65% | 21,166 | 2,618 | 68.09% |
| 2025 | N26 Moyog | Terrence Siambun (WARISAN) | 6,490 | 30.66% | Remysta Jimmy Taylor (PKR) | 946 | 4.47% | 21,166 | 2,618 | 68.09% |
| 2025 | N26 Moyog | Terrence Siambun (WARISAN) | 6,490 | 30.66% | Mckery Victor (KDM) | 669 | 3.16% | 21,166 | 2,618 | 68.09% |
| 2025 | N26 Moyog | Terrence Siambun (WARISAN) | 6,490 | 30.66% | Francis Mojikon (BERSATU) | 160 | 0.76% | 21,166 | 2,618 | 68.09% |
| 2025 | N26 Moyog | Terrence Siambun (WARISAN) | 6,490 | 30.66% | Ricky Chang (IND) | 110 | 0.52% | 21,166 | 2,618 | 68.09% |
| 2025 | N26 Moyog | Terrence Siambun (WARISAN) | 6,490 | 30.66% | Richard Ronald Dompok (PKS) | 84 | 0.40% | 21,166 | 2,618 | 68.09% |
| 2025 | N26 Moyog | Terrence Siambun (WARISAN) | 6,490 | 30.66% | Peter Mauruce Lidadun (IND) | 76 | 0.36% | 21,166 | 2,618 | 68.09% |
| 2025 | N26 Moyog | Terrence Siambun (WARISAN) | 6,490 | 30.66% | Cleftus Stephene Spine (IMPIAN) | 68 | 0.32% | 21,166 | 2,618 | 68.09% |
| 2025 | N26 Moyog | Terrence Siambun (WARISAN) | 6,490 | 30.66% | Walter Norbert Johnny (PBK) | 30 | 0.14% | 21,166 | 2,618 | 68.09% |
