= Penampang District =

District in Sabah, Malaysia

- District of Malaysia
- Daerah Penampang

Other transcription(s)
  - Jawi: داءيره ڤنمڤڠ
  - Chinese: 兵南邦县; Bīngnánbāng xiàn (Hanyu Pinyin)
  - Tamil: பெனாம்பாங் மாவட்டம் Peṉāmpāṅ māvaṭṭam (Transliteration)
  - Kadazandusun: Uvang/Watas Penampang
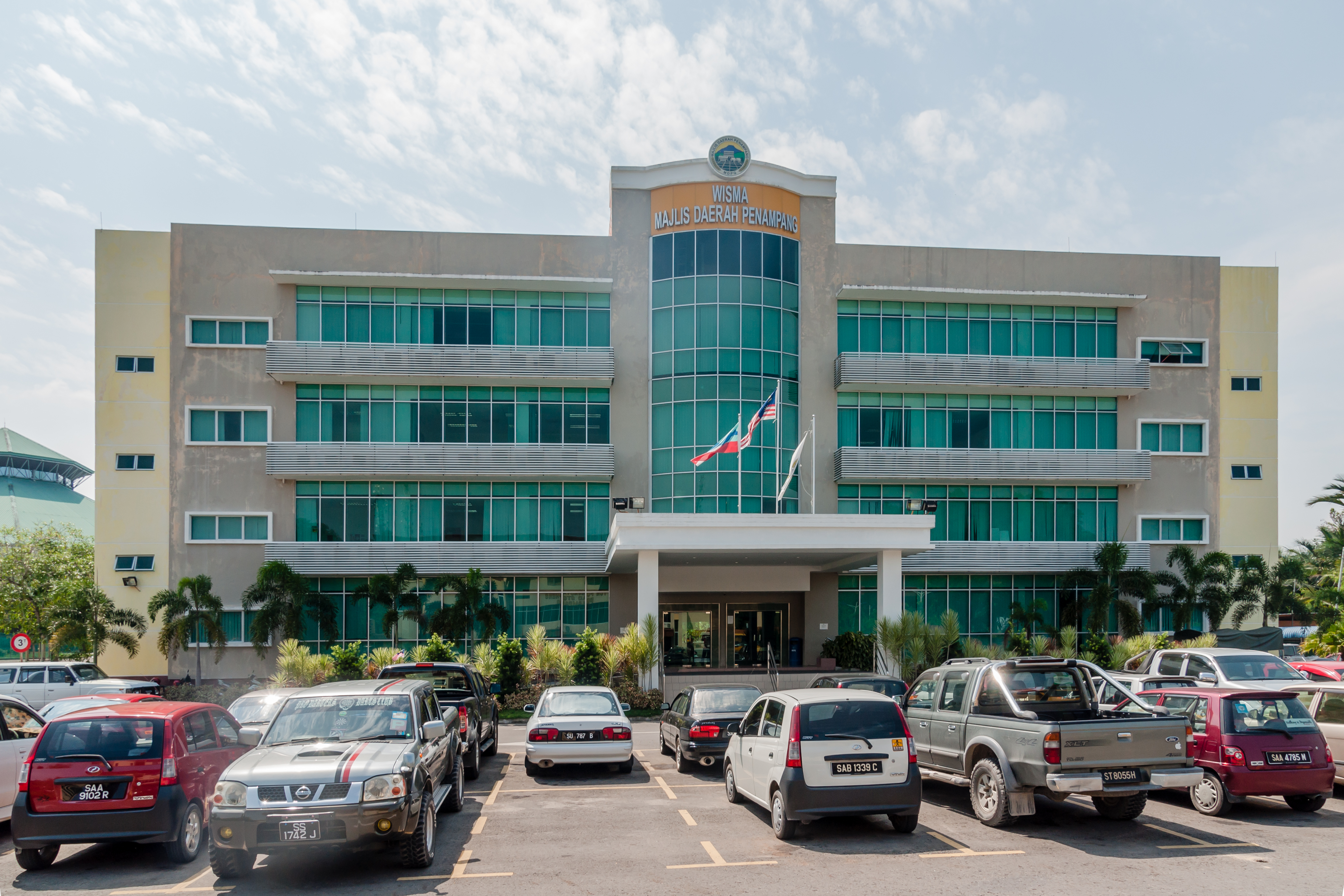
- Penampang Municipal Council office.

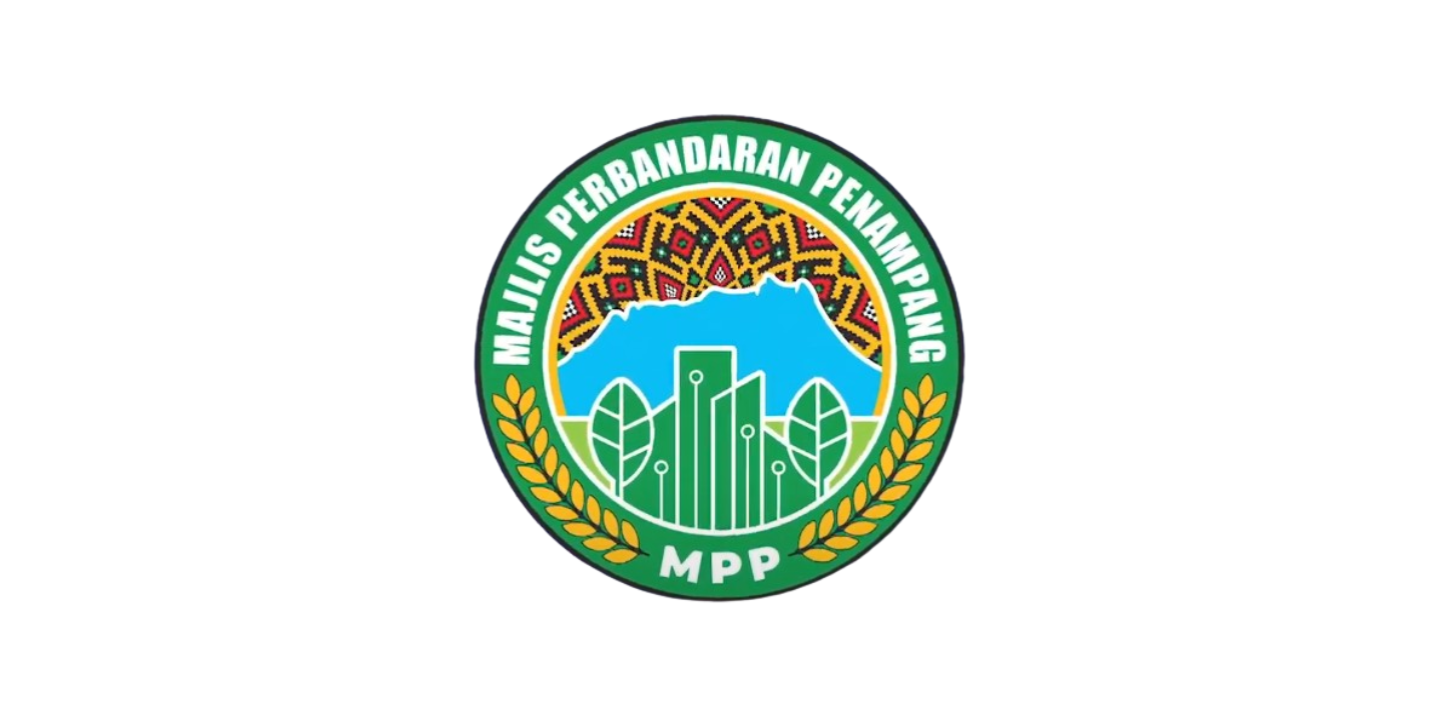
- Flag
- Etymology: pampang, a Kadazan language word which means "big rock"
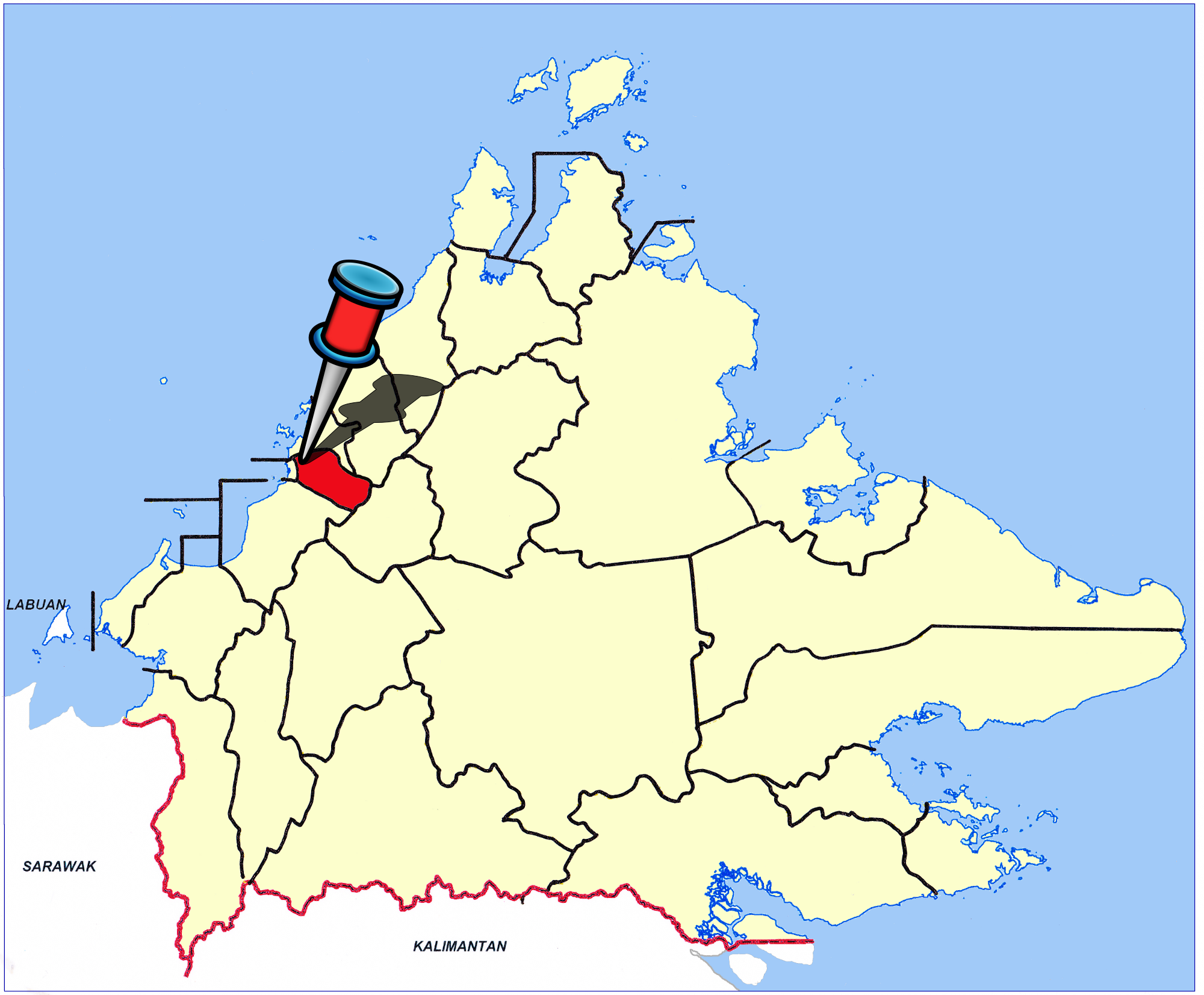
- Location of Penampang District in Sabah
- Interactive map of Penampang District
- Location of Penampang District in Malaysia
- Coordinates: 5°55′00″N 116°07′00″E
- Country: Malaysia
- State: Sabah
- Division: West Coast
- Granted Municipal Status: 1 April 2024
- Seat: Donggongon
- Local area government(s): Penampang Municipal Council

Government
  - District officer: Francis Chong

Area
  - Total: 467 km^{2} (180 sq mi)

Population (2020)
  - Total: 162,174
  - Density: 347/km^{2} (899/sq mi)
- Time zone: UTC+8 (MST)
  - Summer (DST): UTC+8 (Not observed)
- Postcode: 88XXX
- Calling code: +60-88
- Vehicle registration plates: SA (1980-2018); SY (2018-2023); SJ (2023-)
- Website: mppenampang.sbh.gov.my pdpenampang.sbh.gov.my

Map of Penampang District

The Penampang District (Malay: Daerah Penampang) is an administrative district in the Malaysian state of Sabah, part of the West Coast Division which includes the districts of Kota Belud, Kota Kinabalu, Papar, Penampang, Putatan, Ranau and Tuaran. The capital of the district is in Penampang Town.

== History ==
Prior to the formation of Penampang District Council (PDC) in 1978, it was formerly known as Jesselton Rural District Council (JRDC). This auxiliary administrative body covered the whole of Penampang sub-district (including Putatan and Lok Kawi), Telipok town including areas up to Kampung Likas, Taman Foh Sang and Taman Stephen. The first head of JRDC was the District Officer of Jesselton, Mr. Blow D.S.O while the Chief Executive was the Assistant District Officer. The councillors comprising the district Chiefs namely: OKK Laiman Diki bin Siram, Majimbun Majangkim, Tan Pin Hing, Ewan Empok and Ahsai Ghani; Chinese Kapitan: Foo Ah Kau (Penampang), Wong Nam Fatt (Telipok), Chin Nyuk (Menggatal), Chin Tsun Yin (Inanam) and Ng Swee Hock (Putatan); Property Owners: Mr. W. C. Collard (Lok Kawi Estate) and Julius Makajil (Penampang). In 1966, the Local Government Ordinance 1961 was amended whereby Councilors are to be appointed by the Minister of Local Government Sabah. When the name Jesselton was changed to Kota Kinabalu, Jesselton Rural District Council (JRDC) was also changed to Kota Kinabalu Rural District Council (KKRDC). In 1978, Kota Kinabalu Town Board was upgraded to Kota Kinabalu Municipal Council hence Kota Kinabalu Rural District Council (KKRDC) became Penampang District Council (PDC).

== Demographics ==
Historical population
| Year | Pop. | ±% |
|---|---|---|
| 1991 | 86,941 | — |
| 2000 | 131,072 | +50.8% |
| 2010 | 121,934 | −7.0% |
| 2020 | 162,174 | +33.0% |

According to the last census in 2020, the population of the district is estimated to be around 162,174 inhabitants, with the majority of the population belong to the Kadazan-Dusun ethnic groups and the Chinese. These followed by a minority of Bajau and Bruneian Malay. The Kadazan-Dusuns mainly practice Christianity, the majority of which are Roman Catholic. The Chinese (including of Sino-Native backgrounds) mainly practice Buddhism or Christianity. Malays (mostly of Bruneian descent) and Bajaus are Muslims (they domiciled in the sub-district of Putatan and its surrounding town of Petagas). Penampang was one of the important sites for Roman Catholic early mission in North Borneo. St. Joseph's Foreign Mission Society of Mill Hill, a Roman Catholic mission organisation, began its early missionary works in Papar, Penampang and Sandakan in early 1880s. In 1927, Penampang became the centre of missionary activities in North Borneo and Labuan when Mgr. A. Wachter was appointed the Prefect Apostolic and subsequently made the Penampang mission as his headquarter. The mission work was undoubtedly an important catalyst not only in religion dissemination among the native population of Penampang but also in providing education. The population is divided among the larger communities and the total area of the district as follows:

| Penampang (federal constituency) | 178,499 inhabitants |
|---|---|
| N.25 Kapayan | 118,966 |
| N.26 Moyog | 59,533 |

== Geography ==
Penampang located within the western region of Sabah. The district has no coastline (though historically have), and was completely bounded by certain district – Kota Kinabalu to the north, Putatan to the west, Papar to the southwest, Tambunan to the southeast, and Tuaran to the northeast. The districts topography is consisting of lowland areas within urban area, whereas inland area consists of highlands, characterized by undulating, hilly as well as mountainous, which are bounded by the Crocker Range. The longest river in the district is Moyog River, with tributaries include the Babagon River and Kibunut River.

== Economy ==
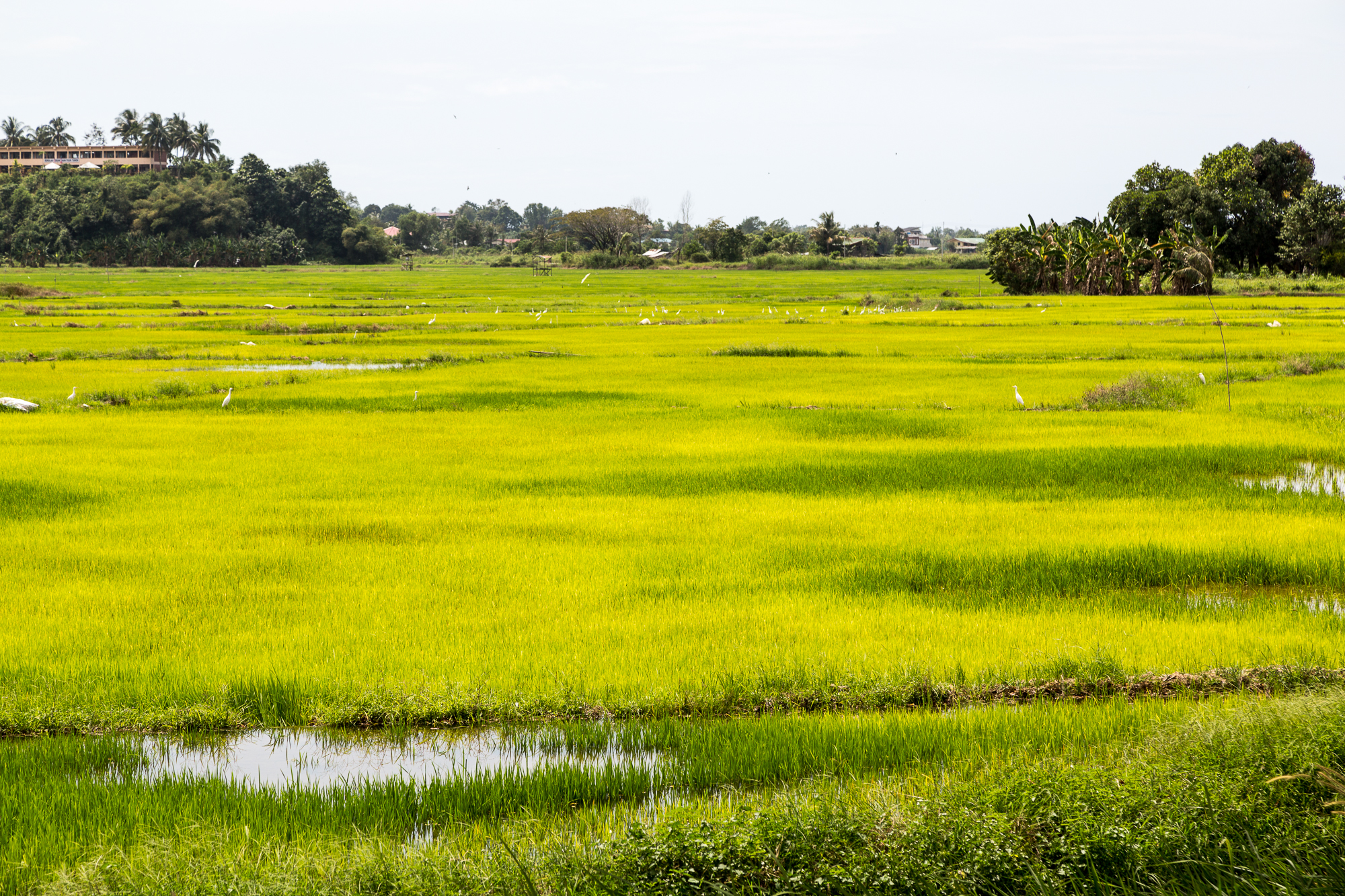
Kodundungan plain.

Historically, the main economic activity in Penampang has been the cultivation of wet rice and other agricultural-based economies. In recent years, due to rapid economic boom and its close proximity to Kota Kinabalu, Penampang observes a rapid growth in the secondary and tertiary sectors of economy resulting in a major decline in the traditional agricultural activities. Lands traditionally used for cultivation of wet rice are increasingly sold for commercial and industrial purposes despite prohibition by the local authorities.

== Education ==
S.M. St. Michael is situated in Penampang. It is one of the daily public schools in Sabah. In addition to the school above, Penampang district also hosts to other secondary and primary schools such as SMK Datuk Peter Mojuntin, SMK Bahang, SMK Tansau, SMK Putatan, SMK Limbanak, SJK (C) Yue Min, SK St. Theresa Inobong, SJK (C) Hwa Shiong Putatan, SK Kibabaig, SK St. Joseph, SK Kem Lok Kawi Putatan, SK Penampang, SK St. Anthony Dontozidon, SK Bahang, SK St. Aloysius Limbanak, SK St. Paul Kolopis, SK Putaton Inobong, SK Built Hill, SK Puuntunoh, SK Tansau, SK Petagas, SK Tombovo, SK Pekan Putatan and SK Sugud to name a few. Tunku Abdul Rahman University College has a branch campus in Donggongon town, while SIDMA College in Bundusan area within the township of Penampang Baru (Bandar Baru Penampang, Koidupan) and INTI College Kota Kinabalu Campus is located in Putatan town.

== Tourism ==
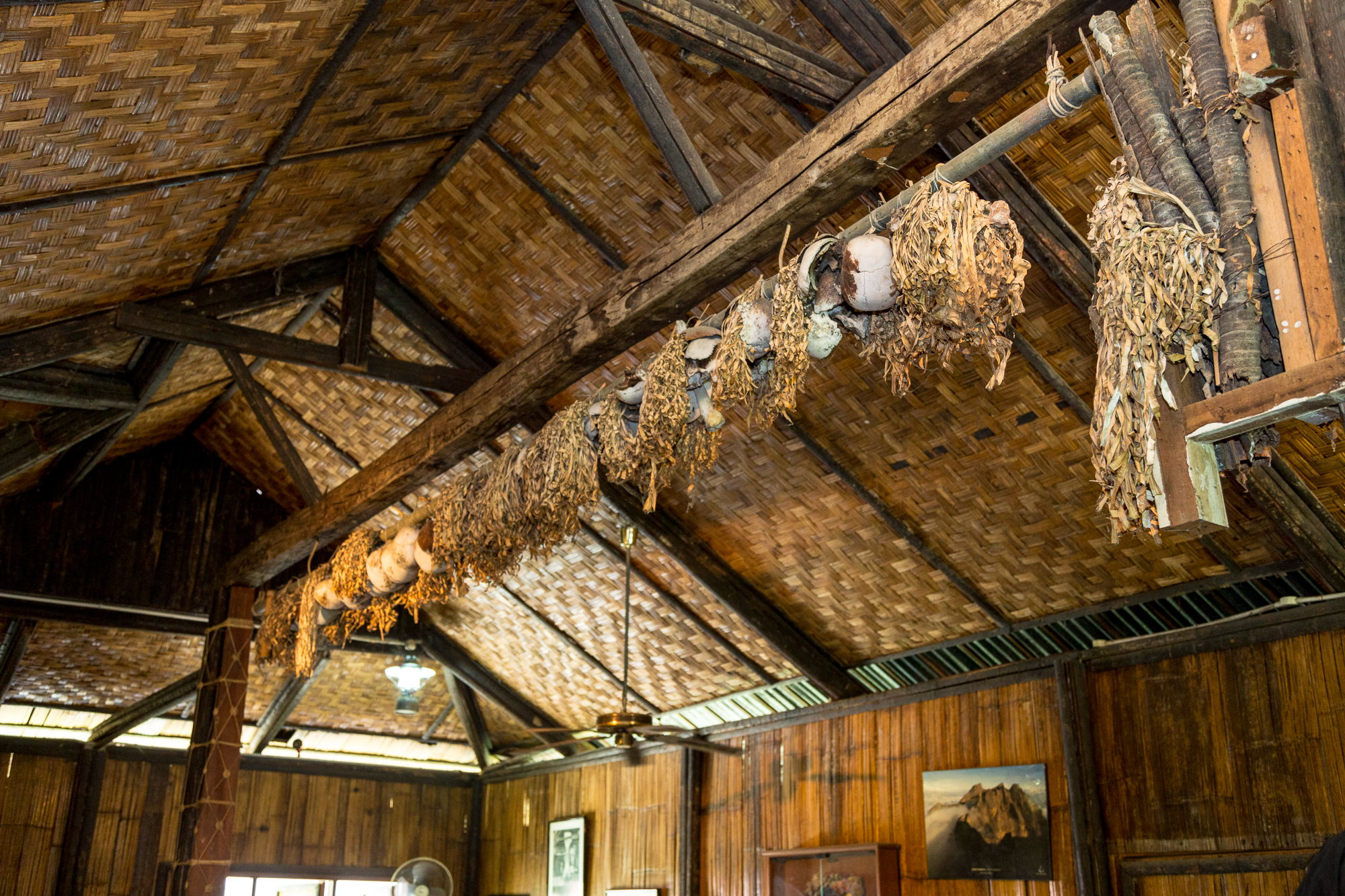
House of skulls in Monsopiad Cultural village, Penampang.

Penampang is generally considered as a stronghold of the Kadazan-Dusun community and serves as a main centre for their political and cultural development. The Kadazan-Dusun Cultural Association (KDCA) community hall hosts many of Kadazan-Dusun's traditional festivities, chief among them is the annual Kaamatan or 'harvest festival', their most important cultural event. The Monsopiad Cultural Village is in Penampang. Monsopiad was the name of a past warrior who was known for decapitating the heads of his enemy and hanging the skulls at the entrance of his home, to warn his enemies of his powers. The Pogunon Community Museum, a part of Sabah museum institution is situated in Kg. Pogunon, Penampang. In 2000, during a construction of a local kindergarten, three jars and pieces from four jars were discovered including an intact jar from 16th century with human remains inside. Sabah Art Gallery is situated in Penampang. It houses over 3000 paintings, carvings, and sculptures. The building has a unique basket-shaped architecture with decorative cultural motif panels of the indigenous people of Sabah. It is also the first green building in Sabah and Borneo. St. Michael's Church is a Roman Catholic church built from early 1930s until late 1940s. it is the second oldest stone church in Sabah.

== Friendship district ==
- Meili, Jiangsu, China (since 13 April 2016)

== Gallery ==
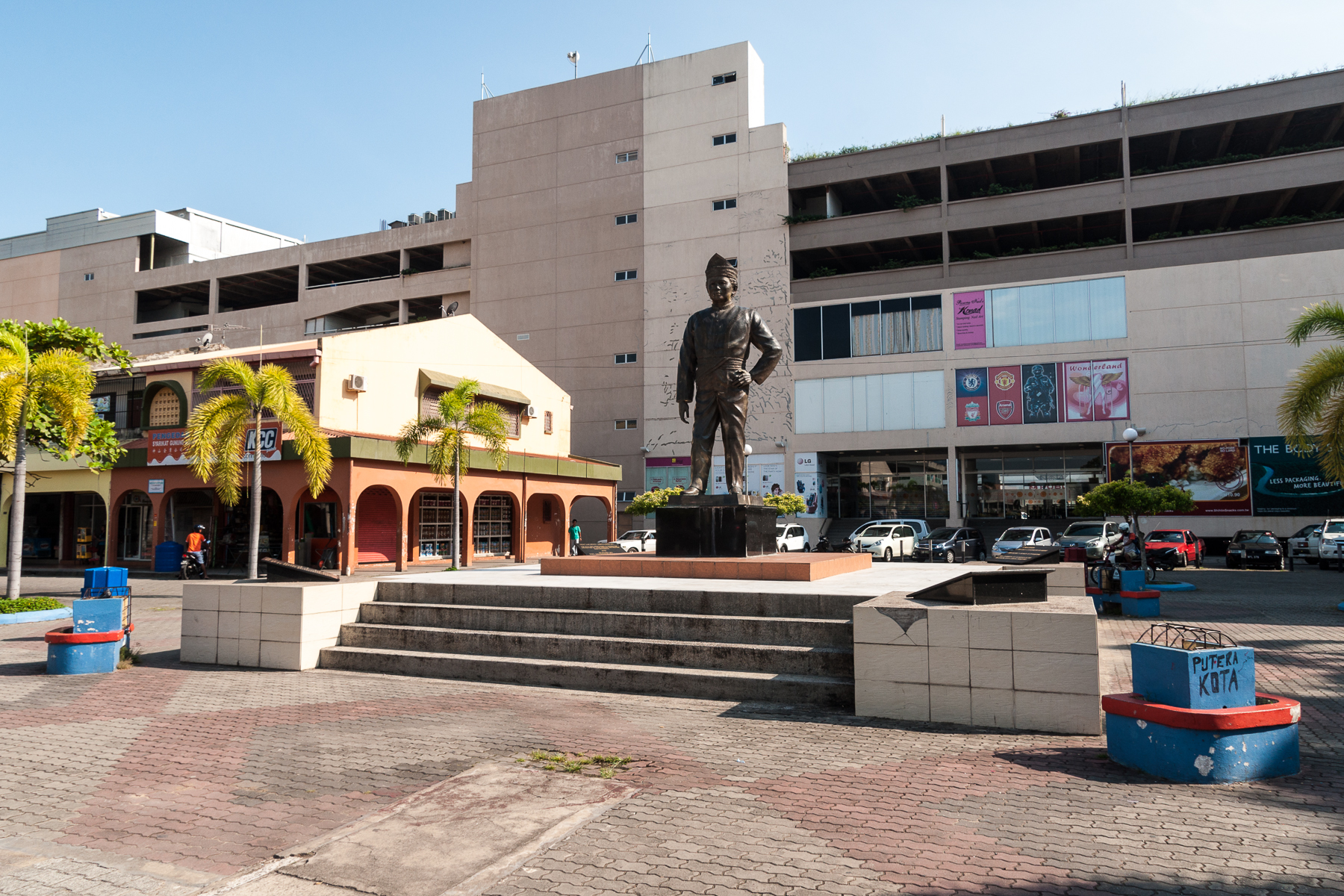
Peter Mojuntin statue.

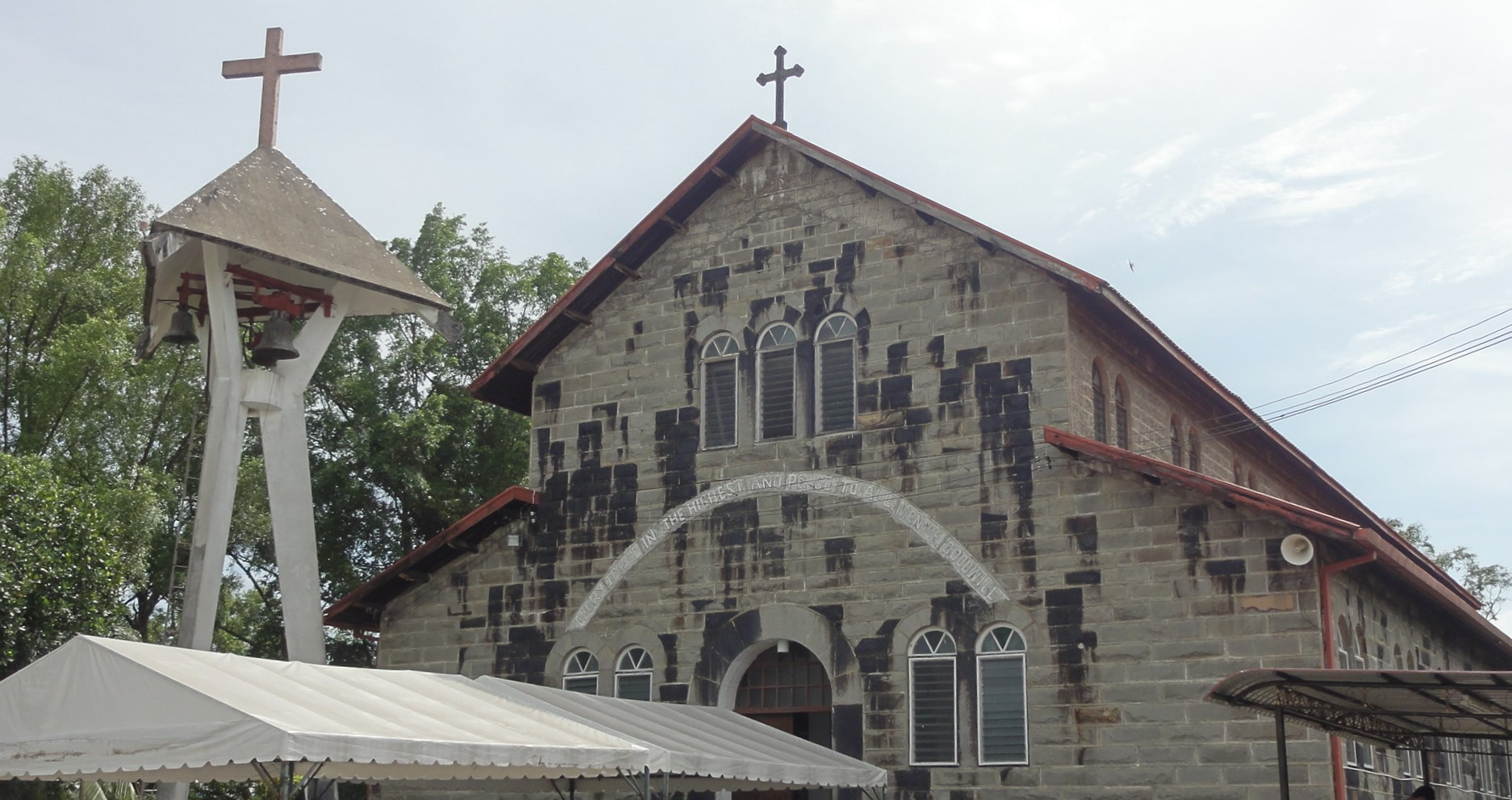
St. Michael's Church.

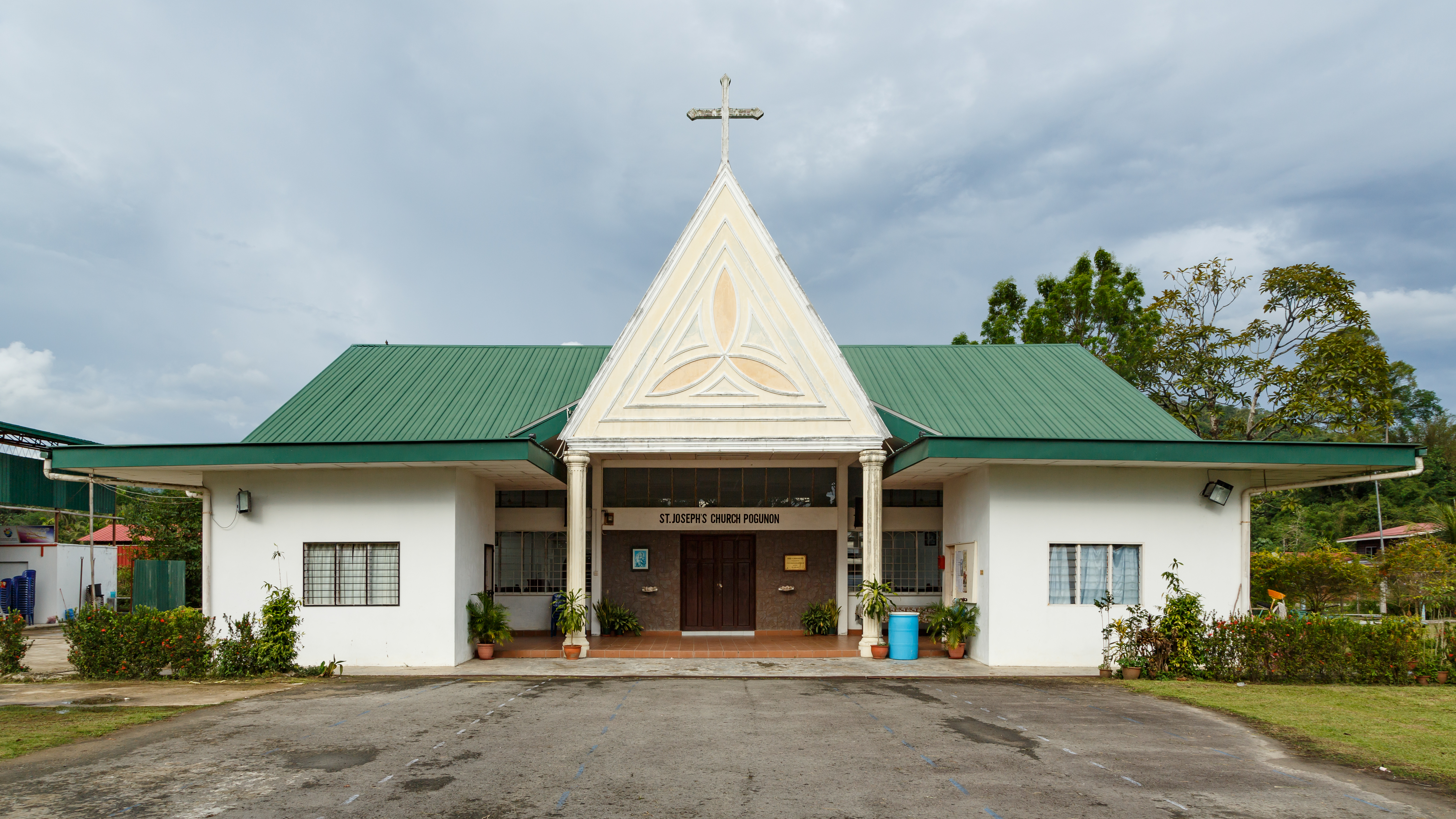
St. Joseph Catholic Church, Pogunon.

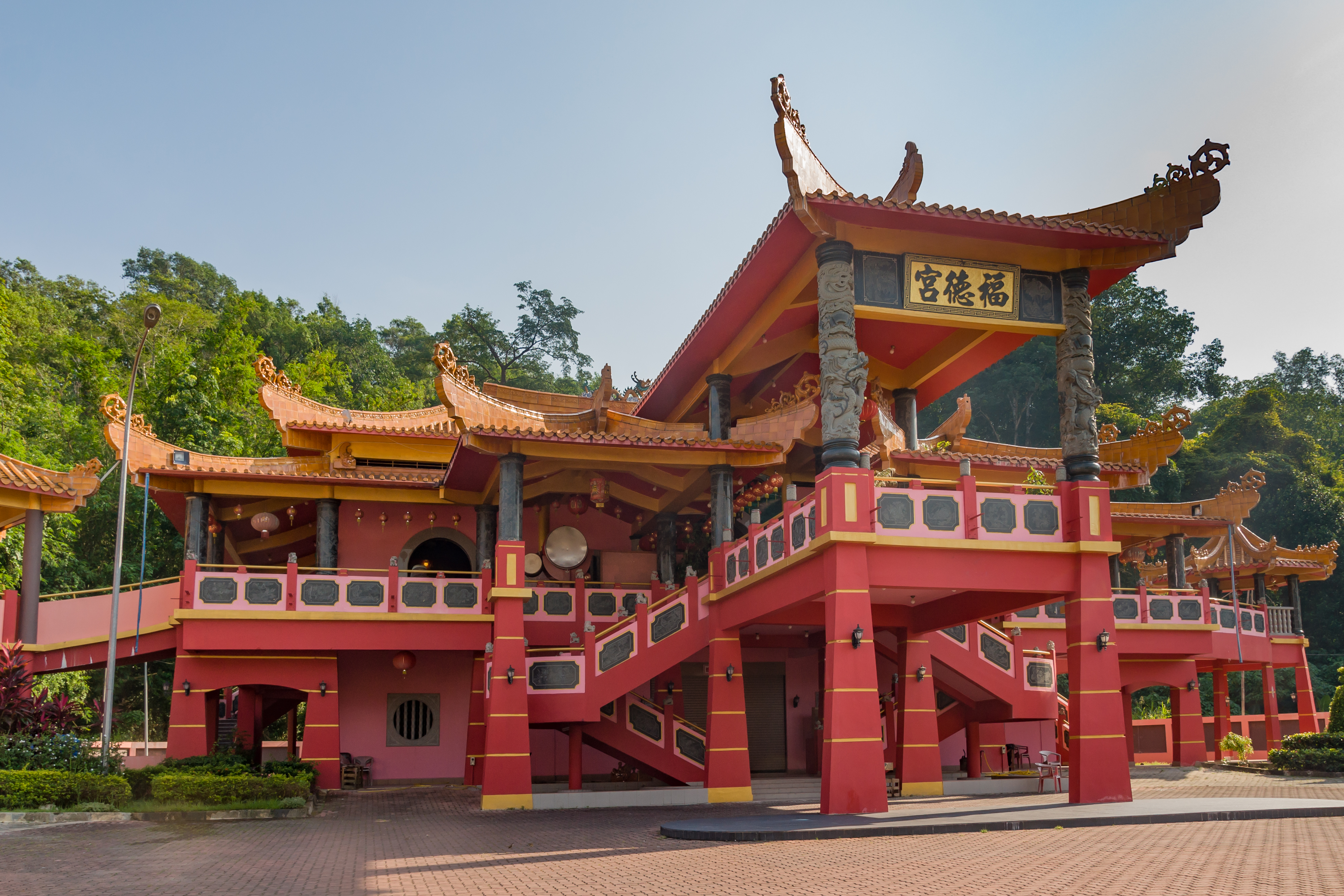
Jing Fu Temple.

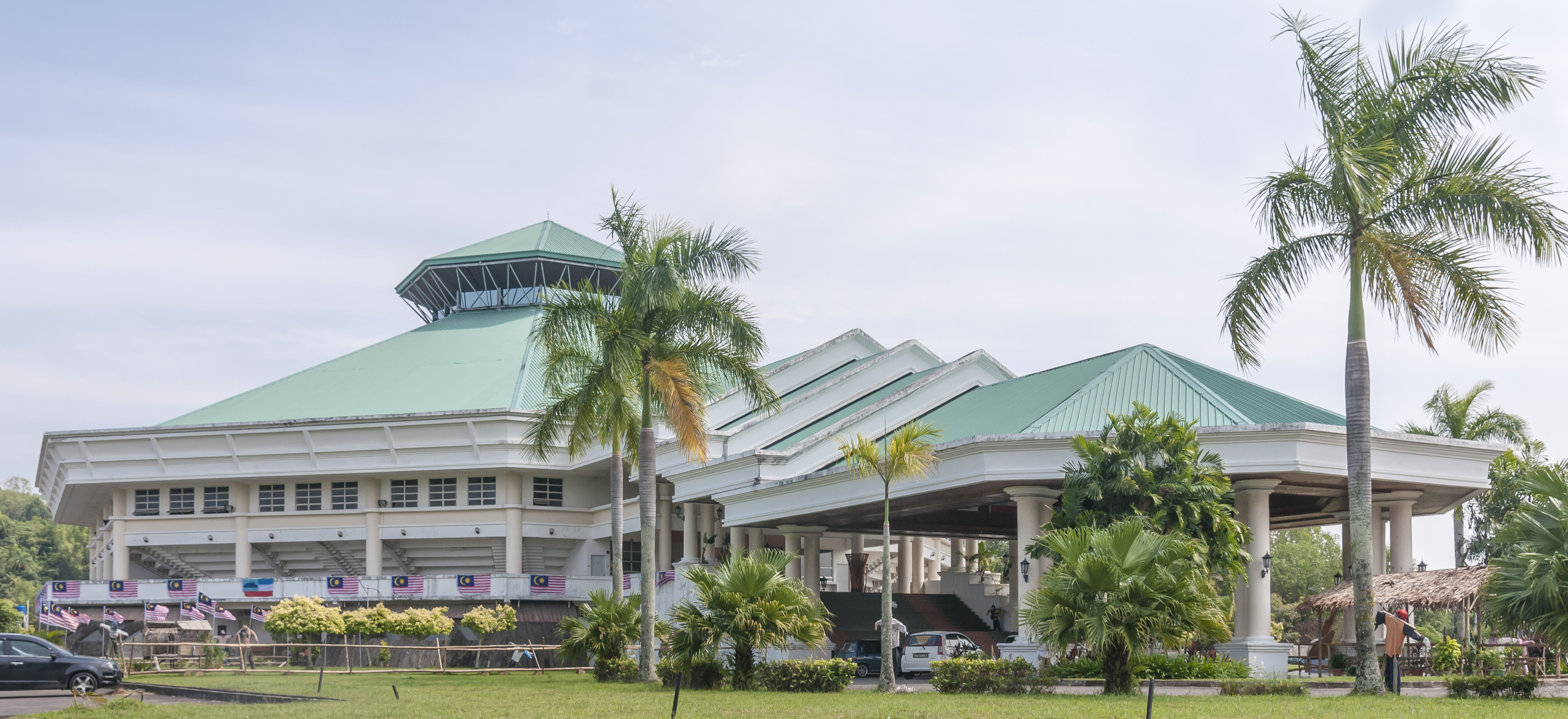
Cultural Hall, Donggongon.

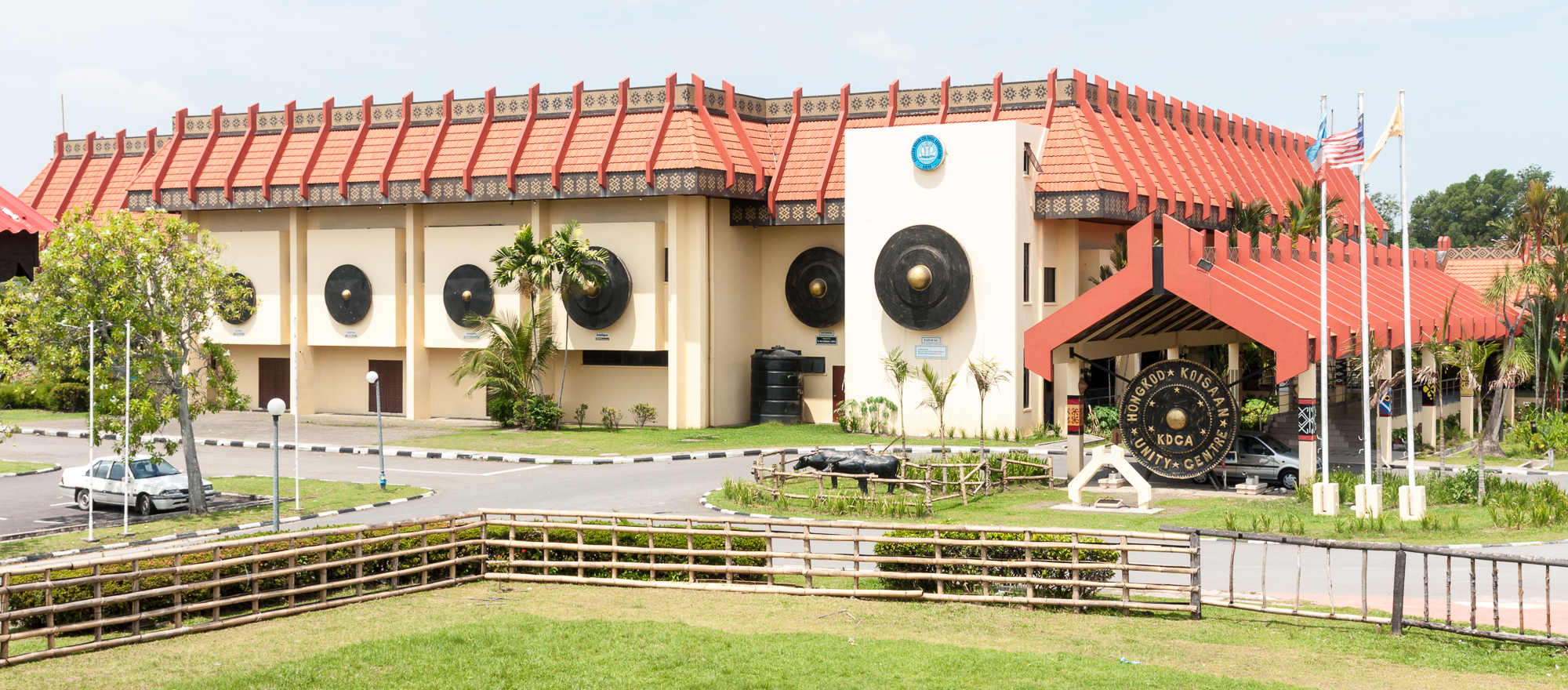
Hongkod Koisaan (Unity Centre) of the Kadazandusun Cultural Association (KDCA).

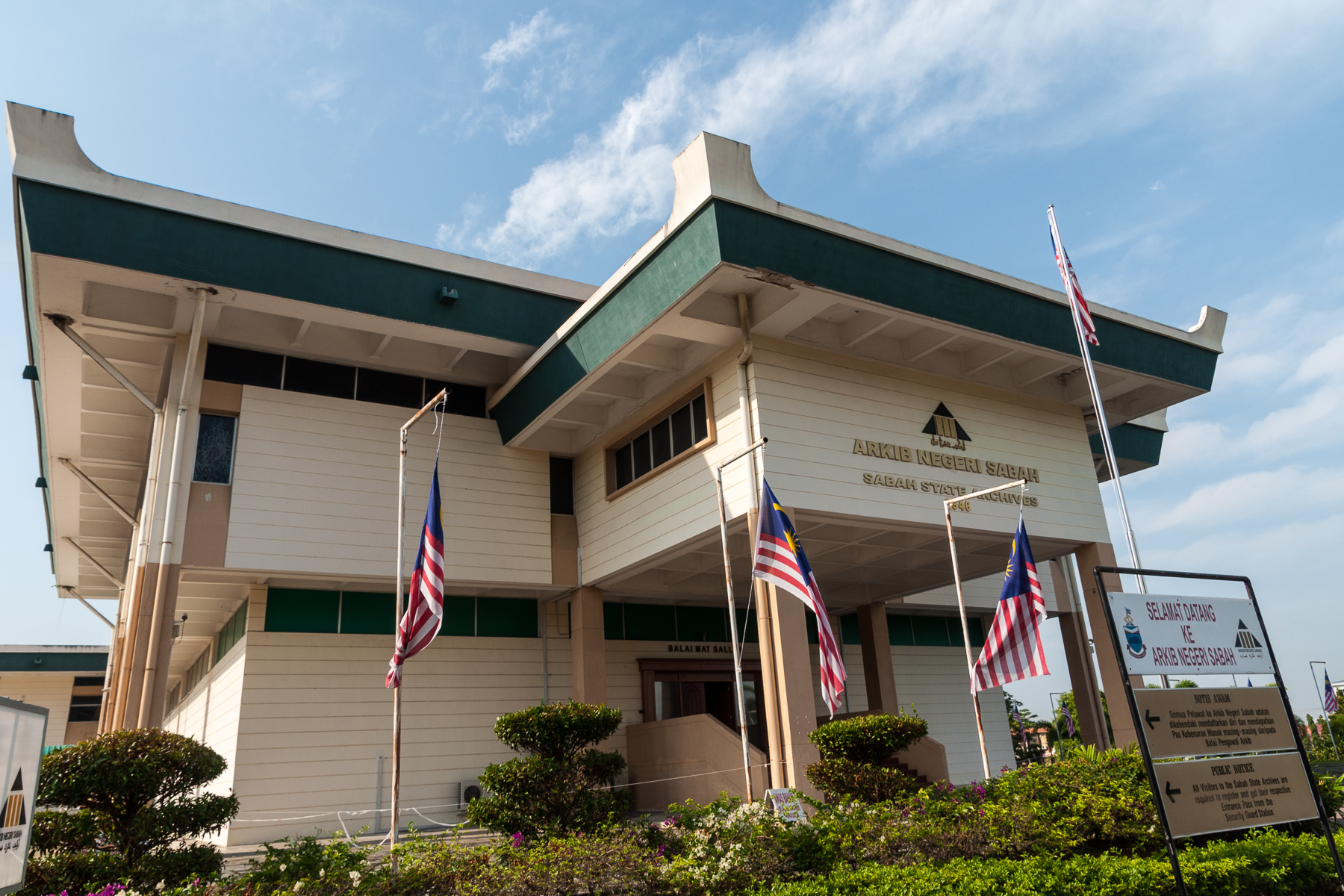
Sabah State Archive building in Penampang.

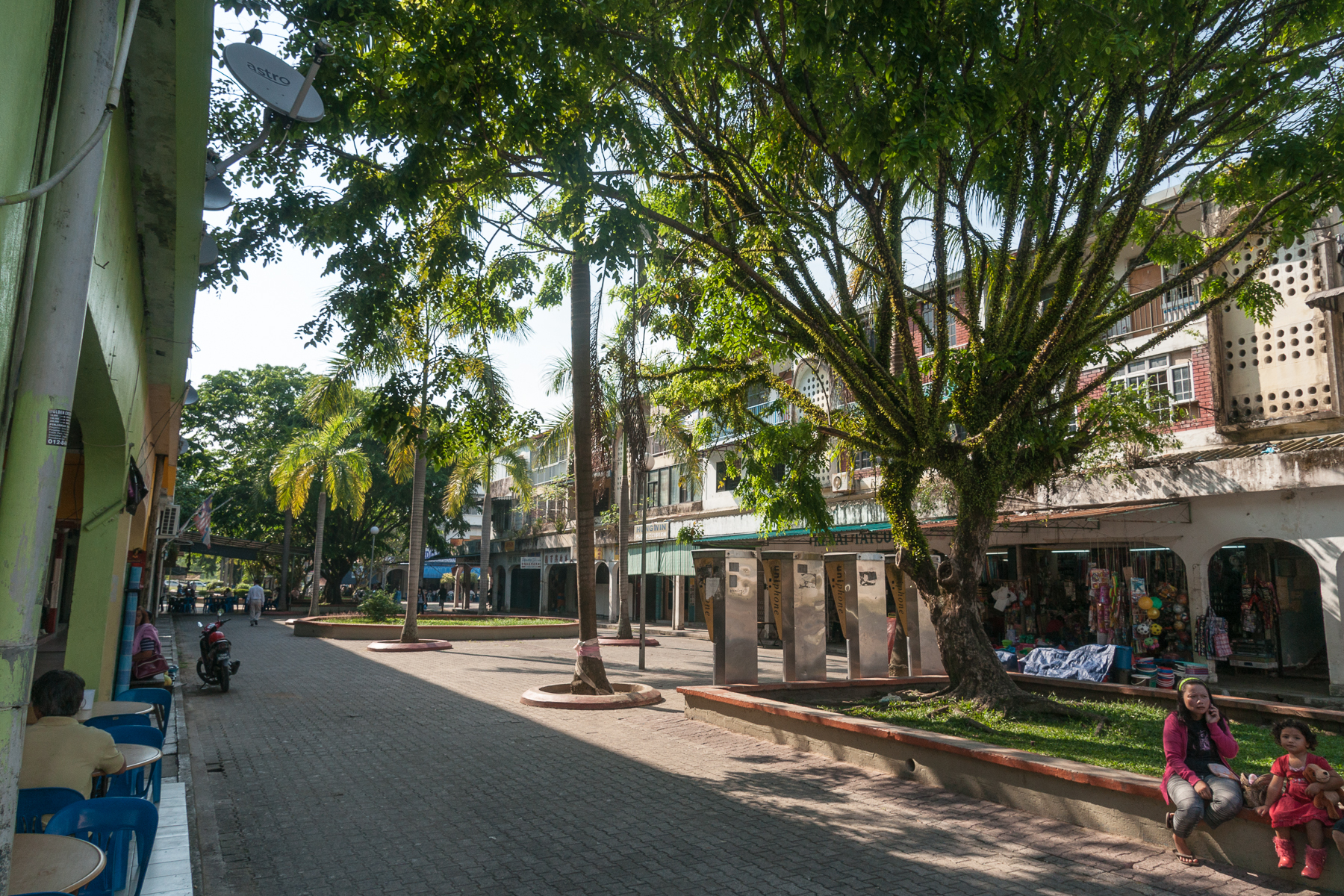
Penampang town centre.

== Notable Persons ==
- Bernard Giluk Dompok - Eleventh Chief Minister of Sabah and former Malaysian cabinet minister.
- Darell Leiking - The former minister of Malaysian Cabinet.
- Donald Peter Mojuntin - The former Malaysian Senator.
- Richard Malanjum - Former Chief Justice of Malaysia from 2018 to 2019.
- Conrad Mojuntin - Former Sabah cabinet minister.
- Ewon Benedick - Current Malaysian cabinet minister cum incumbent member of parliament since 2022 (paternal hometown).
- Jannie Lasimbang - Current state assemblywoman for Kapayan since 2018.
- Peter Mojuntin - Former Sabah cabinet minister.
- Marcus Mojigoh - Surveyor and former member of parliament for Putatan from 2004 to 2018.

== See also ==
- Districts of Malaysia
