= Jennifer Lasimbang =

Malaysian politician

Jennifer Lasimbang ASDK MLA

State Assistant Minister of Education and Innovation of Sabah
- In office 16 May 2018 – 26 September 2020 Serving with Mohammad Mohamarin
- Governor: Juhar Mahiruddin
- Chief Minister: Shafie Apdal
- Minister: Yusof Yacob
- Preceded by: Hamisa Samat (State Assistant Minister of Resources and Information Technology Development of Sabah)
- Succeeded by: Ruddy Awah (State Assistant Minister of Science, Technology and Innovation of Sabah)
- Constituency: Moyog

Member of the Sabah State Legislative Assembly for Moyog
- In office 9 May 2018 – 26 September 2020
- Preceded by: Terrence Siambun (PR–PKR)
- Succeeded by: Darell Leiking (WARISAN)
- Majority: 4,442 (2018)

Personal details
- Born: Jenifer Lasimbang; 29 September 1974 (age 52) Penampang, Sabah, Malaysia
- Citizenship: Malaysian
- Party: Heritage Party (WARISAN)
- Relations: Jannie Lasimbang (sister); Adrian Lasimbang (brother)
- Education: Universiti Utara Malaysia (BSIT); Indiana University (MSc)
- Occupation: Politician

Jenifer Lasimbang, also known as Jennifer Lasimbang, is a Malaysian indigenous rights advocate and former politician who served as the State Assistant Minister of Education and Innovation of Sabah in the Heritage Party (WARISAN) state administration under former chief minister Shafie Apdal and Member of the Sabah State Legislative Assembly (MLA) for Moyog from May 2018 to September 2020. She is a member of WARISAN. She later returned to full-time civil society work and in 2024 became the executive director of the Indigenous Peoples Advocates of Sabah Fund (IPAS Fund).

== Early life and education ==
Jennifer was born in Penampang, Sabah, and is of ethnic Kadazan-Dusun descent. She hails from a political family, being the younger sibling of Jannie Lasimbang, a Democratic Action Party (DAP) politician encompassing as Chairperson of the Rural Development Corporation (KPD) of Sabah and MLA for Kapayan. , and Adrian Lasimbang, a politician from the United Progressive Kinabalu Organisation (UPKO) and former Member of the Dewan Negara. She and her elder sister, Jannie, simultaneously entered the Sabah State Legislative Assembly in 2018, winning the Moyog and Kapayan seats respectively.

She holds a Bachelor's degree in information technology from Universiti Utara Malaysia and a Master of Science in human–computer interaction from Indiana University (US). She has also served as a lecturer of IT and as a negotiator for international agencies such as UNDP and UNICEF.

== Early career ==
Before entering electoral politics, Lasimbang worked in community work and indigenous rights advocacy. According to her professional profile, she served as a consultant to UNICEF Malaysia (2014–2017) and as a consultant with the United Nations Development Programme (UNDP) in Bangkok (2008–2009). She was also involved with Sabah-based indigenous organisations, including PACOS Trust, TONIBUNG (Tobpinai Ningkokoton Koburuon Kampung), and JOAS (Jaringan Orang Asal SeMalaysia).

== Political career ==
=== 2018 state election ===
At the 2018 Sabah state election held concurrently with Malaysia’s 14th general election, Lasimbang won the state seat of Moyog as a candidate of the Heritage Party (WARISAN). During her term, she was appointed Assistant Minister of Education and Innovation of Sabah, working under the then-minister Yusof Yacob. In this capacity, she was quoted in state media on education and schooling initiatives, including science and innovation outreach and school operations matters.

=== Controversies ===
While serving as an assemblywoman and assistant minister, Jennifer appeared in several public issues, including statements regarding the opening of schools to undocumented children and several episodes of heated discussions on social media regarding office management and allegedly leaked messages; The press reported these matters as low-profile issues that received local attention.

=== 2020 state election ===
The Warisan-led administration failed to be re-elected following the September 2020 Sabah state election. Lasimbang did not contest for re-election in Moyog, thus not returning to the assembly thereafter; the Moyog seat was subsequently held by Warisan deputy president Darell Leiking from 2020 onwards.

== Activism and later career ==
After leaving elected office, Lasimbang resumed full-time indigenous rights advocacy. In May 2024, she became the executive director of the Indigenous Peoples Advocates of Sabah Fund (IPAS Fund), focusing on movement-building, legal empowerment and philanthropy for indigenous communities in Sabah. She has also spoken in international forums representing indigenous people on climate, including during COP27, where she addressed just transition and loss-and-damage issues affecting indigenous communities.

In interviews and public statements after 2020, Jennifer stated that she had withdrawn from party politics around 2022 to focus on strengthening Indigenous networks in Malaysia (e.g. Jaringan Orang Asal SeMalaysia, JOAS) as well as Asian/international-level advocacy and funding work.

== Election results ==
Sabah State Legislative Assembly
Year	Constituency	Candidate	Votes	Pct	Opponent(s)	Votes	Pct	Ballots cast	Majority	Turnout
2018	N20 Moyog	Jennifer Lasimbang (WARISAN)	9,745	61.39%	Donald Peter Mojuntin (UPKO)	5,303	33.40%	16,100	4,442	82.80%
2018	N20 Moyog	Jennifer Lasimbang (WARISAN)	9,745	61.39%	Danim Aloysius Siap (STAR)	605	3.81%	16,100	4,442	82.80%
2018	N20 Moyog	Jennifer Lasimbang (WARISAN)	9,745	61.39%	Bandasan Dennis J Tunding (PCS)	222	1.40%	16,100	4,442	82.80%

== Honours ==
- Sabah :
  - Companion of the Order of Kinabalu (ASDK) (2018)
