= Penampang (federal constituency) =

Federal constituency of Sabah, Malaysia

Penampang (P174)
Sabah constituency

Federal constituency
- Legislature: Dewan Rakyat
- MP: Ewon Benedick; GRS
- Constituency created: 1966
- First contested: 1969
- Last contested: 2022

Demographics
- Population (2020): 178,499
- Electors (2025): 80,681
- Area (km²): 492
- Pop. density (per km²): 362.8

Penampang is a federal constituency in West Coast Division (Penampang District and Kota Kinabalu District), Sabah, Malaysia, that has been represented in the Dewan Rakyat since 1971.

The federal constituency was created in the 1966 redistribution and is mandated to return a single member to the Dewan Rakyat under the first past the post voting system.

== Demographics ==
https://ge15.orientaldaily.com.my/seats/sabah/p

Ethnic breakdown of Penampang's electorate as of 2022
1. Sabah Bumiputera (53.8%)
2. Chinese (34.2%)
3. Malay-Muslim Bumiputera (9.30%)
4. Other ethnicities (2.70%)

As of 2020, Penampang has a population of 178,499 people.

Age breakdown of Penampang's electorate as of 2022
1. 18-20 (6.88%)
2. 21-29 (22.1%)
3. 30-39 (23.9%)
4. 40-49 (18.9%)
5. 50-59 (13.3%)
6. 60-69 (9.21%)
7. 70-79 (3.97%)
8. 80-89 (1.33%)
9. above 90 (0.55%)
Gender breakdown of Penampang's electorate as of 2022
1. Male (50.9%)
2. Female (49.1%)

== History ==
=== Polling districts ===
According to the gazette issued on 21 November 2025, the Penampang constituency has a total of 20 polling districts.

State constituency	Polling District	Code	Location
Kapayan (N25)	Kapayan Barat	174/25/01	Institut Latihan Jabatan Kerja Raya Kota Kinabalu
Kapayan (N25)	Kapayan	172/25/02	SK Kepayan; Dewan Raya Kepayan Kampung Kibouvang; Dewan Raya Kampung Ganang; Dewan Jabatan Penjara Malaysia Sabah Kepayan
Kapayan (N25)	Kapayan Timor	174/25/03	SJK (C) Shan Tao; Dewan Serbaguna Taman Sri Kepayan
Kapayan (N25)	Kobusak	174/25/04	SK Bahang; Dewan KDCA Penampang
Kapayan (N25)	Nosoob	174/25/05	SMK Bahang; SK Luyang; SK St. Francis Convent
Kapayan (N25)	Donggongon	174/25/06	SJK (C) Yue Min Puluduk
Kapayan (N25)	Hungab	174/25/07	SK Penampang
Moyog (N26)	Buit	174/26/01	SK Buit Hill
Moyog (N26)	Guunsing	174/26/02	SMK Datuk Peter Mojuntin
Moyog (N26)	Penampang Utara	174/26/03	SMK St. Michael Donggongon; SK Kibabaig
Moyog (N26)	Nambazan	174/26/04	SMK Limbanak
Moyog (N26)	Kuai	174/26/05	Dewan Institut Memandu KMK (Khidmat Memandu Kinabalu Sdn Bhd)
Moyog (N26)	Limbanak	174/26/06	SK St. Aloysius Limbanak; SK Sugud
Moyog (N26)	Terian	174/26/07	SK Terian
Moyog (N26)	Moyog	174/26/08	SK Moyog; SK Tampasak Togudon
Moyog (N26)	Inobong	174/26/09	SK St. Theresa Inobong; SK St. Paul Kolopis; SK Putaton Inobong; SK Kipovo
Moyog (N26)	Tanaki	174/26/10	SK St. Joseph Kambau
Moyog (N26)	Buayan	174/26/11	SK Buayan
Moyog (N26)	Longkogungan	174/26/12	SK Longkokungan
Moyog (N26)	Babagon	174/26/13	SK Babagon

=== Representation history ===
Members of Parliament for Penampang
Parliament	No	Years	Member	Party	Vote Share
Constituency created
		1969-1971	Parliament was suspended		
3rd	P110	1971-1973	James Stephen Tibok	USNO	Uncontested
3rd	P110	1973-1974	James Stephen Tibok	BN (USNO)	Uncontested
4th	P122	1974-1978	James Stephen Tibok	BN (USNO)	Uncontested
5th	P122	1978-1982	Clarence Elong Mansul	BN (BERJAYA)	8,444; 63.48%
6th	P122	1982-1986	Clarence Elong Mansul	BN (BERJAYA)	10,425; 67.20%
7th	P143	1986-1990	Bernard Giluk Dompok	BN (PBS)	6,659; 52.32%
8th	P143	1990-1995	Bernard Giluk Dompok	GR (PBS)	12,654; 77.97%
9th	P152	1995-1999	Paul Nointien	GR (PBS)	14,652; 53.02%
10th	P152	1999-2004	Philip Benedict Lasimbang	BN (UPKO)	15,326; 55.19%
11th	P174	2004-2008	Donald Peter Mojuntin	BN (UPKO)	16,032; 75.44%
12th	P174	2008-2013	Bernard Giluk Dompok	BN (UPKO)	13,400; 53.95%
13th	P174	2013-2015	Ignatius Darell Leiking	PR (PKR)	22,598; 62.60%
13th	P174	2015–2016	Ignatius Darell Leiking	PH (PKR)	22,598; 62.60%
13th	P174	2016-2018	Ignatius Darell Leiking	WARISAN	22,598; 62.60%
14th	P174	2018-2022	Ignatius Darell Leiking	WARISAN	32,470; 75.32%
15th	P174	2022–2025	Ewon Benedick	PH (UPKO)	29,066; 57.30%
15th	P174	2025–2026	Ewon Benedick	UPKO	29,066; 57.30%
15th	P174	2026–present	Ewon Benedick	GRS (UPKO)	29,066; 57.30%

=== State constituency ===
Parliamentary constituency	State constituency					
Parliamentary constituency	1967–1974	1974–1985	1985–1995	1995–2004	2004–2020	2020–present
Penampang		Inanam				
Penampang					Kapayan	
Penampang		Kawang				
Penampang	Moyog					
Penampang	Papar					
Penampang				Petagas		

=== Historical boundaries ===
State Constituency	Area					
State Constituency	1966	1974	1984	1994	2003	2019
Inanam		Bundusan; Inanam; Kiansom; Menggatal; Sepanggar				
Kapayan					Bundusan; Kampung Nossob Baru; Kepayan; Lido; Taman Kobusak Jaya	Bundusan; Donggongon; Kepayan; Lido; Kampung Nosoob Baru
Kawang		Kampung Dambai; Kawang; Kinarut; Lok Kawi; Pengalat				
Moyog	Donggongon; Inanam; Moyog; Putatan; Sepanggar	Donggongon; Moyog; Putatan; Petagas; Sugud		Babagon; Duvanson; Moyog; Penampang; Sugud		Babagon; Moyog; Minintod; Penampang; Sugud
Papar	Kampung Dambai; Kawang; Kinarut; Lok Kawi; Pengalat					
Petagas				Bataras; Kampung Tombovo; Ketiau; Putatan; Tanjung Dumpil		

=== Current state assembly members ===
No.	State Constituency	Member	Coalition (Party)
N25	Kapayan	Chin Tek Ming	WARISAN
N26	Moyog	Donald Peter Mojuntin	GRS (UPKO)

=== Local governments and postcodes ===
No.	State Constituency	Local Government	Postcode
N25	Kapayan	Kota Kinabalu City Hall (Lido and Kepayan areas); Penampang Municipal Council	88200, 88300, 88460 Kota Kinabalu; 89507 Penampang; 89500 Penampang
N26	Moyog	Penampang Municipal Council	88200, 88300, 88460 Kota Kinabalu; 89507 Penampang; 89500 Penampang

== Election results ==
Malaysian general election, 2022
Party	Candidate	Votes	%	∆%
PH	Ewon Benedick	29,066	57.30	▲57.30
Heritage	Ignatius Darell Leiking	14,656	28.89	▼46.43
GRS	Kenny Chua Teck Ho	6,719	13.24	▲13.24
Independent	Richard Jimmy	289	0.57	▲0.57
Total valid votes		50,730	100.00	
Total rejected ballots		445		
Unreturned ballots		126		
Turnout		51,301	65.70	▼16.47
Registered electors		77,214		
Majority		14,410	28.41	▼26.04
PH gain from Heritage		Swing		?
Source(s) https://lom.agc.gov.my/ilims/upload/portal/akta/outputp/1753262/PUB619_2022.pdf

Malaysian general election, 2018
Party	Candidate	Votes	%	∆%
Sabah Heritage Party	Ignatius Darell Leiking	32,470	75.32	▲75.32
BN	Ceasar Mandela Malakun	8,997	20.87	▼13.43
Homeland Solidarity Party	Cleftus Stephen Spine	1,196	2.77	▼0.33
Sabah Native Co-operation Party	Edwin @ Jack Bosi	445	1.03	▲1.03
Total valid votes		43,108	100.00	
Total rejected ballots		417		
Unreturned ballots		134		
Turnout		43,659	82.17	▼1.04
Registered electors		53,131		
Majority		23,473	54.45	▲26.15
Sabah Heritage Party gain from PKR		Swing		?
Source(s) "His Majesty's Government Gazette - Notice of Contested Election, Parliament for the State of Sabah [P.U. (B) 246/2018]" (PDF). Attorney General's Chambers of Malaysia. 3 May 2018. "Federal Government Gazette - Results of Contested Election and Statements of the Poll after the Official Addition of Votes, Parliamentary Constituencies for the State of Sabah [P.U. (B) 320/2018]" (PDF). Attorney General's Chambers of Malaysia. 28 May 2018. Archived from the original (PDF) on 29 December 2019.

Malaysian general election, 2013
Party	Candidate	Votes	%	∆%
PKR	Ignatius Darell Leiking	22,598	62.60	▲20.98
BN	Bernard Giluk Dompok	12,382	34.30	▼19.65
STAR	Melania @ Melanie Annol	1,119	3.10	▲3.10
Total valid votes		36,099	100.00	
Total rejected ballots		719		
Unreturned ballots		64		
Turnout		36,882	83.21	▲11.88
Registered electors		44,323		
Majority		10,216	28.30	▲15.97
PKR gain from BN		Swing		?
Source(s) "Federal Government Gazette - Notice of Contested Election, Parliament for the State of Sabah [P.U. (B) 183/2013]" (PDF). Attorney General's Chambers of Malaysia. 26 April 2013. Archived from the original (PDF) on 30 September 2018. "Federal Government Gazette - Results of Contested Election and Statements of the Poll after the Official Addition of Votes, Parliamentary Constituencies for the State of Sabah [P.U. (B) 224/2013]" (PDF). Attorney General's Chambers of Malaysia. 22 May 2013. Archived from the original (PDF) on 30 September 2018.

Malaysian general election, 2008
Party	Candidate	Votes	%	∆%
BN	Bernard Giluk Dompok	13,400	53.95	▼21.49
PKR	Edwin @ Jack Bosi	10,337	41.62	▲37.55
Independent	Anthony Tibok	696	2.80	▲2.80
Independent	Levired Misih @ Willybroad Missi	404	1.63	▲1.63
Total valid votes		24,837	100.00	
Total rejected ballots		540		
Unreturned ballots		175		
Turnout		25,552	71.33	▲4.33
Registered electors		35,821		
Majority		3,063	12.33	▼47.21
BN hold		Swing		

Malaysian general election, 2004
Party	Candidate	Votes	%	∆%
BN	Donald Peter Mojuntin	16,032	75.44	▲20.25
DAP	Conrad Mojuntin	3,379	15.90	▲14.32
Independent	Joseph Suleiman	975	4.59	▲4.59
PKR	Blaise Mosidin @ Frederick Francis	864	4.07	▲4.07
Total valid votes		21,250	100.00	
Total rejected ballots		436		
Unreturned ballots		310		
Turnout		21,996	67.00	▲0.98
Registered electors		45,592		
Majority		12,653	59.54	▲47.58
BN hold		Swing		

Malaysian general election, 1999
Party	Candidate	Votes	%	∆%
BN	Philip Benedict Lasimbang	15,326	55.19	▲8.21
PBS	Jivol @ Edmund Doudilim	12,006	43.23	▼9.79
DAP	Chin Syn Fu	439	1.58	▲1.58
Total valid votes		27,771	100.00	
Total rejected ballots		353		
Unreturned ballots		1,980		
Turnout		30,104	66.02	▼7.52
Registered electors		39,174		
Majority		3,320	11.96	▲5.92
BN gain from PBS		Swing		?

Malaysian general election, 1995
Party	Candidate	Votes	%	∆%
PBS	Paulus @ Francis Nointin	14,652	53.02	▼24.95
BN	Bernard Giluk Dompok	12,982	46.98	▲46.98
Total valid votes		27,634	100.00	
Total rejected ballots		665		
Unreturned ballots		508		
Turnout		28,807	73.54	▲10.59
Registered electors		28,548		
Majority		1,670	6.04	▼49.90
PBS hold		Swing		

Malaysian general election, 1990
Party	Candidate	Votes	%	∆%
PBS	Bernard Giluk Dompok	12,654	77.97	▲77.97
DAP	Marcel Leiking @ Marshal	3,576	22.03	▲6.03
Total valid votes		16,230	100.00	
Total rejected ballots		1,740		
Unreturned ballots		0		
Turnout		17,970	62.95	▲0.09
Registered electors		28,548		
Majority		9,078	55.94	▲29.15
PBS gain from BN		Swing		?

Malaysian general election, 1986
Party	Candidate	Votes	%	∆%
BN	Bernard Giluk Dompok	6,659	52.32	▼14.88
Independent	Marcel Leiking @ Marshal	3,250	25.53	▲25.53
DAP	Peter Martin Tojipun	2,036	16.00	▲16.00
BERJAYA	Conrad Mojuntin	726	5.70	▲5.70
MOMOGUN	Edward Sinsua	57	0.45	▲0.45
Total valid votes		12,728	100.00	
Total rejected ballots		74		
Unreturned ballots		0		
Turnout		12,802	62.86	▼4.35
Registered electors		20,366		
Majority		3,409	26.79	▼7.61
BN hold		Swing		

Malaysian general election, 1982
Party	Candidate	Votes	%	∆%
BN	Clarence Elong Mansul	10,425	67.20	▲3.72
PASOK	Justine Jogumba Stimol	5,089	32.80	▼3.72
Total valid votes		15,514	100.00	
Total rejected ballots		216		
Unreturned ballots		0		
Turnout		15,730	67.21	▼3.67
Registered electors		23,404		
Majority		5,336	34.40	▲7.44
BN hold		Swing		

Malaysian general election, 1978
Party	Candidate	Votes	%	∆%
BN	Clarence Elong Mansul	8,444	63.48	▲63.48
Independent	Ignatius Stephen Malanjum	4,857	36.52	▲36.52
Total valid votes		13,301	100.00	
Total rejected ballots		327		
Unreturned ballots		0		
Turnout		13,628	70.88	
Registered electors		19,227		
Majority		3,587	26.96	
BN hold		Swing		

Malaysian general election, 1974
Party	Candidate	Votes	%	∆%
On the nomination day, James Stephen Tibok won uncontested.
BN	James Stephen Tibok			
Total valid votes			100.00	
Total rejected ballots				
Unreturned ballots				
Turnout				
Registered electors		16,092		
Majority				
BN gain from USNO		Swing		?

Malaysian general election, 1969
Party	Candidate	Votes	%
On the nomination day, James Stephen Tibok won uncontested.
USNO	James Stephen Tibok		
Total valid votes			100.00
Total rejected ballots			
Unreturned ballots			
Turnout			
Registered electors		15,512	
Majority			
This was a new constituency created.
