= Bernard Giluk Dompok =

Malaysian politician

Yang Berbahagia Tan Sri Datuk Seri Panglima Bernard Giluk Dompok PSM SPDK PPN
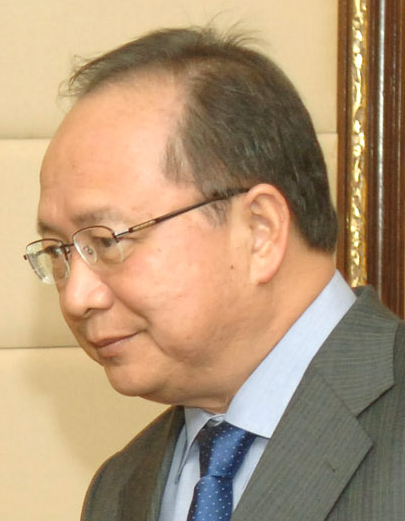

Minister of Plantation Industries and Commodities
- In office 10 April 2009 – 15 May 2013
- Monarchs: Mizan Zainal Abidin; Abdul Halim
- Prime Minister: Najib Razak
- Deputy: Hamzah Zainudin; Palanivel Govindasamy (2010–2011)
- Preceded by: Peter Chin Fah Kui
- Succeeded by: Douglas Uggah Embas
- Constituency: Penampang

Minister in the Prime Minister's Department
- In office 15 December 1999 – 9 April 2009
- Monarchs: Salahuddin; Sirajuddin; Mizan Zainal Abidin
- Prime Minister: Mahathir Mohamad; Abdullah Ahmad Badawi
- Deputy: Douglas Uggah Embas (1999–2001); Devamany S. Krishnasamy (2008–2009)
- Preceded by: Siti Zaharah Sulaiman
- Succeeded by: Koh Tsu Koon
- Constituency: Kinabalu; Ranau; Penampang

11th Chief Minister of Sabah
- In office 28 May 1998 – 14 March 1999
- Governor: Sakaran Dandai
- Deputy: Osu Sukam; Joseph Kurup; Tham Nyip Shen
- Preceded by: Yong Teck Lee
- Succeeded by: Osu Sukam
- Constituency: Moyog

Ambassador of Malaysia to the Holy See
- In office 17 March 2016 – 30 June 2018
- Monarchs: Abdul Halim; Muhammad V
- Prime Minister: Najib Razak; Mahathir Mohamad
- Preceded by: Position established
- Succeeded by: Westmoreland Edward Palon

Member of the Malaysian Parliament for Penampang
- In office 8 March 2008 – 5 May 2013
- Preceded by: Donald Peter Mojuntin (UPKO–BN)
- Succeeded by: Ignatius Dorell Leiking (PKR)
- Majority: 3,063 (2008)
- In office 2 August 1986 – 24 April 1995
- Preceded by: Clarence Elong Mansul (BERJAYA–BN)
- Succeeded by: Paul Francis Nointin (PBS)
- Majority: 3,409 (1986); 9,078 (1990)

Member of the Malaysian Parliament for Ranau (formerly Kinabalu)
- In office 29 November 1999 – 8 March 2004
- Preceded by: Henrynus Amin (PBS)
- Succeeded by: Siringan Gubat (UPKO–BN)
- Majority: 5,423 (1999); 1,387 (2004)

Member of the Sabah State Legislative Assembly for Moyog
- In office 5 May 1986 – 13 March 1999
- Preceded by: Ignatius Stephen Malanjum (PASOK)
- Succeeded by: Clarance Bongkos Malakun (PBS)
- Majority: 6,156 (1986); 7,113 (1990); 3,255 (1994)

Personal details
- Born: Bernard Giluk Dompok; 7 October 1949 (age 76) Inobong village, Penampang, Crown Colony of North Borneo (now Sabah, Malaysia)
- Party: United Sabah Party (PBS); Sabah Democratic Party (PDS); United Pasokmomogun Kadazandusun Murut Organisation (UPKO)
- Spouse(s): Valerie Binjiwan (deceased); Diana Alip
- Children: 5
- Education: University of East London
- Website: bernard-dompok.blogspot.com

Bernard Giluk Dompok (born 7 October 1949) is a Malaysian politician who served as Ambassador of Malaysia to the Holy See from March 2016 to June 2018, Minister of Plantation Industries and Commodities from April 2009 to May 2013, Minister in the Prime Minister's Department from December 1999 to April 2009, 11th Chief Minister of Sabah briefly from May 1998 to March 1999, Member of Parliament (MP) for Penampang from August 1986 to April 1995 and again from March 2008 to May 2013 and Ranau from November 1999 to March 2004 as well as President of the United Pasokmomogun Kadazandusun Murut Organisation (UPKO) from 1994 to 2014.

== Early life ==
He was born in Penampang, Sabah, and received his education in St Michael's School, Seria, Brunei, then later in St. Michael's School Donggongon, Penampang and finally in SM La Salle, Tanjung Aru, Kota Kinabalu. Later he obtained a Bachelor of Science degree from the University of East London. He is also a Fellow of the Royal Institution of Chartered Surveyors (RICS) and Fellow of the Royal Institution of Surveyors Malaysia (RISM).

== Career ==
He started his career as a valuer at the Sabah Lands & Surveys Department in 1978. Then he left the public sector and worked as a private valuer for about five years from 1980 until 1985.

== Political career ==
Initially a member of the United Sabah Party (PBS), Dompok contested, and won, both the Sabah State Legislative Assembly seat of Moyog, and the federal seat of Penampang, in separate 1986 elections. PBS won a majority in the state assembly at the election, and Dompok was appointed the state's finance minister.

He became the President of the UPKO, then known as the Sabah Democratic Party (PDS), in 1994. The party was formed when Dompok and others split from the PBS to join the Barisan Nasional (BN) coalition and deliver the coalition a majority in the Sabah State Legislative Assembly. After switching to the Barisan Nasional, he lost his parliamentary seat at the 1995 election to a PBS candidate.

Despite losing his federal seat, Dompok remained a state assemblyman and a senior member of the Barisan Nasional state government that he had helped to form. He served in a range of ministries in the state government, before assuming the post of Chief Minister, on a rotating basis, from 1998 to 1999. Dompok led the BN coalition to victory in the 1999 Sabah state election, however PDS were routed in the election, having lost all but 2 of their seats to PBS candidates, including Dompok's defeat in Moyog to PBS candidate Clarence Bongkos. In the aftermath of PDS poor performance, Dompok lost his chief ministership and the state BN chairman role that he held when he was appointed as Chief Minister in 1998 to UMNO Sabah chairman Osu Sukam. On 8 August 1999, at the party's fifth congress, PDS was renamed as UPKO to better reflect the main community that the party represented.

In the 1999 Malaysian general election he won the federal parliamentary seat of Kinabalu, defeating a PBS candidate. In 2004, he joined the Federal Cabinet as Minister in the Prime Minister's Department and in 2008, he became Minister of Plantation Industries and Commodities. His federal parliamentary career ended at the 2013 election, when he lost his parliamentary seat to Darell Leiking of the People's Justice Party (PKR).

== Diplomatic career ==
Bernard was recalled from his posting following the Pakatan Harapan (PH) government's decision to stop the previous practice adopted by the Barisan Nasional (BN) of appointing politicians to head overseas missions.

== Election results ==
Parliament of Malaysia
| Year | Constituency | Candidate | Votes | Pct | Opponent | Votes | Pct | Ballots cast | Majority | Turnout |
|---|---|---|---|---|---|---|---|---|---|---|
| 1986 | P143 Penampang | Bernard Giluk Dompok (PBS) | 6,659 | 52.02% | Marcel Leiking (IND) | 3,250 | 25.39% | 12,802 | 3,409 | 62.86% |
| 1986 | P143 Penampang | Bernard Giluk Dompok (PBS) | 6,659 | 52.02% | Peter Martin Tojipun (DAP) | 2,036 | 15.90% | 12,802 | 3,409 | 62.86% |
| 1986 | P143 Penampang | Bernard Giluk Dompok (PBS) | 6,659 | 52.02% | Conrad Mojuntin (BERJAYA) | 726 | 5.67% | 12,802 | 3,409 | 62.86% |
| 1986 | P143 Penampang | Bernard Giluk Dompok (PBS) | 6,659 | 52.02% | Edward Sinsua (MOMOGUN) | 57 | 0.45% | 12,802 | 3,409 | 62.86% |
| 1990 | P143 Penampang | Bernard Giluk Dompok (PBS) | 12,654 | 70.42% | Marcel Leiking (DAP) | 3,576 | 19.90% | 17,970 | 9,078 | 62.95% |
| 1995 | P152 Penampang | Bernard Giluk Dompok (PDS) | 12,982 | 45.07% | Francis Paul Nointin (PBS) | 14,652 | 50.86% | 28,807 | 1,670 | 73.54% |
| 1999 | P156 Kinabalu | Bernard Giluk Dompok (UPKO) | 11,723 | 63.36% | Janimin Saliun (PBS) | 6,300 | 34.05% | 18,502 | 5,423 | 72.44% |
| 1999 | P156 Kinabalu | Bernard Giluk Dompok (UPKO) | 11,723 | 63.36% | Wasimin Rashim (IND) | 175 | 0.95% | 18,502 | 5,423 | 72.44% |
| 2004 | P179 Ranau | Bernard Giluk Dompok (UPKO) | 7,547 | 38.31% | Ruhimin Adzim @ Ruhimin Ajim (IND) | 6,160 | 31.27% | 19,699 | 1,387 | 70.39% |
| 2004 | P179 Ranau | Bernard Giluk Dompok (UPKO) | 7,547 | 38.31% | Karim Adam (IND) | 3,310 | 16.80% | 19,699 | 1,387 | 70.39% |
| 2004 | P179 Ranau | Bernard Giluk Dompok (UPKO) | 7,547 | 38.31% | Japiril Suhaimin (IND) | 1,609 | 8.17% | 19,699 | 1,387 | 70.39% |
| 2008 | P174 Penampang | Bernard Giluk Dompok (UPKO) | 13,400 | 52.44% | Edwin Bosi (PKR) | 10,337 | 40.45% | 25,552 | 3,063 | 71.33% |
| 2008 | P174 Penampang | Bernard Giluk Dompok (UPKO) | 13,400 | 52.44% | Anthony Niwol Tibok (IND) | 696 | 2.72% | 25,552 | 3,063 | 71.33% |
| 2008 | P174 Penampang | Bernard Giluk Dompok (UPKO) | 13,400 | 52.44% | Levired Misih @ Willybroad Missi (IND) | 404 | 1.58% | 25,552 | 3,063 | 71.33% |
| 2013 | P174 Penampang | Bernard Giluk Dompok (UPKO) | 12,382 | 33.57% | Darell Leiking (PKR) | 22,598 | 61.27% | 36,882 | 10,216 | 83.21% |
| 2013 | P174 Penampang | Bernard Giluk Dompok (UPKO) | 12,382 | 33.57% | Melania @ Melanie Annol (STAR) | 1,119 | 3.03% | 36,882 | 10,216 | 83.21% |

Sabah State Legislative Assembly
| Year | Constituency | Candidate | Votes | Pct | Opponent(s) | Votes | Pct | Ballots cast | Majority | Turnout |
|---|---|---|---|---|---|---|---|---|---|---|
| 1986 | N26 Moyog | Bernard Giluk Dompok (PBS) | 6,714 | 91.60% | Bryan Matasim Lojingon (BERJAYA) | 558 | 7.61% | 7,330 | 6,156 | 77.13% |
| 1990 | N26 Moyog | Bernard Giluk Dompok (PBS) | 7,846 | 79.98% | Bryan Matasim Lojingon (BERJAYA) | 733 | 7.47% | 9,810 | 7,113 | 78.94% |
| 1990 | N26 Moyog | Bernard Giluk Dompok (PBS) | 7,846 | 79.98% | Lawrence Sinsua (AKAR) | 589 | 6.00% | 9,810 | 7,113 | 78.94% |
| 1990 | N26 Moyog | Bernard Giluk Dompok (PBS) | 7,846 | 79.98% | Peter Martin Tojipun (IND) | 365 | 3.72% | 9,810 | 7,113 | 78.94% |
| 1990 | N26 Moyog | Bernard Giluk Dompok (PBS) | 7,846 | 79.98% | Bernard Joseph Bai (PRS) | 132 | 1.35% | 9,810 | 7,113 | 78.94% |
| 1994 | N26 Moyog | Bernard Giluk Dompok (PBS) | 6,615 | 56.37% | Clarence Bongkos (IND) | 3,360 | 28.63% | 11,734 | 3,255 | 82.39% |
| 1994 | N26 Moyog | Bernard Giluk Dompok (PBS) | 6,615 | 56.37% | Edwin Richard (UMNO) | 1,445 | 12.31% | 11,734 | 3,255 | 82.39% |
| 1994 | N26 Moyog | Bernard Giluk Dompok (PBS) | 6,615 | 56.37% | Loh Chien Cheng (IND) | 25 | 0.21% | 11,734 | 3,255 | 82.39% |
| 1994 | N26 Moyog | Bernard Giluk Dompok (PBS) | 6,615 | 56.37% | Inus Molukun (SETIA) | 19 | 0.16% | 11,734 | 3,255 | 82.39% |
| 1999 | N16 Moyog | Bernard Giluk Dompok (PDS) | 6,482 | 36.36% | Clarence Bongkos (PBS) | 10,870 | 60.97% | 17,829 | 4,388 | 78.83% |
| 1999 | N16 Moyog | Bernard Giluk Dompok (PDS) | 6,482 | 36.36% | Benedict Mansul (BERSEKUTU) | 285 | 1.60% | 17,829 | 4,388 | 78.83% |
| 1999 | N16 Moyog | Bernard Giluk Dompok (PDS) | 6,482 | 36.36% | Conrad Mojuntin (IND) | 59 | 0.33% | 17,829 | 4,388 | 78.83% |
| 1999 | N16 Moyog | Bernard Giluk Dompok (PDS) | 6,482 | 36.36% | Ignatius Matayun (IND) | 20 | 0.11% | 17,829 | 4,388 | 78.83% |
| 1999 | N16 Moyog | Bernard Giluk Dompok (PDS) | 6,482 | 36.36% | Cleftus Mojingol (PASOK) | 18 | 0.10% | 17,829 | 4,388 | 78.83% |

== Family ==
He is currently married to Puan Sri Diana Alip Yapil, a Tambunan Dusun native and the couple have five children in total (four from his current marriage and one from a previous marriage).

== Honours ==
- Malaysia
  - Commander of the Order of Loyalty to the Crown of Malaysia (PSM) – Tan Sri (1997)
  - Medal of the Order of the Defender of the Realm (PPN) (1975)
- Sabah
  - Grand Commander of the Order of Kinabalu (SPDK) – Datuk Seri Panglima (1995)
  - Commander of the Order of Kinabalu (PGDK) – Datuk (1987)

== See also ==
- Penampang (federal constituency)

Diplomatic posts
| Preceded by Office established | Ambassador of Malaysia to the Holy See; 2016–2018 | Succeeded by Westmoreland Edward Palon |
Political offices
| Preceded by Yong Teck Lee | Chief Minister of Sabah; 1998–1999 | Succeeded by Osu Sukam |
