= Donald Peter Mojuntin =

Malaysian politician and lawyer

Yang Berhormat Datuk Donald Peter Mojuntin PGDK JP MLA
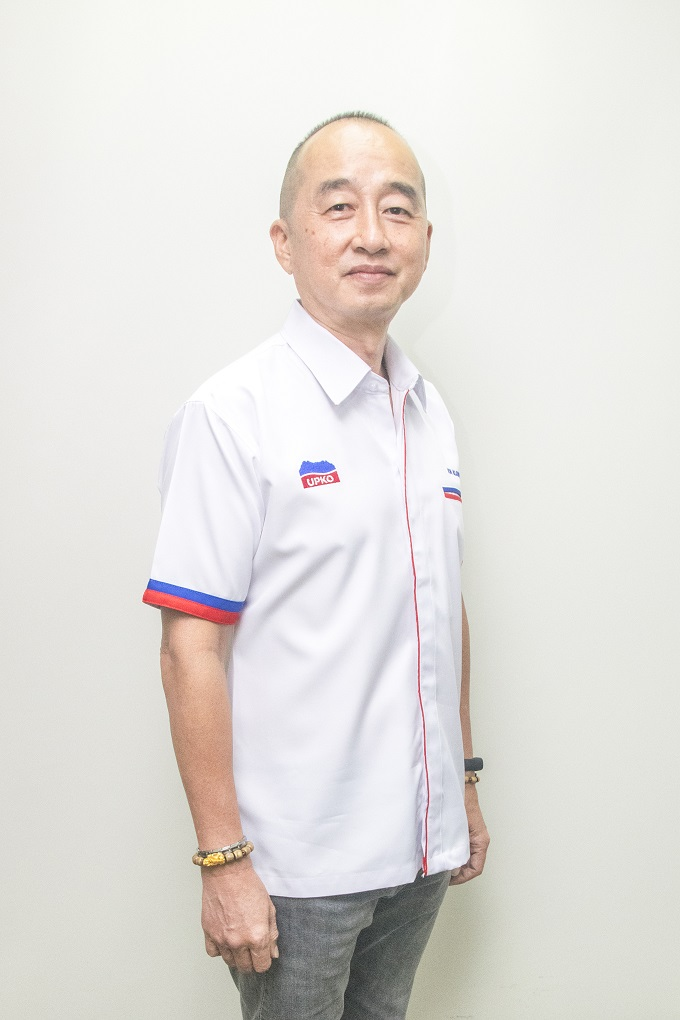

Senator Elected by the Sabah State Legislative Assembly
- In office 10 December 2018 – 9 December 2021 Serving with Abdul Ghani Mohamed Yassin (until January 2021); Bobbey Ah Fang Suan
- Monarchs: Muhammad V (2018–2019); Abdullah (2019–2021)
- Prime Minister: Mahathir Mohamad (2018–2020); Muhyiddin Yassin (2020–2021); Ismail Sabri Yaakob (2021)
- Preceded by: Lucas Umbul
- Succeeded by: Noraini Idris

Member of the Malaysian Parliament for Penampang
- In office 21 March 2004 – 8 March 2008
- Preceded by: Philip Benedict Lasimbang
- Succeeded by: Bernard Giluk Dompok
- Majority: 12,653 (2004)

Member of the Sabah State Legislative Assembly for Moyog
- Incumbent
- Assumed office 29 November 2025
- Preceded by: Darell Leiking
- Majority: 2,618 (2025)
- In office 8 March 2008 – 5 May 2013
- Preceded by: Philip Benedict Lasimbang
- Succeeded by: Terrence Siambun
- Majority: 2,685 (2008)

Vice President of the Pakatan Harapan
- In office 26 August 2021 – 3 January 2026 Serving with Chong Chieng Jen & Salahuddin Ayub (until 2023) & M. Kulasegaran & Christina Liew Chin Jin
- President: Wan Azizah Wan Ismail
- Chairman: Anwar Ibrahim
- Preceded by: Mukhriz Mahathir

Deputy President of the United Progressive Kinabalu Organisation
- Incumbent
- Assumed office 23 November 2019
- President: Wilfred Madius Tangau (2019–2022); Ewon Benedick (since 2023)
- Preceded by: Wilfred Madius Tangau

Personal details
- Born: Donald Peter Mojuntin; 26 January 1965 (age 61) St. Joseph's Maternity Home, Kampung Kambau, Donggongon, Penampang, Sabah, Malaysia
- Citizenship: Malaysian
- Party: United Progressive Kinabalu Organisation (UPKO)
- Other political affiliations: Barisan Nasional (BN) (until 2018); Pakatan Harapan (PH) (2021–2025); Gabungan Rakyat Sabah (GRS) (since 2026)
- Spouse: Pornnipa Rattanaruangjit
- Parent(s): Peter Joinud Mojuntin (father, deceased); Nancy Mary Lidwin Mobijohn (mother, deceased)
- Education: Ratcliffe College; University of Westminster
- Occupation: Politician
- Profession: Lawyer

Donald Peter Mojuntin (born 26 January 1965) is a Malaysian politician and lawyer who served as a Senator from December 2018 to December 2021, Member of the Sabah State Legislative Assembly (MLA) for Moyog from March 2008 to May 2013 and once again since 2025 and also Member of Parliament (MP) for Penampang from March 2004 to March 2008. He is a member of the United Progressive Kinabalu Organisation (UPKO), a component party of the Pakatan Harapan (PH) coalition. He has served as the Vice President of PH from August 2021 until January 2026 and Deputy President of UPKO since November 2019. He is also the son of former State Minister of Housing and Local Government of Sabah, Datuk Peter Joinod Mojuntin who died in the Sabah Air GAF Nomad crash on 6 June 1976.

== Early life and education ==
Donald Peter Mojuntin was born in St. Joseph's Maternity Home, Kampung Kambau, Donggongon, Penampang on 26 January 1965. He studied in Sacred Heart Primary School, La Salle Secondary School and later Ratcliffe College. He was awarded a Bachelor of Law (Hons.) in 1984 from University of Westminster.

He firstly began working as a lawyer with the Richard Malanjum, Idang & Rantau law firm from 1991 to 1992, then established his own law firm known as Mojuntin & Doudilim from 1992 to 1993, and later changed his law firm's name to Donald Mojuntin & Seibing Gunting from 1994 to 1995.

== Politics ==
He became the Political Secretary to the Sabah Minister of Tourism and Environment in 1995 and to the then-Chief Minister of Sabah, Bernard Giluk Dompok in 1998. He was also the Private Secretary to the Minister in the Prime Minister's Department from 2001 to 2003. Furthermore, he was Sabah Assistant Minister of Resources and Information Technology Development from 2008 to 2010 and Sabah Assistant Finance Minister from 2010 to 2013.

He joined UPKO (then known as its old name Sabah Democratic Party (PDS)) Penampang in 1994 and was appointed as a Member of the UPKO Supreme Council and Chairman of UPKO Kepayan Division. He was also the Youth Chief of UPKO Penampang and Deputy Chairman of UPKO Penampang.

== Private life ==
He married his wife, Pornnipa Rattanaruangjit, a Thai woman on 26 June 1989 whilst they were studying in London. Among his hobbies are playing badminton, football and golf.

== Election result ==
Parliament of Malaysia
Year	Constituency	Candidate	Votes	Pct.	Opponent(s)	Votes	Pct.	Ballots cast	Majority	Turnout
2004	P174 Penampang	Donald Peter Mojuntin (UPKO)	16,032	72.89%	Conrad Mojuntin (DAP)	3,379	15.36%	21,996	12,653	67.00%
2004	P174 Penampang	Donald Peter Mojuntin (UPKO)	16,032	72.89%	Joseph Suleiman (IND)	975	4.43%	21,996	12,653	67.00%
2004	P174 Penampang	Donald Peter Mojuntin (UPKO)	16,032	72.89%	Blaise Mosidin @ Frederick Francis (PKR)	864	3.93%	21,996	12,653	67.00%

Sabah State Legislative Assembly
Year	Constituency	Candidate	Votes	Pct.	Opponent(s)	Votes	Pct.	Ballots cast	Majority	Turnout
2008	N20 Moyog	Donald Peter Mojuntin (UPKO)	6,782	60.58%	Moris @ Francis Miji (PKR)	4,097	36.60%	11,195	2,685	74.15%
2008	N20 Moyog	Donald Peter Mojuntin (UPKO)	6,782	60.58%	Levired Misih @ Willybroad Missi (IND)	166	1.48%	11,195	2,685	74.15%
2018	N20 Moyog	Donald Peter Mojuntin (UPKO)	5,303	32.94%	Jennifer Lasimbang (WARISAN)	9,745	60.53%	16,100	4,442	82.75%
2018	N20 Moyog	Donald Peter Mojuntin (UPKO)	5,303	32.94%	Danim @ Aloysius Siap (STAR)	605	3.76%	16,100	4,442	82.75%
2018	N20 Moyog	Donald Peter Mojuntin (UPKO)	5,303	32.94%	Bandasan @ Dionisius Dennis J Tunding (PCS)	222	1.39%	16,100	4,442	82.75%
2025	N26 Moyog	Donald Peter Mojuntin (UPKO)	9,108	43.03%	Terrence Siambun (WARISAN)	6,490	30.66%	21,166	2,618	68.09%
2025	N26 Moyog	Donald Peter Mojuntin (UPKO)	9,108	43.03%	Joe Suleiman (STAR)	1,805	8.53%	21,166	2,618	68.09%
2025	N26 Moyog	Donald Peter Mojuntin (UPKO)	9,108	43.03%	Joeynodd Bansin (PBS)	1,620	7.65%	21,166	2,618	68.09%
2025	N26 Moyog	Donald Peter Mojuntin (UPKO)	9,108	43.03%	Remysta Jimmy Taylor (PKR)	946	4.47%	21,166	2,618	68.09%
2025	N26 Moyog	Donald Peter Mojuntin (UPKO)	9,108	43.03%	Mckery Victor (KDM)	669	3.16%	21,166	2,618	68.09%
2025	N26 Moyog	Donald Peter Mojuntin (UPKO)	9,108	43.03%	Francis Mojikon (BERSATU)	160	0.76%	21,166	2,618	68.09%
2025	N26 Moyog	Donald Peter Mojuntin (UPKO)	9,108	43.03%	Ricky Chang (IND)	110	0.52%	21,166	2,618	68.09%
2025	N26 Moyog	Donald Peter Mojuntin (UPKO)	9,108	43.03%	Richard Ronald Dompok (PKS)	84	0.40%	21,166	2,618	68.09%
2025	N26 Moyog	Donald Peter Mojuntin (UPKO)	9,108	43.03%	Peter Maurice Lidadun (IND)	76	0.36%	21,166	2,618	68.09%
2025	N26 Moyog	Donald Peter Mojuntin (UPKO)	9,108	43.03%	Cleftus Stephen Spine @ Sipain (IMPIAN)	68	0.32%	21,166	2,618	68.09%
2025	N26 Moyog	Donald Peter Mojuntin (UPKO)	9,108	43.03%	Walter Norbert Johnny (PBK)	30	0.14%	21,166	2,618	68.09%

== Honours ==
- Sabah
  - Commander of the Order of Kinabalu (PGDK) – Datuk (2010)
  - Justice of the Peace (JP) (2008)
  - Companion of the Order of Kinabalu (ASDK) (2006)
  - Member of the Order of Kinabalu (ADK) (2000)
