= Conrad Mojuntin =

Malaysian politician (1948–2021)

Yang Berbahagia Datuk Conrad Jomilon Mojuntin PGDK KMN

Sabah Minister of Culture, Youth and Sports
- In office 1983–1985

Member of the Sabah State Legislative Assembly for Moyog
- In office 1976–1985
- Preceded by: Peter Joinod Mojuntin
- Succeeded by: Ignatius Stephen Malanjum

Personal details
- Born: Conrad Jomilon Mojuntin; 6 April 1948
- Died: 17 November 2021 (aged 73)
- Citizenship: Malaysian
- Party: BERJAYA (till 1990); DAP (since 2004)
- Other political affiliations: Pakatan Rakyat (2008–2015); Pakatan Harapan (since 2015)
- Spouse: Theresa Ali Bajarai
- Relations: Peter Joinod Mojuntin (brother); Donald Peter Mojuntin (nephew)
- Occupation: Politician

Conrad Jomilon Mojuntin (6 April 1948 – 17 November 2021) was a Malaysian politician. He was the Sabah Minister of Culture, Youth and Sports from 1983 to 1985 and Assistant Minister to the Chief Minister from 1981 to 1983. He was the Member of Sabah State Legislative Assembly for Moyog from 1976 to 1985. He died on 17 November 2021 as a result of a stroke.

== Controversies ==
=== Murder of Anthony Chong ===
On 23 October 2005, Conrad and 10 other people was remanded due to the murder of Anthony Chong Kim Fook, in front of Penampang Public Library. Anthony was shot by a shotgun after an argument earlier that day in a pub. Conrad had a license to own a shotgun but the person who took the shot was unknown. On 1 April 2008, Conrad was first acquitted in the Magistrate Court but on 2 January 2009, was sentenced to 6 months jail in the Kota Kinabalu High Court.

== Health ==
He died on 17 November 2021 due to stroke.

== Election result ==
Parliament of Malaysia
Year	Constituency	Candidate	Votes	Pct.	Opponent(s)	Votes	Pct.	Ballots cast	Majority	Turnout
1986	P143 Penampang	Conrad Mojuntin (BERJAYA)	726	5.67%	Bernard Giluk Dompok (PBS)	6,659	52.02%	12,802	3,409	62.86%
1986	P143 Penampang	Conrad Mojuntin (BERJAYA)	726	5.67%	Marcel Leiking @ Marshal (IND)	3,250	25.39%	12,802	3,409	62.86%
1986	P143 Penampang	Conrad Mojuntin (BERJAYA)	726	5.67%	Peter Martin Tojipun (DAP)	2,036	15.90%	12,802	3,409	62.86%
1986	P143 Penampang	Conrad Mojuntin (BERJAYA)	726	5.67%	Edward Sinsua (MOMOGUN)	57	0.45%	12,802	3,409	62.86%
2004	P174 Penampang	Conrad Mojuntin (DAP)	3,379	15.36%	Donald Peter Mojuntin (UPKO)	16,032	72.89%	21,996	12,653	67.00%
2004	P174 Penampang	Conrad Mojuntin (DAP)	3,379	15.36%	Joseph Suleiman (IND)	975	4.43%	21,996	12,653	67.00%
2004	P174 Penampang	Conrad Mojuntin (DAP)	3,379	15.36%	Blaise Mosidin @ Frederick Francis (PKR)	864	3.93%	21,996	12,653	67.00%

Sabah State Legislative Assembly
Year	Constituency	Candidate	Votes	Pct.	Opponent(s)	Votes	Pct.	Ballots cast	Majority	Turnout
1999	N16 Moyog	Conrad Mojuntin (IND)	59	0.33%	Clarence Bongkos (PBS)	10,870	60.97%	17,829	4,388	78.83%
1999	N16 Moyog	Conrad Mojuntin (IND)	59	0.33%	Bernard Giluk Dompok (UPKO)	6,482	36.36%	17,829	4,388	78.83%
1999	N16 Moyog	Conrad Mojuntin (IND)	59	0.33%	Benedict Mansul (BERSEKUTU)	285	1.60%	17,829	4,388	78.83%
1999	N16 Moyog	Conrad Mojuntin (IND)	59	0.33%	Ignatius Matayun (IND)	20	0.11%	17,829	4,388	78.83%
1999	N16 Moyog	Conrad Mojuntin (IND)	59	0.33%	Cleftus Mojingol (PASOK)	18	0.10%	17,829	4,388	78.83%
2004	N20 Moyog	Conrad Mojuntin (DAP)	760	7.63%	Philip Benedict Lasimbang (UPKO)	5,692	57.17%	9,957	2,568	68.96%
2004	N20 Moyog	Conrad Mojuntin (DAP)	760	7.63%	Moris @ Francis Miji (IND)	3,124	31.37%	9,957	2,568	68.96%
2004	N20 Moyog	Conrad Mojuntin (DAP)	760	7.63%	Elsie @ Feliescia Solumin (IND)	202	2.03%	9,957	2,568	68.96%

== Honours ==
- Malaysia
  - Officer of the Order of the Defender of the Realm (KMN) (1979)
- Sabah
  - Commander of the Order of Kinabalu (PGDK) – Datuk (1981)
