= Darell Leiking =

Malaysian politician

Yang Berbahagia Datuk Ignatius Darell Leiking PGDK
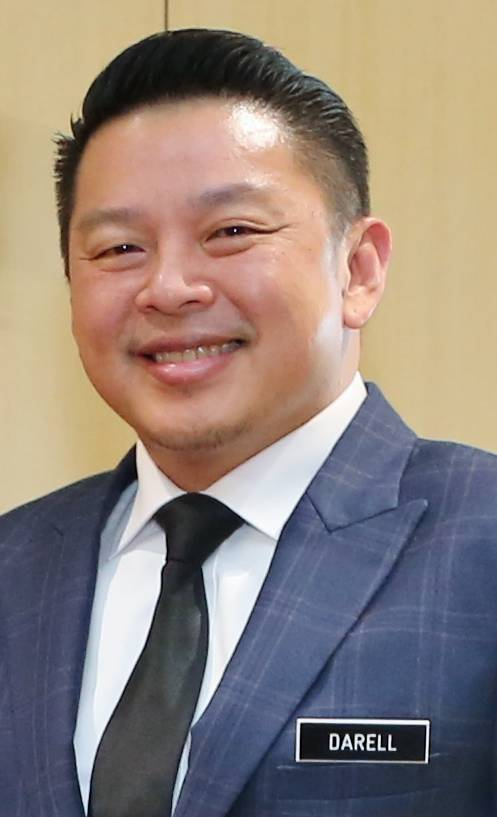

Minister of International Trade and Industry of Malaysia
- In office 2 July 2018 – 24 February 2020
- Monarchs: Muhammad V (2018–2019); Abdullah (2019–2020)
- Prime Minister: Mahathir Mohamad
- Deputy: Ong Kian Ming
- Preceded by: Mustapa Mohamed
- Succeeded by: Azmin Ali
- Constituency: Penampang

Member of the Malaysian Parliament for Penampang
- In office 5 May 2013 – 19 November 2022
- Preceded by: Bernard Giluk Dompok (BN–UPKO)
- Succeeded by: Ewon Benedick (PH–UPKO)
- Majority: 10,216 (2013); 23,473 (2018)

Member of the Sabah State Legislative Assembly for Moyog
- In office 26 September 2020 – 29 November 2025
- Preceded by: Jennifer Lasimbang (WARISAN)
- Succeeded by: Donald Peter Mojuntin (UPKO)
- Majority: 5,935 (2020)

1st Deputy President of the Heritage Party
- Incumbent
- Assumed office 17 October 2016
- President: Shafie Apdal
- Preceded by: Position established

Personal details
- Born: 23 August 1971 (age 55) Penampang, Sabah, Malaysia
- Citizenship: Malaysian
- Party: People's Justice Party (PKR) (2013–2016); Heritage Party (WARISAN) (since 2016)
- Other political affiliations: Pakatan Rakyat (PR) (2013–2015); Pakatan Harapan (PH) (2015–2016)
- Education: University of Hertfordshire
- Occupation: Politician

Darell Leiking, also known as Ignatius Dorell Leiking (born 23 August 1971) is a Malaysian politician who has served as Member of the Sabah State Legislative Assembly (MLA) for Moyog since September 2020. He served as the Minister of International Trade and Industry in the Pakatan Harapan (PH) administration under former Prime Minister Mahathir Mohamad from July 2018 to the collapse of the PH administration in February 2020 and the Member of Parliament (MP) for Penampang from May 2013 to November 2022. He is a member of the Heritage Party (WARISAN) and was a member of the People's Justice Party (PKR), a component party of the PH and formerly Pakatan Rakyat (PR) coalitions. He has also served as the 1st and founding Deputy President of the WARISAN since party foundation in October 2016.

== Political career ==
=== State rights ===
Darell is one of many Sabah politicians who fight for the state rights as enshrined in the Malaysia Agreement, and he constantly urges the government to provide a definite solution to the problem of illegal immigrants in the state, especially the problems caused by Project IC with the huge influx of Filipino refugees, and to set to rest the North Borneo dispute once and for all. He has rejected controversial remarks made towards other minority groups by a prominent minister in the cabinet, which was echoed by Baru Bian of the People's Justice Party (PKR). He has also spoken out against discrimination towards other ethnic groups by certain politicians.

=== Minister of International Trade and Industry (2018–2020) ===
The 2018 general election saw the first ever transition of power in the Malaysian history. Then PH opposition coalition was elected as the government after defeating the ruling Barisan Nasional (BN) coalition. PH then formed the coalition government with WARISAN. On 2 July 2018, Darell was appointed as Minister of International Trade and Industry. On 24 February 2020, Darell lost his position after the PH government collapsed due to its loss of majority support in the Parliament.

=== Member of Parliament (2013–2022) ===
==== 2013 general election ====
In the 2013 general election, Darell made his electoral debut after being nominated by PR to contest for the Penampang federal seat. He won the seat and was elected to the Parliament as the Penampang MP for the first term after defeating Bernard Giluk Dompok of BN and Melania Annol of the Parti Aspirasi Rakyat Sarawak of Sabah (Sabah STAR) by a majority of 10,216 votes.

==== 2018 general election ====
In the 2018 general election, Darell was nominated by WARISAN to defend the Penampang seat. He defended the seat and was reelected as the Penampang MP for the second term after defeating his cousin Ceasar Mandela Malakun of BN, Cleftus Stephen Spine of the Homeland Solidarity Party (STAR) and Edwin Bosi of the Sabah Native Cooperation Party (PKAN) by a majority of 23,473 votes.

==== 2022 general election ====
In the 2022 general election, Darell was renominated by WARISAN to defend the Penampang seat. He lost the seat and was not reelected as the Penampang MP for the third term after losing to Ewon Benedick of PH by a minority of 14,410 votes.

=== Member of the Sabah State Legislative Assembly (since 2020) ===
In the 2020 Sabah state election, Darell was renominated by WARISAN to contest for the Moyog state seat. He won the seat and was elected into the Sabah State Legislative Assembly as the Moyog MLA for the first term after defeating Joseph Suleiman of STAR, John Chryso Masabal of the United Sabah Party (PBS), William Sampil of the Love Sabah Party (PCS), Marcel Annol of the Liberal Democratic Party (LDP), Vinson Loijon of the Sabah People's Unity Party (PPRS) and independent candidate Robert Richard Foo by a majority of 5,935 votes.

== Election results ==
Parliament of Malaysia
Year	Constituency	Candidate	Votes	Pct	Opponent(s)	Votes	Pct	Ballots cast	Majority	Turnout
2013	P174 Penampang	Darell Leiking (PKR)	22,598	62.60%	Bernard Giluk Dompok (UPKO)	12,382	34.30%	36,818	10,216	83.21%
2013	P174 Penampang	Darell Leiking (PKR)	22,598	62.60%	Melania Annol (STAR)	1,119	3.10%	36,818	10,216	83.21%
2018	P174 Penampang	Darell Leiking (WARISAN)	32,470	75.32%	Ceasar Mandela Malakun (UPKO)	8,997	20.87%	43,525	23,473	82.17%
2018	P174 Penampang	Darell Leiking (WARISAN)	32,470	75.32%	Cleftus Stephen Spine (STAR)	1,196	2.77%	43,525	23,473	82.17%
2018	P174 Penampang	Darell Leiking (WARISAN)	32,470	75.32%	Edwin Bosi (PKAN)	445	1.03%	43,525	23,473	82.17%
2022	P174 Penampang	Darell Leiking (WARISAN)	14,656	28.89%	Ewon Benedick (UPKO)	29,066	57.30%	50,730	14,410	65.70%
2022	P174 Penampang	Darell Leiking (WARISAN)	14,656	28.89%	Kenny Chua Teck Ho (STAR)	6,719	13.24%	50,730	14,410	65.70%
2022	P174 Penampang	Darell Leiking (WARISAN)	14,656	28.89%	Richard Jimmy (IND)	289	0.57%	50,730	14,410	65.70%

Sabah State Legislative Assembly
Year	Constituency	Candidate	Votes	Pct	Opponent(s)	Votes	Pct	Ballots cast	Majority	Turnout
2020	N26 Moyog	Darell Leiking (WARISAN)	8,437	62.83%	Joseph Suleiman (STAR)	2,502	18.64%	13,427	5,935	68.98%
2020	N26 Moyog	Darell Leiking (WARISAN)	8,437	62.83%	John Chryso Masabal (PBS)	1,175	8.75%	13,427	5,935	68.98%
2020	N26 Moyog	Darell Leiking (WARISAN)	8,437	62.83%	William Sampil (PCS)	975	7.26%	13,427	5,935	68.98%
2020	N26 Moyog	Darell Leiking (WARISAN)	8,437	62.83%	Marcel Annol (LDP)	185	1.38%	13,427	5,935	68.98%
2020	N26 Moyog	Darell Leiking (WARISAN)	8,437	62.83%	Vinson Loijon (PPRS)	82	0.61%	13,427	5,935	68.98%
2020	N26 Moyog	Darell Leiking (WARISAN)	8,437	62.83%	Robert Richard Foo (IND)	71	0.53%	13,427	5,935	68.98%

== Honours ==
=== Honours of Malaysia ===
- Sabah
  - Commander of the Order of Kinabalu (PGDK) – Datuk (2018)

=== Foreign honours ===
- South Korea
  - Gwanghwa Medal of the Order of Diplomatic Service Merit (2020)
