= Moyog =

Moyog (N26)
Sabah constituency

State constituency
- Legislature: Sabah State Legislative Assembly
MLA
Donald Peter Mojuntin
GRS
- Constituency created: 1967
- First contested: 1967
- Last contested: 2025

Demographics
- Electors (2025): 31,084

Moyog is a state constituency in Sabah, Malaysia, that is represented in the Sabah State Legislative Assembly.

== Demographics ==
As of 2020, Moyog has a population of 59,533 people.

Ethnic breakdown of Moyog's electorate as of 2025
1. Non-Muslim Bumiputera (85.0%)
2. Muslim Bumiputera (9.00%)
3. Chinese (5.00%)
4. Other ethnicities (1.00%)

== History ==
=== Polling districts ===
According to the gazette issued on 31 October 2022, the Moyog constituency has a total of 7 polling districts.

State constituency	Polling District	Code	Location
Moyog (N26)	Buit	174/26/01	SK Buit Hill
Moyog (N26)	Guunsing	174/26/02	SMK Datuk Peter Mojuntin
Moyog (N26)	Penampang Utara	174/26/03	SMK St. Michael Donggongon; SK Kibabaig
Moyog (N26)	Nambazan	174/26/04	SMK Limbanak
Moyog (N26)	Kuai	174/26/05	Dewan Institut Memandu KMK (Khidmat Memandu Kinabalu Sdn Bhd)
Moyog (N26)	Limbanak	174/26/06	SK St. Aloysius Limbanak; SK Sugud
Moyog (N26)	Terian	174/26/07	SK Terian
Moyog (N26)	Moyog	174/26/08	SK Moyog
Moyog (N26)	Inobong	174/26/09	SK St. Theresa Inobong; SK St. Paul Kolopis; SK Putaton Inobong
Moyog (N26)	Tanaki	174/26/10	SK St. Joseph Kambau
Moyog (N26)	Buayan	174/26/11	SK Buayan
Moyog (N26)	Longkogungan	174/26/12	SK Longkokungan
Moyog (N26)	Babagon	174/26/13	SK Babagon

=== Representation history ===
Member of Sabah State Legislative Assembly for Moyog
Assembly	No	Years	Member	Party
Constituency created
3d	N11	1967 – 1971	Peter Joinud Mojuntin	UPKO
4th	N11	1971 – 1976	Peter Joinud Mojuntin	Alliance (USNO)
5th	N23	1976	Peter Joinud Mojuntin	BERJAYA
5th	N23	1976 – 1981	Conrad Mojuntin	BERJAYA
6th	N23	1981 – 1985	Conrad Mojuntin	BN (BERJAYA)
7th	N26	1985 – 1986	Ignatius Stephen Malanjum	PASOK
8th	N26	1986 – 1990	Bernard Giluk Dompok	PBS
9th	N26	1990 – 1994	Bernard Giluk Dompok	GR (PBS)
10th	N26	1994	Bernard Giluk Dompok	GR (PBS)
10th	N26	1994 – 1999	Bernard Giluk Dompok	BN (PDS)
11th	N16	1999 – 2002	Clarence Bongkos Malakun	PBS
11th	N16	2002 – 2004	Clarence Bongkos Malakun	BN (UPKO)
12th	N20	2004 – 2008	Philip Benedict Lasimbang	BN (UPKO)
13th	N20	2008 – 2013	Donald Peter Mojuntin	BN (UPKO)
14th	N20	2013 – 2016	Terrence Siambun	PKR
14th	N20	2016	Terrence Siambun	Independent
14th	N20	2016 – 2018	Terrence Siambun	WARISAN
15th	N20	2018 – 2020	Jennifer Lasimbang	WARISAN
16th	N26	2020 – 2025	Darell Leiking	WARISAN
17th	N26	2025–2026	Donald Peter Mojuntin	UPKO
17th	N26	2026–present	Donald Peter Mojuntin	GRS (UPKO)

== Election results ==
Sabah state election, 2025: Moyog
Party	Candidate	Votes	%	∆%
UPKO	Donald Peter Mojuntin	9,108	43.03	▲43.03
Heritage	Terrence Siambun	6,490	30.66	▼31.21
Homeland Solidarity Party	Joe Suleiman	1,805	8.53	▲8.53
GRS	Joeynodd Bansin	1,620	7.65	▲7.65
PH	Remysta Jimmy Taylor	946	4.47	▲4.47
KDM	Mckery Victor Ninin	669	3.16	▲3.16
PN	Francis Mojikon	160	0.76	▼17.59
Independent	Ricky Chang	110	0.52	▲0.52
Sabah Nationality Party	Richard Ronald Dompok	84	0.40	▲0.40
Independent	Peter Maurice Lidadun	76	0.36	▲0.36
Sabah Dream Party	Cleftus Stephen Spine	68	0.32	▲0.32
PBK	Walter Norbert Johnny	30	0.14	▲0.14
Total valid votes		21,166		
Total rejected ballots		226		
Unreturned ballots		23		
Turnout		21,415	68.89	▼1.17
Registered electors		31,084		
Majority		2,618	12.37	▼31.15
UPKO gain from Heritage		Swing		?
Source(s) "RESULTS OF CONTESTED ELECTION AND STATEMENTS OF THE POLL AFTER THE OFFICIAL ADDITION OF VOTES" (PDF).

Sabah state election, 2020: Moyog
Party	Candidate	Votes	%	∆%
Sabah Heritage Party	Darell Leiking	8,437	61.87	▲1.34
PN	Joe Suleiman	2,502	18.35	N/A
PBS	John Chryso Masabal	1,175	8.62	N/A
Love Sabah Party	William Sampil	975	7.15	▲5.76
LDP	Marcel Annol	185	1.36	N/A
Sabah People's Unity Party	Vinson Loijon	82	0.60	N/A
Independent	Robert Richard Foo	71	0.52	N/A
Total valid votes		13,427	98.46	
Total rejected ballots		177	1.30	
Unreturned ballots		33	0.24	
Turnout		13,637	70.06	
Registered electors		19,465		
Majority		5,935	43.52	
Sabah Heritage Party hold		Swing		N/A
Source(s) "RESULTS OF CONTESTED ELECTION AND STATEMENTS OF THE POLL AFTER THE OFFICIAL ADDITION OF VOTES".

Sabah state election, 2018: Moyog
Party	Candidate	Votes	%	∆%
Sabah Heritage Party	Jennifer Lasimbang	9,745	60.53	N/A
BN	Donald Peter Mojuntin	5,303	32.94	▼5.98
STAR	Danim @ Aloysius Siap	605	3.76	▼0.30
Love Sabah Party	Bandasan @ Dionisius Dennis J Tunding	222	1.39	N/A
Total valid votes		15,875	98.60	
Total rejected ballots		202	1.25	
Unreturned ballots		23	0.14	
Turnout		16,100	82.75	
Registered electors		19,456		
Majority		4,442		
Sabah Heritage Party gain from PKR		Swing		N/A
Source(s) "RESULTS OF CONTESTED ELECTION AND STATEMENTS OF THE POLL AFTER THE OFFICIAL ADDITION OF VOTES".

Sabah state election, 2013: Moyog
Party	Candidate	Votes	%	∆%
PKR	Terrence Siambun	7,462	50.25	▲13.65
BN	Philip Benedict Lasimbang	5,780	38.92	▼21.66
SAPP	Danim @ Aloysius Siap	779	5.25	N/A
STAR	Bernard Lawrence Solibun	603	4.06	N/A
Total valid votes		14,624	98.48	
Total rejected ballots		204	1.37	
Unreturned ballots		22	0.15	
Turnout		14,850	84.60	
Registered electors		17,556		
Majority		1,682		
PKR gain from BN		Swing		▲17.66
Source(s) "KEPUTUSAN PILIHAN RAYA UMUM DEWAN UNDANGAN NEGERI".

Sabah state election, 2008: Moyog
Party	Candidate	Votes	%	∆%
BN	Donald Peter Mojuntin	6,782	60.58	▲3.41
PKR	Moris @ Francis Miji	4,097	36.60	N/A
Independent	Levired Misih @ Willybroad Missi	166	1.48	N/A
Total valid votes		11,045	98.66	
Total rejected ballots		119	1.06	
Unreturned ballots		31	0.28	
Turnout		11,195	74.15	
Registered electors		15,098		
Majority		2,685		
BN hold		Swing		N/A
Source(s) "KEPUTUSAN PILIHAN RAYA UMUM DEWAN UNDANGAN NEGERI SABAH BAGI TAHUN 2008".

Sabah state election, 2004: Moyog
Party	Candidate	Votes	%	∆%
BN	Philip Benedict Lasimbang	5,692	57.17	▲20.81
Independent	Moris @ Francis Miji	3,124	31.37	N/A
DAP	Conrad Mojuntin	760	7.63	N/A
Independent	Elsie @ Feliescia Solumin	202	2.03	N/A
Total valid votes		9,778	98.20	
Total rejected ballots		179	1.80	
Unreturned ballots		0	0.00	
Turnout		9,957	68.96	
Registered electors		14,439		
Majority		2,568		
BN gain from PBS		Swing		N/A
Source(s) "KEPUTUSAN PILIHAN RAYA UMUM DEWAN UNDANGAN NEGERI SABAH BAGI TAHUN 2004".

Sabah state election, 1999: Moyog
Party	Candidate	Votes	%	∆%
PBS	Clarence Bongkos	10,870	60.97	▲4.60
BN	Bernard Giluk Dompok	6,482	36.36	▲24.05
BERSEKUTU	Benedict Mansul	285	1.60	N/A
Independent	Conrad Mojuntin	59	0.33	N/A
Independent	Ignatius Matayun	20	0.11	N/A
PASOK	Cleftus Mojingol	18	0.10	N/A
Total valid votes		17,734	99.47	
Total rejected ballots		95	0.53	
Unreturned ballots		0	0.00	
Turnout		17,829	78.83	
Registered electors		22,616		
Majority		4,388		
PBS hold		Swing		▲14.33
Source(s) "KEPUTUSAN PILIHAN RAYA UMUM DEWAN UNDANGAN NEGERI SABAH BAGI TAHUN 1999".

Sabah state election, 1994: Moyog
Party	Candidate	Votes	%	∆%
PBS	Bernard Giluk Dompok	6,615	56.37	▼23.61
Independent	Clarence Bongkos	3,360	28.63	N/A
BN	Edwin Richard	1,445	12.31	N/A
Independent	Loh Chien Cheng	25	0.21	N/A
SETIA	Ibus Molikun	19	0.16	N/A
Total valid votes		11,464	97.70	
Total rejected ballots		270	2.30	
Unreturned ballots		0	0.00	
Turnout		11,734	82.39	
Registered electors		14,242		
Majority		3,255		
PBS hold		Swing		N/A
Source(s) "KEPUTUSAN PILIHAN RAYA UMUM DEWAN UNDANGAN NEGERI SABAH BAGI TAHUN 1994".

Sabah state election, 1990: Moyog
Party	Candidate	Votes	%	∆%
PBS	Bernard Giluk Dompok	7,846	79.98	▼11.62
BERJAYA	Bryan Matasim Lojingon	733	7.47	▼0.14
AKAR	Lawrence Sinsua	589	6.00	N/A
Independent	Peter Martin Tojipun	365	3.72	N/A
Sabah People's Party	Bernard Joseph Bai	132	1.35	N/A
Total valid votes		9,665	98.52	
Total rejected ballots		145	1.48	
Unreturned ballots		0	0.00	
Turnout		9,810	78.94	
Registered electors		12,427		
Majority		7,113		
PBS hold		Swing		▼5.88
Source(s) "KEPUTUSAN PILIHAN RAYA UMUM DEWAN UNDANGAN NEGERI SABAH BAGI TAHUN 1990".

Sabah state election, 1986: Moyog
Party	Candidate	Votes	%	∆%
PBS	Bernard Giluk Dompok	6,714	92.33	▲92.33
BERJAYA	Bryan Matasim Lojingon	558	7.67	▲7.67
Total valid votes		7,272	100.00	
Total rejected ballots		58		
Unreturned ballots		0		
Turnout		7,330	77.13	▲0.62
Registered electors		9,504		
Majority		6,156	84.65	▲15.72
PBS gain from PASOK		Swing		?
Source(s) "KEPUTUSAN PILIHAN RAYA UMUM DEWAN UNDANGAN NEGERI SABAH BAGI TAHUN 1986".

Sabah state election, 1985: Moyog
Party	Candidate	Votes	%	∆%
PASOK	Ignatius Stephen Malanjum	5,067	84.46	▲52.60
BERJAYA	Conrad Jomilon Mojuntin	932	15.54	▼52.60
Total valid votes		5,999	100.00	
Total rejected ballots		82		
Unreturned ballots		0		
Turnout		6,081	76.51	▼2.72
Registered electors		7,948		
Majority		4,135	68.93	▲32.65
PASOK gain from BN		Swing		-

Sabah state election, 1981: Moyog
Party	Candidate	Votes	%	∆%
BERJAYA	Conrad Jomilon Mojuntin	3,664	68.14	▼26.52
PASOK	Ignatius Stephen Malanjum	1,713	31.86	▲31.86
Total valid votes		5,377	100.00	
Total rejected ballots		77		
Unreturned ballots		0		
Turnout		5,454	79.23	▲5.99
Registered electors		6,884		
Majority		1,951	36.28	▼53.04
BN gain from BERJAYA		Swing		-

Sabah state election, 31 July 1976: Moyog
Party	Candidate	Votes	%	∆%
BERJAYA	Conrad Jomilon Mojuntin	4,202	94.66	▲7.80
Independent	Richard E. Yapp	237	5.34	▲5.34
Total valid votes		4,439	100.00	
Total rejected ballots		67		
Unreturned ballots		0		
Turnout		4,506	73.23	▼11.68
Registered electors		6,153		
Majority		3,965	89.32	▲15.59
BERJAYA hold		Swing		

Sabah state election, 1976: Moyog
Party	Candidate	Votes	%	
BERJAYA	Peter Joinod Mojuntin	4,020	86.86	
USNO	Joseph Lanjuat	608	13.14	
Total valid votes		4,628	100.00	
Total rejected ballots		128		
Unreturned ballots		0		
Turnout		4,756	84.91	
Registered electors		5,601		
Majority		3,412	73.73	
BERJAYA gain from Alliance		Swing		-

Sabah state election, 1971: Moyog
Party	Candidate	Votes	%
On the nomination day, Peter Joinod Mojuntin won uncontested.
USNO	Peter Joinod Mojuntin		
Total valid votes			
Total rejected ballots			
Unreturned ballots			
Turnout			
Registered electors		0	
Majority			
USNO hold		Swing	

Sabah state election, 1967: Moyog
Party	Candidate	Votes	%
UPKO	Peter Joinod Mojuntin	6,908	76.24
USNO	Alex Ng	2,089	23.05
Independent	Chin Kui Sai	64	0.71
Total valid votes		9,061	100.00
Total rejected ballots		187	
Unreturned ballots		0	
Turnout		9,248	90.49
Registered electors		10,220	
Majority		4,819	53.18
This was a new constituency created
