= Sabah National Momogun Party =

Sabah National Momogun Party Parti Momogun Kebangsaan Sabah MOMOGUN
- Abbreviation: MOMOGUN
- Founded: August 1985
- Dissolved: Defunct
- Preceded by: Parti Momogun Kebangsaan Malaysia (Malaysia National Momogun Party)
- Headquarters: Kota Kinabalu, Sabah

Website
- Facebook Parti Momogun Kebangsaan Sabah

Sabah National Momogun Party or Malay: Parti Momogun Kebangsaan Sabah (MOMOGUN) was a Kadazan-based party in Sabah, Malaysia that was initially formed as Malaysian National Momogun Party (Malay: Parti Momogun Kebangsaan Malaysia) in August 1985. MOMOGUN contested only once, in Malaysian general election, 1986. It later changed its name to Parti Momogun Kebangsaan Sabah (Sabah National Momogun Party). MOMOGUN has since become dormant

== General election results ==
Election	Total seats won	Seats contested	Total votes	Voting Percentage	Outcome of election	Election leader
1986	0 / 177	2	0	0	; No representation in Parliament	N/A

=== State election results ===
Sabah State Legislative Assembly
Election	Votes		Seats			Position	Status
Election	Count	%	Result	Won / contested	+/–	Position	Status
1986	Did not contest						No seats

== See also ==
- Politics of Malaysia
- List of political parties in Malaysia
