= Penampang =

Penampang Majlis Perbandaran Penampang
- Big Town and district capital
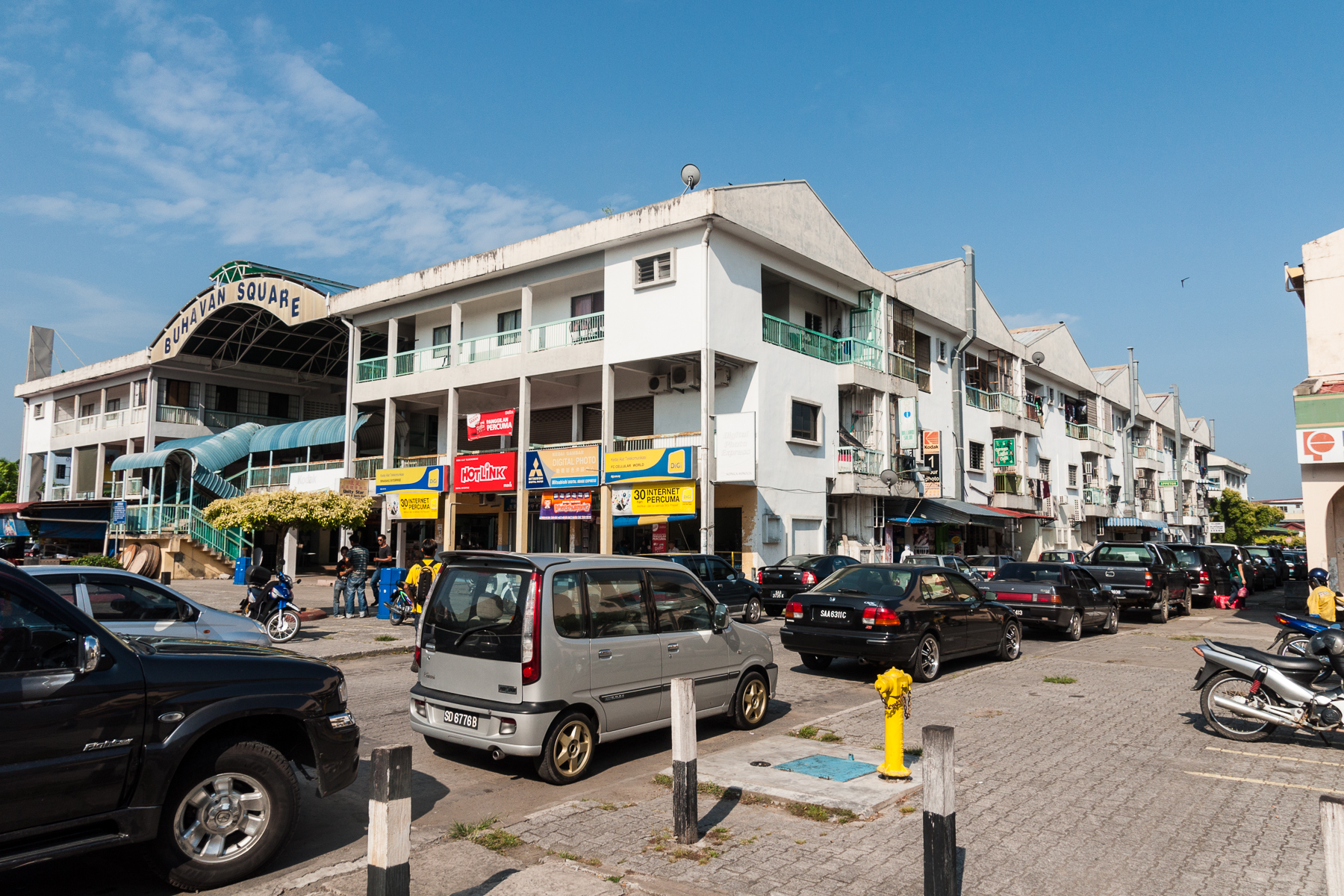
- Penampang town centre.

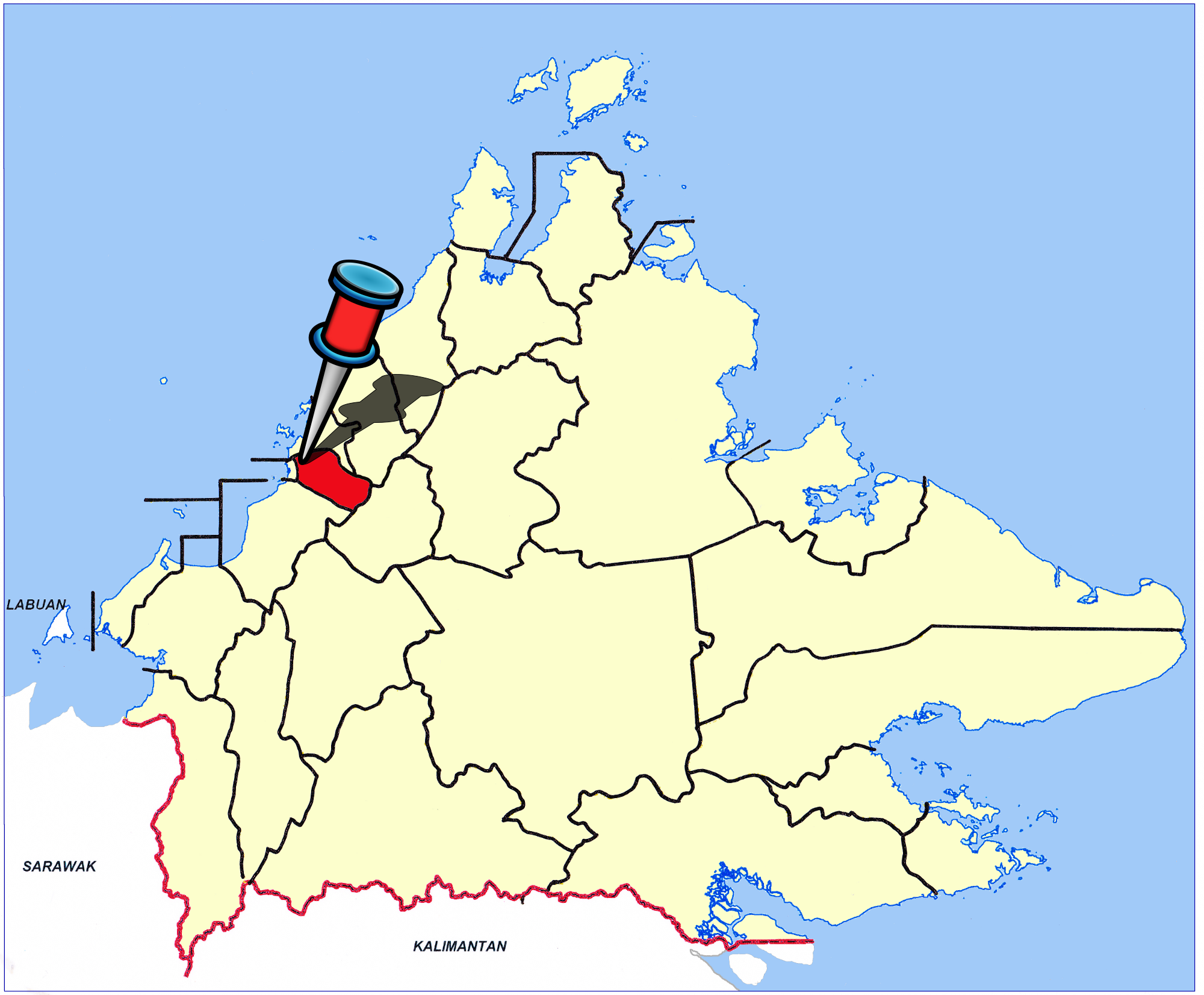
- Coordinates: 5°55′00″N 116°07′00″E
- Country: Malaysia
- State: Sabah
- Division: West Coast
- District: Penampang

Population (2010)
  - Total: 93,616

Penampang (Malay: Pekan Penampang) is the capital of the Penampang District in the West Coast Division of Sabah, Malaysia. Its population was estimated to be around 93,616 in 2010, with ethnic Kadazan as the majority. It contains, or is synonymous with, Donggongon, which as of 2007, had a population of 78,086. It was also considered as the sixth-largest town in Sabah.

Penampang has virtually become a suburb of Kota Kinabalu and considered as part of the Greater Kota Kinabalu area.

== Etymology ==
The name Penampang came from an old village within the district. The village's name in turn originates from a Kadazan word, pampang, meaning a big rock. Huge rocks were easily found within the vicinity of the village a long time ago. The name in contemporary usage refers to the district, with the town of Donggongon as the main town within the district of Penampang. The name Donggongon originates from the Kadazan word tundo'ongon, which means a 'shelter' or a 'resting area', referring to its historical role as a stop-over for people from the interior who journeyed down the coast to trade. Penampang as a name reference of this area is of a relatively new origin. Early British explorer, John Whitehead, who had explored North Borneo in the 1880s, referred to this district as Patatan. Owen Rutter, a civil servant in North Borneo from 1910 to 1914, similarly referred to this area as Putatan.

== Economy ==
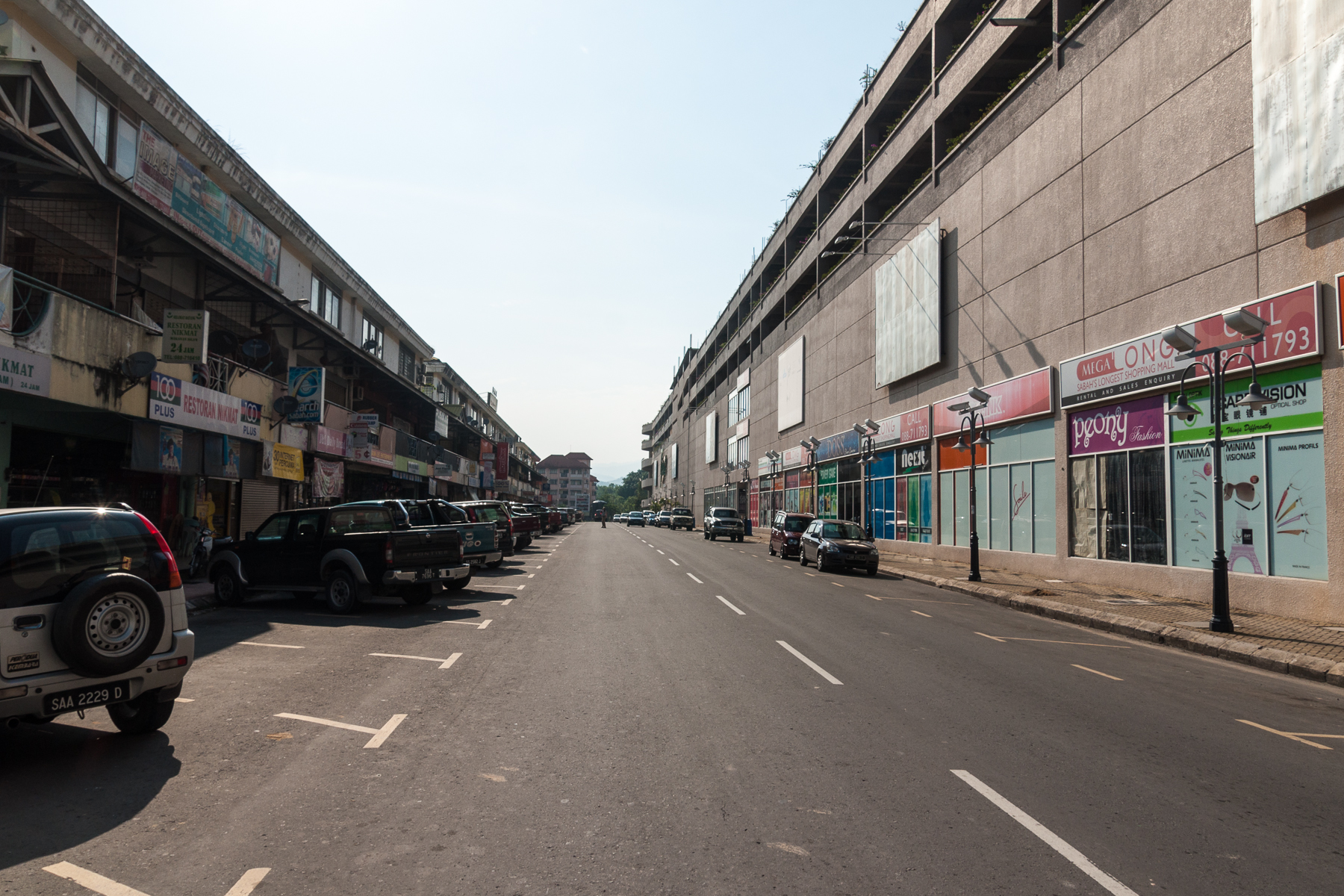
Mega Long Mall, Donggongon.

Penampang is one of the major industrial and commercial centres within the Greater Kota Kinabalu area. Many retail stores are found scattered in the district, primarily in the Donggongon area, anywhere along the Penampang Lama Road and the Penampang–KK Bypass Road. The Mega Long Mall is a shopping centre situated in Donggongon, with many retail shops such as the Wisma Chua Kah Seng, cinema, restaurants and others. A second shopping centre, the ITCC Mall, is located at the Penampang–KK Bypass Road, which would consist of a hotel, office space, shopping mall and a multi-purpose commercial centre.

The Penampang District Police Headquarters, Penampang District Library, and the Penampang Sports Complex are located in Donggongon. It also features a popular weekly tamu (market) in the town every Thursday and Friday, where the market sells a variety of households products, foods, and traditional handicrafts such as bangles, headbands or gongs. Mega Long Mall also located in the town together with a number of restaurants, pubs and karaoke bars. The Chua Ka Seng supermarket made its presence felt before the Megalong Mall was built. ITCC, a shopping complex is now open for shoppers. Shop owners from the razed Kasiigui had moved to Donggongon. This happened decades ago.
