= Secretary of the House of Representatives of Malaysia =

- Setiausaha Dewan Rakyat
- Incumbent; Nizam Mydin Bacha Mydin since 14 May 2020
- House of Representatives of Malaysia
- Member of: Parliament of Malaysia
- Reports to: Speaker of the House of Representatives of Malaysia
- Seat: Malaysian Houses of Parliament, Federal Territory of Kuala Lumpur, Malaysia
- Appointer: King of Malaysia
- Constituting instrument: Constitution of Malaysia
- Formation: 11 September 1959
- First holder: C. A. Fredericks
- Website: www.parlimen.gov.my

The secretary of the House of Representatives of Malaysia (Malay: Setiausaha Dewan Rakyat; Chinese: 馬來西亞國會下議院秘書; Tamil: மலேசிய நாடாளுமன்றத்தின் பொது மன்றத்தின் செயலாளர்) SUDR is the chief clerk of the House of Representatives of Malaysia.

== Constitutional basis ==
The office of Secretary of the House of Representatives of Malaysia is established under Article 65 of the Constitution of Malaysia, which establishes the SUDR together with that of Secretary of the Senate of Malaysia (SUDN) as may be appointed by the Yang di-Pertuan Agong (King of Malaysia).

Clause (5) of Article 65 provides that the SUDR cannot be an individual elected as either a Member of Parliament (MP) or a Member of Legislative Assembly (MLA). Clause (2) of Article 65 sets out for the office-bearer to hold office only until the age of 60. Article 125 stipulated that any removal of the SUDR outside of the incumbent's voluntary resignation can only be executed following the decision made by a tribunal appointed by the Yang di-Pertuan Agong having received the advice to do so from the Prime Minister of Malaysia.

== Roles ==
The secretary of the House of Representatives is responsible for the proceedings of the House and assists the Speaker on matters regarding the House during these proceedings.

The duties also include sending out notices for commencement of meetings, collecting proposals, articles, Order Paper, votes and written enquiries from Members of the House and producing verbatim reports of proceedings.

== List of secretaries of the House of Representatives (1959–present) ==
Parliament	No.	Office bearer	Term of office		Duration	Speaker
1st 1959–1964	1	C. A. Fredericks; AMN	1959	1964	4–5 years	Mohamed Noah Omar
2nd 1964–1969	2	Tan Sri; Sheikh Abdullah Sheikh Abu Bakar; PSM JMN PPM	1964	1965	0–1 year	Syed Esa Alwee
2nd 1964–1969	2	Tan Sri; Sheikh Abdullah Sheikh Abu Bakar; PSM JMN PPM	1964	1965	0–1 year	Chik Mohamed Yusuf Sheikh Abdul Rahman
2nd 1964–1969	3	Haji; Shamsuddin Mohamed Sidin; AMN	1965	1967	1–2 years	Chik Mohamed Yusuf Sheikh Abdul Rahman
2nd 1964–1969	4	Jaafar Mohd. Taha	1967	1969	1–2 years	Chik Mohamed Yusuf Sheikh Abdul Rahman
3rd 1971–1974	5	Dato'; Ahmad Abdullah; DPMJ	1969	1972	2–3 years	Chik Mohamed Yusuf Sheikh Abdul Rahman
3rd 1971–1974	6	Dato'; Azizul Rahman Abdul Aziz; DPMP JMN SMP	1972	1988	15–16 years	Chik Mohamed Yusuf Sheikh Abdul Rahman
4th 1974–1978	6	Dato'; Azizul Rahman Abdul Aziz; DPMP JMN SMP	1972	1988	15–16 years	Nik Ahmad Kamil Nik Mahmood
5th 1978–1982	6	Dato'; Azizul Rahman Abdul Aziz; DPMP JMN SMP	1972	1988	15–16 years	Syed Nasir Ismail
6th 1982–1986	6	Dato'; Azizul Rahman Abdul Aziz; DPMP JMN SMP	1972	1988	15–16 years	Mohamed Zahir Ismail
7th 1986–1990	6	Dato'; Azizul Rahman Abdul Aziz; DPMP JMN SMP	1972	1988	15–16 years	Mohamed Zahir Ismail
7th 1986–1990	7	Dato'; Wan Zahir Sheikh Abdul Rahman; DPMP JSM	1988	1993	4–5 years	Mohamed Zahir Ismail
8th 1990–1995	7	Dato'; Wan Zahir Sheikh Abdul Rahman; DPMP JSM	1988	1993	4–5 years	Mohamed Zahir Ismail
8th 1990–1995	8	Datuk Haji; Abdul Rahman Ali; PSD DPMT	1993	1998	4–5 years	Mohamed Zahir Ismail
9th 1995–1999	8	Datuk Haji; Abdul Rahman Ali; PSD DPMT	1993	1998	4–5 years	Mohamed Zahir Ismail
9th 1995–1999	9	Datuk; Mohd. Salleh Hassan; JSD AMN	1998	6 January 2004	5–6 years	Mohamed Zahir Ismail
10th 1999–2004	9	Datuk; Mohd. Salleh Hassan; JSD AMN	1998	6 January 2004	5–6 years	Mohamed Zahir Ismail
11th 2004–2008	10	Datuk; Abdullah Abdul Wahab; PJN DPSJ KMN AMN PPN	7 January 2004	15 August 2006	2 years, 7 months	Mohamed Zahir Ismail
11th 2004–2008	10	Datuk; Abdullah Abdul Wahab; PJN DPSJ KMN AMN PPN	7 January 2004	15 August 2006	2 years, 7 months	Ramli Ngah Talib
11th 2004–2008	11	Tan Sri Dato' Sri; Mahmood Adam; PSM PNBS SSAP DMSM JSM KMN AMN	11 September 2006	20 December 2007	1 year, 3 months	Ramli Ngah Talib
11th 2004–2008	12	Datuk; Roosme Hamzah; PMW KMN AMN	26 December 2007	22 February 2020	12 years, 1 month	Ramli Ngah Talib
12th 2008–2013	12	Datuk; Roosme Hamzah; PMW KMN AMN	26 December 2007	22 February 2020	12 years, 1 month	Pandikar Amin Mulia
13th 2013–2018	12	Datuk; Roosme Hamzah; PMW KMN AMN	26 December 2007	22 February 2020	12 years, 1 month	Mohamad Ariff Md Yusof
14th 2018–2022	12	Datuk; Roosme Hamzah; PMW KMN AMN	26 December 2007	22 February 2020	12 years, 1 month	Mohamad Ariff Md Yusof
14th 2018–2022	13	Riduan Rahmat; AMN	22 February 2020	13 May 2020	2 months	Mohamad Ariff Md Yusof
14th 2018–2022	14	Dr. Nizam Mydin Bacha Mydin	14 May 2020	Incumbent	6 years, 3 months	Mohamad Ariff Md Yusof
14th 2018–2022	14	Dr. Nizam Mydin Bacha Mydin	14 May 2020	Incumbent	6 years, 3 months	Azhar Azizan Harun
15th 2022–Incumbent	14	Dr. Nizam Mydin Bacha Mydin	14 May 2020	Incumbent	6 years, 3 months	Johari Abdul

== Controversy ==
In mid-May 2020, Riduan Rahmat's removal as SUDR led to an uproar especially amongst opposition lawmakers who challenged the constitutionality of his removal. He was re-assigned as the management division secretary of the Dewan Negara (Senate of Malaysia) which is one-rung lower in seniority than that of the SUDR. This was despite Rahmat being the senior-most parliamentary service servant having served since 1989. According to Articles 65 (3) and 125 (3) of the Constitution of Malaysia respectively, the SUDR can only be removed from office by a tribunal appointed by the Yang di-Pertuan Agong. Speculation was rife that Rahmat's removal was triggered by allegations that he was attempting to not reveal the motion of no confidence filed by former prime minister Mahathir Mohamad against the incumbent Muhyiddin Muhammad Yassin. Following his controversial dismissal, Rahmat leaves as having the shortest tenure as SUDR. Subsequently, the National Alliance (PN) governing coalition that wrested power from the Alliance of Hope (PH) in the 2020 Malaysian constitutional crisis removed the no-confidence vote from the agenda and altered the parliament sitting to consist of only the speech by the Yang di-Pertuan Agong.

== See also ==
- Speaker of the Dewan Rakyat
