= Deputy Speaker of the Dewan Rakyat =

Presiding officer of the Malaysian lower house of Parliament

- Timbalan Yang di-Pertua Dewan Rakyat
- Incumbent; Ramli Mohd Nor; Alice Lau Kiong Yieng since 19 December 2022
- Dewan Rakyat
- Style: Yang Berhormat; Tuan Yang di-Pertua (formal); Tuan Speaker/Tuan Pengurusi (informal and within the House)
- Reports to: Dewan Rakyat
- Appointer: Elected by members of the Dewan Rakyat
- Term length: Elected at the start of each Parliament, upon a vacancy
- Constituting instrument: Federal Constitution of Malaysia
- Inaugural holder: Syed Esa Alwee
- Formation: 24 November 1964; 61 years ago
- Salary: MYR 372,000 annually
- Website: Parliament of Malaysia

The Deputy Speaker of the Dewan Rakyat (Malay: Timbalan Yang di-Pertua Dewan Rakyat) is the second highest-ranking presiding officer of the Dewan Rakyat, the lower house of the Parliament of Malaysia. They are responsible for convening sessions of the Dewan Rakyat, organising debates, and examining the admissibility of petitions, bills, and amendments. One of their deputies will take their place when in the absence of the Speaker.

The current deputy speaker is Ramli Mohd Nor alongside Alice Lau Kiong Yieng. They were elected on 19 December 2022 for the 15th Malaysian Parliament.

== Functions ==
The Deputy Speaker determines when a sitting of the House should open and close, and may suspend the sitting for a brief period of time if necessary. He is also in charge of ensuring the Constitution and Standing Orders of the House are given due respect; disciplining members of the House; determining who shall have the floor during a sitting; calling a vote; and checking for a quorum when the House meets. He only participates in a vote when there is a tie. The Deputy Speaker also has powers some allege to be excessive, such as imposing limits on the posing of supplementary questions during Question Time — an important procedure for the legislature to examine the government's actions — the power to restrict the tabling of questions for Question Time, and the power to amend written copies of speeches made by members of the House before they are given verbally.

== Deputy Speaker election ==
The Deputy Speaker is elected to a term that lasts for the length of the term of the Dewan Rakyat that elected him. His term ends when the House is dissolved and a general election is called. He is elected when the House meets for the first time after a general election by the members of the House, who are called MPs. Any MP is qualified to be the Deputy Speaker of the House, but non-MPs who meet the same qualifications required to be an MP are also eligible for election as Deputy Speaker. A candidate for Deputy Speaker must be nominated and seconded by at least two MPs other than himself. This nomination process must be conducted at least 14 days before the election of the Speaker. If only one candidate meets these conditions, he is automatically elected Speaker; otherwise, voting by secret ballot is conducted, with the winner decided by a simple majority. Two deputy Speakers are elected in a similar manner.

The Secretary (Malay:Setiausaha) of the House presides over the voting.

== List of deputy speakers of the Dewan Rakyat ==
The Dewan Rakyat (House of Representatives) shall be from time to time elect two deputy speakers from among members of the House. During any vacancy in the office of Speaker or during any absence of the Speaker from any sitting, one of the Deputy Speakers or, if both the Deputy Speakers are absent or if both their offices are vacant, such other member as may be determined by the rules of procedure of the House, shall act as Speaker.

As 7 September 2026 has 19 deputy speakers being elected, the list following:

No.	Portrait	Name (Birth–Death) (Constituency)	Term of office			Party	Parliament
No.	Portrait	Name (Birth–Death) (Constituency)	Took office	Left office	Time in office	Party	Parliament
1		Syed Esa Alwee; MP for Batu Pahat Dalam	24 November 1964	20 March 1969	4 years, 117 days	Alliance (UMNO)	2nd
2		Tan Sri Datuk Haji; Nik Ahmad Kamil (1909–1977); MP for Ulu Kelantan	9 March 1971	31 July 1974	3 years, 145 days	Alliance (UMNO)	3rd
3		Tan Sri; Syed Nasir Ismail (1921–1982); MP for Pagoh	6 November 1974	8 January 1978	3 years, 64 days	BN (UMNO)	4th
4		Azahari Md. Taib; MP for Kulim-Bandar Baharu	21 March 1978	12 June 1978	84 days	BN (UMNO)	4th
5		Datuk; Mansor Othman; MP for Kuala Pilah	23 October 1978	29 March 1982	3 years, 158 days	BN (UMNO)	5th
6		Dato' Dr. Hee Tien Lai (1941–2016); MP for Ayer Hitam	14 June 1982	26 July 1983	1 year, 43 days	BN (MCA)	6th
7		Dr. Abdul Hamid Pawanteh (1944–2022); MP for Arau	26 October 1984	18 July 1986	1 year, 266 days	BN (UMNO)	–
8		D. P. Vijandran; MP for Kapar	8 October 1986	23 February 1990	3 years, 139 days	BN (MIC)	7th
8		Mohamed Amin Daud; MP for Rompin	8 October 1986	4 October 1990	3 years, 362 days	BN (UMNO)	7th
9		Ong Tee Keat (born 1956); MP for Ampang Jaya	11 June 1990	10 November 1999	9 years, 153 days	BN (MCA)	–
9		Ong Tee Keat (born 1956); MP for Ampang Jaya	11 June 1990	10 November 1999	9 years, 153 days	BN (MCA)	8th
9		Ong Tee Keat (born 1956); MP for Ampang Jaya	11 June 1990	10 November 1999	9 years, 153 days	BN (MCA)	9th
9		Datuk Haji; Juhar Mahiruddin (born 1953); MP for Kinabatangan	5 December 1990	10 November 1999	8 years, 341 days	BN (UMNO)	
9		Datuk Haji; Juhar Mahiruddin (born 1953); MP for Kinabatangan	5 December 1990	10 November 1999	8 years, 341 days	BN (UMNO)	8th
9		Datuk Haji; Juhar Mahiruddin (born 1953); MP for Kinabatangan	5 December 1990	10 November 1999	8 years, 341 days	BN (UMNO)	9th
10		Datuk; Lim Si Cheng (born 1949); MP for Senai (1995–2004)	20 December 1999	4 March 2004	4 years, 76 days	BN (MCA)	10th
10		Datuk; Muhammad Abdullah (born 1942); MP for Maran	20 December 1999	4 March 2004	4 years, 76 days	BN (UMNO)	10th
11		Datuk; Lim Si Cheng (born 1949); MP for Kulai (2004–2008)	17 May 2004	12 February 2008	3 years, 272 days	BN (MCA)	11th
11		Datuk Dr. Haji; Yusof Yacob (born 1956); MP for Sipitang	17 May 2004	12 February 2008	3 years, 272 days	BN (UMNO)	11th
15		Datuk Dr. Wan Junaidi Tuanku Jaafar (born 1946); MP for Santubong	28 April 2008	3 April 2013	4 years, 341 days	BN (PBB)	12th
15		Datuk Dr. Ronald Kiandee (born 1961); MP for Beluran	28 April 2008	3 April 2013	4 years, 341 days	BN (UMNO)	12th
16		Datuk Seri Dr. Ronald Kiandee (born 1961); MP for Beluran	24 June 2013	7 April 2018	4 years, 288 days	BN (UMNO)	13th
16		Dato' Sri Dr. Haji; Ismail Mohamed Said (born 1965); MP for Kuala Krau	24 June 2013	7 April 2018	4 years, 288 days	BN (UMNO)	13th
17		Dato'; Mohd Rashid Hasnon (born 1960); MP for Batu Pahat	16 July 2018	10 October 2022	4 years, 87 days	PH (PKR)	14th
17		Dato'; Mohd Rashid Hasnon (born 1960); MP for Batu Pahat	16 July 2018	10 October 2022	4 years, 87 days	PN (BERSATU)	14th
17		Nga Kor Ming (born 1972); MP for Teluk Intan	16 July 2018	13 July 2020	1 year, 364 days	PH (DAP)	14th
18		Dato' Sri; Azalina Othman Said (born 1963); MP for Pengerang	13 July 2020	23 August 2021	1 year, 42 days	BN (UMNO)	–
19		Dato' Dr. Ramli Mohd Nor (born 1958); MP for Cameron Highlands	19 December 2022	Incumbent	3 years, 263 days	BN (UMNO)	15th
19		Alice Lau Kiong Yieng (born 1981); MP for Lanang	19 December 2022	Incumbent	3 years, 263 days	PH (DAP)	15th

=== Election results ===
Election Date	Candidates	Votes	Nominated by	Seconded by
25 November 1964	Syed Esa Alwee	Unopposed	Ismail Abdul Rahman	T. Mahima Singh
9 March 1971	Nik Ahmad Kamil Nik Mahmud	Unopposed	Tunku Abdul Rahman	Ismail Abdul Rahman
6 November 1974	Syed Nasir Ismail	Unopposed	Abdul Razak Hussein	Hussein Onn
21 March 1978	Azahari Md. Taib	Unopposed	Hussein Onn	V. Manickavasagam
23 October 1978	Mansor Othman	Unopposed	Hussein Onn	V. Manickavasagam
14 June 1982	Hee Tien Lai	Unopposed	Mahathir Mohamad	Samy Vellu
26 October 1984	Abdul Hamid Pawanteh	Unopposed	Mahathir Mohamad	Sulaiman Daud
8 October 1986	Mohamed Amin Daud	Unopposed	Mahathir Mohamad	Samy Vellu
8 October 1986	D. P. Vijandran	Unopposed	Mahathir Mohamad	Lim Keng Yaik
11 June 1990	Ong Tee Keat	107	Mahathir Mohamad	Samy Vellu
11 June 1990	Chian Heng Kai	30	Rais Yatim	Lee Lam Thye
5 December 1990	Ong Tee Keat	Unopposed	Mahathir Mohamad	Samy Vellu
5 December 1990	Juhar Mahiruddin	Unopposed	Mahathir Mohamad	Ling Liong Sik
12 June 1995	Ong Tee Keat	Unopposed	Abang Abu Bakar Abang Mustapha	Samy Vellu
12 June 1995	Juhar Mahiruddin	Unopposed	Anwar Ibrahim	Lim Keng Yaik
20 December 1999	Lim Si Cheng	Unopposed	Mahathir Mohamad	Samy Vellu
20 December 1999	Muhammad Abdullah	Unopposed	Mahathir Mohamad	Samy Vellu
17 May 2004	Lim Si Cheng	Unopposed	Abdullah Ahmad Badawi	Ong Ka Ting
17 May 2004	Yusof Yacob	Unopposed	Abdullah Ahmad Badawi	Ong Ka Ting
28 April 2008	Wan Junaidi Tuanku Jaafar	157	Abdullah Ahmad Badawi	Najib Razak
28 April 2008	Ronald Kiandee	140	Abdullah Ahmad Badawi	Najib Razak
28 April 2008	Tan Seng Giaw	81	Lim Kit Siang	Karpal Singh
24 June 2013	Ronald Kiandee	Unopposed	Najib Razak	Muhyiddin Yassin
24 June 2013	Ismail Mohamed Said	Unopposed	Najib Razak	Muhyiddin Yassin
16 July 2018	Mohd Rashid Hasnon	171	Mahathir Mohamad	Wan Azizah Wan Ismail
16 July 2018	Nga Kor Ming	124	Mahathir Mohamad	Wan Azizah Wan Ismail
16 July 2018	Ronald Kiandee	93	Ahmad Zahid Hamidi	Azalina Othman Said
13 July 2020	Azalina Othman Said	Unopposed	Muhyiddin Yassin	Mohamed Azmin Ali
19 December 2022	Ramli Mohd Nor	148	Anwar Ibrahim	Fadillah Yusof
19 December 2022	Alice Lau Kiong Yieng	146	Anwar Ibrahim	Fadillah Yusof
19 December 2022	Mas Ermieyati Samsudin	74	Takiyuddin Hassan	Ahmad Amzad Mohamed @ Hashim

== See also ==
- Dewan Rakyat
- Parliament of Malaysia
- Deputy President of the Dewan Negara
