= Members of the Dewan Rakyat, 10th Malaysian Parliament =

10th Parliament of Malaysia
←	9th Parliament	11th Parliament	→

Overview
- Legislative body: Parliament of Malaysia
- Jurisdiction: Malaysia
- Meeting place: Malaysian Houses of Parliament
- Term: 20 December 1999 – 4 March 2004
- Election: 1999 general election
- Government: Sixth Mahathir cabinet (until 31 October 2003); First Abdullah cabinet
- Website: www.parlimen.gov.my

Dewan Rakyat
- Members: 193
- Speaker: Mohamed Zahir Ismail
- Deputy Speaker: Muhammad Abdullah; Lim Si Cheng
- Secretary: Mohd Salleh Hassan (until 6 January 2004); Abdullah Abdul Wahab
- Prime Minister: Mahathir Mohamad (until 31 October 2003); Abdullah Ahmad Badawi
- Leader of the Opposition: Fadzil Noor (until 23 July 2002); Abdul Hadi Awang
- Party control: Barisan Nasional

Sovereign
- Yang di-Pertuan Agong: Tuanku Salahuddin Abdul Aziz Shah (until 21 November 2001); Tuanku Syed Sirajuddin

Sessions
- 1st: 20 December 1999 – 23 December 1999
- 2nd: 14 February 2000 – 14 December 2000
- 3rd: 19 March 2001 – 11 December 2001
- 4th: 11 March 2002 – 12 November 2002
- 5th: 10 March 2003 – 11 November 2003

This is a list of the members of the Dewan Rakyat (House of Representatives) of the 10th Parliament of Malaysia, elected in 1999.

== Composition ==
State	# of Seats	UMNO Seats	MCA Seats	MIC Seats	PAS Seats	Gerakan Seats	PPP Seats	DAP Seats	KeADILan Seats	PRM Seats	AKIM Seats	PBS Seats	LDP Seats	UPKO Seats	SAPP Seats	PBB Seats	PBDS Seats	SNAP Seats	SUPP Seats	PBRS Seats	AKAR Seats	STAR Seats	MDP Seats	BERJASA Seats	IND Seats
Perlis	3	3																							
Kedah	15	5	2		8																				
Kelantan	14	1			10				3																
Terengganu	8				7				1																
Penang	11	3	1			2		4	1																
Perak	23	9	6	2	2	3		1																	
Pahang	11	8	3																						
Selangor	17	8	6	3																					
Federal Territory of Kuala Lumpur	10	3	1			2		4																	
Negeri Sembilan	7	4	2	1																					
Malacca	5	3	1					1																	
Johor	20	13	6	1																					
Federal Territory of Labuan	1	1																							
Sabah	20	11										3	1	3	2										
Sarawak	28															11	6	4	7						
Seats won	193	71	29	7	27	6	0	10	5	0	0	3	1	3	2	11	6	4	7	0	0	0	0	0	0
Seats contested																									

== Seating arrangement ==
This is the seating arrangement as of its last meeting on 11 November 2003. In addition, there were a seat that is labelled as VACANT, namely Kangar. The seat vacancy is due to the resignation of the incumbent Member of Parliament (MP) for the constituency to assume his new post as Senate president, which occur on 3 July 2003 respectively.

P188 Kapit	P162 Kinabatangan	P053 Larut	P098 Shah Alam	P151 Tanjong Aru	P061 Ipoh Timor	P093 Hulu Langat	P120 Alor Gajah		P060 Tambun	P068 Kampar	P075 Lipis	P176 Sri Aman	P177 Lubok Antu	P187 Selangau	P173 Serian	P189 Hulu Rajang
P193 Bukit Mas		P073 Telok Intan	P149 Tuaran	P140 Tebrau	P089 Kuala Selangor	P097 Subang	P131 Parit Sulong		P146 Marudu	P175 Batang Lupar	P011 Pendang	P137 Sungai Benut	P179 Saratok	P074 Tanjong Malim		P184 Lanang
P190 Bintulu	P134 Sri Gading			P192 Baram	P155 Sipitang	P130 Kluang	P017 Padang Serai		P091 Gombak	P148 Kota Belud	P122 Batu Berendam	P014 Merbok			P067 Gopeng	P185 Sibu
P160 Libaran	P163 Silam		P161 Sandakan			P072 Bagan Datok	P006 Kubang Pasu		P168 Petra Jaya	P153 Papar			P128 Labis		P056 Bukit Gantang	P169 Bandar Kuching
P182 Julau	P115 Tampin	P143 Gelang Patah			P157 Keningau						P171 Kota Samarahan			P104 Batu	P062 Ipoh Barat (Parliamentary Secretary)	P015 Sungai Petani (Parliamentary Secretary)
P172 Mambong	P135 Batu Pahat	P002 Kangar (Vacant)		P096 Serdang				Sergeant-at-Arm				P032 Gua Musang		P170 Stampin (Parliamentary Secretary)	P158 Tenom (Parliamentary Secretary)	P069 Tapah (Parliamentary Secretary)
P165 Tawau	P142 Pulai	P150 Gaya	P116 Kuala Pilah			D				C			P119 Telok Kemang (Parliamentary Secretary)	P126 Ledang (Parliamentary Secretary)	P050 Bayan Baru (Parliamentary Secretary)	P003 Arau (Parliamentary Secretary)
P152 Penampang	P145 Labuan	P102 Sepang	P174 Batang Sadong										P047 Bukit Bendera (Parliamentary Secretary)	P124 Jasin (Parliamentary Secretary)	P133 Muar (Parliamentary Secretary)	P167 Santubong (Parliamentary Secretary)
P084 Temerloh	P051 Balik Pulau	P118 Rasah	P100 Klang	E								B	P125 Segamat (Deputy Minister)	P042 Tasek Gelugor (Deputy Minister)	P076 Raub (Deputy Minister)	P052 Gerik (Parliamentary Secretary)
P071 Lumut	P049 Jelutong	P147 Bandau	P159 Beluran	E								B	P057 Taiping (Deputy Minister)	P070 Pasir Salak (Deputy Minister)	P166 Mas Gading (Deputy Minister)	P087 Tanjong Karang (Parliamentary Secretary)
P083 Bentong	P105 Wangsa Maju	P094 Petaling Jaya Utara	P099 Kapar	E								B	P191 Miri (Deputy Minister)	P092 Ampang Jaya (Deputy Minister)	P106 Segambut (Deputy Minister)	P004 Langkawi (Parliamentary Secretary)
Vacant	Vacant	Vacant	Vacant	E								B	P107 Titiwangsa (Deputy Minister)	P088 Hulu Selangor (Deputy Minister)	P154 Beaufort (Deputy Minister)	P082 Mentakab (Deputy Minister)
Vacant	Vacant	Vacant	Vacant	E				the Mace				B	P114 Jempol (Deputy Minister)	P112 Bandar Tun Razak (Deputy Minister)	Senator (Deputy Minister)	Senator (Deputy Minister)
P026 Peringat	P027 Tanah Merah	P034 Setiu	P025 Bachok	E								B	P186 Mukah (Deputy Minister)	P009 Alor Star (Deputy Minister)	P077 Jerantut (Deputy Minister)	Senator (Deputy Minister)
P021 Kota Bharu	P040 Kemaman	P048 Tanjong	P043 Bagan	E								B	Senator (Minister)	P101 Kuala Langat (Deputy Minister)	P055 Bagan Serai (Deputy Minister)	P129 Mersing (Deputy Minister)
Vacant	P046 Nibong Tebal	P108 Bukit Bintang	P111 Cheras	E								B	Senator (Minister)	P178 Betong (Deputy Minister)	P086 Sabak Bernam (Deputy Minister)	P095 Petaling Jaya Selatan (Deputy Minister)
Vacant	P063 Batu Gajah	P110 Seputeh	P045 Bukit Mertajam	E								B	Senator (Minister)	P164 Semporna (Deputy Minister)	P141 Johor Bahru (Deputy Minister)	P117 Seremban (Deputy Minister)
P033 Besut	P028 Pasir Puteh	P019 Tumpat	P044 Permatang Pauh	F								A	P064 Kuala Kangsar (Minister)	P079 Paya Besar (Minister)	P156 Kinabalu (Minister)	P109 Lembah Pantai (Minister)
P038 Hulu Terengganu	P022 Pasir Mas	P013 Sik	P012 Yan	F								A	P183 Kanowit (Minister)	Senator (Minister)	P136 Tenggara (Minister)	P090 Selayang (Minister)
P030 Jeli	P035 Kuala Nerus	P024 Kubang Kerian	P054 Parit Buntar	F								A	P065 Beruas (Minister)	P132 Bakri (Minister)	P001 Padang Besar (Minister)	P085 Rompin (Minister)
P029 Machang	P016 Baling	P036 Kuala Terengganu	P123 Kota Melaka	F								A	P059 Sungai Siput (Minister)	P127 Pagoh (Minister)	P058 Chenderoh (Minister)	P180 Kuala Rajang (Minister)
P005 Jerlun	P007 Padang Terap	P010 Kuala Kedah	P103 Kepong	F								A	P144 Pontian (Minister)	P139 Kota Tinggi (Minister)	P121 Selandar (Minister)	P113 Jelebu (Minister)
P031 Kuala Krai	P020 Pengkalan Chepa	Vacant	P039 Dungun	F								A	Vacant (Deputy Prime Minister)	P181 Sarikei (Minister)	P018 Kulim–Bandar Baharu (Minister)	P138 Senai (Deputy Speaker)
P066 Parit	P023 Rantau Panjang	P008 Pokok Sena	P037 Marang (Opposition Leader)	F				Secretary				A	P041 Kepala Batas (Prime Minister)	P080 Pekan (Minister)	P078 Kuantan (Minister)	P081 Maran (Deputy Speaker)
								Speaker
								Yang Di-Pertuan Agong

== Elected members by state ==
Shortcut:

Perlis | Kedah | Kelantan | Terengganu | Pulau Pinang | Perak | Pahang | Selangor | Kuala Lumpur | Negeri Sembilan | Melaka | Johor | Labuan | Sabah | Sarawak

Unless noted otherwise, the MPs served the entire term of the parliament (from 20 December 1999 until 4 March 2004).

=== Perlis ===
No.	Federal Constituency	Member	Party
BN 2 | VAC 1
P001	Padang Besar	Azmi Khalid	BN (UMNO)
P002	Kangar	Vacant since 3 July 2003	VAC
P002	Kangar	Abdul Hamid Pawanteh until 3 July 2003	BN (UMNO)
P003	Arau	Mastika Junaidah Husin	BN (UMNO)

=== Kedah ===
No.	Federal Constituency	Member	Party
BN 8 | PAS 7
P004	Langkawi	Abu Bakar Taib	BN (UMNO)
P005	Jerlun	Abu Bakar Othman	BA (PAS)
P006	Kubang Pasu	Mahathir Mohamad	BN (UMNO)
P007	Padang Terap	Zawawi Ahmad	BA (PAS)
P008	Pokok Sena	Mahfuz Omar	BA (PAS)
P009	Alor Star	Chor Chee Heung	BN (MCA)
P010	Kuala Kedah	Mohamad Sabu	BA (PAS)
P011	Pendang	Othman Abdul from 18 July 2002 (Note: Othman was elected to Parliament in the Pendang by-election, 2002 following the death of Fadzil Noor.)	BN (UMNO)
P011	Pendang	Fadzil Noor until 23 June 2002	BA (PAS)
P012	Yan	Nasharudin Mat Isa	BA (PAS)
P013	Sik	Shahnon Ahmad	BA (PAS)
P014	Merbok	Abdul Daim Zainuddin	BN (UMNO)
P015	Sungai Petani	Mahadzir Mohd Khir	BN (UMNO)
P016	Baling	Taib Azamudden Md Taib	BA (PAS)
P017	Padang Serai	Lim Bee Kau	BN (MCA)
P018	Kulim-Bandar Baharu	Abdul Kadir Sheikh Fadzir	BN (UMNO)

=== Kelantan ===
No.	Federal Constituency	Member	Party
PAS 10 | KeADILan 3 | BN 1
P019	Tumpat	Kamarudin Jaffar	BA (PAS)
P020	Pengkalan Chepa	Nik Mohd. Amar Nik Abdullah	BA (PAS)
P021	Kota Bharu	Ramli Ibrahim	BA (KeADILan)
P022	Pasir Mas	Ismail Noh	BA (PAS)
P023	Rantau Panjang	Abdul Fatah Harun	BA (PAS)
P024	Kubang Kerian	Husam Musa	BA (PAS)
P025	Bachok	Wan Nik Wan Yusoff	BA (PAS)
P026	Peringat	Muhamad Mustafa	BA (KeADILan)
P027	Tanah Merah	Saupi Daud	BA (KeADILan)
P028	Pasir Puteh	Alwi Jusoh	BA (PAS)
P029	Machang	Mohd Yusoff Mohd Nor	BA (PAS)
P030	Jeli	Mohd Apandi Mohamad	BA (PAS)
P031	Kuala Krai	Mohamed Nasir Che Daud	BA (PAS)
P032	Gua Musang	Tengku Razaleigh Hamzah	BN (UMNO)

=== Terengganu ===
No.	Federal Constituency	Member	Party
PAS 7 | KeADILan 1
P033	Besut	Hassan Mohamed	BA (PAS)
P034	Setiu	Che Ghani Che Ambak	BA (PAS)
P035	Kuala Nerus	M. Shukrimum Shamsudin	BA (PAS)
P036	Kuala Terengganu	Syed Azman Syed Ahmad Nawawi	BA (PAS)
P037	Marang	Abdul Hadi Awang	BA (PAS)
P038	Hulu Terengganu	Muhyiddin Abdul Rashid	BA (PAS)
P039	Dungun	Mustafa Ali	BA (PAS)
P040	Kemaman	Abd Rahman Yusof	BA (KeADILan)

=== Penang ===
No.	Federal Constituency	Member	Party
BN 6 | DAP 4 | KeADILan 1
P041	Kepala Batas	Abdullah Ahmad Badawi	BN (UMNO)
P042	Tasek Gelugor	Mohd Shariff Omar	BN (UMNO)
P043	Bagan	Lim Hock Seng	BA (DAP)
P044	Permatang Pauh	Wan Azizah Wan Ismail	BA (KeADILan)
P045	Bukit Mertajam	Chong Eng	BA (DAP)
P046	Nibong Tebal	Goh Kheng Huat	BA (DAP)
P047	Bukit Bendera	Chia Kwang Chye	BN (Gerakan)
P048	Tanjong	Chow Kon Yeow	BA (DAP)
P049	Jelutong	Lee Kah Choon	BN (Gerakan)
P050	Bayan Baru	Wong Kam Hoong	BN (MCA)
P051	Balik Pulau	Mohd. Zain Omar	BN (UMNO)

=== Perak ===
No.	Federal Constituency	Member	Party
BN 20 | PAS 2 | DAP 1
P052	Gerik	Khamsiyah Yeop	BN (UMNO)
P053	Larut	Raja Ahmad Zainuddin Raja Omar	BN (UMNO)
P054	Parit Buntar	Hasan Mohamed Ali	BA (PAS)
P055	Bagan Serai	Zainal Abidin Zin	BN (UMNO)
P056	Bukit Gantang	Abdullah Fadzil Che Wan	BN (UMNO)
P057	Taiping	Kerk Choo Ting	BN (Gerakan)
P058	Chenderoh	Mohamed Nazri Abdul Aziz	BN (UMNO)
P059	Sungai Siput	Samy Vellu	BN (MIC)
P060	Tambun	Ahmad Husni Hanadzlah	BN (UMNO)
P061	Ipoh Timor	Thong Fah Chong	BN (MCA)
P062	Ipoh Barat	Ho Cheong Sing	BN (MCA)
P063	Batu Gajah	Fong Po Kuan	BA (DAP)
P064	Kuala Kangsar	Rafidah Aziz	BN (UMNO)
P065	Beruas	Lim Keng Yaik	BN (Gerakan)
P066	Parit	Mat Basir Rahmat	BA (PAS)
P067	Gopeng	Ting Chew Peh	BN (MCA)
P068	Kampar	Hew See Tong	BN (MCA)
P069	Tapah	S. Veerasingam	BN (MIC)
P070	Pasir Salak	Ramli Ngah Talib	BN (UMNO)
P071	Lumut	Kong Cho Ha	BN (MCA)
P072	Bagan Datok	Ahmad Zahid Hamidi	BN (UMNO)
P073	Telok Intan	Mah Siew Keong	BN (Gerakan)
P074	Tanjong Malim	Loke Yuen Yow	BN (MCA)

=== Pahang ===
No.	Federal Constituency	Member	Party
BN 11
P075	Lipis	Amihamzah Ahmad	BN (UMNO)
P076	Raub	Ng Yen Yen	BN (MCA)
P077	Jerantut	Tengku Azlan Sultan Abu Bakar	BN (UMNO)
P078	Kuantan	Mohd Khalil Yaakob	BN (UMNO)
P079	Paya Besar	Siti Zaharah Sulaiman	BN (UMNO)
P080	Pekan	Najib Razak	BN (UMNO)
P081	Maran	Muhammad Abdullah (Deputy Speaker)	BN (UMNO)
P082	Mentakab	Fu Ah Kiow	BN (MCA)
P083	Bentong	Liow Tiong Lai	BN (MCA)
P084	Temerloh	Mohd. Sarit Yusoh	BN (UMNO)
P085	Rompin	Jamaluddin Jarjis	BN (UMNO)

=== Selangor ===
No.	Federal Constituency	Member	Party
BN 17
P086	Sabak Bernam	Zainal Dahlan	BN (UMNO)
P087	Tanjong Karang	Noh Omar	BN (UMNO)
P088	Hulu Selangor	Palanivel Govindasamy	BN (MIC)
P089	Kuala Selangor	Jamaluddin Adnan	BN (UMNO)
P090	Selayang	Chan Kong Choy	BN (MCA)
P091	Gombak	Zaleha Ismail	BN (UMNO)
P092	Ampang Jaya	Ong Tee Keat	BN (MCA)
P093	Hulu Langat	Badrul Hisham Abdul Aziz	BN (UMNO)
P094	Petaling Jaya Utara	Chew Mei Fun	BN (MCA)
P095	Petaling Jaya Selatan	Donald Lim Siang Chai	BN (MCA)
P096	Serdang	Yap Pian Hon	BN (MCA)
P097	Subang	Karnail Singh Nijhar	BN (MIC)
P098	Shah Alam	Mohd Zin Mohamed	BN (UMNO)
P099	Kapar	P. Komala Devi	BN (MIC)
P100	Klang	Tan Yee Kew	BN (MCA)
P101	Kuala Langat	Shafie Salleh	BN (UMNO)
P102	Sepang	Seripah Noli Syed Hussin	BN (UMNO)

=== Federal Territory of Kuala Lumpur ===
No.	Federal Constituency	Member	Party
BN 6 | DAP 4
P103	Kepong	Tan Seng Giaw	BA (DAP)
P104	Batu	Ng Lip Yong	BN (Gerakan)
P105	Wangsa Maju	Zulhasnan Rafique	BN (UMNO)
P106	Segambut	Tan Kee Kwong	BN (Gerakan)
P107	Titiwangsa	Suleiman Mohamed	BN (UMNO)
P108	Bukit Bintang	Fong Kui Lun	BA (DAP)
P109	Lembah Pantai	Shahrizat Abdul Jalil	BN (UMNO)
P110	Seputeh	Teresa Kok Suh Sim	BA (DAP)
P111	Cheras	Tan Kok Wai	BA (DAP)
P112	Bandar Tun Razak	Tan Chai Ho	BN (MCA)

=== Negeri Sembilan ===
No.	Federal Constituency	Member	Party
BN 7
P113	Jelebu	Rais Yatim	BN (UMNO)
P114	Jempol	Mohd. Khalid Mohd. Yunus	BN (UMNO)
P115	Tampin	Shaziman Abu Mansor	BN (UMNO)
P116	Kuala Pilah	Napsiah Omar	BN (UMNO)
P117	Seremban	Hon Choon Kim	BN (MCA)
P118	Rasah	Goh Siow Huat	BN (MCA)
P119	Telok Kemang	S. Sothinathan from 10 June 2000 (Note: Sothinathan was elected to Parliament in the Telok Kemang by-election, 2000 after the death of parliamentary secretary to the Health Ministry, S. A. Anpalagan.)	BN (MIC)
P119	Telok Kemang	S. A. Anpalagan until 28 April 2000	BN (MIC)

=== Malacca ===
No.	Federal Constituency	Member	Party
BN 4 | DAP 1
P120	Alor Gajah	Abu Seman Yusop	BN (UMNO)
P121	Selandar	Fong Chan Onn	BN (MCA)
P122	Batu Berendam	Abdul Ghafar Baba	BN (UMNO)
P123	Kota Melaka	Kerk Kim Hock	BA (DAP)
P124	Jasin	Abu Zahar Ithnin	BN (UMNO)

=== Johor ===
No.	Federal Constituency	Member	Party
BN 20
P125	Segamat	Subramaniam Sinniah	BN (MIC)
P126	Ledang	Hashim Ismail	BN (UMNO)
P127	Pagoh	Muhyiddin Yassin	BN (UMNO)
P128	Labis	Ling Liong Sik	BN (MCA)
P129	Mersing	Abdul Latiff Ahmad	BN (UMNO)
P130	Kluang	Hoo Seong Chang	BN (MCA)
P131	Parit Sulong	Ruhanie Ahmad	BN (UMNO)
P132	Bakri	Chua Jui Meng	BN (MCA)
P133	Muar	Robia Kosai	BN (UMNO)
P134	Sri Gading	Mohamad Aziz	BN (UMNO)
P135	Batu Pahat	Siam Kasrin	BN (UMNO)
P136	Tenggara	Hishammuddin Hussein	BN (UMNO)
P137	Sungai Benut	Abdul Hamid Abdul Rahman	BN (UMNO)
P138	Senai	Lim Si Cheng (Deputy Speaker)	BN (MCA)
P139	Kota Tinggi	Syed Hamid Albar	BN (UMNO)
P140	Tebrau	Mohd. Ali Hassan	BN (UMNO)
P141	Johor Bahru	Mohamed Khaled Nordin	BN (UMNO)
P142	Pulai	Abdul Kadir Annuar	BN (UMNO)
P143	Gelang Patah	Chang See Ten	BN (MCA)
P144	Pontian	Ong Ka Ting	BN (MCA)

=== Federal Territory of Labuan ===
No.	Federal Constituency	Member	Party
BN 1
P145	Labuan	Suhaili Abdul Rahman	BN (UMNO)

=== Sabah ===
No.	Federal Constituency	Member	Party
BN 17 | PBS 3
P146	Marudu	Amir Kahar Mustapha	BN (UMNO)
P147	Bandau	Maximus Johnity Ongkili	PBS
P148	Kota Belud	Salleh Said Keruak	BN (UMNO)
P149	Tuaran	Wilfred Madius Tangau	BN (UPKO)
P150	Gaya	Liew Teck Chan from 12 October 2002 (Note: Yong Teck Lee was originally elected to serve in this constituency. Yong disqualified as Gaya MP and Likas assemblymen since September 2002 due to found guilty of corruption according to the Election Offences Act 1954. Liew was elected to Parliament in the Gaya by-election, 2002.)	BN (SAPP)
P150	Gaya	Yong Teck Lee until 3 September 2002	BN (SAPP)
P151	Tanjong Aru	Yee Moh Chai	PBS
P152	Penampang	Philip Benedict Lasimbang	BN (UPKO)
P153	Papar	Osu Sukam	BN (UMNO)
P154	Beaufort	Anifah Aman	BN (UMNO)
P155	Sipitang	Yusof Yacob	BN (UMNO)
P156	Kinabalu	Bernard Giluk Dompok	BN (UPKO)
P157	Keningau	Joseph Pairin Kitingan	PBS
P158	Tenom	Rizalman Abdullah	BN (UMNO)
P159	Beluran	Ronald Kiandee	BN (UMNO)
P160	Libaran	Juslie Ajirol	BN (UMNO)
P161	Sandakan	Lau Ngan Siew	BN (LDP)
P162	Kinabatangan	Bung Moktar Radin	BN (UMNO)
P163	Silam	Railey Jeffrey	BN (UMNO)
P164	Semporna	Shafie Apdal	BN (UMNO)
P165	Tawau	Shim Paw Fatt	BN (SAPP)

=== Sarawak ===
No.	Federal Constituency	Member	Party
BN 28
P166	Mas Gading	Tiki Lafe	BN (SPDP)
P167	Santubong	Rohani Abdul Karim	BN (PBB)
P168	Petra Jaya	Sulaiman Daud	BN (PBB)
P169	Bandar Kuching	Song Swee Guan	BN (SUPP)
P170	Stampin	Yong Khoon Seng	BN (SUPP)
P171	Kota Samarahan	Abdul Taib Mahmud	BN (PBB)
P172	Mambong	James Dawos Mamit	BN (PBB)
P173	Serian	Richard Riot Jaem	BN (SUPP)
P174	Batang Sadong	Sukinam Domo	BN (PBB)
P175	Batang Lupar	Wan Junaidi Tuanku Jaafar	BN (PBB)
P176	Sri Aman	Jimmy Donald Lim	BN (PRS)
P177	Lubok Antu	Jawah Gerang	BN (PRS)
P178	Betong	Douglas Uggah Embas	BN (PBB)
P179	Saratok	Peter Tinggom Kamarau	BN (SNAP)
P180	Kuala Rajang	Mohd Effendi Norwawi	BN (PBB)
P181	Sarikei	Law Hieng Ding	BN (SUPP)
P182	Julau	Joseph Salang Gandum	BN (PRS)
P183	Kanowit	Leo Moggie Irok	BN (PRS)
P184	Lanang	Tiong Thai King	BN (SUPP)
P185	Sibu	Robert Lau Hoi Chew	BN (SUPP)
P186	Mukah	Leo Michael Toyad	BN (PBB)
P187	Selangau	Joseph Mauh Ikeh	BN (PRS)
P188	Kapit	Alexander Nanta Linggi	BN (PBB)
P189	Hulu Rajang	Billy Abit Joo	BN (PRS)
P190	Bintulu	Tiong King Sing	BN (SPDP)
P191	Miri	Peter Chin Fah Kui	BN (SUPP)
P192	Baram	Jacob Dungau Sagan	BN (SPDP)
P193	Bukit Mas	Henry Sum Agong	BN (PBB)
