= Members of the Dewan Rakyat, 9th Malaysian Parliament =

9th Parliament of Malaysia
←	8th Parliament	10th Parliament	→

Overview
- Legislative body: Parliament of Malaysia
- Jurisdiction: Malaysia
- Meeting place: Malaysian Houses of Parliament
- Term: 7 June 1995 – 11 November 1999
- Election: 1995 general election
- Government: Fifth Mahathir cabinet
- Website: www.parlimen.gov.my

Dewan Rakyat
- Members: 192
- Speaker: Mohamed Zahir Ismail
- Deputy Speaker: Ong Tee Keat; Juhar Mahiruddin
- Secretary: Abdul Rahman Ali (until 1998); Mohd Salleh Hassan
- Prime Minister: Mahathir Mohamad
- Leader of the Opposition: Lim Kit Siang
- Party control: Barisan Nasional

Sovereign
- Yang di-Pertuan Agong: Tuanku Jaafar (until 25 April 1999); Tuanku Salahuddin Abdul Aziz Shah

Sessions
- 1st: 7 June 1995 – 11 January 1996
- 2nd: 25 March 1996 – 19 December 1996
- 3rd: 24 March 1997 – 18 December 1997
- 4th: 23 March 1998 – 10 December 1998
- 5th: 5 April 1999 – 10 November 1999

This is a list of the members of the Dewan Rakyat (House of Representatives) of the 9th Parliament of Malaysia, elected in 1995.

== Composition ==
State	# of Seats	UMNO Seats	MCA Seats	MIC Seats	PAS Seats	Gerakan Seats	PPP Seats	DAP Seats	S46 Seats	PRM Seats	AKIM Seats	PBS Seats	LDP Seats	PDS Seats	SAPP Seats	PBB Seats	PBDS Seats	SNAP Seats	SUPP Seats	PBRS Seats	AKAR Seats	BN Seats	IND Seats
Perlis	3	3																					
Kedah	15	13	2																				
Kelantan	14	2			6				6														
Terengganu	8	7			1																		
Penang	11	4	2			2		3															
Perak	23	11	7	2		3																	
Pahang	11	8	3																				
Selangor	17	8	6	3																			
Federal Territory of Kuala Lumpur	10	3	1			2		4															
Negeri Sembilan	7	4	2	1																			
Malacca	5	3	1					1															
Johor	20	13	6	1																			
Federal Territory of Labuan	1	1																					
Sabah	20	9										8	1		2								
Sarawak	27							1								10	5	3	7			1	
Seats won	192	89	30	7	7	7	0	9	6	0	0	8	1	0	2	10	5	3	7	0	0	1	0
Seats contested	426	103	35	7	46	10	0	49	64	3	2	28	1	2	3	10	5	4	7	2	2	1	43

== Elected members by state ==
Shortcut:

Perlis | Kedah | Kelantan | Terengganu | Pulau Pinang | Perak | Pahang | Selangor | Kuala Lumpur | Negeri Sembilan | Melaka | Johor | Labuan | Sabah | Sarawak

Unless noted otherwise, the MPs served the entire term of the parliament (from 7 June 1995 until 10 November 1999).

=== Perlis ===
No.	Federal Constituency	Member	Party
BN 2 | PAS 1
P001	Padang Besar	Azmi Khalid	BN (UMNO)
P002	Kangar	Md Isa Sabu	BN (UMNO)
P003	Arau	Hashim Jasin from 4 July 1998 (Note: Hashim was elected to Parliament in the Arau by-election, 1998 following the death of Kamarudin Ahmad.)	APU (PAS)
P003	Arau	Kamarudin Ahmad until 25 May 1998	BN (UMNO)

=== Kedah ===
No.	Federal Constituency	Member	Party
BN 15
P004	Langkawi	Abu Bakar Taib	BN (UMNO)
P005	Jerlun	Hanafi Ramli	BN (UMNO)
P006	Kubang Pasu	Mahathir Mohamad	BN (UMNO)
P007	Padang Terap	Affifudin Omar	BN (UMNO)
P008	Pokok Sena	Wan Hanafiah Wan Mat Saman	BN (UMNO)
P009	Alor Star	Chor Chee Heung	BN (MCA)
P010	Kuala Kedah	Zakaria Mohd Said	BN (UMNO)
P011	Pendang	Othman Abdul	BN (UMNO)
P012	Yan	Badruddin Amiruldin	BN (UMNO)
P013	Sik	Abdul Hamid Othman	BN (UMNO)
P014	Merbok	Abdul Daim Zainuddin	BN (UMNO)
P015	Sungai Petani	Che Ibrahim Mustafa	BN (UMNO)
P016	Baling	Raja Ariffin Raja Sulaiman	BN (UMNO)
P017	Padang Serai	Lim Lay Hoon	BN (MCA)
P018	Kulim-Bandar Baharu	Abdul Kadir Sheikh Fadzir	BN (UMNO)

=== Kelantan ===
No.	Federal Constituency	Member	Party
PAS 6 | S46 6 | BN 2
P019	Tumpat	Wan Mohd. Jamil Wan Mahmood	APU (PAS)
P020	Pengkalan Chepa	Nik Mohd. Amar Nik Abdullah	APU (PAS)
P021	Kota Bharu	Ilani Isahak	APU (S46)
P022	Pasir Mas	Zainuddin Mohamad Nor	APU (S46)
P023	Rantau Panjang	Daeng Sanusi Daeng Mariok	APU (PAS)
P024	Kubang Kerian	Mohamad Sabu	APU (PAS)
P025	Bachok	Buniyamin Yaakob	APU (PAS)
P026	Peringat	Annuar Musa	BN (UMNO)
P027	Tanah Merah	Ibrahim Pateh Mohammad	APU (S46)
P028	Pasir Puteh	Mohamed Abdullah	APU (S46)
P029	Machang	Sukri Mohamed	APU (S46)
P030	Jeli	Mustapa Mohamed	BN (UMNO)
P031	Kuala Krai	Ibrahim Mahmood	APU (PAS)
P032	Gua Musang	Tengku Razaleigh Hamzah recontest, won on 29 August 1995 (Note: On August 1, 1995, the Kota Bharu High Court ordered a fresh election for the Gua Musang Parliamentary Seat after declaring the contest in the 8th General Election held in April the same year null and void. Tengku Razaleigh Hamzah was the incumbent MP.)	APU (S46)

=== Terengganu ===
No.	Federal Constituency	Member	Party
BN 7 | PAS 1
P033	Besut	Idris Jusoh	BN (UMNO)
P034	Setiu	Tengku Mahmud Tengku Mansor	BN (UMNO)
P035	Kuala Nerus	Abdul Rahin Mohd Said	BN (UMNO)
P036	Kuala Terengganu	Abu Bakar Daud	BN (UMNO)
P037	Marang	Abdul Hadi Awang	APU (PAS)
P038	Hulu Terengganu	Mustafa Muda	BN (UMNO)
P039	Dungun	Mokhtaruddin Wan Yusof	BN (UMNO)
P040	Kemaman	Ramli Taib	BN (UMNO)

=== Penang ===
No.	Federal Constituency	Member	Party
BN 7 | DAP 3 | VAC 1
P041	Kepala Batas	Abdullah Ahmad Badawi	BN (UMNO)
P042	Tasek Gelugor	Ibrahim Saad	BN (UMNO)
P043	Bagan	Lim Hock Seng from 9 September 1995 (Note: Lim was elected to Parliament in the Bagan by-election, 1995 after the death of the incumbent member P. Patto.)	GR (DAP)
P043	Bagan	P. Patto until 12 July 1995	GR (DAP)
P044	Permatang Pauh	Anwar Ibrahim until 14 April 1999 (Note: Former Deputy Prime Minister of Malaysia, Anwar Ibrahim was elected to Parliament on the ticket of Barisan Nasional but sit as an independent in late 1998.)	BN (UMNO)
P044	Permatang Pauh	Anwar Ibrahim until 14 April 1999	IND
P044	Permatang Pauh	Vacant from 14 April 1999	VAC
P045	Bukit Mertajam	Tan Chong Keng	BN (MCA)
P046	Nibong Tebal	Goh Cheng Teik	BN (Gerakan)
P047	Bukit Bendera	Chia Kwang Chye	BN (Gerakan)
P048	Tanjong	Lim Kit Siang	GR (DAP)
P049	Jelutong	Karpal Singh	GR (DAP)
P050	Bayan Baru	Wong Kam Hoong	BN (MCA)
P051	Balik Pulau	Nungsari Ahmad Radhi	BN (UMNO)

=== Perak ===
No.	Federal Constituency	Member	Party
BN 22 | DAP 1
P052	Gerik	Tajol Rosli Mohd Ghazali	BN (UMNO)
P053	Larut	Mohd. Zihin Mohd. Hassan	BN (UMNO)
P054	Parit Buntar	Abdul Rahman Sulaiman	BN (UMNO)
P055	Bagan Serai	Qamaruzaman Ismail	BN (UMNO)
P056	Bukit Gantang	Abdullah Fadzil Che Wan	BN (UMNO)
P057	Taiping	Kerk Choo Ting	BN (Gerakan)
P058	Chenderoh	Mohamed Nazri Abdul Aziz	BN (UMNO)
P059	Sungai Siput	Samy Vellu	BN (MIC)
P060	Tambun	Ahmad Husni Hanadzlah	BN (UMNO)
P061	Ipoh Timor	Chang Kon You	BN (MCA)
P062	Ipoh Barat	Ho Cheong Sing	BN (MCA)
P063	Batu Gajah	Yeong Chee Wah	BN (MCA)
P064	Kuala Kangsar	Rafidah Aziz	BN (UMNO)
P065	Beruas	Lim Keng Yaik	BN (Gerakan)
P066	Parit	Ainon Khairiyah Mohd. Abas	BN (UMNO)
P067	Gopeng	Ting Chew Peh	BN (MCA)
P068	Kampar	Hew See Tong	BN (MCA)
P069	Tapah	K. Kumaran	BN (MIC)
P070	Pasir Salak	Megat Junid Megat Ayub	BN (UMNO)
P071	Lumut	Yap Yit Thong	BN (MCA)
P072	Bagan Datok	Ahmad Zahid Hamidi	BN (UMNO)
P073	Telok Intan	M. Kulasegaran from 17 May 1997 (Note: Kulasegaran was elected to Parliament in a Telok Intan by-election, 1997 caused by the death of the incumbent member Ong Tin Kim.)	GR (DAP)
P073	Telok Intan	Ong Tin Kim until 10 April 1997	BN (Gerakan)
P074	Tanjong Malim	Loke Yuen Yow	BN (MCA)

=== Pahang ===
No.	Federal Constituency	Member	Party
BN 11
P075	Lipis	Amihamzah Ahmad from 14 January 1997 (Note: Amihamzah was elected to Parliament in the Lipis by-election, 1997 caused by the death of the incumbent member Abu Dahari Osman.)	BN (UMNO)
P075	Lipis	Abu Dahari Osman until 29 December 1996	BN (UMNO)
P076	Raub	Teng Gaik Kwan	BN (MCA)
P077	Jerantut	Ahmad Kamaruzaman Mohamed Baria	BN (UMNO)
P078	Kuantan	Fauzi Abdul Rahman	BN (UMNO)
P079	Paya Besar	Siti Zaharah Sulaiman	BN (UMNO)
P080	Pekan	Najib Razak	BN (UMNO)
P081	Maran	Muhammad Abdullah	BN (UMNO)
P082	Mentakab	Fu Ah Kiow	BN (MCA)
P083	Bentong	Lim Ah Lek	BN (MCA)
P084	Temerloh	Sabbaruddin Chik	BN (UMNO)
P085	Rompin	Jamaluddin Jarjis	BN (UMNO)

=== Selangor ===
No.	Federal Constituency	Member	Party
BN 17
P086	Sabak Bernam	Mahbud Hashim	BN (UMNO)
P087	Tanjong Karang	Noh Omar	BN (UMNO)
P088	Hulu Selangor	Palanivel Govindasamy	BN (MIC)
P089	Kuala Selangor	Jamaluddin Adnan from 29 May 1997 (Note: Abu Hassan Omar was originally elected to serve in this constituency, but step down to contest in a Permatang by-election, 1997. Prior to by-election, Jamaluddin step down from his seat to contest in a Kuala Selangor by-election, 1997.)	BN (UMNO)
P089	Kuala Selangor	Abu Hassan Omar until 30 April 1997	BN (UMNO)
P090	Selayang	Chan Kong Choy	BN (MCA)
P091	Gombak	Zaleha Ismail	BN (UMNO)
P092	Ampang Jaya	Ong Tee Keat (Deputy Speaker)	BN (MCA)
P093	Hulu Langat	Badrul Hisham Abdul Aziz	BN (UMNO)
P094	Petaling Jaya Utara	Vincent Lim Kuo Phau	BN (MCA)
P095	Petaling Jaya Selatan	Donald Lim Siang Chai	BN (MCA)
P096	Serdang	Yap Pian Hon	BN (MCA)
P097	Subang	M. Mahalingam	BN (MIC)
P098	Shah Alam	Salamon Selamat	BN (UMNO)
P099	Kapar	G. Leelavathi	BN (MIC)
P100	Klang	Tan Yee Kew	BN (MCA)
P101	Kuala Langat	Shafie Salleh	BN (UMNO)
P102	Sepang	Seripah Noli Syed Hussin	BN (UMNO)

=== Federal Territory of Kuala Lumpur ===
No.	Federal Constituency	Member	Party
BN 6 | DAP 3 | IND 1
P103	Kepong	Tan Seng Giaw	GR (DAP)
P104	Batu	Joseph Chong Chek Ah (Note: Chong was elected to Parliament on the ticket of Barisan Nasional but sit as an independent later.)	BN (Gerakan)
P104	Batu	Joseph Chong Chek Ah	IND
P105	Wangsa Maju	Kamal Salleh	BN (UMNO)
P106	Segambut	Tan Kee Kwong	BN (Gerakan)
P107	Titiwangsa	Suleiman Mohamed	BN (UMNO)
P108	Bukit Bintang	Lee Chong Meng Decision of High Court confirmed on 29 February 1996 (Note: Wee Choo Keong of DAP was originally elected to serve in this constituency. Wee was removed from the Bukit Bintang seat in 1995 after a controversial court case which nullified his re-election that year due to the fine he had received.)	BN (MCA)
P108	Bukit Bintang	Wee Choo Keong until 29 February 1996	GR (DAP)
P109	Lembah Pantai	Shahrizat Abdul Jalil	BN (UMNO)
P110	Seputeh	Liew Ah Kim	GR (DAP)
P111	Cheras	Tan Kok Wai	GR (DAP)
P112	Bandar Tun Razak	Tan Chai Ho	BN (MCA)

=== Negeri Sembilan ===
No.	Federal Constituency	Member	Party
BN 7
P113	Jelebu	Yunus Rahmat	BN (UMNO)
P114	Jempol	Mohd. Khalid Mohd. Yunus	BN (UMNO)
P115	Tampin	Mohd. Noh Rajab	BN (UMNO)
P116	Kuala Pilah	Abu Zahar Ujang	BN (UMNO)
P117	Seremban	Hon Choon Kim	BN (MCA)
P118	Rasah	Wong See Wah	BN (MCA)
P119	Telok Kemang	L. Krishnan	BN (MIC)

=== Malacca ===
No.	Federal Constituency	Member	Party
BN 4 | VAC 1
P120	Alor Gajah	Abu Seman Yusop	BN (UMNO)
P121	Selandar	Fong Chan Onn	BN (MCA)
P122	Batu Berendam	Mohd Ali Rustam	BN (UMNO)
P123	Kota Melaka	Lim Guan Eng until 31 March 1999	GR (DAP)
P123	Kota Melaka	Vacant from 31 March 1999	VAC
P124	Jasin	Abdul Ghafar Baba	BN (UMNO)

=== Johor ===
No.	Federal Constituency	Member	Party
BN 20
P125	Segamat	Subramaniam Sinniah	BN (MIC)
P126	Ledang	Hashim Ismail	BN (UMNO)
P127	Pagoh	Muhyiddin Yassin	BN (UMNO)
P128	Labis	Ling Liong Sik	BN (MCA)
P129	Mersing	Zainal Abidin Osman	BN (UMNO)
P130	Kluang	Hoo Seong Chang	BN (MCA)
P131	Parit Sulong	Ruhanie Ahmad	BN (UMNO)
P132	Bakri	Chua Jui Meng	BN (MCA)
P133	Muar	Abdul Aziz Mohd. Yassin	BN (UMNO)
P134	Sri Gading	Hamzah Ramli	BN (UMNO)
P135	Batu Pahat	Mansor Masikon	BN (UMNO)
P136	Tenggara	Hishammuddin Hussein	BN (UMNO)
P137	Sungai Benut	Abdul Hamid Abdul Rahman	BN (UMNO)
P138	Senai	Lim Si Cheng	BN (MCA)
P139	Kota Tinggi	Syed Hamid Albar	BN (UMNO)
P140	Tebrau	Siti Zainabon Abu Bakar	BN (UMNO)
P141	Johor Bahru	Mohamed Khaled Nordin	BN (UMNO)
P142	Pulai	Mohamed Rahmat	BN (UMNO)
P143	Gelang Patah	Chang See Ten	BN (MCA)
P144	Pontian	Ong Ka Ting	BN (MCA)

=== Federal Territory of Labuan ===
No.	Federal Constituency	Member	Party
BN 1
P145	Labuan	Abdol Mulok Awang Damit	BN (UMNO)

=== Sabah ===
No.	Federal Constituency	Member	Party
BN 12 | PBS 8
P146	Marudu	Amir Kahar Mustapha	GR (PBS)
P147	Bandau	Maximus Johnity Ongkili	GR (PBS)
P148	Kota Belud	Salleh Said Keruak	BN (UMNO)
P149	Tuaran	Yunof Edward Maringking	GR (PBS)
P150	Gaya	Philip Yong Chiew Lip	BN (SAPP)
P151	Tanjong Aru	Yee Moh Chai	GR (PBS)
P152	Penampang	Paulis Noitien	GR (PBS)
P153	Papar	Osu Sukam	BN (UMNO)
P154	Beaufort	Nurnikman Abdullah	BN (UMNO)
P155	Sipitang	Yusof Yacob	BN (UMNO)
P156	Kinabalu	Henrynus Amin	GR (PBS)
P157	Keningau	Joseph Pairin Kitingan	GR (PBS)
P158	Tenom	Raden Malleh	GR (PBS)
P159	Beluran	Asmat Nungka	BN (UMNO)
P160	Libaran	Akbarkhan Abdul Rahman	BN (UMNO)
P161	Sandakan	Lau Ngan Siew	BN (LDP)
P162	Kinabatangan	Juhar Mahiruddin (Deputy Speaker)	BN (UMNO)
P163	Silam	Railey Jeffrey	BN (UMNO)
P164	Semporna	Shafie Apdal	BN (UMNO)
P165	Tawau	Chua Soon Bui	BN (SAPP)

=== Sarawak ===
No.	Federal Constituency	Member	Party
BN 26 | DAP 1
P166	Mas Gading	Patau Rubis	BN (SNAP)
P167	Santubong	Rohani Abdul Karim	BN (PBB)
P168	Petra Jaya	Sulaiman Daud	BN (PBB)
P169	Bandar Kuching	Song Swee Guan	BN (SUPP)
P170	Padawan	Yong Khoon Seng	BN (SUPP)
P171	Kota Samarahan	Abdul Taib Mahmud	BN (PBB)
P172	Serian	Richard Riot Jaem	BN (SUPP)
P173	Batang Sadong	Sukinam Domo	BN (PBB)
P174	Batang Lupar	Wan Junaidi Tuanku Jaafar	BN (PBB)
P175	Sri Aman	Jimmy Donald Lim	BN (PBDS)
P176	Lubok Antu	Jawah Gerang	BN (PBDS)
P177	Betong	Douglas Uggah Embas	BN (PBB)
P178	Saratok	Peter Tinggom Kamarau	BN (SNAP)
P179	Kuala Rajang	Abang Abu Bakar Abang Mustapha	BN (PBB)
P180	Sarikei	Law Hieng Ding	BN (SUPP)
P181	Julau	Sng Chee Hua	BN (PBDS)
P182	Kanowit	Leo Moggie Irok	BN (PBDS)
P183	Lanang	Tiong Thai King	BN (SUPP)
P184	Sibu	Robert Lau Hoi Chew	BN (SUPP)
P185	Mukah	Leo Michael Toyad	BN (PBB)
P186	Selangau	Joseph Mauh Ikeh	BN (PBDS)
P187	Kapit	James Jimbun Pungga	BN (PBB)
P188	Hulu Rajang	Billy Abit Joo	BN
P189	Bintulu	Chiew Chiu Sing	GR (DAP)
P190	Miri	Peter Chin Fah Kui	BN (SUPP)
P191	Baram	Jacob Dungau Sagan	BN (SNAP)
P192	Bukit Mas	Michael Lisa Kaya	BN (PBB)
