= Hee Tien Lai =

Malaysian politician

Yang Berbahagia Hee Tien Lai AMN

Deputy Speaker of the Dewan Rakyat
- In office 14 June 1982 – 26 July 1983
- Monarch: Ahmad Shah
- Prime Minister: Mahathir Mohamad
- Speaker: Mohamed Zahir Ismail
- Preceded by: Mansor Othman
- Succeeded by: Abdul Hamid Pawanteh
- Constituency: Ayer Hitam

Member of the Malaysian Parliament for Ayer Hitam, Johor
- In office 1974–1986
- Preceded by: Constituency created
- Succeeded by: Constituency abolished

Personal details
- Born: February 20, 1941 Ayer Hitam, Johor, Unfederated Malay States (now Malaysia)
- Died: February 21, 2016 (aged 75) George Town, Penang, Malaysia
- Party: Malayan Chinese Association (MCA)
- Other political affiliations: Barisan Nasional (BN)
- Spouse: Loke Siew Chin
- Children: 3 daughters
- Occupation: Former Member of Parliament
- Profession: Physician

Chinese name
- Traditional Chinese: 許天來
- Simplified Chinese: 许天来
- Hanyu Pinyin: Xǔ Tiānlái
- Pha̍k-fa-sṳ: Hí Thiên-lòi
- Jyutping: Heoi2 Tin1 Loi4
- Hokkien POJ: Khó͘ Thian-lâi

Hee Tien Lai (Chinese: 許天來; pinyin: Xǔ Tiānlái; Pe̍h-ōe-jī: Khó͘ Thian-lâi; 20 February 1941 – 21 February 2016) was a Malaysian politician of the Malaysian Chinese Association (MCA), a component party of National Front or Barisan Nasional (BN) coalition.

Hee contested and won the Malaysia General Election 1974, 1978 and 1982 for the seat in Ayer Hitam, Johor to be Member of Parliament for three terms. He was one of the Deputy Speakers of the Dewan Rakyat from 14 June 1982 until 26 July 1983.

Hee is an alumnus of Batu Pahat High School, the same high school where Lim Kit Siang, Lim Guan Eng, Dato Sri Vincent Tan Chee Yioun (Berjaya Corp. owner), Dr. Chua Soi Lek (Former Health Minister) and other prominent figures studied.

He later resigned to migrate to Australia and carried out a successful medical practice.

== Death ==
Hee died of heart attack at a private hospital at George Town, Penang on 21 February 2016 after attended his 75th birthday reunion celebration bash dinner at a hotel earlier that night before.

== Election results ==
Parliament of Malaysia
Year	Constituency	Candidate	Votes	Pct	Opponent(s)	Votes	Pct	Ballots cast	Majority	Turnout
1974	P105 Ayer Hitam, Johor	Hee Tien Lai (MCA)	Unopposed							
1978	P105 Ayer Hitam, Johor	Hee Tien Lai (MCA)	20,885	88.68%	Jaini Salleh (PAS)	2,666	11.32%	N/A	18,189	N/A
1982	P105 Ayer Hitam, Johor	Hee Tien Lai (MCA)	21,737	78.13%	Chan Yeik Nong (DAP)	6,085	21.87%	28,937	15,652	76.60%

== Honours ==
- Malaysia
  - Member of the Order of the Defender of the Realm (AMN) (1972)

== See also ==
- Ayer Hitam (federal constituency)
