= Lim Si Cheng =

Malaysian politician

Yang Berbahagia Datuk Lim Si Cheng PJN
- 林时清

Deputy Speaker of the Dewan Rakyat
- In office 20 December 1999 – 13 February 2008 Serving with Muhammad Abdullah (1999–2004); Yusof Yacob (2004–2008)
- Monarchs: Salahuddin; Sirajuddin; Mizan Zainal Abidin
- Prime Minister: Mahathir Mohamad (1999–2003); Abdullah Ahmad Badawi (2003–2008)
- Speaker: Mohamed Zahir Ismail (1999–2004); Ramli Ngah Talib (2004–2008)
- Preceded by: Ong Tee Keat
- Succeeded by: Wan Junaidi Tuanku Jaafar
- Constituency: Senai; Kulai

Member of the Malaysian Parliament for Kulai
- In office 21 March 2004 – 8 March 2008
- Preceded by: Constituency created
- Succeeded by: Ong Ka Ting (BN–MCA)

Member of the Malaysian Parliament for Senai
- In office 25 April 1995 – 21 March 2004
- Preceded by: Woon See Chin (BN–MCA)
- Succeeded by: Constituency abolished

Member of the Johor State Legislative Assembly for Bandar Segamat
- In office 1982–1986
- Preceded by: Tan Peng Khoon (BN–MCA)
- Succeeded by: Constituency abolished

Personal details
- Born: 17 February 1949 (age 77)
- Citizenship: Malaysian
- Party: Malaysian Chinese Association (MCA)
- Other political affiliations: Barisan Nasional (BN)
- Occupation: Politician

Lim Si Cheng (born 17 February 1949) is a Malaysian politician of the Malaysian Chinese Association (MCA), a Chinese member of the Barisan National (BN). He was served as Deputy Speaker of the Dewan Rakyat from 1999 to 2008.

== Election results ==
Johor State Legislative Assembly
Year	Constituency	Candidate	Votes	Pct	Opponent(s)	Votes	Pct	Ballots cast	Majority	Turnout
1982	N03 Bandar Segamat	Lim Si Cheng (MCA)	12,204	63.31%	Foo Kok Yong (DAP)	7,073	36.69%	19,717	5,131	78.38%
1990	N08 Bekok	Lim Si Cheng (MCA)	7,348	47.40%	Pang Hok Liong (DAP)	7,638	49.27%	15,502	290	70.43%

Parliament of Malaysia
Year	Constituency	Candidate	Votes	Pct	Opponent(s)	Votes	Pct	Ballots cast	Majority	Turnout
1995	P138 Senai	Lim Si Cheng (MCA)	32,170	71.98%	M. Salleh Ahmad (DAP)	12,522	28.02%	46,428	19,648	76.50%
1999	P138 Senai	Lim Si Cheng (MCA)	32,237	68.68%	Tan Hang Meng (DAP)	14,704	31.32%	48,556	17,533	74.98%
2004	P163 Kulai	Lim Si Cheng (MCA)	32,278	69.55%	Ong Kow Meng (DAP)	14,134	30.45%	48,377	18,144	77.69%

== Honours ==
- Malaysia
  - Commander of the Order of Meritorious Service (PJN) – Datuk (1997)
