= Speaker of the Dewan Rakyat =

Presiding officer of the Malaysian lower house of Parliament

- Yang di-Pertua Dewan Rakyat يڠ دڤرتوا ديوان رعيت

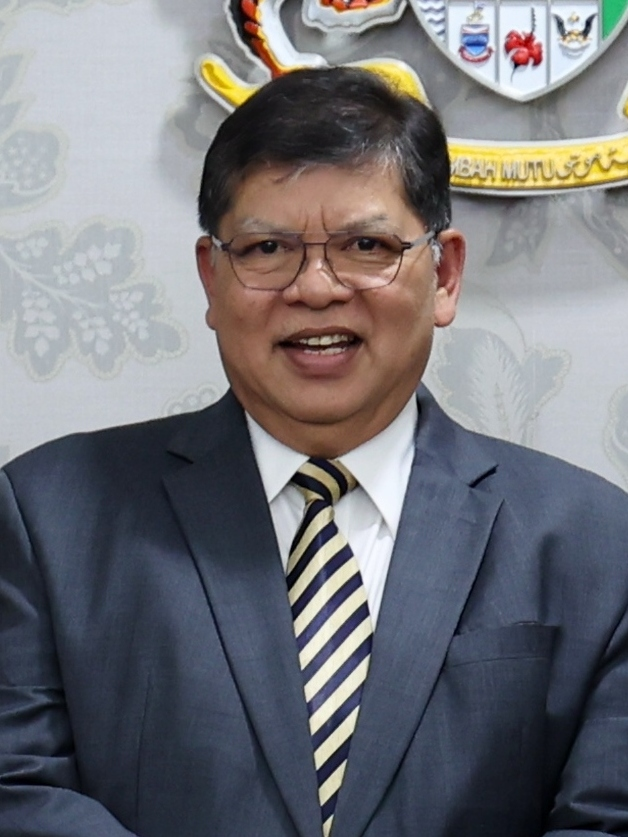
- Incumbent; Johari Abdul since 19 December 2022
- Dewan Rakyat
- Style: Yang Berhormat; Tuan Yang di-Pertua (formal); Tuan Speaker/Tuan Pengurusi (informal and within the House)
- Member of: Committee of Selection, Standing Orders Committee, House Committee, Committee of Privileges
- Reports to: Dewan Rakyat
- Appointer: Elected by members of the Dewan Rakyat
- Term length: Elected at the start of each Parliament, upon a vacancy
- Constituting instrument: Federal Constitution of Malaysia
- Inaugural holder: Mohamad Noah Omar
- Formation: 11 September 1959; 66 years ago
- Deputy: Deputy Speaker of the Dewan Rakyat
- Salary: MYR 372,000 annually
- Website: Parliament of Malaysia

The Speaker of the Dewan Rakyat (Malay: Yang di-Pertua Dewan Rakyat, Jawi: يڠ دڤرتوا ديوان رعيت) is the highest-ranking presiding officer of the Dewan Rakyat, the lower house of the Parliament of Malaysia. They are responsible for convening sessions of the Dewan Rakyat, organising debates, and examining the admissibility of petitions, bills, and amendments. In the absence of the Speaker, one of their deputies will take their place.

The current speaker is Johari Abdul. He was elected on 19 December 2022 for the 15th Malaysian Parliament.

== Functions ==
The Speaker determines when a sitting of the House should open and close, and may suspend the sitting for a brief period of time if necessary. He is also in charge of ensuring the Constitution and Standing Orders of the House are given due respect; disciplining members of the House; determining who shall have the floor during a sitting; calling a vote; and checking for a quorum when the House meets. He only participates in a vote when there is a tie. The Speaker also has powers some allege to be excessive, such as imposing limits on the posing of supplementary questions during Question Time — an important procedure for the legislature to examine the government's actions — the power to restrict the tabling of questions for Question Time, and the power to amend written copies of speeches made by members of the House before they are given verbally.

== Speaker election ==
The Speaker is elected to a term that lasts for the length of the term of the Dewan Rakyat that elected him. His term ends when the House is dissolved and a general election is called. He is elected when the House meets for the first time after a general election by the members of the House, who are called MPs. Any MP is qualified to be the Speaker of the House, but non-MPs who meet the same qualifications required to be an MP are also eligible for election as Speaker. A candidate for Speaker must be nominated and seconded by at least two MPs other than himself. This nomination process must be conducted at least 14 days before the election of the Speaker. If only one candidate meets these conditions, he is automatically elected Speaker; otherwise, voting by secret ballot is conducted, with the winner decided by a simple majority. Two deputy Speakers are elected in a similar manner.

The Secretary (Malay:Setiausaha) of the House presides over the voting.

== List of speakers of the Dewan Rakyat ==
No.	Portrait	Name (Birth–Death) (Constituency)	Term of office			Party	Parliament
No.	Portrait	Name (Birth–Death) (Constituency)	Took office	Left office	Time in office	Party	Parliament
1		Tan Sri Dato' Haji; Mohamed Noah Omar (1897–1991); MP for Johore Bahru Timor	11 September 1959	17 May 1964	4 years, 250 days	Alliance (UMNO)	1st
2		Dato'; Syed Esa Alwee; MP for Batu Pahat Dalam	18 May 1964	24 November 1964	191 days	Alliance (UMNO)	2nd
3		Tan Sri Dato'; Chik Mohamad Yusuf (1907–1975); Non-MP	25 November 1964	3 November 1974	9 years, 344 days	Alliance (UMNO)	–
3		Tan Sri Dato'; Chik Mohamad Yusuf (1907–1975); Non-MP	25 November 1964	3 November 1974	9 years, 344 days	Alliance (UMNO)	3rd
4		Tan Sri Dato' Haji; Nik Ahmad Kamil (1909–1977); Non-MP	4 November 1974	19 December 1977	3 years, 46 days	BN (UMNO)	4th
5		Tun Dr. Syed Nasir Ismail (1921–1982); MP for Pagoh (until 1978); Non-MP	21 December 1977	16 March 1982	4 years, 86 days	BN (UMNO)	–
5		Tun Dr. Syed Nasir Ismail (1921–1982); MP for Pagoh (until 1978); Non-MP	21 December 1977	16 March 1982	4 years, 86 days	BN (UMNO)	5th
6		Tun Dr. Mohamed Zahir Ismail (1924–2004); Non-MP	14 June 1982	14 October 2004	22 years, 123 days	BN (UMNO)	6th
6		Tun Dr. Mohamed Zahir Ismail (1924–2004); Non-MP	14 June 1982	14 October 2004	22 years, 123 days	BN (UMNO)	7th
6		Tun Dr. Mohamed Zahir Ismail (1924–2004); Non-MP	14 June 1982	14 October 2004	22 years, 123 days	BN (UMNO)	8th
6		Tun Dr. Mohamed Zahir Ismail (1924–2004); Non-MP	14 June 1982	14 October 2004	22 years, 123 days	BN (UMNO)	9th
6		Tun Dr. Mohamed Zahir Ismail (1924–2004); Non-MP	14 June 1982	14 October 2004	22 years, 123 days	BN (UMNO)	10th
6		Tun Dr. Mohamed Zahir Ismail (1924–2004); Non-MP	14 June 1982	14 October 2004	22 years, 123 days	BN (UMNO)	11th
7		Tan Sri Dato' Seri Diraja; Ramli Ngah Talib (born 1941); MP for Pasir Salak	22 November 2004	27 April 2008	3 years, 158 days	BN (UMNO)	–
8		Tan Sri Datuk Seri Panglima; Pandikar Amin Mulia (born 1955); Non-MP	28 April 2008	15 July 2018	10 years, 79 days	BN (UMNO)	12th
8		Tan Sri Datuk Seri Panglima; Pandikar Amin Mulia (born 1955); Non-MP	28 April 2008	15 July 2018	10 years, 79 days	BN (UMNO)	13th
9		Tan Sri Dato'; Mohamad Ariff Md Yusof (born 1949); Non-MP	16 July 2018	13 July 2020	1 year, 364 days	PH (AMANAH)	14th
10		Tan Sri; Azhar Azizan Harun (born 1962); Non-MP	13 July 2020	18 December 2022	2 years, 159 days	Independent	–
11		Tan Sri Dato' (Dr.); Johari Abdul (born 1955); Non-MP	19 December 2022	Incumbent	3 years, 264 days	PH (PKR)	15th

=== Election results ===
Election Date	Candidates	Votes	Nominated by	Seconded by	Secretary
11 September 1959	Mohamad Noah Omar	Unopposed	Tunku Abdul Rahman	Teoh Chze Chong	C. A. Frederick
18 May 1964	Syed Esa Alwee	Unopposed	Tunku Abdul Rahman	Asri Muda	Sheikh Abdullah Sheikh Abu Bakar
25 November 1964	Chik Mohamad Yusuf Sheikh Abdul Rahman	Unopposed	Tunku Abdul Rahman	Ng Kam Poh	Sheikh Abdullah Sheikh Abu Bakar
20 February 1971	Chik Mohamad Yusuf Sheikh Abdul Rahman	Unopposed	Abdul Razak Hussein	Nik Ahmad Kamil Nik Mahmood	Ahmad Abdullah
4 November 1974	Nik Ahmad Kamil Nik Mahmood	Unopposed	Abdul Razak Hussein	Hussein Onn	Azizul Rahman Abdul Aziz
9 January 1978	Syed Nasir Ismail	Unopposed	Hussein Onn	Lee San Choon	Azizul Rahman Abdul Aziz
31 July 1978	Syed Nasir Ismail	Unopposed	Hussein Onn	Lee San Choon	Azizul Rahman Abdul Aziz
14 June 1982	Mohamed Zahir Ismail	Unopposed	Mahathir Mohamad	Musa Hitam	Azizul Rahman Abdul Aziz
6 October 1986	Mohamed Zahir Ismail	Unopposed	Mahathir Mohamad	Ling Liong Sik	Azizul Rahman Abdul Aziz
3 December 1990	Mohamed Zahir Ismail	Unopposed	Mahathir Mohamad	Ling Liong Sik	Wan Zahir Sheikh Abdul Rahman
7 June 1995	Mohamed Zahir Ismail	Unopposed	Mahathir Mohamad	Ling Liong Sik	Abdul Rahman Ali
20 December 1999	Mohamed Zahir Ismail	Unopposed	Mahathir Mohamad	Ling Liong Sik	Mohd. Salleh Hassan
17 May 2004	Mohamed Zahir Ismail	Unopposed	Abdullah Ahmad Badawi	Najib Razak	Abdullah Abdul Wahab
22 November 2004	Ramli Ngah Talib	185	Abdullah Ahmad Badawi	Ong Ka Ting	Abdullah Abdul Wahab
22 November 2004	Tan Seng Giaw	10	Lim Kit Siang	Kulasegaran Murugeson	Abdullah Abdul Wahab
28 April 2008	Pandikar Amin Mulia	Unopposed	Abdullah Ahmad Badawi	Najib Razak	Roosme Hamzah
24 June 2013	Pandikar Amin Mulia	133	Najib Razak	Muhyiddin Yassin	Roosme Hamzah
24 June 2013	Abdul Kadir Sulaiman	89	Abdul Khalid Ibrahim	Karpal Singh	Roosme Hamzah
16 July 2018	Mohamad Ariff Md Yusof	Unopposed	Mahathir Mohamad	Wan Azizah Wan Ismail	Roosme Hamzah
13 July 2020	Azhar Azizan Harun	Unopposed	Muhyiddin Yassin	Mohamed Azmin Ali	Nizam Mydin Bacha Mydin
19 December 2022	Johari Abdul	147	Anwar Ibrahim	Ahmad Zahid Hamidi	Nizam Mydin Bacha Mydin
19 December 2022	Mohd Radzi Sheikh Ahmad	74	Hamzah Zainudin	Takiyuddin Hassan	Nizam Mydin Bacha Mydin

== See also ==
- Dewan Rakyat
- Parliament of Malaysia
- President of the Dewan Negara
