= Hilir Perak (federal constituency) =

Perak constituency

Defunct federal constituency
- Legislature: Dewan Rakyat
- Constituency created: 1958
- Constituency abolished: 1986
- First contested: 1959
- Last contested: 1982

Hilir Perak was a federal constituency in Perak, Malaysia, that was represented in the Dewan Rakyat from 1959 to 1986.

The federal constituency was created in the 1958 redistribution and was mandated to return a single member to the Dewan Rakyat under the first past the post voting system.

== History ==
It was abolished in 1986 when it was redistributed.

=== Representation history ===
Members of Parliament for Hilir Perak
Parliament	No	Years	Member	Party	Vote Share
Constituency created from Sungei Perak Hilir
Parliament of the Federation of Malaya
1st	P054	1959-1963	Mohamed Abbas Ahmad (محمد عباس احمد)	Alliance (UMNO)	4,818; 53.00%
Parliament of Malaysia
1st	P054	1963-1964	Mohamed Abbas Ahmad (محمد عباس احمد)	Alliance (UMNO)	4,818; 53.00%
2nd	P054	1964-1969	Othman Abdullah (عثمان عبدالله)	Alliance (UMNO)	7,883; 65.13%
		1969-1971	Parliament was suspended		
3rd	P054	1971-1973	Ahmad Damanhuri Abdul Wahab (احمد دامنهوري عبدالوهاب)	Alliance (UMNO)	7,302; 59.75%
3rd	P054	1973-1974	Ahmad Damanhuri Abdul Wahab (احمد دامنهوري عبدالوهاب)	BN (UMNO)	7,302; 59.75%
4th	P061	1974-1978	Abu Bakar Arshad (ابو بكر ارشد)	BN (UMNO)	13,077; 72.64%
5th	P061	1978-1982	Kamaluddin Maamor (كمالو الدين معمور)	BN (UMNO)	13,643; 64.07%
6th	P061	1982-1986	Megat Junid Megat Ayub (مڬت جونيد مڬت ايوب)	BN (UMNO)	16,582; 73.24%
Constituency abolished, renamed to Pasir Salak

=== State constituency ===
Parliamentary constituency	State constituency						
Parliamentary constituency	1955–59*	1959–1974	1974–1986	1986–1995	1995–2004	2004–2018	2018–present
Hilir Perak		Bandar					
Hilir Perak			Kampong Gajah				
Hilir Perak		Sungei Manik					

=== Historical boundaries ===
State Constituency	Area	
State Constituency	1959	1974
Bandar	Changkat Lada; Kampung Gajah; Kampung Tersusun Air Kuning; Kota Setia; Sungai Durian	
Kampong Gajah		Bota; Lambor Kanan; Lambor Kiri; Seri Iskandar; Tronoh Mines
Sungei Manik	Chenderong Balai; Chikus; Kampung Sungai Tukang Sidin; Kampung Tanjung Keramat; Sungai Manik	Chenderong Balai; Chikus; Chui Chak; Kampung Tanjung Keramat; Langkap

== Election results ==
Malaysian general election, 1982
Party	Candidate	Votes	%	∆%
BN	Megat Junid Megat Ayub	16,582	73.24	▲9.17
PAS	Ahmad Abdul Majid	6,058	26.76	▲4.14
Total valid votes		22,640	100.00	
Total rejected ballots		1,392		
Unreturned ballots		0		
Turnout		24,032	72.99	▼0.79
Registered electors		32,925		
Majority		10,524	46.48	▲5.03
BN hold		Swing		

Malaysian general election, 1978
Party	Candidate	Votes	%	∆%
BN	Kamaluddin Maamor	13,643	64.07	▼8.57
PAS	Abdul Kader Kahar	4,817	22.62	▲22.62
DAP	Zainal Abidin Adnan	2,493	11.71	▲11.71
PEKEMAS	Abdul Latif Nasain	342	1.61	▲1.61
Total valid votes		21,295	100.00	
Total rejected ballots		719		
Unreturned ballots		0		
Turnout		22,014	73.78	▲2.68
Registered electors		29,838		
Majority		8,826	41.45	▼3.83
BN hold		Swing		

Malaysian general election, 1974
Party	Candidate	Votes	%	∆%
BN	Abu Bakar Arshad	13,077	72.64	▲72.64
PEKEMAS	Ahmad Boestamam	4,925	27.36	▲27.36
Total valid votes		18,002	100.00	
Total rejected ballots		1,317		
Unreturned ballots		0		
Turnout		19,319	71.10	▼2.53
Registered electors		26,524		
Majority		8,152	45.28	▲25.78
BN gain from Alliance		Swing		?

Malaysian general election, 1969
Party	Candidate	Votes	%	∆%
Alliance	Ahmad Damanhuri Abdul Wahab	7,302	59.75	▼5.38
PMIP	Abdul Aziz Othman	4,919	40.25	▲8.48
Total valid votes		12,221	100.00	
Total rejected ballots		815		
Unreturned ballots		0		
Turnout		13,036	73.63	▼6.20
Registered electors		17,705		
Majority		2,383	19.50	▼13.86
Alliance hold		Swing		

Malaysian general election, 1964
Party	Candidate	Votes	%	∆%
Alliance	Othman Abdullah	7,883	65.13	▲8.13
PMIP	Hassan Adli Arshad	3,845	31.77	▼3.30
UDP	Ja'afar Sidik Maamor	375	3.10	▲3.10
Total valid votes		12,103	100.00	
Total rejected ballots		514		
Unreturned ballots		0		
Turnout		12,617	79.83	▲9.04
Registered electors		15,805		
Majority		4,038	33.36	▲27.36
Alliance hold		Swing		

Malayan general election, 1959
Party	Candidate	Votes	%
Alliance	Mohamed Abbas Ahmad	4,818	53.00
PMIP	Abu Bakar Anjang	4,273	47.00
Total valid votes		9,091	100.00
Total rejected ballots		100	
Unreturned ballots		0	
Turnout		9,191	70.79
Registered electors		12,984	
Majority		545	6.00
This was a new constituency created.
