= Megat Junid =

Malaysian politician

Yang Berbahagia Tan Sri Dato' Seri Megat Junid Megat Ayub PSM SPMP SPDK DPMK DSSA DPCM DSAP AMP

Minister of Domestic Trade and Consumer Affairs
- In office 2 May 1997 – 14 December 1999
- Monarchs: Ja'afar; Salahuddin
- Prime Minister: Mahathir Mohamad
- Deputy: Subramaniam Sinniah
- Preceded by: Abu Hassan Omar
- Succeeded by: Muhyiddin Yassin
- Constituency: Pasir Salak

Deputy Minister of Home Affairs
- In office 11 August 1986 – 2 July 1997 Serving with Ong Ka Ting (1995-1997)
- Monarchs: Iskandar; Azlan Shah; Ja'afar
- Prime Minister: Mahathir Mohamad
- Minister: Mahathir Mohamad
- Preceded by: Mohd. Kassim Ahmed
- Succeeded by: Azmi Khalid
- Constituency: Pasir Salak

Deputy Minister of Primary Industries
- In office 22 April 1982 – 2 August 1986
- Monarchs: Ahmad Shah; Iskandar
- Prime Minister: Mahathir Mohamad
- Minister: Paul Leong Khee Seong
- Preceded by: Bujang Ulis
- Succeeded by: Mohd Radzi Sheikh Ahmad
- Constituency: Hilir Perak

Member of the Malaysian Parliament for Pasir Salak
- In office 1986 – 29 November 1999
- Preceded by: Constituency established
- Succeeded by: Ramli Ngah Talib
- Majority: 11,950 (1986); 13,302 (1990); 17,715 (1995)

Member of the Malaysian Parliament for Hilir Perak
- In office 1982–1986
- Preceded by: Kamaluddin Maamor
- Succeeded by: Constituency abolished
- Majority: 10.524 (1982)

Personal details
- Born: Megat Junid bin Megat Ayub; 8 December 1942 Teluk Intan, Perak, British Malaya (now Malaysia)
- Died: 24 January 2008 (aged 65) Bangsar, Kuala Lumpur, Malaysia
- Resting place: Bukit Kiara Muslim Cemetery, Kuala Lumpur
- Citizenship: Malaysian
- Party: United Malays National Organisation (UMNO)
- Other political affiliations: Barisan Nasional (BN)
- Spouse: Ziela Jalil
- Children: Megat Firdouz Megat Junid
- Education: University of Malaya
- Occupation: Politician
- Profession: Teacher

Megat Junid bin Megat Ayub (8 December 1942 – 24 January 2008) was a Malaysian politician and direct descendant of Megat Terawis, a Bendahara of Perak.

== Early life ==
Junid was born in Teluk Intan in 1942.

== Politics ==
Megat Junid was a teacher by profession and first met Prime Minister Mahathir Mohamad in the early 1970s. Mahathir was living in exile for criticising then Prime Minister Tunku Abdul Rahman at the time of their meeting. Junid soon left teaching to become Mahathir's special assistant.

Junid was first elected as a Malaysian Member of Parliament at the same time that Mahathir became the Prime Minister of the country. He was appointed Deputy Minister of Primary Industries in Mahathir's government, just two years later.

In 1986, Mahathir next appointed Junid to be his deputy in the Ministry of Home Affairs.

Junid was appointed to become Malaysia's Minister of Domestic Trade and Consumer Affairs in 1997.He served in the post for two years.

== Death ==
Megat Junid died on 24 January 2008, aged 65, at the Pantai Medical Centre in Bangsar following a battle with prostate cancer. His body was buried at Bukit Kiara Muslim Cemetery in Kuala Lumpur, Malaysia. He was a resident of Kelana Jaya.

== Election results ==
Parliament of Malaysia
Year	Constituency	Candidate	Votes	Pct	Opponent(s)	Votes	Pct	Ballots cast	Majority	Turnout
1982	P061 Hilir Perak	Megat Junid Megat Ayub (UMNO)	16,582	73.24%	Ahmad Abdul Majid (PAS)	6,058	26.76%	24,032	10,524	72.99%
1986	P067 Pasir Salak	Megat Junid Megat Ayub (UMNO)	17,951	74.95%	Ali Daud (PAS)	6,001	25.05%	24,849	11,950	67.99%
1990	P067 Pasir Salak	Megat Junid Megat Ayub (UMNO)	19,787	75.32%	Rosli Samsudin (PAS)	6,485	24.68%	27,306	13,302	50.64%
1995	P070 Pasir Salak	Megat Junid Megat Ayub (UMNO)	21,690	82.58%	Mohd Rus Jaafar (PAS)	4,575	17.42%	27,822	17,115	65.97%

== Honours ==
=== Honours of Malaysia ===
- Malaysia
  - Commander of the Order of Loyalty to the Crown of Malaysia (PSM) – Tan Sri (2000)
- Perak
  - Member of the Order of the Perak State Crown (AMP) (1979)
  - Knight Commander of the Order of Cura Si Manja Kini (DPCM) – Dato' (1986)
  - Knight Grand Commander of the Order of the Perak State Crown (SPMP) – Dato' Seri (1998)
- Pahang
  - Knight Companion of the Order of Sultan Ahmad Shah of Pahang (DSAP) – Dato' (1988)
- Selangor
  - Knight Companion of the Order of Sultan Salahuddin Abdul Aziz Shah (DSSA) – Dato' (1992)
- Sabah
  - Grand Commander of the Order of Kinabalu (SPDK) – Datuk Seri Panglima (1996)
- Kelantan
  - Knight Commander of the Order of the Crown of Kelantan (DPMK) – Dato' (1997)
