= Chik Mohamad Yusuf =

Malaysian politician (1907–1975)

Yang Berbahagia Tan Sri Dato' Seri Chik Mohamad Yusuf Sheikh Abdul Rahman PMN SPCM SPMP
- چئ محمد يوسف شيخ عبدالرحمن

3rd Speaker of the Dewan Rakyat
- In office 25 November 1964 – 1 March 1974
- Monarchs: Putra; Ismail Nasiruddin; Abdul Halim
- Prime Minister: Tunku Abdul Rahman; Abdul Razak Hussein
- Preceded by: Syed Esa Alwee
- Succeeded by: Nik Ahmad Kamil Nik Mahmud

Personal details
- Born: 3 March 1907
- Died: 26 June 1975 (aged 68)
- Spouse: Zainab Mohd. Rashid
- Parents: Sheikh Abdul Rahman (father); Mariam Kulop Mohd Yusuff (mother)

Tan Sri Dato' Seri Chik Mohamad Yusuf bin Sheikh Abdul Rahman (3 March 1907 – 26 June 1975), better known as C.M. Yusuf, was the third Speaker of the Dewan Rakyat, the lower house in the Malaysian Parliament.

The school SMK Dato' Bendahara C.M Yusuf in Tanjung Tualang, Batu Gajah, Perak is named after him. A road in Ipoh that interconnects Jalan Raja Permaisuri Bainun and the Yeoh Hong Seng Fountain (roundabout), was also named after him.

== Biography ==
C.M. Yusuf received his Bachelor of Arts from the University of Oxford. He was an Orang Besar (traditional positions of authority appointed by the royalty) in the state of Perak, having been conferred the title "Dato' Bendahara Perak" by the Sultan of Perak, Sultan Yusuf Izzuddin Shah, in 1959.

Prior to being elected Speaker, C.M. Yusuf served important positions in the legislature of Malaysia. He was a member of the Malayan Federal Legislative Council, the predecessor to the present-day Parliament, before the independence of Malaya in 1957. He was also a Senator from the state of Perak in the Dewan Negara.

He was elected Speaker of the Dewan Rakyat on 25 November 1964 and served for nearly ten years.

== Honour ==
=== Honour of Malaysia ===
- Malaysia
  - Commander of the Order of the Defender of the Realm (PMN) – Tan Sri (1972)
- Perak
  - Knight Grand Commander of the Order of Cura Si Manja Kini (SPCM) – Dato' Seri (1974)
  - Knight Grand Commander of the Order of the Perak State Crown (SPMP) – Dato' Seri (1957)

Political offices
Preceded by Syed Esa Alwee	Speaker of the Dewan Rakyat; 1964–1974	Succeeded by Nik Ahmad Kamil Nik Mahmud
