= Mohamed Zahir Ismail =

Malaysian lawyer and politician

Yang Amat Berbahagia Tun Dato' Seri Mohamed Zahir Ismail SSM SSDK SPMK PMN DSDK JMN PPM
- محمد ظاهر إسماعيل

6th Speaker of the Dewan Rakyat
- In office 14 June 1982 – 14 October 2004
- Monarchs: Ahmad Shah; Iskandar; Azlan Shah; Ja'afar; Salahuddin; Sirajuddin
- Prime Minister: Mahathir Mohamad (1982–2003); Abdullah Ahmad Badawi (2003–2004)
- Deputy: Hee Tien Lai (1982–1983); Abdul Hamid Pawanteh (1984–1986); D. P. Vijandran; Mohamed Amin Daud (1986–1990); Ong Tee Keat; Juhar Mahiruddin (1990–1999); Lim Si Cheng; Muhammad Abdullah (1999–2004); Lim Si Cheng; Yusof Yacob (2004–2004)
- Preceded by: Syed Nasir Ismail
- Succeeded by: Ramli Ngah Talib

Personal details
- Born: 19 March 1924 Alor Setar, Kedah, Unfederated Malay States, British Malaya (now Malaysia)
- Died: 14 October 2004 (aged 80) Kuala Lumpur, Malaysia
- Resting place: Section 21 Muslim Cemetery, Shah Alam, Selangor
- Party: United Malays National Organisation
- Other political affiliations: Barisan Nasional
- Spouse: Halimatun Sa'adiah Chik
- Profession: Advocate, solicitor

Mohamed Zahir bin Ismail (19 March 1924 – 14 October 2004) was a Malaysian lawyer and politician who served as the Speaker of the Dewan Rakyat, the lower chamber of the Malaysian Parliament from June 1982 to his death in October 2004. He was the longest-serving officeholder by serving for 22 years, 4 months. He was also the first Chancellor of the International Medical University from 1999 to 2004.

== Early life and education ==
Mohamed Zahir was born in Alor Setar, Kedah. He attended Sekolah Kebangsaan Hosba in Jitra and later Kolej Sultan Abdul Hamid, Alor Setar. He obtained his Bachelor of Laws from Lincoln's Inn in 1955.

== Career ==
Mohamed Zahir began practising as a lawyer from 1956. After the independence of Malaya, he served as the Kedah State EXCO from 1959 to 1963, and briefly as Menteri Besar in 1963. He was appointed to the Dewan Negara (the upper house) in August 1963, and completed two terms (of three years each) as a Senator.

He was actively involved in the formation of the Malaysia, serving as a diplomat to the United Nations and as the Malayan representative to the Cobbold Commission. In 1975, he was appointed to the Kota Bharu High Court as a judge.

Now a respected figure in Malaysian politics, he was elected Speaker of the Dewan Rakyat following the 1982 general elections, a post he held for 22 years. During his tenure, he also became President of the Commonwealth Parliamentary Association, Asia Pacific Parliamentary Forum and the ASEAN Inter Parliamentary Assembly.

== Death ==
In October 2004, Mohamed Zahir died in office due to acute renal failure in Kuala Lumpur General Hospital. He was laid to rest beside the grave of his wife, Toh Puan Halimatun Saadiah Chik, at the Section 21 Muslim burial ground in Shah Alam, Selangor.

== Election results ==
Kedah State Legislative Assembly
Year	Constituency	Candidate	Votes	Pct	Opponent(s)	Votes	Pct	Ballots cast	Majority	Turnout
1959	N14 Kota	Mohamed Zahir Ismail (UMNO)								

Parliament of Malaysia
Year	Constituency	Candidate	Votes	Pct	Opponent(s)	Votes	Pct	Ballots cast	Majority	Turnout
1964	P012 Sungei Patani	Mohamed Zahir Ismail (UMNO)	14,177	70.23%	Teh Pek Choon (SF)	3,680	18.22%	20,714	10,497	76.28%
1964	P012 Sungei Patani	Mohamed Zahir Ismail (UMNO)	14,177	70.23%	Syed Jan Aljeffri (PMIP)	1,176	5.83%	20,714	10,497	76.28%
1964	P012 Sungei Patani	Mohamed Zahir Ismail (UMNO)	14,177	70.23%	Ong Boon Seong (UDP)	1,154	5.72%	20,714	10,497	76.28%

== Honours ==
=== Honours of Malaysia ===
- Malaysia
  - Companion of the Order of the Defender of the Realm (JMN) (1963)
  - Malaysian Commemorative Medal (Silver) (PPM) (1965)
  - Commander of the Order of the Defender of the Realm (PMN) – Tan Sri (1984)
  - Grand Commander of the Order of Loyalty to the Crown of Malaysia (SSM) – Tun (1998)
- Kelantan
  - Knight Grand Commander of the Order of the Crown of Kelantan (SPMK) – Dato' (1981)
- Kedah
  - Knight Companion of the Order of Loyalty to the Royal House of Kedah (DSDK) – Dato'
  - Knight Grand Companion of the Order of Loyalty to the Royal House of Kedah (SSDK) – Dato' Seri (2002)

Political offices
Preceded by Syed Nasir Ismail	Speaker of the Dewan Rakyat; 1982–2004	Succeeded by Ramli Ngah Talib
