= Ramli Ngah Talib =

Malaysian politician

Tuan Yang Terutama Tun Dato' Seri Utama Ramli Ngah Talib SMN PSM DUPN SPSA SPCM JP
- رملي ڠه طالب

9th Governor of Penang
- Incumbent
- Assumed office 1 May 2025
- Chief Minister: Chow Kon Yeow
- Preceded by: Ahmad Fuzi Abdul Razak

7th Speaker of the Dewan Rakyat
- In office 22 November 2004 – 13 February 2008
- Monarchs: Sirajuddin; Mizan Zainal Abidin
- Prime Minister: Abdullah Ahmad Badawi
- Deputy: Lim Si Cheng; Yusof Yacob
- Preceded by: Mohamed Zahir Ismail
- Succeeded by: Pandikar Amin Mulia
- Constituency: Pasir Salak

Deputy Minister of Transport
- In office 15 December 1999 – 26 March 2004 Serving with Douglas Uggah Embas
- Monarchs: Salahuddin; Sirajuddin
- Prime Minister: Mahathir Mohamad; Abdullah Ahmad Badawi
- Preceded by: Ibrahim Saad
- Succeeded by: Tengku Azlan Sultan Abu Bakar
- Constituency: Pasir Salak

8th Menteri Besar of Perak
- In office 1 March 1983 – 2 December 1999
- Monarchs: Idris II; Azlan Shah
- Prime Minister: Mahathir Mohamad
- Preceded by: Wan Mohamed Wan Teh
- Succeeded by: Tajol Rosli Mohd Ghazali

Personal details
- Born: Ramli bin Ngah Talib; 16 March 1941 (age 85) Pasir Salak, Perak, British Malaya (now Malaysia)
- Citizenship: Malaysian
- Party: United Malays National Organisation (UMNO) (1973–present)
- Other political affiliations: Barisan Nasional (BN) (1973–present)
- Spouse: Raja Noora Ashikin Raja Abdullah
- Children: 4
- Education: Malay College Kuala Kangsar; Queen's University Belfast (LLB)
- Occupation: Politician
- Profession: Lawyer

Ramli bin Ngah Talib (Jawi: رملي بن ڠه طالب; born 16 March 1941) is a Malaysian politician and lawyer who has served as the 9th Governor of Penang since 1 May 2025. He served as the 8th Menteri Besar of Perak from March 1982 until December 1999 and Speaker of the Dewan Rakyat from November 2004 until February 2008. He is a member of the United Malays National Organisation, a component party of the Barisan Nasional (BN) coalition.

== Early life and education ==
Born in Pasir Salak, Perak, Malaysia, Ramli Ngah Talib was raised in a rural village environment. His ancestors, including his great-grandfather Tok Anjang Pelita and great-great-grandfather Dato' Sagor, were among several individuals involved in the 1875 incident that resulted in the death of J. W. W. Birch, the first British Resident of Perak.

Ramli received his early education in Malay College Kuala Kangsar (MCKK) based on his academic qualifications. He later pursued legal studies at Queen's University Belfast, where he earned a Bachelor of Laws (LLB), followed by a Barrister-at-Law qualification from Lincoln's Inn, London. During the 1960s in the United Kingdom, he was active in student organisations, serving as political secretary and magazine editor for the Kesatuan Melayu United Kingdom (United Kingdom Malay Students Association) based in London.

== Legal career ==
Upon returning to Malaysia, Ramli served as a law lecturer at Institut Teknologi MARA (now Universiti Teknologi MARA) and as a part-time lecturer at the University of Malaya in the early 1970s. In 1971, he became the first in-house legal advisor for Lembaga Letrik Negara (now Tenaga Nasional Berhad) and was admitted as an advocate and solicitor of the High Court of Malaya. He began practising law at Kadir, Tan & Ramli, a firm he co-founded in 1977. During this period, he was appointed to the Board of Directors of Utusan Melayu and also served on the Board of Directors of Lembaga Letrik Negara (now Tenaga Nasional Berhad).

== Political career ==
Ramli held several political and public service positions throughout his career. He served as the Chairman of the Perak UMNO Liaison Committee from 1984 to 2000 and was a member of the UMNO Supreme Council between 1980 and 2006. In 2014, he was appointed Pro-Chancellor of the University of Malaya. He is also a permanent member of the Dewan Negara Perak (Privy Council Perak) and holds the hereditary title Orang Kaya-Kaya Seri Agar Diraja (Dato' Sagor), which originates from his ancestor, Dato' Sagor.

Ramli was first elected to the Perak State Assembly for Kampung Gajah in 1978. He later joined the Perak State Executive Council and, during his second term, was appointed as the Menteri Besar (Chief Minister) of Perak. He held this position for over 17 years, making him the longest-serving Menteri Besar in the state's history. In 1999, he was elected as a Member of Parliament (Malaysia) for the Pasir Salak (federal constituency) constituency. During his first term in Parliament, he was appointed Deputy Minister of Transport (Malaysia) and later served as Chairman of the Public Accounts Committee. In 2004, he was elected Speaker of the Dewan Rakyat.

During his tenure as Menteri Besar, several development initiatives were launched. The Pasir Salak Historical Complex was constructed in the early 1990s, comprising 42 wooden dioramas depicting events in Malaysian history. He supported the establishment of higher education institutions in Perak, including efforts to bring Institut Teknologi MARA (now Universiti Teknologi MARA, UiTM) to the state. This included providing rent-free shop lots initially and later allocating land for a permanent campus in Seri Iskandar. Other projects during his tenure included the development of Proton City in Tanjung Malim, Lumut Port, Universiti Pendidikan Sultan Idris (UPSI), and the establishment of Universiti Sains Malaysia facilities (later taken over by PETRONAS University of Technology). His administration also supported rural and industrial development initiatives.

In 1986, a panel of Aceh's customary chiefs awarded him the title Dato' Seri Maharaja Lela Mangkubumi in recognition of efforts to foster relations between Aceh and Perak. In 1996, the University of Sheffield conferred upon him an Honorary Doctor of Laws (LLD) degree for facilitating cooperation between the university and the Perak Medical College in Ipoh.

== Other activities ==
Ramli obtained licenses to fly both types of aircraft in 2002. He is the President of the Perak Aero Club and has held the position of President of the Malaysia Chess Federation since 2007. He was also President of the Perak Football Association, during which the association won its first Malaysia Cup. In 2007, while serving as Speaker of the Parliament of Malaysia, he took time off to climb Gunung Tahan, the highest mountain in Peninsular Malaysia. Additionally, he has engaged in mountain trekking in Norway, Bhutan, Nepal, Indonesia, and Oman.

In his literary pursuits, Ramli wrote a book entitled Pasir Salak: Sehamparan Sejarah Perjuangan during his time as Menteri Besar of Perak. The book focuses on the Malay rebellion against British rule in Perak in 1875. He also produced various pamphlets and booklets promoting tourism in Pasir Salak and the wider Perak region. In 2010, he published Meniti Zaman (Going Through Eras), a reflection on rural life in Malaysia during and after the Japanese occupation of Malaya. His book Mr. Speaker, Sir; From Kampung Boy to the Helm of Parliament was released in 2012, providing an account of his experiences and observations in the Malaysian Parliament. His most recent publication, The Malays, Pathfinders and Trailblazers, is a 530-page work that details the historical achievements of the Malays and took four years to complete. He has also contributed articles to the Commonwealth Parliamentary Association magazine.

== Personal life ==
Ramli is married to Toh Puan Raja Dato’ Seri Utama Noora Ashikin binti Raja Abdullah and they have four children.

== Election results ==
Parliament of Malaysia
Year	Constituency	Candidate	Votes	Pct	Opponent(s)	Votes	Pct	Ballots cast	Majority	Turnout
1999	P070 Pasir Salak	Ramli Ngah Talib (UMNO)	16,792	58.84%	Osman Abdul Rahman (KeADILan)	11,747	41.16%	29,649	5,045	68.58%
2004	P073 Pasir Salak	Ramli Ngah Talib (UMNO)	19,422	64.11%	Muhaimin Sulam (PAS)	10,875	35.89%	31,310	8,547	72.88%

Perak State Legislative Assembly
Year	Constituency	Candidate	Votes	Pct	Opponent(s)	Votes	Pct	Ballots cast	Majority	Turnout
1978	N35 Kampong Gajah	Ramli Ngah Talib (UMNO)								
1982	N35 Kampong Gajah	Ramli Ngah Talib (UMNO)								
1986	N38 Kampong Gajah	Ramli Ngah Talib (UMNO)	9,538	78.44%	Mokhtar Ngah Ibrahim (PAS)	1,950	16.04%	12,159	7,588	66.27%
1990	N38 Kampong Gajah	Ramli Ngah Talib (UMNO)	11,579	82.28%	Arifen Esa (S46)	1,792	12.73%	14,073	9,787	70.87%
1995	N43 Kampong Gajah	Ramli Ngah Talib (UMNO)	11,718	84.03%	Ahmad Mustafa Abdullah (S46)	1,598	11.46%	13,945	10,120	64.62%

== Honours ==
=== Honours of Malaysia ===
- Malaysia
  - Grand Commander of the Order of the Defender of the Realm (SMN) – Tun (2025)
  - Commander of the Order of Loyalty to the Crown of Malaysia (PSM) – Tan Sri (1989)
  - Member of the Order of the Defender of the Realm (AMN) (1980)
  - Recipient of the 9th Yang di-Pertuan Agong Installation Medal (1989)
  - Recipient of the 10th Yang di-Pertuan Agong Installation Medal (1994)
- Penang
  - Grand Master and Knight Grand Commander of the Order of the Defender of State (DUPN) – Dato' Seri Utama (2025)
- Perak
  - Ordinary Class of the Perak Family Order of Sultan Azlan Shah (SPSA) – Dato' Seri DiRaja (2000)
  - Knight Grand Commander of the Order of Cura Si Manja Kini (SPCM) – Dato' Seri (1984)
  - Commander of the Order of Cura Si Manja Kini (PCM) (1982)
  - Justice of the Peace (JP) (1986)
  - Recipient of the Sultan Azlan Shah Installation Medal (1985)
  - Recipient of the Sultan Azlan Shah Silver Jubilee Medal (2009)
  - Recipient of the Sultan Nazrin Shah Installation Medal (2015)
- Selangor
  - Recipient of the Sultan Salahuddin Silver Jubilee Medal (1985)

Parliament of Malaysia
Preceded by Megat Junid Megat Ayub	Member of the Dewan Rakyat for Pasir Salak; 29 November 1999 - 7 March 2008	Succeeded by Tajuddin Abdul Rahman
Political offices
Preceded by Wan Mohamed Wan Teh	Chief Minister of Perak; 1 March 1983– 3 December 1999	Succeeded by Tajol Rosli Mohd Ghazali
Preceded by Ibrahim Saad	Deputy Minister of Transport; 15 December 1999 - 26 March 2004; From 2001 Serving with Douglas Uggah Embas	Succeeded by Tengku Azlan Sultan Abu Bakar
Preceded by Jamaluddin Jarjis	Chairman of the Public Accounts Committee; 24 May 2004 - 21 November 2004; 11th Malaysian Parliament	Succeeded by Shahrir Abdul Samad
Preceded by Mohamed Zahir Ismail	Speaker of the Dewan Rakyat; 22 November 2004 - 13 February 2008	Succeeded by Pandikar Amin Mulia
Preceded by Ahmad Fuzi Abdul Razak	Yang di-Pertua Negeri of Penang; 1 May 2025 - Present	Succeeded by Incumbent
