= Kulai (federal constituency) =

Federal constituency in Johor, Malaysia

Kulai (P163)
Johor constituency

Federal constituency
- Legislature: Dewan Rakyat
- MP: Teo Nie Ching; PH
- Constituency created: 2003
- First contested: 2004
- Last contested: 2022

Demographics
- Population (2020): 287,404
- Electors (2026): 161,417
- Area (km²): 737
- Pop. density (per km²): 390

Kulai is a federal constituency in Kulai District and Johor Bahru District, Johor, Malaysia, that has been represented in the Dewan Rakyat since 2004.

The federal constituency was created in the 2003 redistribution and is mandated to return a single member to the Dewan Rakyat under the first past the post voting system.

== Demographics ==
Ethnic breakdown of Kulai's electorate as of 2026
1. Chinese (47.3%)
2. Malay (38.6%)
3. Indian (11.6%)
4. Other ethnicities (2.50%)

As of 2020, Kulai has a population of 287,404 people.

Age breakdown of Kulai's electorate as of 2022
1. 18-20 (7.67%)
2. 21-29 (23.4%)
3. 30-39 (19.6%)
4. 40-49 (17.7%)
5. 50-59 (15.2%)
6. 60-69 (9.60%)
7. 70-79 (4.80%)
8. 80-89 (1.70%)
9. above 90 (0.29%)
Gender breakdown of Kulai's electorate as of 2022
1. Male (50.3%)
2. Female (49.7%)

== History ==
=== Polling districts ===
According to the gazette issued on 2 July 2026, the Kulai constituency has a total of 44 polling districts.

State constituency	Polling District	Code	Location
Bukit Permai (N50)	Murni Jaya	163/50/01	SK Murni Jaya
Bukit Permai (N50)	Bukit Permai	163/50/02	SK LKTP Bukit Permai
Bukit Permai (N50)	Inas	163/50/03	SK LKTP Inas
Bukit Permai (N50)	Sedenak Utara	163/50/04	SK Sedenak
Bukit Permai (N50)	Sedenak Selatan	163/50/05	SJK (C) Sedenak
Bukit Permai (N50)	Ladang Fraser	163/50/06	Balai Raya Ladang Fraser
Bukit Permai (N50)	Pekan Sengkang	163/50/07	SJK (C) Sengkang
Bukit Permai (N50)	FELDA Taib Andak	163/50/08	SK Sinar Bahagia
Bukit Permai (N50)	Ladang Swee Lam	163/50/09	SMK Bandar Putra; SK Banadar Putra; SK Putra Utama
Bukit Permai (N50)	Ladang Kelan	163/50/10	SJK (T) Ladang Kelan
Bukit Permai (N50)	Bandar Kulai Utara	163/50/11	Dewan Serbaguna Taman Mewah; Taman Bimbingan Kanak Kanak KEMAS Taman Desa; Balai Serbaguna Taman Saga
Bukit Permai (N50)	Kampong Pertanian	163/50/12	Dewan Serbaguna Kampung Pertanian
Bukit Batu (N51)	Ulu Choh	163/51/01	Dewan Raya Ulu Choh
Bukit Batu (N51)	Bandar Ulu Choh	163/51/02	SJK (C) Ching Yeh
Bukit Batu (N51)	Kampong Rahmat	163/51/03	SK Polis Kem
Bukit Batu (N51)	Bukit Batu	163/51/04	SJK (C) Batu
Bukit Batu (N51)	Ayer Manis	163/51/05	SK Ayer Manis
Bukit Batu (N51)	FELDA Bukit Batu	163/51/06	SK LKTP Bukit Batu
Bukit Batu (N51)	Ayer Bemban	163/51/07	SJK (C) Bemban
Bukit Batu (N51)	Midland Kulai Young	163/51/08	SK Sri Gunung Pulai
Bukit Batu (N51)	Pekan Kelapa Sawit Barat	163/51/09	Sekolah Agama Batu 26
Bukit Batu (N51)	Pekan Kelapa Sawit Tengah	163/51/10	SJK (C) Sawit
Bukit Batu (N51)	Pekan Kelapa Sawit Timor	163/51/11	Tadika Sawit
Bukit Batu (N51)	Kampong Sri Raya	163/51/12	SJK (T) Ladang Kulai Oil Palm
Bukit Batu (N51)	Kota Kulai	163/51/13	SJK (C) Kulai Besar
Bukit Batu (N51)	Taman Putri	163/51/14	SMK Taman Putri
Bukit Batu (N51)	Taman Permai	163/51/15	SMK Kota Kulai
Senai (N52)	Senai Baru	163/52/01	SJK (C) Senai; Dewan Serbaguna Taman Senai Baru
Senai (N52)	Seelong	163/52/02	SJK (C) Seelong
Senai (N52)	UTM	163/52/03	Perpustakaan Raja Zarith Sofiah UTM Skudai
Senai (N52)	Bandar Kulai Barat	163/52/04	SK Kulai
Senai (N52)	Bandar Kulai Tengah	163/52/05	SJK (C) Kulai 1
Senai (N52)	Bandar Kulai Timor	163/52/06	SK Kulai 1
Senai (N52)	Kulai	163/52/07	SA Indahpura; SMK Indahpura (1); SMK Kulai Besar
Senai (N52)	Ladang Kulai Besar	163/52/08	SJK (T) Ladang Kulai Besar
Senai (N52)	Saleng	163/52/09	SJK (C) Saleng
Senai (N52)	Taman Aman	163/52/10	Dewan Serbaguna Taman Aman
Senai (N52)	Bandar Senai Utara	163/52/11	SK Senai Utama
Senai (N52)	Bandar Senai Tengah	163/52/12	SA Senai Utama
Senai (N52)	Bandar Senai Selatan	163/52/13	SK Senai
Senai (N52)	Taman Muhibbah	163/52/14	SK Taman Muhibbah; SA Taman Muhibbah
Senai (N52)	Lengkongan	163/52/15	SMK Sultan Ibrahim
Senai (N52)	Taman Selatan	163/52/16	SMK Tunku Abdul Rahman Putra
Senai (N52)	Dawani	163/52/17	SMK Senai

=== Representation history ===
Members of Parliament for Kulai
Parliament	No	Years	Member	Party	Vote Share
Constituency created, renamed from Senai
11th	P163	2004–2008	Lim Si Cheng (林时清)	BN (MCA)	32,278; 69.55%
12th	P163	2008–2013	Ong Ka Ting (黄家定)	BN (MCA)	32,017; 61.23%
13th	P163	2013–2015	Teo Nie Ching (张念群)	PR (DAP)	43,338; 58.99%
13th	P163	2015–2018	Teo Nie Ching (张念群)	PH (DAP)	43,338; 58.99%
14th	P163	2018–2022	Teo Nie Ching (张念群)	PH (DAP)	55,312; 65.42%
15th	P163	2022–present	Teo Nie Ching (张念群)	PH (DAP)	65,529; 56.86%

=== State constituency ===
Parliamentary constituency	State constituency						
Parliamentary constituency	1954–59*	1959–1974	1974–1986	1986–1995	1995–2004	2004–2018	2018–present
Kulai						Bukit Batu	
Kulai						Bukit Permai	
Kulai						Senai	

=== Historical boundaries ===
State Constituency	Area	
State Constituency	2003	2018
Bukit Batu	Ayer Bemban; Bukit Batu; Scientex Kulai; Taman Putra Kulai; Taman Putri Kulai	Ayer Bemban; Bukit Batu; Kelapa Sawit; Taman Putra Kulai; Ulu Choh
Bukit Permai	Bandar Putra Kulai; Kepala Sawit; Sedenak; Sengkang; Taman Murni Jaya	Bandar Putra Kulai; FELDA Taib Andak; Sedenak; Sengkang; Taman Murni Jaya
Senai	Indahpura; Kulai; Saleng; Seelong; Senai	

=== Current state assembly members ===
No.	State Constituency	Member	Coalition (Party)
N50	Bukit Permai	Mohd Jafni Md Shukor	BN (UMNO)
N51	Bukit Batu	Kumaran Ramakrishnan	BN (MIC)
N52	Senai	Wong Bor Yang	PH (DAP)

=== Local governments & postcodes ===
No.	State Constituency	Local Government	Postcode
N50	Bukit Permai	Kulai Municipal Council	81000 Kulai; 81250 Senai Airport; 81310 UTM; 81400 Senai; 81500 Pekan Nanas; 81850 Layang-Layang; 82100 Ayer Baloi
N51	Bukit Batu	Iskandar Puteri City Council (Ulu Choh area); Kulai Municipal Council	81000 Kulai; 81250 Senai Airport; 81310 UTM; 81400 Senai; 81500 Pekan Nanas; 81850 Layang-Layang; 82100 Ayer Baloi
N52	Senai	Kulai Municipal Council	81000 Kulai; 81250 Senai Airport; 81310 UTM; 81400 Senai; 81500 Pekan Nanas; 81850 Layang-Layang; 82100 Ayer Baloi

== Election results ==
Malaysian general election, 2022
Party	Candidate	Votes	%	∆%
PH	Teo Nie Ching	65,529	56.86	▲56.86
BN	Chua Jian Boon	29,506	25.60	▼1.09
PN	Tan Chen Hok	20,218	17.54	▲17.54
Total valid votes		115,253	100.00	
Total rejected ballots		857		
Unreturned ballots		229		
Turnout		116,339	76.20	▼10.22
Registered electors		151,247		
Majority		36,023	31.26	▼7.47
PH hold		Swing		
Source(s) https://lom.agc.gov.my/ilims/upload/portal/akta/outputp/1753254/PUB%20617%20PARLIMEN%20JOHOR.pdf

Malaysian general election, 2018
Party	Candidate	Votes	%	∆%
PKR	Teo Nie Ching	55,312	65.42	▲65.42
BN	Tang Nai Soon	22,564	26.69	▼14.00
PAS	Juwahir Amin	6,667	7.89	▲7.89
Total valid votes		84,543	100.00	
Total rejected ballots		976		
Unreturned ballots		168		
Turnout		85,687	86.42	▼2.89
Registered electors		99,147		
Majority		32,748	38.73	▲20.43
PKR hold		Swing		
Source(s) "His Majesty's Government Gazette - Notice of Contested Election, Parliament for the State of Johore [P.U. (B) 244/2018]" (PDF). Attorney General's Chambers of Malaysia. 3 May 2018. Archived from the original (PDF) on 2019-12-29. "Federal Government Gazette - Results of Contested Election and Statements of the Poll after the Official Addition of Votes, Parliamentary Constituencies for the State of Johore [P.U. (B) 318/2018]" (PDF). Attorney General's Chambers of Malaysia. 28 May 2018.

Malaysian general election, 2013
Party	Candidate	Votes	%	∆%
DAP	Teo Nie Ching	43,338	58.99	▲20.22
BN	Tay Chin Hein	29,888	40.69	▼20.54
Independent	Surendiran Kuppayah	238	0.32	▲0.32
Total valid votes		73,464	100.00	
Total rejected ballots		1,432		
Unreturned ballots		119		
Turnout		75,015	89.31	▲9.62
Registered electors		83,991		
Majority		13,450	18.30	▼4.16
DAP gain from BN		Swing		?
Source(s) "Federal Government Gazette - Notice of Contested Election, Parliament for the State of Johore [P.U. (B) 181/2013]" (PDF). Attorney General's Chambers of Malaysia. 26 April 2013. "Federal Government Gazette - Results of Contested Election and Statements of the Poll after the Official Addition of Votes, Parliamentary Constituencies for the State of Johore [P.U. (B) 222/2013]" (PDF). Attorney General's Chambers of Malaysia. 22 May 2013.

Malaysian general election, 2008
Party	Candidate	Votes	%	∆%
BN	Ong Ka Ting	32,017	61.23	▼8.32
DAP	Ng Pack Siong	20,273	38.77	▲8.32
Total valid votes		52,290	100.00	
Total rejected ballots		1,327		
Unreturned ballots		59		
Turnout		53,676	79.69	▲2.00
Registered electors		67,358		
Majority		11,744	22.46	▼16.64
BN hold		Swing		

Malaysian general election, 2004
Party	Candidate	Votes	%
BN	Lim Si Cheng	32,278	69.55
DAP	Ong Kow Meng	14,134	30.45
Total valid votes		46,412	100.00
Total rejected ballots		1,935	
Unreturned ballots		30	
Turnout		48,377	77.69
Registered electors		62,273	
Majority		18,144	39.10
This was a new constituency created.
