= Senai (federal constituency) =

Johor constituency

Defunct federal constituency
- Legislature: Dewan Rakyat
- Constituency created: 1984
- Constituency abolished: 2004
- First contested: 1986
- Last contested: 1999

Senai was a federal constituency in Johor, Malaysia, that was represented in the Dewan Rakyat from 1986 to 2004.

The federal constituency was created in the 1984 redistribution and was mandated to return a single member to the Dewan Rakyat under the first past the post voting system.

== History ==
It was abolished in 2004 when it was redistributed.

=== Representation history ===
Members of Parliament for Senai
Parliament	No	Years	Member	Party	Vote Share
Constituency created from Renggam and Panti
7th	P127	1986-1990	Woon See Chin (云时进)	BN (MCA)	25,826; 61.35%
8th	P127	1990-1995	Woon See Chin (云时进)	BN (MCA)	27,697; 56.73%
9th	P138	1995-1999	Lim Si Cheng (林时清)	BN (MCA)	32,170; 71.98%
10th	P138	1999-2004	Lim Si Cheng (林时清)	BN (MCA)	32,237; 68.68%
Constituency abolished, split into Kulai and Tenggara

=== State constituency ===
Parliamentary constituency	State constituency						
Parliamentary constituency	1954–59*	1959–1974	1974–1986	1986–1995	1995–2004	2004–2018	2018–present
Senai				Bandar Tenggara			
Senai					Bukit Permai		
Senai				Kulai			

=== Historical boundaries ===
State Constituency	Area	
State Constituency	1984	1994
Bandar Tenggara	Ayer Bemban; Bandar Tenggara; Bukit Batu; FELDA Taib Andak; Kelapa Sawit	
Bukit Permai		Bandar Putera Kulai; FELDA Bukit Permai; Seelong; Senai; Sengkang
Kulai	Bandar Putra Kulai; Indahpura; Saleng; Senai; Skudai	Ayer Bemban; Bukit Batu; Indahpura; Kelapa Sawit; Saleng

== Election results ==
Malaysian general election, 1999
Party	Candidate	Votes	%	∆%
BN	Lim Si Cheng	32,237	68.68	▼3.30
DAP	Tan Hang Meng	14,704	31.32	▲3.30
Total valid votes		46,941	100.00	
Total rejected ballots		1,591		
Unreturned ballots		24		
Turnout		48,556	74.98	▼1.52
Registered electors		64,753		
Majority		17,533	37.36	▼6.60
BN hold		Swing		

Malaysian general election, 1995
Party	Candidate	Votes	%	∆%
BN	Lim Si Cheng	32,170	71.98	▲15.25
DAP	M. Salleh Ahmad	12,522	28.02	▼11.61
Total valid votes		44,692	100.00	
Total rejected ballots		1,730		
Unreturned ballots		6		
Turnout		46,428	76.50	▼0.51
Registered electors		60,688		
Majority		19,648	43.96	▲26.86
BN hold		Swing		

Malaysian general election, 1990
Party	Candidate	Votes	%	∆%
BN	Woon See Chin	27,697	56.73	▼4.62
DAP	Liew Kon Chin	19,349	39.63	▲0.98
Independent	Ibrahim Hanafia	1,777	3.64	▲3.64
Total valid votes		48,823	100.00	
Total rejected ballots		1,775		
Unreturned ballots		0		
Turnout		50,598	77.01	▲0.71
Registered electors		65,703		
Majority		8,348	17.10	▼5.60
BN hold		Swing		

Malaysian general election, 1986
Party	Candidate	Votes	%
BN	Woon See Chin	25,826	61.35
DAP	Yap Ah Ngau	16,267	38.65
Total valid votes		42,093	100.00
Total rejected ballots		1,834	
Unreturned ballots		0	
Turnout		43,927	76.30
Registered electors		57,568	
Majority		9,559	22.70
This was a new constituency created.
