= Nik Ahmad Kamil =

Malaysian politician

Yang Berbahagia Dato' Sri Setia Raja Tan Sri Dato' Nik Ahmad Kamil Nik Mahmud DK (Kelantan) PMN SPMK SJMK PYGP
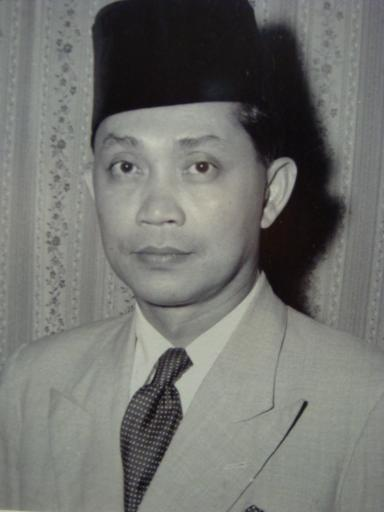

4th Speaker of the Dewan Rakyat
- In office 11 November 1974 – 20 December 1977
- Monarchs: Abdul Halim; Yahya Petra
- Preceded by: Chik Mohamad Yusuf Sheikh Abdul Rahman
- Succeeded by: Syed Nasir Syed Ismail

3rd High Commissioner of Malaya to the United Kingdom
- In office 1957–1958
- Preceded by: Othman Mohamad
- Succeeded by: Tunku Ya'acob Sultan Abdul Hamid Halim Shah

1st High Commissioner of Malaya to Australia
- In office 1956–1957
- Preceded by: Position established
- Succeeded by: Gunn Lay Teik

11th Menteri Besar of Kelantan
- In office 1944–1953
- Preceded by: Nik Mahmud Nik Ismail
- Succeeded by: Tengku Muhammad Hamzah Tengku Zainal Abidin

Personal details
- Born: Nik Ahmad Kamil bin Nik Mahmud; 7 July 1909 Kota Bharu, Kelantan, Unfederated Malay States, British Malaya (now Malaysia)
- Died: 20 December 1977 (aged 68) Petaling Jaya, Selangor, Malaysia
- Resting place: Kampung Tunku Muslim Cemetery, Petaling Jaya, Selangor
- Party: United Malays National Organisation (UMNO)
- Other political affiliations: Barisan Nasional (BN)
- Spouse: Nafisah Mahmood
- Education: University of Bristol; Lincoln's Inn
- Profession: Lawyer, Politician

Nik Ahmad Kamil bin Nik Mahmud (7 July 1909 – 20 December 1977) was a Malaysian politician who played an active role during the country's road to independence. A prominent member of the United Malays National Organisation (UMNO) in the state of Kelantan, he served as the fourth Speaker of the Dewan Rakyat, the lower house of the Malaysian Parliament.

Nik Ahmad Kamil was a lawyer and member of the Bar. His daughter, Nik Mariah was also a lawyer and member of the Bar.

== Early life and career ==
Nik Ahmad Kamil was born in Kota Bharu in 1909. His father, Nik Mahmud Nik Ismail was the Menteri Besar of Kelantan. He was educated at Madrasah Muhammadiah, Kota Bharu and Malay College Kuala Kangsar. After studying Arts at the University of Bristol, he obtained his Bachelor of Laws from Lincoln's Inn in 1930. He was called to the Bar that year.

He joined the Kelantan civil service under the British colonial administration in 1930 and served as State Secretary from 1934 to 1938, succeeding his uncle. In 1938, he was appointed Deputy Menteri Besar under his father. He succeeded his father as Menteri Besar in 1942 and held the post throughout the Japanese occupation.

== Political career ==
From 1946 to 1948, during the Malayan Union period, Nik Ahmad Kamil served as Deputy Resident Commissioner in Kelantan under the new system of government. However, he became a staunch opponent of the Malayan Union and led the Persatuan Melayu Kelantan (Kelantan Malay Association, PKM) in protesting the new system, which he felt infringed upon the rights of the Malays and their rulers. He represented PKM at the first Pan-Malayan Malay Congress in Johor Bahru in 1946 which saw the founding of the United Malays National Organisation (UMNO). He was an active member of UMNO, serving on its executive committee. When the Malayan Union was finally dissolved in 1948, Nik Ahmad Kamil continued as Menteri Besar of Kelantan under the new Federation of Malaya until 1953.

=== Parti Negara ===
Nik Ahmad Kamil was a close supporter of UMNO founder Onn Jaafar. He was selected by Onn to join a working committee in charge of drafting a charter for the newly formed UMNO. He followed Onn's exit from UMNO in 1951 and joined the Independence of Malaya Party and Parti Negara, two parties formed by Onn in opposition to UMNO and the Alliance Party. He was chosen to serve under the Member System from 1953 to 1956, and held the Lands, Mines and Communications portfolio and later the Local Government, Housing and Town Development portfolio.

=== Back in UMNO ===
In the first ever federal elections in 1955, Nik Ahmad Kamil contested a seat as a Parti Negara candidate. He lost, and Parti Negara was swept aside by the Alliance Party led by Tunku Abdul Rahman. Realizing that Parti Negara had failed to gain relevance among the people of Malaya, he left to rejoin UMNO. He served under the new Alliance government as Commissioner of Trade to Australia from 1956 to 1957.

=== Diplomacy ===
Nik Ahmad Kamil joined the 1956 Merdeka Delegation led by the Tunku to London as one of four representatives of the Malay rulers. Following the independence of Malaya on 31 August 1957, he was appointed the first High Commissioner to the United Kingdom and served until 1958. He remained in the diplomatic circles and served as both Permanent Representative to the United Nations as well as Ambassador to the United States from 1959 to 1962.

=== Return to active politics ===
Nik Ahmad Kamil returned to contest the 1964 general election and won the Kota Bharu Hilir parliamentary seat in Kelantan. However, UMNO still lost out to the Pan-Malaysian Islamic Party (PAS) in Kelantan. In the next election in 1969, he won the Ulu Kelantan seat as PAS retained control of the state.

He served as a member of the UMNO supreme council and later became its permanent chairman. In 1971, he was elected Deputy Speaker of the Dewan Rakyat. In 1974, he succeeded C.M. Yusuf as Speaker of the Dewan Rakyat, a position he held until his death.

== Death ==
Nik Ahmad Kamil suffered a heart attack while carrying out his duties in the Parliament building on 19 December 1977. He died the following morning.

== Honours ==
=== Honours of Malaysia ===
- Malaya
  - Commander of the Order of the Defender of the Realm (PMN) – Tan Sri (1958)
- Malaysia
  - Recipient of the Malaysian Commemorative Medal (Gold) (PPM) (1965)
- Kelantan
  - Recipient of the Royal Family Order or Star of Yunus (DK)
  - Order for Dato' Titleholders – Dato' Sri Setia Raja (1935)
  - Knight Grand Commander of the Order of the Crown of Kelantan or Al-Muhammadi Star (SPMK) - Dato' (1933)
  - Knight Grand Commander of the Order of the Life of the Crown of Kelantan or Al-Ismaili Star (SJMK) - Dato'
  - Recipient of the Order of the Most Distinguished and Most Valiant Warrior (PYGP)

=== Foreign honours ===
- United Kingdom
  - Honorary Commander of the Order of the British Empire (CBE, 1948)
  - Recipient of the King George V Silver Jubilee Medal (1935)
  - Recipient of the King George VI Coronation Medal (1937)

Political offices
Preceded by Chik Mohamad Yusuf	Speaker of the Dewan Rakyat; 1974–1977	Succeeded by Syed Nasir Ismail
Preceded by Nik Mahmud Ismail	Menteri Besar of Kelantan; 1944–1953	Succeeded by Tengku Hamzah Zainal Abidin
