= Syed Nasir Ismail =

Malaysian politician

Yang Amat Berbahagia Tun Syed Nasir Ismail SSM PMN SPMJ SSIJ SIMP DPMP JMN PIS BSI
- سيد ناصر إسماعيل

5th Speaker of the Dewan Rakyat
- In office 9 January 1978 – 16 March 1982
- Monarchs: Yahya Petra; Ahmad Shah
- Preceded by: Nik Ahmad Kamil Nik Mahmud
- Succeeded by: Mohamed Zahir Ismail

Member of the Malaysian Parliament for Pagoh
- In office 1974–1978
- Preceded by: Constituency established
- Succeeded by: Muhyiddin Yassin

Member of the Malaysian Parliament for Muar Dalam
- In office 1971–1974
- Preceded by: Aziz Ishak
- Succeeded by: Constituency abolished

2nd Director of Dewan Bahasa dan Pustaka
- In office 1957–1969
- Preceded by: Ungku Abdul Aziz
- Succeeded by: Ali Ahmad

Personal details
- Born: 7 March 1921 Batu Pahat, Johor, Unfederated Malay States, British Malaya (now Malaysia)
- Died: 16 March 1982 (aged 61) Kuala Lumpur, Malaysia
- Resting place: Makam Pahlawan, Masjid Negara, Kuala Lumpur
- Party: United Malays National Organisation (UMNO)
- Spouse: Sharifah Aishah Syed Mohamad
- Children: 10

Tun Syed Nasir bin Syed Ismail (Arabic: سيد ناصر بن سيد إسماعيل Sayyid Nāṣir bin ʼIsmāʻīl; 7 March 1921– 16 March 1982) was a Speaker of the Dewan Rakyat, the lower house of the Parliament of Malaysia. During his lifetime, he was known as a nationalist who sought to fight for the primacy of the national language in Malaysia as a means to create a national identity through the closing down of public-funded Mandarin and Tamil vernacular schools. Tun Syed Nasir sees a common education system for all as a solution to this dilemma. A prominent politician from the United Malays National Organisation (UMNO) – the leading party of the governing Barisan Nasional coalition – he served as the 5th Speaker of the Dewan Rakyat from 1978 till his death in 1982.

He was born in Batu Pahat, Johor, Malaysia, and is of Hadhrami Arab descent.

== Awards and recognitions ==
=== Honours of Malaysia ===
- Malaya
  - Companion of the Order of the Defender of the Realm (JMN) (1961)
- Malaysia
  - Recipient of the Malaysian Commemorative Medal (Silver) (PPM) (1965)
  - Commander of the Order of the Defender of the Realm (PMN) – Tan Sri (1971)
  - Grand Commander of the Order of Loyalty to the Crown of Malaysia (SSM) – Tun (1982)
- Johor
  - Recipient of the Star of Sultan Ismail (BSI)
  - Recipient of the Sultan Ibrahim Medal (PIS)
  - Knight Grand Companion of the Order of Loyalty of Sultan Ismail of Johor (SSIJ) – Dato'
  - Knight Grand Commander of the Order of the Crown of Johor (SPMJ) – Dato'
- Pahang
  - Grand Knight of the Order of the Crown of Pahang (SIMP) – formerly Dato', now Dato' Indera (1980)
- Perlis
  - Knight Commander of the Order of the Crown of Perlis (DPMP) – Dato'

=== Places named after him ===
Several places were named after him, including:

- Kolej Tun Syed Nasir, a residential college at Universiti Kebangsaan Malaysia, Bangi, Selangor
- Kolej Tun Syed Nasir, a residential college at Universiti Tun Hussein Onn Malaysia, Batu Pahat, Johor
- Politeknik Tun Syed Nasir Syed Ismail in Muar, Johor
- Taman Tun Syed Nasir, a residential area in Muar, Johor
- Kampung Kenangan Tun Syed Nasir in Muar, Johor
- Sekolah Menengah Kebangsaan Tun Syed Nasir Ismail, Johor Bahru (SMKTSNI)

Political offices
Preceded by Nik Ahmad Kamil Nik Mahmud	Speaker of the Dewan Rakyat; 1978–1982	Succeeded by Mohamed Zahir Ismail
