= Syed Esa Alwee =

Malaysian politician

Yang Berhormat (Note: The prefix "Yang Berhormat" is used for recipients of the First and Second Classes of the Johor's Orders of Chivalry.) Dato' Syed Esa Alwee DPMJ JMN PLP PIS JP
- سيد عيسى علوي

2nd Speaker of the Dewan Rakyat
- In office 18 May 1964 – 24 November 1964
- Monarch: Syed Putra Jamalullail
- Prime Minister: Tunku Abdul Rahman
- Preceded by: Mohamed Noah Omar
- Succeeded by: Chik Mohamad Yusof Sheikh Abdul Rahman

Personal details
- Party: UMNO – BN

Dato' Syed Esa bin Alwee was a Malaysian politician. He was a prominent Malay leader during the British colonial period and the subsequent struggle for independence. He became the second Speaker of the Dewan Rakyat, the lower house of the Malaysian Parliament in 1964.

Syed Esa was also a Scout, and was Chief Commissioner of Scouts, the administrative head of the Malaysian Scouting Association, from 1963 to 1968.

== Biography ==
He received his secondary education at English College Johore Bahru. Syed Esa was vice-president of the Peninsular Malay Movement, Johor branch (PMSJ) which organised a historic rally against the Malayan Union in Batu Pahat on 12 February 1946. After independence, he served as Member of Parliament for Batu Pahat Dalam, and was elected Speaker of the Dewan Rakyat in May 1964. He stepped down from the role in November that year, and became Deputy Speaker until 1969.

Political offices
| Preceded by Mohamad Noah Omar | Speaker of the Dewan Rakyat; 1964 | Succeeded by Chik Mohamad Yusuf |
