= Muhammad Abdullah (Malaysian politician) =

Malaysian politician

Yang Berbahagia Datuk Muhammad Abdullah PJN DIMP
- محمد بن عبدﷲ

Ministerial roles
- 1995–1999: Parliamentary Secretary in the Prime Minister's Department

Faction represented in Dewan Rakyat
- 1986–2004: Barisan Nasional

Other roles
- 1999–2004: Deputy Speaker of the Dewan Rakyat

Personal details
- Born: 1942 (age 83–84) Pahang
- Citizenship: Malaysian
- Party: United Malays National Organisation (UMNO)
- Other political affiliations: Barisan Nasional (BN)
- Occupation: Politician

Muhammad bin Abdullah (Jawi: محمد بن عبدﷲ; born 1942) is a Malaysian politician of the United Malays National Organisation (UMNO), member of the Barisan National (BN). He was served as Deputy Speaker of the Dewan Rakyat from 1999 to 2004.

== Election results ==
Parliament of Malaysia
Year	Constituency	Candidate	Votes	Pct	Opponent(s)	Votes	Pct	Ballots cast	Majority	Turnout
1986	P077 Maran	Muhammad Abdullah (UMNO)	20,658	73.05%	Alwi Abd Hamid (PAS)	7,623	26.95%	29,018	13,035	76.10%
1990	P077 Maran	Muhammad Abdullah (UMNO)	24,639	69.10%	Syed Noh Syed Mohamad (PAS)	11,019	30.90%	36,557	13,620	79.79%
1995	P081 Maran	Muhammad Abdullah (UMNO)	22,372	72.88%	Mohamed Rusdi Arif (PAS)	8,326	27.12%	31,816	14,046	76.84%
1999	P081 Maran	Muhammad Abdullah (UMNO)	18,259	55.72%	Tengku Puji Tengku Abdul Hamid (PAS)	14,511	44.28%	33,483	3,748	77.88%

== Honours ==
=== Honours of Malaysia ===
- Malaysia
  - Commander of the Order of Meritorious Service (PJN) – Datuk (2003)
- Pahang
  - Knight Companion of the Order of the Crown of Pahang (DIMP) – Dato' (1991)
