= Ong Ka Ting =

Malaysian politician

Yang Berbahagia Tan Sri Dato' Seri Ong Ka Ting PMN SPMP DPMP DPMS
- 黄家定

Acting Minister of Health
- In office 2 January 2008 – 18 March 2008
- Monarch: Tuanku Syed Sirajuddin
- Prime Minister: Abdullah Ahmad Badawi
- Deputy: Abdul Latiff Ahmad
- Preceded by: Chua Soi Lek
- Constituency: Kulai

Minister of Housing and Local Government
- In office 15 December 1999 – 18 March 2008
- Monarchs: Sultan Salahuddin Abdul Aziz Shah; Tuanku Syed Sirajuddin
- Prime Minister: Mahathir Mohamad; Abdullah Ahmad Badawi
- Deputy: Peter Chin Fah Kui (Deputy Minister of Housing and Local Government I) (1999–2004); M. Kayveas (Deputy Minister of Housing and Local Government II) (2001–2003)
- Preceded by: Ting Chew Peh
- Constituency: Pontian

Deputy Minister of Home Affairs II
- In office 8 May 1995 – 14 December 1999 Serving with Megat Junid Megat Ayub (1995–1997); Azmi Khalid (1997–1999)
- Monarchs: Tuanku Ja'afar; Sultan Salahuddin Abdul Aziz Shah
- Prime Minister: Mahathir Mohamad
- Minister: Mahathir Mohamad; Abdullah Ahmad Badawi
- Constituency: Pontian

Parliamentary Secretary of the Ministry of Home Affairs
- In office 1993–1995
- Monarchs: Sultan Azlan Shah; Tuanku Ja'afar
- Prime Minister: Mahathir Mohamad
- Minister: Mahathir Mohamad
- Deputy Minister: Megat Junid Megat Ayub

Parliamentary Secretary of the Ministry of Health
- In office 1990–1993
- Monarchs: Sultan Azlan Shah; Tuanku Ja'afar
- Prime Minister: Mahathir Mohamad
- Minister: Lee Kim Sai
- Deputy Minister: Mohd Farid Ariffin

7th President of the Malaysian Chinese Association
- In office 23 May 2003 – 18 October 2008
- Deputy: Chan Kong Choy
- Preceded by: Ling Liong Sik
- Succeeded by: Ong Tee Keat

Faction represented in Dewan Rakyat
- 1990–2013: Barisan Nasional

Other roles
- 2011–2017: Special Envoy of Malaysia to China

Personal details
- Born: 15 November 1956 (age 69) Lenggong, Perak, Federation of Malaya (now Malaysia)
- Party: Malaysian Chinese Association (MCA)
- Other political affiliations: Barisan Nasional (BN); Perikatan Nasional (PN)
- Spouse: Wendy Chong Siew Mei (张秀梅)
- Relations: Younger brother of Ong Ka Chuan
- Children: Ong Li En; Ong Xing Yang
- Education: University of Malaya (UM)
- Occupation: Politician

Ong Ka Ting (simplified Chinese: 黄家定; traditional Chinese: 黃家定; pinyin: Huáng Jiādìng; Pe̍h-ōe-jī: N̂g Ka-tēng; born 15 November 1956) is a Malaysian politician. He was the former Housing and Local Government Minister from 1999 to 2008 and Acting Transport Minister from May to June 2003 in the Malaysian cabinet. Ong also served as the seventh president of the Malaysian Chinese Association (MCA), a major component party in Barisan Nasional (BN); from May 2003 to October 2008. He was appointed Special Envoy of Malaysia to China on 1 November 2011. He relinquished the Special Envoy's post on 31 December 2017 after serving three terms.

== Early life ==
Ong was born on 15 November 1956 in Lenggong, Perak. He graduated from University of Malaya, majoring in Mathematics and Science in 1980. He began his career as a chemistry teacher in Catholic High School in Petaling Jaya from 1981 until 1986.

MCA former secretary-general for twice, Ong Ka Chuan, is his elder brother.

He is married to Puan Sri Wendy Chong Siew Mei. The couple have two children – Chloe Ong Li En and Ong Xing Yang.

== Political career ==
From 1986 until 1990, Ong was the political secretary to Ling Liong Sik, the MCA president and Minister of Transport then. After winning the 1990 general elections to be Member of Parliament (MP) of Pontian, he was appointed Parliamentary Secretary to the Ministry of Health from 26 October 1990 until 24 February 1991 by Prime Minister Mahathir Mohamad. Ong was next appointed Parliamentary Secretary to the Ministry of Home Affairs from 25 February 1991 through April 1995, before being promoted to be the Deputy Minister of the same Ministry on 3 May 1993.

In 1999, he was promoted to become a full-fledged minister leading the Ministry of Housing and Local Government, a position he held until 2008. In a 2003 leadership transition plan which saw Ong and Chan Kong Choy were elected to succeed retiring Ling and Lim Ah Lek as party President and Deputy President respectively. In 2004, he retained his parliamentary seat of Tanjung Piai with a 23,615 votes majority over the opposition candidate. In January 2008, he was appointed as Acting Health Minister following the resignation of Dr. Chua Soi Lek who was involved in a sex scandal.

In the 2008 general election, Ong succeeded in his bid for the Kulai Parliamentary seat. However, the election was marked by heavy losses for the ruling BN coalition, especially among candidates from the MCA and Malaysian Indian Congress (MIC). In the subsequent Cabinet reshuffle, Ong was not retained as a member of the Cabinet by his request, as he wanted to focus his energies in restructuring and re-engineering the MCA to win back Chinese voters' support. His former Cabinet portfolio was handed over to his elder brother, Ong Ka Chuan who was MCA Secretary-General, Perak MCA chief and MP of Tanjung Malim in Perak.

In 2008, he had left the presidency of MCA and had passed the highest post of the party to Ong Tee Keat after the successful party election on 18 October 2008. After leaving the post for one and a half years, on 17 March 2010 Ong Ka Ting announced his intention to contest for the party's presidency in the 28 March party elections. He contested the presidency against incumbent Ong Tee Keat and reinstated deputy president Dr. Chua Soi Lek in a three-corner fight. However he failed in the comeback attempt and was defeated by Dr. Chua.

In 2013, Ong decided not to recontest his parliamentary seat in the 2013 general election thus retire as a six-term MP.

== Election results ==
Parliament of Malaysia
Year	Constituency	Candidate	Votes	Pct	Opponent(s)	Votes	Pct	Ballots cast	Majority	Turnout
1990	P133 Pontian	Ong Ka Ting (MCA)	24,362	61.93%	Gan Peck Cheng (DAP)	14,978	38.07%	41,637	9,384	75.06%
1995	P144 Pontian	Ong Ka Ting (MCA)	37,230	88.00%	Saleh @ Daud Hassan (S46)	5,079	12.00%	44,772	32,151	74.07%
1999	P144 Pontian	Ong Ka Ting (MCA)	38,169	82.21%	Diong Chi Tzuoh (keADILan)	8,259	17.79%	48,055	29,910	74.43%
2004	P165 Tanjong Piai	Ong Ka Ting (MCA)	28,046	86.36%	Tan Hang Meng (DAP)	4,431	13.64%	33,938	23,615	76.14%
2008	P163 Kulai	Ong Ka Ting (MCA)	32,017	61.23%	Ng Pack Siong (DAP)	20,273	38.77%	53,676	11,744	79.69%

== Honours ==
=== Honours of Malaysia ===
- Malaysia
  - Commander of the Order of the Defender of the Realm (PMN) – Tan Sri (2009)
- Perak
  - Knight Grand Commander of the Order of the Perak State Crown (SPMP) – Dato' Seri (2000)
  - Knight Commander of the Order of the Perak State Crown (DPMP) – Dato' (1997)
- Selangor
  - Knight Commander of the Order of the Crown of Selangor (DPMS) – Dato' (2005)

Political offices
Preceded by Ling Liong Sik	Malaysian Chinese Association (MCA) President; 23 May 2003 – 18 October 2008	Succeeded by Ong Tee Keat
