= Zakaria Hanafi =

Malaysian politician

- زكريا بن حنفي

Member of the Selangor State Legislative Assembly for Semenyih
- In office 18 March 2019 – 12 August 2023
- Preceded by: Bakhtiar Mohd Nor (PH–BERSATU)
- Succeeded by: Nushi Mahfodz (PN–PAS)
- Majority: 1,914 (2019)

Faction represented in Selangor State Legislative Assembly
- 2019–2023: Barisan Nasional

Personal details
- Born: Zakaria bin Hanafi; 4 March 1961 (age 65) Beranang, Selangor, Federation of Malaya (now Malaysia)
- Party: United Malays National Organisation (UMNO)
- Other political affiliations: Barisan Nasional (BN)
- Education: National University of Malaysia
- Occupation: Politician

Yang Berhormat Tuan Zakaria bin Haji Hanafi (born 4 March 1961) is a Malaysian politician who served as Member of the Selangor State Legislative Assembly (MLA) for Semenyih from March 2019 to August 2023. He is a member of the United Malays National Organisation (UMNO), a component party of the Barisan Nasional (BN) coalition.

== Election results ==
Selangor State Legislative Assembly
Year	Constituency	Candidate	Votes	Pct	Opponent(s)	Votes	Pct	Ballots cast	Majority	Turnout
2019	N24 Semenyih	Zakaria Hanafi (UMNO)	19,780	50.44%	Muhammad Aiman Zainali (BERSATU)	17,866	45.56%	39,218	1,914	73.3%
2019	N24 Semenyih	Zakaria Hanafi (UMNO)	19,780	50.44%	Nik Aziz Afiq Abdul (PSM)	847	2.16%	39,218	1,914	73.3%
2019	N24 Semenyih	Zakaria Hanafi (UMNO)	19,780	50.44%	Kuan Chee Heng (IND)	725	1.84%	39,218	1,914	73.3%
