= Ahmad Bhari Abd Rahman =

Malaysian politician

Yang Berbahagia Dato' Ahmad Bhari Abd Rahman DSSA PPT JP
- احمد بهاري عبد رحمن

Member of the Selangor State Legislative Assembly for Taman Templer
- In office 21 March 2004 – 8 March 2008
- Preceded by: constituency renamed from Selayang Baharu
- Succeeded by: Subahan Kamal (BN–UMNO)
- Majority: 7,625 (2004)

Member of the Selangor State Legislative Assembly for Selayang Baharu
- In office 25 April 1995 – 21 March 2004
- Preceded by: constituency created from Rawang
- Succeeded by: constituency renamed from Taman Templer
- Majority: 13,140 (1995); 2,845 (1999)

Member of the Selangor State Legislative Assembly for Gombak Setia
- In office 21 October 1990 – 25 April 1995
- Preceded by: Kaharudin Momin (BN–UMNO)
- Succeeded by: Rakibah Abdul Manap (BN–UMNO)
- Majority: 10,664 (1990)

Personal details
- Party: United Malays National Organisation (UMNO)
- Other political affiliations: Barisan Nasional (BN)

Ahmad Bhari Abd Rahman is a Malaysian politician who served as Member of the Selangor State Legislative Assembly (MLA) for Taman Templer from March 2004 to March 2008, Selayang Baharu from April 1995 to March 2004 and Gombak Setia from October 1990 to April 1995. He is a member of United Malays National Organisation (UMNO), a component party of Barisan Nasional (BN).

Ahmad Bhari had served as Chairman of the Gombak Petaling Area Farmers Organization from 2016 to 2019 and Members of the Board of the Farmers Organization term 2021 to 2024.

== Election results ==
Selangor State Legislative Assembly
Year	Constituency	Candidate	Votes	Pct	Opponent(s)	Votes	Pct	Ballots cast	Majority	Turnout
1990	N17 Gombak Setia	Ahmad Bhari Abd Rahman (UMNO)	15,323	76.68%	Baharin Othman (PAS)	4,659	23.32%	20,528	10,664	72.16%
1995	N14 Selayang Baharu	Ahmad Bhari Abd Rahman (UMNO)	16,049	84.66%	Hasbolah Mohd Arif (PAS)	2,909	15.34%	19,496	13,140	69.54%
1999	N14 Selayang Baharu	Ahmad Bhari Abd Rahman (UMNO)	12,629	56.35%	Idrus Wan Chik (keADILan)	9,784	43.65%	22,927	2,845	74.64%
2004	N15 Taman Templer	Ahmad Bhari Abd Rahman (UMNO)	16,536	64.98%	Mohd Hatta Ramli (PAS)	8,911	35.02%	26,416	7,625	74.56%

== Honours ==
- Selangor
  - Knight Companion of the Order of Sultan Salahuddin Abdul Aziz Shah (DSSA) – Dato' (1996)
  - Recipient of the Distinguished Conduct Medal (PPT) (1987)
  - Justice of the Peace (JP) (1994)
