= Hulu Langat (federal constituency) =

Federal constituency of Selangor, Malaysia

Hulu Langat (P101)
Selangor constituency

Federal constituency
- Legislature: Dewan Rakyat
- MP: Mohd Sany Hamzan; PH
- Constituency created: 1974
- First contested: 1974
- Last contested: 2022

Demographics
- Population (2020): 347,569
- Electors (2023): 171,719
- Area (km²): 620
- Pop. density (per km²): 560.6

Hulu Langat (formerly Ulu Langat) is a federal constituency in Hulu Langat District, Selangor, Malaysia, that has been represented in the Dewan Rakyat since 1974.

The federal constituency was created from parts of the Langat constituency in the 1974 redistribution and is mandated to return a single member to the Dewan Rakyat under the first past the post voting system.

== Demographics ==
Ethnic breakdown of Hulu Langat's electorate as of 2022
1. Malay 69.36 (68.3%)
2. Chinese 20.3 (20.0%)
3. Indian 9.28 (9.14%)
4. Other ethnicities 2.55 (2.51%)
Age breakdown of Hulu Langat's electorate as of 2022
1. 18-20 (8.92%)
2. 21-29 (26.0%)
3. 30-39 (21.4%)
4. 40-49 (16.2%)
5. 50-59 (13.7%)
6. 60-69 (9.23%)
7. 70-79 (3.45%)
8. 80-89 (0.98%)
9. above 90 (0.16%)
Gender breakdown of Hulu Langat's electorate as of 2022
1. Male (50.0%)
2. Female (50.0%)

== History ==
=== Polling districts ===
According to the gazette issued on 18 July 2023, the Hulu Langat constituency has a total of 41 polling districts.

State constituency	Polling districts	Code	Location
Dusun Tua (N23)	Pangsun	101/23/01	SK Lubuk Kelubi
Dusun Tua (N23)	Lui	101/23/02	SK Sungai Lui
Dusun Tua (N23)	Kampung Jawa	101/23/03	SRA Batu 18 Hulu Langat
Dusun Tua (N23)	Pekan Lui	101/23/04	SJK (C) Choon Hwa Batu 18 Hulu Langat
Dusun Tua (N23)	Sungai Tekali	101/23/05	SK Sungai Tekali
Dusun Tua (N23)	Dusun Tua	101/23/06	SK Dusun Tua
Dusun Tua (N23)	Batu 14 Hulu Langat	101/23/07	SMK Abdul Jalil Hulu Langat
Dusun Tua (N23)	Sungai Serai	101/23/08	SK Sungai Serai
Dusun Tua (N23)	Batu 9 Cheras	101/23/09	SJK (C) Batu 9 Cheras
Dusun Tua (N23)	Kampung Sungai Raya	101/23/10	SRA Batu 9 Cheras
Dusun Tua (N23)	Taman Suntex	101/23/11	SK Batu Sembilan Cheras
Dusun Tua (N23)	Taman Cuepacs	101/23/12	SK Taman Cuepacs
Dusun Tua (N23)	Batu 13 Hulu Langat	101/23/13	SRA Pekan Hulu Langat
Dusun Tua (N23)	Sri Nanding	101/23/14	SRA Dusun Nanding Hulu Langat
Dusun Tua (N23)	Kampung Melaka	101/23/15	SK Bukit Raya
Dusun Tua (N23)	Taman Alam Jaya	101/23/16	SK Taman Puteri Cheras
Dusun Tua (N23)	Taman Kota Cheras	101/23/17	SRA Batu 10 Cheras
Dusun Tua (N23)	Batu 10 Cheras	101/23/18	Kompleks Penghulu Mukim Cheras
Semenyih (N24)	Semenyih Barat	101/24/01	SK Bandar Sunway Semenyih
Semenyih (N24)	Hulu Semenyih	101/24/02	SK Ulu Semenyih
Semenyih (N24)	Tarun	101/24/03	Pejabat Jawatankuasa Kemajuan Dan Keselamatan Kampung (JKKK) Kampung Baru Tarun / Broga
Semenyih (N24)	Kampung Tanjong	101/24/04	SK Semenyih
Semenyih (N24)	Kampung Baharu Semenyih	101/24/05	SJK (C) Kampung Baru Semenyih
Semenyih (N24)	Pekan Semenyih	101/24/06	SJK (C) Sin Ming Semenyih
Semenyih (N24)	Semenyih Selatan	101/24/07	SRA Batu Tiga Jalan Bangi
Semenyih (N24)	Kampung Rinching	101/24/08	SK Kampung Rinching
Semenyih (N24)	Bandar Rinching Seksyen 1–4	101/24/09	SK Bandar Rinching
Semenyih (N24)	Sesapan Kelubi	101/24/10	Pejabat Jawatankuasa Kemajuan Dan Keselamatan Kampung (JKKK), Kampung Sesapan Kelubi
Semenyih (N24)	Sesapan Batu	101/24/11	SRA Sesapan Batu Minangkabau
Semenyih (N24)	Sungai Jai	101/24/12	Balai Raya Kampung Sungai Jai
Semenyih (N24)	Beranang	101/24/13	SK Beranang
Semenyih (N24)	Kuala Pajam	101/24/14	SK Kampung Kuala Pajam
Semenyih (N24)	Sungai Kembung	101/24/15	SK Rinching Hilir
Semenyih (N24)	Sesapan Batu Rembau	101/24/16	Balai Raya Sesapan Batu Rembau
Semenyih (N24)	Kampung Batu 26 Beranang	101/24/17	Balai Raya Taman PKNS Batu 26 Beranang
Semenyih (N24)	Penjara Kajang	101/24/18	Kafa Integrasi Hidayatul Iman
Semenyih (N24)	Semenyih Indah	101/24/19	SMK Engku Hussain
Semenyih (N24)	Bandar Rinching Seksyen 5–6	101/24/20	SMK Bandar Rinching
Semenyih (N24)	Bandar Tasik Kesuma	101/24/21	SMK Bandar Tasik Kesuma
Semenyih (N24)	Kantan Permai	101/24/22	SK Kantan Permai; SRA Sungai Kantan 3
Semenyih (N24)	Bukit Mahkota	101/24/23	SMK Bandar Seri Putra; SK Bandar Bukit Mahkota

=== Representation history ===
Members of Parliament for Hulu Langat
Parliament	No	Years	Member	Party	Vote Share
Constituency created, renamed from Langat
Ulu Langat
4th	P078	1974–1978	Lee Siok Yew (李孝友)	BN (MCA)	14,651; 72.94%
5th	P078	1978–1982	Rosemary Chow Poh Kheng (周宝琼)	BN (MCA)	12,539; 44.85%
6th	P078	1982–1986	Rosemary Chow Poh Kheng (周宝琼)	BN (MCA)	18,152; 61.35%
Hulu Langat
7th	P089	1986–1990	Lee Kim Sai (李金狮)	BN (MCA)	22,217; 57.38%
8th	P089	1990–1995	Lee Kim Sai (李金狮)	BN (MCA)	28,714; 60.84%
9th	P093	1995–1999	Badrul Hisham Abdul Aziz (بدرول هشام عبدالعزيز)	BN (UMNO)	38,172; 83.84%
10th	P093	1999–2004	Badrul Hisham Abdul Aziz (بدرول هشام عبدالعزيز)	BN (UMNO)	28,018; 53.71%
11th	P101	2004–2008	Markiman Kobiran (مركيمن كوبيرن)	BN (UMNO)	40,937; 69.27%
12th	P101	2008–2013	Che Rosli Che Mat (چئ رسل چئ مت)	PR (PAS)	36,124; 51.24%
13th	P101	2013–2015	Che Rosli Che Mat (چئ رسل چئ مت)	PR (PAS)	64,127; 57.78%
13th	P101	2015–2016	Che Rosli Che Mat (چئ رسل چئ مت)	PAS	64,127; 57.78%
13th	P101	2016–2018	Che Rosli Che Mat (چئ رسل چئ مت)	GS (PAS)	64,127; 57.78%
14th	P101	2018–2022	Hasanuddin Mohd Yunus (حسن الدين بن محمد يونس)	PH (AMANAH)	49,004; 55.53%
15th	P101	2022–present	Mohd Sany Hamzan (محمد ثاني حمدان)	PH (AMANAH)	58,382; 42.68%

=== State constituency ===
Parliamentary constituency	State constituency						
Parliamentary constituency	1955–59*	1959–1974	1974–1986	1986–1995	1995–2004	2004–2018	2018–present
Hulu Langat					Beranang		
Hulu Langat				Dusun Tua			
Hulu Langat				Kajang			
Hulu Langat				Semenyih		Semenyih	
Ulu Langat			Dusun Tua				
Ulu Langat			Kajang				
Ulu Langat			Semenyih				

=== Historical boundaries ===
State Constituency	Area				
State Constituency	1974	1984	1994	2003	2018
Beranang			Bandar Tasik Kesuma; Bangi; Bukit Mahkota; Rinching; Semenyih		
Dusun Tua	Dusun Tua; Hulu Langat; Sri Cheras; Taman Bukit Sekawan; Taman Segar Perdana			Dusun Tua; Hulu Langat; Sri Cheras; Sungai Long; Taman Segar Perdana	Dusun Tua; Hulu Langat; Sri Cheras; Taman Segar Perdana; Taman Tun Perak
Kajang	Balakong; Bandar Mahkota Cheras; Bandar Tun Hussein Onn; Jenaris; Sungai Long	Balakong; Bandar Mahkota Cheras; Bandar Tun Hussein Onn; Kampung Sungai Tangkas; Sungai Long	Bandar Baru Bangi; Bandar Mahkota Cheras; Kajang; Saujana Impian; Sungai Long	Bandar Mahkota Cheras; Bukit Dukung; Saujana Impian; Sungai Chua; Taman Tun Perak	
Semenyih	Bandar Tasik Kesuma; Bangi; Bukit Mahkota; Rinching; Kampung Sungai Tangkas	Bandar Tasik Kesuma; Bangi; Jenaris; Bukit Mahkota; Rinching		Bandar Tasik Kesuma; Beranang; Kajang Perdana; Kuala Pajam; Rinching	Bandar Tasik Kesuma; Bandar Seri Putra; Beranang; Kuala Pajam; Rinching

=== Current state assembly members ===
No.	State Constituency	Member	Coalition (Party)
N23	Dusun Tua	Johan Abd Aziz	BN (UMNO)
N24	Semenyih	Nushi Mahfodz	PN (PAS)

=== Local governments & postcodes ===
No.	State Constituency	Local Government	Postcode
N23	Dusun Tua	Kajang Municipal Council	43000 Kajang; 43100 Hulu Langat; 43200 Cheras; 43500 Semenyih; 43700 Beranang
N24	Semenyih	Kajang Municipal Council	43000 Kajang; 43100 Hulu Langat; 43200 Cheras; 43500 Semenyih; 43700 Beranang

== Election results ==
Malaysian general election, 2022
Party	Candidate	Votes	%	∆%
PH	Mohd Sany Hamzan	58,382	42.68	▲42.68
PN	Mohd Radzi Abd Latif	43,486	31.79	▲31.79
BN	Johan Abd Aziz	32,570	23.81	▼2.90
PEJUANG	Markiman Kobiran	1,655	1.21	▲1.21
Heritage	Abdul Rahman Jaafar	370	0.27	▲0.27
Independent	Mohamed Noortheen Ahamed Mustafa	326	0.24	▲0.24
Total valid votes		136,786	100.00	
Total rejected ballots		1,214		
Unreturned ballots		339		
Turnout		138,339	82.89	▼5.22
Registered electors		166,902		
Majority		14,896	10.89	▼17.92
PH hold		Swing		
Source(s) https://lom.agc.gov.my/ilims/upload/portal/akta/outputp/1753283/PUB612.pdf

Malaysian general election, 2018
Party	Candidate	Votes	%	∆%
PKR	Hasanuddin Mohd Yunus	49,004	55.53	▲55.53
BN	Azman Ahmad	23,580	26.72	▼15.50
PAS	Che Rosli Che Mat	15,663	17.75	▼40.03
Total valid votes		88,247	100.00	
Total rejected ballots		929		
Unreturned ballots		401		
Turnout		89,577	87.51	▼1.11
Registered electors		102,363		
Majority		25,424	28.81	▲13.52
PKR gain from PAS		Swing		?
Source(s) "His Majesty's Government Gazette - Notice of Contested Election, Parliament for the State of Selangor [P.U. (B) 239/2018]" (PDF). Attorney General's Chambers of Malaysia. 3 May 2018. Archived from the original (PDF) on 2019-07-19. "Federal Government Gazette - Results of Contested Election and Statements of the Poll after the Official Addition of Votes, Parliamentary Constituencies for the State of Selangor [P.U. (B) 313/2018]" (PDF). Attorney General's Chambers of Malaysia. 28 May 2018. Archived from the original (PDF) on 2019-07-19.

Malaysian general election, 2013
Party	Candidate	Votes	%	∆%
PAS	Che Rosli Che Mat	64,127	57.78	▲6.54
BN	Adzhaliza Mohd Nor	46,860	42.22	▼6.54
Total valid votes		110,987	100.00	
Total rejected ballots		1,335		
Unreturned ballots		534		
Turnout		112,856	88.62	▲8.55
Registered electors		127,347		
Majority		17,267	15.56	▲13.08
PAS hold		Swing		
Source(s) "Federal Government Gazette - Notice of Contested Election, Parliament for the State of Selangor [P.U. (B) 176/2013]" (PDF). Attorney General's Chambers of Malaysia. 26 April 2013. Archived from the original (PDF) on 2018-09-30. "Federal Government Gazette - Results of Contested Election and Statements of the Poll after the Official Addition of Votes, Parliamentary Constituencies for the State of Selangor [P.U. (B) 217/2013]" (PDF). Attorney General's Chambers of Malaysia. 22 May 2013. Archived from the original (PDF) on 2018-09-30.

Malaysian general election, 2008
Party	Candidate	Votes	%	∆%
PAS	Che Rosli Che Mat	36,124	51.24	▲20.51
BN	Markiman Kobiran	34,379	48.76	▼20.51
Total valid votes		70,503	100.00	
Total rejected ballots		1,401		
Unreturned ballots		418		
Turnout		72,322	80.07	▲3.56
Registered electors		90,319		
Majority		1,745	2.48	▼36.06
PAS gain from BN		Swing		?

Malaysian general election, 2004
Party	Candidate	Votes	%	∆%
BN	Markiman Kobiran	40,937	69.27	▲15.56
PAS	Yeop Adlan Che Rose	18,160	30.73	▲30.73
Total valid votes		59,097	100.00	
Total rejected ballots		1,625		
Unreturned ballots		487		
Turnout		61,209	76.51	▲0.89
Registered electors		80,001		
Majority		22,777	38.54	▲31.12
BN hold		Swing		

Malaysian general election, 1999
Party	Candidate	Votes	%	∆%
BN	Badrul Hisham Abdul Aziz	28,018	53.71	▼30.13
PKR	Mohd Nor Nawawi	24,152	46.29	▲46.29
Total valid votes		52,170	100.00	
Total rejected ballots		1,007		
Unreturned ballots		380		
Turnout		53,557	75.62	▲4.02
Registered electors		70,823		
Majority		3,866	7.42	▼60.26
BN hold		Swing		

Malaysian general election, 1995
Party	Candidate	Votes	%	∆%
BN	Badrul Hisham Abdul Aziz	38,172	83.84	▲23.00
S46	Mohd Zainal Abidin Abdul Mutalib	7,360	16.16	▲16.16
Total valid votes		45,532	100.00	
Total rejected ballots		1,678		
Unreturned ballots		583		
Turnout		47,793	71.60	▼4.58
Registered electors		67,001		
Majority		30,812	67.68	▲46.00
BN hold		Swing		

Malaysian general election, 1990
Party	Candidate	Votes	%	∆%
BN	Lee Kim Sai	28,714	60.84	▲3.46
DAP	Lim Ann Koon	18,483	39.16	▲4.83
Total valid votes		47,197	100.00	
Total rejected ballots		2,297		
Unreturned ballots		0		
Turnout		48,954	76.18	▲4.81
Register electors		64,264		
Majority		9,691	21.68	▼1.40
BN hold		Swing		

Malaysian general election, 1986
Party	Candidate	Votes	%	∆%
BN	Lee Kim Sai	22,217	57.38	▼3.97
DAP	Lam Man Yoon	13,292	34.33	▲3.12
SDP	Ahamad Kamari	3,208	8.29	▲8.29
Total valid votes		38,717	100.00	
Total rejected ballots		934		
Unreturned ballots		0		
Turnout		39,651	71.37	▲4.85
Registered electors		55,558		
Majority		8,925	23.05	▼7.09
BN hold		Swing		

Malaysian general election, 1982: Ulu Langat
Party	Candidate	Votes	%	∆%
BN	Rosemary Chow Poh Kheng	18,152	61.35	▲16.50
DAP	Zainal Rampak	9,236	31.21	▼10.28
PAS	Yusof Siddiq	2,201	7.44	▼0.47
Total valid votes		29,589	100.00	
Total rejected ballots		1,032		
Unreturned ballots		0		
Turnout		30,621	66.52	
Registered electors		46,033		
Majority		8,916	30.14	▲26.78
BN hold		Swing		

Malaysian general election, 1978: Ulu Langat
Party	Candidate	Votes	%	∆%
BN	Rosemary Chow Poh Kheng	12,539	44.85	▼28.09
DAP	Ong Kwai Leng	11,598	41.49	▲26.05
PAS	Zainal Abidin Mohd Sidek	2,212	7.91	▲7.91
Parti Rakyat Malaysia	Kampo Radjo Bagindo Kayo	902	3.23	▲3.23
PEKEMAS	Kamarulzaman Ibrahim	706	2.53	▼13.07
Total valid votes		27,957	100.00	
Total rejected ballots		1,005		
Unreturned ballots		0		
Turnout		28,962	76.82	▼1.50
Registered electors		37,702		
Majority		941	3.36	▼53.98
BN hold		Swing		

Malaysian general election, 1974: Ulu Langat
Party	Candidate	Votes	%
BN	Lee Siok Yew	14,651	72.94
PEKEMAS	Chen Soo Yin	3,134	15.60
DAP	Mohamed Yunus Said	3,102	15.44
Total valid votes		20,087	100.00
Total rejected ballots		985	
Unreturned ballots		800	
Turnout		21,872	78.32
Registered electors		22,289	
Majority		11,517	57.34
This was a new constituency created out of Langat which went to Alliance in the previous election.
