= Arutchelvan Subramaniam =

Malaysian politician

Arutchelvan s/o Subramaniam (29 June 1967) is the deputy chairman of Parti Sosialis Malaysia.

Better known as Arul, he contested on four occasions in the Selangor state assembly elections, losing in Semenyih in 2008, 2013 and 2018 before being defeated in Kajang in 2023.

A prominent figure in the human rights struggle and grassroots activism, he has claimed to have been arrested by the Malaysian police on more than 40 occasions.

== Early life ==
Arutchelvan was born on June 29, 1967 in Ipoh, Perak and studied Economics at Universiti Kebangsaan Malaysia. In 1987 amid the human rights and political crackdown Ops Lalang, he founded the Jawatankuasa Kebajikan Mahasiswa at UKM as a student activist.

He was initially attracted to Parti Sosialis Rakyat Malaysia, but was disappointed by that party's decision to drop the 'socialist' tag and revert to its original name of Parti Rakyat Malaysia. Upon graduating he became active in grassroots movements.

In 1992 he founded the Community Development Centre (CDC), a group working with plantation workers, factory workers, urban pioneers and Orang Asli. He was also instrumental in the setting up of the Plantation Workers Support Committee (JSML) in 1993 to fight for plantation workers housing issues and monthly wages.

In 1994, they staged a massive Labour Day demonstration at the heart of Kuala Lumpur surprising many people.

Arutchelvan also worked in leading human rights group Suaram from 1995 till 2006.

== PSM career ==
On May 1, 1998 Arutchelvan and other workers leaders officially submitted an application to register a new party known as the Socialist Party of Malaysia. Former PSRM central committee member and ex-ISA detainee Mohd Nasir Hashim was named pro-tem party chairman while Arutchelvan was named secretary general.

The Federal Government rejected the application to register as a political party alleging that PSM was a threat to national security, leading to PSM taking the government and the Home Minister to court alleging an abuse of power.

Although the Court of Appeal dismissed the national security argument on 16 August 2006, it upheld a separate reason to deny the registration of the PSM as a political party.

PSM then filed an appeal against the Court of Appeal's decision to the Federal Court of Malaysia. However, on 17 June 2008, the Home Ministry approved PSM's application as a political party just before Federal Court proceedings started, ending a 10-year tussle.

Ultimately Arutchelvan served as the secretary general of PSM from 1998 till 2015 and took over as deputy chairman in July 2019.

== Electoral contests ==
He first contested the Semenyih state assembly seat in 2008, running under the PKR banner as part of an agreement with that party. He garnered 10,448 votes, losing by a narrow margin of 1,140 votes to BN candidate Johan Abd Aziz.

However after the stunning victory at state level by Pakatan Rakyat, Arutchelvan was appointed as a Kajang municipal councillor serving from 2008 till 2013.

In 2013, he lost again to Johan, but on this occasion he ran under PSM's own banner while PKR ran its own candidate Hamidi Hasan. Arutchelvan came in third, securing 15 percent of the vote. Notably, the vote share of PKR and PSM in combination was higher than that of the winning BN candidate.

In 2018, Arutchelvan contested again in Semenyih. Pakatan Harapan's Bakhtiar Mohd Nor wrested the seat from Johan, with PAS candidate Mad Shahmiour Mat Kosim coming third. Arutchelvan trailed in last in the four-way contest with 1,293 votes.

Most recently he ran in Kajang for the 2023 Selangor state elections. The seat was won by Pakatan Harapan's David Cheong Kian Young who won 54,794 votes, while PN's Allan Liew Sin Kim got 20,400 votes and Arutchelvan bagged 2,681 votes which was 3.44 percent.

Despite his electoral fortunes, he has made his name by speaking out on issues such as fuel hikes, affordable housing, minimum wage, retrenchment fund, ISA abolishment and peaceful assembly.

== Election results ==
Selangor State Legislative Assembly
Year	Constituency	Candidate	Votes	Pct	Opponent(s)	Votes	Pct	Ballots cast	Majority	Turnout
2008	N24 Semenyih	Arutchelvan Subramaniam (PKR)^{1}	10,448	47.41%	Johan Abd Aziz (UMNO)	11,588	52.59%	28,203	1,140	81.30%
2013	N24 Semenyih	Arutchelvan Subramaniam (PSM)	5,568	15.19%	Johan Abd Aziz (UMNO)	17,922	48.89%	37,572	4,757	88.73%
2013	N24 Semenyih	Arutchelvan Subramaniam (PSM)	5,568	15.19%	Hamidi A. Hasan (PKR)	13,165	35.92%	37,572	4,757	88.73%
2018	N24 Semenyih	Arutchelvan Subramaniam (PSM)	1,293	2.80%	Bakhtiar Mohd Nor (BERSATU)	23,428	50.76%	46,572	8,964	87.45%
2018	N24 Semenyih	Arutchelvan Subramaniam (PSM)	1,293	2.80%	Johan Abd Aziz (UMNO)	14,464	31.34%	46,572	8,964	87.45%
2018	N24 Semenyih	Arutchelvan Subramaniam (PSM)	1,293	2.80%	Mad Shahmiour Mat Kosim (PAS)	6,966	15.09%	46,572	8,964	87.45%
2023	N25 Kajang	Arutchelvan Subramaniam (PSM)	2,681	3.44%	David Cheong Kian Young (PKR)	54,794	70.36%	77,875	34,394	70.93%
2023	N25 Kajang	Arutchelvan Subramaniam (PSM)	2,681	3.44%	Allan Liew Sin Kim (BERSATU)	20,400	26.20%	77,875	34,394	70.93%

Note: ^{1} Arutchelvan is a member of PSM who contested under the PKR ticket in the 2008 election.
