= 2019 Semenyih by-election =

- 2 March 2019

N24 Semenyih seat in the Selangor State Legislative Assembly
	Majority party	Minority party	Third party
	BN	PH	PSM
Candidate	Zakaria Hanafi	Muhammad Aiman Zainali	Nik Aziz Afiq Abdul
Party	UMNO	BERSATU	PSM
Alliance	BN	PH
Popular vote	19,780	17,866	847
Percentage	50.44%	45.56%	2.16%
	Fourth party
	IND
Candidate	Kuan Chee Heng
Party	Independent
Popular vote	725
Percentage	1.84%
- N24 Semenyih state constituency border and the districts included within the constituency.
MLA before election
Bakhtiar Mohd Nor (died)
Pakatan Harapan (BERSATU)
Elected MLA
Zakaria Hanafi
Barisan Nasional (UMNO)

The N24 Semenyih state constituency boundaries within the P101 Hulu Langat parliamentary constituency in Selangor.

A by-election was held on 2 March 2019 for the Selangor State Legislative Assembly seat of Semenyih. The seat became vacant after the death of the incumbent assemblyman, Bakhtiar Mohd Nor, 57, on 11 January 2019 from heart attack. Bakhtiar was a member of the Malaysian United Indigenous Party or Parti Pribumi Bersatu Malaysia (BERSATU), a component of Pakatan Harapan (PH) coalition.

The nomination day was on 16 February 2019, with a 2-week campaigning period until election day on 2 March 2019 and 26 February 2019 for early voting. The by-election used the third-quarter 2018 electoral roll that was updated until 11 January 2019, which the constituency has 53,411 eligible voters comprising 53,520 ordinary and 109 absentee voters.

Zakaria Hanafi from Barisan Nasional (BN) won the by-election. This was the first time a seat was gained by another party after PH won the 2018 general election (GE14).

== Nomination ==
PH had announced on 14 February that Hulu Langat BERSATU Treasurer, Muhammad Aiman Zainali who is also the son-in-law of previous Semenyih assemblyman Bakhtiar Mohd Nor who had died and sparked the by-election as their candidate for the by-election.

The Pan-Malaysian Islamic Party (PAS) had announced that they would make way for Barisan Nasional (BN) to contest in the by-election as the latter had more support in the constituency.

The previous BN election candidate Datuk Johan Abd Aziz of United Malays National Organisation (UMNO) who was also the former Semenyih assemblyman for two terms earlier before losing in GE14 to BERSATU, said on 22 January 2019 that he will not be contesting in the by-election.

BN on 14 February announced that former UKM administration officer, Zakaria Hanafi as their candidate for the by-election.

Socialist Party of Malaysia (PSM) on 13 February officially announced that Youth Member, Nik Aziz Afiq Abdul as their candidate for the by-election.

Malaysian People's Movement Party (Gerakan) initially had announced it is highly likely to contest in the by-election to serve as an indicator of the party performance after leaving BN coalition in 2018. On 14 February, somehow Gerakan decided to not contest in the by-election.

Social activist Kuan Chee Heng also known as "Uncle Kentang" or even "10-sen man" announced in his Facebook page that he will contest as an independent candidate. He is the Malaysian Society of Community Policing (CP) president and also a former policeman before leaving to become a florist.

On Nomination Day, candidates from PH, BN and PSM along with independent candidate Kuan Chee Heng (with telephone symbol) submitted their nomination papers. The by-election set for a four-cornered fight.

== Controversies and issues ==
After the announcement of the by-election, a registered voter Puan Sri Sabariah Mohd Shariff, 58, has filed on 11 February 2019 for an injunction to stop the Semenyih by-election, challenging the validity of the Election Commission (EC) as it was then run by only the chairman Azhar Azizan Harun, popularly known as Art Harun. Former EC deputy chairman Datuk Wan Ahmad Wan Omar suggested the Semenyih by-election be postponed pending a court hearing on the legitimacy of the EC currently run by only one person, the chairman and the case warranted urgent attention, as six other posts were vacant when the decision on nomination and polling dates were made but Article 114 (1) of the Federal Constitution clearly stated that the EC shall be appointed by the Yang di-Pertuan Agong after consultation with the Conference of Rulers, and shall consist of a chairman, a deputy chairman, and five other members. He hope the legitimacy of the EC must be verified, or else it would set a bad precedence.

EC chairman Azhar has welcomed lawsuit, calls it a 'good thing' and crucial for the development of a more transparent process. In a statement on 14 February, Chief Secretary to the Government Datuk Seri Dr Ismail Bakar said the Yang di-Pertuan Agong, Al-Sultan Abdullah Ri’ayatuddin Al-Mustafa Billah Shah, had on 14 February approved University of Malaya Law Faculty lecturer Dr Azmi Sharom's appointment as Election Commission (EC) deputy chairman and also approved the appointment of four EC members; Datuk Seri Ramlan Ibrahim, Datuk Chin Phaik Yoong, Dr Faisal S. Hazis and Zoe Randhawa. The appointments will be effective from the date the appointees report themselves as EC members, until they reach 66 years old. On 25 February, the High Court rejected the petition filed and dismissed the bid to stop the Semenyih by-election; allowing it to continue as planned.

On Nomination Day, BN supporters had chased after Youth and Sports Minister, Syed Saddiq and made offensive remarks against him. He alleged that UMNO Youth exco member and controversial blogger Wan Muhammad Azri Wan Deris, better known as Papagomo, had cornered him from a different route and put him in a headlock. While Papagomo claimed it was just a hug. Syed Saddiq later lodged a police report at Sungai Way police station and also go for a medical check-up. Papagomo was arrested over the alleged attempted assault on Syed Saddiq on 17 February and he was remanded for three days for investigation. Papagomo was charged on 28 February 2019 with two counts of intending to insult the modesty of the minister by saying to him 'ko bodoh' (you are stupid) and with voluntarily causing hurt on Syed Saddiq.

BN supporters were also reported to have heckled PSM members and supporters as well.

The car used to ferry BN candidate, Zakaria Hanafi was splashed with paint. His aide, Rahmad Musa found out about the issue. A BN supporter Mamat Awang, 59, from Kuala Terengganu, collapsed and died outside of the Nomination centre on Nomination Day.

During the campaigning period, independent candidate, Kuan Chee Heng has his campaign banner taken down. Furthermore, banners criticising BN and Rosmah Mansor, the wife of former Prime Minister Najib Razak were hung.

On Polling Day, BN complained about two cars carrying the PH symbols drove through restricted areas.

== Result ==
Selangor state by-election, March 2, 2019: Semenyih Upon the death of incumbent, Bakhtiar Mohd Nor
Party	Candidate	Votes	%	∆%
BN	Zakaria Hanafi	19,780	50.44	▲19.10
PH	Muhammad Aiman Zainali	17,866	45.56	▼5.20
Parti Sosialis Malaysia	Nik Aziz Afiq Abdul	847	2.16	▼0.64
Independent	Kuan Chee Heng	725	1.84	N/A
Total valid votes		38,518	100.00	
Total rejected ballots		650		
Unreturned ballots		50		
Turnout		39,218	73.3	↓
Registered electors		54,503		
Majority		1,914	4.88	
BN gain from PH		Swing		.

=== Results according to polling district ===
Voting District Code	Voting District	Party
101/24/01	Semenyih Barat	PH
101/24/02	Hulu Semenyih	BN
101/24/03	Tarun	PH
101/24/04	Kampong Tanjong	BN
101/24/05	Kampung Baharu Semenyih	PH
101/24/06	Pekan Semenyih	PH
101/24/07	Semenyih Selatan	BN
101/24/08	Kampung Rinching	BN
101/24/09	Bandar Rinching Seksyen 1-4	PH
101/24/10	Sesapan Kelubi	BN
101/24/11	Sesapan Batu	BN
101/24/12	Sungai Jai	BN
101/24/13	Beranang	BN
101/24/14	Kuala Pajam	BN
101/24/15	Sungai Kembung	BN
101/24/16	Sesapan Batu Rembau	BN
101/24/17	Kampung Batu 26 Beranang	BN
101/24/18	Penjara Kajang	BN
101/24/19	Semenyih Indah	PH
101/24/20	Bandar Rinching Seksyen 5-6	BN
101/24/21	Bandar Tasik Kesuma	BN
101/24/22	Kantan Permai	BN
101/24/23	Bukit Mahkota	BN

Early and post votes

Voting District	Party
Post Vote	BN
Early Vote	BN

== Previous result ==
Selangor state election, 2018: Semenyih
Party	Candidate	Votes	%	∆%
PKR	Bakhtiar Mohd Nor (Note: Pakatan Harapan candidates contested using PKR tickets in this election.)	23,428	50.76	+ 14.84
BN	Johan Abd Aziz	14,464	31.34	17.55
PAS	Mad Shahmiour Mat Kosim	6,966	15.09	+ 15.09
Parti Sosialis Malaysia	Arutchelvan Subramaniams	1,293	2.80	12.39
Total valid votes		46,151	100.00	
Total rejected ballots		366		
Unreturned ballots		55		
Turnout		46,572	87.45	
Registered electors		53,257		
Majority		8,964	19.42	
PKR gain from BN		Swing		.
