= Mohamed Haniffa Abdullah =

Yang Berhormat Senator Tan Sri Dato' Mohamed Haniffa Abdullah PSM, PJN, DIMP (Pahang), MBBS (Tanjore)

Member of the Dewan Negara

Appointment by Yang di-Pertuan Agong
- Incumbent
- Assumed office 29 September 2022

Chairman of the Social Security Organisation
- In office 15 June 2020 – 3 October 2022
- Prime Minister: Muhyiddin Yassin; Ismail Sabri Yaakob
- Minister: Saravanan Murugan
- Preceded by: Aseh Che Mat
- Succeeded by: Subahan Kamal

Personal details
- Born: Mohamed Haniffa bin Abdullah; 1949 (age 76–77)
- Party: Independent
- Spouse: Mumtaz Begum
- Children: 2
- Occupation: Politician
- Profession: Doctor

Mohamed Haniffa Abdullah is a Malaysian medical officer, civil servant and politician of Indian descent. He currently serves as a Senator representing the Barisan Nasional and the Malaysian Indian Congress (MIC), appointed by the Yang di-Pertuan Agong since 20 September 2022. He is the founder of MAHSA University and is also the former Chairman of the Social Security Organisation, succeeding Aseh Che Mat. He is also a Council Member of the Malaysian Qualifications Agency.

== Career ==
Haniffa obtained his medical degree from the University of Madras, India. He began his career as a medical officer at the Klang Hospital and Sabak Bernam Hospital. In 2004, he founded MAHSA College, now known as MAHSA University, a renowned higher education institution in the field of health and medical sciences.

Apart from his academic roles, Haniffa is also the Chairman of the Social Security Organisation (SOCSO) and the Chairman of the Foreign Workers Medical Examination Monitoring Agency (FOMEMA). He also serves as a Council Member of the Malaysian Qualifications Agency (MQA), which is responsible for the assessment and accreditation of higher education programmes in the country.

== Honours ==
List of honours:

- Malaysia
  - Panglima Setia Mahkota (PSM) - Tan Sri (2015)
  - Panglima Jasa Negara (PJN) - Datuk (2002)
- Pahang
  - Darjah Indera Mahkota Pahang (DIMP) - Dato (1998)
