= David Cheong Kian Young =

Malaysian politician and businessman

Yang Berhormat Tuan David Cheong Kian Young MLA
- 张睷洋

Member of the Selangor State Legislative Assembly for Kajang
- Incumbent
- Assumed office 12 August 2023
- Preceded by: Hee Loy Sian (PH–PKR)
- Majority: 34,394 (2023)

Personal details
- Born: David Cheong Kian Young; 6 July 1965 (age 61) Kuala Langat, Selangor, Malaysia
- Citizenship: Malaysian
- Party: People's Justice Party (PKR)
- Other political affiliations: Pakatan Harapan (PH)
- Children: 3
- Education: Dharma Buddhist University (MA at Buddhism research works & diploma at architecture)
- Occupation: Politician; businessman

David Cheong Kian Young

Chinese name
- Traditional Chinese: 張睷洋
- Simplified Chinese: 张睷洋
Transcriptions
Standard Mandarin
- Hanyu Pinyin: Zhāng Jiānyáng

David Cheong Kian Young (simplified Chinese: 张睷洋; traditional Chinese: 張睷洋; pinyin: Zhāng Jiānyáng; born 6 July 1965) is a Malaysian politician and businessman who has served as Member of the Selangor State Legislative Assembly (MLA) for Kajang since August 2023. He is a member of the People's Justice Party (PKR), a component party of the Pakatan Harapan (PH) coalition. He has also served as Member of the Central Leadership Council (MPP), Deputy Division Chief of Kuala Langat and deputy director of the State Elections Department (JPRN) of PKR as well as the Treasurer of JPRN of PH of Selangor since 2022.

== Political career ==
He served as the Chairman of the Polling District Committee (JDM) of PKR of Sungai Jarom from 2008 to 2010, State Deputy Chairman of the Welfare Bureau of PKR of Selangor from 2010 to 2013 and the Treasurer of JPRN of Selangor from 2020 to 2022.

=== Member of the Selangor State Legislative Assembly (since 2023) ===
==== 2023 Selangor state election ====
In the 2023 Selangor state election, Cheong made his electoral debut after being nominated by PH to contest the Kajang state seat. Cheong won the seat and was elected to the Selangor State Legislative Assembly as the Kajang MLA after defeating Allan Liew Sin Kim of Perikatan Nasional (PN) and Arutchelvan Subramaniam of Parti Sosialis Malaysia (PSM) by a majority of 34,394 votes.

== Election results ==
Selangor State Legislative Assembly
Year	Constituency	Candidate	Votes	Pct	Opponent(s)	Votes	Pct	Ballots cast	Majority	Turnout
2023	N25 Kajang	David Cheong Kian Young (PKR)	54,794	70.36%	Allan Liew Sin Kim (BERSATU)	20,400	26.20%	77,875	34,394	70.93%
2023	N25 Kajang	David Cheong Kian Young (PKR)	54,794	70.36%	Arutchelvan Subramaniam (PSM)	2,681	3.44%	77,875	34,394	70.93%
