= Social Security Act (disambiguation) =

The Social Security Act refers to government welfare spending legislation:

- Social Security Act 1991, for Australia
- Social Security Board (Belize), for Belize
- Unorganised Workers' Social Security Act 2008, for India
- Employees' Social Security Act 1969, for Malaysia
- Social Security Act 1938, for New Zealand
- Social Security System (Philippines), for the Philippines
- Social Security (Scotland) Act 2018, for Scotland
- Social security in Spain, for Spain
- Social Security Administration Act 1992, for the United Kingdom
- Social Security Contributions and Benefits Act 1992, for the United Kingdom
- Ministry of Social Security Act 1966, for the United Kingdom
- Social Security Act of 1935, for the United States
- Social Security Act of 1965, for the United States
