= Johan Abd Aziz =

Malaysian politician

Yang Berhormat Datuk Wira Johan Abd Aziz DCSM DPSM MLA
- جوهن عبدالعزيز
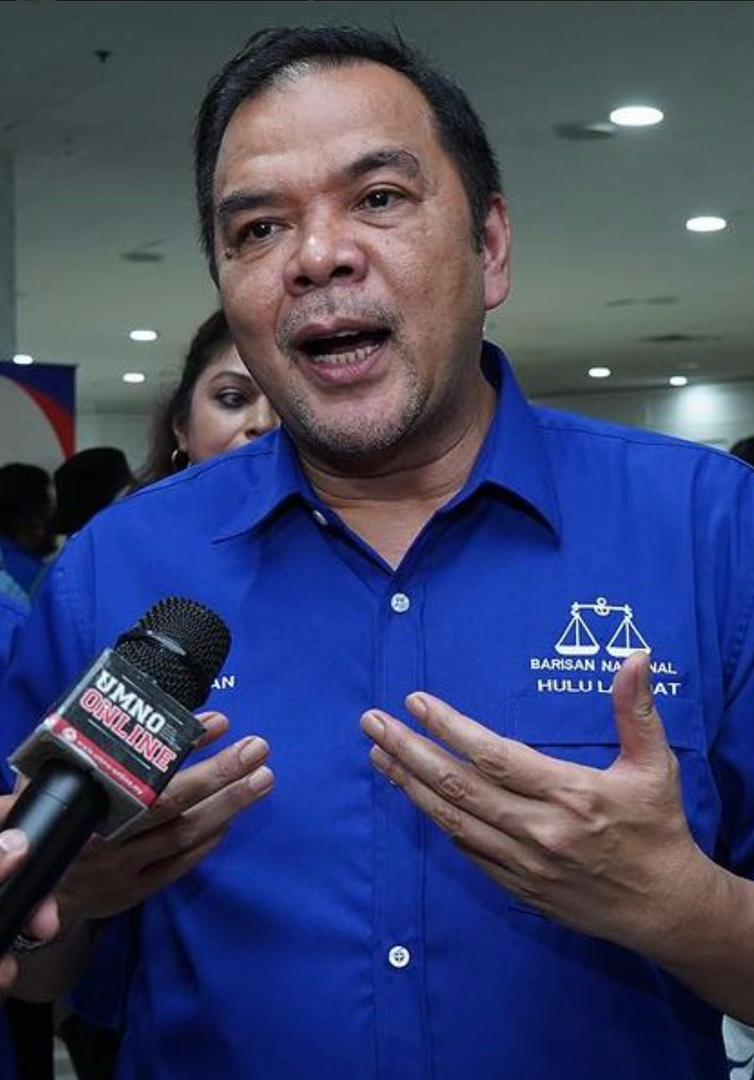

Deputy State Chairman of Barisan Nasional of Selangor
- Incumbent
- Assumed office 25 November 2022
- National chairman: Ahmad Zahid Hamidi
- Preceded by: Megat Zulkarnain Omardin

Deputy State Chairman of the United Malays National Organisation of Selangor
- Incumbent
- Assumed office 25 November 2022
- President: Ahmad Zahid Hamidi
- Preceded by: Megat Zulkarnain Omardin

Member of the Selangor State Legislative Assembly for Dusun Tua
- Incumbent
- Assumed office 12 August 2023
- Preceded by: Edry Faizal Eddy Yusof (PH–DAP)
- Succeeded by: 3,014 (2023)

Member of the Selangor State Legislative Assembly for Semenyih
- In office 8 March 2008 – 9 May 2018
- Preceded by: Ahmad Kuris Mohd Nor (BN–UMNO)
- Succeeded by: Bakhtiar Mohd Nor (PH–BERSATU)
- Majority: 1,140 (2008); 4,757 (2013)

Personal details
- Born: Johan bin Abdul Aziz
- Citizenship: Malaysian
- Party: United Malays National Organisation (UMNO)
- Other political affiliations: Barisan Nasional (BN)
- Education: University of Technology MARA (BBA)
- Occupation: Politician
- Johan Abd Aziz on Facebook; Johan Abd Aziz on TikTok

Johan bin Abdul Aziz (Jawi: جوهن عبدالعزيز, Malay pronunciation: [dʒohan]) is a Malaysian politician who has served as Member of the Selangor State Legislative Assembly (MLA) for Dusun Tua since August 2023. He served as the MLA for Semenyih from May 2008 to May 2018. He is a member of the United Malays National Organisation (UMNO), a component party of the Barisan Nasional (BN) coalition. He has served as the Deputy State Chairman of BN and UMNO Selangor and a Member of the UMNO Supreme Council since November 2022. He is also one of the only two BN and UMNO Selangor MLAs alongside MLA for Sungai Air Tawar Rizam Ismail.

== Political career ==
=== State electoral history ===
Johan Abd Aziz had first became the Member of the Selangor State Legislative Assembly for Semenyih in 2008 Malaysian state elections. He was then elected for two consecutive terms after losing the seat to Bakhtiar Mohd Nor of Pakatan Harapan (PH) during the political wave in 2018. He then made a comeback during the 2023 Selangor state election by winning the Dusun Tua state constituency under the BN ticket.

=== Parliamentary candidacy ===
In the 2022 general election, Johan Abd Aziz made his parliamentary debut for BN to contest the Hulu Langat federal seat. He eventually lost to Mohd Sany Hamzan of Pakatan Harapan (PH) by placing third behind Perikatan Nasional (PN).

=== Career in UMNO and BN ===
Johan was appointed the new Deputy State Chairman of BN and UMNO Selangor to replace Megat Zulkarnain Omardin who became the new State Chairman of BN and UMNO Selangor. Johan is also the UMNO Division Chief of Hulu Langat and the former State Secretary of UMNO Selangor.

== Election results ==
Parliament of Malaysia
Year	Constituency	Candidate	Votes	Pct	Opponent(s)	Votes	Pct	Ballots cast	Majority	Turnout
2022	P101 Hulu Langat	Johan Abd Aziz (UMNO)	32,570	23.81%	Mohd Sany Hamzan (AMANAH)	58,382	42.68%	138,339	14,896	82.89%
2022	P101 Hulu Langat	Johan Abd Aziz (UMNO)	32,570	23.81%	Mohd Radzi Abd Latif (BERSATU)	43,486	31.79%	138,339	14,896	82.89%
2022	P101 Hulu Langat	Johan Abd Aziz (UMNO)	32,570	23.81%	Markiman Kobiran (PEJUANG)	1,655	1.21%	138,339	14,896	82.89%
2022	P101 Hulu Langat	Johan Abd Aziz (UMNO)	32,570	23.81%	Mohamed Mustafa (IND)	326	0.24%	138,339	14,896	82.89%

Selangor State Legislative Assembly
Year	Constituency	Candidate	Votes	Pct	Opponent(s)	Votes	Pct	Ballots cast	Majority	Turnout
2008	N24 Semenyih	Johan Abd Aziz (UMNO)	11,588	52.59%	Arutchelvan Subramaniam (PKR)	10,448	47.41%	28,203	1,140	81.30%
2013	N24 Semenyih	Johan Abd Aziz (UMNO)	17,922	48.89%	Hamidi A. Hasan (PKR)	13,165	35.92%	37,572	4,757	88.73%
2013	N24 Semenyih	Johan Abd Aziz (UMNO)	17,922	48.89%	Arutchelvan Subramaniam (PSM)	5,568	15.19%	37,572	4,757	88.73%
2018	N24 Semenyih	Johan Abd Aziz (UMNO)	14,464	31.34%	Bakhtiar Mohd Nor (BERSATU)	23,428	50.76%	53,257	8,964	87.45%
2018	N24 Semenyih	Johan Abd Aziz (UMNO)	14,464	31.34%	Mad Shahmiour Mat Kosim (PAS)	6,966	15.09%	53,257	8,964	87.45%
2023	N23 Dusun Tua	Johan Abd Aziz (UMNO)	26,755	49.91%	Azhar Hambali (BERSATU)	23,741	44.29%	53,912	3,014	72.44%
2023	N23 Dusun Tua	Johan Abd Aziz (UMNO)	26,755	49.91%	Al Hafiz Ikhwan Mohamad Asaad (MUDA)	3,110	5.80%	53,912	3,014	72.44%

== Honours ==
- Malacca
  - Lieutenant of the Exalted Order of Malacca (DPSM) – Datuk (2010)
  - Commander of the Exalted Order of Malacca (DCSM) – Datuk Wira (2022)
