= Che Rosli Che Mat =

Malaysian politician (born 1951)

- چئ رسل چئ مت

Member of the Malaysian Parliament for Hulu Langat
- In office 8 March 2008 – 9 May 2018
- Preceded by: Markiman Kobiran (BN–UMNO)
- Succeeded by: Hasanuddin Mohd Yunus (PH–AMANAH)
- Majority: 1,745 (2008); 17,267 (2013)

Personal details
- Born: Che Rosli bin Che Mat; 16 July 1951 (age 74) Arau, Perlis, Federation of Malaya (now Malaysia)
- Party: Pan-Malaysian Islamic Party (PAS)
- Other political affiliations: Barisan Alternatif (BA) (1999–2004); Pakatan Rakyat (PR) (2008–2015); Gagasan Sejahtera (2018–2020); Perikatan Nasional (PN) (2020–present); Muafakat Nasional (MN)
- Occupation: Politician, lecturer

Che Rosli bin Che Mat (born 16 July 1951) is a Malaysian politician. He was the Member of the Parliament of Malaysia for the Hulu Langat constituency in Selangor for two terms (2008-2018). He is a member of the Pan-Malaysian Islamic Party (PAS).

Che Rosli was elected to Parliament in the 2008 election, winning the seat of Hulu Langat, which had previously been held by the ruling Barisan Nasional coalition. He defended the seat in the 2013 election successfully with an even bigger majority. However, in the 2018 election, he failed to defend his parliamentary seat, garnering only 17.75% of the votes cast and was in the last place, just behind BN's Azman Ahmad who garnered 26.72% of the votes. In the 2004 election, he contested but lost the seat of Simpang Empat in the State Assembly of Perlis.

Before entering politics, Che Rosli was a lecturer in nuclear science.

== Election results ==
Perlis State Legislative Assembly
Year	Constituency	Candidate	Votes	Pct	Opponent(s)	Votes	Pct	Ballots cast	Majority	Turnout
1999	N14 Simpang Empat	Che Rosli Che Mat (PAS)	2,336	47.48%	Zahari Bakar (UMNO)	2,584	52.52%	5,033	248	80.43%
2004	N14 Simpang Empat	Che Rosli Che Mat (PAS)	2,519	47.40%	Zahari Bakar (UMNO)	2,795	52.60%	5,447	276	83.11%

Parliament of Malaysia
Year	Constituency	Candidate	Votes	Pct	Opponent(s)	Votes	Pct	Ballots cast	Majority	Turnout
2008	P101 Hulu Langat	Che Rosli Che Mat (PAS)	36,124	51.24%	Markiman Kobiran (UMNO)	17,934	48.76%	72,322	1,745	80.07%
2013	P101 Hulu Langat	Che Rosli Che Mat (PAS)	64,127	57.78%	Adzhaliza Mohd Nor (UMNO)	46,860	42.22%	112,872	17,267	88.63%
2018	P101 Hulu Langat	Che Rosli Che Mat (PAS)	15,663	17.75%	Hasanuddin Mohd Yunus (AMANAH)	49,004	55.53%	89,577	25,424	87.51%
2018	P101 Hulu Langat	Che Rosli Che Mat (PAS)	15,663	17.75%	Azman Ahmad (UMNO)	23,580	26.72%	89,577	25,424	87.51%
