= Ismail Sani =

Malaysian politician

Member of the Selangor State Legislative Assembly for Dusun Tua
- In office 8 March 2008 – 5 May 2013
- Preceded by: Rahmad Musa (BN–UMNO)
- Succeeded by: Razaly Hassan (PR–PAS)
- Majority: 1,963 (2008)

Personal details
- Born: 15 April 1967 (age 59)
- Party: United Malays National Organisation (UMNO)
- Other political affiliations: Barisan Nasional (BN)

Ismail bin Sani (born 15 April 1967) was a Malaysian politician. He was the Member of the Selangor State Legislative Assembly (MLA) for Dusun Tua from March 2008 to May 2013. He is a member of the United Malays National Organisation (UMNO), a component party of Barisan Nasional (BN) coalitions.

== Election results ==
Selangor State Legislative Assembly
Year	Constituency	Candidate	Votes	Pct	Opponent(s)	Votes	Pct	Ballots cast	Majority	Turnout
2008	N23 Dusun Tua	Ismail Sani (UMNO)	13,542	53.91%	Mohd Sany Hamzan (PAS)	11,579	46.09%	25,580	1,963	79.32%
2013	N23 Dusun Tua	Ismail Sani (UMNO)	18,090	44.94%	Razaly Hassan (PAS)	22,161	55.06%	40,852	4,071	88.74%
