= Mohd Sany Hamzan =

Malaysian politician and teacher (born 1978)

Yang Berhormat Tuan Mohd Sany Hamzan MP
- محمد ثاني حمدان
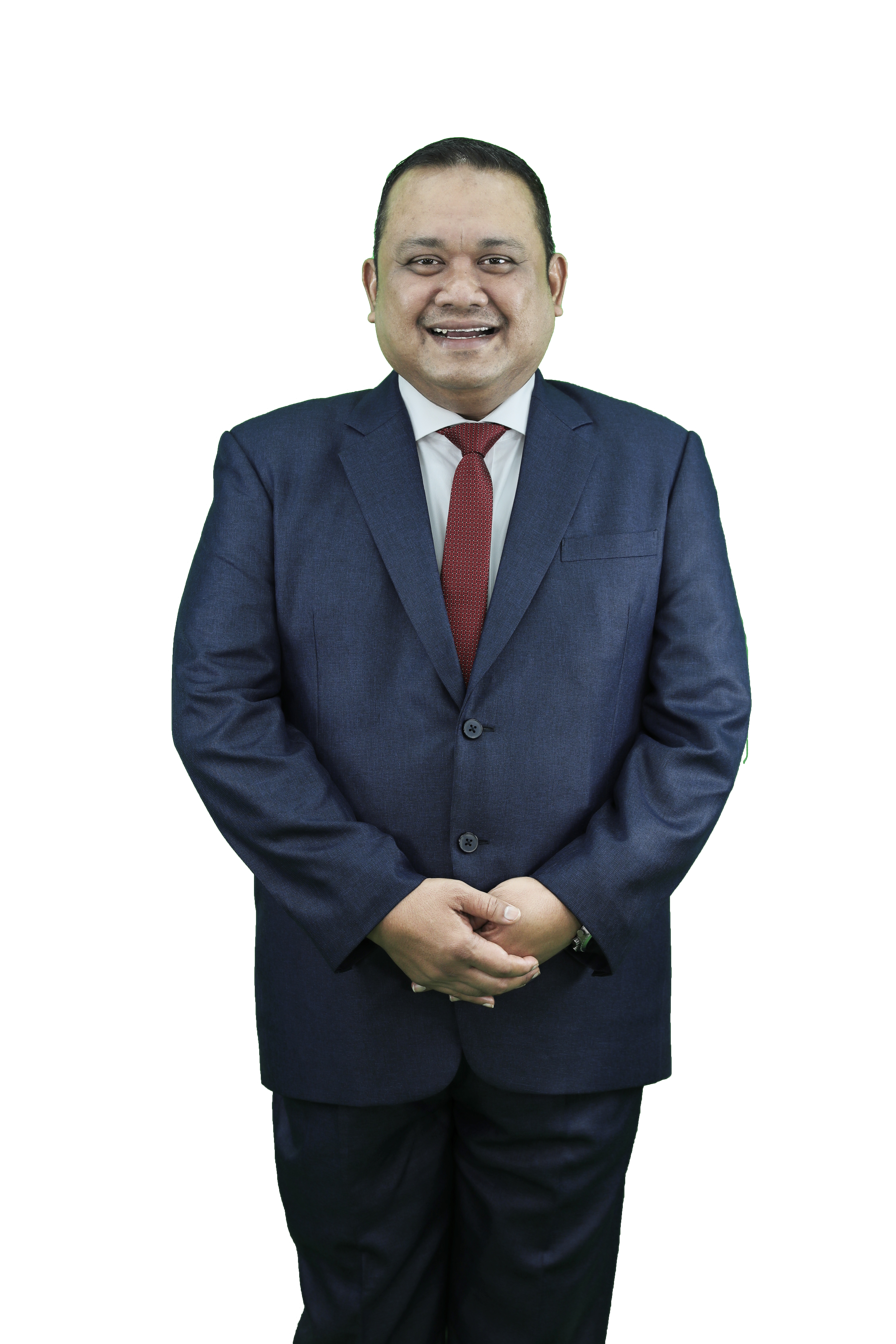
- Mohd Sany in 2023

Member of the Malaysian Parliament for Hulu Langat
- Incumbent
- Assumed office 19 November 2022
- Preceded by: Hasanuddin Mohd Yunus (PH–AMANAH)
- Majority: 14,896 (2022)

Member of the Selangor State Legislative Assembly for Taman Templer
- In office 9 May 2018 – 12 August 2023
- Preceded by: Zaidy Abdul Talib (PR–PAS)
- Succeeded by: Anfaal Saari (PH–AMANAH)
- Majority: 7,903 (2018)

1st Youth Chief of the National Trust Party
- In office 2016–2018
- President: Mohamad Sabu
- Preceded by: Position established
- Succeeded by: Hasnul Zulkarnain Abdul Munaim

Personal details
- Born: Mohd Sany bin Hamzan; 19 December 1978 (age 47) Selangor, Malaysia
- Party: Malaysian Islamic Party (PAS) (–2015); National Trust Party (AMANAH) (since 2015)
- Other political affiliations: Pakatan Rakyat (PR) (2008–2015); Pakatan Harapan (PH) (since 2015)
- Education: Lincoln University College
- Occupation: Politician
- Profession: Teacher

Mohd Sany bin Hamzan (born 19 December 1978) is a Malaysian politician and teacher who has served as the Member of Parliament (MP) for Hulu Langat since November 2022. He served as Member of the Selangor State Legislative Assembly (MLA) for Taman Templer from May 2018 to August 2023. He is a member of the National Trust Party (AMANAH), a component party of the Pakatan Harapan (PH) coalition and was a member of the Malaysian Islamic Party (PAS), then component party of the Pakatan Rakyat (PR) coalition. He served as the 1st Youth Chief of AMANAH from 2016 to 2018 and Youth Elections Director of PAS from 2013 to 2015.

== Political career ==
=== Candidate for Member of the Selangor State Legislative Assembly (2008) ===
In the 2008 Selangor state election, Mohd Sany made his electoral debut after being nominated by PR to contest for the Dusun Tua state seat. He was not elected as the Dusun Tua MLA after losing to Ismail Sani of Barisan Nasional (BN) by a minority of 1,963 votes.

=== Member of the Selangor State Legislative Assembly (2018–2023) ===
In the 2018 Selangor state election, Mohd Sany was nominated by PH to contest for the Taman Templer state seat. He won the seat and was elected to the Selangor State Legislative Assembly as the Taman Templer MLA for the first term after defeating Zaidy Abdul Talib of Gagasan Sejahtera (GS), Md Nasir Ibrahim of BN, Rajandran Batumalai of the People's Alternative Party (PAP) and Koh Swe Yong of Parti Rakyat Malaysia (PRM) by a majority of 7,903 votes.

In the 2023 Selangor state election, Mohd Sany decided against being nominated to contest in the election.

=== Member of Parliament (since 2022) ===
In the 2022 Malaysian general election, Mohd Sany was nominated by PH to contest for the Hulu Langat federal seat. He won the seat and was elected as the Hulu Langat MP for the first term after defeating Mohd Radzi Abd Latif of Perikatan Nasional (PN), Johan Abdul Aziz of BN, Markiman Kobiran of the Homeland Fighters Party (PEJUANG), Abdul Rahman Jaafar of the Heritage Party (WARISAN) and independent candidate Mohamed Noortheen Ahamed Mustafa by a majority of 14,896 votes.

== Election results ==
Selangor State Legislative Assembly
Year	Constituency	Candidate	Votes	Pct	Opponent(s)	Votes	Pct	Ballots cast	Majority	Turnout
2008	N23 Dusun Tua	Mohd Sany Hamzan (PAS)	11,579	46.09%	Ismail Sani (UMNO)	13,542	53.91%	25,580	1,963	79.32%
2018	N15 Taman Templer	Mohd Sany Hamzan (AMANAH)	18,362	50.14%	Zaidy Abdul Talib (PAS)	10,459	28.58%	37,111	7,903	85.18%
2018	N15 Taman Templer	Mohd Sany Hamzan (AMANAH)	18,362	50.14%	Md Nasir Ibrahim (UMNO)	7,580	20.72%	37,111	7,903	85.18%
2018	N15 Taman Templer	Mohd Sany Hamzan (AMANAH)	18,362	50.14%	Rajandran Batumalai (PAP)	108	0.30%	37,111	7,903	85.18%
2018	N15 Taman Templer	Mohd Sany Hamzan (AMANAH)	18,362	50.14%	Koh Swe Yong (PRM)	82	0.22%	37,111	7,903	85.18%

Parliament of Malaysia
Year	Constituency	Candidate	Votes	Pct	Opponent(s)	Votes	Pct	Ballots cast	Majority	Turnout
2022	P101 Hulu Langat	Mohd Sany Hamzan (AMANAH)	58,382	42.68%	Mohd Radzi Abd Latif (BERSATU)	43,486	31.79%	136,789	14,896	81.96%
2022	P101 Hulu Langat	Mohd Sany Hamzan (AMANAH)	58,382	42.68%	Johan Abd Aziz (UMNO)	32,570	23.81%	136,789	14,896	81.96%
2022	P101 Hulu Langat	Mohd Sany Hamzan (AMANAH)	58,382	42.68%	Markiman Kobiran (PEJUANG)	1,655	1.21%	136,789	14,896	81.96%
2022	P101 Hulu Langat	Mohd Sany Hamzan (AMANAH)	58,382	42.68%	Abdul Rahman Jaafar (WARISAN)	370	0.27%	136,789	14,896	81.96%
2022	P101 Hulu Langat	Mohd Sany Hamzan (AMANAH)	58,382	42.68%	Mohamed Noortheen Ahamed Mustafa (IND)	326	0.24%	136,789	14,896	81.96%

== Honours ==
=== Honours of Malaysia ===
- Malaysia
  - Recipient of the 17th Yang di-Pertuan Agong Installation Medal (2024)
