= Anfaal Saari =

Malaysian politician

Yang Berhormat Puan Anfaal Saari MLA
- أنفال شاعري

Member of the Selangor State Executive Council
- Incumbent
- Assumed office 21 August 2023
- Monarch: Sharafuddin
- Menteri Besar: Amirudin Shari
- Portfolio: Women and Family Empowerment, Social Welfare & Care Economy (Note: Assumed portfolios on 23 August 2023.)
- Preceded by: Siti Mariah Mahmud (Women and Family Empowerment); Portfolios established (Social Welfare & Care Economy)
- Constituency: Taman Templer

Member of the Selangor State Legislative Assembly for Taman Templer
- Incumbent
- Assumed office 12 August 2023
- Preceded by: Mohd Sany Hamzan (PH–AMANAH)
- Majority: 467 (2023)

Deputy Women Chief of the National Trust Party
- Incumbent
- Assumed office 22 December 2023
- President: Mohamad Sabu
- Women Chief: Aiman Athirah Sabu
- Preceded by: Nor Hayati Bachok

Personal details
- Born: Anfaal binti Saari
- Citizenship: Malaysian
- Party: National Trust Party (AMANAH)
- Other political affiliations: Pakatan Harapan (PH)
- Parent: Saari Sungib (father)
- Occupation: Politician

Anfaal binti Saari is a Malaysian politician who has served as Member of the Selangor State Executive Council (EXCO) in the Pakatan Harapan (PH) state administration under Menteri Besar Amirudin Shari and Member of the Selangor State Legislative Assembly (MLA) for Taman Templer since August 2023. She served as Member of the Ampang Jaya Municipal Council (MPAJ). She is a member and Division Women Chief of Gombak of the National Trust Party (AMANAH), a component party of the PH coalition. She has also served as the Deputy Women Chief of AMANAH since December 2023. She is also presently one of the only two AMANAH Selangor EXCO Members alongside Izham Hashim, one of the only two female Selangor EXCO Members alongside Jamaliah Jamaluddin and the daughter of former Hulu Kelang MLA Saari Sungib.

== Political career ==
=== Member of the Selangor State Executive Council (since 2023) ===
In the 2023 Selangor state election, the ruling PH and Barisan Nasional (BN) won a simple majority in the Selangor State Legislative Assembly and was reelected to power. Following that, Sungai Tua MLA Amirudin of PH was reappointed the Menteri Besar. Anfaal was appointed the Selangor EXCO Member and given the portfolios of Women and Family Empowerment, Social Welfare and Care Economy by Menteri Besar Amirudin on 21 and 23 August 2023 respectively.

=== Member of the Selangor State Legislative Assembly (since 2023) ===
==== 2023 Selangor state election ====
In the 2023 Selangor state election, Anfaal made her electoral debut after being nominated by PH to contest the Taman Templer state seat. Anfaal won the seat and was elected to the Selangor State Legislative Assembly as the Taman Templer MLA for the first term after narrowly defeating Zaidy Abdul Talib of Perikatan Nasional (PN) and Aida Rahman of the Malaysian United Democratic Alliance (MUDA) by a majority of only 467 votes.

== Election results ==
Selangor State Legislative Assembly
Year	Constituency	Candidate	Votes	Pct	Opponent(s)	Votes	Pct	Ballots cast	Majority	Turnout
2023	N15 Taman Templer	Anfaal Saari (AMANAH)	22,247	49.67%	Zaidy Abdul Talib (PAS)	21,780	48.62%	44,792	467	71.12%
2023	N15 Taman Templer	Anfaal Saari (AMANAH)	22,247	49.67%	Aida Rahman (MUDA)	765	1.71%	44,792	467	71.12%
