= Zainal Abidin Ahmad (Malaysian politician) =

Malaysian politician

Yang Berbahagia Dato' Zainal Abidin Ahmad DPMS SMS
- زين العابدين أحمد

Member of the Malaysian Parliament for Hulu Selangor
- In office 8 March 2008 – 25 March 2010
- Preceded by: Palanivel Govindasamy (BN–MIC)
- Succeeded by: P. Kamalanathan (BN–MIC)
- Majority: 198 (2008)

Deputy Menteri Besar of Selangor
- In office 1995–1999
- Monarch: Salahuddin
- Menteri Besar: Muhammad Muhammad Taib; Abu Hassan Omar
- Constituency: Dusun Tua

Member of the Selangor State Legislative Assembly for Dusun Tua
- In office 1990–2004
- Succeeded by: Rahmad Musa (BN–UMNO)

Personal details
- Born: 10 October 1939 Selangor, British Malaya
- Died: 25 March 2010 (aged 70)
- Party: United Malays National Organisation (UMNO) (–2005); People's Justice Party (PKR) (2005–2010)
- Other political affiliations: Barisan Nasional (BN) (–2005); Pakatan Rakyat (2008–2010)
- Spouse: Siti Zaharah Mohd Zin
- Children: 4
- Occupation: Politician

Zainal Abidin Ahmad (10 October 1939 – 25 March 2010) was a Malaysian politician. He was the Member of the Parliament of Malaysia for the Hulu Selangor constituency in Selangor until his death in 2010. He was a member of the Parti Keadilan Rakyat (PKR) party in the Pakatan Rakyat opposition coalition.

Zainal Abidin was a member of the State Assembly of Selangor from 1990 for Dusun Tua from the UMNO party, replacing Mohamed Azmir Mat Nazir. However, he was omitted from the ticket of the governing Barisan Nasional coalition for the 2004 election. From 1995 to 1999, he served as Deputy Menteri Besar (Chief Minister) and on the Selangor Executive Council.

Zainal Abidin switched to the opposition Keadilan party in 2005. In the 2008 election, Zainal won the federal seat of Hulu Selangor, unseating the incumbent Barisan Nasional member by a narrow margin of 198 votes.

Zainal Abidin died on 25 March 2010 from brain cancer, triggering a by-election in Hulu Selangor which was won by YB P. Kamalanathan of (MIC) – (BN).

== Election results ==
Selangor State Legislative Assembly
Year	Constituency	Candidate	Votes	Pct	Opponent(s)	Votes	Pct	Ballots cast	Majority	Turnout
1990	N22 Dusun Tua	Zainal Abidin Ahmad (UMNO)	11,153	75.18%	Mohd Arbawi Mohd Anuar (S46)	3,683	24.82%	15,615	7,470	78.01%
1995	N22 Dusun Tua	Zainal Abidin Ahmad (UMNO)	12,437	88.07%	Mohd Arbawi Mohd Anuar (S46)	1,685	11.93%	15,022	10,752	73.27%
1999	N22 Dusun Tua	Zainal Abidin Ahmad (UMNO)	9,518	61.61%	Md. Fadzil Hassan (PAS)	5,930	38.39%	16,085	3,588	76.58%

Parliament of Malaysia
Year	Constituency	Candidate	Votes	Pct	Opponent(s)	Votes	Pct	Ballots cast	Majority	Turnout
2008	P094 Hulu Selangor	Zainal Abidin Ahmad (PKR)	23,177	50.21%	Palanivel Govindasamy (MIC)	22,979	49.79%	47,845	198	75.24%

== Honours ==
- Selangor
  - Knight Commander of the Order of the Crown of Selangor (DPMS) – Dato' (1993)
  - Companion of the Order of the Crown of Selangor (SMS) (1991)
