= Hasanuddin Mohd Yunus =

Malaysian politician (born 1964)

Yang Berbahagia Datuk Hasanuddin Mohd Yunus PMW
- حسن الدين محمّد يونس

Chairman of Yayasan Dakwah Islamiah Malaysia
- In office 3 May 2023 – 2 May 2025
- Minister: Mohd Na'im Mokhtar
- Deputy: Adi Anuar Azmin @ Che Wan
- Preceded by: Nasrudin Hassan
- Succeeded by: Hasan Bahrom

Member of the Malaysian Parliament for Hulu Langat
- In office 9 May 2018 – 19 November 2022
- Preceded by: Che Rosli Che Mat (PAS)
- Succeeded by: Mohd Sany Hamzan (PH–AMANAH)
- Majority: 25,424 (2018)

Faction represented in Dewan Rakyat
- 2018–2022: Pakatan Harapan

Personal details
- Born: Hasanuddin bin Mohd Yunus; 5 December 1964 (age 61) Rengit, Johor, Malaysia
- Party: Malaysian Islamic Party (PAS) (1999–2015); National Trust Party (AMANAH) (since 2015)
- Other political affiliations: Barisan Alternatif (BA) (1999–2004); Pakatan Rakyat (PR) (2008–2015); Pakatan Harapan (PH) (since 2015)
- Spouse: Sharifah Mahiza Syed Abd Kadir
- Education: Kolej Islam Klang
- Alma mater: University of Jordan; University of Technology Malaysia
- Occupation: Politician
- Profession: Educator
- Website: Facebook

Hasanuddin bin Mohd Yunus (Jawi: حسن الدين بن محمد يونس; born 5 December 1964) is a Malaysian politician who has served as Chairman of the Yayasan Dakwah Islamiah Malaysia (YADIM) from May 2023 until May 2025. He served as the Member of Parliament (MP) for Hulu Langat from May 2018 to November 2022. He was also Member of the Board of Directors of the Global Conference of Parliamentarians Against Corruption (GOPAC) from December 2019 to December 2021 and Vice Chairman of the Southeast Asian Parliamentarians Against Corruption (SEAPAC). He is a member of the National Trust Party (AMANAH), a component party of the Pakatan Harapan (PH) coalition and previously a member of the Malaysian Islamic Party (PAS), then component party of the Barisan Alternatif (BA) and Pakatan Rakyat (PR) opposition coalitions. He was also the Vice President of AMANAH.

Hasanuddin had previously contested for the Johor State Legislative Assembly seat of Rengit in 1999, 2004 and 2008 general elections under the Malaysian Islamic Party's (PAS) ticket but lost all the contests to the then-ruling Barisan Nasional (BN) coalition. He did not participate in the 2013 general elections.

Hasanuddin eventually won the Hulu Langat parliamentary seat in Selangor as a candidate of AMANAH in the 2018 general elections. Hasanuddin did not participate in the 2022 general elections.

== Election results ==
Johor State Legislative Assembly
Year	Constituency	Candidate	Votes	Pct	Opponent(s)	Votes	Pct	Ballots cast	Majority	Turnout
1999	N22 Rengit	Hasanuddin Mohd Yunus (PAS)	5,816	33.04%	Zainal Abidin Mohd Zin (UMNO)	11,163	63.41%	17,604	5,347	71.58%
2004	N25 Rengit	Hasanuddin Mohd Yunus (PAS)	3,004	27.54%	Ayub Jamil (UMNO)	7,587	69.57%	10,906	4,583	70%
2008	N25 Rengit	Hasanuddin Mohd Yunus (PAS)	3,377	27.34%	Ayub Jamil (UMNO)	8,656	70.07%	12,354	5,279	78%

Parliament of Malaysia
Year	Constituency	Candidate	Votes	Pct	Opponent(s)	Votes	Pct	Ballots cast	Majority	Turnout
2018	P101 Hulu Langat	Hasanuddin Mohd Yunus (AMANAH)	49,004	55.53%	Azman Ahmad (UMNO)	23,580	26.72%	89,577	25,424	87.51%
2018	P101 Hulu Langat	Hasanuddin Mohd Yunus (AMANAH)	49,004	55.53%	Che Rosli Che Mat (PAS)	15,663	17.75%	89,577	25,424	87.51%

== Honours ==
- Federal Territory (Malaysia)
  - Commander of the Order of the Territorial Crown (PMW) – Datuk (2019)
