= Langat (federal constituency) =

Former federal constituency in Malaysia

Selangor constituency

Defunct federal constituency
- Legislature: Dewan Rakyat
- Constituency created: 1955
- Constituency abolished: 1974
- First contested: 1955
- Last contested: 1969

Langat was a federal constituency in Selangor, Malaysia, that was represented in the Dewan Rakyat from 1955 to 1974.

The federal constituency was created in the 1955 redistribution and was mandated to return a single member to the Dewan Rakyat under the first past the post voting system.

== History ==
It was abolished in 1974 when it was redistributed.

=== Representation history ===
Members of Parliament for Langat
Parliament	No	Years	Member	Party	Vote Share
Constituency created
Federal Legislative Council
1st		1955-1959	Abu Bakar Baginda (ابو بكر بڬيندا)	Alliance (UMNO)	7,069; 76.70%
Parliament of the Federation of Malaya
1st	P069	1959-1963	Zakaria Mohd Taib (زكريا محمد طائب)	Alliance (UMNO)	6,937; 57.42%
Parliament of Malaysia
1st	P069	1963-1964	Zakaria Mohd Taib (زكريا محمد طائب)	Alliance (UMNO)	6,937; 57.42%
2nd	P069	1964–1969	Zakaria Mohd Taib (زكريا محمد طائب)	Alliance (UMNO)	10,275; 70.69%
		1969-1971	Parliament was suspended		
3rd	P069	1971-1973	Shariff Ahmad (شريف احمد)	Alliance (UMNO)	8,433; 55.25%
3rd	P069	1973-1974	Shariff Ahmad (شريف احمد)	BN (UMNO)	8,433; 55.25%
Constituency abolished, renamed to Ulu Langat

=== State constituency ===
Parliamentary constituency	State constituency						
Parliamentary constituency	1955–59*	1959–1974	1974–1986	1986–1995	1995–2004	2004–2018	2018–present
Langat		Kajang					
Langat	Sepang						
Langat		Semenyih					
Langat	Ulu Langat						

=== Historical boundaries ===
State Constituency	State constituency
State Constituency	1959
Kajang	Dusun Tua; Hulu Langat; Kajang; Pangsun; Sungai Balak
Semenyih	Bangi; Beranang; Kampung Sungai Buah; Semenyih; Sungai Lalang

== Election results ==
Malaysian general election, 1969
Party	Candidate	Votes	%	∆%
Alliance	Shariff Ahmad	8,433	55.25	▼15.44
GERAKAN	Loh Chee Foom	6,829	44.75	▲44.75
Total valid votes		15,262	100.00	
Total rejected ballots		1,110		
Unreturned ballots		0		
Turnout		16,372	70.75	▼9.56
Registered electors		23,142		
Majority		1,604	10.50	▼30.88
Alliance hold		Swing		

Malaysian general election, 1964
Party	Candidate	Votes	%	∆%
Alliance	Zakaria Mohd Taib	10,275	70.69	▲13.27
Socialist Front	Ahmad Boestamam	4,260	29.31	▼13.27
Total valid votes		14,535	100.00	
Total rejected ballots		1,047		
Unreturned ballots		0		
Turnout		15,582	80.31	▲3.23
Registered electors		19,403		
Majority		6,015	41.38	▲26.54
Alliance hold		Swing		

Malayan general election, 1959
Party	Candidate	Votes	%	∆%
Alliance	Zakaria Mohd Taib	6,937	57.42	▼19.28
Socialist Front	Koh Pak Ngee	5,145	42.58	▲42.58
Total valid votes		12,082	100.00	
Total rejected ballots		166		
Unreturned ballots		0		
Turnout		12,248	77.08	▼9.92
Registered electors		15,890		
Majority		1,792	14.84	▼38.56
Alliance hold		Swing		

Malayan general election, 1955
Party	Candidate	Votes	%
Alliance	Abu Bakar Baginda	7,069	76.70
NEGARA	Mohd Nazir Abdul Jalil	2,147	23.30
Total valid votes		9,216	100.00
Total rejected ballots			
Unreturned ballots			
Turnout		9,216	87.00
Registered electors		10,593	
Majority		4,922	53.40
This was a new constituency created.
Source(s): The Straits Times.
