= Bakhtiar Mohd Nor =

Malaysian politician (1962–2019)

Member of the Selangor State Legislative Assembly for Semenyih
- In office 9 May 2018 – 11 January 2019
- Preceded by: Johan Abd Aziz (BN–UMNO)
- Succeeded by: Zakaria Hanafi (BN–UMNO)
- Constituency: 8,964 (2018)

Personal details
- Born: 15 November 1962
- Died: 11 January 2019 (aged 56) Hospital Kajang
- Party: Malaysian United Indigenous Party (BERSATU) (–2019)
- Other political affiliations: Pakatan Harapan (PH) (–2019)

Bakhtiar bin Mohd Nor (15 November 1962–11 January 2019) is a former Malaysian politician and a Member of the Selangor State Legislative Assembly for Semenyih from May 2018 to January 2019.

== Death ==
He died at Kajang Hospital on 11 January 2019 due to heart disease at 4.45 am. His remains were brought back to his family home in Semenyih and prayed immediately after Friday prayers at the Kampung Pasir Mosque, Semenyih and buried at the Kampung Pasir Cemetery.

== Election results ==
Selangor State Legislative Assembly
Year	Constituency	Candidate	Votes	Pct	Opponent(s)	Votes	Pct	Ballots cast	Majority	Turnout
2018	N24 Semenyih	Bakhtiar Mohd Nor (BERSATU)	23,428	50.76%	Johan Abd Aziz (UMNO)	14,464	31.34%	46,572	8,964	87.45%
2018	N24 Semenyih	Bakhtiar Mohd Nor (BERSATU)	23,428	50.76%	Mad Shahmiour Mat Kosim (PAS)	6,966	15.09%	46,572	8,964	87.45%
2018	N24 Semenyih	Bakhtiar Mohd Nor (BERSATU)	23,428	50.76%	Arutchelvan Subramaniams (PSM)	1,293	2.80%	46,572	8,964	87.45%
