= Zaidy Abdul Talib =

Malaysian politician

Mohd Zaidy Abdul Talib
- محمد زيدي عبدالطلب
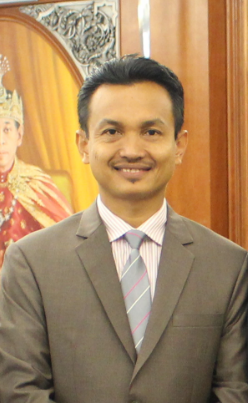

Member of the Selangor State Executive Council
- In office 26 September 2014 – 18 May 2018
- Monarch: Sharafuddin
- Menteri Besar: Azmin Ali
- Portfolio: Infrastructure, Public Facilities and Agro-based Industry
- Preceded by: Sallehen Mukhyi
- Succeeded by: Izham Hashim
- Constituency: Taman Templer

Member of the Selangor State Legislative Assembly for Taman Templer
- In office 5 May 2013 – 9 May 2018
- Preceded by: Subahan Kamal (BN–UMNO)
- Succeeded by: Mohd Sany Hamzan (PH–AMANAH)
- Majority: 7,467 (2013)

Personal details
- Born: 27 February 1972 (age 54) Pasir Mas, Kelantan, Malaysia
- Party: Malaysian Islamic Party (PAS)
- Other political affiliations: Pakatan Rakyat (PR); Gagasan Sejahtera (GS); Perikatan Nasional (PN)
- Spouse: Kasmawati Haron
- Children: 6
- Education: University of Malaya
- Occupation: Politician

Mohd Zaidy bin Abdul Talib is a Malaysian politician who served as Member of the Selangor State Executive Council (EXCO) in the Pakatan Rakyat (PR) and Pakatan Harapan (PH) state administrations under former Menteri Besar Azmin Ali from September 2014 to May 2018 as well as Member of the Selangor State Legislative Assembly (MLA) for Taman Templer from May 2013 to May 2018. He is a member of the Malaysian Islamic Party (PAS), a component party of the Perikatan Nasional (PN) and formerly PR coalitions.

== Election results ==
Selangor State Legislative Assembly
Year	Constituency	Candidate	Votes	Pct	Opponent(s)	Votes	Pct	Ballots cast	Majority	Turnout
2013	N15 Taman Templer	Zaidy Abdul Talib (PAS)	24,667	58.23%	Subahan Kamal (UMNO)	17,200	40.60%	43,142	7,467	87.39%
2013	N15 Taman Templer	Zaidy Abdul Talib (PAS)	24,667	58.23%	Roslan Basaruddin (IND)	495	1.17%	43,142	7,467	87.39%
2018	N15 Taman Templer	Zaidy Abdul Talib (PAS)	10,459	28.58%	Mohd Sany Hamzan (AMANAH)	18,362	50.14%	37,111	7,903	85.18%
2018	N15 Taman Templer	Zaidy Abdul Talib (PAS)	10,459	28.58%	Md Nasir Ibrahim (UMNO)	7,580	20.72%	37,111	7,903	85.18%
2018	N15 Taman Templer	Zaidy Abdul Talib (PAS)	10,459	28.58%	Rajandran Batumalai (PAP)	108	0.30%	37,111	7,903	85.18%
2018	N15 Taman Templer	Zaidy Abdul Talib (PAS)	10,459	28.58%	Koh Swe Yong (PRM)	82	0.22%	37,111	7,903	85.18%
2023	N15 Taman Templer	Zaidy Abdul Talib (PAS)	21,780	48.62%	Anfaal Saari (AMANAH)	22,247	49.67%	44,990	467	71.44%
2023	N15 Taman Templer	Zaidy Abdul Talib (PAS)	21,780	48.62%	Aida Rahman (MUDA)	765	1.71%	44,990	467	71.44%
