= Selayang Baharu (state constituency) =

Selangor constituency

Defunct state constituency
- Legislature: Selangor State Legislative Assembly
- Constituency created: 1994
- Constituency abolished: 2004
- First contested: 1995
- Last contested: 1999

Selayang Baharu was a state constituency in Selangor, Malaysia, that was represented in the Selangor State Legislative Assembly from 1995 to 2004.

The state constituency was created in the 1994 redistribution and was mandated to return a single member to the Selangor State Legislative Assembly under the first past the post voting system.

== History ==
It was abolished in 2004 when it was redistributed.

=== Representation history ===
Members of the Legislative Assembly for Selayang Baharu
Assembly	No	Years	Member	Party
Constituency created from Rawang
9th	N14	1995-1999	Ahmad Bhari Abd Rahman	BN (UMNO)
10th	N14	1999-2004	Ahmad Bhari Abd Rahman	BN (UMNO)
Constituency abolished, renamed to Taman Templer

== Election results ==
Selangor state election, 1999
Party	Candidate	Votes	%	∆%
BN	Ahmad Bhari Abd Rahman	12,629	56.35	▼28.31
PKR	Idrus Wan Chik	9,784	43.65	▲43.65
Total valid votes		22,413	100.00	
Total rejected ballots		453		
Unreturned ballots		61		
Turnout		22,927	74.64	▲5.10
Registered electors		22,927		
Majority		2,845	12.70	▼56.62
BN hold		Swing		

Selangor state election, 1995
Party	Candidate	Votes	%
BN	Ahmad Bhari Abd Rahman	16,049	84.66
PAS	Hasbolah Mohd Arif	2,909	15.34
Total valid votes		18,958	100.00
Total rejected ballots		441	
Unreturned ballots		97	
Turnout		19,496	69.54
Registered electors		28,037	
Majority		13,140	69.32
This was a new constituency created.
