= Dusun Tua (state constituency) =

Political division in Selangor, Malaysia

Dusun Tua (N23)
Selangor constituency

State constituency
- Legislature: Selangor State Legislative Assembly
MLA
Johan Abd Aziz
BN
- Constituency created: 1974
- First contested: 1974
- Last contested: 2023

Demographics
- Electors (2023): 74,419

Dusun Tua is a state constituency in Selangor, Malaysia, that has been represented in the Selangor State Legislative Assembly since 1974. It has been represented by Johan Abd Aziz of Barisan Nasional (BN) since 2023.

The state constituency was created in the 1974 redistribution and is mandated to return a single member to the Selangor State Legislative Assembly under the first past the post voting system.

== Demographics ==
Ethnic breakdown of Dusun Tua's electorate as of 2023
1. Malay (57.2%)
2. Chinese (28.4%)
3. Indian (7.47%)
4. Other ethnicities (6.92%)

== History ==
=== Polling districts ===
According to the gazette issued on 30 March 2018, the Dusun Tua constituency has a total of 18 polling districts.

State constituency	Polling districts	Code	Location
Dusun Tua（N23）	Pansun	101/23/01	SK Lubuk Kelubi
Dusun Tua（N23）	Lui	101/23/02	SK Sungai Lui
Dusun Tua（N23）	Kampung Jawa	101/23/03	SRA Batu 18 Hulu Langat
Dusun Tua（N23）	Pekan Lui	101/23/04	SJK (C) Choon Hwa Batu 18 Hulu Langat
Dusun Tua（N23）	Sungai Tekali	101/23/05	SK Sungai Tekali
Dusun Tua（N23）	Dusun Tua	101/23/06	SK Dusun Tua
Dusun Tua（N23）	Batu 14 Hulu Langat	101/23/07	SMK Abdul Jalil Hulu Langat
Dusun Tua（N23）	Sungai Serai	101/23/08	SK Sungai Serai
Dusun Tua（N23）	Batu 9 Cheras	101/23/09	SJK (C) Batu 9 Cheras
Dusun Tua（N23）	Kampung Sungai Raya	101/23/10	SRA Batu 9 Cheras
Dusun Tua（N23）	Taman Suntex	101/23/11	SK Batu Sembilan Cheras
Dusun Tua（N23）	Taman Cuepec	101/23/12	SK Taman Cuepec
Dusun Tua（N23）	Batu 13 Hulu Langat	101/23/13	SRA Pekan Hulu Langat
Dusun Tua（N23）	Sri Nanding	101/23/14	SRA Dusun Nanding Hulu Langat
Dusun Tua（N23）	Kampung Melaka	101/23/15	SK Bukit Raya
Dusun Tua（N23）	Taman Alam Jaya	101/23/16	SK Taman Puteri Cheras
Dusun Tua（N23）	Taman Kota Cheras	101/23/17	SRA Batu 10 Cheras
Dusun Tua（N23）	Batu 10 Cheras	101/23/18	Komplek Penghulu Mukim Cheras

=== Representation history ===
Members of the Legislative Assembly for Dusun Tua
Assembly	No	Years	Member	Party
Constituency created from Kajang
4th	N16	1974-1978	Mohamed Azmir Mohamed Nazir	BN (UMNO)
5th	N16	1978-1982	Mohamed Azmir Mohamed Nazir	BN (UMNO)
6th	N16	1982-1986	Mohamad Fahmi Ibrahim	BN (UMNO)
7th	N22	1986-1987	Mohamed Azmir Mohamed Nazir	BN (UMNO)
7th	N22	1987-1990	Mohamed Azmir Mohamed Nazir	IND
8th	N22	1990-1995	Zainal Abidin Ahmad	BN (UMNO)
9th	N22	1995-1999	Zainal Abidin Ahmad	BN (UMNO)
10th	N22	1999-2004	Zainal Abidin Ahmad	BN (UMNO)
11th	N23	2004-2008	Rahmad Musa	BN (UMNO)
12th	N23	2008-2013	Ismail Sani	BN (UMNO)
13th	N23	2013-2015	Razaly Hassan	PR (PAS)
13th	N23	2015-2016	Razaly Hassan	PAS
13th	N23	2016-2018	Razaly Hassan	GS (PAS)
14th	N23	2018-2023	Edry Faizal	PH (DAP)
15th	N23	2023–present	Johan Abd Aziz	BN (UMNO)

== Election results ==
Selangor state election, 2023
Party	Candidate	Votes	%	∆%
BN	Johan Abd Aziz	26,755	49.91	▲21.57
PN	Azhar Hambali	23,741	44.29	▲44.29
MUDA	Al Hafiz Ikhwan	3,110	5.76	▲5.76
Total valid votes		53,606	100.00	
Total rejected ballots		306		
Unreturned ballots		76		
Turnout		53,988	72.55	▼13.98
Registered electors		74,319		
Majority		3,014	5.58	▼9.11
BN gain from PKR		Swing		?

Selangor state election, 2018
Party	Candidate	Votes	%	∆%
PKR	Edry Faizal	22,325	53.16	▲53.16
BN	Mohd Zin Isa	11,903	28.34	▼16.60
PAS	Razaly Hassan	7,771	18.50	▼36.56
Total valid votes		41,999	100.00	
Total rejected ballots		490		
Unreturned ballots		0		
Turnout		41,999	86.53	▼2.21
Registered electors		49,106		
Majority		10,422	24.81	▲14.69
PKR gain from PAS		Swing		?
Source(s) "Election Commission of Malaysia". 10 May 2018. Archived from the original on 9 May 2018.

Selangor state election, 2013
Party	Candidate	Votes	%	∆%
PAS	Razaly Hassan	22,161	55.06	▲8.97
BN	Ismail Sani	18,090	44.94	▼8.97
Total valid votes		40,251	100.00	
Total rejected ballots		438		
Unreturned ballots		163		
Turnout		40,852	88.74	▲9.42
Registered electors		46,038		
Majority		4,071	10.12	▲2.31
PAS gain from BN		Swing		?
Source(s) "Federal Government Gazette - Notice of Contested Election, State Legislative Assembly for the State of Selangor [P.U. (B) 192/2013]" (PDF). Attorney General's Chambers of Malaysia. 26 April 2013. Archived from the original (PDF) on 2019-12-29. "Federal Government Gazette - Results of Contested Election and Statements of the Poll after the Official Addition of Votes, State Constituencies for the State of Selangor [P.U. (B) 233/2013]" (PDF). Attorney General's Chambers of Malaysia. 22 May 2013. Archived from the original (PDF) on 2018-10-02.

Selangor state election, 2008
Party	Candidate	Votes	%	∆%
BN	Ismail Sani	13,542	53.91	▼17.99
PAS	Mohd Sany Hamzan	11,579	46.09	▲46.09
Total valid votes		25,121	100.00	
Total rejected ballots		459		
Unreturned ballots		0		
Turnout		25,580	79.32	▲2.97
Registered electors		32,248		
Majority		1,963	7.81	▼35.99
BN hold		Swing		

Selangor state election, 2004
Party	Candidate	Votes	%	∆%
BN	Rahmad Musa	14,845	71.90	▲10.29
PKR	Abdul Ghani Haroon	5,802	28.10	▲28.10
Total valid votes		20,647	100.00	
Total rejected ballots		344		
Unreturned ballots		386		
Turnout		21,377	76.35	▼0.23
Registered electors		27,997		
Majority		9,043	43.80	▲21.50
BN hold		Swing		

Selangor state election, 1999
Party	Candidate	Votes	%	∆%
BN	Zainal Abidin Ahmad	9,518	61.61	▼26.46
PAS	Md. Fadzil Hassan	5,930	38.39	▲38.39
Total valid votes		15,448	100.00	
Total rejected ballots		369		
Unreturned ballots		268		
Turnout		16,085	76.58	▲3.31
Registered electors		21,004		
Majority		3,588	22.30	▼50.97
BN hold		Swing		

Selangor state election, 1995
Party	Candidate	Votes	%	∆%
BN	Zainal Abidin Ahmad	12,437	88.07	▲12.89
S46	Mohd Arbawi Mohd Anuar	1,685	11.93	▼12.89
Total valid votes		14,122	100.00	
Total rejected ballots		445		
Unreturned ballots		455		
Turnout		15,022	73.27	▼4.74
Registered electors		20,501		
Majority		10,752	76.14	▲15.79
BN hold		Swing		

Selangor state election, 1990
Party	Candidate	Votes	%	∆%
BN	Zainal Abidin Ahmad	11,153	75.18	▲11.94
S46	Mohd Arbawi Mohd Anuar	3,683	24.82	▲24.82
Total valid votes		14,836	100.00	
Total rejected ballots		779		
Unreturned ballots		0		
Turnout		15,615	78.01	▲10.05
Registered electors		20,017		
Majority		7,470	50.35	▲13.71
BN hold		Swing		

Selangor state election, 1986
Party	Candidate	Votes	%	∆%
BN	Mohd Azmir Mohd Nazir	7,082	63.24	▼10.92
NASMA	Khairuddin Suleiman	2,979	26.60	▲26.60
PAS	Amat Sulaiman	1,138	10.16	▲4.76
Total valid votes		11,199	100.00	
Total rejected ballots		445		
Unreturned ballots		0		
Turnout		11,644	67.96	▼3.85
Registered electors		17,133		
Majority		4,103	36.64	▼17.08
BN hold		Swing		

Selangor state election, 1982
Party	Candidate	Votes	%	∆%
BN	Mohamad Fahmi Ibrahim	7,033	74.16	▲3.06
DAP	Ng Teck Lian	1,807	19.05	▲19.05
PAS	Zainal Abidin Karim	451	4.76	▼7.41
Independent	Mohamed Sahar Mohamed Jali	193	2.04	▲2.04
Total valid votes		9,484	100.00	
Total rejected ballots		244		
Unreturned ballots		0		
Turnout		9,728	71.81	▲4.29
Registered electors		13,547		
Majority		5,226	53.72	▼0.76
BN hold		Swing		

Selangor state election, 1978
Party	Candidate	Votes	%	∆%
BN	Mohd Azmir Mohd Nazir	5,450	71.10	▼4.92
PEKEMAS	Mohamed Sahar Mohamed Jali	1,282	16.73	▲2.72
PAS	Misran Ahmad	933	12.17	▲12.17
Total valid votes		7,665	100.00	
Total rejected ballots		543		
Unreturned ballots		0		
Turnout		8,208	73.24	▲3.22
Registered electors		11,207		
Majority		4,168	54.38	▼7.62
BN hold		Swing		

Selangor state election, 1974
Party	Candidate	Votes	%	∆%
BN	Mohd Azmir Mohd Nazir	4,079	76.02	
PEKEMAS	Mohamed Sahar Mohamed Jali	752	14.01	
DAP	Mohamed Samah Arshad	535	9.97	
Total valid votes		5,366	100.00	
Total rejected ballots		327		
Unreturned ballots		0		
Turnout		5,693	70.02	
Registered electors		8,130		
Majority		3,229	60.18	
This was a new constituency created.
