= Social Security Organisation (Malaysia) =

Malaysian government agency

- Pertubuhan Keselamatan Sosial ڤرتوبوهن کسلامتن سوسيال
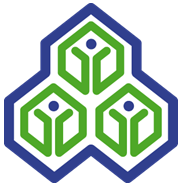

Agency overview
- Formed: 1 October 1971; 54 years ago
- Jurisdiction: Government of Malaysia
- Headquarters: Menara PERKESO, 281, Jalan Ampang, 50538, Kuala Lumpur
- Minister responsible: Ramanan Ramakrishnan, Minister of Human Resources
- Agency executives: Subahan Kamal, Chairman; Mohammed Azman Aziz Mohammed, Chief Executive Officer
- Parent agency: Ministry of Human Resources
- Key document: Employees' Social Security Act 1969
- Website: www.perkeso.gov.my

The Social Security Organisation (Malay: Pertubuhan Keselamatan Sosial; Jawi: ڤرتوبوهن کسلامتن سوسيال; (officially abbreviated as PERKESO) is a Malaysian government agency and a statutory body under the Ministry of Human Resources. Established in 1971, it entrusted to administer and implement social security schemes under the Employees' Social Security Act 1969, Self-Employment Social Security Act 2017, Employment Insurance System Act 2017 and Housewives' Social Security Act 2022. Apart from that, the organization also provides social security protection to employees and their dependents.

== History ==
The origins of PERKESO dates back in 1958, when a social security study was conducted by experts from the International Labour Organization (ILO). In 1962, a high-level committee was formed to review the results of this study. The results of the study report became the basis for the Social Security Act which was passed by Parliament in 1969 with the aim of providing social security protection to workers and their dependents.

PERKESO was established as a government department under the Ministry of Human Resources on 1 October 1971 to enforce, administer and implement social security schemes under the Employees' Social Security Act 1969. It became a statutory body effective 1 July 1985. On 1 January 1992, PERKESO was separated from the Government's New Remuneration System and introduced its own remuneration system, and at the same time, its commuting accident protection scheme came into effect. On 21 February, the Employees' Social Security Act (Amendment) 1991 began to enforced.

In 1995, PERKESO spent RM15 million to develop imaging technology to reduce paper usage in its daily operations. By the end of 2000, PERKESO set up its anti-fraud division to curb false claims cases by contributors involving its staff and panel doctors.

== See also ==
- Employees' Social Security Act 1969
- Employees Provident Fund (Malaysia)
