= Taman Templer (state constituency) =

State constituency in Selangor, Malaysia

Taman Templer (N15)
Selangor constituency

State constituency
- Legislature: Selangor State Legislative Assembly
MLA
Anfaal Saari
PH
- Constituency created: 2003
- First contested: 2004
- Last contested: 2023

Demographics
- Electors (2023): 62,978

Taman Templer is a state constituency in Selangor, Malaysia, that has been represented in the Selangor State Legislative Assembly since 2004. It has been represented by Member of the State Executive Council (EXCO) Anfaal Saari since 2023.

The state constituency was created in the 2003 redistribution and is mandated to return a single member to the Selangor State Legislative Assembly under the first past the post voting system.

== Demographics ==
Ethnic breakdown of Taman Templer's electorate as of 2023
1. Malay (59.0%)
2. Chinese (22.1%)
3. Indian (14.6%)
4. Other ethnicities (4.30%)

== History ==
=== Polling districts ===
According to the federal gazette issued on 30 March 2018, the Taman Templer constituency is divided into 16 polling districts.

State constituency	Polling Districts	Code	Location
Taman Templer（N15）	Batu 16 Rawang	097/15/01	SMK Rawang Semekar
Taman Templer（N15）	Bandar Baru Selayang Utara	097/15/02	SK Bandar Baru Selayang
Taman Templer（N15）	Bukit Idaman	097/15/03	SMK Ideal Heights
Taman Templer（N15）	Selayang Baharu Tiga	097/15/04	SK Selayang Baru (1)
Taman Templer（N15）	Selayang Baharu Dua	097/15/05	SK Selayang Baru Dua
Taman Templer（N15）	Selayang Baharu Satu	097/15/06	SJK (C) Selayang Baru
Taman Templer（N15）	Taman Selayang Baharu	097/15/07	SRA Selayang Baru
Taman Templer（N15）	Selayang Pandang	097/15/08	SA Rakyat Umm Quarra' Selayang Pandang
Taman Templer（N15）	Sri Melati	097/15/09	SK Taman Prima Selayang
Taman Templer（N15）	Bandar Baru Selayang Selatan	097/15/10	SK Bandar Baru Selayang 2
Taman Templer（N15）	Kampung Bendahara	097/15/11	Dewan Seroja Kampung Bendahara Selayang
Taman Templer（N15）	Lembah Mutiara	097/15/12	Dewan Sri Siantan Kompleks Sukan Seri Siantan Majlis Perbandaran Selayang
Taman Templer（N15）	Kampung Selayang Permai	097/15/13	Dewan Masyarakat Kampung Selayang Permai
Taman Templer（N15）	Kampung Selayang Indah	097/15/14	Dewan Orang Ramai JKKK Kampung Selayang Indah
Taman Templer（N15）	Taman Selayang Indah	097/15/15	SA Rakyat Al-Falah
Taman Templer（N15）	Prima Selayang	097/15/16	SK Taman Prima Selayang

=== Representation history ===
Members of the Legislative Assembly for Taman Templer
Assembly	No	Years	Member	Party
Constituency created from Selayang Baharu, Paya Jaras and Sungai Tua
11th	N15	2004–2008	Ahmad Bhari Abd Rahman	BN (UMNO)
12th	N15	2008–2013	Subahan Kamal	BN (UMNO)
13th	N15	2013–2018	Zaidy Abdul Talib	PR (PAS)
14th	N15	2018–2023	Mohd Sany Hamzan	PH (AMANAH)
15th	N15	2023–present	Anfaal Saari	PH (AMANAH)

== Election results ==
Selangor state election, 2023
Party	Candidate	Votes	%	∆%
PH	Anfaal Saari	22,247	49.67	▼0.51
PN	Zaidy Abdul Talib	21,780	48.62	▲48.62
MUDA	Aida Nazeera Abd Rahman	765	1.71	▲1.71
Total valid votes		44,792	100.00	
Total rejected ballots		198		
Unreturned ballots		53		
Turnout		45,043	71.52	▼13.66
Registered electors		62,978		
Majority		467	1.05	▼20.55
PH hold		Swing		

Selangor state election, 2018
Party	Candidate	Votes	%	∆%
PKR	Mohd Sany Hamzan	18,362	50.18	▲50.18
PAS	Zaidy Abdul Talib	10,459	28.58	▼29.65
BN	Md Nasir Ibrahim	7,580	20.72	▼19.88
People's Alternative Party	Rajandran Batumalai	108	0.30	▲0.30
Parti Rakyat Malaysia	Koh Swe Yong	82	0.22	▲0.22
Total valid votes		36,591	100.00	
Total rejected ballots		325		
Unreturned ballots		195		
Turnout		37,111	85.18	▼2.21
Registered electors		43,570		
Majority		7,903	21.60	▲3.97
PKR gain from PAS		Swing		?

Selangor state election, 2013
Party	Candidate	Votes	%	∆%
PAS	Zaidy Abdul Talib	24,667	58.23	▲9.30
BN	Subahan Kamal	17,200	40.60	▼10.47
Independent	Roslan Basaruddin	495	1.17	▲1.17
Total valid votes		42,362	100.00	
Total rejected ballots		666		
Unreturned ballots		114		
Turnout		43,142	87.39	▲11.63
Registered electors		49,368		
Majority		7,467	17.63	▲15.49
PAS gain from BN		Swing		?
Source(s) "Federal Government Gazette - Notice of Contested Election, State Legislative Assembly for the State of Selangor [P.U. (B) 192/2013]" (PDF). Attorney General's Chambers of Malaysia. 26 April 2013. Archived from the original (PDF) on 2019-12-29. "Federal Government Gazette - Results of Contested Election and Statements of the Poll after the Official Addition of Votes, State Constituencies for the State of Selangor [P.U. (B) 233/2013]". Attorney General's Chambers of Malaysia. 22 May 2013. Archived from the original (PDF) on 2018-10-02.

Selangor state election, 2008
Party	Candidate	Votes	%	∆%
BN	Subahan Kamal	14,600	51.07	▼13.91
PAS	Mohamad Abdul Rahman	13,987	48.93	▲13.91
Total valid votes		28,587	100.00	
Total rejected ballots		583		
Unreturned ballots		115		
Turnout		29,285	75.76	▲1.20
Registered electors		38,655		
Majority		613	2.14	▼27.82
BN hold		Swing		

Selangor state election, 2004
Party	Candidate	Votes	%
BN	Ahmad Bhari Abd Rahman	16,536	64.98
PAS	Mohd Hatta Md. Ramli	8,911	35.02
Total valid votes		25,447	100.00
Total rejected ballots		422	
Unreturned ballots		547	
Turnout		26,416	74.56
Registered electors		35,431	
Majority		7,625	29.96
This was a new constituency created.
