= Subahan Kamal =

Malaysian Businessman

Yang Berbahagia Dato' Sri Subahan Kamal SSAP DSPN DIMP
- صبحان کمال
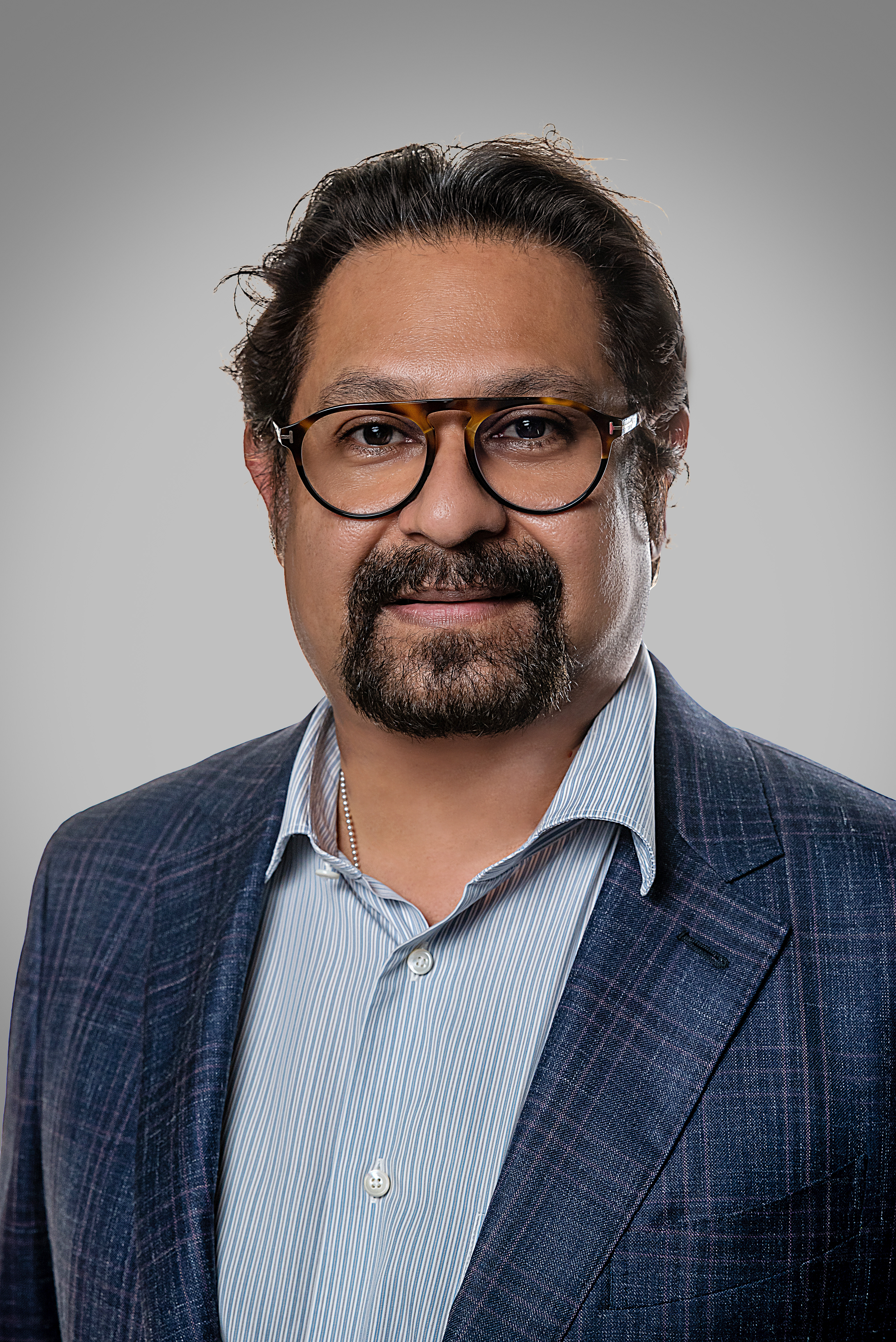

President of Malaysian Hockey Confederation
- Incumbent
- Assumed office 13 May 2015
- Preceded by: Tengku Abdullah Sultan Ahmad Shah

President of the Football Association of Selangor
- In office 23 February 2017 – 3 July 2018
- Preceded by: Mohamed Azmin Ali
- Succeeded by: Tengku Amir Shah

Deputy President of Football Association of Malaysia
- In office 2017–2021

Chairman of the Social Security Organisation
- Incumbent
- Assumed office 4 October 2022
- Preceded by: Mohamed Haniffa Abdullah

Faction represented in Selangor State Legislative Assembly
- 2008–2013: Barisan Nasional

Personal details
- Born: Subahan bin Kamal; 26 December 1965 (age 60) Selayang, Selangor, Malaysia
- Occupation: Businessman and sports executive

Subahan bin Kamal (Jawi: صبحان بن كمال; born 26 December 1965) is a Malaysian businessman and former politician. He has held numerous board and senior management roles at Malaysian-based companies. Subahan is a director at two Bursa Malaysia-listed companies. He is chairman at Can-One Berhad, and is non-executive chairman at Alcom Group. He is an executive director of ACE Market-listed Gagasan Nadi Cergas Berhad. Subahan is executive chairman of FBE Ventures, an F&B company based in Kuala Lumpur, Malaysia. He was a member of the United Malays National Organisation (UMNO) party.

As a sports executive, Subahan is president of the Malaysian Hockey Confederation. He began as deputy chairman of Selangor Hockey Association in 2009, becoming chairman in 2011, he was Malaysian Hockey Confederation chairman, holding both roles until 2017. He was president of the Football Association of Selangor until July 2018. He was the deputy chairman of the Malaysian FA between 2017 and 2021.

== Career ==
=== Early career ===
Subahan worked at Bank Rakyat from 1989 until 1994 where he joined the corporate planning department. In 1994, he started working as the private secretary to the parliamentary secretary of Ministry of Finance until 1995. He then became the senior private secretary to the Deputy Finance Minister from 1995 to 1998, serving Affifudin Omar, Wong See Wah and Mohamed Nazri Abdul Aziz respectively. Subahan became senior private secretary to the Deputy Human Resource Minister, Afifudin Omar in 1999. In later part of 1999, he left the civil sector to start his business in construction, however, his relationships with various government agencies and departments remain strong and relevant till today.

=== Sports executive and roles ===
Subahan's roles in sport began in 2009, when he was invited to join the Selangor Hockey Association and was voted in as Deputy Chairman. He remained in the role for two years before he was voted in as Chairman. While in the position, Subahan re-introduced the Selangor Hockey League (SHL) and focused on a new regional tournament. Stadia was also improved in the region.

In 2015, he became the President of the Malaysian Hockey Confederation after winning an unchallenged race for the position. In 2017, it was announced that Subahan would become President of the Football Association of Selangor. Around the same time, Subahan also became the Deputy Chairman at the Football Association of Malaysia. He held the role at Selangor FA for a year before announcing the would be leaving the role due to other commitments, with the FAM and MHC.

He is also the President of Petaling Jaya City FC. In 2021, he announced that he would not be seeking reelection as Deputy at Football Association of Malaysia.

=== Other roles ===
Subahan also served as the Chairman of the Social Security Organisation (SOCSO), a position he held since 4 October 2022.

== Election results ==
Selangor State Legislative Assembly
Year	Constituency	Candidate	Votes	Pct	Opponent(s)	Votes	Pct	Ballots cast	Majority	Turnout
2008	N15 Taman Templer	Subahan Kamal (UMNO)	14,600	51.07%	Mohamad Abdul Rahman (PAS)	13,987	48.93%	29,285	613	75.76%
2013	N15 Taman Templer	Subahan Kamal (UMNO)	17,200	40.60%	Zaidy Abdul Talib (PAS)	24,667	58.23%	43,142	7,467	87.39%
2013	N15 Taman Templer	Subahan Kamal (UMNO)	17,200	40.60%	Roslan Basaruddin (IND)	495	1.17%	43,142	7,467	87.39%

== Honours ==
- Pahang
  - Knight Grand Companion of the Order of Sultan Ahmad Shah of Pahang (SSAP) – Dato' Sri (2011)
  - Knight Companion of the Order of the Crown of Pahang (DIMP) – Dato'
- Penang
  - Officer of the Order of the Defender of State (DSPN) – Dato' (2022)
