= Nushi Mahfodz =

Malaysian politician, preacher and lecturer

Yang Berhormat Tuan Nushi Mahfodz MLA
- نوشي محفوظ

State Information Chief of the Malaysian Islamic Party of Selangor
- Incumbent
- Assumed office 3 April 2023
- President: Abdul Hadi Awang
- State commissioner: Ahmad Yunus Hairi (3 April–31 October 2023); Ab Halim Tamuri (since 2023)
- Preceded by: Mohd Fadli Ghani

Member of the Selangor State Legislative Assembly for Semenyih
- Incumbent
- Assumed office 12 August 2023
- Preceded by: Zakaria Hanafi (BN–UMNO)
- Majority: 1,262 (2023)

Personal details
- Born: Nushi bin Mahfodz; 27 December 1975 (age 50) Glasgow, Scotland, United Kingdom
- Citizenship: Malaysian
- Party: Malaysian Islamic Party (PAS)
- Other political affiliations: Gagasan Sejahtera (GS) (2016–2020); Perikatan Nasional (PN) (since 2020)
- Relations: Mahfodz Mohamed (father); Ahmad Nawfal Mahfodz (younger brother)
- Education: Yarmouk University (Bachelor of Arts (BA) (Honours) in Syariah); Al al-Bayt University (Master of Arts (MA) in Syariah)
- Occupation: Politician; preacher; lecturer

Nushi bin Mahfodz (born 27 December 1975) is a British-born Malaysian politician, preacher and lecturer who has served as Member of the Selangor State Legislative Assembly (MLA) for Semenyih since August 2023.

== Career ==
Upon his return from Jordan in 2001, he worked as a lecturer at the Ahmad Ibrahim Law School, International Islamic University of Malaysia from 2001 to 2011 for a decade. He has since served as a lecturer at the Faculty of Syariah and Law, Selangor International Islamic University College since 2011 and deputy director of the KUISCELL Sendirian Berhad (Sdn Bhd) since 2014. In the meantime, he was also a syariah advisor at several banks. He was appointed a syariah advisor at Asian Finance Bank based in Qatar from 2014 to 2017. When Asian Finance Bank was taken over and renamed MBSB Bank, his service as a sharia advisor continued until 2018.

== Political career ==
=== Member of the Selangor State Legislative Assembly (since 2023) ===
==== 2023 Selangor state election ====
In the 2023 Selangor state election, Mahfodz was nominated by PN to contest the Semenyih state seat. Nushi won the seat and was elected to the Selangor State Legislative Assembly as the Semenyih MLA for the first term after narrowly defeating Wan Zulaika Anua from UMNO of Barisan Nasional (BN) by a majority of only 1,262 votes.

== Election results ==
Selangor State Legislative Assembly
| Year | Constituency | Candidate | Votes | Pct | Opponent(s) | Votes | Pct | Ballots cast | Majority | Turnout |
|---|---|---|---|---|---|---|---|---|---|---|
| 2018 | N26 Sungai Ramal | Nushi Mahfodz (PAS) | 13,961 | 29.13% | Mazwan Johar (AMANAH) | 24,591 | 51.31% | 48,366 | 10,630 | 88.00% |
| 2018 | N26 Sungai Ramal | Nushi Mahfodz (PAS) | 13,961 | 29.13% | Abdul Rahim Mohd Amin (UMNO) | 9,372 | 19.56% | 48,366 | 10,630 | 88.00% |
| 2023 | N24 Semenyih | Nushi Mahfodz (PAS) | 37,068 | 50.87% | Wan Zulaika Anua (UMNO) | 35,806 | 49.13% | 72,874 | 1,262 | 74.90% |
