= Employees' Social Security Act 1969 =

Parliament of Malaysia
- Long title: An Act to provide social security in certain contingencies and to make provision for certain other matters in relation to it.
- Citation: Act 4
- Territorial extent: Throughout Malaysia
- Passed by: Dewan Rakyat
- Passed: 12 February 1969
- Passed by: Dewan Negara
- Passed: 26 February 1969
- Royal assent: 2 April 1969
- Commenced: 10 April 1969
- Effective: See Appendix of this Act

Legislative history

First chamber: Dewan Rakyat
- Bill title: Employees' Social Security Bill 1969
- Introduced by: V. Manickavasagam, Minister of Labour
- First reading: 10 January 1969
- Second reading: 11 February 1969
- Third reading: 12 February 1969

Second chamber: Dewan Negara
- Bill title: Employees' Social Security Bill 1969
- Member(s) in charge: Abdul Ghafar Baba, Minister without Portfolio
- First reading: 24 February 1969
- Second reading: 26 February 1969
- Third reading: 26 February 1969

Amended by
- Employees’ Social Security (Amendment) Act 1979 [Act A450] Employees’ Social Security (Amendment) Act 1980 [Act A499] Employees’ Social Security (Amendment) Act 1984 [Act A590] Employees’ Social Security (Amendment) Act 1987 [Act A675] Employees’ Social Security (Amendment) Act 1992 [Act A814] Revocation of Exemption From Payment of Stamp Duty Act 1992 [Act 478] Employees’ Social Security (Amendment) (No. 2) Act 1992 [Act A830] Employees’ Social Security (Amendment) Act 1997 [Act A981] Employees’ Social Security (Amendment) Act 2004 [Act A1232] Employees’ Social Security (Amendment of Fifth Schedule) Order 2008 [P. U. (A) 32/2008] Employees’ Social Security (Amendment) Act 2012 [Act A1445] Employees’ Social Security (Amendment) Act 2016 [Act A1508]

Keywords
- Employee, social security
- Status: In force

The Employees' Social Security Act 1969 (Malay: Akta Keselamatan Sosial Pekerja 1969), is a Malaysian laws which enacted to provide social security in certain contingencies and to make provision for certain other matters in relation to it. The law is enforced by the Social Security Organisation (PERKESO or SOCSO).

== Structure ==
The Employees' Social Security Act 1969, in its current form (26 May 2016), consists of 7 Parts containing 112 sections and 10 schedules (including 12 amendments).

- Part I: Preliminary
- Part II: Insurability and Contributions
- Part III: Benefits
- Part IV: Administration, Finance and Audit
- Part V: Adjudication of Dispute and Claims
- Part VI: Penalties
- Part VII: Miscellaneous
- Schedules
