= Semenyih (state constituency) =

State constituency in Selangor, Malaysia

Semenyih (N24)
Selangor constituency

State constituency
- Legislature: Selangor State Legislative Assembly
MLA
Nushi Mahfodz
PN
- Constituency created: 1958
- First contested: 1959
- Last contested: 2023

Demographics
- Electors (2023): 97,300

Semenyih is a state constituency in Selangor, Malaysia, that has been represented in the Selangor State Legislative Assembly since 1959. It has been represented by Nushi Mahfodz of Perikatan Nasional (PN) since August 2023.

The state constituency was created in the 1958 redistribution and is mandated to return a single member to the Selangor State Legislative Assembly under the first past the post voting system.

== Demographics ==
Ethnic breakdown of Semenyih's electorate as of 2023
1. Malay (69.0%)
2. Chinese (14.8%)
3. Indian (12.9%)
4. Other ethnicities (3.32%)

== History ==
It was abolished in 1995 when it was redistributed. It was re-created in 2003.

=== Polling districts ===
According to the gazette issued on 30 March 2018, the Semenyih constituency has a total of 23 polling districts.

| State constituency | Polling districts | Code | Location |
|---|---|---|---|
| Semenyih（N24） | Semenyih Barat | 101/24/01 | SK Semenyih |
| Semenyih（N24） | Hulu Semenyih | 101/24/02 | SK Ulu Semenyih |
| Semenyih（N24） | Tarun | 101/24/03 | Pejabat Jawatankuasa Kemajuan Dan Keselamatan Kampung (JKKK) Kampung Baru Tarun/Broga |
| Semenyih（N24） | Kampung Tanjong | 101/24/04 | Balai Raya Kampung Tanjung |
| Semenyih（N24） | Kampung Baharu Semenyih | 101/24/05 | SJK (C) Kampung Baru Semenyih |
| Semenyih（N24） | Pekan Semenyih | 101/24/06 | SJK (C) Sin Ming Semenyih |
| Semenyih（N24） | Semenyih Selatan | 101/24/07 | SRA Batu Tiga Jalan Bangi |
| Semenyih（N24） | Kampung Rinching | 101/24/08 | SK Kampung Rinching |
| Semenyih（N24） | Bandar Rinching Seksyen 1-4 | 101/24/09 | SK Bandar Rinching |
| Semenyih（N24） | Sesapan Kelubi | 101/24/10 | Pejabat Jawatankuasa Kemajuan Dan Keselamatan Kampung (JKKK) Kampunh Sesapan Kelubi |
| Semenyih（N24） | Sesapan Batu | 101/24/11 | SRA Sasapan Batu Minangkabau |
| Semenyih（N24） | Sungai Jai | 101/24/12 | Balai Raya Kampung Sungai Jai |
| Semenyih（N24） | Beranang | 101/24/13 | SK Beranang |
| Semenyih（N24） | Kuala Pajam | 101/24/14 | SK Kampung Kuala Pajam |
| Semenyih（N24） | Sungai Kembung | 101/24/15 | SK Rinching Hilir |
| Semenyih（N24） | Sesapan Batu Rembau | 101/24/16 | Balai Raya Sesapan Batu Rembau |
| Semenyih（N24） | Kampung Batu 26 Beranang | 101/24/17 | Balai Raya Taman Pkns Batu 26 Beranang |
| Semenyih（N24） | Penjara Kajang | 101/24/18 | Kafa Integrasi Hidayatul Iman |
| Semenyih（N24） | Semenyih Indah | 101/24/19 | SMK Engku Husain |
| Semenyih（N24） | Bandar Rinching Seksyen 5-6 | 101/24/20 | SMK Bandar Rinching |
| Semenyih（N24） | Bandar Tasik Kesuma | 101/24/21 | SMK Bandar Tasik Kesuma |
| Semenyih（N24） | Kantan Permai | 101/24/22 | SK Kantan Permai |
| Semenyih（N24） | Bukit Mahkota | 101/24/23 | SMK Bandar Seri Putra |

=== Representation history ===
Members of the Legislative Assembly for Semenyih
| Assembly | No | Years | Member | Party |
Constituency created
| 1st | N10 | 1959-1964 | Kampo Radjo | Alliance (UMNO) |
| 2nd | N10 | 1964-1969 | Zainuddin Mohd Sidin | Alliance (UMNO) |
| | | 1969-1971 | Assembly dissolved | |
| 3rd | N10 | 1971-1973 | Salmah Mohd. Salleh | Alliance (UMNO) |
| 3rd | N10 | 1973-1974 | Salmah Mohd. Salleh | BN (UMNO) |
| 4th | N17 | 1974-1978 | Salmah Mohd. Salleh | BN (UMNO) |
| 5th | N17 | 1978-1982 | Abdul Hamid Mohamed Said | BN (UMNO) |
| 6th | N17 | 1982-1986 | Marwilis Yusof | BN (UMNO) |
| 7th | N23 | 1986-1990 | Abdul Jalil Mohd. Nazir | BN (UMNO) |
| 8th | N23 | 1990-1995 | Shoib Md. Silin | BN (UMNO) |
Constituency abolished, split into Beranang and Kajang
Constituency re-created from Beranang
| 11th | N24 | 2004-2008 | Ahmad Kuris Mohd Nor | BN (UMNO) |
| 12th | N24 | 2008-2013 | Johan Abd Aziz | BN (UMNO) |
| 13th | N24 | 2013-2018 | Johan Abd Aziz | BN (UMNO) |
| 14th | N24 | 2018-2019 | Bakhtiar Mohd Nor | PH (BERSATU) |
| 14th | N24 | 2019–2023 | Zakaria Hanafi | BN (UMNO) |
| 15th | N24 | 2023–present | Nushi Mahfodz | PN (PAS) |

== Election results ==
Selangor state election, 2023
| Party | Candidate | Votes | % | ∆% |
|---|---|---|---|---|
| PN | Nushi Mahfodz | 37,068 | 50.87 | ▲50.87 |
| BN | Wan Zulaika Anua | 35,806 | 49.13 | ▼1.31 |
| Total valid votes | | 72,874 | 100.00 | |
| Total rejected ballots | | 460 | | |
| Unreturned ballots | | 92 | | |
| Turnout | | 73,426 | 75.46 | ▲2.16 |
| Registered electors | | 97,300 | | |
| Majority | | 1,262 | 1.74 | ▼3.22 |
| PN gain from BN | | Swing | | ? |

Selangor state by-election, March 2, 2019 Upon the death of incumbent, Bakhtiar Mohd Nor
| Party | Candidate | Votes | % | ∆% |
|---|---|---|---|---|
| BN | Zakaria Hanafi | 19,780 | 50.44 | ▲19.10 |
| PH | Muhammad Aiman Zainali | 17,866 | 45.58 | ▼5.18 |
| Parti Sosialis Malaysia | Nik Aziz Afiq Abdul | 847 | 2.16 | ▼0.60 |
| Independent | Kuan Chee Heng | 725 | 1.82 | ▲1.82 |
| Total valid votes | | 38,518 | 100.00 | |
| Total rejected ballots | | 650 | | |
| Unreturned ballots | | 50 | | |
| Turnout | | 39,218 | 73.30 | ▼14.15 |
| Registered electors | | 54,503 | | |
| Majority | | 1,914 | 4.96 | ▼14.46 |
| BN gain from PH | | Swing | | . |

Selangor state election, 2018
| Party | Candidate | Votes | % | ∆% |
|---|---|---|---|---|
| PKR | Bakhtiar Mohd Nor | 23,428 | 50.76 | ▲14.84 |
| BN | Johan Abd Aziz | 14,464 | 31.34 | ▼17.55 |
| PAS | Mad Shahmiour Mat Kosim | 6,966 | 15.09 | ▲15.09 |
| Parti Sosialis Malaysia | Arutchelvan Subramaniams | 1,293 | 2.80 | ▼12.39 |
| Total valid votes | | 46,151 | 100.00 | |
| Total rejected ballots | | 366 | | |
| Unreturned ballots | | 55 | | |
| Turnout | | 46,572 | 87.45 | ▼1.28 |
| Registered electors | | 53,257 | | |
| Majority | | 8,964 | 19.42 | ▲6.45 |
| PKR gain from BN | | Swing | | . |

Selangor state election, 2013
| Party | Candidate | Votes | % | ∆% |
|---|---|---|---|---|
| BN | Johan Abd Aziz | 17,922 | 48.89 | ▼3.70 |
| PKR | Hamidi A. Hasan | 13,165 | 35.92 | ▼11.49 |
| Parti Sosialis Malaysia | Arutchelvan Subramaniams | 5,568 | 15.19 | ▲15.19 |
| Total valid votes | | 36,655 | 100.00 | |
| Total rejected ballots | | 701 | | |
| Unreturned ballots | | 216 | | |
| Turnout | | 37,572 | 88.73 | ▲7.43 |
| Registered electors | | 42,344 | | |
| Majority | | 4,757 | 12.97 | ▲7.79 |
| BN hold | | Swing | | |
Source(s) "Federal Government Gazette - Notice of Contested Election, State Legislative Assembly for the State of Selangor [P.U. (B) 192/2013]" (PDF). Attorney General's Chambers of Malaysia. 26 April 2013. Archived from the original (PDF) on 2019-12-29. "Federal Government Gazette - Results of Contested Election and Statements of the Poll after the Official Addition of Votes, State Constituencies for the State of Selangor [P.U. (B) 233/2013]". Attorney General's Chambers of Malaysia. 22 May 2013. Archived from the original (PDF) on 2018-10-02.

Selangor state election, 2008
| Party | Candidate | Votes | % | ∆% |
|---|---|---|---|---|
| BN | Johan Abd Aziz | 11,588 | 52.59 | ▼18.41 |
| PKR | Arutchelvan Subramaniams | 10,448 | 47.41 | ▲47.41 |
| Total valid votes | | 22,036 | 100.00 | |
| Total rejected ballots | | 544 | | |
| Unreturned ballots | | 348 | | |
| Turnout | | 22,928 | 81.30 | ▲5.13 |
| Registered electors | | 28,203 | | |
| Majority | | 1,140 | 5.18 | ▼36.82 |
| BN hold | | Swing | | |

Selangor state election, 2004
| Party | Candidate | Votes | % | ∆% |
|---|---|---|---|---|
| BN | Ahmad Kuris Mohd Nor | 13,280 | 71.00 | |
| PAS | Mohd Khairuddin Othman | 5,425 | 29.00 | |
| Total valid votes | | 14,868 | 100.00 | |
| Total rejected ballots | | 369 | | |
| Unreturned ballots | | 3 | | |
| Turnout | | 15,240 | 74.03 | ▲2.03 |
| Registered electors | | 20,585 | | |
| Majority | | 2,652 | 17.84 | ▼46.58 |
| BN hold | | Swing | | |

Selangor state election, 1990
| Party | Candidate | Votes | % | ∆% |
|---|---|---|---|---|
| BN | Shoib Md. Silin | 10,645 | 66.40 | ▲6.83 |
| S46 | Kamaruzzaman Jamal | 5,386 | 33.60 | ▲33.60 |
| Total valid votes | | 16,031 | 100.00 | |
| Total rejected ballots | | 556 | | |
| Unreturned ballots | | 123 | | |
| Turnout | | 16,710 | 75.73 | ▲6.15 |
| Registered electors | | 22,065 | | |
| Majority | | 5,259 | 32.81 | ▲7.27 |
| BN hold | | Swing | | |

Selangor state election, 1986
| Party | Candidate | Votes | % | ∆% |
|---|---|---|---|---|
| BN | Abdul Jalal Mohd. Nazir | 7,340 | 59.57 | ▼9.08 |
| DAP | Abdul Karim Busu | 4,194 | 34.04 | ▲3.05 |
| PAS | Abd Kadir Ismail | 788 | 6.40 | ▲6.40 |
| Total valid votes | | 12,322 | 100.00 | |
| Total rejected ballots | | 341 | | |
| Unreturned ballots | | 0 | | |
| Turnout | | 12,663 | 69.58 | ▼6.53 |
| Registered electors | | 18,199 | | |
| Majority | | 3,146 | 25.53 | ▼1.77 |
| BN hold | | Swing | | |

Selangor state election, 1982
| Party | Candidate | Votes | % | ∆% |
|---|---|---|---|---|
| BN | Marwilis Yusof | 6,761 | 68.65 | ▲13.80 |
| DAP | Lam Man Yoon | 3,087 | 31.35 | ▲31.35 |
| Total valid votes | | 9,848 | 100.00 | |
| Total rejected ballots | | 307 | | |
| Unreturned ballots | | 0 | | |
| Turnout | | 10,155 | 76.11 | |
| Registered electors | | 13,342 | | |
| Majority | | 3,674 | 37.30 | ▲7.09 |
| BN hold | | Swing | | |

Selangor state election, 1978
| Party | Candidate | Votes | % | ∆% |
|---|---|---|---|---|
| BN | Abdul Hamid Mohamed Said | 4,390 | 54.85 | ▲6.20 |
| PEKEMAS | Kamarulzaman Ibrahim | 1,972 | 24.64 | ▲20.72 |
| Independent | Amran Umar | 1,009 | 12.61 | ▲12.61 |
| PAS | Hassan Soud | 479 | 5.99 | ▲5.99 |
| Independent | Mokhtar Hitam | 153 | 1.91 | ▲1.91 |
| Total valid votes | | 8,003 | 100.00 | |
| Total rejected ballots | | 458 | | |
| Unreturned ballots | | 0 | | |
| Turnout | | 8,461 | 78.44 | ▼3.88 |
| Registered electors | | 10,787 | | |
| Majority | | 2,418 | 30.21 | ▼3.51 |
| BN hold | | Swing | | |

Selangor state election, 1974
| Party | Candidate | Votes | % | ∆% |
|---|---|---|---|---|
| BN | Salmah Mohd. Salleh | 3,957 | 61.05 | ▲7.04 |
| Independent | Chong Teck Lai | 1,771 | 27.32 | ▲27.32 |
| Independent | Mosdaram Othman | 370 | 5.71 | ▲5.71 |
| PEKEMAS | Abdul Kassim Busu | 254 | 3.92 | ▲3.92 |
| DAP | Aziz Mohamed Sarip | 130 | 2.01 | ▲2.01 |
| Total valid votes | | 6,482 | 100.00 | |
| Total rejected ballots | | 384 | | |
| Unreturned ballots | | 0 | | |
| Turnout | | 6,866 | 82.32 | ▲6.58 |
| Registered electors | | 8,341 | | |
| Majority | | 2,186 | 33.72 | ▲25.70 |
| BN gain from Alliance Party (Malaysia) Party (Malaysia) | | Swing | | ? |

Selangor state election, 1969
| Party | Candidate | Votes | % | ∆% |
|---|---|---|---|---|
| Alliance | Salmah Mohd. Salleh | 3,102 | 54.01 | ▼15.42 |
| GERAKAN | Tang Kun Kek | 2,641 | 45.99 | ▲45.99 |
| Total valid votes | | 5,743 | 100.00 | |
| Total rejected ballots | | 552 | | |
| Unreturned ballots | | 0 | | |
| Turnout | | 6,295 | 75.73 | ▼6.00 |
| Registered electors | | 8,312 | | |
| Majority | | 461 | 8.03 | ▼30.82 |
| Alliance hold | | Swing | | |

Selangor state election, 1964
| Party | Candidate | Votes | % | ∆% |
|---|---|---|---|---|
| Alliance | Zainuddin Mohamed Sidin | 4,110 | 69.43 | ▼3.54 |
| Socialist Front | Mohamed Samah Arshad | 1,810 | 30.57 | ▲30.57 |
| Total valid votes | | 5,920 | 100.00 | |
| Total rejected ballots | | 512 | | |
| Unreturned ballots | | 0 | | |
| Turnout | | 6,432 | 81.74 | ▲20.80 |
| Registered electors | | 7,869 | | |
| Majority | | 2,300 | 38.86 | ▼18.65 |
| Alliance hold | | Swing | | |

Selangor state election, 1959
| Party | Candidate | Votes | % |
|---|---|---|---|
| Alliance | Kampo Radjo | 3,734 | 72.97 |
| National Party | Dagang Silin | 791 | 15.46 |
| PMIP | Yunus Yatim | 592 | 11.57 |
| Total valid votes | | 5,117 | 100.00 |
| Total rejected ballots | | 295 | |
| Unreturned ballots | | 0 | |
| Turnout | | 5,412 | 60.94 |
| Registered electors | | 8,881 | |
| Majority | | 2,943 | 57.51 |
This was a new constituency created.
