= Socialist Party of Malaysia =

- Malay name: Parti Sosialis Malaysia ڤرتي سوسياليس مليسيا
- Chinese name: 馬來西亞社會主義黨 马来西亚社会主义党; Mǎláixīyà Shèhuì Zhǔyì Dǎng
- Tamil name: மலேசிய சோசியலிஸ்ட் கட்சி Malēciya Cōciyalisṭ Kaṭci
- Abbreviation: PSM
- Chairman: Michael Jeyakumar Devaraj
- Founded: 30 April 1998
- Legalised: 19 August 2008
- Split from: Parti Rakyat Malaysia
- Headquarters: 140, Jalan Sultan Abdul Samad, Brickfields, 50470 Kuala Lumpur
- Newspaper: Sosialis; Think Left; Socialist Perspectives (yearly)
- Youth wing: Pemuda Sosialis (Socialist Youth)
- Ideology: Socialism; Democratic socialism Left-wing populism Progressivism
- Political position: Left-wing
- National affiliation: Electoral pact Blok Progresif (since 2023)
- International affiliation: Progressive International
- Colours: Maroon
- Slogan: Bersama Membina Kuasa Rakyat (Together Building People's Power); Dinamik, Berani, Berprinsip (Dynamic, Courageous, Principled)
- Anthem: Internasionale
- Dewan Negara: 0 / 70
- Dewan Rakyat: 0 / 222
- Dewan Undangan Negeri: 0 / 607

Party flag

Website
- partisosialis.org

The Socialist Party of Malaysia (PSM, Malay: Parti Sosialis Malaysia; Chinese: 马来西亚社会主义党; Tamil: மலேசிய சோசியலிஸ்ட் கட்சி), is a socialist political party in Malaysia.

Formed in 1998, the party was denied registration as a political party until 2008 on the grounds that it was a threat to national security. Shortly after, it achieved its electoral breakthrough when it won its first parliamentary and state seats in Sungai Siput and Kota Damansara respectively. PSM has played an important role in Malaysia’s social struggles.

== History ==
=== Formation ===
The party origin can be traced back to activists and grassroots organisations working with plantation communities and urban settlers. In 1991, several grassroots based organisations working with the urban and rural poor in Malaysia formed an alliance. These included the Suara Warga Pertiwi (SWP) led by Mohd Nasir Hashim, Alaigal led by Dr Michael Jeyakumar Devaraj, and Community Development Centre (CDC) led by Arutchelvan Subramaniam.

In 1994, the groups staged a massive Labour Day demonstration at the heart of Kuala Lumpur, surprising many people. The last major demonstration called by the working class in the capital city was in the 1970s.

In 1995, these grassroots organisation who already had their strong support among the plantation workers, the urban poor, and industrial workers mooted the idea for a political party to represent the aspirations of the poor and the marginalised. The election results in 1995 gave a sweeping win to the ruling Barisan Nasional and hastened this process.

After years of discussion and consolidations, it was finally agreed that a party with socialist ideology was needed to liberate the masses from their current conditions. With this in mind, the groups took more than two and the half years to draft the party's constitution, which was ready by the end of 1997. After further consultation with their electoral base, on 1 May 1998, the new party known as the Socialist Party of Malaysia officially submitted its application for registration. Former PSRM central committee member and ex-ISA detainee Mohd Nasir Hashim was named pro-tem party chairman during this time.

=== Legal issues ===
The Malaysian government rejected PSM's application to register as a political party, alleging that it represented a threat to national security. The party sued the government in response, bringing the matter to the High Court, Court of Appeal, and the Federal Court.

While the Court of Appeal rejected the government's argument that PSM represented a threat to national security, it upheld the High Court's ruling against PSM. The Malaysian government approved PSM's application on 17 June 2008, just before Federal Court proceedings started, ending a 10-year legal battle. Its registration was approved on 19 August 2008.

The party's symbol, a clenched fist, was initially rejected by the Electoral Commission when it sought registration with the body, with the argument that it contained "connotations of violence" and was "morally unsuitable". It was later approved.

=== 1999–2018 ===
==== 1999 and 2008 general elections ====
In 1999, the party decided to contest in that year's general election. Since PSM was not registered, it had to contest using another party's logo. In 1999, it contested under a Democratic Action Party (DAP) ticket in Sungai Siput. The main intention was to popularise the party.

PSM candidates fielded for the 2004 general election.

Following the 1999 election, PSM opened its service centre in Sungai Siput. This reportedly caused friction with DAP, and seat negotiations ahead of the 2004 general election broke down. The party instead entered into an agreement with Parti Keadilan Nasional (KeADILan) to use its symbol to contest the federal seats of Sungai Siput and Subang, and the state seats of Jalong and Bukit Lanjan in that election.

The party achieved its electoral breakthrough in the 2008 general election. Three of its candidates ran using the symbol of People's Justice Party (PKR), which succeeded KeADILan, while another ran as an independent. Michael Jeyakumar Devaraj won PSM's first ever federal parliamentary seat in Sungai Siput, defeating Samy Vellu, president of the Malaysian Indian Congress (MIC), who had represented the constituency for 34 years. PSM chairman Mohd Nasir Hashim won the Kota Damansara seat in the Selangor state legislative assembly. Arutchelvan and Sarasvathy Muthu unsuccessfully contested the seats of Semenyih and Jelapang, the latter as an independent.

==== 2013 general election ====
Ahead of the 2013 general election, the party applied to join the Pakatan Rakyat (PR) opposition coalition, consisting of the DAP, PKR, and Malaysian Islamic Party (PAS), though the application was ultimately unsuccessful.

Having been legalised, the party could now contest using its own symbol and name. However, it clashed with Pakatan over seat allocations and the use of the PSM symbol for its candidates.

PKR agreed to allocate PSM the seats of Sungai Siput and Kota Damansara, on the condition that the party contested them using the PKR symbol, or else face both Pakatan and Barisan Nasional (BN) candidates in a three-cornered fight. PSM also sought to recontest the seats of Semenyih and Jelapang, the latter considered a stronghold of the DAP.

An agreement was ultimately reached for PSM to contest Sungai Siput and Kota Damansara using the PKR symbol. The party was successful in retaining Sungai Siput, but lost in Kota Damansara, Semenyih, and Jelapang, where it faced both BN and Pakatan candidates. Relations between the party and Pakatan deteriorated following the election.

==== 2018 general election ====
For the 2018 general election, PSM contested in five federal constituencies and 14 state constituencies using only its own symbol and name.

While Pakatan Harapan (PH), founded to succeed Pakatan Rakyat in 2015, indicated a willingness to step aside in Sungai Siput if the party contested using the PKR symbol, PSM opted to contest the election independently. Due in part to this decision, PSM suffered a heavy defeat with all its candidates losing their deposits. Nevertheless, the party urged voters to vote for Pakatan in seats it was not contesting.

=== Since 2019 ===
Nasir Hashim and M Sarasvathy stood down as the party's chairman and deputy chairman in 2019. Michael Jeyakumar and Arutchelvan were elected as their replacements.

In the 2022 general election, PSM failed to reached an understanding with Pakatan Harapan and ran only a single candidate in Rembau. The party had initially sought to have its chairman, Michael Jeyakumar re-contest Sungai Siput, or be allowed to contest three seats in which the coalition had no incumbency.

On 15 July 2023, PSM and the Malaysian United Democratic Alliance (MUDA) announced a political alliance for the 2023 state elections. The elections were held in Selangor, Kelantan, Terengganu, Negeri Sembilan, Kedah and Penang on 12 August 2023, and the PSM/MUDA alliance attempted to position itself as the "third choice" for voters "who are unhappy and bored with the politicians now and want to protest."

In July 2024, the party held its 26th annual congress, at which Sivaranjani Manickam was elected secretary-general replacing A Sivarajan.

== Leadership ==
- Chairman
  - Dr Michael Jeyakumar Devaraj
- Deputy Chairman
  - S. Arutchelvan
- Secretary-General
  - Sivaranjani Manickam
- Deputy Secretary-General
  - Gandipan Nantha Gopalan
- Treasurer
  - S. Madhavi
- Assistant Treasurer
  - Bawani KS
- Central Executive Committee members
  - Amir Syafiq Ameer Soekre
  - Arveent Kathirtchelvan
  - Chong Yee Shan
  - Choo Chon Kai
  - Nik Aziz Afiq
  - R. Saratbabu Raman
  - Soo Sook Hwa
  - A. Sivarajan
  - Tinagaran Subramaniam
- PSM Youth Chief
  - Amanda Shweeta Louis

Over the years, the party's three main front organisations established more than a hundred sub-fronts, and it still believes in grassroots work done with the masses especially the plantation workers, the urban poor, industrial workers, peasants and also collaborates with the progressive student movement.

PSM was also at the forefront of the successful battle to establish a minimum wage in Malaysia.

Aside from electoral contests and grassroots campaigns, PSM is also known for organising its annual Labour Day march and international socialism conferences held every November.

=== Seven-Point Manifesto ===
PSM has a seven-point manifesto which lists the following policies:

1. Workers' rights will be safeguarded (e.g. minimum wage, automatic recognition of workers unions and 90-day maternal leave).
2. The eradication of neo-liberal policies (e.g. halting privatisation of health care, education and other public necessities).
3. Stopping the Free Trade Agreement with western imperial powers.
4. Provide comfortable and humane housing for both rural and urban inhabitants.
5. Stopping racial and religious politics to foster greater unity among the people.
6. Eradication of corruption and abuse of power.
7. Stopping the destruction of the environment.

== General election results ==
Election	Total seats won	Seats contested	Total votes	Voting Percentage	Outcome of election	Election leader
1999	0 / 193	25			; No representation in Parliament	Mohd Nasir Hashim
2004	0 / 219	33			; No representation in Parliament	Mohd Nasir Hashim
2008	1 / 222	11	16,458		▲1 seat; Opposition coalition (PR)	Mohd Nasir Hashim
2013	1 / 222	9	21,593		; Opposition coalition (PR)	Mohd Nasir Hashim
2018	0 / 222	5	3,782	0.03%	▼1 seat; No representation in Parliament	Mohd Nasir Hashim
2022	0 / 222	1	779	0.01%	; No representation in Parliament (allied with PRM)	Michael Jeyakumar Devaraj

== State election results ==
State assembly	Election	Votes	%	Seats	Won/contested	+/–	Position (Note: As part of electoral coalition.)	Status
Perlis	2022	Did not contest						No seats
Kedah	2023	Did not contest						No seats
Kelantan	2023	Did not contest						No seats
Terengganu	2023	Did not contest						No seats
Penang	2023	Did not contest						No seats
Perak	2022	586	0.0	0 / 59	0 / 1	Steady	▼7th	No seats
Pahang	2022	Did not contest						No seats
Selangor	2023	6,257	0.2	0 / 56	0 / 4	Steady	▼5th	No seats
Negeri Sembilan	2026	400	0.1	0 / 36	0 / 1	Steady	6th (Blok Progresif)	No seats
Malacca	2026	Did not contest						No seats
Johor	2026	964	0.1	0 / 56	0 / 1	Steady	▲5th (Blok Progresif)	No seats
Sabah	2025	Did not contest						No seats
Sarawak	2021	Did not contest						No seats

Note

State election	State Legislative Assembly							
State election	Kelantan	Penang	Perak	Pahang	Selangor	Negeri Sembilan	Johor	Total won / Total contested
2/3 majority	2 / 3	2 / 3	2 / 3	2 / 3	2 / 3			2 / 3
2004			0 / 59		0 / 56			0 / 2
2008			0 / 59		1 / 56			1 / 3
2013			0 / 59		0 / 56			0 / 3
2018	0 / 45	0 / 40	0 / 59	0 / 42	0 / 56			0 / 12
2022							0 / 56	0 / 1
2022			0 / 59					0 / 1
2023					0 / 56			0 / 4
2026						0 / 36	0 / 56	0 / 2

== See also ==
- Category:Socialist Party of Malaysia politicians
- List of political parties in Malaysia
- Politics of Malaysia
