= Members of the Dewan Rakyat, 5th Malaysian Parliament =

5th Parliament of Malaysia
←	4th Parliament	6th Parliament	→

Overview
- Legislative body: Parliament of Malaysia
- Jurisdiction: Malaysia
- Meeting place: Malaysian Houses of Parliament
- Term: 31 July 1978 – 29 March 1982
- Election: 1978 general election
- Government: Second Hussein cabinet (until 16 July 1981); First Mahathir cabinet
- Website: www.parlimen.gov.my

Dewan Rakyat
- Members: 154
- Speaker: Syed Nasir Ismail
- Deputy Speaker: Mansor Othman
- Secretary: Azizul Rahman Abdul Aziz
- Prime Minister: Hussein Onn (until 16 July 1981); Mahathir Mohamad
- Leader of the Opposition: Lim Kit Siang
- Party control: Barisan Nasional

Sovereign
- Yang di-Pertuan Agong: Tuanku Yahya Petra (until 29 March 1979); Tuanku Ahmad Shah

Sessions
- 1st: 31 July 1978 – 11 December 1979
- 2nd: 17 March 1980 – 12 December 1980
- 3rd: 16 March 1981 – 21 December 1981
- 4th: 8 March 1982 – 19 March 1982

This is a list of the members of the Dewan Rakyat (House of Representatives) of the 5th Parliament of Malaysia, elected in 1978.

== Composition ==
State	# of Seats	UMNO Seats	MCA Seats	MIC Seats	PAS Seats	Gerakan Seats	PPP Seats	DAP Seats	PSRM Seats	BERJAYA Seats	USNO Seats	PBB Seats	SNAP Seats	SUPP Seats	SAPO Seats	IND Seats
Perlis	2	2														
Kedah	13	9	2		2											
Kelantan	12	10			2											
Trengganu	7	7														
Penang	9	2	1		1	1		4								
Perak	21	10	3	1		2		4								1
Pahang	8	6	2													
Selangor	11	6	3	1				1								
Federal Territory of Kuala Lumpur	5	1				1		3								
Negri Sembilan	6	3	1	1				1								
Malacca	4	2	1					1								
Johore	16	11	4					1								
Sabah	16							1		9	5					1
Sarawak	24											8	9	6	1	
Seats won	154	70	17	3	5	4	0	16	0	9	5	8	9	6	1	1
Seats contested	370	74	27	4	89	6	1	53	0	0	0	0	0	0	1	50

== Elected members by state ==
Shortcut:

Perlis | Kedah | Kelantan | Terengganu | Pulau Pinang | Perak | Pahang | Selangor | Kuala Lumpur | Negeri Sembilan | Melaka | Johor | Sabah | Sarawak

Unless noted otherwise, the MPs served the entire term of the parliament (from 31 July 1978 until 29 March 1982).

=== Perlis ===
No.	Federal Constituency	Member	Party
BN 2
P001	Kangar	Shaari Jusoh	BN (UMNO)
P002	Arau	Syed Hassan Syed Mohamed	BN (UMNO)

=== Kedah ===
No.	Federal Constituency	Member	Party
BN 11 | PAS 2
P003	Jerlun-Langkawi	Sanusi Junid	BN (UMNO)
P004	Kubang Pasu	Mahathir Mohamad	BN (UMNO)
P005	Padang Terap	Syed Ahmad Syed Mahmud Shahabuddin	BN (UMNO)
P006	Kuala Kedah	Senu Abdul Rahman	BN (UMNO)
P007	Alor Setar	Oo Gin Sun	BN (MCA)
P008	Kota Setar	Abu Bakar Umar	PAS
P009	Ulu Muda	Hashim Endut	BN (UMNO)
P010	Baling	Mohd. Nakhaie Ahmad	PAS
P011	Jerai	Ismail Arshad	BN (UMNO)
P012	Kuala Muda	Khir Johari	BN (UMNO)
P013	Sungei Patani	Wan Zainab M. A. Bakar	BN (UMNO)
P014	Padang Serai	Lim Kiam Hoon	BN (MCA)
P015	Kulim-Bandar Bahru	Abdul Kadir Sheikh Fadzir	BN (UMNO)

=== Kelantan ===
No.	Federal Constituency	Member	Party
BN 10 | PAS 2
P016	Tumpat	Tengku Noor Asiah Tengku Ahmad	BN (UMNO)
P017	Pengkalan Chepa	Nik Abdul Aziz Nik Mat	PAS
P018	Pasir Mas	Abdul Rahman Daud	BN (UMNO)
P019	Kota Bharu	Tengku Ahmad Rithauddeen Tengku Ismail	BN (UMNO)
P020	Bachok	Mohd. Zain Abdullah	PAS
P021	Rantau Panjang	Ibrahim Muhammad	BN (UMNO)
P022	Nilam Puri	Mohamed Ali	BN (UMNO)
P023	Tanah Merah	Hussein Mahmood	BN (UMNO)
P024	Machang	Mohd. Kassim Ahmed	BN (UMNO)
P025	Pasir Puteh	Wan Mohd. Najib Wan Mohamad	BN (UMNO)
P026	Kuala Krai	Nik Hussein Wan Abdul Rahman	BN (UMNO)
P027	Ulu Kelantan	Tengku Razaleigh Hamzah	BN (UMNO)

=== Trengganu ===
No.	Federal Constituency	Member	Party
BN 7
P028	Besut	Zakaria Abdul Rahman	BN (UMNO)
P029	Ulu Nerus	Abdullah Abdul Rahman	BN (UMNO)
P030	Ulu Trengganu	Alias Md. Ali	BN (UMNO)
P031	Kuala Nerus	Nik Hassan Abdul Rahman	BN (UMNO)
P032	Kuala Trengganu	Abdul Manan Othman	BN (UMNO)
P033	Dungun	Awang Abdul Jabar	BN (UMNO)
P034	Kemaman	Ismail Said	BN (UMNO)

=== Penang ===
No.	Federal Constituency	Member	Party
BN 4 | DAP 4 | PAS 1
P035	Kepala Batas	Abdullah Ahmad Badawi	BN (UMNO)
P036	Mata Kuching	Ling Liong Sik	BN (MCA)
P037	Permatang Pauh	Zabidi Ali	PAS
P038	Bukit Mertajam	Seow Hun Khim	DAP
P039	Nibong Tebal	Goh Cheng Teik	BN (Gerakan)
P040	Balik Pulau	Shamsuri Md. Salleh	BN (UMNO)
P041	Bukit Bendera	Peter Paul Dason	DAP
P042	Tanjong	Wong Hoong Keat	DAP
P043	Jelutong	Karpal Singh	DAP

=== Perak ===
No.	Federal Constituency	Member	Party
BN 17 | DAP 4
P044	Gerik	Tajol Rosli Mohd Ghazali	BN (UMNO)
P045	Larut	Kamaruddin Mohamed Isa	BN (UMNO)
P046	Parit Buntar	Idris Abdul Rauf	BN (UMNO)
P047	Bagan Serai	Ramli Omar	BN (UMNO)
P048	Sungei Siput	Samy Vellu	BN (MIC)
P049	Taiping	Paul Leong Khee Seong	BN (Gerakan)
P050	Matang	Hashim Ghazali	BN (UMNO)
P051	Padang Rengas	Umar Ismail	BN (UMNO)
P052	Kuala Kangsar	Yong Fatimah Mohd. Razali	BN (UMNO)
P053	Kinta	Yang Choong Fu	BN (MCA)
P054	Ipoh	Lim Cho Hock	DAP
P055	Menglembu	P. Patto	DAP
P056	Bruas	Ting Chek Ming	DAP
P057	Parit	Mohd. Bakri Abdul Rais	BN (UMNO)
P058	Batu Gajah	Chian Heng Kai	DAP
P059	Batang Padang	Azharul Abidin Abdul Rahim	BN (UMNO)
P060	Lumut	Richard Ho Ung Hun	BN (MCA)
P061	Hilir Perak	Kamaluddin Maamor	BN (UMNO)
P062	Telok Anson	Au How Cheong	BN (Gerakan)
P063	Tanjong Malim	Mak Hon Kam	BN (MCA)
P064	Bagan Datok	Hassan Adli Arshad	BN (UMNO)

=== Pahang ===
No.	Federal Constituency	Member	Party
BN 8
P065	Lipis	Ghazali Shafie	BN (UMNO)
P066	Jerantut	Shariff Ahmad	BN (UMNO)
P067	Kuantan	Mohd Ali M. Shariff	BN (UMNO)
P068	Raub	Tan Koon Swan	BN (MCA)
P069	Maran	Hishamuddin Yahaya	BN (UMNO)
P070	Bentong	Chan Siang Sun	BN (MCA)
P071	Pekan	Najib Razak	BN (UMNO)
P072	Temerloh	Hamzah Abu Samah	BN (UMNO)

=== Selangor ===
No.	Federal Constituency	Member	Party
BN 10 | DAP 1
P073	Sabak Bernam	Jamaluddin Suhaimi	BN (UMNO)
P074	Tanjong Karang	Abdul Shukur Siraj	BN (UMNO)
P075	Ulu Selangor	Michael Chen Wing Sum	BN (MCA)
P075	Ulu Selangor	Michael Chen Wing Sum	BN (Gerakan)
P076	Kuala Selangor	Abu Hassan Omar	BN (UMNO)
P077	Selayang	Rafidah Aziz	BN (UMNO)
P078	Ulu Langat	Rosemary Chow Poh Kheng	BN (MCA)
P079	Pelabuhan Kelang	V. Govindaraj from 1 December 1979 (Note: Govindaraj was elected to Parliament in the Pelabuhan Kelang by-election, 1978 after the death of V. Manickavasagam.)	BN (MIC)
P079	Pelabuhan Kelang	V. Manickavasagam until 12 October 1979	BN (MIC)
P080	Shah Alam	Lew Sip Hon	BN (MCA)
P081	Petaling	Lim Kit Siang	DAP
P082	Kuala Langat	Aishah Ghani	BN (UMNO)
P083	Sepang	Suhaimi Kamaruddin	BN (UMNO)

=== Federal Territory of Kuala Lumpur ===
No.	Federal Constituency	Member	Party
DAP 3 | BN 2
P084	Kepong	Tan Tiong Hong	BN (Gerakan)
P085	Setapak	Mohd. Idris Ibrahim	BN (UMNO)
P086	Damansara	V. David	DAP
P087	Kuala Lumpur Bandar	Lee Lam Thye	DAP
P088	Sungei Besi	Chan Kok Kit	DAP

=== Negri Sembilan ===
No.	Federal Constituency	Member	Party
BN 5 | DAP 1
P089	Jelebu	Abdul Samad Idris	BN (UMNO)
P090	Mantin	Lee Boon Peng	BN (MCA)
P091	Seremban	Chen Man Hin	DAP
P092	Kuala Pilah	Mansor Othman (Deputy Speaker)	BN (UMNO)
P093	Telok Kemang	K. Pathmanaban	BN (MIC)
P094	Tampin	Mokhtar Hashim	BN (UMNO)

=== Malacca ===
No.	Federal Constituency	Member	Party
BN 3 | DAP 1
P095	Alor Gajah	Abdul Rahim Thamby Chik	BN (UMNO)
P096	Jasin	Ghafar Baba	BN (UMNO)
P097	Batu Berendam	Chong Hon Nyan	BN (MCA)
P098	Kota Melaka	Chan Teck Chan	DAP

=== Johore ===
No.	Federal Constituency	Member	Party
BN 15 | DAP 1
P099	Labis	Musa Hitam	BN (UMNO)
P100	Segamat	Lee San Choon	BN (MCA)
P101	Kluang	Lee Kaw	DAP
P102	Tenggaroh	Abdul Kadir Yusuf	BN (UMNO)
P103	Ledang	Embong Yahya	BN (UMNO)
P104	Pagoh	Muhyiddin Yassin	BN (UMNO)
P105	Ayer Hitam	Hee Tien Lai	BN (MCA)
P106	Muar	Neo Yee Pan	BN (MCA)
P107	Renggam	Chin Hon Ngian	BN (MCA)
P108	Panti	Yusof Malim Kuning	BN (UMNO)
P109	Sri Gading	Mustaffa Mohammad from 26 September 1981	BN (UMNO)
P109	Sri Gading	Hussein Onn until 11 August 1981	BN (UMNO)
P110	Semerah	Shariffah Dorah Syed Mohammed	BN (UMNO)
P111	Batu Pahat	Abdul Jalal Abu Bakar	BN (UMNO)
P112	Pontian	Ikhwan Nasir	BN (UMNO)
P113	Pulai	Mohamed Rahmat	BN (UMNO)
P114	Johore Bahru	Shahrir Abdul Samad	BN (UMNO)

=== Sabah ===
No.	Federal Constituency	Member	Party
BN 15 | DAP 1
P115	Marudu	Ashkar Hasbollah	BN (USNO)
P116	Bandau	George Abah Mengimbal	BN (BERJAYA)
P117	Kota Belud	Mohamed Said Keruak	BN (USNO)
P118	Labuk-Sugut	Ampong Puyon	BN (USNO)
P119	Tuaran	James Peter Ongkili	BN (BERJAYA)
P120	Kinabalu	Mark Koding	IND
P121	Gaya	William Lye Chee Hien	BN (BERJAYA)
P122	Penampang	Clarence E. Mansul	BN (BERJAYA)
P123	Sandakan	Fung Ket Wing	DAP
P124	Kinabatangan	Abdul Ghani Misbah	BN (BERJAYA)
P125	Kimanis	Pengiran Othman Pengiran Rauf from 9 April 1981 (Note: Pengiran Othman was elected to Parliament in the Kimanis by-election, 1981 after the resignation of Pengiran Aliuddin Pengiran Tahir.)	BN (BERJAYA)
P125	Kimanis	Pengiran Aliuddin Pengiran Tahir until 9 March 1981	IND
P126	Hilir Padas	Mohammad Taufeck Asneh	BN (USNO)
P127	Keningau	Stephen Robert Evans	BN (BERJAYA)
P128	Silam	Sakaran Dandai	BN (USNO)
P129	Ulu Padas	Harris Salleh	BN (BERJAYA)
P130	Tawau	Hiew Nyuk Ying	BN (BERJAYA)

=== Sarawak ===
No.	Federal Constituency	Member	Party
BN 23 | SAPO 1
P131	Mas Gading	Patrick Uren	BN (SNAP)
P132	Bandar Kuching	Ong Kee Hui	BN (SUPP)
P133	Santubong	Sulaiman Daud	BN (PBB)
P134	Samarahan	Abdul Taib Mahmud	BN (PBB)
P135	Padawan	Stephen Yong Kuet Tze	BN (SUPP)
P136	Serian	Richard Damping Laki	BN (SUPP)
P137	Simunjan	Bujang Ulis	BN (PBB)
P138	Batang Lupar	Edwin Tangkun	BN (SNAP)
P139	Lubok Antu	Jonathan Narwin Jinggong	BN (SNAP)
P140	Betong	Liben Kato	BN (PBB)
P141	Saratok	Edmund Langgu Saga	BN (SNAP)
P142	Paloh	Abang Abu Bakar Abang Mustapha from 4 May 1981 (Note: Abang Abu Bakar was elected to Parliament in the Paloh by-election, 1981 after the resignation of Abdul Rahman Ya'kub.)	BN (PBB)
P142	Paloh	Abdul Rahman Ya'kub until 25 March 1981	BN (PBB)
P143	Sarikei	Chieng Tiong Kai	BN (SUPP)
P144	Sibu	Wong Soon Kai	BN (SUPP)
P145	Rajang	Jawan Empaling	BN (SUPP)
P146	Mukah	Edwin Esnen Unang from 28 January 1980 (Note: Edwin was elected to Parliament in the Mukah by-election, 1980 after the resignation of Salleh Jafaruddin.)	BN (PBB)
P146	Mukah	Salleh Jafaruddin until 24 December 1979	BN (PBB)
P147	Julau	Thomas Salang Siden	BN (SNAP)
P148	Kanowit	Leo Moggie Irok	BN (SNAP)
P149	Kapit	Leonard Linggi Jugah	BN (PBB)
P150	Ulu Rajang	Sibat Miyut Tagong	BN (SNAP)
P151	Bintulu	Ting Ling Kiew	BN (SNAP)
P152	Lambir	Raymond Szetu Mei Thong	SAPO
P153	Baram	Luhat Wan	BN (SNAP)
P154	Bukit Mas	Racha Umong	BN (PBB)
