= Members of the Dewan Rakyat, 4th Malaysian Parliament =

4th Parliament of Malaysia
←	3rd Parliament	5th Parliament	→

Overview
- Legislative body: Parliament of Malaysia
- Jurisdiction: Malaysia
- Meeting place: Malaysian Houses of Parliament
- Term: 4 November 1974 – 12 June 1978
- Election: 1974 general election
- Government: Second Razak cabinet (until 14 January 1976); First Hussein cabinet
- Website: www.parlimen.gov.my

Dewan Rakyat
- Members: 154
- Speaker: Nik Ahmad Kamil Nik Mahmood (until 20 December 1977); Syed Nasir Ismail
- Deputy Speaker: Syed Nasir Ismail (until 8 January 1978); Azahari Md. Taib
- Secretary: Azizul Rahman Abdul Aziz
- Prime Minister: Abdul Razak Hussein (until 14 January 1976); Hussein Onn
- Leader of the Opposition: Edmund Langgu Saga (until 4 November 1975); Lim Kit Siang
- Party control: Barisan Nasional

Sovereign
- Yang di-Pertuan Agong: Tuanku Abdul Halim Muadzam Shah (until 20 September 1975); Tuanku Yahya Petra

Sessions
- 1st: 4 November 1974 – 19 December 1975
- 2nd: 30 March 1976 – 27 January 1977
- 3rd: 21 March 1977 – 12 January 1978
- 4th: 20 March 1978 – 7 April 1978

This is a list of the members of the Dewan Rakyat (House of Representatives) of the 4th Parliament of Malaysia, elected in 1974.

== Composition ==
State	# of Seats	UMNO Seats	MCA Seats	MIC Seats	PAS Seats	Gerakan Seats	PPP Seats	DAP Seats	Pekemas Seats	PSRM Seats	KITA Seats	IPPP Seats	USNO Seats	SCA Seats	PBB Seats	SNAP Seats	SUPP Seats	IND Seats
Perlis	2	2																
Kedah	13	8	2		3													
Kelantan	12	5			7													
Trengganu	7	4			3													
Penang	9	3	3			3												
Perak	21	10	2	1	1	2	1	4										
Pahang	8	7	1															
Selangor	11	5	4	1				1										
Federal Territory of Kuala Lumpur	5	1		1				2	1									
Negri Sembilan	6	3	1	1				1										
Malacca	4	2	1					1										
Johore	16	11	5															
Sabah	16												13	3				
Sarawak	24														8	9	7	
Seats won	154	61	19	4	14	5	1	9	1	0	0	0	13	3	8	9	7	0
Seats contested	329	61	23	4	14	8	4	46	36	22	4	1	13	0	16	24	0	42

== Elected members by state ==
Shortcut:

Perlis | Kedah | Kelantan | Terengganu | Pulau Pinang | Perak | Pahang | Selangor | Kuala Lumpur | Negeri Sembilan | Melaka | Johor | Sabah | Sarawak

Unless noted otherwise, the MPs served the entire term of the parliament (from 4 November 1974 until 12 June 1978).

=== Perlis ===
No.	Federal Constituency	Member	Party
BN 2
P001	Kangar	Shaari Jusoh	BN (UMNO)
P002	Arau	Syed Hassan Syed Mohamed	BN (UMNO)

=== Kedah ===
No.	Federal Constituency	Member	Party
BN 13
P003	Jerlun-Langkawi	Syed Nahar Syed Sheh Shahabuddin	BN (UMNO)
P004	Kubang Pasu	Mahathir Mohamad	BN (UMNO)
P005	Padang Terap	Ahmad Shukri Abdul Shukur	BN (PAS)
P006	Kuala Kedah	Senu Abdul Rahman	BN (UMNO)
P007	Alor Setar	Oo Gin Sun	BN (MCA)
P008	Kota Setar	Abu Bakar Umar	BN (PAS)
P009	Ulu Muda	Yusof Rawa	BN (PAS)
P010	Baling	Shafie Abdullah	BN (UMNO)
P011	Jerai	Sanusi Junid	BN (UMNO)
P012	Kuala Muda	Khir Johari	BN (UMNO)
P013	Sungei Patani	Wan Zainab M. A. Bakar	BN (UMNO)
P014	Padang Serai	Lim Kiam Hoon	BN (MCA)
P015	Kulim-Bandar Bahru	Azahari Md. Taib	BN (UMNO)

=== Kelantan ===
No.	Federal Constituency	Member	Party
BN 12
P016	Tumpat	Tengku Noor Asiah Tengku Ahmad	BN (UMNO)
P017	Pengkalan Chepa	Nik Abdul Aziz Nik Mat	BN (PAS)
P018	Pasir Mas	Tengku Zaid Tengku Ahmad	BN (PAS)
P019	Kota Bharu	Tengku Ahmad Rithauddeen Tengku Ismail	BN (UMNO)
P020	Bachok	Mohd. Zain Abdullah	BN (PAS)
P021	Rantau Panjang	Zakaria Ismail	BN (PAS)
P022	Nilam Puri	Mohamad Asri Muda	BN (PAS)
P023	Tanah Merah	Mohamed Yaacob	BN (UMNO)
P024	Machang	Abdullah Ahmad	BN (UMNO)
P025	Pasir Puteh	Wan Sulaiman Ibrahim	BN (PAS)
P026	Kuala Krai	Mohd. Zahari Awang	BN (PAS)
P027	Ulu Kelantan	Tengku Razaleigh Hamzah	BN (UMNO)

=== Trengganu ===
No.	Federal Constituency	Member	Party
BN 7
P028	Besut	Zakaria Abdul Rahman	BN (UMNO)
P029	Ulu Nerus	Lukman Abdul Kadir	BN (PAS)
P030	Ulu Trengganu	Engku Muhsein Abdul Kadir	BN (UMNO)
P031	Kuala Nerus	Nik Hassan Abdul Rahman	BN (UMNO)
P032	Kuala Trengganu	Mustafa Ali	BN (PAS)
P033	Dungun	Abdul Wahab Yunus	BN (PAS)
P034	Kemaman	Abdul Manan Othman from 8 May 1976 (Note: Abdul Manan was elected to Parliament in the Kemaman by-election, 1976 after the death of Wan Abdul Kadir Ismail.)	BN (UMNO)
P034	Kemaman	Wan Abdul Kadir Ismail until 14 March 1976	BN (UMNO)

=== Penang ===
No.	Federal Constituency	Member	Party
BN 9
P035	Kepala Batas	Mohamed Sopiee Sheikh Ibrahim	BN (UMNO)
P036	Mata Kuching	Ling Liong Sik	BN (MCA)
P037	Permatang Pauh	Ariffin Md Daud	BN (UMNO)
P038	Bukit Mertajam	Tan Cheng Bee	BN (MCA)
P039	Nibong Tebal	Goh Cheng Teik	BN (Gerakan)
P040	Balik Pulau	Shamsuri Md. Salleh	BN (UMNO)
P041	Bukit Bendera	Albert Mah	BN (MCA)
P042	Tanjong	Lim Chong Eu	BN (Gerakan)
P043	Jelutong	Rasiah Rajasingam	BN (Gerakan)

=== Perak ===
No.	Federal Constituency	Member	Party
BN 17 | DAP 4
P044	Gerik	Shamsuddin Din	BN (UMNO)
P045	Larut	Kamaruddin Mohamed Isa	BN (UMNO)
P046	Parit Buntar	Sulaiman Taib	BN (UMNO)
P047	Bagan Serai	Ramli Omar	BN (UMNO)
P048	Sungei Siput	Samy Vellu	BN (MIC)
P049	Taiping	Paul Leong Khee Seong	BN (Gerakan)
P050	Matang	Hashim Ghazali	BN (UMNO)
P051	Padang Rengas	Abdul Aziz Yeop	BN (UMNO)
P052	Kuala Kangsar	Oon Zariah Abu Bakar	BN (UMNO)
P053	Kinta	Ngan Siong Hin	DAP
P054	Ipoh	Lim Cho Hock	DAP
P055	Menglembu	Fan Yew Teng	DAP
P056	Bruas	Su Liang Yu	BN (PPP)
P057	Parit	Mohd. Bakri Abdul Rais	BN (UMNO)
P058	Batu Gajah	Chian Heng Kai	DAP
P059	Batang Padang	Azharul Abidin Abdul Rahim	BN (UMNO)
P060	Lumut	Richard Ho Ung Hun	BN (MCA)
P061	Hilir Perak	Abu Bakar Arshad	BN (UMNO)
P062	Telok Anson	Au How Cheong	BN (Gerakan)
P063	Tanjong Malim	Mak Hon Kam	BN (MCA)
P064	Bagan Datok	Hassan Adli Arshad	BN (PAS)

=== Pahang ===
No.	Federal Constituency	Member	Party
BN 8
P065	Lipis	Ghazali Shafie	BN (UMNO)
P066	Jerantut	Shariff Ahmad	BN (UMNO)
P067	Kuantan	Mohd Ali M. Shariff	BN (UMNO)
P068	Raub	Abdullah Majid	BN (UMNO)
P069	Maran	Hishamuddin Yahaya	BN (UMNO)
P070	Bentong	Chan Siang Sun	BN (MCA)
P071	Pekan	Najib Razak from 21 February 1976 (Note: Najib was elected to Parliament in the Pekan by-election, 1976 after the death of his father, Abdul Razak Hussein.)	BN (UMNO)
P071	Pekan	Abdul Razak Hussein until 14 January 1976	BN (UMNO)
P072	Temerloh	Hamzah Abu Samah	BN (UMNO)

=== Selangor ===
No.	Federal Constituency	Member	Party
BN 10 | DAP 1
P073	Sabak Bernam	Mustapha Abdul Jabar	BN (UMNO)
P074	Tanjong Karang	Jamil Ishak	BN (UMNO)
P075	Ulu Selangor	Michael Chen Wing Sum	BN (MCA)
P076	Kuala Selangor	Raja Nasron Raja Ishak	BN (UMNO)
P077	Selayang	Rosemary Chow Poh Kheng from 14 June 1975 (Note: Chow was elected to Parliament in the Selayang by-election, 1975 after the death of Walter Loh Poh Khan.)	BN (MCA)
P077	Selayang	Walter Loh Poh Khan until 23 April 1975	BN (MCA)
P078	Ulu Langat	Lee Siok Yew	BN (MCA)
P079	Pelabuhan Kelang	V. Manickavasagam	BN (MIC)
P080	Shah Alam	Lew Sip Hon	BN (MCA)
P081	Petaling	Oh Keng Seng	DAP
P082	Kuala Langat	Aishah Ghani	BN (UMNO)
P083	Sepang	Suhaimi Kamaruddin	BN (UMNO)

=== Federal Territory of Kuala Lumpur ===
No.	Federal Constituency	Member	Party
BN 2 | DAP 2 | Pekemas 1
P084	Kepong	Tan Chee Khoon	Pekemas
P085	Setapak	Mohd. Idris Ibrahim	BN (UMNO)
P086	Damansara	Subramaniam Sinniah	BN (MIC)
P087	Kuala Lumpur Bandar	Lee Lam Thye	DAP
P088	Sungei Besi	Farn Seong Than	DAP

=== Negri Sembilan ===
No.	Federal Constituency	Member	Party
BN 5 | DAP 1
P089	Jelebu	Rais Yatim	BN (UMNO)
P090	Mantin	Lee Boon Peng	BN (MCA)
P091	Seremban	Chen Man Hin	DAP
P092	Kuala Pilah	Abdul Samad Idris	BN (UMNO)
P093	Telok Kemang	K. Pathmanaban	BN (MIC)
P094	Tampin	Mokhtar Hashim	BN (UMNO)

=== Malacca ===
No.	Federal Constituency	Member	Party
BN 3 | DAP 1
P095	Alor Gajah	Ghafar Baba	BN (UMNO)
P096	Jasin	Ahmad Ithnin	BN (UMNO)
P097	Batu Berendam	Chong Hon Nyan	BN (MCA)
P098	Kota Melaka	Lim Kit Siang	DAP

=== Johore ===
No.	Federal Constituency	Member	Party
BN 16
P099	Labis	Musa Hitam	BN (UMNO)
P100	Segamat	Lee San Choon	BN (MCA)
P101	Kluang	Loh Fook Yen	BN (MCA)
P102	Tenggaroh	Abdul Kadir Yusuf	BN (UMNO)
P103	Ledang	Embong Yahya	BN (UMNO)
P104	Pagoh	Syed Nasir Ismail (Deputy Speaker)	BN (UMNO)
P105	Ayer Hitam	Hee Tien Lai	BN (MCA)
P106	Muar	Neo Yee Pan	BN (MCA)
P107	Renggam	Chin Hon Ngian	BN (MCA)
P108	Panti	Saadun Muhammad Noh from 24 February 1977 (Note: Saadun was elected to Parliament in the Panti by-election, 1977 after the death of Syed Jaafar Albar.)	BN (UMNO)
P108	Panti	Syed Jaafar Albar until 14 January 1977	BN (UMNO)
P109	Sri Gading	Hussein Onn	BN (UMNO)
P110	Semerah	Fatimah Abdul Majid	BN (UMNO)
P111	Batu Pahat	Abdul Jalal Abu Bakar	BN (UMNO)
P112	Pontian	Ikhwan Nasir from 28 January 1978 (Note: Ikhwan was elected to Parliament in the Pontian by-election, 1978 after the death of Ali Ahmad.)	BN (UMNO)
P112	Pontian	Ali Ahmad until 4 December 1977	BN (UMNO)
P113	Pulai	Mohamed Rahmat	BN (UMNO)
P114	Johore Bahru	Jaafar Hamzah	BN (UMNO)

=== Sabah ===
No.	Federal Constituency	Member	Party
BN 16
P115	Marudu	Mustapha Harun	BN (USNO)
P116	Bandau	Madina Unggut	BN (USNO)
P117	Kota Belud	Mohamed Said Keruak	BN (USNO)
P118	Labuk-Sugut	Ajad Oyung	BN (USNO)
P119	Tuaran	Buja Gumbilai	BN (USNO)
P120	Kinabalu	Abdul Ghani Gilong	BN (USNO)
P121	Gaya	Peter Lo Sui Yin	BN (SCA)
P122	Penampang	James Stephen Tibok	BN (USNO)
P123	Sandakan	Peter Lim Pui Ho	BN (SCA)
P124	Kinabatangan	Pengiran Ahmad Pengiran Indar	BN (USNO)
P125	Kimanis	Pengiran Aliuddin Pengiran Tahir from 29 January 1977 (Note: Pengiran Aliuddin was elected to Parliament in the Kimanis by-election, 1977 after the death of Pengiran Tahir Pengiran Petra.)	IND
P125	Kimanis	Pengiran Tahir Pengiran Petra until 2 December 1976	BN (USNO)
P126	Hilir Padas	Mohammad Taufeck Asneh	BN (USNO)
P127	Keningau	Harris Salleh from 30 July 1977 (Note: Harris was elected to Parliament in the Keningau by-election, 1977 after the resignation of Stephen Robert Evans.)	BN (BERJAYA)
P127	Keningau	Stephen Robert Evans until 1 June 1977	BN (USNO)
P128	Silam	Mohd. Salleh Abdullah	BN (USNO)
P129	Ulu Padas	Abdul Rashid Jais	BN (USNO)
P130	Tawau	Alex Pang Sui Chee	BN (SCA)

=== Sarawak ===
No.	Federal Constituency	Member	Party
BN 15 | SNAP 9
P131	Bau-Lundu	Patrick Uren	SNAP
P132	Bandar Kuching	Ong Kee Hui	BN (SUPP)
P133	Santubong	Sulaiman Daud	BN (PBB)
P134	Samarahan	Abdul Taib Mahmud	BN (PBB)
P135	Padawan	Stephen Yong Kuet Tze	BN (SUPP)
P136	Serian	Richard Damping Laki	BN (SUPP)
P137	Simunjan	Hadadak D. Pasauk	BN (PBB)
P138	Batang Lupar	Edwin Tangkun	SNAP
P139	Lubok Antu	Jonathan Narwin Jinggong	SNAP
P140	Betong	Wairy Leben Kato	BN (PBB)
P141	Saratok	Edmund Langgu Saga	SNAP
P142	Sarikei	Chieng Tiong Kai	BN (SUPP)
P143	Payang	Abdul Rahman Ya'kub	BN (PBB)
P144	Bandar Sibu	Wee Ho Soon	BN (SUPP)
P145	Rajang	Jawan Empaling	BN (SUPP)
P146	Mukah	Latip Idris	BN (PBB)
P147	Julau	Thomas Salang Siden	SNAP
P148	Kanowit	Leo Moggie Irok	SNAP
P149	Kapit	Abit Angkin	BN (PBB)
P150	Ulu Rajang	Sibat Miyut Tagong	SNAP
P151	Bintulu	Ting Ling Kiew	SNAP
P152	Miri-Subis	Yang Siew Siang	BN (SUPP)
P153	Baram	Luhat Wan	SNAP
P154	Limbang-Lawas	Racha Umong	BN (PBB)
