= Members of the Dewan Rakyat, 6th Malaysian Parliament =

6th Parliament of Malaysia
| ← | 5th Parliament | 7th Parliament | → |

Overview
- Legislative body: Parliament of Malaysia
- Jurisdiction: Malaysia
- Meeting place: Malaysian Houses of Parliament
- Term: 14 June 1982 – 19 July 1986
- Election: 1982 general election
- Government: Second Mahathir cabinet
- Website: www.parlimen.gov.my

Dewan Rakyat
- Members: 154
- Speaker: Mohamed Zahir Ismail
- Deputy Speaker: Hee Tien Lai (until 26 July 1983); Abdul Hamid Pawanteh
- Secretary: Azizul Rahman Abdul Aziz
- Prime Minister: Mahathir Mohamad
- Leader of the Opposition: Lim Kit Siang
- Party control: Barisan Nasional

Sovereign
- Yang di-Pertuan Agong: Tuanku Ahmad Shah (until 25 April 1984); Tuanku Iskandar

Sessions
- 1st: 14 June 1982 – 2 December 1983
- 2nd: 12 March 1984 – 6 December 1984
- 3rd: 25 March 1985 – 6 December 1985
- 4th: 10 March 1986 – 8 April 1986

This is a list of the members of the Dewan Rakyat (House of Representatives) of the 6th Parliament of Malaysia, elected in 1982.

== Composition ==
| State | # of Seats | UMNO Seats | MCA Seats | MIC Seats | PAS Seats | Gerakan Seats | PPP Seats | DAP Seats | PSRM Seats | BERJAYA Seats | USNO Seats | PBB Seats | SNAP Seats | SUPP Seats | SAPO Seats | IND Seats |
|---|---|---|---|---|---|---|---|---|---|---|---|---|---|---|---|---|
| Perlis | 2 | 2 | | | | | | | | | | | | | | |
| Kedah | 13 | 10 | 2 | | 1 | | | | | | | | | | | |
| Kelantan | 12 | 8 | | | 4 | | | | | | | | | | | |
| Terengganu | 7 | 7 | | | | | | | | | | | | | | |
| Penang | 9 | 3 | 2 | | | 2 | | 2 | | | | | | | | |
| Perak | 21 | 11 | 6 | 1 | | 3 | | | | | | | | | | |
| Pahang | 8 | 6 | 2 | | | | | | | | | | | | | |
| Selangor | 11 | 6 | 4 | 1 | | | | | | | | | | | | |
| Federal Territory of Kuala Lumpur | 5 | 1 | 1 | | | | | 3 | | | | | | | | |
| Negeri Sembilan | 6 | 3 | 2 | 1 | | | | | | | | | | | | |
| Malacca | 4 | 2 | 1 | | | | | 1 | | | | | | | | |
| Johor | 16 | 11 | 4 | 1 | | | | | | | | | | | | |
| Sabah | 16 | | | | | | | 1 | | 10 | | | | | | 5 |
| Sarawak | 24 | | | | | | | 2 | | | | 8 | 6 | 5 | | 3 |
| Seats won | 154 | 70 | 24 | 4 | 5 | 5 | 0 | 9 | 0 | 10 | 0 | 8 | 6 | 5 | 0 | 8 |
| Seats contested | 478 | 0 | 0 | 0 | 82 | 0 | 0 | 62 | 0 | 0 | 0 | 0 | 0 | 0 | 1 | 61 |

== Elected members by state ==
Shortcut:

Perlis | Kedah | Kelantan | Terengganu | Pulau Pinang | Perak | Pahang | Selangor | Kuala Lumpur | Negeri Sembilan | Melaka | Johor | Sabah | Sarawak

Unless noted otherwise, the MPs served the entire term of the parliament (from 14 June 1982 until 19 July 1986).

=== Perlis ===
| No. | Federal Constituency | Member | Party |
|---|---|---|---|
BN 2
| P001 | Kangar | Mohd Radzi Sheikh Ahmad | BN (UMNO) |
| P002 | Arau | Abdul Hamid Pawanteh (Note: Abdul Hamid was elected as the Deputy Speaker on 27 June 1983 following the resignation of Hee Tien Lai.) (Deputy Speaker) | BN (UMNO) |

=== Kedah ===
| No. | Federal Constituency | Member | Party |
|---|---|---|---|
BN 12 | PAS 1
| P003 | Jerlun-Langkawi | Sanusi Junid | BN (UMNO) |
| P004 | Kubang Pasu | Mahathir Mohamad | BN (UMNO) |
| P005 | Padang Terap | Baharom Bakar from 19 January 1985 (Note: Baharom was elected to Parliament in the Padang Terap by-election, 1985 following the resignation of Syed Ahmad Syed Mahmud Shahabuddin.) | BN (UMNO) |
| P005 | Padang Terap | Syed Ahmad Syed Mahmud Shahabuddin until 1984 | BN (UMNO) |
| P006 | Kuala Kedah | Mohammad Abu Bakar Rautin Ibrahim | BN (UMNO) |
| P007 | Alor Setar | Oo Gin Sun | BN (MCA) |
| P008 | Kota Setar | Abu Bakar Umar | PAS |
| P009 | Ulu Muda | Othman Abdul from 16 March 1983 (Note: Othman was elected to Parliament in the Ulu Muda by-election, 1983 following the resignation of Hashim Endut.) | BN (UMNO) |
| P009 | Ulu Muda | Hashim Endut until 1983 | BN (UMNO) |
| P010 | Baling | Seroji Haron | BN (UMNO) |
| P011 | Jerai | Ismail Arshad | BN (UMNO) |
| P012 | Kuala Muda | Abdul Daim Zainuddin | BN (UMNO) |
| P013 | Sungei Patani | Wan Zainab M. A. Bakar | BN (UMNO) |
| P014 | Padang Serai | Tan Kok Hooi | BN (MCA) |
| P015 | Kulim-Bandar Bahru | Abdul Kadir Sheikh Fadzir | BN (UMNO) |

=== Kelantan ===
| No. | Federal Constituency | Member | Party |
|---|---|---|---|
BN 8 | PAS 4
| P016 | Tumpat | Dusuki Ahmad | BN (UMNO) |
| P017 | Pengkalan Chepa | Nik Abdul Aziz Nik Mat | PAS |
| P018 | Pasir Mas | Wan Ibrahim Wan Abdullah | PAS |
| P019 | Kota Bharu | Tengku Ahmad Rithauddeen Tengku Ismail | BN (UMNO) |
| P020 | Bachok | Mohd. Zain Abdullah | PAS |
| P021 | Rantau Panjang | Hassan Mohamed | PAS |
| P022 | Nilam Puri | Mohamed Ali | BN (UMNO) |
| P023 | Tanah Merah | Hussein Mahmood | BN (UMNO) |
| P024 | Machang | Mohd. Kassim Ahmed | BN (UMNO) |
| P025 | Pasir Puteh | Wan Mohd. Najib Wan Mohamed | BN (UMNO) |
| P026 | Kuala Krai | Nik Hussein Wan Abdul Rahman | BN (UMNO) |
| P027 | Ulu Kelantan | Tengku Razaleigh Hamzah | BN (UMNO) |

=== Trengganu ===
| No. | Federal Constituency | Member | Party |
|---|---|---|---|
BN 7
| P028 | Besut | Zakaria Abdul Rahman | BN (UMNO) |
| P029 | Ulu Nerus | Mamat Abdul Rahman | BN (UMNO) |
| P030 | Ulu Trengganu | Alias Md. Ali | BN (UMNO) |
| P031 | Kuala Nerus | Ibrahim Azmi Hassan | BN (UMNO) |
| P032 | Kuala Trengganu | Abdul Manan Othman | BN (UMNO) |
| P033 | Dungun | Awang Abdul Jabar | BN (UMNO) |
| P034 | Kemaman | Ismail Said | BN (UMNO) |

=== Penang ===
| No. | Federal Constituency | Member | Party |
|---|---|---|---|
BN 7 | DAP 2
| P035 | Kepala Batas | Abdullah Ahmad Badawi | BN (UMNO) |
| P036 | Mata Kuching | Ling Liong Sik | BN (MCA) |
| P037 | Permatang Pauh | Anwar Ibrahim | BN (UMNO) |
| P038 | Bukit Mertajam | Seow Hun Khim | BN (MCA) |
| P039 | Nibong Tebal | Goh Cheng Teik | BN (Gerakan) |
| P040 | Balik Pulau | Shamsuri Md. Salleh | BN (UMNO) |
| P041 | Bukit Bendera | Gooi Hock Seng | DAP |
| P042 | Tanjong | Koh Tsu Koon | BN (Gerakan) |
| P043 | Jelutong | Karpal Singh | DAP |

=== Perak ===
| No. | Federal Constituency | Member | Party |
|---|---|---|---|
BN 21
| P044 | Gerik | Tajol Rosli Mohd Ghazali | BN (UMNO) |
| P045 | Larut | Kamaruddin Mohamed Isa | BN (UMNO) |
| P046 | Parit Buntar | Abdul Raman Suliman | BN (UMNO) |
| P047 | Bagan Serai | Zainal Abidin Zin | BN (UMNO) |
| P048 | Sungei Siput | Samy Vellu | BN (MIC) |
| P049 | Taiping | Paul Leong Khee Seong | BN (Gerakan) |
| P050 | Matang | Mohamad Razlan Abdul Hamid | BN (UMNO) |
| P051 | Padang Rengas | Saidin Mat Piah | BN (UMNO) |
| P052 | Kuala Kangsar | Rafidah Aziz | BN (UMNO) |
| P053 | Kinta | Lim Liang Seng | BN (MCA) |
| P054 | Ipoh | Peter Chin Gan Oon | BN (MCA) |
| P055 | Menglembu | Yew Foo Weng | BN (MCA) |
| P056 | Bruas | Michael Chen Wing Sum | BN (Gerakan) |
| P057 | Parit | Ahamed Hambal Yeop Majlis | BN (UMNO) |
| P058 | Batu Gajah | Ban Hon Keong | BN (MCA) |
| P059 | Batang Padang | Azharul Abidin Abdul Rahim | BN (UMNO) |
| P060 | Lumut | Ng Cheng Kuai | BN (MCA) |
| P061 | Hilir Perak | Megat Junid Megat Ayub | BN (UMNO) |
| P062 | Telok Anson | Au How Cheong | BN (Gerakan) |
| P063 | Tanjong Malim | Mak Hon Kam | BN (MCA) |
| P064 | Bagan Datok | Yahya Zakaria | BN (UMNO) |

=== Pahang ===
| No. | Federal Constituency | Member | Party |
|---|---|---|---|
BN 8
| P065 | Lipis | Ghazali Shafie | BN (UMNO) |
| P066 | Jerantut | Wan Abu Bakar Wan Mohamad | BN (UMNO) |
| P067 | Kuantan | Abdul Rahim Abu Bakar | BN (UMNO) |
| P068 | Raub | Tan Tiong Hong | BN (MCA) |
| P069 | Maran | Mohd Khalil Yaakob | BN (UMNO) |
| P070 | Bentong | Chan Siang Sun | BN (MCA) |
| P071 | Pekan | Mohamed Amin Daud | BN (UMNO) |
| P072 | Temerloh | Sabbaruddin Chik | BN (UMNO) |

=== Selangor ===
| No. | Federal Constituency | Member | Party |
|---|---|---|---|
BN 11
| P073 | Sabak Bernam | Jamaluddin Suhaimi | BN (UMNO) |
| P074 | Tanjong Karang | Zaleha Ismail | BN (UMNO) |
| P075 | Ulu Selangor | Lee Kim Sai | BN (MCA) |
| P076 | Kuala Selangor | Abu Hassan Omar | BN (UMNO) |
| P077 | Selayang | Rahmah Othman | BN (UMNO) |
| P078 | Ulu Langat | Rosemary Chow Poh Kheng | BN (MCA) |
| P079 | Pelabuhan Kelang | V. Govindaraj | BN (MIC) |
| P080 | Shah Alam | Lew Sip Hon | BN (MCA) |
| P081 | Petaling | Yeoh Poh San | BN (MCA) |
| P082 | Kuala Langat | Aishah Ghani | BN (UMNO) |
| P083 | Sepang | Suhaimi Kamaruddin | BN (UMNO) |

=== Federal Territory of Kuala Lumpur ===
| No. | Federal Constituency | Member | Party |
|---|---|---|---|
DAP 3 | BN 2
| P084 | Kepong | Tan Seng Giaw | DAP |
| P085 | Setapak | Mohammad Idris Mohammad Basari | BN (UMNO) |
| P086 | Damansara | Tan Koon Swan | BN (MCA) |
| P087 | Kuala Lumpur Bandar | Lee Lam Thye | DAP |
| P088 | Sungei Besi | Chan Kok Kit | DAP |

=== Negri Sembilan ===
| No. | Federal Constituency | Member | Party |
|---|---|---|---|
BN 5 | DAP 1
| P089 | Jelebu | Rais Yatim | BN (UMNO) |
| P090 | Mantin | Lee Boon Peng | BN (MCA) |
| P091 | Seremban | Chen Man Hin from 19 November 1983 (Note: Chen was elected to Parliament in the Seremban by-election, 1983 after the resignation of Lee San Choon) | DAP |
| P091 | Seremban | Lee San Choon until 17 September 1983 | BN (MCA) |
| P092 | Kuala Pilah | Napsiah Omar | BN (UMNO) |
| P093 | Telok Kemang | K. Pathmanaban | BN (MIC) |
| P094 | Tampin | Omar Abdullah from 24 September 1983 (Note: In the Tampin by-election, 1983, Omar was elected to fill the seat vacated by Mokhtar Hashim. Mokhtar who was the former Minister Culture, Youth and Sports Minister was sentenced to death by hanging by the high court in Kuala Lumpur for murdering a former Speaker of the Negeri Sembilan State Assembly, Mohamed Taha Talib. In 1984, the death sentence was commuted to life imprisonment by Yang di-Pertuan Agong after considering the Tunku Abdul Rahman's personal letter and petition. However, Yang di-Pertuan Agong approved on Mokhtar's early release from prison in 1991.) | BN (UMNO) |
| P094 | Tampin | Mokhtar Hashim until 1 August 1983 | BN (UMNO) |

=== Malacca ===
| No. | Federal Constituency | Member | Party |
|---|---|---|---|
BN 3 | DAP 1
| P095 | Alor Gajah | Mohd. Adib Mohd. Adam | BN (UMNO) |
| P096 | Jasin | Abdul Ghafar Baba | BN (UMNO) |
| P097 | Batu Berendam | Chong Hon Nyan | BN (MCA) |
| P098 | Kota Melaka | Lim Kit Siang | DAP |

=== Johore ===
| No. | Federal Constituency | Member | Party |
|---|---|---|---|
BN 16
| P099 | Labis | Bahari Haron | BN (UMNO) |
| P100 | Segamat | Subramaniam Sinniah | BN (MIC) |
| P101 | Kluang | Quah Wee Liam | BN (MCA) |
| P102 | Tenggaroh | Khadri Sabran | BN (UMNO) |
| P103 | Ledang | Ngah Abdul Rahman | BN (UMNO) |
| P104 | Pagoh | Muhyiddin Yassin | BN (UMNO) |
| P105 | Ayer Hitam | Hee Tien Lai (Note: Hee resigned as the Deputy Speaker, a post he had held for 1 year on 26 July 1983.) (Deputy Speaker) | BN (MCA) |
| P106 | Muar | Neo Yee Pan | BN (MCA) |
| P107 | Renggam | Chin Hon Ngian | BN (MCA) |
| P108 | Panti | Musa Hitam | BN (UMNO) |
| P109 | Sri Gading | Mustaffa Mohammad | BN (UMNO) |
| P110 | Semerah | Shariffah Dorah Syed Mohammed | BN (UMNO) |
| P111 | Batu Pahat | Daud Taha | BN (UMNO) |
| P112 | Pontian | Mokhtaram Rabidin | BN (UMNO) |
| P113 | Pulai | Mohamed Rahmat | BN (UMNO) |
| P114 | Johore Bahru | Shahrir Abdul Samad | BN (UMNO) |

=== Sabah ===
| No. | Federal Constituency | Member | Party |
|---|---|---|---|
BN 9 | DAP 1 | PBS 1 | IND 5
| P115 | Marudu | Affendy Mohd. Fuad Stephens | IND |
| P116 | Bandau | Newman Gaban | BN (BERJAYA) |
| P117 | Kota Belud | Mohammad Yahya Lampong | IND |
| P118 | Labuk-Sugut | Hassan Alban Sandukong | IND |
| P119 | Tuaran | James Peter Ongkili | BN (BERJAYA) |
| P120 | Kinabalu | Mark Koding | BN (BERJAYA) |
| P121 | Gaya | William Lye Chee Hien | BN (BERJAYA) |
| P122 | Penampang | Clarence E. Mansul | BN (BERJAYA) |
| P123 | Sandakan | Fung Ket Wing | DAP |
| P124 | Kinabatangan | Abdul Ghani Misbah | BN (BERJAYA) |
| P125 | Kimanis | Pengiran Othman Pengiran Rauf | BN (BERJAYA) |
| P126 | Hilir Padas | Mohammed Yussof Yakob | IND |
| P127 | Keningau | Ahmad Shah Hussein Tambakau | BN (BERJAYA) |
| P128 | Silam | Abdillah Abdul Hamid | IND |
| P129 | Ulu Padas | Kadoh Agundong from 12 October 1985 (Note: Kadoh was elected to Parliament in the Ulu Padas by-election, 1985 following the resignation of Harris Salleh.) | PBS |
| P129 | Ulu Padas | Harris Salleh until 1985 | BN (BERJAYA) |
| P130 | Tawau | Kan Yau Fa | BN (BERJAYA) |

=== Sarawak ===
| No. | Federal Constituency | Member | Party |
|---|---|---|---|
BN 19 | DAP 2 | IND 3
| P131 | Mas Gading | Patrick Uren | IND |
| P132 | Bandar Kuching | Sim Kwang Yang | DAP |
| P133 | Santubong | Sulaiman Daud | BN (PBB) |
| P134 | Samarahan | Abdul Taib Mahmud | BN (PBB) |
| P135 | Padawan | Stephen Yong Kuet Tze | BN (SUPP) |
| P136 | Serian | Richard Damping Laki | BN (SUPP) |
| P137 | Simunjan | Bujang Ulis | BN (PBB) |
| P138 | Batang Lupar | Edwin Tangkun | IND |
| P139 | Lubok Antu | Andrew Janggi Muyang | BN (SNAP) |
| P140 | Betong | Alfred Jabu Numpang | BN (PBB) |
| P141 | Saratok | Edmund Langgu Saga | IND |
| P142 | Paloh | Abang Abu Bakar Abang Mustapha | BN (PBB) |
| P143 | Sarikei | Law Hieng Ding | BN (SUPP) |
| P144 | Sibu | Ling Sie Ming | DAP |
| P145 | Rajang | Jawan Empaling | BN (SUPP) |
| P146 | Mukah | Leo Michael Toyad | BN (PBB) |
| P147 | Julau | Thomas Salang Siden | BN (SNAP) |
| P148 | Kanowit | Leo Moggie Irok | BN (SNAP) |
| P149 | Kapit | Leonard Linggi Jugah | BN (PBB) |
| P150 | Ulu Rajang | Justine Jinggot | BN (SNAP) |
| P151 | Bintulu | Ting Ling Kiew | BN (SNAP) |
| P152 | Lambir | George Chan Hong Nam | BN (SUPP) |
| P153 | Baram | Luhat Wan | BN (SNAP) |
| P154 | Bukit Mas | Mutang Tagal | BN (PBB) |
