= Bukit Bintang (Kuala Lumpur federal constituency) =

Malaysian federal constituency

Bukit Bintang (P120)
Kuala Lumpur constituency

Federal constituency
- Legislature: Dewan Rakyat
- MP: Fong Kui Lun; PH
- Constituency created: 1984
- First contested: 1986
- Last contested: 2022

Demographics
- Population (2020): 120,529
- Electors (2022): 79,782
- Area (km²): 21
- Pop. density (per km²): 5,739.5

Bukit Bintang is a federal constituency in the Federal Territory of Kuala Lumpur, Malaysia, that has been represented in the Dewan Rakyat since 1986.

The federal constituency was created in the 1984 redistribution and is mandated to return a single member to the Dewan Rakyat under the first past the post voting system.

== Demographics ==
https://live.chinapress.com.my/ge15/parliament/KUALALUMPUR

Ethnic breakdown of Bukit Bintang's electorate as of 2022
1. Chinese (71.6%)
2. Malay (15.3%)
3. Indian (12.0%)
4. Other ethnicities (1.10%)
Age breakdown of Bukit Bintang's electorate as of 2022
1. 18-20 (2.59%)
2. 21-29 (9.66%)
3. 30-39 (13.0%)
4. 40-49 (15.7%)
5. 50-59 (19.5%)
6. 60-69 (21.0%)
7. 70-79 (12.3%)
8. 80-89 (4.54%)
9. above 90 (1.78%)
Gender breakdown of Bukit Bintang's electorate as of 2022
1. Male (52.3%)
2. Female (47.7%)

According to the August 2022 Electoral Roll used for the 2022 Malaysian general election, the Bukit Bintang constituency has 79,782 registered voters, of whom 15.3% are Malay, 71.6% are Chinese, 12% are Indian, and 1.1% are from other ethnic groups. In the 2018 general election, the constituency had 69,526 registered voters. The 2022 general election saw an increase of 10,256 voters, a 14.75% increase. By ethnic group, the percentage of voters represented by Malays increased by 2.1%, Chinese decreased by 3.6%, Indians increased by 0.7%, and other ethnic groups increased by 0.43%.

Change of electorate in Bukit Bintang (by percentage)
Election	Electorate				Voters	Change
Election	Malay	Chinese	Indian	Other	Voters	Change
2022	15.3	71.6	12	1.1	79,782	+14.75%
2018	13.2	75.2	11.03	0.67	69,526	+24.78
2013	14.37	73.17	10.84	1.72	55,721	-7.11%
2008	16.2	74.64	8.18	0.95	59,986	-7.87%
2004	13	76	11	1	65,112	+3.57%
1999	13.8	76	9.1	1.1	62,865	+5.88%
1995					59,375	-10.11%
1990					66,054	-2.21%
1986					67,548	－

== History ==
=== Polling districts ===
According to the gazette issued on 31 October 2022, the Bukit Bintang constituency has a total of 28 polling districts.

Polling District	Code	Location
Tiong Nam	120/00/01	SJK (C) Chung Kwok
Kampung Semarang	120/00/02	SK (L) Jalan Batu
Jalan Tuanku Abdul Rahman	120/00/03	SK (P) Jalan Batu
Jalan Melayu	120/00/04	SK St. John 1, Bukit Nanas
Medan Pasar	120/00/05	SMK (L) Methodist, Jalan Hang Jebat
Bukit Nanas	120/00/06	SK Convent (2) Bukit Nanas
Imbi Pasar	120/00/07	SMK (P) Bandaraya
Changkat Raja Chulan	120/00/08	St. John's Institution
Bukit Weld	120/00/09	SJK (C) Nan Kai
Medan Imbi	120/00/10	SK Dato Abu Bakar
Kampung Loke Yuen	120/00/11	SJK (C) Chong Fah Phit Chee
Pudu Kanan	120/00/12	SJK (C) Kung Min
Jalan Hang Tuah	120/00/13	SK Jalan Hang Tuah 1
Lebuhraya Foch	120/00/14	SK Methodist (L) Jalan Hang Jebat
Jalan Sultan	120/00/15	Victoria Institution
Jalan Tun Sambanthan	120/00/16	SK La Salle (1) Brickfields
Brickfields Utara	120/00/17	SK (P) Methodist (1) Brickfields
Brickfields Selatan	120/00/18	SMK Vivekananda
Bukit Petaling	120/00/19	SJK (C) Kuen Cheng 1
Persiaran Syed Putra	120/00/20	SM Kuen Cheng
Lapangan Terbang	120/00/21	SK Jalan Bellamy
Razak Mansion	120/00/22	SK Jalan Sungai Besi 1; SK Jalan Sungai Besi 2
Salak Selatan	120/00/23	SJK (C) Confucian
Taman Sungai Besi	120/00/24	SJK (C) Tai Thung
Salak Tempatan Bukit	120/00/25	Dewan SJK (C) Salak South
Salak Tempatan Changkat	120/00/26	SJK (C) Salak South
Salak Tempatan Dalam	120/00/27	Dewan Orang Ramai Kg Baru Salak South
Desa Petaling	120/00/28	SK Desa Petaling

=== Representation history ===
Members of Parliament for Bukit Bintang
Parliament	No	Years	Member	Party	Vote Share
Constituency created from Damansara, Sungai Besi, Kuala Lumpur Bandar and Setapak
7th	P099	1986–1990	Lee Lam Thye (李霖泰)	DAP	37,393; 83.76%
8th	P099	1990–1995	Wee Choo Keong (黄朱强)	GR (DAP)	31,829; 78.86%
9th	P108	1995	Wee Choo Keong (黄朱强)	GR (DAP)	20,403; 57.66%
9th	P108	1996–1999	Lee Chong Meng (李崇孟)	BN (MCA)	20,403; 57.66%
10th	P108	1999–2004	Fong Kui Lun (方贵伦)	BA (DAP)	19,115; 51.25%
11th	P120	2004–2008	Fong Kui Lun (方贵伦)	DAP	19,103; 48.80%
12th	P120	2008–2013	Fong Kui Lun (方贵伦)	PR (DAP)	26,811; 68.14%
13th	P120	2013–2015	Fong Kui Lun (方贵伦)	PR (DAP)	30,408; 73.42%
13th	P120	2015–2018	Fong Kui Lun (方贵伦)	PH (DAP)	30,408; 73.42%
14th	P120	2018–2022	Fong Kui Lun (方贵伦)	PH (DAP)	44,516; 84.94%
15th	P120	2022–present	Fong Kui Lun (方贵伦)	PH (DAP)	43,827; 82.79%

=== Historical boundaries ===
Federal constituency	Area			
Federal constituency	1984	1994	2003	2018
Bukit Bintang	Bukit Bintang; Chow Kit; Kampung Dollah; Pudu; Pusat Bandar Kuala Lumpur	Bukit Bintang; Bukit Petaling; Chow Kit; Kampung Attap; Pusat Bandar Kuala Lumpur		Brickfields; Bukit Bintang; Chow Kit; Desa Petaling; Salak Selatan

=== Local governments & postcodes ===
No.	Local Government	Postcode
P120	Kuala Lumpur City Hall	50000, 50050, 50088, 50100, 50150, 50200, 50250, 50300, 50350, 50450, 50460, 50470, 55100, 55200, 57100 Kuala Lumpur

== Election results ==
Malaysian general election, 2022
Party	Candidate	Votes	%	∆%
PH	Fong Kui Lun	43,827	82.79	▲82.79
BN	Tan Teik Peng	4,850	9.16	▼4.69
PN	Chen Win Keong	4,259	8.05	▲8.05
Total valid votes		52,936	100.00	
Total rejected ballots		218		
Unreturned ballots		93		
Turnout		53,247	66.35	▼9.54
Registered electors		79,782		
Majority		38,977	73.63	▼2.52
PH hold		Swing		
Source(s) https://lom.agc.gov.my/ilims/upload/portal/akta/outputp/1753271/PUB%20613%20(2022)%20-%20PARLIMEN%20WP%20KUALA%20LUMPUR.pdf

Malaysian general election, 2018
Party	Candidate	Votes	%	∆%
PKR	Fong Kui Lun	44,516	84.94	▲84.94
BN	Tan Ean Ean	7,256	13.85	▼12.73
Penang Front Party	Khairul Husni Othman	636	1.21	▲1.21
Total valid votes		52,408	100.00	
Total rejected ballots		254		
Unreturned ballots		103		
Turnout		52,765	75.89	▲0.83
Registered electors		69,526		
Majority		37,260	71.10	▲24.26
PKR hold		Swing		
Source(s) "His Majesty's Government Gazette - Notice of Contested Election, Parliament for the Federal Territory of Kuala Lumpur [P.U. (B) 240/2018]" (PDF). Attorney General's Chambers of Malaysia. 3 May 2018. "Federal Government Gazette - Results of Contested Election and Statements of the Poll after the Official Addition of Votes, Parliamentary Constituencies for the Federal Territory of Kuala Lumpur [P.U. (B) 314/2018]" (PDF). Attorney General's Chambers of Malaysia. 28 May 2018.

Malaysian general election, 2013
Party	Candidate	Votes	%	∆%
DAP	Fong Kui Lun	30,408	73.42	▲5.28
BN	Frankie Gan Joon Zin	11,009	26.58	▼5.28
Total valid votes		41,417	100.00	
Total rejected ballots		355		
Unreturned ballots		52		
Turnout		41,824	75.06	▲7.64
Registered electors		55,721		
Majority		19,399	46.84	▲10.56
DAP hold		Swing		
Source(s) "Federal Government Gazette - Notice of Contested Election, Parliament for the Federal Territory of Kuala Lumpur [P.U. (B) 177/2013]" (PDF). Attorney General's Chambers of Malaysia. 26 April 2013. Archived from the original (PDF) on 2018-10-02. "Federal Government Gazette - Results of Contested Election and Statements of the Poll after the Official Addition of Votes, Parliamentary Constituencies for the Federal Territory of Kuala Lumpur [P.U. (B) 218/2013]" (PDF). Attorney General's Chambers of Malaysia. 22 May 2013. Archived from the original (PDF) on 2 October 2018.

Malaysian general election, 2008
Party	Candidate	Votes	%	∆%
DAP	Fong Kui Lun	26,811	68.14	▲19.34
BN	Lee Chong Meng	12,534	31.86	▼16.17
Total valid votes		39,345	100.00	
Total rejected ballots		466		
Unreturned ballots		630		
Turnout		40,441	67.42	▲6.08
Registered electors		59,986		
Majority		14,277	36.28	▲35.51
DAP hold		Swing		

Malaysian general election, 2004
Party	Candidate	Votes	%	∆%
DAP	Fong Kui Lun	19,103	48.80	▼2.45
BN	Tan Chew Mooi	18,799	48.03	▼0.18
MDP	Wee Choo Keong	1,107	2.83	▲2.83
Independent	Lim Peng Soon	132	0.34	▼0.19
Total valid votes		39,141	100.00	
Total rejected ballots		499		
Unreturned ballots		298		
Turnout		39,938	61.34	▼1.22
Registered electors		65,112		
Majority		304	0.77	▼2.27
DAP hold		Swing		

Malaysian general election, 1999
Party	Candidate	Votes	%	∆%
DAP	Fong Kui Lun	19,115	51.25	▼6.41
BN	Lee Chong Meng	17,981	48.21	▲6.22
Independent	Lim Peng Soon	198	0.53	▲0.53
Total valid votes		37,294	100.00	
Total rejected ballots		733		
Unreturned ballots		1,306		
Turnout		39,333	62.56	▲0.81
Registered electors		62,865		
Majority		1,134	3.04	▼12.63
DAP hold		Swing		

Malaysian general election, 1995
Party	Candidate	Votes	%	∆%
Initially, the Returning Officer had declared Wee Choo Keong as the elected representative for Bukit Bintang at the night of 25 April 1995. However, Lee Chong Meng filed his petition to nullify the election due to the fact that Wee had been convicted of the offence of contempt of Court and fined RM7,000, and hence disqualified to be a Member of Parliament under the provisions of Article 48(l)(e) of the Federal Constitution. Election was declared null and void. The Federal Court had made such a controversial decision to declare Lee Chong Meng as the rightful winner. The appeal was dismissed by the Court of Appeal. No by-election was held by the Election Commission of Malaysia.
DAP	Wee Choo Keong	20,403	57.66	▼21.20
BN	Lee Chong Meng	14,857	41.99	▲20.85
Independent	Teng Chang Khim	123	0.35	▲0.35
Total valid votes		35,383	100.00	
Total rejected ballots		433		
Unreturned ballots		850		
Turnout		36,666	61.75	▲0.35
Registered electors				
Majority		5,546	15.67	▼42.05
DAP hold		Swing		

Malaysian general election, 1990
Party	Candidate	Votes	%	∆%
DAP	Wee Choo Keong	31,829	78.86	▼4.90
BN	Tan Kah Choun	8,534	21.14	▲4.90
Total valid votes		40,363	100.00	
Total rejected ballots		195		
Unreturned ballots		0		
Turnout		40,558	61.40	▼5.12
Registered electors		66,054		
Majority		23,295	57.72	▼9.80
DAP hold		Swing		

Malaysian general election, 1986
Party	Candidate	Votes	%
DAP	Lee Lam Thye	37,393	83.76
BN	Yap Fook Hing	7,248	16.24
Total valid votes		44,641	100.00
Total rejected ballots		292	
Unreturned ballots		0	
Turnout		44,933	66.52
Registered electors		67,548	
Majority		30,145	67.52
This was a new constituency created.
