= Kuala Lumpur Bandar (federal constituency) =

the Federal Territories of Malaysia constituency

Defunct federal constituency
- Legislature: Dewan Rakyat
- Constituency created: 1974
- Constituency abolished: 1986
- First contested: 1974
- Last contested: 1982

Kuala Lumpur Bandar was a federal constituency in the Federal Territories, Malaysia, that was represented in the Dewan Rakyat from 1974 to 1986.

The federal constituency was created in the 1974 redistribution and was mandated to return a single member to the Dewan Rakyat under the first past the post voting system.

== History ==
It was abolished in 1986 when it was redistributed.

=== Representation history ===
Members of Parliament for Kuala Lumpur Bandar
Parliament	No	Years	Member	Party	Vote Share
Constituency created from Bukit Bintang, Bungsar and Batu
4th	P087	1974–1978	Lee Lam Thye (李霖泰)	DAP	15,112; 65.30%
5th	P087	1978–1982	Lee Lam Thye (李霖泰)	DAP	29,567; 79.01%
6th	P087	1982–1986	Lee Lam Thye (李霖泰)	DAP	30,854; 71.96%
Constituency abolished, split into Bukit Bintang and Sungai Besi

=== Historical boundaries ===
Federal constituency	Area
Federal constituency	1974
Kuala Lumpur Bandar	Bukit Bintang; Kampung Dollah; Kuala Lumpur; Maluri; Pudu

== Election results ==
Malaysian general election, 1982
Party	Candidate	Votes	%	∆%
DAP	Lee Lam Thye	30,854	71.96	▼7.05
BN	Wang Choon Wing	12,023	28.04	▲7.05
Total valid votes		42,877	100.00	
Total rejected ballots		334		
Unreturned ballots		0		
Turnout		43,211	73.01	▼0.04
Registered electors		59,186		
Majority		18,831	43.92	▼14.10
DAP hold		Swing		

Malaysian general election, 1978
Party	Candidate	Votes	%	∆%
DAP	Lee Lam Thye	29,567	79.01	▲13.71
BN	Thian Oon Kin	7,853	20.99	▼7.05
Total valid votes		37,420	100.00	
Total rejected ballots		365		
Unreturned ballots		0		
Turnout		37,785	73.05	▲0.52
Registered electors		51,726		
Majority		21,714	58.02	▼20.76
DAP hold		Swing		

Malaysian general election, 1974
Party	Candidate	Votes	%
DAP	Lee Lam Thye	15,112	65.30
BN	Alexander Lee Yu Lung	6,490	28.04
PEKEMAS	Yeoh Teck Chye	1,540	6.65
Total valid votes		23,142	100.00
Total rejected ballots		301	
Unreturned ballots		0	
Turnout		23,443	72.53
Registered electors		46,289	
Majority		8,622	37.26
This was a new constituency created.
