= Matang (federal constituency) =

Former federal constituency in Malaysia

Perak constituency

Defunct federal constituency
- Legislature: Dewan Rakyat
- Constituency created: 1974
- Constituency abolished: 1986
- First contested: 1974
- Last contested: 1982

Matang was a federal constituency in Perak, Malaysia, that was represented in the Dewan Rakyat from 1974 to 1986.

The federal constituency was created in the 1974 redistribution and was mandated to return a single member to the Dewan Rakyat under the first past the post voting system.

== History ==
It was abolished in 1986 when it was redistributed.

=== Representation history ===
Members of Parliament for Matang
Parliament	No	Years	Member	Party	Vote Share
Constituency created from Larut Selatan and Bruas
4th	P050	1974-1978	Hashim Ghazali (هشيم غزالي)	BN (UMNO)	12,543; 68.00%
5th	P050	1978-1982	Hashim Ghazali (هشيم غزالي)	BN (UMNO)	14,706; 61.94%
6th	P050	1982-1986	Mohamad Razlan Abdul Hamid (محمد رزلن عبدالحميد)	BN (UMNO)	15,687; 61.56%
Constituency abolished, split into Bukit Gantang and Kuala Kangsar

=== State constituency ===
Parliamentary constituency	State constituency						
Parliamentary constituency	1955–59*	1959–1974	1974–1986	1986–1995	1995–2004	2004–2018	2018–present
Matang			Bukit Gantang				
Matang			Changkat Jering				

=== Historical boundaries ===
State Constituency	Area
State Constituency	1974
Bukit Gantang	Bukit Gantang; Kampung Sungai Nyior; Kampung Telok; Sungai Kerang; Trong
Changkat Jering	Changkat Jering; Kampung Larut Ulu; Kuala Sepetang; Matang; Simpang

== Election results ==
Malaysian general election, 1982
Party	Candidate	Votes	%	∆%
BN	Mohamad Razlan Abdul Hamid	15,687	61.56	▼0.38
DAP	Zainal Abidin Ahmad @ Adnan	5,268	20.67	▼0.27
PAS	Abdullah Hassan	4,529	17.77	▲0.65
Total valid votes		25,484	100.00	
Total rejected ballots		750		
Unreturned ballots		0		
Turnout		26,234	74.61	▼2.13
Registered electors		35,162		
Majority		10,419	40.89	▼0.11
BN hold		Swing		

Malaysian general election, 1978
Party	Candidate	Votes	%	∆%
BN	Hashim Ghazali	14,706	61.94	▼6.06
DAP	Jamaluddin Yeop Hamzah	4,973	20.94	▼4.90
PAS	Mohd Dali Main	4,065	17.12	▲17.12
Total valid votes		23,744	100.00	
Total rejected ballots		787		
Unreturned ballots		0		
Turnout		24,531	76.74	▲5.23
Registered electors		31,967		
Majority		9,733	41.00	▼1.16
BN hold		Swing		

Malaysian general election, 1974
Party	Candidate	Votes	%
BN	Hashim Ghazali	12,543	68.00
DAP	Fadzlan Yahya	4,766	25.84
PEKEMAS	Tan Kok Kong	639	3.46
Homeland Consciousness Union	Ng Hoe Soon	498	2.70
Total valid votes		18,446	100.00
Total rejected ballots		784	
Unreturned ballots		0	
Turnout		19,230	71.51
Registered electors		26,611	
Majority		7,777	42.16
This was a new constituency created.
