= Batang Padang (federal constituency) =

Perak constituency

Defunct federal constituency
- Legislature: Dewan Rakyat
- Constituency created: 1955
- Constituency abolished: 1986
- First contested: 1955
- Last contested: 1982

Batang Padang was a federal constituency in the Perak, Malaysia, that was represented in the Dewan Rakyat from 1955 to 1986.

The federal constituency was created in the 1955 redistribution and was mandated to return a single member to the Dewan Rakyat under the first past the post voting system.

== History ==
It was abolished in 1986 when it was redistributed.

=== Representation history ===
Members of Parliament for Batang Padang
Parliament	No	Years	Member	Party	Vote Share
Constituency created
Federal Legislative Council
1st		1955-1959	Abdul Hamid Khan (عبدالحميد خن)	Alliance (UMNO)	9,170; 82.21%
Parliament of the Federation of Malaya
1st	P057	1959-1963	Abdul Hamid Khan (عبدالحميد خن)	Alliance (UMNO)	6,231; 54.26%
Parliament of Malaysia
1st	P057	1963-1964	Abdul Hamid Khan (عبدالحميد خن)	Alliance (UMNO)	6,231; 54.26%
2nd	P057	1964–1969	Abdul Hamid Khan (عبدالحميد خن)	Alliance (UMNO)	7,827; 58.68%
		1969-1971	Parliament was suspended		
3rd	P057	1971-1974	Loh Jee Mee (罗意美)	DAP	7,188; 50.37%
4th	P059	1974-1978	Azharul Abidin Abdul Rahim (ازهارول عابدين عبدالرحيم)	BN (UMNO)	9,408; 57.25%
5th	P059	1978–1982	Azharul Abidin Abdul Rahim (ازهارول عابدين عبدالرحيم)	BN (UMNO)	11,911; 61.15%
6th	P059	1982–1986	Azharul Abidin Abdul Rahim (ازهارول عابدين عبدالرحيم)	BN (UMNO)	14,297; 67.62%
Constituency abolished, renamed to Tapah

=== State constituency ===
Parliamentary constituency	State constituency						
Parliamentary constituency	1955–59*	1959–1974	1974–1986	1986–1995	1995–2004	2004–2018	2018–present
Batang Padang	Batang Padang North						
Batang Padang	Batang Padang South						
Batang Padang			Chenderiang				
Batang Padang		Tapah					
Batang Padang		Tapah Road					

=== Historical boundaries ===
State Constituency	Area	
State Constituency	1959	1974
Chenderiang		Kampung Baru Coldstream; Sahom; Sungai Lerek; Pos Woh; Tapah Road
Tapah	Chenderiang; Kampung Lubuk Mas; Sungai Kroh; Tapah; Temoh	Ayer Kuning; Chenderiang; Sungai Kroh; Tapah; Temoh
Tapah Road	Ayer Kuning; Kampung Baru Coldstream; Pos Woh; Sungai Kroh; Tapah Road	

== Election results ==
Malaysian general election, 1982
Party	Candidate	Votes	%	∆%
BN	Azharul Abidin Abdul Rahim	14,297	67.62	▲6.47
DAP	Ibrahim Singgeh	6,847	32.38	▼6.47
Total valid votes		21,144	100.00	
Total rejected ballots		1,012		
Unreturned ballots		0		
Turnout		22,156	75.73	▼1.95
Registered electors		29,255		
Majority		7,450	35.24	▲12.94
BN hold		Swing		

Malaysian general election, 1978
Party	Candidate	Votes	%	∆%
BN	Azharul Abidin Abdul Rahim	11,911	61.15	▲9.82
DAP	Jimmy Loh Jee Mee	7,568	38.85	▼9.82
Total valid votes		19,479	100.00	
Total rejected ballots		651		
Unreturned ballots		0		
Turnout		20,130	77.68	▼1.77
Registered electors		25,914		
Majority		4,343	22.30	▲19.64
BN hold		Swing		

Malaysian general election, 1974
Party	Candidate	Votes	%	∆%
BN	Azharul Abidin Abdul Rahim	9,408	57.25	▲57.25
DAP	Jimmy Loh Jee Mee	7,024	42.75	▼7.62
Total valid votes		16,432	100.00	
Total rejected ballots		1,125		
Unreturned ballots		0		
Turnout		17,557	79.45	▲4.38
Registered electors		22,098		
Majority		2,384	14.50	▲13.76
BN gain from DAP		Swing		?

Malaysian general election, 1969
Party	Candidate	Votes	%	∆%
DAP	Jimmy Loh Jee Mee	7,188	50.37	▲50.37
Alliance	Mohamed Jumah Satir	7,082	49.63	▼9.05
Total valid votes		14,270	100.00	
Total rejected ballots		704		
Unreturned ballots		0		
Turnout		14,974	75.07	▼5.81
Registered electors		19,946		
Majority		106	0.74	▼32.36
DAP gain from Alliance		Swing		?

Malaysian general election, 1964
Party	Candidate	Votes	%	∆%
Alliance	Abdul Hamid Khan Sakhawat Ali Khan	7,827	58.68	▲4.42
PPP	Amirthalingam Sinniah	3,412	25.58	▲25.58
Independent	Jimmy Loh Jee Mee	2,099	15.74	▲15.74
Total valid votes		13,338	100.00	
Total rejected ballots		899		
Unreturned ballots		0		
Turnout		14,237	80.88	▲11.42
Registered electors		17,603		
Majority		4,415	33.10	▲11.49
Alliance hold		Swing		

Malayan general election, 1959
Party	Candidate	Votes	%	∆%
Alliance	Abdul Hamid Khan Sakhawat Ali Khan	6,231	54.26	▼27.95
Independent	Jaya Ramachandran	3,749	32.65	▲32.65
PMIP	Hashim Mahaboob	1,504	13.10	▲13.10
Total valid votes		11,484	100.00	
Total rejected ballots		93		
Unreturned ballots		0		
Turnout		11,577	69.46	▼9.72
Registered electors		16,667		
Majority		2,482	21.61	▼49.68
Alliance hold		Swing		

Malayan general election, 1955
Party	Candidate	Votes	%
Alliance	Abd Hamid Khan	9,170	82.21
National Association of Perak	Mohd Shamsuddin Hamzah	1,218	10.92
Perak Malay League	Abd Majid	766	6.87
Total valid votes		11,154	100.00
Total rejected ballots			
Unreturned ballots			
Turnout		11,154	79.18
Registered electors		14,087	
Majority		7,952	71.29
This was a new constituency created.
Source(s): The Straits Times.
