= Bukit Bintang (Selangor federal constituency) =

Former federal constituency in Selangor

Selangor constituency

Defunct federal constituency
- Legislature: Dewan Rakyat
- Constituency created: 1958
- Constituency abolished: 1974
- First contested: 1959
- Last contested: 1969

Bukit Bintang was a federal constituency in Selangor, Malaysia, that was represented in the Dewan Rakyat from 1959 to 1974 before abolished as part of Federal Territory.

The federal constituency was created in the 1958 redistribution and was mandated to return a single member to the Dewan Rakyat under the first past the post voting system.

== History ==
=== Representation history ===
Members of Parliament for Bukit Bintang
Constituency created from Kuala Lumpur Timor in the state of Selangor
Parliament of the Federation of Malaya
| 1st | P072 | 1959–1963 | Cheah Theam Swee (谢添瑞) | Alliance (MCA) | 6,134; 37.33% |
Parliament of Malaysia
| 1st | P072 | 1963–1964 | Cheah Theam Swee (谢添瑞) | Alliance (MCA) | 6,134; 37.33% |
| 2nd | P072 | 1964–1969 | Tan Toh Hong (陈道方) | Alliance (MCA) | 9,107; 42.51% |
| | | 1969–1971 | Parliament was suspended | | |
| 3rd | P072 | 1971–1972 | Yeoh Teck Chye (杨德才) | GERAKAN | 18,488; 66.92% |
| 3rd | P072 | 1972–1974 | Yeoh Teck Chye (杨德才) | PEKEMAS | 18,488; 66.92% |
Constituency abolished, split into Setapak, Damansara, Kuala Lumpur Bandar and Sungei Besi

=== State constituency ===
| Parliamentary constituency | State constituency | | | | | | |
| Parliamentary constituency | 1955–59* | 1959–1974 | 1974–1986 | 1986–1995 | 1995–2004 | 2004–2018 | 2018–present |
|---|---|---|---|---|---|---|---|
| Bukit Bintang | | Bukit Nanas | | | | | |
| Bukit Bintang | | Kampong Bharu | | | | | |

=== Historical boundaries ===
| State Constituency | Area |
| State Constituency | 1959 |
|---|---|
| Bukit Nanas | Bukit Bintang; Bukit Nanas; Kampung Pandan; Maluri; Taman U-Thant |
| Kampong Bharu | Chow Kit; Kampung Baru; Kampung Padang; Kampung Paya; Pusat Bandar Kuala Lumpur |

== Election results ==
Malaysian general election, 1969
| Party | Candidate | Votes | % | ∆% |
|---|---|---|---|---|
| GERAKAN | Yeoh Teck Chye | 18,488 | 66.92 | ▲66.92 |
| Alliance | Tan Toh Hong | 9,137 | 33.08 | ▼9.43 |
| Total valid votes | | 27,625 | 100.00 | |
| Total rejected ballots | | 1,410 | | |
| Unreturned ballots | | 0 | | |
| Turnout | | 29,035 | 57.35 | ▼8.35 |
| Registered electors | | 50,631 | | |
| Majority | | 9,351 | 33.84 | ▲22.45 |
| GERAKAN gain from Alliance | | Swing | | ? |

Malaysian general election, 1964
| Party | Candidate | Votes | % | ∆% |
|---|---|---|---|---|
| Alliance | Tan Toh Hong | 9,107 | 42.51 | ▲5.18 |
| PAP | Wong Lin Ken | 6,667 | 31.12 | ▲31.12 |
| Socialist Front | Ishak Muhammad | 5,000 | 23.34 | ▼4.61 |
| PMIP | Abdul Aziz Ismail | 650 | 3.03 | |
| Total valid votes | | 21,424 | 100.00 | |
| Total rejected ballots | | 676 | | |
| Unreturned ballots | | 0 | | |
| Turnout | | 22,100 | 65.70 | ▼0.38 |
| Registered electors | | 33,636 | | |
| Majority | | 2,440 | 11.39 | ▲7.13 |
| Alliance hold | | Swing | | |

Malaysian general election, 1959
| Party | Candidate | Votes | % |
|---|---|---|---|
| Alliance | Cheah Theam Swee | 6,134 | 37.33 |
| Independent | Robert K. C. Koh | 5,434 | 33.07 |
| Socialist Front | Mohamed Nazar Nong | 4,593 | 27.95 |
| Independent | Heng Cheng Swee | 270 | 1.64 |
| Total valid votes | | 16,431 | 100.00 |
| Total rejected ballots | | 79 | |
| Unreturned ballots | | 0 | |
| Turnout | | 16,510 | 66.08 |
| Registered electors | | 24,984 | |
| Majority | | 700 | 4.26 |
This was a new constituency created.
