= Marudu =

Sabah constituency

Defunct federal constituency
- Legislature: Dewan Rakyat
- Constituency created: 1966
- Constituency abolished: 2004
- First contested: 1969
- Last contested: 1999

Marudu was a federal constituency in Sabah, Malaysia, that was represented in the Dewan Rakyat from 1969 to 2004.

The federal constituency was created in the 1966 redistribution and was mandated to return a single member to the Dewan Rakyat under the first past the post voting system.

== History ==
It was abolished in 2004 when it was redistributed.

=== Representation history ===
Members of Parliament for Marudu
| Parliament | No | Years | Member | Party | Vote Share |
Constituency created
| | | 1969-1971 | Parliament was suspended | | |
| 3rd | P105 | 1971-1973 | Mustapha Harun (داتو مصطفى داتو هارون) | USNO | Uncontetsted |
| 3rd | P105 | 1973-1974 | Mustapha Harun (داتو مصطفى داتو هارون) | BN (USNO) | Uncontetsted |
| 4th | P115 | 1974-1978 | Mustapha Harun (داتو مصطفى داتو هارون) | BN (USNO) | Uncontetsted |
| 5th | P115 | 1978-1982 | Ashkar Hasbollah (اشكر حسب الله) | BN (USNO) | 4,608; 57.32% |
| 6th | P115 | 1982-1986 | Affendy Mohd. Fuad Stephens (اففيندي محمد. فواد ستيفينس) | Independent | 7,906; 57.10% |
| 7th | P134 | 1986-1990 | Joe Ojihi Supiring (جواي اوجيهي سوڤيريڠ) | Independent | 5,263; 48.48% |
| 8th | P134 | 1990-1995 | Amir Kahar Mustapha (أمير كهار مصطفى) | BN (UMNO) | 8,064; 49.84% |
| 9th | P146 | 1995-1999 | Amir Kahar Mustapha (أمير كهار مصطفى) | GR (PBS) | 10,880; 50.26% |
| 10th | P146 | 1999-2004 | Amir Kahar Mustapha (أمير كهار مصطفى) | BN (UMNO) | 11,850; 59.19% |
Constituency abolished, renamed to Kudat

=== State constituency ===
| Parliamentary constituency | State constituency | | | | | |
| Parliamentary constituency | 1967–1974 | 1974–1985 | 1985–1995 | 1995–2004 | 2004–2020 | 2020–present |
|---|---|---|---|---|---|---|
| Marudu | | Banggi | | | | |
| Marudu | | Bengkoka | | | | |
| Marudu | Bengkoka-Banggi | | | | | |
| Marudu | Kudat | | | | | |

=== Historical boundaries ===
| State Constituency | Area | | | |
| State Constituency | 1966 | 1974 | 1984 | 1994 |
|---|---|---|---|---|
| Banggi | | Banggi; Kampung Delima; Kampung Ranggal; Kampung Sulakalung; Ungkup | | |
| Bengkoka | | Mangkabusu; Pingan Pingan; Pitas; Singgah Mata; Telaga | | |
| Bengkoka-Banggi | Banggi; Bengkoka; Pingan Pingan; Pitas; Singgah Mata | | | |
| Kudat | Bangau; Kudat; Nangka; Tanjong Kapor; Tomborungus | | | |

== Election results ==
Malaysian general election, 1999: Marudu
| Party | Candidate | Votes | % | ∆% |
|---|---|---|---|---|
| BN | Amir Kahar Mustapha | 11,850 | 59.19 | ▲9.45 |
| PBS | Md Zakaria Said | 7,963 | 39.78 | ▼10.48 |
| STAR | Amatus Bernadus Anjun | 206 | 1.03 | ▲1.03 |
| Total valid votes | | 20,019 | 100.00 | |
| Total rejected ballots | | 265 | | |
| Unreturned ballots | | 15 | | |
| Turnout | | 20,299 | 57.12 | ▼10.93 |
| Registered electors | | 35,532 | | |
| Majority | | 3,887 | 19.41 | ▲18.89 |
| BN gain from PBS | | Swing | | ? |

Malaysian general election, 1995: Marudu
| Party | Candidate | Votes | % | ∆% |
|---|---|---|---|---|
| PBS | Amir Kahar Mustapha | 10,880 | 50.26 | ▲50.26 |
| BN | Mohammad Yahya Lampong | 10,766 | 49.74 | ▼0.10 |
| Total valid votes | | 21,646 | 100.00 | |
| Total rejected ballots | | 313 | | |
| Unreturned ballots | | 21 | | |
| Turnout | | 21,980 | 68.05 | ▲9.36 |
| Registered electors | | 32,298 | | |
| Majority | | 114 | 0.52 | ▼1.18 |
| PBS gain from BN | | Swing | | ? |

Malaysian general election, 1990: Marudu
| Party | Candidate | Votes | % | ∆% |
|---|---|---|---|---|
| BN | Amir Kahar Mustapha | 8,064 | 49.84 | ▲6.64 |
| Independent | Joe Ojihi Supiring | 7,790 | 48.14 | ▼0.34 |
| DAP | Chong Jan Fah | 327 | 2.02 | ▲2.02 |
| Total valid votes | | 16,181 | 100.00 | |
| Total rejected ballots | | 146 | | |
| Unreturned ballots | | 0 | | |
| Turnout | | 16,327 | 58.69 | ▲11.91 |
| Registered electors | | 27,819 | | |
| Majority | | 274 | 1.70 | ▼3.58 |
| BN gain from Independent | | Swing | | ? |

Malaysian general election, 1986: Marudu
| Party | Candidate | Votes | % | ∆% |
|---|---|---|---|---|
| Independent | Joe Ojihi Supiring | 5,263 | 48.48 | ▲48.48 |
| BN | Amir Kahar Mustapha | 4,690 | 43.20 | ▲0.30 |
| Independent | Mohamad Ayong | 904 | 8.33 | ▲8.33 |
| Total valid votes | | 10,857 | 100.00 | |
| Total rejected ballots | | 156 | | |
| Unreturned ballots | | 0 | | |
| Turnout | | 11,013 | 46.78 | ▼22.14 |
| Registered electors | | 23,541 | | |
| Majority | | 573 | 5.28 | ▼8.92 |
| Independent hold | | Swing | | |

Malaysian general election, 1982: Marudu
| Party | Candidate | Votes | % | ∆% |
|---|---|---|---|---|
| Independent | Affendy Mohd. Fuad Stephens | 7,906 | 57.10 | ▲57.10 |
| BN | Hamid Mustapha | 5,941 | 42.90 | ▼15.58 |
| Total valid votes | | 13,847 | 100.00 | |
| Total rejected ballots | | 341 | | |
| Unreturned ballots | | 0 | | |
| Turnout | | 14,188 | 68.92 | ▲9.12 |
| Registered electors | | 20,586 | | |
| Majority | | 1,965 | 14.20 | ▼0.44 |
| Independent gain from BN | | Swing | | ? |

Malaysian general election, 1978: Marudu
| Party | Candidate | Votes | % | ∆% |
|---|---|---|---|---|
| BN | Ashkar Hasbollah | 4,608 | 57.32 | ▲57.32 |
| Parti Sabah Demokratik Rakyat | Taulani | 3,431 | 42.68 | ▲42.68 |
| Total valid votes | | 8,039 | 100.00 | |
| Total rejected ballots | | 367 | | |
| Unreturned ballots | | 0 | | |
| Turnout | | 8,406 | 59.76 | |
| Registered electors | | 17,523 | | |
| Majority | | 1,177 | 14.64 | |
| BN hold | | Swing | | |

Malaysian general election, 1974: Marudu
| Party | Candidate | Votes | % | ∆% |
|---|---|---|---|---|
On the nomination day, Mustapha Harun won uncontested.
| BN | Mustapha Harun | | | |
| Total valid votes | | | 100.00 | |
| Total rejected ballots | | | | |
| Unreturned ballots | | | | |
| Turnout | | | | |
| Registered electors | | 14,197 | | |
| Majority | | | | |
| BN gain from USNO | | Swing | | ? |

Malaysian general election, 1969: Marudu
| Party | Candidate | Votes | % |
|---|---|---|---|
On the nomination day, Mustapha Harun won uncontested.
| USNO | Mustapha Harun | | |
| Total valid votes | | | 100.00 |
| Total rejected ballots | | | |
| Unreturned ballots | | | |
| Turnout | | | |
| Registered electors | | 14,086 | |
| Majority | | | |
This was a new constituency created.
