= Bandau (federal constituency) =

Sabah constituency

Defunct federal constituency
- Legislature: Dewan Rakyat
- Constituency created: 1966
- Constituency abolished: 2004
- First contested: 1969
- Last contested: 1999

Bandau was a federal constituency in Sabah, Malaysia, that was represented in the Dewan Rakyat from 1969 to 2004.

The federal constituency was created in the 1966 redistribution and was mandated to return a single member to the Dewan Rakyat under the first past the post voting system.

== History ==
It was abolished in 2004 when it was redistributed.

=== Representation history ===
Members of Parliament for Bandau
Parliament	No	Years	Member	Party	Vote Share
Constituency created
		1969-1971	Parliament was suspended		
3rd	P106	1971-1973	Baudi Unggut	USNO	4,344; 60.93%
3rd	P106	1973-1974	Baudi Unggut	BN (USNO)	4,344; 60.93%
4th	P116	1974-1978	Madina Unggut	BN (USNO)	Uncontested
5th	P116	1978-1982	George Abah Mengimbal	BN (BERJAYA)	3,931; 48.64%
6th	P116	1982-1986	Newman Gaban	BN (BERJAYA)	5,224; 49.45%
7th	P135	1986-1990	Henry Madatang Morejal	BN (PBS)	6,180; 64.13%
8th	P135	1990-1995	George Sangkin	GR (PBS)	9,701; 75.63%
9th	P147	1995-1999	Johnity @ Maximus Ongkili	GR (PBS)	10,716; 64.06%
10th	P147	1999-2004	Johnity @ Maximus Ongkili	PBS	8,465; 51.38%
Constituency abolished, renamed to Kota Marudu

=== State constituency ===
Parliamentary constituency	State constituency					
Parliamentary constituency	1967–1974	1974–1985	1985–1995	1995–2004	2004–2020	2020–present
Bandau	Langkon					
Bandau		Matunggong				
Bandau	Tandek					

=== Historical boundaries ===
State Constituency	Area			
State Constituency	1966	1974	1984	1994
Langkon	Bukah; Kota Marudu; Langkon; Teringai; Tinangol	Kota Marudu; Langkon; Sorinsim; Sungai Rakit; Taginambor		
Matunggong		Bintasan; Bukah; Teringai; Tinangol; Torongkongan		Bukah; Kampung Baring; Langkon; Torongkongan; Nangka
Tandek	Bambangan; Kampung Tanjung Batu Laut; Masolog; Salimandut; Tindukan	Bambangan; Kampung Tanjung Batu Laut; Masolog; Salimandut; Talas		Bandau; Kota Marudu; Salimandut; Samparita; Tandek

== Election results ==
Malaysian general election, 1999
Party	Candidate	Votes	%	∆%
PBS	Johnity @ Maximus Ongkili	8,465	51.38	▼12.68
BN	Maijol Mahap	6,781	41.16	▲41.16
Independent	Baintin Adun	1,228	7.45	▲7.45
Total valid votes		16,474	100.00	
Total rejected ballots		204		
Unreturned ballots		16		
Turnout		16,694	65.66	▼4.06
Registered electors		25,422		
Majority		1,684	10.22	▼18.37
PBS hold		Swing		

Malaysian general election, 1995
Party	Candidate	Votes	%	∆%
PBS	Johnity @ Maximus Ongkili	10,716	64.06	▼11.57
BN	Gapari Katingan @ Geoffrey Kitingan	5,851	34.98	▲34.98
Independent	Jomilon Mojuntin @ Conrad Mojuntin	162	0.97	▲0.97
Total valid votes		16,729	100.00	
Total rejected ballots		198		
Unreturned ballots		5		
Turnout		16,932	69.72	▲11.36
Registered electors		24,287		
Majority		4,865	29.09	▼22.18
PBS hold		Swing		

Malaysian general election, 1990
Party	Candidate	Votes	%	∆%
PBS	George Sangkin	9,701	75.63	▲75.63
Independent	Saibon Abealan	3,126	24.37	▲24.37
Total valid votes		12,827	100.00	
Total rejected ballots		151		
Unreturned ballots		0		
Turnout		12,978	58.36	▲7.95
Registered electors		22,239		
Majority		6,575	51.26	▲17.53
PBS gain from BN		Swing		?

Malaysian general election, 1986
Party	Candidate	Votes	%	∆%
BN	Henry Madatang Morejal	6,180	64.13	▲14.68
Independent	Michael Wong	2,929	30.40	▲30.40
MOMOGUN	Albert Surubi Adun	527	5.47	▲5.47
Total valid votes		9,636	100.00	
Total rejected ballots		156		
Unreturned ballots		0		
Turnout		9,792	50.41	▼16.39
Registered electors		19,425		
Majority		3,251	33.73	▲4.25
BN hold		Swing		

Malaysian general election, 1982
Party	Candidate	Votes	%	∆%
BN	Newman Gaban	5,224	49.45	▲0.81
PASOK	Ignatius Malanjun	2,110	19.97	▲19.97
Independent	Chung Loy Sun	1,903	18.01	▲18.01
Independent	Bidin Sarubin	797	7.54	▲7.54
Independent	Sylvester Chuan	531	5.03	▲5.03
Total valid votes		10,565	100.00	
Total rejected ballots		160		
Unreturned ballots		0		
Turnout		10,725	66.80	▲7.04
Registered electors		16,055		
Majority		3,114	29.48	▲28.94
BN hold		Swing		

Malaysian general election, 1978
Party	Candidate	Votes	%	∆%
BN	George Abah Mengimbal	3,931	48.64	▲48.64
Independent	Michael Wong	3,887	48.10	▲48.10
Parti Sabah Demokratik Rakyat	Hassan Fathal	263	3.25	▲3.25
Total valid votes		8,081	100.00	
Total rejected ballots		159		
Unreturned ballots		0		
Turnout		8,240	59.76	
Registered electors		13,788		
Majority		44	0.54	
BN hold		Swing		

Malaysian general election, 1974
Party	Candidate	Votes	%	∆%
On the nomination day, Madina Unggut won uncontested.
BN	Madina Unggut			
Total valid votes			100.00	
Total rejected ballots				
Unreturned ballots				
Turnout				
Registered electors		11,968		
Majority				
BN gain from Alliance		Swing		?

Malaysian general election, 1969
Party	Candidate	Votes	%
USNO	Baudi Unggut	4,344	60.93
Independent	Majuning Majiun	2,785	39.07
Total valid votes		7,129	100.00
Total rejected ballots		463	
Unreturned ballots		0	
Turnout		7,592	69.40
Registered electors		10,933	
Majority		1,559	21.86
This was a new constituency created.
