= Ganga Nayar =

Malaysian politician

Member of the Selangor State Legislative Assembly for Serendah
- In office 1969–1974
- Preceded by: Lim Cy Howe
- Succeeded by: Constituency abolished

Founder of Malaysian Workers' Party

Personal details
- Born: 3 August 1923 Jaffna, Ceylon (now Sri Lanka)
- Died: 3 April 2009 (aged 85)
- Party: Labour Party of Malaya (1958-1969); Parti Gerakan Rakyat Malaysia (Gerakan) (1969-1974); Democratic Action Party (DAP) (1974-1975); Malaysian Workers' Party (1978-2009)
- Spouse: C.V Nayar.
- Children: 8
- Occupation: Politician

Ganga Nayar (3 August 1923 – 3 April 2009) was a Malaysian politician of Indian descent who founded the Malaysian Workers' Party.

She was known for being the first women to lead a political party in Malaysia. In 1969, upon winning the Serendah state seat, she was also the first woman of Indian descent to be elected to a legislature in Malaysia.

== Political career ==
She joined the Labour Party of Malaya in 1958 at the age of 34 stating that, "Serving with politics and serving without politics is different. When in politics, you can serve with power, more aggressively. Without politics, you serve passively. That's the main reason I went into politics."

After the Labour Party and the Socialist Front (Malayan Peoples' Socialist Front) were decimated by ISA arrests, she then switched allegiance to Parti Gerakan Rakyat Malaysia which was formed ahead of the 1969 elections.

She was the first chief for the party's women's section. In the 1969 general elections, she stood on a Gerakan ticket for the State seat of Serendah with an electorate of nearly 14,000. Although she was the chairman of Gerakan branch in Sentul, she was asked to contest in Serendah after negotiations between Gerakan and DAP, and promptly won the seat.

She left Gerakan after the party joined the Barisan Nasional coalition and joined DAP in 1974. In that year she lost her first bid for a parliamentary seat in Setapak.

The following year, while chairperson of DAP's Damansara branch, she quit the party. Nayar founded and led the Worker's Party (nicknamed the Women's Party) in January 1978 as its president.

She was the party's lone candidate for the 1978 general election and contested the Sungei Besi parliamentary constituency and the Sungei Way state constituency. She failed to win both seats and lost her election deposits.

The logo of the Workers' Party was the hoe and gear with a dark green background, this echoed the logos of the Labour Party of Malaya and the Socialist Front to which she belonged. The dormant party was taken over by Parti Amanah Negara in 2015.

She retired from politics but was still concerned with everyday issues and daily lives of the working class.

She once said "I serve individuals, but people keep telling me that this way, I cannot get any titles or any money if I do not join any party and that is a problem with politics today.

“Politicians no longer serve the people, they serve the party, I am convinced that where there is money politics, not only will the politician fall, the party too will fall."

== Personal life ==
Ganga's father worked as an assistant registrar with the supreme court. He was also famously known as the leader for the Ceylonese Community in Malaya. Her mother served as a teacher. She was married to a freelance journalist, C.V Nayar whom she had 8 children with.

== Election results ==
Parliament of Malaysia
Year	Constituency	Candidate	Votes	Pct	Opponent(s)	Votes	Pct	Ballots cast	Majority	Turnout
1974	P085 Setapak	Ganga Nayar (DAP)	2,944	14.09%	Mohd. Idris Ibrahim (UMNO)	14,743	70.54%	21,077	11,530	60.58%
1974	P085 Setapak	Ganga Nayar (DAP)	2,944	14.09%	Ishak Surin (PEKEMAS)	3,213	15.73%	21,077	11,530	60.58%
1978	P088 Sungai Besi	Ganga Nayar (Workers Party)	1,701	3.19%	Chan Kok Kit (DAP)	40,307	75.61%	33,687	54,185	68.52%
1978	P088 Sungai Besi	Ganga Nayar (Workers Party)	1,701	3.19%	Seman Baba (PAS)	6,620	12.42%	33,687	54,185	68.52%
1978	P088 Sungai Besi	Ganga Nayar (Workers Party)	1,701	3.19%	Lim Heng Kiap (IND)	3,098	5.81%	33,687	54,185	68.52%
1978	P088 Sungai Besi	Ganga Nayar (Workers Party)	1,701	3.19%	Woo Hon Kong (IND)	1,584	2.97%	33,687	54,185	68.52%

Selangor State Legislative Assembly
Year	Constituency	Candidate	Votes	Pct	Opponent(s)	Votes	Pct	Ballots cast	Majority	Turnout
1969	S07 Serendah	Ganga Nayar (Gerakan)	4,504	47.10%	Lim Chy Howe (MCA)	4,220	44.12%	9,564	284	68.66%
1978	Sungei Way	Ganga Nayar (Workers Party)	132	NA	V. L. Kandan (MIC)	7,460	NA	NA	1,726	NA
1978	Sungei Way	Ganga Nayar (Workers Party)	132	NA	K.C Cheah (DAP)	5,734	NA	NA	1,726	NA
1978	Sungei Way	Ganga Nayar (Workers Party)	132	NA	Mohd Amin Abu Bakar (PAS)	1,914	NA	NA	1,726	NA
1978	Sungei Way	Ganga Nayar (Workers Party)	132	NA	Dr Saberi (IND)	NA	NA	NA	1,726	NA

== See also ==
- List of Malaysian politicians of Indian origin
