= 1975 Selayang by-election =

← 1974	14 June 1975	1978 →

P077 seat in the Dewan Rakyat
- Turnout: 57.20%
	First party	Second party	Third party
	BN	DAP	IND
Candidate	Rosemary Chow Poh Kheng	Idrus Idris	Ismail Man
Party	MCA	DAP	Independent
Alliance	BN
Popular vote	19,338	7,434	481
Percentage	70.96%	27.28%	1.76%
MP before election
Walter Loh Poh Khan
BN (MCA)
Elected MP
Rosemary Chow Poh Kheng
BN (MCA)

The Selayang by-election is a parliamentary by-election that was held on 14 June 1975 in the state of Selangor, Malaysia. The Selayang seat fell vacant following the death of its member of parliament Mr. Walter Loh Poh Khan of Barisan Nasional in Selangor. Walter won the seat in 1974 Malaysian general election against 2 other candidates with majority of 9,871.

Rosemary Chow Poh Kheng of Barisan Nasional, won the by election, defeating Idrus Idris of Democratic Action Party and independent politician Ismail Man with a majority of 11,904 votes. The constituency had 48,885 voters.

== Results ==
Malaysian general by-election, 14 June 1975: Selayang Upon the death of incumbent, Walter Loh Poh Khan
Party	Candidate	Votes	%	∆%
BN	Rosemary Chow Poh Kheng	19,338	70.96	▲12.09
DAP	Idrus Idris	7,434	27.28	▲3.04
Independent	Ismail Man	481	1.76	▲1.76
Total valid votes		27,253	100.00	
Total rejected ballots		708		
Unreturned ballots		0		
Turnout		27,961	57.20	▼15.23
Registered electors		48,885		
Majority		11,904	43.68	▲9.05
BN hold		Swing		
