= Setapak (Kuala Lumpur federal constituency) =

Former federal constituency in Kuala Lumpur

the Federal Territories of Malaysia constituency

Defunct federal constituency
- Legislature: Dewan Rakyat
- Constituency created: 1974
- Constituency abolished: 1986
- First contested: 1974
- Last contested: 1982

Setapak was a federal constituency in the Federal Territories, Malaysia, that was represented in the Dewan Rakyat from 1974 to 1986.

The federal constituency was created in the 1974 redistribution and was mandated to return a single member to the Dewan Rakyat under the first past the post voting system.

== History ==
=== Representation history ===
Members of Parliament for Setapak
Parliament	No	Years	Member	Party	Vote Share
Constituency created from Setapak and Bukit Bintang
4th	P085	1974-1978	Mohd. Idris Ibrahim (محمد. إدريس إبراهيم)	BN (UMNO)	14,743; 70.54%
5th	P085	1978-1982	Mohd. Idris Ibrahim (محمد. إدريس إبراهيم)	BN (UMNO)	Uncontested
6th	P085	1982-1986	Mohammad Idris Mohammad Basari (محمد إدريس محمد باسري)	BN (UMNO)	32,348; 65.42%
Constituency abolished, split into Batu and Titiwangsa

=== Historical boundaries ===
Federal constituency	Area
Federal constituency	1974
Setapak	Ayer Panas; Datuk Keramat; Kampung Baru; Kampung Pandan; Wangsa Maju

== Election results ==
Malaysian general election, 1982
Party	Candidate	Votes	%	∆%
BN	Mohammad Idris Mohammad Basari	32,348	65.42	▲65.42
DAP	Mohamad Isa Mohamad Ismail	12,649	25.58	▲25.58
PAS	Othman Abdul Razak	4,452	9.00	▲9.00
Total valid votes		49,449	100.00	
Total rejected ballots		498		
Unreturned ballots		0		
Turnout		49,947	62.23	
Registered electors		80,266		
Majority		19,699	39.84	
BN hold		Swing		

Malaysian general election, 1978
Party	Candidate	Votes	%	∆%
On the nomination day, Mohd. Idris Ibrahim won uncontested.
BN	Mohd. Idris Ibrahim			
Total valid votes			100.00	
Total rejected ballots				
Unreturned ballots				
Turnout				
Registered electors				
Majority				
BN hold		Swing		

Malaysian general election, 1974
Party	Candidate	Votes	%
BN	Mohd. Idris Ibrahim	14,743	70.54
PEKEMAS	Ishak Surin	3,213	15.73
DAP	Ganga Nayar	2,944	14.09
Total valid votes		20,900	100.00
Total rejected ballots		177	
Unreturned ballots		0	
Turnout		21,077	60.58
Registered electors		34,792	
Majority		11,530	54.81
This was a new constituency created.
