= Ashkar Hasbollah =

Malaysian politician

Yang Berbahagia Datuk Ashkar Hasbollah
- اشكر حسب الله

Member of the Malaysian Parliament for Marudu
- In office 1978–1982
- Preceded by: Mustapha Harun
- Succeeded by: Affendy Mohd. Fuad Stephens

Member of the Sabah State Legislative Assembly for Tempasuk
- In office 1976–1981
- Preceded by: New constituency
- Succeeded by: Mohamed Noor Mansoor

Personal details
- Born: Ashkar bin Hasbollah Kota Belud, Sabah
- Citizenship: Malaysian
- Party: USNO
- Other political affiliations: Barisan Nasional
- Occupation: Politician

Ashkar bin Hasbollah is a Malaysian politician from USNO. He was the Member of Parliament for Marudu from 1978 to 1982 and the Member of Sabah State Legislative Assembly for Tempasuk from 1976 to 1981.

== Election results ==
Parliament of Malaysia
Year	Constituency	Candidate	Votes	Pct.	Opponent(s)	Votes	Pct.	Ballots cast	Majority	Turnout
1978	Marudu	Ashkar Hasbollah (USNO)	4,608	57.32%	Taulani (SEDAR)	3,431	42.68%	8,039	1,177	45.88%
