= Lee Lam Thye =

Malaysian politician

Yang Berbahagia Tan Sri Datuk Seri Panglima Lee Lam Thye PSM SPDK SMW DPMS DPMP JMN

Member of the Malaysian Parliament for Bukit Bintang
- In office 3 August 1986 – 20 October 1990
- Preceded by: Constituency established
- Succeeded by: Wee Choo Keong
- Majority: 30,145 (1986)

Member of the Malaysian Parliament for Kuala Lumpur Bandar
- In office 15 September 1974 – 2 August 1986
- Preceded by: Constituency established
- Succeeded by: Constituency abolished
- Majority: 8,622 (1974); 21,714 (1978); 18,831 (1982)

Member of the Selangor State Legislative Assembly for Serdang
- In office 22 July 1978 – 22 April 1982
- Preceded by: Yap Pian Hon
- Succeeded by: Yap Pian Hon
- Majority: 741 (1978)

Member of the Selangor State Legislative Assembly for Bukit Nanas
- In office 10 May 1969 – 24 August 1974

Personal details
- Born: 10 December 1946 (age 79) Ipoh, Perak, Malayan Union (now Malaysia)
- Party: Democratic Action Party (DAP) (until 1990); Independent (1990–present)
- Occupation: Social activist Politician (until 1990)

Lee Lam Thye (Chinese: 李霖泰; pinyin: Lǐ Líntài) is a Malaysian politician and social activist. He is the Chairman of the Alliance for a Safe Community.

He is a former member of the Democratic Action Party (DAP).

== Early life ==
Lee was born on 30 December 1946 in Ipoh, Perak. He completed his secondary education at St Michael's Institution in Ipoh, Perak where he obtained his Senior Cambridge Certificate in 1965.

== Career ==
He was the elected state legislative assemblyman for Bukit Nanas, Selangor from 1969 to 1974. Between 1974 and 1990, Lee served as the three-term and only Member of Parliament for Kuala Lumpur Bandar before it was abolished. Concurrently, he served a single term as state assemblyman between 1978 and 1982 for Serdang. His last political office prior to retirement in 1990 was as the Member of Parliament for Bukit Bintang.

Between 2000 and 2001, Lee was appointed as a member of the Malaysian National Economic Consultative Council (MPEN) and chairman of Mapen II National Unity Committee. He was also elected a member of the Human Rights Commission of Malaysia from 2000 to 2002. Following that, Lee served as a member of the Improvement, Transportation and Management Royal Commission of the Royal Malaysian Police from 2004 to 2005.

For almost 12 years, Lee was a member of the Kuala Lumpur City Hall Advisory Board. He served on the board from 1996 to February 2008. From 2005 to June 2008, he was also chairman of the National Service Training Programme Council.

Other offices or posts that he has held during his decorated career includes:

- Chairman of the National Institute of Occupational Safety and Health, Ministry of Human Resources, Malaysia
- Deputy chairman and executive officer of the Malaysia Crime Prevention Foundation (MCPF)
- Vice-president of the Association for Preventing Drugs Malaysia (PEMADAM)
- Member of the board of trustees of the 1Malaysia Foundation
- Chairman of the Organ Donation Awareness Action Committee, Ministry of Health, Malaysia
- Member of Mental Health Promotion Advisory Council, Ministry of Health, Malaysia
- Member of the Employees Provident Fund (Malaysia)
- Member of the advisory board of the Public Complaints Bureau, Prime Minister's Department (Malaysia)
- Chairman of the board of trustees of S P Setia Foundation
- Member of the board of directors of Open University Malaysia
- Member of the board of trustees of the MAA-Medicare Kidney Charity Fund

== Awards ==
- Outstanding Young Malaysian Award by Jaycees Malaysia (1986)
- Onn Ja'afar Lifetime Achievement Award by Malaysiana Muda (1991)
- Consumer Personality Award (1996)
- Rotary Paul Harris Fellowship Award (1996)
- Sree Narayana Guru Award by Guru Dharma Society (1997)
- Honorary Doctorate in Law from University of Science, Malaysia (USM) (2000)
- Prime Minister's Excellence Award (2001)
- Lions International Melvin Jones Fellowship (2002)
- Honorary Doctorate in Letters from University of Malaysia, Sarawak (UNIMAS) (2002)
- Langkawi Award (2002)
- Healthcare Services Award by Malaysian Medical Association (MMA) (2004)
- Tokoh Keselamatan dan Kesihatan Pekerjaan Kebangsaan (2005)
- Sathya Sai Life Humanitarian Award (2006)
- Anugerah Perpaduan Kebangsaan (2008)
- Toastmasters International Communication and Leadership Award by Toastmasters International District 51 (2009)
- Pinel Award (2010)
- BrandLaureate Brand Icon Leadership Award (2011)
- Tokoh Maulidur Rasul 1441H (2019)

== Election results ==
Selangor State Legislative Assembly
Year	Constituency	Candidate	Votes	Pct	Opponent(s)	Votes	Pct	Ballots cast	Majority	Turnout
1969	N15 Bukit Nanas	Lee Lam Thye (DAP)	13,275	74.31%	Loong Foong Beng (MCA)	4,590	25.69%	19,524	8,685	55.84%
1974	N27 Serdang	Lee Lam Thye (DAP)	2,965	37.89%	Yap Pian Hon (MCA)	3,584	45.80%	8,251	619	78.23%
1974	N27 Serdang	Lee Lam Thye (DAP)	2,965	37.89%	Ching Tow (IND)	980	12.52%	8,251	619	78.23%
1974	N27 Serdang	Lee Lam Thye (DAP)	2,965	37.89%	Pang Kuik My (PEKEMAS)	297	3.80%	8,251	619	78.23%
1978	N27 Serdang	Lee Lam Thye (DAP)	6,554	53.00%	Yap Pian Hon (MCA)	5,813	47.00%	N/A	741	N/A

Parliament of Malaysia
Year	Constituency	Candidate	Votes	Pct	Opponent(s)	Votes	Pct	Ballots cast	Majority	Turnout
1969	P074 Klang	Lee Lam Thye (DAP)	10,772	48.90%	V. Manickavasagam (MIC)	11,257	51.10%	22,999	485	67.18%
1974	P087 Kuala Lumpur Bandar	Lee Lam Thye (DAP)	15,112	65.30%	Alex Lee Yu Lung (Gerakan)	6,490	28.04%	23,443	8,622	72.53%
1974	P087 Kuala Lumpur Bandar	Lee Lam Thye (DAP)	15,112	65.30%	Yeoh Teck Chye (PEKEMAS)	1,540	6.65%	23,443	8,622	72.53%
1978	P087 Kuala Lumpur Bandar	Lee Lam Thye (DAP)	29,567	79.01%	Thian Oon Kin (MCA)	7,853	20.99%	37,785	21,714	73.05%
1982	P087 Kuala Lumpur Bandar	Lee Lam Thye (DAP)	30,854	71.96%	Wang Choon Wing (MCA)	12,023	28.04%	43,211	18,831	73.01%
1986	P099 Bukit Bintang	Lee Lam Thye (DAP)	37,393	83.76%	Yap Fook Hing (MCA)	7,248	16.24%	44,933	30,145	66.52%

== Honours ==
- Malaysia
  - Commander of the Order of Loyalty to the Crown of Malaysia (PSM) – Tan Sri (2002)
  - Companion of the Order of the Defender of the Realm (JMN) (1993)
- Federal Territory (Malaysia)
  - Grand Commander of the Order of the Territorial Crown (SMW) – Datuk Seri (2009)
- Perak
  - Knight Commander of the Order of the Perak State Crown (DPMP) – Dato' (1995)
- Sabah
  - Grand Commander of the Order of Kinabalu (SPDK) – Datuk Seri Panglima (2011)
- Selangor
  - Knight Commander of the Order of the Crown of Selangor (DPMS) – Dato' (2003)

== Literature ==
- Nasionalis humanis. (1994) ISBN 9679373665
- NIOSH: upgrading safety standards in collaboration with industry. Fmm Seminar On Promoting Occupational Safety & Health Awareness In The Manufacturing Sector (1996)
- Keluarga asas pembangunan bangsa. (1996)
- Pembangunan dan alam sekitar. (1996)
- Program Khidmat Sosial Negara: Melahirkan bangsa Malaysia yang berwawasan. (1996)
- KWSP dan pembangunan sosial masyarakat. (1996)
- 李霖泰诤言集 (1996) ISBN 9838201928
- Sekolah wawasan: pengukuh perpaduan dan keperibadian. (1997)
- Occupational safety and health at worksite. (1997)
- Mengantarabangsakan Bahasa Melayu: agenda utama alaf mendatang. (1997)
- Perkhidmatan cekap melalui penswastaan. (1997)
- Membudayakan amalan kebersihan. (1997)
- Isu moral kakitangan kerajaan. (1998)
- Kecelakaan pemandu. (1998)
- Menangani masalah pendatang tanpa izin. (1998)
- As I was saying: viewpoints, thoughts and aspirations of Lee Lam Thye. (1998) ISBN 9679786439
- Akta gangguan seksual. (1999)
- Graduan universiti penguat perpaduan negara. (1999)
- Memurnikan Masyarakat. (2000)
- Perpaduan Secara Sukarela. (2000)
- Pulanglah Cendekiawan Negara. (2001)
- A strong maintenance culture certainly lacking in Malaysia. (2009)
- My Reflections on OSH. (2006) ISBN 9834271417
- Gagasan 1Malaysia melalui landasan seni & budaya (2010) ISBN 9789675552069
