= Sungai Besi (federal constituency) =

Former federal constituency in Kuala Lumpur

the Federal Territories of Malaysia constituency

Defunct federal constituency
- Legislature: Dewan Rakyat
- Constituency created: 1974
- Constituency abolished: 1995
- First contested: 1974
- Last contested: 1990

Sungai Besi was a federal constituency in the Federal Territories, Malaysia, that was represented in the Dewan Rakyat from 1974 to 1995.

The federal constituency was created in the 1974 redistribution and was mandated to return a single member to the Dewan Rakyat under the first past the post voting system.

== History ==
It was abolished in 1995 when it was redistributed.

=== Representation history ===
Members of Parliament for Sungai Besi
Parliament	No	Years	Member	Party	Vote Share
Constituency created from Langat, Damansara and Bungsar
Sungei Besi
4th	P088	1974-1978	Farn Seong Than (范相登)	DAP	14,967; 55.82%
5th	P088	1978-1982	Chan Kok Kit (陈国杰)	DAP	40,307; 75.61%
6th	P088	1982-1986	Chan Kok Kit (陈国杰)	DAP	40,434; 52.97%
Sungai Besi
7th	P102	1986-1990	Tan Kok Wai (陈国伟)	DAP	22,188; 49.12%
8th	P102	1990-1995	Tan Kok Wai (陈国伟)	GR (DAP)	32,169; 56.56%
Constituency abolished, split into Titiwangsa, Cheras and Bandar Tun Razak

=== Historical boundaries ===
Federal constituency	Area	
Federal constituency	1974	1984
Sungai Besi	Cheras; Desa Petaling; Kampung Congo; Kuchai Lama; Sri Petaling	Cheras; Desa Petaling; Kampung Congo; Bukit Jalil; Maluri

== Election results ==
Malaysian general election, 1990
Party	Candidate	Votes	%	∆%
DAP	Tan Kok Wai	32,169	56.56	▲7.44
BN	Tan Chai Ho	23,313	40.99	▼4.75
Independent	Abdul Hamid Selamat	1,389	2.44	▲2.44
Total valid votes		56,871	100.00	
Total rejected ballots		432		
Unreturned ballots		0		
Turnout		57,303	70.87	▲0.86
Registered electors		80,856		
Majority		8,856	15.57	▲12.19
DAP hold		Swing		

Malaysian general election, 1986
Party	Candidate	Votes	%	∆%
DAP	Tan Kok Wai	22,188	49.12	▼3.85
BN	Kee Yong Wee	20,662	45.74	▼0.02
PAS	Shariffuddin Budin	2,320	5.14	▲5.14
Total valid votes		45,170	100.00	
Total rejected ballots		238		
Unreturned ballots		0		
Turnout		45,408	70.01	▼4.38
Registered electors		64,859		
Majority		1,526	3.38	▼3.83
DAP hold		Swing		

Malaysian general election, 1982: Sungei Besi
Party	Candidate	Votes	%	∆%
DAP	Chan Kok Kit	40,434	52.97	▼22.64
BN	Kee Yong Wee	34,929	45.76	▲45.76
Independent	Megat Ahmad Sani Megat Hashim	969	1.27	▲1.27
Total valid votes		76,332	100.00	
Total rejected ballots		637		
Unreturned ballots		0		
Turnout		76,969	74.39	▲5.87
Registered electors		103,469		
Majority		5,505	7.21	▼55.98
DAP hold		Swing		

Malaysian general election, 1978: Sungei Besi
Party	Candidate	Votes	%	∆%
DAP	Chan Kok Kit	40,307	75.61	▲19.79
PAS	Seman Baba	6,620	12.42	▲12.42
Independent	Lim Heng Kiap	3,098	5.81	▲5.81
Amanah	Ganga Nayar	1,701	3.19	▲3.19
Independent	Woo Hon Kong	1,584	2.97	▲2.97
Total valid votes		53,310	100.00	
Total rejected ballots		845		
Unreturned ballots		0		
Turnout		54,185	68.52	▲1.10
Registered electors		79,076		
Majority		33,687	63.19	▲44.24
DAP hold		Swing		

Malaysian general election, 1974: Sungei Besi
Party	Candidate	Votes	%
DAP	Farn Seong Than	14,967	55.82
BN	Shee Koon Ruay	9,886	36.87
PEKEMAS	Ang Chee Meng	1,958	7.30
Total valid votes		26,811	100.00
Total rejected ballots		488	
Unreturned ballots		0	
Turnout		27,299	67.42
Registered electors		42,446	
Majority		5,081	18.95
This was a new constituency created
