= Au How Cheong =

Malaysian politician

Yang Berbahagia Dato' Au How Cheong DPMP PMP KMN AMP
- 欧效翔

Ministerial roles
- 1982–1986: Parliamentary Secretary of Energy, Telecommunications and Posts

Exco roles (Perak)
- 1986–1990: Local Government, Consumer Affairs and Environment

Personal details
- Party: Parti Gerakan Rakyat Malaysia (Gerakan)
- Other political affiliations: Barisan Nasional (BN)

Au How Cheong is a Malaysian politician came from Gerakan.

He was elected as a Member of Parliament for three consecutive terms in the Teluk Intan area, which was originally known as Teluk Anson. In the third term, he was appointed as a Parliamentary Secretary of Ministry of Energy, Telecom and Post.

In 1986, he contested as a Member of the Perak State Legislative Assembly. After winning the Sepetang seat, he was appointed as a Member of the Perak State Legislative Assembly, who was given the task of looking after the portfolio of Local Government, Consumer Affairs and Environment. He retired from politics in 1995.

== Election results ==
Parliament of Malaysia
Year	Constituency	Candidate	Votes	Pct	Opponent(s)	Votes	Pct	Ballots cast	Majority	Turnout
1974	P062 Telok Anson	Au How Cheong (Gerakan)	9,685	50.91%	Chan Fu King (DAP)	8,436	44.35%	19,618	1,249	67.44%
1974	P062 Telok Anson	Au How Cheong (Gerakan)	9,685	50.91%	Chai Kai Wooi (PEKEMAS)	901	4.74%	19,618	1,249	67.44%
1978	P062 Telok Anson	Au How Cheong (Gerakan)	12,773	50.44%	Chan Fu King (DAP)	11,380	44.94%		1,393	
1978	P062 Telok Anson	Au How Cheong (Gerakan)	12,773	50.44%	Mohamad Ngah (PAS)	1,168	4.61%		1,393	
1982	P062 Telok Anson	Au How Cheong (Gerakan)	13,475	49.21%	Chan Fu King (DAP)	12,643	46.17%	28,088	832	69.56%
1982	P062 Telok Anson	Au How Cheong (Gerakan)	13,475	49.21%	Shamsuddin Tamyis (PAS)	1,265	4.62%	28,088	832	69.56%

Perak State Legislative Assembly
Year	Constituency	Candidate	Votes	Pct	Opponent(s)	Votes	Pct	Ballots cast	Majority	Turnout
1986	N09 Sepetang	Au How Cheong (Gerakan)	6,993	55.23%	Chuah Teong San (DAP)	3,416	26.98%	13,317	3,577	69.24%
1986	N09 Sepetang	Au How Cheong (Gerakan)	6,993	55.23%	Mokhtar Lebai Awang (PAS)	2,253	17.79%	13,317	3,577	69.24%
1990	N09 Sepetang	Au How Cheong (Gerakan)	7,899	57.70%	Ahmad Baharom (S46)	5,801	42.37%	14,245	2,098	73.27%

== Honours ==
- Malaysia
  - Officer of the Order of the Defender of the Realm (KMN) (1981)
- Perak
  - Knight Commander of the Order of the Perak State Crown (DPMP) – Dato' (1989)
  - Commander of the Order of the Perak State Crown (PMP) (1987)
  - Member of the Order of the Perak State Crown (AMP) (1979)
