= Rosemary Chow Poh Kheng =

Malaysian politician (1927 – 2023)

Yang Berbahagia Tan Sri Rosemary Chow Poh Kheng PSM DPMS
- 周宝琼

Deputy Minister of Culture, Youth and Sports
- In office 29 April 1982 – 1986
- Monarchs: Sultan Ahmad Shah (1979–1984); Sultan Iskandar (1984–1989)
- Prime Minister: Mahathir Mohamad
- Preceded by: Chin Hon Ngian
- Succeeded by: Wang Choon Wing

Parliamentary Secretary of the Ministry of Health
- In office 1981–1982
- Monarch: Sultan Ahmad Shah (1979–1984)
- Prime Minister: Mahathir Mohamad
- Minister: Chong Hon Nyan

MCA Women Chief
- In office 7 August 1975 – 11 December 1985

Member of the Malaysian Parliament for Ulu Langat
- In office 1978–1986
- Preceded by: Lee Siok Yew (BN–MCA)
- Succeeded by: Lee Kim Sai (BN–MCA)
- Majority: 941 (1978); 8,916 (1982)

Member of the Malaysian Parliament for Selayang
- In office 14 June 1975 – 1978
- Preceded by: Walter Loh Poh Khan (BN–MCA)
- Succeeded by: Rafidah Aziz (BN–UMNO)
- Majority: 11,904 (1975)

Personal details
- Born: 1927
- Died: 28 December 2023 (aged 95–96)
- Party: Malaysian Chinese Association (MCA) (1970–2023)
- Other political affiliations: Barisan Nasional (BN) (1970–2023)
- Occupation: Politician

Rosemary Chow Poh Kheng (1927–28 December 2023) was a Malaysian politician who served as the first women chief of the Malaysian Chinese Association (MCA) from 1975 to 1985, Member of Parliament for Selayang from 1975 to 1978 and Ulu Langat from 1978 to 1986.

== Death ==
Rosemary Chow Poh Kheng died on 28 December 2023.

== Election results ==
Parliament of Malaysia
Year	Constituency	Candidate	Votes	Pct	Opponent(s)	Votes	Pct	Ballots cast	Majority	Turnout
1975	P077 Selayang	Rosemary Chow Poh Kheng (MCA)	19,338	70.96%	Idrus Idris (DAP)	7,434	27.28%	27,961	11,904	57.20%
1975	P077 Selayang	Rosemary Chow Poh Kheng (MCA)	19,338	70.96%	Ismail Man (IND)	481	1.76%	27,961	11,904	57.20%
1978	P078 Ulu Langat	Rosemary Chow Poh Kheng (MCA)	12,539	44.85%	Ong Kwai Leng (DAP)	11,598	41.49%		941	
1978	P078 Ulu Langat	Rosemary Chow Poh Kheng (MCA)	12,539	44.85%	Zainal Abidin Mohd Sidek (PAS)	2,212	7.91%		941	
1978	P078 Ulu Langat	Rosemary Chow Poh Kheng (MCA)	12,539	44.85%	Kampo Radjo Bagindo Kayo (PRM)	902	3.23%		941	
1978	P078 Ulu Langat	Rosemary Chow Poh Kheng (MCA)	12,539	44.85%	Kamarulzaman Ibrahim (PEKEMAS)	706	2.53%		941	
1982	P078 Ulu Langat	Rosemary Chow Poh Kheng (MCA)	18,152	61.35%	Zainal Rampak (DAP)	9,236	31.21%	30,621	8,916	66.52%
1982	P078 Ulu Langat	Rosemary Chow Poh Kheng (MCA)	18,152	61.35%	Yusof Siddiq (PAS)	2,201	7.44%	30,621	8,916	66.52%

== Honours ==
- Malaysia
  - Commander of the Order of Loyalty to the Crown of Malaysia (PSM) – Tan Sri (2007)
- Selangor
  - Knight Commander of the Order of the Crown of Selangor (DPMS) – Datin Paduka (1981)
