= 1974 Malaysian general election =

- 24 August – 14 September 1974

All 154 seats in the Dewan Rakyat 78 seats needed for a majority
- Registered: 4,013,012 (Note: Candidates were returned unopposed in 47 constituencies, reducing the number of eligible voters to 2,956,378.)
- Turnout: 75.01%

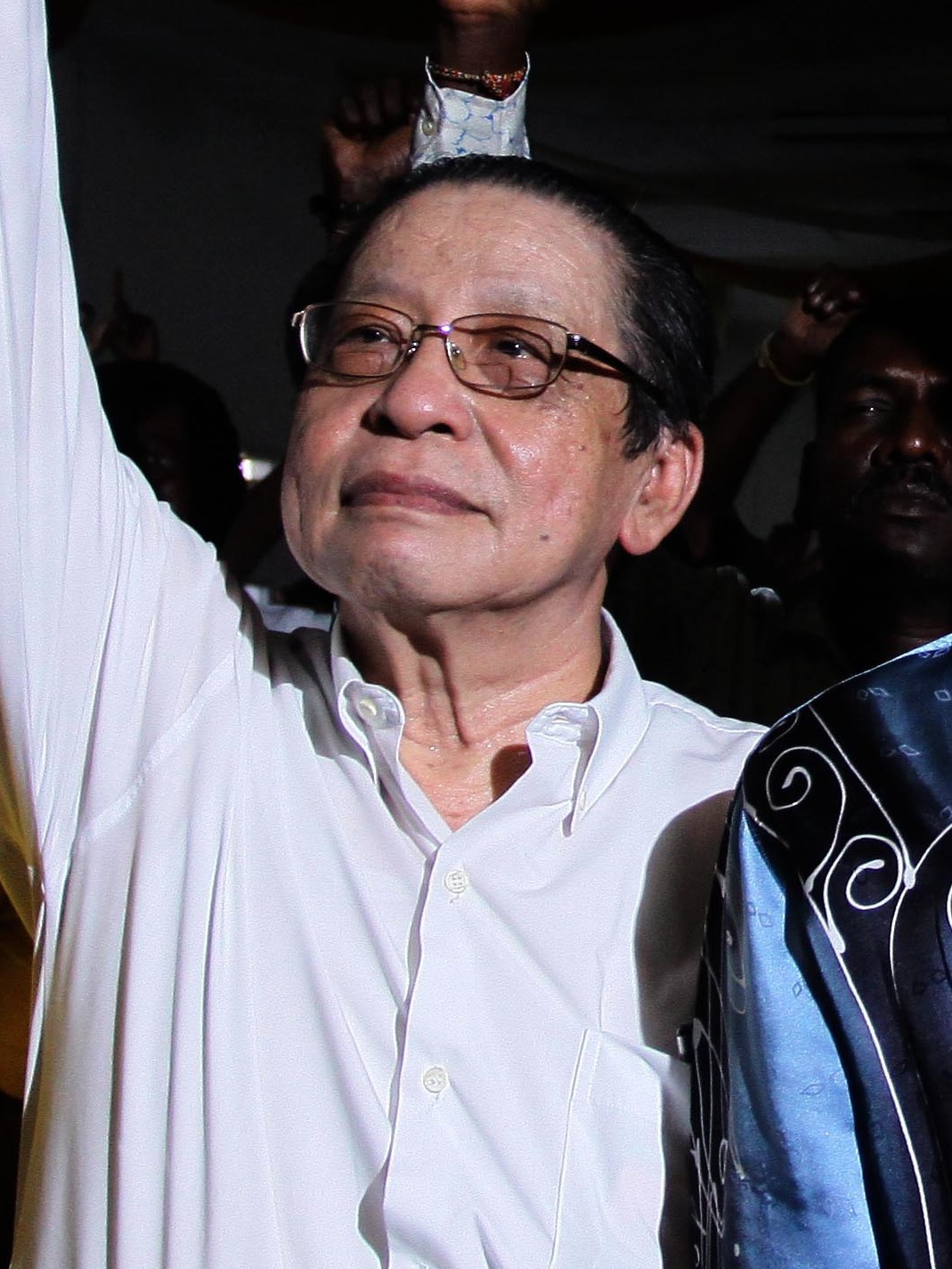

	First party	Second party	Third party
Leader	Abdul Razak Hussein	Lim Kit Siang	James Wong
Party	BN	DAP	SNAP
Last election	82.35%, 121 seats	11.96%, 13 seats	2.70%, 9 seats
Seats won	135	9	9
Seat change	▲14	▼4	Steady
Popular vote	1,287,463	387,845	117,566
Percentage	60.76%	18.30%	5.55%
Swing	▲14.47pp	▲6.34pp	▲2.85pp
- Results by constituency.
Prime Minister before election
Abdul Razak Hussein
BN
Prime Minister-designate
Abdul Razak Hussein
BN

General elections were held in Malaysia between Saturday, 24 August and Saturday, 14 September 1974. Voting took place in all 154 parliamentary constituencies of Malaysia, each electing one Member of Parliament to the Dewan Rakyat, the dominant house of Parliament. State elections also took place in 360 state constituencies (except Sabah) on the same day. The elections were the first and only general elections for Tun Abdul Razak as Prime Minister following his appointment to the position in 1970. They were also the first general elections for Barisan Nasional (BN), a new political alliance replacing the Alliance Party; with the Pan-Malaysian Islamic Party (PAS), Parti Gerakan Rakyat Malaysia (PGRM) and the People's Progressive Party (PPP) joining the parties from the old Alliance.

Once Parliament had been dissolved on 31 July 1974, the Election Commission fixed 8 August 1974, as Nomination Day and 24 August 1974, as Polling Day. Candidates were returned unopposed in 47 constituencies. The 1,060,871 electors from these constituencies therefore did not cast ballots. Another 88 Front members were later successful, thus enabling their alliance to gain an overwhelming majority in the House. This result was a victory for Barisan Nasional which won 135 of the 154 seats. 10 additional Parliament seats was created in the Peninsular Malaysia in 1974.

== Results ==
Party or alliance		Votes	%	Seats	+/–
Barisan Nasional	United Malays National Organisation	1,287,463	60.73	62	+10
Barisan Nasional	Malaysian Chinese Association	1,287,463	60.73	19	+6
Barisan Nasional	Pan-Malaysian Islamic Party	1,287,463	60.73	13	+1
Barisan Nasional	United Sabah National Organisation	1,287,463	60.73	13	0
Barisan Nasional	Parti Pesaka Bumiputera Bersatu	1,287,463	60.73	8	New
Barisan Nasional	Sarawak United Peoples' Party	1,287,463	60.73	7	+2
Barisan Nasional	Parti Gerakan Rakyat Malaysia	1,287,463	60.73	5	–3
Barisan Nasional	Malaysian Indian Congress	1,287,463	60.73	4	+2
Barisan Nasional	Sabah Chinese Association	1,287,463	60.73	3	0
Barisan Nasional	People's Progressive Party	1,287,463	60.73	1	–3
Barisan Nasional	Total	1,287,463	60.73	135	+14
Democratic Action Party		387,845	18.30	9	–4
Sarawak National Party		117,503	5.54	9	0
Malaysian Social Justice Party		108,709	5.13	1	New
Parti Sosialis Rakyat Malaysia		84,206	3.97	0	0
Homeland Consciousness Union		8,625	0.41	0	New
Independent People's Progressive Party		1,356	0.06	0	New
Independents		124,202	5.86	0	–1
Total		2,119,909	100.00	154	+10
Valid votes		2,119,909	95.48		
Invalid/blank votes		100,267	4.52		
Total votes		2,220,176	100.00		
Registered voters/turnout		2,956,378	75.10		
Source: Nohlen et al., IPU, Tindak Malaysia Github

Total Electorate (1974): 4013012. Registered voters shown above is the total electorate of contested seats excluding 47 uncontested seats

*Comparison BN vote growth in pop-up box on the top right since 1969 elections was the comparison between BN (1974) and Alliance with Sabah and Sarawak Alliance (1969)

=== By state ===
Source:Tindak Malaysia GitHub

==== Johore ====
Party or alliance		Votes	%	Seats	+/–
Barisan Nasional	United Malays National Organisation	77,046	36.91	11	0
Barisan Nasional	Malaysian Chinese Association	72,520	34.74	5	0
Barisan Nasional	Total	149,566	71.66	16	0
DAP		43,002	20.60	0	0
PSRM		6,015	2.88	0	0
Independent		10,142	4.86	0	0
Total		208,725	100.00	16	0
Valid votes		208,725	95.71		
Invalid/blank votes		9,354	4.29		
Total votes		218,079	100.00		
Registered voters/turnout		290,491	75.07		

Total voters above refers to total voters of the contested constituencies. Total Electorate of Johor which includes 8 uncontested seats is 495380.

==== Kedah ====
Party or alliance		Votes	%	Seats	+/–
Barisan Nasional	United Malays National Organisation	52,112	47.36	8	+1
Barisan Nasional	Pan-Malaysian Islamic Party	16,475	14.97	3	0
Barisan Nasional	Malaysian Chinese Association	13,420	12.20	2	0
Barisan Nasional	Total	82,007	74.52	13	0
DAP		9,450	8.59	0	0
Homeland Consciousness Union		4,016	3.65	0	New
PSRM		4,099	3.72	0	0
Independents		10,471	9.52	0	0
Total		110,043	100.00	13	+1
Valid votes		110,043	95.19		
Invalid/blank votes		5,562	4.81		
Total votes		115,605	100.00		
Registered voters/turnout		165,675	69.78		

Total Voters above in the table refers to total voters of contested constituencies. Total Electorate of Kedah is 400285 which includes 8 uncontested seats

==== Kelantan ====
Party or alliance		Votes	%	Seats	+/–
Barisan Nasional	Pan-Malaysian Islamic Party	81,280	54.89	7	+1
Barisan Nasional	United Malays National Organisation	29,677	20.04	5	+1
Barisan Nasional	Total	110,957	74.94	12	+2
Independents		37,111	25.06	0	0
Total		148,068	100.00	12	+2
Valid votes		148,068	95.14		
Invalid/blank votes		7,564	4.86		
Total votes		155,632	100.00		
Registered voters/turnout		209,953	74.13		

Total Voters above in the table refers to total voters of contested constituencies. Total Electorate of Kelantan is 400285 which includes 4 uncontested seats

==== Kuala Lumpur ====
Party or alliance		Votes	%	Seats
Barisan Nasional	Parti Gerakan Rakyat Malaysia	15,682	13.77	0
Barisan Nasional	United Malays National Organisation	14,743	12.95	1
Barisan Nasional	Malaysian Chinese Association	9,886	8.68	0
Barisan Nasional	Malaysian Indian Congress	9,763	8.58	1
Barisan Nasional	Total	50,074	43.98	2
Democratic Action Party		42,591	37.41	2
Malaysian Social Justice Party		20,504	18.01	1
Independents		681	0.60	0
Total		113,850	100.00	5
Valid votes		113,850	98.34	
Invalid/blank votes		1,919	1.66	
Total votes		115,769	100.00	
Registered voters/turnout		115,769	100.00	

No seat change information was shown due to formation of Kuala Lumpur Federal Territory from 1st February 1974 (excised from Selangor)

==== Malacca ====
Party or alliance		Votes	%	Seats	+/–
Barisan Nasional	United Malays National Organisation	39,511	34.71	2	0
Barisan Nasional	Malaysian Chinese Association	31,642	27.79	1	0
Barisan Nasional	Total	71,153	62.50	3	0
Democratic Action Party		17,664	15.52	1	0
Malaysian Social Justice Party		12,838	11.28	0	New
PSRM		10,276	9.03	0	0
Independents		1,910	1.68	0	0
Total		113,841	100.00	4	0
Valid votes		113,841	96.16		
Invalid/blank votes		4,550	3.84		
Total votes		118,391	100.00		
Registered voters/turnout		151,699	78.04		

==== Negri Sembilan ====
Party or alliance		Votes	%	Seats	+/–
Barisan Nasional	United Malays National Organisation	14,138	16.10	3	0
Barisan Nasional	Malaysian Chinese Association	26,714	30.43	1	+1
Barisan Nasional	Malaysian Indian Congress	13,295	15.14	1	+1
Barisan Nasional	Total	54,147	61.68	5	+2
Democratic Action Party		27,956	31.84	1	–2
PSRM		1,451	1.65	0	–
Independent People's Progressive Party		1,356	1.54	0	New
Malaysian Social Justice Party		967	1.10	0	New
Independent		1,914	2.18	0	–
Total		87,791	100.00	6	0
Valid votes		87,791	94.52		
Invalid/blank votes		5,088	5.48		
Total votes		92,879	100.00		
Registered voters/turnout		121,097	76.70		

Total Voters above in the table refers to total voters of contested constituencies. Total Electorate of Negeri Sembilan is 178717 which includes 2 uncontested seats

==== Pahang ====
Party or alliance		Votes	%	Seats	+/–
Barisan Nasional	United Malays National Organisation	49,917	54.95	7	+2
Barisan Nasional	Malaysian Chinese Association	12,064	13.28	1	0
Barisan Nasional	Total	61,981	68.23	8	+2
Parti Sosialis Rakyat Malaysia		14,244	15.68	0	0
DAP		11,898	13.10	0	0
Independents		2,721	3.00	0	0
Total		90,844	100.00	8	+2
Valid votes		90,844	94.73		
Invalid/blank votes		5,049	5.27		
Total votes		95,893	100.00		
Registered voters/turnout		126,711	75.68		

Total Voters above in the table refers to total voters of contested constituencies. Total Electorate of Pahang is 199478 which includes 3 uncontested seats

==== Penang ====
Party or alliance		Votes	%	Seats	+/–
Barisan Nasional	Malaysian Chinese Association	46,226	22.05	3	+2
Barisan Nasional	Parti Gerakan Rakyat Malaysia	42,792	20.41	3	–2
Barisan Nasional	United Malays National Organisation	28,331	13.51	3	+2
Barisan Nasional	Total	117,349	55.97	9	+2
Democratic Action Party		51,025	24.34	0	–1
Malaysian Social Justice Party		27,638	13.18	0	New
Parti Sosialis Rakyat Malaysia		12,409	5.92	0	0
Homeland Consciousness Union		1,235	0.59	0	New
Total		209,656	100.00	9	+1
Valid votes		209,656	96.01		
Invalid/blank votes		8,710	3.99		
Total votes		218,366	100.00		
Registered voters/turnout		271,133	80.54		

Total Voters above in the table refers to total voters of contested constituencies. Total Electorate of Penang is 289140 which includes 1 uncontested seat

==== Perak ====
Party or alliance		Votes	%	Seats	+/–
Barisan Nasional	United Malays National Organisation	80,684	20.19	10	+3
Barisan Nasional	Malaysian Chinese Association	33,444	8.37	2	+1
Barisan Nasional	Parti Gerakan Rakyat Malaysia	23,938	5.99	2	+1
Barisan Nasional	Malaysian Indian Congress	9,045	2.26	1	0
Barisan Nasional	People's Progressive Party	45,904	11.49	1	–3
Barisan Nasional	Pan-Malaysian Islamic Party	15,781	3.95	1	0
Barisan Nasional	Total	208,796	52.25	17	+3
Democratic Action Party		144,621	36.19	4	–1
Malaysian Social Justice Party		15,817	3.96	0	New
Homeland Consciousness Union		3,374	0.84	0	New
Independent		27,029	6.76	0	0
Total		399,637	100.00	21	+1
Valid votes		399,637	95.93		
Invalid/blank votes		16,934	4.07		
Total votes		416,571	100.00		
Registered voters/turnout		555,473	74.99		

Total Voters above in the table refers to total voters of contested constituencies. Total Electorate of Perak is 626525 which includes 3 uncontested seats

==== Perlis ====
Party or alliance		Votes	%	Seats	+/–
Barisan Nasional	United Malays National Organisation	29,039	66.99	2	0
Parti Sosialis Rakyat Malaysia		2,796	6.45	0	0
Independents		11,513	26.56	0	0
Total		43,348	100.00	2	0
Valid votes		43,348	94.74		
Invalid/blank votes		2,407	5.26		
Total votes		45,755	100.00		
Registered voters/turnout		58,721	77.92		

==== Sabah ====
Party or alliance		Votes	%	Seats	+/–
Barisan Nasional	United Sabah National Organisation	6,468	60.85	13	0
Barisan Nasional	Sabah Chinese Association			3	0
Barisan Nasional	Total	6,468	60.85	16	0
Malaysian Social Justice Party		4,162	39.15	0	New
Total		10,630	100.00	16	0
Valid votes		10,630	96.03		
Invalid/blank votes		439	3.97		
Total votes		11,069	100.00		
Registered voters/turnout		14,419	76.77		

SCA won all three seats in an uncontested manner. Only one seat was contested in Sabah

==== Sarawak ====
Party or alliance		Votes	%	Seats	+/–
Barisan Nasional	Parti Pesaka Bumiputera Bersatu	82,853	30.94	9	New
Barisan Nasional	Sarawak United Peoples' Party	65,104	24.31	6	+1
Barisan Nasional	Total	147,957	55.25	15	+1
Sarawak National Party		117,503	43.88	9	0
Independents		2,322	0.87	0	–1
Total		267,782	100.00	24	0
Valid votes		267,782	94.81		
Invalid/blank votes		14,657	5.19		
Total votes		282,439	100.00		
Registered voters/turnout		375,882	75.14		

==== Selangor ====
Party or alliance		Votes	%	Seats	+/–
Barisan Nasional	United Malays National Organisation	34,957	16.77	5	–1
Barisan Nasional	Malaysian Chinese Association	64,635	31.01	4	+2
Barisan Nasional	Malaysian Indian Congress	16,277	7.81	1	0
Barisan Nasional	Parti Gerakan Rakyat Malaysia	12,868	6.17	0	-2
Barisan Nasional	Total	128,737	61.76	10	+1
Democratic Action Party		39,638	19.02	1	–2
Malaysian Social Justice Party		26,783	12.85	0	New
Independents		13,283	6.37	0	0
Total		208,441	100.00	11	–3
Valid votes		208,441	95.00		
Invalid/blank votes		10,972	5.00		
Total votes		219,413	100.00		
Registered voters/turnout		290,264	75.59		

Total Voters above in the table refers to total voters of contested constituencies. Total Electorate of Sabah is 337353 which includes 2 uncontested seats

==== Trengganu ====
Party or alliance		Votes	%	Seats	+/–
Barisan Nasional	United Malays National Organisation	34,382	32.06	4	0
Barisan Nasional	Pan-Malaysian Islamic Party	34,850	32.49	3	+1
Barisan Nasional	Total	69,232	64.55	7	+1
Parti Sosialis Rakyat Malaysia		32,916	30.69	0	0
Independents		5,105	4.76	0	0
Total		107,253	100.00	7	+1
Valid votes		107,253	93.82		
Invalid/blank votes		7,062	6.18		
Total votes		114,315	100.00		
Registered voters/turnout		155,825	73.36		

Total Voters above in the table refers to total voters of contested constituencies. Total Electorate of Trengganu is 183769 which includes 1 uncontested seat

== Aftermath ==
After the election, Sarawak National Party (SNAP) became the largest opposition party in the Malaysian parliament and James Wong was appointed the opposition leader. After 2 months, he was detained under Internal Security Act. Datuk Seri Edmund Langgau Anak Saga from the SNAP party later succeeded him. James Wong was detained for almost two years before negotiation led by Datuk Amar Leo Moggie Anak Irok resulting in SNAP joining the Barisan Nasional.

== See also ==
- 1974 Malaysian state elections
