= Ethnic Chinese in the Dewan Rakyat =

There have been 309 ethnic Chinese in the Dewan Rakyat since the establishment of the Parliament of Malaysia. As of 2018, there are 48 representatives, or 21.62% of the body.

Elected Chinese MPs in the 2022 Malaysian general election

Ethnic Chinese together with Malays, Indians and other ethnics in Malaysia have had the right to both vote and sit in parliament since 1959 and all states and territories have been represented by an ethnic Chinese in the Dewan Rakyat. Although ethnic Chinese make up near a quarter of the population, ethnic Chinese are mainly concentrated in urban areas and the parliamentary seat rate is relatively low comparing to other ethnics.

== List of members of Chinese descent ==
This is a complete list of ethnic Chinese who have served as members of the Dewan Rakyat, ordered by seniority. This list includes ethnic Chinese who served in the past and who continue to serve in the present.

Party	Member	Chinese Name	Federal Constituency	Year elected	Year left	Reason
Alliance (MCA)	Lee Thean Hin	李天兴	Alor Star	1955	1959	Retired
Alliance (MCA)	Lim Teng Kwang	林廷光	Kedah Selatan	1955	1959	Retired
Alliance (MCA)	Chee Swee Ee	徐瑞意	George Town	1955	1959	Retired
Alliance (MCA)	Tay Hooi Soo	戴惠思	Wellesley South	1955	1959	Retired
Alliance (MCA)	Leong Yew Koh	梁宇皋	Ipoh-Menglembu	1955	1957	Resigned
Alliance (MCA)	Too Joon Hing	朱运兴	Kinta Selatan	1955	1959	Retired
Alliance (MCA)	Cheah Kay Chuan	謝啟皋	Larut-Matang	1955	1959	Retired
Alliance (MCA)	Omar Ong Yoke Lin	翁毓麟	Kuala Lumpur Barat	1955	1959	Transferred
Alliance (MCA)	Omar Ong Yoke Lin	翁毓麟	Ulu Selangor	1959	1964	Retired
Alliance (MCA)	Cheah Ewe Keat	谢有吉	Kuala Lumpur Timor	1955	1959	Retired
Alliance (MCA)	Lee Eng Teh	李荣德	Selangor Tengah	1955	1959	Defeated
Alliance (MCA)	Lim Kee Siong	林纪祥	Seremban	1955	1959	Not Contested
Alliance (MCA)	Tan Siew Sin	陈修信	Malacca Central	1955	1959	Transferred
Alliance (MCA)	Tan Siew Sin	陈修信	Bandar Malacca	1959	1974	Retired
BN (MCA)	Tan Siew Sin	陈修信	Bandar Malacca	1959	1974	Retired
Alliance (MCA)	Tan Luang Hong	陈銮峰	Johore Selatan	1955	1959	Retired
Alliance (MCA)	Teoh Chze Chong	张子宗	Johore Tengah	1955	1959	Transferred
Alliance (MCA)	Teoh Chze Chong	张子宗	Segamat Selatan	1959	1964	Retired
Alliance (MCA)	Tan Suan Kok	陈宣国	Muar Selatan	1955	1964	Retired
Alliance (MCA)	Lim Joo Kong	林如冈	Alor Star	1959	1964	Retired
Alliance (MCA)	Tan Tye Chek	陈大泽	Kulim-Bandar Bahru	1959	1964	Retired
Alliance (MCA)	Tan Cheng Bee	陈清美	Bagan	1959	1974	Transferred
BN (MCA)	Tan Cheng Bee	陈清美	Bagan	1959	1974	Transferred
BN (MCA)	Tan Cheng Bee	陈清美	Bukit Mertajam	1974	1978	Retired
Alliance (MCA)	Geh Chong Keat	倪宗吉	Penang Utara	1959	1969	Defeated
Socialist Front (Lab)	Tan Phock Kin	陈朴根	Tanjong	1959	1964	Defeated
Socialist Front (Lab)	Lim Kean Siew	林建寿	Dato' Kramat	1959	1969	Retired
Alliance (MCA)	Lim Swee Aun	林瑞安	Larut Selatan	1959	1969	Retired
IND	Yeoh Tat Beng	杨达明	Bruas	1959	1966	Death
Alliance (MCA)	Yeoh Tat Beng	杨达明	Bruas	1959	1966	Death
Alliance (MCA)	Yong Woo Ming	杨武明	Sitiawan	1959	1964	Retired
PPP	Chan Swee Ho	曾瑞豪	Ulu Kinta	1959	1964	Defeated
PPP	Khong Kok Yat	孔国日	Batu Gajah	1959	1964	Defeated
Alliance (MCA)	Leong Kee Nyean	梁圻源	Kampar	1959	1960	Disqualified
PPP	Chan Yoon Onn	陈源安	Kampar	1960	1964	Defeated
Alliance (MCA)	Woo Saik Hong	胡锡康	Telok Anson	1959	1961	Death
IND	(Too Joon Hing)	朱运兴	Telok Anson	1961	1964	Retired
Alliance (MCA)	Lee Seck Fun	李锡勋	Tanjong Malim	1959	1974	Retired
BN (MCA)	Lee Seck Fun	李锡勋	Tanjong Malim	1959	1974	Retired
Alliance (MCA)	Chan Siang Sun	陈声新	Bentong	1959	1989	Death
BN (MCA)	Chan Siang Sun	陈声新	Bentong	1959	1989	Death
Socialist Front (Lab)	Ng Ann Teck	黄汉德	Batu	1959	1964	Retired
Socialist Front (Lab)	Liu Yoong Peng	刘云鹏	Rawang	1959	1964	Retired
Alliance (MCA)	Cheah Theam Swee	谢添瑞	Bukit Bintang	1959	1964	Retired
Alliance (MCA)	Lee Siok Yew	李孝友	Sepang	1959	1974	Transferred
BN (MCA)	Lee Siok Yew	李孝友	Sepang	1959	1974	Transferred
BN (MCA)	Lee Siok Yew	李孝友	Ulu Langat	1974	1978	Retired
IND	Chin See Yin	陈世英	Seremban Timor	1959	1964	Retired
IND	Quek Kai Dong	郭开东	Seremban Barat	1959	1964	Transferred
BN (MCA)	Quek Kai Dong	郭开东	Seremban Timor	1964	1969	Retired
Alliance (MCA)	Tan Kee Gak	陈期岳	Bandar Malacca	1959	1969	Retired
Alliance (MCA)	Seah Teng Ngiab	佘镇业	Muar Pantai	1959	1974	Retired
BN (MCA)	Seah Teng Ngiab	佘镇业	Muar Pantai	1959	1974	Retired
Alliance (MCA)	Kang Kok Seng	江国盛	Batu Pahat	1959	1964	Retired
Alliance (MCA)	Lee San Choon	李三春	Kluang Utara	1959	1964	Transferred
Alliance (MCA)	Lee San Choon	李三春	Segamat Selatan	1964	1974	Transferred
BN (MCA)	Lee San Choon	李三春	Segamat Selatan	1964	1974	Transferred
BN (MCA)	Lee San Choon	李三春	Segamat	1974	1982	Transferred
BN (MCA)	Lee San Choon	李三春	Seremban	1982	1983	Resigned
Alliance (MCA)	Chan Chong Wen	曾崇文	Kluang Selatan	1959	1969	Retired
Alliance (MCA)	Lim Pee Hung	林维翰	Alor Star	1964	1974	Retired
BN (MCA)	Lim Pee Hung	林维翰	Alor Star	1964	1974	Retired
Alliance (MCA)	Tai Kuan Yang	戴观阳	Kulim-Bandar Bahru	1964	1974	Retired
BN (MCA)	Tai Kuan Yang	戴观阳	Kulim-Bandar Bahru	1964	1974	Retired
UDP	Lim Chong Eu	林苍祐	Tanjong	1964	1978	Retired
Gerakan	Lim Chong Eu	林苍祐	Tanjong	1964	1978	Retired
BN (Gerakan)	Lim Chong Eu	林苍祐	Tanjong	1964	1978	Retired
Alliance (MCA)	Chew Biow Chuon	周苗存	Bruas	1966	1969	Retired
Alliance (MCA)	Kam Woon Wah	甘文华	Sitiawan	1964	1969	Defeated
Alliance (MCA)	Chin Foon	甄宽	Ulu Kinta	1964	1969	Defeated
Alliance (MCA)	Ng Fah Yam	吴华炎	Batu Gajah	1964	1969	Defeated
Alliance (MCA)	Toh Theam Hock	杜添福	Kampar	1964	1969	Defeated
Alliance (MCA)	Ng Kam Poh	吴锦波	Telok Anson	1964	1969	Defeated
Socialist Front (Lab)	Tan Chee Khoon	陈志勤	Batu	1964	1974	Transferred
Gerakan	Tan Chee Khoon	陈志勤	Batu	1964	1974	Transferred
BN (Gerakan)	Tan Chee Khoon	陈志勤	Batu	1964	1974	Transferred
Pekemas	Tan Chee Khoon	陈志勤	Kepong	1974	1978	Retired
Alliance (MCA)	Chan Seong Yoon	詹祥云	Setapak	1964	1969	Retired
Alliance (MCA)	Tan Toh Hong	陈道方	Bukit Bintang	1964	1969	Defeated
Alliance (MCA)	Michael Chen Wing Sum	曾永森	Damansara	1964	1969	Defeated
Alliance (MCA)	Khaw Kai Boh	许启谟	Ulu Selangor	1964	1972	Death
Alliance (MCA)	Siow Loong Hin	萧隆兴	Seremban Barat	1964	1969	Retired
Alliance (MCA)	Soh Ah Teck	苏宜德	Batu Pahat	1964	1974	Retired
BN (MCA)	Soh Ah Teck	苏宜德	Batu Pahat	1964	1974	Retired
Alliance (MCA)	Tiah Eng Bee	程荣美	Kluang Utara	1964	1974	Retired
BN (MCA)	Tiah Eng Bee	程荣美	Kluang Utara	1964	1974	Retired
Gerakan	Ng Hoe Hun	黄和汉	Larut Selatan	1971	1974	Retired
BN (Gerakan)	Ng Hoe Hun	黄和汉	Larut Selatan	1971	1974	Retired
PPP	Su Liang Yu	苏良佑	Bruas	1971	1974	Retired
BN (PPP)	Su Liang Yu	苏良佑	Bruas	1971	1974	Retired
DAP	Richard Ho Ung Hun	何文翰	Sitiawan	1971	1974	Transferred
Alliance (MCA)	Richard Ho Ung Hun	何文翰	Sitiawan	1971	1974	Transferred
BN (MCA)	Richard Ho Ung Hun	何文翰	Sitiawan	1971	1974	Transferred
BN (MCA)	Richard Ho Ung Hun	何文翰	Lumut	1971	1982	Retired
PPP	(Chan Yoon Onn)	陈源安	Ulu Kinta	1971	1974	Retired
BN (PPP)	(Chan Yoon Onn)	陈源安	Ulu Kinta	1971	1974	Retired
DAP	Lim Cho Hock	林子鹤	Batu Gajah	1971	1974	Transferred
DAP	Lim Cho Hock	林子鹤	Ipoh	1974	1982	Defeated
DAP	Fan Yew Teng	范俊登	Kampar	1971	1974	Transferred
DAP	Fan Yew Teng	范俊登	Menglembu	1974	1978	Retired
DAP	Chan Fu King	陈富京	Telok Anson	1971	1974	Defeated
DAP	Loh Jee Mee	罗意美	Batang Padang	1971	1974	Defeated
DAP	Walter Loh Poh Khan	罗宝根	Setapak	1971	1974	Transferred
Alliance (MCA)	Walter Loh Poh Khan	罗宝根	Setapak	1971	1974	Transferred
BN (MCA)	Walter Loh Poh Khan	罗宝根	Selayang	1974	1975	Death
DAP	Goh Hock Guan	吴富源	Bangsar	1971	1974	Defeated
Gerakan	Yeoh Teck Chye	杨德才	Bukit Bintang	1971	1974	Retired
Pekemas	Yeoh Teck Chye	杨德才	Bukit Bintang	1971	1974	Retired
DAP	Hor Cheok Foon	何卓欢	Damansara	1971	1974	Defeated
DAP	Chen Man Hin	曾敏兴	Seremban Timor	1971	1964	Transferred
DAP	Chen Man Hin	曾敏兴	Seremban	1974	1978	Defeated
DAP	Lim Kit Siang	林吉祥	Bandar Malacca	1971	1974	Transferred
DAP	Lim Kit Siang	林吉祥	Kota Melaka	1974	1978	Transferred
DAP	Lim Kit Siang	林吉祥	Petaling	1978	1982	Transferred
DAP	Lim Kit Siang	林吉祥	Kota Melaka	1982	1986	Transferred
DAP	Lim Kit Siang	林吉祥	Tanjong	1986	1999	Defeated
Alliance (MCA)	Chu Chee Peng	朱子平	Kluang Selatan	1971	1974	Retired
BN (MCA)	Chu Chee Peng	朱子平	Kluang Selatan	1971	1974	Retired
SCA	Pang Tet Tshung	彭德聪	Kota Kinabalu	1971	1974	Retired
BN (SCA)	Pang Tet Tshung	彭德聪	Kota Kinabalu	1971	1974	Retired
SCA	Peter Lo Sui Yin	罗思仁	Sandakan	1971	1974	Transferred
BN (SCA)	Peter Lo Sui Yin	罗思仁	Sandakan	1971	1974	Transferred
BN (SCA)	Peter Lo Sui Yin	罗思仁	Gaya	1974	1978	Retired
SCA	Yeh Pao Tzu	叶保滋	Tawau	1971	1974	Retired
BN (SCA)	Yeh Pao Tzu	叶保滋	Tawau	1971	1974	Retired
SUPP	Ong Kee Hui	王其辉	Bandar Kuching	1971	1982	Retired
BN (SUPP)	Ong Kee Hui	王其辉	Bandar Kuching	1971	1982	Retired
SUPP	Stephen Yong Kuet Tze	杨国斯	Padawan	1971	1990	Retired
BN (SUPP)	Stephen Yong Kuet Tze	杨国斯	Padawan	1971	1990	Retired
SCA	Chen Ko Ming	陈高明	Sarikei	1971	1974	Retired
BN (SCA)	Chen Ko Ming	陈高明	Sarikei	1971	1974	Retired
SUPP	Khoo Peng Loong	邱炳农	Bandar Sibu	1971	1974	Retired
BN (SUPP)	Khoo Peng Loong	邱炳农	Bandar Sibu	1971	1974	Retired
SCA	Ting Ming Kiong	丁明建	Bintulu	1971	1974	Retired
BN (SCA)	Ting Ming Kiong	丁明建	Bintulu	1971	1974	Retired
SNAP	James Wong Kim Min	黄金明	Miri-Subis	1971	1974	Defeated
Alliance (MCA)	(Michael Chen Wing Sum)	曾永森	Ulu Selangor	1972	1982	Transferred
BN (MCA)	(Michael Chen Wing Sum)	曾永森	Ulu Selangor	1972	1982	Transferred
BN (Gerakan)	(Michael Chen Wing Sum)	曾永森	Ulu Selangor	1972	1982	Transferred
BN (Gerakan)	(Michael Chen Wing Sum)	曾永森	Bruas	1982	1986	Retired
BN (MCA)	Oo Gin Sun	余银山	Alor Setar	1974	1990	Retired
BN (MCA)	Lim Kiam Hoon	林建云	Padang Serai	1974	1982	Retired
BN (MCA)	Ling Liong Sik	林良实	Mata Kuching	1974	1986	Transferred
BN (MCA)	Ling Liong Sik	林良实	Labis	1986	2004	Transferred
BN (Gerakan)	Goh Cheng Teik	吴清德	Nibong Tebal	1974	1990	Not Contested
BN (MCA)	Albert Mah	马骐骝	Bukit Bendera	1974	1978	Retired
BN (Gerakan)	Paul Leong Khee Seong	梁棋祥	Taiping	1974	1990	Retired
DAP	Ngan Siong Hin	颜祥兴	Kinta	1978	1978	Retired
DAP	Chian Heng Kai	陈庆佳	Batu Gajah	1974	1982	Not Contested
BN (Gerakan)	Au How Cheong	欧效翔	Telok Anson	1974	1986	Retired
BN (MCA)	Mak Hon Kam	麦汉锦	Tanjong Malim	1974	1986	Retired
BN (MCA)	Lew Sip Hon	刘集汉	Shah Alam	1974	1986	Retired
DAP	Oh Keng Seng	胡更生	Petaling	1974	1978	Not Contested
DAP	Lee Lam Thye	李霖泰	Kuala Lumpur Bandar	1974	1986	Transferred
DAP	Lee Lam Thye	李霖泰	Bukit Bintang	1986	1990	Retired
DAP	Farn Seong Than	范相登	Sungei Besi	1974	1978	Retired
BN (MCA)	Lee Boon Peng	李文彬	Mantin	1974	1986	Retired
BN (MCA)	Chong Hon Nyan	张汉源	Batu Berendam	1974	1986	Retired
BN (MCA)	Neo Yee Pan	梁维泮	Muar	1974	1986	Retired
BN (MCA)	Chin Hon Ngian	陈汉源	Renggam	1974	1986	Retired
BN (MCA)	Loh Fook Yen	罗福元	Kluang	1974	1978	Defeated
BN (MCA)	Hee Tien Lai	许天来	Ayer Hitam	1974	1986	Retired
BN (SCA)	Peter Lim Pui Ho	林培河	Sandakan	1974	1978	Retired
BN (SCA)	Alex Pang Sui Chee	彭瑞麒	Tawau	1974	1978	Retired
BN (SUPP)	Chieng Tiong Kai	詹长开	Sarikei	1974	1982	Retired
BN (SUPP)	Wee Ho Soon	黄和顺	Bandar Sibu	1974	1978	Retired
SNAP	Ting Ling Kiew	陈联侨	Bintulu	1974	1990	Retired
BN (SNAP)	Ting Ling Kiew	陈联侨	Bintulu	1974	1990	Retired
BN (SUPP)	Yang Siew Siang	杨寿祥	Miri-Subis	1974	1978	Retired
BN (MCA)	Rosemary Chow Poh Kheng	周宝琼	Selayang	1975	1978	Transferred
BN (MCA)	Rosemary Chow Poh Kheng	周宝琼	Ulu Langat	1978	1986	Retired
DAP	Seow Hun Khim	萧汉钦	Bukit Mertajam	1978	1986	Retired
BN (MCA)	Seow Hun Khim	萧汉钦	Bukit Mertajam	1978	1986	Retired
DAP	Wong Hoong Keat	黄鸿杰	Tanjong	1978	1982	Retired
BN (MCA)	Wong Hoong Keat	黄鸿杰	Tanjong	1978	1982	Retired
BN (MCA)	Yang Choong Fu	杨忠富	Kinta	1978	1982	Retired
DAP	Ting Chek Ming	陈则明	Bruas	1978	1982	Not Contested
BN (MCA)	Tan Koon Swan	陈群川	Raub	1978	1982	Transferred
BN (MCA)	Tan Koon Swan	陈群川	Damansara	1982	1986	Retired
BN (MCA)	Tan Koon Swan	陈群川	Gopeng	1986	1987	Resigned
BN (Gerakan)	Tan Tiong Hong	陈忠鸿	Kepong	1978	1982	Transferred
BN (MCA)	Tan Tiong Hong	陈忠鸿	Raub	1982	1986	Retired
DAP	Chan Kok Kit	陈国杰	Sungei Besi	1978	1986	Retired
DAP	Chan Teck Chan	陈德泉	Kota Melaka	1978	1982	Defeated
DAP	Lee Kaw	李高	Kluang	1978	1982	Retired
BN (Berjaya)	William Lye Chee Hien	黎志贤	Gaya	1978	1986	Retired
DAP	Fung Ket Wing	冯杰荣	Sandakan	1978	1990	Retired
BN (Berjaya)	Hiew Nyuk Ying	丘玉荣	Tawau	1978	1986	Retired
BN (SUPP)	Wong Soon Kai	黄顺开	Sibu	1978	1982	Defeated
SAPO	Raymond Szetu Mei Thong	司徒美堂	Lambir	1978	1982	Retired
BN (MCA)	Tan Kok Hooi	陈国辉	Padang Serai	1982	1986	Retired
DAP	Gooi Hock Seng	魏福星	Bukit Bendera	1982	1995	Retired
BN (Gerakan)	Koh Tsu Koon	许子根	Tanjong	1982	1986	Defeated
BN (MCA)	Lim Liang Seng	林良成	Kinta	1982	1986	Retired
BN (MCA)	Peter Chin Gan Oon	陈仁安	Ipoh	1982	1986	Not Contested
BN (MCA)	Yew Foo Weng	游富荣	Menglembu	1982	1986	Retired
BN (MCA)	Ban Hon Keong	万汉强	Batu Gajah	1982	1986	Retired
BN (MCA)	Ng Cheng Kuai	黄秋贵	Lumut	1982	1990	Retired
BN (MCA)	Lee Kim Sai	李金狮	Ulu Selangor	1982	1986	Transferred
BN (MCA)	Lee Kim Sai	李金狮	Hulu Langat	1982	1995	Retired
BN (MCA)	Yeoh Poh San	杨宝山	Petaling	1982	1986	Retired
DAP	Tan Seng Giaw	陈胜尧	Kepong	1982	2018	Retired
BN (MCA)	Quah Wee Liam	柯威廉	Kluang	1982	1986	Retired
BN (Berjaya)	Kan Yau Fa	简耀华	Tawau	1982	1986	Retired
DAP	Sim Kuang Yang	沈观仰	Bandar Kuching	1982	1995	Retired
BN (SUPP)	Law Hieng Ding	刘贤镇	Sarikei	1982	2008	Retired
DAP	Ling Sie Ming	林世铭	Sibu	1982	1986	Defeated
BN (SUPP)	George Chan Hong Nam	陈康南	Lambir	1982	1986	Not contested
DAP	(Chen Man Hin)	曾敏兴	Seremban	1983	1990	Defeated
BN (MCA)	Chew Kam Hoy	周锦海	Padang Serai	1986	1990	Retired
DAP	Teoh Teik Huat	张德发	Bagan	1986	1990	Not Contested
DAP	(Chian Heng Kai)	陈庆佳	Kinta	1986	1995	Retired
DAP	Lau Dak Kee	刘德琦	Pasir Pinji	1986	1990	Transferred
DAP	Lau Dak Kee	刘德琦	Ipoh	1990	1995	Retired
DAP	(Ting Chek Ming)	陈则明	Batu Gajah	1986	1990	Retired
BN (Gerakan)	Lim Keng Yaik	林敬益	Beruas	1986	2008	Retired
DAP	Ngoi Thiam Woh	魏添凤	Kampar	1986	1990	Retired
BN (Gerakan)	Ong Tin Kim	王添庆	Teluk Intan	1986	1997	Death
BN (MCA)	Loke Yuen Yow	陆垠佑	Tanjong Malim	1986	2008	Retired
BN (MCA)	Wang Choon Wing	黄循营	Lipis	1986	1990	Retired
BN (MCA)	Teng Gaik Kwan	邓育桓	Raub	1986	1999	Retired
BN (MCA)	Lim Ann Koon	林安焜	Ampang Jaya	1986	1989	Resigned
DAP	Eng Seng Chai	黄生财	Petaling Jaya	1986	1990	Retired
BN (MCA)	Ng Cheng Kiat	黄俊杰	Klang	1986	1990	Retired
BN (Gerakan)	Alexander Lee Yu Lung	李裕隆	Batu	1986	1995	Retired
BN (MCA)	Tan Kok Hooi	陈国辉	Kinta	1986	1990	Retired
DAP	Liew Ah Kim	廖金华	Kinta	1986	1999	Defeated
DAP	Tan Kok Wai	陈国伟	Sungai Besi	1986	1995	Transferred
DAP	Tan Kok Wai	陈国伟	Cheras	1995		Serving
PH (DAP)	Tan Kok Wai	陈国伟	Cheras	1995		Serving
DAP	Hu Sepang	胡雪邦	Rasah	1986	1990	Defeated
BN (MCA)	Kok Wee Kiat	郭伟杰	Selandar	1986	1990	Retired
DAP	Lim Guan Eng	林冠英	Kota Melaka	1986	1999	Not Contested
BN (MCA)	Ling Chooi Sieng	林水仙	Kluang	1986	1990	Transferred
BN (MCA)	Ling Chooi Sieng	林水仙	Lumut	1990	1995	Retired
BN (MCA)	Chua Jui Meng	蔡锐明	Bakri	1986	2008	Not Contested
BN (MCA)	Woon See Chin	云时进	Senai	1986	1995	Retired
BN (MCA)	Law Lai Heng	吴来兴	Pontian	1986	1990	Retired
DAP	Gerard Math Lee Min	马理民	Gaya	1986	1990	Retired
DAP	Hsing Yin Shean	邢荣显	Tanjong Aru	1986	1990	Defeated
DAP	Samson Chin Chee Tsu	陈志慈	Tawau	1986	1990	Defeated
BN (SUPP)	Tiew Sung Seng	赵松胜	Sibu	1986	1990	Retired
BN (SUPP)	Peter Chin Fah Kui	陈华贵	Lambir	1986	1990	Transferred
BN (SUPP)	Peter Chin Fah Kui	陈华贵	Miri	1990	2013	Retired
BN (MCA)	Ting Chew Peh	陈祖排	Gopeng	1987	2008	Retired
BN (MCA)	Ong Tee Keat	翁诗杰	Ampang Jaya	1986	2004	Transferred
BN (MCA)	Ong Tee Keat	翁诗杰	Pandan	2004	2013	Retired
BN (MCA)	Lim Ah Lek	林亚礼	Bentong	1989	1999	Retired
BN (MCA)	Chor Chee Heung	曹智雄	Alor Setar	1990	2013	Defeated
BN (MCA)	Lim Lay Hoon	林丽云	Padang Serai	1990	1999	Retired
DAP	Lim Hock Seng	林峰成	Bagan	1990	1995	Not Contested
DAP	Lim Hock Seng	林峰成	Bagan	1995	2008	Not Contested
BN (Gerakan)	Kerk Choo Ting	郭洙镇	Taiping	1990	2004	Transferred
BN (Gerakan)	Kerk Choo Ting	郭洙镇	Simpang Renggam	2004	2008	Retired
BN (MCA)	Kerk Kim Hock	郭金福	Pasir Pinji	1990	1995	Defeated
DAP	Foo Piew Kok	符标国	Batu Gajah	1990	1995	Retired
DAP	James Wong Wing On	黄永安	Kampar	1990	1999	Retired
BN (MCA)	Chan Kong Choy	陈广才	Lipis	1990	1995	Transferred
BN (MCA)	Chan Kong Choy	陈广才	Selayang	1995	2008	Retired
DAP	Kua Kia Soong	柯嘉逊	Petaling Jaya	1990	1995	Retired
DAP	Fong Kui Lun	方贵伦	Klang	1990	1995	Defeated
DAP	Wee Choo Keong	黄朱强	Bukit Bintang	1990	1995	Disqualified
BN (MCA)	Yim Chee Chong	严慈忠	Seremban	1990	1995	Retired
BN (MCA)	Wong See Wah	黄思华	Rasah	1990	1999	Retired
BN (MCA)	Fong Chan Onn	冯镇安	Selandar	1990	2004	Transferred
BN (MCA)	Fong Chan Onn	冯镇安	Alor Gajah	2004	2013	Retired
BN (MCA)	Kang Chow Oh	江沼湖	Kluang	1990	1999	Retired
BN (MCA)	Ong Ka Ting	黄家定	Pontian	1990	2004	Transferred
BN (MCA)	Ong Ka Ting	黄家定	Tanjong Piai	2004	2008	Transferred
BN (MCA)	Ong Ka Ting	黄家定	Kulai	2008	2013	Retired
PBS	Lai Lun Tze	赖麟趾	Sandakan	1990	1995	Retired
PBS	Philip Yong Chiew Lip	杨秋立	Gaya	1990	1999	Retired
BN (SAPP)	Philip Yong Chiew Lip	杨秋立	Gaya	1990	1999	Retired
PBS	Joseph Voon Shin Choi	温新财	Tanjong Aru	1990	1995	Retired
PBS	Geoffrey Yee Ling Fook	余伦福	Tawau	1990	1995	Retired
BN (SUPP)	Yong Khoon Seng	杨昆贤	Padawan	1990	1999	Retired
BN (SUPP)	Yong Khoon Seng	杨昆贤	Stampin	1999	2013	Defeated
DAP	James Wong Sing Nang	黄新楠	Lanang	1990	1995	Defeated
BN (SUPP)	Robert Lau Hoi Chew	刘会洲	Sibu	1990	2010	Death
BN (SNAP)	James Wong Kim Min	黄金明	Bintulu	1990	1995	Defeated
BN (MCA)	Tan Chong Keng	陈从德	Bukit Mertajam	1995	1999	Defeated
BN (Gerakan)	(Goh Cheng Teik)	吴清德	Nibong Tebal	1995	1999	Retired
BN (Gerakan)	Chia Kwang Chye	谢宽泰	Bukit Bendera	1995	2008	Defeated
BN (MCA)	Wong Kam Hoong	黄锦鸿	Bayan Baru	1995	2008	Retired
BN (MCA)	Chang Kon You	郑光祖	Ipoh Timor	1995	1999	Retired
BN (MCA)	Ho Cheong Sing	何掌醒	Ipoh Barat	1995	1999	Defeated
BN (MCA)	Yeong Chee Wah	杨智华	Batu Gajah	1995	1999	Defeated
BN (MCA)	Hew See Tong	丘思东	Kampar	1995	2008	Retired
BN (MCA)	Yap Yit Thong	叶逸堂	Lumut	1995	1999	Retired
BN (MCA)	Fu Ah Kiow	胡亚桥	Mentakab	1995	2004	Transferred
BN (MCA)	Fu Ah Kiow	胡亚桥	Kuantan	2004	2008	Defeated
BN (MCA)	Vincent Lim Kuo Phau	林国豹	Petaling Jaya Utara	1995	1999	Retired
BN (MCA)	Donald Lim Siang Chai	林祥才	Petaling Jaya Selatan	1995	2008	Defeated
BN (MCA)	Yap Pian Hon	叶炳汉	Serdang	1995	2008	Retired
BN (MCA)	Tan Yee Kew	陈仪乔	Klang	1995	2008	Not Contested
BN (MCA)	Chong Chek Ah	庄智雅	Batu	1995	1999	Retired
IND	Chong Chek Ah	庄智雅	Batu	1995	1999	Retired
BN (MCA)	Tan Kee Kwong	陈记光	Segambut	1995	2008	Not Contested
BN (MCA)	Lee Chong Meng	李崇孟	Bukit Bintang	1995	1999	Defeated
BN (MCA)	Tan Chai Ho	陈财和	Bandar Tun Razak	1995	2008	Defeated
BN (MCA)	Hon Choon Kim	韩春锦	Seremban	1995	2008	Retired
BN (MCA)	Hoo Seong Chang	何襄赞	Kluang	1995	2008	Retired
BN (MCA)	Lim Si Cheng	林时清	Senai	1995	2004	Defeated
BN (MCA)	Lim Si Cheng	林时清	Kulai	2004	2008	Retired
BN (MCA)	Chang See Ten	张诗登	Gelang Patah	1995	2004	Retired
PBS	Yee Moh Chai	于墨斋	Tanjong Aru	1995	2004	Transferred
BN (PBS)	Yee Moh Chai	于墨斋	Kota Kinabalu	2004	2008	Not Contested
BN (LDP)	Lau Ngan Siew	刘彦修	Sandakan	1995	2004	Defeated
BN (SAPP)	Chua Soon Bui	蔡顺梅	Tawau	1995	1999	Not Contested
BN (SUPP)	Song Swee Guan	宋瑞源	Bandar Kuching	1995	2004	Retired
BN (PBDS)	Sng Chee Hua	孙志桦	Julau	1995	1999	Not Contested
BN (SUPP)	Tiong Thai King	张泰卿	Lanang	1995	2008	Defeated
DAP	Chiew Chiu Sing	周政新	Bintulu	1995	1999	Defeated
BN (MCA)	Lim Bee Kau	林美娇	Padang Serai	1999	2008	Retired
DAP	Chong Eng	章瑛	Bukit Mertajam	1999	2013	Not Contested
DAP	Goh Kheng Huat	吴庆发	Nibong Tebal	1999	2004	Retired
DAP	Chow Kon Yeow	曹觀友	Tanjong	1999	2013	Not Contested
BN (Gerakan)	Lee Kah Choon	李家全	Jelutong	1999	2008	Retired
BN (MCA)	Thong Fah Chong	汤华昌	Ipoh Timor	1999	2004	Defeated
DAP	Fong Po Kuan	冯宝君	Batu Gajah	1999	2013	Retired
BN (MCA)	Kong Cho Ha	江作汉	Lumut	1999	2013	Defeated
BN (Gerakan)	Mah Siew Keong	马袖强	Telok Intan	1999	2008	Defeated
BN (MCA)	Ng Yen Yen	黄燕燕	Raub	1999	2013	Retired
BN (MCA)	Liow Tiong Lai	廖中莱	Bentong	1999	2018	Defeated
BN (MCA)	Chew Mei Fun	周美芬	Petaling Jaya Utara	1999	2008	Defeated
BN (Gerakan)	Ng Lip Yong	吴立洋	Batu	1999	2008	Retired
DAP	Fong Kui Lun	方贵伦	Bukit Bintang	1999		Serving
PH (DAP)	Fong Kui Lun	方贵伦	Bukit Bintang	1999		Serving
DAP	Teresa Kok Suh Sim	郭素沁	Seputeh	1999		Serving
PH (DAP)	Teresa Kok Suh Sim	郭素沁	Seputeh	1999		Serving
BN (MCA)	Goh Siow Huat	吴绍阀	Rasah	1999	2008	Retired
DAP	(Kerk Kim Hock)	郭金福	Kota Melaka	1999	2004	Retired
BN (SAPP)	Yong Teck Lee	杨德利	Gaya	1999	2002	Disqualified
BN (SAPP)	Shim Paw Fatt	沈宝发	Tawau	1999	2004	Retired
BN (SPDP)	Tiong King Sing	张庆信	Bintulu	1999		Serving
BN (PDP)	Tiong King Sing	张庆信	Bintulu	1999		Serving
GPS (PDP)	Tiong King Sing	张庆信	Bintulu	1999		Serving
BN (SAPP)	Liew Teck Chan	刘德泉	Gaya	2002	2004	Not Contested
BN (Gerakan)	Huan Cheng Guan	范清渊	Batu Kawan	2004	2008	Not Contested
BN (Gerakan)	Tan Lian Hoe	陈莲花	Bukit Gantang	2004	2008	Transferred
BN (Gerakan)	Tan Lian Hoe	陈莲花	Gerik	2008	2013	Defeated
DAP	(Lim Kit Siang)	林吉祥	Ipoh Timor	2004	2013	Transferred
DAP	(Lim Kit Siang)	林吉祥	Gelang Patah	2013	2018	Transferred
PH (DAP)	(Lim Kit Siang)	林吉祥	Iskandar Puteri	2018	2022	Retired
BN (Gerakan)	Lau Yeng Peng	卢永平	Puchong	2004	2008	Defeated
BN (MCA)	Loh Seng Kok	卢诚国	Kelana Jaya	2004	2008	Defeated
BN (MCA)	Yew Teong Look	姚长禄	Wangsa Maju	2004	2008	Defeated
BN (MCA)	Wong Nai Chee	王乃志	Kota Melaka	2004	2008	Defeated
BN (MCA)	Chua Soi Lek	蔡细历	Labis	2004	2008	Retired
BN (MCA)	Wee Ka Siong	魏家祥	Ayer Hitam	2004		Serving
BN (MCA)	Teng Boon Soon	邓文村	Tebrau	2004	2013	Retired
BN (MCA)	Tan Ah Eng	陈亚英	Gelang Patah	2004	2013	Retired
BN (PBS)	Edmund Chong Ket Wah	蒋国华	Batu Sapi	2004	2010	Death
IND	Chong Hon Min	张汉明	Sandakan	2004	2008	Retired
DAP	Chong Chieng Jen	张健仁	Bandar Kuching	2004	2018	Serving
PH (DAP)	Chong Chieng Jen	张健仁	Stampin	2018		Serving
DAP	(Lim Guan Eng)	林冠英	Bagan	2008		Serving
PH (DAP)	(Lim Guan Eng)	林冠英	Bagan	2008		Serving
PKR	Tan Tee Beng	陈智铭	Nibong Tebal	2008	2013	Not Contested
IND	Tan Tee Beng	陈智铭	Nibong Tebal	2008	2013	Not Contested
DAP	Liew Chin Tong	刘镇东	Bukit Bendera	2008	2013	Transferred
DAP	Liew Chin Tong	刘镇东	Kluang	2013	2018	Defeated
DAP	Jeff Ooi Chuan Aun	黄泉安	Jelutong	2008	2018	Retired
DAP	Nga Kor Ming	倪可敏	Taiping	2008	2018	Transferred
PH (DAP)	Nga Kor Ming	倪可敏	Tekuk Intan	2018		Serving
DAP	Ngeh Koo Ham	倪可汉	Beruas	2008		Serving
PH (DAP)	Ngeh Koo Ham	倪可汉	Beruas	2008		Serving
BN (MCA)	Lee Chee Leong	李志亮	Kampar	2008	2013	Defeated
PKR	Lee Boon Chye	李文材	Gopeng	2008	2022	Not Contested
PH (PKR)	Lee Boon Chye	李文材	Gopeng	2008	2022	Not Contested
DAP	Seah Leong Peng	谢昂凭	Telok Intan	2013	2014	Death
BN (MCA)	Ong Ka Chuan	黄家泉	Tanjong Malim	2008	2018	Retired
PKR	William Leong Jee Keen	梁自坚	Selayang	2008		Serving
PH (PKR)	William Leong Jee Keen	梁自坚	Selayang	2008		Serving
DAP	Teo Nie Ching	张念群	Serdang	2008	2013	Transferred
DAP	Teo Nie Ching	张念群	Kulai	2013		Serving
PH (DAP)	Teo Nie Ching	张念群	Kulai	2013		Serving
PKR	Loh Gwo Burne	罗国本	Kelana Jaya	2008	2013	Retired
PKR	Hee Loy Sian	许来贤	Petaling Jaya Selatan	2008	2018	Not contested
DAP	Tony Pua Kiam Wee	潘俭伟	Petaling Jaya Utara	2008	2018	Transferred
PH (DAP)	Tony Pua Kiam Wee	潘俭伟	Damansara	2018	2022	Retired
PKR	Chua Tian Chang	蔡添强	Batu	2008	2018	Disqualified
PKR	(Wee Choo Keong)	黄朱强	Wangsa Maju	2008	2013	Retired
IND	(Wee Choo Keong)	黄朱强	Wangsa Maju	2008	2013	Retired
DAP	Lim Lip Eng	林立迎	Segambut	2008	2018	Transferred
PH (DAP)	Lim Lip Eng	林立迎	Kepong	2018		Serving
DAP	Loke Siew Fook	陆兆福	Rasah	2008	2013	Transferred
DAP	Loke Siew Fook	陆兆福	Seremban	2013		Serving
PH (DAP)	Loke Siew Fook	陆兆福	Seremban	2013		Serving
DAP	Sim Tong Him	沈同钦	Kota Melaka	2008	2018	Not Contested
IND	Sim Tong Him	沈同钦	Kota Melaka	2008	2018	Not Contested
BN (MCA)	Chua Tee Yong	蔡智勇	Labis	2008	2018	Defeated
DAP	Er Teck Hwa	余德华	Bakri	2008	2018	Retired
BN (Gerakan)	Liang Teck Meng	梁德明	Simpang Renggam	2008	2018	Defeated
BN (MCA)	Hou Kok Chung	何国忠	Kluang	2008	2013	Defeated
BN (MCA)	Wee Jeck Seng	黄日升	Tanjong Piai	2008	2018	Defeated
DAP	Hiew King Chew	邱庆洲	Kota Kinabalu	2008	2013	Not Contested
BN (LDP)	Liew Vui Keong	刘伟强	Sandakan	2008	2013	Defeated
BN (SAPP)	(Chua Soon Bui)	蔡顺梅	Tawau	2008	2013	Defeated
SAPP	(Chua Soon Bui)	蔡顺梅	Tawau	2008	2013	Defeated
BN (SUPP)	Ding Kuong Hiing	陈冠勋	Sarikei	2008	2013	Defeated
DAP	Wong Ho Leng	黄和联	Sibu	2010	2013	Retired
BN (PBS)	Linda Tsen Thau Lin	曾道玲	Batu Sapi	2010	2018	Defeated
PKR	Gooi Hsiao-Leung	魏晓隆	Alor Setar	2013	2018	Not Contested
DAP	Steven Sim Chee Keong	沈志强	Bujit Mertajam	2013		Serving
PH (DAP)	Steven Sim Chee Keong	沈志强	Bujit Mertajam	2013		Serving
DAP	Ng Wei Aik	黄伟益	Tanjong	2013	2018	Retired
PKR	Sim Tze Tzin	沈志勤	Bayan Baru	2013		Serving
PH (PKR)	Sim Tze Tzin	沈志勤	Bayan Baru	2013		Serving
DAP	Su Keong Siong	苏建祥	Ipoh Timor	2013	2018	Transferred
PH (DAP)	Su Keong Siong	苏建祥	Kampar	2018	2022	Not Contested
DAP	Ko Chung Sen	许崇信	Kampar	2013	2018	Not Contested
DAP	Ong Kian Ming	王建民	Serdang	2013	2018	Transferred
PH (DAP)	Ong Kian Ming	王建民	Bangi	2018	2022	Retired
PKR	Wong Chen	黄基全	Kelana Jaya	2013	2018	Transferred
PH (PKR)	Wong Chen	黄基全	Subang	2018	2026	Resigned
PKR	(Tan Kee Kwong)	陈记光	Wangsa Maju	2013	2018	Retired
DAP	Teo Kok Seong	张聒翔	Rasah	2013	2018	Not Contested
BN (MCA)	Koh Nai Kwong	古乃光	Alor Gajah	2013	2018	Not Contested
BN (MCA)	Khoo Soo Seang	邱思祥	Tebrau	2013	2018	Retired
DAP	Jimmy Wong Sze Phin	黄仕平	Kota Kinabalu	2013	2018	Not Contested
DAP	Wong Tien Fatt	黄天发	Sandakan	2013	2019	Death
PH (DAP)	Wong Tien Fatt	黄天发	Sandakan	2013	2019	Death
BN (PBS)	Mary Yap Kain Ching	叶娟呈	Tawau	2013	2018	Defeated
DAP	Julian Tan Kok Ping	陈国彬	Stampin	2013	2018	Not Contested
DAP	Wong Ling Biu	黄灵彪	Sarikei	2013	2022	Retired
PH (DAP)	Wong Ling Biu	黄灵彪	Sarikei	2013	2022	Retired
DAP	Alice Lau Kiong Yieng	刘强燕	Lanang	2013		Serving
PH (DAP)	Alice Lau Kiong Yieng	刘强燕	Lanang	2013		Serving
DAP	Oscar Ling Chai Yew	林财耀	Sibu	2013		Serving
PH (DAP)	Oscar Ling Chai Yew	林财耀	Sibu	2013		Serving
PKR	Michael Teo Yu Keng	张有庆	Miri	2013	2022	Not contested
PH (PKR)	Michael Teo Yu Keng	张有庆	Miri	2013	2022	Not contested
BN (Gerakan)	(Mah Siew Keong)	马袖强	Telok Intan	2014	2018	Defeated
PH (PKR)	Chan Ming Kai	曾敏凯	Alor Setar	2018	2022	Not Contested
PH (DAP)	Wong Hon Wai	黄汉伟	Bukit Bendera	2018	2022	Not Contested
PH (DAP)	(Chow Kon Yeow)	曹观友	Tanjong	2018	2022	Transferred
PH (DAP)	(Chow Kon Yeow)	曹观友	Batu Kawan	2022		Serving
PH (DAP)	Teh Kok Lim	郑国霖	Taiping	2018	2022	Not Contested
PH (DAP)	Wong Kah Woh	黄家和	Ipoh Timor	2018	2022	Transferred
PH (DAP)	Wong Kah Woh	黄家和	Taiping	2022		Serving
PH (PKR)	Chang Lih Kang	郑立慷	Tanjong Malim	2018		Serving
PH (DAP)	Wong Tack	黄德	Bentong	2018	2022	Defeated
PH (PKR)	June Leow Hsiad Hui	廖书慧	Hulu Selangor	2018	2022	Not Contested
PH (PKR)	Maria Chin Abdullah	玛丽亚陈	Petaling Jaya	2018	2022	Not Contested
PH (PKR)	(Tan Yee Kew)	陈仪乔	Wangsa Maju	2018	2022	Retired
PH (DAP)	Hannah Yeoh Tseow Suan	杨巧双	Segambut	2018		Serving
PH (DAP)	Cha Kee Chin	谢琪清	Rasah	2018		Serving
PH (DAP)	Khoo Poay Tiong	邱培栋	Kota Melaka	2018		Serving
PH (DAP)	Pang Hok Liong	彭学良	Labis	2018		Serving
PH (DAP)	Yeo Bee Yin	杨美盈	Bakri	2018	2022	Transferred
PH (DAP)	Yeo Bee Yin	杨美盈	Puchong	2022		Serving
PH (DAP)	Wong Shu Qi	王书琪	Kluang	2018		Serving
PH (PKR)	Steven Choong Shiau Yoon	锺少云	Tebrau	2018	2022	Not Contested
PBM	Steven Choong Shiau Yoon	锺少云	Tebrau	2018	2022	Not Contested
PH (DAP)	Chan Foong Hin	陈泓缣	Kota Kinabalu	2018		Serving
WARISAN	(Liew Vui Keong)	刘伟强	Batu Sapi	2018	2020	Death
PH (PKR)	Christina Liew Chin Jin	刘静芝	Tawau	2018	2022	Defeated
PH (DAP)	Kelvin Yii Lee Wuen	俞利文	Bandar Kuching	2018		Serving
IND	Larry Sng Wei Shien	孙伟瑄	Julau	2018		Serving
PH (PKR)	Larry Sng Wei Shien	孙伟瑄	Julau	2018		Serving
PBM	Larry Sng Wei Shien	孙伟瑄	Julau	2018		Serving
PH (DAP)	Vivian Wong Shir Yee	黄诗怡	Sandakan	2019		Serving
BN (MCA)	(Wee Jeck Seng)	黄日升	Tanjong Piai	2019		serving
PH (DAP)	Lim Hui Ying	林慧英	Tanjong	2022		Serving
PH (DAP)	Howard Lee Chuan How	李存孝	Ipoh Timor	2022		Serving
PH (DAP)	Chong Zhemin	张哲敏	Kampar	2022		Serving
PH (PKR)	Tan Kar Hing	陈家兴	Gopeng	2022		Serving
PH (DAP)	Chow Yu Hui	邹宇晖	Raub	2022		Serving
PH (PKR)	Lee Chean Chung	李健聪	Petaling Jaya	2022	2026	Resigned
PH (DAP)	Tan Hong Pin	陈泓宾	Bakri	2022		Serving
PH (PKR)	Jimmy Puah Wee Tse	潘伟斯	Tebrau	2022		Serving
PH (DAP)	(Liew Chin Tong)	刘镇东	Iskandar Puteri	2022		Serving
GRS (PBS)	Lo Su Fui	罗思辉	Tawau	2022		Serving
GPS (SUPP)	Huang Tiong Sii	范长锡	Sarikei	2022		Serving
PH (PKR)	Chiew Choon Man	赵俊文	Miri	2022		Serving

== Number of ethnic Chinese in the Dewan Rakyat ==
Parliament	Number of ethnic Chinese members	Percentage of ethnic Chinese members	Total members (including other ethnic)
1st	29	27.88%	104
1st (after 1963)	52	32.70%	159
2nd	54	33.96%	159
2nd (after 1965)	43	29.86%	144
3rd	38	26.39%	144
4th	38	24.67%	154
5th	41	26.62%	154
6th	43	27.92%	154
7th	47	26.55%	177
8th	48	26.67%	180
9th	55	28.65%	192
9th (after 1997)	54	28.13%	192
10th	57	29.53%	193
11th	61	27.85%	219
12th	53	23.87%	222
13th	49	22.07%	222
14th	48	21.62%	222
14th (after 2019)	49	22.07%	222
14th (after 2020)	48	21.62%	222
15th	44	19.82%	222
15th (after 2026)	43	19.37%	222
