= Chin Su Phin =

Malaysian politician

Yang Berbahagia Datuk Chin Su Phin PGDK
- 陈树平

President of Liberal Democratic Party of Sabah
- Incumbent
- Assumed office 2018
- Preceded by: Teo Chee Kang

Member of Dewan Negara

Appointed by Yang di-Pertuan Agong
- In office 2011–2014

Personal details
- Born: Chin Su Phin; 8 August 1958 (age 67) Crown Colony of North Borneo
- Citizenship: Malaysian
- Party: LDP (since 1999)
- Other political affiliations: Barisan Nasional (1999-2018); Gabungan Rakyat Sabah (member since 2023)
- Occupation: Politician

Chin Su Phin (Chinese: 陳樹平; pinyin: Chén Shùpíng; Jyutping: Can4 Syu6 Ping4; Pe̍h-ōe-jī: Tân Chhiū-pêng; Pha̍k-fa-sṳ: Chhìn Su-phìn) is a Malaysian politician from Liberal Democratic Party of the State of Sabah. He has been the President of LDP Sabah since 2018. He was also a Member of Dewan Negara from 2011 to 2014.

== Election result ==
Sabah State Legislative Assembly
Year	Constituency	Candidate	Votes	Pct.	Opponent(s)	Votes	Pct.	Ballots cast	Majority	Turnout
2020	N20 Api-Api	Chin Su Phin (LDP)	317	2.67%	Christina Liew (PKR)	7,796	65.71%	11,865	5,347	61.96%
2020	N20 Api-Api	Chin Su Phin (LDP)	317	2.67%	Yee Moh Chai (PBS)	2,449	20.64%	11,865	5,347	61.96%
2020	N20 Api-Api	Chin Su Phin (LDP)	317	2.67%	Pang Yuk Ming (PCS)	431	3.63%	11,865	5,347	61.96%
2020	N20 Api-Api	Chin Su Phin (LDP)	317	2.67%	Lo Yau Foh (PPRS)	280	2.36%	11,865	5,347	61.96%
2020	N20 Api-Api	Chin Su Phin (LDP)	317	2.67%	Chong Tze Kiun (PGRS)	97	0.82%	11,865	5,347	61.96%
2020	N20 Api-Api	Chin Su Phin (LDP)	317	2.67%	Sim Sie Hong (IND)	72	0.61%	11,865	5,347	61.96%
2020	N20 Api-Api	Chin Su Phin (LDP)	317	2.67%	Ng Chun Sua (IND)	41	0.34%	11,865	5,347	61.96%
2020	N20 Api-Api	Chin Su Phin (LDP)	317	2.67%	Marcel Jude (IND)	16	0.13%	11,865	5,347	61.96%

== Honours ==
- Sabah
  - Commander of the Order of Kinabalu (PGDK) – Datuk (2005)
