= Bandar Sibu =

Sarawak constituency

Defunct federal constituency
- Legislature: Dewan Rakyat
- Constituency created: 1968
- Constituency abolished: 1978
- First contested: 1969
- Last contested: 1974

Bandar Sibu was a federal constituency in Sarawak, Malaysia, that was represented in the Dewan Rakyat from 1971 to 1978.

The federal constituency was created in the 1968 redistribution and was mandated to return a single member to the Dewan Rakyat under the first past the post voting system.

== History ==
It was abolished in 1978 when it was redistributed.

=== Representation history ===
Members of Parliament for Bandar Sibu
Parliament	No	Years	Member	Party	Vote Share
Constituency created
		1969-1971	Parliament was suspended		
3rd	P134	1971-1973	Khoo Peng Loong (邱炳农)	SUPP	7,655; 57.37%
3rd	P134	1973-1974	Khoo Peng Loong (邱炳农)	BN (SUPP)	7,655; 57.37%
4th	P144	1974-1978	Wee Ho Soon (黄和顺)	BN (SUPP)	6,861; 54.49%
Constituency abolished, renamed to Sibu

=== State constituency ===
Parliamentary constituency	State constituency					
Parliamentary constituency	1969–1978	1978–1990	1990–1999	1999–2008	2008–2016	2016−present
Bandar Sibu	Sibu Luar					
Bandar Sibu	Sibu Tengah					

=== Historical boundaries ===
State Constituency	Area
State Constituency	1968
Sibu Luar	Kampung Hilir; Nangka; Permai Jaya; Sibu; Sungai Maaw
Sibu Tengah	Bukit Assek; Li Hua; Maling; Salim; Sibu

== Election results ==
Malaysian general election, 1974: Bandar Sibu
Party	Candidate	Votes	%	∆%
BN	Wee Ho Soon	6,861	54.49	▲54.49
SNAP	Joseph Tang Cheok Chung	5,730	45.51	▲36.43
Total valid votes		12,591	100.00	
Total rejected ballots		564		
Unreturned ballots		0		
Turnout		13,155	67.11	▼8.62
Registered electors		19,601		
Majority		1,131	8.98	▼21.71
BN gain from SUPP		Swing		?

Malaysian general election, 1969: Bandar Sibu
Party	Candidate	Votes	%
SUPP	Khoo Peng Loong	7,655	57.37
SCA	Ting Tieng Tong	3,560	26.68
SNAP	Joseph Tang Cheok Chung	1,212	9.08
Independent	Lim Ung Chiew	519	3.89
Independent	Peter Hwang	398	2.98
Total valid votes		13,344	100.00
Total rejected ballots		877	
Unreturned ballots			
Turnout		14,221	75.73
Registered electors		18,779	
Majority		4,095	30.69
This was a new constituency created.
