= Members of the Dewan Rakyat, 3rd Malaysian Parliament =

Malaysian federal legislators, 1971–1974

3rd Parliament of Malaysia
←	2nd Parliament	4th Parliament	→

Overview
- Legislative body: Parliament of Malaysia
- Jurisdiction: Malaysia
- Meeting place: Malaysian Houses of Parliament
- Term: 20 February 1971 – 31 July 1974
- Election: 1969 general election
- Government: First Razak cabinet
- Website: www.parlimen.gov.my

Dewan Rakyat
- Members: 144
- Speaker: Chik Mohamed Yusuf Sheikh Abdul Rahman
- Deputy Speaker: Nik Ahmad Kamil Nik Mahmud
- Secretary: Ahmad Abdullah (until 1972); Azizul Rahman Abdul Aziz
- Prime Minister: Abdul Razak Hussein
- Leader of the Opposition: Asri Muda (until 17 April 1973); Lim Kit Siang
- Party control: Alliance (until 1973); Barisan Nasional

Sovereign
- Yang di-Pertuan Agong: Tuanku Abdul Halim Muadzam Shah

Sessions
- 1st: 20 February 1971 – 11 February 1972
- 2nd: 9 May 1972 – 31 January 1973
- 3rd: 17 April 1973 – 21 January 1974
- 4th: 15 April 1974 – 26 July 1974

This is a list of the members of the Dewan Rakyat (House of Representatives) of the 3rd Parliament of Malaysia, elected in 1969. From 1969 to 1971, the National Operations Council governed the country in lieu of the elected government. In 1971, the NOC was dissolved with the restoration of Third Parliament of Malaysia.

== Composition ==
State	# of Seats	UMNO Seats	MCA Seats	MIC Seats	PMIP Seats	DAP Seats	Gerakan Seats	PPP Seats	Ra'ayat Seats	UMCO Seats	USNO Seats	SCA Seats	SCA & BUMIPUTERA Seats	PESAKA Seats	SNAP Seats	SUPP Seats	IND Seats
Perlis	2	2															
Kedah	12	7	2		3												
Kelantan	10	4			6												
Trengganu	6	4			2												
Penang	8	1	1			1	5										
Perak	20	7	1	1	1	5	1	4									
Pahang	6	5	1														
Selangor	14	6	2	1		3	2										
Negri Sembilan	6	3				3											
Malacca	4	2	1			1											
Johore	16	11	5														
Sabah	16										13	3					
Sarawak	24												7	2	9	5	1
Seats won	144	52	13	2	12	13	8	4	0	0	13	3	7	2	9	5	1
Seats contested	337	68	33	3	62	24	14	6	0	3	13	3	13	15	23	19	32

== Elected members by state ==
Shortcut:

Perlis | Kedah | Kelantan | Terengganu | Pulau Pinang | Perak | Pahang | Selangor | Negeri Sembilan | Melaka | Johor | Sabah | Sarawak

Unless noted otherwise, the MPs served the entire term of the parliament (from 20 February 1971 until 31 July 1974).

=== Perlis ===
No.	Federal Constituency	Member	Party
Alliance 2
P001	Perlis Utara	Othman Abdullah	Alliance (UMNO)
P002	Perlis Selatan	Mokhtar Ismail	Alliance (UMNO)

=== Kedah ===
No.	Federal Constituency	Member	Party
Alliance 9 | PAS 3
P003	Jitra-Padang Terap	Fatimah Hashim	Alliance (UMNO)
P004	Kubang Pasu Barat	Abu Bakar Umar	PMIP
P005	Kota Star Utara	Mawardi Lebai Teh	PMIP
P006	Alor Star	Lim Pee Hung	Alliance (MCA)
P007	Kuala Kedah	Senu Abdul Rahman from 20 January 1973 (Note: Senu was elected to Parliament in the Kuala Kedah by-election, 1973 after the resignation of Tunku Abdul Rahman.)	Alliance (UMNO)
P007	Kuala Kedah	Tunku Abdul Rahman until 8 December 1972	Alliance (UMNO)
P008	Kota Star Selatan	Yusof Rawa	PMIP
P009	Kedah Tengah	Khir Johari	Alliance (UMNO)
P010	Jerai	Hanafiah Hussain	Alliance (UMNO)
P011	Baling	Shafie Abdullah	Alliance (UMNO)
P012	Sungei Patani	Azahari Md. Taib	Alliance (UMNO)
P013	Kulim Utara	Bibi Aishah Hamid Don	Alliance (UMNO)
P014	Kulim-Bandar Bahru	Tai Kuan Yang	Alliance (MCA)

=== Kelantan ===
No.	Federal Constituency	Member	Party
PAS 6 | Alliance 4
P015	Tumpat	Abdul Aziz Omar	Alliance (UMNO)
P016	Kelantan Hilir	Nik Abdul Aziz Nik Mat	PMIP
P017	Pasir Mas Hilir	Muhammad Fakhruddin Abdullah	PMIP
P018	Kota Bharu Hilir	Tengku Ahmad Rithauddeen Tengku Ismail	Alliance (UMNO)
P019	Bachok	Mohd. Zain Abdullah	PMIP
P020	Kota Bharu Hulu	Mohamad Asri Muda	PMIP
P021	Pasir Mas Hulu	Tengku Zaid Tengku Ahmad	PMIP
P022	Pasir Puteh	Wan Sulaiman Ibrahim	PMIP
P023	Tanah Merah	Mohamed Yaacob	Alliance (UMNO)
P024	Ulu Kelantan	Nik Ahmad Kamil Nik Mahmud (Deputy Speaker)	Alliance (UMNO)

=== Trengganu ===
No.	Federal Constituency	Member	Party
Alliance 4 | PMIP 2
P025	Besut	Hussain Sulaiman	Alliance (UMNO)
P026	Kuala Trengganu Utara	Wan Abdul Kadir Ismail	Alliance (UMNO)
P027	Kuala Trengganu Selatan	Mohd. Daud Abdul Samad	PMIP
P028	Dungun	Abdul Wahab Yunus	PMIP
P029	Kemaman	Wan Mokhtar Ahmad	Alliance (UMNO)
P030	Trengganu Tengah	Engku Muhsein Abdul Kadir	Alliance (UMNO)

=== Penang ===
No.	Federal Constituency	Member	Party
GERAKAN 5 | Alliance 2 | DAP 1
P031	Bagan	Tan Cheng Bee	Alliance (MCA)
P032	Seberang Tengah	Mustapha Hussain	GERAKAN
P033	Seberang Selatan	Veerappen Veerathan	GERAKAN
P034	Penang Utara	Peter Paul Dason	DAP
P035	Penang Selatan	Thomas Gabriel Selvaraj	GERAKAN
P036	Tanjong	Lim Chong Eu	GERAKAN
P037	Dato' Kramat	V. David	GERAKAN
P038	Seberang Utara	Ahmad Saaid	Alliance (UMNO)

=== Perak ===
No.	Federal Constituency	Member	Party
Alliance 9 | DAP 5 | PPP 4 | Gerakan 1 | PMIP 1
P039	Ulu Perak	Mohamed Nor Mohd Dahan	Alliance (UMNO)
P040	Krian Laut	Sulaiman Taib	Alliance (UMNO)
P041	Krian Darat	Ramli Omar	Alliance (UMNO)
P042	Larut Utara	Tajudin Ali	Alliance (UMNO)
P043	Larut Selatan	Ng Hoe Hun	GERAKAN
P044	Bruas	Su Liang Yu	PPP
P045	Sitiawan	Richard Ho Ung Hun	DAP
P046	Sungei Siput	V. T. Sambanthan	Alliance (MIC)
P047	Kuala Kangsar	Mohamed Ghazali Jawi	Alliance (UMNO)
P048	Parit	Hashim Gera	PMIP
P049	Ulu Kinta	Chan Yoon Onn	PPP
P050	Ipoh	R. C. Mahadeva Rayan	PPP
P051	Menglembu	S. P. Seenivasagam	PPP
P052	Batu Gajah	Lim Cho Hock	DAP
P053	Kampar	Fan Yew Teng	DAP
P054	Hilir Perak	Ahmad Damanhuri Abdul Wahab	Alliance (UMNO)
P055	Telok Anson	Chan Fu King	DAP
P056	Bagan Datoh	Sulaiman Bulon	Alliance (UMNO)
P057	Batang Padang	Loh Jee Mee	DAP
P058	Tanjong Malim	Lee Seck Fun	Alliance (MCA)

=== Pahang ===
No.	Federal Constituency	Member	Party
Alliance 6
P059	Raub	Hamzah Abu Samah	Alliance (UMNO)
P060	Bentong	Chan Siang Sun	Alliance (MCA)
P061	Kuantan	Mohamed Taib	Alliance (UMNO)
P062	Pekan	Abdul Razak Hussein	Alliance (UMNO)
P063	Temerloh	Mohamed Yusof Mahmud	Alliance (UMNO)
P064	Lipis	Ghazali Shafie from 8 April 1972 (Note: Ghazali was elected to Parliament in the Lipis by-election, 1972 after the resignation of Abdul Razak Hussin.)	Alliance (UMNO)
P064	Lipis	Abdul Razak Hussin until 1972	Alliance (UMNO)

=== Selangor ===
No.	Federal Constituency	Member	Party
Alliance 9 | DAP 3 | GERAKAN 2
P065	Kuala Selangor	Raja Nong Chik Raja Ishak	Alliance (UMNO)
P066	Batu	Tan Chee Khoon	GERAKAN
P067	Kapar	Mohd. Tahir Abdul Manan from 3 April 1971 (Note: Mohd. Tahir was elected to Parliament in the Kapar by-election, 1971 after the death of Hamzah Alang.)	Alliance (UMNO)
P067	Kapar	Hamzah Alang until 1 March 1970	Alliance (UMNO)
P068	Rawang	Tunku Abdullah Tuanku Abdul Rahman	Alliance (UMNO)
P069	Langat	Shariff Ahmad	Alliance (UMNO)
P070	Setapak	Walter Loh Poh Khan	DAP
P071	Bangsar	Goh Hock Guan	DAP
P072	Bukit Bintang	Yeoh Teck Chye	GERAKAN
P073	Damansara	Hor Cheok Foon	DAP
P074	Klang	V. Manickavasagam	Alliance (MIC)
P075	Kuala Langat	Mohd. Tahir Abdul Majid	Alliance (UMNO)
P076	Sepang	Lee Siok Yew	Alliance (MCA)
P077	Sabak Bernam	Mustapha Abdul Jabar	Alliance (UMNO)
P078	Ulu Selangor	Michael Chen Wing Sum from 3 June 1972 (Note: Chen was elected to Parliament in the Ulu Selangor by-election, 1972 after the death of Khaw Kai Boh.)	Alliance (MCA)
P078	Ulu Selangor	Khaw Kai Boh until 15 April 1972	Alliance (MCA)

=== Negri Sembilan ===
No.	Federal Constituency	Member	Party
Alliance 3 | DAP 3
P079	Kuala Pilah	Abdul Samad Idris	Alliance (UMNO)
P080	Seremban Timor	Chen Man Hin	DAP
P081	Rembau-Tampin	Mokhtar Hashim from 8 July 1972 (Note: Mokhtar was elected to Parliament in the Rembau-Tampin by-election, 1972 after the death of Sulaiman Mohamed Attas.)	Alliance (UMNO)
P081	Rembau-Tampin	Sulaiman Mohamed Attas until 9 May 1972	Alliance (UMNO)
P082	Port Dickson	Soorian Arjunan	DAP
P083	Jelebu-Jempol	Mohamed Ujang	Alliance (UMNO)
P084	Seremban Barat	Sinnathamby Seevaratnam	DAP

=== Malacca ===
No.	Federal Constituency	Member	Party
Alliance 3 | DAP 1
P085	Malacca Tengah	Tan Siew Sin	Alliance (MCA)
P086	Bandar Malacca	Lim Kit Siang	DAP
P087	Malacca Utara	Abdul Ghafar Baba	Alliance (UMNO)
P088	Malacca Selatan	Ahmad Ithnin from 30 January 1971 (Note: Ahmad was elected to Parliament in the Malacca Selatan by-election, 1971. Election for Malacca Selatan federal constituency and another 40 federal constituencies in Sabah and Sarawak were postponed from the scheduled date, 10 May 1969.)	Alliance (UMNO)

=== Johore ===
No.	Federal Constituency	Member	Party
Alliance 16
P089	Muar Dalam	Syed Nasir Ismail	Alliance (UMNO)
P090	Segamat Selatan	Lee San Choon	Alliance (MCA)
P091	Muar Pantai	Seah Teng Ngiab	Alliance (MCA)
P092	Muar Selatan	Awang Hassan	Alliance (UMNO)
P093	Batu Pahat	Soh Ah Teck	Alliance (MCA)
P094	Batu Pahat Dalam	Fatimah Abdul Majid	Alliance (UMNO)
P095	Kluang Utara	Tiah Eng Bee	Alliance (MCA)
P096	Johore Tenggara	Syed Jaafar Albar	Alliance (UMNO)
P097	Pontian Utara	Sardon Jubir	Alliance (UMNO)
P098	Pontian Selatan	Ali Ahmad	Alliance (UMNO)
P099	Kluang Selatan	Chu Chee Peng	Alliance (MCA)
P100	Johore Bahru Timor	Hussein Onn	Alliance (UMNO)
P101	Johore Bahru Barat	Mohamed Rahmat	Alliance (UMNO)
P102	Johore Timor	Abdul Rahman Sabri from 8 September 1973 (Note: Abdul Rahman was elected to Parliament in the Johore Timor by-election, 1973 after the death of Ismail Abdul Rahman.)	Alliance (UMNO)
P102	Johore Timor	Ismail Abdul Rahman until 2 August 1973	Alliance (UMNO)
P103	Segamat Utara	Musa Hitam	Alliance (UMNO)
P104	Muar Utara	Ahmad Arshad	Alliance (UMNO)

=== Sabah ===
No.	Federal Constituency	Member	Party
USNO 13 | SCA 3
P105	Marudu	Mustapha Harun	Sabah Alliance (USNO)
P106	Bandau	Baudi Unggut	Sabah Alliance (USNO)
P107	Kota Belud	Mohamad Said Keruak	Sabah Alliance (USNO)'
P108	Tuaran	Buja Gumbilai	Sabah Alliance (USNO)
P109	Kota Kinabalu	Pang Tet Tshung	Sabah Alliance (SCA)
P110	Penampang	James Stephen Tibok	Sabah Alliance (USNO)
P111	Kimanis	Pengiran Tahir Pengiran Petra	Sabah Alliance (USNO)
P112	Labuan-Beaufort	Chik Johari Ondu Majakil	Sabah Alliance (USNO)
P113	Sabah Dalam	Mohamed Arif Salleh	Sabah Alliance (USNO)
P114	Sabah Selatan	Abdul Rashid Jais	Sabah Alliance (USNO)
P115	Kinabalu	Abdul Ghani Gilong	Sabah Alliance (USNO)
P116	Sandakan	Peter Lo Sui Yin	Sabah Alliance (SCA)
P117	Labuk-Sugut	Ajad Oyung	Sabah Alliance (USNO)
P118	Kinabatangan	Pengiran Ahmad Pengiran Indar	Sabah Alliance (USNO)
P119	Darvel	Mohd. Salleh Abdullah	Sabah Alliance (USNO)
P120	Tawau	Yeh Pao Tzu	Sabah Alliance (SCA)

=== Sarawak ===
No.	Federal Constituency	Member	Party
SNAP 9 | BUMIPUTERA 5 | SUPP 5 | PESAKA 2 | SCA 2 | IND 1
P121	Bau-Lundu	Joseph Valentine Cotter from 14 October 1971 (Note: Cotter was elected to Parliament in the Bau-Lundu by-election, 1971 after the resignation of Sinyium Mutit.)	SUPP
P121	Bau-Lundu	Sinyium Mutit until 3 August 1971	SUPP
P122	Bandar Kuching	Ong Kee Hui	SUPP
P123	Santubong	Awang Wal Awang Abu	Sarawak Alliance (BUMIPUTERA)
P124	Samarahan	Abdul Taib Mahmud	Sarawak Alliance (BUMIPUTERA)
P125	Padawan	Stephen Yong Kuet Tze	SUPP
P126	Serian	Rahun Debak	SNAP
P127	Simunjan	Bojeng Andot	Sarawak Alliance (BUMIPUTERA)
P128	Batang Lupar	Edwin Tangkun	SNAP
P129	Lubok Antu	Jonathan Narwin Jinggong	SNAP
P130	Betong	Andrew Mara Walter Unjah	SNAP
P131	Saratok	Edmund Langgu Saga	SNAP
P132	Sarikei	Chen Ko Ming	Sarawak Alliance (SCA)
P133	Payang	Abdul Rahman Ya'kub	Sarawak Alliance (BUMIPUTERA)
P134	Bandar Sibu	Khoo Peng Loong	SUPP
P135	Rajang	Jawan Empaling from 12 January 1974 (Note: Jawan was elected to Parliament in the Rajang by-election, 1974 after the death of Tibouh Rantai.)	SUPP
P135	Rajang	Tibuoh Rantai until 1973	SUPP
P136	Mukah	Latip Idris	Sarawak Alliance (BUMIPUTERA)
P137	Julau	Banyang Janting	PESAKA
P138	Kanowit	Joseph Unting Umang	IND
P139	Kapit	Abit Angkin	SNAP
P140	Ulu Rajang	Jugah Barieng	PESAKA
P141	Bintulu	Ting Ming Kiong	Sarawak Alliance (SCA)
P142	Miri-Subis	James Wong Kim Min	SNAP
P143	Baram	Luhat Wan	SNAP
P144	Limbang-Lawas	Awang Bungsu Abdullah	SNAP
