= Tanjong Aru (federal constituency) =

Sabah constituency

Defunct federal constituency
- Legislature: Dewan Rakyat
- Constituency created: 1984
- Constituency abolished: 2004
- First contested: 1986
- Last contested: 1999

Tanjong Aru was a federal constituency in Sabah, Malaysia, that was represented in the Dewan Rakyat from 1986 to 2004.

The federal constituency was created in the 1984 redistribution and was mandated to return a single member to the Dewan Rakyat under the first past the post voting system.

== History ==
It was abolished in 2004 when it was redistributed.

=== Representation history ===
Members of Parliament for Tanjong Aru
Parliament	No	Years	Member	Party	Vote Share
Constituency created from Gaya
7th	P145	1986-1990	Hsing Yin Shean (刑荣显)	DAP	5,981; 54.27%
8th	P145	1990-1995	Joseph Voon Shin Choi (温新财)	GR (PBS)	8,504; 51.55%
9th	P151	1995-1999	Yee Moh Chai (于墨斋)	GR (PBS)	10,306; 44.35%
10th	P151	1999-2004	Yee Moh Chai (于墨斋)	PBS	11,826; 50.02%
Constituency abolished, split into Penampang, Sepanggar, Kota Kinabalu and Putatan

=== State constituency ===
Parliamentary constituency	State constituency					
Parliamentary constituency	1967–1974	1974–1985	1985–1995	1995–2004	2004–2020	2020–present
Tanjong Aru				Api-Api		
Tanjong Aru			Petagas			
Tanjong Aru			Sembulan			

=== Historical boundaries ===
State Constituency	Area	
State Constituency	1984	1994
Api-Api		Api-Api; Bundusan; Damai; Kota Kinabalu; Luyang
Petagas	Kepayan; Lido; Lintas; Putatan Rampayan; Taman Deluxe	
Sembulan	Kopungit; Taman Kepayan Ridge; Tanjung Aru; Selunsung; Sembulan	Kampung Nosoob Baru; Kepayan; Petagas; Tanjung Aru; Sembulan

== Election results ==
Malaysian general election, 1999
Party	Candidate	Votes	%	∆%
PBS	Yee Moh Chai	11,826	50.02	▲5.67
BN	Philip Yong Chiew Lip	11,281	47.72	▲9.90
DAP	Oh Choo Hong	534	2.26	▼15.57
Total valid votes		23,641	100.00	
Total rejected ballots		111		
Unreturned ballots		275		
Turnout		24,027	58.01	▼6.95
Registered electors		41,414		
Majority		545	2.30	▼4.23
PBS hold		Swing		

Malaysian general election, 1995
Party	Candidate	Votes	%	∆%
PBS	Yee Moh Chai	10,306	44.35	▼7.20
BN	Joseph Voon Shin Choi	8,788	37.82	▲37.82
DAP	Fung Ket Wing	4,142	17.83	▲2.63
Total valid votes		23,236	100.00	
Total rejected ballots		151		
Unreturned ballots		76		
Turnout		23,463	64.96	▲8.99
Registered electors		36,121		
Majority		1,518	6.53	▼16.11
PBS hold		Swing		

Malaysian general election, 1990
Party	Candidate	Votes	%	∆%
PBS	Joseph Voon Shin Choi	8,504	51.55	▲51.55
Independent	Jabar	4,687	28.41	▲28.41
DAP	Hsing Yin Shean	2,507	15.20	▼39.07
AKAR	Pandikar Amin Mulia	763	4.62	▲4.62
Independent	Charles Tulis @ Mohd. Salleh	37	0.22	▲0.22
Total valid votes		16,498	100.00	
Total rejected ballots		173		
Unreturned ballots				
Turnout		16,671	55.97	▲4.52
Registered electors		29,787		
Majority		3,817	23.14	▲9.41
PBS gain from DAP		Swing		?

Malaysian general election, 1986
Party	Candidate	Votes	%
DAP	Hsing Yin Shean	5,981	54.27
BN	Chong Eng Leong	4,468	40.54
BERJAYA	Charles Fung Mosuil	572	5.19
Total valid votes		11,021	100.00
Total rejected ballots		85	
Unreturned ballots		0	
Turnout		11,106	51.45
Registered electors		21,587	
Majority		1,513	13.73
This was a new constituency created.
