= Hsing Yin Shean =

Malaysian politician (1958–2021)

- 邢荣顯

Member of the Malaysian Parliament for Tanjong Aru, Sabah
- In office 3 August 1986 – 19 October 1990
- Preceded by: Constituency created
- Succeeded by: Joseph Voon Shin Choi (PBS)
- Majority: 1,513 (1986)

Personal details
- Born: Leonard Hsing Yin Shean; 15 June 1958 Jesselton, North Borneo (now Kota Kinabalu, Sabah, Malaysia)
- Died: 1 June 2021 (aged 62) Kota Kinabalu, Sabah, Malaysia
- Resting place: St. Joseph's Benevolent Columbarium, 4½ Mile Old Penampang Road Roman Catholic Cemetery, Penampang, Kota Kinabalu, Sabah
- Citizenship: Malaysian
- Party: Democratic Action Party (DAP) (1986–2021)
- Other political affiliations: Pakatan Harapan (PH); Pakatan Rakyat (PR); Barisan Alternatif (BA); Gagasan Rakyat (GR)
- Spouse: Dorothy Cornelius Jimbangan
- Children: 1 daughter (Sonia Hsing Shiang Nee)
- Education: University of Wales Institute of Science and Technology
- Occupation: Politician, contractor

Leonard Hsing Yin Shean (simplified Chinese: 邢荣顯; traditional Chinese: 刑榮顯; pinyin: Xíng Róngxiǎn, 15 June 1958 – 1 June 2021) was a Malaysian politician. He was the single-term Member of Parliament (MP) for Tanjong Aru (1986-1990). He was also a member of the Democratic Action Party (DAP).

== Background ==
Hsing was born on 15 June 1958 and in Kota Kinabalu, Sabah. He finished his tertiary study in Architecture at University of Wales Institute of Science and Technology (now known as Cardiff University).

He was married to Dorothy Cornelius Jimbangan, a native Kadazan woman from suburban Penampang and the couple has a daughter named Sonia Hsing Shiang Nee.

== Political career ==
Hsing joined the DAP on 28 October 1986, at the time he had just returned to his hometown Kota Kinabalu after he graduated. He was only 28 then when he was first elected to the Parliament of Malaysia for winning the Tanjung Aru federal seat in the 1986 General Election. Hsing together with Fung Ket Wing (Sandakan), Gerard Math Lee Min (Gaya) and Samson Chin Chee Tsu (Tawau) were the first 4 MPs of DAP ever to have won parliamentary seats in Sabah then who had held them only for one term after DAP defeats in the 1990 General Election. After his parliamentary term ended, Hsing became a contractor but continued to remain with DAP and was involved in party work, especially in community service as a former MP.

== Death ==
Hsing died on 1 June 2021 9.52 pm, at the age of 62 and was two weeks away to be 63, after battling the COVID-19 infection for nearly a month at the intensive care unit (ICU) of Queen Elizabeth Hospital 1 (QEH1) in Kota Kinabalu. He was earlier confirmed to be COVID-19 positive and admitted into the hospital on 5 May. His death was confirmed by his younger brother Tony Hsing. His body was cremated at Fook Look Siew Crematorium after encoffining service at QEH1 thereafter the ashes interred at St. Joseph Benevolent Columbarium, 4½ Mile Old Penampang Road Roman Catholic Cemetery, Kota Kinabalu for his final resting place on 5 June according to the COVID-19 pandemic standard operating procedure (SOP).

== Election results ==
Parliament of Malaysia
Year	Constituency	Opposition	Votes	Pct	Opponent(s)	Votes	Pct	Ballots cast	Majority	Turnout
1986	P145 Tanjong Aru, Sabah	Hsing Yin Shean (DAP)	5,981	54.27%	Chong Eng Leong (PBS)	4,468	40.54%	11,106	1,513	51.45%
1986	P145 Tanjong Aru, Sabah	Hsing Yin Shean (DAP)	5,981	54.27%	Charles Fung Mosuil (BERJAYA)	572	5.19%	11,106	1,513	51.45%
1990	P145 Tanjong Aru, Sabah	Hsing Yin Shean (DAP)	2,507	15.20%	Joseph Voon Shin Choi (PBS)	8,504	51.55%	16,671	3,817	55.97%
1990	P145 Tanjong Aru, Sabah	Hsing Yin Shean (DAP)	2,507	15.20%	Jabar (IND)	4,687	28.41%	16,671	3,817	55.97%
1990	P145 Tanjong Aru, Sabah	Hsing Yin Shean (DAP)	2,507	15.20%	Pandikar Amin Mulia (AKAR)	763	4.62%	16,671	3,817	55.97%
1990	P145 Tanjong Aru, Sabah	Hsing Yin Shean (DAP)	2,507	15.20%	Charles Tulis @ Mohd Salleh (IND)	37	0.22%	16,671	3,817	55.97%

== See also ==
- Ethnic Chinese in the Dewan Rakyat
- List of politicians of Chinese descent
- List of deaths due to COVID-19 - notable individual deaths
