= Kota Kinabalu (federal constituency) =

Federal constituency of Sabah, Malaysia

Kota Kinabalu (P172)
Sabah constituency

Federal constituency
- Legislature: Dewan Rakyat
- MP: Chan Foong Hin; PH
- Constituency created: 1966
- Constituency abolished: 1974
- Constituency re-created: 2003
- First contested: 1969
- Last contested: 2022

Demographics
- Population (2020): 114,202
- Electors (2025): 72,144
- Area (km²): 26
- Pop. density (per km²): 4,392.4

Kota Kinabalu is a federal constituency in West Coast Division (Kota Kinabalu District and Penampang District), Sabah, Malaysia, that has been represented in the Dewan Rakyat from 1971 to 1974, from 2004 to present.

The federal constituency was created in the 1966 redistribution and is mandated to return a single member to the Dewan Rakyat under the first past the post voting system.

== Demographics ==
https://ge15.orientaldaily.com.my/seats/sabah/p

Ethnic breakdown of Kota Kinabalu's electorate as of 2022
1. Chinese (67.0%)
2. Sabah Bumiputera (21.4%)
3. Malay-Muslim Bumiputera (8.30%)
4. Other ethnicities (3.40%)

As of 2020, Kota Kinabalu has a population of 114,202 people.

Age breakdown of Kota Kinabalu's electorate as of 2022
1. 18-20 (3.32%)
2. 21-29 (14.1%)
3. 30-39 (19.1%)
4. 40-49 (18.2%)
5. 50-59 (16.6%)
6. 60-69 (16.1%)
7. 70-79 (8.69%)
8. 80-89 (2.85%)
9. above 90 (1.12%)
Gender breakdown of Kota Kinabalu's electorate as of 2022
1. Male (49.0%)
2. Female (51.0%)

== History ==
The constituency was first delineated as Jesselton. For the 1969 General Elections, this constituency was referred to as Jesselton (Kota Kinabalu). For Parliamentary sittings (1971–1974), member of Parliament of this area was referred as Kota Kinabalu. It was abolished in 1974 when it was redistributed. It was re-created in 2003.

=== Polling districts ===
According to the gazette issued on 21 November 2025, the Kota Kinabalu constituency has a total of 22 polling districts.

| State constituency | Polling Districts | Code | Location |
|---|---|---|---|
| Likas (N19) | Bandar Utara | 172/19/01 | Dewan Serbaguna Kompleks Sukan Likas |
| Likas (N19) | Bandar Selatan | 172/19/02 | Kolej Vokasional Likas |
| Likas (N19) | Likas Barat | 172/19/03 | SMK Perempuan Likas |
| Likas (N19) | Likas | 172/19/04 | SK St. Agnes |
| Likas (N19) | Likas Tengah | 172/19/05 | SJK (C) St. James Likas |
| Likas (N19) | Likas Selatan | 172/19/06 | SM Kian Kok |
| Likas (N19) | Likas Park | 172/19/07 | SMK Likas |
| Likas (N19) | Dah Yeh Villa | 172/19/08 | SM Tshung Tsin Sabah; SK Api-Api |
| Api-Api (N20) | Kampong Ayer | 172/20/01 | SJK (C) Chung Hwa Kg Air, Karamunsing |
| Api-Api (N20) | Jalan Istana | 172/20/02 | Tadika Tzu Yu |
| Api-Api (N20) | Jalan Kebajikan | 172/20/03 | Pusat Tingkatan Enam Maktab Sabah |
| Api-Api (N20) | Sunny Garden | 172/20/04 | SK Sacred Heart |
| Api-Api (N20) | Jalan Bandaran | 172/20/05 | SJK (C) Chung Hwa Kg Air Kota Kinabalu |
| Luyang (N21) | Jalan Rumah Sakit | 172/21/01 | Tadika Peak Nam Toong |
| Luyang (N21) | Luyang | 172/21/02 | SJK (C) Anglo-Chinese |
| Luyang (N21) | Foh Sang | 172/21/03 | Institut Pendidikan Guru Kampus Gaya; Dewan Serbaguna Wisma Pertanian |
| Luyang (N21) | Jindo | 172/21/04 | Dewan Serbaguna Luyang |
| Luyang (N21) | Bukit Padang | 172/21/05 | Dewan Foochow Bukit Padang |
| Luyang (N21) | Kepayan Ridge | 172/21/06 | SM Maktab Sabah |
| Luyang (N21) | Taman Fu Yen | 172/21/07 | SMK Taman Tun Fuad |
| Luyang (N21) | Jalan Penampang | 172/21/08 | SK Sri Gaya |
| Luyang (N21) | Lido | 172/21/09 | SMK Tinggi Kota Kinabalu |

=== Representation history ===
Members of Parliament for Kota Kinabalu
| Parliament | No | Years | Member | Party | Vote Share |
Constituency created
Jesselton
| | | 1969-1971 | Parliament was suspended | | |
| 3rd | P109 | 1971-1973 | Pang Tet Tshung (彭德聪) | SCA | 7,488; 74.63% |
| 3rd | P109 | 1973-1974 | Pang Tet Tshung (彭德聪) | BN (SCA) | 7,488; 74.63% |
Constituency abolished, renamed to Gaya
Constituency re-created from Gaya and Tanjong Aru
Kota Kinabalu
| 11th | P172 | 2004-2008 | Yee Moh Chai (于墨斋) | BN (PBS) | 15,993; 64.82% |
| 12th | P172 | 2008–2013 | Hiew King Cheu (邱庆洲) | PR (DAP) | 9,464; 34.31% |
| 13th | P172 | 2013-2015 | Jimmy Wong Sze Phin (黄仕平) | PR (DAP) | 28,516; 73.15% |
| 13th | P172 | 2015–2018 | Jimmy Wong Sze Phin (黄仕平) | PH (DAP) | 28,516; 73.15% |
| 14th | P172 | 2018–2022 | Chan Foong Hin (陈泓缣) | PH (DAP) | 31,632; 74.76% |
| 15th | P172 | 2022–present | Chan Foong Hin (陈泓缣) | PH (DAP) | 31,359; 71.08% |

=== State constituency ===
| Parliamentary constituency | State constituency | | | | | |
| Parliamentary constituency | 1967–1974 | 1974–1985 | 1985–1995 | 1995–2004 | 2004–2020 | 2020–present |
|---|---|---|---|---|---|---|
| Kota Kinabalu | | | | | Api-Api | |
| Kota Kinabalu | Jesselton Bandar | | | | | |
| Kota Kinabalu | | | | | Likas | |
| Kota Kinabalu | | | | | Luyang | |
| Kota Kinabalu | Tanjong Aru | | | | | |

=== Historical boundaries ===
| State Constituency | Area | | |
| State Constituency | 1966 | 2003 | 2020 |
|---|---|---|---|
| Api-Api | | Api-Api; Damai; Karamunsing; Kota Kinabalu; Taman Seputeh | Api-Api; Bukit Bandaran; Kota Kinabalu; Taman Sang Kancil; Taman Seputeh |
| Jesselton Bandar | Api-Api; Bukit Padang; Luyang; Kolombong; Pulau Gaya | | |
| Likas | | Likas; Jalan Tuaran; Taman Bunga Raya; Taman Happy Garden; Taman Yakim Jaya | Damai; Jalan Tuaran; Likas; Taman Happy Garden; Taman Yakim Jaya |
| Luyang | | Kepayan Ridge; Kopungit; Luyang; Taman Milek; Taman Waja | Kepayan Ridge; Kopungit; Lintas; Luyang; Taman Milek |
| Tanjong Aru | Karamunsing; Kepayan; Lido; Putatan Ramayah; Sembulan | | |

=== Current state assembly members ===
| No. | State Constituency | Member | Coalition (Party) |
|---|---|---|---|
| N19 | Likas | Tham Yun Fook | WARISAN |
| N20 | Api-Api | Loi Kok Liang | WARISAN |
| N21 | Luyang | Samuel Wong Tshun Chuen | WARISAN |

=== Local governments & postcodes ===
| No. | State Constituency | Local Government | Postcode |
|---|---|---|---|
| N19 | Likas | Kota Kinabalu City Hall | 80000, 88100, 88200, 88300, 88400, 88450, 88460, 88500, 88502, 88506 Kota Kinabalu; 89500 Penampang |
| N20 | Api-Api | Kota Kinabalu City Hall | 80000, 88100, 88200, 88300, 88400, 88450, 88460, 88500, 88502, 88506 Kota Kinabalu; 89500 Penampang |
| N21 | Luyang | Kota Kinabalu City Hall; Penampang Municipal Council (Taman Fraser area) | 80000, 88100, 88200, 88300, 88400, 88450, 88460, 88500, 88502, 88506 Kota Kinabalu; 89500 Penampang |

== Election results ==
Malaysian general election, 2022
| Party | Candidate | Votes | % | ∆% |
|---|---|---|---|---|
| PH | Chan Foong Hin | 31,359 | 71.08 | ▲71.08 |
| Heritage | Amanda Yeo Yan Yin | 7,576 | 17.17 | ▲17.17 |
| GRS | Yee Tsai Yiew | 4,592 | 10.41 | ▲10.41 |
| KDM | Winston Liaw Kit Siong | 456 | 1.03 | ▲1.03 |
| Independent | Marcel Jude | 137 | 0.31 | ▲0.31 |
| Total valid votes | | 44,120 | 100.00 | |
| Total rejected ballots | | 357 | | |
| Unreturned ballots | | 186 | | |
| Turnout | | 44,663 | 59.57 | ▼16.69 |
| Registered electors | | 74,059 | | |
| Majority | | 23,783 | 53.91 | ▼3.02 |
| PH hold | | Swing | | |

Malaysian general election, 2018
| Party | Candidate | Votes | % | ∆% |
|---|---|---|---|---|
| DAP | Chan Foong Hin | 31,632 | 74.76 | ▲1.61 |
| BN | Joseph Lee Han Kyun | 7,546 | 17.84 | ▼6.68 |
| SAPP | Yong Teck Lee | 3,132 | 7.40 | ▲7.40 |
| Total valid votes | | 42,310 | 100.00 | |
| Total rejected ballots | | 563 | | |
| Unreturned ballots | | 0 | | |
| Turnout | | 42,873 | 76.26 | ▼2.03 |
| Registered electors | | 56,220 | | |
| Majority | | 24,086 | 56.93 | ▲8.30 |
| DAP hold | | Swing | | |
Source(s) "His Majesty's Government Gazette - Notice of Contested Election, Parliament for the State of Sabah [P.U. (B) 246/2018]" (PDF). Attorney General's Chambers of Malaysia. 3 May 2018. "Federal Government Gazette - Results of Contested Election and Statements of the Poll after the Official Addition of Votes, Parliamentary Constituencies for the State of Sabah [P.U. (B) 320/2018]" (PDF). Attorney General's Chambers of Malaysia. 28 May 2018. Archived from the original (PDF) on 2019-12-29.

Malaysian general election, 2013
| Party | Candidate | Votes | % | ∆% |
|---|---|---|---|---|
| DAP | Wong Sze Phin @ Jimmy | 28,516 | 73.15 | ▲38.84 |
| BN | Chin Tek Ming | 9,557 | 24.52 | ▼6.01 |
| STAR | Liew Hock Leong @ Michael | 909 | 2.33 | ▲2.33 |
| Total valid votes | | 38,982 | 100.00 | |
| Total rejected ballots | | 506 | | |
| Unreturned ballots | | 60 | | |
| Turnout | | 39,548 | 78.29 | ▲14.20 |
| Registered electors | | 50,516 | | |
| Majority | | 18,959 | 48.63 | ▲48.25 |
| DAP hold | | Swing | | |
Source(s) "Federal Government Gazette - Notice of Contested Election, Parliament for the State of Sabah [P.U. (B) 183/2013]" (PDF). Attorney General's Chambers of Malaysia. 26 April 2013. Archived from the original (PDF) on 2018-09-30. "Federal Government Gazette - Results of Contested Election and Statements of the Poll after the Official Addition of Votes, Parliamentary Constituencies for the State of Sabah [P.U. (B) 224/2013]" (PDF). Attorney General's Chambers of Malaysia. 22 May 2013. Archived from the original (PDF) on 2018-09-30.

Malaysian general election, 2008
| Party | Candidate | Votes | % | ∆% |
|---|---|---|---|---|
| DAP | Hiew King Cheu | 9,464 | 34.31 | ▲13.29 |
| PKR | Christina Liew | 9,358 | 33.93 | ▲19.78 |
| BN | Chin Tek Ming | 8,420 | 30.53 | ▼34.29 |
| Independent | Kong Yu Kiong | 341 | 1.24 | ▼1.24 |
| Total valid votes | | 27,583 | 100.00 | |
| Total rejected ballots | | 326 | | |
| Unreturned ballots | | 108 | | |
| Turnout | | 28,017 | 64.09 | ▲5.93 |
| Registered electors | | 43,714 | | |
| Majority | | 106 | 0.38 | ▼43.42 |
| DAP gain from BN | | Swing | | ? |

Malaysian general election, 2004
| Party | Candidate | Votes | % | ∆% |
|---|---|---|---|---|
| BN | Yee Moh Chai | 15,993 | 64.82 | ▲64.82 |
| DAP | Hiew King Cheu | 5,187 | 21.02 | ▲21.02 |
| PKR | Christina Liew | 3,492 | 14.15 | ▲14.15 |
| Total valid votes | | 24,672 | 100.00 | |
| Total rejected ballots | | 294 | | |
| Unreturned ballots | | 112 | | |
| Turnout | | 25,078 | 58.16 | ▼9.06 |
| Registered electors | | | | |
| Majority | | 10,806 | 43.80 | ▼5.46 |
| BN gain from SCA | | Swing | | ? |

Malaysian general election, 1969
| Party | Candidate | Votes | % |
|---|---|---|---|
| SCA | Pang Tet Tshung | 7,488 | 74.63 |
| Independent | William Lye | 2,545 | 25.37 |
| Total valid votes | | 10,033 | 100.00 |
| Total rejected ballots | | 246 | |
| Unreturned ballots | | | |
| Turnout | | 10,279 | 67.22 |
| Registered electors | | 15,291 | |
| Majority | | 4,943 | 49.26 |
This was a new constituency created.
