= Kluang Utara =

Johor constituency

Defunct federal constituency
- Legislature: Dewan Rakyat
- Constituency created: 1958
- Constituency abolished: 1974
- First contested: 1959
- Last contested: 1969

Kluang Utara was a federal constituency in Johor, Malaysia, that was represented in the Dewan Rakyat from 1959 to 1974.

The federal constituency was created in the 1974 redistribution and was mandated to return a single member to the Dewan Rakyat under the first past the post voting system.

== History ==
It was abolished in 1974 when it was redistributed.

=== Representation history ===
Members of Parliament for Kluang Utara
| Parliament | No | Years | Member | Party | Vote Share |
Constituency split from Johore Tengah
Parliament of the Federation of Malaya
| 1st | P095 | 1959-1963 | Lee San Choon (李三春) | Alliance (MCA) | 5,985; 56.92% |
Parliament of Malaysia
| 1st | P095 | 1963-1964 | Lee San Choon (李三春) | Alliance (MCA) | 5,985; 56.92% |
| 2nd | P095 | 1964-1969 | Tiah Eng Bee (程荣美) | Alliance (MCA) | 9,138; 53.48% |
| | | 1969-1971 | Parliament was suspended | | |
| 3rd | P095 | 1971-1973 | Tiah Eng Bee (程荣美) | Alliance (MCA) | 8,937; 53.04% |
| 3rd | P095 | 1973-1974 | Tiah Eng Bee (程荣美) | BN (MCA) | 8,937; 53.04% |
Constituency abolished, split into Keluang, Renggam, Sri Gading and Ayer Hitam

=== State constituency ===
| Parliamentary constituency | State constituency | | | | | | |
| Parliamentary constituency | 1954–59* | 1959–1974 | 1974–1986 | 1986–1995 | 1995–2004 | 2004–2018 | 2018–present |
|---|---|---|---|---|---|---|---|
| Kluang Utara | | Gunong Lambak | | | | | |
| Kluang Utara | | Sri Lalang | | | | | |

=== Historical boundaries ===
| State Constituency | Area |
| State Constituency | 1959 |
|---|---|
| Gunong Lambak | FELDA Ulu Belitong; Kampung Gajah; Kampung Melayu; Kampung Yap Tau Sah; Kluang |
| Sri Lalang | FELDA Air Hitam; Kampung Haji Hamzah Batu 7; Kampung Sungai Linau; Seri Lalang; Taman Intan |

== Election results ==
Malaysian general election, 1969: Kluang Utara
| Party | Candidate | Votes | % | ∆% |
|---|---|---|---|---|
| Alliance | Tiah Eng Bee | 8,937 | 53.04 | ▼0.44 |
| DAP | Lee Kaw | 7,914 | 46.96 | ▲46.96 |
| Total valid votes | | 16,851 | 100.00 | |
| Total rejected ballots | | 1,125 | | |
| Unreturned ballots | | 0 | | |
| Turnout | | 17,976 | 70.96 | ▼10.08 |
| Registered electors | | 25,334 | | |
| Majority | | 1,023 | 6.08 | ▼8.34 |
| Alliance hold | | Swing | | |

Malaysian general election, 1964: Kluang Utara
| Party | Candidate | Votes | % | ∆% |
|---|---|---|---|---|
| Alliance | Tiah Eng Bee | 9,138 | 53.48 | ▼3.44 |
| Socialist Front | Lee Ah Leng | 6,674 | 39.06 | ▼4.02 |
| PAP | Lai Tha Chai | 1,276 | 7.47 | ▲7.47 |
| Total valid votes | | 17,088 | 100.00 | |
| Total rejected ballots | | 523 | | |
| Unreturned ballots | | 0 | | |
| Turnout | | 17,611 | 81.04 | ▲3.05 |
| Registered electors | | 21,731 | | |
| Majority | | 2,464 | 14.42 | ▲0.58 |
| Alliance hold | | Swing | | |

Malayan general election, 1959: Kluang Utara
| Party | Candidate | Votes | % |
|---|---|---|---|
| Alliance | Lee San Choon | 5,985 | 56.92 |
| Socialist Front | Wee Lee Fong | 4,530 | 43.08 |
| Total valid votes | | 10,515 | 100.00 |
| Total rejected ballots | | 79 | |
| Unreturned ballots | | 0 | |
| Turnout | | 10,594 | 77.99 |
| Registered electors | | 13,583 | |
| Majority | | 1,455 | 13.84 |
This was a new constituency created.
