= Ulu Kinta (federal constituency) =

Perak constituency

Defunct federal constituency
- Legislature: Dewan Rakyat
- Constituency created: 1958
- Constituency abolished: 1974
- First contested: 1959
- Last contested: 1969

Ulu Kinta was a federal constituency in Perak, Malaysia, that was represented in the Dewan Rakyat from 1959 to 1974.

The federal constituency was created in the 1974 redistribution and was mandated to return a single member to the Dewan Rakyat under the first past the post voting system.

== History ==
It was abolished in 1974 when it was redistributed.

=== Representation history ===
Members of Parliament for Ulu Kinta
| Parliament | No | Years | Member | Party | Vote Share |
Constituency created from Kinta Utara
Parliament of the Federation of Malaya
| 1st | P049 | 1959-1963 | Chan Swee Ho (曾瑞豪) | PPP | 6,996; 53.93% |
Parliament of Malaysia
| 1st | P049 | 1963-1964 | Chan Swee Ho (曾瑞豪) | PPP | 6,996; 53.93% |
| 2nd | P049 | 1964-1969 | Chin Foon (甄宽) | Alliance (MCA) | 7,351; 46.33% |
| | | 1969-1971 | Parliament was suspended | | |
| 3rd | P049 | 1971-1973 | Chan Yoon Onn (陈源安) | PPP | 10,706; 58.51% |
| 3rd | P049 | 1973-1974 | Chan Yoon Onn (陈源安) | BN (PPP) | 10,706; 58.51% |
Constituency abolished, split into Kinta and Menglembu

=== State constituency ===
| Parliamentary constituency | State constituency | | | | | | |
| Parliamentary constituency | 1955–59* | 1959–1974 | 1974–1986 | 1986–1995 | 1995–2004 | 2004–2018 | 2018–present |
|---|---|---|---|---|---|---|---|
| Ulu Kinta | | Chemor | | | | | |
| Ulu Kinta | | Sungei Raia | | | | | |

=== Historical boundaries ===
| State Constituency | Area |
| State Constituency | 1959 |
|---|---|
| Chemor | Changkat Kiding; Chemor; Khantan; Klebang; Tanjung Rambutan |
| Sungei Raia | Jelapang; Manjoi; Meru Raya; Simpang Pulai; Tambun |

== Election results ==
Malaysian general election, 1969
| Party | Candidate | Votes | % | ∆% |
|---|---|---|---|---|
| PPP | Chan Yoon Onn | 10,706 | 58.51 | ▲18.52 |
| Alliance | Chin Foon | 7,591 | 41.49 | ▼4.84 |
| Total valid votes | | 18,297 | 100.00 | |
| Total rejected ballots | | 841 | | |
| Unreturned ballots | | 0 | | |
| Turnout | | 19,138 | 78.19 | ▼5.11 |
| Registered electors | | 24,475 | | |
| Majority | | 3,115 | 17.02 | ▲10.68 |
| PPP gain from Alliance | | Swing | | ? |

Malaysian general election, 1964
| Party | Candidate | Votes | % | ∆% |
|---|---|---|---|---|
| Alliance | Chin Foon | 7,351 | 46.33 | ▲10.65 |
| PPP | Chan Swee Ho | 6,345 | 39.99 | ▼13.94 |
| Socialist Front | Low Sin Yean | 2,172 | 13.69 | ▲3.31 |
| Total valid votes | | 15,868 | 100.00 | |
| Total rejected ballots | | 567 | | |
| Unreturned ballots | | 0 | | |
| Turnout | | 16,435 | 83.30 | ▲9.90 |
| Registered electors | | 19,729 | | |
| Majority | | 1,006 | 6.34 | ▼11.91 |
| Alliance gain from PPP | | Swing | | ? |

Malayan general election, 1959
| Party | Candidate | Votes | % |
|---|---|---|---|
| PPP | Chan Swee Ho | 6,996 | 53.93 |
| Alliance | K. C. Chan | 4,629 | 35.68 |
| Socialist Front | Yau Hong Seh | 1,347 | 10.38 |
| Total valid votes | | 12,972 | 100.00 |
| Total rejected ballots | | 348 | |
| Unreturned ballots | | 0 | |
| Turnout | | 13,320 | 73.40 |
| Registered electors | | 18,147 | |
| Majority | | 2,367 | 18.25 |
This was a new constituency created.
