= Kluang Selatan =

Johor constituency

Defunct federal constituency
- Legislature: Dewan Rakyat
- Constituency created: 1958
- Constituency abolished: 1974
- First contested: 1959
- Last contested: 1969

Kluang Selatan was a federal constituency in Johor, Malaysia, that was represented in the Dewan Rakyat from 1959 to 1974.

The federal constituency was created in the 1974 redistribution and was mandated to return a single member to the Dewan Rakyat under the first past the post voting system.

== History ==
It was abolished in 1974 when it was redistributed.

=== Representation history ===
Members of Parliament for Kluang Selatan
Parliament	No	Years	Member	Party	Vote Share
Constituency split from Johore Tengah
Parliament of the Federation of Malaya
1st	P099	1959-1963	Chan Chong Wen (曾崇文)	Alliance (MCA)	8,754; 65.85%
Parliament of Malaysia
1st	P099	1963-1964	Chan Chong Wen (曾崇文)	Alliance (MCA)	8,754; 65.85%
2nd	P099	1964–1969	Chan Chong Wen (曾崇文)	Alliance (MCA)	11,926; 64.96%
		1969-1971	Parliament was suspended		
3rd	P099	1971-1973	Chu Chee Peng (朱子平)	Alliance (MCA)	12.754; 64.39%
3rd	P099	1973-1974	Chu Chee Peng (朱子平)	BN (MCA)	12.754; 64.39%
Constituency abolished, split into Renggam and Sri Gading

=== State constituency ===
Parliamentary constituency	State constituency						
Parliamentary constituency	1954–59*	1959–1974	1974–1986	1986–1995	1995–2004	2004–2018	2018–present
Kluang Selatan		Rengam					
Kluang Selatan		Senai-Kulai					

=== Historical boundaries ===
State Constituency	Area
State Constituency	1959
Rengam	Ayer Bemban; Kelapa Sawit; Layang-Layang; Simpang Renggam; Renggam
Senai-Kulai	FELDA Taib Andak; Kulai; Saleng; Senai; Pulai

== Election results ==
Malaysian general election, 1969: Kluang Selatan
Party	Candidate	Votes	%	∆%
Alliance	Chu Chee Peng	12,754	64.39	▼0.57
DAP	Lee Kuo Ming @ Lee Kok Bin	7,053	35.61	▲35.61
Total valid votes		19,807	100.00	
Total rejected ballots		1,418		
Unreturned ballots		0		
Turnout		21,225	68.09	▼13.79
Registered electors		31,171		
Majority		5,701	28.78	▼1.14
Alliance hold		Swing		

Malaysian general election, 1964: Kluang Selatan
Party	Candidate	Votes	%	∆%
Alliance	Chan Chong Wen	11,926	64.96	▼0.89
Socialist Front	Hon Kin Siong	6,434	35.04	▲0.89
Total valid votes		18,360	100.00	
Total rejected ballots		601		
Unreturned ballots		0		
Turnout		18,961	81.88	▲2.24
Registered electors		23,158		
Majority		5,492	29.92	▼1.78
Alliance hold		Swing		

Malayan general election, 1959: Kluang Selatan
Party	Candidate	Votes	%
Alliance	Chan Chong Wen	8,754	65.85
Socialist Front	Tan Kai Hee	4,540	34.15
Total valid votes		13,294	100.00
Total rejected ballots		150	
Unreturned ballots		0	
Turnout		13,444	79.64
Registered electors		16,880	
Majority		4,214	31.70
This was a new constituency created.
