= Api-Api (state constituency) =

State constituency in Sabah, Malaysia

Api-Api (N20)
Sabah constituency

State constituency
- Legislature: Sabah State Legislative Assembly
MLA
Loi Kok Liang
Heritage
- Constituency created: 1974
- First contested: 1974
- Last contested: 2025

Demographics
- Electors (2025): 17,782

Api-Api is a state constituency in Sabah, Malaysia, that is represented in the Sabah State Legislative Assembly. The representative elected in 2018 is Christina Liew.

== Demographics ==
As of 2020, Api-Api has a population of 21,005 people.

Ethnic breakdown of Api-Api's electorate as of 2025
1. Muslim Bumiputera (41.0%)
2. Chinese (34.0%)
3. Non-Muslim Bumiputera (25.0%)
4. Other ethnicities (0.00%)

== History ==
=== Polling districts ===
According to the gazette issued on 31 October 2022, the Api-Api constituency has a total of 5 polling districts.

State constituency	Polling Districts	Code	Location
Api-Api (N20)	Kampong Ayer	172/20/01	SJK (C) Chung Hwa Kg Air, Karamunsing
Api-Api (N20)	Jalan Istana	172/20/02	Tadika Tzu Yu
Api-Api (N20)	Jalan Kebajikan	172/20/03	Pusat Tingkatan Enam Maktab Sabah
Api-Api (N20)	Sunny Garden	172/20/04	SK Sacred Heart
Api-Api (N20)	Jalan Bandaran	172/20/05	SJK (C) Chung Hwa Kg Air, Karamunsing

=== Representation history ===
Member of Sabah State Legislative Assembly for Api-Api
Assembly	No	Years	Member	Party
Constituency created from Likas and Kota Kinabalu
7th	N29	1985 – 1986	Chau Tet On (曹德安)	PBS
8th	N29	1986 – 1990	Chau Tet On (曹德安)	PBS
9th	N29	1990 – 1994	Chau Tet On (曹德安)	GR (PBS)
10th	N29	1994	Chau Tet On (曹德安)	GR (PBS)
10th	N29	1994 – 1999	Chau Tet On (曹德安)	BN (MCA)
11th	N14	1999 – 2002	Yee Moh Chai (于墨斋)	PBS
11th	N14	2002 – 2004	Yee Moh Chai (于墨斋)	BN (PBS)
12th	N15	2004 – 2008	Yee Moh Chai (于墨斋)	BN (PBS)
13th	N15	2008 – 2013	Yee Moh Chai (于墨斋)	BN (PBS)
14th	N15	2013 – 2015	Christina Liew (刘静芝)	PKR
14th	N15	2015 – 2018	Christina Liew (刘静芝)	PH (PKR)
15th	N15	2018 – 2020	Christina Liew (刘静芝)	PH (PKR)
16th	N20	2020 – 2025	Christina Liew (刘静芝)	PH (PKR)
17th	N20	2025–present	Loi Kok Liang (黎國亮)	WARISAN

== Election results ==
Sabah state election, 2025
Party	Candidate	Votes	%	∆%
Heritage	Loi Kok Liang	6,061	59.84	▲59.84
PH	Thonny Chee	2,996	29.58	▲29.58
Homeland Solidarity Party	Ting Shu Kiong	598	5.90	▲5.90
Sabah Dream Party	Kandrix Ng Chun Sua	336	3.32	▲3.32
PBK	Soh Kee Suat	137	1.35	▲1.35
Total valid votes		10,128		
Total rejected ballots		120		
Unreturned ballots		25		
Turnout		10,273	57.77	▼4.19
Registered electors		17,782		
Majority		3,065	30.26	▼15.01
Heritage gain from PKR		Swing		?
Source(s) "RESULTS OF CONTESTED ELECTION AND STATEMENTS OF THE POLL AFTER THE OFFICIAL ADDITION OF VOTES" (PDF).

Sabah state election, 2020
Party	Candidate	Votes	%	∆%
PKR	Christina Liew	7,796	65.71	▲65.71
PBS	Yee Moh Chai	2,449	20.64	▲20.64
Love Sabah Party	Pang Yuk Ming	431	3.63	▲3.63
LDP	Chin Su Phin	317	2.67	▲2.67
Sabah People's Unity Party	Lo Yau Foh	280	2.36	▲2.36
GAGASAN	Chong Tze Kiun	97	0.82	▲0.82
Independent	Sim Sie Hong	72	0.61	▲0.61
Independent	Ng Chun Sua	41	0.34	▲0.34
Independent	Marcel Jude	16	0.13	▲0.13
Total valid votes		11,499	98.92	
Total rejected ballots		336	2.83	
Unreturned ballots		30	0.25	
Turnout		11,865	61.96	▼14.44
Registered electors		19,149		
Majority		5,347	45.07	▲25.01
PKR hold		Swing		
Source(s) "RESULTS OF CONTESTED ELECTION AND STATEMENTS OF THE POLL AFTER THE OFFICIAL ADDITION OF VOTES".

Sabah state election, 2018
Party	Candidate	Votes	%	∆%
PH	Christina Liew	8,174	55.50	▲55.50
BN	Yee Moh Chai	5,220	35.44	▼6.32
SAPP	Lim Kat Chung	598	4.06	▼1.83
Sabah Native Co-operation Party	Land Lip Fong	244	1.66	▲0.40
Independent	Chan Chee Ching	94	0.64	▲0.64
Total valid votes		14,330	97.29	
Total rejected ballots		378	2.57	
Unreturned ballots		21	0.14	
Turnout		14,729	76.40	▼3.80
Registered electors		19,279		
Majority		2,954	20.06	▲13.49
PH hold		Swing		
Source(s) "RESULTS OF CONTESTED ELECTION AND STATEMENTS OF THE POLL AFTER THE OFFICIAL ADDITION OF VOTES".

Sabah state election, 2013
Party	Candidate	Votes	%	∆%
PKR	Christina Liew	5,853	48.33	▲0.83
BN	Yee Moh Chai	5,058	41.76	▼8.28
SAPP	Wong Yit Ming	713	5.89	▲5.89
Sabah Native Co-operation Party	Felix Chong Kat Fah	152	1.26	▲1.26
Independent	Marcel Jude Ms Joseph	14	0.12	▲0.12
Total valid votes		11,770	97.18	
Total rejected ballots		309	2.55	
Unreturned ballots		12	0.10	
Turnout		12,111	80.20	▲16.79
Registered electors		15,103		
Majority		795	6.57	▲4.03
PKR gain from BN		Swing		?
Source(s) "KEPUTUSAN PILIHAN RAYA UMUM DEWAN UNDANGAN NEGERI".

Sabah state election, 2008
Party	Candidate	Votes	%	∆%
BN	Yee Moh Chai	3,419	50.04	▼22.27
PKR	Christina Liew	3,245	47.50	▲47.50
Total valid votes		6,664	97.54	
Total rejected ballots		110	1.61	
Unreturned ballots		58	0.85	
Turnout		6,832	63.41	▲6.97
Registered electors		10,775		
Majority		174	2.54	▼43.17
BN hold		Swing		
Source(s) "KEPUTUSAN PILIHAN RAYA UMUM DEWAN UNDANGAN NEGERI SABAH BAGI TAHUN 2008".

Sabah state election, 2004
Party	Candidate	Votes	%	∆%
BN	Yee Moh Chai	4,640	72.31	▲16.04
DAP	Fung Kong Win	1,707	26.60	▲26.60
Total valid votes		6,347	98.91	
Total rejected ballots		70	1.09	
Unreturned ballots		0	0.00	
Turnout		6,417	56.44	▼13.91
Registered electors		11,369		
Majority		2,933	45.71	▲26.12
BN gain from PBS		Swing		?
Source(s) "KEPUTUSAN PILIHAN RAYA UMUM DEWAN UNDANGAN NEGERI SABAH BAGI TAHUN 2004".

Sabah state election, 1999
Party	Candidate	Votes	%	∆%
PBS	Yee Moh Chai	9,146	56.27	▼8.60
BN	Chau Tet On	5,963	36.68	▲2.31
BERSEKUTU	Chin Chen Fui	1,040	6.40	▲6.40
Total valid votes		16,149	99.35	
Total rejected ballots		106	0.65	
Unreturned ballots		0	0.00	
Turnout		16,255	70.35	▲0.02
Registered electors		23,107		
Majority		3,183	19.59	▼10.91
PBS hold		Swing		
Source(s) "KEPUTUSAN PILIHAN RAYA UMUM DEWAN UNDANGAN NEGERI SABAH BAGI TAHUN 1999".

Sabah state election, 1994
Party	Candidate	Votes	%	∆%
PBS	Chau Tet On	9,132	64.87	▼11.81
BN	Chong Nyim Fatt @ Terence	4,838	34.37	▲34.37
Total valid votes		13,970	99.23	
Total rejected ballots		108	0.77	
Unreturned ballots		0	0.00	
Turnout		14,078	70.33	▼2.18
Registered electors		20,016		
Majority		4,294	30.50	▼35.30
PBS hold		Swing		
Source(s) "KEPUTUSAN PILIHAN RAYA UMUM DEWAN UNDANGAN NEGERI SABAH BAGI TAHUN 1994".

Sabah state election, 1990
Party	Candidate	Votes	%	∆%
PBS	Chau Tet On	9,949	76.68	▼9.58
BERJAYA	Lim Guan Sing	1,412	10.88	▼0.34
DAP	Hiew King Chieu	1,039	8.01	▲8.01
LDP	Wong Ing Huong	385	2.97	▲2.97
PRS	Chang Kon Fah	109	0.84	▲0.84
Independent	Hwa Kin Ryh Francis	26	0.20	▲0.20
Total valid votes		12,920	99.58	
Total rejected ballots		55	0.42	
Unreturned ballots		0	0.00	
Turnout		12,975	72.51	▼3.25
Registered electors		17,894		
Majority		8,537	65.80	▼9.24
PBS hold		Swing		
Source(s) "KEPUTUSAN PILIHAN RAYA UMUM DEWAN UNDANGAN NEGERI SABAH BAGI TAHUN 1990".

Sabah state election, 1986
Party	Candidate	Votes	%	∆%
PBS	Chau Tet On	10,294	86.50	▲32.92
BERJAYA	Chong Kon Fui	1,339	11.25	▲11.25
SCA	Chin Nyuk Fatt	180	1.51	▲1.51
SCCP	Johnny Sun Chung Sang @ Kim Shang	51	0.43	▲0.43
Independent	Joshua Kong Yun Chee	37	0.31	▲0.31
Total valid votes		11,901	100.00	
Total rejected ballots		33		
Unreturned ballots		0		
Turnout		11,934	75.76	▲0.97
Registered electors		15,753		
Majority		8,955	75.25	▲68.10
PBS hold		Swing		
Source(s) "KEPUTUSAN PILIHAN RAYA UMUM DEWAN UNDANGAN NEGERI SABAH BAGI TAHUN 1986".

Sabah state election, 1985
Party	Candidate	Votes	%
PBS	Chau Tet On	5,267	53.58
BERJAYA	Lim Guan Sing	4,564	46.42
Total valid votes		9,831	100.00
Total rejected ballots		78	
Unreturned ballots		0	
Turnout		9,909	74.79
Registered electors		13,249	
Majority		703	7.15
This was a new constituency created
