= Kinta (federal constituency) =

Perak constituency

Defunct federal constituency
- Legislature: Dewan Rakyat
- Constituency created: 1974
- Constituency abolished: 1986
- First contested: 1974
- Last contested: 1982

Kinta was a federal constituency in Perak, Malaysia, that was represented in the Dewan Rakyat from 1974 to 1986.

The federal constituency was created in the 1974 redistribution and was mandated to return a single member to the Dewan Rakyat under the first past the post voting system.

== History ==
It was abolished in 1986 when it was redistributed.

=== Representation history ===
Members of Parliament for Kinta
Parliament	No	Years	Member	Party	Vote Share
Constituency created from Ulu Kinta and Kampar
4th	P053	1974-1978	Ngan Siong Hin (颜祥兴)	DAP	15,885; 45.86%
5th	P053	1978-1982	Yang Choong Fu (杨忠富)	BN (MCA)	21,221; 48.85%
6th	P053	1982-1986	Lim Liang Seng (林良成)	BN (MCA)	30,229; 59.75%
Constituency abolished, split into Batu Gajah, Tambun and Gopeng

=== State constituency ===
Parliamentary constituency	State constituency						
Parliamentary constituency	1955–59*	1959–1974	1974–1986	1986–1995	1995–2004	2004–2018	2018–present
Kinta			Chemor				
Kinta			Gopeng				

=== Historical boundaries ===
State Constituency	Area
State Constituency	1974
Chemor	Gunung Rapat; Jelapang; Klebang; Meru Raya; Tambun
Gopeng	Gopeng; Kampung Jeram; Kopisan Baru; Malim Nawar; Simpang Pulai

== Election results ==
Malaysian general election, 1982
Party	Candidate	Votes	%	∆%
BN	Lim Liang Seng	30,229	59.75	▲10.90
DAP	Soong Chok Tak	17,356	34.31	▼9.46
PAS	Mohamed Tarmizi Mahmood	2,385	4.71	▼2.67
PEKEMAS	Shaharuddin Dahlan	619	1.22	▲1.22
Total valid votes		50,589	100.00	
Total rejected ballots		1,263		
Unreturned ballots		0		
Turnout		51,852	74.76	▼3.51
Registered electors		69,362		
Majority		12,873	25.44	▲20.36
BN hold		Swing		

Malaysian general election, 1978
Party	Candidate	Votes	%	∆%
BN	Yang Choong Fu @ Yeoh Teong Hoo	21,221	48.85	▲4.67
DAP	Farn Seong Than	19,014	43.77	▼2.09
PAS	Samsudin Harun	3,207	7.38	▲7.38
Total valid votes		43,442	100.00	
Total rejected ballots		1,689		
Unreturned ballots		0		
Turnout		45,131	78.27	▲0.97
Registered electors		57,661		
Majority		2,207	5.08	▲3.40
BN gain from DAP		Swing		?

Malaysian general election, 1974
Party	Candidate	Votes	%
DAP	Ngan Siong Hin @ Ngan Siong Eng	15,885	45.86
BN	Wong Kwong Nam	15,304	44.18
Independent	Yong Su Hian	2,028	5.85
Independent	Samsudin Harun	1,424	4.11
Total valid votes		34,641	100.00
Total rejected ballots		1,156	
Unreturned ballots		0	
Turnout		35,797	77.30
Registered electors		46,307	
Majority		581	1.68
This was a new constituency created.
