= Yee Moh Chai =

Malaysian politician

Yang Berbahagia Datuk Seri Panglima Yee Moh Chai SPDK PGDK
- 于墨斋

Minister of Resources and Information Technology Development of Sabah
- In office 2008–2018
- Governor: Ahmadshah Abdullah (2008–2010); Juhar Mahiruddin (2011–2018)
- Chief Minister: Musa Aman

Deputy President of the United Sabah Party (Chinese Quota)
- Incumbent
- Assumed office 2008 Serving with Joachim Gunsalam (Non-Muslim Bumiputera) & Jahid Jahim (Muslim Bumiputera)
- President: Maximus Ongkili

Member of the Malaysian Parliament for Kota Kinabalu
- In office 21 March 2004 – 8 March 2008
- Preceded by: Constituency created
- Succeeded by: Hiew King Cheu (DAP)

Member of the Malaysian Parliament for Tanjong Aru
- In office 24/25 April 1995 – 21 March 2004
- Preceded by: Joseph Voon Shin Choi (PBS)
- Succeeded by: Constituency abolished

Member of the Sabah State Legislative Assembly for Api-Api
- In office 18/19 February 1994 – 5 May 2013
- Preceded by: Chau Tet On (PBS)
- Succeeded by: Christina Liew (PKR)

Personal details
- Born: Yee Moh Chai; 25 May 1955 (age 70)
- Citizenship: Malaysian
- Party: United Sabah Party (PBS)
- Other political affiliations: Barisan Nasional (BN) (2002–2018); United Alliance (2018–2020); Gabungan Rakyat Sabah (GRS) (since 2020)
- Spouse: Vicky Lai Nyat Yin
- Children: 5
- Occupation: Politician
- Profession: Lawyer

Yee Moh Chai (Chinese: 于墨齋; pinyin: Yú MòZhāi; Jyutping: Jyu4 Mak6 Zaai1; Pe̍h-ōe-jī: U Be̍k-chai) is a Malaysian politician who had served ad the Member of Parliament for Tanjong Aru from 1995 to 2004 and for Kota Kinabalu from 2004 to 2008 and was also the Member of Sabah State Legislative Assembly for Api-Api from 1994 to 2013. He is a member and the Deputy President of United Sabah Party (Chinese quota) since 2008.

== Early career ==
He started his career as a doctor. After that, he worked as a lawyer in Dr. Yee & Associates until he was appointed into the Sabah Cabinet.

== Politics ==
Yee is currently one of three Deputy Presidents of PBS.

Yee made his election debut in the 1994 Sabah state election for the Likas state seat but lost to the President of SAPP, Yong Teck Lee. In the 1995 Malaysian general election, he competed for the Tanjong Aru federal seat and was successful to defeat the incumbent, Joseph Voon. He then changed to compete for the Api-Api state seat in the 1999 Sabah state election.

Yee was appointed as the Sabah Minister of Resources and Information Technology Development after the 2004 Sabah state election and was able to secure his post after the 2008 Sabah state election.

== Election result ==
Parliament of Malaysia
Year	Constituency	Candidate	Votes	Pct.	Opponent(s)	Votes	Pct.	Ballots cast	Majority	Turnout
1995	P151 Tanjong Aru	Yee Moh Chai (PBS)	10,306	43.92%	Joseph Voon Shin Choi (SAPP)	8,788	37.45%	23,463	1,518	64.96%
1995	P151 Tanjong Aru	Yee Moh Chai (PBS)	10,306	43.92%	Fung Ket Wing (DAP)	4,142	17.65%	23,463	1,518	64.96%
1999	P151 Tanjong Aru	Yee Moh Chai (PBS)	11,826	49.22%	Philip Yong Chiew Lip (SAPP)	11,281	46.95%	24,027	545	58.01
1999	P151 Tanjong Aru	Yee Moh Chai (PBS)	11,826	49.22%	Oh Choo Hong (DAP)	534	2.22%	24,027	545	58.01
2004	P172 Kota Kinabalu	Yee Moh Chai (PBS)	15,993	63.77%	Hiew King Cheu (DAP)	5,187	20.68%	25,078	10,806	58.16
2004	P172 Kota Kinabalu	Yee Moh Chai (PBS)	15,993	63.77%	Christina Liew (PKR)	3,492	13.92%	25,078	10,806	58.16

Sabah State Legislative Assembly
Year	Constituency	Candidate	Votes	Pct.	Opponent(s)	Votes	Pct.	Ballots cast	Majority	Turnout
1999	N14 Api-Api	Yee Moh Chai (PBS)	9,146	56.27%	Chau Tet On (MCA)	5,963	36.68%	16,255	3,183	70.35%
1999	N14 Api-Api	Yee Moh Chai (PBS)	9,146	56.27%	Chin Chen Fui (BERSEKUTU)	1,040	6.40%	16,255	3,183	70.35%
2004	N15 Api-Api	Yee Moh Chai (PBS)	4,640	72.31%	Fung Kong Win (DAP)	1,707	26.60%	6,417	2,933	56.44%
2008	N15 Api-Api	Yee Moh Chai (PBS)	3,419	50.04%	Christina Liew (PKR)	3,245	47.50%	6,832	174	63.41%
2013	N15 Api-Api	Yee Moh Chai (PBS)	5,058	41.76%	Christina Liew (PKR)	5,853	48.33%	12,111	795	80.20%
2013	N15 Api-Api	Yee Moh Chai (PBS)	5,058	41.76%	Wong Yit Ming (SAPP)	713	5.89%	12,111	795	80.20%
2013	N15 Api-Api	Yee Moh Chai (PBS)	5,058	41.76%	Felix Chong Kat Fah (ANAK NEGERI)	152	1.26%	12,111	795	80.20%
2013	N15 Api-Api	Yee Moh Chai (PBS)	5,058	41.76%	Marcel Jude (IND)	14	0.12%	12,111	795	80.20%
2018	N15 Api-Api	Yee Moh Chai (PBS)	5,220	35.44%	Christina Liew (PKR)	8,174	55.50%	14,729	2,954	76.40%
2018	N15 Api-Api	Yee Moh Chai (PBS)	5,220	35.44%	Lim Kat Chung (SAPP)	598	4.06%	14,729	2,954	76.40%
2018	N15 Api-Api	Yee Moh Chai (PBS)	5,220	35.44%	Land Lip Fong (ANAK NEGERI)	244	1.66%	14,729	2,954	76.40%
2018	N15 Api-Api	Yee Moh Chai (PBS)	5,220	35.44%	Chan Chee Ching (IND)	94	0.64%	14,729	2,954	76.40%
2020	N20 Api-Api	Yee Moh Chai (PBS)	2,449	20.64%	Christina Liew (PKR)	7,796	65.71%	11,865	5,347	61.96%
2020	N20 Api-Api	Yee Moh Chai (PBS)	2,449	20.64%	Pang Yuk Ming (PCS)	431	3.63%	11,865	5,347	61.96%
2020	N20 Api-Api	Yee Moh Chai (PBS)	2,449	20.64%	Chin Su Phin (LDP)	317	2.67%	11,865	5,347	61.96%
2020	N20 Api-Api	Yee Moh Chai (PBS)	2,449	20.64%	Lo Yau Foh (PPRS)	280	2.36%	11,865	5,347	61.96%
2020	N20 Api-Api	Yee Moh Chai (PBS)	2,449	20.64%	Chong Tze Kiun (PGRS)	97	0.82%	11,865	5,347	61.96%
2020	N20 Api-Api	Yee Moh Chai (PBS)	2,449	20.64%	Sim Sie Hong (IND)	72	0.61%	11,865	5,347	61.96%
2020	N20 Api-Api	Yee Moh Chai (PBS)	2,449	20.64%	Ng Chun Sua (IND)	41	0.34%	11,865	5,347	61.96%
2020	N20 Api-Api	Yee Moh Chai (PBS)	2,449	20.64%	Marcel Jude (IND)	16	0.13%	11,865	5,347	61.96%

== Honours ==
- Sabah
  - Commander of the Order of Kinabalu (PGDK) – Datuk (2004)
  - Grand Commander of the Order of Kinabalu (SPDK) – Datuk Seri Panglima (2021)
