= Renggam (federal constituency) =

Federal constituency in Johor, Malaysia

Johor constituency

Defunct federal constituency
- Legislature: Dewan Rakyat
- Constituency created: 1974
- Constituency abolished: 1986
- First contested: 1974
- Last contested: 1982

Renggam was a federal constituency in Johor, Malaysia, that was represented in the Dewan Rakyat from 1974 to 1986.

The federal constituency was created in the 1974 redistribution and was mandated to return a single member to the Dewan Rakyat under the first past the post voting system.

== History ==
It was abolished in 1986 when it was redistributed.

=== Representation history ===
Members of Parliament for Renggam
Parliament	No	Years	Member	Party	Vote Share
Constituency created from Kluang Utara, Kluang Selatan and Johore Bahru Barat
4th	P107	1974-1978	Chin Hon Ngian (陈汉原)	BN (MCA)	18,865; 71.17%
5th	P107	1978-1982	Chin Hon Ngian (陈汉原)	BN (MCA)	21,861; 63.55%
6th	P107	1982-1986	Chin Hon Ngian (陈汉原)	BN (MCA)	24,529; 60.32%
Constituency abolished, split to Kluang, Sungai Benut, Pulai and Senai

=== State constituency ===
Parliamentary constituency	State constituency						
Parliamentary constituency	1954–59*	1959–1974	1974–1986	1986–1995	1995–2004	2004–2018	2018–present
Renggam			Kulai				
Renggam			Layang-Layang				

=== Historical boundaries ===
State Constituency	Area
State Constituency	1974
Kulai	Gunung Pulai; Kangkar Pulai; Saleng; Senai; Skudai
Layang-Layang	Ayer Bemban; Kelapa Sawit; Kulai; Layang-Layang; Renggam; Sengkang

== Election results ==
Malaysian general election, 1982
Party	Candidate	Votes	%	∆%
BN	Chin Hon Ngian	24,529	60.32	▼3.23
DAP	Yap Ah Ngau	16,138	39.68	▲3.23
Total valid votes		40,667	100.00	
Total rejected ballots		2,282		
Unreturned ballots		0		
Turnout		42,949	78.35	▼1.76
Registered electors		54,815		
Majority		8,391	20.64	▼6.46
BN hold		Swing		

Malaysian general election, 1978
Party	Candidate	Votes	%	∆%
BN	Chin Hon Ngian	21,861	63.55	▼7.62
DAP	Quek Swee Siang	12,537	36.45	▲7.62
Total valid votes		34,398	100.00	
Total rejected ballots		1,922		
Unreturned ballots		0		
Turnout		36,320	80.11	▼0.56
Registered electors		45,340		
Majority		9,324	27.10	▼15.22
BN hold		Swing		

Malaysian general election, 1974
Party	Candidate	Votes	%
BN	Chin Hon Ngian	18,865	71.17
DAP	Liew Satt Yuen	7,642	28.83
Total valid votes		26,507	100.00
Total rejected ballots		1,535	
Unreturned ballots		0	
Turnout		28,042	80.67
Registered electors		34,762	
Majority		11,223	42.32
This was a new constituency created.
