= Christina Liew =

Malaysian politician

Yang Berbahagia Datuk Seri Panglima Christina Liew Chin Jin SPDK PGDK
- 刘静芝

State Minister of Tourism, Culture and Environment of Sabah
- In office 11 January 2023 – 30 November 2025
- Governor: Juhar Mahiruddin (2020–2024); Musa Aman (since 2025)
- Chief Minister: Hajiji Noor
- Assistant: Joniston Bangkuai
- Preceded by: Jafry Arifin
- Constituency: Api-Api
- In office 16 May 2018 – 29 September 2020
- Governor: Juhar Mahiruddin
- Chief Minister: Shafie Apdal
- Assistant: Assaffal P. Alian
- Preceded by: Masidi Manjun
- Succeeded by: Jafry Arifin
- Constituency: Api-Api

Deputy Chief Minister of Sabah III
- In office 16 May 2018 – 29 September 2020 Serving with Wilfred Madius Tangau & Jaujan Sambakong
- Governor: Juhar Mahiruddin
- Chief Minister: Shafie Apdal
- Preceded by: Masidi Manjun
- Succeeded by: Joachim Gunsalam
- Constituency: Api-Api

Member of the Malaysian Parliament for Tawau
- In office 9 May 2018 – 19 November 2022
- Preceded by: Mary Yap Kain Ching (BN–PBS)
- Succeeded by: Lo Su Fui (GRS–PBS)
- Majority: 4,727 (2018)

Member of the Sabah State Legislative Assembly for Api-Api
- In office 5 May 2013 – 29 November 2025
- Preceded by: Yee Moh Chai (BN–PBS)
- Majority: 795 (2013); 2,954 (2018); 5,347 (2020)

1st State Adviser of the People's Justice Party of Sabah
- Incumbent
- Assumed office 29 June 2025 Serving with Abdul Rahman Yakub
- President: Anwar Ibrahim
- State Chairman: Mustapha Sakmud
- Preceded by: Position established

1st State Chairperson of Pakatan Harapan of Sabah
- In office 28 August 2017 – 1 December 2024
- National Chairman: Mahathir Mohamad (2017–2020); Anwar Ibrahim (2020–2024)
- Preceded by: Position established
- Succeeded by: Ewon Benedick

State Chairperson of the People's Justice Party of Sabah
- In office 2 October 2016 – 6 August 2022
- Deputy: Awang Husaini Sahari
- President: Wan Azizah Wan Ismail (2016–2018); Anwar Ibrahim (2018–2022)
- Preceded by: Lajim Ukin
- Succeeded by: Sangkar Rasam

Vice President of Pakatan Harapan
- Incumbent
- Assumed office 11 September 2017 Serving with Chong Chieng Jen & M. Kulasegaran & Salahuddin Ayub (2017–2023) & Donald Peter Mojuntin
- President: Wan Azizah Wan Ismail
- Chairman: Mahathir Mohamad (2017–2020); Anwar Ibrahim (since 2020)

Member of the Central Leadership Council of the People's Justice Party
- In office 20 July 2022 – 24 May 2025
- President: Anwar Ibrahim

Division Chief of the People's Justice Party of Kota Kinabalu
- In office 17 July 2022 – 24 May 2025
- President: Anwar Ibrahim
- Deputy: Zaini Simin
- Succeeded by: Lee Li Mei

Personal details
- Born: Christina Liew Chin Jin; 14 September 1952 (age 74) British Hong Kong
- Citizenship: Malaysia
- Party: United Sabah Party (PBS) (1986–1994); Malaysian Chinese Association (MCA) (1995–1999); People's Justice Party (PKR) (since 2002)
- Other political affiliations: Gagasan Rakyat (GR) (1986–1994); Barisan Nasional (BN) (1995–1999); Barisan Alternatif (BA) (2002–2004); Pakatan Rakyat (PR) (2008–2015); Pakatan Harapan (PH) (since 2015)
- Spouse: Kurnadi Hadikusomo
- Occupation: Politician

Christina Liew

Chinese name
- Traditional Chinese: 劉靜芝
- Simplified Chinese: 刘静芝
Transcriptions
Standard Mandarin
- Hanyu Pinyin: Liú Jìngzhī

Christina Liew (also known as Liew Chin Jin; simplified Chinese: 刘静芝; traditional Chinese: 劉靜芝; pinyin: Liú Jìngzhī) (born 14 September 1952) is a Malaysian politician

She was the Deputy Chief Minister of Sabah III from May 2018 to September 2020, during which time she also served as the State Minister of Tourism, Culture and Environment of Sabah. She returned to the latter role in January 2023 and served until November 2025. She was the second woman to ever serve as deputy chief minister, and the first of Chinese descent.

She was also the Member of the Sabah State Legislative Assembly (MLA) for Api-Api from May 2013 to November 2025, as well as the Member of Parliament (MP) for Tawau from May 2018 to November 2022.

She has held a number of party positions, including as the state chairperson of Sabah for the People's Justice Party (PKR), of which she is currently a vice president as well as an adviser to its Sabah state chapter.

== Personal life ==
Christina was born in British Hong Kong to Hakka Chinese parents. Her parents migrated to Tawau in British Crown Colony of North Borneo when she was a few months old. She is married to a Chinese Indonesian of Hokkien origin who migrated to the United States but travels often to live with her and their children.

== Political career ==
In 1986, Christina stood as a United Sabah Party (PBS) candidate in the Tawau parliamentary seat but lost. After nine years with the party, she left before joining Malaysian Chinese Association (MCA) in 1995 and became the party's women's chief in Sabah until her resignation in January 1999. Due to her frustration with the detention of People's Justice Party (PKR) activists under the Internal Security Act, she joined PKR in 2002. In 2013, Christina was appointed as the deputy chairperson of Sabah PKR. She became the chairman in 2016, but was replaced in 2022. She was appointed an adviser in 2025. She was also appointed chairperson of Pakatan Harapan (PH) in Sabah in 2017.

=== 1986 general election ===
In the 1986 election, PBS fielded her in the Tawau parliamentary against Democratic Action Party (DAP) candidate Samson Chin Chee Tsu but she lost.

=== 2002 general by-election ===
Following the disqualification of Yong Teck Lee as Gaya member of parliament and Likas assemblyman since September 2002 due to being found guilty of corruption according to the Election Offences Act 1954, a by-election was held in that year with Christina contesting the election under PKR. The seat was retained by Yong's Sabah Progressive Party (SAPP) with Liew Teck Chan, while Christina came in third place.

=== 2008 general election ===
In the 2008 election, PKR fielded her to contest the Kota Kinabalu parliamentary seat but she lost to DAP candidate Hiew King Cheu.

=== 2018 general election ===
In the 2018 election, her party fielded her to contest the Tawau parliamentary seat facing the incumbent candidate from United Sabah Party (PBS), Yap Kain Ching. She won and became the new Member of Parliament (MP) for Tawau. She was also appointed as one of the Deputy Chief Ministers and State Tourism Minister for Sabah following the victory of Sabah Heritage Party (WARISAN) and Pakatan Harapan (PH) in the concurrent 2018 Sabah state election, becoming the second woman in the history of Sabah Deputy Chief Minister as well the first Chinese woman to hold the position.

=== 2022 general election ===
In the 2022 general election, PKR fielded her to defend the Tawau seat and seek reelection as the Tawau MP. However, she failed to do so, losing to Lo Su Fui of PBS by a majority of 3,800 votes.

=== 2023 Sabah political crisis ===
In the 2023 Sabah political crisis, Liew, as the Sabah PH Chairperson, led Sabah PH to support Hajiji Noor as the Chief Minister of Sabah, allowing Hajiji to regain the majority support in the Sabah state assembly after the partial withdrawal of support of Barisan Nasional (BN) coalition led by Deputy Chief Minister, State Minister of Works and Lamag MLA Bung Moktar Radin.

Following this, Sabah PH left the state opposition and joined the state government. On 11 January 2023, Hajiji also reshuffled his cabinet and Liew was reappointed as the State Minister of Tourism, Culture and Environment.

== Controversies and issues ==
=== Lawsuit ===
In 2014, Christina was one of three people that were ordered to pay damages to Borneo Samudera Sdn Bhd (BSSB) for unlawfully inducing the Bahagak Smallholders Scheme participants to breach their joint venture agreement (JVA) with BSSB.

== Election results ==
Parliament of Malaysia
Year	Constituency	Candidate	Votes	Pct	Opponent(s)	Votes	Pct	Ballots cast	Majority	Turnout
1986	P151 Tawau	Christina Liew (PBS)	4,814	26.86%	Samson Chin Chee Tsu (DAP)	8,277	46.18%	17,923	3,463	63.12%
1986	P151 Tawau	Christina Liew (PBS)	4,814	26.86%	Abdul Ghapur Salleh (IND)	4,663	26.02%	17,923	3,463	63.12%
2002	P150 Gaya	Christina Liew (keADILan)	2,613	11.82%	Liew Teck Chan (SAPP)	15,639	70.76%	22,100	11,923	44.71%
2002	P150 Gaya	Christina Liew (keADILan)	2,613	11.82%	Hiew King Cheu (DAP)	3,716	16.81%	22,100	11,923	44.71%
2004	P172 Kota Kinabalu	Christina Liew (PKR)	3,492	13.92%	Yee Moh Chai (PBS)	15,993	63.77%	25,078	10,806	58.16%
2004	P172 Kota Kinabalu	Christina Liew (PKR)	3,492	13.92%	Hiew King Cheu (DAP)	5,187	20.68%	25,078	10,806	58.16%
2008	P172 Kota Kinabalu	Christina Liew (PKR)	9,358	33.93%	Hiew King Cheu (DAP)	9,464	34.31%	27,909	106	64.09%
2008	P172 Kota Kinabalu	Christina Liew (PKR)	9,358	33.93%	Liew Teck Chan (SAPP)	8,420	30.53%	27,909	106	64.09%
2008	P172 Kota Kinabalu	Christina Liew (PKR)	9,358	33.93%	Kong Yu Kiong (IND)	341	1.24%	27,909	106	64.09%
2018	P190 Tawau	Christina Liew (PKR)	21,400	48.79%	Yap Kain Ching (PBS)	16,673	38.01%	43,861	4,727	73.20%
2018	P190 Tawau	Christina Liew (PKR)	21,400	48.79%	Mohamad Husain (PAS)	2,518	5.74%	43,861	4,727	73.20%
2018	P190 Tawau	Christina Liew (PKR)	21,400	48.79%	Alizaman Jijurahman (PHRS)	2,162	4.93%	43,861	4,727	73.20%
2022	P190 Tawau	Christina Liew (PKR)	16,065	31.69%	Lo Su Fui (PBS)	19,865	39.19%	50,687	3,800	57.94%
2022	P190 Tawau	Christina Liew (PKR)	16,065	31.69%	Chin Ket Chuin (WARISAN)	11,263	22.22%	50,687	3,800	57.94%
2022	P190 Tawau	Christina Liew (PKR)	16,065	31.69%	Mohd Salleh Bacho (IND)	1,776	3.50%	50,687	3,800	57.94%
2022	P190 Tawau	Christina Liew (PKR)	16,065	31.69%	Herman Amdas (PEJUANG)	1,067	2.11%	50,687	3,800	57.94%
2022	P190 Tawau	Christina Liew (PKR)	16,065	31.69%	Chin Chee Syn (IND)	651	1.28%	50,687	3,800	57.94%

Sabah State Legislative Assembly
Year	Constituency	Candidate	Votes	Pct	Opponent(s)	Votes	Pct	Ballots cast	Majority	Turnout
2004	N16 Luyang	Christina Liew (PKR)	3,711	37.69%	Melanie Chia Chui Ket (SAPP)	5,965	60.58%	9,846	2,254	59.42%
2008	N15 Api-Api	Christina Liew (PKR)	3,245	48.69%	Yee Moh Chai (PBS)	3,419	51.31%	6,832	174	63.41%
2013	N15 Api-Api	Christina Liew (PKR)	5,853	49.64%	Yee Moh Chai (PBS)	5,058	42.90%	12,099	795	80.20%
2013	N15 Api-Api	Christina Liew (PKR)	5,853	49.64%	Wong Yit Ming (SAPP)	713	6.05%	12,099	795	80.20%
2013	N15 Api-Api	Christina Liew (PKR)	5,853	49.64%	Felix Chong Kat Fah (STAR)	152	1.29%	12,099	795	80.20%
2013	N15 Api-Api	Christina Liew (PKR)	5,853	49.64%	Marcel Jude Ms Joseph (IND)	14	0.12%	12,099	795	80.20%
2018	N15 Api-Api	Christina Liew (PKR)	8,174	57.04%	Yee Moh Chai (PBS)	5,220	36.43%	14,729	2,954	76.40%
2018	N15 Api-Api	Christina Liew (PKR)	8,174	57.04%	Lim Kat Chung (SAPP)	598	4.17%	14,729	2,954	76.40%
2018	N15 Api-Api	Christina Liew (PKR)	8,174	57.04%	Len Lip Fong (PKAN)	244	1.70%	14,729	2,954	76.40%
2018	N15 Api-Api	Christina Liew (PKR)	8,174	57.04%	Chan Chee Ching (IND)	94	0.66%	14,729	2,954	76.40%
2020	N20 Api-Api	Christina Liew (PKR)	7,796	67.80%	Yee Moh Chai (PBS)	2,449	21.29%	11,499	5,347	60.05%
2020	N20 Api-Api	Christina Liew (PKR)	7,796	67.80%	Pang Yuk Ming (PCS)	431	3.75%	11,499	5,347	60.05%
2020	N20 Api-Api	Christina Liew (PKR)	7,796	67.80%	Chin Su Phin (LDP)	317	2.76%	11,499	5,347	60.05%
2020	N20 Api-Api	Christina Liew (PKR)	7,796	67.80%	Lo Yau Foh (PPRS)	280	2.43%	11,499	5,347	60.05%
2020	N20 Api-Api	Christina Liew (PKR)	7,796	67.80%	Chong Tze Kiun (GAGASAN)	97	0.84%	11,499	5,347	60.05%
2020	N20 Api-Api	Christina Liew (PKR)	7,796	67.80%	Sim Sie Hong (IND)	72	0.63%	11,499	5,347	60.05%
2020	N20 Api-Api	Christina Liew (PKR)	7,796	67.80%	Ng Chun Sua (IND)	41	0.36%	11,499	5,347	60.05%
2020	N20 Api-Api	Christina Liew (PKR)	7,796	67.80%	Marcel Jude (IND)	16	0.14%	11,499	5,347	60.05%

== Honours ==
- Sabah
  - Grand Commander of the Order of Kinabalu (SPDK) – Datuk Seri Panglima (2024)
  - Commander of the Order of Kinabalu (PGDK) – Datuk (2018)
