= Gaya (federal constituency) =

Sabah constituency

Defunct federal constituency
- Legislature: Dewan Rakyat
- Constituency created: 1974
- Constituency abolished: 2004
- First contested: 1974
- Last contested: 1999

Gaya was a federal constituency in Sabah, Malaysia, that was represented in the Dewan Rakyat from 1974 to 2004.

The federal constituency was created in the 1974 redistribution and was mandated to return a single member to the Dewan Rakyat under the first past the post voting system.

== History ==
It was abolished in 2004 when it was redistributed.

=== Representation history ===
Members of Parliament for Gaya
Parliament	No	Years	Member	Party	Vote Share
Constituency renamed, formerly known as Jesselton (Kota Kinabalu)
4th	P121	1974-1978	Peter Lo Sui Yin (罗思仁)	BN (SCA)	Uncontested
5th	P121	1978-1982	William Lye Chee Hien (黎志贤)	BN (BERJAYA)	11,218; 56.82%
6th	P121	1982-1986	William Lye Chee Hien (黎志贤)	BN (BERJAYA)	13,113; 55.48%
7th	P144	1986-1990	Gerard Math Lee Min (马理民)	DAP	12,388; 74.77%
8th	P144	1990-1995	Philip Yong Chiew Lip (杨秋立)	GR (PBS)	10,675; 56.91%
9th	P150	1995-1999	Philip Yong Chiew Lip (杨秋立)	BN (SAPP)	12,336; 46.67%
10th	P150	1999-2002	Yong Teck Lee (杨德利)	BN (SAPP)	15,315; 56.22%
10th	P150	2002-2004	Liew Teck Chan (刘德泉)	BN (SAPP)	15,639; 71.19%
Constituency abolished, split into Tuaran, Penampang, Putatan, Kota Kinabalu and Sepanggar

=== State constituency ===
Parliamentary constituency	State constituency					
Parliamentary constituency	1967–1974	1974–1985	1985–1995	1995–2004	2004–2020	2020–present
Gaya			Api-Api			
Gaya				Inanam		
Gaya		Kota Kinabalu				
Gaya		Likas				
Gaya		Tanjong Aru				

=== Historical boundaries ===
State Constituency	Area		
State Constituency	1974	1984	1994
Api-Api		Api-Api; Damai; Kota Kinabalu; Luyang; Taman Rafflesia	
Inanam			Bukit Kokol; Bukit Padang; Bukit Sepanggar; Inanam; Minintod
Kota Kinabalu	Api-Api; Kota Kinabalu; Sadong Jaya; Sembulan; Sepelang		
Likas	Karamunsing; Kolombong; Likas; Luyang; Pulau Gaya	Kolombong; Likas; Pulau Gaya; Taman Happy Garden; Taman Kemajuan	Kolombong; Likas; Menggatal; Pulau Gaya; Sepanggar
Tanjong Aru	Kampung Nosoob Baru; Kepayan; Lido; Putatan Ramayah; Tanjung Aru		

== Election results ==
Malaysian general by-election, 12 October 2002 The by-election was called due to the disqualification of incumbent, Yong Teck Lee after being found guilty of an illegal billboard.
Party	Candidate	Votes	%	∆%
BN	Liew Teck Chan	15,639	71.19	▲14.97
DAP	Hiew King Cheu	3,716	16.92	▲16.92
PKR	Christina Liew	2,613	11.89	▲11.89
Total valid votes		21,968	100.00	
Total rejected ballots		132		
Unreturned ballots		0		
Turnout		22,100	44.71	▼13.43
Registered electors		49,427		
Majority		11,923	52.27	▲39.16
BN hold		Swing		

Malaysian general election, 1999
Party	Candidate	Votes	%	∆%
BN	Yong Teck Lee	15,315	56.22	▲9.55
PBS	Johnny Goh Chin Lok	11,198	41.11	▼4.76
PAS	Hamzah Abdullah	729	2.68	▲2.68
Total valid votes		27,242	100.00	
Total rejected ballots		149		
Unreturned ballots		14		
Turnout		27,405	58.14	▼8.52
Registered electors		47,135		
Majority		4,117	15.11	▲14.31
BN hold		Swing		

Malaysian general election, 1995
Party	Candidate	Votes	%	∆%
BN	Philip Yong Chiew Lip	12,336	46.67	▲46.67
PBS	Johnny Goh Chin Lok	12,127	45.87	▲45.87
DAP	Oswald Sipain Mojingol	1,541	5.83	▲5.83
Independent	Mohd Naser Mohd Noor	431	1.63	▲1.63
Total valid votes		26,435	100.00	
Total rejected ballots		295		
Unreturned ballots		2		
Turnout		26,732	66.66	▲12.59
Registered electors		40,100		
Majority		209	0.80	▼13.02
BN gain from PBS		Swing		?

Malaysian general election, 1990
Party	Candidate	Votes	%	∆%
PBS	Philip Yong Chiew Lip	10,675	56.91	▲56.91
DAP	Fung Ket Wing	8,083	43.09	▼31.68
Total valid votes		18,758	100.00	
Total rejected ballots		375		
Unreturned ballots		0		
Turnout		19,133	54.07	▼3.50
Registered electors		35,387		
Majority		2,592	13.82	▼35.72
PBS gain from DAP		Swing		?

Malaysian general election, 1986
Party	Candidate	Votes	%	∆%
DAP	Gerard Math Lee Min	12,388	74.77	▲47.21
BN	Joseph Chia Swee Chung	4,180	25.23	▼30.25
Total valid votes		16,568	100.00	
Total rejected ballots		56		
Unreturned ballots		0		
Turnout		16,624	57.57	▼2.91
Registered electors		28,878		
Majority		8,208	49.54	▲21.62
DAP gain from BN		Swing		?

Malaysian general election, 1982
Party	Candidate	Votes	%	∆%
BN	William Lye Chee Hien	13,113	55.48	▲1.34
DAP	Oh Choo Hong	6,514	27.56	▲27.56
SCCP	Tan Ching Chee	4,008	16.96	▲16.96
Total valid votes		23,635	100.00	
Total rejected ballots		320		
Unreturned ballots		0		
Turnout		23,955	60.48	▼2.10
Registered electors		39,606		
Majority		6,599	27.92	▲11.12
BN hold		Swing		

Malaysian general election, 1978
Party	Candidate	Votes	%	∆%
BN	William Lye Chee Hien	11,218	56.82	▲56.82
Independent	Chin Nyuk Fatt	7,902	40.02	▲40.02
Parti Sabah Demokratik Rakyat	Musa Taulani	624	3.16	▲3.16
Total valid votes		19,744	100.00	
Total rejected ballots		339		
Unreturned ballots		0		
Turnout		20,083	62.58	
Registered electors		32,092		
Majority		3,316	16.80	
BN hold		Swing		

Malaysian general election, 1974
Party	Candidate	Votes	%	∆%
On the nomination day, Peter Lo Sui Yin won uncontested.
BN	Peter Lo Sui Yin			
Total valid votes			100.00	
Total rejected ballots				
Unreturned ballots				
Turnout				
Registered electors		20,903		
Majority				
This was a new constituency created.
