= Sarawak Chinese Association =

Sarawak Chinese Association Persatuan Cina Sarawak
- Abbreviation: SCA
- Founders: English-educated Chinese businessmen leaders largely from Kuching and Sibu.
- Founded: July 1962
- Dissolved: 1973
- Headquarters: Kuching, Sarawak
- National affiliation: Sarawak Alliance (1962–1973)

The Sarawak Chinese Association (Malay: Persatuan Cina Sarawak, SCA) was a political party in the Sarawak state of Malaysia.

== History ==
The party was established in July 1962 by a group of mostly English-educated Chinese businessmen, with the leaders largely from Kuching and Sibu. One of them is Teo Kui Seng after he leaving Sarawak United People's Party. Based on the Malayan Chinese Association, its membership was limited to ethnic Chinese residents of Sarawak and the aim of its founders was to present a less radical Chinese viewpoint than that offered by the Sarawak United Peoples' Party (SUPP).

A member of the Sarawak branch of the Alliance Party, it won two seats in the 1969 general elections, and two of the three seats it contested in the 1970 state elections.

The party was dissolved in 1973 as a result of an agreement between the Alliance and the SUPP.

== Government offices ==
=== State governments ===
- Sarawak (1962–1973)

Note: bold as Premier/Chief Minister, italic as junior partner

== Election results ==
=== General elections ===
Election	Seats	Status
1964	3 / 159	Governing coalition
1969	2 / 144	Governing coalition

=== State elections ===
Sarawak State Legislative Assembly
Election	Votes		Seats			Position (Note: As part of electoral coalition.)	Status
Election	Count	%	Result	Won / contested	+/–	Position	Status
1969/1970	29,768	11.9	4 / 48	4 / 12	▲4	1st (Sarawak Alliance)	Alliance–SUPP–Pesaka
