= Women in the Dewan Rakyat =

Women in politics

There have been 97 women in the Dewan Rakyat since the establishment of the Parliament of Malaysia. In the 15th Malaysian Parliament, there are 28 female representatives, or 13.5% of the body.

Women have had the right to both vote and sit in parliament since 1959 and all states and territories have been represented by a woman in the Dewan Rakyat.

== List of female members ==
This is a complete list of women who have served as members of the Dewan Rakyat, ordered by seniority. This list includes women who served in the past and who continue to serve in the present.

Party	Member	Federal Constituency	Year elected	Year left	Reason
Alliance (UMNO)	Fatimah Hashim	Jitra-Padang Terap	1959	1974	Retired
PMIP	Khadijah Sidek	Dungun	1959	1964	Defeated
Alliance (UMNO)	Zainon Munshi Sulaiman	Pontian Selatan	1959	1964	Retired
Sarawak Alliance (BUMIPUTERA)	Ajibah Abol	Nominated	1963	1969	Retired
Alliance (UMNO)	Fatimah Abdul Majid	Johore Bahru Timor	1964	1969	Transferred
Alliance (UMNO)	Fatimah Abdul Majid	Batu Pahat Dalam	1969	1974	Transferred
BN (UMNO)	Fatimah Abdul Majid	Semerah	1974	1978	Retired
Alliance (UMNO)	Bibi Aishah Hamid Don	Kulim Utara	1969	1974	Retired
BN (UMNO)	Wan Zainab M. A. Bakar	Sungei Patani	1974	1986	Retired
BN (UMNO)	Tengku Noor Asiah Tengku Ahmad	Tumpat	1974	1982	Retired
BN (UMNO)	Oon Zariah Abu Bakar	Kuala Kangsar	1974	1978	Retired
BN (MCA)	Rosemary Chow Poh Kheng	Selayang	1975	1978	Transferred
BN (MCA)	Rosemary Chow Poh Kheng	Ulu Langat	1978	1986	Retired
BN (UMNO)	Aishah Ghani	Kuala Langat	1974	1986	Retired
BN (UMNO)	Yong Fatimah Mohd. Razali	Kuala Kangsar	1978	1982	Retired
BN (UMNO)	Rafidah Aziz	Selayang	1978	1982	Transferred
BN (UMNO)	Rafidah Aziz	Kuala Kangsar	1982	2013	Retired
BN (UMNO)	Shariffah Dorah Syed Mohammed	Semerah	1978	1986	Transferred
BN (UMNO)	Shariffah Dorah Syed Mohammed	Parit Sulong	1986	1990	Retired
BN (UMNO)	Zaleha Ismail	Tanjong Karang	1982	1986	Transferred
BN (UMNO)	Zaleha Ismail	Selayang	1986	1995	Transferred
BN (UMNO)	Zaleha Ismail	Gombak	1995	2004	Retired
BN (UMNO)	Rahmah Othman	Selayang	1982	1986	Transferred
BN (UMNO)	Rahmah Othman	Shah Alam	1986	1990	Defeated
BN (UMNO)	Napsiah Omar	Kuala Pilah	1982	1995	Retired
BN (MCA)	Teng Gaik Kwan	Raub	1986	1999	Retired
BN (UMNO)	Siti Zaharah Sulaiman	Mentakab	1986	1995	Transferred
BN (UMNO)	Siti Zaharah Sulaiman	Paya Besar	1995	2008	Retired
BN (MCA)	Ling Chooi Sieng	Kluang	1986	1990	Transferred
BN (MCA)	Ling Chooi Sieng	Lumut	1990	1995	Retired
BN (UMNO)	Siti Zainabon Abu Bakar	Tebrau	1986	1999	Retired
BN (MCA)	Lim Lay Hoon	Padang Serai	1990	1999	Retired
S46	Ilani Isahak	Kota Bharu	1990	1999	Defeated
BN (UMNO)	Rakibah Abdul Manap	Shah Alam	1990	1995	Retired
BN (PBB)	Rohani Abdul Karim	Santubong	1990	2004	Transferred
GPS (PBB)	Rohani Abdul Karim	Batang Lupar	2004	2022	Retired
BN (UMNO)	Ainon Khairiyah Mohd. Abas	Parit	1995	1999	Retired
BN (MIC)	G. Leelavathi	Kapar	1995	1999	Retired
BN (MCA)	Tan Yee Kew	Klang	1995	2008	Not Contested
BN (UMNO)	Seripah Noli Syed Hussin	Sepang	1995	2004	Retired
BN (UMNO)	Shahrizat Abdul Jalil	Lembah Pantai	1995	2008	Defeated
BN (SAPP)	Chua Soon Bui	Tawau	1995	1999	Not Contested
BN (PBB)	Sukinam Domo	Batang Sadong	1995	2004	Retired
BN (UMNO)	Mastika Junaidah Husin	Arau	1999	2004	Retired
BN (MCA)	Lim Bee Kau	Padang Serai	1999	2008	Retired
KeADILan	Wan Azizah Wan Ismail	Permatang Pauh	1999	2008	Resigned
PKR	Wan Azizah Wan Ismail	Permatang Pauh	1999	2008	Resigned
DAP	Chong Eng	Bukit Mertajam	1999	2013	Not Contested
BN (UMNO)	Khamsiyah Yeop	Gerik	1999	2004	Transferred
BN (UMNO)	Khamsiyah Yeop	Lenggong	2004	2008	Retired
DAP	Fong Po Kuan	Batu Gajah	1999	2013	Retired
BN (MCA)	Ng Yen Yen	Raub	1999	2013	Retired
BN (MCA)	Chew Mei Fun	Petaling Jaya Utara	1999	2008	Defeated
BN (MIC)	P. Komala Devi	Kapar	1999	2008	Defeated
PH (DAP)	Teresa Kok Suh Sim	Seputeh	1999		Serving
BN (UMNO)	Napsiah Omar	Kuala Pilah	1999	2004	Retired
BN (UMNO)	Robia Kosai	Muar	1999	2004	Retired
BN (UMNO)	Mashitah Ibrahim	Baling	2004	2008	Retired
PAS	Kalthom Othman	Pasir Puteh	2004	2008	Retired
BN (GERAKAN)	Tan Lian Hoe	Bukit Gantang	2004	2008	Transferred
BN (GERAKAN)	Tan Lian Hoe	Gerik	2008	2013	Defeated
BN (UMNO)	Noriah Kasnon	Sungai Besar	2004	2016	Death
BN (UMNO)	Rozaidah Talib	Ampang	2004	2008	Retired
BN (UMNO)	Azalina Othman Said	Pengerang	2004		Serving
BN (MCA)	Tan Ah Eng	Gelang Patah	2004	2013	Retired
BN (UMNO)	Rosnah Abdul Rashid Shirlin	Papar	2004	2018	Defeated
PN (PAS)	Siti Zailah Mohd Yusoff	Rantau Panjang	2008		Serving
PH (PKR)	Fuziah Salleh	Kuantan	2008	2022	Defeated
PH (PKR)	Zuraida Kamaruddin	Ampang	2008	2020	Transferred Party
PN (BERSATU)	Zuraida Kamaruddin	Ampang	2020	2022	Transferred Party
PBM	Zuraida Kamaruddin	Ampang	2022	2022	Defeated
PH (DAP)	Teo Nie Ching	Serdang	2008	2013	Transferred
PH (DAP)	Teo Nie Ching	Kulai	2013		Serving
PAS	Siti Mariah Mahmud	Kota Raja	2008	2018	Not Contested
PH (AMANAH)	Siti Mariah Mahmud	Kota Raja	2008	2018	Not Contested
PAS	Lo' Lo' Mohd Ghazali	Titiwangsa	2008	2011	Death
PH (PKR)	Nurul Izzah Anwar	Lembah Pantai	2008	2018	Transferred
PH (PKR)	Nurul Izzah Anwar	Permatang Pauh	2018	2022	Defeated
BN (UMNO)	Noraini Ahmad	Parit Sulong	2008		Serving
BN (UMNO)	Halimah Mohd Sadique	Tenggara	2008	2018	Transferred
BN (UMNO)	Halimah Mohd Sadique	Kota Tinggi	2018	2022	Not Contested
BN (SAPP)	(Chua Soon Bui)	Tawau	2008	2013	Defeated
SAPP	(Chua Soon Bui)	Tawau	2008	2013	Defeated
GPS (PBB)	Nancy Shukri	Batang Sadong	2008	2022	Transferred
GPS (PBB)	Nancy Shukri	Santubong	2022		Serving
BN (PBB)	Norah Abdul Rahman	Tanjong Manis	2008	2018	Not Contested
BN (PBS)	Linda Tsen Thau Lin	Batu Sapi	2010	2018	Defeated
PH (DAP)	Kasthuriraani Patto	Batu Kawan	2013	2022	Not Contested
BN (UMNO)	Mas Ermieyati Samsudin	Masjid Tanah	2013	2018	Transferred Party
PN (BERSATU)	Mas Ermieyati Samsudin	Masjid Tanah	2018		Serving
BN (UMNO)	Normala Abdul Samad	Pasir Gudang	2013	2018	Not Contested
BN (UMNO)	Azizah Mohd Dun	Beaufort	2004	2008	Not Contested
BN (UMNO)	Azizah Mohd Dun	Beaufort	2013	2018	Transferred Party
PN (BERSATU)	Azizah Mohd Dun	Beaufort	2019	2022	Not Contested
BN (PBS)	Mary Yap Kain Ching	Tawau	2013	2018	Defeated
GPS (PBB)	Rubiah Wang	Kota Samarahan	2013		Serving
PH (DAP)	Alice Lau Kiong Yieng	Lanang	2013		Serving
PH (PKR)	Wan Azizah Wan Ismail	Permatang Pauh	2015	2018	Transferred
PH (PKR)	Wan Azizah Wan Ismail	Pandan	2018	2022	Transferred
PH (PKR)	Wan Azizah Wan Ismail	Bandar Tun Razak	2022		Serving
BN (UMNO)	Mastura Mohd Yazid	Kuala Kangsar	2016	2022	Not Contested
PH (PKR)	Nor Azrina Surip	Merbok	2018	2022	Defeated
PH (PKR)	June Leow Hsiad Hui	Hulu Selangor	2018	2022	Not Contested
PH (PKR)	Maria Chin Abdullah	Petaling Jaya	2018	2022	Not Contested
PH (PKR)	Tan Yee Kew	Wangsa Maju	2018	2022	Not Contested
PH (DAP)	Hannah Yeoh Tseow Suan	Segambut	2018		Serving
PN (BERSATU)	Rina Harun	Titiwangsa	2018	2022	Defeated
PH (PKR)	Rosnah Aluai	Tangga Batu	2018	2022	Defeated
PH (PKR)	Natrah Ismail	Sekijang	2018	2022	Not Contested
PH (DAP)	Yeo Bee Yin	Bakri	2018	2022	Transferred
PH (DAP)	Yeo Bee Yin	Puchong	2022		Serving
PH (DAP)	Wong Shu Qi	Kluang	2018		Serving
WARISAN	Isnaraissah Munirah Majilis	Kota Belud	2018		Serving
PH (DAP)	Noorita Sual	Tenom	2018	2022	Defeated
PH (PKR)	Christina Liew Chin Jin	Tawau	2018	2022	Defeated
GPS (PBB)	Hanifah Hajar Taib	Mukah	2018		Serving
PH (DAP)	Vivian Wong Shir Yee	Sandakan	2019		Serving
PN (PAS)	Mumtaz Md. Nawi	Tumpat	2022		Serving
PN (PAS)	Siti Mastura Mohamad	Kepala Batas	2022		Serving
PH (PKR)	Fadhlina Sidek	Nibong Tebal	2022		Serving
PH (DAP)	Lim Hui Ying	Tanjong	2022		Serving
PH (DAP)	Syerleena Abdul Rashid	Bukit Bendera	2022		Serving
PN (PAS)	Salmiah Mohd Nor	Temerloh	2022		Serving
PH (DAP)	Young Syefura Othman	Bentong	2022		Serving
PH (PKR)	Rodziah Ismail	Ampang	2022		Serving
PN (PAS)	Halimah Ali	Kapar	2022		Serving
PH (AMANAH)	Aiman Athirah Sabu	Sepang	2022		Serving
PH (PKR)	Zaliha Mustafa	Sekijang	2022		Serving
BN (UMNO)	Siti Aminah Aching	Beaufort	2022		Serving
GPS (PBB)	Rodiyah Sapiee	Batang Sadong	2022		Serving
GPS (PBB)	Doris Sophia Brodi	Sri Aman	2022		Serving

== Proportion of women in the Dewan Rakyat ==
Parliament	Number of women members	Percentage of women members	Total members (including men)
1st	3	2.88%	104
1st (after 1963)	4	2.52%	159
2nd	3	1.89%	159
2nd (after 1965)	3	2.08%	144
3rd	3	2.08%	144
4th	5	3.25%	154
4th (after 1975)	6	3.90%	154
5th	7	4.55%	154
6th	8	5.19%	154
7th	9	5.08%	177
8th	11	6.11%	180
9th	15	7.81%	192
10th	20	10.36%	193.
11th	23	10.50%	219.
12th	25	11.26%	222.
12th (after 2008)	24	10.81%	222.
12th (after 2010)	25	11.26%	222.
12th (after 2011)	24	10.81%	222.
13th	23	10.36%	222.
13th (after 2015)	24	10.81%	222
13th (after 2016)	23	10.36%	222
13th (after 2016)	24	10.81%	222
14th	32	14.41%	222
14th (after 2019)	33	14.86%	222
15th	30	13.51%	222
