= List of Malaysian Parliaments =

This is a complete list of the individual parliaments of the Parliament of Malaysia.

- 1st Parliament of the Federation of Malaya: 1959–1963
- 1st Malaysian Parliament: 1963–1964
- 2nd Malaysian Parliament: 1964–1969
- 3rd Malaysian Parliament: 1971–1974
- 4th Malaysian Parliament: 1974–1978
- 5th Malaysian Parliament: 1978–1982
- 6th Malaysian Parliament: 1982–1986
- 7th Malaysian Parliament: 1986–1990
- 8th Malaysian Parliament: 1990–1995
- 9th Malaysian Parliament: 1995–1999
- 10th Malaysian Parliament: 1999–2004
- 11th Malaysian Parliament: 2004–2008
- 12th Malaysian Parliament: 2008–2013
- 13th Malaysian Parliament: 2013–2018
- Members of the Dewan Rakyat, 14th Malaysian Parliament: 2018–2022
- Members of the Dewan Rakyat, 15th Malaysian Parliament: 2022–present
