= 1959 Plentong by-election =

- 23 November 1959

Plentong seat in Johor State Legislative Assembly
	All	SF
Candidate	Fatimah Abdul Majed	Mat Zain
Party	UMNO	Lab
Alliance	Alliance	SF
Popular vote	3,934	1,614
Percentage	NA	NA
MLA before election
Mohamed Noah Omar
Alliance (UMNO)
Elected MLA
Fatimah Abdul Majid
Alliance (UMNO)

The Plentong by-election was a state assembly by-election that was held on 23 November 1959 in the state of Johor, Malaysia. The Plentong seat fell vacant following the resignation of its UMNO MLA Mohamed Noah Omar due to his appointment as the first Speaker of the Dewan Rakyat. He won the seat in 1959 Malayan general election, with a 3,434 majority.

Fatimah Abdul Majid of Alliance, won the by election, defeating Mat Zain of Socialist Front with a huge majority of 2,320 votes.

== Nomination ==
Polling day was fixed on 23 November 1959. On nomination day, two candidates were confirmed. Alliance nominated their Women leader and former Johor Bahru council president, Fatimah Abdul Majid. Socialist Front nominated Mat Zain. Parti Negara did not contest and supported SF candidate.

== Results ==
Malaysian general by-election, 23 November 1959: Plentong Upon the resignation of incumbent, Mohamed Noah Omar
Party	Candidate	Votes	%	∆%
Alliance	Fatimah Abdul Majid	3,934	NA	
Socialist Front	Mat Zain	1,614	NA	
Total valid votes		NA	NA	
Total rejected ballots			NA	
Unreturned ballots		0		
Turnout				
Registered electors				
Majority		2,320	NA	NA
Alliance hold		Swing		
