= Perlis Utara =

Perlis constituency

Defunct federal constituency
- Legislature: Dewan Rakyat
- Constituency created: 1958
- Constituency abolished: 1974
- First contested: 1959
- Last contested: 1969

Perlis Utara was a federal constituency in Perlis, Malaysia, that was represented in the Dewan Rakyat from 1959 to 1974.

The federal constituency was created in the 1974 redistribution and was mandated to return a single member to the Dewan Rakyat under the first past the post voting system.

== History ==
It was abolished in 1974 when it was redistributed.

=== Representation history ===
Members of Parliament for Perlis Utara
Parliament	No	Years	Member	Party	Vote Share
Constituency created from Perlis
Parliament of the Federation of Malaya
1st	P001	1959–1963	Othman Abdullah (عثمان عبدالله)	Alliance (UMNO)	9,638; 62.48%
Parliament of Malaysia
1st	P001	1963–1964	Othman Abdullah (عثمان عبدالله)	Alliance (UMNO)	9,638; 62.48%
2nd	P001	1964–1969	Othman Abdullah (عثمان عبدالله)	Alliance (UMNO)	12,521; 67.17%
		1969–1971	Parliament was suspended		
3rd	P001	1971–1973	Othman Abdullah (عثمان عبدالله)	Alliance (UMNO)	10,763; 49.53%
3rd	P001	1973–1974	Othman Abdullah (عثمان عبدالله)	BN (UMNO)	10,763; 49.53%
Constituency abolished, split into Kangar and Arau

=== State constituency ===
Parliamentary constituency	State constituency						
Parliamentary constituency	1955–1959*	1959–1974	1974–1986	1986–1995	1995–2004	2004–2018	2018–present
Perlis Utara		Bandar Kangar					
Perlis Utara		Bintong					
Perlis Utara		Kaki Bukit					
Perlis Utara		Mata Ayer					
Perlis Utara		Paya					
Perlis Utara		Sena					

=== Historical boundaries ===
State Constituency	Area
State Constituency	1959
Bandar Kangar	Alor Pulai; Kampung Batu Dua; Kampung Salang; Kangar; Seriab
Bintong	Bintong; Kampung Syed Omar; Kurong Batang; Sungai Batu Pahat; Tebing Tinggi
Kaki Bukit	Kaki Bukit; Beseri; Bukit Chabang; Wang Kelian; Padang Besar
Mata Ayer	Balik Bukit; Chuping; Kampung Bukit Jernih; Kampung Perit; Mata Ayer
Paya	Alor Sena; Kampung Batu Dua; Kampung Padang Pauh; Kampung Paya; Santan
Sena	Jejawi; Kampung Kubang Gajah; Sena; Taman Embun; Taman Sri Bakong

== Election results ==
Malaysian general election, 1969: Perlis Utara
Party	Candidate	Votes	%	∆%
Alliance	Othman Abdullah	10,763	49.53	▼17.64
PMIP	Taharim Ariffin	8,057	37.08	▲4.25
Parti Rakyat Malaysia	Kassim Ahmad	2,910	13.39	▲13.39
Total valid votes		21,730	100.00	
Total rejected ballots		981		
Unreturned ballots		0		
Turnout		22,711	81.31	▼1.50
Registered electors		27,932		
Majority		2,706	12.45	▼21.89
Alliance hold		Swing		

Malaysian general election, 1964: Perlis Utara
Party	Candidate	Votes	%	∆%
Alliance	Othman Abdullah	12,521	67.17	▲4.69
PMIP	Ismail Mohamad	6,119	32.83	▼4.69
Total valid votes		18,640	100.00	
Total rejected ballots		721		
Unreturned ballots		0		
Turnout		19,361	82.81	▲3.31
Registered electors		23,379		
Majority		6,402	34.34	▲9.38
Alliance hold		Swing		

Malayan general election, 1959: Perlis Utara
Party	Candidate	Votes	%
Alliance	Othman Abdullah	9,638	62.48
PMIP	Abu Bakar Hamzah	5,787	37.52
Total valid votes		15,425	100.00
Total rejected ballots		126	
Unreturned ballots		0	
Turnout		15,551	79.50
Registered electors		19,560	
Majority		3,851	24.96
This was a new constituency created.
