= Penang Selatan =

Penang constituency

Defunct federal constituency
- Legislature: Dewan Rakyat
- Constituency created: 1958
- Constituency abolished: 1974
- First contested: 1959
- Last contested: 1969

Penang Selatan was a federal constituency in Penang, Malaysia, that was represented in the Dewan Rakyat from 1959 to 1974.

The federal constituency was created in the 1974 redistribution and was mandated to return a single member to the Dewan Rakyat under the first past the post voting system.

== History ==
The Penang Selatan parliamentary constituency comprises the predominantly rural areas of Balik Pulau, Bayan Lepas, Sungei Nibong and the urban enclaves of Gelugor and Jelutong. In terms of geographic size, Penang Selatan covers the widest area compared to the other parliamentary constituencies on Penang Island. While the rural areas of the constituency are populated by Alliance controlled Malays, the urban areas of Jelutong and Gelugor are mainly non Malay domains. The first general election of 1959 saw the Alliance candidate, Ismail Idris winning by a thin margin, mainly due to the personality of the losing candidate who was once a Mayor of Georgetown. In 1964, the Alliance candidate Ismail Idris, was re-elected by a thumping majority. However, towards the late 60s, racial segregation and sentiments had reached a peak which caused the Alliance to lose ground in Penang in favor of opposition parties. In the 1969 general elections, future Chief Minister, Lim Chong Eu and his Gerakan party swept power in Penang. Most of the Alliance parliamentary and State Assembly candidates lost their seats. As a result of a national delineation process, the parliamentary constituency of Penang Selatan was abolished in 1974 and was renamed as Balik Pulau parliamentary constituency. Gelugor and Jelutong was regrouped into the newly formed Jelutong parliamentary constituency.

=== Representation history ===
Members of Parliament for Penang Selatan
Parliament	No	Years	Member	Party	Vote Share
Constituency created from Penang Island and George Town
Parliament of the Federation of Malaya
1st	P035	1959–1963	Ismail Idris (اسماعيل إدريس)	Alliance (UMNO)	9,821; 43.99%
Parliament of Malaysia
1st	P035	1963–1964	Ismail Idris (اسماعيل إدريس)	Alliance (UMNO)	9,821; 43.99%
2nd	P035	1964–1969	Ismail Idris (اسماعيل إدريس)	Alliance (UMNO)	16,088; 48.15%
		1969–1971	Parliament was suspended		
3rd	P035	1971–1973	Thomas Gabriel Selvaraj (தாமஸ் கேப்ரியல் செல்வராஜ்)	GERAKAN	20,196; 58.72%
3rd	P035	1973–1974	Thomas Gabriel Selvaraj (தாமஸ் கேப்ரியல் செல்வராஜ்)	BN (GERAKAN)	20,196; 58.72%
Constituency abolished, split into Balik Pulau, Bukit Bendera and Jelutong

=== State constituency ===
Parliamentary constituency	State constituency						
Parliamentary constituency	1955–1959*	1959–1974	1974–1986	1986–1995	1995–2004	2004–2018	2018–present
Penang Selatan		Balik Pulau					
Penang Selatan		Bayan Lepas					
Penang Selatan		Glugor					
Penang Selatan		Jelutong					

=== Historical boundaries ===
State Constituency	Area
State Constituency	1959
Balik Pulau	Balik Pulau; Kampung Perlis; Pondok Upih; Pulau Betong; Titi Teras
Bayan Lepas	Batu Maung; Bayan Baru; Bayan Lepas; Sungai Ara; Teluk Kumbar
Glugor	Batu Uban; Bukit Tunku Kudin; Island Glades; Paya Terubong; Relau
Jelutong	Batu Lanchang; Bukit Dumbar; Islanda Park; Jalan Van Praagh; Jelutong

== Election results ==
Malaysian general election, 1969: Penang Selatan
Party	Candidate	Votes	%	∆%
GERAKAN	Thomas Gabriel Selvaraj	20,196	58.72	▲58.72
Alliance	Ismail Idris	14,196	41.28	▼6.87
Total valid votes		34,392	100.00	
Total rejected ballots		2,017		
Unreturned ballots		0		
Turnout		36,409	76.71	▼8.32
Registered electors		47,464		
Majority		6,000	17.44	▲6.92
GERAKAN gain from Alliance		Swing		?

Malaysian general election, 1964: Penang Selatan
Party	Candidate	Votes	%	∆%
Alliance	Ismail Idris	16,088	48.15	▲4.16
Socialist Front	Abu Bakar Hashim	12,571	37.63	▼5.20
UDP	Lim Mee Lee	4,752	14.22	▲14.22
Total valid votes		33,411	100.00	
Total rejected ballots		848		
Unreturned ballots		0		
Turnout		34,259	85.03	▲12.31
Registered electors		40,291		
Majority		3,517	10.52	▲9.36
Alliance hold		Swing		

Malayan general election, 1959: Penang Selatan
Party	Candidate	Votes	%
Alliance	Ismail Idris	9,821	43.99
Socialist Front	D. S. Ramanathan	9,563	42.83
PMIP	Omar Long	2,585	11.58
Independent	Mansor	359	1.61
Total valid votes		22,328	100.00
Total rejected ballots		144	
Unreturned ballots		0	
Turnout		22,472	72.72
Registered electors		30,903	
Majority		258	1.16
This was a new constituency created.
