= Muar Utara (federal constituency) =

Johor constituency

Defunct federal constituency
- Legislature: Dewan Rakyat
- Constituency created: 1955
- Constituency abolished: 1974
- First contested: 1955
- Last contested: 1969

Muar Utara was a federal constituency in Johor, Malaysia, that was represented in the Dewan Rakyat from 1955 to 1974.

The federal constituency was created in the 1955 redistribution and was mandated to return a single member to the Dewan Rakyat under the first past the post voting system.

== History ==
It was abolished in 1974 when it was redistributed.

=== Representation history ===
Members of Parliament for Muar Utara
Parliament	No	Years	Member	Party
Constituency created
Federal Legislative Council
1st		1955-1959	Hassan Yunus (حسن يونس)	Alliance (UMNO)
Parliament of the Federation of Malaya
1st	P104	1959-1963	Ahmad Arshad (احمد ارشد)	Alliance (UMNO)
Parliament of Malaysia
1st	P104	1963-1964	Ahmad Arshad (احمد ارشد)	Alliance (UMNO)
2nd	P104	1964-1969	Ahmad Arshad (احمد ارشد)	Alliance (UMNO)
		1969-1971	Parliament was suspended	
3rd	P104	1971-1973	Ahmad Arshad (احمد ارشد)	Alliance (UMNO)
3rd	P104	1973-1974	Ahmad Arshad (احمد ارشد)	BN (UMNO)
Constituency abolished, split into Segamat, Ledang and Pagoh

=== State constituency ===
Parliamentary constituency	State constituency						
Parliamentary constituency	1954–59*	1959–1974	1974–1986	1986–1995	1995–2004	2004–2018	2018–present
Muar Utara	Muar Central						
Muar Utara		Serom					
Muar Utara	Tangkak						

=== Historical boundaries ===
State Constituency	Area
State Constituency	1959
Serom	Bukit Gambir; Bukit Kangkar; Sengkang; Serom; Sungai Mati
Tangkak	Ledang; Kampung Melayu Raya; Kundang; Sagil; Tangkak

== Election results ==
Malaysian general election, 1969
Party	Candidate	Votes	%	∆%
On the nomination day, Ahmad Arshad won uncontested.
Alliance	Ahmad Arshad			
Total valid votes			100.00	
Total rejected ballots				
Unreturned ballots				
Turnout				
Registered electors		30,264		
Majority				
Alliance hold		Swing		

Malaysian general election, 1964
Party	Candidate	Votes	%	∆%
Alliance	Ahmad Arshad	16,717	81.18	▼2.24
Socialist Front	Abdul Hamid Hassan	3,876	18.82	▲18.82
Total valid votes		20,593	100.00	
Total rejected ballots		973		
Unreturned ballots		0		
Turnout		21,566	79.80	▲7.46
Registered electors		27,024		
Majority		12,841	62.36	▼4.48
Alliance hold		Swing		

Malayan general election, 1959
Party	Candidate	Votes	%	∆%
Alliance	Ahmad Arshad	12,744	83.42	▼1.11
National Party	Nasir Abdullah	2,533	16.58	▲1.11
Total valid votes		15,277	100.00	
Total rejected ballots		284		
Unreturned ballots		0		
Turnout		15,561	72.34	▼9.66
Registered electors		21,510		
Majority		10,211	66.84	▼2.22
Alliance hold		Swing		

Malayan general election, 1955
Party	Candidate	Votes	%
Alliance	Hassan Yunos	19,802	84.53
NEGARA	Mohd Nor A Hamid	3,623	15.47
Total valid votes		23.425	100.00
Total rejected ballots			
Unreturned ballots			
Turnout		23,425	82.00
Registered electors		28,567	
Majority		6,438	69.06
This was a new constituency created.
Source(s): The Straits Times.
