= Pasir Mas Hilir =

Kelantan constituency

Defunct federal constituency
- Legislature: Dewan Rakyat
- Constituency created: 1958
- Constituency abolished: 1974
- First contested: 1959
- Last contested: 1969

Pasir Mas Hilir was a federal constituency in Kelantan, Malaysia, that was represented in the Dewan Rakyat from 1959 to 1974.

The federal constituency was created in the 1974 redistribution and was mandated to return a single member to the Dewan Rakyat under the first past the post voting system.

== History ==
It was abolished in 1974 when it was redistributed.

=== Representation history ===
Members of Parliament for Pasir Mas Hilir
Parliament	No	Years	Member	Party	Vote Share
Constituency created from Pasir Mas
Parliament of the Federation of Malaya
1st	P017	1959–1963	Nik Man Nik Mohamed (نئ من نئ محمد)	PMIP	12,422; 79.87%
Parliament of Malaysia
1st	P017	1963–1964	Nik Man Nik Mohamed (نئ من نئ محمد)	PMIP	12,422; 79.87%
2nd	P017	1964–1969	Muhammad Fakhruddin Abdullah (محمد فخرالدين عبدالله)	PMIP	13,476; 71.92%
		1969–1971	Parliament was suspended		
3rd	P017	1971–1973	Muhammad Fakhruddin Abdullah (محمد فخرالدين عبدالله)	PMIP	12,556; 63.12%
3rd	P017	1973–1974	Muhammad Fakhruddin Abdullah (محمد فخرالدين عبدالله)	BN (PMIP)	12,556; 63.12%
Constituency abolished, renamed to Pasir Mas

=== State constituency ===
Parliamentary constituency	State constituency						
Parliamentary constituency	1955–1959*	1959–1974	1974–1986	1986–1995	1995–2004	2004–2018	2018–present
Pasir Mas Hilir		Bandar Pasir Mas					
Pasir Mas Hilir		Meranti					
Pasir Mas Hilir		Tendong					

=== Historical boundaries ===
State Constituency	State constituency
State Constituency	1959
Bandar Pasir Mas	Banggol Chicha; Kubang Bemban; Kubang Gatal; Lubok Aching; Pasir Mas
Meranti	Kampung Bukit Perdah; Kampung Gelang Mas; Kampung Pangkal Kala; Kampung Siram; Meranti
Tendong	Bunut Susu; Kampung Hutan Cengal; Kampung Kayu Tinggi; Kampung Padang Embon; Tendong

== Election results ==
Malaysian general election, 1969: Pasir Mas Hilir
Party	Candidate	Votes	%	∆%
PMIP	Muhammad Fakhruddin Abdullah	12,556	63.12	▼8.80
Alliance	Che Hassan Che Ismail	7,336	36.88	▲8.80
Total valid votes		19,892	100.00	
Total rejected ballots		700		
Unreturned ballots		0		
Turnout		20,592	69.67	▼8.35
Registered electors		29,556		
Majority		5,220	26.24	▼17.60
PMIP hold		Swing		

Malaysian general election, 1964: Pasir Mas Hilir
Party	Candidate	Votes	%	∆%
PMIP	Muhammad Fakhruddin Abdullah	13,476	71.92	▼7.95
Alliance	Mokhtar Ahmad	5,261	28.08	▲7.95
Total valid votes		18,737	100.00	
Total rejected ballots		507		
Unreturned ballots		0		
Turnout		19,244	78.02	▼6.64
Registered electors		24,664		
Majority		8,215	43.84	▼15.90
PMIP hold		Swing		

Malayan general election, 1959: Pasir Mas Hilir
Party	Candidate	Votes	%
PMIP	Nik Man Nik Mohamed	12,422	79.87
Alliance	Che Omar Ali	3,130	20.13
Total valid votes		15,552	100.00
Total rejected ballots		74	
Unreturned ballots		0	
Turnout		15,626	71.38
Registered electors		21,891	
Majority		9,292	59.74
This was a new constituency created.
