= Krian Laut =

Constituency in Perak, Malaysia

Perak constituency

Defunct federal constituency
- Legislature: Dewan Rakyat
- Constituency created: 1958
- Constituency abolished: 1974
- First contested: 1959
- Last contested: 1969

Krian Laut was a federal constituency in Perak, Malaysia, that was represented in the Dewan Rakyat from 1959 to 1974.

The federal constituency was created in the 1974 redistribution and was mandated to return a single member to the Dewan Rakyat under the first past the post voting system.

== History ==
It was abolished in 1974 when it was redistributed.

=== Representation history ===
Members of Parliament for Krian Laut
| Parliament | No | Years | Member | Party | Vote Share |
Constituency created from Krian
Parliament of the Federation of Malaya
| 1st | P040 | 1959-1963 | Abdul Rauf Abdul Rahman (عبدالراوف عبدالرحمن) | Alliance (UMNO) | 8,074; 51.59% |
Parliament of Malaysia
| 1st | P040 | 1963-1964 | Abdul Rauf Abdul Rahman (عبدالراوف عبدالرحمن) | Alliance (UMNO) | 8,074; 51.59% |
| 2nd | P040 | 1964-1966 | Abdul Rauf Abdul Rahman (عبدالراوف عبدالرحمن) | Alliance (UMNO) | 10,109; 50.94% |
| 2nd | P040 | 1966-1969 | Sulaiman Taib (سليمان طائب) | Alliance (UMNO) | 11,206; 56.91% |
| | | 1969-1971 | Parliament was suspended | | |
| 3rd | P040 | 1971-1973 | Sulaiman Taib (سليمان طائب) | Alliance (UMNO) | 11,092; 50.69% |
| 3rd | P040 | 1973-1974 | Sulaiman Taib (سليمان طائب) | BN (UMNO) | 11,092; 50.69% |
Constituency abolished, renamed to Parit Buntar

=== State constituency ===
| Parliamentary constituency | State constituency | | | | | | |
| Parliamentary constituency | 1955–59* | 1959–1974 | 1974–1986 | 1986–1995 | 1995–2004 | 2004–2018 | 2018–present |
|---|---|---|---|---|---|---|---|
| Krian Laut | | Kuala Kurau | | | | | |
| Krian Laut | | Parit Buntar | | | | | |

=== Historical boundaries ===
| State Constituency | Area |
| State Constituency | 1959 |
|---|---|
| Kuala Kurau | Kuala Kurau; Parit Haji Wahab; Parit Tok Ngah; Tanjung Piandang; Teluk Pulai |
| Parit Buntar | Bagan Tiang; Parit Buntar; Simpang Lima; Sungai Kota; Titi Serong |

== Election results ==
Malaysian general election, 1969: Krian Laut
| Party | Candidate | Votes | % | ∆% |
|---|---|---|---|---|
| Alliance | Sulaiman Taib | 11,092 | 50.69 | ▼6.22 |
| PMIP | Mohamed Ja'afar Ibrahim | 10,792 | 49.31 | ▲6.22 |
| Total valid votes | | 21,884 | 100.00 | |
| Total rejected ballots | | 1,163 | | |
| Unreturned ballots | | 0 | | |
| Turnout | | 23,047 | 75.60 | |
| Registered electors | | 30,485 | | |
| Majority | | 300 | 1.38 | ▼12.44 |
| Alliance hold | | Swing | | |
Source(s) Election Commission of Malaysia.

Malaysian general by-election, 12 March 1966: Krian Laut Upon the death of incumbent, Abdul Rauf Abdul Rahman
| Party | Candidate | Votes | % | ∆% |
|---|---|---|---|---|
| Alliance | Sulaiman Taib | 11,206 | 56.91 | ▲5.97 |
| PMIP | Baharuddin Abdul Latiff | 8,484 | 43.09 | ▲5.54 |
| Total valid votes | | 19,690 | 100.00 | |
| Total rejected ballots | | | | |
| Unreturned ballots | | | | |
| Turnout | | | | |
| Registered electors | | 26,953 | | |
| Majority | | 2,722 | 13.82 | ▲0.43 |
| Alliance hold | | Swing | | |
Source(s) Berita Harian.

Malaysian general election, 1964: Krian Laut
| Party | Candidate | Votes | % | ∆% |
|---|---|---|---|---|
| Alliance | Abdul Rauf Abdul Rahman | 10,109 | 50.94 | ▼0.65 |
| PMIP | Abdul Wahab Mohd Noor | 7,452 | 37.55 | ▼10.86 |
| Socialist Front | Mohd Nordin Abdul Jalil | 2,282 | 11.50 | ▲11.50 |
| Total valid votes | | 19,843 | 100.00 | |
| Total rejected ballots | | 583 | | |
| Unreturned ballots | | 0 | | |
| Turnout | | 20,426 | 79.77 | ▲9.37 |
| Registered electors | | 25,605 | | |
| Majority | | 2,657 | 13.39 | ▲9.58 |
| Alliance hold | | Swing | | |

Malayan general election, 1959: Krian Laut
| Party | Candidate | Votes | % |
|---|---|---|---|
| Alliance | Abdul Rauf Abdul Rahman | 8,074 | 51.59 |
| PMIP | Ahmad Hussain | 7,577 | 48.41 |
| Total valid votes | | 15,651 | 100.00 |
| Total rejected ballots | | 126 | |
| Unreturned ballots | | 0 | |
| Turnout | | 15,777 | 70.40 |
| Registered electors | | 22,409 | |
| Majority | | 497 | 3.81 |
This was a new constituency created.
