= Segamat Utara =

Federal constituency in Johor, Malaysia

Johor constituency

Defunct federal constituency
- Legislature: Dewan Rakyat
- Constituency created: 1958
- Constituency abolished: 1974
- First contested: 1959
- Last contested: 1969

Segamat Utara was a federal constituency in Johor, Malaysia, that was represented in the Dewan Rakyat from 1959 to 1974.

The federal constituency was created in the 1974 redistribution and was mandated to return a single member to the Dewan Rakyat under the first past the post voting system.

== History ==
It was abolished in 1974 when it was redistributed.

=== Representation history ===
Members of Parliament for Segamat Utara
Parliament	No	Years	Member	Party	Vote Share
Constituency created from Segamat
Parliament of the Federation of Malaya
1st	P103	1959-1963	Abdullah Mohd Salleh (عبدالله محمد صالح)	Alliance (UMNO)	6,572; 2.84%
Parliament of Malaysia
1st	P103	1963-1964	Abdullah Mohd Salleh (عبدالله محمد صالح)	Alliance (UMNO)	6,572; 52.84%
2nd	P103	1964-1968	Abdullah Mohd Salleh (عبدالله محمد صالح)	Alliance (UMNO)	9,646; 57.21%
2nd	P103	1968-1969	Musa Hitam (موسى هيتم)	Alliance (UMNO)	9,485; 62.34%
		1969-1971	Parliament was suspended		
3rd	P103	1971-1973	Musa Hitam (موسى هيتم)	Alliance (UMNO)	10,012; 61.18%
3rd	P103	1973-1974	Musa Hitam (موسى هيتم)	BN (UMNO)	10,012; 61.18%
Constituency abolished, split into Labis and Segamat

=== State constituency ===
Parliamentary constituency	State constituency						
Parliamentary constituency	1954–59*	1959–1974	1974–1986	1986–1995	1995–2004	2004–2018	2018–present
Segamat Utara		Bandar Segamat					
Segamat Utara		Batu Anam					

=== Historical boundaries ===
State Constituency	Area
State Constituency	1959
Bandar Segamat	Gemereh; Jementah; Kampung Abdullah; Kampung Tasek; Segamat
Batu Anam	Batu Anam; Buloh Kasap; Gemas Baru; Kampung Sanglang; Jabi

== Election results ==
Malaysian general election, 1969: Segamat Utara
Party	Candidate	Votes	%	∆%
Alliance	Musa Hitam	10,212	61.18	▼1.16
DAP	Tan Thian San	6,480	38.82	▲1.16
Total valid votes		16,692	100.00	
Total rejected ballots		500		
Unreturned ballots		0		
Turnout		17,192	78.86	▲4.62
Registered electors		21,802		
Majority		3,732	22.36	▼2.27
Alliance hold		Swing		

Malaysian general by-election, 19 October 1968: Segamat Utara Upon the death of incumbent, Abdullah Mohd Salleh
Party	Candidate	Votes	%	∆%
Alliance	Musa Hitam	9,485	62.34	▲5.13
DAP	Lee Ah Meng	5,731	37.66	▲37.66
Total valid votes		15,216	100.00	
Total rejected ballots		211		
Unreturned ballots		0		
Turnout		15,427	74.24	▼11.64
Registered electors		20,779		
Majority		3,754	24.63	▼4.83
Alliance hold		Swing		

Malaysian general election, 1964: Segamat Utara
Party	Candidate	Votes	%	∆%
Alliance	Abdullah Mohd Salleh	9,646	57.21	▲4.37
Socialist Front	Pang Lee Seng	4,671	27.70	▲27.70
UDP	Lim Meng See	2,545	15.09	▲15.09
Total valid votes		16,862	100.00	
Total rejected ballots		549		
Unreturned ballots		0		
Turnout		17,411	85.88	▲2.48
Registered electors		20,273		
Majority		4,975	29.51	▲16.45
Alliance hold		Swing		

Malayan general election, 1959: Segamat Utara
Party	Candidate	Votes	%
Alliance	Abdullah Mohd Salleh	6,572	52.84
Independent	Lim Meng See	4,948	39.78
PMIP	Syed Mohamed Abdullah Al-Khard	917	7.37
Total valid votes		12,437	100.00
Total rejected ballots		109	
Unreturned ballots		0	
Turnout		12,546	83.40
Registered electors		15,044	
Majority		1,624	13.06
This was a new constituency created.
