= Seberang Selatan =

Penang constituency

Defunct federal constituency
- Legislature: Dewan Rakyat
- Constituency created: 1958
- Constituency abolished: 1974
- First contested: 1959
- Last contested: 1969

Seberang Selatan was a federal constituency in Penang, Malaysia, that was represented in the Dewan Rakyat from 1959 to 1974.

The federal constituency was created in the 1974 redistribution and was mandated to return a single member to the Dewan Rakyat under the first past the post voting system.

== History ==
It was abolished in 1974 when it was redistributed.

=== Representation history ===
Members of Parliament for Seberang Selatan
Parliament	No	Years	Member	Party	Vote Share
Constituency created from Wellesley South
Parliament of the Federation of Malaya
1st	P033	1959–1963	Veerappen Veerathan (வீராப்பன் வீரதன்)	SF (Lab)	5,077; 40.67%
Parliament of Malaysia
1st	P033	1963–1964	Veerappen Veerathan (வீராப்பன் வீரதன்)	SF (Lab)	5,077; 40.67%
2nd	P033	1964	Mohamed Noordin Mastan (محمد نوردين مستن)	Alliance (UMNO)	10,427; 60.60%
2nd	P033	1964–1969	Snawi Ismail (سناوي اسماعيل)	Alliance (UMNO)	9,298; 56.03%
		1969–1971	Parliament was suspended		
3rd	P033	1971–1972	Veerappen Veerathan (வீராப்பன் வீரதன்)	GERAKAN	9,738; 52.35%
3rd	P033	1972–1974	Veerappen Veerathan (வீராப்பன் வீரதன்)	PEKEMAS	9,738; 52.35%
Constituency abolished, renamed to Nibong Tebal

=== State constituency ===
Parliamentary constituency	State constituency						
Parliamentary constituency	1955–1959*	1959–1974	1974–1986	1986–1995	1995–2004	2004–2018	2018–present
Seberang Selatan		Nibong Tebal					
Seberang Selatan		Sungei Bakap					

=== Historical boundaries ===
State Constituency	Area
State Constituency	1959
Nibong Tebal	Bukit Panchor; Nibong Tebal; Sungai Acheh; Sungai Jawi; Transkrian
Sungei Bakap	Batu Kawan; Simpang Ampat; Sungai Bakap; Sungai Duri; Valdor

== Election results ==
Malaysian general election, 1969: Seberang Selatan
Party	Candidate	Votes	%	∆%
GERAKAN	Veerappen Veerathan	9,738	52.35	▲52.35
Alliance	Snawi Ismail	6,391	34.35	▼21.68
PMIP	Wahab Salleh	2,474	13.30	▲13.30
Total valid votes		18,603	100.00	
Total rejected ballots		684		
Unreturned ballots		0		
Turnout		19,287	78.49	
Registered electors		24,573		
Majority		3,347	18.00	▲5.94
GERAKAN gain from Alliance		Swing		?

Malaysian general by-election, 31 October 1964: Seberang Selatan Upon the death of incumbent, Mohamed Noordin Mastan
Party	Candidate	Votes	%	∆%
Alliance	Snawi Ismail	9,298	56.03	▼4.30
Socialist Front	Veerappen Veerathan	7,296	43.97	▲7.23
Total valid votes		16,594	100.00	
Total rejected ballots		197		
Unreturned ballots				
Turnout		16,791		
Registered electors				
Majority		2,002	12.06	▼11.80
Alliance hold		Swing		

Malaysian general election, 1964: Seberang Selatan
Party	Candidate	Votes	%	∆%
Alliance	Mohamed Noordin Mastan	10,427	60.60	▲26.05
Socialist Front	Veerappen Veerathan	6,322	36.74	▼3.93
PMIP	Mohamed Noor Mokhtar	457	2.66	▼22.12
Total valid votes		17,206	100.00	
Total rejected ballots		703		
Unreturned ballots		0		
Turnout		17,909	84.48	▲5.40
Registered electors		21,198		
Majority		4,105	23.86	▲17.74
Alliance gain from Socialist Front		Swing		?

Malayan general election, 1959: Seberang Selatan
Party	Candidate	Votes	%
Socialist Front	Veerappen Veerathan	5,077	40.67
Alliance	Tay Hooi Soo	4,313	34.55
PMIP	Md Jais Sudin	3,093	24.78
Total valid votes		12,483	100.00
Total rejected ballots		107	
Unreturned ballots		0	
Turnout		12,590	79.08
Registered electors		15,920	
Majority		764	6.12
This was a new constituency created.
