= Muar Pantai =

Johor constituency

Defunct federal constituency
- Legislature: Dewan Rakyat
- Constituency created: 1958
- Constituency abolished: 1974
- First contested: 1959
- Last contested: 1969

Muar Pantai was a federal constituency in Johor, Malaysia, that was represented in the Dewan Rakyat from 1959 to 1974.

The federal constituency was created in the 1974 redistribution and was mandated to return a single member to the Dewan Rakyat under the first past the post voting system.

== History ==
It was abolished in 1974 when it was redistributed.

=== Representation history ===
Members of Parliament for Muar Pantai
Parliament	No	Years	Member	Party	Vote Share
Constituency split from Muar Selatan
Parliament of the Federation of Malaya
1st	P091	1959-1963	Seah Teng Ngiab (余镇业)	Alliance (MCA)	8,997; 53.29%
Parliament of Malaysia
1st	P091	1963-1964	Seah Teng Ngiab (余镇业)	Alliance (MCA)	8,997; 53.29%
2nd	P091	1964-1969	Seah Teng Ngiab (余镇业)	Alliance (MCA)	16,578; 72.98%
		1969-1971	Parliament was suspended		
3rd	P091	1971-1973	Seah Teng Ngiab (余镇业)	Alliance (MCA)	13,755; 65.93%
3rd	P091	1973-1974	Seah Teng Ngiab (余镇业)	BN (MCA)	13,755; 65.93%
Constituency abolished, split into Muar and Pagoh

=== State constituency ===
Parliamentary constituency	State constituency						
Parliamentary constituency	1954–59*	1959–1974	1974–1986	1986–1995	1995–2004	2004–2018	2018–present
Muar Pantai		Bandar Maharani					
Muar Pantai		Parit Bakar					

=== Historical boundaries ===
State Constituency	Area
State Constituency	1959
Bandar Maharani	Kesang; Maharani; Parit Bunga; Sabak Awor; Tanjung Agas
Parit Bakar	Bentayan; Muar; Parit Bakar; Parit Punggur; Parit Unas

== Election results ==
Malaysian general election, 1969: Muar Pantai
Party	Candidate	Votes	%	∆%
Alliance	Seah Teng Ngiab	13,755	65.93	▼7.05
DAP	Khoo Chin Tow	7,108	34.07	▲34.07
Total valid votes		20,863	100.00	
Total rejected ballots		715		
Unreturned ballots		0		
Turnout		21,578	70.61	▼6.41
Registered electors		30,558		
Majority		6,647	31.86	▼14.10
Alliance hold		Swing		

Malaysian general election, 1964: Muar Pantai
Party	Candidate	Votes	%	∆%
Alliance	Seah Teng Ngiab	16,578	72.98	▲19.69
Socialist Front	Lee Boon Pin	6,137	27.02	▲15.21
Total valid votes		22,715	100.00	
Total rejected ballots		481		
Unreturned ballots		0		
Turnout		23,196	77.02	▲2.69
Registered electors		30,116		
Majority		10,441	45.96	▲14.77
Alliance hold		Swing		

Malayan general election, 1959: Muar Pantai
Party	Candidate	Votes	%
Alliance	Seah Teng Ngiab	8,997	53.29
National Party	Mohd Noor Hamid	3,731	22.10
PPP	Tan Kwee Wah	2,162	12.81
Socialist Front	Chua Ang Teck	1,994	11.81
Total valid votes		16,884	100.00
Total rejected ballots		126	
Unreturned ballots		0	
Turnout		17,010	74.33
Registered electors		22,884	
Majority		5,266	31.19
This was a new constituency created.
