= Perlis Selatan =

Perlis constituency

Defunct federal constituency
- Legislature: Dewan Rakyat
- Constituency created: 1958
- Constituency abolished: 1974
- First contested: 1959
- Last contested: 1969

Perlis Selatan was a federal constituency in Perlis, Malaysia, that was represented in the Dewan Rakyat from 1959 to 1974.

The federal constituency was created in the 1974 redistribution and was mandated to return a single member to the Dewan Rakyat under the first past the post voting system.

== History ==
It was abolished in 1974 when it was redistributed.

=== Representation history ===
Members of Parliament for Perlis Selatan
| Parliament | No | Years | Member | Party | Vote Share |
Constituency created from Perlis
Parliament of the Federation of Malaya
| 1st | P002 | 1959–1963 | Mokhtar Ismail (مختار اسماعيل) | Alliance (UMNO) | 8,015; 56.53% |
Parliament of Malaysia
| 1st | P002 | 1963–1964 | Mokhtar Ismail (مختار اسماعيل) | Alliance (UMNO) | 8,015; 56.53% |
| 2nd | P002 | 1964–1969 | Mokhtar Ismail (مختار اسماعيل) | Alliance (UMNO) | 10,486; 59.12% |
| | | 1969–1971 | Parliament was suspended | | |
| 3rd | P002 | 1971–1973 | Mokhtar Ismail (مختار اسماعيل) | Alliance (UMNO) | 11,432; 52.78% |
| 3rd | P002 | 1973–1974 | Mokhtar Ismail (مختار اسماعيل) | BN (UMNO) | 11,432; 52.78% |
Constituency abolished, split into Arau and Kangar

=== State constituency ===
| Parliamentary constituency | State constituency | | | | | | |
| Parliamentary constituency | 1955–1959* | 1959–1974 | 1974–1986 | 1986–1995 | 1995–2004 | 2004–2018 | 2018–present |
|---|---|---|---|---|---|---|---|
| Perlis Selatan | | Arau | | | | | |
| Perlis Selatan | | Kayang | | | | | |
| Perlis Selatan | | Kuala Perlis | | | | | |
| Perlis Selatan | | Kurong Anai | | | | | |
| Perlis Selatan | | Sanglang | | | | | |
| Perlis Selatan | | Utan Aji | | | | | |

=== Historical boundaries ===
| State Constituency | Area |
| State Constituency | 1959 |
|---|---|
| Arau | Arau; Kampung Hutan Kandis; Kampung Jelempok; Padang Nyu; Tambun Tulang |
| Kayang | Bukit Papan; Kampung Kenangan; Kampung Titi Serong; Kayang; Simpang Empat |
| Kuala Perlis | Kampung Kurong Tengar; Kampung Perak; Kuala Perlis; Sungai Berembang; Taman Semarak |
| Kurong Anai | Kampung Baru Kok Klang; Kampung Chermai; Kampung Paya Burma; Kurong Anai; Pauh |
| Sanglang | Bongor Kudong; Kampung Kepala Batas Pauh; Kuala Sanglang; Padang Keria; Sungai Padang |
| Utan Aji | Gunung Medan; Kampung Alor Redis; Kampung Guar Ujung Batu; Kampung Surau; Utan AJi |

== Election results ==
Malaysian general election, 1969: Perlis Selatan
| Party | Candidate | Votes | % | ∆% |
|---|---|---|---|---|
| Alliance | Mokhtar Ismail | 11,432 | 52.78 | ▲2.59 |
| PMIP | Abu Bakar Hamzah | 10,229 | 47.22 | ▼2.59 |
| Total valid votes | | 21,661 | 100.00 | |
| Total rejected ballots | | 610 | | |
| Unreturned ballots | | 0 | | |
| Turnout | | 22,271 | 79.18 | ▼1.21 |
| Registered electors | | 28,128 | | |
| Majority | | 1,203 | 5.56 | ▼12.68 |
| Alliance hold | | Swing | | |

Malaysian general election, 1964: Perlis Selatan
| Party | Candidate | Votes | % | ∆% |
|---|---|---|---|---|
| Alliance | Mokhtar Ismail | 10,486 | 59.12 | ▲2.59 |
| PMIP | Yusof Abdullah | 7,250 | 40.88 | ▼2.59 |
| Total valid votes | | 17,736 | 100.00 | |
| Total rejected ballots | | 843 | | |
| Unreturned ballots | | 0 | | |
| Turnout | | 18,579 | 80.39 | ▼4.44 |
| Registered electors | | 23,112 | | |
| Majority | | 3,236 | 18.24 | ▲5.08 |
| Alliance hold | | Swing | | |

Malayan general election, 1959: Perlis Selatan
| Party | Candidate | Votes | % |
|---|---|---|---|
| Alliance | Mokhtar Ismail | 8,015 | 56.53 |
| PMIP | Abdul Rahman Osman | 6,163 | 43.47 |
| Total valid votes | | 14,178 | 100.00 |
| Total rejected ballots | | 97 | |
| Unreturned ballots | | 0 | |
| Turnout | | 14,275 | 75.95 |
| Registered electors | | 18,795 | |
| Majority | | 1,852 | 13.06 |
This was a new constituency created.
