= Penang Utara =

Penang constituency

Defunct federal constituency
- Legislature: Dewan Rakyat
- Constituency created: 1958
- Constituency abolished: 1974
- First contested: 1959
- Last contested: 1969

Penang Utara was a federal constituency in Penang, Malaysia, that was represented in the Dewan Rakyat from 1959 to 1974.

The federal constituency was created in the 1974 redistribution and was mandated to return a single member to the Dewan Rakyat under the first past the post voting system.

== History ==
It was abolished in 1974 when it was redistributed.

=== Representation history ===
Members of Parliament for Penang Utara
Parliament	No	Years	Member	Party	Vote Share
Constituency created from Penang Island
Parliament of the Federation of Malaya
1st	P034	1959–1963	Geh Chong Keat (倪宗吉)	Alliance (MCA)	8,739; 50.04%
Parliament of Malaysia
1st	P034	1963–1964	Geh Chong Keat (倪宗吉)	Alliance (MCA)	8,739; 50.04%
2nd	P034	1964–1969	Geh Chong Keat (倪宗吉)	Alliance (MCA)	16,686; 52.17%
		1969–1971	Parliament was suspended		
3rd	P034	1971–1974	Peter Paul Dason (பீட்டர் பால் டேசன்)	DAP	20,930; 61.00%
Constituency abolished, split into Bukit Bendera, Jelutong and Balik Pulau

=== State constituency ===
Parliamentary constituency	State constituency						
Parliamentary constituency	1955–1959*	1959–1974	1974–1986	1986–1995	1995–2004	2004–2018	2018–present
Penang Utara		Ayer Itam					
Penang Utara		Doby Ghaut					
Penang Utara		Kelawai					
Penang Utara		Tanjong Bungah					

=== Historical boundaries ===
State Constituency	Area
State Constituency	1959
Ayer Itam	Ayer Itam; Bukit Bendera; Happy Valley; Hye Keat Estate; Farlim
Doby Ghaut	Jalan Caounter Hall; Jalan York; Kampung Baru; Kebun Bunga; Taman Free School
Kelawei	Ayer Rajah; Jalan Kelawei; Jalan Western; Kampung Sireh; Pulau Tikus
Tanjong Bungah	Kuala Sungai Pinang; Pantai Aceh; Tanjong Bungah; Tanjong Tokong; Teluk Bahang

== Election results ==
Malaysian general election, 1969: Penang Utara
Party	Candidate	Votes	%	∆%
DAP	Peter Paul Dason	20,930	61.00	▲61.00
Alliance	Geh Chong Keat	13,379	39.00	▲13.17
Total valid votes		34,309	100.00	
Total rejected ballots		1,730		
Unreturned ballots		0		
Turnout		36,039	76.54	▼6.90
Registered electors		47,083		
Majority		7,551	22.00	▲1.56
DAP gain from Alliance Party (Malaysia) Party (Malaysia)		Swing		?

Malaysian general election, 1964: Penang Utara
Party	Candidate	Votes	%	∆%
Alliance	Geh Chong Keat	16,686	52.17	▲2.13
Socialist Front	Lau Teik Hai	10,148	31.73	▼13.39
UDP	Toh Boon Kooi	5,149	16.10	▲16.10
Total valid votes		31,983	100.00	
Total rejected ballots		667		
Unreturned ballots		0		
Turnout		32,650	83.44	▲14.39
Registered electors		39,131		
Majority		6,538	20.44	▲15.52
Alliance hold		Swing		

Malayan general election, 1959: Penang Utara
Party	Candidate	Votes	%
Alliance	Geh Chong Keat	8,739	50.04
Socialist Front	Lau Teik Hai	7,880	45.12
Independent	Shaik Ahmad Shaik Mohamed	845	4.84
Total valid votes		17,464	100.00
Total rejected ballots		170	
Unreturned ballots		0	
Turnout		17,634	69.05
Registered electors		25,537	
Majority		859	4.92
This was a new constituency created.
