= Seberang Utara =

Penang constituency

Defunct federal constituency
- Legislature: Dewan Rakyat
- Constituency created: 1958
- Constituency abolished: 1974
- First contested: 1959
- Last contested: 1969

Seberang Utara was a federal constituency in Penang, Malaysia, that was represented in the Dewan Rakyat from 1959 to 1974.

The federal constituency was created in the 1974 redistribution and was mandated to return a single member to the Dewan Rakyat under the first past the post voting system.

== History ==
It was abolished in 1974 when it was redistributed.

=== Representation history ===
Members of Parliament for Seberang Utara
Parliament	No	Years	Member	Party	Vote Share
Constituency created from Wellesley North
Parliament of the Federation of Malaya
1st	P038	1959–1963	Ahmad Saaid (احمد ساعاد)	Alliance (UMNO)	12,748; 73.75%
Parliament of Malaysia
1st	P038	1963–1964	Ahmad Saaid (احمد ساعاد)	Alliance (UMNO)	12,748; 73.75%
2nd	P038	1964–1969	Ahmad Saaid (احمد ساعاد)	Alliance (UMNO)	15,440; 67.71%
		1969–1971	Parliament was suspended		
3rd	P038	1971–1973	Ahmad Saaid (احمد ساعاد)	Alliance (UMNO)	13,111; 54.98%
3rd	P038	1973–1974	Ahmad Saaid (احمد ساعاد)	BN (UMNO)	13,111; 54.98%
Constituency abolished, split into Kepala Batas, Mata Kuching and Permatang Pauh

=== State constituency ===
Parliamentary constituency	State constituency						
Parliamentary constituency	1955–1959*	1959–1974	1974–1986	1986–1995	1995–2004	2004–2018	2018–present
Seberang Utara		Muda					
Seberang Utara		Kepala Batas					
Seberang Utara		Tasek Glugor					

=== Historical boundaries ===
State Constituency	Area
State Constituency	1959
Muda	Bumbung Lima; Lahar Tiang; Penaga; Permatang Sintok; Pinang Tunggal
Kepala Batas	Ara Rendang; Permatang Buloh; Pokok Sena; Sungai Dua; Teluk Air Tawar
Tasek Glugor	Ara Kuda; Bertam; Kampung Selamat; Kubang Menerong; Padang Menora

== Election results ==
Malaysian general election, 1969: Seberang Utara
Party	Candidate	Votes	%	∆%
Alliance	Ahmad Saaid	13,111	54.98	▼12.73
PMIP	Musa Mohamed Yatim	10,737	45.02	▲27.10
Total valid votes		23,848	100.00	
Total rejected ballots		2,593		
Unreturned ballots		0		
Turnout		26,441	81.69	▼2.88
Registered electors		32,369		
Majority		2,374	9.96	▼39.83
Alliance hold		Swing		

Malaysian general election, 1964: Seberang Utara
Party	Candidate	Votes	%	∆%
Alliance	Ahmad Saaid	15,440	67.71	▼6.04
PMIP	Siti Fatimah @ Salmah Sheikh Hussain	4,087	17.92	▼8.33
Socialist Front	Omar Mohd. Yusoff	3,277	14.37	▲14.32
Total valid votes		22,804	100.00	
Total rejected ballots		1,010		
Unreturned ballots		0		
Turnout		23,814	84.57	▲8.26
Registered electors		28,160		
Majority		11,353	49.79	▼2.29
Alliance hold		Swing		

Malayan general election, 1959: Seberang Utara
Party	Candidate	Votes	%
Alliance	Ahmad Saaid	12,748	73.75
PMIP	Yusof Abdullah	4,537	26.25
Total valid votes		17,285	100.00
Total rejected ballots		249	
Unreturned ballots		0	
Turnout		17,534	76.31
Registered electors		22,978	
Majority		8,211	47.50
This was a new constituency created.
