= Krian Darat =

Perak constituency

Defunct federal constituency
- Legislature: Dewan Rakyat
- Constituency created: 1958
- Constituency abolished: 1974
- First contested: 1959
- Last contested: 1969

Krian Darat was a federal constituency in Perak, Malaysia, that was represented in the Dewan Rakyat from 1959 to 1974.

The federal constituency was created in the 1974 redistribution and was mandated to return a single member to the Dewan Rakyat under the first past the post voting system.

== History ==
It was abolished in 1974 when it was redistributed.

=== Representation history ===
Members of Parliament for Krian Darat
Parliament	No	Years	Member	Party	Vote Share
Constituency created from Krian
Parliament of the Federation of Malaya
1st	P041	1959-1963	Ahmad Yusof (احمد يوسف)	Alliance (UMNO)	7,954; 58.26%
Parliament of Malaysia
1st	P041	1963-1964	Ahmad Yusof (احمد يوسف)	Alliance (UMNO)	7,954; 58.26%
2nd	P041	1964-1969	Ramli Omar (راملي عمر)	Alliance (UMNO)	11,574; 63.93%
		1969-1971	Parliament was suspended		
3rd	P041	1971-1973	Ramli Omar (راملي عمر)	Alliance (UMNO)	12,479; 60.29%
3rd	P041	1973-1974	Ramli Omar (راملي عمر)	BN (UMNO)	12,479; 60.29%
Constituency abolished, renamed to Bagan Serai

=== State constituency ===
Parliamentary constituency	State constituency						
Parliamentary constituency	1955–59*	1959–1974	1974–1986	1986–1995	1995–2004	2004–2018	2018–present
Krian Darat		Bagan Serai					
Krian Darat		Gunong Semanggol					

=== Historical boundaries ===
State Constituency	Area
State Constituency	1959
Bagan Serai	Bagan Serai; Kampung Lian Seng; Kuala Gula; Sungai Gedong; Ladang Tali Ayer
Gunong Semanggol	Alor Pongsu; Bukit Merah; Gunong Semanggol; Selinsing; Simpang Empat

== Election results ==
Malaysian general election, 1969: Krian Darat
Party	Candidate	Votes	%	∆%
Alliance	Ramli Omar	12,479	60.29	▼3.64
PMIP	Mat Saman Mohamed	8,221	39.71	▲6.51
Total valid votes		20,700	100.00	
Total rejected ballots		1,211		
Unreturned ballots		0		
Turnout		21,911	74.26	▲3.96
Registered electors		29,507		
Majority		4,258	20.58	▲10.15
Alliance hold		Swing		

Malaysian general election, 1964: Krian Darat
Party	Candidate	Votes	%	∆%
Alliance	Ramli Omar	11,574	63.93	▲26.27
PMIP	Baharuddin Abdul Latif	6,011	33.20	▼8.54
UDP	Aris Yusof	518	2.86	▲2.86
Total valid votes		18,103	100.00	
Total rejected ballots		1,246		
Unreturned ballots		0		
Turnout		19,349	78.22	▲12.99
Registered electors		24,737		
Majority		5,563	30.73	▲14.21
Alliance hold		Swing		

Malayan general election, 1959: Krian Darat
Party	Candidate	Votes	%
Alliance	Ahmad Yusof	7,954	58.26
PMIP	Abdul Wahab Mohd Noor	5,698	41.74
Total valid votes		13,652	100.00
Total rejected ballots		209	
Unreturned ballots		0	
Turnout		13,861	65.23
Registered electors		21,248	
Majority		2,256	16.52
This was a new constituency created.
