= Mohamed Noah Foundation Mosque =

Mosque in Bentong, Pahang, Malaysia

- Masjid Yayasan Mohamed Noah
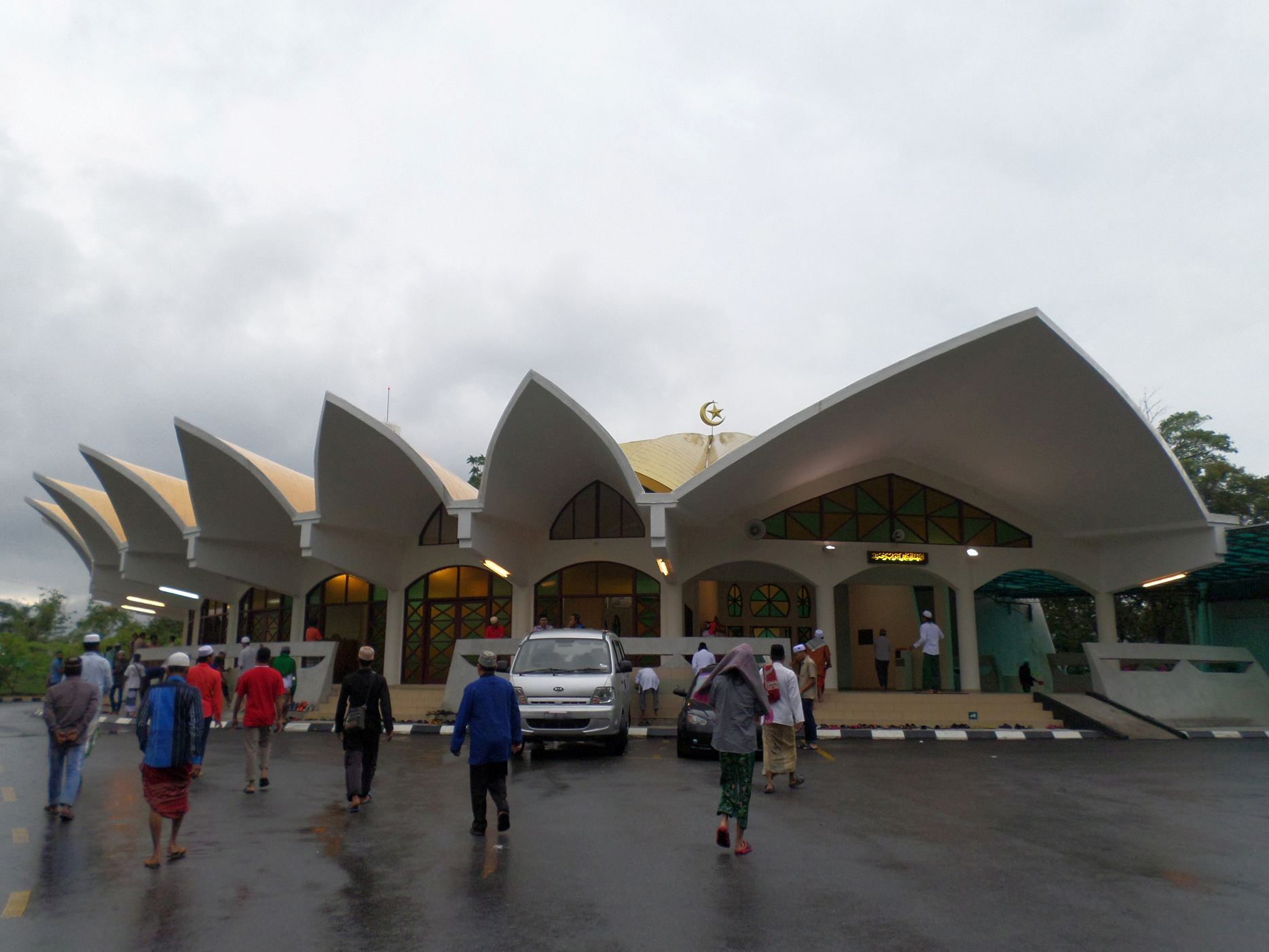

- Location within Pahang

Religion
- Affiliation: Islam
- Branch/tradition: Sunni

Location
- Location: Genting Highlands, Pahang, Malaysia
- Interactive map of Mohamed Noah Foundation Mosque
- Coordinates: 3.402164°N 101.7801864°E

Architecture
- Type: mosque
- Minaret: 1

The Mohamed Noah Foundation Mosque (Malay: Masjid Yayasan Mohamed Noah) is the only mosque in Genting Highlands, Pahang, Malaysia. It was opened in 1981. This mosque also acts as the rest area for Muslims to perform their prayers during, before or after vacation to Genting Highlands. It was named after Tan Sri Mohammad Noah, a Malaysian politician and he was among the founders of Genting Highlands after Tan Sri Lim Goh Tong.

== See also ==
- Islam in Malaysia
