= Kuala Trengganu Utara =

Terengganu constituency

Defunct federal constituency
- Legislature: Dewan Rakyat
- Constituency created: 1958
- Constituency abolished: 1974
- First contested: 1959
- Last contested: 1969

Kuala Trengganu Utara was a federal constituency in Terengganu, Malaysia, that was represented in the Dewan Rakyat from 1959 to 1974.

The federal constituency was created in the 1974 redistribution and was mandated to return a single member to the Dewan Rakyat under the first past the post voting system.

== History ==
It was abolished in 1974 when it was redistributed.

=== Representation history ===
Members of Parliament for Kuala Trengganu Utara
Parliament	No	Years	Member	Party	Vote Share
Constituency created from Trengganu Utara
Parliament of the Federation of Malaya
1st	P026	1959–1963	Hasan Adli Mohd Arshad (حسن عدلي محمد ارشد)	PMIP	7,262; 50.65%
Parliament of Malaysia
1st	P026	1963–1964	Hasan Adli Mohd Arshad (حسن عدلي محمد ارشد)	PMIP	7,262; 50.65%
2nd	P026	1964–1969	Wan Abdul Kadir Ismail (وان عبدالقادر اسماعيل)	Alliance (UMNO)	11,500; 62.67%
		1969–1971	Parliament was suspended		
3rd	P026	1971–1973	Wan Abdul Kadir Ismail (وان عبدالقادر اسماعيل)	Alliance (UMNO)	11,438; 53.08%
3rd	P026	1973–1974	Wan Abdul Kadir Ismail (وان عبدالقادر اسماعيل)	BN (UMNO)	11,438; 53.08%
Constituency abolished, split into Ulu Nerus and Kuala Nerus

=== State constituency ===
Parliamentary constituency	State constituency						
Parliamentary constituency	1954–1959*	1959–1974	1974–1986	1986–1995	1995–2004	2004–2018	2018–present
Kuala Trengganu Utara		Batu Rakit					
Kuala Trengganu Utara		Jeram					
Kuala Trengganu Utara		Kuala Nerus					
Kuala Trengganu Utara		Langkap					

=== Historical boundaries ===
State Constituency	Area
State Constituency	1959
Batu Rakit	Batu Rakit; Gong Badak; Merang; Pulau Bidong; Pulau Redang
Jeram	Bukit Tunggal; Jeram; Kampung Petaling; Kampung Sungai Ikan; Manir
Kuala Nerus	Kampung Batu Enam; Kampung Tanjung Angsa; Kuala Nerus; Seberang Takir; Wakaf Tembesu
Langkap	FELDA Belara; Kampung Payung; Kampung Pulau Manis; Kampung Sungai Bari; Langkap

== Election results ==
Malaysian general election, 1969: Kuala Trengganu Utara
Party	Candidate	Votes	%	∆%
Alliance	Wan Abdul Kadir Ismail	11,438	53.08	▼9.59
PMIP	Syed Shafie Tuan Baharu	10,112	46.92	▲15.14
Total valid votes		21,550	100.00	
Total rejected ballots		1,957		
Unreturned ballots		0		
Turnout		23,507	77.87	▲0.19
Registered electors		30,187		
Majority		1,326	6.16	▼24.74
Alliance hold		Swing		

Malaysian general election, 1964: Kuala Trengganu Utara
Party	Candidate	Votes	%	∆%
Alliance	Wan Abdul Kadir Ismail	11,500	62.67	▲17.09
PMIP	Salahuddin Abdullah	5,829	31.77	▼18.88
National Party	Che Embong Abdullah	1,020	5.56	▲5.56
Total valid votes		18,349	100.00	
Total rejected ballots		869		
Unreturned ballots		0		
Turnout		19,218	77.68	▲4.60
Registered electors		24,739		
Majority		5,671	30.90	▲25.83
Alliance gain from National Trust Party (Malaysia)-Malayan Islamic Party		Swing		?

Malayan general election, 1959: Kuala Trengganu Utara
Party	Candidate	Votes	%
PMIP	Hasan Adli Mohd Arshad	7,262	50.65
Alliance	Wan Abdul Kadir Ismail	6,535	45.58
Independent	Ibrahim Abdul Kadir	540	3.77
Total valid votes		14,337	100.00
Total rejected ballots		274	
Unreturned ballots		0	
Turnout		14,611	73.08
Registered electors		19,994	
Majority		727	5.07
This was a new constituency created.
