= Pasir Mas Hulu =

Kelantan constituency

Defunct federal constituency
- Legislature: Dewan Rakyat
- Constituency created: 1958
- Constituency abolished: 1974
- First contested: 1959
- Last contested: 1969

Pasir Mas Hulu was a federal constituency in Kelantan, Malaysia, that was represented in the Dewan Rakyat from year 1959 to 1974.

The federal constituency was created in year 1974 redistribution and was mandated to return a single member to the Dewan Rakyat under the first past the post voting system.

== History ==
It was abolished in 1974 when it was redistributed.

=== Representation history ===
Members of Parliament for Pasir Mas Hulu
Parliament	No	Years	Member	Party	Vote Share
Constituency created from Pasir Mas
Parliament of the Federation of Malaya
1st	P021	1959–1963	Mohamed Hanifah Abdul Ghani (محمد حنيفه عبدالغني)	PMIP	9,518; 72.78%
Parliament of Malaysia
1st	P021	1963–1964	Mohamed Hanifah Abdul Ghani (محمد حنيفه عبدالغني)	PMIP	9,518; 72.78%
2nd	P021	1964–1967	Abdul Samad Gul Ahmad Mianji (عبدالصمد ڬول احمد مينجي)	PMIP	9,857; 64.20%
2nd	P021	1967–1969	Tengku Zaid Tengku Ahmad (تڠكو زيد تڠكو احمد)	PMIP	9,733; 58.41%
		1969–1971	Parliament was suspended		
3rd	P021	1971–1973	Tengku Zaid Tengku Ahmad (تڠكو زيد تڠكو احمد)	PMIP	9,208; 54.25%
3rd	P021	1973–1974	Tengku Zaid Tengku Ahmad (تڠكو زيد تڠكو احمد)	BN (PMIP)	9,208; 54.25%
Constituency abolished, renamed to Rantau Panjang

=== State constituency ===
Parliamentary constituency	State constituency						
Parliamentary constituency	1955–1959*	1959–1974	1974–1986	1986–1995	1995–2004	2004–2018	2018–present
Pasir Mas Hulu		Lemal					
Pasir Mas Hulu		Rantau Panjang					
Pasir Mas Hulu		Tok Uban					

=== Historical boundaries ===
State Constituency	Area
State Constituency	1959
Lemal	Chicha Tinggi; Gual Kulim; Lemal; Lubok Jong; Repek
Rantau Panjang	Gual Periok; Kampung Banggol Mek Pit; Lubok Stol; Rantau Panjang; Telaga Mas
Tok Uban	Bukit Tuku; Chenok; Chetok; Kampung Kubang Batu; Tok Uban

== Election results ==
Malaysian general election, 1969: Pasir Mas Hulu
Party	Candidate	Votes	%	∆%
PMIP	Tengku Zaid Tengku Ahmad	9,208	54.25	▼4.16
Alliance	Dusuki Ahmad	7,766	45.75	▲4.16
Total valid votes		16,974	100.00	
Total rejected ballots		507		
Unreturned ballots		0		
Turnout		17,481	68.83	▼2.79
Registered electors		25,397		
Majority		1,442	8.50	▼8.32
PMIP hold		Swing		

Malaysian general by-election, 19 August 1967: Pasir Mas Hulu Upon the death of incumbent, Abdul Samad Gul Ahmad Mianji
Party	Candidate	Votes	%	∆%
PMIP	Tengku Zaid Tengku Ahmad	9,733	58.41	▼5.79
Alliance	Hussein Ahmad	6,931	41.59	▲5.79
Total valid votes		16,664	100.00	
Total rejected ballots		252		
Unreturned ballots		0		
Turnout		16,916	71.62	▼5.60
Registered electors		23,618		
Majority		2,802	16.82	▼11.58
PMIP hold		Swing		

Malaysian general election, 1964: Pasir Mas Hulu
Party	Candidate	Votes	%	∆%
PMIP	Abdul Samad Gul Ahmad Mianji	9,857	64.20	▼8.58
Alliance	Hussein Ahmad	5,496	35.80	▲8.58
Total valid votes		15,353	100.00	
Total rejected ballots		680		
Unreturned ballots		0		
Turnout		16,033	77.22	▲5.19
Registered electors		20,764		
Majority		4,361	28.40	▼17.16
PMIP hold		Swing		

Malayan general election, 1959: Pasir Mas Hulu
Party	Candidate	Votes	%
PMIP	Mohamed Hanifah Abdul Ghani	9,518	72.78
Alliance	Ya'acob Awang	3,559	27.22
Total valid votes		13,077	100.00
Total rejected ballots		150	
Unreturned ballots		0	
Turnout		13,227	72.03
Registered electors		18,364	
Majority		5,959	45.56
This was a new constituency created.
