= Ulu Perak (federal constituency) =

Perak constituency

Defunct federal constituency
- Legislature: Dewan Rakyat
- Constituency created: 1958
- Constituency abolished: 1974
- First contested: 1959
- Last contested: 1969

Ulu Perak was a federal constituency in Perak, Malaysia, that was represented in the Dewan Rakyat from 1959 to 1974.

The federal constituency was created in the 1974 redistribution and was mandated to return a single member to the Dewan Rakyat under the first past the post voting system.

== History ==
It was abolished in 1974 when it was redistributed.

=== Representation history ===
Members of Parliament for Ulu Perak
Parliament	No	Years	Member	Party	Vote Share
Constituency created from Sungei Perak Ulu
Parliament of the Federation of Malaya
1st	P039	1959-1963	Mohamed Nor Mohd Dahan (محمد نور محمد داهن)	Alliance (UMNO)	7,869; 54.93%
Parliament of Malaysia
1st	P039	1963-1964	Mohamed Nor Mohd Dahan (محمد نور محمد داهن)	Alliance (UMNO)	7,869; 54.93%
2nd	P039	1964-1969	Mohamed Ghazali Jawi (محمد غزالي جاوي)	Alliance (UMNO)	12,846; 68.49%
		1969-1971	Parliament was suspended		
3rd	P039	1971-1973	Mohamed Nor Mohd Dahan (محمد نور محمد داهن)	Alliance (UMNO)	13,013; 65.63%
3rd	P039	1973-1974	Mohamed Nor Mohd Dahan (محمد نور محمد داهن)	BN (UMNO)	13,013; 65.63%
Constituency abolished, split into Gerik and Padang Rengas

=== State constituency ===
Parliamentary constituency	State constituency						
Parliamentary constituency	1955–59*	1959–1974	1974–1986	1986–1995	1995–2004	2004–2018	2018–present
Ulu Perak		Grik					
Ulu Perak		Lenggong					

=== Historical boundaries ===
State Constituency	Area
State Constituency	1959
Grik	Gerik; Kenering; Lawin; Pengkalan Hulu; Temenggor
Lenggong	Belum; Kuak; Lenggong; Pos Piol; Sauk

== Election results ==
Malaysian general election, 1969
Party	Candidate	Votes	%	∆%
Alliance	Mohamed Nor Mohd Dahan	13,013	65.63	▼2.86
PMIP	Abdul Wahab Mohd Noor	5,124	25.84	▲9.77
Independent	Din Jusoh	1,691	8.53	▲8.53
Total valid votes		19,828	100.00	
Total rejected ballots		1,044		
Unreturned ballots		0		
Turnout		20,872	78.22	▼6.04
Registered electors		26,684		
Majority		7,889	39.79	▼12.63
Alliance hold		Swing		

Malaysian general election, 1964
Party	Candidate	Votes	%	∆%
Alliance	Mohamed Ghazali Jawi	12,846	68.49	▲13.56
PMIP	Aduan Alang Abdul Mutalib	3,015	16.07	▲2.62
UDP	Tan Kim Seng	2,896	15.44	▲15.44
Total valid votes		18,757	100.00	
Total rejected ballots		768		
Unreturned ballots		0		
Turnout		19,525	84.26	▲16.56
Registered electors		23,172		
Majority		9,831	52.42	▲23.88
Alliance hold		Swing		

Malayan general election, 1959
Party	Candidate	Votes	%
Alliance	Mohamed Nor Mohd Dahan	7,869	54.93
Independent	Tan Kim Seng	3,780	26.39
PMIP	Abdul Samad Md Noh	2,677	18.69
Total valid votes		14,326	100.00
Total rejected ballots		183	
Unreturned ballots		0	
Turnout		14,509	67.70
Registered electors		21,430	
Majority		4,089	28.54
This was a new constituency created.
