= Kota Bharu Hulu =

Kelantan constituency

Defunct federal constituency
- Legislature: Dewan Rakyat
- Constituency created: 1958
- Constituency abolished: 1974
- First contested: 1959
- Last contested: 1969

Kota Bharu Hulu was a federal constituency in Kelantan, Malaysia, that was represented in the Dewan Rakyat from 1959 to 1974.

The federal constituency was created in the 1974 redistribution and was mandated to return a single member to the Dewan Rakyat under the first past the post voting system.

== History ==
It was abolished in 1974 when it was redistributed.

=== Representation history ===
Members of Parliament for Kota Bharu Hulu
Parliament	Years	Member	Party	Vote Share
Constituency created from Kelantan Tengah
Parliament of the Federation of Malaya
1st	1959–1963	Hussin Rahimi Saman (حسين رحيمي سامن)	PMIP	14,775; 79.76%
Parliament of Malaysia
1st	1963–1964	Hussin Rahimi Saman (حسين رحيمي سامن)	PMIP	14,775; 79.76%
2nd	1964–1969	Hussin Rahimi Saman (حسين رحيمي سامن)	PMIP	15,656; 66.42%
	1969–1971	Parliament was suspended		
3rd	1971–1973	Mohamad Asri Muda (محمد عصري مودا)	PMIP	15,051; 59.47%
3rd	1973–1974	Mohamad Asri Muda (محمد عصري مودا)	BN (PMIP)	15,051; 59.47%
Constituency abolished, split into Nilam Puri, Pengkalan Chepa and Kota Baharu

=== State constituency ===
Parliamentary constituency	State constituency						
Parliamentary constituency	1955–1959*	1959–1974	1974–1986	1986–1995	1995–2004	2004–2018	2018–present
Kota Bharu Hulu		Kota Bharu Barat					
Kota Bharu Hulu		Kota Bharu Selatan					
Kota Bharu Hulu		Kota Bharu Timor					

=== Historical boundaries ===
State Constituency	Area
State Constituency	1959
Kota Bharu Barat	Dewan Beta; Kedai Mulong; Kubang Macang; Seribong; Tunjung
Kota Bharu Selatan	Kampung Perol; Kadok; Ketereh; Kok Lanas; Pangkal Kalong
Kota Bharu Timor	Jejulok; Melor; Pangkal Pisang; Peringat; Pauh Lima

== Election results ==
Malaysian general election, 1969: Kota Bharu Hulu
Party	Candidate	Votes	%	∆%
PMIP	Mohamad Asri Muda	15,051	59.47	▼6.95
Alliance	Ali Husin	10,021	39.60	▲6.02
Independent	Che Khadijah Mohd Sidik	235	0.93	▲0.93
Total valid votes		25,307	100.00	
Total rejected ballots		884		
Unreturned ballots		0		
Turnout		26,191	75.49	▼6.36
Registered electors		34,693		
Majority		5,030	19.87	▼12.97
PMIP hold		Swing		

Malaysian general election, 1964: Kota Bharu Hulu
Party	Candidate	Votes	%	∆%
PMIP	Hussin Rahimi Saman	15,656	66.42	▼13.34
Alliance	Ibrahim Mat	7,915	33.58	▲13.34
Total valid votes		23,571	100.00	
Total rejected ballots		965		
Unreturned ballots		0		
Turnout		24,536	81.85	▼12.29
Registered electors		29,978		
Majority		7,741	32.84	▼26.68
PMIP hold		Swing		

Malayan general election, 1959: Kota Bharu Hulu
Party	Candidate	Votes	%
PMIP	Hussin Rahimi Saman	14,775	79.76
Alliance	Ismail Ibrahim	3,749	20.24
Total valid votes		18,524	100.00
Total rejected ballots		358	
Unreturned ballots		0	
Turnout		18,882	68.86
Registered electors		27,421	
Majority		11,026	59.52
This was a new constituency created.
