= Jitra-Padang Terap =

Kedah constituency

Defunct federal constituency
- Legislature: Dewan Rakyat
- Constituency created: 1958
- Constituency abolished: 1974
- First contested: 1959
- Last contested: 1969

Jitra-Padang Terap was a federal constituency in Kedah, Malaysia, that was represented in the Dewan Rakyat from 1959 to 1974.

The federal constituency was created in the 1974 redistribution and was mandated to return a single member to the Dewan Rakyat under the first past the post voting system.

== History ==
It was abolished in 1974 when it was redistributed.

=== Representation history ===
Members of Parliament for Jitra-Padang Terap
Parliament	No	Years	Member	Party	Vote Share
Constituency created from Kedah Utara
Parliament of the Federation of Malaya
1st	P003	1959–1963	Fatimah Hashim (فاطمة هاشم)	Alliance (UMNO)	10,981; 65.22%
Parliament of Malaysia
1st	P003	1963–1964	Fatimah Hashim (فاطمة هاشم)	Alliance (UMNO)	10,981; 65.22%
2nd	P003	1964–1969	Fatimah Hashim (فاطمة هاشم)	Alliance (UMNO)	15,835; 72.17%
		1969–1971	Parliament was suspended		
3rd	P003	1971–1973	Fatimah Hashim (فاطمة هاشم)	Alliance (UMNO)	15,145; 56.64%
3rd	P003	1973–1974	Fatimah Hashim (فاطمة هاشم)	BN (UMNO)	15,145; 56.64%
Constituency abolished, split into Kubang Pasu and Padang Terap

=== State constituency ===
Parliamentary constituency	State constituency						
Parliamentary constituency	1955–1959*	1959–1974	1974–1986	1986–1995	1995–2004	2004–2018	2018–present
Jitra-Padang Terap		Jitra					
Jitra-Padang Terap		Padang Terap					

=== Historical boundaries ===
State Constituency	Area
State Constituency	1959
Jitra	Bukit Kayu Hitam; Changlun; Jitra; Kodiang; Sintok
Padang Terap	Lubuk Kawah; Kampung Teluk Manek; Kuala Nerang; Naka; Padang Sanai

== Election results ==
Malaysian general election, 1969: Jitra-Padang Terap
Party	Candidate	Votes	%	∆%
Alliance	Fatimah Hashim	15,145	56.64	▼15.53
PMIP	Siti Fatimah @ Salmah Sheikh Hussain	11,595	43.36	▲15.53
Total valid votes		26,740	100.00	
Total rejected ballots		1,186		
Unreturned ballots		0		
Turnout		27,927	78.23	▲0.09
Registered electors		35,697		
Majority		3,550	13.28	▼31.06
Alliance hold		Swing		

Malaysian general election, 1964: Jitra-Padang Terap
Party	Candidate	Votes	%	∆%
Alliance	Fatimah Hashim	15,835	72.17	▲6.95
PMIP	Isa Mohamad	6,105	27.83	▼6.95
Total valid votes		21,940	100.00	
Total rejected ballots		1,077		
Unreturned ballots		0		
Turnout		23,017	78.12	▲2.60
Registered electors		29,464		
Majority		9,730	44.34	▲13.90
Alliance hold		Swing		

Malayan general election, 1959: Jitra-Padang Terap
Party	Candidate	Votes	%
Alliance	Fatimah Hashim	10,981	65.22
PMIP	Husin Salleh	5,856	34.78
Total valid votes		16,837	100.00
Total rejected ballots		212	
Unreturned ballots		0	
Turnout		17,049	75.52
Registered electors		22,576	
Majority		5,125	30.44
This was a new constituency created.
