= Semerah (federal constituency) =

Johor constituency

Defunct federal constituency
- Legislature: Dewan Rakyat
- Constituency created: 1974
- Constituency abolished: 1986
- First contested: 1974
- Last contested: 1982

Semerah was a federal constituency in Johor, Malaysia, that was represented in the Dewan Rakyat from 1974 to 1986.

The federal constituency was created in the 1974 redistribution and was mandated to return a single member to the Dewan Rakyat under the first past the post voting system.

== History ==
It was abolished in 1986 when it was redistributed.

=== Representation history ===
Members of Parliament for Semerah
Parliament	No	Years	Member	Party	Vote Share
Constituency created from Muar Selatan and Batu Pahat
4th	P110	1974-1978	Fatimah Abdul Majid (فاطمه عبدالمجيد)	BN (UMNO)	16,030; 78.56%
5th	P110	1978-1982	Shariffah Dorah Syed Mohammed (شريفه دورح سيد محمد)	BN (UMNO)	22,264; 86.07%
6th	P110	1982-1986	Shariffah Dorah Syed Mohammed (شريفه دورح سيد محمد)	BN (UMNO)	25,596; 86.39%
Constituency abolished, split into Parit Sulong, Muar, Bakri and Sri Gading

=== State constituency ===
Parliamentary constituency	State constituency						
Parliamentary constituency	1954–59*	1959–1974	1974–1986	1986–1995	1995–2004	2004–2018	2018–present
Semerah			Peserai				
Semerah			Sri Menanti				

=== Historical boundaries ===
State Constiteuncy	Area
State Constiteuncy	1974
Peserai	Bagan; Parit Ju; Parit Kassim; Parit Raja Ahmad; Peserai
Sri Menanti	Parit Kuda; Parit Sangit; Semerah; Sri Menanti; Sungai Balang

== Election results ==
Malaysian general election, 1982
Party	Candidate	Votes	%	∆%
BN	Shariffah Dorah Syed Mohammed	25,596	86.39	▲0.32
PAS	Abdullah Rahmat	4,034	13.61	▼0.32
Total valid votes		29,630	100.00	
Total rejected ballots		1,082		
Unreturned ballots		0		
Turnout		30,712	73.61	▼2.87
Registered electors		41,721		
Majority		21,562	72.78	▲0.64
BN hold		Swing		

Malaysian general election, 1978
Party	Candidate	Votes	%	∆%
BN	Shariffah Dorah Syed Mohammed	22,264	86.07	▲7.51
PAS	Mohamed Kassim	3,602	13.93	▲13.93
Total valid votes		25,866	100.00	
Total rejected ballots		1,319		
Unreturned ballots		0		
Turnout		27,185	76.48	▲5.98
Registered electors		35,546		
Majority		18,662	72.14	▲15.02
BN hold		Swing		

Malaysian general election, 1974
Party	Candidate	Votes	%
BN	Fatimah Abdul Majid	16,030	78.56
Independent	Abdul Hadi Mohamed Yassin	4,374	21.44
Total valid votes		20,404	100.00
Total rejected ballots		636	
Unreturned ballots		0	
Turnout		21,040	70.50
Registered electors		29,846	
Majority		11,656	57.12
This was a new constituency created.
