= Kulim Utara =

Kedah constituency

Defunct federal constituency
- Legislature: Dewan Rakyat
- Constituency created: 1958
- Constituency abolished: 1974
- First contested: 1959
- Last contested: 1969

Kulim Utara was a federal constituency in Kedah, Malaysia, that was represented in the Dewan Rakyat from 1959 to 1974.

The federal constituency was created in the 1974 redistribution and was mandated to return a single member to the Dewan Rakyat under the first past the post voting system.

== History ==
It was abolished in 1974 when it was redistributed.

=== Representation history ===
Members of Parliament for Kulim Utara
Parliament	No	Years	Member	Party	Vote Share
Constituency created from Kedah Selatan
Parliament of the Federation of Malaya
1st	P013	1959–1963	Hanafi Mohd Yunus (حنفي محمد يونس)	Alliance (UMNO)	12,281 82.90%
Parliament of Malaysia					
1st	P013	1963–1964	Hanafi Mohd Yunus (حنفي محمد يونس)	Alliance (UMNO)	12,281 82.90%
2nd	P013	1964–1969	Hanafi Mohd Yunus (حنفي محمد يونس)	Alliance (UMNO)	12,839 76.66%
		1969–1971	Parliament was suspended		
3rd	P013	1971–1973	Bibi Aishah Hamid Don (بيبي عايشه حميد دون)	Alliance (UMNO)	12,131 67.68%
3rd	P013	1973–1974	Bibi Aishah Hamid Don (بيبي عايشه حميد دون)	BN (UMNO)	12,131 67.68%
Constituency abolished, renamed to Padang Serai

=== State constituency ===
Parliamentary constituency	State constituency						
Parliamentary constituency	1955–1959*	1959–1974	1974–1986	1986–1995	1995–2004	2004–2018	2018–present
Kulim Utara		Lunas					
Kulim Utara		Sidam					

=== Historical boundaries ===
State Constituency	Area
State Constituency	1959
Lunas	FELCRA Bukit Hijau; Keladi; Labu Besar; Lunas; Sungai Ular
Sidam	Naga Lilit; Padang Serai; Pinang Tunggal; Sungai Karangan; Tanjung Belit

== Election results ==
Malaysian general election, 1969: Kulim Utara
Party	Candidate	Votes	%	∆%
Alliance	Bibi Aishah Hamid Don	12,131	67.68	▼8.98
PMIP	Md. Zahari Shaari	5,792	32.32	▲8.98
Total valid votes		17,923	100.00	
Total rejected ballots		1,096		
Unreturned ballots		0		
Turnout		19,019	73.61	▼1.97
Registered electors		25,839		
Majority		6,339	35.36	▼17.96
Alliance hold		Swing		

Malaysian general election, 1964: Kulim Utara
Party	Candidate	Votes	%	∆%
Alliance	Hanafi Mohd Yunus	12,839	76.66	▼6.24
PMIP	Khatib Shorbaini Hassan	3,910	23.34	▲6.24
Total valid votes		16,749	100.00	
Total rejected ballots		1,484		
Unreturned ballots		0		
Turnout		18,233	75.58	▼1.16
Registered electors		24,125		
Majority		8,929	53.32	▼12.48
Alliance hold		Swing		

Malayan general election, 1959: Kulim Utara
Party	Candidate	Votes	%
Alliance	Hanafi Mohd Yunus	12,281	82.90
PMIP	Khatib Shorbaini Hassan	2,533	17.10
Total valid votes		14,814	100.00
Total rejected ballots		310	
Unreturned ballots		0	
Turnout		15,124	76.74
Registered electors		19,708	
Majority		9,748	65.80
This was a new constituency created.
