= Members of the Dewan Rakyat, 2nd Malaysian Parliament =

Malaysian federal legislators serving 1964-69

2nd Parliament of Malaysia
←	1st Parliament	3rd Parliament	→

Overview
- Legislative body: Parliament of Malaysia
- Jurisdiction: Malaysia
- Meeting place: Malaysian Houses of Parliament
- Term: 18 May 1964 – 20 March 1969
- Election: 1964 general election
- Government: Third Rahman cabinet
- Website: www.parlimen.gov.my

Dewan Rakyat
- Members: 159
- Speaker: Syed Esa Alwee (until 24 November 1964); Chik Mohamed Yusuf Sheikh Abdul Rahman
- Deputy Speaker: Syed Esa Alwee
- Secretary: Sheikh Abdullah Sheikh Abu Bakar (until 1965); Shamsuddin Mohd Sidin (until 1967); Jaafar Mohd Taha (until 1969); Ahmad Abdullah
- Prime Minister: Tunku Abdul Rahman
- Leader of the Opposition: Tan Chee Khoon
- Party control: Alliance

Sovereign
- Yang di-Pertuan Agong: Tuanku Syed Putra (until 20 September 1965); Tuanku Ismail Nasiruddin Shah

Sessions
- 1st: 18 May 1964 – 5 March 1965
- 2nd: 25 May 1965 – 25 March 1966
- 3rd: 14 June 1966 – 7 March 1967
- 4th: 13 June 1967 – 1 March 1968
- 5th: 5 June 1968 – 14 February 1969

This is a list of the members of the Dewan Rakyat (House of Representatives) of the 2nd Parliament of Malaysia, elected in 1964.

== Composition ==
State	# of Seats	UMNO Seats	MCA Seats	MIC Seats	PMIP Seats	PPP Seats	PAP Seats	Lab Seats	Ra'ayat Seats	Negara Seats	UDP Seats	IND Seats
Perlis	2	2										
Kedah	12	10	2									
Kelantan	10	2			8							
Trengganu	6	5			1							
Penang	8	4	2					1			1	
Perak	20	9	8	1		2						
Pahang	6	5	1									
Selangor	14	6	5	1			1	1				
Negri Sembilan	6	3	2	1								
Malacca	4	2	2									
Johore	16	11	5									
Seats won	104	59	27	3	9	2	1	2	0	0	1	0
Seats contested	276	68	33	3	52	9	11	63		0	27	0

== Elected members by state ==
Shortcut:

Perlis | Kedah | Kelantan | Terengganu | Pulau Pinang | Perak | Pahang | Selangor | Negri Sembilan | Melaka | Johor

Unless noted otherwise, the MPs served the entire term of the parliament (from 18 May 1964 until 20 March 1969).

=== Perlis ===
No.	Federal Constituency	Member	Party
Alliance 2
P001	Perlis Utara	Othman Abdullah	Alliance (UMNO)
P002	Perlis Selatan	Mokhtar Ismail	Alliance (UMNO)

=== Kedah ===
No.	Federal Constituency	Member	Party
Alliance 12
P003	Jitra-Padang Terap	Fatimah Hashim	Alliance (UMNO)
P004	Kubang Pasu Barat	Senu Abdul Rahman	Alliance (UMNO)
P005	Kota Star Utara	Abdul Khalid Awang Osman	Alliance (UMNO)
P006	Alor Star	Lim Pee Hung	Alliance (MCA)
P007	Kuala Kedah	Tunku Abdul Rahman; Sultan Abdul Hamid Halim Shah	Alliance (UMNO)
P008	Kota Star Selatan	Mahathir Mohamad	Alliance (UMNO)
P009	Kedah Tengah	Khir Johari	Alliance (UMNO)
P010	Jerai	Hanafiah Hussain	Alliance (UMNO)
P011	Baling	Harun Abdullah	Alliance (UMNO)
P012	Sungei Patani	Mohamed Zahir Ismail	Alliance (UMNO)
P013	Kulim	Hanafi Mohd Yunus	Alliance (UMNO)
P014	Kulim-Bandar Bahru	Tai Kuan Yang	Alliance (MCA)

=== Kelantan ===
No.	Federal Constituency	Member	Party
PMIP 8 | Alliance 2
P015	Tumpat	Wan Hassan Wan Daud	PMIP
P016	Kelantan Hilir	Nik Abdul Aziz Nik Mat from 21 October 1967 (Note: Nik Abdul Aziz was elected to Parliament in the Kelantan Hilir by-election, 1967 following the death of Ahmad Abdullah.)	PMIP
P016	Kelantan Hilir	Ahmad Abdullah until 30 August 1967	PMIP
P017	Pasir Mas Hilir	Muhammad Fakhruddin Abdullah	PMIP
P018	Kota Bharu Hilir	Nik Ahmad Kamil Nik Mahmud	Alliance (UMNO)
P019	Bachok	Abu Bakar Hamzah from 27 June 1964 (Note: Abu Bakar was elected to Parliament in the Bachok by-election, 1964 following the death of Zulkiflee Muhammad.)	PMIP
P019	Bachok	Zulkiflee Muhammad until 6 May 1964	PMIP
P020	Kota Bharu Hulu	Hussain Rahimi Saman	PMIP
P021	Pasir Mas Hulu	Tengku Zaid Tengku Ahmad from 19 August 1967 (Note: Tengku Zaid was elected to Parliament in the Pasir Mas Hulu by-election, 1967 following the death of Abdul Samad Gul Ahmad Mianji.)	PMIP
P021	Pasir Mas Hulu	Abdul Samad Gul Ahmad Mianji until 3 July 1967	PMIP
P022	Pasir Puteh	Mohamad Asri Muda	PMIP
P023	Tanah Merah	Mustapha Ahmad	PMIP
P024	Ulu Kelantan	Hussein Sulaiman	Alliance (UMNO)

=== Trengganu ===
No.	Federal Constituency	Member	Party
Alliance 5 | PMIP 1
P025	Besut	Mohd. Daud Abdul Samad	PMIP
P026	Kuala Trengganu Utara	Wan Abdul Kadir Ismail	Alliance (UMNO)
P027	Kuala Trengganu Selatan	Abdullah Abdul Rahman	Alliance (UMNO)
P028	Dungun	Suleiman Ali	Alliance (UMNO)
P029	Kemaman	Wan Mokhtar Ahmad	Alliance (UMNO)
P030	Trengganu Tengah	Engku Muhsein Abdul Kadir	Alliance (UMNO)

=== Penang ===
No.	Federal Constituency	Member	Party
Alliance 6 | Socialist Front 1 | UDP 1
P031	Bagan	Tan Cheng Bee	Alliance (MCA)
P032	Seberang Tengah	Ibrahim Abdul Rahman	Alliance (UMNO)
P033	Seberang Selatan	Snawi Ismail from 31 October 1964 (Note: Snawi was elected to Parliament in the Seberang Selatan by-election, 1964 following the death of Mohamed Noordin Mastan.)	Alliance (UMNO)
P033	Seberang Selatan	Mohamed Noordin Mastan until 1 September 1964	Alliance (UMNO)
P034	Penang Utara	Geh Chong Keat	Alliance (MCA)
P035	Penang Selatan	Ismail Idris	Alliance (UMNO)
P036	Tanjong	Lim Chong Eu	UDP
P037	Dato' Kramat	Lim Kean Siew until 1 January 1969 (Note: Lim Kean Siew tendered his resignation as Member of Parliament for Dato' Kramat on 1 January 1969.)	Socialist Front (Lab)
P038	Seberang Utara	Ahmad Saaid	Alliance (UMNO)

=== Perak ===
No.	Federal Constituency	Member	Party
Alliance 18 | PPP 2
P039	Ulu Perak	Mohamed Ghazali Jawi	Alliance (UMNO)
P040	Krian Laut	Sulaiman Taib from 12 March 1966 (Note: Sulaiman was elected to Parliament in the Krian Laut by-election, 1966 following the death of Abdul Rauf Abdul Rahman.)	Alliance (UMNO)
P040	Krian Laut	Abdul Rauf Abdul Rahman until 1966	Alliance (UMNO)
P041	Krian Darat	Ramli Omar	Alliance (UMNO)
P042	Larut Utara	Tajudin Ali	Alliance (UMNO)
P043	Larut Selatan	Lim Swee Aun	Alliance (MCA)
P044	Bruas	Chew Biow Chuon from 4 June 1966 (Note: Chew was elected to Parliament in the Bruas by-election, 1966 following the death of Yeoh Tat Beng.)	Alliance (MCA)
P044	Bruas	Yeoh Tat Beng until 17 April 1966	Alliance (MCA)
P045	Sitiawan	Kam Woon Wah	Alliance (MCA)
P046	Sungei Siput	V. T. Sambanthan	Alliance (MIC)
P047	Kuala Kangsar	Megat Khas Megat Omar	Alliance (UMNO)
P048	Parit	Hussein Mohd Noordin	Alliance (UMNO)
P049	Ulu Kinta	Chin Foon	Alliance (MCA)
P050	Ipoh	D. R. Seenivasagam	PPP
P051	Menglembu	S. P. Seenivasagam	PPP
P052	Batu Gajah	Ng Fah Yam	Alliance (MCA)
P053	Kampar	Toh Theam Hock	Alliance (MCA)
P054	Hilir Perak	Othman Abdullah	Alliance (UMNO)
P055	Telok Anson	Ng Kam Poh	Alliance (MCA)
P056	Bagan Datoh	Sulaiman Bulon	Alliance (UMNO)
P057	Batang Padang	Abdul Hamid Khan	Alliance (UMNO)
P058	Tanjong Malim	Lee Seck Fun	Alliance (MCA)

=== Pahang ===
No.	Federal Constituency	Member	Party
Alliance 6
P059	Raub	Hamzah Abu Samah from 14 August 1967 (Note: Hamzah was elected to Parliament in the Raub by-election, 1967 following the death of Hussein Hassan.)	Alliance (UMNO)
P059	Raub	Hussein Hassan until 21 July 1967	Alliance (UMNO)
P060	Bentong	Chan Siang Sun	Alliance (MCA)
P061	Kuantan	Mohamed Taib from 11 November 1968 (Note: Mohamed was elected to Parliament in the Kuantan by-election, 1968 following the death of Abdul Rahman Talib.)	Alliance (UMNO)
P061	Kuantan	Abdul Rahman Talib until 18 October 1968	Alliance (UMNO)
P062	Pekan	Abdul Razak Hussein	Alliance (UMNO)
P063	Temerloh	Mohamed Yusof Mahmud	Alliance (UMNO)
P064	Lipis	Abdul Razak Hussin	Alliance (UMNO)

=== Selangor ===
No.	Federal Constituency	Member	Party
Alliance 12 | Socialist Front 1 | PAP 1
P065	Kuala Selangor	Raja Rome Raja Ma'amor	Alliance (UMNO)
P066	Batu	Tan Chee Khoon	Socialist Front (Lab)
P067	Kapar	Hamzah Alang	Alliance (UMNO)
P068	Rawang	Tunku Abdullah Tuanku Abdul Rahman	Alliance (UMNO)
P069	Langat	Zakaria Mohd Taib	Alliance (UMNO)
P070	Setapak	Chan Seong Yoon	Alliance (MCA)
P071	Bangsar	Devan Nair	PAP
P071	Bangsar	Devan Nair	DAP
P072	Bukit Bintang	Tan Toh Hong	Alliance (MCA)
P073	Damansara	Michael Chen Wing Sum	Alliance (MCA)
P074	Klang	V. Manickavasagam	Alliance (MIC)
P075	Kuala Langat	Mohd. Tahir Abdul Majid	Alliance (UMNO)
P076	Sepang	Lee Siok Yew	Alliance (MCA)
P077	Sabak Bernam	Mustapha Abdul Jabar	Alliance (UMNO)
P078	Ulu Selangor	Khaw Kai Boh	Alliance (MCA)

=== Negri Sembilan ===
No.	Federal Constituency	Member	Party
Alliance 6
P079	Kuala Pilah	Bahaman Samsudin	Alliance (UMNO)
P080	Seremban Timor	Quek Kai Dong	Alliance (MCA)
P081	Rembau-Tampin	Redza Mohd Said	Alliance (UMNO)
P082	Port Dickson	T. Mahima Singh	Alliance (MIC)
P083	Jelebu-Jempol	Mohamed Idris Matsil	Alliance (UMNO)
P084	Seremban Barat	Siow Loong Hin	Alliance (MCA)

=== Malacca ===
No.	Federal Constituency	Member	Party
Alliance 4
P085	Malacca Tengah	Tan Siew Sin	Alliance (MCA)
P086	Bandar Malacca	Tan Kee Gak	Alliance (MCA)
P087	Malacca Utara	Abdul Ghani Ishak	Alliance (UMNO)
P088	Malacca Selatan	Abdul Karim Abu	Alliance (UMNO)

=== Johore ===
No.	Federal Constituency	Member	Party
Alliance 16
P089	Muar Dalam	Abdul Aziz Ishak	Alliance (UMNO)
P090	Segamat Selatan	Lee San Choon	Alliance (MCA)
P091	Muar Pantai	Seah Teng Ngiab	Alliance (MCA)
P092	Muar Selatan	Awang Hassan	Alliance (UMNO)
P093	Batu Pahat	Soh Ah Teck	Alliance (MCA)
P094	Batu Pahat Dalam	Syed Esa Alwee (Deputy Speaker)	Alliance (UMNO)
P095	Kluang Utara	Tiah Eng Bee	Alliance (MCA)
P096	Johore Tenggara	Syed Jaafar Albar	Alliance (UMNO)
P097	Pontian Utara	Sardon Jubir	Alliance (UMNO)
P098	Pontian Selatan	Ali Ahmad	Alliance (UMNO)
P099	Kluang Selatan	Chan Chong Wen	Alliance (MCA)
P100	Johore Bahru Timor	Fatimah Abdul Majid	Alliance (UMNO)
P101	Johore Bahru Barat	Rahmat Daud	Alliance (UMNO)
P102	Johore Timor	Ismail Abdul Rahman	Alliance (UMNO)
P103	Segamat Utara	Musa Hitam from 19 October 1968 (Note: Musa was elected to Parliament in the Segamat Utara by-election, 1968 following the death of Abdullah Mohd Salleh.)	Alliance (UMNO)
P103	Segamat Utara	Abdullah Mohd Salleh until 27 August 1968	Alliance (UMNO)
P104	Muar Utara	Ahmad Arshad	Alliance (UMNO)

== Appointed and nominated members by state ==
Unless noted otherwise, the MPs served the entire term of the parliament (from 18 May 1964 until 20 March 1969).

=== Singapore ===
no P.	Member	Party
15 seats
P.105	Abdul Rahim Ishak until 9 August 1965	PAP
P.106	Chia Thye Poh until 9 August 1965	Barisan Sosialis
P.106	Edmund William Barker from 25 November 1964 until 9 August 1965	PAP
P.108	Goh Keng Swee until 9 August 1965	PAP
P.109	Ho See Beng until 25 November 1964	PAP
P.110	Jek Yeun Thong until 9 August 1965	PAP
P.111	Kow Kee Seng until 9 August 1965	Barisan Sosialis
P.112	Lee Kuan Yew until 9 August 1965	PAP
P.113	Lim Huan Boon until 9 August 1965	Barisan Sosialis
P.114	Lim Kim San until 9 August 1965	PAP
P.115	Ong Pang Boon until 9 August 1965	PAP
P.116	Othman Wok until 9 August 1965	PAP
P.117	S. Rajaratnam until 9 August 1965	PAP
	Toh Chin Chye until 9 August 1965	PAP
P.118	Wee Toon Boon until 9 August 1965	PAP
P.119	Yong Nyuk Lin until 9 August 1965	PAP

=== Sabah ===
No	Member	Party
16 seats
P.120	Abdul Rashid Jais	
P.120	Aliuddin Harun until 11 December 1967	
P.	Amadeus Mathew Leong	
P.	Donald Aloysius Marmaduke Stephens until 2 November 1965	UNKO
P.	Francis Chia Nyuk Tong	
P.	Ganie Gilong	UNKO
P.	Ganing Jangkat	
P.	Joe Manjaji	UNKO
P.	John Ondu Majakil from 21 March 1966	
P.	Khoo Siak Chiew until 10 May 1966	SCA
P.	Mohamed Dara Langpad	
P.	Mohd. Arif Salleh	
P.	Pengiran Tahir Pengiran Petra	
P.	Peter Lo Sui Yin	SCA
P.	Rafael Ancheta from 18 January 1968	
P.	S. Fazul Rahman	
P.	Stanley Ho Ngun Khiu	
P.135	Yeh Pao Tze	SCA

=== Sarawak ===
No	Member	Party name
24 seats
P.136	Abang Ikhwan Abang Hallimid until 7 December 1967	PANAS
P.136	Abang Othman Abang Moasili until 24 September 1965	PANAS
P.137	Abdul Rahman Ya'kub	BARJASA
P.137	Abdul Taib Mahmud from 18 January 1968	BARJASA
P.136	Ajibah Abol	BARJASA
P.137	Banyang Janting	PESAKA
P.138	Chia Chin Shin	SUPP
P.139	Dagok Randen from 10 November 1965	PANAS
P.140	Edmund Langgu Saga	SNAP
P.141	Edwin Tangkun	SNAP
P.142	Francis Umpau Empam until 1 October 1965	PESAKA
P.143	Jinggut Attan	PESAKA
P.144	Jonathan Bangau Renang	PESAKA
P.145	Jugah Barieng	PESAKA
P.146	Kadam Kiai until 1968	SNAP
P.147	Khoo Peng Loong	SUPP
P.148	Ling Beng Siew	SCA
P.149	Muhammad Su'aut Muhd. Tahir	
P.150	Ong Kee Hui	SUPP
P.151	Sandom Nyuak until 12 December 1967	PESAKA
P.152	Sim Boon Liang	SUPP
P.153	Sng Chin Joo	SUPP
P.154	Stephen Yong Kuet Tze	SUPP
P.155	Tama Weng Tinggang Wan from 6 July 1964	SUPP
P.156	Tan Tsak Yu	PANAS
P.157	Thomas Kana from 10 November 1965	PESAKA
P.159	Wan Abdul Rahman Tuanku Bujang	BARJASA
P.159	Wan Alwi Tuanku Ibrahim from 18 January 1968	BARJASA
