= Batu Pahat Dalam =

Johor constituency

Defunct federal constituency
- Legislature: Dewan Rakyat
- Constituency created: 1958
- Constituency abolished: 1974
- First contested: 1959
- Last contested: 1969

Batu Pahat Dalam was a federal constituency in Johor, Malaysia, that was represented in the Dewan Rakyat from 1959 to 1974.

The federal constituency was created in the 1974 redistribution and was mandated to return a single member to the Dewan Rakyat under the first past the post voting system.

== History ==
It was abolished in 1974 when it was redistributed.

=== Representation history ===
Members of Parliament for Batu Pahat Dalam
Parliament	No	Years	Member	Party	Vote Share
Constituency split from Johore Tengah
Parliament of the Federation of Malaya					
1st	P094	1959-1963	Syed Esa Alwee (سيد عيسى علوي)	Alliance (UMNO)	Uncontested
Parliament of Malaysia					
1st	P094	1963-1964	Syed Esa Alwee (سيد عيسى علوي)	Alliance (UMNO)	Uncontested
2nd	P094	1964-1969	Syed Esa Alwee (سيد عيسى علوي)	Alliance (UMNO)	17,225; 84.93%
		1969-1971	Parliament was suspended		
3rd	P094	1971-1973	Fatimah Abdul Majid (فاطمه عبدالمجيد)	Alliance (UMNO)	15,979; 75.94%
3rd	P094	1973-1974	Fatimah Abdul Majid (فاطمه عبدالمجيد)	BN (UMNO)	15,979; 75.94%
Constituency abolished, split into Batu Pahat, Sri Gading and Ayer Hitam

=== State constituency ===
Parliamentary constituency	State constituency						
Parliamentary constituency	1954–59*	1959–1974	1974–1986	1986–1995	1995–2004	2004–2018	2018–present
Batu Pahat Dalam		Ayer Hitam					
Batu Pahat Dalam		Tanjong Sembrong					

=== Historical boundaries ===
State Constituency	Area
State Constituency	1959
Ayer Hitam	Kampung Bukit Batu; Koris; Parit Raja; Senggarang; Sri Gading
Tanjong Sembrong	Ayer Hitam; Lam Lee; Parit Yaani; Tongkang Pechah; Yong Peng

== Election results ==
Malaysian general election, 1969: Batu Pahat Dalam
Party	Candidate	Votes	%	∆%
Alliance	Fatimah Abdul Majid	15,979	75.94	▼8.99
GERAKAN	Sakroni Ahmad	5,062	24.06	▲24.06
Total valid votes		21,041	100.00	
Total rejected ballots		1,887		
Unreturned ballots		0		
Turnout		22,928	70.19	▼9.70
Registered electors		32,664		
Majority		10,917	51.88	▼17.98
Alliance hold		Swing		

Malaysian general election, 1964: Batu Pahat Dalam
Party	Candidate	Votes	%	∆%
Alliance	Syed Esa Alwee	17,225	84.93	▲84.93
UDP	Sakroni Ahmad	3,056	15.07	▲15.07
Total valid votes		20,281	100.00	
Total rejected ballots		2,460		
Unreturned ballots		0		
Turnout		22,741	79.89	▲3.18
Registered electors		28,465		
Majority		14,169	69.86	▲39.60
Alliance hold		Swing		

Malayan general election, 1959: Batu Pahat Dalam
Party	Candidate	Votes	%
Alliance	Syed Esa Alwee	9,495	54.59
Independent	Tan Suan Kok	4,238	24.36
National Party	Daud Abdul Hamid	3,661	21.05
Total valid votes		17,394	100.00
Total rejected ballots		128	
Unreturned ballots		0	
Turnout		17,522	76.71
Registered electors		22,842	
Majority		5,257	30.26
This was a new constituency created.
