= Members of the Dewan Rakyat, 1st Malayan Parliament =

Malaysian federal legislators serving 1959-64

1st Parliament of the Federation of Malaya
| ← | Federal Legislative Council (1955–59) | 2nd Parliament | → |

Overview
- Legislative body: Parliament of the Federation of Malaya
- Jurisdiction: Federation of Malaya (later Malaysia)
- Meeting place: Tunku Abdul Rahman Hall
- Term: 11 September 1959 – 1 March 1964
- Election: 1959 general election
- Government: Second Rahman cabinet
- Website: www.parlimen.gov.my

Dewan Rakyat
- Members: 104 (until 2 November 1963); 159
- Speaker: Mohamad Noah Omar
- Secretary: C. A. Fredericks
- Prime Minister: Tunku Abdul Rahman
- Leader of the Opposition: Burhanuddin al-Helmy
- Party control: Alliance

Sovereign
- Yang di-Pertuan Agong: Tuanku Abdul Rahman (until 1 April 1960); Tuanku Hisamuddin Alam Shah (until 1 September 1960); Tuanku Syed Putra

Sessions
- 1st: 11 September 1959 – 24 February 1960
- 2nd: 19 April 1960 – 11 February 1961
- 3rd: 19 April 1961 – 31 January 1962
- 4th: 25 April 1962 – 13 March 1963
- 5th: 22 May 1963 – 11 January 1964

This is a list of the members of the Dewan Rakyat (House of Representatives) of the First Parliament of the Federation of Malaya (known as the Parliament of Malaysia after 2 November 1963), elected in 1959.

== Composition ==
| State | # of Seats | UMNO Seats | MCA Seats | MIC Seats | PMIP Seats | PPP Seats | Lab Seats | Ra'ayat Seats | Negara Seats | MP Seats | IND Seats |
|---|---|---|---|---|---|---|---|---|---|---|---|
| Perlis | 2 | 2 | | | | | | | | | |
| Kedah | 12 | 10 | 2 | | | | | | | | |
| Kelantan | 10 | 1 | | | 9 | | | | | | |
| Trengganu | 6 | 1 | | | 4 | | | | 1 | | |
| Penang | 8 | 3 | 2 | | | | 3 | | | | |
| Perak | 20 | 9 | 5 | 1 | | 4 | | | | | 1 |
| Pahang | 6 | 5 | 1 | | | | | | | | |
| Selangor | 14 | 5 | 3 | 1 | | | 3 | 2 | | | |
| Negri Sembilan | 6 | 3 | | 1 | | | | | | | 2 |
| Malacca | 4 | 2 | 1 | | | | | | | 1 | |
| Johore | 16 | 11 | 5 | | | | | | | | |
| Seats won | 104 | 52 | 19 | 3 | 13 | 4 | 6 | 2 | 1 | 1 | 3 |
| Seats contested | 259 | 70 | 31 | 3 | 58 | 19 | 38 | | 9 | 2 | 29 |

== Elected members by state ==
Shortcut:

Perlis | Kedah | Kelantan | Terengganu | Pulau Pinang | Perak | Pahang | Selangor | Negeri Sembilan | Melaka | Johor

Unless noted otherwise, the MPs served the entire term of the parliament (from 11 September 1959 until 1 March 1964).

=== Perlis ===
| No. | Federal Constituency | Member | Party |
|---|---|---|---|
Alliance 2
| P001 | Perlis Utara | Othman Abdullah | Alliance (UMNO) |
| P002 | Perlis Selatan | Mokhtar Ismail | Alliance (UMNO) |

=== Kedah ===
| No. | Federal Constituency | Member | Party |
|---|---|---|---|
Alliance 12
| P003 | Jitra-Padang Terap | Fatimah Hashim | Alliance (UMNO) |
| P004 | Kubang Pasu Barat | Azahari Ibrahim | Alliance (UMNO) |
| P005 | Kota Star Utara | Abdul Khalid Awang Osman | Alliance (UMNO) |
| P006 | Alor Star | Lim Joo Kong | Alliance (MCA) |
| P007 | Kuala Kedah | Tunku Abdul Rahman; Sultan Abdul Hamid Halim Shah | Alliance (UMNO) |
| P008 | Kota Star Selatan | Wan Sulaiman Wan Tam | Alliance (UMNO) |
| P009 | Kedah Tengah | Khir Johari from 30 September 1959 | Alliance (UMNO) |
| P010 | Jerai | Mohamed Ismail Mohd Yusof | Alliance (UMNO) |
| P011 | Baling | Harun Abdullah | Alliance (UMNO) |
| P012 | Sungei Patani | Abdul Samad Osman | Alliance (UMNO) |
| P013 | Kulim Utara | Hanafi Mohd Yunus | Alliance (UMNO) |
| P014 | Kulim-Bandar Bahru | Tan Tye Chek | Alliance (MCA) |

=== Kelantan ===
| No. | Federal Constituency | Member | Party |
|---|---|---|---|
PMIP 9 | Alliance 1
| P015 | Tumpat | Hassan Ahmad | PMIP |
| P016 | Kelantan Hilir | Wan Mustapha Ali | PMIP |
| P017 | Pasir Mas Hilir | Nik Man Nik Mohamed | PMIP |
| P018 | Kota Bharu Hilir | Ahmad Abdullah | PMIP |
| P019 | Bachok | Zulkiflee Muhammad | PMIP |
| P020 | Kota Bharu Hulu | Hussain Rahimi Saman | PMIP |
| P021 | Pasir Mas Hulu | Mohamed Hanifah Abdul Ghani | PMIP |
| P022 | Pasir Puteh | Mohamad Asri Muda | PMIP |
| P023 | Tanah Merah | Othman Abdullah | PMIP |
| P024 | Ulu Kelantan | Tengku Indra Petra Abdullah Ibrahim of Kelantan | Alliance (UMNO) |

=== Trengganu ===
| No. | Federal Constituency | Member | Party |
|---|---|---|---|
PMIP 4 | Alliance 2
| P025 | Besut | Burhanuddin al-Helmy | PMIP |
| P026 | Kuala Trengganu Utara | Hasan Adli Mohd Arshad | PMIP |
| P027 | Kuala Trengganu Selatan | Ismail Kassim from 19 March 1962 (Note: Ismail was elected to Parliament in the Kuala Trengganu Selatan by-election, 1962 following the death of Onn Jaafar of Parti Negara.) | Alliance (UMNO) |
| P027 | Kuala Trengganu Selatan | Onn Jaafar until 19 January 1962 | Parti Negara |
| P028 | Dungun | Che Khadijah Mohd Sidik | PMIP |
| P029 | Kemaman | Wan Yahya Wan Mohamed | Alliance (UMNO) |
| P030 | Trengganu Tengah | Harun Pilus | PMIP |

=== Penang ===
| No. | Federal Constituency | Member | Party |
|---|---|---|---|
Alliance 5 | Socialist Front 3
| P031 | Bagan | Tan Cheng Bee | Alliance (MCA) |
| P032 | Seberang Tengah | Ibrahim Abdul Rahman | Alliance (UMNO) |
| P033 | Seberang Selatan | Veerappen Veerathan | Socialist Front (Lab) |
| P034 | Penang Utara | Geh Chong Keat | Alliance (MCA) |
| P035 | Penang Selatan | Ismail Idris | Alliance (UMNO) |
| P036 | Tanjong | Tan Phock Kin | Socialist Front (Lab) |
| P037 | Dato' Kramat | Lim Kean Siew | Socialist Front (Lab) |
| P038 | Seberang Utara | Ahmad Saaid | Alliance (UMNO) |

=== Perak ===
| No. | Federal Constituency | Member | Party |
|---|---|---|---|
Alliance 13 | PPP 5 | IND 2
| P039 | Ulu Perak | Mohamed Nor Mohd Dahan | Alliance (UMNO) |
| P040 | Krian Laut | Abdul Rauf Abdul Rahman | Alliance (UMNO) |
| P041 | Krian Darat | Ahmad Yusof | Alliance (UMNO) |
| P042 | Larut Utara | Tajudin Ali | Alliance (UMNO) |
| P043 | Larut Selatan | Lim Swee Aun | Alliance (MCA) |
| P044 | Bruas | Yeoh Tat Beng | IND |
| P045 | Sitiawan | Yong Woo Ming | Alliance (MCA) |
| P046 | Sungei Siput | V. T. Sambanthan | Alliance (MIC) |
| P047 | Kuala Kangsar | Abdullah Abdul Raof | Alliance (UMNO) |
| P048 | Parit | Hussein Mohd Noordin | Alliance (UMNO) |
| P049 | Ulu Kinta | Chan Swee Ho | PPP |
| P050 | Ipoh | D. R. Seenivasagam | PPP |
| P051 | Menglembu | S. P. Seenivasagam | PPP |
| P052 | Batu Gajah | Khong Kok Yat | PPP |
| P053 | Kampar | Chan Yoon Onn from 18 May 1960 (Note: Chan was elected to Parliament in the Kampar by-election, 1960 following the disqualification of Leong Kee Nyean.) | PPP |
| P053 | Kampar | Leong Kee Nyean until 31 March 1960 | Alliance (MCA) |
| P054 | Hilir Perak | Mohamed Abbas Ahmad | Alliance (UMNO) |
| P055 | Telok Anson | Too Joon Hing from 30 May 1961 (Note: Too was elected to Parliament in the Telok Anson by-election, 1961 following the death of Woo Saik Hong.) | IND |
| P055 | Telok Anson | Woo Saik Hong until 6 April 1961 | Alliance (MCA) |
| P056 | Bagan Datoh | Yahya Ahmad | Alliance (UMNO) |
| P057 | Batang Padang | Abdul Hamid Khan | Alliance (UMNO) |
| P058 | Tanjong Malim | Lee Seck Fun | Alliance (MCA) |

=== Pahang ===
| No. | Federal Constituency | Member | Party |
|---|---|---|---|
Alliance 6
| P059 | Raub | Hussein Hassan | Alliance (UMNO) |
| P060 | Bentong | Chan Siang Sun | Alliance (MCA) |
| P061 | Kuantan | Abdul Rahman Talib | Alliance (UMNO) |
| P062 | Pekan | Abdul Razak Hussein | Alliance (UMNO) |
| P063 | Temerloh | Mohamed Yusof Mahmud | Alliance (UMNO) |
| P064 | Lipis | Abdul Razak Hussin from 20 October 1962 (Note: Abdul Razak was elected to Parliament in the Lipis by-election, 1962 following the death of Mohamed Sulong Mohd Ali.) | Alliance (UMNO) |
| P064 | Lipis | Mohamed Sulong Mohd. Ali until 24 August 1962 | Alliance (UMNO) |

=== Selangor ===
| No. | Federal Constituency | Member | Party |
|---|---|---|---|
Alliance 9 | Socialist Front 5
| P065 | Kuala Selangor | Mohamed Dahari Mohd Ali | Alliance (UMNO) |
| P066 | Batu | Ng Ann Teck | Socialist Front (Lab) |
| P067 | Kapar | Hamzah Alang | Alliance (UMNO) |
| P068 | Rawang | Liu Yoong Peng | Socialist Front (Lab) |
| P069 | Langat | Zakaria Mohd Taib | Alliance (UMNO) |
| P070 | Setapak | Ahmad Boestamam | Socialist Front (Ra'ayat) |
| P071 | Bangsar | V. David | Socialist Front (Lab) |
| P072 | Bukit Bintang | Cheah Theam Swee | Alliance (MCA) |
| P073 | Damansara | Karam Singh Veriah | Socialist Front (Ra'ayat) |
| P074 | Klang | V. Manickavasagam | Alliance (MIC) |
| P075 | Kuala Langat | Abdul Aziz Ishak | Alliance (UMNO) |
| P075 | Kuala Langat | Abdul Aziz Ishak | NCP |
| P076 | Sepang | Lee Siok Yew | Alliance (MCA) |
| P077 | Sabak Bernam | Syed Hashim Syed Ajam | Alliance (UMNO) |
| P078 | Ulu Selangor | Omar Ong Yoke Lin | Alliance (MCA) |

=== Negri Sembilan ===
| No. | Federal Constituency | Member | Party |
|---|---|---|---|
Alliance 4 | IND 2
| P079 | Kuala Pilah | Bahaman Samsudin | Alliance (UMNO) |
| P080 | Seremban Timor | Chin See Yin | IND |
| P081 | Rembau-Tampin | Redza Mohd Said | Alliance (UMNO) |
| P082 | Port Dickson | T. Mahima Singh | Alliance (MIC) |
| P083 | Jelebu-Jempol | Mohamed Ujang | Alliance (UMNO) |
| P084 | Seremban Barat | Quek Kai Dong | IND |

=== Malacca ===
| No. | Federal Constituency | Member | Party |
|---|---|---|---|
Alliance 3 | MP 1
| P085 | Malacca Tengah | Tan Siew Sin | Alliance (MCA) |
| P086 | Bandar Malacca | Tan Kee Gak | MP |
| P087 | Malacca Utara | Abdul Ghani Ishak | Alliance (UMNO) |
| P088 | Malacca Selatan | Hassan Mansor | Alliance (UMNO) |

=== Johore ===
| No. | Federal Constituency | Member | Party |
|---|---|---|---|
Alliance 16
| P089 | Muar Dalam | Abdul Aziz Ishak | Alliance (UMNO) |
| P090 | Segamat Selatan | Teoh Chze Chong | Alliance (MCA) |
| P091 | Muar Pantai | Seah Teng Ngiab | Alliance (MCA) |
| P092 | Muar Selatan | Awang Hassan from 28 December 1963 (Note: Awang was elected to Parliament in the Muar Selatan by-election, 1963 following the death of Sulaiman Abdul Rahman.) | Alliance (UMNO) |
| P092 | Muar Selatan | Suleiman Abdul Rahman until 6 November 1963 | Alliance (UMNO) |
| P093 | Batu Pahat | Kang Kok Seng | Alliance (MCA) |
| P094 | Batu Pahat Dalam | Syed Esa Alwee (Deputy Speaker) | Alliance (UMNO) |
| P095 | Kluang Utara | Lee San Choon | Alliance (MCA) |
| P096 | Johore Tenggara | Syed Jaafar Albar | Alliance (UMNO) |
| P097 | Pontian Utara | Sardon Jubir | Alliance (UMNO) |
| P098 | Pontian Selatan | Zainon Munshi Sulaiman | Alliance (UMNO) |
| P099 | Kluang Selatan | Chan Chong Wen | Alliance (MCA) |
| P100 | Johore Bahru Timor | Mohamad Noah Omar (Speaker) | Alliance (UMNO) |
| P101 | Johore Bahru Barat | Ahmad Mohamed Shah | Alliance (UMNO) |
| P102 | Johore Timor | Ismail Abdul Rahman | Alliance (UMNO) |
| P103 | Segamat Utara | Abdullah Mohd Salleh | Alliance (UMNO) |
| P104 | Muar Utara | Ahmad Arshad | Alliance (UMNO) |

== Appointed and nominated members by state ==
Unless noted otherwise, the MPs served from 2 November 1963 until 1 March 1964.

=== Singapore ===
| Member | Party |
|---|---|
15 seats
| Abdul Rahim Ishak | PAP |
| Chia Thye Poh | Barisan Sosialis |
| Goh Keng Swee | PAP |
| Ho See Beng | PAP |
| Jek Yeun Thong | PAP |
| Kow Kee Seng | Barisan Sosialis |
| Lee Kuan Yew | PAP |
| Lim Huan Boon | Barisan Sosialis |
| Lim Kim San | PAP |
| Ong Pang Boon | PAP |
| Othman Wok | PAP |
| S. Rajaratnam from 18 December 1963 | PAP |
| Toh Chin Chye | PAP |
| Wee Toon Boon | PAP |
| Yong Nyuk Lin | PAP |

=== Sabah ===
| Member | Party |
|---|---|
16 seats
| Aliuddin Harun | |
| Amadeus Mathew Leong | |
| Donald Aloysius Marmaduke Stephens | UNKO |
| Ganie Gilong | UNKO |
| Ganing Jangkat | |
| Hong Teck Guan | SCA |
| Jhumah Salim | |
| Mahali Matjakir | |
| Mohamed Dara Langpad | |
| Mohamed Dun Banir | |
| Mohd. Arif Salleh | |
| Ngui Ah Kui | SCA |
| Peter J. Mojuntin from 3 January 1964 | UNKO |
| Peter Lo Sui Yin | SCA |
| Stanley Ho Ngun Khiu | |
| Yeh Pao Tze | SCA |

=== Sarawak ===
| Member | Party |
|---|---|
24 seats
| Abang Ikhwan | PANAS |
| Abang Othman Abang Moasili | PANAS |
| Abdul Rahman Ya'kub | BARJASA |
| Ajibah Abol | BARJASA |
| Awang Daud Matusin | IND |
| Banyang Janting | PESAKA |
| Charles Linang | SUPP |
| Dagok Randen | PANAS |
| Edmund Langgu Saga | SNAP |
| Edwin Tangkun | SNAP |
| Francis Umpau Empam | PESAKA |
| Jinggut Attan | PESAKA |
| Jonathan Bangau Renang | PESAKA |
| Jugah Barieng | PESAKA |
| Kadam Kiai | SNAP |
| Ling Beng Siew | SCA |
| Muhammad Su'aut Muhd. Tahir | |
| Sim Boon Liang | SUPP |
| Sng Chin Joo | SUPP |
| Song Thian Cheok | SUPP |
| Sandom Nyuak | PESAKA |
| Stephen Yong Kuet Tze | SUPP |
| Tan Tsak Yu | PANAS |
| Wan Abdul Rahman Tuanku Bujang | BARJASA |
