= Johore Bahru Timor =

Johor constituency

Defunct federal constituency
- Legislature: Dewan Rakyat
- Constituency created: 1958
- Constituency abolished: 1974
- First contested: 1959
- Last contested: 1969

Johore Bahru Timor was a federal constituency in Johor, Malaysia, that was represented in the Dewan Rakyat from 1959 to 1974.

The federal constituency was created in the 1974 redistribution and was mandated to return a single member to the Dewan Rakyat under the first past the post voting system.

== History ==
It was abolished in 1974 when it was redistributed.

=== Representation history ===
Members of Parliament for Johore Bahru Timor
Parliament	No	Years	Member	Party	Vote Share
Constituency split from Johore Bahru
Parliament of the Federation of Malaya
1st	P100	1959-1963	Mohamad Noah Omar (محمد نوح عمر)	Alliance (UMNO)	7,771; 64.72%
Parliament of Malaysia
1st	P100	1963-1964	Mohamad Noah Omar (محمد نوح عمر)	Alliance (UMNO)	7,771; 64.72%
2nd	P100	1964-1969	Fatimah Abdul Majid (فاطمه عبدالمجيد)	Alliance (UMNO)	12,600; 67.47%
		1969-1971	Parliament was suspended		
3rd	P100	1971-1973	Hussein Onn (حسين عون)	Alliance (UMNO)	12,565; 63.59%
3rd	P100	1973-1974	Hussein Onn (حسين عون)	BN (UMNO)	12,565; 63.59%
Constituency abolished, renamed to Johore Bahru

=== State constituency ===
Parliamentary constituency	State constituency						
Parliamentary constituency	1954–59*	1959–1974	1974–1986	1986–1995	1995–2004	2004–2018	2018–present
Johore Bahru Timor		Plentong					
Johore Bahru Timor		Tanjong Petri					

=== Historical boundaries ===
State Constituency	Area
State Constituency	1959
Plentong	Johor Jaya; Plentong; Pasir Gudang; Ulu Tiram; Taman Sri Saujana
Tanjong Petri	Kampung Dato Onn; Kampung Dato Sulaiman Menteri; Kebun Teh; Larkin; Tanjung Puteri

== Election results ==
Malaysian general election, 1969: Johore Bahru Timor
Party	Candidate	Votes	%	∆%
Alliance	Hussein Onn	12,565	63.59	▼3.88
DAP	Lee Ah Meng	7,193	36.41	▲36.41
Total valid votes		19,758	100.00	
Total rejected ballots		1,009		
Unreturned ballots		0		
Turnout		20,767	72.29	▼6.17
Registered electors		28,729		
Majority		5,372	27.18	▼11.68
Alliance hold		Swing		

Malaysian general election, 1964: Johore Bahru Timor
Party	Candidate	Votes	%	∆%
Alliance	Fatimah Abdul Majid	12,600	67.47	▲2.75
Socialist Front	Tan Ah Ngoh	5,343	28.61	▼6.67
PAP	Mohamed Noor Jettey	733	3.92	▲3.92
Total valid votes		18,676	100.00	
Total rejected ballots		730		
Unreturned ballots		0		
Turnout		19,406	78.46	▲0.36
Registered electors		24,735		
Majority		7,257	38.86	▲9.42
Alliance hold		Swing		

Malayan general election, 1959: Johore Bahru Timor
Party	Candidate	Votes	%
Alliance	Mohamad Noah Omar	7,771	64.72
Socialist Front	Chu Choon Yong	4,236	35.28
Total valid votes		12,007	100.00
Total rejected ballots		112	
Unreturned ballots		0	
Turnout		12,119	78.10
Registered electors		15,518	
Majority		3,535	29.44
This was a new constituency created.
