= Mohamed Noah Omar =

Malaysian politician

Yang Berbahagia Tan Sri Dato' Mohamed Noah Omar PMN SPMJ SSIJ DPMJ DPMB PPM PIS II JP
- محمد نوح عمر
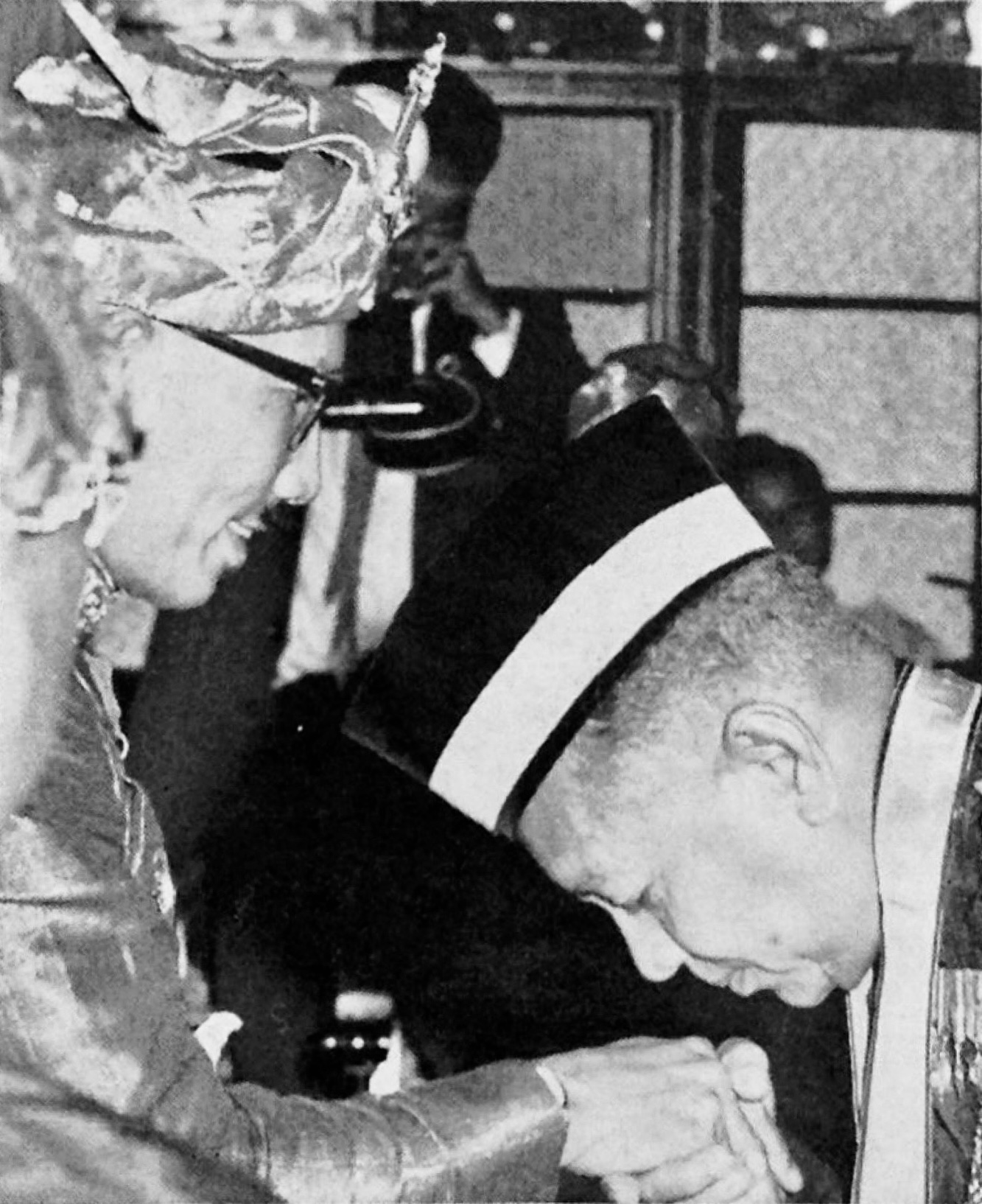
- Noah kissing the hand of Sultan Omar Ali Saifuddien III in 1960

1st Speaker of the Dewan Rakyat
- In office 1 September 1959 – 29 February 1964
- Monarchs: Abdul Rahman; Hisamuddin; Syed Putra Jamalullail
- Prime Minister: Tunku Abdul Rahman
- Preceded by: Office established
- Succeeded by: Syed Esa Alwee

3rd President of the Dewan Negara
- In office 24 February 1969 – 28 July 1970
- Monarch: Ismail Nasiruddin
- Prime Minister: Tunku Abdul Rahman
- Preceded by: Syed Sheh Hassan Barakbah
- Succeeded by: Abdul Hamid Khan

Member of the Federation of Malaya / Malaysia Parliament for Johore Bahru Timor
- In office 1959–1964
- Preceded by: Constituency established
- Succeeded by: Fatimah Abdul Majid
- Majority: 3,535 (1959)

Personal details
- Born: Mohamed Noah bin Omar; 13 August 1897 Bandar Maharani, Muar, Johor
- Died: 6 September 1991 (aged 94) Kuala Lumpur, Malaysia
- Resting place: Makam Pahlawan, Masjid Negara, Kuala Lumpur
- Party: United Malays National Organisation (UMNO) (1946–1991)
- Spouse(s): Maimun Abdul Manaf; Siti Amirah Kusuma
- Relations: Abdul Razak Hussein (son-in-law); Hussein Onn (son-in-law); Najib Razak (grandson); Hishammuddin Hussein (grandson); Nazir Razak (grandson); Nazifuddin Najib (great-grandson); Onn Hafiz Ghazi (great-grandson)
- Children: 5 (including Rahah, Suhailah)
- Education: Syrian Protestant College, Beirut, Lebanon

Mohamed Noah bin Omar (Jawi: محمد نوح بن عمر; 13 August 1897 – 6 September 1991) was a Malaysian politician, nationalist, and businessman. He was a founding member and the first chairman of the United Malays National Organisation (UMNO), playing a key role in mobilising Malay opposition to the Malayan Union and shaping early nationalist movements. Following independence, he became the first Speaker of the Dewan Rakyat and later served as the third President of the Dewan Negara, contributing to the establishment of Malaysia's parliamentary traditions.

Beyond politics, Mohamed Noah was involved in major business ventures, notably co-founding Genting Highlands alongside Lim Goh Tong, and held leadership roles in corporate entities such as the MUI Group. He is remembered as the patriarch of a prominent political family, with descendants including two Malaysian prime ministers and several senior politicians.

== Early life ==
Noah Omar was born in Bandar Maharani, Muar, Johor on 13 August 1897. He was a descendant of the 17th-century Bugis ruler known as Raja Chempa, with his ancestors holding the hereditary title of Orang Kaya in Muar.

Following the death of his father when he was an infant, Noah was raised by his mother and stepfather, a religious teacher in Muar. He received his early education at a Malay school in Muar and later pursued religious studies at Al-Madarasah Al-Arabiah Al-Khairiah. He continued his studies at the Syrian Protestant College in Beirut, Lebanon, where he acquired the nickname "Noah Beirut".

After returning to Malaya, he worked as a lorry driver and clerk before joining the Johor civil service.

== Career ==
=== Politics ===
Noah was very active in the Malayan nationalist movement along with his contemporaries, Onn Jaafar, Haji Anwar bin Abdul Malik and Haji Syed Alwi bin Syed Sheikh al-Hadi. Together they founded UMNO on 1 May 1946 as a means to rally the Malays against the Malayan Union, which was perceived as threatening Malay privileges and the position of the Malay rulers.

After independence, he became the first Speaker of the Dewan Rakyat, the lower house of Parliament between 1959 and 1964. Subsequently, he was President of the Dewan Negara, the upper house, from 1968 to 1970.

Noah was suggested by Tunku as a candidate for Chief Minister of Sarawak in 1963.

=== Business ===
Noah together with Lim Goh Tong formed a private company called Genting Highlands Berhad (now Genting Group), which was set up on 27 April 1965 to construct Genting Highlands. Lim successfully obtained approval for the alienation of 12,000 acres (49 km^{2}) and 2,800 acres (11 km^{2}) of land from the Pahang and Selangor state governments respectively between the years 1965 and 1970. Its primary hill resort, Resort World Genting is currently Malaysia's only casino and highland resort. A mosque built at the hill station is named after him.

In 1970, Noah was appointed a director of MUI Group. He was appointed Chairman of the Group in 1980.

== Personal life ==
In 1921, Mohamed Noah married Maimun binti Haji Abdul Manaf, the daughter of the Kadi of Muar and sister of his close friend and fellow Beirut student, Haji Mahmud bin Haji Abdul Manaf. Known for his disciplined character and strong religious values, Noah maintained a household that emphasized education, integrity, and service to the community. The couple had four children: Fakhriah, Abu Rais, Suhaila, and Rahah.

Fakhriah married Datuk Abdullah Ahmad, former President of the Johor Bahru Municipal Council. Suhaila became the wife of Hussein Onn, Malaysia's third Prime Minister, while Rahah married Abdul Razak Hussein, the second Prime Minister. His only son, Abu Rais, died at the age of 40.

Following Maimun's death in 1968, Noah married Siti Amirah Kusuma. They had a daughter, Nabiha, who died young. Siti Amirah later perished in the Malaysia Airlines Flight 17 tragedy in 2014.

== Death ==
Noah died on 6 September 1991 in Kuala Lumpur, at the age of 94. He was buried at Makam Pahlawan near Masjid Negara, Kuala Lumpur.

== Honours ==
- Malaya
  - Commander of the Order of the Defender of the Realm (PMN) – Tan Sri (1963)
- Malaysia
  - Recipient of the Malaysian Commemorative Medal (Gold) (PPM) (1965)
- Johor
  - Second Class of the Sultan Ibrahim Medal (PIS II) (1947)
  - Knight Commander Order of the Crown of Johor (DPMJ) – Dato' (1955)
  - Knight Grand Commander Order of the Crown of Johor (SPMJ) – Dato' (1960)
  - Knight Grand Companion of the Order of Loyalty of Sultan Ismail of Johor (SSIJ) – Dato' (1977)

=== Foreign honours ===
- Brunei
  - Commander of the Order of Seri Paduka Mahkota Brunei (DPMB) – Dato Paduka (23 September 1960)

== See also ==
- Johore Bahru Timor (federal constituency)

Political offices
First Office created	Speaker of the Dewan Rakyat; 1 September 1959 – 29 February 1964	Succeeded by Syed Esa Alwee
Preceded by Syed Sheh Hassan Barakbah	President of the Dewan Negara; 24 February 1969 – 28 July 1970	Succeeded by Abdul Hamid Khan
