= Fatimah Abdul Majid =

Malaysian politician

Yang Berbahagia Datuk Fatimah Abdul Majid PJN
- فاطمه عبدالمجيد

Member of the Johor State Legislative Assembly for Plentong
- In office 23 November 1959 – 25 April 1964
- Preceded by: Mohamed Noah Omar (Alliance–UMNO)
- Majority: 2,320 (1959)

Faction represented in Dewan Rakyat
- 1964-1978: Barisan Nasional

Personal details
- Born: Fatimah Abdul Majid; 1919 British Malaya
- Died: 12 April 2013 (aged 93–94) National Heart Institute, Kuala Lumpur, Malaysia
- Party: United Malays National Organisation (UMNO)
- Spouse: Sheikh Abu Bakar Yahya
- Occupation: Politician

Datuk Fatimah binti Abdul Majid was one of the founders of the establishment and fight another UMNO since 1946. She and other members of the campaign day and night in the interior of a bike ride, boat and on foot to meet people to find support and influence.

In 1959 she won Plentong by-election and was elected as the first woman to be a member of the Johor State Legislative Assembly. Malaysia's 1964 general election she won and became the first woman elected to the Johor state of Malaysia Parliament. The next she was winning until the 1978 Malaysian general election.

She founded and established the Territorial Army Women's team in 1964. While the country is facing tough scenario the Indonesia-Malaysia confrontation.

On 27 November 2008 she was awarded the Panglima Jasa Negara (PJN) which carries the title Datuk by the Yang di-Pertuan Agong, Sultan Mizan Zainal Abidin at Istana Negara. She died on 12 April 2013 at the National Heart Institute (IJN) due to old age.

== Honours ==
=== Honours of Malaysia ===
- Malaysia
  - Commander of the Order of Meritorious Service (PJN) – Datuk (2008)

== Election results ==
Johor State Legislative Assembly
Year	Constituency	Candidate	Votes	Pct	Opponent(s)	Votes	Pct	Ballots cast	Majority	Turnout
1959	Plentong	Fatimah Abdul Majid (UMNO)	12,600	67.47%	Mat Zain (SF)	5,343	NA	NA	2,320	NA

Parliament of Malaysia
Year	Constituency	Candidate	Votes	Pct	Opponent(s)	Votes	Pct	Ballots cast	Majority	Turnout
1964	P100 Johore Bahru Timor, Johor	Fatimah Abdul Majid (UMNO)	6,901	30.68%	Tan Ah Ngoh (SF)	4,805	28.61%	18,676	7,257	78.46%
1964	P100 Johore Bahru Timor, Johor	Fatimah Abdul Majid (UMNO)	6,901	30.68%	Mohamed Noor Jettey (PAP)	733	3.92%	18,676	7,257	78.46%
1969	P094 Batu Pahat Dalam, Johor	Fatimah Abdul Majid (UMNO)	15,979	75.94%	Sakroni Ahmad (GERAKAN)	5,062	24.06%	21,041	10,917	70.19%
1974	P110 Semerah, Johor	Fatimah Abdul Majid (UMNO)	16,030	78.56%	Abdul Hadi Mohamed Yassin (Independent)	4,374	21.44%	20,404	11,656	70.50%
