= 2019 Sandakan by-election =

2019 Sandakan, Malaysia by election

- 11 May 2019

P186 Sandakan seat in the Dewan Rakyat
	DAP	PBS	IND
Candidate	Vivian Wong Shir Yee	Linda Tsen Thau Lin	Hamzah Abdullah
Party	DAP	PBS	Independent
Alliance	PH-WARISAN-UPKO	GBS-SAPP-PPRS
Popular vote	16,012	4,491	788
Percentage	75.02%	21.04%	3.69%
	IND	IND
Candidate	Chia Siew Yung	Sulaiman Abdul Samat
Party	Independent	Independent
Popular vote	178	126
Percentage	0.83%	0.59%
- P186 Sandakan federal constituency border and its corresponding state assembly seats.
MP before election
Wong Tien Fatt (died)
Pakatan Harapan (DAP)
Elected MP
Vivian Wong Shir Yee
Pakatan Harapan (DAP)

The 2019 Sandakan by-election was a by-election held on 11 May 2019 for the Dewan Rakyat seat of Sandakan. It was called following the death of incumbent, Wong Tien Fatt on 28 March 2019. Wong was a 2-term Member of Parliament for Sandakan since 2013. He was a member and Sabah state party chairman (2015-2019) of the Democratic Action Party (DAP), a component party of the Pakatan Harapan (PH) coalition.

Vivian Wong Shir Yee of DAP won the by-election by 16,012 votes out of the 21,595 votes cast with a bigger majority of 11,521 votes despite at a lower turnout rate at 54.44%.

== Background ==
Wong Tien Fatt had died of heart attack on 28 March 2019. Causing the Sandakan seat vacant and a by-election was called. The Election Commission (EC) had set the polling day for 11 May 2019. Early voting was held on 7 May 2019 and Nomination Day on 27 April 2019.

The electoral roll last updated on March 28 with a total of 40,131 voters was used. Of that figure, 39,856 are regular voters, 270 qualify as early voters and five voters who live abroad and qualify as absentee voters.

Sandakan's registered voters are 49% Chinese, 44% Muslim-Bumiputra, 6% non-Muslim Bumiputra, and 1% Indian and others.

== Nominations ==
On 25 April 2019, Sabah Chief Minister Shafie Apdal announced that Sabah DAP's Vivian Wong Shir Yee, the daughter of the late incumbent, as the candidate for the alliance of Pakatan Harapan (PH), Sabah Heritage Party (WARISAN) and United Pasokmomogun Kadazandusun Murut Organisation (UPKO; later renamed United Progressive Kinabalu Organisation and now component party of PH) for the by-election. On 26 April, Shafie Apdal said that the alliance would use DAP's logo for the by-election as DAP won by a vast majority using their logo in the 14th General Elections (GE14).

United Sabah Party or Parti Bersatu Sabah (PBS); of the United Alliance or Gabungan Bersatu Sabah (GBS; later rebranded as Gabungan Rakyat Sabah or Sabah People's Coalition; GRS) had earlier mulls over their decision fielding a candidate. On 22 April 2019, the PBS finally announced their decision to contest the by-election. On 26 April, former Batu Sapi MP, Linda Tsen Thau Lin was announced as the PBS candidate. PBS would also use its own logo as GBS coalition is not registered while it had quit Barisan Nasional (BN) after GE14.

Homeland Solidarity Party or Parti Solidariti Tanah Airku (STAR); one of PBS's two allies beside United Sabah People's Party (PBRS) within GBS alliance had earlier announced its intention to field economist Jenny Liew Wean Chee, 50, who is its Tanjung Papat division chief to contest the Sandakan by-election. Somehow STAR had later retracted earlier decision to contest in the by-election in order to support their GBS counterpart and ally, PBS instead.

Sabah Progressive Party (SAPP) president Yong Teck Lee on 25 April had conveyed their backing for the party's former foe, PBS to its president Maximus Ongkili in the by-election; for the interest of Sabah rights.

Sabah Barisan Nasional (BN) and United Malays National Organisation (UMNO) chief Bung Mokhtar Radin said Sabah BN or UMNO would not contest the by-election but would support a single candidate from the Opposition front. There was speculation that Malaysian Chinese Association (MCA) might contest the by-election and Batu Sapi MCA Division Chief, Chew Kok Wah was touted as the candidate. On 21 April 2019, BN announced their intention to contest the by-election and candidate would likely come from the MCA or a direct member. On 22 April 2019, BN acting chairman, Mohamad Hasan made the final decision for BN to not contest the by-election.

Sabah Native Co-operation Party (Anak Negeri) intended to contest in the by-election since BN opted out of it and wished BN would support them instead. However the party did not contest.

Liberal Democratic Party (LDP), of which previous candidate Lim Ming Hoo contested the seat under BN ticket in the last GE14, announced that they would not contest this by-election. They also had earlier denied they had met their previous BN coalition partner, UMNO, and declared they would not work with them in the by-election.

Another former BN component; Parti Gerakan Rakyat Malaysia (Gerakan) cancelled their plan to contest by fielding the ex-Sabah deputy chief minister, Raymond Tan Shu Kiah, for the by-election after he resigned abruptly from the party. He joined WARISAN later.

The Sabah Pan-Malaysian Islamic Party (PAS) announced on 2 April that they were ready to field a candidate in the by-election and Sabah PAS commissioner Mohd Aminuddin Aling said the decision would be confirmed in a meeting later on. On 17 April 2019, PAS announced that they would not contest the seat and would support a candidate from the Opposition.

United Sabah National Organisation (USNO) also declared they would not contest and would support the PBS candidate in the by-election.

Businessman and former oil palm company manager Chia Siew Yung, 46, announced he would be contesting in the by-election as an independent. Other than Chia, at least two other independents, ex-Sabah National Trust Party (AMANAH) chairman / ex-Sabah PAS commissioner Hamzah Abdullah and youth activist Jufazli Shi Ahmad, also stated their wish to contest for the by-election. Sulaiman Abdul Samat, 36, the ex-Assistant Administrator of DAP Sandakan Parliament Service Centre, had also intended to join the by-election.

On 27 April Nomination Day, Vivian Wong of DAP and Linda Tsen of PBS along with 3 independents, Chia Siew Yung (key), Hamzah Abdullah (tree) and Sulaiman Abdul Samat (chair) filed their nomination papers to set for a five-cornered fight in the by-election.

== Controversies and issues ==
Finance Minister, Lim Guan Eng announced a RM2.28 billion development project to be held in Sandakan. This was widely criticised by social media for launching a project when the by-election was near.

DAP candidate Vivian Wong was criticised for cleaning a Muslim cemetery. Social media users cited that it was a political gimmick to gain Muslim Bumiputera votes.

PBS put up a controversial banner that claimed Finance Minister Lim Guan Eng had threatened Sandakan voters by saying he could not solve the issue of insufficient parking lots at the Sandakan Hospital in the event that DAP's candidate Vivian Wong lost in this by-election. DAP dismissed the claim and explained that Lim's remark was taken out of context. The banner was subsequently removed by the Election Commission.

=== Alleged leaked sex tape ===
On 12 June 2019, it was reported that Azmin Ali, a former Minister of Economic Affairs, was filmed in Sandakan, whilst campaigning for PH's candidate, being intimate with another man, his own political aide Haziq Abdul Aziz, in a video circulating on social media. Azmin denied his involvement. Muhammad Haziq Abdul Aziz later confirmed his involvement in the act with the minister and urged authorities to investigate him. Until 16 July 2019, nine people had been arrested by Royal Malaysia Police in the investigation regarding their involvement in making and distribution of the lewd video, including Haziq who had admitted he was the person in the video, and Farhash Wafa Salvador Rizal Mubarak who is PKR Perak state chairman and is also Anwar Ibrahim's political secretary. This video was oftentimes being viewed as the beginning of the end of Azmin Ali's political ambition.

== Results ==
Malaysian general by-election, 2019: Sandakan Upon the death of the incumbent, Wong Tien Fatt
Party	Candidate	Votes	%	∆%
DAP	Vivian Wong Shir Yee^{1}	16,012	74.15	+6.18
PBS	Linda Tsen Thau Lin	4,491	20.80	-11.23
Independent	Hamza A. Abdullah @ Hamzah	788	3.65	+3.65
Independent	Chia Siew Yung	178	0.82	+0.82
Independent	Sulaiman Abdul Samat	126	0.58	+0.58
Total valid votes		21,595	100.00	
Total rejected ballots		234		
Unreturned ballots		18		
Turnout		21,847	54.44	
Registered electors		40,131		
Majority		11,521		
DAP hold		Swing		+8.71
Source(s): 1. "Keputusan Pilihan Raya Kecil P.186 Sandakan". Suruhanjaya Pilihan Raya Malaysia. 2019-05-11. Archived from the original on 2019-05-23.

Note: ^{1}Vivian Wong Shir Yee was a candidate of the Democratic Action Party (DAP), who had contested under the DAP banner instead of the PH banner.

=== Polling District result ===
DAP won all the polling districts and post votes. PBS won the early votes with a razor thin majority.

== Previous result ==
Malaysian general election, 2018: Sandakan
Party	Candidate	Votes	%	∆%
DAP	Wong Tien Fatt	19,094	67.97	+ 15.98
BN	Lim Ming Hoo	8,996	32.03	15.98
Total valid votes		28,090	100.00	
Total rejected ballots		502		
Unreturned ballots		76		
Turnout		28,668	72.07	
Registered electors		39,777		
Majority		10,098	35.95	
DAP hold		Swing		+15.98
Source(s) "His Majesty's Government Gazette - Notice of Contested Election, Parliament for the State of Sabah [P.U. (B) 246/2018]" (PDF). Attorney General's Chambers of Malaysia. 3 May 2018. "Federal Government Gazette - Results of Contested Election and Statements of the Poll after the Official Addition of Votes, Parliamentary Constituencies for the State of Sabah [P.U. (B) 320/2018]" (PDF). Attorney General's Chambers of Malaysia. 28 May 2018. Archived from the original (PDF) on December 29, 2019.
