= 2010 Batu Sapi by-election =

Election in Malaysia

- 4 November 2010

Batu Sapi seat in the Dewan Rakyat
	BN	PKR	SAPP
Candidate	Tsen Thau Lin	Umsery @ Ansari Abdullah	Yong Teck Lee
Party	BN (PBS)	PKR	SAPP
Alliance		PR
Popular vote	9,773	3,414	2,031
Percentage	64.22%	22.43%	13.35%
MP before election
Edmund Chong Ket Wah
BN (PBS)
Elected MP
Tsen Thau Lin
BN (PBS)

The 2010 Batu Sapi by-election in the Malaysian state of Sabah was held on 4 November 2010. The nomination of candidates was done on 26 October 2010. The Batu Sapi parliamentary seat fell vacant when its Member of Parliament; Datuk Edmund Chong Ket Wah of United Sabah Party or Parti Bersatu Sabah (PBS), was killed after his 750cc motorcycle accident in Sabah on 9 October 2010. Previously PBS won the seat during the 2008 General Election by a 3,708-vote majority over Independent candidate Chung Kwong Wing. A total 25,720 registered voters eligible to vote in this by-election. The electorate is made of 50.61% Bumiputera, 40.22% Chinese and 3% others.

The by-election was held on the same day as the 2010 Galas by-election.

== Results ==
Malaysian general by-election, 4 November 2010: Batu Sapi Upon the death of incumbent, Chong Ket Wah
Party	Candidate	Votes	%	∆%
BN	Tsen Thau Lin	9,773	64.22	
PKR	Umsery @ Ansari Abdullah	3,414	22.43	
SAPP	Yong Teck Lee	2,031	13.35	
Total valid votes		15,218	100.00	
Total rejected ballots		372		
Unreturned ballots		23		
Turnout		15,613	61.03	
Registered electors		25,582		
Majority		6,359		
BN hold		Swing		
Source(s) "Pilihan Raya Kecil P.185 Batu Sapi". Election Commission of Malaysia. Archived from the original on 2018-09-19.
