= Bonting Island =

Island in Malaysia

- Interactive map of Bonting Island

Geography
- Coordinates: 6°6′57.96″N 118°0′3.24″E

Administration
- Malaysia
- State: Sabah
- Division: Sandakan
- District: Sandakan

Bonting Island (Malay: Pulau Bonting) is an island located on Sandakan in Sabah, Malaysia.

== See also ==
- List of islands of Malaysia
