= 2010 Galas by-election =

Election in Malaysia

- 4 November 2010

Galas seat in the Kelantan State Legislative Assembly
	BN	PAS
Candidate	Abdul Aziz Yusoff	Zulkefli Mohamed
Party	BN (UMNO)	PAS
Alliance		PR
Popular vote	5,324	4,134
Percentage	56.29%	43.71%
Galas assemblyman before election
Che Hashim Sulaiman
PAS
Elected Galas assemblyman
Abdul Aziz Yusoff
BN (UMNO)

The Galas by-election was an election for the Galas seat in the Kelantan state legislative assembly to replace the incumbent, who died in office. Polling was held on 4 November 2010. Nominations were held on 26 October 2010. The Galas state seat fell vacant following the death of assemblyman Che Hashim Sulaiman on 27 September due to cancer. Previously, PAS won the seat during the 2008 General Election by a 646-vote majority over Barisan Nasional's Saufi Deraman. A total 11,553 registered voters were eligible to vote in this by-election, including 127 postal voters. The electorate is made of 61.63% Malays, 20.08% Chinese, 16.37% Orang Asli, 1.6% Indians, 0.09% others. Barisan Nasional's candidate won the by-election.

The by-election was held on the same day as the 2010 Batu Sapi by-election.

== Results ==
Kelantan state by-election, 4 November 2010: Galas The by-election was called due to the death of incumbent, Che Hashim Sulaiman.
Party	Candidate	Votes	%	∆%
BN	Abdul Aziz Yusoff	5,324	56.29	▲10.25
PAS	Zulkefli Mohamed	4,134	43.71	▼10.25
Total valid votes		9,458	100.00	
Total rejected ballots		132		
Unreturned ballots		3		
Turnout		9,593	83.03	
Registered electors		11,553		
Majority		1,190	12.58	
BN gain from PAS		Swing		?
Source(s) "Pilihan Raya Kecil N.45 Galas". Election Commission of Malaysia. Archived from the original on 2018-09-19.
