= Khairul Firdaus Akbar Khan =

Malaysian politician (born 1983)

Yang Berhormat Datuk Khairul Firdaus Akbar Khan PGDK ASDK ADK MP
- خير الفردوس أكبر خان

Deputy Minister of Human Resources
- Incumbent
- Assumed office 17 December 2025
- Monarch: Ibrahim Iskandar
- Prime Minister: Anwar Ibrahim
- Minister: Ramanan Ramakrishnan
- Preceded by: Abdul Rahman Mohamad
- Constituency: Batu Sapi

Deputy Minister of Tourism, Arts and Culture
- In office 10 December 2022 – 17 December 2025
- Monarchs: Abdullah (2022–2024); Ibrahim Iskandar (since 2024)
- Prime Minister: Anwar Ibrahim
- Minister: Tiong King Sing
- Preceded by: Edmund Santhara Kumar Ramanaidu
- Succeeded by: Chiew Choon Man
- Constituency: Batu Sapi

Member of the Malaysian Parliament for Batu Sapi
- Incumbent
- Assumed office 19 November 2022
- Preceded by: Liew Vui Keong (WARISAN)
- Majority: 4,821 (2022)

Personal details
- Born: Khairul Firdaus bin Akbar Khan; 26 July 1983 (age 43) Kota Kinabalu, Sabah, Malaysia
- Citizenship: Malaysian
- Party: United Malays National Organisation of Sabah (Sabah UMNO) (until 2018); Malaysian United Indigenous Party of Sabah (Sabah BERSATU) (2019–2022)
- Other political affiliations: Barisan Nasional (BN) (until 2018); Pakatan Harapan (PH) (2019–2020); Perikatan Nasional (PN) (2020–2022); Gabungan Rakyat Sabah (GRS) (since 2020)
- Education: Deakin University (BCom)
- Occupation: Politician

Khairul Firdaus bin Akbar Khan (born 26 July 1983) is a Malaysian politician who has served as the Deputy Minister of Tourism, Arts and Culture in the Unity Government administration under Prime Minister Anwar Ibrahim and Minister Tiong King Sing since December 2022 and the Member of Parliament (MP) for Batu Sapi since November 2022. He is a direct member of the Gabungan Rakyat Sabah (GRS) coalition. His proposal of turning Langkawi into a preferred tourism destination for Muslims has been controversial.

== Education ==
He graduated from Deakin University, Melbourne, Australia with a Bachelor of Commerce majoring in Electronics Commerce Management and Human Resource Management.

== Controversies and issues ==
=== Turning Langkawi into a preferred tourism destination for Muslims ===
On 24 June 2024, Khairul Firdaus made a speech in Parliament, proposing and claiming that his ministry would possibly turn and position Langkawi as a preferred tourism destination for Muslims, the adherents of the Islam religion who make up of the religious majority in the state of Kedah and nation of Malaysia. The following day, Member of the Kedah State Executive Council (EXCO) in charge of Tourism, Culture and Entrepreneurship Mohd Salleh Saidin praised the proposal and stressing that it is in line with the plan of the '2025 Kedah Tourism Year'. It was however criticised by Zaid Ibrahim as controversial in the non-Muslim community. On 29 June 2024, Minister Tiong King Sing apologised to Malaysians for the statement by Khairul Firdaus, highlighting that no tourism destinations should be made to satisfy the needs of the followers of a single religion and that inclusivity was the key of cultural tourism strategy that must be upheld.

== Election results ==
Parliament of Malaysia
Year	Constituency	Candidate	Votes	Pct	Opponent(s)	Votes	Pct	Ballots cast	Majority	Turnout
2022	P185 Batu Sapi	Khairul Firdaus Akhbar Khan (Sabah BERSATU)	12,152	44.95%	Liau Fui Fui (DAP)	7,331	27.11%	27,608	4,821	61.57%
2022	P185 Batu Sapi	Khairul Firdaus Akhbar Khan (Sabah BERSATU)	12,152	44.95%	Alias Sani (WARISAN)	7,218	26.70%	27,608	4,821	61.57%
2022	P185 Batu Sapi	Khairul Firdaus Akhbar Khan (Sabah BERSATU)	12,152	44.95%	Boni Yusuf Abdullah @ Narseso P Juanico (PEJUANG)	176	0.65%	27,608	4,821	61.57%
2022	P185 Batu Sapi	Khairul Firdaus Akhbar Khan (Sabah BERSATU)	12,152	44.95%	Othman Ahmad (IND)	160	0.59%	27,608	4,821	61.57%

== Honours ==
=== Honours of Malaysia ===
- Malaysia
  - Recipient of the 17th Yang di-Pertuan Agong Installation Medal
- Sabah
  - Commander of the Order of Kinabalu (PGDK) – Datuk (2025)
  - Companion of the Order of Kinabalu (ASDK) (2022)
  - Member of the Order of Kinabalu (ADK) (2017)
