= Vivian Wong Shir Yee =

Malaysian politician, financial advisor, teacher, activist and volunteer

Yang Berhormat Puan Vivian Wong Shir Yee MP
- 黄诗怡

Member of the Malaysian Parliament for Sandakan
- Incumbent
- Assumed office 11 May 2019
- Preceded by: Stephen Wong Tien Fatt (PH–DAP)
- Majority: 11,521 (2019); 11,031 (2022)

Assistant National Political Education Director of the Democratic Action Party
- Incumbent
- Assumed office 16 March 2025
- Secretary-General: Anthony Loke Siew Fook
- National Political Education Director: Howard Lee Chuan How
- Preceded by: Wong Shu Qi

Personal details
- Born: Vivian Wong Shir Yee; 27 March 1989 (age 37) Sandakan, Sabah, Malaysia
- Citizenship: Malaysian
- Party: Democratic Action Party (DAP) (since 2012)
- Other political affiliations: Pakatan Rakyat (PR) (2012–2015); Pakatan Harapan (PH) (since 2015)
- Spouse: Lu King Chiew (m. 2025)
- Parent(s): Stephen Wong Tien Fatt (father, deceased); Florence Chong Mee Fook (mother)
- Education: INTI College; Murdoch University; University of Malaya
- Occupation: Politician; activist; volunteer
- Profession: Financial advisor; teacher
- Website: Vivian Wong Shir Yee on Facebook

Vivian Wong Shir Yee (simplified Chinese: 黄诗怡; traditional Chinese: 黃詩怡; pinyin: Huáng Shīyí; born 27 March 1989) is a Malaysian politician, financial advisor, teacher, activist and volunteer who has served as the Member of Parliament (MP) for Sandakan since May 2019. She is a member of the Democratic Action Party (DAP), a component party of the Pakatan Harapan (PH) and formerly Pakatan Rakyat (PR) coalitions. She has also served as the Assistant National Political Education Director of DAP since March 2025. She is also the daughter of former State Minister of Health and People's Wellbeing of Sabah, former Sandakan MP and former State Chairman of DAP of Sabah Stephen Wong Tien Fatt.

== Personal life ==
Wong was born and raised in Sandakan, Sabah. She is the youngest child and daughter of Stephen Wong Tien Fatt, the Sandakan MP from 2013 and State Minister of People's Health and Wellbeing of Sabah from 2018 to his death in 2019. During the lantern festival on 12 February 2025, she married Lu King Chiew.

== Education ==
Wong graduated from the INTI College, Subang Jaya with a Diploma of Communication and Media from Subang Jaya in 2010. She also graduated from the Murdoch University, Western Australia with a bachelor's degree in Public Relations in 2013. In addition, she graduated from the University of Malaya, Kuala Lumpur with a Diploma Degree of Early Childhood Education in 2018.

== Political career ==
=== Democratic Action Party and Special Assistant to the State Minister of Health and People's Wellbeing of Sabah ===
Wong has been an active member of DAP alongside her father since 2012 and previously worked as a special assistant to her father as the State Minister of Sabah.

=== Member of Parliament (since 2019) ===
==== 2019 Sandakan by-election ====
In the 2019 Sandakan by-election held after the death in office of her father who was the Sandakan MP due to heart attack, Wong was nominated by PH to contest for the Sandakan federal seat. She won the seat and was elected to the Parliament as the Sandakan MP for the first term after defeating Linda Tsen Thau Lin of the United Sabah Party (PBS) and independent candidates Hamzah Abdullah, Chia Sew Yung and Sulaiman Abdul Samat by a majority of 11,521 votes.

==== 2022 general election ====
In the 2022 general election, Wong was renominated by PH to defend the Sandakan seat. She defended the seat and was reelected as the Sandakan MP for the second term after defeating Alex Thien Ching Qiang of the Heritage Party (WARISAN), Lau Chee Kiong of the Gabungan Rakyat Sabah (GRS) and independent candidates Peter Hu Chang Lik, Sheikh Lokeman and Lita Tan Abdullah by a majority of 11,031 votes.

== Other careers ==
She is a financial adviser in Kuala Lumpur, a teacher at the International Korean School of Malaysia in Cyberjaya, an activist and a volunteer for welfare programmes in Indonesia, Cambodia and other nations.

== Election results ==
Parliament of Malaysia
Year	Constituency	Candidate	Votes	Pct	Opponent(s)	Votes	Pct	Ballots cast	Majority	Turnout
2019	P186 Sandakan	Vivian Wong Shir Yee (DAP)	16,012	74.15%	Linda Tsen Thau Lin (PBS)	4,491	20.80%	21,595	11,521	54.44%
2019	P186 Sandakan	Vivian Wong Shir Yee (DAP)	16,012	74.15%	Hamzah Abdullah (IND)	788	3.65%	21,595	11,521	54.44%
2019	P186 Sandakan	Vivian Wong Shir Yee (DAP)	16,012	74.15%	Chia Siew Yung (IND)	178	0.82%	21,595	11,521	54.44%
2019	P186 Sandakan	Vivian Wong Shir Yee (DAP)	16,012	74.15%	Sulaiman Abdul Samat (IND)	126	0.58%	21,595	11,521	54.44%
2022	P186 Sandakan	Vivian Wong Shir Yee (DAP)	16,673	53.92%	Alex Thien Ching Qiang (WARISAN)	5,642	18.25%	31,533	11,031	55.67%
2022	P186 Sandakan	Vivian Wong Shir Yee (DAP)	16,673	53.92%	Lau Chee Keong @ Thomas Lau (SAPP)	5,054	16.35%	31,533	11,031	55.67%
2022	P186 Sandakan	Vivian Wong Shir Yee (DAP)	16,673	53.92%	Peter Hu Chang Lik @ Hii Chang Lik (IND)	2,342	7.57%	31,533	11,031	55.67%
2022	P186 Sandakan	Vivian Wong Shir Yee (DAP)	16,673	53.92%	Sheikh Lokeman (IND)	962	3.11%	31,533	11,031	55.67%
2022	P186 Sandakan	Vivian Wong Shir Yee (DAP)	16,673	53.92%	Lita Tan Abdullah (IND)	246	0.80%	31,533	11,031	55.67%

Sabah State Legislative Assembly
Year	Constituency	Candidate	Votes	Pct	Opponent(s)	Votes	Pct	Ballots cast	Majority	Turnout
2025	N55 Elopura	Vivian Wong Shir Yee (DAP)			Calvin Chong Ket Kiun (WARISAN)					
2025	N55 Elopura	Vivian Wong Shir Yee (DAP)			Mohd Firdaus Silvester Abdullah (Gerakan)					
2025	N55 Elopura	Vivian Wong Shir Yee (DAP)			Liau Fui Fui (KDM)					
2025	N55 Elopura	Vivian Wong Shir Yee (DAP)			Wong Hon Kong (PPRS)					
2025	N55 Elopura	Vivian Wong Shir Yee (DAP)			Jeffrey Chung Cheong Yung (IMPIAN)					
2025	N55 Elopura	Vivian Wong Shir Yee (DAP)			Lita Tan Abdullah (IND)					

== Honours ==
=== Honours of Malaysia ===
- Malaysia
  - Recipient of the 17th Yang di-Pertuan Agong Installation Medal
