= Kinabatangan District =

Kinabatangan District Daerah Kinabatangan
- District
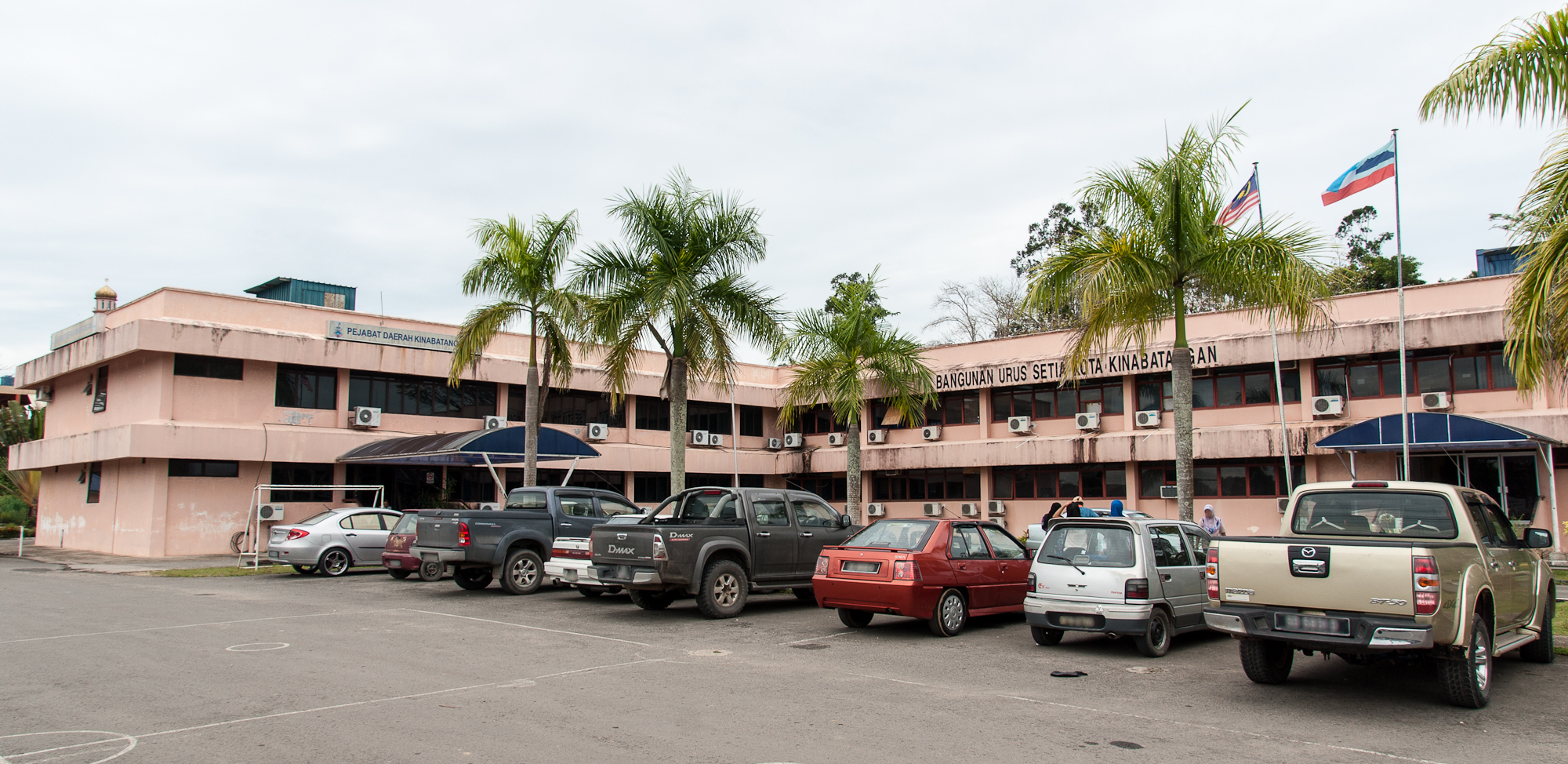
- Kinabatangan District Council office.

- Seal

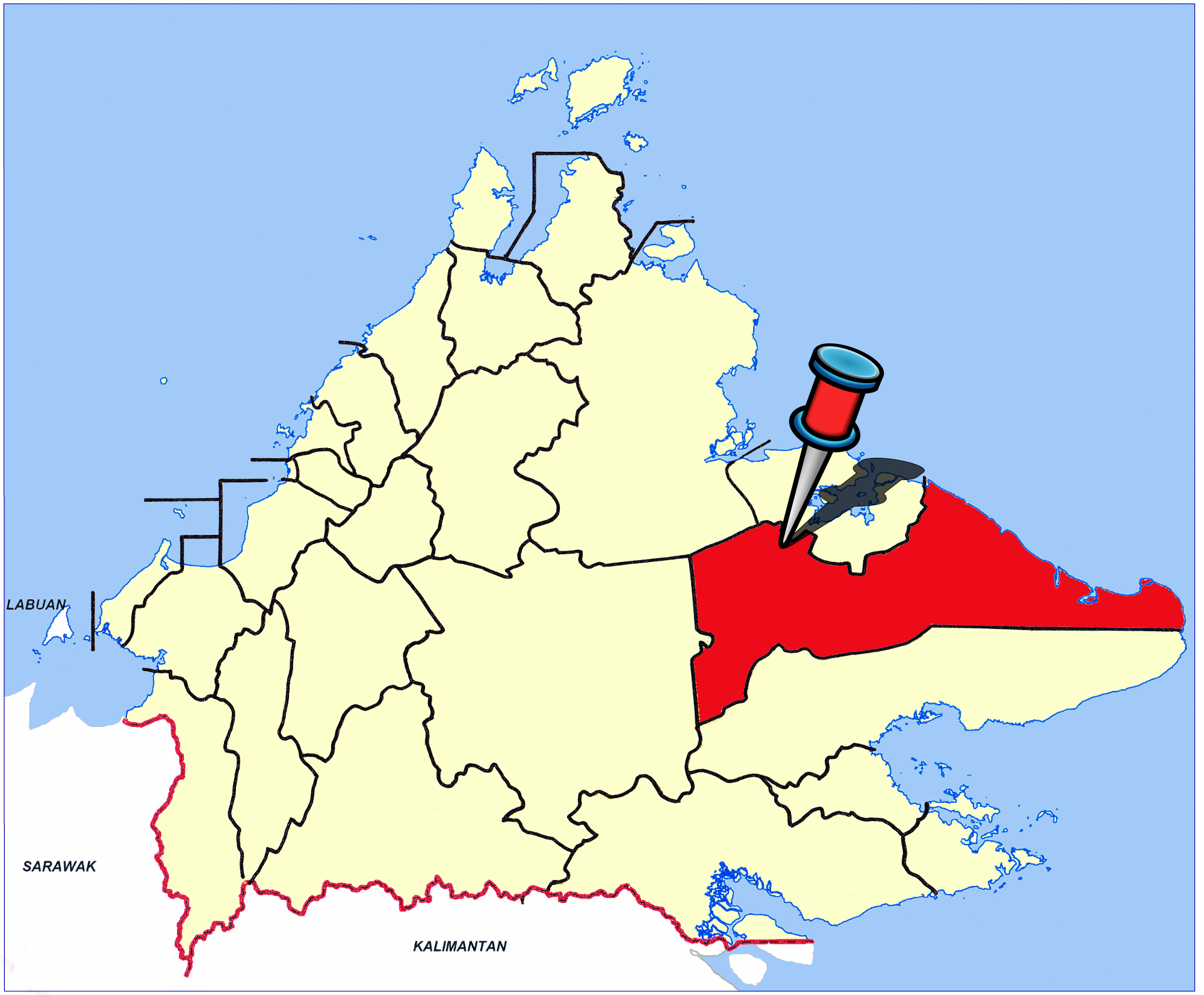
- Coordinates: 5°25′0″N 117°35′0″E
- Country: Malaysia
- State: Sabah
- Division: Sandakan
- Capital: Kinabatangan

Government
  - District Officer: Willey Lampaki

Area
  - Total: 8,000 km^{2} (3,100 sq mi)

Population (2010)
  - Total: 146,987
- Website: mdkinabatangan.sbh.gov.my pdkinabatangan.sbh.gov.my

Map of Kinabatangan District

The Kinabatangan District (Malay: Daerah Kinabatangan) is an administrative district in the Malaysian state of Sabah, part of the Sandakan Division which includes the districts of Beluran, Kinabatangan, Sandakan, Telupid and Tongod. The capital of the district is in Kinabatangan Town.

== Etymology ==
With the early Chinese traders' settlement around the river mouth area, the name Kina Batañgan was used by the indigenous people of the area for the river, with the word Kina being a reference by the indigenous Dusun for the Chinese people.

Some sources stated that Kinabatangan was already used by the locals as recorded in the books of French authors in 1782 and 1837, long before the arrival of Chinese immigrants to the area.

== History ==
Bruneian records record the marriage of Sultan Ahmad, Sultan Muhammad's brother, to Princess Kinabatangan who is the sister of Ong Sum Ping, who ruled 1408–1426.

The modern district are established during the administration of the North Borneo Chartered Company. At the beginning, the district office is known as the Lamag District Office which established in 1905 by the British colonial authorities whose administrative centre is located in Lamag. The office however only provide services in the affairs of the administration and court. The office later known as Kinabatangan District Office where it is now provide a wider range of services including in district development planning, socio-economics, infrastructure facilities and human capital.

== Geography ==
Kinabatangan is located in the western Sabah, and share four other Sabahan district:

- Tongod to the west
- Lahad Datu to the south
- Beluran to the northwest
- Sandakan to the north

The nearby Kinabatangan River is an area along which small fragments of lowland riverine rainforest remains which is the Kinabatangan Wildlife Sanctuary. The area is wet and humid and the swampy lowlands are home to particularly high densities of Borneo's more emblematic birds and mammals, such as hornbills, Borneo elephants, and the endemic proboscis monkey. Scattered in the area are limestone outcrops, many with caves that harbour large nesting colonies of echolocating swiftlets, as well as endemic limestone-inhabiting flora and fauna, such as Diplommatinidae snails. The largest and best known of these limestone hills is Gomantong Caves. Kinabatangan is also the large area under Ramsar site (estuary) with 78,000 hectares both combined rivers that as Kinabatangan and Segama was gazetted in 2008 as 'Kinabatangan-Segama Wetlands Ramsar site'. The recognition is significant, as the wetlands comprise rarely found coastal mangrove swamps and peat jungles.

== Demographics ==
According to the last census in 2010, the population of the district is estimated to be around 146,987 inhabitants. As in other districts of Sabah, there are a significant number of illegal immigrants from the nearby southern Philippines, mainly from the Sulu Archipelago and Mindanao of whom are not included in the population statistics.

== Gallery ==
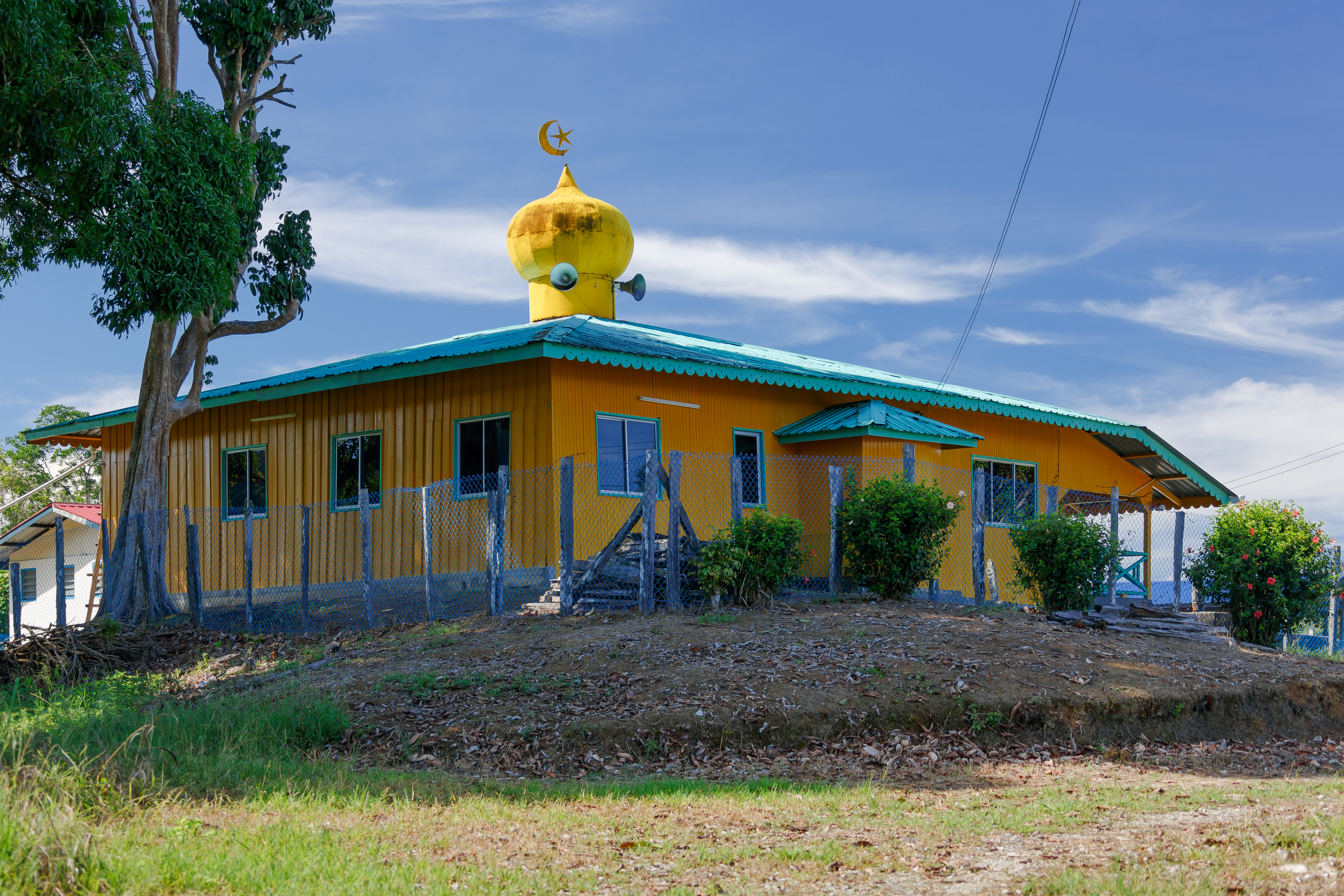
Nurul Hikmah Mosque

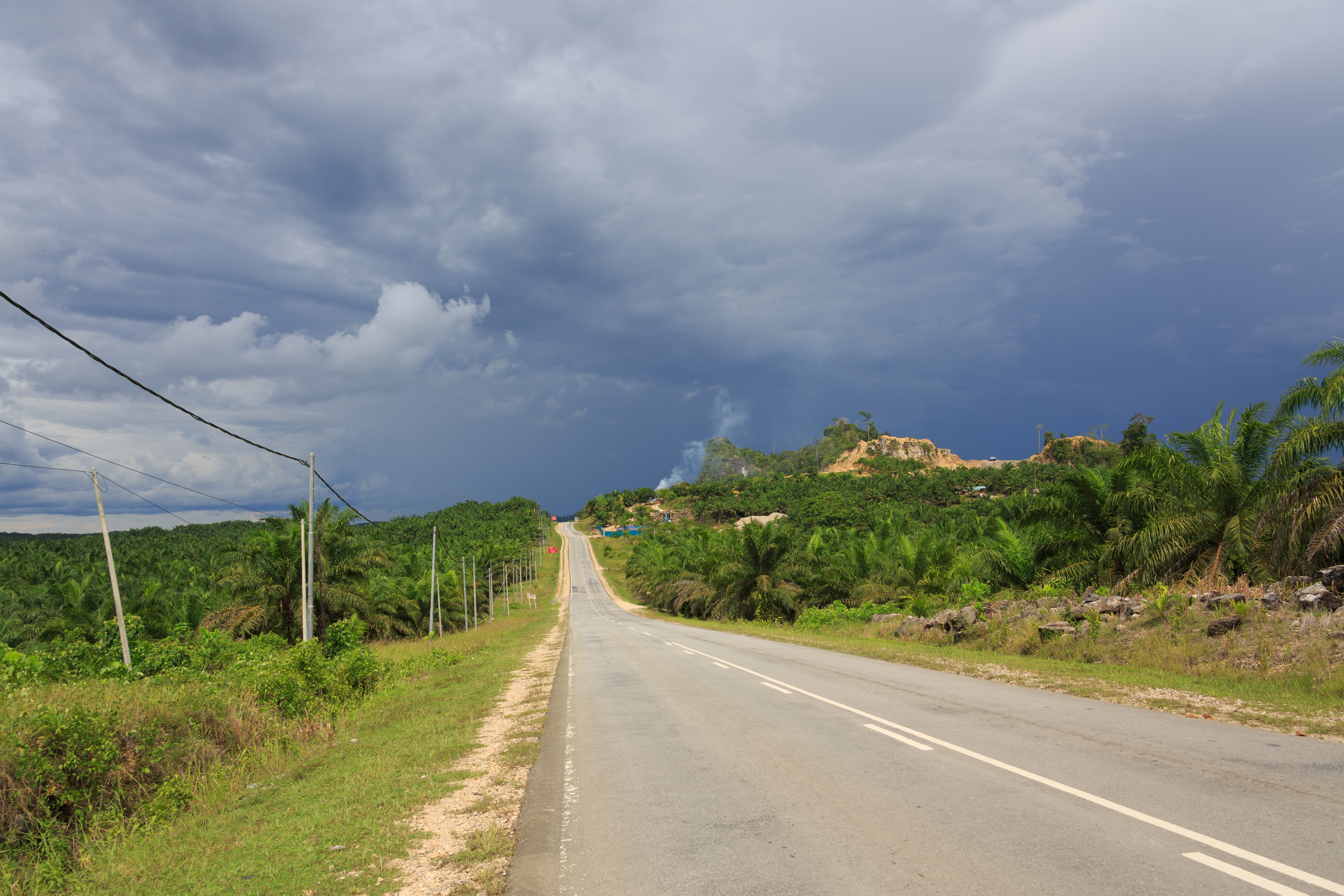
Sukau Road

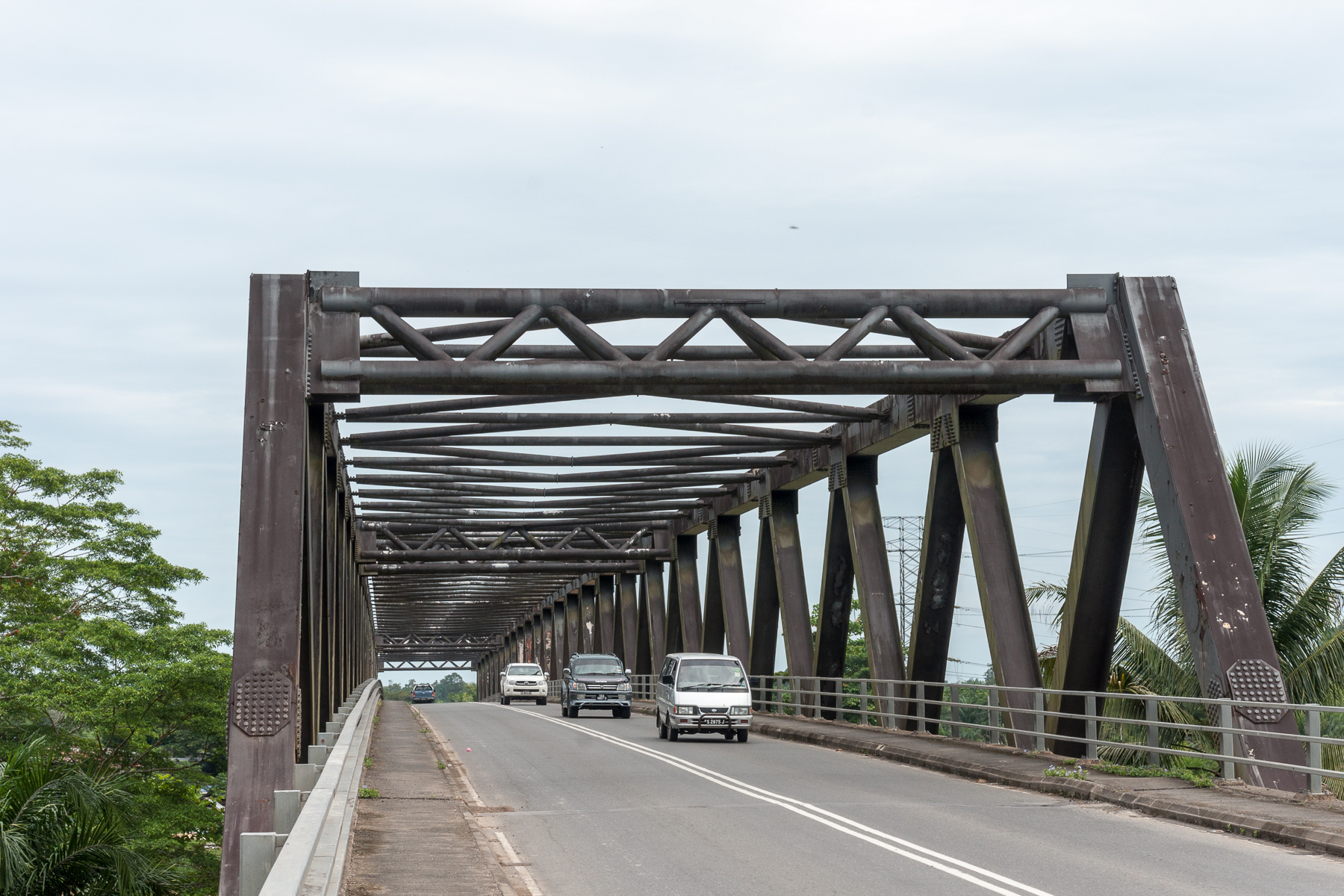
Kinabatangan Bridge

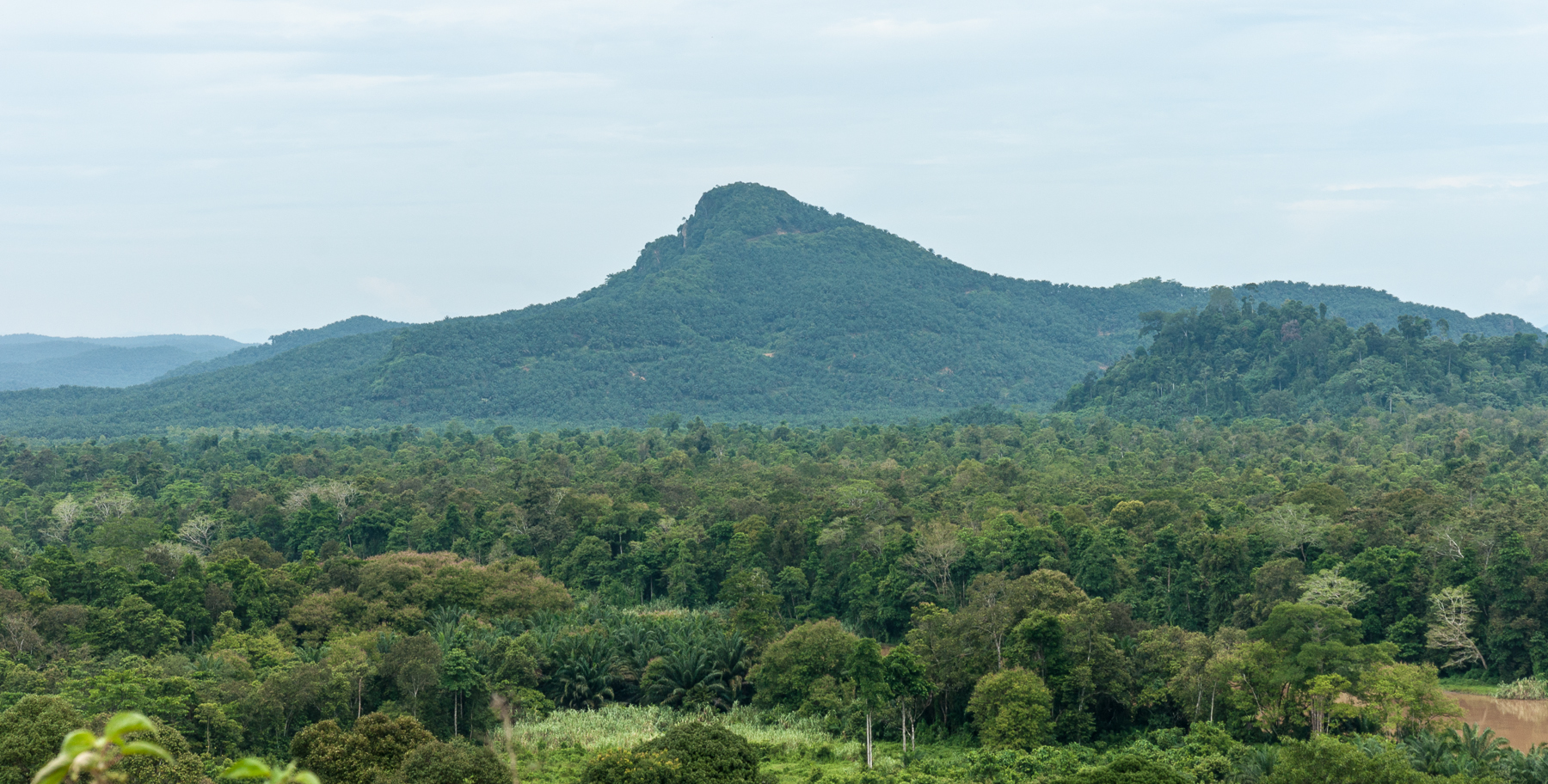
Batu Putih

== See also ==
- Districts of Malaysia
