= Stephen Wong Tien Fatt =

Malaysian politician (1954–2019)

Yang Berbahagia Datuk Stephen Wong Tien Fatt PGDK
- 黄天发
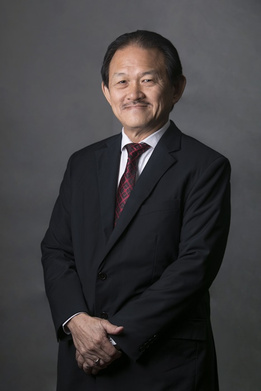

Member of the Malaysian Parliament for Sandakan
- In office 5 May 2013 – 28 March 2019
- Preceded by: Liew Vui Keong (BN–LDP)
- Succeeded by: Vivian Wong Shir Yee (PH–DAP)
- Majority: 1,088 (2013); 10,098 (2018)

State Chairman of the Democratic Action Party of Sabah
- In office 29 November 2015 – 28 March 2019
- National Chairman: Tan Kok Wai
- Secretary-General: Lim Guan Eng
- Preceded by: Jimmy Wong Sze Phin
- Succeeded by: Frankie Poon Ming Fung

State Minister of People's Health and Wellbeing of Sabah
- In office 16 May 2018 – 28 March 2019
- Governor: Juhar Mahiruddin
- Chief Minister: Shafie Apdal
- Succeeded by: Frankie Poon Ming Fung
- Constituency: Nominated MLA

Nominated Member of the Sabah State Legislative Assembly
- In office 16 May 2018 – 28 March 2019
- Governor: Juhar Mahiruddin
- Chief Minister: Shafie Apdal

Personal details
- Born: Wong Tien Fatt @ Wong Nyuk Foh; 2 October 1954 Sandakan, Crown Colony of North Borneo (now Sabah, Malaysia)
- Died: 28 March 2019 (aged 64) Queen Elizabeth Hospital, Kota Kinabalu, Sabah, Malaysia
- Resting place: Sandakan Christian Burial Ground, along Mile 12 off Labuk Road, Sandakan, Sabah, Malaysia
- Citizenship: Malaysian
- Party: Democratic Action Party (DAP) (2012–2019)
- Other political affiliations: Pakatan Rakyat (PR) (2012–2015); Pakatan Harapan (PH) (2015–2019)
- Spouse: Florence Chong Mee Fook
- Children: 4 (including Vivian Wong Shir Yee)
- Occupation: Politician

Stephen Wong Tien Fatt (simplified Chinese: 黄天发; traditional Chinese: 黃天發; pinyin: Huáng Tiānfā; Pha̍k-fa-sṳ: Vòng Thiên-fat; 2 October 1954 – 28 March 2019) was a Malaysian politician who served as the Member of Parliament (MP) for Sandakan from May 2013 to his death in March 2019, State Minister of People's Health and Wellbeing of Sabah and Nominated Member of the Sabah State Legislative Assembly from May 2018 to his death in March 2019. He was a member of the Democratic Action Party (DAP), a component party of the Pakatan Harapan (PH) and formerly Pakatan Rakyat (PR) coalitions. He also served as the State Chairman of DAP of Sabah from November 2015 to his death in March 2019. He was also the father of Sandakan MP Vivian Wong Shir Yee.

== Political career ==
=== 2013 general election ===
In the 2013 election, Wong faced Liew Vui Keong of the Liberal Democratic Party (LDP) and subsequently won the parliamentary seat of Sandakan.

=== 2018 general election ===
In the 2018 election, was fielded by the DAP again to contest in Sandakan, facing a new candidate Lim Ming Hoo from the LDP. He won the election with a large majority.

== Controversies and issues ==
=== Criticism of ESSCOM ===
In 2015, Wong criticised the Eastern Sabah Security Command (ESSCOM) for its costly formation despite recurring kidnapping cases and expressed disappointment towards the "irresponsible and arrogant attitude by [sic] the government leaders as it seems as they are trying to avoid the blame from public". A year before, Wong had urged the government to implement the re-issuance of identity cards in Sabah in response to the many immigrants from the southern Philippines.

=== Acceptance of Sabah State Awards and Datukship ===
In 2018, Wong accepted the Sabah State Award of Panglima Gemilang Darjah Kinabalu (PGDK) (which carries the title of "Datuk") in accordance with the Yang di-Pertua Sabah Tun Juhar Mahiruddin's 65th birthday; this was in opposition to the DAP's Central Executive Committee policy of disallowing the acceptance of awards and titles by elected representatives and local councillors during their period of active political service. Wong was neither apologetic to the party leadership nor willing to return the award.

== Election results ==
Parliament of Malaysia
Year	Constituency	Candidate	Votes	Pct	Opponent(s)	Votes	Pct	Ballots cast	Majority	Turnout%
2013	P186 Sandakan	Wong Tien Fatt (DAP)	14,226	51.99%	Liew Vui Keong (LDP)	13,138	48.01%	27,923	1,088	75.35%
2018	P186 Sandakan	Wong Tien Fatt (DAP)	19,094	67.97%	Lim Ming Hoo (LDP)	8,996	32.03%	28,668	10,098	72.07%

== Death ==
Wong died at the Queen Elizabeth Hospital in Kota Kinabalu, Sabah, Malaysia on 28 March 2019 due to a heart attack during a morning hike on the same day. His body was flown back to his hometown of Sandakan to be laid to rest.

His death triggered the 2019 Sandakan by-election on 11 May. His former seat was successfully defended by his daughter and DAP candidate Vivian Wong Shir Yee by a majority of 11,521 votes.

== Honours ==
=== Malaysia ===
- Sabah
  - Commander of the Order of Kinabalu (PGDK) – Datuk (2018)
