= Kinabatangan =

Kinabatangan Town Pekan Kinabatangan
- District Capital
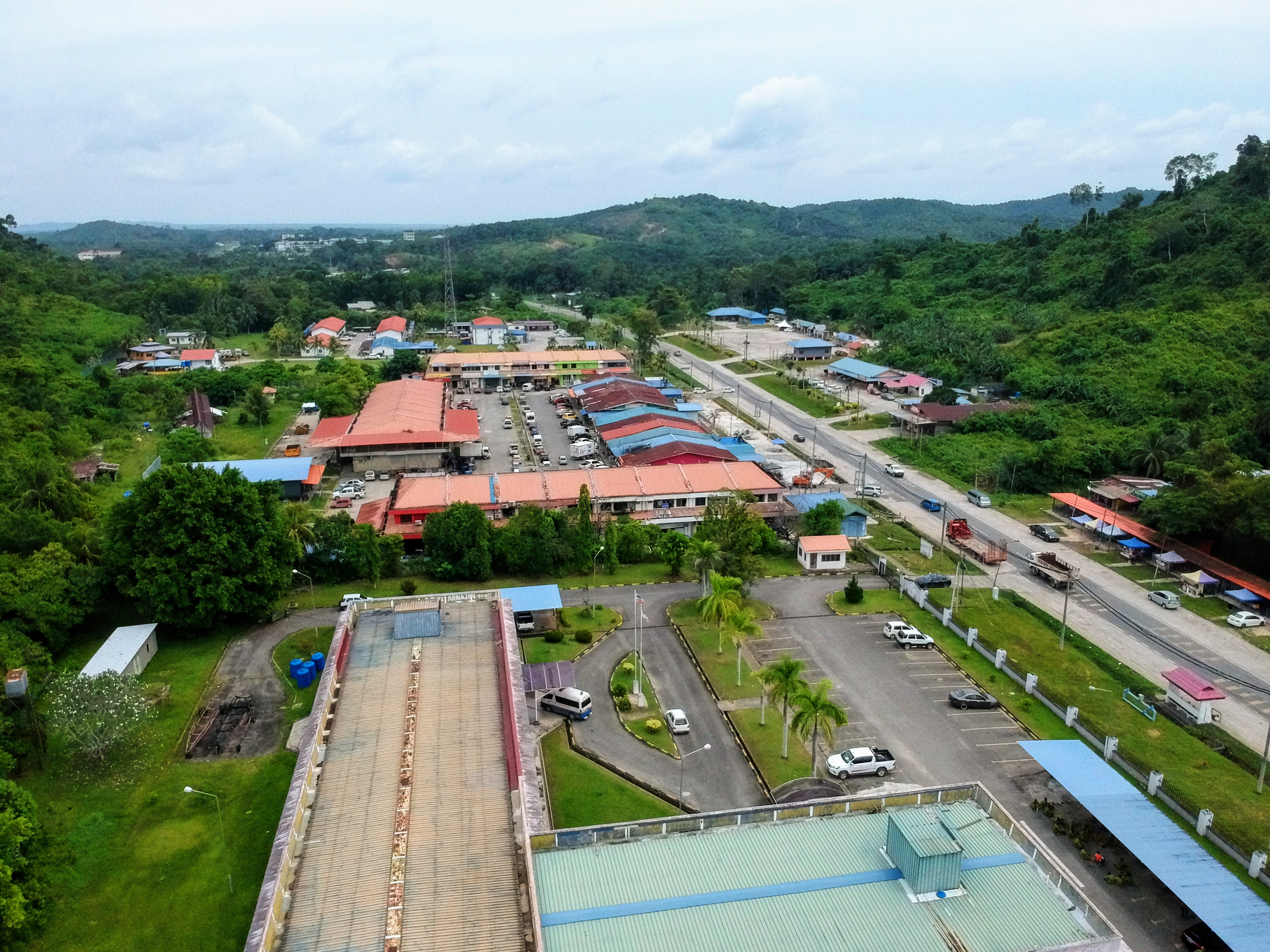

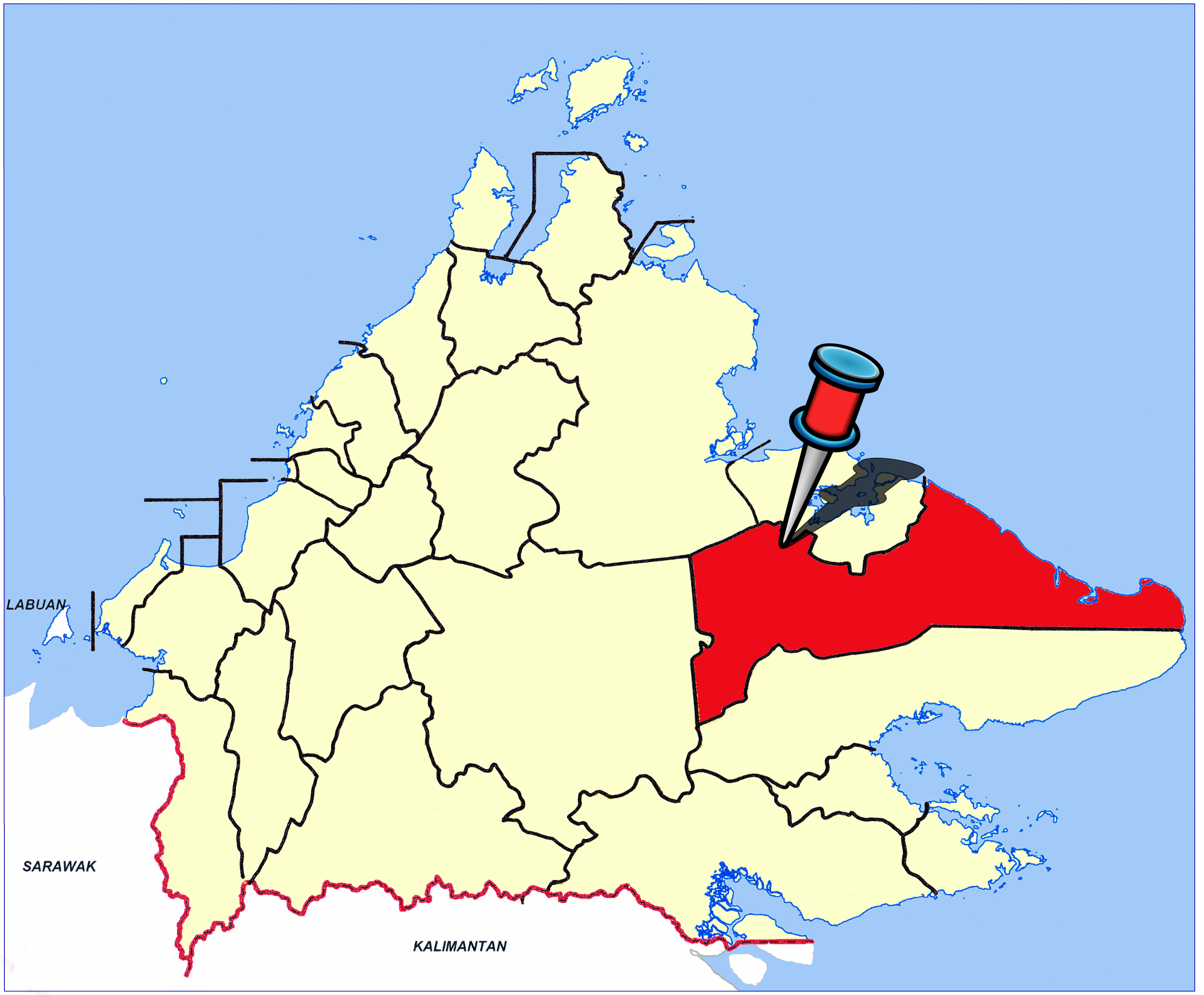
- Coordinates: 5°25′0″N 117°35′0″E
- Country: Malaysia
- State: Sabah
- Division: Sandakan
- District: Kinabatangan

Population (2010)
  - Total: 10,256

Kinabatangan (Malay: Pekan Kinabatangan), also named Kota Kinabatangan, is the capital of the Kinabatangan District in the Sandakan Division of Sabah, Malaysia. Its population was estimated to be around 10,256 in 2010. Kinabatangan is mostly populated with the Orang Sungai tribe, one of the indigenous groups of Sabah.
