= Sandakan (federal constituency) =

Federal constituency of Sabah, Malaysia

Sandakan (P186)
Sabah constituency

Federal constituency
- Legislature: Dewan Rakyat
- MP: Vivian Wong Shir Yee; PH
- Constituency created: 1966
- First contested: 1969
- Last contested: 2022

Demographics
- Population (2020): 121,672
- Electors (2025): 55,771
- Area (km²): 26
- Pop. density (per km²): 4,679.7

Sandakan is a federal constituency in Sandakan Division (Sandakan District), Sabah, Malaysia, that has been represented in the Dewan Rakyat since 1971.

The federal constituency was created in the 1966 redistribution and is mandated to return a single member to the Dewan Rakyat under the first past the post voting system.

== Demographics ==
https://ge15.orientaldaily.com.my/seats/sabah/p

Ethnic breakdown of Sandakan's electorate as of 2022
1. Chinese (44.2%)
2. Malay-Muslim Bumiputera (26.6%)
3. Sabah Bumiputera (23.5%)
4. Other ethnicities (5.60%)

As of 2020, Sandakan has a population of 121,672 people.

Age breakdown of Sandakan's electorate as of 2022
1. 18-20 (6.58%)
2. 21-29 (22.3%)
3. 30-39 (20.6%)
4. 40-49 (15.7%)
5. 50-59 (13.4%)
6. 60-69 (12.1%)
7. 70-79 (5.60%)
8. 80-89 (2.43%)
9. above 90 (1.25%)
Gender breakdown of Sandakan's electorate as of 2022
1. Male (51.4%)
2. Female (48.6%)

== History ==
=== Polling districts ===
According to the gazette issued on 21 November 2025, the Sandakan constituency has a total of 17 polling districts.

State constituency	Polling District	Code	Location
Elopura (N55)	Taman Indah Jaya	186/55/01	SMK Muhibbah; SK Muhibbah
Elopura (N55)	Beatrice	186/55/02	SMK Konven St. Cecilia
Elopura (N55)	Batu 1 Jalan Utara	186/55/03	SJK (C) Chi Hwa
Elopura (N55)	Batu 2 Jalan Utara	186/55/04	SMK Sandakan
Elopura (N55)	Trig Hill	186/55/05	SM Sung Siew
Elopura (N55)	Jalan Utara	186/55/06	SM Yu Yuan
Elopura (N55)	Pecky Valley	186/55/07	SMK St. Mary Sandakan
Elopura (N55)	Sungai Anip	186/55/08	Tadika Chi Hwa
Elopura (N55)	Batu 3 Jalan Utara	186/55/09	SK St. Mary Town
Elopura (N55)	Batu 5 Jalan Utara	186/55/10	SK St. Monica
Tanjong Papat (N56)	Happy Valley	186/56/01	SMK St. Michael
Tanjong Papat (N56)	Sandakan Pekan	186/56/02	SJK (C) Cheng Min
Tanjong Papat (N56)	Cathay	186/56/03	Padang Bandaran Sandakan
Tanjong Papat (N56)	Pasar	186/56/04	Astaka Padang Bandaran
Tanjong Papat (N56)	Sim-Sim	186/56/05	SK Sungai Anib 1
Tanjong Papat (N56)	Pulau Berhala	186/56/06	SK Sri Tanjung Papat 1; SK Sri Tanjung Papat 2
Tanjong Papat (N56)	Jalan Dua	186/56/07	Wisma Sandaraya

=== Representation history ===
Members of Parliament for Sandakan
Parliament	No	Years	Member	Party	Vote Share
Constituency created
		1969-1971	Parliament was suspended		
3rd	P116	1971-1973	Peter Lo Sui Yin (罗思仁)	SCA	5,838; 64.63%
3rd	P116	1973-1974	Peter Lo Sui Yin (罗思仁)	BN (SCA)	5,838; 64.63%
4th	P123	1974-1978	Peter Lim Pui Ho (林培河)	BN (SCA)	Uncontested
5th	P123	1978-1982	Fung Ket Wing (冯杰荣)	DAP	8,933; 50.56%
6th	P123	1982-1986	Fung Ket Wing (冯杰荣)	DAP	12,127; 58.20%
7th	P140	1986-1990	Fung Ket Wing (冯杰荣)	DAP	12,710; 64.67%
8th	P140	1990-1995	Lai Lun Tze (赖麟趾)	PBS	110,163; 52.23%
9th	P161	1995-1999	Lau Ngan Siew (刘彦修)	BN (LDP)	12,892; 48.08%
10th	P161	1999-2004	Lau Ngan Siew (刘彦修)	BN (LDP)	12,998; 52.87%
11th	P186	2004-2008	Chong Hon Min (张汉明)	Independent	9,538; 52.15%
12th	P186	2008-2013	Liew Vui Keong (刘伟强)	BN (LDP)	8,297; 42.89%
13th	P186	2013-2015	Wong Tien Fatt (黄天发)	PR (DAP)	14,226; 51.99%
13th	P186	2015–2018	Wong Tien Fatt (黄天发)	PH (DAP)	14,226; 51.99%
14th	P186	2018-2019	Wong Tien Fatt (黄天发)	PH (DAP)	19,094; 67.97%
14th	P186	2019-2022	Vivian Wong Shir Yee (黄诗怡)	PH (DAP)	16,012; 74.15%
15th	P186	2022–present	Vivian Wong Shir Yee (黄诗怡)	PH (DAP)	16,673; 53.92%

=== State constituency ===
Parliamentary constituency	State constituency					
Parliamentary constituency	1967–1974	1974–1985	1985–1995	1995–2004	2004–2020	2020–present
Sandakan		Bandar Sandakan				
Sandakan	Elopura					
Sandakan		Karamunting				
Sandakan	Sandakan Bandar					
Sandakan			Tanjong Papat			

=== Historical boundaries ===
State Constituency	Area					
State Constituency	1966	1974	1984	1994	2003	2019
Bandar Sandakan		Jalan Dua; Pulau Berhala; Sandakan; Sim-Sim; Tanjong Papat				
Elopura	Bukit Trig; Elopura; Kampung Botol; Jalan Utara; Tanah Merah	Elopura; Jalan Utara; Kampung Sungai Kayu; Kampung Tinusa; Taman Indah Jaya	Elopura; Jalan Utara; Kampung Botol; Taman Indah Jaya; Taman Sanny		Jalan Utara; Kampung Botol; Taman Indah Jaya; Taman Pak Tak; Taman Sanny	Elopura; Jalan Utara; Kampung Botol; Taman Indah Jaya; Taman Sanny
Karamunting		Karamunting; Leila; Ramai-Ramai; Taman Melanta; Tanah Merah				
Sandakan Bandar	Leila; Pulau Berhala; Sandakan; Sim-Sim; Tanah Merah					
Tanjong Papat			Jalan Dua; Pulau Berhala; Sandakan; Sim-Sim; Tanjong Papat			

=== Current state assembly members ===
No.	State Constituency	Member	Coalition (Party)
N55	Elopura	Calvin Chong Ket Kiun	WARISAN
N56	Tanjong Papat	Alex Thien Ching Qiang	WARISAN

=== Local governments & postcodes ===
No.	State Constituency	Local Government	Postcode
N55	Elopura	Sandakan Municipal Council	90000, 90300 Sandakan
N56	Tanjong Papat	Sandakan Municipal Council	90000, 90300 Sandakan

== Election results ==
Malaysian general election, 2022
Party	Candidate	Votes	%	∆%
PH	Vivian Wong Shir Yee	16,673	53.92	▲53.92
Heritage	Alex Thien Ching Qiang	5,642	18.25	▲18.25
GRS	Lau Chee Keong @ Thomas Lau	5,054	16.35	▲16.35
Independent	Peter Hu Chang Lik @ Hii Chang Lik	2,342	7.57	▲7.57
Independent	Sheikh Lokeman	962	3.11	▲3.11
Independent	Lita Tan Abdullah	246	0.80	▲0.80
Total valid votes		30,919	100.00	
Total rejected ballots		480		
Unreturned ballots		134		
Turnout		31,533	55.67	▲1.23
Registered electors		55,542		
Majority		11,031	35.67	▼17.68
PH hold		Swing		
Source(s) https://lom.agc.gov.my/ilims/upload/portal/akta/outputp/1753262/PUB619_2022.pdf

Malaysian general by-election, 11 May 2019 Upon the death of the incumbent, Wong Tien Fatt
Party	Candidate	Votes	%	∆%
DAP	Vivian Wong Shir Yee	16,012	74.15	▲6.18
PBS	Linda Tsen Thau Lin	4,491	20.80	▼14.3
Independent	Hamza A. Abdullah @ Hamzah	788	3.65	▲3.65
Independent	Chia Siew Yung	178	0.82	▲0.82
Independent	Sulaiman Abdul Samat	126	0.58	▲0.58
Total valid votes		21,595	100.00	
Total rejected ballots		234		
Unreturned ballots		18		
Turnout		21,847	54.44	▲17.63
Registered electors		40,131		
Majority		11,521	53.35	▲17.40
DAP hold		Swing		
Source(s): 1. "Keputusan Pilihan Raya Kecil P.186 Sandakan". Suruhanjaya Pilihan Raya Malaysia. 2019-05-11.

Malaysian general election, 2018
Party	Candidate	Votes	%	∆%
DAP	Wong Tien Fatt	19,094	67.97	▲15.98
BN	Lim Ming Hoo	8,996	32.03	▼15.98
Total valid votes		28,090	100.00	
Total rejected ballots		502		
Unreturned ballots		76		
Turnout		28,668	72.07	▼3.28
Registered electors		39,777		
Majority		10,098	35.95	▲31.97
DAP hold		Swing		
Source(s) "His Majesty's Government Gazette - Notice of Contested Election, Parliament for the State of Sabah [P.U. (B) 246/2018]" (PDF). Attorney General's Chambers of Malaysia. 3 May 2018. "Federal Government Gazette - Results of Contested Election and Statements of the Poll after the Official Addition of Votes, Parliamentary Constituencies for the State of Sabah [P.U. (B) 320/2018]" (PDF). Attorney General's Chambers of Malaysia. 28 May 2018. Archived from the original (PDF) on 2019-12-29.

Malaysian general election, 2013
Party	Candidate	Votes	%	∆%
DAP	Wong Tien Fatt	14,226	51.99	▲10.01
BN	Liew Vui Keong	13,138	48.01	▼5.02
Total valid votes		27,364	100.00	
Total rejected ballots		525		
Unreturned ballots		34		
Turnout		27,923	75.35	▲14.32
Registered electors		37,058		
Majority		1,088	3.98	▲3.07
DAP gain from BN		Swing		?
Source(s) "Federal Government Gazette - Notice of Contested Election, Parliament for the State of Sabah [P.U. (B) 183/2013]" (PDF). Attorney General's Chambers of Malaysia. 26 April 2013. Archived from the original (PDF) on 2018-09-30. "Federal Government Gazette - Results of Contested Election and Statements of the Poll after the Official Addition of Votes, Parliamentary Constituencies for the State of Sabah [P.U. (B) 224/2013]" (PDF). Attorney General's Chambers of Malaysia. 22 May 2013. Archived from the original (PDF) on 2018-09-30.

Malaysian general election, 2008
Party	Candidate	Votes	%	∆%
BN	Liew Vui Keong	8,297	42.89	▼1.99
DAP	Chong Chui Lin @ Shanty	8,121	41.98	▲41.98
Independent	Fong Vun Fui	2,929	15.14	▲15.14
Total valid votes		19,347	100.00	
Total rejected ballots		644		
Unreturned ballots		57		
Turnout		20,048	61.03	▲4.42
Registered electors		32,847		
Majority		176	0.91	▼6.36
BN gain from Independent		Swing		?

Malaysian general election, 2004
Party	Candidate	Votes	%	∆%
Independent	Chong Hon Min	9,538	52.15	▲52.15
BN	Lau Ngan Siew	8,208	44.88	▼7.99
Pan-Malaysian Islamic PartyOK	Liew Teck Khen @ Liaw Teck King	543	2.97	▲2.97
Total valid votes		18,289	100.00	
Total rejected ballots		385		
Unreturned ballots		124		
Turnout		18,798	56.61	▲0.93
Registered electors		33,208		
Majority		1,330	7.27	▼10.50
Independent gain from BN		Swing		?

Malaysian general election, 1999
Party	Candidate	Votes	%	∆%
BN	Lau Ngan Siew	12,998	52.87	▲4.79
PBS	Sak Cheong Yu	8,630	35.10	▲19.80
MDP	Fung Ket Wing	2,956	12.02	▲12.02
Total valid votes		24,584	100.00	
Total rejected ballots		296		
Unreturned ballots		537		
Turnout		25,417	55.68	▼9.75
Registered electors		45,645		
Majority		4,368	17.77	▲6.31
BN hold		Swing		

Malaysian general election, 1995
Party	Candidate	Votes	%	∆%
BN	Lau Ngan Siew	12,892	48.08	▲48.08
DAP	Ang Lian Hai	9,818	36.62	▼11.15
PBS	Chong Ket Wah @ Chong Ket Fah	4,103	15.30	▼36.93
Total valid votes		26,813	100.00	
Total rejected ballots		249		
Unreturned ballots		152		
Turnout		27,214	65.43	▲11.68
Registered electors		41,590		
Majority		3,074	11.46	▲7.00
BN gain from PBS		Swing		?

Malaysian general election, 1990
Party	Candidate	Votes	%	∆%
PBS	Lai Lun Tze	10,163	52.23	▲52.23
DAP	Ang Lian Hai	9,295	47.77	▼16.90
Total valid votes		19,458	100.00	
Total rejected ballots		1,377		
Unreturned ballots		0		
Turnout		20,835	53.75	▼5.48
Registered electors		38,761		
Majority		868	4.46	▼24.88
PBS gain from DAP		Swing		?

Malaysian general election, 1986
Party	Candidate	Votes	%	∆%
DAP	Fung Ket Wing	12,710	64.67	▲6.47
BN	Andrew Tham Chee Nam	6,943	35.33	▼6.47
Total valid votes		19,653	100.00	
Total rejected ballots		85		
Unreturned ballots		0		
Turnout		19,738	59.23	▼8.10
Registered electors		33,325		
Majority		5,767	29.34	▲12.94
DAP hold		Swing		

Malaysian general election, 1982
Party	Candidate	Votes	%	∆%
DAP	Fung Ket Wing	12,127	58.20	▲7.64
BN	Ian Chin	8,711	41.80	▲6.18
Total valid votes		20,838	100.00	
Total rejected ballots		195		
Unreturned ballots		0		
Turnout		21,033	67.33	▼1.07
Registered electors		31,239		
Majority		3,416	16.40	▲1.46
DAP hold		Swing		

Malaysian general election, 1978
Party	Candidate	Votes	%	∆%
DAP	Fung Ket Wing	8,933	50.56	
BN	Vincent Wong Fu Bin	6,294	35.62	
Independent	Alexander Khoo Kay Mian	2,066	11.69	
SCA	Philip Fu Sui Cheong	376	2.12	
Total valid votes		17,669	100.00	
Total rejected ballots		277		
Unreturned ballots		0		
Turnout		17,946	68.40	
Registered electors		26,236		
Majority		2,639	14.94	
DAP gain from BN		Swing		?

Malaysian general election, 1974
Party	Candidate	Votes	%	∆%
On the nomination day, Peter Lim Pui Ho won uncontested.
BN	Peter Lim Pui Ho			
Total valid votes			100.00	
Total rejected ballots				
Unreturned ballots				
Turnout				
Registered electors		18,195		
Majority				
BN gain from SCA		Swing		?

Malaysian general election, 1969
Party	Candidate	Votes	%
SCA	Peter Lo Sui Yin	5,838	64.63
Independent	Chong Thain Vun	3,195	35.37
Total valid votes		9,033	100.00
Total rejected ballots		176	
Unreturned ballots			
Turnout		9,209	72.90
Registered electors		12,625	
Majority		2,643	29.26
This was a new constituency created.
