= Liew Vui Keong =

Malaysian politician (1960–2020)

Yang Berbahagia Datuk Liew Vui Keong PGDK JP
- 刘伟强
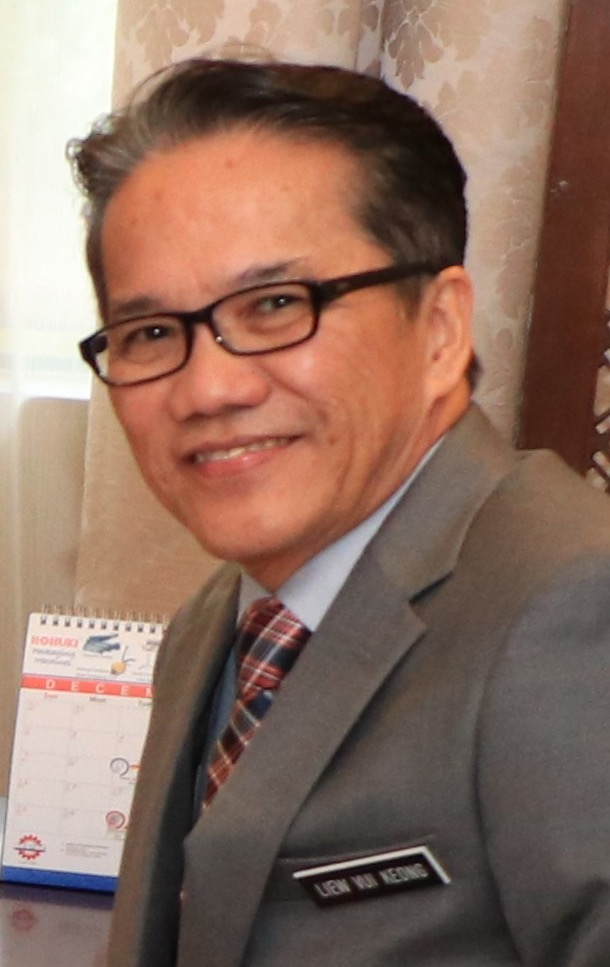

Minister in the Prime Minister's Department Legal Affairs
- In office 2 July 2018 – 24 February 2020
- Monarchs: Muhammad V (2018–2019); Abdullah (2019–2020)
- Prime Minister: Mahathir Mohamad
- Deputy: Mohamed Hanipa Maidin
- Preceded by: Azalina Othman Said
- Succeeded by: Takiyuddin Hassan
- Constituency: Batu Sapi

Deputy Minister in the Prime Minister's Department Legal Affairs
- In office 10 April 2009 – 15 May 2013
- Monarchs: Mizan Zainal Abidin (2009–2011); Abdul Halim (2011–2013)
- Prime Minister: Najib Razak
- Minister: Mohamed Nazri Abdul Aziz
- Preceded by: Hasan Malek
- Succeeded by: Razali Ibrahim
- Constituency: Sandakan

Deputy Minister of International Trade and Industry I
- In office 19 March 2008 – 9 April 2009 Serving with Jacob Dungau Sagan
- Monarch: Mizan Zainal Abidin
- Prime Minister: Abdullah Ahmad Badawi
- Minister: Muhyiddin Yassin
- Preceded by: Ahmad Husni Hanadzlah
- Succeeded by: Mukhriz Mahathir
- Constituency: Sandakan

3rd President of Liberal Democratic Party
- In office 18 August 2006 – 2014
- Deputy: Chin Su Phin
- Preceded by: Chong Kah Kiat
- Succeeded by: Teo Chee Kang
- Constituency: Sandakan

Member of the Malaysian Parliament for Batu Sapi
- In office 9 May 2018 – 2 October 2020
- Preceded by: Tsen Thau Lin (BN–PBS)
- Succeeded by: Khairul Firdaus Akbar Khan (GRS–Sabah BERSATU)
- Majority: 4,619 (2018)

Member of the Malaysian Parliament for Sandakan
- In office 8 March 2008 – 5 May 2013
- Preceded by: Chong Hon Min (IND)
- Succeeded by: Wong Tien Fatt (DAP)
- Majority: 176 (2008)

Personal details
- Born: 18 January 1960 Kota Belud, Crown Colony of North Borneo (now Sabah, Malaysia)
- Died: 2 October 2020 (aged 60) Kota Kinabalu, Sabah, Malaysia
- Resting place: Nirvana Memorial Park Kota Kinabalu, Mile 17, Old Tuaran Road, Telipok, Kota Kinabalu
- Party: Liberal Democratic Party (LDP) (1994–2018); Sabah Heritage Party (WARISAN) (2018–2020)
- Other political affiliations: Barisan Nasional (BN) (1994-2018); Pakatan Harapan (PH) (allied) (2018–2020)
- Spouse: Lindai Lee
- Occupation: Politician

Zachary David Liew Vui Keong (simplified Chinese: 刘伟强; traditional Chinese: 劉偉強; pinyin: Liú Wěiqiáng; Pha̍k-fa-sṳ: Liù Vî-khiòng; 18 January 1960 – 2 October 2020) was a Malaysian politician who served as the Minister in the Prime Minister's Department in charge of legal affairs in the Pakatan Harapan (PH) administration under former Prime Minister Mahathir Mohamad from July 2018 to the collapse of the PH administration in February 2020 and Deputy Minister in the Prime Minister's Department also in charge of legal affairs as well as Deputy Minister of International Trade and Industry I in the Barisan Nasional (BN) administration under former Prime Ministers Abdullah Ahmad Badawi and Najib Razak from March 2008 to May 2013. He also served as the Member of Parliament (MP) for Batu Sapi from May 2018 till his death in October 2020 and for Sandakan from March 2008 to his defeat in May 2013. He served as the 3rd President of the Liberal Democratic Party (LDP) from 2006 to 2014, when he was replaced by Teo Chee Kang in a rancorous internal dispute. He disputed Teo's claim of the LDP party presidency with the Registrar of Societies (RoS). In 2018, Liew led about 200 LDP members to leave the party. He then joined another Sabah-based political party, Sabah Heritage Party (WARISAN) led by former Chief Minister of Sabah Shafie Apdal and served as its Permanent Chairman.

On 2 October 2020, Liew died at the age of 60 from pneumonia while being treated for a slipped disc.

== Political career ==
=== Criticism over ESSCOM ===
In 2016, Liew criticised the Eastern Sabah Security Command (ESSCOM) and said it is a "complete failure" especially with the continuous abduction and urged the security council should sit down with the stakeholders and lay out their weaknesses, including a need for a complete revamp of their standard operating procedures and how to deal with pirates and militant groups.

=== Capital punishment abolishment ===
Following the formation of a new Malaysian government and his subsequent appointment as a Minister in the Prime Minister's Department on law matters in 2018, he stated that Malaysia's new government was planning to abolish mandatory capital punishment for all situations including for serious crimes, which later has been heavily opposed by many organisations and social groups in the country who were against a total abolition of capital punishment due to the already high level of serious crimes.

== Controversy ==
=== LDP's legal tangle ===
Liew had sacked 23 out of the 35 supreme council members as party members demanded that the top two positions be contested. He was subsequently removed from his presidency post and was replaced by the sacked Secretary General Teo Chee Kang for his act of abuse of power in an attempt to consolidate his position as president. Liew's appeal to the Court of appeal over his removal from the presidency post was dismissed.

== Elections ==
=== 2013 general election ===
In the 2013 election, Liew faced Wong Tien Fatt of the Democratic Action Party (DAP) and lost his parliamentary seat.

=== 2018 general election ===
In the 2018 election, Liew was fielded as a candidate by his new party of WARISAN to contest the Batu Sapi parliamentary seat. He successfully won the seat by defeating Linda Tsen Thau Lin of the United Sabah Party (PBS).

== Election results ==
Parliament of Malaysia
Year	Constituency	Candidate	Votes	Pct	Opponent(s)	Votes	Pct	Ballots cast	Majority	Turnout
2008	P186 Sandakan	Liew Vui Keong (LDP)	8,297	42.89%	Chong Chui Lin (DAP)	8,121	41.98%	20,048	176	61.03%
2008	P186 Sandakan	Liew Vui Keong (LDP)	8,297	42.89%	Fong Vun Fui (IND)	2,929	15.14%	20,048	176	61.03%
2013	P186 Sandakan	Liew Vui Keong (LDP)	13,138	48.01%	Wong Tien Fatt (DAP)	14,226	51.99%	27,923	1,088	75.35%
2018	P185 Batu Sapi	Liew Vui Keong (WARISAN)	12,976	55.78%	Tsen Thau Lin (PBS)	8,357	35.93%	24,029	4,619	73.77%
2018	P185 Batu Sapi	Liew Vui Keong (WARISAN)	12,976	55.78%	Hamza A. Abdullah (AMANAH)	980	4.21%	24,029	4,619	73.77%
2018	P185 Batu Sapi	Liew Vui Keong (WARISAN)	12,976	55.78%	Norsah Bongsu (PAS)	948	4.08%	24,029	4,619	73.77%

== Honours ==
=== Honours of Malaysia ===
- Sabah
  - Commander of the Order of Kinabalu (PGDK) – Datuk (2006)
  - Justice of the Peace (JP) (2004)
