= Linda Tsen =

Malaysian politician

Yang Berbahagia Datuk Linda Tsen Thau Lin PGDK

Member of the Malaysian Parliament for Batu Sapi, Sabah
- In office 4 November 2010 – 9 May 2018
- Preceded by: Edmund Chong Ket Wah
- Succeeded by: Liew Vui Keong

Personal details
- Born: 29 July 1956 (age 70) Sandakan, Crown Colony of North Borneo (now Sabah, Malaysia)
- Citizenship: Malaysian
- Party: United Sabah Party (PBS)
- Other political affiliations: Barisan Nasional (BN) (until 2018); Gabungan Bersatu Sabah (GBS) (2018–present)
- Spouse: Edmund Chong Ket Wah (d. 2010)
- Occupation: Politician

Linda Tsen Thau Lin (Chinese: 曾道玲; pinyin: Zēng Dàolíng) is a Malaysian politician. She is the former Member of the Parliament of Malaysia for the Batu Sapi constituency in Sandakan, Sabah, representing the United Sabah Party (PBS) in the former ruling Barisan Nasional (BN) coalition.

== Background ==
Tsen, born in Sandakan in 1956, attended her early education at Chi Hwa Primary School and Tiong Hwa Secondary School in Sandakan. She later further her study at St. Brandon School, United Kingdom; Trinity College of Music, London and Fellowship London College of Music. She is a musician and piano teacher, and has held the position of president of the Kota Kinabalu Music Society.

== Political career ==
Tsen was elected to federal Parliament in the Batu Sapi by-election on 4 November 2010 after the seat had been vacant upon the death of the incumbent who is Tsen's husband, Edmund Chong Ket Wah. She defeated candidates of the Sabah Progressive Party (SAPP) and the People's Justice Party (PKR). She successfully retained the seat in the 2013 general election but lost in the 2018 general election. In 2019, she contested again in the Sandakan by election, but was defeated by the Democratic Action Party (DAP) candidate Vivian Wong Shir Yee.

Tsen had previously served as the Women (Wanita) section head of PBS for Elopura division.

== Election results ==
Parliament of Malaysia
Year	Constituency	Candidate	Votes	Pct	Opponent(s)	Votes	Pct	Ballots cast	Majority	Turnout
2010	P185 Batu Sapi	Linda Tsen Thau Lin (PBS)	9,773	64.22%	Ansari Abdullah (PKR)	3,414	22.43%	15,613	6,359	61.03%
2010	P185 Batu Sapi	Linda Tsen Thau Lin (PBS)	9,773	64.22%	Yong Teck Lee (SAPP)	2,031	13.35%	15,613	6,359	61.03%
2013	P185 Batu Sapi	Linda Tsen Thau Lin (PBS)	13,085	57.44%	Hamzah Abdullah (PAS)	9,287	40.76%	23,400	3,798	77.49%
2013	P185 Batu Sapi	Linda Tsen Thau Lin (PBS)	13,085	57.44%	Saiful Bahari Rashada Ahmad (STAR)	410	1.80%	23,400	3,798	77.49%
2018	P185 Batu Sapi	Linda Tsen Thau Lin (PBS)	8,357	35.93%	Liew Vui Keong (WARISAN)	12,976	55.78%	24,029	4,619	73.77%
2018	P185 Batu Sapi	Linda Tsen Thau Lin (PBS)	8,357	35.93%	Hamzah Abdullah (AMANAH)	980	4.21%	24,029	4,619	73.77%
2018	P185 Batu Sapi	Linda Tsen Thau Lin (PBS)	8,357	35.93%	Norsah Bongsu (PAS)	948	4.08%	24,029	4,619	73.77%
2019	P186 Sandakan	Linda Tsen Thau Lin (PBS)	4,491	20.80%	Vivian Wong Shir Yee (DAP)	16,012	74.15%	40,131	11,521	54.44%
2019	P186 Sandakan	Linda Tsen Thau Lin (PBS)	4,491	20.80%	Hamzah Abdullah (IND)	788	3.65%	40,131	11,521	54.44%
2019	P186 Sandakan	Linda Tsen Thau Lin (PBS)	4,491	20.80%	Chia Siew Yung (IND)	178	0.82%	40,131	11,521	54.44%
2019	P186 Sandakan	Linda Tsen Thau Lin (PBS)	4,491	20.80%	Sulaiman Abdul Samat (IND)	126	0.58%	40,131	11,521	54.44%

== Honours ==
=== Honours of Malaysia ===
- Sabah
  - Commander of the Order of Kinabalu (PGDK) – Datuk (2013)
