= Batu Sapi =

Federal constituency in Sabah, Malaysia

Batu Sapi (P185)
Sabah constituency

Federal constituency
- Legislature: Dewan Rakyat
- MP: Khairul Firdaus Akbar Khan; GRS
- Constituency created: 2003
- First contested: 2004
- Last contested: 2022

Demographics
- Population (2020): 119,698
- Electors (2022): 47,133
- Area (km²): 454
- Pop. density (per km²): 263.7

Batu Sapi is a federal constituency in Sandakan Division (Sandakan District), Sabah, Malaysia, that has been represented in the Dewan Rakyat since 2004.

The federal constituency was created in the 2003 redistribution and is mandated to return a single member to the Dewan Rakyat under the first past the post voting system.

== Demographics ==
https://ge15.orientaldaily.com.my/seats/sabah/p

Ethnic breakdown of Batu Sapi's electorate as of 2022
1. Sabah Bumiputera (32.4%)
2. Malay-Muslim Bumiputera (31.7%)
3. Chinese (27.9%)
4. Other ethnicities (7.90%)

As of 2020, Batu Sapi has a population of 119,698 people.

Age breakdown of Batu Sapi's electorate as of 2022
1. 18-20 (7.00%)
2. 21-29 (24.1%)
3. 30-39 (22.2%)
4. 40-49 (15.3%)
5. 50-59 (13.3%)
6. 60-69 (10.1%)
7. 70-79 (4.57%)
8. 80-89 (2.03%)
9. above 90 (1.40%)
Gender breakdown of Batu Sapi's electorate as of 2022
1. Male (51.6%)
2. Female (48.4%)

== History ==
=== Polling districts ===
According to the gazette issued on 21 November 2025, the Batu Sapi constituency has a total of 11 polling districts.

State constituency	Polling District	Code	Location
Sekong (N53)	Jalan Sibuga	185/53/01	SMA Tun Juhar; SK Mawar
Sekong (N53)	Kampung Gas	185/53/02	SK Gas; SK Bambangan
Sekong (N53)	Jalan Batu Sapi	185/53/03	SMK Batu Sapi
Sekong (N53)	Tronglit	185/53/04	SK Pulau Timbang
Sekong (N53)	Sekong	185/53/05	SK Segaliud
Sekong (N53)	Lupak Meluas	185/53/06	SK Kg Bahagia
Sekong (N53)	Pulau Sanghai	185/53/07	SK Pulau Sanghai
Karamunting (N54)	Cecily	185/54/01	SJK (C) Yuk Choi
Karamunting (N54)	Tanah Merah	185/54/02	SJK (C) Sung Siew
Karamunting (N54)	Jalan Leila	185/54/03	Tadika Sung Siew
Karamunting (N54)	Kampung Gelam	185/54/04	Perpustakaan Wilayah Sandakan; SK Bandar Sandakan
Karamunting (N54)	Karamunting	185/54/05	SK Karamunting
Karamunting (N54)	Bokara	185/54/06	SK Sri Melanta Jaya

=== Representation history ===
Members of Parliament for Batu Sapi
Parliament	No	Years	Member	Party	Vote Share
Constituency created from Libaran and Sandakan
11th	P185	2004-2008	Edmund Chong Ket Wah (蒋国华)	BN (PBS)	Uncontested
12th	P185	2008-2010	Edmund Chong Ket Wah (蒋国华)	BN (PBS)	9,479; 62.16%
12th	P185	2010-2013	Tsen Thau Lin (曾道玲)	BN (PBS)	9,773; 64.22%
13th	P185	2013-2018	Tsen Thau Lin (曾道玲)	BN (PBS)	13,085; 57.44%
14th	P185	2018-2020	Liew Vui Keong (刘伟强)	WARISAN	12,976; 55.78%
14th	P185	2020-2022	Vacant (Note: Vacant from 2 October 2020 until the 2022 Malaysian general election due to the incumbent died in office. No by-election was held due to 2021 Malaysian Proclamation of Emergency in order to curb the COVID-19 pandemic.)		
15th	P185	2022	Khairul Firdaus Akbar Khan (خَيْرُٱلْفِرْدَوْس أَكْبَرخَان)	GRS (BERSATU)	12,152; 44.95%
15th	P185	2022–present	Khairul Firdaus Akbar Khan (خَيْرُٱلْفِرْدَوْس أَكْبَرخَان)	GRS (Direct)	12,152; 44.95%

=== State constituency ===
Parliamentary constituency	State constituency					
Parliamentary constituency	1967–1974	1974–1985	1985–1995	1995–2004	2004–2020	2020–present
Batu Sapi					Karamunting	
Batu Sapi					Sekong	

=== Historical boundaries ===
State Constituency	Area	
State Constituency	2003	2019
Karamunting	Karamunting; Pusat Bandar Sandakan; Ramai-Ramai; Taman Melanta; Tanah Merah	Karamunting; Pine Villa Estate; Pusat Bandar Sandakan; Ramai-Ramai; Tanah Merah
Sekong	Kampung Lot M; Segaliud; Selipok; Pulau Timbang; Taman Mawar	

=== Current state assembly members ===
No.	State Constituency	Member	Coalition (Party)
N53	Sekong	Alias Sani	WARISAN
N54	Karamunting	Alex Wong Tshun Khee	WARISAN

=== Local governments & postcodes ===
No.	State Constituency	Local Government	Postcode
N53	Sekong	Sandakan Municipal Council	90000 Sandakan; 90200 Kinabatangan
N54	Karamunting	Sandakan Municipal Council	90000 Sandakan; 90200 Kinabatangan

== Election results ==
Malaysian general election, 2022: Batu Sapi
Party	Candidate	Votes	%	∆%
GRS	Khairul Firdaus Akbar Khan	12,152	44.95	▲44.95
PH	Liau Fui Fui	7,331	27.11	▲27.11
Heritage	Alias Sani	7,218	26.70	▼29.08
PEJUANG	Boni Yusuf Abdullah @ Narseso P Juanico	176	0.65	▲0.65
Independent	Othman Ahmad	160	0.59	▲0.59
Total valid votes		27,037	100.00	
Total rejected ballots		479		
Unreturned ballots		92		
Turnout		27,608	61.57	▼12.20
Registered electors		43,916		
Majority		4,821	17.84	▼2.02
GRS gain from Heritage		Swing		?
Source(s) https://lom.agc.gov.my/ilims/upload/portal/akta/outputp/1753262/PUB619_2022.pdf

Malaysian general election, 2018: Batu Sapi
Party	Candidate	Votes	%	∆%
Sabah Heritage Party	Liew Vui Keong	12,976	55.78	▲55.78
BN	Tsen Thau Lin	8,357	35.93	▼21.51
Amanah	Hamza A. Abdullah @ Hamzah	980	4.21	▲4.21
PAS	Norsah Bongsu	948	4.08	▼36.68
Total valid votes		23,261	100.00	
Total rejected ballots		655		
Unreturned ballots		113		
Turnout		24,029	73.77	▼3.72
Registered electors		32,574		
Majority		4,619	19.86	▲3.18
Sabah Heritage Party gain from BN		Swing		?
Source(s) "His Majesty's Government Gazette - Notice of Contested Election, Parliament for the State of Sabah [P.U. (B) 246/2018]" (PDF). Attorney General's Chambers of Malaysia. 3 May 2018. "Federal Government Gazette - Results of Contested Election and Statements of the Poll after the Official Addition of Votes, Parliamentary Constituencies for the State of Sabah [P.U. (B) 320/2018]" (PDF). Attorney General's Chambers of Malaysia. 28 May 2018. Archived from the original (PDF) on 29 December 2019.

Malaysian general election, 2013: Batu Sapi
Party	Candidate	Votes	%	∆%
BN	Tsen Thau Lin	13,085	57.44	▼6.78
PAS	Hamza A. Abdullah @ Hamzah	9,287	40.76	▲40.76
STAR	Saiful Bahari Rashada Ahmad	410	1.80	▲1.80
Total valid votes		22,782	100.00	
Total rejected ballots		574		
Unreturned ballots		44		
Turnout		23,400	77.49	▲16.46
Registered electors		30,199		
Majority		3,798	16.68	▼25.11
BN hold		Swing		
Source(s) "Federal Government Gazette - Notice of Contested Election, Parliament for the State of Sabah [P.U. (B) 183/2013]" (PDF). Attorney General's Chambers of Malaysia. 26 April 2013. Archived from the original (PDF) on 30 September 2018. "Federal Government Gazette - Results of Contested Election and Statements of the Poll after the Official Addition of Votes, Parliamentary Constituencies for the State of Sabah [P.U. (B) 224/2013]" (PDF). Attorney General's Chambers of Malaysia. 22 May 2013. Archived from the original (PDF) on 30 September 2018.

Malaysian general by-election, 4 November 2010: Batu Sapi Upon the death of incumbent, Chong Ket Wah
Party	Candidate	Votes	%	∆%
BN	Tsen Thau Lin	9,773	64.22	▲2.06
PKR	Umsery @ Ansari Abdullah	3,414	22.43	▲22.43
SAPP	Yong Teck Lee	2,031	13.35	▲13.35
Total valid votes		15,218	100.00	
Total rejected ballots		372		
Unreturned ballots		23		
Turnout		15,613	61.03	▼2.03
Registered electors		25,582		
Majority		6,359	41.79	▲17.47
BN hold		Swing		
Source(s) "Pilihan Raya Kecil P.185 Batu Sapi". Election Commission of Malaysia.

Malaysian general election, 2008: Batu Sapi
Party	Candidate	Votes	%	∆%
BN	Chong Ket Wah @ Chong Ket Fah	9,479	62.16	▲62.16
Independent	Chung Kwong Wing	5,771	37.84	▲37.84
Total valid votes		15,250	100.00	
Total rejected ballots		730		
Unreturned ballots		418		
Turnout		16,398	63.06	
Registered electors		26,004		
Majority		3,708	24.32	
BN hold		Swing		

Malaysian general election, 2004: Batu Sapi
Party	Candidate	Votes	%
On the nomination day, Chong Ket Wah won uncontested.
BN	Chong Ket Wah @ Chong Ket Fah		
Total valid votes			100.00
Total rejected ballots			
Unreturned ballots			
Turnout			
Registered electors			
Majority			
This was a new constituency created.
