= Sandakan District =

Sandakan District Daerah Sandakan
- District
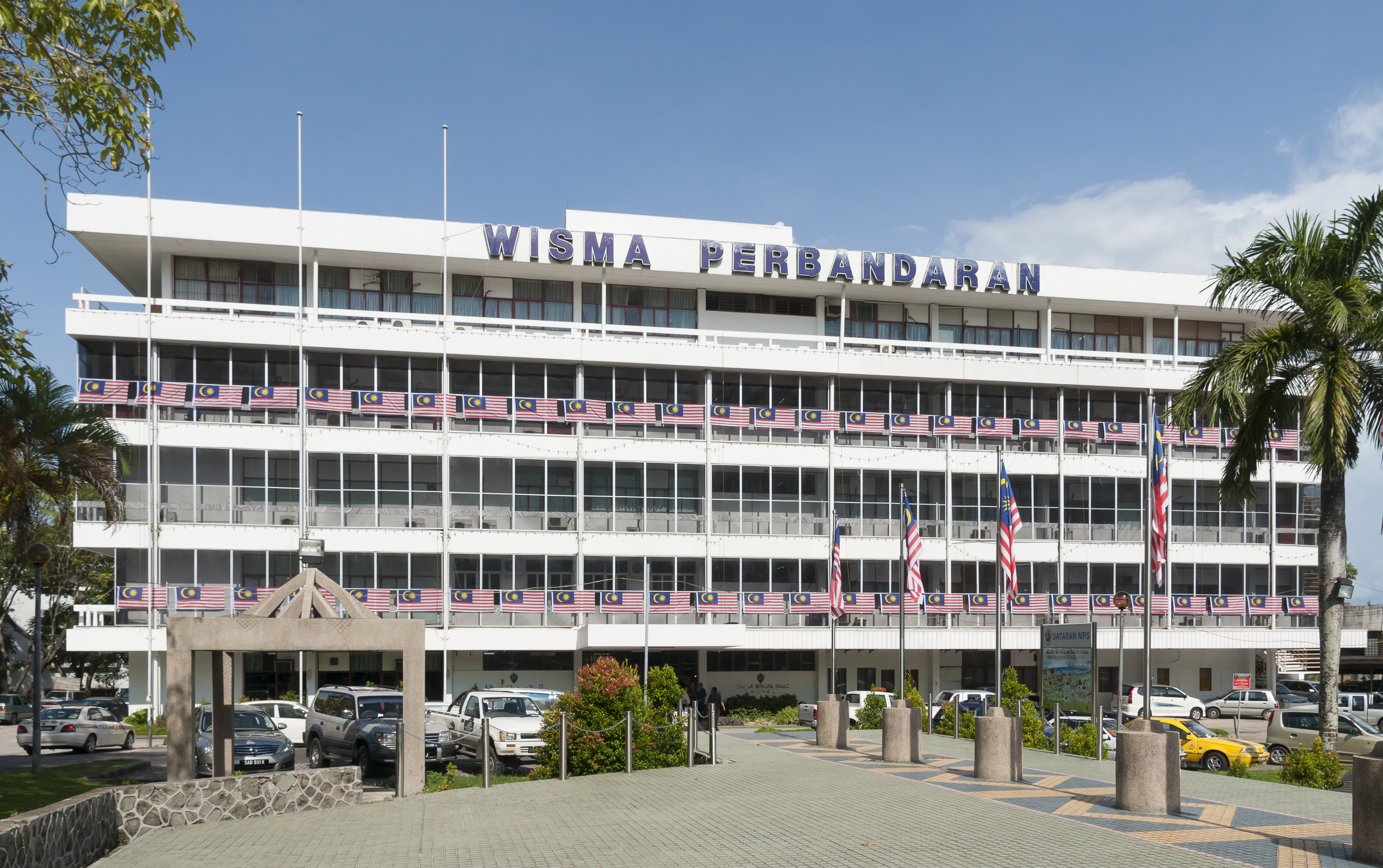
- Sandakan Municipal Council office.

- Seal

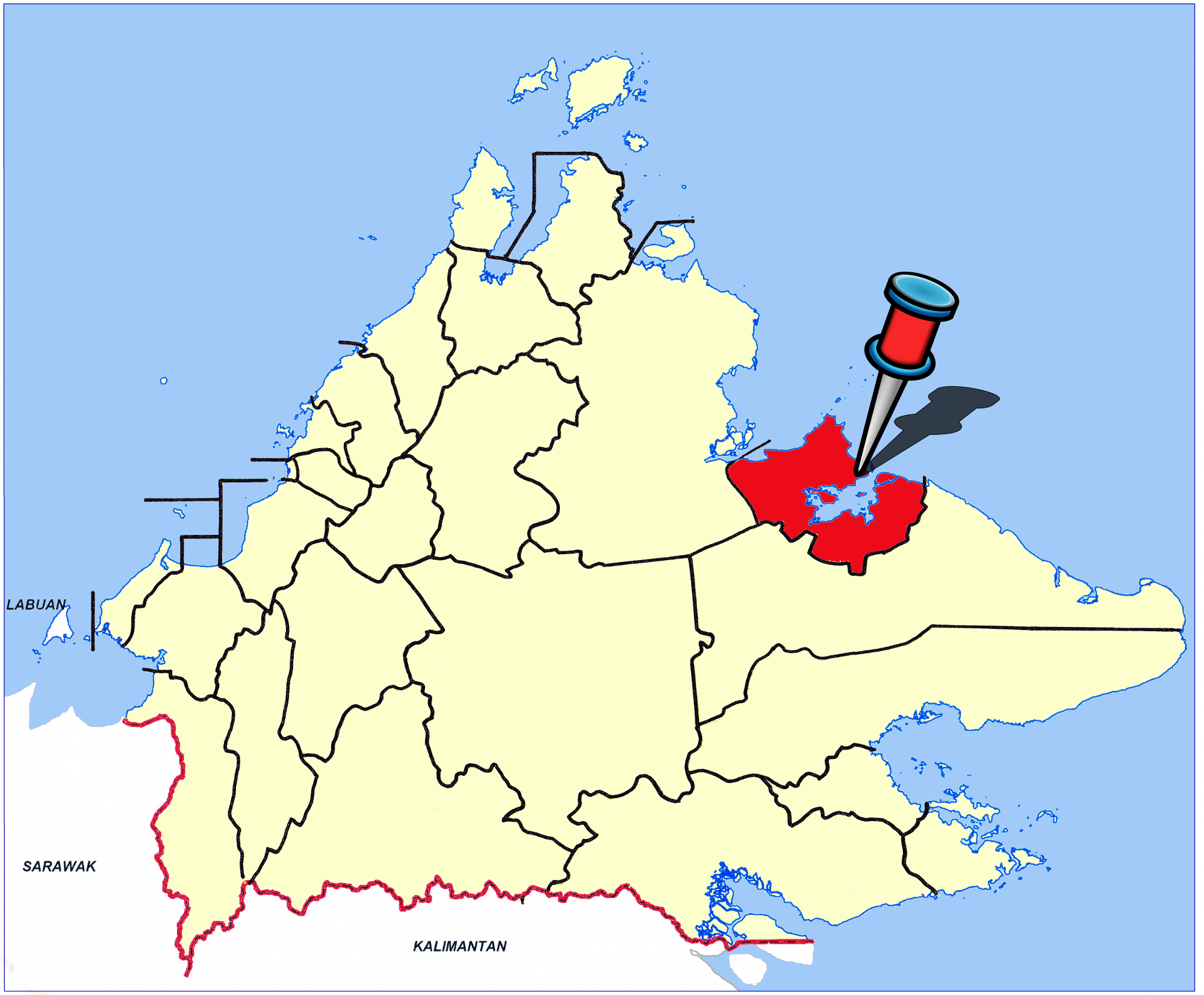
- Coordinates: 5°50′20″N 118°6′55″E
- Country: Malaysia
- State: Sabah
- Division: Sandakan
- Capital: Sandakan

Government
  - President (Sandakan Municipal Council): Benedict Asmat

Area
  - Total: 2,266 km^{2} (875 sq mi)

Population (2010)
  - Total: 396,290
- Website: mps.sabah.gov.my/portal/

Map of Sandakan District

The Sandakan District (Malay: Daerah Sandakan) is an administrative district in the Malaysian state of Sabah, part of the Sandakan Division which includes the districts of Beluran, Kinabatangan, Sandakan, Telupid, and Tongod. The capital of the district is in Sandakan City.

There are three members of parliament (MPs) representing the three parliamentary constituencies in the district: Libaran (P.184), Batu Sapi (P.185), and Sandakan (P.186).

== Demographics ==
Sandakan district is the third largest of Sabah's 25 districts, with 396,290 inhabitants after Kota Kinabalu and Tawau.

== Gallery ==
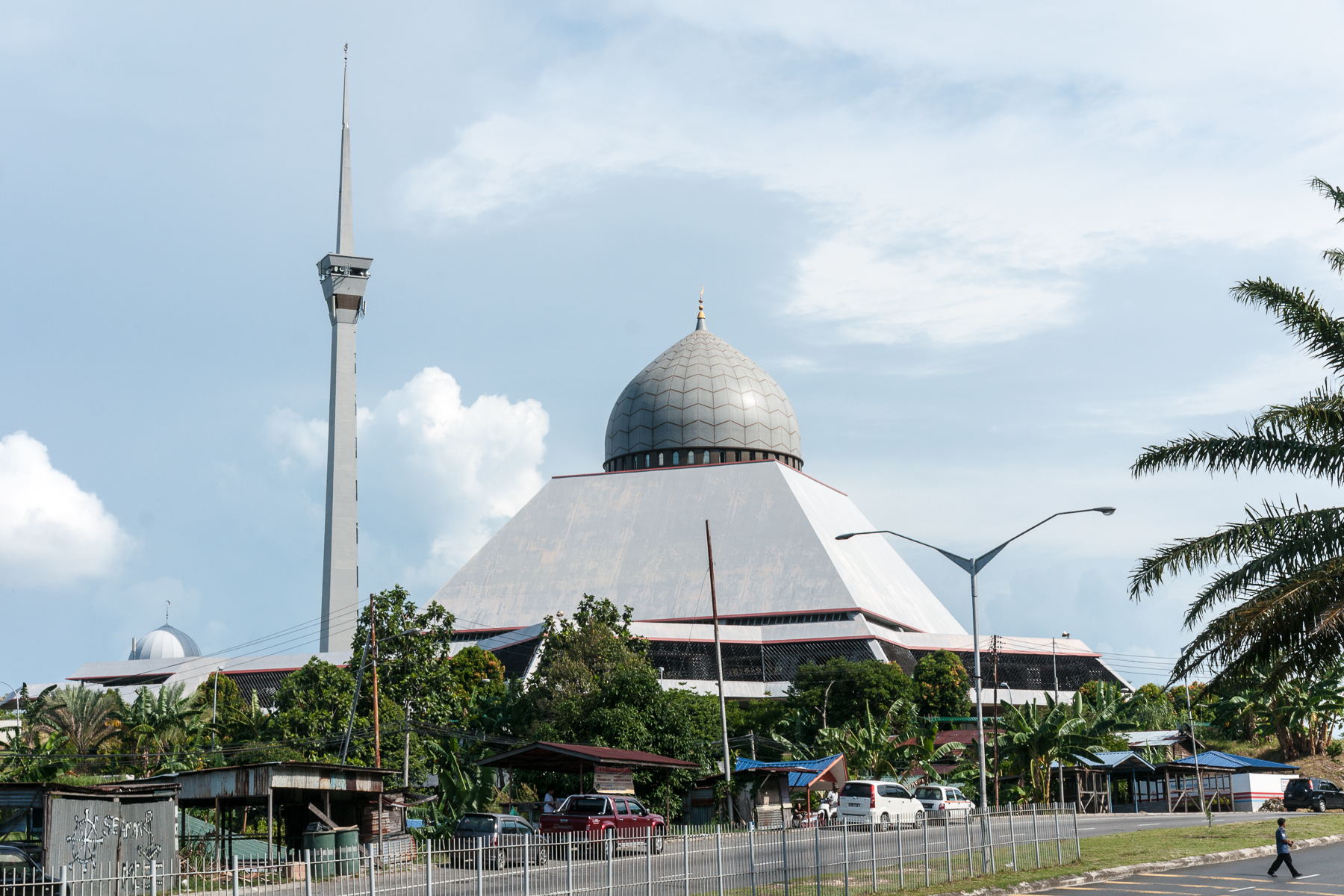
Sandakan District Mosque.

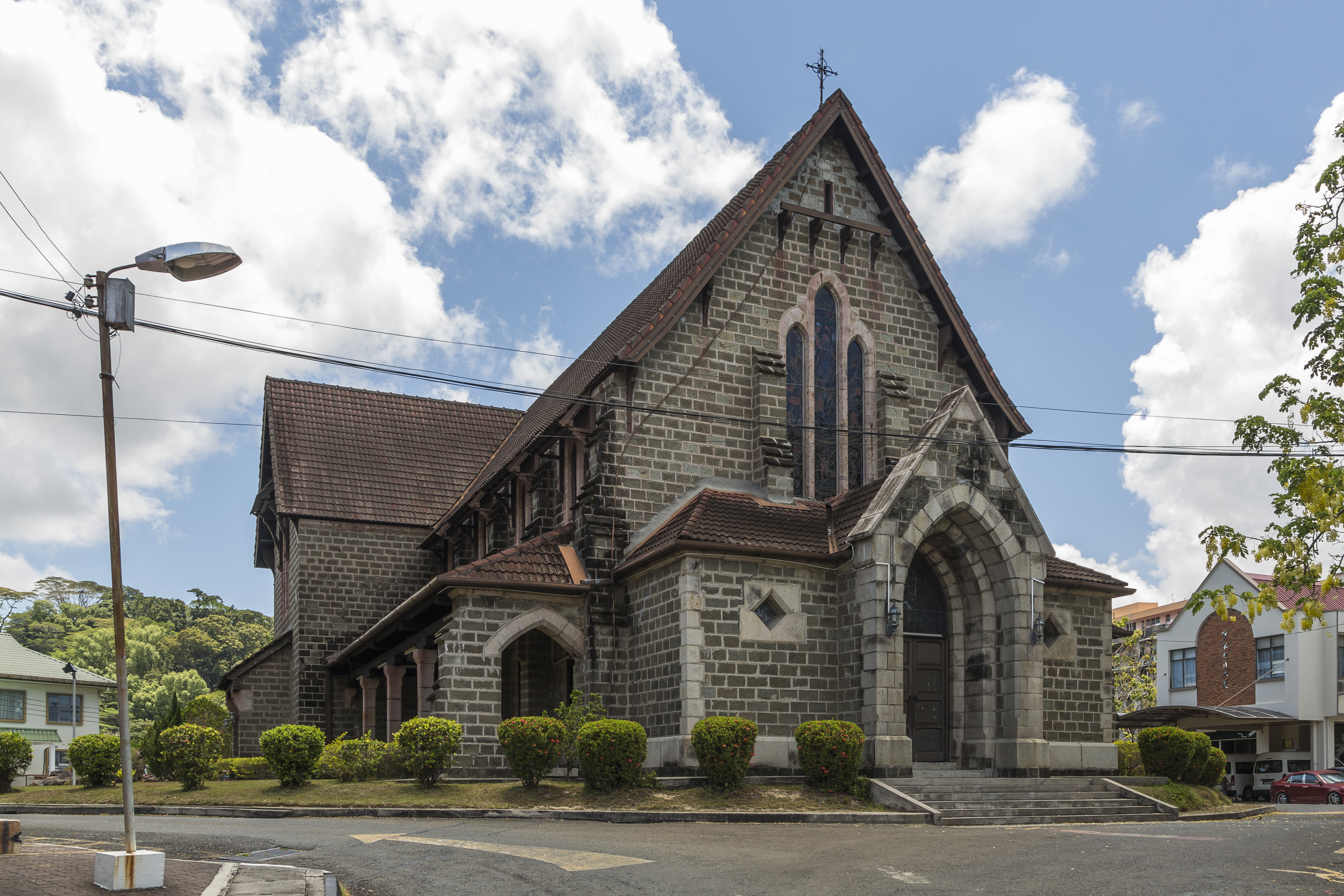
St. Michael's and All Angels Anglican Church.

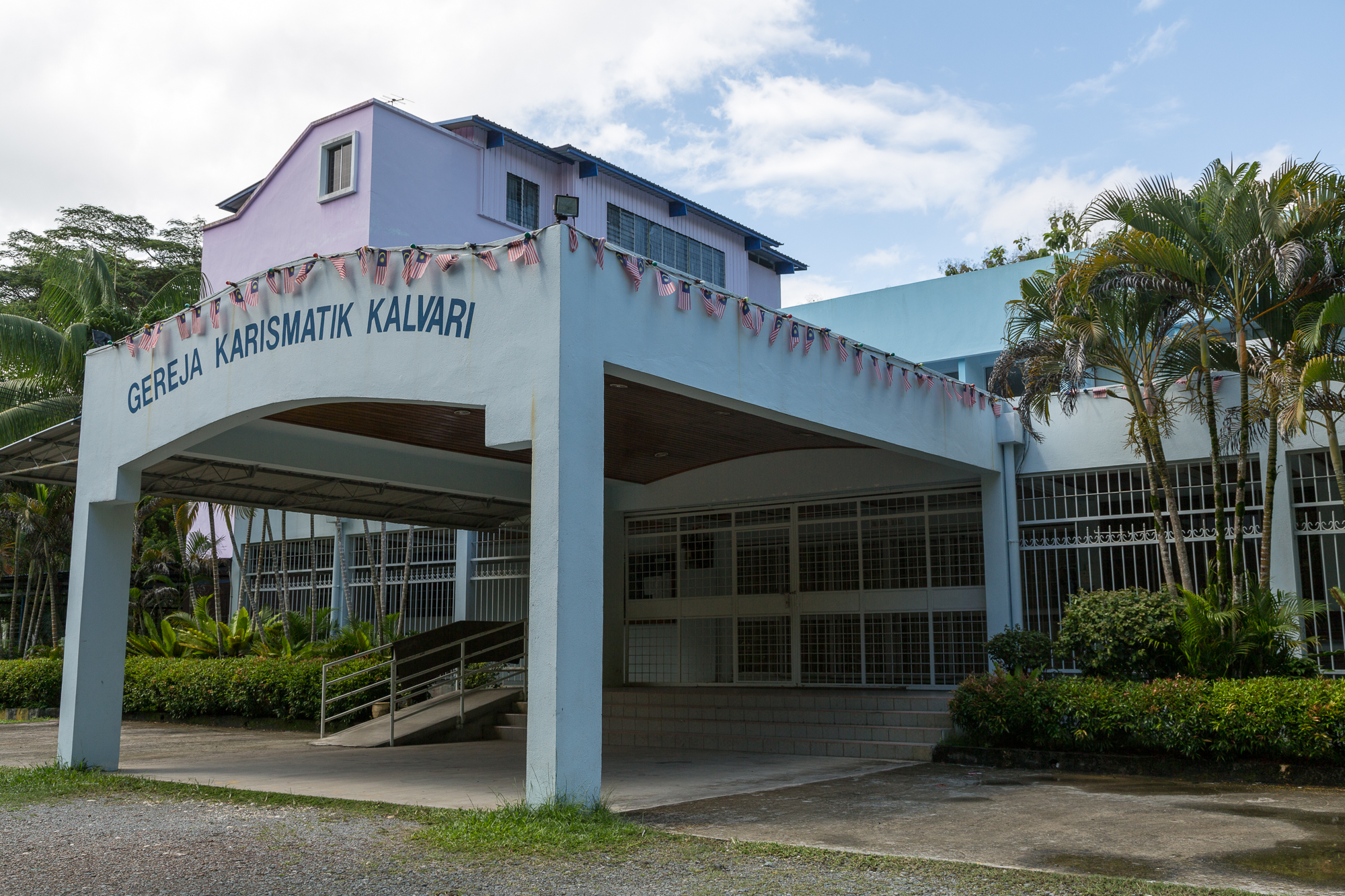
Sandakan Calvary Charismatic Church.

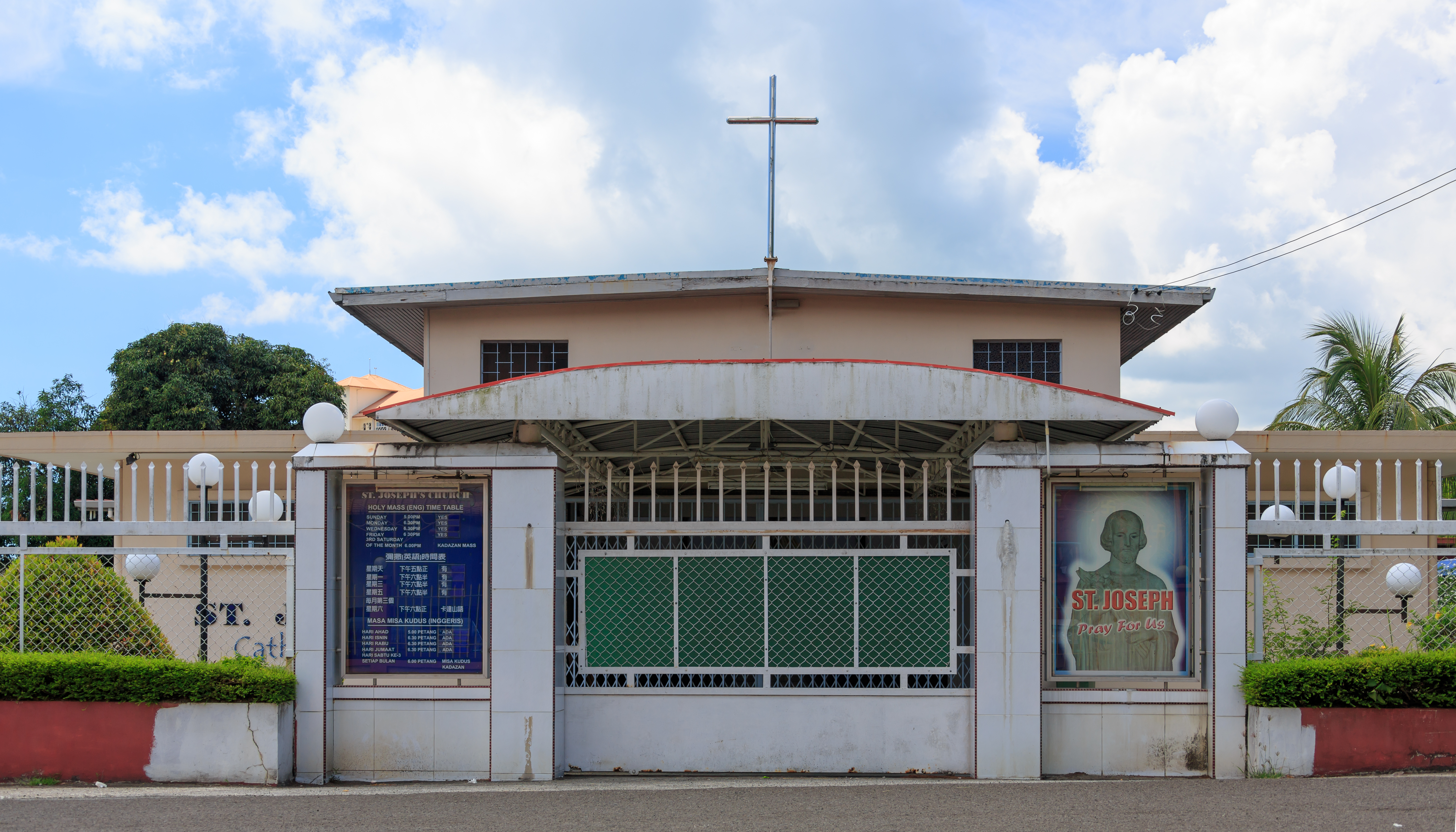
St. Joseph Catholic Church.

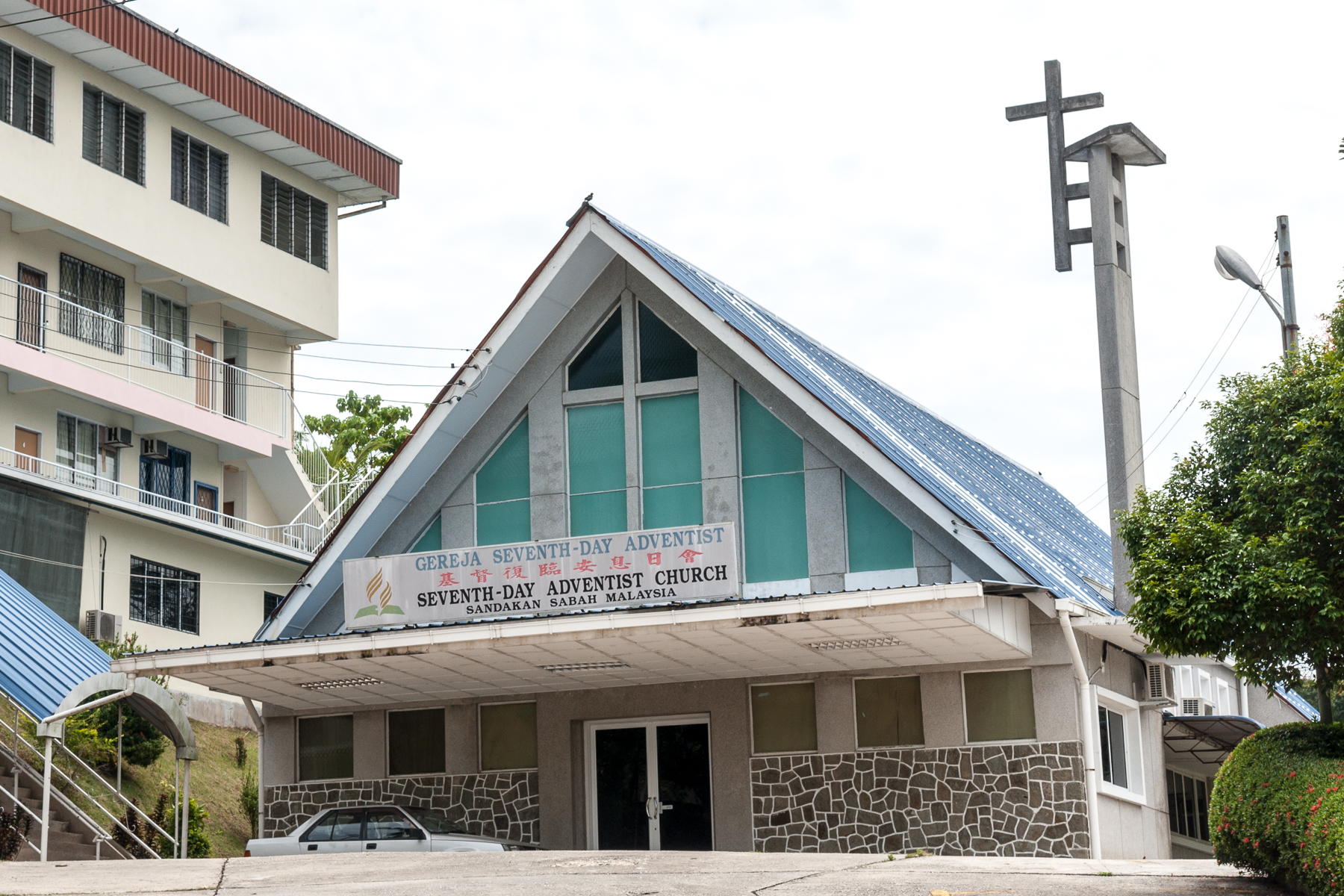
Sandakan Seventh Day Adventist Church.

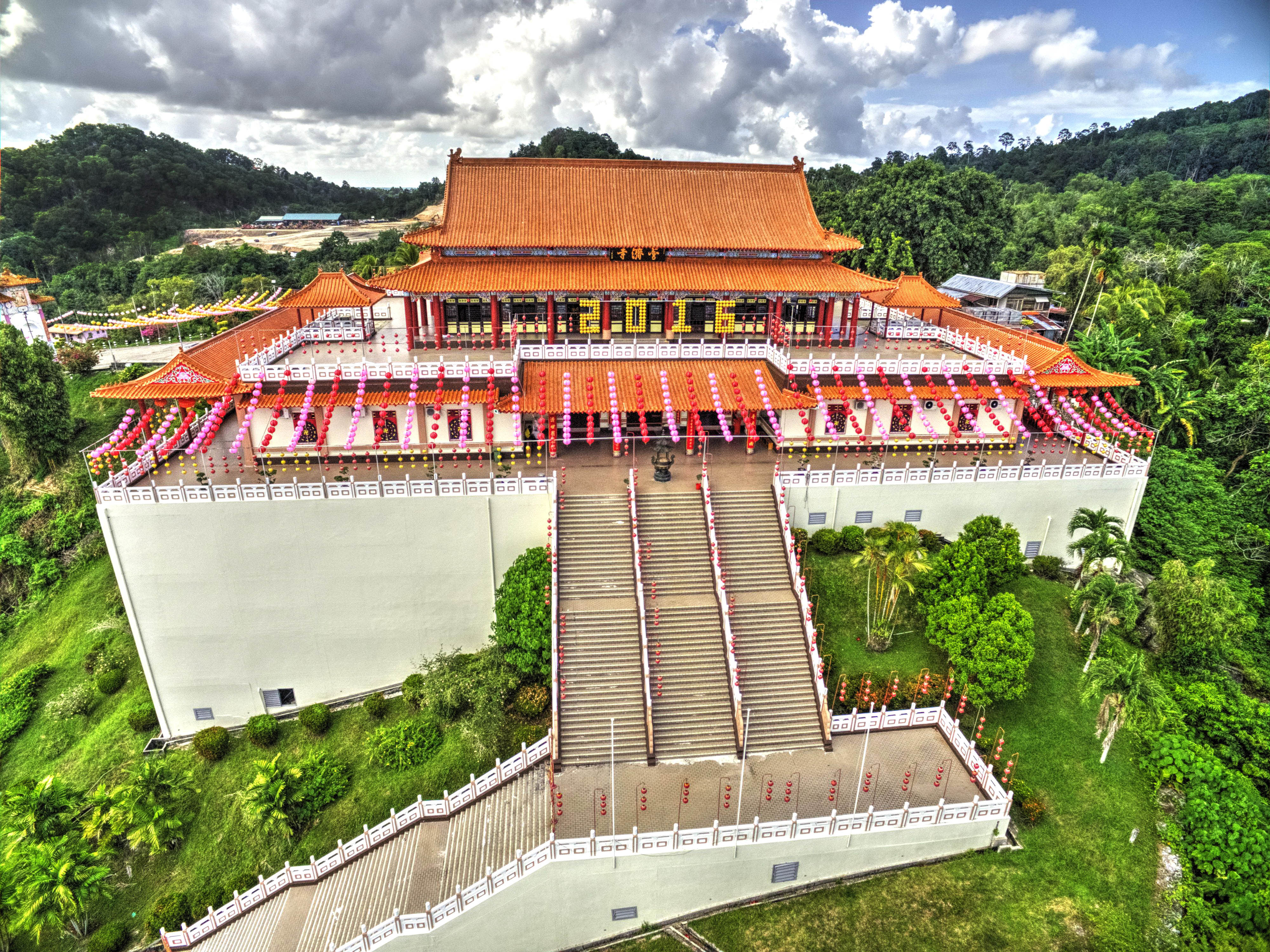
Puu Jih Shih Temple.

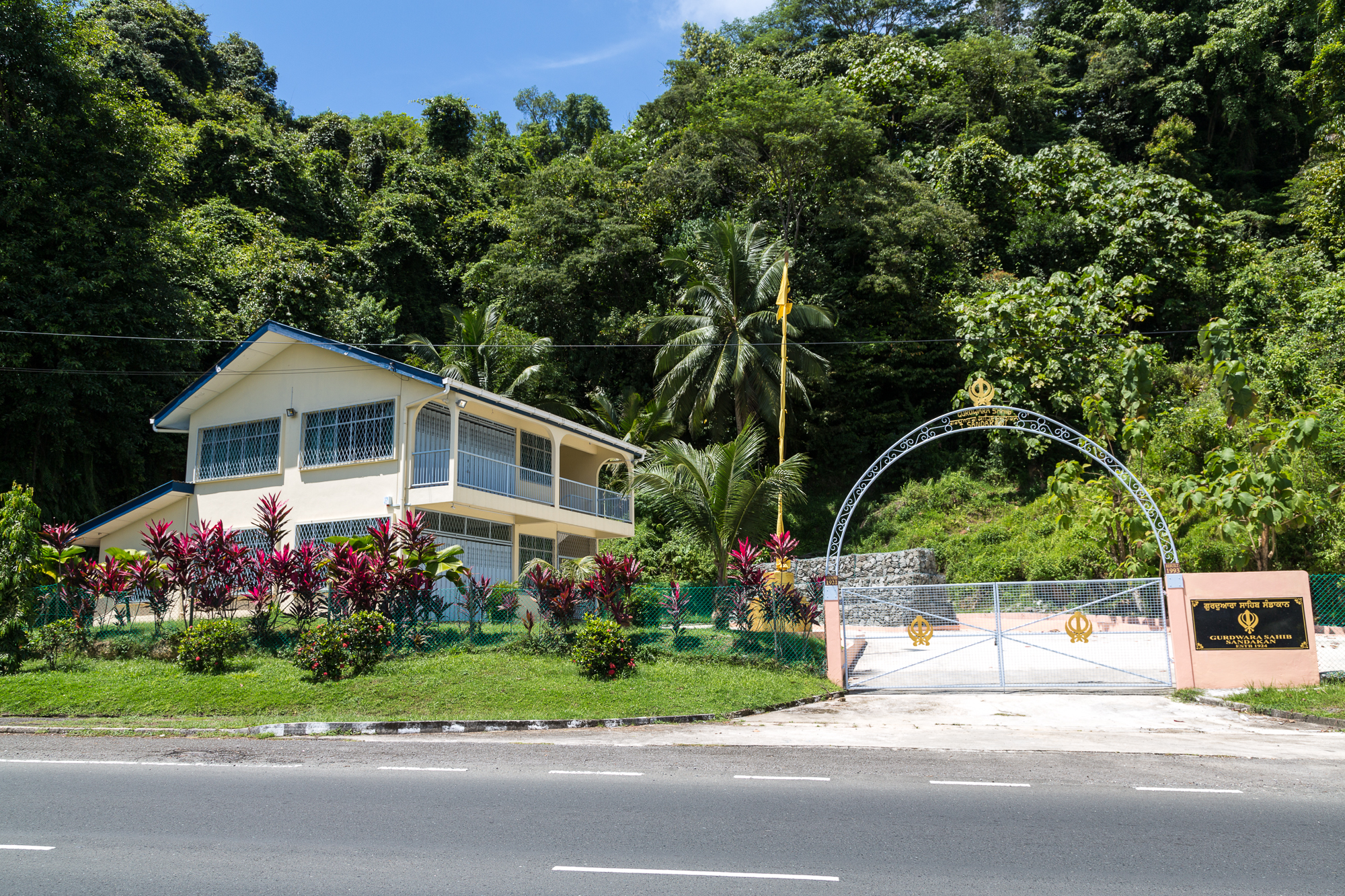
Gurdwara Sahib Sandakan.

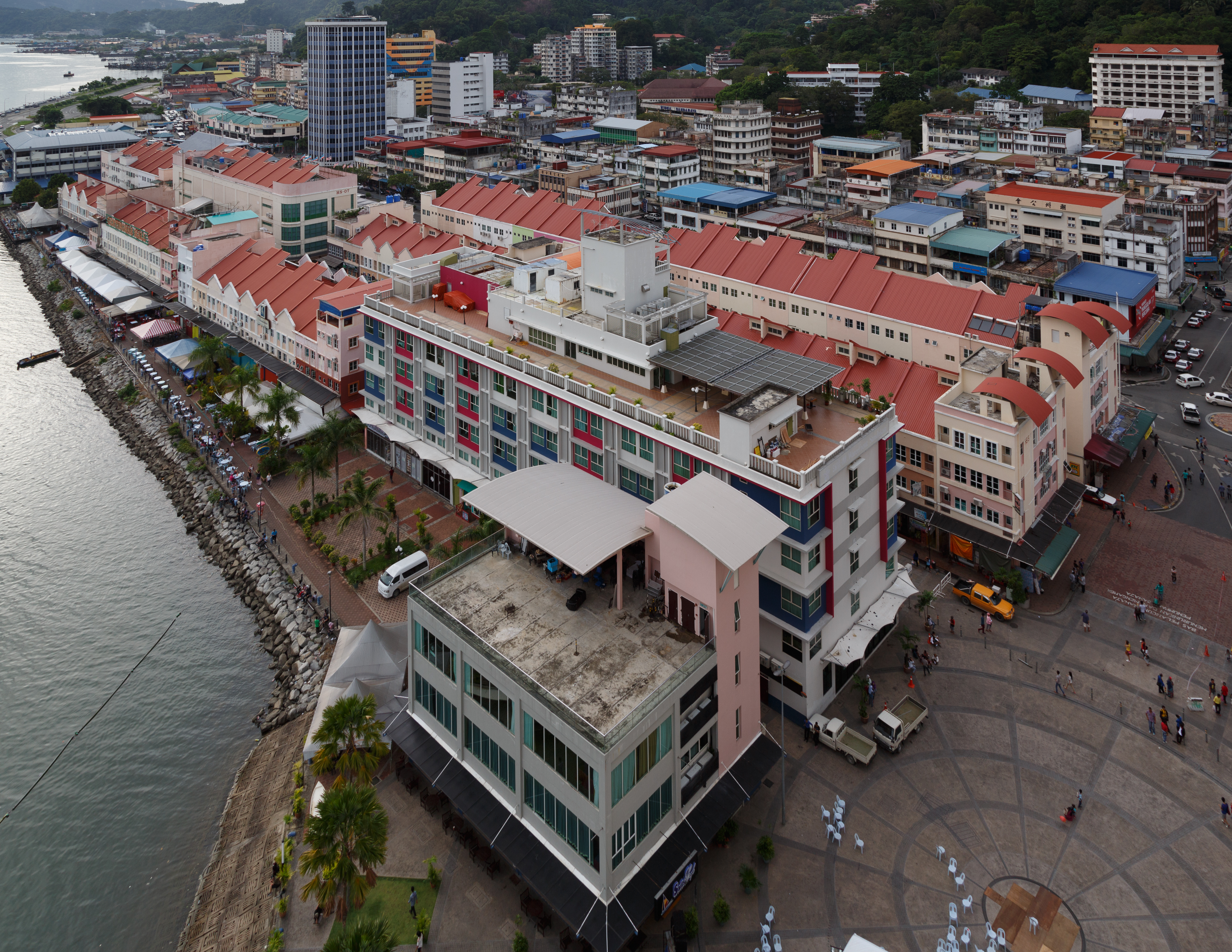
Sandakan city centre.

== See also ==
- Districts of Malaysia
