= Edmund Chong Ket Wah =

Malaysian politician

Yang Berbahagia Datuk Edmund Chong Ket Wah PGDK
- 蒋国华

Member of the Malaysian Parliament for Batu Sapi, Sabah
- In office 2004–2010
- Preceded by: New constituency
- Succeeded by: Linda Tsen Thau Lin

Personal details
- Born: Chong Ket Wah @ Chong Ket Fah; 9 April 1956 Sandakan, Crown Colony of North Borneo (now Sabah, Malaysia)
- Died: 9 October 2010 (aged 54) Kota Kinabalu, Sabah, Malaysia
- Citizenship: Malaysian
- Party: United Sabah Party
- Other political affiliations: Barisan Nasional
- Spouse: Linda Tsen Thau Lin
- Children: 1 son and 3 daughters
- Occupation: Politician

Edmund Chong Ket Wah (simplified Chinese: 蒋国华; traditional Chinese: 蔣國華; pinyin: Jiǎng Guóhuà; Pha̍k-fa-sṳ: Chióng Koet-fà) (9 April 1956 – 9 October 2010), born in Sandakan, Sabah was a Malaysian politician. He was the Member of the Parliament of Malaysia for the Batu Sapi constituency in Sabah, representing the United Sabah Party (PBS) in the governing Barisan Nasional (BN) coalition until his sudden death. He also held the post of treasurer-general and the Elopura division chief in PBS.

Chong was first elected to Parliament by winning the seat of Batu Sapi, a new seat that was created following a re-delineation exercise and was first contested in 2004 election unopposed after his opponent withdrew. Before entering federal parliament, he served on the municipal council of Sandakan. In the 2008 election, he retained his seat by defeating independent candidate Chung Kwong Wing with an overwhelming 3708 majority by polling 9479 votes.

He was a qualified Mechanical Engineer and a Consultant Engineer by profession. He was also the Sabah Commercial Vehicles Licensing Board chairman. He died at the age of 54 in a road accident when his 750cc motorcycle collided with a car along the Sembulan-Tanjung Aru road in Kota Kinabalu, Sabah, on 9 October 2010.

Chong's sudden demise had triggered the 2010 Batu Sapi by-election on 4 November 2010, the 13th by election after the 2008 Malaysian general election. His widow Datin Linda Tsen Thau Lin was chosen as BN candidate and successfully defended the seat he had held when he was alive.

== Election results ==
Parliament of Malaysia
| Year | Constituency | Candidate | Votes | Pct | Opponent(s) | Votes | Pct | Ballots cast | Majority | Turnout |
|---|---|---|---|---|---|---|---|---|---|---|
| 2004 | P185 Batu Sapi | Edmund Chong Ket Wah (PBS) | Unopposed | | | | | | | |
| 2008 | P185 Batu Sapi | Edmund Chong Ket Wah (PBS) | 9,479 | 62.16% | Chung Kwong Wing (IND) | 5,771 | 37.84% | 16,398 | 3,708 | 63.06% |

== Honours ==
=== Honours of Malaysia ===
- Sabah
  - Commander of the Order of Kinabalu (PGDK) – Datuk (2007)

== See also ==
- Politics of Malaysia
