= Tawau (federal constituency) =

Federal constituency of Sabah, Malaysia

Tawau (P190)
Sabah constituency

Federal constituency
- Legislature: Dewan Rakyat
- MP: Lo Su Fui; GRS
- Constituency created: 1966
- First contested: 1969
- Last contested: 2022

Demographics
- Population (2020): 230,531
- Electors (2025): 91,820
- Area (km²): 1,332
- Pop. density (per km²): 173.1

Tawau is a federal constituency in Tawau Division (Tawau District), Sabah, Malaysia, that has been represented in the Dewan Rakyat since 1971.

The federal constituency was created in the 1966 redistribution and is mandated to return a single member to the Dewan Rakyat under the first past the post voting system.

== Demographics ==
https://ge15.orientaldaily.com.my/seats/sabah/p

Ethnic breakdown of Tawau's electorate as of 2022
1. Malay-Muslim Bumiputera (44.6%)
2. Chinese (30.7%)
3. Sabah Bumiputera (16.5%)
4. Other ethnicities (8.30%)

As of 2020, Tawau has a population of 230,531 people.

== History ==
=== Polling districts ===
According to the gazette issued on 21 November 2025, the Tawau constituency has a total of 23 polling districts.

State constituency	Polling District	Code	Location
Balung (N67)	Kinabutan	190/67/01	SMK Kinabutan
Balung (N67)	Andrassy	190/67/02	SK Andrassy
Balung (N67)	Balung	190/67/03	SMK Balung
Balung (N67)	Kinabutan Besar	190/67/04	SMK Jalan Apas
Balung (N67)	Bukit Quoin	190/67/05	SK Bukit Quoin
Balung (N67)	Ranggau	190/67/06	SK Ranggau
Apas (N68)	Tawau Lama	190/68/01	SK Kampung Titingan
Apas (N68)	Tinagat	190/68/02	SK Batu Payung; SJK (C) Chung Hwa
Apas (N68)	Apas	190/68/03	SK Kuala Apas
Apas (N68)	Wakuba	190/68/04	SK Wakuba
Apas (N68)	Titingan	190/68/05	SK Titingan
Apas (N68)	Inderasabah	190/68/06	SK Inderasabah
Apas (N68)	Batu 4	190/68/07	SK Batu 4 Jalan Apas
Sri Tanjung (N69)	Kuhara	190/69/01	SMK Tawau
Sri Tanjung (N69)	Sing On	190/69/02	SJK (C) Hing Hwa
Sri Tanjung (N69)	Fajar	190/69/03	SK St. Ursula
Sri Tanjung (N69)	Sabindo	190/69/04	SMK Holy Trinity
Sri Tanjung (N69)	Kabota	190/69/05	SJK (C) Kung Ming
Sri Tanjung (N69)	Batu 3	190/69/06	SMK Taman Tawau
Sri Tanjung (N69)	Da Hwa	190/69/07	SMK Jambatan Putih
Sri Tanjung (N69)	Kapital	190/69/08	Kolej Tingkatan Enam Tawau
Sri Tanjung (N69)	Jalan Chester	190/69/09	SJK (C) Sin Hwa
Sri Tanjung (N69)	Takada	190/69/10	Sabah Chinese High School

=== Representation history ===
Members of Parliament for Tawau
Parliament	No	Years	Member	Party	Vote Share
Constituency created
		1969-1971	Parliament was suspended		
3rd	P120	1971-1973	Yeh Pao Tzu (叶宝滋)	SCA	4,987 73.80%
3rd	P120	1973-1974	Yeh Pao Tzu (叶宝滋)	BN (SCA)	4,987 73.80%
4th	P130	1974-1978	Alex Pang Sui Chee (彭瑞麒)	BN (SCA)	Uncontested
5th	P130	1978-1982	Hiew Nyuk Ying (丘玉荣)	BN (BERJAYA)	7,889; 54.82%
6th	P130	1982-1986	Kan Yau Fa (简耀华)	BN (BERJAYA)	10,525; 56.27%
7th	P151	1986-1990	Samson Chin Chee Tsu (陈志慈)	DAP	8,277; 46.62%
8th	P151	1990-1995	Geoffrey Yee Ling Fook (余伦福)	GR (PBS)	11,595; 50.93%
9th	P165	1995-1999	Chua Soon Bui (蔡顺梅)	BN (SAPP)	20,168; 59.67%
10th	P165	1999-2004	Shim Paw Fatt (沈宝发)	BN (SAPP)	20,160; 62.07%
11th	P190	2004–2008	Shim Paw Fatt (沈宝发)	BN (SAPP)	Uncontested
12th	P190	2008	Chua Soon Bui (蔡顺梅)	BN (SAPP)	13,943; 53.02%
12th	P190	2008-2013	Chua Soon Bui (蔡顺梅)	SAPP	13,943; 53.02%
13th	P190	2013-2018	Mary Yap Kain Ching (叶娟呈)	BN (PBS)	21,331; 54.88%
14th	P190	2018-2022	Christina Liew Chin Jin (刘静芝)	PH (PKR)	21,400; 50.05%
15th	P190	2022–present	Lo Su Fui (罗思辉)	GRS (PBS)	19,865; 39.19%

=== State constituency ===
Parliamentary constituency	State constituency					
Parliamentary constituency	1967–1974	1974–1985	1985–1995	1995–2004	2004–2020	2020–present
Tawau					Apas	
Tawau	Balung				Balung	
Tawau		Bandar Tawau				
Tawau				Kalabakan		
Tawau	Merotai					
Tawau			Sri Tanjong			

=== Historical boundaries ===
State Constituency	State constituency					
State Constituency	1966	1974	1984	1994	2003	2019
Apas					Apas; Inderasabah; Kampung Titingan; Tinagat; Wakuba	Apas; Inderasabah; Kampung Sri Aman; Kampung Titingan; Wakuba
Balung	Balung; Batu Payung; Kampung Titingan; Tawau; Tinagat	Balung; Batu Payung; Taman Sawit; Taman Semarak Merah; Tinagat			Bandar Sri Indah; Balung; Residensi Ranggu; Taman Sawit; Tinangat	Bandar Sri Indah; Kinabutan Tiku; Residensi Ranggu; Taman Sawit; Tinangat
Bandar Tawau		Jalan Tiku; Kampung Titingan; Pulau Sebatik; Pulau Traverse; Tawau				
Kalabakan				FELDA Umas; Kalabakan; Kampung Titingan; Pulau Sebatik; Tawau		
Merotai	Kalabakan; Kampung Airport Lama; Kampung Pasir Putih; Merotai; Pulau Sebatik	FELDA Umas; Kalabakan; Kampung Airport Lama; Kampung Pasir Putih; Merotai		Bukit Gemok; Kampung Pasir Putih; Merotai; Taman Capital; Taman Weld		
Sri Tanjong			Jalan Tiku; Kampung Titingan; Pulau Sebatik; Pulau Traverse; Tawau	Jalan Tiku; Kabota; Kampong Sri Aman; Sri Tanjong; Taman Megah Jaya	Jalan Tiku; Kampung Airport Lama; Sri Tanjong; Taman Mayflower; Tawau	Kabota; Sri Tanjong; Taman Mayflower; Taman Megah Jaya; Tawau

=== Current state assembly members ===
No.	State Constituency	Member	Coalition (Party)
N67	Balung	Syed Ahmad Syed Abas	GRS (GAGASAN)
N68	Apas	Nizam Abu Bakar Titingan	GRS (GAGASAN)
N69	Sri Tanjong	Justin Wong Yung Bin	WARISAN

=== Local governments & postcodes ===
No.	State Constituency	Local Government	Postcode
N67	Balung	Tawau Municipal Council	91000, 91039 Tawau
N68	Apas	Tawau Municipal Council	91000, 91039 Tawau
N69	Sri Tanjong	Tawau Municipal Council	91000, 91039 Tawau

== Election results ==
Malaysian general election, 2022
Party	Candidate	Votes	%	∆%
GRS	Lo Su Fui	19,865	39.19	▲39.19
PH	Christina Liew	16,065	31.69	▲31.69
Heritage	Chen Ket Chuin	11,263	22.22	▲22.22
Independent	Mohd Salleh Bacho	1,776	3.50	▲3.50
PEJUANG	Herman Amdas	1,067	2.11	▲2.11
Independent	Chin Chee Syn	651	1.28	▲1.28
Total valid votes		50,687	100.00	
Total rejected ballots		697		
Unreturned ballots		232		
Turnout		51,616	57.94	▼15.26
Registered electors		87,477		
Majority		3,800	7.50	▼3.56
GRS gain from PKR		Swing		?
Source(s) https://lom.agc.gov.my/ilims/upload/portal/akta/outputp/1753262/PUB619_2022.pdf

Malaysian general election, 2018
Party	Candidate	Votes	%	∆%
PKR	Christina Liew	21,400	50.05	▲7.98
BN	Yap Kain Ching @ Mary Yap Ken Jin	16,673	39.00	▼15.88
PAS	Mohamad Husain	2,518	5.89	▲5.89
Sabah People's Hope Party	Alizaman Jijurahman	2,162	5.06	▲5.06
Total valid votes		42,753	100.00	
Total rejected ballots		981		
Unreturned ballots		127		
Turnout		43,861	73.20	▼4.00
Registered electors		59,919		
Majority		4,727	11.06	▼1.75
PKR gain from BN		Swing		?
Source(s) "His Majesty's Government Gazette - Notice of Contested Election, Parliament for the State of Sabah [P.U. (B) 246/2018]" (PDF). Attorney General's Chambers of Malaysia. 3 May 2018. "Federal Government Gazette - Results of Contested Election and Statements of the Poll after the Official Addition of Votes, Parliamentary Constituencies for the State of Sabah [P.U. (B) 320/2018]" (PDF). Attorney General's Chambers of Malaysia. 28 May 2018. Archived from the original (PDF) on 2019-12-29.

Malaysian general election, 2013
Party	Candidate	Votes	%	∆%
BN	Yap Kain Ching @ Mary Yap Ken Jin	21,331	54.88	▲1.86
PKR	Kong Hong Ming @ Kong Fo Min	16,352	42.07	▲29.60
SAPP	Chua Soon Bui	633	1.63	▲1.63
Independent	Ahmad Awang @ Madon	553	1.42	▲1.42
Total valid votes		38,869	100.00	
Total rejected ballots		789		
Unreturned ballots		129		
Turnout		39,787	77.20	▲13.59
Registered electors		51,538		
Majority		4,979	12.81	▼5.70
BN hold		Swing		
Source(s) "Federal Government Gazette - Notice of Contested Election, Parliament for the State of Sabah [P.U. (B) 183/2013]" (PDF). Attorney General's Chambers of Malaysia. 26 April 2013. Archived from the original (PDF) on 2018-09-30. "Federal Government Gazette - Results of Contested Election and Statements of the Poll after the Official Addition of Votes, Parliamentary Constituencies for the State of Sabah [P.U. (B) 224/2013]" (PDF). Attorney General's Chambers of Malaysia. 22 May 2013. Archived from the original (PDF) on 2018-09-30.

Malaysian general election, 2008
Party	Candidate	Votes	%	∆%
BN	Chua Soon Bui	13,943	53.02	
DAP	Chan Foong Hin	9,076	34.51	
PKR	Berhan @ Birhan Ruslan	3,278	12.47	
Total valid votes		26,297	100.00	
Total rejected ballots		735		
Unreturned ballots		39		
Turnout		27,071	63.61	
Registered electors		42,560		
Majority		4,867	18.51	
BN hold		Swing		

Malaysian general election, 2004
Party	Candidate	Votes	%	∆%
On the nomination day, Shim Paw Fatt won uncontested.
BN	Shim Paw Fatt			
Total valid votes			100.00	
Total rejected ballots				
Unreturned ballots				
Turnout				
Registered electors		41,143		
Majority				
BN hold		Swing		

Malaysian general election, 1999
Party	Candidate	Votes	%	∆%
BN	Shim Paw Fatt	20,160	62.07	▲2.40
PBS	Kong Hong Ming @ Kong Fo Min	9,044	27.84	▼4.81
Independent	Majin Ajing	3,278	10.09	▲10.09
Total valid votes		32,482	100.00	
Total rejected ballots		240		
Unreturned ballots		530		
Turnout		33,252	55.18	▼7.73
Registered electors		60,260		
Majority		11,116	34.23	▲7.21
BN hold		Swing		

Malaysian general election, 1995
Party	Candidate	Votes	%	∆%
BN	Chua Soon Bui	20,168	59.67	▲59.67
PBS	Chee Yau Fah	11,037	32.65	▼18.28
DAP	Samson Chin Chee Tsu	1,401	4.14	▼1.36
PAS	Mohamed Tingka	825	2.44	▲0.57
Independent	Semanis Mohd Salleh	372	1.10	▲1.10
Total valid votes		33,803	100.00	
Total rejected ballots		302		
Unreturned ballots		204		
Turnout		34,309	62.91	▲2.48
Registered electors		54,536		
Majority		9,131	27.02	▲0.27
BN gain from PBS		Swing		?

Malaysian general election, 1990
Party	Candidate	Votes	%	∆%
PBS	Geoffrey Yee Ling Fook	11,595	50.93	▲50.93
Independent	Osman Mohamad	5,504	24.18	▲24.18
Independent	Bandy Pilo @ Sabandy	3,258	14.31	▲14.31
DAP	Samson Chin Chee Tsu	1,253	5.50	▼41.12
Independent	Ismail Senang	731	3.21	▲3.21
PAS	Mohamed Husain	426	1.87	▲1.87
Total valid votes		22,767	100.00	
Total rejected ballots		126		
Unreturned ballots		0		
Turnout		22,893	60.43	▼2.69
Registered electors		37,386		
Majority		6,091	26.75	▲7.25
PBS gain from DAP		Swing		?

Malaysian general election, 1986
Party	Candidate	Votes	%	∆%
DAP	Samson Chin Chee Tsu	8,277	46.62	▲46.62
BN	Christina Liew	4,814	27.12	▼29.15
Independent	Abdul Ghapur Salleh	4,663	26.26	▲26.26
Total valid votes		17,754	100.00	
Total rejected ballots		169		
Unreturned ballots		0		
Turnout		17,923	63.12	▼3.64
Registered electors		28,395		
Majority		3,463	19.50	▲3.82
DAP gain from BN		Swing		?

Malaysian general election, 1982
Party	Candidate	Votes	%	∆%
BN	Tan Yau Fah @ Paul	10,525	56.27	▲1.45
SCCP	Steven Chan Tze Hung	7,592	40.59	▲40.59
Independent	Ismail Mohamed Said	426	2.28	▲2.28
Independent	Ibrahim Kamaruddin	161	0.86	▲0.86
Total valid votes		18,704	100.00	
Total rejected ballots		243		
Unreturned ballots		0		
Turnout		18,947	66.76	▼2.75
Registered electors		28,381		
Majority		2,933	15.68	▼19.68
BN hold		Swing		

Malaysian general election, 1978
Party	Candidate	Votes	%	∆%
BN	Hiew Nyuk Ying	7,889	54.82	
DAP	Liew Kong Khai	2,800	19.46	
Independent	Ibrahim Kamaruddin	2,773	19.27	
SCA	Hiew Kim Siong	929	6.46	
Total valid votes		14,391	100.00	
Total rejected ballots		193		
Unreturned ballots		0		
Turnout		14,584	69.51	
Registered electors		20,978		
Majority		5,089	35.36	
BN hold		Swing		

Malaysian general election, 1974
Party	Candidate	Votes	%	∆%
On the nomination day, Alex Pang Sui Chee won uncontested.
BN	Alex Pang Sui Chee			
Total valid votes			100.00	
Total rejected ballots				
Unreturned ballots				
Turnout				
Registered electors		13,735		
Majority				
BN gain from SCA		Swing		?

Malaysian general election, 1969
Party	Candidate	Votes	%
SCA	Yeh Pao Tzu	4,987	73.80
Independent	Stephen Chan Tze Hung	1,770	36.20
Total valid votes		6,757	100.00
Total rejected ballots		155	
Unreturned ballots			
Turnout		6,912	70.50
Registered electors		9,798	
Majority		3,217	37.60
This was a new constituency created.
