= Calvin Chong Ket Kiun =

Malaysian politician

Yang Berhormat Tuan Calvin Chong Ket Kiun ASDK MLA
- 张克骏

Member of the Sabah State Legislative Assembly for Elopura
- Incumbent
- Assumed office 9 May 2018
- Preceded by: Au Kam Wah (BN–GERAKAN)
- Majority: 6,647 (2018); 7,683 (2020); 3,375 (2025)

Personal details
- Born: 18 January 1977 (age 49)
- Party: Democratic Action Party (DAP) (–2022); Heritage Party (WARISAN) (2022–)
- Other political affiliations: Pakatan Harapan (PH) (–2022)
- Spouse: Pang Pit San

Calvin Chong Ket Kiun is a Malaysian politician who has served as Member of the Sabah State Legislative Assembly (MLA) for Elopura since May 2018. He is a member of Heritage Party (WARISAN) and was formerly a member of the Democratic Action Party (DAP), a component party of the Pakatan Harapan (PH) coalition.

On 20 January 2022, Calvin, along with Sri Tanjong assemblyman Justin Wong Yung Bin and former senator Adrian Lasimbang quit DAP. Chong and Wong subsequently joined WARISAN on 26 March.

== Election results ==
Sabah State Legislative Assembly
Year	Constituency	Candidate	Votes	Pct	Opponent(s)	Votes	Pct	Ballots cast	Majority	Turnout
2018	N45 Elopura	Calvin Chong Ket Kiun (DAP)	12,219	68.68%	Chan Tzun Hei (Gerakan)	5,572	31.32%	18,047	6,647	71.37%
2020	N55 Elopura	Calvin Chong Ket Kiun (WARISAN)	10,871	73.61%	Chan Boon Thian (MCA)	3,188	21.59%	14,999	7,683	58.15%
2020	N55 Elopura	Calvin Chong Ket Kiun (WARISAN)	10,871	73.61%	Chong Thien Ming (LDP)	226	1.53%	14,999	7,683	58.15%
2020	N55 Elopura	Calvin Chong Ket Kiun (WARISAN)	10,871	73.61%	Siti Khairiah S. Mohd (USNO (New))	224	1.52%	14,999	7,683	58.15%
2020	N55 Elopura	Calvin Chong Ket Kiun (WARISAN)	10,871	73.61%	Voo Min Gin (PCS)	167	1.13%	14,999	7,683	58.15%
2020	N55 Elopura	Calvin Chong Ket Kiun (WARISAN)	10,871	73.61%	Pak Andi @ Mohd Saini (PPRS)	93	0.63%	14,999	7,683	58.15%
2025	N55 Elopura	Calvin Chong Ket Kiun (WARISAN)	8,603	45.07%	Vivian Wong Shir Yee (DAP)	5,228	27.39%	19,089	3,375	48.94%
2025	N55 Elopura	Calvin Chong Ket Kiun (WARISAN)	8,603	45.07%	Liau Fui Fui (KDM)	3,211	16.82%	19,089	3,375	48.94%
2025	N55 Elopura	Calvin Chong Ket Kiun (WARISAN)	8,603	45.07%	Mohd Firdaus Silvester Abdullah (Gerakan)	867	4.54%	19,089	3,375	48.94%
2025	N55 Elopura	Calvin Chong Ket Kiun (WARISAN)	8,603	45.07%	Jeffrey Chung Cheong Yung (IMPIAN)	848	4.44%	19,089	3,375	48.94%
2025	N55 Elopura	Calvin Chong Ket Kiun (WARISAN)	8,603	45.07%	Lita Tan Abdullah (IND)	251	1.31%	19,089	3,375	48.94%
2025	N55 Elopura	Calvin Chong Ket Kiun (WARISAN)	8,603	45.07%	Wong Hon Kong (PPRS)	81	0.42%	19,089	3,375	48.94%

== Honours ==
- Sabah
  - Companion of the Order of Kinabalu (ASDK) (2018)
