= Jimmy Wong Sze Phin =

Malaysian politician

Yang Berbahagia Datuk Jimmy Wong Sze Phin PGDK
- 黄仕平

State Assistant Minister to the Chief Minister of Sabah
- In office 16 May 2018 – 29 September 2020 Serving with Arifin Asgali
- Governor: Juhar Mahiruddin
- Chief Minister: Shafie Apdal
- Preceded by: Edward Yong Oui Fah; Ellron Alfred Angin
- Succeeded by: Abidin Madingkir
- Constituency: Sri Tanjong

State Chairman of the Democratic Action Party of Sabah
- In office 2010 – 29 November 2015
- Deputy: Stephen Wong Tien Fatt
- Secretary-General: Lim Guan Eng
- National Chairman: Karpal Singh (2010–2014); Tan Kok Wai (2014–2015)
- Succeeded by: Stephen Wong Tien Fatt

Member of the Sabah State Legislative Assembly for Sri Tanjong
- In office 9 May 2018 – 26 September 2020
- Preceded by: Chan Foong Hin (PR–DAP)
- Succeeded by: Justin Wong Yung Bin (PH–DAP)
- Majority: 9,383 (2018)

Member of the Malaysian Parliament for Kota Kinabalu
- In office 5 May 2013 – 9 May 2018
- Preceded by: Hiew King Cheu (PR–DAP)
- Succeeded by: Chan Foong Hin (PH–DAP)
- Majority: 18,959 (2013)

Personal details
- Born: Jimmy Wong Sze Phin; 1 March 1950 (age 76) Tawau, Crown Colony of North Borneo (now Sabah, Malaysia)
- Citizenship: Malaysian
- Party: Democratic Action Party (DAP) (2008–2021); Independent (since 2021)
- Other political affiliations: Pakatan Rakyat (PR) (2008–2015); Pakatan Harapan (PH) (2015–2021)
- Children: Justin Wong Yung Bin (son)
- Occupation: Politician

Datuk Jimmy Wong Sze Phin (simplified Chinese: 黄仕平; traditional Chinese: 黃仕平; pinyin: Huáng Shìpíng; born 1 March 1950) is a Malaysian politician who served as the State Assistant Minister to the Chief Minister of Sabah in the Heritage Party (WARISAN) administration under former Chief Minister Shafie Apdal from May 2018 to the collapse of the WARISAN administration in September 2020 and Member of the Sabah State Legislative Assembly (MLA) for Sri Tanjong also from May 2018 to September 2020. He also served as the Member of Parliament (MP) for Kota Kinabalu from May 2013 to May 2018. He is an independent and was a member of the Democratic Action Party (DAP), a component party of the Pakatan Harapan (PH) and formerly Pakatan Rakyat (PR) coalitions. He served as the State Chairman of DAP of Sabah from 2010 to November 2015 and Member of the Central Executive Committee (CEC) of DAP. He is also the father of Sri Tanjong MLA Justin Wong Yung Bin who defended the state seat after him in the 2020 state election.

== Election results ==
Parliament of Malaysia
Year	Constituency	Candidate	Votes	Pct	Opponent(s)	Votes	Pct	Ballot casts	Majority	Turnout
2013	P172 Kota Kinabalu	Jimmy Wong Sze Phin (DAP)	28,516	73.15%	Chin Tek Ming (PBS)	9,557	24.52%	39,548	18,959	78.29%
2013	P172 Kota Kinabalu	Jimmy Wong Sze Phin (DAP)	28,516	73.15%	Liew Hock Leong (STAR)	909	2.33%	39,548	18,959	78.29%

Sabah State Legislative Assembly
Year	Constituency	Candidate	Votes	Pct	Opponent(s)	Votes	Pct	Ballots cast	Majority	Turnout
2018	N57 Sri Tanjong	Jimmy Wong Sze Phin (DAP)	13,673	70.65%	Lo Su Fui (PBS)	4,290	22.17%	18,990	9,383	73.30%
2018	N57 Sri Tanjong	Jimmy Wong Sze Phin (DAP)	13,673	70.65%	Pang Thou Chung (PHRS)	873	4.51%	18,990	9,383	73.30%
2018	N57 Sri Tanjong	Jimmy Wong Sze Phin (DAP)	13,673	70.65%	Leong Yun Fui (PKS)	154	0.80%	18,990	9,383	73.30%

== Honours ==
- Sabah
  - Commander of the Order of Kinabalu (PGDK) – Datuk (2018)
