= Justin Wong Yung Bin =

Malaysian politician

Yang Berhormat Tuan Justin Wong Yung Bin
- 黄勇斌

Member of the 17th Sabah State Legislative Assembly for Sri Tanjong (N69)
- Incumbent
- Assumed office 11 December 2025
- Majority: 3,113 (2025)

Member of the 16th Sabah State Legislative Assembly for Sri Tanjong (N69)
- In office 26 September 2020 – 6 October 2025
- Preceded by: Jimmy Wong Sze Phin
- Majority: 8,880 (2020)

Personal details
- Born: Tawau, Sabah
- Party: Heritage Party (since 2022); Democratic Action Party (until 2022)
- Other political affiliations: Pakatan Harapan (PH) (until 2022)
- Parent: Jimmy Wong Sze Phin (father)
- Occupation: Politician

Justin Wong Yung Bin (Chinese: 黄勇斌; pinyin: Huáng Yǒng Bīn) is a Malaysian politician from the state of Sabah and also an assemblyman representing the seat of Sri Tanjong from the Sabah Heritage Party (WARISAN).

== Political career ==
=== 2020 Sabah state election ===
In September 2020, Wong was selected as the Democratic Action Party (DAP) candidate for Sri Tanjong under the "Warisan Plus" electoral alliance. During the election campaign, Wong's team increased its use of social media platforms, including Facebook and Instagram, in response to rising COVID-19 cases in Tawau.

Wong subsequently won the Sri Tanjong seat in the 2020 Sabah state election, receiving 11,150 votes and defeating his nearest opponent, Fung Len Fui of STAR, by a majority of 8,880 votes.

=== Departure from DAP and joining WARISAN ===
On 20 January 2022, Wong announced his resignation from DAP alongside Elopura assemblyman Calvin Chong Ket Kiun and former senator Adrian Lasimbang. In a joint statement, the three cited a loss of confidence in the party's Sabah leadership, internal divisions and communication difficulties. Wong initially continued serving as an independent assemblyman.

On 26 March 2022, Wong and Chong submitted their membership applications to party president Shafie Apdal, formally joined the Heritage Party (WARISAN). Wong said that his decision to join a Sabah-based party was influenced by feedback from constituents and his dissatisfaction with DAP's internal divisions.

=== 2025 Sabah state election ===
Wong contested the 2025 Sabah state election as a WARISAN candidate, and retained the Sri Tanjong seat with 9,774 votes (52.59%), defeating DAP candidate Philip Yap Wui Lip by a majority of 3,113 votes.

Wong currently serves as WARISAN's deputy information chief.

== Election results ==
Sabah State Legislative Assembly
Year	Constituency	Candidate	Votes	Pct	Opponent(s)	Votes	Pct	Ballots cast	Majority	Turnout
2020	N69 Sri Tanjong	Justin Wong Yung Bin (DAP)	11,150	75.57%	Fung Len Fui (STAR)	2,270	15.39%	14,559	8,880	55.84%
2020	N69 Sri Tanjong	Justin Wong Yung Bin (DAP)	11,150	75.57%	Yapp Yin Hoau (PHRS)	568	3.85%	14,559	8,880	55.84%
2020	N69 Sri Tanjong	Justin Wong Yung Bin (DAP)	11,150	75.57%	Lim Ting Khai (LDP)	276	1.87%	14,559	8,880	55.84%
2020	N69 Sri Tanjong	Justin Wong Yung Bin (DAP)	11,150	75.57%	Wong Su Vui (GAGASAN)	117	0.79%	14,559	8,880	55.84%
2020	N69 Sri Tanjong	Justin Wong Yung Bin (DAP)	11,150	75.57%	Kour Ken-Keat (PCS)	80	0.54%	14,559	8,880	55.84%
2020	N69 Sri Tanjong	Justin Wong Yung Bin (DAP)	11,150	75.57%	Chung Yaw Vui (IND)	52	0.35%	14,559	8,880	55.84%
2020	N69 Sri Tanjong	Justin Wong Yung Bin (DAP)	11,150	75.57%	Ricky Pang Siau Chern (PPRS)	46	0.31%	14,559	8,880	55.84%
2025	N69 Sri Tanjong	Justin Wong Yung Bin (WARISAN)	9,774	52.59%	Philip Yap Wui Lip (DAP)	6,661	35.84%	18,584	3,113	49.79%
2025	N69 Sri Tanjong	Justin Wong Yung Bin (WARISAN)	9,774	52.59%	Fung Len Fui (STAR)	1,133	6.10%	18,584	3,113	49.79%
2025	N69 Sri Tanjong	Justin Wong Yung Bin (WARISAN)	9,774	52.59%	Joseph Mosusah (IMPIAN)	412	2.22%	18,584	3,113	49.79%
2025	N69 Sri Tanjong	Justin Wong Yung Bin (WARISAN)	9,774	52.59%	Wong Su Vui (IND)	306	1.65%	18,584	3,113	49.79%
2025	N69 Sri Tanjong	Justin Wong Yung Bin (WARISAN)	9,774	52.59%	Ricky Hong Chee Kiong (KDM)	298	1.60%	18,584	3,113	49.79%
