= Mary Yap =

Malaysian politician

Yang Berbahagia Datuk Mary Yap PGDK ASDK JP
- 叶娟呈
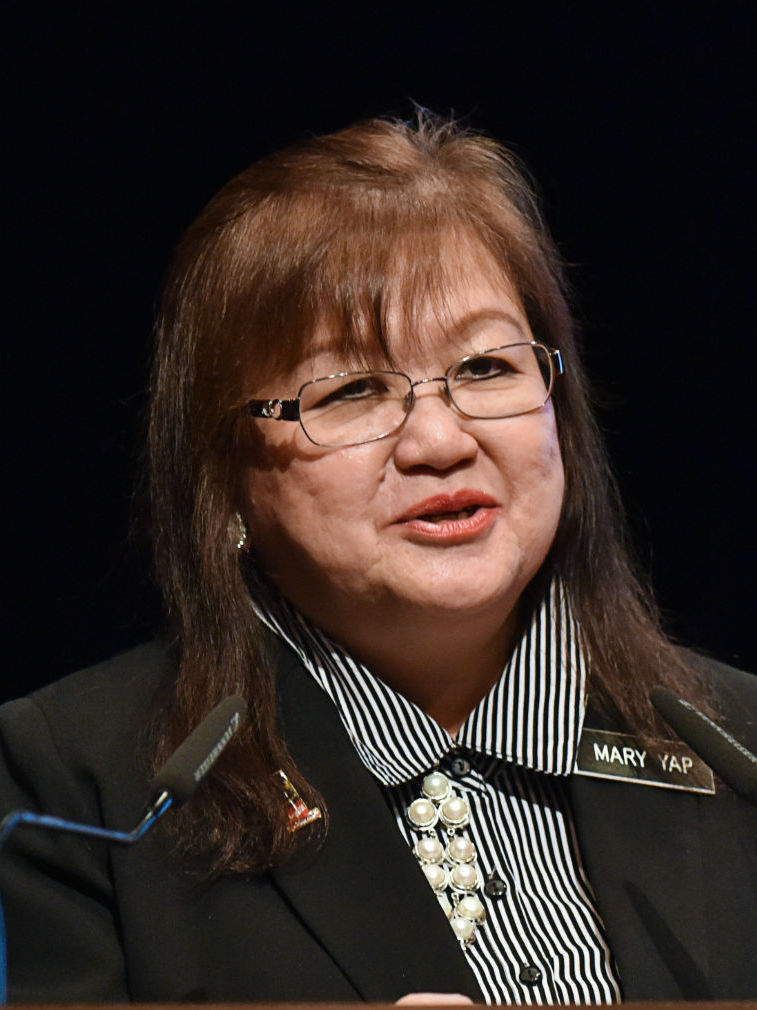

Deputy Minister of Higher Education
- In office 29 July 2015 – 9 May 2018
- Monarchs: Abdul Halim; Muhammad V
- Prime Minister: Najib Razak
- Minister: Idris Jusoh
- Preceded by: Herself as Deputy Minister of Education
- Succeeded by: Teo Nie Ching as Deputy Minister of Education
- Constituency: Tawau

Deputy Minister of Education II
- In office 16 May 2013 – 29 July 2015 Serving with Kamalanathan Panchanathan
- Monarch: Abdul Halim
- Prime Minister: Najib Razak
- Minister: Muhyiddin Yassin; Idris Jusoh
- Preceded by: Mohd Puad Zarkashi as Deputy Minister of Education; Saifuddin Abdullah as Deputy Minister of Higher Education
- Succeeded by: Herself (Higher Education); Chong Sin Woon (Education)
- Constituency: Tawau

Member of the Malaysian Parliament for Tawau
- In office 5 May 2013 – 9 May 2018
- Preceded by: Chua Soon Bui (SAPP)
- Succeeded by: Christina Liew (PKR–PH)
- Majority: 4,979 (2013)

Personal details
- Born: 10 March 1951 (age 75) Tawau, North Borneo (now Sabah, Malaysia)
- Citizenship: Malaysian
- Party: United Sabah Party (PBS) (2013–present)
- Other political affiliations: Barisan Nasional (BN); United Sabah Alliance
- Occupation: Politician

Mary Yap Kain Ching (Chinese: 叶娟呈; pinyin: Yè Juānchéng) is a Malaysian politician and the former Deputy Minister of Higher Education in the Cabinet of Malaysia. She is a member of United Sabah Party (PBS).

== Personal life ==
Mary was born on 10 March 1951 in Tawau, Crown Colony of North Borneo and spent most of her childhood there before being sent to Kota Kinabalu to live with relatives after Form 3 to continue her studies. She is a devout Christian of the Protestant tradition belonging to the Basel Christian Church of Malaysia denomination.

== Educational career ==
Mary started her career as a lecturer and teacher in the 1970s. She obtained a Bachelor of Arts in English Literature in 1974 from Universiti Malaya on a federal scholarship and a Diploma of Education from the same university the following year. In 1994, she completed her Master of Education (TESOL) from the University of Leeds, Britain. She was the principal of SM Teknik Tawau, a prestigious technical and vocational school in Tawau, Sabah, Malaysia when she retired in 2007. She was an advisor to the Minister of Education on the Cluster Schools of Excellence Movement from 2007 to 2009. The Southeast Asia Ministers of Education Organisation awarded her the second Lý Chánh Đức Award. She was appointed to the Women's Advisory Council for Sabah as a member and the chair of Education Committee in 2009. Along the same year, she was appointed to the PINTAR Foundation. In 2013, she completed her PhD program. From 2013 to 2015, she was the Deputy Minister of Education. Later she became the Deputy Minister of Higher Education for Malaysia from 2015 to 2018. On 10 November 2017, she opened the Magnetic Resonance Imaging (MRI) Research Centre of the National University of Malaysia.

== Political career ==
Prior to the 2013 general election, she contest the parliamentary seat in her hometown of Tawau and won, subsequently became a Member of Parliament for the town.

== Election results ==
Parliament of Malaysia
Year	Constituency	Candidate	Votes	Pct	Opponent(s)	Votes	Pct	Ballots cast	Majority	Turnout
2013	P190 Tawau	Yap Kain Ching (PBS)	21,331	54.88%	Kong Hong Min (PKR)	16,352	42.07%	39,787	4,979	77.20%
2013	P190 Tawau	Yap Kain Ching (PBS)	21,331	54.88%	Chua Soon Bui (SAPP)	633	1.63%	39,787	4,979	77.20%
2013	P190 Tawau	Yap Kain Ching (PBS)	21,331	54.88%	Ahmad Awang @ Madon (IND)	553	1.42%	39,787	4,979	77.20%
2018	P190 Tawau	Yap Kain Ching (PBS)	16,673	39.00%	Christina Liew Chin Jin (PKR)	21,400	50.05%	43,861	4,727	73.20%
2018	P190 Tawau	Yap Kain Ching (PBS)	16,673	39.00%	Mohamad Husain (PAS)	2,518	5.89%	43,861	4,727	73.20%
2018	P190 Tawau	Yap Kain Ching (PBS)	16,673	39.00%	Alizaman Jijurahman (PHRS)	2,162	5.06%	43,861	4,727	73.20%

== Honours ==
- Sabah
  - Commander of the Order of Kinabalu (PGDK) – Datuk (2008)
  - Commander of the Order of Kinabalu (ASDK) (2002)
  - Justice of the Peace (JP) (2005)
