= Chua Soon Bui =

Malaysian politician (born 1955)

Yang Berbahagia Datuk Chua Soon Bui PGDK
- 蔡顺梅

Member of the Malaysian Parliament for Tawau, Sabah
- In office 2008–2013
- Preceded by: Shim Paw Fatt
- Succeeded by: Mary Yap Kain Ching

Personal details
- Born: 1 February 1955 (age 71) North Borneo (now Sabah, Malaysia)
- Party: Sabah Progressive Party
- Occupation: Politician

Chua Soon Bui (simplified Chinese: 蔡顺梅; traditional Chinese: 蔡順梅; pinyin: Cài Shùnméi; born 1 February 1955) was the Member of the Parliament of Malaysia for the Tawau constituency in Sabah from 2008 to 2013. She sat in Parliament as a member of the Sabah Progressive Party (SAPP), which commenced the 2008–13 Parliament in the Barisan Nasional coalition but joined the crossbenches in 2008. Recontesting her seat in the 2013 election, she finished in third place with 633 votes.

== Election results ==
Parliament of Malaysia
Year	Constituency	Candidate	Votes	Pct	Opponent(s)	Votes	Pct	Ballots cast	Majority	Turnout
2008	P190 Tawau	Chua Soon Bui (SAPP)	13,943	53.02%	Chan Foong Hin (DAP)	9,076	34.51%	27,071	4,867	63.61%
2008	P190 Tawau	Chua Soon Bui (SAPP)	13,943	53.02%	Berhan @ Birhan Ruslan (PKR)	3,278	12.47%	27,071	4,867	63.61%
2013	P190 Tawau	Chua Soon Bui (SAPP)	633	1.63%	Yap Kain Ching (PBS)	21,331	54.88%	39,787	4,979	77.20%
2013	P190 Tawau	Chua Soon Bui (SAPP)	633	1.63%	Kong Hong Min (PKR)	16,352	42.07%	39,787	4,979	77.20%
2013	P190 Tawau	Chua Soon Bui (SAPP)	633	1.63%	Ahmad Awang @ Madon (IND)	553	1.42%	39,787	4,979	77.20%

== Honours ==
- Sabah
  - Commander of the Order of Kinabalu (PGDK) – Datuk (2004)
