= Chan Foong Hin =

Malaysian politician and chemical engineer

Yang Berhormat Datuk Chan Foong Hin PGDK ASDK MP
- 陈泓缣
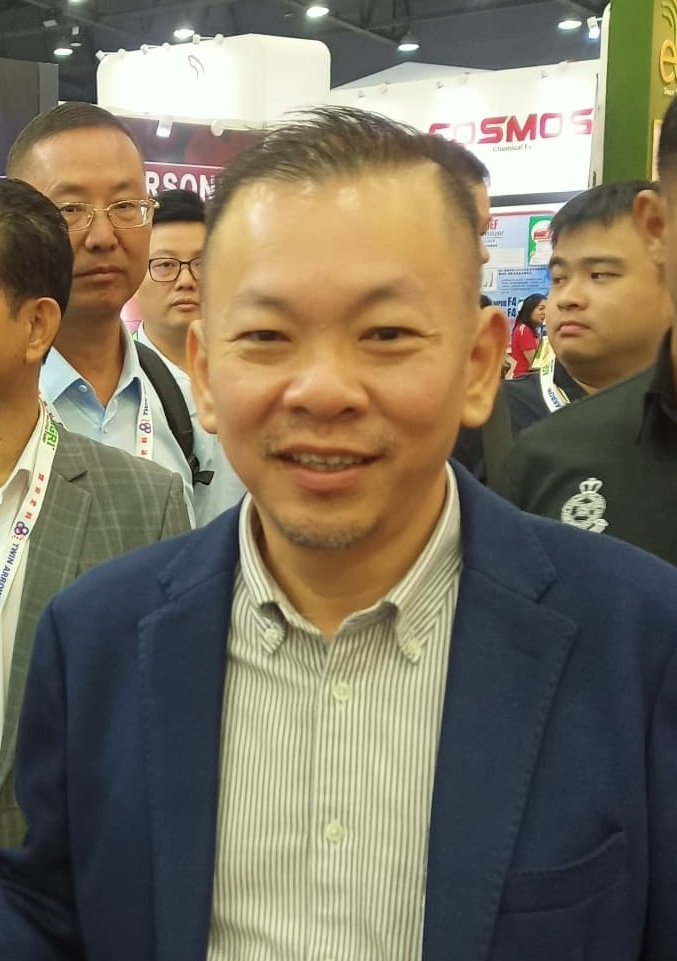
- Chan Foong Hin in 2024

Deputy Minister of Agriculture and Food Security
- Incumbent
- Assumed office 17 December 2025
- Monarch: Ibrahim Iskandar
- Prime Minister: Anwar Ibrahim
- Minister: Mohamad Sabu
- Preceded by: Arthur Joseph Kurup
- Constituency: Kota Kinabalu
- In office 10 December 2022 – 12 December 2023
- Monarch: Abdullah
- Prime Minister: Anwar Ibrahim
- Minister: Mohamad Sabu
- Preceded by: Ahmad Hamzah (Deputy Minister of Agriculture and Food Industries I); Nik Muhammad Zawawi Salleh (Deputy Minister of Agriculture and Food Industries II)
- Succeeded by: Arthur Joseph Kurup
- Constituency: Kota Kinabalu

Deputy Minister of Plantation and Commodities
- In office 12 December 2023 – 17 December 2025
- Monarchs: Abdullah (2023–2024); Ibrahim Iskandar (since 2024)
- Prime Minister: Anwar Ibrahim
- Minister: Johari Abdul Ghani
- Preceded by: Siti Aminah Aching
- Succeeded by: Huang Tiong Sii
- Constituency: Kota Kinabalu

National Policy Director of the Democratic Action Party
- Incumbent
- Assumed office 16 March 2025
- Secretary-General: Anthony Loke Siew Fook
- Preceded by: Position established

State Deputy Chairman of the Democratic Action Party of Sabah
- Incumbent
- Assumed office 27 October 2024
- Secretary-General: Anthony Loke Siew Fook
- State Chairman: Phoong Jin Zhe
- Preceded by: Peter Dhoms Saili

Member of the Malaysian Parliament for Kota Kinabalu
- Incumbent
- Assumed office 9 May 2018
- Preceded by: Jimmy Wong Sze Phin (PH–DAP)
- Majority: 24,086 (2018); 23,783 (2022)

Member of the Sabah State Legislative Assembly for Sri Tanjong
- In office 5 May 2013 – 9 May 2018
- Preceded by: Jimmy Wong Sze Phin (PR–DAP)
- Succeeded by: Jimmy Wong Sze Phin (PH–DAP)
- Majority: 5,927 (2013)

Personal details
- Born: Chan Foong Hin; 25 December 1978 (age 47) Tawau, Sabah, Malaysia
- Citizenship: Malaysian
- Party: Democratic Action Party (DAP) (since 2008)
- Other political affiliations: Pakatan Rakyat (PR) (2008–2015); Pakatan Harapan (PH) (since 2015)
- Spouse: Koh Chen Yean
- Education: University of Malaya
- Occupation: Politician
- Profession: Chemical engineer
- Chan Foong Hin on Parliament of Malaysia

Chan Foong Hin (simplified Chinese: 陈泓缣; traditional Chinese: 陳泓縑; pinyin: Chén Hóngjiān; Pha̍k-fa-sṳ: Chhìn Fên-kiâm; born 25 December 1978) is a Malaysian politician and chemical engineer who has served as the Deputy Minister of Plantation and Commodities in the Unity Government administration under Prime Minister Anwar Ibrahim and Minister Johari Abdul Ghani from December 2023 to December 2025 and the Member of Parliament (MP) for Kota Kinabalu since May 2018. He previously served as the Deputy Minister of Agriculture and Food Security prior to the 2023 cabinet reshuffle under Minister Mohamad Sabu from December 2022 to December 2023 and again since December 2025 as well as formerly a member of the Sabah State Legislative Assembly (MLA) for Sri Tanjong from May 2013 to May 2018. He is a member of the Democratic Action Party (DAP), a component party of the Pakatan Harapan (PH) coalition. He has also served as the National Policy Director of DAP since March 2025 and State Deputy Chairman of DAP of Sabah since October 2024.

== Election ==
=== 2018 general election ===
In the 2018 election, Democratic Action Party (DAP) fielded Chan to defend the Kota Kinabalu parliamentary seat, facing Joseph Lee Han Kyun from the United Sabah Party (PBS), who was a former DAP candidate. Chan subsequently won with a large majority.

== Election results ==
Parliament of Malaysia
Year	Constituency	Candidate	Votes	Pct	Opponent(s)	Votes	Pct	Ballots Cast	Majority	Turnout
2008	P190 Tawau	Chan Foong Hin (DAP)	9,076	34.51%	Chua Soon Bui (SAPP)	13,943	53.02%	27,071	4,867	63.61%
2008	P190 Tawau	Chan Foong Hin (DAP)	9,076	34.51%	Berhan @ Birhan Ruslan (PKR)	3,278	12.47%	27,071	4,867	63.61%
2018	P172 Kota Kinabalu	Chan Foong Hin (DAP)	31,632	74.76%	Joseph Lee Han Kyun (PBS)	7,546	17.84%	42,873	24,086	76.26%
2018	P172 Kota Kinabalu	Chan Foong Hin (DAP)	31,632	74.76%	Yong Teck Lee (SAPP)	3,132	7.40%	42,873	24,086	76.26%
2022	P172 Kota Kinabalu	Chan Foong Hin (DAP)	31,359	71.08%	Amanda Yeo Yan Yin (WARISAN)	7,576	17.17%	44,663	23,783	59.57%
2022	P172 Kota Kinabalu	Chan Foong Hin (DAP)	31,359	71.08%	Yee Tsai Yiew (PBS)	4,592	10.41%	44,663	23,783	59.57%
2022	P172 Kota Kinabalu	Chan Foong Hin (DAP)	31,359	71.08%	Winston Liaw Kit Siong (KDM)	456	1.03%	44,663	23,783	59.57%
2022	P172 Kota Kinabalu	Chan Foong Hin (DAP)	31,359	71.08%	Marcel Jude (IND)	137	0.31%	44,663	23,783	59.57%

Sabah State Legislative Assembly
Year	Constituency	Candidate	Votes	Pct	Opponent(s)	Votes	Pct	Ballots cast	Majority	Turnout
2013	N69 Sri Tanjong	Chan Foong Hin (DAP)	10,948	65.90%	Fung Len Fui (PBS)	5,021	30.23%	16,357	5,927	74.91%
2013	N69 Sri Tanjong	Chan Foong Hin (DAP)	10,948	65.90%	Yong Ah Poh (SAPP)	260	1.57%	16,357	5,927	74.91%
2013	N69 Sri Tanjong	Chan Foong Hin (DAP)	10,948	65.90%	Olivia Chong Oi Yun (STAR)	128	0.77%	16,357	5,927	74.91%
2025	N22 Tanjung Aru	Chan Foong Hin (DAP)			Wong Hong Jun (WARISAN)					
2025	N22 Tanjung Aru	Chan Foong Hin (DAP)			Suhaimi Buang (BERSATU)					
2025	N22 Tanjung Aru	Chan Foong Hin (DAP)			Hiew Choon Yu (STAR)					
2025	N22 Tanjung Aru	Chan Foong Hin (DAP)			Dennison Indang (UPKO)					
2025	N22 Tanjung Aru	Chan Foong Hin (DAP)			Yee Wee Ping (IMPIAN)					
2025	N22 Tanjung Aru	Chan Foong Hin (DAP)			Wong Cheng Chee (ANAK NEGERI)					
2025	N22 Tanjung Aru	Chan Foong Hin (DAP)			Loh Ee Eng (PBK)					
2025	N22 Tanjung Aru	Chan Foong Hin (DAP)			Mohamed Zaim Ansawi (IND)					
2025	N22 Tanjung Aru	Chan Foong Hin (DAP)			Ritchie Jay Cheng (IND)					

== Honours ==
=== Honours of Malaysia ===
- Malaysia
  - Recipient of the 17th Yang di-Pertuan Agong Installation Medal
- Sabah
  - Commander of the Order of Kinabalu (PGDK) – Datuk (2023)
  - Companion of the Order of Kinabalu (ASDK) (2018)
