= St Cecilia's Convent Secondary School =

- Sandakan, Sabah; Malaysia

Information
- Type: Government Secondary School
- Motto: First Things First
- Religious affiliation: Roman Catholic
- Established: 1963 (as primary sch)
- Principal: Mr. Soo Tian Hock
- Grades: Forms 1–5
- Enrolment: 1560+

St Cecilia's Convent Secondary School (SCCSS), Malay: Sekolah Menengah Kebangsaan Konven St. Cecilia (SMK Konven St. Cecilia), is a secondary school in Sandakan, Sabah, Malaysia. Its Ministry of Education code is XFE2037.

Located within the newly formed Roman Catholic Diocese of Sandakan, SCCSS is situated at 4 kilometres (2.5 mi) from Sandakan. Nearby schools are SM St. Mary's (boys secondary school), SK St. Mary Town, SR St. Mary's Convent, SK St. Mary and SMJK Tiong Hua. It is also near to the Duchess of Kent General Hospital and the local Polyclinic. Students of St Cecilia's are known as "Cecilians". It is one of the 30 Convent secondary schools in Malaysia.

== History ==
St Cecilia's was founded in 1963 as a primary school under Rev Mother St. Leonard. It was one of a number of schools in Sabah staffed by the Sisters of the Little Company of Mary, also known as the "Blue Sisters". In 1966 it became the first girls' secondary school in Sandakan. The primary school was closed and its students transferred to SR St. Mary's Convent, one of St Cecilia's present-day feeder schools.
