= Elopura (state constituency) =

State constituency in Sabah, Malaysia

Elopura (N55)
Sabah constituency

State constituency
- Legislature: Sabah State Legislative Assembly
MLA
Calvin Chong Ket Kiun
Heritage
- Constituency created: 1967
- First contested: 1967
- Last contested: 2025

Demographics
- Electors (2025): 39,004

Elopura is a state constituency in Sabah, Malaysia, that is represented in the Sabah State Legislative Assembly. It is situated within the Sandakan Parliamentary constituency.

== Demographics ==
As of 2020, Elopura has a population of 101,443 people.

Ethnic breakdown of Elopura's electorate as of 2025
1. Chinese (44.0%)
2. Muslim Bumiputera (41.0%)
3. Non-Muslim Bumiputera (14.0%)
4. Other ethnicities (1.00%)

== History ==
=== Polling districts ===
According to the gazette issued on 31 October 2022, the Elopura constituency has a total of 10 polling districts.

State constituency	Polling District	Code	Location
Elopura (N55)	Taman Indah Jaya	186/55/01	SMK Muhibbah; SK Muhibbah
Elopura (N55)	Beatrice	186/55/02	SMK Konven St. Cecilia
Elopura (N55)	Batu 1 Jalan Utara	186/55/03	SJK (C) Chi Hwa
Elopura (N55)	Batu 2 Jalan Utara	186/55/04	SMK Sandakan
Elopura (N55)	Trig Hill	186/55/05	SM Sung Siew
Elopura (N55)	Jalan Utara	186/55/06	SM Yu Yuan
Elopura (N55)	Pecky Valley	186/55/07	SMK St. Mary Sandakan
Elopura (N55)	Sungai Anip	186/55/08	Tadika Chi Hwa
Elopura (N55)	Batu 3 Jalan Utara	186/55/09	SK St. Mary Town
Elopura (N55)	Batu 5 Jalan Utara	186/55/10	SK St. Monica

=== Representation history ===
Member of Sabah State Legislative Assembly for Elopura
Assembly	No	Years	Member	Party
Constituency created
3rd	N24	1967 – 1971	Yap Pak Leong (葉伯良)	Independent
4th	N24	1971 – 1973	Ngui Tet Min (魏德明)	Alliance (SCA)
4th	N24	1973 – 1976	Ngui Tet Loi (魏德來)	Alliance (SCA)
5th	N25	1976	Yap Pak Leong (葉伯良)	BERJAYA
5th	N25	1976 – 1981	Yap Pak Leong (葉伯良)	BN (BERJAYA)
6th	N25	1981 – 1985	Yap Pak Leong (葉伯良)	BN (BERJAYA)
7th	N18	1985 – 1986	Tham Nyip Shen (譚業成)	PBS
8th	N18	1986 – 1990	Tham Nyip Shen (譚業成)	PBS
9th	N18	1990 – 1994	Tham Nyip Shen (譚業成)	GR (PBS)
10th	N18	1994 – 1999	Tham Nyip Shen (譚業成)	BN (SAPP)
11th	N36	1999 – 2004	Tham Nyip Shen (譚業成)	BN (SAPP)
12th	N45	2004 – 2008	Au Kam Wah (歐錦華)	BN (GERAKAN)
13th	N45	2008 – 2013	Au Kam Wah (歐錦華)	BN (GERAKAN)
14th	N45	2013 – 2018	Au Kam Wah (歐錦華)	BN (GERAKAN)
15th	N45	2018 – 2020	Calvin Chong Ket Kiun (張克骏)	PH (DAP)
16th	N55	2020 – 2022	Calvin Chong Ket Kiun (張克骏)	PH (DAP)
16th	N55	2022	Calvin Chong Ket Kiun (張克骏)	Independent
16th	N55	2022 – 2025	Calvin Chong Ket Kiun (張克骏)	WARISAN
17th	N55	2025–present	Calvin Chong Ket Kiun (張克骏)	WARISAN

== Election results ==
Sabah state election, 2025
Party	Candidate	Votes	%	∆%
Heritage	Calvin Chong Ket Kiun	8,603	45.07	▼27.41
PH	Vivian Wong Shir Yee	5,228	27.39	▲27.39
KDM	Liau Fui Fui	3,211	16.82	▲16.82
PN	Mohd Firdaus Silvester Abdullah	867	4.54	▲4.54
Sabah Dream Party	Jeffrey Chung Cheong Yung	848	4.44	▲4.44
Independent	Lita Tan Abdullah	251	1.31	▲1.31
Sabah People's Unity Party	Wong Hon Kong	81	0.42	▲0.42
Total valid votes		19,089		
Total rejected ballots		310		
Unreturned ballots		45		
Turnout		19,444	49.85	▼8.30
Registered electors		39,004		
Majority		3,375	17.68	▼33.55
Heritage hold		Swing		
Source(s) "RESULTS OF CONTESTED ELECTION AND STATEMENTS OF THE POLL AFTER THE OFFICIAL ADDITION OF VOTES" (PDF).

Sabah state election, 2020
Party	Candidate	Votes	%	∆%
Sabah Heritage Party	Calvin Chong Ket Kiun	10,871	72.48	▲72.48
BN	Chan Boon Thian	3,188	21.25	▼9.53
LDP	Chong Thien Ming	226	1.51	▲1.51
USNO (Baru)	Siti Khairiah S. Mohd	224	1.49	▲1.49
Love Sabah Party	Voo Min Gin	167	1.11	▲1.11
Sabah People's Unity Party	Pak Andi @ Mohd Saini	93	0.62	▲0.62
Total valid votes		14,769	98.47	
Total rejected ballots		192	1.28	
Unreturned ballots		38	0.25	
Turnout		14,999	58.15	▼13.43
Registered electors		25,794		
Majority		7,683	51.23	▲14.50
Sabah Heritage Party hold		Swing		
Source(s) "RESULTS OF CONTESTED ELECTION AND STATEMENTS OF THE POLL AFTER THE OFFICIAL ADDITION OF VOTES".

Sabah state election, 2018
Party	Candidate	Votes	%	∆%
DAP	Calvin Chong Ket Kiun	12,219	67.51	▲20.56
BN	Chan Tzun Hei	5,572	30.78	▼17.67
Total valid votes		17,791	98.29	
Total rejected ballots		256	1.41	
Unreturned ballots		53	0.29	
Turnout		18,100	71.58	▼3.38
Registered electors		25,285		
Majority		6,647	36.73	▲35.23
DAP gain from BN		Swing		?
Source(s) "RESULTS OF CONTESTED ELECTION AND STATEMENTS OF THE POLL AFTER THE OFFICIAL ADDITION OF VOTES". Archived from the original on 2022-09-28.

Sabah state election, 2013
Party	Candidate	Votes	%	∆%
BN	Au Kam Wah	8,105	48.45	▼24.44
DAP	Hiew Vun Zin	7,854	46.95	▲46.95
SAPP	Liau Fook Kong	469	2.80	▲2.80
Total valid votes		16,428	98.20	
Total rejected ballots		281	1.68	
Unreturned ballots		20	0.12	
Turnout		16,729	74.96	▲15.79
Registered electors		22,317		
Majority		251	1.50	▼48.29
BN hold		Swing		
Source(s) "KEPUTUSAN PILIHAN RAYA UMUM DEWAN UNDANGAN NEGERI".

Sabah state election, 2008
Party	Candidate	Votes	%	∆%
BN	Au Kam Wah	7,919	72.89	▼5.08
PKR	Pang Chen Miew	2,510	23.10	▲23.10
Total valid votes		10,429	95.99	
Total rejected ballots		338	3.11	
Unreturned ballots		98	0.90	
Turnout		10,865	59.17	▲1.61
Registered electors		18,363		
Majority		5,409	49.79	▼17.42
BN hold		Swing		
Source(s) "KEPUTUSAN PILIHAN RAYA UMUM DEWAN UNDANGAN NEGERI SABAH BAGI TAHUN 2008".

Sabah state election, 2004
Party	Candidate	Votes	%	∆%
BN	Au Kam Wah	8,095	77.97	▲30.61
PASOK	Liew Teck Khen @ Liew Teck King	1,117	10.76	▲10.76
Independent	Mohd Amran Saidin	828	7.98	▲7.98
Total valid votes		10,040	96.71	
Total rejected ballots		290	2.79	
Unreturned ballots		52	0.50	
Turnout		10,382	57.56	▼11.13
Registered electors		18,036		
Majority		6,978	67.21	▲50.82
BN hold		Swing		
Source(s) "KEPUTUSAN PILIHAN RAYA UMUM DEWAN UNDANGAN NEGERI SABAH BAGI TAHUN 2004".

Sabah state election, 1999
Party	Candidate	Votes	%	∆%
BN	Tham Nyip Shen	5,577	47.36	▼2.01
PBS	Chong Ket Wah	3,647	30.97	▼9.55
BERSEKUTU	Chu Ying Kai @ Lawrence	2,070	17.58	▲17.58
SETIA	Mohd Amran Saidin	276	2.34	▲2.34
Independent	Ramli Wen	75	0.64	▲0.64
Total valid votes		11,645	98.89	
Total rejected ballots		131	1.11	
Unreturned ballots		0	0.00	
Turnout		11,776	68.69	▼0.01
Registered electors		17,144		
Majority		1,930	16.39	▲7.54
BN hold		Swing		
Source(s) "KEPUTUSAN PILIHAN RAYA UMUM DEWAN UNDANGAN NEGERI SABAH BAGI TAHUN 1999".

Sabah state election, 1994
Party	Candidate	Votes	%	∆%
BN	Tham Nyip Shen	4,854	49.37	▲31.87
PBS	Chong Ket Wah	3,984	40.52	▼20.71
DAP	Ang Lian Hai	871	8.86	▼1.17
Total valid votes		9,709	98.75	
Total rejected ballots		123	1.25	
Unreturned ballots		0	0.00	
Turnout		9,832	68.70	▼1.25
Registered electors		14,311		
Majority		870	8.85	▼34.88
BN gain from PBS		Swing		?
Source(s) "KEPUTUSAN PILIHAN RAYA UMUM DEWAN UNDANGAN NEGERI SABAH BAGI TAHUN 1994".

Sabah state election, 1990
Party	Candidate	Votes	%	∆%
PBS	Tham Nyip Shen	5,543	61.23	▼3.91
LDP	Chu Yin Foh	1,584	17.50	▲17.50
BERJAYA	Yap Pak Leong	937	10.35	▼24.11
DAP	Ang Lian Hai	908	10.03	▲10.03
Total valid votes		8,972	99.11	
Total rejected ballots		81	0.89	
Unreturned ballots		0	0.00	
Turnout		9,053	69.95	▼0.37
Registered electors		12,942		
Majority		3,959	43.73	▲13.05
PBS hold		Swing		
Source(s) "KEPUTUSAN PILIHAN RAYA UMUM DEWAN UNDANGAN NEGERI SABAH BAGI TAHUN 1990".

Sabah state election, 1986
Party	Candidate	Votes	%	∆%
PBS	Tham Nyip Shen	5,262	65.14	▲28.34
BERJAYA	Yap Pak Leong	2,784	34.46	▼0.30
Total valid votes		8,046	99.60	
Total rejected ballots		32	0.40	
Unreturned ballots		0	0.00	
Turnout		8,078	70.32	▼1.49
Registered electors		11,488		
Majority		2,478	30.68	▲28.64
PBS hold		Swing		
Source(s) "KEPUTUSAN PILIHAN RAYA UMUM DEWAN UNDANGAN NEGERI SABAH BAGI TAHUN 1986".

Sabah state election, 1985
Party	Candidate	Votes	%	∆%
PBS	Tham Nyip Shen	2,728	36.80	▲36.80
BERJAYA	Yap Pak Leong	2,577	34.76	▼40.52
USNO	Norjan Khin Bahadar	1,295	17.47	▲17.47
DAP	Patrick Ho Nyen Ching	813	10.97	▼3.11
Total valid votes		7,413	99.20	
Total rejected ballots		60		
Unreturned ballots		0	0.00	
Turnout		7,473	71.81	▼0.79
Registered electors		10,407		
Majority		199	2.04	▼59.16
PBS gain from BERJAYA		Swing		?
Source(s) "How they fared". New Straits Times. 1985-04-22.

Sabah state election, 1981
Party	Candidate	Votes	%	∆%
BERJAYA	Yap Pak Leong	5,599	75.28	▲2.91
DAP	Fung Ket Wing	1,047	14.08	▲14.08
Independent	Philip Fu Sui Cheong	792	10.65	
Total valid votes		7,438	100.00	
Total rejected ballots		55		
Unreturned ballots		0		
Turnout		7,493	72.55	▼3.46
Registered electors		10,328		
Majority		4,552	61.20	▲5.68
BERJAYA hold		Swing		

Sabah state election, 1976
Party	Candidate	Votes	%	∆%
BERJAYA	Yap Pak Leong	4,450	78.02	▲78.02
SCA	Chong Fook Tain	1,254	21.98	▲21.98
Total valid votes		5,704	100.00	
Total rejected ballots		62		
Unreturned ballots		0		
Turnout		5,766	76.01	▲12.04
Registered electors		7,586		
Majority		3,196	56.03	
BERJAYA hold		Swing		

Sabah state election, 1971
Party	Candidate	Votes	%	∆%
On the nomination day, Ngui Tet Ming won uncontested.
SCA	Ngui Tet Ming			
Total valid votes				
Total rejected ballots				
Unreturned ballots				
Turnout				
Registered electors				
SCA hold		Swing		

Sabah state election, 1967
Party	Candidate	Votes	%
Independent	Yap Pak Leong	2,715	69.01
SCA	Peter Lo Su Yin	1,219	30.99
Total valid votes		3,934	100.00
Total rejected ballots		40	
Unreturned ballots		0	
Turnout		3,974	87.55
Registered electors		4,539	
Majority		1,496	38.03
This was a new seat created.
