= Diocese of Sandakan =

Latin Catholic diocese in Malaysia

Diocese of Sandakan Dioecesis Sandakaanus Keuskupan Sandakan 山打根教区

Catholic
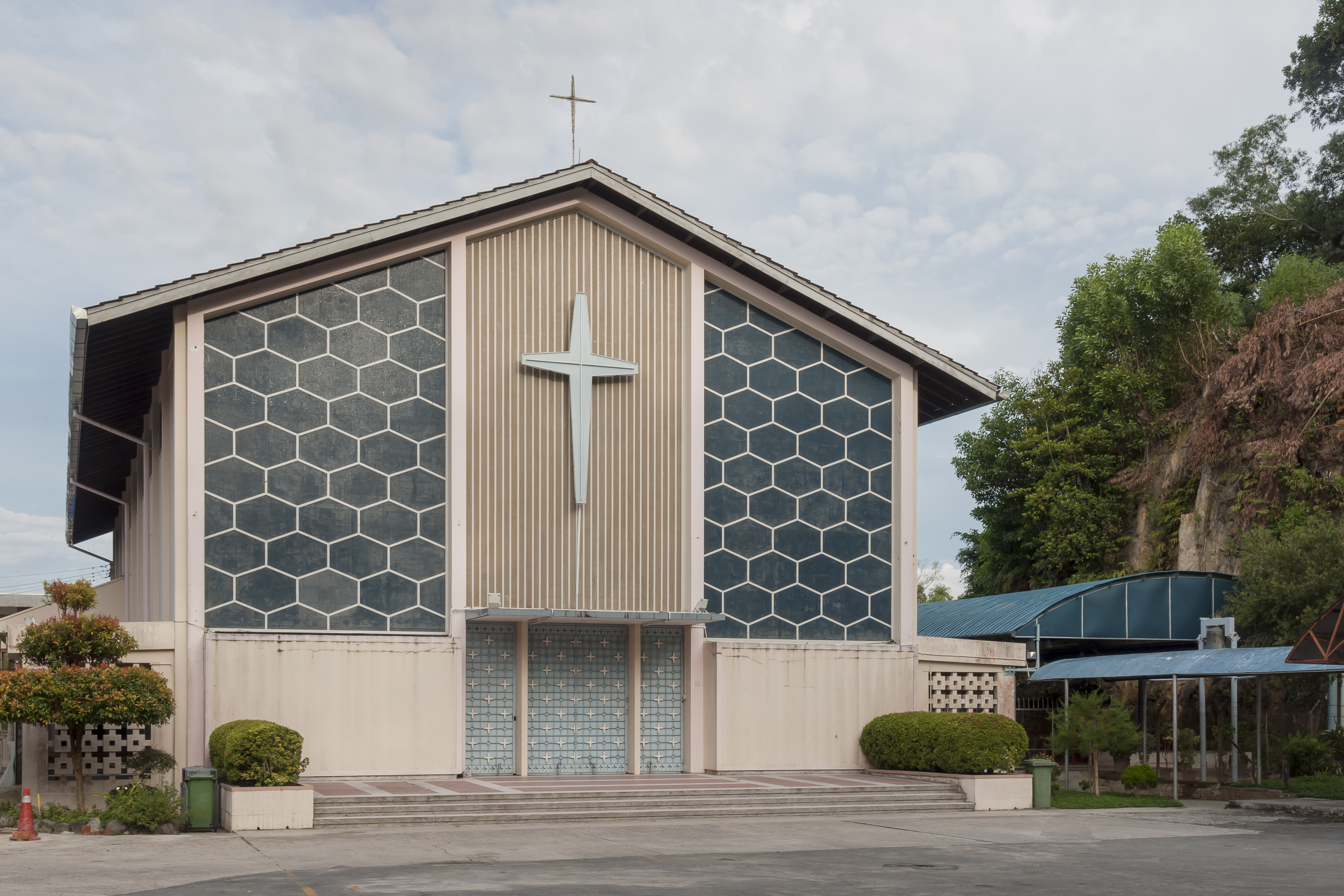
- Sandakan, Sabah: St. Mary's Cathedral and Parish Center

Location
- Country: Malaysia
- Territory: Sandakan; Beluran; Lahad Datu; Kunak; Semporna; Tawau; Kalabakan; Telupid; Tongod; Paitan; Kinabatangan
- Episcopal conference: Catholic Bishops' Conference of Malaysia, Singapore and Brunei
- Ecclesiastical province: Kota Kinabalu
- Metropolitan: Kota Kinabalu

Statistics
- Area: 43,657 km^{2} (16,856 sq mi)
- Population: Total; Catholics: (as of 2020); 1,378,723; 59,435 (4.31%)
- Parishes: 6

Information
- Denomination: Catholic Church
- Sui iuris church: Latin Church
- Rite: Roman Rite
- Established: 16 July 2007
- Cathedral: St. Mary's Cathedral in Sandakan
- Patron saint: Saint Mary
- Language: Ecclesiastical Latin; English language; Kadazan language; Cantonese language; Mandarin language; Hakka language; Dusun language; Malay language

Current leadership
- Pope: Leo XIV
- Bishop: Datuk Julius Dusin Gitom
- Metropolitan Archbishop: Datuk John Wong Soo Kau
- Vicar General: David Alyosius Garaman

Website
- https://www.dioceseofsandakan.org/

The Diocese of Sandakan (Dioecesis Sandakaanus; Keuskupan Sandakan: 山打根教区) is a Latin Catholic ecclesiastical jurisdiction located in Sabah, at East Malaysia. It is a suffragan diocese of the Archdiocese of Kota Kinabalu. The diocese is subdivided into 5 parishes (Sandakan, Beluran, Lahad Datu, Telupid and Tawau) and 1 mission district (Paitan), covering the east coast portion of the state comprising the Sandakan as well as Lahad Datu and Tawau divisions.

== History ==
The diocese was created by the decree of papal bull "Missionalem per navitatem" on 16 July 2007, and consist of the East Coast territory of the Archdiocese of Kota Kinabalu. Julius Dusin Gitom was appointed as the first bishop of the diocese. The diocese covers the Sandakan and Tawau Divisions located in the East Coast of Sabah state.

== Ordinaries ==
No.	Portrait	Name	Period in office	Insignia
1		Julius Dusin Gitom (born 1957)	16 July 2007 – Present	

== List of parishes ==
Five parishes and one mission are located in the Diocese of Sandakan.

- St. Mary's Cathedral Parish, Sandakan
  - Rector: Msgr. David Aloysius Garaman
- St. Dominic's Parish, Lahad Datu
  - Rector: Rev. Fr. Stanley William Matakim
- Paitan Mission (St. Francis of Assisi's Church), Paitan, Beluran
  - Administrator: Rev. Fr. Arthur John
- St. Martin's Parish, Telupid
  - Rector: Rev. Fr. Christopher Ireneus
- Holy Trinity Parish, Tawau
  - Rector: Rev. Fr. Raymond Lee Seng Huat
- Our Lady of Fatima Parish, Beluran
  - Rector: Rev. Fr. Stephen Esguerra

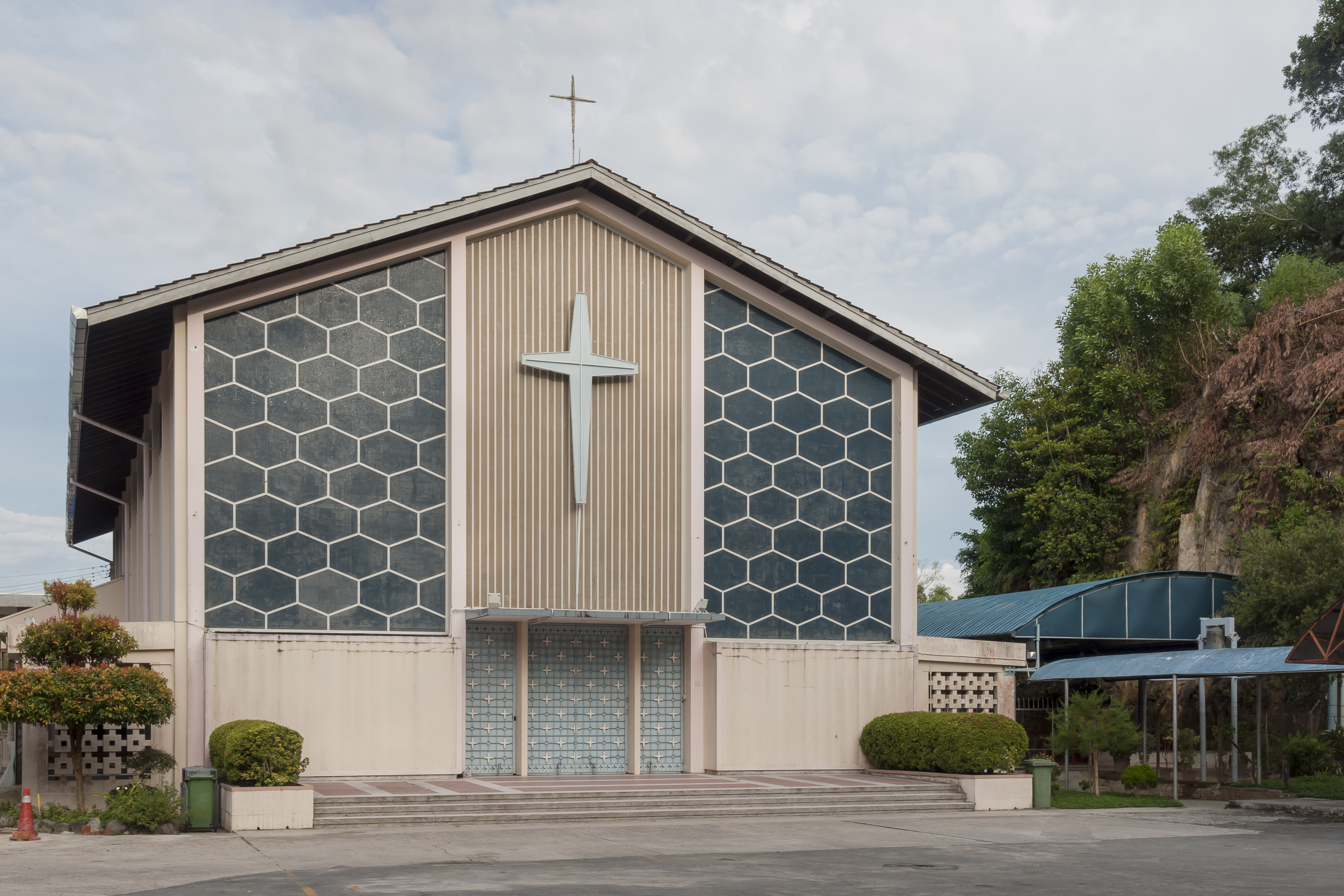
St. Mary's Cathedral in Sandakan, seat of the diocese.
