= Julius Dusin Gitom =

Malaysian prelate

His Excellency, The Most Reverend Datuk Julius Dusin Gitom PGDK
- Bishop of Sandakan
- Church: Roman Catholic Church
- Diocese: Sandakan
- Appointed: 16 July 2007
- Installed: 14 October 2007
- Predecessor: Established

Orders
- Ordination: 19 November 1989 by John Lee Hiong Fun-Yit Yaw
- Consecration: 14 October 2007 by Salvatore Pennacchio

Personal details
- Born: 14 October 1957 (age 68) Tamparuli, Tuaran, Crown Colony of North Borneo (now Sabah, Malaysia)
- Education: Pontifical Lateran University; Pontifical University of Saint Thomas Aquinas; University of Santo Tomas
- Motto: Serve one another in God's love (Malay: Melayani antara satu sama lain dalam kasih Tuhan)

Styles of Julius Dusin Gitom
- Reference style: His Excellency; The Most Reverend
- Spoken style: Your Excellency
- Religious style: Bishop

Datuk Julius Dusin Gitom (born 14 October 1957) is a Malaysian prelate of the Roman Catholic Church who has been serving as the first bishop of the Diocese of Sandakan since 2007.

== Early life and education ==
Julius Dusin Gitom was born on 14 October 1957 at Kampung Lokos, Kiulu, Tamparuli, Tuaran, a village on the foothills of Mount Kinabalu located on the tripoint border of Tuaran, Kota Belud as well as Ranau districts of Sabah's northern West Coast Division to a Roman Catholic Kadazan-Dusun family (jurisdictionally, his birth village remains under Tuaran district administration, but ecclesiastically administered under the pastoral care of St. Pius X Parish, Bundu Tuhan, Ranau, which is in turn a parish under the North West Coast Division deanery of the Archdiocese of Kota Kinabalu).

He attended school from the age of 5 in 1962 until finishing his Sijil Pelajaran Malaysia in 1975 and then worked for two years as a laboratory assistant for Tobishima Construction prior to joining the priesthood.

== Priesthood ==
At the age of 32, Julius was ordained to the priesthood for the Archdiocese of Kota Kinabalu by Archbishop John Lee Hiong Fun-Yit Yaw on 19 November 1989. Julius served in several parishes for seven years following his ordination.

He then completed a licentiate in moral theology at the Pontifical Lateran University in Rome and later earned a master's degree in spiritual theology at the Pontifical University of St. Thomas Aquinas which is also located in Rome. Later, he returned and served as one of the formators at Saint Peter's College Major Seminary, Kuching from 2000 to 2003.

After that, he was sent to University of Santo Tomas in Manila to obtain a licentiate in canon law and graduated in 2006, a year before his episcopal appointment.

== Bishop of Sandakan ==
Four months after completing his studies in March 2007 (although he has since graduated from his studies since around October–November 2006 whilst still being a priest), Benedict XVI named Julius the first bishop of the newly erected Diocese of Sandakan.

He received his episcopal consecration on 14 October 2007 (in conjunction with his golden jubilee 50th birthday) from Archbishop Salvatore Pennacchio, with Archbishop John Lee Hiong Fun-Yit Yaw of Kota Kinabalu and Bishop Cornelius Piong of Keningau serving as co-consecrators. He then chose the wordings, Serve one another in God's love as his episcopal motto.

== Honour ==
=== Honour of Malaysia ===
- Sabah
  - Commander of the Order of Kinabalu (PGDK) – Datuk (2012)

Catholic Church titles
Preceded by Established	Bishop of Sandakan; 2007–present	Incumbent
