= Sri Tanjong =

Sri Tanjong (N69)
Sabah constituency

State constituency
- Legislature: Sabah State Legislative Assembly
MLA
Justin Wong Yung Bin
Heritage
- Constituency created: 1984
- First contested: 1986
- Last contested: 2025

Demographics
- Population (2020): 60,878
- Electors (2025): 37,327

Sri Tanjong is a state constituency in Sabah, Malaysia, that is represented in the Sabah State Legislative Assembly.

== Demographics ==
Ethnic breakdown of Sri Tanjong's electorate as of 2025
1. Chinese (49.0%)
2. Muslim Bumiputera (32.0%)
3. Non-Muslim Bumiputera (18.0%)
4. Other ethnicities (1.00%)

== History ==
=== Polling districts ===
According to the gazette issued on 31 October 2022, the Sri Tanjung constituency has a total of 10 polling districts.

State constituency	Polling District	Code	Location
Sri Tanjung (N69)	Kuhara	190/69/01	SMK Tawau
Sri Tanjung (N69)	Sing On	190/69/02	SJK (C) Hing Hwa
Sri Tanjung (N69)	Fajar	190/69/03	SK St. Ursula
Sri Tanjung (N69)	Sabindo	190/69/04	SMK Holy Trinity
Sri Tanjung (N69)	Kabota	190/69/05	SJK (C) Kung Ming
Sri Tanjung (N69)	Batu 3	190/69/06	SMK Taman Tawau
Sri Tanjung (N69)	Da Hwa	190/69/07	SMK Jambatan Putih
Sri Tanjung (N69)	Kapital	190/69/08	Kolej Tingkatan Enam Tawau
Sri Tanjung (N69)	Jalan Chester	190/69/09	SJK (C) Sin Hwa
Sri Tanjung (N69)	Takada	190/69/10	Sabah Chinese High School

=== Representation history ===
Member of Sabah State Legislative Assembly for Sri Tanjong
Assembly	No	Years	Member	Party
Constituency created from Bandar Tawau
7th	N44	1985–1986	Hiew Min Kong (丘民光)	BN (BERJAYA)
8th	N44	1986–1990	Ku Hien Liong (辜贤良)	PCBS
9th	N44	1990–1994	Michael Lim Sun Yang (林运生)	GR (PBS)
10th	N44	1994	Michael Lim Sun Yang (林运生)	GR (PBS)
10th	N44	1994–1999	Michael Lim Sun Yang (林运生)	BN (SAPP)
11th	N48	1999–2002	Samson Chin Chee Tsu (陈志慈)	PBS
11th	N48	2002–2004	Samson Chin Chee Tsu (陈志慈)	BN (PBS)
12th	N57	2004–2008	Samson Chin Chee Tsu (陈志慈)	BN (PBS)
13th	N57	2008–2013	Jimmy Wong Sze Phin (黄仕平)	PR (DAP)
14th	N57	2013–2018	Chan Foong Hin (陈泓缣)	PR (DAP)
15th	N57	2018–2020	Jimmy Wong Sze Phin (黄仕平)	PH (DAP)
16th	N69	2020–2022	Justin Wong Yung Bin (黄勇斌)	PH (DAP)
16th	N69	2022	Justin Wong Yung Bin (黄勇斌)	Independent
16th	N69	2022–2025	Justin Wong Yung Bin (黄勇斌)	WARISAN
17th	N69	2025–present	Justin Wong Yung Bin (黄勇斌)	WARISAN

== Election results ==
Sabah state election, 2025: Sri Tanjong
Party	Candidate	Votes	%	∆%
Heritage	Justin Wong Yung Bin	9,774	52.59	▼22.98
PH	Philip Yap Wui Lip	6,661	35.84	▲35.84
Homeland Solidarity Party	Fung Len Fui	1,133	6.10	▲6.10
Sabah Dream Party	Joseph Mosusah	412	2.22	▲2.22
Independent	Wong Su Vui	306	1.65	▲1.65
KDM	Ricky Hong Chee Kiong	298	1.60	▲1.60
Total valid votes		18,584	49.79	
Total rejected ballots		281		
Unreturned ballots		49		
Turnout		18,914	50.67	▼5.17
Registered electors		37,327		
Majority		3,113	16.75	▼43.43
Heritage hold		Swing		
Source(s) "RESULTS OF CONTESTED ELECTION AND STATEMENTS OF THE POLL AFTER THE OFFICIAL ADDITION OF VOTES" (PDF).

Sabah state election, 2020: Sri Tanjong
Party	Candidate	Votes	%	∆%
Sabah Heritage Party	Justin Wong Yung Bin	11,150	75.57	▲75.57
PN	Fung Len Fui	2,270	15.39	▲15.39
Sabah People's Hope Party	Yapp Yin Hoau	568	3.85	▼0.66
LDP	Lim Ting Khai	276	1.87	▲1.87
GAGASAN	Wong Su Vui	117	0.79	▲0.79
Love Sabah Party	Kour Ken-Keat	80	0.54	▲0.54
Independent	Chung Yaw Vui	52	0.35	▲0.35
Sabah People's Unity Party	Ricky Pang Siau Chern	46	0.31	▲0.31
Total valid votes		14,559	98.68	
Total rejected ballots		139	0.94	
Unreturned ballots		96	0.65	
Turnout		14,754	55.84	▼17.46
Registered electors		26,493		
Majority		8,880	60.18	▲11.70
Sabah Heritage Party hold		Swing		
Source(s) "RESULTS OF CONTESTED ELECTION AND STATEMENTS OF THE POLL AFTER THE OFFICIAL ADDITION OF VOTES".

Sabah state election, 2018: Sri Tanjong
Party	Candidate	Votes	%	∆%
DAP	Wong Sze Phin	13,673	70.65	▲4.75
BN	Lo Su Fui	4,290	22.17	▼8.06
Sabah People's Hope Party	Pang Thou Chung	873	4.51	▲4.51
Sabah Nationality Party	Leong Yun Fui	154	0.80	▲0.80
Total valid votes		18,990	98.13	
Total rejected ballots		285	1.47	
Unreturned ballots		77	0.40	
Turnout		19,352	73.30	▼1.61
Registered electors		26,400		
Majority		9,383	48.48	▲12.81
DAP hold		Swing		
Source(s) "RESULTS OF CONTESTED ELECTION AND STATEMENTS OF THE POLL AFTER THE OFFICIAL ADDITION OF VOTES".

Sabah state election, 2013: Sri Tanjong
Party	Candidate	Votes	%	∆%
DAP	Chan Foong Hin	10,948	65.90	▲24.06
BN	Fung Len Fui	5,021	30.23	▼2.46
SAPP	Yong Ah Poh	260	1.57	▲1.57
STAR	Olivia Chong Oi Yun	128	0.77	▲0.77
Total valid votes		16,357	98.46	
Total rejected ballots		201	1.21	
Unreturned ballots		54	0.33	
Turnout		16,612	74.91	▲11.84
Registered electors		22,175		
Majority		5,927	35.67	▲26.52
DAP hold		Swing		
Source(s) "KEPUTUSAN PILIHAN RAYA UMUM DEWAN UNDANGAN NEGERI".

Sabah state election, 2008: Sri Tanjong
Party	Candidate	Votes	%	∆%
DAP	Wong Sze Phin	5,359	41.84	▲10.18
BN	Samson Chin Chee Tsu	4,187	32.69	▼34.75
PKR	Kong Hong Ming @ Kong Fo Min	3,090	24.13	▲24.13
Total valid votes		12,636	98.66	
Total rejected ballots		146	1.14	
Unreturned ballots		25	0.20	
Turnout		12,807	63.07	▲7.17
Registered electors		20,306		
Majority		1,172	9.15	▼26.63
DAP gain from BN		Swing		?
Source(s) "KEPUTUSAN PILIHAN RAYA UMUM DEWAN UNDANGAN NEGERI SABAH BAGI TAHUN 2008".

Sabah state election, 2004: Sri Tanjong
Party	Candidate	Votes	%	∆%
BN	Samson Chin Chee Tsu	7,365	67.44	▼4.62
DAP	Cheah Nget Min	3,458	31.66	▲31.66
Total valid votes		10,823	99.10	
Total rejected ballots		96	0.88	
Unreturned ballots		2	0.02	
Turnout		10,921	55.90	▼10.27
Registered electors		19,536		
Majority		3,907	35.78	▲14.77
BN gain from PBS		Swing		?
Source(s) "KEPUTUSAN PILIHAN RAYA UMUM DEWAN UNDANGAN NEGERI SABAH BAGI TAHUN 2004".

Sabah state election, 1999: Sri Tanjong
Party	Candidate	Votes	%	∆%
PBS	Samson Chin Chee Tsu	8,759	49.06	▼2.76
BN	Michael Lim Yun Sang	5,007	28.05	▼18.22
BERSEKUTU	Shanty Chong Chui Lin	3,814	21.36	▲21.36
Independent	Mohd Abidin Patangari	155	0.87	▲0.87
Total valid votes		17,735	99.34	
Total rejected ballots		117	0.66	
Unreturned ballots		0	0.00	
Turnout		17,852	66.17	▼1.25
Registered electors		26,981		
Majority		3,752	21.01	▲15.46
PBS hold		Swing		
Source(s) "KEPUTUSAN PILIHAN RAYA UMUM DEWAN UNDANGAN NEGERI SABAH BAGI TAHUN 1999".

Sabah state election, 1994: Sri Tanjong
Party	Candidate	Votes	%	∆%
PBS	Michael Lim Yun Sang	8,637	51.82	▼4.91
BN	Yee Lung Fook Geoffrey	7,711	46.27	▲27.06
PAS	Armanus Arsad	197	1.18	▲1.18
Total valid votes		16,545	99.27	
Total rejected ballots		121	0.73	
Unreturned ballots		0	0.00	
Turnout		16,666	67.42	▼6.60
Registered electors		24,720		
Majority		926	5.55	▼31.97
PBS hold		Swing		
Source(s) "KEPUTUSAN PILIHAN RAYA UMUM DEWAN UNDANGAN NEGERI SABAH BAGI TAHUN 1994".

Sabah state election, 1990: Sri Tanjong
Party	Candidate	Votes	%	∆%
PBS	Michael Lim Yun Sang	7,875	56.73	▲56.73
USNO	Aziz Abdullah Wong	2,667	19.21	▲19.21
LDP	Hiew Min Kong	1,251	9.01	▲9.01
DAP	Lee Show Pui @ John	848	6.11	▲6.11
BERJAYA	Charlie Chang Chau Lap	805	5.80	▼30.74
Independent	Jack Cheah Nget Min	166	1.20	▲1.20
Independent	Wong Sze Phin	122	0.88	▲0.88
PRS	Henry Lai Man Yeung	64	0.46	▲0.46
Total valid votes		13,798	99.40	
Total rejected ballots		83	0.60	
Unreturned ballots		0	0.00	
Turnout		13,881	74.02	▲0.05
Registered electors		18,752		
Majority		5,208	37.52	▲14.28
PBS gain from SCCP		Swing		?
Source(s) "KEPUTUSAN PILIHAN RAYA UMUM DEWAN UNDANGAN NEGERI SABAH BAGI TAHUN 1990".

Sabah state election, 1986: Sri Tanjong
Party	Candidate	Votes	%	∆%
SCCP	Ku Hien Liong	7,335	59.78	▲59.78
BERJAYA	Hiew Min Kong	4,559	36.54	▼12.53
Love Sabah Party (1980)	Charlie Chang Chau Lap	521	4.18	▲4.18
Total valid votes		12,415	99.50	
Total rejected ballots		63	0.50	
Unreturned ballots		0	0.00	
Turnout		12,478	73.97	▼1.45
Registered electors		16,868		
Majority		2,776	23.24	▲3.41
SCCP gain from BN		Swing		?
Source(s) "KEPUTUSAN PILIHAN RAYA UMUM DEWAN UNDANGAN NEGERI SABAH BAGI TAHUN 1986".

Sabah state election, 1985: Sri Tanjong
Party	Candidate	Votes	%
BERJAYA	Hiew Min Kong	5,567	49.07
PBS	Michael Lim Yun Sang	3,317	29.24
USNO	Ahmad Mohd. Yusof	2,229	19.65
Sabah Democratic Peoples' Party	Arsah Sutir	232	2.04
Total valid votes		11,345	99.15
Total rejected ballots		97	0.85
Unreturned ballots		0	0.00
Turnout		11,442	75.42
Registered electors		15,170	
Majority		2,250	19.83
This was a new seat created.
