= List of the winning political parties in the Malaysian general election by parliamentary constituency =

This is the list of the winning political parties in the Malaysian general election by parliamentary constituency.

State	Parliamentary Constituency	General elections															
State	Parliamentary Constituency	1955	1959	1964	1969	1974	1978	1982	1986	1990	1995	1999	2004	2008	2013	2018	2022
State	Parliamentary Constituency	members	members	members	members	members	members	members	members	members	members	members	members	members	members	members	members
Perlis	Arau					BN (UMNO)	BN (UMNO)	BN (UMNO)	BN (UMNO)	BN (UMNO)	BN (UMNO)	BN (UMNO)	BN (UMNO)	BN (UMNO)	BN (UMNO)	BN (UMNO)	PN (PAS)
Perlis	Kangar					BN (UMNO)	BN (UMNO)	BN (UMNO)	BN (UMNO)	BN (UMNO)	BN (UMNO)	BN (UMNO)	BN (UMNO)	BN (UMNO)	BN (UMNO)	PH (PKR)	PN (PPBM)
Perlis	Padang Besar										BN (UMNO)	BN (UMNO)	BN (UMNO)	BN (UMNO)	BN (UMNO)	BN (UMNO)	PN (PAS)
Perlis	Perlis	Alliance (UMNO)															
Perlis	Perlis Selatan		Alliance (UMNO)	Alliance (UMNO)	Alliance (UMNO)												
Perlis	Perlis Utara		Alliance (UMNO)	Alliance (UMNO)	Alliance (UMNO)												
Kedah	Alor Setar	Alliance (MCA)	Alliance (MCA)	Alliance (MCA)	Alliance (MCA)	BN (MCA)	BN (MCA)	BN (MCA)	BN (MCA)	BN (MCA)	BN (MCA)	BN (MCA)	BN (MCA)	BN (MCA)	PR (PKR)	PH (PKR)	PN (PAS)
Kedah	Baling		Alliance (UMNO)	Alliance (UMNO)	Alliance (UMNO)	BN (UMNO)	PAS	BN (UMNO)	BN (UMNO)	BN (UMNO)	BN (UMNO)	BA (PAS)	BN (UMNO)	PR (PAS)	BN (UMNO)	BN (UMNO)	PN (PAS)
Kedah	Jerai		Alliance (UMNO)	Alliance (UMNO)	Alliance (UMNO)	BN (UMNO)	BN (UMNO)	BN (UMNO)	BN (UMNO)	BN (UMNO)			BN (UMNO)	PR (PAS)	BN (UMNO)	GS (PAS)	PN (PAS)
Kedah	Jerlun										BN (UMNO)	BA (PAS)	BN (UMNO)	BN (UMNO)	BN (UMNO)	PH (PPBM)	PN (PAS)
Kedah	Jerlun-Langkawi					BN (UMNO)	BN (UMNO)	BN (UMNO)	BN (UMNO)	BN (UMNO)							
Kedah	Jitra-Padang Terap		Alliance (UMNO)	Alliance (UMNO)	Alliance (UMNO)												
Kedah	Kedah Selatan	Alliance (MCA)															
Kedah	Kedah Tengah	Alliance (UMNO)	Alliance (UMNO)	Alliance (UMNO)	Alliance (UMNO)												
Kedah	Kedah Utara	Alliance (UMNO)															
Kedah	Kota Setar	Alliance (UMNO)				BN (PAS)	PAS	PAS	BN (UMNO)	BN (UMNO)							
Kedah	Kota Star Selatan		Alliance (UMNO)	Alliance (UMNO)	PAS												
Kedah	Kota Star Utara		Alliance (UMNO)	Alliance (UMNO)	PAS												
Kedah	Kuala Kedah		Alliance (UMNO)	Alliance (UMNO)	Alliance (UMNO)	BN (UMNO)	BN (UMNO)	BN (UMNO)	BN (UMNO)	BN (UMNO)	BN (UMNO)	BA (PAS)	BN (UMNO)	PR (PKR)	PR (PKR)	PH (PKR)	PN (PAS)
Kedah	Kuala Muda					BN (UMNO)	BN (UMNO)	BN (UMNO)									
Kedah	Kubang Pasu					BN (UMNO)	BN (UMNO)	BN (UMNO)	BN (UMNO)	BN (UMNO)	BN (UMNO)	BN (UMNO)	BN (UMNO)	BN (UMNO)	BN (UMNO)	PH (PPBM)	PN (PPBM)
Kedah	Kubang Pasu Barat		Alliance (UMNO)	Alliance (UMNO)	PAS												
Kedah	Kulim Utara		Alliance (UMNO)	Alliance (UMNO)	Alliance (UMNO)												
Kedah	Kulim-Bandar Baharu		Alliance (MCA)	Alliance (MCA)	Alliance (MCA)	BN (UMNO)	BN (UMNO)	BN (UMNO)	BN (UMNO)	BN (UMNO)	BN (UMNO)	BN (UMNO)	BN (UMNO)	PR (PKR)	BN (UMNO)	PH (PKR)	PN (PPBM)
Kedah	Langkawi										BN (UMNO)	BN (UMNO)	BN (UMNO)	BN (UMNO)	BN (UMNO)	PH (PPBM)	PN (PPBM)
Kedah	Merbok								BN (UMNO)	BN (UMNO)	BN (UMNO)	BN (UMNO)	BN (UMNO)	PR (PKR)	BN (UMNO)	PH (PKR)	PN (PPBM)
Kedah	Padang Serai					BN (MCA)	BN (MCA)	BN (MCA)	BN (MCA)	BN (MCA)	BN (MCA)	BN (MCA)	BN (MCA)	PR (PKR)	PR (PKR)	PH (PKR)	PN (PPBM)
Kedah	Padang Terap					BN (PAS)	BN (UMNO)	BN (UMNO)	BN (UMNO)	BN (UMNO)	BN (UMNO)	BA (PAS)	BN (UMNO)	PR (PAS)	BN (UMNO)	BN (UMNO)	PN (PAS)
Kedah	Pendang								BN (UMNO)	BN (UMNO)	BN (UMNO)	BA (PAS)	BA (PAS)	PR (PAS)	BN (UMNO)	GS (PAS)	PN (PAS)
Kedah	Pokok Sena										BN (UMNO)	BA (PAS)	BN (UMNO)	PR (PAS)	PR (PAS)	PH (Amanah)	PN (PAS)
Kedah	Sik								BN (UMNO)	BN (UMNO)	BN (UMNO)	BA (PAS)	BN (UMNO)	PR (PAS)	BN (UMNO)	GS (PAS)	PN (PAS)
Kedah	Sungai Petani		Alliance (UMNO)	Alliance (UMNO)	Alliance (UMNO)	BN (UMNO)	BN (UMNO)	BN (UMNO)	BN (UMNO)	BN (UMNO)	BN (UMNO)	BN (UMNO)	BN (UMNO)	PR (PKR)	PR (PKR)	PH (PKR)	PH (PKR)
Kedah	Sungei Muda	Alliance (UMNO)															
Kedah	Ulu Muda					BN (PAS)	BN (UMNO)	BN (UMNO)									
Kedah	Yan										BN (UMNO)	BA (PAS)					
Kelantan	Bachok		PMIP	PAS	PAS	BN (PAS)	PAS	PAS	BN (HAMIN)	APU (PAS)	APU (PAS)	BA (PAS)	BN (UMNO)	PR (PAS)	PR (PAS)	GS (PAS)	PN (PAS)
Kelantan	Gua Musang								BN (UMNO)	APU (S46)	APU (S46)	BN (UMNO)	BN (UMNO)	BN (UMNO)	BN (UMNO)	BN (UMNO)	PN (PPBM)
Kelantan	Jeli										BN (UMNO)	BA (PAS)	BN (UMNO)	BN (UMNO)	BN (UMNO)	BN (UMNO)	PN (PPBM)
Kelantan	Kelantan Hilir		PMIP	PAS	PAS												
Kelantan	Kelantan Selatan	Alliance (UMNO)															
Kelantan	Kelantan Tengah	Alliance (UMNO)															
Kelantan	Kelantan Timor	Alliance (UMNO)															
Kelantan	Kelantan Utara	Alliance (UMNO)															
Kelantan	Ketereh												BN (UMNO)	PR (PKR)	BN (UMNO)	BN (UMNO)	PN (PPBM)
Kelantan	Kok Lanas								BN (UMNO)	APU (S46)							
Kelantan	Kota Bharu					BN (UMNO)	BN (UMNO)	BN (UMNO)	BN (UMNO)	APU (S46)	APU (S46)	BA (KeADILan)	BN (UMNO)	PR (PAS)	PR (PAS)	GS (PAS)	PN (PAS)
Kelantan	Kota Bharu Hilir		PMIP	Alliance (UMNO)	Alliance (UMNO)												
Kelantan	Kota Bharu Hulu		PMIP	PAS	PAS												
Kelantan	Kuala Krai					BN (PAS)	BN (UMNO)	BN (UMNO)	BN (UMNO)	APU (PAS)	APU (PAS)	BA (PAS)	BN (UMNO)	PR (PAS)	PR (PAS)	GS (PAS)	PN (PAS)
Kelantan	Kubang Kerian										APU (PAS)	BA (PAS)	BA (PAS)	PR (PAS)	PR (PAS)	GS (PAS)	PN (PAS)
Kelantan	Machang					BN (UMNO)	BN (UMNO)	BN (UMNO)	BN (UMNO)	APU (S46)	APU (S46)	BA (PAS)	BN (UMNO)	PR (PKR)	BN (UMNO)	BN (UMNO)	PN (PPBM)
Kelantan	Nilam Puri					BN (PAS)	BN (UMNO)	BN (UMNO)	BN (UMNO)	APU (PAS)							
Kelantan	Pasir Mas	Alliance (UMNO)				BN (PAS)	BN (UMNO)	PAS	BN (UMNO)	APU (S46)	APU (S46)	BA (PAS)	BA (PAS)	PR (PAS)	PR (PAS)	GS (PAS)	PN (PAS)
Kelantan	Pasir Mas Hilir		PMIP	PAS	PAS												
Kelantan	Pasir Mas Hulu		PMIP	PAS	PAS												
Kelantan	Pasir Puteh		PMIP	PAS	PAS	BN (PAS)	BN (UMNO)	BN (UMNO)	BN (UMNO)	APU (S46)	APU (S46)	BA (PAS)	BA (PAS)	PR (PAS)	PR (PAS)	GS (PAS)	PN (PAS)
Kelantan	Pengkalan Chepa					BN (PAS)	PAS	PAS	PAS	APU (PAS)	APU (PAS)	BA (PAS)	BA (PAS)	PR (PAS)	PR (PAS)	GS (PAS)	PN (PAS)
Kelantan	Peringat										BN (UMNO)	BA (KeADILan)					
Kelantan	Rantau Panjang					BN (PAS)	BN (UMNO)	PAS	BN (UMNO)	APU (PAS)	APU (PAS)	BA (PAS)	BA (PAS)	PR (PAS)	PR (PAS)	GS (PAS)	PN (PAS)
Kelantan	Tanah Merah		PMIP	PAS	Alliance (UMNO)	BN (UMNO)	BN (UMNO)	BN (UMNO)	BN (UMNO)	APU (S46)	APU (S46)	BA (KeADILan)	BN (UMNO)	PR (PKR)	BN (UMNO)	BN (UMNO)	PN (PPBM)
Kelantan	Tumpat		PMIP	PAS	Alliance (UMNO)	BN (UMNO)	BN (UMNO)	BN (UMNO)	BN (UMNO)	APU (PAS)	APU (PAS)	BA (PAS)	BA (PAS)	PR (PAS)	PR (PAS)	GS (PAS)	PN (PAS)
Kelantan	Ulu Kelantan		Alliance (UMNO)	Alliance (UMNO)	Alliance (UMNO)	BN (UMNO)	BN (UMNO)	BN (UMNO)									
Terengganu	Besut		PMIP	PAS	Alliance (UMNO)	BN (UMNO)	BN (UMNO)	BN (UMNO)	BN (UMNO)	BN (UMNO)	BN (UMNO)	BA (PAS)	BN (UMNO)	BN (UMNO)	BN (UMNO)	BN (UMNO)	PN (PAS)
Terengganu	Dungun		PMIP	Alliance (UMNO)	PAS	BN (PAS)	BN (UMNO)	BN (UMNO)	BN (UMNO)	BN (UMNO)	BN (UMNO)	BA (PAS)	BN (UMNO)	BN (UMNO)	PR (PAS)	GS (PAS)	PN (PAS)
Terengganu	Hulu Terengganu					BN (UMNO)	BN (UMNO)	BN (UMNO)	BN (UMNO)	BN (UMNO)	BN (UMNO)	BA (PAS)	BN (UMNO)	BN (UMNO)	BN (UMNO)	BN (UMNO)	PN (PPBM)
Terengganu	Kemaman		Alliance (UMNO)	Alliance (UMNO)	Alliance (UMNO)	BN (UMNO)	BN (UMNO)	BN (UMNO)	BN (UMNO)	BN (UMNO)	BN (UMNO)	BA (KeADILan)	BN (UMNO)	BN (UMNO)	BN (UMNO)	GS (PAS)	PN (PAS)
Terengganu	Kuala Nerus					BN (UMNO)	BN (UMNO)	BN (UMNO)	BN (UMNO)	BN (UMNO)	BN (UMNO)	BA (PAS)	BN (UMNO)	BN (UMNO)	PR (PAS)	GS (PAS)	PN (PAS)
Terengganu	Kuala Terengganu					BN (PAS)	BN (UMNO)	BN (UMNO)	BN (UMNO)	APU (S46)	BN (UMNO)	BA (PAS)	BN (UMNO)	BN (UMNO)	PR (PAS)	GS (PAS)	PN (PAS)
Terengganu	Kuala Trengganu Selatan		Negara	Alliance (UMNO)	PAS												
Terengganu	Kuala Trengganu Utara		PMIP	Alliance (UMNO)	Alliance (UMNO)												
Terengganu	Marang								BN (UMNO)	APU (PAS)	APU (PAS)	BA (PAS)	BN (UMNO)	PR (PAS)	PR (PAS)	GS (PAS)	PN (PAS)
Terengganu	Setiu								BN (UMNO)	BN (UMNO)	BN (UMNO)	BA (PAS)	BN (UMNO)	BN (UMNO)	BN (UMNO)	GS (PAS)	PN (PAS)
Terengganu	Trengganu Selatan	Alliance (UMNO)															
Terengganu	Trengganu Tengah	Alliance (UMNO)	PMIP	Alliance (UMNO)	Alliance (UMNO)												
Terengganu	Trengganu Utara	Alliance (UMNO)															
Terengganu	Ulu Nerus					BN (PAS)	BN (UMNO)	BN (UMNO)									
Penang	Bagan		Alliance (MCA)	Alliance (MCA)	Alliance (MCA)				DAP	GR (DAP)	GR (DAP)	BA (DAP)	DAP	PR (DAP)	PR (DAP)	PH (DAP)	PH (DAP)
Penang	Balik Pulau					BN (UMNO)	BN (UMNO)	BN (UMNO)	BN (UMNO)	BN (UMNO)	BN (UMNO)	BN (UMNO)	BN (UMNO)	PR (PKR)	BN (UMNO)	PH (PKR)	PH (PKR)
Penang	Batu Kawan												BN (Gerakan)	PR (DAP)	PR (DAP)	PH (DAP)	PH (DAP)
Penang	Bayan Baru								DAP	GR (DAP)	BN (MCA)	BN (MCA)	BN (MCA)	PR (PKR)	PR (PKR)	PH (PKR)	PH (PKR)
Penang	Bukit Bendera					BN (MCA)	DAP	DAP	DAP	GR (DAP)	BN (Gerakan)	BN (Gerakan)	BN (Gerakan)	PR (DAP)	PR (DAP)	PH (DAP)	PH (DAP)
Penang	Bukit Gelugor												DAP	PR (DAP)	PR (DAP)	PH (DAP)	PH (DAP)
Penang	Bukit Mertajam					BN (MCA)	DAP	BN (MCA)	DAP	GR (DAP)	BN (MCA)	BA (DAP)	DAP	PR (DAP)	PR (DAP)	PH (DAP)	PH (DAP)
Penang	Dato' Kramat		SF (Lab)	SF (Lab)	Gerakan												
Penang	George Town	Alliance (MCA)															
Penang	Jelutong					BN (Gerakan)	DAP	DAP	DAP	GR (DAP)	GR (DAP)	BN (Gerakan)	BN (Gerakan)	PR (DAP)	PR (DAP)	PH (DAP)	PH (DAP)
Penang	Kepala Batas					BN (UMNO)	BN (UMNO)	BN (UMNO)	BN (UMNO)	BN (UMNO)	BN (UMNO)	BN (UMNO)	BN (UMNO)	BN (UMNO)	BN (UMNO)	BN (UMNO)	PN (PAS)
Penang	Mata Kuching					BN (MCA)	BN (MCA)	BN (MCA)									
Penang	Nibong Tebal					BN (Gerakan)	BN (Gerakan)	BN (Gerakan)	BN (Gerakan)	BN (Gerakan)	BN (Gerakan)	BA (DAP)	BN (UMNO)	PR (PKR)	PR (PKR)	PH (PKR)	PH (PKR)
Penang	Penang Island	Alliance (UMNO)															
Penang	Penang Selatan		Alliance (UMNO)	Alliance (UMNO)	Gerakan												
Penang	Penang Utara		Alliance (MCA)	Alliance (MCA)	DAP												
Penang	Permatang Pauh					BN (UMNO)	PAS	BN (UMNO)	BN (UMNO)	BN (UMNO)	BN (UMNO)	BA (KeADILan)	BA (PKR)	PR (PKR)	PR (PKR)	PH (PKR)	PN (PAS)
Penang	Seberang Selatan		SF (Lab)	Alliance (UMNO)	Gerakan												
Penang	Seberang Tengah		Alliance (UMNO)	Alliance (UMNO)	Gerakan												
Penang	Seberang Utara		Alliance (UMNO)	Alliance (UMNO)	Alliance (UMNO)												
Penang	Tanjong		SF (Lab)	UDP	Gerakan	BN (Gerakan)	DAP	BN (Gerakan)	DAP	GR (DAP)	GR (DAP)	BA (DAP)	DAP	PR (DAP)	PR (DAP)	PH (DAP)	PH (DAP)
Penang	Tasek Gelugor								BN (UMNO)	BN (UMNO)	BN (UMNO)	BN (UMNO)	BN (UMNO)	BN (UMNO)	BN (UMNO)	BN (UMNO)	PN (PPBM)
Penang	Wellesley North	Alliance (UMNO)															
Penang	Wellesley South	Alliance (MCA)															
Perak	Bagan Datuk		Alliance (UMNO)	Alliance (UMNO)	Alliance (UMNO)	BN (UMNO)	BN (UMNO)	BN (UMNO)	BN (UMNO)	BN (UMNO)	BN (UMNO)	BN (UMNO)	BN (UMNO)	BN (UMNO)	BN (UMNO)	BN (UMNO)	BN (UMNO)
Perak	Bagan Serai					BN (UMNO)	BN (UMNO)	BN (UMNO)	BN (UMNO)	BN (UMNO)	BN (UMNO)	BN (UMNO)	BN (UMNO)	PR (PKR)	BN (UMNO)	BN (UMNO)	PN (PAS)
Perak	Batang Padang	Alliance (UMNO)	Alliance (UMNO)	Alliance (UMNO)	DAP	BN (UMNO)	BN (UMNO)	BN (UMNO)									
Perak	Batu Gajah		PPP	Alliance (MCA)	DAP	DAP	DAP	BN (MCA)	DAP	GR (DAP)	BN (MCA)	BA (DAP)	DAP	PR (DAP)	PR (DAP)	PH (DAP)	PH (DAP)
Perak	Beruas		IND	Alliance (MCA)	PPP	BN (PPP)	DAP	BN (MCA)	BN (Gerakan)	BN (Gerakan)	BN (Gerakan)	BN (Gerakan)	BN (Gerakan)	PR (DAP)	PR (DAP)	PH (DAP)	PH (DAP)
Perak	Bukit Gantang								BN (UMNO)	BN (UMNO)	BN (UMNO)	BN (UMNO)	BN (Gerakan)	PR (PAS)	PR (PAS)	BN (UMNO)	PN (PPBM)
Perak	Chenderoh										BN (UMNO)	BN (UMNO)					
Perak	Dindings	Alliance (UMNO)															
Perak	Gerik					BN (UMNO)	BN (UMNO)	BN (UMNO)	BN (UMNO)	BN (UMNO)	BN (UMNO)	BN (UMNO)	BN (UMNO)	BN (Gerakan)	BN (UMNO)	BN (UMNO)	PN (PPBM)
Perak	Gopeng								BN (MCA)	BN (MCA)	BN (MCA)	BN (MCA)	BN (MCA)	PR (PKR)	PR (PKR)	PH (PKR)	PH (PKR)
Perak	Hilir Perak		Alliance (UMNO)	Alliance (UMNO)	Alliance (UMNO)	BN (UMNO)	BN (UMNO)	BN (UMNO)									
Perak	Ipoh		PPP	PPP	PPP	DAP	DAP	BN (MCA)	DAP	GR (DAP)							
Perak	Ipoh-Menglembu	Alliance (MCA)															
Perak	Ipoh Barat										BN (MCA)	BN (MCA)	DAP	PR (DAP)	PR (DAP)	PH (DAP)	PH (DAP)
Perak	Ipoh Timor										BN (MCA)	BN (MCA)	DAP	PR (DAP)	PR (DAP)	PH (DAP)	PH (DAP)
Perak	Kampar		Alliance (MCA)	Alliance (MCA)	DAP				DAP	GR (DAP)	BN (MCA)	BN (MCA)	BN (MCA)	BN (MCA)	PR (DAP)	PH (DAP)	PH (DAP)
Perak	Kinta					DAP	BN (MCA)	BN (MCA)									
Perak	Kinta Selatan	Alliance (MCA)															
Perak	Kinta Utara	Alliance (MIC)															
Perak	Krian	PMIP															
Perak	Krian Darat		Alliance (UMNO)	Alliance (UMNO)	Alliance (UMNO)												
Perak	Krian Laut		Alliance (UMNO)	Alliance (UMNO)	Alliance (UMNO)												
Perak	Kuala Kangsar		Alliance (UMNO)	Alliance (UMNO)	Alliance (UMNO)	BN (UMNO)	BN (UMNO)	BN (UMNO)	BN (UMNO)	BN (UMNO)	BN (UMNO)	BN (UMNO)	BN (UMNO)	BN (UMNO)	BN (UMNO)	BN (UMNO)	PN (PPBM)
Perak	Larut					BN (UMNO)	BN (UMNO)	BN (UMNO)	BN (UMNO)	BN (UMNO)	BN (UMNO)	BN (UMNO)	BN (UMNO)	BN (UMNO)	BN (UMNO)	BN (UMNO)	PN (PPBM)
Perak	Larut-Matang	Alliance (MCA)															
Perak	Larut Selatan		Alliance (MCA)	Alliance (MCA)	Gerakan												
Perak	Larut Utara		Alliance (UMNO)	Alliance (UMNO)	Alliance (UMNO)												
Perak	Lenggong												BN (UMNO)	BN (UMNO)	BN (UMNO)	BN (UMNO)	BN (UMNO)
Perak	Lumut					BN (MCA)	BN (MCA)	BN (MCA)	BN (MCA)	BN (MCA)	BN (MCA)	BN (MCA)	BN (MCA)	BN (MCA)	PR (PKR)	PH (Amanah)	PN (PPBM)
Perak	Matang					BN (UMNO)	BN (UMNO)	BN (UMNO)									
Perak	Menglembu		PPP	PPP	PPP	DAP	DAP	BN (MCA)									
Perak	Padang Rengas					BN (UMNO)	BN (UMNO)	BN (UMNO)					BN (UMNO)	BN (UMNO)	BN (UMNO)	BN (UMNO)	PN (PPBM)
Perak	Parit		Alliance (UMNO)	Alliance (UMNO)	PAS	BN (UMNO)	BN (UMNO)	BN (UMNO)	BN (UMNO)	BN (UMNO)	BN (UMNO)	BA (PAS)	BN (UMNO)	BN (UMNO)	BN (UMNO)	BN (UMNO)	PN (PAS)
Perak	Parit Buntar					BN (UMNO)	BN (UMNO)	BN (UMNO)	BN (UMNO)	BN (UMNO)	BN (UMNO)	BA (PAS)	BN (UMNO)	PR (PAS)	PR (PAS)	PH (Amanah)	PN (PAS)
Perak	Pasir Pinji								DAP	GR (DAP)							
Perak	Pasir Salak								BN (UMNO)	BN (UMNO)	BN (UMNO)	BN (UMNO)	BN (UMNO)	BN (UMNO)	BN (UMNO)	BN (UMNO)	PN (PAS)
Perak	Sitiawan		Alliance (MCA)	Alliance (MCA)	DAP												
Perak	Sungai Siput		Alliance (MIC)	Alliance (MIC)	Alliance (MIC)	BN (MIC)	BN (MIC)	BN (MIC)	BN (MIC)	BN (MIC)	BN (MIC)	BN (MIC)	BN (MIC)	PR (PKR)	PR (PKR)	PH (PKR)	PH (PKR)
Perak	Sungei Perak Hilir	Alliance (UMNO)															
Perak	Sungei Perak Ulu	Alliance (UMNO)															
Perak	Taiping					BN (Gerakan)	BN (Gerakan)	BN (Gerakan)	BN (Gerakan)	BN (Gerakan)	BN (Gerakan)	BN (Gerakan)	BN (PPP)	PR (DAP)	PR (DAP)	PH (DAP)	PH (DAP)
Perak	Tambun								BN (UMNO)	BN (UMNO)	BN (UMNO)	BN (UMNO)	BN (UMNO)	BN (UMNO)	BN (UMNO)	PH (PPBM)	PH (PKR)
Perak	Tanjong Malim		Alliance (MCA)	Alliance (MCA)	Alliance (MCA)	BN (MCA)	BN (MCA)	BN (MCA)	BN (MCA)	BN (MCA)	BN (MCA)	BN (MCA)	BN (MCA)	BN (MCA)	BN (MCA)	PH (PKR)	PH (PKR)
Perak	Tapah								BN (MIC)	BN (MIC)	BN (MIC)	BN (MIC)	BN (MIC)	BN (MIC)	BN (MIC)	BN (MIC)	BN (MIC)
Perak	Tasek Chenderoh								BN (UMNO)	BN (UMNO)							
Perak	Telok Anson	Alliance (UMNO)	Alliance (MCA)	Alliance (MCA)	DAP	BN (Gerakan)	BN (Gerakan)	BN (Gerakan)									
Perak	Teluk Intan								BN (Gerakan)	BN (Gerakan)	BN (Gerakan)	BN (Gerakan)	BN (Gerakan)	PR (DAP)	PR (DAP)	PH (DAP)	PH (DAP)
Perak	Ulu Kinta		PPP	Alliance (MCA)	PPP												
Perak	Ulu Perak		Alliance (UMNO)	Alliance (UMNO)	Alliance (UMNO)												
Pahang	Bentong		Alliance (MCA)	Alliance (MCA)	Alliance (MCA)	BN (MCA)	BN (MCA)	BN (MCA)	BN (MCA)	BN (MCA)	BN (MCA)	BN (MCA)	BN (MCA)	BN (MCA)	BN (MCA)	PH (DAP)	PH (DAP)
Pahang	Bera												BN (UMNO)	BN (UMNO)	BN (UMNO)	BN (UMNO)	BN (UMNO)
Pahang	Cameron Highlands												BN (MIC)	BN (MIC)	BN (MIC)	BN (MIC)	BN (UMNO)
Pahang	Indera Mahkota												BN (UMNO)	PR (PKR)	PR (PKR)	PH (PKR)	PN (PPBM)
Pahang	Jerantut					BN (UMNO)	BN (UMNO)	BN (UMNO)	BN (UMNO)	BN (UMNO)	BN (UMNO)	BN (UMNO)	BN (UMNO)	BN (UMNO)	BN (UMNO)	BN (UMNO)	PN (PAS)
Pahang	Kuala Krau												BN (UMNO)	BN (UMNO)	BN (UMNO)	BN (UMNO)	PN (PAS)
Pahang	Kuantan		Alliance (UMNO)	Alliance (UMNO)	Alliance (UMNO)	BN (UMNO)	BN (UMNO)	BN (UMNO)	BN (UMNO)	BN (UMNO)	BN (UMNO)	BN (UMNO)	BN (MCA)	PR (PKR)	PR (PKR)	PH (PKR)	PN (PAS)
Pahang	Lipis		Alliance (UMNO)	Alliance (UMNO)	Alliance (UMNO)	BN (UMNO)	BN (UMNO)	BN (UMNO)	BN (MCA)	BN (MCA)	BN (UMNO)	BN (UMNO)	BN (UMNO)	BN (UMNO)	BN (UMNO)	BN (UMNO)	BN (UMNO)
Pahang	Maran					BN (UMNO)	BN (UMNO)	BN (UMNO)	BN (UMNO)	BN (UMNO)	BN (UMNO)	BN (UMNO)	BN (UMNO)	BN (UMNO)	BN (UMNO)	BN (UMNO)	PN (PAS)
Pahang	Mentakab								BN (UMNO)	BN (UMNO)	BN (MCA)	BN (MCA)					
Pahang	Pahang Timor	Alliance (UMNO)															
Pahang	Paya Besar										BN (UMNO)	BN (UMNO)	BN (UMNO)	BN (UMNO)	BN (UMNO)	BN (UMNO)	BN (UMNO)
Pahang	Pekan		Alliance (UMNO)	Alliance (UMNO)	Alliance (UMNO)	BN (UMNO)	BN (UMNO)	BN (UMNO)	BN (UMNO)	BN (UMNO)	BN (UMNO)	BN (UMNO)	BN (UMNO)	BN (UMNO)	BN (UMNO)	BN (UMNO)	BN (UMNO)
Pahang	Raub		Alliance (UMNO)	Alliance (UMNO)	Alliance (UMNO)	BN (UMNO)	BN (MCA)	BN (MCA)	BN (MCA)	BN (MCA)	BN (MCA)	BN (MCA)	BN (MCA)	BN (MCA)	PR (DAP)	PH (DAP)	PH (DAP)
Pahang	Rompin								BN (UMNO)	BN (UMNO)	BN (UMNO)	BN (UMNO)	BN (UMNO)	BN (UMNO)	BN (UMNO)	BN (UMNO)	PN (PPBM)
Pahang	Semantan	Alliance (UMNO)															
Pahang	Temerloh		Alliance (UMNO)	Alliance (UMNO)	Alliance (UMNO)	BN (UMNO)	BN (UMNO)	BN (UMNO)	BN (UMNO)	BN (UMNO)	BN (UMNO)	BN (UMNO)	BN (UMNO)	BN (UMNO)	PR (PAS)	PH (Amanah)	PN (PAS)
Pahang	Ulu Pahang	Alliance (UMNO)															
Selangor	Ampang												BN (UMNO)	PR (PKR)	PR (PKR)	PH (PKR)	PH (PKR)
Selangor	Ampang Jaya								BN (MCA)	BN (MCA)	BN (MCA)	BN (MCA)					
Selangor	Bangi															PH (DAP)	PH (DAP)
Selangor	Batu		SF (Lab)	SF (Lab)	Gerakan												
Selangor	Bukit Bintang		Alliance (MCA)	Alliance (MCA)	Gerakan												
Selangor	Bangsar		SF (Lab)	PAP	DAP												
Selangor	Damansara		SF (Ra'ayat)	Alliance (MCA)	DAP											PH (DAP)	PH (PKR)
Selangor	Gombak										BN (UMNO)	BN (UMNO)	BN (UMNO)	PR (PKR)	PR (PKR)	PH (PKR)	PH (PKR)
Selangor	Hulu Langat					BN (MCA)	BN (MCA)	BN (MCA)	BN (MCA)	BN (MCA)	BN (UMNO)	BN (UMNO)	BN (UMNO)	PR (PAS)	PR (PAS)	PH (Amanah)	PH (Amanah)
Selangor	Hulu Selangor	Alliance (UMNO)	Alliance (MCA)	Alliance (MCA)	Alliance (MCA)	BN (MCA)	BN (MCA)	BN (MCA)	BN (MIC)	BN (MIC)	BN (MIC)	BN (MIC)	BN (MIC)	PR (PKR)	BN (MIC)	PH (PKR)	PN (PAS)
Selangor	Kapar		Alliance (UMNO)	Alliance (UMNO)	Alliance (UMNO)				BN (MIC)	BN (MIC)	BN (MIC)	BN (MIC)	BN (MIC)	PR (PKR)	PR (PKR)	PH (PKR)	PN (PAS)
Selangor	Kelana Jaya												BN (MCA)	PR (PKR)	PR (PKR)		
Selangor	Klang		Alliance (MIC)	Alliance (MIC)	Alliance (MIC)				BN (MCA)	GR (DAP)	BN (MCA)	BN (MCA)	BN (MCA)	PR (DAP)	PR (DAP)	PH (DAP)	PH (DAP)
Selangor	Kota Raja												BN (MIC)	PR (PAS)	PR (PAS)	PH (Amanah)	PH (Amanah)
Selangor	Kuala Langat		Alliance (UMNO)	Alliance (UMNO)	Alliance (UMNO)	BN (UMNO)	BN (UMNO)	BN (UMNO)	BN (UMNO)	BN (UMNO)	BN (UMNO)	BN (UMNO)	BN (UMNO)	PR (PKR)	PR (PKR)	PH (PKR)	PN (PAS)
Selangor	Kuala Lumpur Barat	Alliance (MCA)															
Selangor	Kuala Lumpur Timor	Alliance (MCA)															
Selangor	Kuala Selangor	Alliance (UMNO)	Alliance (UMNO)	Alliance (UMNO)	Alliance (UMNO)	BN (UMNO)	BN (UMNO)	BN (UMNO)	BN (UMNO)	BN (UMNO)	BN (UMNO)	BN (UMNO)	BN (UMNO)	PR (PAS)	BN (UMNO)	PH (Amanah)	PH (Amanah)
Selangor	Langat	Alliance (UMNO)	Alliance (UMNO)	Alliance (UMNO)	Alliance (UMNO)												
Selangor	Pandan												BN (MCA)	BN (MCA)	PR (PKR)	PH (PKR)	PH (PKR)
Selangor	Pelabuhan Kelang					BN (MIC)	BN (MIC)	BN (MIC)									
Selangor	Petaling					DAP	DAP	BN (MCA)									
Selangor	Petaling Jaya								DAP	GR (DAP)						PH (PKR)	PH (PKR)
Selangor	Petaling Jaya Selatan										BN (MCA)	BN (MCA)	BN (MCA)	PR (PKR)	PR (PKR)		
Selangor	Petaling Jaya Utara										BN (MCA)	BN (MCA)	BN (MCA)	PR (DAP)	PR (DAP)		
Selangor	Puchong								DAP	GR (DAP)			BN (Gerakan)	PR (DAP)	PR (DAP)	PH (DAP)	PH (DAP)
Selangor	Rawang		SF (Lab)	Alliance (UMNO)	Alliance (UMNO)												
Selangor	Sabak Bernam		Alliance (UMNO)	Alliance (UMNO)	Alliance (UMNO)	BN (UMNO)	BN (UMNO)	BN (UMNO)	BN (UMNO)	BN (UMNO)	BN (UMNO)	BN (UMNO)	BN (UMNO)	BN (UMNO)	BN (UMNO)	BN (UMNO)	PN (PPBM)
Selangor	Selangor Barat	Alliance (UMNO)															
Selangor	Selangor Tengah	Alliance (MCA)															
Selangor	Selayang					BN (MCA)	BN (UMNO)	BN (UMNO)	BN (UMNO)	BN (UMNO)	BN (MCA)	BN (MCA)	BN (MCA)	PR (PKR)	PR (PKR)	PH (PKR)	PH (PKR)
Selangor	Sepang		Alliance (MCA)	Alliance (MCA)	Alliance (MCA)	BN (UMNO)	BN (UMNO)	BN (UMNO)	BN (UMNO)	BN (UMNO)	BN (UMNO)	BN (UMNO)	BN (UMNO)	BN (UMNO)	PR (PAS)	PH (Amanah)	PH (Amanah)
Selangor	Serdang										BN (MCA)	BN (MCA)	BN (MCA)	PR (DAP)	PR (DAP)		
Selangor	Setapak		SF (Ra'ayat)	Alliance (MCA)	DAP												
Selangor	Shah Alam					BN (MCA)	BN (MCA)	BN (MCA)	BN (UMNO)	BN (UMNO)	BN (UMNO)	BN (UMNO)	BN (UMNO)	PR (PAS)	PR (PAS)	PH (Amanah)	PH (Amanah)
Selangor	Subang										BN (MIC)	BN (MIC)	BN (MIC)	PR (PKR)	PR (PKR)	PH (PKR)	PH (PKR)
Selangor	Sungai Besar												BN (UMNO)	BN (UMNO)	BN (UMNO)	PH (PPBM)	PN (PPBM)
Selangor	Sungai Buloh															PH (PKR)	PH (PKR)
Selangor	Tanjong Karang					BN (UMNO)	BN (UMNO)	BN (UMNO)	BN (UMNO)	BN (UMNO)	BN (UMNO)	BN (UMNO)	BN (UMNO)	BN (UMNO)	BN (UMNO)	BN (UMNO)	PN (PPBM)
Federal Territory	Bandar Tun Razak										BN (MCA)	BN (MCA)	BN (MCA)	PR (PKR)	PR (PKR)	PH (PKR)	PH (PKR)
Federal Territory	Batu								BN (Gerakan)	BN (Gerakan)	BN (Gerakan)	BN (Gerakan)	BN (Gerakan)	PR (PKR)	PR (PKR)	IND	PH (PKR)
Federal Territory	Bukit Bintang								DAP	GR (DAP)	GR (DAP)	BA (DAP)	DAP	PR (DAP)	PR (DAP)	PH (DAP)	PH (DAP)
Federal Territory	Cheras										GR (DAP)	BA (DAP)	DAP	PR (DAP)	PR (DAP)	PH (DAP)	PH (DAP)
Federal Territory	Damansara					BN (MIC)	DAP	BN (MCA)									
Federal Territory	Kepong					Pekemas	BN (Gerakan)	DAP	DAP	GR (DAP)	GR (DAP)	BA (DAP)	DAP	PR (DAP)	PR (DAP)	PH (DAP)	PH (DAP)
Federal Territory	Kuala Lumpur Bandar					DAP	DAP	DAP									
Federal Territory	Labuan								IND	BN (UMNO)	BN (UMNO)	BN (UMNO)	BN (UMNO)	BN (UMNO)	BN (UMNO)	BN (UMNO)	PN (PPBM)
Federal Territory	Lembah Pantai								BN (UMNO)	BN (UMNO)	BN (UMNO)	BN (UMNO)	BN (UMNO)	PR (PKR)	PR (PKR)	PH (PKR)	PH (PKR)
Federal Territory	Putrajaya												BN (UMNO)	BN (UMNO)	BN (UMNO)	BN (UMNO)	PN (PPBM)
Federal Territory	Segambut										BN (Gerakan)	BN (Gerakan)	BN (Gerakan)	PR (DAP)	PR (DAP)	PH (DAP)	PH (DAP)
Federal Territory	Seputeh								DAP	GR (DAP)	GR (DAP)	BA (DAP)	DAP	PR (DAP)	PR (DAP)	PH (DAP)	PH (DAP)
Federal Territory	Setapak					BN (UMNO)	BN (UMNO)	BN (UMNO)									
Federal Territory	Setiawangsa												BN (UMNO)	BN (UMNO)	BN (UMNO)	PH (PKR)	PH (PKR)
Federal Territory	Sungai Besi					DAP	DAP	DAP	DAP	GR (DAP)							
Federal Territory	Titiwangsa								BN (UMNO)	BN (UMNO)	BN (UMNO)	BN (UMNO)	BN (UMNO)	PR (PAS)	BN (UMNO)	PH (PPBM)	BN (UMNO)
Federal Territory	Wangsa Maju										BN (UMNO)	BN (UMNO)	BN (MCA)	PR (PKR)	PR (PKR)	PH (PKR)	PH (PKR)
Negeri Sembilan	Jelebu					BN (UMNO)	BN (UMNO)	BN (UMNO)	BN (UMNO)	BN (UMNO)	BN (UMNO)	BN (UMNO)	BN (UMNO)	BN (UMNO)	BN (UMNO)	BN (UMNO)	BN (UMNO)
Negeri Sembilan	Jelebu-Jempol		Alliance (UMNO)	Alliance (UMNO)	Alliance (UMNO)												
Negeri Sembilan	Jempol								Alliance (UMNO)	BN (UMNO)	BN (UMNO)	BN (UMNO)	BN (UMNO)	BN (UMNO)	BN (UMNO)	BN (UMNO)	BN (UMNO)
Negeri Sembilan	Kuala Pilah		Alliance (UMNO)	Alliance (UMNO)	Alliance (UMNO)	BN (UMNO)	BN (UMNO)	BN (UMNO)	BN (UMNO)	BN (UMNO)	BN (UMNO)	BN (UMNO)	BN (UMNO)	BN (UMNO)	BN (UMNO)	PH (PPBM)	BN (UMNO)
Negeri Sembilan	Mantin					BN (MCA)	BN (MCA)	BN (MCA)									
Negeri Sembilan	Negri Sembilan Selatan	Alliance (UMNO)															
Negeri Sembilan	Negri Sembilan Utara	Alliance (UMNO)															
Negeri Sembilan	Port Dickson		Alliance (MIC)	Alliance (MIC)	DAP											PH (PKR)	PH (PKR)
Negeri Sembilan	Rasah								DAP	BN (MCA)	BN (MCA)	BN (MCA)	BN (MCA)	PR (DAP)	PR (DAP)	PH (DAP)	PH (DAP)
Negeri Sembilan	Rembau												BN (UMNO)	BN (UMNO)	BN (UMNO)	BN (UMNO)	BN (UMNO)
Negeri Sembilan	Rembau-Tampin		Alliance (UMNO)	Alliance (UMNO)	Alliance (UMNO)												
Negeri Sembilan	Seremban	Alliance (MCA)				DAP	DAP	BN (MCA)	DAP	BN (MCA)	BN (MCA)	BN (MCA)	BN (MCA)	PR (DAP)	PR (DAP)	PH (DAP)	PH (DAP)
Negeri Sembilan	Seremban Barat		IND	Alliance (MCA)	DAP												
Negeri Sembilan	Seremban Timor		IND	Alliance (MCA)	DAP												
Negeri Sembilan	Tampin					BN (UMNO)	BN (UMNO)	BN (UMNO)	BN (UMNO)	BN (UMNO)	BN (UMNO)	BN (UMNO)	BN (UMNO)	BN (UMNO)	BN (UMNO)	PH (Amanah)	BN (UMNO)
Negeri Sembilan	Telok Kemang					BN (MIC)	BN (MIC)	BN (MIC)	BN (MIC)	BN (MIC)	BN (MIC)	BN (MIC)	BN (MIC)	PR (PKR)	PR (PKR)		
Malacca	Alor Gajah					BN (UMNO)	BN (UMNO)	BN (UMNO)	BN (UMNO)	BN (UMNO)	BN (UMNO)	BN (UMNO)	BN (MCA)	BN (MCA)	BN (MCA)	PH (PPBM)	PH (Amanah)
Malacca	Bandar Malacca		MP	Alliance (MCA)	DAP												
Malacca	Batu Berendam					BN (MCA)	BN (MCA)	BN (MCA)	BN (UMNO)	BN (UMNO)	BN (UMNO)	BN (UMNO)					
Malacca	Bukit Katil												BN (UMNO)	BN (UMNO)	PR (PKR)		
Malacca	Hang Tuah Jaya															PH (PKR)	PH (PKR)
Malacca	Jasin					BN (UMNO)	BN (UMNO)	BN (UMNO)	BN (UMNO)	BN (UMNO)	BN (UMNO)	BN (UMNO)	BN (UMNO)	BN (UMNO)	BN (UMNO)	BN (UMNO)	PN (PAS)
Malacca	Kota Melaka					DAP	DAP	DAP	DAP	GR (DAP)	GR (DAP)	BA (DAP)	BN (MCA)	PR (DAP)	PR (DAP)	PH (DAP)	PH (DAP)
Malacca	Malacca Central	Alliance (MCA)															
Malacca	Malacca Luar	Alliance (UMNO)															
Malacca	Malacca Selatan		Alliance (UMNO)	Alliance (UMNO)	Alliance (UMNO)												
Malacca	Malacca Tengah		Alliance (MCA)	Alliance (MCA)	Alliance (UMNO)												
Malacca	Malacca Utara		Alliance (UMNO)	Alliance (UMNO)	Alliance (UMNO)												
Malacca	Masjid Tanah												BN (UMNO)	BN (UMNO)	BN (UMNO)	BN (UMNO)	PN (PPBM)
Malacca	Selandar								BN (MCA)	BN (MCA)	BN (MCA)	BN (MCA)					
Malacca	Tangga Batu												BN (UMNO)	BN (UMNO)	BN (UMNO)	PH (PKR)	PN (PAS)
Johor	Ayer Hitam					BN (MCA)	BN (MCA)	BN (MCA)					BN (MCA)	BN (MCA)	BN (MCA)	BN (MCA)	BN (MCA)
Johor	Bakri								BN (MCA)	BN (MCA)	BN (MCA)	BN (MCA)	BN (MCA)	PR (DAP)	PR (DAP)	PH (DAP)	PH (DAP)
Johor	Batu Pahat	Alliance (MIC)	Alliance (MCA)	Alliance (MCA)	Alliance (MCA)	BN (UMNO)	BN (UMNO)	BN (UMNO)	BN (UMNO)	BN (UMNO)	BN (UMNO)	BN (UMNO)	BN (UMNO)	BN (UMNO)	PR (PKR)	PH (PKR)	PH (PKR)
Johor	Batu Pahat Dalam		Alliance (UMNO)	Alliance (UMNO)	Alliance (UMNO)												
Johor	Gelang Patah											BN (MCA)	BN (MCA)	BN (MCA)	PR (DAP)		
Johor	Iskandar Puteri															PH (DAP)	PH (DAP)
Johor	Johor Bahru	Alliance (UMNO)				BN (UMNO)	BN (UMNO)	BN (UMNO)	BN (UMNO)	BN (UMNO)	BN (UMNO)	BN (UMNO)	BN (UMNO)	BN (UMNO)	BN (UMNO)	PH (PKR)	PH (PKR)
Johor	Johore Bahru Barat		Alliance (UMNO)	Alliance (UMNO)	Alliance (UMNO)												
Johor	Johore Bahru Timor		Alliance (UMNO)	Alliance (UMNO)	Alliance (UMNO)												
Johor	Johore Selatan	Alliance (MCA)															
Johor	Johore Tengah	Alliance (MCA)															
Johor	Johore Tenggara		Alliance (UMNO)	Alliance (UMNO)	Alliance (UMNO)												
Johor	Johore Timor	Alliance (UMNO)	Alliance (UMNO)	Alliance (UMNO)	Alliance (UMNO)												
Johor	Kluang					BN (MCA)	DAP	BN (MCA)	BN (MCA)	BN (MCA)	BN (MCA)	BN (MCA)	BN (MCA)	BN (MCA)	PR (DAP)	PH (DAP)	PH (DAP)
Johor	Kluang Selatan		Alliance (MCA)	Alliance (MCA)	Alliance (MCA)												
Johor	Kluang Utara		Alliance (MCA)	Alliance (MCA)	Alliance (MCA)												
Johor	Kota Tinggi								BN (UMNO)	BN (UMNO)	BN (UMNO)	BN (UMNO)	BN (UMNO)	BN (UMNO)	BN (UMNO)	BN (UMNO)	BN (UMNO)
Johor	Kulai												BN (MCA)	BN (MCA)	PR (DAP)	PH (DAP)	PH (DAP)
Johor	Labis					BN (UMNO)	BN (UMNO)	BN (UMNO)	BN (MCA)	BN (MCA)	BN (MCA)	BN (MCA)	BN (MCA)	BN (MCA)	BN (MCA)	PH (DAP)	PH (DAP)
Johor	Ledang					BN (UMNO)	BN (UMNO)	BN (UMNO)	BN (UMNO)	BN (UMNO)	BN (UMNO)	BN (UMNO)	BN (UMNO)	BN (UMNO)	BN (UMNO)	PH (PKR)	PH (PKR)
Johor	Mersing								BN (UMNO)	BN (UMNO)	BN (UMNO)	BN (UMNO)	BN (UMNO)	BN (UMNO)	BN (UMNO)	BN (UMNO)	PN (PPBM)
Johor	Muar					BN (MCA)	BN (MCA)	BN (MCA)	BN (UMNO)	BN (UMNO)	BN (UMNO)	BN (UMNO)	BN (UMNO)	BN (UMNO)	BN (UMNO)	PH (PPBM)	MUDA
Johor	Muar Dalam		Alliance (UMNO)	Alliance (UMNO)	Alliance (UMNO)												
Johor	Muar Pantai		Alliance (MCA)	Alliance (MCA)	Alliance (MCA)												
Johor	Muar Selatan	Alliance (MCA)	Alliance (UMNO)	Alliance (UMNO)	Alliance (UMNO)												
Johor	Muar Utara	Alliance (UMNO)	Alliance (UMNO)	Alliance (UMNO)	Alliance (UMNO)												
Johor	Pagoh					BN (UMNO)	BN (UMNO)	BN (UMNO)	BN (UMNO)	BN (UMNO)	BN (UMNO)	BN (UMNO)	BN (UMNO)	BN (UMNO)	BN (UMNO)	PH (PPBM)	PN (PPBM)
Johor	Panti					BN (UMNO)	BN (UMNO)	BN (UMNO)									
Johor	Parit Sulong								BN (UMNO)	BN (UMNO)	BN (UMNO)	BN (UMNO)	BN (UMNO)	BN (UMNO)	BN (UMNO)	BN (UMNO)	BN (UMNO)
Johor	Pasir Gudang												BN (UMNO)	BN (UMNO)	BN (UMNO)	PH (PKR)	PH (PKR)
Johor	Pengerang												BN (UMNO)	BN (UMNO)	BN (UMNO)	BN (UMNO)	BN (UMNO)
Johor	Pontian					BN (UMNO)	BN (UMNO)	BN (UMNO)	BN (MCA)	BN (MCA)	BN (MCA)	BN (MCA)	BN (UMNO)	BN (UMNO)	BN (UMNO)	BN (UMNO)	BN (UMNO)
Johor	Pontian Selatan		Alliance (UMNO)	Alliance (UMNO)	Alliance (UMNO)												
Johor	Pontian Utara		Alliance (UMNO)	Alliance (UMNO)	Alliance (UMNO)												
Johor	Pulai					BN (UMNO)	BN (UMNO)	BN (UMNO)	BN (UMNO)	BN (UMNO)	BN (UMNO)	BN (UMNO)	BN (UMNO)	BN (UMNO)	BN (UMNO)	PH (Amanah)	PH (Amanah)
Johor	Renggam					BN (MCA)	BN (MCA)	BN (MCA)									
Johor	Segamat	Alliance (UMNO)				BN (MCA)	BN (MCA)	BN (MIC)	BN (MIC)	BN (MIC)	BN (MIC)	BN (MIC)	BN (MIC)	BN (MIC)	BN (MIC)	PH (PKR)	PH (PKR)
Johor	Segamat Selatan		Alliance (MCA)	Alliance (MCA)	Alliance (MCA)												
Johor	Segamat Utara		Alliance (UMNO)	Alliance (UMNO)	Alliance (UMNO)												
Johor	Sekijang												BN (UMNO)	BN (UMNO)	BN (UMNO)	PH (PKR)	PH (PKR)
Johor	Sembrong												BN (UMNO)	BN (UMNO)	BN (UMNO)	BN (UMNO)	BN (UMNO)
Johor	Semerah					BN (UMNO)	BN (UMNO)	BN (UMNO)									
Johor	Senai								BN (MCA)	BN (MCA)	BN (MCA)	BN (MCA)					
Johor	Simpang Renggam												BN (Gerakan)	BN (Gerakan)	BN (Gerakan)	PH (PPBM)	BN (UMNO)
Johor	Sri Gading					BN (UMNO)	BN (UMNO)	BN (UMNO)	BN (UMNO)	BN (UMNO)	BN (UMNO)	BN (UMNO)	BN (UMNO)	BN (UMNO)	BN (UMNO)	PH (PPBM)	PH (Amanah)
Johor	Sungai Benut								BN (UMNO)	BN (UMNO)	BN (UMNO)	BN (UMNO)					
Johor	Tanjong Piai												BN (MCA)	BN (MCA)	BN (MCA)	PH (PPBM)	BN (MCA)
Johor	Tebrau								BN (UMNO)	BN (UMNO)	BN (UMNO)	BN (UMNO)	BN (MCA)	BN (MCA)	BN (MCA)	PH (PKR)	PH (PKR)
Johor	Tenggara										BN (UMNO)	BN (UMNO)	BN (UMNO)	BN (UMNO)	BN (UMNO)	BN (UMNO)	BN (UMNO)
Johor	Tenggaroh					BN (UMNO)	BN (UMNO)	BN (UMNO)									
Sabah	Bandau				USNO	BN (USNO)	BN (BERJAYA)	BN (BERJAYA)	BN (PBS)	GR (PBS)	GR (PBS)	PBS					
Sabah	Batu Sapi												BN (PBS)	BN (PBS)	BN (PBS)	WARISAN	GRS
Sabah	Beaufort										BN (UMNO)	BN (UMNO)	BN (UMNO)	BN (UMNO)	BN (UMNO)	BN (UMNO)	BN (UMNO)
Sabah	Beluran										BN (UMNO)	BN (UMNO)	BN (UMNO)	BN (UMNO)	BN (UMNO)	BN (UMNO)	PN (PPBM)
Sabah	Darvel				USNO												
Sabah	Gaya					BN (SCA)	BN (BERJAYA)	BN (BERJAYA)	DAP	GR (PBS)	BN (SAPP)	BN (SAPP)					
Sabah	Hilir Padas					BN (USNO)	BN (USNO)	IND									
Sabah	Jambongan								BN (PBS)	GR (PBS)							
Sabah	Kalabakan												BN (UMNO)	BN (UMNO)	BN (UMNO)	WARISAN	BN (UMNO)
Sabah	Keningau					BN (USNO)	BN (BERJAYA)	BN (BERJAYA)	BN (PBS)	GR (PBS)	GR (PBS)	PBS	BN (PBS)	BN (PBS)	BN (PBS)	STAR	GRS (STAR)
Sabah	Kimanis				USNO	BN (USNO)	IND	BN (BERJAYA)	BN (USNO)	GR (PBS)			BN (UMNO)	BN (UMNO)	BN (UMNO)	BN (UMNO)	BN (UMNO)
Sabah	Kinabalu				USNO	BN (USNO)	BN (BERJAYA)	BN (BERJAYA)	BN (USNO)	GR (PBS)	GR (PBS)	BN (UPKO)					
Sabah	Kinabatangan				USNO	BN (USNO)	BN (BERJAYA)	BN (BERJAYA)	BN (USNO)	BN (USNO)	BN (UMNO)	BN (UMNO)	BN (UMNO)	BN (UMNO)	BN (UMNO)	BN (UMNO)	BN (UMNO)
Sabah	Kota Belud				USNO	BN (USNO)	BN (USNO)	IND	BN (PBS)	GR (PBS)	BN (UMNO)	BN (UMNO)	BN (UMNO)	BN (UMNO)	BN (UMNO)	WARISAN	WARISAN
Sabah	Kota Kinabalu				SCA								BN (PBS)	PR (DAP)	PR (DAP)	PH (DAP)	PH (DAP)
Sabah	Kota Marudu												BN (PBS)	BN (PBS)	BN (PBS)	BN (PBS)	KDM
Sabah	Kudat												BN (UMNO)	BN (UMNO)	BN (UMNO)	BN (UMNO)	IND
Sabah	Labuan-Beaufort				USNO												
Sabah	Labuk-Sugut				USNO	BN (USNO)	BN (USNO)	IND									
Sabah	Lahad Datu																WARISAN
Sabah	Libaran										BN (UMNO)	BN (UMNO)	BN (UMNO)	BN (UMNO)	BN (UMNO)	BN (UMNO)	BN (UMNO)
Sabah	Limbawang								BN (USNO)	BN (USNO)							
Sabah	Marudu				USNO	BN (USNO)	BN (USNO)	IND	IND	BN (USNO)	GR (PBS)	BN (UMNO)					
Sabah	Padas								BN (PBS)	GR (PBS)							
Sabah	Papar								BN (USNO)	BN (USNO)	BN (UMNO)	BN (UMNO)	BN (UMNO)	BN (UMNO)	BN (UMNO)	WARISAN	GRS
Sabah	Penampang				USNO	BN (USNO)	BN (BERJAYA)	BN (BERJAYA)	BN (PBS)	GR (PBS)	GR (PBS)	BN (UPKO)	BN (UPKO)	BN (UPKO)	PR (PKR)	WARISAN	PH (UPKO)
Sabah	Pensiangan								BN (PBS)	GR (PBS)			BN (PBRS)	BN (PBRS)	BN (PBRS)	BN (PBRS)	BN (PBRS)
Sabah	Putatan												BN (UPKO)	BN (UPKO)	BN (UPKO)	PH (PKR)	BN (UMNO)
Sabah	Ranau												BN (UPKO)	BN (UPKO)	BN (UPKO)	PH (PKR)	GRS
Sabah	Sabah Dalam				USNO												
Sabah	Sabah Selatan				USNO												
Sabah	Sandakan				SCA	BN (SCA)	DAP	DAP	DAP	GR (PBS)	BN (LDP)	BN (LDP)	IND	BN (LDP)	PR (DAP)	PH (DAP)	PH (DAP)
Sabah	Semporna								BN (USNO)	BN (USNO)	BN (UMNO)	BN (UMNO)	BN (UMNO)	BN (UMNO)	BN (UMNO)	WARISAN	WARISAN
Sabah	Sepanggar												BN (SAPP)	BN (SAPP)	BN (UMNO)	WARISAN	PH (PKR)
Sabah	Silam					BN (USNO)	BN (USNO)	IND	BN (USNO)	BN (USNO)	BN (UMNO)	BN (UMNO)	BN (UMNO)	BN (UMNO)	BN (UMNO)	WARISAN	
Sabah	Sipitang										BN (UMNO)	BN (UMNO)	BN (UMNO)	BN (UMNO)	BN (UMNO)	BN (UMNO)	GRS
Sabah	Tanjong Aru								DAP	GR (PBS)	GR (PBS)	PBS					
Sabah	Tawau				SCA	BN (SCA)	BN (BERJAYA)	BN (BERJAYA)	DAP	GR (PBS)	BN (SAPP)	BN (SAPP)	BN (SAPP)	BN (SAPP)	BN (PBS)	PH (PKR)	GRS (PBS)
Sabah	Tenom										GR (PBS)	BN (UMNO)	BN (UMNO)	BN (UMNO)	BN (UMNO)	PH (DAP)	IND
Sabah	Tuaran				USNO	BN (USNO)	BN (BERJAYA)	BN (BERJAYA)	BN (USNO)	GR (PBS)	GR (PBS)	BN (UPKO)	BN (UPKO)	BN (UPKO)	BN (UPKO)	BN (UPKO)	PH (UPKO)
Sabah	Ulu Padas					BN (USNO)	BN (BERJAYA)	BN (BERJAYA)									
Sarawak	Bandar Kuching				SUPP	BN (SUPP)	BN (SUPP)	DAP	DAP	GR (DAP)	BN (SUPP)	BN (SUPP)	DAP	PR (DAP)	PR (DAP)	PH (DAP)	PH (DAP)
Sarawak	Bandar Sibu				SUPP	BN (SUPP)											
Sarawak	Baram				SNAP	SNAP	BN (SNAP)	BN (SNAP)	BN (SNAP)	IND	BN (SNAP)	BN (SNAP)	BN (SPDP)	BN (SPDP)	BN (SPDP)	BN (PDP)	GPS (PDP)
Sarawak	Batang Lupar				SNAP	SNAP	BN (SNAP)	IND	BN (PBDS)	BN (PBB)	BN (PBB)	BN (PBB)	BN (PBB)	BN (PBB)	BN (PBB)	BN (PBB)	GPS (PBB)
Sarawak	Batang Sadong									BN (PBB)	BN (PBB)	BN (PBB)	BN (PBB)	BN (PBB)	BN (PBB)	BN (PBB)	GPS (PBB)
Sarawak	Bau-Lundu				SUPP	SNAP											
Sarawak	Betong				SNAP	BN (PBB)	BN (PBB)	BN (PBB)	BN (PBB)	BN (PBB)	BN (PBB)	BN (PBB)	BN (PBB)	BN (PBB)	BN (PBB)	BN (PBB)	GPS (PBB)
Sarawak	Bintulu				SCA	SNAP	BN (SNAP)	BN (SNAP)	BN (SNAP)	BN (SNAP)	GR (DAP)	BN (SNAP)	BN (SPDP)	BN (SPDP)	BN (SPDP)	BN (PDP)	GPS (PDP)
Sarawak	Bukit Mas						BN (PBB)	BN (PBB)	BN (PBB)	BN (PBB)	BN (PBB)	BN (PBB)	BN (PBB)				
Sarawak	Hulu Rajang				PESAKA	SNAP	BN (SNAP)	BN (SNAP)	BN (SNAP)	IND	BN (PBDS)	BN (PRS)	BN (PRS)	BN (PRS)	BN (PRS)	BN (PRS)	GPS (PRS)
Sarawak	Igan													BN (PBB)	BN (PBB)	BN (PBB)	GPS (PBB)
Sarawak	Julau				PESAKA	SNAP	BN (SNAP)	BN (SNAP)	BN (PBDS)	BN (PBDS)	BN (SUPP)	BN (PRS)	BN (PRS)	BN (PRS)	BN (PRS)	IND	PBM
Sarawak	Kanowit				IND	SNAP	BN (SNAP)	BN (SNAP)	BN (PBDS)	BN (PBDS)	BN (PBDS)	BN (PRS)	BN (PRS)	BN (PRS)	BN (PRS)	BN (PRS)	GPS (PRS)
Sarawak	Kapit				SNAP	BN (PBB)	BN (PBB)	BN (PBB)	BN (PBB)	BN (PBB)	BN (PBB)	BN (PBB)	BN (PBB)	BN (PBB)	BN (PBB)	BN (PBB)	GPS (PBB)
Sarawak	Kota Samarahan									BN (PBB)	BN (PBB)	BN (PBB)	BN (PBB)	BN (PBB)	BN (PBB)	BN (PBB)	GPS (PBB)
Sarawak	Kuala Rajang									BN (PBB)	BN (PBB)	BN (PBB)	BN (PBB)				
Sarawak	Lambir						SAPO	BN (SUPP)	BN (SUPP)								
Sarawak	Lanang									GR (DAP)	BN (SUPP)	BN (SUPP)	BN (SUPP)	BN (SUPP)	PR (DAP)	PH (DAP)	PH (DAP)
Sarawak	Lawas													BN (PBB)	BN (PBB)	BN (PBB)	GPS (PBB)
Sarawak	Limbang													BN (PBB)	BN (PBB)	BN (PBB)	GPS (PBB)
Sarawak	Limbang-Lawas				SNAP	BN (PBB)											
Sarawak	Lubok Antu				SNAP	SNAP	BN (SNAP)	BN (SNAP)	BN (PBDS)	BN (PBDS)	BN (PBDS)	BN (PRS)	BN (PRS)	BN (PRS)	BN (PRS)	IND	GPS (PRS)
Sarawak	Mambong											BN (PBB)	BN (PBB)	BN (PBB)	BN (PBB)		
Sarawak	Mas Gading						BN (SNAP)	IND	BN (SNAP)	BN (SNAP)	BN (SNAP)	BN (SNAP)	BN (SPDP)	BN (SPDP)	BN (SPDP)	PH (DAP)	PH (DAP)
Sarawak	Miri									BN (SUPP)	BN (SUPP)	BN (SUPP)	BN (SUPP)	BN (SUPP)	PR (PKR)	PH (PKR)	PH (PKR)
Sarawak	Miri-Subis				SNAP	BN (SUPP)											
Sarawak	Mukah				BUMIPUTERA	BN (PBB)	BN (PBB)	BN (PBB)	BN (PBB)	BN (PBB)	BN (PBB)	BN (PBB)	BN (PBB)	BN (PBB)	BN (PBB)	BN (PBB)	GPS (PBB)
Sarawak	Padawan				SUPP	BN (SUPP)	BN (SUPP)	BN (SUPP)	BN (SUPP)	BN (SUPP)	BN (SUPP)						
Sarawak	Paloh						BN (PBB)	BN (PBB)	BN (PBB)								
Sarawak	Payang				BUMIPUTERA	BN (PBB)											
Sarawak	Petra Jaya									BN (PBB)	BN (PBB)	BN (PBB)	BN (PBB)	BN (PBB)	BN (PBB)	BN (PBB)	GPS (PBB)
Sarawak	Puncak Borneo															PH (PKR)	GPS (PBB)
Sarawak	Rajang				SUPP	BN (SUPP)	BN (SUPP)	BN (SUPP)	IND								
Sarawak	Samarahan				BUMIPUTERA	BN (PBB)	BN (PBB)	BN (PBB)	BN (PBB)								
Sarawak	Santubong				BUMIPUTERA	BN (PBB)	BN (PBB)	BN (PBB)	BN (PBB)	BN (PBB)	BN (PBB)	BN (PBB)	BN (PBB)	BN (PBB)	BN (PBB)	BN (PBB)	GPS (PBB)
Sarawak	Saratok				SNAP	SNAP	BN (SNAP)	IND	BN (SNAP)	BN (SNAP)	BN (SNAP)	BN (SNAP)	BN (SPDP)	BN (SPDP)	BN (SPDP)	PH (PKR)	PN (PPBM)
Sarawak	Sarikei				SCA	BN (SUPP)	BN (SUPP)	BN (SUPP)	BN (SUPP)	BN (SUPP)	BN (SUPP)	BN (SUPP)	BN (SUPP)	BN (SUPP)	PR (DAP)	PH (DAP)	GPS (SUPP)
Sarawak	Selangau									IND	BN (PBDS)	BN (PRS)	BN (PRS)	BN (PRS)	BN (PRS)	PH (PKR)	GPS (PRS)
Sarawak	Serian				SNAP	BN (SUPP)	BN (SUPP)	BN (SUPP)	IND	IND	BN (SUPP)	BN (SUPP)	BN (SUPP)	BN (SUPP)	BN (SUPP)	BN (SUPP)	GPS (SUPP)
Sarawak	Sibu						BN (SUPP)	DAP	BN (SUPP)	BN (SUPP)	BN (SUPP)	BN (SUPP)	BN (SUPP)	BN (SUPP)	PR (DAP)	PH (DAP)	PH (DAP)
Sarawak	Sibuti													BN (PBB)	BN (PBB)	BN (PBB)	GPS (PBB)
Sarawak	Simunjan				BUMIPUTERA	BN (PBB)	BN (PBB)	BN (PBB)	BN (PERMAS)								
Sarawak	Sri Aman									BN (PBDS)	BN (PBDS)	BN (PRS)	BN (PRS)	BN (PRS)	BN (PRS)	BN (PRS)	GPS (PRS)
Sarawak	Stampin											BN (SUPP)	BN (SUPP)	BN (SUPP)	PR (DAP)	PH (DAP)	PH (DAP)
Sarawak	Tanjong Manis													BN (PBB)	BN (PBB)	BN (PBB)	GPS (PBB)

== See also ==
- Elections in Malaysia
