= Results of the 1955 Malayan general election by federal constituency =

These are election results of the 1955 Malayan general election by federal constituency. These councillors represented their constituencies from 1955 to 1959 in the Federal Legislative Council.

Voter turnout is calculated using the formula = ((Total Candidate Votes + Rejected Votes)/Electorate)*100

Voter count for Straits Times have significant differences to elector count for Report on the First Election of Members to the Legislative Council of the Federation of Malaya

== Perlis ==
Constituency	Winner	Votes	Opponent(s)	Votes	Rejected Votes	Majority	Electorate	Eligible voters (as per Strait Times)	Malay voters	Chinese voters	Indian voters	Others voters	Voter turnout %
Perlis	Sheikh Ahmad Mohd Hashim (All.)	17,769	Mat Kassim (Ind.)	8,814	590	8,955	30,936	30,936	29,069	923	183	761	87.8%

== Kedah ==
Constituency	Winner	Votes	Opponent(s)	Votes	Rejected Votes	Majority	Electorate	Eligible voters (as per Strait Times)	Malay voters	Chinese voters	Indian voters	Others voters	Voter turnout %
Alor Star	Lee Thean Hin (All.)	27,897	Salim Rejab (Negara)	1,784	481	26,113	35,261	35,264	32,348	2,367	449	100	85.5%
Kedah Selatan	Lim Teng Kwang (All.)	21,050	Mohamed Saleh Shafie (PMIP)	1,563	382	19,487	25,917	25,927	22,265	1,898	1,601	163	88.7%
Kedah Tengah	Khir Johari (All.)	31,077	Puteh Napa (Negara)	1,431	542	29,646	37,176	37,219	34,967	985	329	938	88.9%
Kedah Utara	Syed Ahmad Syed Mahmud Shahabudin (All.)	25,544	Abdullah Abbas (Ind.)	1,578	713	23,966	33,966	33,972	32,091	507	74	1,300	85.8%
Kedah Utara	Syed Ahmad Syed Mahmud Shahabudin (All.)	25,544	Laidin Abdul Manan (Negara)	1,309	713	23,966	33,966	33,972	32,091	507	74	1,300	85.8%
Kota Star	Tunku Kassim Sultan Abdul Hamid (All.)	27,357	Mohamed Rejab Darus (Negara)	2,168	624	25,189	34,043	34,048	32,249	1,113	47	639	88.6%
Sungei Muda	Tunku Abdul Rahman (All.)	22,226	Syed Jan Al-Jeffri (Ind.)	1,239	459	20,987	27,426	27,435	24,725	1,546	601	563	87.2%

== Kelantan ==
Constituency	Winner	Votes	Opponent(s)	Votes	Rejected Votes	Majority	Electorate	Eligible voters (as per Straits Times)	Malay voters	Chinese voters	Indian and others voters	Voter turnout %
Kelantan Selatan	Abdul Khalid Awang Osman (All.)	21,746	Nik Ahmad Kamil Nik Mahmud (Negara)	7,175	1,136	14,571	33,657	39,032	37,436	1,279	317	86.1%
Kelantan Selatan	Abdul Khalid Awang Osman (All.)	21,746	Mohamed Noor Yusoff (PMIP)	3,600	1,136	14,571	33,657	39,032	37,436	1,279	317	86.1%
Kelantan Tengah	Abdul Hamid Mahmud (All.)	28,422	Tengku Annuar Zainal (Negara)	2,970	1,003	25,452	34,270	43,277	41,708	1,362	207	79.4%
Kelantan Tengah	Abdul Hamid Mahmud (All.)	28,422	Nik Mohamed Abdul Rahman (Ind.)	1,154	1,003	25,452	34,270	43,277	41,708	1,362	207	79.4%
Kelantan Tengah	Abdul Hamid Mahmud (All.)	28,422	Idris Mohammed (Ind.)	721	1,003	25,452	34,270	43,277	41,708	1,362	207	79.4%
Kelantan Timor	Nik Hassan Nik Yahya (All.)	30,954	Ahmad Dato' Nara di-Raja (Negara)	4,019	1,011	26,935	39,159	46,235	45,298	481	456	84.7%
Kelantan Timor	Nik Hassan Nik Yahya (All.)	30,954	Asri Muda (PMIP)	2,292	1,011	26,935	39,159	46,235	45,298	481	456	84.7%
Kelantan Timor	Nik Hassan Nik Yahya (All.)	30,954	Mohamed Ibrahim (Ind)	883	1,011	26,935	39,159	46,235	45,298	481	456	84.7%
Kelantan Utara	Tengku Indra Petra Sultan Ibrahim (All.)	28,428	Nik Hussein Zainal (Negara)	6,295	1,337	22,133	36,060	42,554	39,412	1,028	2,114	84.8%
Pasir Mas	Tengku Ahmad Tengku Abdul Ja'afar (All.)	20,963	Mokhtar Ahmad (PMIP)	7,507	979	13,456	29,449	34,803	33,269	946	588	84.7%

== Trengganu ==
Constituency	Winner	Votes	Opponent(s)	Votes	Rejected Votes	Majority	Electorate	Eligible voters (as per Straits Times)	Malay voters	Chinese voters	Indian and others voters	Voter turnout %
Trengganu Selatan	Wan Yahya Wan Mohamed (All.)	16,345	Ibrahim Mat Noh (Negara)	2,628	690	13,717	23,831	23,846	23,534	295	17	82.5%
Trengganu Tengah	Engku Muhsein Abdul Kadir (All.)	19,038	Suleiman Ali (Negara)	4,746	1,067	14,292	33,719	33,747	32,982	735	30	73.7%
Trengganu Utara	Ibrahim Fikri Mohamed (All.)	22,041	Mohamed Salleh Ahmad (Negara)	2,866	1,259	19,175	32,482	35,355	35,066	268	21	80.6%

== Penang-Province Wellesley ==
Constituency	Winner	Votes	Opponent(s)	Votes	Rejected Votes	Majority	Electorate	Eligible voters (as per Straits Times)	Malay voters	Chinese voters	Indian voters	Others voters	Voter turnout %
George Town	Chee Swee Ee (All.)	7,253	Ooi Thiam Siew (Lab.)	2,650	163	4,603	19,935	20,016	3,410	13,912	2,452	242	52.7%
George Town	Chee Swee Ee (All.)	7,253	Cheah Phee Aik (Ind.)	429	163	4,603	19,935	20,016	3,410	13,912	2,452	242	52.7%
Penang Island	S. M. Zainal Abidin (All.)	14,865	Isa Sulaiman (Ind.)	2,925	346	11,940	27,281	27,336	14,663	10,604	1,626	443	66.5%
Wellesley North	Hashim Awang (All.)	0	Returned unopposed	0	0	0	28,190	28,190	20,594	5,534	1,932	141	nil
Wellesley South	Tay Hooi Soo (All.)	15,697	Zabidi Ali (PMIP)	3,523	240	12,174	24,320	23,238	15,576	5,027	2,585	50	80.0%

== Perak ==
Constituency	Winner	Votes	Opponent(s)	Votes	Rejected Votes	Majority	Electorate	Eligible voters (as per Straits Times)	Malay voters	Chinese voters	Indian voters	Others voters	Voter turnout %
Batang Padang	Abdul Hamid Khan Sakhawat Ali Khan (All.)	9,170	Mohamed Shamsuddin Hamzah (NAP)	1,218	212	7,952	13,677	14,355	10,815	1,892	1,644	4	83.1%
Batang Padang	Abdul Hamid Khan Sakhawat Ali Khan (All.)	9,170	Abdul Majid Ariffin (PML)	766	212	7,952	13,677	14,355	10,815	1,892	1,644	4	83.1%
Dindings	Meor Ariff Meor Alwi (All.)	10,511	Mohamed Yunus Mahmood (NAP)	1,629	326	8,882	16,512	16,464	11,903	3,627	932	2	82.8%
Dindings	Meor Ariff Meor Alwi (All.)	10,511	Abdul Wahab Mohamed Noor (PMIP)	1,197	326	8,882	16,512	16,464	11,903	3,627	932	2	82.8%
Ipoh-Menglembu	Leong Yew Koh (All.)	7,421	Loh Ah Kee (NAP)	983	1,069	6,438	12,948	11,610	3,766	6,521	1,261	62	82.8%
Ipoh-Menglembu	Leong Yew Koh (All.)	7,421	D. R. Seenivasagam (PPP)	808	1,069	6,438	12,948	11,610	3,766	6,521	1,261	62	82.8%
Ipoh-Menglembu	Leong Yew Koh (All.)	7,421	W. E. Balasingam (Ind.)	439	1,069	6,438	12,948	11,610	3,766	6,521	1,261	62	82.8%
Kinta Selatan	Too Joon Hing (All.)	11,611	Mohamed Baki Daud (NAP)	1,689	184	9,922	16,216	16,295	10,164	4,578	1,549	4	87.3%
Kinta Selatan	Too Joon Hing (All.)	11,611	Idris Hakim (Ind.)	401	184	9,922	16,216	16,295	10,164	4,578	1,549	4	87.3%
Kinta Selatan	Too Joon Hing (All.)	11,611	Zaharie Hassan (PPP)	273	184	9,922	16,216	16,295	10,164	4,578	1,549	4	87.3%
Kinta Utara	V. T. Sambanthan (All.)	7,900	Chik Mohamad Yusuf Sheikh Abdul Rahman (NAP)	1,832	260	6,068	12,304	12,474	8,052	2,571	1,851	nil	85.6%
Kinta Utara	V. T. Sambanthan (All.)	7,900	K. R. R. Choudhary (Lab.)	357	260	6,068	12,304	12,474	8,052	2,571	1,851	nil	85.6%
Kinta Utara	V. T. Sambanthan (All.)	7,900	Mohamed Ramli Abdullah (PML)	214	260	6,068	12,304	12,474	8,052	2,571	1,851	nil	85.6%
Krian	Ahmad Tuan Hussain (PMIP)	8,685	Sulaiman Ahmad (All.)	8,235	1,071	450	27,239	30,339	28,203	595	1,541	nil	78.2%
Krian	Ahmad Tuan Hussain (PMIP)	8,685	Mohamed Jan Ngah Mohamed (NAP)	3,315	1,071	450	27,239	30,339	28,203	595	1,541	nil	78.2%
Larut-Matang	Cheah Kay Chuan (All.)	15,407	Abu Bakar Said (PML)	4,453	833	10,954	30,454	31,072	23,362	4,199	3,472	39	81.7%
Larut-Matang	Cheah Kay Chuan (All.)	15,407	Wan Zarazillah Wan Ismail (NAP)	3,437	833	10,954	30,454	31,072	23,362	4,199	3,472	39	81.7%
Larut-Matang	Cheah Kay Chuan (All.)	15,407	Puran Singh (Lab)	761	833	10,954	30,454	31,072	23,362	4,199	3,472	39	81.7%
Sungei Perak Hilir	Abdul Aziz Mat Jabar (All.)	17,483	Meor Ahmad Meor Yusof (NAP)	4,794	363	12,689	25,677	26,038	25,716	202	119	1	89.2%
Sungei Perak Hilir	Abdul Aziz Mat Jabar (All.)	17,483	Mohamad Adhan Katib (Ind.)	264	363	12,689	25,677	26,038	25,716	202	119	1	89.2%
Sungei Perak Ulu	Mohamed Ghazali Jawi (All.)	16,781	Mat Judin Ahmad (Ind.)	4,595	449	12,186	28,206	29,665	25,136	3,411	119	1	84.8%
Sungei Perak Ulu	Mohamed Ghazali Jawi (All.)	16,781	Syed Mohamed Noordin Wafa (NAP)	2,099	449	12,186	28,206	29,665	25,136	3,411	119	1	84.8%
Telok Anson	Bahaman Samsudin (All.)	10,514	Hassan Adli Hasan (PMIP)	3,812	555	6,702	18,131	18,154	14,909	1,691	1,546	8	82.1%

== Pahang ==
Constituency	Winner	Votes	Opponent(s)	Votes	Rejected Votes	Majority	Electorate	Eligible voters (as per Strait Times)	Malay voters	Chinese voters	Indian voters	Others voters	Voter turnout %
Pahang Timor	Abdul Rahman Talib (All.)	16,763	Sheikh Kadir Sheikh Omar (Ind.)	1,334	439	15,429	22,291	22,425	21,192	996	227	10	83.2%
Semantan	Abdul Razak Hussein (All.)	14,094	Mohamed Yassin Salleh (PMIP)	1,999	280	12,095	19,849	20,004	17,944	1,938	113	9	82.5%
Ulu Pahang	Mohamed Sulong Mohd Ali (All.)	16,075	Abdul Hamid Ma'ajab (Ind.)	1,910	452	14,165	22,812	22,811	21,088	1,331	385	7	80.8%

== Selangor ==
Constituency	Winner	Votes	Opponent(s)	Votes	Rejected Votes	Majority	Electorate	Eligible voters (as per Straits Times)	Malay voters	Chinese voters	Indian voters	Others voters	Voter turnout %
Kuala Lumpur Barat	Omar Ong Yoke Lin (All.)	4,667	Abdullah Ibrahim (Negara)	1,371	45	3,296	8,862	8,875	4,988	2,485	1,168	234	80.1%
Kuala Lumpur Barat	Omar Ong Yoke Lin (All.)	4,667	Tan Tuan Boon (Lab.)	1,018	45	3,296	8,862	8,875	4,988	2,485	1,168	234	80.1%
Kuala Lumpur Timor	Cheah Ewe Keat (All.)	6,790	Mohamed Salleh Hakim (Negara)	2,431	163	4,359	13,184	13,209	8,697	2,944	1,202	366	78.8%
Kuala Lumpur Timor	Cheah Ewe Keat (All.)	6,790	Abdul Wahab Abdul Majid (Ind.)	1,003	163	4,359	13,184	13,209	8,697	2,944	1,202	366	78.8%
Kuala Selangor	Raja Rastam Shahrome Raja Said Tauphy (All.)	11,857	Othman Abdullah (PMIP)	4,778	425	7,079	21,410	21,506	20,639	645	214	8	83.2%
Kuala Selangor	Raja Rastam Shahrome Raja Said Tauphy (All.)	11,857	Mohamed Ambia Sanusi (Negara)	756	425	7,079	21,410	21,506	20,639	645	214	8	83.2%
Langat	Abu Bakar Baginda (All.)	7,069	Mohamed Nazir Abdul Jalil (Negara)	2,147	255	4,922	10,834	10,840	9,117	598	912	213	87.4%
Selangor Barat	Aziz Ishak (All.)	8,713	Mohamed Rashid Ahmad (Negara)	3,092	238	5,621	13,847	13,844	11,665	1,138	701	340	87.0%
Selangor Tengah	Lee Eng Teh (All.)	5,652	Zulkifli Mohamed (PMIP)	1,711	172	3,941	9,465	9,468	8,311	842	305	10	88.5%
Selangor Tengah	Lee Eng Teh (All.)	5,652	Atan Chik Lengkeng (Negara)	839	172	3,941	9,465	9,468	8,311	842	305	10	88.5%
Ulu Selangor	Halimahton Abdul Majid (All.)	5,430	Abdul Rahman Maulana (Negara)	1,160	131	4,270	7,835	7,837	6,013	905	726	193	85.8%

== Negri Sembilan ==
Constituency	Winner	Votes	Opponent(s)	Votes	Rejected Votes	Majority	Electorate	Eligible voters (as per Straits Times)	Malay voters	Chinese voters	Indian voters	Others voters	Voter turnout %
Negri Sembilan Utara	Abdul Jalil Aminuddin (All.)	12,099	Baba Ludek (Negara)	3,590	435	8,509	26,502	26,664	24,890	1,460	295	19	89.3%
Negri Sembilan Selatan	Mohd Idris Matsil (All.)	21,155	Ujang Menuang (Negara)	1,572	326	19,583	18,651	18,677	16,244	1,331	1,060	42	85.8%
Negri Sembilan Selatan	Mohd Idris Matsil (All.)	21,155	Noordin Abdul Samad (Ind.)	506	326	19,583	18,651	18,677	16,244	1,331	1,060	42	85.8%
Seremban	Lim Kee Siong (All.)	8,402	B. H. Tan (Negara)	2,806	142	6,096	12,979	12,977	8,915	2,509	1,347	206	83.6%

== Malacca ==
Constituency	Winner	Votes	Opponent(s)	Votes	Rejected Votes	Majority	Electorate	Eligible voters (as per Straits Times)	Malay voters	Chinese voters	Indian voters	Others voters	Voter turnout %
Malacca Central	Tan Siew Sin (All.)	17,104	Karim Bakar (Ind.)	3,194	429	13,910	20,727	27,033	17,782	6,752	1,831	669	81.3%
Malacca Luar	Ghafar Baba (All.)	26,790	Ja'afar Tan (Negara)	2,821	547	23,969	34,204	37,675	29,937	3,649	4,040	49	88.2%

== Johore ==
Constituency	Winner	Votes	Opponent(s)	Votes	Rejected Votes	Majority	Electorate	Eligible voters (as per Straits Times)	Malay voters	Chinese voters	Indian voters	Others voters	Voter turnout %
Batu Pahat	S. Chelvasingam MacIntyre (All.)	18,968	Syed Abdul Kadir (Negara)	2,717	293	16,251	27,323	26,921	20,698	5,679	536	8	80.4%
Johore Bahru	Suleiman Abdul Rahman (All.)	8,745	Onn Jaafar (Negara)	2,802	128	5,943	15,042	15,042	12,358	1,889	746	49	77.6%
Johore Selatan	Tan Luang Hong (All.)	21,581	Kassim Awang Chik (Negara)	2,318	473	19,263	29,090	29,090	25,097	3,833	160	nil	83.8%
Johore Tengah	Teoh Chze Chong (All.)	7,100	Annuar Abdul Malek (Negara)	1,068	251	6,032	11,737	11,716	7,054	3,253	1,356	53	71.7%
Johore Timor	Ismail Abdul Rahman (All.)	10,800	Ja'afar Ali (Negara)	350	326	10,450	14,155	14,155	11,896	1,662	591	6	82.9%
Johore Timor	Ismail Abdul Rahman (All.)	10,800	Abdullah Taib (Ind.)	253	326	10,450	14,155	14,155	11,896	1,662	591	6	82.9%
Muar Selatan	Tan Suan Kok (All.)	23,580	Mahmud Mohd Shah (Negara)	4,108	425	19,472	34,321	34,436	27,906	6,344	175	11	81.9%
Muar Utara	Hassan Yunus (All.)	19,802	Mohamed Nor Abdul Hamid (Negara)	3,623	604	16,179	29,272	29,272	21,574	6,335	1,347	16	82.1%
Segamat	Sardon Jubir (All.)	11,072	Razali Abdul Manap (Negara)	2,447	400	8,625	17,482	17,482	10,869	4,323	2,267	23	79.6%
