= Jelebu-Jempol =

Negeri Sembilan constituency

Defunct federal constituency
- Legislature: Dewan Rakyat
- Constituency created: 1958
- Constituency abolished: 1974
- First contested: 1959
- Last contested: 1969

Jelebu-Jempol was a federal constituency in Negeri Sembilan, Malaysia, that was represented in the Dewan Rakyat from 1959 to 1974.

The federal constituency was created in the 1974 redistribution and was mandated to return a single member to the Dewan Rakyat under the first past the post voting system.

== History ==
It was abolished in 1974 when it was redistributed.

=== Representation history ===
Members of Parliament for Jelebu-Jempol
Parliament	No	Years	Member	Party
Constituency created from Negri Sembilan Utara
Parliament of the Federation of Malaya
1st	P083	1959-1963	Mohamed Ujang (محمد اوجڠ)	Alliance (UMNO)
Parliament of Malaysia
1st	P083	1963-1964	Mohamed Ujang (محمد اوجڠ)	Alliance (UMNO)
2nd	P083	1964-1969	Mohamed Idris Matsil (محمد إدريس متسيل)	Alliance (UMNO)
		1969-1971	Parliament was suspended	
3rd	P083	1971-1973	Mohamed Ujang (محمد اوجڠ)	Alliance (UMNO)
3rd	P083	1973-1974	Mohamed Ujang (محمد اوجڠ)	BN (UMNO)
Constituency abolished, split into Jelebu, Tampin and Kuala Pilah

=== State constituency ===
Parliamentary constituency	State constituency						
Parliamentary constituency	1955–59*	1959–1974	1974–1986	1986–1995	1995–2004	2004–2018	2018–present
Jelebu-Jempol		Bahau					
Jelebu-Jempol		Jempol					
Jelebu-Jempol		Kuala Klawang					
Jelebu-Jempol		Pertang					
Jelebu-Jempol		Rompin					

=== Historical boundaries ===
State Constituency	Area
State Constituency	1959–1974
Bahau	Air Hitam; Bahau; Kampung Serting Ulu; Kampung Bayai Baru; Pasoh
Jempol	Batu Kikir; Jambu Lapan; Jempol; Kampung Keru; Kampung Majau
Kuala Klawang	Bukit Payung; Kampung Amar Penghulu; Kuala Klawang; Sungai Muntoh; Titi
Pertang	Kampung Mentaus; Kampung Petaseh Hulu; Pertang; Simpang Durian; Simpang Pertang
Rompin	FELDA Palong; Kampung Taman Jaya; Ladang Geddes; Rompin; Serting Hilir

== Election results ==
Malaysian general election, 1969: Jelebu-Jempol
Party	Candidate	Votes	%	∆%
Alliance	Mohamed Ujang	12,573	66.76	▼1.91
PMIP	Noordin Abdul Samad	6,261	33.24	▲33.24
Total valid votes		18,834	100.00	
Total rejected ballots		3,187		
Unreturned ballots		0		
Turnout		22,021	74.09	▼7.17
Registered electors		29,720		
Majority		6,312	33.52	▼8.62
Alliance hold		Swing		

Malaysian general election, 1964: Jelebu-Jempol
Party	Candidate	Votes	%	∆%
Alliance	Mohamed Idris Matsil	14,498	68.67	▼5.27
Socialist Front	Tan Beng Soo	5,601	26.53	▲26.53
UDP	Abdul Razak Junid	1,015	4.81	▲4.81
Total valid votes		21,114	100.00	
Total rejected ballots		946		
Unreturned ballots		0		
Turnout		22,060	81.26	▲7.63
Registered electors		27,147		
Majority		8,897	42.14	▼5.74
Alliance hold		Swing		

Malayan general election, 1959: Jelebu-Jempol
Party	Candidate	Votes	%
Alliance	Mohamed Ujang	11,265	73.94
PMIP	Ahmad Yaacob	3,970	26.06
Total valid votes		15,235	100.00
Total rejected ballots		183	
Unreturned ballots		0	
Turnout		15,418	73.63
Registered electors		20,940	
Majority		7,295	47.88
This was a new constituency created.
