= Larut Utara =

Perak constituency

Defunct federal constituency
- Legislature: Dewan Rakyat
- Constituency created: 1958
- Constituency abolished: 1974
- First contested: 1959
- Last contested: 1969

Larut Utara was a federal constituency in Perak, Malaysia, that was represented in the Dewan Rakyat from 1959 to 1974.

The federal constituency was created in the 1974 redistribution and was mandated to return a single member to the Dewan Rakyat under the first past the post voting system.

== History ==
It was abolished in 1974 when it was redistributed.

=== Representation history ===
Members of Parliament for Larut Utara
Parliament	No	Years	Member	Party	Vote Share
Constituency created from Larut-Matang
Parliament of the Federation of Malaya
1st	P042	1959-1963	Tajudin Ali (تاجودين علي)	Alliance (UMNO)	16,830; 76.68%
Parliament of Malaysia
1st	P042	1963-1964	Tajudin Ali (تاجودين علي)	Alliance (UMNO)	16,830; 76.68%
2nd	P042	1964-1969	Tajudin Ali (تاجودين علي)	Alliance (UMNO)	14,778; 72.19%
		1969-1971	Parliament was suspended		
3rd	P042	1971-1973	Tajudin Ali (تاجودين علي)	Alliance (UMNO)	15,177; 69.52%
3rd	P042	1973-1974	Tajudin Ali (تاجودين علي)	BN (UMNO)	15,177; 69.52%
Constituency abolished, split into Larut and Taiping

=== State constituency ===
Parliamentary constituency	State constituency						
Parliamentary constituency	1955–59*	1959–1974	1974–1986	1986–1995	1995–2004	2004–2018	2018–present
Larut Utara		Larut					
Larut Utara		Selama					

=== Historical boundaries ===
State Constituency	Area
State Constituency	1959
Larut	Batu Kurau; Kampung Pulau Damar; Kamunting; Kelian Besar; Taman Dato Sri Razak
Selama	Bagan Baharu; Ijok; Kubu Gajah; Larut; Selama

== Election results ==
Malaysian general election, 1969: Larut Utara
Party	Candidate	Votes	%	∆%
Alliance	Tajudin Ali	15,177	69.52	▼2.67
PMIP	Raja Danif Raja Shaharuddin	6,655	30.48	▲9.24
Total valid votes		21,832	100.00	
Total rejected ballots		1,103		
Unreturned ballots		0		
Turnout		22,935	72.43	▲6.36
Registered electors		31,664		
Majority		8,522	39.01	▼11.91
Alliance hold		Swing		

Malaysian general election, 1964: Larut Utara
Party	Candidate	Votes	%	∆%
Alliance	Tajudin Ali	14,778	72.19	▼4.49
PMIP	Abdul Samad Noh	4,348	21.24	▲2.08
UDP	Lim Eng Keat	1,344	6.57	▲6.54
Total valid votes		20,470	100.00	
Total rejected ballots		836		
Unreturned ballots		0		
Turnout		21,306	78.79	▼10.16
Registered electors		27,041		
Majority		10,430	50.95	▼2.41
Alliance hold		Swing		

Malayan general election, 1959: Larut Utara
Party	Candidate	Votes	%
Alliance	Tajudin Ali	16,830	76.68
PMIP	Ibrahim Alla Ditta	5,117	23.32
Total valid votes		21,947	100.00
Total rejected ballots		170	
Unreturned ballots		0	
Turnout		22,117	88.95
Registered electors		24,864	
Majority		11,713	53.36
This was a new constituency created.
