= Semantan (Federal Legislative Council constituency) =

Constituency in Malaysia

Pahang constituency

Defunct federal constituency
- Legislature: Dewan Rakyat
- Constituency created: 1955
- Constituency abolished: 1959
- First contested: 1955
- Last contested: 1955

Semantan was a federal constituency in Pahang, Malaysia, that has been represented in the Federal Legislative Council from 1955 to 1959.

The federal constituency was created in the 1955 redistribution and was mandated to return a single member to the Federal Legislative Council under the first past the post voting system.

== History ==
It was abolished in 1959 when it was redistributed.

=== Representation history ===
Members of Parliament for Semantan
Parliament	Years	Member	Party	Vote Share
Constituency created
1st	1955-1959	Abdul Razak Hussein (عبد الرزاق حسين)	Alliance (UMNO)	14,094; 87.58%
Constituency abolished, split into Bentong and Temerloh

=== State constituency ===
Parliamentary constituency	State constituency						
Parliamentary constituency	1955–59*	1959–1974	1974–1986	1986–1995	1995–2004	2004–2018	2018–present
Semantan	Bentong Barat						
Semantan	Bentong Timor						
Semantan	Temerloh Selatan						
Semantan	Temerloh Tengah						
Semantan	Temerloh Timor						
Semantan	Temerloh Utara						

== Election result ==
Malayan general election, 1955: Semantan
Party	Candidate	Votes	%
Alliance	Abdul Razak Hussein	14,094	87.58
PMIP	Mohd Yassin Mohd Salleh	1,999	12.42
Total valid votes		16,093	100.00
Total rejected ballots			
Unreturned ballots			
Turnout		16,093	82.50
Registered electors		19,507	
Majority		12,095	75.16
This was a new constituency created.
Source(s): The Straits Times.
