= Members of the Federal Legislative Council (1955–1959) =

Members of the Federal Legislative Council (1955–1959)	(1955)
1st Parliament Members of the Dewan Rakyat	(1959)
2nd Parliament Members of the Dewan Rakyat	(1964)

In 1955, a general election was held for the first time. 52 seats were contested, with the majority party earning the right to appoint seven more. In the election, the Alliance Party contested all 52 seats and won 51, while the Pan-Malayan Islamic Party won the remaining seat. Following the elections, Raja Uda Raja Muhammad was elected as the Speaker of the Council, similar to the present Speaker of the Dewan Rakyat.

This is a list of the members of the Federal Legislative Council, elected in 1955.

== Composition ==
State	# of Seats	UMNO Seats	MCA Seats	MIC Seats	PMIP Seats	Lab Seats	Negara Seats	PPP Seats	NAP Seats	PML Seats	IND Seats
Perlis	1	1									
Kedah	6	4	2								
Kelantan	5	5									
Trengganu	3	3									
Penang-Province Wellesley	4	2	2								
Perak	10	5	3	1	1						
Pahang	3	3									
Selangor	7	4	3								
Negri Sembilan	3	2	1								
Malacca	2	1	1								
Johore	8	4	3	1							
Seats won	52	34	15	2	1	0	0	0	0	0	0
Seats contested	129	35	15	2	11	4	30	2	9	3	18

== Elected members by state ==
=== Perlis ===
No.	Federal Constituency	Member	Party
Alliance 1
	Perlis	Sheikh Ahmad Mohd Hashim	Alliance (UMNO)

=== Kedah ===
No.	Federal Constituency	Member	Party
Alliance 6
	Alor Star	Lee Thean Hin	Alliance (MCA)
	Kedah Selatan	Lim Teng Kwang	Alliance (MCA)
	Kedah Tengah	Khir Johari	Alliance (UMNO)
	Kedah Utara	Syed Ahmad Syed Mahmud Shahabudin	Alliance (UMNO)
	Kota Star	Tunku Kassim Sultan Abdul Hamid	Alliance (UMNO)
	Sungei Muda	Tunku Abdul Rahman; Sultan Abdul Hamid Halim Shah	Alliance (UMNO)

=== Kelantan ===
No.	Federal Constituency	Member	Party
Alliance 5
	Kelantan Selatan	Abdul Khalid Awang Osman	Alliance (UMNO)
	Kelantan Tengah	Abdul Hamid Mahmud	Alliance (UMNO)
	Kelantan Timor	Nik Hassan Nik Yahya	Alliance (UMNO)
	Kelantan Utara	Tengku Indra Petra Sultan Ibrahim	Alliance (UMNO)
	Pasir Mas	Tengku Ahmad Tengku Abdul Ja'afar	Alliance (UMNO)

=== Trengganu ===
No.	Federal Constituency	Member	Party
Alliance 3
	Trengganu Selatan	Wan Yahya Wan Mohamed	Alliance (UMNO)
	Trengganu Tengah	Engku Muhsein Abdul Kadir	Alliance (UMNO)
	Trengganu Utara	Ibrahim Fikri Mohamed	Alliance (UMNO)

=== Penang-Province Wellesley ===
No.	Federal Constituency	Member	Party
Alliance 4
	George Town	Chee Swee Ee	Alliance (MCA)
	Penang Island	S. M. Zainal Abidin	Alliance (UMNO)
	Wellesley North	Hashim Awang	Alliance (UMNO)
	Wellesley South	Tay Hooi Soo	Alliance (MCA)

=== Perak ===
No.	Federal Constituency	Member	Party
Alliance 8 | PMIP 1 | PPP 1
	Batang Padang	Abdul Hamid Khan	Alliance (UMNO)
	Dindings	Meor Ariff Meor Alwi	Alliance (UMNO)
	Ipoh-Menglembu	D. R. Seenivasagam from 23 November 1957	PPP
	Ipoh-Menglembu	Leong Yew Koh until 1957	Alliance (MCA)
	Kinta Selatan	Too Joon Hing	Alliance (MCA)
	Kinta Utara	V. T. Sambanthan	Alliance (MIC)
	Krian	Ahmad Tuan Hussain	PMIP
	Larut-Matang	Cheah Kay Chuan	Alliance (MCA)
	Sungei Perak Hilir	Abdul Aziz Mat Jabar	Alliance (UMNO)
	Sungei Perak Ulu	Meor Samsudin Meor Yahya from 26 October 1957	Alliance (UMNO)
	Sungei Perak Ulu	Mohamed Ghazali Jawi until 1957	Alliance (UMNO)
	Telok Anson	Bahaman Samsudin	Alliance (UMNO)

=== Pahang ===
No.	Federal Constituency	Member	Party
Alliance 3
	Pahang Timor	Abdul Rahman Talib	Alliance (UMNO)
	Semantan	Abdul Razak Hussein	Alliance (UMNO)
	Ulu Pahang	Mohamed Sulong Mohd Ali	Alliance (UMNO)

=== Selangor ===
No.	Federal Constituency	Member	Party
Alliance 7
	Kuala Lumpur Barat	Omar Ong Yoke Lin	Alliance (MCA)
	Kuala Lumpur Timor	Cheah Ewe Keat	Alliance (MCA)
	Kuala Selangor	Raja Rastam Shahrome Raja Said Tauphy	Alliance (UMNO)
	Langat	Abu Bakar Baginda	Alliance (UMNO)
	Selangor Barat	Aziz Ishak	Alliance (UMNO)
	Selangor Tengah	Lee Eng Teh	Alliance (MCA)
	Ulu Selangor	Che Halimahton Abdul Majid	Alliance (UMNO)

=== Negri Sembilan ===
No.	Federal Constituency	Member	Party
Alliance 3
	Negri Sembilan Selatan	Abdul Jalil Aminuddin	Alliance (UMNO)
	Negri Sembilan Utara	Mohd Idris Matsil	Alliance (UMNO)
	Seremban	Lim Kee Siong	Alliance (MCA)

=== Malacca ===
No.	Federal Constituency	Member	Party
Alliance 2
	Malacca Central	Tan Siew Sin	Alliance (MCA)
	Malacca Luar	Abdul Ghafar Baba	Alliance (UMNO)

=== Johore ===
No.	Federal Constituency	Member	Party
Alliance 8
	Batu Pahat	Syed Esa Alwee from 14 December 1957	Alliance (UMNO)
	Batu Pahat	S. Chelvasingam MacIntyre until 1957	Alliance (MIC)
	Johore Bahru	Suleiman Abdul Rahman	Alliance (UMNO)
	Johore Selatan	Tan Luang Hong	Alliance (MCA)
	Johore Tengah	Teoh Chze Chong	Alliance (MCA)
	Johore Timor	Ismail Abdul Rahman	Alliance (UMNO)
	Muar Selatan	Tan Suan Kok	Alliance (MCA)
	Muar Utara	Hassan Yunus	Alliance (UMNO)
	Segamat	Sardon Jubir	Alliance (UMNO)

== Appointed and nominated members ==
Member	Party (Coalition)
Quota: 46
Raja Uda Raja Muhammad (Speaker)	
D. C. Watherston (Chief Secretary)	
M. P. Hogan (Attorney-General)	
C. T. Thomas (Financial Secretary)	
O. A. Spencer (Minister for Economic Affairs)	
A. H. P. Humphrey (Secretary for Defence)	
Henry Lee Hau Shik (Kuala Lumpur Nominated)	Alliance (MCA)
Poh Choon Beng (Nominated)	Alliance (MCA)
Leong Hoe Yeng	
Yong Shook Lin	
A. C. G. Pienne	
D. T. Waring	
A. J. Hunter	
H. A. Campbell	
W. G. Scott	
F. G. Pooley	
Raja Ahmad Raja Endut	
Onn Jaafar	
S. E. Chamier (temporary)	
S. B. Palmer	
Chong Khoon Lin (temporary)	
Lee Tiang Keng	
Ong Chong Keng	
Sheikh Ahmad Mohd Hashim (temporary)	
Wan Ahmad Wan Daud	
Mohamad Noah Omar (temporary)	
A. E. W. Godesen (temporary)	
A. Cromarty	
K. Mohd Ariff	
C. M. Hashim	
S. M. Aidid	
Abdul Rahman Talib (temporary)	
Abdul Razak Hussein	
H. H. Facer	
Geoffrey Michael Knocker (temporary)	
A. E. S. McIntosh (temporary)	
D. A. Mackay	
Jules Martin	
Foo See Moi	
Chew Boon Ee	
