= Wellesley North (Federal Legislative Council constituency) =

Constituency in Malaysia

Penang constituency

Defunct federal constituency
- Legislature: Dewan Rakyat
- Constituency created: 1955
- Constituency abolished: 1959
- First contested: 1955
- Last contested: 1955

Wellesley North was a federal constituency in Penang, Malaysia, that has been represented in the Federal Legislative Council from 1955 to 1959.

The federal constituency was created in the 1955 redistribution and is mandated to return a single member to the Federal Legislative Council under the first past the post voting system.

== History ==
It was abolished in 1959 when it was redistributed.

=== Representation history ===
Members of Parliament for Wellesley North
Parliament	Years	Member	Party	Vote Share
Constituency created
1st	1955–1959	Hashim Awang (هشيم اوڠ)	Alliance (UMNO)	Uncontested
Constituency abolished, split into Bagan and Seberang Utara

=== State constituency ===
Parliamentary constituency	State constituency						
Parliamentary constituency	1955–1959*	1959–1974	1974–1986	1986–1995	1995–2004	2004–2018	2018–present
Wellesley North	Butterworth						
Wellesley North	Province Wellesley Central						
Wellesley North	Province Wellesley North						

== Election results ==
Malayan general election, 1955: Wellesley North
Party	Candidate	Votes	%
On the nomination day, Hashim Awang won uncontested.
Alliance	Hashim Awang		
Total valid votes			100.00
Total rejected ballots			
Unreturned ballots			
Turnout			
Registered electors			
Majority			
This was a new constituency created.
Source(s): The Straits Times.
