= Kelantan Utara (Federal Legislative Council constituency) =

Federal constituency in Malaysia

Kelantan constituency

Defunct federal constituency
- Legislature: Dewan Rakyat
- Constituency created: 1955
- Constituency abolished: 1959
- First contested: 1955
- Last contested: 1955

Kelantan Utara was a federal constituency in Kelantan, Malaysia, that has been represented in the Federal Legislative Council from 1955 to 1959.

The federal constituency was created in the 1955 redistribution and is mandated to return a single member to the Federal Legislative Council under the first past the post voting system.

== History ==
It was abolished in 1959 when it was redistributed.

=== Representation history ===
Members of Parliament for Kelantan Utara
Parliament	Years	Member	Party	Vote Share
Constituency created
1st	1955–1959	Tengku Indra Petra Sultan Ibrahim (تڠكو يندرا ڤيترا سلطان إبراهيم)	Alliance (UMNO)	28,428; 81.87%
Constituency abolished, split into Tumpat and Kelantan Hilir

=== State constituency ===
Parliamentary constituency	State constituency						
Parliamentary constituency	1955–1959*	1959–1974	1974–1986	1986–1995	1995–2004	2004–2018	2018–present
Kelantan Utara	Kota Bharu Utara						
Kelantan Utara	Tumpat Selatan						
Kelantan Utara	Tumpat Utara						

== Election results ==
Malayan general election, 1955: Kelantan Utara
Party	Candidate	Votes	%
Alliance	Tengku Indra Petra	28,428	81.87
NEGARA	Nik Hussein Zainal	6,295	18.13
Total valid votes		34,723	100.00
Total rejected ballots			
Unreturned ballots			
Turnout		34,723	
Registered electors		40,947	
Majority		22,133	63.74
This was a new constituency created.
Source(s): The Straits Times.
