= Trengganu Utara (Federal Legislative Council constituency) =

Federal constituency in Malaysia

Terengganu constituency

Defunct federal constituency
- Legislature: Dewan Rakyat
- Constituency created: 1955
- Constituency abolished: 1959
- First contested: 1955
- Last contested: 1955

Trengganu Utara was a federal constituency in Terengganu, Malaysia, that has been represented in the Federal Legislative Council from 1955 to 1959.

The federal constituency was created in the 1955 redistribution and is mandated to return a single member to the Federal Legislative Council under the first past the post voting system.

== History ==
It was abolished in 1959 when it was redistributed.

=== Representation history ===
Members of Parliament for Trengganu Utara
Parliament	Years	Member	Party	Vote Share
Constituency created
1st	1955–1959	Ibrahim Fikri Mohamed (إبراهيم فيكري محمد)	Alliance (UMNO)	22,041; 88.49%
Constituency abolished, split into Besut and Kuala Trengganu Utara

=== State constituency ===
Parliamentary constituency	State constituency						
Parliamentary constituency	1954–1959*	1959–1974	1974–1986	1986–1995	1995–2004	2004–2018	2018–present
Trengganu Utara	Bandar Kuala Trengganu						
Trengganu Utara	Kuala Besut						
Trengganu Utara	Ladang						
Trengganu Utara	Setiu						
Trengganu Utara	Ulu Besut						

== Election results ==
Malayan general election, 1955: Trengganu Utara
Party	Candidate	Votes	%
Alliance	Ibrahim Fikri	22,041	88.49
NEGARA	Mohd Salleh Ahmad	2,866	11.51
Total valid votes		24,907	100.00
Total rejected ballots			
Unreturned ballots			
Turnout		24,907	80.55
Registered electors		30,921	
Majority		19,175	76.98
This was a new constituency created.
Source(s): The Straits Times.
