= Selangor Barat (Federal Legislative Council constituency) =

Former constituency in Malaysia

Selangor constituency

Defunct federal constituency
- Legislature: Dewan Rakyat
- Constituency created: 1955
- Constituency abolished: 1959
- First contested: 1955
- Last contested: 1955

Selangor Barat was a federal constituency in Selangor, Malaysia that was represented in the Federal Legislative Council from 1955 to 1959.

The federal constituency was created in the 1955 redistribution and is mandated to return a single member to the Federal Legislative Council under the first-past-the-post voting system.

== History ==
It was abolished in 1959 when it was redistributed.

=== Representation history ===
Members of Parliament for Selangor Barat
Parliament	Years	Member	Party	Vote Share
Constituency created
1st	1955-1959	Aziz Ishak (عزيز اسحاق)	Alliance (UMNO)	8,173; 73.81%
Constituency abolished, split into Klang and Kuala Langat

=== State constituency ===
Parliamentary constituency	State constituency						
Parliamentary constituency	1955–59*	1959–1974	1974–1986	1986–1995	1995–2004	2004–2018	2018–present
Selangor Barat	Klang						
Selangor Barat	Kuala Langat						

== Election results ==
Malayan general election, 1955: Selangor Barat
Party	Candidate	Votes	%
Alliance	Aziz Ishak	8,713	73.81
NEGARA	Mohd Rashid Ahmad	3,092	26.19
Total valid votes		11,805	100.00
Total rejected ballots			
Unreturned ballots			
Turnout		11,805	86.97
Registered electors		13,574	
Majority		6,438	47.62
This was a new constituency created.
Source(s): The Straits Times.
