= Kuala Lumpur Timor (Federal Legislative Council constituency) =

Former constituency in Malaysia

Selangor constituency

Defunct federal constituency
- Legislature: Dewan Rakyat
- Constituency created: 1955
- Constituency abolished: 1959
- First contested: 1955
- Last contested: 1955

Kuala Lumpur Timor was a federal constituency in Selangor, Malaysia, that was represented in the Federal Legislative Council from 1955 to 1959.

The federal constituency was created in the 1955 redistribution and was mandated to return a single member to the Federal Legislative Council under the first past the post voting system.

== History ==
It was abolished in 1959 when it was redistributed.

=== Representation history ===
Members of Parliament for Kuala Lumpur Timor
Parliament	Years	Member	Party	Vote Share
Constituency created
1st	1955–1959	Cheah Ewe Keat (谢有吉)	Alliance (MCA)	6,790; 66.41%
Constituency abolished, split into Setapak and Bukit Bintang

=== State constituency ===
Parliamentary constituency	State constituency						
Parliamentary constituency	1955–59*	1959–1974	1974–1986	1986–1995	1995–2004	2004–2018	2018–present
Kuala Lumpur Timor	Kuala Lumpur Municipality East						
Kuala Lumpur Timor	Kuala Lumpur East						

== Election result ==
Malayan general election, 1955: Kuala Lumpur Timor
Party	Candidate	Votes	%
Alliance	Cheah Ewe Keat	6,790	66.41
NEGARA	Mohd Salleh Hakim	2,431	23.78
Independent	Abdul Wahab Majid	1,003	9.81
Total valid votes		10,224	100.00
Total rejected ballots			
Unreturned ballots			
Turnout		10,224	78.76
Registered electors		12,981	
Majority		4,359	42.63
This was a new constituency created.
Source(s): The Straits Times.
