= Johore Selatan (Federal Legislative Council constituency) =

Constituency in Malaysia

Johor constituency

Defunct federal constituency
- Legislature: Dewan Rakyat
- Constituency created: 1955
- Constituency abolished: 1959
- First contested: 1955
- Last contested: 1955

Johore Selatan was a federal constituency in Johor, Malaysia, that has been represented in the Federal Legislative Council from 1955 to 1959.

The federal constituency was created in the 1955 redistribution and was mandated to return a single member to the Federal Legislative Council under the first past the post voting system.

== History ==
It was abolished in 1959 when it was redistributed.

=== Representation history ===
Members of Parliament for Johore Selatan
Parliament	Years	Member	Party	Vote Share
Constituency created
1st	1955-1959	Tan Luang Hong (陈銮峰)	Alliance (MCA)	21,581; 90.30%
Constituency abolished, split into Pontian Utara and Pontian Selatan

=== State constituency ===
Parliamentary constituency	State constituency						
Parliamentary constituency	1955–59*	1959–1974	1974–1986	1986–1995	1995–2004	2004–2018	2018–present
Johore Selatan	Johore Bahru Inland						
Johore Selatan	Pontian						

== Election result ==
Malayan general election, 1955: Johore Selatan
Party	Candidate	Votes	%
Alliance	Tan Luang Hong	21,581	90.30
NEGARA	Kassim Awang Chik	2,318	9.70
Total valid votes		23,899	100.00
Total rejected ballots			
Unreturned ballots			
Turnout		23,899	83.80
Registered electors		28,519	
Majority		19,263	80.60
This was a new constituency created.
Source(s): The Straits Times.
