= Selangor Tengah (Federal Legislative Council constituency) =

Former constituency in Malaysia

Selangor constituency

Defunct federal constituency
- Legislature: Dewan Rakyat
- Constituency created: 1955
- Constituency abolished: 1959
- First contested: 1955
- Last contested: 1955

Selangor Tengah was a federal constituency in Selangor, Malaysia, that has been represented in the Federal Legislative Council from 1955 to 1959.

The federal constituency was created in the 1955 redistribution and is mandated to return a single member to the Federal Legislative Council under the first past the post voting system.

== History ==
It was abolished in 1959 when it was redistributed.

=== Representation history ===
Members of Parliament for Selangor Tengah
Parliament	Years	Member	Party	Vote Share
Constituency created
1st	1955-1959	Lee Eng Teh (李荣德)	Alliance (MCA)	5,652; 68.91%
Constituency abolished, split into Damansara and Kapar

=== State constituency ===
Parliamentary constituency	State constituency						
Parliamentary constituency	1955–59*	1959–1974	1974–1986	1986–1995	1995–2004	2004–2018	2018–present
Selangor Tengah	Kuala Lumpur Municipality South						
Selangor Tengah	Kuala Lumpur South						

== Election results ==
Malayan general election, 1955: Selangor Tengah
Party	Candidate	Votes	%
Alliance	Lee Eng Teh	5,652	68.91
PMIP	Zulkifli Mohamed	1,711	20.86
NEGARA	Atan Chik Lengkeng	839	10.23
Total valid votes		8,202	100.00
Total rejected ballots			
Unreturned ballots			
Turnout		8,202	88.50
Registered electors		9,268	
Majority		3,941	48.05
This was a new constituency created.
Source(s): The Straits Times.
