= Kelantan Timor (Federal Legislative Council constituency) =

Defunct federal constituency in Malaysia

Kelantan constituency

Defunct federal constituency
- Legislature: Dewan Rakyat
- Constituency created: 1955
- Constituency abolished: 1959
- First contested: 1955
- Last contested: 1955

Kelantan Timor was a federal constituency in Kelantan, Malaysia, that has been represented in the Federal Legislative Council from 1955 to 1959.

The federal constituency was created in the 1955 redistribution and is mandated to return a single member to the Federal Legislative Council under the first past the post voting system.

== History ==
It was abolished in 1959 when it was redistributed.

=== Representation history ===
Members of Parliament for Kelantan Timor
Parliament	Years	Member	Party	Vote Share
Constituency created
1st	1955–1959	Nik Hassan Nik Yahya (نئ حسن نئ يحي)	Alliance (UMNO)	30,954; 81.14%
Constituency abolished, split into Bachok and Pasir Puteh

=== State constituency ===
Parliamentary constituency	State constituency						
Parliamentary constituency	1955–1959*	1959–1974	1974–1986	1986–1995	1995–2004	2004–2018	2018–present
Kelantan Timor	Bachok Selatan						
Kelantan Timor	Bachok Utara						
Kelantan Timor	Pasir Puteh Selatan						
Kelantan Timor	Pasir Puteh Utara						

== Election results ==
Malayan general election, 1955: Kelantan Timor
Party	Candidate	Votes	%
Alliance	Nik Hasan Nik Yahya	30,954	81.14
NEGARA	Ahmad Dato Nara di-Raja	4,019	10.54
PMIP	Mohamed Asri Muda	2,292	6.01
Independent	Mohamed Ibrahim	883	2.31
Total valid votes		38,148	100.00
Total rejected ballots			
Unreturned ballots			
Turnout		38,148	84.72
Registered electors		45,028	
Majority		6,438	70.60
This was a new constituency created.
Source(s): The Straits Times.
