= Sungei Muda (Federal Legislative Council constituency) =

Kedah constituency

Defunct federal constituency
- Legislature: Dewan Rakyat
- Constituency created: 1955
- Constituency abolished: 1959
- First contested: 1955
- Last contested: 1955

Sungei Muda was a federal constituency in Kedah, Malaysia, that has been represented in the Federal Legislative Council from 1955 to 1959.

The federal constituency was created in the 1955 redistribution and is mandated to return a single member to the Federal Legislative Council under the first past the post voting system.

== History ==
It was abolished in 1959 when it was redistributed.

=== Representation history ===
Members of Parliament for Sungei Muda
| Parliament | Years | Member | Party | Vote Share |
Constituency created
| 1st | 1955–1959 | Tunku Abdul Rahman Putra Al-haj (تونكو عبد الرحمن ڤوترا الحاج ابن سلطان عبد الحميد حليم شاه) | Alliance (UMNO) | 22,226; 94.76% |
Constituency abolished, split into Baling and Sungei Patani

=== State constituency ===
| Parliamentary constituency | State constituency | | | | | | |
| Parliamentary constituency | 1955–1959* | 1959–1974 | 1974–1986 | 1986–1995 | 1995–2004 | 2004–2018 | 2018–present |
|---|---|---|---|---|---|---|---|
| Sungei Muda | Baling | | | | | | |
| Sungei Muda | Sungei Patani | | | | | | |

== Election results ==
Malayan general election, 1955: Sungei Muda
| Party | Candidate | Votes | % |
|---|---|---|---|
| Alliance | Tunku Abdul Rahman | 22,226 | 94.72 |
| Independent | Syed Jan Al Jeffri | 1,239 | 5.28 |
| Total valid votes | | 23,465 | 100.00 |
| Total rejected ballots | | | |
| Unreturned ballots | | | |
| Turnout | | 23,465 | 87.23 |
| Registered electors | | 26,900 | |
| Majority | | 6,438 | 89.44 |
This was a new constituency created.
Source(s): The Straits Times.
