= Sungei Perak Ulu (Federal Legislative Council constituency) =

Perak constituency

Defunct federal constituency
- Legislature: Dewan Rakyat
- Constituency created: 1955
- Constituency abolished: 1959
- First contested: 1957
- Last contested: 1955

Sungei Perak Ulu was a federal constituency in Perak, Malaysia, that has been represented in the Federal Legislative Council from 1955 to 1959.

The federal constituency was created in the 1955 redistribution and is mandated to return a single member to the Federal Legislative Council under the first past the post voting system.

== History ==
It was abolished in 1959 when it was redistributed.

=== Representation history ===
Members of Parliament for Sungei Perak Ulu
Parliament	Years	Member	Party	Vote Share
Constituency created
1st	1955–1957	Mohd Ghazali Jawi (محمد غزالي جاوي)	Alliance (UMNO)	16,781; 71.48%
1st	1957–1959	Meor Samsudin Meor Yahya (ميور شمس الدين ميور يحي)	Alliance (UMNO)	12,795; 68.04%
Constituency abolished, split into Kuala Kangsar and Ulu Perak

=== State constituency ===
Parliamentary constituency	State constituency						
Parliamentary constituency	1955–1959*	1959–1974	1974–1986	1986–1995	1995–2004	2004–2018	2018–present
Sungei Perak Ulu	Kuala Kansgar						
Sungei Perak Ulu	Ulu Perak						

== Election results ==
Malaysian general by-election, 26 October 1957 Upon the resignation of incumbent, Mohamed Ghazali Jawi
Party	Candidate	Votes	%	∆%
Alliance	Meor Samsudin Meor Yahya	12,795	68.04	▼3.44
Rakyat	Mohamed Shariff Babul	5,601	31.96	▲31.96
Total valid votes		18,805		
Total rejected ballots		349		
Unreturned ballots		0		
Turnout		19,154	58.20	▼24.80
Registered electors		32,376		
Majority		7,134	36.08	▼15.83
Alliance hold		Swing		

https://eresources.nlb.gov.sg/newspapers/digitised/article/straitsbudget19571106-1.2.9

Malayan general election, 1955: Sungei Perak Ulu
Party	Candidate	Votes	%
Alliance	Mohd Ghazali Jawi	16,781	71.48
Independent	Mat Judin Ahmad	4,595	19.57
National Association of Perak	Syed Nordin Wafa	2,099	8.94
Total valid votes		23,475	100.00
Total rejected ballots			
Unreturned ballots			
Turnout		23,475	83.00
Registered electors		28,283	
Majority		12,186	51.91
This was a new constituency created.
Source(s): The Straits Times.
