= Negri Sembilan Utara (Federal Legislative Council constituency) =

Former constituency in Malaysia

Negeri Sembilan constituency

Defunct federal constituency
- Legislature: Dewan Rakyat
- Constituency created: 1955
- Constituency abolished: 1959
- First contested: 1955
- Last contested: 1955

Negri Sembilan Selatan was a federal constituency in Negeri Sembilan, Malaysia, that has been represented in the Federal Legislative Council from 1955 to 1959.

The federal constituency was created in the 1955 redistribution and was mandated to return a single member to the Federal Legislative Council under the first past the post voting system.

== History ==
It was abolished in 1959 when it was redistributed.

=== Representation history ===
Members of Parliament for Negri Sembilan Utara
| Parliament | Years | Member | Party | Vote Share |
Constituency created
| 1st | 1955-1959 | Mohd Idris Matsil (محمد إدريس متسيل) | Alliance (UMNO) | 21,155; 91.06% |
Constituency abolished, split into Jelebu-Jempol and Kuala Pilah

=== State constituency ===
| Parliamentary constituency | State constituency | | | | | | |
| Parliamentary constituency | 1955–59* | 1959–1974 | 1974–1986 | 1986–1995 | 1995–2004 | 2004–2018 | 2018–present |
|---|---|---|---|---|---|---|---|
| Negri Sembilan Utara | Jelebu | | | | | | |
| Negri Sembilan Utara | Jempol | | | | | | |
| Negri Sembilan Utara | Johol | | | | | | |
| Negri Sembilan Utara | Pilah | | | | | | |

== Election result ==
Malayan general election, 1955: Negri Sembilan Utara
| Party | Candidate | Votes | % |
|---|---|---|---|
| Alliance | Mohd Idris Mat Sil | 21,155 | 91.06 |
| National Party | Ujang Menuang | 1,572 | 6.77 |
| Independent | Noordin Abd Samad | 506 | 2.18 |
| Total valid votes | | 23,233 | 100.00 |
| Total rejected ballots | | | |
| Unreturned ballots | | | |
| Turnout | | 23,233 | 89.60 |
| Registered electors | | 25,930 | |
| Majority | | 6,438 | 84.29 |
This was a new constituency created.
Source(s): The Straits Times.
