= Dindings (Federal Legislative Council constituency) =

Former constituency in Malaysia

Perak constituency

Defunct federal constituency
- Legislature: Dewan Rakyat
- Constituency created: 1955
- Constituency abolished: 1959
- First contested: 1955
- Last contested: 1955

Dindings was a federal constituency in Perak, Malaysia, that was represented in the Federal Legislative Council from 1955 to 1959.

The federal constituency was created in the 1955 redistribution and is mandated to return a single member to the Federal Legislative Council under the first past the post voting system.

== History ==
It was abolished in 1959 when it was redistributed.

=== Representation history ===
Members of Parliament for Dindings
Parliament	Years	Member	Party	Vote Share
Constituency created
1st	1955–1959	Meor Ariff Alwi (ميور عارف علوي)	Alliance (UMNO)	10,511; 78.81%
Constituency abolished, split into Bruas and Sitiawan

=== State constituency ===
Parliamentary constituency	State constituency						
Parliamentary constituency	1955–1959*	1959–1974	1974–1986	1986–1995	1995–2004	2004–2018	2018–present
Dindings	Dindings						
Dindings	Taiping						

== Election results ==
Malayan general election, 1955: Dindings
Party	Candidate	Votes	%
Alliance	Meor Ariff Alwi	10,511	78.81
National Association of Perak	Mohd Yunus Mahmood	1,629	12.21
PMIP	Abd Wahab Mohd Noor	1,197	8.98
Total valid votes		13,337	100.00
Total rejected ballots			
Unreturned ballots			
Turnout		13,337	82.75
Registered electors		16,117	
Majority		8,882	66.60
This was a new constituency created.
Source(s): The Straits Times.
