= Kelantan Tengah (Federal Legislative Council constituency) =

Federal constituency in Malaysia

Kelantan constituency

Defunct federal constituency
- Legislature: Dewan Rakyat
- Constituency created: 1955
- Constituency abolished: 1959
- First contested: 1955
- Last contested: 1955

Kelantan Tengah was a federal constituency in Kelantan, Malaysia, that has been represented in the Federal Legislative Council from 1955 to 1959.

The federal constituency was created in the 1955 redistribution and is mandated to return a single member to the Federal Legislative Council under the first past the post voting system.

== History ==
It was abolished in 1959 when it was redistributed.

=== Representation history ===
Members of Parliament for Kelantan Tengah
Parliament	Years	Member	Party	Vote Share
Constituency created
1st	1955–1959	Abdul Hamid Mahmud (عبدالحميد مهمود)	Alliance (UMNO)	28,422; 85.44%
Constituency abolished, split into Kota Bharu Hilir and Kota Bharu Hulu

=== State constituency ===
Parliamentary constituency	State constituency						
Parliamentary constituency	1955–1959*	1959–1974	1974–1986	1986–1995	1995–2004	2004–2018	2018–present
Kelantan Tengah	Kota Bharu Bandar						
Kelantan Tengah	Kota Bharu Selatan						
Kelantan Tengah	Kota Bharu Tengah						

== Election results ==
Malayan general election, 1955: Kelantan Tengah
Party	Candidate	Votes	%
Alliance	Abdul Hamid Mahmud	28,422	85.44
NEGARA	Tengku Annuar Zainal	2,970	8.93
Independent	Nik Mohamed Dato Amar	1,154	3.47
Independent	Idris Mohamed	721	2.17
Total valid votes		33,267	100.00
Total rejected ballots			
Unreturned ballots			
Turnout		33,267	79.30
Registered electors		41,951	
Majority		25,452	76.51
This was a new constituency created.
Source(s): The Straits Times.
