= Sungei Perak Hilir (Federal Legislative Council constituency) =

Perak constituency

Defunct federal constituency
- Legislature: Dewan Rakyat
- Constituency created: 1955
- Constituency abolished: 1959
- First contested: 1955
- Last contested: 1955

Sungei Perak Hilir was a federal constituency in Penang, Malaysia, that has been represented in the Federal Legislative Council from 1955 to 1959.

The federal constituency was created in the 1955 redistribution and is mandated to return a single member to the Federal Legislative Council under the first past the post voting system.

== History ==
It was abolished in 1959 when it was redistributed.

=== Representation history ===
Members of Parliament for Sungei Perak Hilir
| Parliament | Years | Member | Party | Vote Share |
Constituency created
| 1st | 1955–1959 | Abdul Aziz Mat Jabar (عبدالعزيز مت جبار) | Alliance (UMNO) | 17,483; 77.56% |
Constituency abolished, split into Parit and Hilir Perak

=== State constituency ===
| Parliamentary constituency | State constituency | | | | | | |
| Parliamentary constituency | 1955–1959* | 1959–1974 | 1974–1986 | 1986–1995 | 1995–2004 | 2004–2018 | 2018–present |
|---|---|---|---|---|---|---|---|
| Sungei Perak Hilir | Lower Perak North | | | | | | |
| Sungei Perak Hilir | Parit | | | | | | |

== Election results ==
Malayan general election, 1955: Sungei Perak Hilir
| Party | Candidate | Votes | % |
|---|---|---|---|
| Alliance | Abdul Aziz Mat Jabar | 17,483 | 77.56 |
| National Association of Perak | Meor Ahmad Yusoff | 4,794 | 21.27 |
| Independent | Mohd Dahan Katib | 264 | 1.17 |
| Total valid votes | | 22,541 | 100.00 |
| Total rejected ballots | | | |
| Unreturned ballots | | | |
| Turnout | | 22,541 | 89.20 |
| Registered electors | | 25,270 | |
| Majority | | 12,689 | 56.29 |
This was a new constituency created.
Source(s): The Straits Times.
