= Kinta Utara (Federal Legislative Council constituency) =

Former constituency in Malaysia

Perak constituency

Defunct federal constituency
- Legislature: Dewan Rakyat
- Constituency created: 1955
- Constituency abolished: 1959
- First contested: 1955
- Last contested: 1955

Kinta Utara was a federal constituency in Perak, Malaysia, that has been represented in the Federal Legislative Council from 1955 to 1959.

The federal constituency was created in the 1955 redistribution and is mandated to return a single member to the Federal Legislative Council under the first past the post voting system.

== History ==
It was abolished in 1959 when it was redistributed.

=== Representation history ===
Members of Parliament for Kinta Utara
Parliament	Years	Member	Party	Vote Share
Constituency created
1st	1955-1959	V. T. Sambanthan (திருஞானசம்பந்தன்)	Alliance (MIC)	7,900; 76.68%
Constituency abolished, split into Sungai Siput and Ulu Kinta

=== State constituency ===
Parliamentary constituency	State constituency						
Parliamentary constituency	1955–59*	1959–1974	1974–1986	1986–1995	1995–2004	2004–2018	2018–present
Kinta Utara	Kinta North						
Kinta Utara	Sungei Siput						

== Election results ==
Malayan general election, 1955: Kinta Utara
Party	Candidate	Votes	%
Alliance	V. T. Sambanthan	7,900	76.68
National Association of Perak	Chik Mohamed Yusuf	1,832	17.78
Labour	Choudhary K. R. R.	357	3.47
Perak Malay League	Mohd Ramly Abdullah	214	2.08
Total valid votes		10,303	100.00
Total rejected ballots			
Unreturned ballots			
Turnout		10,303	85.85
Registered electors		12,001	
Majority		6,068	58.90
This was a new constituency created.
Source(s): The Straits Times.
