= Kinta Selatan (Federal Legislative Council constituency) =

Former constituency in Malaysia

Perak constituency

Defunct federal constituency
- Legislature: Dewan Rakyat
- Constituency created: 1955
- Constituency abolished: 1959
- First contested: 1955
- Last contested: 1955

Kinta Selatan was a federal constituency in Perak, Malaysia, that has been represented in the Federal Legislative Council from 1955 to 1959.

The federal constituency was created in the 1955 redistribution and is mandated to return a single member to the Federal Legislative Council under the first past the post voting system.

== History ==
It was abolished in 1959 when it was redistributed.

=== Representation history ===
Members of Parliament for Kinta Selatan
Parliament	Years	Member	Party	Vote Share
Constituency created
1st	1955-1959	Too Joon Hing (朱运兴)	Alliance (MCA)	11,611; 83.09%
Constituency abolished, split into Batu Gajah and Kampar

=== State constituency ===
Parliamentary constituency	State constituency						
Parliamentary constituency	1955–59*	1959–1974	1974–1986	1986–1995	1995–2004	2004–2018	2018–present
Kinta Selatan	Kinta South						
Kinta Selatan	Ipoh East						

== Election results ==
Malayan general election, 1955: Kinta Selatan
Party	Candidate	Votes	%
Alliance	Too Joon Hing	11,611	83.09
National Association of Perak	Mohd Baki Daud	1,629	11.66
Independent	Idris Hakim	401	2.87
PPP	Zaharie Hassan	273	1.95
Total valid votes		13,974	100.00
Total rejected ballots			
Unreturned ballots			
Turnout		13,974	86.90
Registered electors		16,081	
Majority		9,922	71.43
This was a new constituency created.
Source(s): The Straits Times.
