= Kedah Utara (Federal Legislative Council constituency) =

Abolished federal constituency in Malaysia

Kedah constituency

Defunct federal constituency
- Legislature: Dewan Rakyat
- Constituency created: 1955
- Constituency abolished: 1959
- First contested: 1955
- Last contested: 1955

Kedah Utara was a federal constituency in Kedah, Malaysia, that has been represented in the Federal Legislative Council from 1955 to 1959.

The federal constituency was created in the 1955 redistribution and is mandated to return a single member to the Federal Legislative Council under the first past the post voting system.

== History ==
It was abolished in 1959 when it was redistributed.

=== Representation history ===
Members of Parliament for Kedah Utara
Parliament	Years	Member	Party	Vote Share
Constituency created
1st	1955–1959	Syed Ahmad Syed Mahmud Shahabudin (سيد احمد سيد مهمود شاهبودين)	Alliance (UMNO)	25,544; 89.85%
Constituency abolished, split into Jitra-Padang Terap and Kubang Pasu Barat

=== State constituency ===
Parliamentary constituency	State constituency						
Parliamentary constituency	1955–1959*	1959–1974	1974–1986	1986–1995	1995–2004	2004–2018	2018–present
Kedah Utara	Jitra-Padang Terap						
Kedah Utara	Kubang Pasu Barat						

== Election results ==
Malayan general election, 1955: Kedah Utara
Party	Candidate	Votes	%
Alliance	Syed Ahmad Shahbuddin	25,544	89.85
Independent	Abdullah Abbas	1,578	5.55
National Party	Laidin Abdul Manan	1,309	4.60
Total valid votes		28,431	100.00
Total rejected ballots			
Unreturned ballots			
Turnout		28,431	86.00
Registered electors		33,059	
Majority		23,966	84.30
This was a new constituency created.
Source(s): The Straits Times.
