= Kedah Selatan (Federal Legislative Council constituency) =

Kedah constituency

Defunct federal constituency
- Legislature: Dewan Rakyat
- Constituency created: 1955
- Constituency abolished: 1959
- First contested: 1955
- Last contested: 1955

Kedah Selatan was a federal constituency in Kedah, Malaysia, that has been represented in the Federal Legislative Council from 1955 to 1959.

The federal constituency was created in the 1955 redistribution and is mandated to return a single member to the Federal Legislative Council under the first past the post voting system.

== History ==
It was abolished in 1959 when it was redistributed.

=== Representation history ===
Members of Parliament for Kedah Selatan
Parliament	Years	Member	Party	Vote Share
Constituency created
1st	1955–1959	Lim Teng Kwang (林廷光)	Alliance (MCA)	21,050; 93.09%
Constituency abolished, split into Kulim Utara and Kulim-Bandar Bahru

=== State constituency ===
Parliamentary constituency	State constituency						
Parliamentary constituency	1955–1959*	1959–1974	1974–1986	1986–1995	1995–2004	2004–2018	2018–present
Kedah Selatan	Kulim Utara						
Kedah Selatan	Kulim-Bandar Bahru						

== Election results ==
Malayan general election, 1955: Kedah Selatan
Party	Candidate	Votes	%
Alliance	Lim Teng Kwang	21,050	93.09
PMIP	M. Saleh Shafie	1,563	6.91
Total valid votes		22,613	100.00
Total rejected ballots			
Unreturned ballots			
Turnout		22,613	88.40
Registered electors		25,580	
Majority		19,487	86.18
This was a new constituency created.
Source(s): The Straits Times.
