= Trengganu Selatan (Federal Legislative Council constituency) =

Federal constituency in Malaysia

Terengganu constituency

Defunct federal constituency
- Legislature: Dewan Rakyat
- Constituency created: 1955
- Constituency abolished: 1959
- First contested: 1955
- Last contested: 1955

Trengganu Selatan was a federal constituency in Terengganu, Malaysia, that has been represented in the Federal Legislative Council from 1955 to 1959.

The federal constituency was created in the 1955 redistribution and is mandated to return a single member to the Federal Legislative Council under the first past the post voting system.

== History ==
It was abolished in 1959 when it was redistributed.

=== Representation history ===
Members of Parliament for Trengganu Selatan
Parliament	Years	Member	Party	Vote Share
Constituency created
1st	1955–1959	Wan Yahya Wan Mohamed (وان يحي وان محمد)	Alliance (UMNO)	16,345; 86.15%
Constituency abolished, split into Dungun and Kemaman

=== State constituency ===
Parliamentary constituency	State constituency						
Parliamentary constituency	1954–1959*	1959–1974	1974–1986	1986–1995	1995–2004	2004–2018	2018–present
Trengganu Selatan	Dungun						
Trengganu Selatan	Kemaman Selatan						
Trengganu Selatan	Marang						
Trengganu Selatan	Paka-Kemaman Utara						
Trengganu Selatan	Ulu Trengganu						

== Election results ==
Malayan general election, 1955: Trengganu Selatan
Party	Candidate	Votes	%
Alliance	Wan Yahya Wan Mohamed	16,345	86.15
NEGARA	Ibrahim Mat Noh	2,628	13.85
Total valid votes		18,973	100.00
Total rejected ballots			
Unreturned ballots			
Turnout		18,973	82.51
Registered electors		22,995	
Majority		13,717	72.30
This was a new constituency created.
Source(s): The Straits Times.
