= George Town (Federal Legislative Council constituency) =

Penang constituency

Defunct federal constituency
- Legislature: Dewan Rakyat
- Constituency created: 1955
- Constituency abolished: 1959
- First contested: 1955
- Last contested: 1955

George Town was a federal constituency in Penang, Malaysia, that has been represented in the Federal Legislative Council from 1955 to 1959.

The federal constituency was created in the 1955 redistribution and is mandated to return a single member to the Federal Legislative Council under the first past the post voting system.

== History ==
It was abolished in 1959 when it was redistributed.

=== Representation history ===
Members of Parliament for George Town
Parliament	Years	Member	Party	Vote Share
Constituency created
1st	1955–1959	Chee Swee Ee (徐瑞意)	Alliance (MCA)	7,253; 70.20%
Constituency abolished, split into Tanjong and Dato' Kramat

=== State constituency ===
Parliamentary constituency	State constituency						
Parliamentary constituency	1955–1959*	1959–1974	1974–1986	1986–1995	1995–2004	2004–2018	2018–present
George Town	Kelawei						
George Town	North Coast						
George Town	Tanjong East						
George Town	Tanjong West						

== Election results ==
Malayan general election, 1955: George Town
Party	Candidate	Votes	%
Alliance	Chee Swee Ee	7,253	70.20
Labour	Ooi Thiam Siew	2,650	25.69
Independent	Cheah Phee Aik	429	4.15
Total valid votes		10,332	100.00
Total rejected ballots			
Unreturned ballots			
Turnout		10,332	52.60
Registered electors		19,643	
Majority		4,603	44.51
This was a new constituency created.
Source(s): The Straits Times.
