= Johore Tengah (Federal Legislative Council constituency) =

Constituency in Malaysia

Johor constituency

Defunct federal constituency
- Legislature: Dewan Rakyat
- Constituency created: 1955
- Constituency abolished: 1959
- First contested: 1955
- Last contested: 1955

Johore Tengah was a federal constituency in Johor, Malaysia, that has been represented in the Federal Legislative Council from 1955 to 1959.

The federal constituency was created in the 1955 redistribution and was mandated to return a single member to the Federal Legislative Council under the first past the post voting system.

== History ==
It was abolished in 1959 when it was redistributed.

=== Representation history ===
Members of Parliament for Johore Timor
Parliament	Years	Member	Party	Vote Share
Constituency created
1st	1955-1959	Teoh Chze Chong (张纸宗)	Alliance (MCA)	7,100; 86.92%
Constituency abolished, split into Kluang Utara and Kluang Selatan

=== State constituency ===
Parliamentary constituency	State constituency						
Parliamentary constituency	1955–59*	1959–1974	1974–1986	1986–1995	1995–2004	2004–2018	2018–present
Johore Tengah	Kluang						
Johore Tengah	Muar Inland						

== Election result ==
Malayan general election, 1955: Johore Tengah
Party	Candidate	Votes	%
Alliance	Teoh Chze Chong	7,100	86.92
NEGARA	Anwar Abd Malik	1,068	13.08
Total valid votes		8,168	100.00
Total rejected ballots			
Unreturned ballots			
Turnout		8,168	71.72
Registered electors		11,389	
Majority		6,032	73.84
This was a new constituency created.
Source(s): The Straits Times.
