= Kelantan Selatan (Federal Legislative Council constituency) =

Federal constituency in Malaysia

Kelantan constituency

Defunct federal constituency
- Legislature: Dewan Rakyat
- Constituency created: 1955
- Constituency abolished: 1959
- First contested: 1955
- Last contested: 1955

Kelantan Selatan was a federal constituency in Kelantan, Malaysia, that has been represented in the Federal Legislative Council from 1955 to 1959.

The federal constituency was created in the 1955 redistribution and is mandated to return a single member to the Federal Legislative Council under the first past the post voting system.

== History ==
It was abolished in 1959 when it was redistributed.

=== Representation history ===
Members of Parliament for Kelantan Selatan
Parliament	Years	Member	Party	Vote Share
Constituency created
1st	1955–1959	Abdul Khalid Awang Osman (عبدالخالد اوڠ عثمان)	Alliance (UMNO)	21,746; 66.87%
Constituency abolished, split into Ulu Kelantan and Tanah Merah

=== State constituency ===
Parliamentary constituency	State constituency						
Parliamentary constituency	1955–1959*	1959–1974	1974–1986	1986–1995	1995–2004	2004–2018	2018–present
Kelantan Selatan	Machang						
Kelantan Selatan	Tanah Merah						
Kelantan Selatan	Ulu Kelantan						

== Election results ==
Malayan general election, 1955: Kelantan Selantan
Party	Candidate	Votes	%
Alliance	Abdul Khalid Awang Osman	21,746	66.87
NEGARA	Nik Ahmed Kamil	7,175	22.06
PMIP	Mohamed Noor	3,600	11.07
Total valid votes		32,521	100.00
Total rejected ballots			
Unreturned ballots			
Turnout		32,521	86.10
Registered electors		37,771	
Majority		14,571	44.81
This was a new constituency created.
Source(s): The Straits Times.
