= Penang Island (Federal Legislative Council constituency) =

Penang constituency

Defunct federal constituency
- Legislature: Dewan Rakyat
- Constituency created: 1955
- Constituency abolished: 1959
- First contested: 1955
- Last contested: 1955

Penang Island was a federal constituency in Penang, Malaysia, that has been represented in the Federal Legislative Council from 1955 to 1959.

The federal constituency was created in the 1955 redistribution and is mandated to return a single member to the Federal Legislative Council under the first past the post voting system.

== History ==
It was abolished in 1959 when it was redistributed.

=== Representation history ===
Members of Parliament for Penang Island
Parliament	Years	Member	Party	Vote Share
Constituency created
1st	1955–1959	S. M. Zainal Abidin (س. م. زاينل عابدين)	Alliance (UMNO)	14,865; 83.56%
Constituency abolished, split into Penang Selatan and Penang Utara

=== State constituency ===
Parliamentary constituency	State constituency						
Parliamentary constituency	1955–1959*	1959–1974	1974–1986	1986–1995	1995–2004	2004–2018	2018–present
Penang Island	East Coast						
Penang Island	Jelutong						
Penang Island	South Coast						
Penang Island	West Coast						

== Election results ==
Malayan general election, 1955: Penang Island
Party	Candidate	Votes	%
Alliance	S. M. Zainul Abidin	14,865	83.56
Independent	Isa Sulaiman	2,925	16.44
Total valid votes		17,790	100.00
Total rejected ballots			
Unreturned ballots			
Turnout		17,790	66.48
Registered electors		26,759	
Majority		11,940	67.12
This was a new constituency created.
Source(s): The Straits Times.
