= Ulu Pahang (Federal Legislative Council constituency) =

Constituency in Malaysia

Pahang constituency

Defunct federal constituency
- Legislature: Dewan Rakyat
- Constituency created: 1955
- Constituency abolished: 1959
- First contested: 1955
- Last contested: 1955

Ulu Pahang was a federal constituency in Pahang, Malaysia, that has been represented in the Federal Legislative Council from 1955 to 1959.

The federal constituency was created in the 1955 redistribution and was mandated to return a single member to the Federal Legislative Council under the first past the post voting system.

== History ==
It was abolished in 1959 when it was redistributed.

=== Representation history ===
Members of Parliament for Ulu Pahang
Parliament	Years	Member	Party	Vote Share
Constituency created
1st	1955-1959	Mohamed Sulong Mohd Ali (محمد سولوڠ محمد علي)	Alliance (UMNO)	16,075; 89.38%
Constituency abolished, split into Raub and Lipis

=== State constituency ===
Parliamentary constituency	State constituency						
Parliamentary constituency	1955–59*	1959–1974	1974–1986	1986–1995	1995–2004	2004–2018	2018–present
Ulu Pahang	Cameron Highlands						
Ulu Pahang	Lipis Selatan						
Ulu Pahang	Lipis Timor						
Ulu Pahang	Lipis Utara						
Ulu Pahang	Raub Selatan						
Ulu Pahang	Raub Utara						

== Election results ==
Malayan general election, 1955: Ulu Pahang
Party	Candidate	Votes	%
Alliance	Mohamed Sulong Mohamed Ali	16,075	89.38
Independent	Abdul Hamid Ma'ajab	1,910	10.62
Total valid votes		17,985	100.00
Total rejected ballots			
Unreturned ballots			
Turnout		17,985	78.84
Registered electors		22,811	
Majority		14,165	78.76
This was a new constituency created.
Source(s): The Straits Times.
