= Negri Sembilan Selatan (Federal Legislative Council constituency) =

Former constituency in Malaysia

Negeri Sembilan constituency

Defunct federal constituency
- Legislature: Dewan Rakyat
- Constituency created: 1955
- Constituency abolished: 1959
- First contested: 1955
- Last contested: 1955

Negri Sembilan Selatan was a federal constituency in Negeri Sembilan, Malaysia, that has been represented in the Federal Legislative Council from 1955 to 1959.

The federal constituency was created in the 1955 redistribution and was mandated to return a single member to the Federal Legislative Council under the first past the post voting system.

== History ==
It was abolished in 1959 when it was redistributed.

=== Representation history ===
Members of Parliament for Negri Sembilan Selatan
Parliament	Years	Member	Party	Vote Share
Constituency created
1st	1955-1959	Abdul Jalil Aminuddin (عبدالجليل أمين الدين)	Alliance (UMNO)	12,099; 77.12%
Constituency abolished, split into Port Dickson and Rembau-Tampin

=== State constituency ===
Parliamentary constituency	State constituency						
Parliamentary constituency	1955–59*	1959–1974	1974–1986	1986–1995	1995–2004	2004–2018	2018–present
Negri Sembilan Selatan	Linggi						
Negri Sembilan Selatan	Port Dickson						
Negri Sembilan Selatan	Rembau						
Negri Sembilan Selatan	Tampin						

== Election result ==
Malayan general election, 1955: Negri Sembilan Selatan
Party	Candidate	Votes	%
Alliance	Abdul Jalil Aminuddin	12,099	77.12
NEGARA	Baba Ludek	3,590	22.88
Total valid votes		15,689	100.00
Total rejected ballots			
Unreturned ballots			
Turnout		15,689	85.80
Registered electors		18,286	
Majority		8,509	54.24
This was a new constituency created.
Source(s): The Straits Times.
