= Wellesley South (Federal Legislative Council constituency) =

Federal constituency in Malaysia

Penang constituency

Defunct federal constituency
- Legislature: Dewan Rakyat
- Constituency created: 1955
- Constituency abolished: 1959
- First contested: 1955
- Last contested: 1955

Wellesley South was a federal constituency in Penang, Malaysia, that has been represented in the Federal Legislative Council from 1955 to 1959.

The federal constituency was created in the 1955 redistribution and is mandated to return a single member to the Federal Legislative Council under the first past the post voting system.

== History ==
It was abolished in 1959 when it was redistributed.

=== Representation history ===
Members of Parliament for Wellesley South
Parliament	Years	Member	Party	Vote Share
Constituency created
1st	1955–1959	Tay Hooi Soo (戴惠思)	Alliance (MCA)	15,697; 81.67%
Constituency abolished, split into Seberang Selatan and Seberang Tengah

=== State constituency ===
Parliamentary constituency	State constituency						
Parliamentary constituency	1955–1959*	1959–1974	1974–1986	1986–1995	1995–2004	2004–2018	2018–present
Wellesley South	Batu Kawan						
Wellesley South	Bukit Mertajam						
Wellesley South	Province Wellesley South						

== Election results ==
Malayan general election, 1955: Wellesley South
Party	Candidate	Votes	%
Alliance	Tay Hooi Soo	15,697	81.67
PMIP	Tuan Zabidi	3,523	18.33
Total valid votes		19,220	100.00
Total rejected ballots			
Unreturned ballots			
Turnout		19,220	79.90
Registered electors		24,055	
Majority		12,174	63.34
This was a new constituency created.
Source(s): The Straits Times.
