= Larut-Matang (Federal Legislative Council constituency) =

Constituency in Malaysia

Perak constituency

Defunct federal constituency
- Legislature: Dewan Rakyat
- Constituency created: 1955
- Constituency abolished: 1959
- First contested: 1955
- Last contested: 1955

Larut-Matang was a federal constituency in Perak, Malaysia, that has been represented in the Federal Legislative Council from 1955 to 1959.

The federal constituency was created in the 1955 redistribution and is mandated to return a single member to the Federal Legislative Council under the first past the post voting system.

== History ==
It was abolished in 1959 when it was redistributed.

=== Representation history ===
Members of Parliament for Larut-Matang
Parliament	Years	Member	Party	Vote Share
Constituency created
1st	1955-1959	Cheah Kay Chuan (谢啟皋)	Alliance (MCA)	15,407; 64.04%
Constituency abolished, split into Larut Selatan and Larut Utara

=== State constituency ===
Parliamentary constituency	State constituency						
Parliamentary constituency	1955–59*	1959–1974	1974–1986	1986–1995	1995–2004	2004–2018	2018–present
Larut-Matang	Larut South-Matang						
Larut-Matang	Selama-Larut North						

== Election results ==
Malayan general election, 1955: Larut-Matang
Party	Candidate	Votes	%
Alliance	Cheah Khay Chuan	15,407	64.04
Perak Malay League	Abu Bakar Said	4,453	18.51
National Association of Perak	Wan Zarazillah	3,437	14.29
Labour	Puran Singh	761	3.16
Total valid votes		24,058	100.00
Total rejected ballots			
Unreturned ballots			
Turnout		24,508	81.70
Registered electors		29,447	
Majority		10,954	45.53
This was a new constituency created.
Source(s): The Straits Times.
