= Pahang Timor (Federal Legislative Council constituency) =

Former Malaysian federal constituency

Pahang constituency

Defunct federal constituency
- Legislature: Dewan Rakyat
- Constituency created: 1955
- Constituency abolished: 1959
- First contested: 1955
- Last contested: 1955

Pahang Timor was a federal constituency in Pahang, Malaysia, that has been represented in the Federal Legislative Council from 1955 to 1959.

The federal constituency was created in the 1955 redistribution and was mandated to return a single member to the Federal Legislative Council under the first past the post voting system.

== History ==
It was abolished in 1959 when it was redistributed.

=== Representation history ===
Members of Parliament for Pahang Timor
Parliament	Years	Member	Party	Vote Share
Constituency created
1st	1955-1959	Abdul Rahman Talib (عبدالرحمن طالب)	Alliance (UMNO)	16,763; 92.62%
Constituency abolished, split into Kuantan and Pekan

=== State constituency ===
Parliamentary constituency	State constituency						
Parliamentary constituency	1955–59*	1959–1974	1974–1986	1986–1995	1995–2004	2004–2018	2018–present
Pahang Timor	Kuantan Barat						
Pahang Timor	Kuantan Timor						
Pahang Timor	Pekan Selatan						
Pahang Timor	Pekan Utara						

== Election result ==
Malayan general election, 1955: Pahang Timor
Party	Candidate	Votes	%
Alliance	Abdul Rahman Talib	16,763	92.62
Independent	Sheikh Kadir Sheikh Omar	1,334	73.71
Total valid votes		18,097	100.00
Total rejected ballots			
Unreturned ballots			
Turnout		18,097	80.70
Registered electors		22,425	
Majority		15,429	18.91
This was a new constituency created.
Source(s): The Straits Times.
