= Malacca Central (Federal Legislative Council constituency) =

Former constituency in Malaysia

Malacca constituency

Defunct federal constituency
- Legislature: Dewan Rakyat
- Constituency created: 1955
- Constituency abolished: 1959
- First contested: 1955
- Last contested: 1955

Malacca Central was a federal constituency in Malacca, Malaysia, that has been represented in the Federal Legislative Council from 1955 to 1959.

The federal constituency was created in the 1955 redistribution and is mandated to return a single member to the Federal Legislative Council under the first past the post voting system.

== History ==
It was abolished in 1959 when it was redistributed.

=== Representation history ===
Members of Parliament for Malacca Central
Parliament	Years	Member	Party	Vote Share
Constituency created
1st	1955-1959	Tan Siew Sin (陈修信)	Alliance (MCA)	17,104; 84.26%
Constituency abolished, split into Malacca Tengah and Bandar Malacca

=== State constituency ===
Parliamentary constituency	State constituency						
Parliamentary constituency	1955–59*	1959–1974	1974–1986	1986–1995	1995–2004	2004–2018	2018–present
Malacca Central	East Central						
Malacca Central	East Fort						
Malacca Central	West Central						
Malacca Central	West Fort						

== Election results ==
Malayan general election, 1955: Malacca Central
Party	Candidate	Votes	%
Alliance	Tan Siew Sin	17,104	84.26
Independent	Karim Bakar	3,194	15.74
Total valid votes		20,298	100.00
Total rejected ballots			
Unreturned ballots			
Turnout		20,298	82.09
Registered electors		24,273	
Majority		13,910	68.52
This was a new constituency created.
Source(s): The Straits Times.
