= Elections in Johor =

Elections in Johor (formerly Johore) have been held in the Malaysian state of Johor since 1954 and have chosen Johor's elected representatives in the Dewan Rakyat and Dewan Undangan Negeri (the Malaysian federal and state assemblies).

== Federal level ==
=== Federal constituencies ===
- List of Malayan federal electoral districts (1955–1959)#Johore
- List of former Malaysian federal electoral districts#Johor
- List of Malaysian electoral districts#Johor

== State level ==
=== State constituencies ===
- List of Malayan state and settlement electoral districts (1954–1959)#Johore
- List of former Malaysian state electoral districts#Johor

== By-Elections ==
=== State Assembly ===
- 2024
1. Mahkota
- 2023
1. Simpang Jeram
- 2011
1. Tenang
- 1989
1. Tambatan
- 1988
1. Tanjong Puteri
2. Parit Raja
- 1977
1. Bandar Penggaram
2. Parit Jawa
- 1974
1. Parit Bakar
- 1973
1. Johor Lama
- 1971
1. Bekok
- 1968
1. Bukit Serampang
- 1967
1. Tampoi
- 1961
1. Pontian Kechil
- 1960
1. Sri Lalang
- 1959
1. Plentong
- 1957
1. Batu Pahat Central
- 1955
1. Johore Bahru Central
2. Kluang

=== Dewan Rakyat ===
- 2023
1. Pulai
- 2019
1. Tanjung Piai
- 1988
1. Johor Bahru
- 1977
1. Panti
- 1973
1. Johore Timor
- 1968
1. Segamat Utara
- 1963
1. Muar Selatan
- 1957
1. Batu Pahat
