= List of former Malaysian state electoral districts =

This is a list of the Malayan state electoral districts used since 1954.

== Perlis ==
Parliamentary constituency	State constituency						
Parliamentary constituency	1955–59*	1959–1974	1974–1986	1986–1995	1995–2004	2004–2018	2018–present
Arau			Bandar Arau				
Arau				Guar Sanji			
Arau			Kayang				
Arau				Kota Raja			
Arau			Kuala Perlis				
Arau			Kurong Anai				
Arau					Pauh		
Arau			Sanglang				
Arau					Simpang Empat		
Arau					Tambun Tulang		
Arau			Utan Aji				
Kangar			Bandar Kangar				
Kangar				Beseri			
Kangar			Bintong				
Kangar			Chuping				
Kangar				Indera Kayangan			
Kangar					Kayang		
Kangar					Kuala Perlis		
Kangar			Oran				
Kangar				Padang Pauh			
Kangar			Paya				
Kangar				Sena			
Kangar			Titi Tinggi				
Padang Besar					Beseri		
Padang Besar					Chuping		
Padang Besar					Mata Ayer		
Padang Besar					Santan		
Padang Besar					Titi Tinggi		
Perlis	Arau						
Perlis	Beseri-Titi Tinggi						
Perlis	Kangar						
Perlis	Kuala Perlis						
Perlis	Kurong Anai						
Perlis	Mata Ayer						
Perlis	Paya						
Perlis	Sanglang						
Perlis	Utan Aji						
Perlis Selatan		Arau					
Perlis Selatan		Kayang					
Perlis Selatan		Kuala Perlis					
Perlis Selatan		Kurong Anai					
Perlis Selatan		Sanglang					
Perlis Selatan		Utan Aji					
Perlis Utara		Bandar Kangar					
Perlis Utara		Bintong					
Perlis Utara		Kaki Bukit					
Perlis Utara		Mata Ayer					
Perlis Utara		Paya					
Perlis Utara		Sena					

== Kedah ==
Parliamentary constituency	State constituency						
Parliamentary constituency	1955–59*	1959–1974	1974–1986	1986–1995	1995–2004	2004–2018	2018–present
Alor Setar							Alor Mengkudu
Alor Setar			Alor Merah				
Alor Setar			Bandar Alor Setar				
Alor Setar				Kota Darul Aman			Kota Darul Aman
Alor Setar							Suka Menanti
Alor Star						Alor Mengkudu	
Alor Star					Alor Merah		
Alor Star		Alor Star Luar					
Alor Star		Alor Star Pekan					
Alor Star	Alor Star-Langkawi						
Alor Star						Bakar Bata	
Alor Star					Derga		
Alor Star					Kota Darul Aman		
Alor Star	Kota Star Timor-Padang						
Baling		Baling Barat					
Baling		Baling Timor					
Baling			Bayu				
Baling						Kuala Ketil	
Baling			Kupang				
Jerai						Guar Chempedak	
Jerai						Gurun	
Jerai		Sala					
Jerai						Sungai Limau	
Jerai			Yan				
Jerai		Yan-Merbok					
Jerlun					Ayer Hitam		
Jerlun					Kota Siputeh		
Jerlun-Langkawi			Jerlun				
Jerlun-Langkawi			Langkawi				
Jitra-Padang Terap		Jitra					
Jitra-Padang Terap		Padang Terap					
Kedah Selatan	Kulim Utara						
Kedah Selatan	Kulim-Bandar Bahru						
Kedah Tengah	Jerai						
Kedah Tengah		Kota					
Kedah Tengah		Sik-Gurun					
Kedah Tengah	Sik-Gurun-Kota						
Kedah Utara	Jitra-Padang Terap						
Kedah Utara	Kubang Pasu Barat						
Kota Setar			Bukit Raya				
Kota Setar				Derga			
Kota Setar				Langgar			
Kota Setar			Langgar-Limbong				
Kota Star	Kota Star Barat Laut						
Kota Star	Kota Star Selatan						
Kota Star Selatan		Kangkong-Bukit Raya					
Kota Star Selatan		Pendang					
Kota Star Utara		Langgar-Limbong					
Kota Star Utara		Pokok Sena					
Kuala Kedah				Alor Janggus			
Kuala Kedah			Anak Bukit		Anak Bukit		
Kuala Kedah					Kubang Rotan		
Kuala Kedah			Pengkalan Kundor				
Kuala Kedah		Kota Star Barat					
Kuala Kedah		Langkawi					
Kuala Muda			Jeniang				
Kuala Muda			Merbok				
Kubang Pasu						Bukit Kayu Hitam	
Kubang Pasu			Jitra				
Kubang Pasu			Tunjang				
Kubang Pasu Barat		Jerlun-Kodiang					
Kubang Pasu Barat		Tunjang					
Kulim Utara		Lunas					
Kulim Utara		Sidam					
Kulim-Bandar Baharu				Bandar Baharu			
Kulim-Bandar Baharu				Kulim			
Kulim-Bandar Bahru		Bandar Bahru					
Kulim-Bandar Bahru		Kulim					
Kulim-Bandar Bahru			Serdang				
Langkawi						Ayer Hangat	
Langkawi					Kuah		
Langkawi					Padang Matsirat		
Merbok					Bukit Selambau		
Merbok				Gurun			
Merbok				Tanjong Dawai			
Padang Serai					Kuala Ketil		
Padang Serai			Lunas				
Padang Serai			Merbau Pulas				
Padang Terap			Kuala Nerang				
Padang Terap					Pedu		
Padang Terap			Pokok Sena				
Pendang				Ayer Puteh			
Pendang				Bukit Raya			
Pendang					Sungai Tiang		
Pendang						Tokai	
Pokok Sena					Bukit Lada		
Pokok Sena						Bukit Pinang	
Pokok Sena						Derga	
Pokok Sena					Langgar		
Pokok Sena					Tanjong Seri		
Sik					Belantek		
Sik				Bukit Selambau			
Sik				Jeneri			
Sungai Petani					Bakar Arang		
Sungai Petani				Pantai Merdeka			
Sungai Petani					Sidam		
Sungai Petani				Tikam Batu			
Sungei Muda	Baling						
Sungei Muda	Sungei Patani						
Sungei Patani			Kuala Ketil				
Sungei Patani		Pekan Sungei Patani					
Sungei Patani		Sungei Patani Luar					
Sungei Patani			Tikam Batu				
Ulu Muda			Pendang				
Ulu Muda			Sik				
Yan					Guar Chempedak		
Yan					Sala		

== Kelantan ==
Parliamentary constituency	State constituency						
Parliamentary constituency	1955–59*	1959–1974	1974–1986	1986–1995	1995–2004	2004–2018	2018–present
Bachok		Bachok Selatan					
Bachok		Bachok Tengah					
Bachok		Bachok Utara					
Bachok			Jelawat				
Bachok							Pantai Irama
Bachok			Perupok				
Bachok			Tawang				
Gua Musang				Dabong			
Gua Musang				Galas			
Gua Musang						Nenggiri	
Gua Musang				Paloh			
Jeli					Air Lanas		
Jeli						Bukit Bunga	
Jeli					Kemahang		
Jeli						Kuala Balah	
Jeli					Pergau		
Kelantan Hilir		Kota Bharu Pantai					
Kelantan Hilir		Kota Bharu Utara					
Kelantan Hilir		Kuala Kelantan					
Kelantan Selatan	Machang						
Kelantan Selatan	Tanah Merah						
Kelantan Selatan	Ulu Kelantan						
Kelantan Tengah	Kota Bharu Bandar						
Kelantan Tengah	Kota Bharu Selatan						
Kelantan Tengah	Kota Bharu Tengah						
Kelantan Timor	Bachok Selatan						
Kelantan Timor	Bachok Utara						
Kelantan Timor	Pasir Puteh Selatan						
Kelantan Timor	Pasir Puteh Utara						
Kelantan Utara	Kota Bharu Utara						
Kelantan Utara	Tumpat Selatan						
Kelantan Utara	Tumpat Utara						
Ketereh						Kadok	
Ketereh						Kok Lanas	
Ketereh						Melor	
Kok Lanas				Ketereh			
Kok Lanas				Pulai Chondong			
Kok Lanas				Selising			
Kota Bharu				Bunut Payong			
Kota Bharu					Kota Lama		
Kota Bharu			Kubang Kerian				
Kota Bharu				Lundang			
Kota Bharu				Padang Garong			
Kota Bharu			Sungei Keladi				
Kota Bharu					Tanjong Mas		
Kota Bharu			Telipot				
Kota Bharu Hilir		Bandar Hilir					
Kota Bharu Hilir		Bandar Hulu					
Kota Bharu Hilir		Kota Bharu Tengah					
Kota Bharu Hulu		Kota Bharu Barat					
Kota Bharu Hulu		Kota Bharu Selatan					
Kota Bharu Hulu		Kota Bharu Timor					
Kuala Krai						Dabong	
Kuala Krai			Guchil				
Kuala Krai				Manek Urai			
Kuala Krai					Mengkebang		
Kuala Krai			Pahi				
Kuala Krai			Temangan				
Kubang Kerian						Demit	
Kubang Kerian					Kenali		
Kubang Kerian					Pasir Tumboh		
Kubang Kerian					Salor		
Machang			Bandar Machang				
Machang				Banggol Judah			
Machang				Gual Ipoh			
Machang					Kemuning		
Machang				Labok			
Machang			Pulai Chondong		Pulai Chondong		
Machang			Sungei Rasau				
Machang						Temangan	
Nilam Puri			Ketereh				
Nilam Puri				Mulong			
Nilam Puri			Peringat				
Nilam Puri			Salor				
Pasir Mas			Bandar Pasir Mas				
Pasir Mas						Chetok	
Pasir Mas			Meranti				Meranti
Pasir Mas	Pasir Mas Selatan						
Pasir Mas	Pasir Mas Tengah						
Pasir Mas	Pasir Mas Utara						
Pasir Mas				Pengkalan Pasir			
Pasir Mas			Tendong				
Pasir Mas					Wakaf Bharu		
Pasir Mas Hilir		Bandar Pasir Mas					
Pasir Mas Hilir		Meranti					
Pasir Mas Hilir		Tendong					
Pasir Mas Hulu		Lemal					
Pasir Mas Hulu		Rantau Panjang					
Pasir Mas Hulu		Tok Uban					
Pasir Puteh			Bandar Pasir Puteh				
Pasir Puteh			Cherang Ruku				
Pasir Puteh				Gaal			
Pasir Puteh				Limbongan			
Pasir Puteh		Pasir Puteh Utara					
Pasir Puteh		Pasir Puteh Tengah					
Pasir Puteh		Pasir Puteh Tenggara					
Pasir Puteh			Selising		Selising		
Pasir Puteh					Semerak		
Pengkalan Chepa				Banggol			
Pengkalan Chepa					Chempaka		
Pengkalan Chepa			Kemumin				
Pengkalan Chepa					Kijang		
Pengkalan Chepa					Panchor		
Pengkalan Chepa			Semut Api				
Pengkalan Chepa			Sering				
Peringat					Kadok		
Peringat					Ketereh		
Peringat					Melor		
Rantau Panjang							Apam Putra
Rantau Panjang				Bukit Tuku			
Rantau Panjang				Chetok			Chetok
Rantau Panjang			Gual Periok				
Rantau Panjang			Lemal				
Rantau Panjang					Meranti		
Rantau Panjang			Tok Uban				
Tanah Merah			Bukit Panau				
Tanah Merah					Chetok		
Tanah Merah			Gual Ipoh		Gual Ipoh		
Tanah Merah				Jeli			
Tanah Merah						Kemahang	
Tanah Merah			Lanas				
Tanah Merah				Panglima Bayu			
Tanah Merah		Machang Utara					
Tanah Merah		Tanah Merah Barat					
Tanah Merah		Tanah Merah Timor					
Tumpat				Geting			
Tumpat					Kelaboran		
Tumpat					Pasir Pekan		
Tumpat					Pengkalan Kubor		
Tumpat			Simpangan				
Tumpat			Sungei Pinang				
Tumpat		Tumpat Barat					
Tumpat		Tumpat Tengah					
Tumpat		Tumpat Timor					
Tumpat			Wakaf Bharu			Wakaf Bharu	
Ulu Kelantan			Gua Musang				
Ulu Kelantan			Jeli				
Ulu Kelantan		Machang Selatan					
Ulu Kelantan			Manek Urai				
Ulu Kelantan		Ulu Kelantan Barat					
Ulu Kelantan		Ulu Kelantan Timor					

== Terengganu ==
Formerly spelled as Trengganu

Parliamentary constituency	State constituency						
Parliamentary constituency	1954–59*	1959–1974	1974–1986	1986–1995	1995–2004	2004–2018	2018–present
Besut		Besut Tengah					
Besut			Bukit Kenak				
Besut				Hulu Besut			
Besut				Jertih			
Besut		Kampong Raja					
Besut				Kampung Raja			
Besut						Kota Putera	
Besut		Kuala Besut					
Besut		Setiu					
Besut		Ulu Besut					
Dungun					Bukit Besi		
Dungun			Jerangau				
Dungun		Marang					
Dungun				Mercang			
Dungun			Merchang				
Dungun				Paka			
Dungun					Rantau Abang		
Dungun		Sura					
Dungun		Ulu Dungun					
Hulu Terengganu					Ajil		
Hulu Terengganu				Kuala Berang			
Hulu Terengganu				Manir			
Hulu Terengganu				Tanggul			
Hulu Terengganu				Telemung			
Kemaman					Air Putih		
Kemaman			Bukit Bandi				
Kemaman		Chukai					
Kemaman				Cukai			
Kemaman		Kemaman Selatan					
Kemaman		Kemaman Utara					
Kemaman			Kemasek				
Kemaman				Kemasik			
Kemaman				Kijal			
Kemaman			Paka				
Kemaman		Paka-Kerteh					
Kuala Nerus			Bukit Payong				
Kuala Nerus			Bukit Tunggal				
Kuala Nerus							Buluh Gading
Kuala Nerus			Jeram				
Kuala Nerus			Manir				
Kuala Nerus				Seberang Takir			
Kuala Nerus				Teluk Pasu			
Kuala Nerus				Tepuh			
Kuala Terengganu				Bandar			
Kuala Terengganu				Batu Buruk			
Kuala Terengganu				Ladang			
Kuala Terengganu				Wakaf Mempelam			
Kuala Trengganu			Bandar				
Kuala Trengganu			Batu Burok				
Kuala Trengganu			Ladang				
Kuala Trengganu			Wakaf Mempelam				
Kuala Trengganu Selatan		Bandar					
Kuala Trengganu Selatan		Batu Burok					
Kuala Trengganu Selatan		Bukit Besar					
Kuala Trengganu Selatan		Ladang					
Kuala Trengganu Utara		Batu Rakit					
Kuala Trengganu Utara		Jeram					
Kuala Trengganu Utara		Kuala Nerus					
Kuala Trengganu Utara		Langkap					
Marang					Alur Limbat		
Marang				Binjai			
Marang				Bukit Payung			
Marang					Pengkalan Berangan		
Marang				Ru Rendang			
Marang				Serada			
Setiu				Batu Rakit			
Setiu				Jabi			
Setiu				Langkap			
Setiu				Permaisuri			
Trengganu Selatan	Dungun						
Trengganu Selatan	Kemaman Selatan						
Trengganu Selatan	Marang						
Trengganu Selatan	Paka-Kemaman Utara						
Trengganu Selatan	Ulu Trengganu						
Trengganu Tengah		Binjai					
Trengganu Tengah	Bukit Besar						
Trengganu Tengah	Kuala Trengganu Barat						
Trengganu Tengah	Kuala Trengganu Selatan						
Trengganu Tengah	Kuala Trengganu Tengah						
Trengganu Tengah	Kuala Trengganu Utara						
Trengganu Tengah		Ulu Trengganu Barat					
Trengganu Tengah		Ulu Trengganu Timor					
Trengganu Utara	Bandar Kuala Trengganu						
Trengganu Utara	Kuala Besut						
Trengganu Utara	Ladang						
Trengganu Utara	Setiu						
Trengganu Utara	Ulu Besut						
Ulu Nerus			Batu Rakit				
Ulu Nerus			Langkap				
Ulu Nerus			Seberang Takir				
Ulu Nerus			Setiu				
Ulu Trengganu			Binjai				
Ulu Trengganu			Kuala Brang				
Ulu Trengganu			Tanggol				
Ulu Trengganu			Telemung				

== Penang ==
Formerly known as Penang Settlement

Parliamentary constituency	State constituency						
Parliamentary constituency	1955–59*	1959–1974	1974–1986	1986–1995	1995–2004	2004–2018	2018–present
Bagan		Bagan Ajam					
Bagan						Bagan Dalam	
Bagan				Bagan Jermal			
Bagan		Butterworth					
Bagan				Mak Mandin			
Bagan					Perai		
Bagan				Prai			
Bagan					Sungai Puyu		
Balik Pulau			Bayan Lepas				
Balik Pulau						Pulau Betong	
Balik Pulau			Sungai Nibong				
Balik Pulau			Telok Bahang				
Balik Pulau				Telok Kumbar			
Batu Kawan						Bukit Tambun	
Batu Kawan						Bukit Tengah	
Batu Kawan						Perai	
Bayan Baru						Batu Maung	
Bayan Baru				Batu Uban			
Bayan Baru				Bukit Gelugor			
Bayan Baru						Pantai Jerejak	
Bayan Baru				Paya Terubong			
Bukit Bendera					Air Itam		
Bukit Bendera						Air Putih	
Bukit Bendera			Ayer Itam				
Bukit Bendera				Kebun Bunga			
Bukit Bendera			Paya Terubong				
Bukit Bendera						Pulau Tikus	
Bukit Bendera			Tanjong Bunga				
Bukit Gelugor						Air Itam	
Bukit Gelugor						Paya Terubong	
Bukit Gelugor						Seri Delima	
Bukit Mertajam				Berapit			
Bukit Mertajam			Bukit Tengah				
Bukit Mertajam			Machang Bubok				
Bukit Mertajam						Padang Lalang	
Bukit Mertajam			Pekan Bukit Mertajam				
Dato Kramat		Sungei Pinang					
Dato Kramat		Tanjong Barat					
Dato Kramat		Tanjong Selatan					
George Town	Kelawei						
George Town	North Coast						
George Town	Tanjong East						
George Town	Tanjong West						
Jelutong				Batu Lancang			
Jelutong			Bukit Gelugor				
Jelutong			Datok Keramat				
Jelutong			Sungai Pinang				
Kepala Batas			Bertam				
Kepala Batas			Penaga				
Kepala Batas				Pinang Tunggal			
Kepala Batas			Tasek Gelugor				
Mata Kuching			Bagan Ajam				
Mata Kuching			Bagan Dalam				
Mata Kuching			Bagan Jermal				
Nibong Tebal			Bukit Tambun				
Nibong Tebal				Jawi			
Nibong Tebal			Sungai Acheh				
Nibong Tebal			Sungai Bakap				
Penang Island	East Coast						
Penang Island	Jelutong						
Penang Island	South Coast						
Penang Island	West Coast						
Penang Selatan		Balik Pulau					
Penang Selatan		Bayan Lepas					
Penang Selatan		Glugor					
Penang Selatan		Jelutong					
Penang Utara		Ayer Itam					
Penang Utara		Doby Ghaut					
Penang Utara		Kelawei					
Penang Utara		Tanjong Bungah					
Permatang Pauh			Kubang Semang				
Permatang Pauh			Penanti				
Permatang Pauh				Permatang Pasir			
Permatang Pauh				Seberang Jaya			
Permatang Pauh			Sungai Dua				
Seberang Selatan		Nibong Tebal					
Seberang Selatan		Sungei Bakap					
Seberang Tengah		Alma					
Seberang Tengah		Bukit Mertajam					
Seberang Tengah		Permatang Pauh					
Seberang Utara		Muda					
Seberang Utara		Kepala Batas					
Seberang Utara		Tasek Glugor					
Tanjong			Kampong Kolam				
Tanjong						Komtar	
Tanjong		Kota					
Tanjong			Padang Kota				
Tanjong			Pengkalan Kota				
Tanjong		Tanjong Tengah					
Tanjong		Tanjong Utara					
Tasek Gelugor				Ara Rendang			
Tasek Gelugor					Permatang Berangan		
Tasek Gelugor				Sungai Dua			
Tasek Gelugor				Telok Ayer Tawar			
Wellesley North	Butterworth						
Wellesley North	Province Wellesley Central						
Wellesley North	Province Wellesley North						
Wellesley South	Batu Kawan						
Wellesley South	Bukit Mertajam						
Wellesley South	Province Wellesley South						

== Perak ==
Parliamentary constituency	State constituency						
Parliamentary constituency	1955–59*	1959–1974	1974–1986	1986–1995	1995–2004	2004–2018	2018–present
Bagan Datok		Hutan Melintang					
Bagan Datok		Rungkup					
Bagan Datuk							Hutan Melintang
Bagan Datuk							Rungkup
Bagan Serai			Alor Pongsu				
Bagan Serai			Gunong Semanggol				
Bagan Serai						Selinsing	
Batang Padang	Batang Padang North						
Batang Padang	Batang Padang South						
Batang Padang			Chenderiang				
Batang Padang		Tapah					
Batang Padang		Tapah Road					
Batu Gajah				Falim			
Batu Gajah						Jelapang	
Batu Gajah			Kampar				
Batu Gajah				Lahat			
Batu Gajah					Menglembu		
Batu Gajah		Pusing					
Batu Gajah		Tanjong Tualang					
Batu Gajah						Tronoh	
Beruas							Astaka
Beruas				Pantai Remis			
Beruas				Pengkalan Baharu			
Bruas		Ayer Tawar					
Bruas			Pantai Remis				
Bruas		Pengkalan Baharu					
Bukit Gantang				Changkat Jering			
Bukit Gantang					Kuala Sapetang		
Bukit Gantang							Kuala Sepetang
Bukit Gantang				Sapetang			
Bukit Gantang					Trong		
Chenderoh					Lenggong		
Chenderoh					Lubok Merbau		
Dindings	Dindings						
Dindings	Taiping						
Gerik			Kenering				
Gerik					Pengkalan Hulu		
Gerik			Temengor				
Gopeng				Chenderong			
Gopeng					Rapat Setia		
Gopeng						Simpang Pulai	
Gopeng						Sungai Rapat	
Gopeng				Teja			
Hilir Perak		Bandar					
Hilir Perak			Kampong Gajah				
Hilir Perak		Sungei Manik					
Ipoh			Guntong				
Ipoh			Kepayang				
Ipoh		Pekan Bharu					
Ipoh		Pekan Lama					
Ipoh				Sungai Pari			
Ipoh				Tasek			
Ipoh-Menglembu	Ipoh North						
Ipoh-Menglembu	Ipoh South						
Ipoh Barat					Bercham		
Ipoh Barat					Buntong		
Ipoh Barat						Kepayang	
Ipoh Timor						Canning	
Ipoh Timor					Pasir Pinji		
Ipoh Timor					Taman Canning		
Ipoh Timor					Tebing Tinggi		
Kampar		Gopeng					
Kampar						Keranji	
Kampar		Kuala Dipang			Kuala Dipang		
Kampar				Malim Nawar			
Kampar				Tanjong Tualang			
Kampar					Tualang Sekah		
Kinta			Chemor				
Kinta			Gopeng				
Kinta Selatan	Kinta South						
Kinta Selatan	Ipoh East						
Kinta Utara	Kinta North						
Kinta Utara	Sungei Siput						
Krian	Krian East						
Krian	Krian West						
Krian Darat		Bagan Serai					
Krian Darat		Gunong Semanggol					
Krian Laut		Kuala Kurau					
Krian Laut		Parit Buntar					
Kuala Kangsar				Batu Hampar			
Kuala Kangsar			Bukit Chandan				
Kuala Kangsar			Manong		Manong		
Kuala Kangsar		Padang Rengas					
Kuala Kangsar		Senggang					
Larut			Batu Kurau				
Larut						Kubu Gajah	
Larut			Selama				
Larut-Matang	Larut South-Matang						
Larut-Matang	Selama-Larut North						
Larut Selatan		Matang					
Larut Selatan		Taiping					
Larut Utara		Larut					
Larut Utara		Selama					
Lenggong						Kenering	
Lenggong						Kota Tampan	
Lumut			Pangkor				
Lumut					Pasir Panjang		
Lumut			Sitiawan				
Matang			Bukit Gantang				
Matang			Changkat Jering				
Menglembu		Kuala Pari					
Menglembu		Pasir Puteh					
Padang Rengas						Chenderoh	
Padang Rengas			Lenggong				
Padang Rengas			Lubok Merbau			Lubok Merbau	
Parit			Belanja				
Parit		Blanja					
Parit			Bota				
Parit		Kampong Gajah					
Parit Buntar			Kuala Kurau				
Parit Buntar			Simpang Lima				
Parit Buntar				Titi Serong			
Pasir Pinji				Dermawan			
Pasir Pinji				Tebing Tinggi			
Pasir Salak				Kampong Gajah			
Pasir Salak				Sungai Manik			
Sitiawan		Lekir					
Sitiawan		Lumut					
Sungai Siput				Jalong			
Sungai Siput				Lintang			
Sungei Perak Hilir	Lower Perak North						
Sungei Perak Hilir	Parit						
Sungei Perak Ulu	Kuala Kangsar						
Sungei Perak Ulu	Upper Perak						
Sungei Siput		Jalong					
Sungei Siput		Karai					
Sungei Siput			Lintang				
Taiping				Asam Kumbang			
Taiping					Aulong		
Taiping			Kamunting				
Taiping			Klian Pauh				
Taiping					Pokok Assam		
Tambun				Chemor			
Tambun					Hulu Kinta		
Tambun					Manjoi		
Tambun				Sungai Rokam			
Tanjong Malim						Behrang	
Tanjong Malim		Bidor					
Tanjong Malim		Slim					
Tanjong Malim				Sungkai			
Tapah				Ayer Kuning			
Tapah				Chenderiang			
Tasek Chenderoh				Lenggong			
Tasek Chenderoh				Lubok Merbau			
Telok Anson		Batak Rabit					
Telok Anson			Changkat Jong				
Telok Anson	Lower Perak South						
Telok Anson		Pasir Bedamar					
Telok Anson	Teluk Anson						
Telok Intan				Changkat Jong			
Telok Intan				Pasir Bedamar			
Teluk Intan							Changkat Jong
Teluk Intan							Pasir Bedamar
Ulu Kinta		Chemor					
Ulu Kinta		Sungei Raia					
Ulu Perak		Grik					
Ulu Perak		Lenggong					

== Pahang ==
Parliamentary constituency	State constituency						
Parliamentary constituency	1955–59*	1959–1974	1974–1986	1986–1995	1995–2004	2004–2018	2018–present
Bentong		Bandar Bentong					
Bentong		Benus					
Bentong				Bilut			
Bentong			Karak				
Bentong					Ketari		
Bentong		Mentakab					
Bentong				Pelangai			
Bentong		Sabai			Sabai		
Bentong			Semantan				
Bera						Guai	
Bera						Kemayan	
Bera						Triang	
Cameron Highlands						Jelai	
Cameron Highlands						Tanah Rata	
Indera Mahkota						Beserah	
Indera Mahkota						Semambu	
Jerantut			Bandar Jerantut				
Jerantut					Damak		
Jerantut			Jenderak				
Jerantut			Kerdau				
Jerantut				Pulau Tawar			
Jerantut			Tahan				
Jerantut			Tembeling				
Kuala Krau						Jenderak	
Kuala Krau						Jengka	
Kuala Krau						Kerdau	
Kuantan			Bandar Kuantan				
Kuantan		Beserah					
Kuantan					Indera Mahkota		
Kuantan						Inderapura	
Kuantan			Sungei Lembing				
Kuantan		Tanah Puteh					
Kuantan						Tanjung Lumpur	
Kuantan		Telok Sisek					
Kuantan				Teruntum			
Kuantan		Ulu Kuantan					
Lipis			Bandar Lipis				
Lipis			Benta			Benta	
Lipis			Bukit Betong				
Lipis				Bukit Betung			
Lipis					Cameron Highlands		
Lipis				Ceka			
Lipis						Cheka	
Lipis		Jelai					
Lipis		Jerantut					
Lipis		Kuala Lipis					
Lipis					Padang Tengku		
Lipis			Tanah Rata				
Lipis		Tanjong Besar					
Maran			Bandar Maran				
Maran				Bukit Tajau			
Maran				Cenur			
Maran			Chenor			Chenor	
Maran					Hulu Jempol		
Maran			Jengka				
Maran						Kuala Sentul	
Maran				Luit			
Maran			Paya Besar				
Mentakab				Jenderak			
Mentakab				Lancang			
Mentakab				Sanggang			
Pahang Timor	Kuantan Barat						
Pahang Timor	Kuantan Timor						
Pahang Timor	Pekan Selatan						
Pahang Timor	Pekan Utara						
Paya Besar					Lepar		
Paya Besar						Panching	
Paya Besar					Penur		
Paya Besar					Sungai Lembing		
Pekan			Bandar Pekan				
Pekan					Bebar		
Pekan			Bukit Ibam				
Pekan			Chini			Chini	
Pekan					Cini		
Pekan		Kuala Pahang					
Pekan		Pahang Tua					
Pekan				Paya Besar			
Pekan				Peramu			
Pekan						Peramu Jaya	
Pekan						Pulau Manis	
Pekan		Rompin					
Raub		Bandar Raub					
Raub			Batu Talam				
Raub				Benta			
Raub		Cameron Highlands					
Raub		Dong					
Raub				Teras			
Raub		Tras				Tras	
Rompin				Bukit Ibam			
Rompin				Cini			
Rompin					Muadzam Shah		
Rompin				Tioman			
Semantan	Bentong Barat						
Semantan	Bentong Timor						
Semantan	Temerloh Selatan						
Semantan	Temerloh Tengah						
Semantan	Temerloh Timor						
Semantan	Temerloh Utara						
Temerloh			Bandar Temerloh				
Temerloh			Bera				
Temerloh		Chenor					
Temerloh					Guai		
Temerloh		Jenderak					
Temerloh		Kuala Semantan				Kuala Semantan	
Temerloh						Lanchang	
Temerloh			Mentakab			Mentakab	
Temerloh		Sanggang					
Temerloh				Semantan			
Temerloh				Teriang			
Temerloh		Triang					
Ulu Pahang	Cameron Highlands						
Ulu Pahang	Lipis Selatan						
Ulu Pahang	Lipis Timor						
Ulu Pahang	Lipis Utara						
Ulu Pahang	Raub Selatan						
Ulu Pahang	Raub Utara						

== Selangor ==
Parliamentary constituency	State constituency						
Parliamentary constituency	1955–59*	1959–1974	1974–1986	1986–1995	1995–2004	2004–2018	2018–present
Ampang						Bukit Antarabangsa	
Ampang						Lembah Jaya	
Ampang Jaya					Ampang		
Ampang Jaya				Keramat			
Ampang Jaya					Lembah Jaya		
Ampang Jaya				Pandan			
Ampang Jaya				Ulu Klang			
Bangi							Balakong
Bangi							Kajang
Bangi							Sungai Ramal
Batu		Kepong					
Batu		Penchala					
Bukit Bintang		Bukit Nanas					
Bukit Bintang		Kampong Bharu					
Bangsar		Pantai					
Bangsar		Salak					
Damansara							Bandar Utama
Damansara							Bukit Lanjan
Damansara		Bukit Raja					
Damansara							Kampung Tunku
Damansara		Serdang					
Gombak						Batu Caves	
Gombak					Gombak Setia		
Gombak					Hulu Kelang		
Gombak					Sungai Tua		Sungai Tua
Hulu Langat					Beranang		
Hulu Langat				Dusun Tua			
Hulu Langat				Kajang			
Hulu Langat				Semenyih		Semenyih	
Hulu Selangor				Batang Kali			
Hulu Selangor					Hulu Bernam		
Hulu Selangor				Kalumpang			
Hulu Selangor				Kuala Kubu Baharu			
Kapar		Jeram		Jeram			
Kapar					Meru		
Kapar				Selat Klang			
Kapar		Sementa		Sementa			
Kapar						Sungai Pinang	
Kelana Jaya						Seri Setia	
Kelana Jaya						Subang Jaya	
Klang							Bandar Baru Klang
Klang					Bandar Klang		
Klang		Kampong Jawa					
Klang				Klang Bandar			
Klang						Kota Alam Shah	
Klang				Pandamaran		Pandamaran	
Klang					Pelabuhan Klang		
Klang		Port Swettenham					
Klang				Teluk Gadung			
Kota Raja							Kota Kemuning
Kota Raja							Sentosa
Kota Raja						Seri Andalas	
Kota Raja						Sri Muda	
Kota Raja							Sungai Kandis
Kuala Langat			Banting				Banting
Kuala Langat		Morib					
Kuala Langat			Panglima Garang				
Kuala Langat					Sijangkang		
Kuala Langat		Telok Datoh					
Kuala Langat					Teluk Datuk		
Kuala Lumpur Barat	Kuala Lumpur Municipality West						
Kuala Lumpur Barat	Kuala Lumpur West						
Kuala Lumpur Timor	Kuala Lumpur East						
Kuala Lumpur Timor	Kuala Lumpur; Municipality East						
Kuala Selangor			Asam Jawa				
Kuala Selangor						Bukit Melawati	
Kuala Selangor					Ijok		
Kuala Selangor			Jeram		Jeram		
Kuala Selangor	Kuala Selangor						
Kuala Selangor		Kuala Selangor Pekan					
Kuala Selangor			Permatang				
Kuala Selangor				Seri Cahaya			
Kuala Selangor				Sungai Tinggi			
Kuala Selangor		Tanjong Karang					
Langat		Kajang					
Langat	Kuala Langat						
Langat		Semenyih					
Langat	Ulu Langat						
Pandan						Chempaka	
Pandan							Pandan Indah
Pandan						Teratai	
Pelabuhan Kelang			Kapar				
Pelabuhan Kelang			Selat Kelang				
Pelabuhan Kelang			Sementa				
Petaling			Petaling Jaya				
Petaling			Serdang				
Petaling			Sungei Way				
Petaling Jaya							Bukit Gasing
Petaling Jaya				Damansara Utama			
Petaling Jaya				Kelana Jaya			
Petaling Jaya							Seri Setia
Petaling Jaya				Taman Aman			
Petaling Jaya							Taman Medan
Petaling Jaya Selatan					Bukit Gasing		
Petaling Jaya Selatan					Taman Medan		
Petaling Jaya Utara					Damansara Utama		
Petaling Jaya Utara					Kampung Tunku		
Puchong				Bukit Gasing			
Puchong						Kinrara	
Puchong				Lindungan			
Puchong				Serdang			
Puchong							Seri Kembangan
Puchong						Seri Serdang	
Rawang		Kuang					
Rawang		Serendah					
Sabak Bernam		Sabak					
Sabak Bernam					Sungai Air Tawar		
Sabak Bernam				Sungai Ayer Tawar			
Sabak Bernam				Sungai Besar			
Sabak Bernam			Sungei Ayer Tawar				
Sabak Bernam		Sungei Besar					
Selangor Barat	Klang North						
Selangor Barat	Klang South						
Selangor Tengah	Kuala Lumpur; Municipality South						
Selangor Tengah	Kuala Lumpur South						
Selayang			Ampang				
Selayang			Gombak				
Selayang				Gombak Setia			
Selayang						Kuang	
Selayang				Paya Jaras			
Selayang			Rawang				
Selayang					Selayang Baharu		
Selayang						Taman Templer	
Sepang			Batu Laut				
Sepang		Dengkil					
Sepang			Sungei Pelek				
Sepang		Sungei Rawang					
Sepang						Tanjong Sepat	
Serdang					Balakong		
Serdang						Bangi	
Serdang					Puchong		
Serdang						Seri Kembangan	
Serdang					Sri Kembangan		
Setapak		Ampang					
Setapak		Sentul					
Shah Alam			Bandar Kelang				
Shah Alam				Batu Tiga			
Shah Alam			Bukit Raja				
Shah Alam			Kampong Jawa				
Shah Alam						Kota Anggerik	
Shah Alam					Kota Raja		
Shah Alam				Shahbandar Raya			
Shah Alam				Subang			
Shah Alam					Sungai Renggam		
Subang					Bukit Lanjan		
Subang					Kelana Jaya		
Subang							Kinrara
Subang						Kota Damansara	
Subang						Paya Jaras	
Subang					Subang Jaya		Subang Jaya
Sungai Besar						Sekinchan	
Sungai Besar						Sungai Panjang	
Sungai Buloh							Kota Damansara
Sungai Buloh							Paya Jaras
Tanjong Karang						Permatang	
Tanjong Karang			Sekinchan				
Tanjong Karang				Sungai Burong		Sungai Burong	
Tanjong Karang					Sungai Burung		
Tanjong Karang				Sungai Panjang			
Tanjong Karang			Sungei Burong				
Tanjong Karang			Sungei Panjang				
Ulu Langat			Dusun Tua				
Ulu Langat			Kajang				
Ulu Langat			Semenyih				
Ulu Selangor			Batang Kali				
Ulu Selangor			Kalumpang				
Ulu Selangor		Kuala Kubu					
Ulu Selangor			Kuala Kubu Baru				
Ulu Selangor	Sabak Bernam						
Ulu Selangor	Selangor Ulu						
Ulu Selangor		Ulu Bernam					

== Negeri Sembilan ==
Formerly spelled as Negri Sembilan

Parliamentary constituency	State constituency						
Parliamentary constituency	1955–59*	1959–1974	1974–1986	1986–1995	1995–2004	2004–2018	2018–present
Jelebu			Bahau				
Jelebu					Chennah		
Jelebu			Jempol				
Jelebu				Klawang			
Jelebu			Kuala Klawang				
Jelebu				Peradong			
Jelebu			Pertang				
Jelebu				Sungai Lui			
Jelebu-Jempol		Bahau					
Jelebu-Jempol		Jempol					
Jelebu-Jempol		Kuala Klawang					
Jelebu-Jempol		Pertang					
Jelebu-Jempol		Rompin					
Jempol				Bahau			
Jempol				Batu Kikir			
Jempol					Jeram Padang		
Jempol				Palong			
Jempol				Serting			
Kuala Pilah		Johol					
Kuala Pilah				Juasseh			
Kuala Pilah		Pilah					
Kuala Pilah					Senaling		
Kuala Pilah				Seri Menanti			
Kuala Pilah		Sri Menanti					
Kuala Pilah		Ulu Muar					
Mantin			Labu				
Mantin			Lenggeng				
Mantin			Pantai				
Mantin			Rantau				
Negri Sembilan Selatan	Linggi						
Negri Sembilan Selatan	Port Dickson						
Negri Sembilan Selatan	Rembau						
Negri Sembilan Selatan	Tampin						
Negri Sembilan Utara	Jelebu						
Negri Sembilan Utara	Jempol						
Negri Sembilan Utara	Johol						
Negri Sembilan Utara	Pilah						
Port Dickson							Bagan Pinang
Port Dickson							Chuah
Port Dickson		Jimah					
Port Dickson		Linggi					Linggi
Port Dickson		Lukut					Lukut
Port Dickson		Pasir Panjang					
Port Dickson		Si Rusa					
Port Dickson							Sri Tanjung
Rasah						Bukit Kepayang	
Rasah				Jimah			
Rasah				Labu			
Rasah				Mambau			
Rasah					Rahang		
Rasah				Rantau			
Rasah						Senawang	
Rasah							Seremban Jaya
Rasah					Temiang		
Rembau						Chembong	
Rembau						Kota	
Rembau						Paroi	
Rembau						Rantau	
Rembau-Tampin		Gemas					
Rembau-Tampin		Kota					
Rembau-Tampin		Tampin					
Rembau-Tampin		Terentang					
Seremban				Ampangan			
Seremban	Labu						
Seremban	Lenggeng			Lenggeng			
Seremban					Lobak		
Seremban					Nilai		
Seremban			Rahang				
Seremban	Rantau						
Seremban			Rasah				
Seremban					Senawang		
Seremban	Seremban						
Seremban						Sikamat	
Seremban				Sungai Ujong			
Seremban			Sungei Ujong				
Seremban						Temiang	
Seremban			Terentang				
Seremban Barat		Bukit Nanas					
Seremban Barat		Labu					
Seremban Barat		Lenggeng					
Seremban Timor		Rahang					
Seremban Timor		Rantau					
Seremban Timor		Sungei Ujong					
Tampin			Gemas				
Tampin			Gemencheh				
Tampin			Kota				
Tampin				Repah			
Tampin			Rompin				
Telok Kemang						Bagan Pinang	
Telok Kemang				Chembong			
Telok Kemang						Chuah	
Telok Kemang			Jimah				
Telok Kemang			Linggi				
Telok Kemang					Lukut		
Telok Kemang			Pasir Panjang				
Telok Kemang						Port Dickson	
Telok Kemang			Si Rusa				

== Malacca ==
Formerly known as Malacca Settlement

Parliamentary constituency	State constituency						
Parliamentary constituency	1955–59*	1959–1974	1974–1986	1986–1995	1995–2004	2004–2018	2018–present
Alor Gajah						Asahan	
Alor Gajah						Durian Tunggal	
Alor Gajah						Gadek	
Alor Gajah			Kelemak				
Alor Gajah				Kuala Linggi			
Alor Gajah			Machap			Machap	
Alor Gajah							Machap Jaya
Alor Gajah			Masjid Tanah				
Alor Gajah					Melekek		
Alor Gajah					Ramuan China		
Alor Gajah						Rembia	
Alor Gajah				Sungai Bahru			
Alor Gajah					Sungai Udang		
Alor Gajah			Sungei Bahru				
Alor Gajah			Taboh Naning				
Bandar Malacca		Kota Barat					
Bandar Malacca		Kota Selatan					
Bandar Malacca		Kota Tengah					
Bandar Malacca		Kota Timor					
Bandar Malacca		Kota Utara					
Batu Berendam			Ayer Keroh		Ayer Keroh		
Batu Berendam			Ayer Molek				
Batu Berendam					Bachang		
Batu Berendam			Bukit Rambai				
Batu Berendam				Krubong			
Batu Berendam					Paya Rumput		
Batu Berendam				Sungai Udang			
Batu Berendam			Sungei Udang				
Batu Berendam					Tangga Batu		
Batu Berendam			Tanjong Minyak				
Bukit Katil						Ayer Keroh	
Bukit Katil						Ayer Molek	
Bukit Katil						Bachang	
Bukit Katil						Bukit Baru	
Hang Tuah Jaya							Ayer Keroh
Hang Tuah Jaya							Ayer Molek
Hang Tuah Jaya							Bukit Katil
Hang Tuah Jaya							Pengkalan Batu
Jasin			Ayer Panas				
Jasin			Batang Melaka				
Jasin						Bemban	
Jasin					Merlimau		
Jasin			Nyalas				
Jasin				Rim			
Jasin			Serkam				
Jasin				Sungai Rambai			
Jasin			Sungei Rambai				
Kota Melaka					Alai		
Kota Melaka			Bandar Hilir				
Kota Melaka			Durian Daun				
Kota Melaka					Duyong		
Kota Melaka						Kesidang	
Kota Melaka						Kota Laksamana	
Kota Melaka			Kubu				
Kota Melaka			Peringgit				
Kota Melaka						Telok Mas	
Kota Melaka					Tengkera		
Kota Melaka			Tranquerah				
Malacca Central	East Central						
Malacca Central	East Fort						
Malacca Central	West Central						
Malacca Central	West Fort						
Malacca Luar	Alor Gajah East						
Malacca Luar	Alor Gajah West						
Malacca Luar	Jasin North						
Malacca Luar	Jasin South						
Malacca Selatan		Batang Malacca					
Malacca Selatan		Jasin					
Malacca Selatan		Rim					
Malacca Selatan		Serkam					
Malacca Selatan		Sungei Rambai					
Malacca Tengah		Batu Berendam					
Malacca Tengah		Bukit Rambai					
Malacca Tengah		Kandang					
Malacca Tengah		Semabok					
Malacca Tengah		Tanjong Kling					
Malacca Utara		Alor Gajah					
Malacca Utara		Masjid Tanah					
Malacca Utara		Pulau Sebang					
Malacca Utara		Ramuan China					
Malacca Utara		Sungei Bahru					
Masjid Tanah						Ayer Limau	
Masjid Tanah						Kuala Linggi	
Masjid Tanah						Lendu	
Masjid Tanah						Taboh Naning	
Masjid Tanah						Tanjung Bidara	
Selandar				Bukit Asahan			
Selandar					Bukit Sedanan		
Selandar					Durian Tunggal		
Selandar				Kemuning			
Selandar				Pulau Sebang			
Selandar					Rembia		
Selandar				Tebong			
Tangga Batu						Kelebang	
Tangga Batu						Pantai Kundor	
Tangga Batu						Paya Rumput	
Tangga Batu						Sungai Udang	

== Johor ==
Formerly spelled as Johore

Parliamentary constituency	State constituency						
Parliamentary constituency	1954–59*	1959–1974	1974–1986	1986–1995	1995–2004	2004–2018	2018–present
Ayer Hitam						Semarang	
Ayer Hitam			Sri Lalang				
Ayer Hitam			Sri Medan				
Ayer Hitam						Yong Peng	
Bakri						Bentayan	
Bakri				Bukit Naning			
Bakri				Maharani			
Bakri							Simpang Jeram
Bakri						Sungai Abong	
Batu Pahat		Bandar Penggaram					
Batu Pahat	Batu Pahat Central						
Batu Pahat	Batu Pahat Coastal						
Batu Pahat		Broleh					
Batu Pahat				Penggaram			
Batu Pahat			Rengit				
Batu Pahat						Senggarang	
Batu Pahat Dalam		Ayer Hitam					
Batu Pahat Dalam		Tanjong Sembrong					
Gelang Patah						Nusa Jaya	
Gelang Patah					Skudai		
Gelang Patah					Tanjong Kupang		
Iskandar Puteri							Kota Iskandar
Iskandar Puteri							Skudai
Johor Bahru				Gertak Merah			
Johor Bahru							Larkin
Johor Bahru					Stulang		
Johor Bahru				Tanjong Puteri			
Johore Bahru	Johore Bahru Central						
Johore Bahru	Johore Bahru Coastal						
Johore Bahru			Tanjong Petri				
Johore Bahru			Tiram				
Johore Bahru Barat		Glang Patah					
Johore Bahru Barat		Tampoi					
Johore Bahru Timor		Plentong					
Johore Bahru Timor		Tanjong Petri					
Johore Selatan	Johore Bahru Inland						
Johore Selatan	Pontian						
Johore Tengah	Kluang						
Johore Tengah	Muar Inland						
Johore Tenggara		Johore Lama					
Johore Tenggara		Kota Tinggi					
Johore Timor		Endau					
Johore Timor	Kota Tinggi						
Johore Timor	Mersing						
Kluang			Bandar Kluang				
Kluang			Bekok				
Kluang				Gunung Lambak			
Kluang						Mahkota	
Kluang					Mengkibol		
Kluang				Paloh			
Kluang Selatan		Renggam					
Kluang Selatan		Senai-Kulai					
Kluang Utara		Gunong Lambak					
Kluang Utara		Sri Lalang					
Kota Tinggi						Johor Lama	
Kota Tinggi				Pengerang			
Kota Tinggi				Sedili			
Kulai						Bukit Batu	
Kulai						Bukit Permai	
Kulai						Senai	
Labis			Ayer Panas				
Labis				Bekok			
Labis			Buloh Kasap				
Labis				Tenang			
Ledang						Gambir	
Ledang			Serom				
Ledang			Tangkak				
Mersing				Endau			
Mersing				Tenggaroh			
Muar			Bandar Maharani				
Muar						Maharani	
Muar				Parit Bakar			
Muar			Parit Jawa				
Muar					Sungai Balang		
Muar Dalam		Bukit Serampang					
Muar Dalam		Jorak					
Muar Pantai		Bandar Maharani					
Muar Pantai		Parit Bakar					
Muar Selatan	Batu Pahat Inland						
Muar Selatan	Muar Coastal						
Muar Selatan		Parit Jawa					
Muar Selatan		Simpang Kiri					
Muar Utara	Muar Central						
Muar Utara		Serom					
Muar Utara	Tangkak						
Pagoh							Bukit Kepong
Pagoh							Bukit Pasir
Pagoh				Bukit Serampang			
Pagoh			Jorak				
Pagoh			Kesang				
Panti			Johore Lama				
Panti			Kota Tinggi				
Parit Sulong				Semerah			
Parit Sulong				Sri Medan			
Pasir Gudang						Johor Jaya	
Pasir Gudang						Permas	
Pengerang						Penawar	
Pengerang						Tanjong Surat	
Pengerang							Tanjung Surat
Pontian			Benut			Benut	
Pontian			Kukup				
Pontian				Pulai Sebatang			
Pontian Selatan		Pontian Dalam					
Pontian Selatan		Pontian Kechil					
Pontian Utara		Benut					
Pontian Utara		Rengit					
Pulai			Gelang Patah				
Pulai					Kempas		
Pulai							Perling
Pulai						Pengkalan Rinting	
Pulai			Skudai				
Pulai				Tambatan			
Renggam			Kulai				
Renggam			Layang-layang				
Segamat			Bandar Segamat				
Segamat			Bukit Serampang				
Segamat						Buloh Kasap	
Segamat				Jementah			
Segamat	Segamat North						
Segamat	Segamat South						
Segamat				Sepinang			
Segamat Selatan		Bekok					
Segamat Selatan		Labis					
Segamat Utara		Bandar Segamat					
Segamat Utara		Batu Anam					
Sekijang						Kemelah	
Sekijang						Pemanis	
Sembrong						Kahang	
Sembrong						Paloh	
Semerah			Peserai				
Semerah			Sri Menanti				
Senai				Bandar Tenggara			
Senai					Bukit Permai		
Senai				Kulai			
Simpang Renggam						Machap	
Simpang Renggam						Layang-layang	
Sri Gading			Parit Raja				
Sri Gading				Parit Yaani			
Sri Gading			Simpang Renggam				
Sungai Benut				Benut			
Sungai Benut				Simpang Renggam			
Tanjong Piai						Kukup	
Tanjong Piai						Pekan Nenas	
Tanjung Piai							Kukup
Tanjung Piai							Pekan Nanas
Tebrau				Pasir Gudang			
Tebrau						Puteri Wangsa	
Tebrau				Tiram			
Tenggara					Gunung Lambak		
Tenggara					Panti		
Tenggara						Pasir Raja	
Tenggaroh			Endau				
Tenggaroh			Mersing				

== Sabah ==
Parliamentary constituency	State constituency					
Parliamentary constituency	1967–1974	1974–1985	1985–1995	1995–2004	2004–2020	2020–present
Bandau	Langkon					
Bandau		Matunggong				
Bandau	Tandek					
Batu Sapi					Karamunting	
Batu Sapi					Sekong	
Beaufort				Bongowan		
Beaufort				Klias		
Beaufort				Kuala Penyu		
Beluran				Labuk		
Beluran				Sugut		
Beluran						Telupid
Darvel	Lahad Datu					
Darvel	Semporna					
Gaya			Api-Api			
Gaya				Inanam		
Gaya		Kota Kinabalu				
Gaya		Likas				
Gaya		Tanjong Aru				
Hilir Padas		Klias				
Hilir Padas		Labuan				
Hilir Padas		Lumadan				
Jambongan			Labuk			
Jambongan			Sugut			
Jambongan			Sungai Sibuga			
Kalabakan						Kukusan
Kalabakan					Merotai	
Kalabakan					Sebatik	
Kalabakan					Tanjong Batu	
Kalabakan						Tanjung Batu
Keningau		Bingkor				
Keningau					Liawan	
Keningau		Pensiangan		Pensiangan		
Keningau		Sook				
Keningau			Tambunan			
Kimanis	Bongawan				Bongawan	
Kimanis	Kuala Penyu					
Kimanis					Membakut	
Kimanis		Papar				
Kinabalu		Kundasang				
Kinabalu	Ranau					
Kinabalu	Tambunan					
Kinabatangan	Lamag					Lamag
Kinabatangan	Kuala Kinabatangan					
Kinabatangan		Kuamut				
Kinabatangan		Sekong				
Kinabatangan			Sukau			
Kota Belud			Kadamaian			
Kota Belud		Kebuyau				
Kota Belud						Pintasan
Kota Belud	Sorob					
Kota Belud		Tempasuk				
Kota Belud	Usukan					
Kota Kinabalu					Api-Api	
Kota Kinabalu	Jesselton Bandar					
Kota Kinabalu					Likas	
Kota Kinabalu					Luyang	
Kota Kinabalu	Tanjong Aru					
Kota Marudu						Bandau
Kota Marudu					Matunggong	
Kota Marudu					Tandek	
Kudat					Banggi	
Kudat						Bengkoka
Kudat					Pitas	
Kudat					Tanjong Kapor	
Labuan-Beaufort	Beaufort					
Labuan-Beaufort	Labuan					
Labuk-Sugut	Labuk					
Labuk-Sugut		Semawang				
Labuk-Sugut	Sugut					
Lahad Datu						Kunak
Lahad Datu						Tungku
Lahad Datu						Segama
Lahad Datu						Silam
Libaran					Gum-Gum	
Libaran				Sekong		
Libaran				Sungai Sibuga		
Libaran						Sungai Manila
Limbawang			Klias			
Limbawang			Lumadan			
Marudu		Banggi				
Marudu		Bengkoka				
Marudu	Bengkoka-Banggi					
Marudu	Kudat					
Padas			Kemabong			
Padas			Sipitang			
Padas			Tenom			
Papar			Buang Sayang			
Papar			Kawang			
Papar						Limbahau
Papar				Pantai Manis		
Penampang		Inanam				
Penampang					Kapayan	
Penampang		Kawang				
Penampang	Moyog					
Penampang	Papar					
Penampang				Petagas		
Pensiangan			Nabawan		Nabawan	
Pensiangan			Sook		Sook	
Pensiangan						Tulid
Putatan					Petagas	
Putatan					Tanjong Aru	
Putatan						Tanjung Aru
Putatan						Tanjung Keramat
Ranau					Karanaan	
Ranau					Kundasang	
Ranau					Paginatan	
Sabah Dalam	Keningau					
Sabah Dalam	Pensiangan-Sook					
Sabah Selatan	Sipitang-Ulu Padas					
Sabah Selatan	Tenom					
Sandakan		Bandar Sandakan				
Sandakan	Elopura					
Sandakan		Karamunting				
Sandakan	Sandakan Bandar					
Sandakan			Tanjong Papat			
Semporna			Balung			
Semporna					Bugaya	
Semporna				Senallang		
Semporna			Sulabayan			
Sepanggar						Darau
Sepanggar					Inanam	
Sepanggar					Karambunai	
Silam		Kunak				
Silam		Lahad Datu				
Silam		Semporna				
Silam					Tungku	
Sipitang				Lumadan		
Sipitang				Sindumin		
Tanjong Aru				Api-Api		
Tanjong Aru			Petagas			
Tanjong Aru			Sembulan			
Tawau					Apas	
Tawau	Balung				Balung	
Tawau		Bandar Tawau				
Tawau				Kalabakan		
Tawau	Merotai					
Tawau			Sri Tanjong			
Tenom				Kemabong		
Tenom				Melalap		
Tuaran	Kiulu					
Tuaran						Pantai Dalit
Tuaran	Sulaman					
Tuaran		Tamparuli				
Ulu Padas		Kemabong				
Ulu Padas		Sipitang				
Ulu Padas		Tenom				

== Sarawak ==
Parliamentary constituency	State constituency					
Parliamentary constituency	1969–1978	1978–1990	1990–1999	1999–2008	2008–2016	2016−present
Bandar Kuching			Batu Lintang			Batu Lintang
Bandar Kuching	Kuching Barat					
Bandar Kuching	Kuching Timor					
Bandar Kuching		Padungan				
Bandar Kuching			Pending			
Bandar Kuching		Stampin				
Bandar Sibu	Sibu Luar					
Bandar Sibu	Sibu Tengah					
Baram	Marudi					
Baram						Mulu
Baram	Telang Usan					
Batang Lupar			Beladin			
Batang Lupar				Beting Maro		
Batang Lupar		Lingga			Lingga	
Batang Lupar	Lingga-Sebuyau					
Batang Lupar			Sebuyau			
Batang Lupar	Simanggang					
Batang Lupar		Sri Aman				
Batang Sadong						Gedong
Batang Sadong				Sadong Jaya		
Batang Sadong			Semera			
Batang Sadong			Simunjan			
Bau-Lundu	Bau					
Bau-Lundu	Lundu					
Betong					Bukit Saban	
Betong	Layar					
Betong	Saribas					
Bintulu				Jepak		
Bintulu	Kemena					
Bintulu			Kidurong			
Bintulu						Samalaju
Bintulu						Tanjong Batu
Bintulu	Tatau					
Bukit Mas				Ba'kelalan		
Bukit Mas		Lawas				
Bukit Mas		Limbang				
Hulu Rajang			Baleh			
Hulu Rajang			Belaga			
Hulu Rajang						Murum
Igan					Daro	
Igan					Jemoreng	
Julau	Meluan					
Julau	Pakan					
Kanowit	Machan					
Kanowit	Ngemah					
Kapit						Bukit Goram
Kapit		Katibas				
Kapit	Song					
Kapit	Pelagus					
Kota Samarahan			Asajaya			
Kota Samarahan			Muara Tuang			
Kota Samarahan						Stakan
Kuala Rajang			Belawai			
Kuala Rajang			Matu-Daro			
Kuala Rajang			Serdeng			
Lambir		Miri				
Lambir		Subis				
Lanang			Bukit Assek			
Lanang			Dudong			
Lawas					Ba'kelalan	
Lawas					Bukit Sari	
Limbang					Batu Danau	
Limbang					Bukit Kota	
Limbang-Lawas	Limbang					
Limbang-Lawas	Lawas					
Lubok Antu		Batang Ai				Batang Ai
Lubok Antu					Batang Air	
Lubok Antu		Engkilili				
Lubok Antu	Engkilili-Skrang					
Lubok Antu	Ulu Ai					
Mambong				Bengoh		
Mambong				Tarat		
Mas Gading		Lundu				
Mas Gading					Opar	
Mas Gading			Tanjong Datu			
Mas Gading		Tasik Biru				
Miri			Lambir			
Miri			Piasau			
Miri					Pujut	
Miri				Senadin		
Miri-Subis	Miri					
Miri-Subis	Subis					
Mukah	Balingian					
Mukah			Dalat			
Mukah	Oya					
Mukah						Tellian
Padawan	Batu Kawah					
Padawan	Bengoh					
Paloh		Kuala Rajang				
Paloh		Matu-Daro				
Payang	Binatang					
Payang	Matu-Daro					
Petra Jaya				Samariang		
Petra Jaya			Satok			
Petra Jaya			Tupong			
Puncak Borneo						Mambong
Puncak Borneo						Serembu
Puncak Borneo						Tarat
Rajang	Dudong					
Rajang	Igan					
Samarahan	Muara Tuang					
Samarahan	Sebandi					
Santubong				Demak Laut		
Santubong			Pantai Damai			
Santubong		Petra Jaya				
Santubong		Satok				
Santubong			Sejingkat			
Santubong	Sekama					
Santubong	Semariang					
Santubong					Tanjong Datu	
Saratok						Kabong
Saratok	Kalaka					
Saratok	Krian					
Sarikei	Kuala Rajang					
Sarikei		Meradong				
Sarikei	Repok					
Selangau			Kakus			
Selangau			Tamin			
Serian						Bukit Semuja
Serian				Kedup		
Serian	Tarat					
Serian	Tebakang					
Serian			Tebedu			
Sibu			Bawang Assan			
Sibu		Maling				
Sibu				Nangka		
Sibu				Pelawan		
Sibu		Seduan				
Sibuti					Bekenu	
Sibuti					Lambir	
Simunjan	Gedong					
Simunjan	Semera					
Sri Aman					Balai Ringin	
Sri Aman			Bukit Begunan			
Sri Aman			Simanggang			
Stampin				Batu Kawah		
Stampin						Batu Kitang
Stampin				Batu Lintang		
Stampin					Kota Sentosa	
Tanjong Manis					Belawai	
Tanjong Manis						Kuala Rajang
Tanjong Manis					Semop	
Ulu Rajang	Baleh					
Ulu Rajang	Belaga					
