= Elections in Malacca =

Political elections for public offices in Malacca

Elections in Malacca have been held in the Malaysian state of Malacca since 1955 and have chosen Malacca's elected representatives in the Dewan Rakyat and Dewan Undangan Negeri (the Malaysian federal and state assemblies).

== Federal level ==
=== Federal constituencies ===
- List of Malayan federal electoral districts (1955–1959)#Malacca
- List of former Malaysian federal electoral districts#Malacca
- List of Malaysian electoral districts#Malacca

== State level ==
=== State constituencies ===
- List of Malayan state and settlement electoral districts (1954–1959)#Malacca
- List of former Malaysian state electoral districts#Malacca

== By-Elections ==
=== State Assembly ===
- 2011
1. Merlimau
- 2007
1. Machap
- 1997
1. Melekek
- 1996
1. Bukit Asahan
- 1991
1. Serkam
- 1990
1. Kuala Linggi
- 1974
1. Sungei Bahru
- 1966
1. Sungei Bahru
- 1960
1. Kota Tengah

=== Dewan Rakyat ===
- 1971
1. Malacca Selatan
