= Elections in Negeri Sembilan =

Malaysian state elections

Elections in Negeri Sembilan (formally Negri Sembilan) have been held in the Malaysian state of Negeri Sembilan since 1955 and have chosen Negeri Sembilan's elected representatives in the Dewan Rakyat and Dewan Undangan Negeri (the Malaysian federal and state assemblies).

== Federal level ==
=== Federal constituencies ===
- List of Malayan federal electoral districts (1955–1959)#Negri Sembilan
- List of former Malaysian federal electoral districts § Negeri Sembilan
- List of Malaysian electoral districts § Negeri Sembilan

== State level ==
=== State constituencies ===
- List of Malayan state and settlement electoral districts (1954–1959)#Negri Sembilan
- List of former Malaysian state electoral districts § Negeri Sembilan

== By-Elections ==
=== State Assembly ===
- 2019
1. Rantau
- 2009
1. Bagan Pinang
- 1997
1. Repah
- 1982
1. Gemencheh
- 1981
1. Ulu Muar
- 1977
1. Jempol
- 1965
1. Rahang
- 1962
1. Gemas

=== Dewan Rakyat ===
- 2018
1. Port Dickson
- 2000
1. Telok Kemang
- 1983
1. Tampin
2. Seremban
- 1972
1. Rembau-Tampin
