= Elections in Kedah =

Elections in Malaysian state

Elections in Kedah have been held in the Malaysian state of Kedah since 1955 and have chosen Kedah's elected representatives in the Dewan Rakyat and Dewan Undangan Negeri (the Malaysian federal and state assemblies).

== Federal level ==
=== Federal constituencies ===
- List of Malayan federal electoral districts (1955–1959)#Kedah
- List of former Malaysian federal electoral districts#Kedah
- List of Malaysian electoral districts#Kedah

== State level ==
=== State constituencies ===
- List of Malayan state and settlement electoral districts (1954–1959)#Kedah
- List of former Malaysian state electoral districts#Kedah

== By-Elections ==
=== State Assembly ===
- 2013
1. Sungai Limau
- 2009
1. Bukit Selambau
- 2002
1. Anak Bukit
- 2000
1. Lunas
- 1991
1. Bayu
2. Jerlun
- 1990
1. Pantai Merdeka
- 1980
1. Bukit Raya
- 1976
1. Lunas
- 1975
1. Merbok
- 1971
1. Yen-Merbok
2. Sidam
- 1968
1. Baling Barat
2. Pendang
- 1965
1. Jitra

=== Dewan Rakyat ===
- 2022
1. Padang Serai
- 2002
1. Pendang
- 1992
1. Jerai
- 1983
1. Ulu Muda
- 1973
1. Kuala Kedah
- 1959
1. Kedah Tengah
