= Elections in Terengganu =

Elections in Terengganu (formerly Trengganu) have been held in the Malaysian state of Terengganu since 1954 and have chosen Terengganu's elected representatives in the Dewan Rakyat and Dewan Undangan Negeri (the Malaysian federal and state assemblies).

== Federal level ==
=== Federal constituencies ===
- List of Malayan federal electoral districts (1955–1959)#Trengganu
- List of former Malaysian federal electoral districts#Terengganu
- List of Malaysian electoral districts#Terengganu

== State level ==
=== State constituencies ===
- List of Malayan state and settlement electoral districts (1954–1959)#Trengganu
- List of former Malaysian state electoral districts#Terengganu

== By-Elections ==
=== State Assembly ===
- 2013
1. Kuala Besut (following the death of Abdul Rahman Mokhtar)
- 2004
1. Kuala Berang (following the death of Komaruddin Abd Rahman)
- 1993
1. Kampung Raja (following the death of Abdullah Muhamad)
- 1992
1. Bukit Payung (election declared null and void)
- 1990
1. Kijal (following the resignation of Mohamad Md. Amin)
- 1989
1. Teluk Pusu (following the death of Ismail Yusof)
- 1982
1. Binjai (following the death of Mohamed Nor Ali)
- 1979
1. Kuala Besut (following the death of Zakaria Muda)
- 1973
1. Kuala Nerus (following the death of Ibrahim Fikri Mohamad)
- 1971
1. Batu Rakit (following the resignation of Mansor Mohamed)

=== Dewan Rakyat ===
- 2023
1. Kuala Terengganu
2. Kemaman
- 2009
1. Kuala Terengganu
- 1976
1. Kemaman
- 1962
1. Kuala Trengganu Selatan
