= Elections in Kelantan =

Election in the Malaysian state of Kelantan

Elections in Kelantan have been held in the Malaysian state of Kelantan since 1955 and have chosen Kelantan's elected representatives in the Dewan Rakyat and Dewan Undangan Negeri (the Malaysian federal and state assemblies).

== Federal level ==
=== Federal constituencies ===
- List of Malayan federal electoral districts (1955–1959)#Kelantan
- List of former Malaysian federal electoral districts#Kelantan
- List of Malaysian electoral districts#Kelantan

== State level ==
=== State constituencies ===
- List of Malayan state and settlement electoral districts (1954–1959)#Kelantan
- List of former Malaysian state electoral districts#Kelantan

== By-Elections ==
=== State Assembly ===
- 2024
1. Nenggiri
- 2015
1. Chempaka
- 2013
1. Pengkalan Kubor
- 2010
1. Galas
- 2009
1. Manek Urai
- 2005
1. Pengkalan Pasir
- 1997
1. Pulai Chondong
2. Semerak
- 1994
1. Lundang
- 1991
1. Limbongan
2. Sungai Pinang
- 1987
1. Bukit Tuku
- 1983
1. Selising
2. Kemumin
- 1978
1. Tendong
- 1974
1. Pasir Puteh Tengah
- 1973
1. Kota Bharu Tengah
- 1972
1. Tumpat Barat
- 1978
1. Bachok Utara
- 1964
1. Tumpat Tengah
- 1962
1. Rantau Panjang

=== Dewan Rakyat ===
- 1995
1. Gua Musang
- 1967
1. Pasir Mas Hulu
2. Kelantan Hilir
- 1964
1. Bachok
