= Elections in Pahang =

Malaysian parliamentary elections

Elections in Pahang have been held in the Malaysian state of Pahang since 1955 and have chosen Pahang's elected representatives in the Dewan Rakyat and Dewan Undangan Negeri (the Malaysian federal and state assemblies).

== Federal level ==
=== Federal constituencies ===
- List of Malayan federal electoral districts (1955–1959)#Pahang
- List of former Malaysian federal electoral districts#Pahang
- List of Malaysian electoral districts#Pahang

== State level ==
=== State constituencies ===
- List of Malayan state and settlement electoral districts (1954–1959)#Pahang
- List of former Malaysian state electoral districts#Pahang

== By-Elections ==
=== State Assembly ===
- 2023
1. Pelangai
- 2022
1. Tioman
- 2020
1. Chini
- 2011
1. Kerdau
- 2007
1. Batu Talam
- 2002
1. Ketari
- 1993
1. Batu Talam
- 1989
1. Teruntum
- 1986
1. Bandar Maran
- 1983
1. Bandar Raub
- 1964
1. Jelai
- 1963
1. Pahang Tua

=== Dewan Rakyat ===
- 2019
1. Cameron Highlands
- 2015
1. Rompin
- 1997
1. Lipis
- 1989
1. Bentong
- 1976
1. Pekan
- 1968
1. Kuantan
- 1967
1. Raub
- 1962
1. Lipis
