= Elections in Perlis =

Elections in Malaysian state

Elections in Perlis have been held in the Malaysian state of Perlis since 1955 and have chosen Perlis's elected representatives in the Dewan Rakyat and Dewan Undangan Negeri (the Malaysian federal and state assemblies).

== Federal level ==
=== Federal constituencies ===
- List of Malayan federal electoral districts (1955–1959)#Perlis
- List of former Malaysian federal electoral districts#Perlis
- List of Malaysian electoral districts#Perlis

== State level ==
=== State constituencies ===
- List of Malayan state and settlement electoral districts (1954–1959)#Perlis
- List of former Malaysian state electoral districts#Perlis

== By-Elections ==
=== State Assembly ===
- 2002
1. Indera Kayangan
- 2000
1. Sanggang
- 1978
1. Titi Tinggi
- 1974
1. Bandar Kangar

=== Dewan Rakyat ===
- 1998
1. Arau
