= Elections in Perak =

Elections in Perak have been held in the Malaysian state of Perak since 1955 and have chosen Perak's elected representatives in the Dewan Rakyat and Dewan Undangan Negeri (the Malaysian federal and state assemblies).

== Federal level ==
=== Federal constituencies ===
- List of Malayan federal electoral districts (1955–1959)#Perak
- List of former Malaysian federal electoral districts#Perak
- List of Malaysian electoral districts#Perak

== State level ==
=== State constituencies ===
- List of Malayan state and settlement electoral districts (1954–1959)#Perak
- List of former Malaysian state electoral districts#Perak

== By-Elections ==
=== State Assembly ===
- 2025
1. Ayer Kuning
- 2020
1. Slim
- 1997
1. Changkat Jering
- 1983
1. Kenering
2. Rungkup
- 1982
1. Kepayang
- 1977
1. Kenering
- 1974
1. Alor Pongsu
- 1960
1. Grik
- 1957
1. Larut South-Matang

=== Dewan Rakyat ===
- 2016
1. Kuala Kangsar
- 2014
1. Telok Intan
- 2009
1. Bukit Gantang
- 1997
1. Telok Intan
- 1987
1. Gopeng
- 1966
1. Krian Laut
2. Bruas
- 1961
1. Telok Anson
- 1960
1. Kampar
- 1957
1. Sungai Perak Ulu
2. Ipoh-Menglembu
