= Elections in Selangor =

Elections in Selangor have been held in the Malaysian state of Selangor since 1954 and have chosen Selangor's elected representatives in the Dewan Rakyat and Dewan Undangan Negeri (the Malaysian federal and state assemblies).

== Federal level ==
=== Federal constituencies ===
- List of Malayan federal electoral districts (1955–1959)#Selangor
- List of former Malaysian federal electoral districts § Selangor
- List of Malaysian electoral districts § Selangor

== State level ==
=== State constituencies ===
- List of Malayan state and settlement electoral districts (1954–1959)#Selangor
- List of former Malaysian state electoral districts § Selangor

== By-Elections ==
=== State Assembly ===
- 2024
1. Kuala Kubu Baharu
- 2019
1. Semenyih
- 2018
1. Sungai Kandis
2. Balakong
3. Seri Setia
- 2014
1. Kajang
- 2007
1. Ijok
- 1997
1. Permatang
- 1994
1. Sementa
2. Shahbandar Raya
- 1989
1. Sungai Besar
- 1978
1. Morib
2. Kampong Jawa
- 1973
1. Kajang
- 1968
1. Serdang
- 1967
1. Kampong Bharu
- 1963
1. Port Swettenham
2. Teloh Datoh

=== Dewan Rakyat ===
- 2016
1. Sungai Besar
- 2010
1. Hulu Selangor
- 1997
1. Kuala Selangor
- 1989
1. Ampang Jaya
- 1979
1. Pelabuhan Kelang
- 1975
1. Selayang
- 1972
1. Ulu Selangor
- 1971
1. Kapar
