= Elections in Kuala Lumpur =

Kuala Lumpur elections

Elections in Kuala Lumpur have been held in the Malaysian federal territory of Kuala Lumpur since 1974 and have chosen Kuala Lumpur's elected representatives in the Dewan Rakyat.

== Federal constituencies ==
- List of Malayan federal electoral districts (1955–1959)#Selangor
- List of former Malaysian federal electoral districts#Selangor
- List of former Malaysian federal electoral districts#Federal Territories
- List of Malaysian electoral districts#Federal Territory of Kuala Lumpur
