= List of former Malaysian federal electoral districts =

This is a list of the Malaysian federal electoral districts used since 1955 (Trengganu and Johore since 1954).

== Perlis ==
Parliamentary constituency	1955–59*	1959–1974	1974–1986	1986–1995	1995–2004	2004–2018	2018–present
Arau			■■■■■■	■■■■■■■	■■■■■	■■■■■	■■■■■
Kangar			■■■■■■	■■■■■■■	■■■■■	■■■■■	■■■■■
Padang Besar					■■■■■	■■■■■	■■■■■
Perlis	■■■■■ ■■■■						
Perlis Selatan		■■■■■■					
Perlis Utara		■■■■■■					

== Kedah ==
Parliamentary constituency	1955–59*	1959–1974	1974–1986	1986–1995	1995–2004	2004–2018	2018–present
Alor Setar							■■■
Alor Star	■■	■■	■■	■■	■■■	■■■	
Baling		■■	■■	■■	■■	■■■	■■■
Jerai		■■	■■	■■		■■■	■■■
Jerlun					■■	■■	■■
Jerlun-Langkawi			■■	■■			
Jitra-Padang Terap		■■					
Kedah Selatan	■■						
Kedah Tengah	■■	■■					
Kedah Utara	■■						
Kota Star	■■		■■	■■			
Kota Star Selatan		■■					
Kota Star Utara		■■					
Kuala Kedah		■■	■■	■■	■■■	■■■	■■■
Kuala Muda			■■				
Kubang Pasu			■■	■■	■■	■■	■■
Kubang Pasu Barat		■■					
Kulim Utara		■■					
Kulim-Bandar Baharu				■■	■■	■■	■■
Kulim-Bandar Bahru		■■	■■				
Langkawi					■■	■■	■■
Merbok				■■	■■■	■■■	■■■
Padang Serai			■■	■■	■■■	■■	■■
Padang Terap			■■	■■	■■	■■	■■
Pendang				■■	■■	■■	■■
Pokok Sena					■■■	■■■	■■■
Sik				■■	■■	■■	■■
Sungai Petani				■■	■■■	■■■	■■■
Sungei Muda	■■						
Sungei Patani		■■	■■				
Ulu Muda			■■				
Yan					■■		

== Kelantan ==
Parliamentary constituency	1955–59*	1959–1974	1974–1986	1986–1995	1995–2004	2004–2018	2018–present
Bachok		■■■	■■■	■■■	■■■	■■■	■■■
Gua Musang				■■■	■■■	■■■	■■■
Jeli					■■■	■■■	■■■
Kelantan Hilir		■■■					
Kelantan Selatan	■■■						
Kelantan Tengah	■■■						
Kelantan Timor	■■■■						
Kelantan Utara	■■■						
Ketereh						■■■	■■■
Kok Lanas				■■■			
Kota Bharu			■■■	■■■	■■■	■■■	■■■
Kota Bharu Hilir		■■■					
Kota Bharu Hulu		■■■					
Kuala Krai			■■■	■■■	■■■	■■■■	■■■■
Kubang Kerian					■■■	■■■	■■■
Machang			■■■	■■■	■■■	■■■	■■■
Nilam Puri			■■■	■■■			
Pasir Mas	■■■		■■■	■■■	■■■	■■■	■■■
Pasir Mas Hilir		■■■					
Pasir Mas Hulu		■■■					
Pasir Puteh		■■■	■■■	■■■	■■■■	■■■■	■■■■
Pengkalan Chepa			■■■	■■■	■■■	■■■	■■■
Peringat					■■■		
Rantau Panjang			■■■	■■■	■■■	■■■	■■■
Tanah Merah		■■■	■■■	■■■	■■■	■■■	■■■
Tumpat		■■■	■■■	■■■	■■■	■■■■	■■■■
Ulu Kelantan		■■■	■■■				

== Terengganu ==
Formerly spelled as Trengganu

Parliamentary constituency	1954–59*	1959–1974	1974–1986	1986–1995	1995–2004	2004–2018	2018–present
Besut		■■■■■	■■■■	■■■■	■■■■	■■■■	■■■■
Dungun		■■■	■■■■	■■■■	■■■■	■■■■	■■■■
Hulu Terengganu				■■■■	■■■■	■■■■	■■■■
Kemaman		■■■■	■■■■	■■■■	■■■■	■■■■	■■■■
Kuala Nerus			■■■■	■■■■	■■■■	■■■■	■■■■
Kuala Terengganu				■■■■	■■■■	■■■■	■■■■
Kuala Trengganu			■■■■				
Kuala Trengganu Selatan		■■■■					
Kuala Trengganu Utara		■■■■					
Marang				■■■■	■■■■	■■■■	■■■■
Setiu				■■■■	■■■■	■■■■	■■■■
Trengganu Selatan	■■■■■						
Trengganu Tengah	■■■■■	■■■■					
Trengganu Utara	■■■■■						
Ulu Nerus			■■■■				
Ulu Trengganu			■■■■				

== Penang ==
Formerly known as Penang Settlement

Parliamentary constituency	1955–59*	1959–1974	1974–1986	1986–1995	1995–2004	2004–2018	2018–present
Bagan		■■		■■■	■■■	■■■	■■■
Balik Pulau			■■■	■■■	■■■	■■■	■■■
Batu Kawan						■■■	■■■
Bayan Baru				■■■	■■■	■■■	■■■
Bukit Bendera			■■■	■■■	■■■	■■■■	■■■■
Bukit Gelugor						■■■	■■■
Bukit Mertajam			■■■	■■■	■■■	■■■	■■■
Dato Kramat		■■■					
George Town	■■■■						
Jelutong			■■■	■■■	■■■	■■■	■■■
Kepala Batas			■■■	■■■	■■■	■■■	■■■
Mata Kuching			■■■				
Nibong Tebal			■■■	■■■	■■■	■■■	■■■
Penang Island	■■■■						
Penang Selatan		■■■■					
Penang Utara		■■■■					
Permatang Pauh			■■■	■■■	■■■	■■■	■■■
Seberang Selatan		■■					
Seberang Tengah		■■■					
Seberang Utara		■■■					
Tanjong		■■■	■■■	■■■	■■■	■■■	■■■
Tasek Gelugor				■■■	■■■	■■■	■■■
Wellesley North	■■■						
Wellesley South	■■■						

== Perak ==
Parliamentary constituency	1955–59*	1959–1974	1974–1986	1986–1995	1995–2004	2004–2018	2018–present
Bagan Datok		■■	■■	■■	■■	■■	
Bagan Datuk							■■
Bagan Serai			■■	■■	■■	■■■	■■■
Batang Padang	■■	■■	■■				
Batu Gajah		■■	■■	■■	■■	■■■	■■■
Beruas				■■	■■	■■	■■■
Bruas		■■	■■				
Bukit Gantang				■■	■■■	■■■	■■■
Chenderoh					■■		
Dindings	■■						
Gerik			■■	■■	■■■	■■	■■
Gopeng				■■	■■	■■■	■■■
Hilir Perak		■■	■■				
Ipoh		■■	■■	■■			
Ipoh-Menglembu	■■						
Ipoh Barat					■■	■■■	■■■
Ipoh Timor					■■■	■■■	■■■
Kampar		■■		■■	■■■	■■■	■■■
Kinta			■■				
Kinta Selatan	■■						
Kinta Utara	■■						
Krian	■■						
Krian Darat		■■					
Krian Laut		■■					
Kuala Kangsar		■■	■■	■■	■■	■■	■■
Larut			■■	■■	■■	■■■	■■■
Larut-Matang	■■						
Larut Selatan		■■					
Larut Utara		■■					
Lenggong						■■	■■
Lumut			■■	■■	■■■	■■■	■■
Matang			■■				
Menglembu		■■	■■				
Padang Rengas			■■			■■	■■
Parit		■■	■■	■■	■■	■■	■■
Parit Buntar			■■	■■	■■	■■	■■
Pasir Pinji				■■			
Pasir Salak				■■	■■	■■	■■
Sitiawan		■■					
Sungai Siput				■■	■■	■■	■■
Sungei Perak Hilir	■■						
Sungei Perak Ulu	■■						
Sungei Siput		■■	■■				
Taiping			■■	■■	■■■	■■■	■■■
Tambun				■■	■■	■■	■■
Tanjong Malim		■■	■■	■■	■■	■■■	■■■
Tapah				■■	■■	■■	■■
Tasek Chenderoh				■■			
Telok Anson	■■	■■	■■				
Telok Intan				■■	■■	■■	
Teluk Intan							■■
Ulu Kinta		■■					
Ulu Perak		■■					

== Pahang ==
Parliamentary constituency	1955–59*	1959–1974	1974–1986	1986–1995	1995–2004	2004–2018	2018–present
Bentong		■■■■	■■■■	■■■	■■■■	■■■■	■■■■
Bera						■■■	■■■
Cameron Highlands						■■	■■
Indera Mahkota						■■	■■
Jerantut			■■■■	■■■	■■■	■■■	■■■
Kuala Krau						■■■	■■■
Kuantan		■■■■	■■■■	■■■	■■■	■■■	■■■
Lipis		■■■■	■■■■	■■■■	■■■■	■■■	■■■
Maran			■■■■	■■■■	■■■■	■■■	■■■
Mentakab				■■■	■■■		
Pahang Timor	■■■						
Paya Besar					■■■	■■	■■
Pekan		■■■	■■■■	■■■	■■■	■■■■	■■■■
Raub		■■■■	■■■■	■■■■	■■■■	■■■	■■■
Rompin				■■■	■■■	■■■	■■■
Semantan	■■■						
Temerloh		■■■■■	■■■■	■■■	■■■■	■■■	■■■
Ulu Pahang	■■■						

== Selangor ==
Parliamentary constituency	1955–59*	1959–1974	1974–1986	1986–1995	1995–2004	2004–2018	2018–present
Ampang						■■	■■
Ampang Jaya				■■■	■■■		
Bangi							■■■
Batu		■■					
Bukit Bintang		■■					
Bangsar		■■					
Damansara		■■					■■■
Gombak					■■■	■■■	■■■
Hulu Langat				■■■	■■■	■■■	■■
Hulu Selangor				■■■	■■■	■■■	■■■
Kapar		■■		■■■	■■■	■■■■	■■■
Kelana Jaya						■■	
Klang		■■		■■■	■■	■■■	■■■
Kota Raja						■■	■■■
Kuala Langat		■■	■■■	■■■	■■■	■■■	■■■
Kuala Lumpur Barat	■■						
Kuala Lumpur Timor	■■						
Kuala Selangor	■■	■■	■■■	■■■	■■■	■■■	■■■
Langat	■■	■■					
Pandan						■■	■■
Pelabuhan Kelang			■■■				
Petaling			■■■				
Petaling Jaya				■■■			■■■
Petaling Jaya Selatan					■■	■■	
Petaling Jaya Utara					■■	■■	
Puchong				■■■		■■	■■
Rawang		■■					
Sabak Bernam		■■	■■■	■■■	■■■	■■	■■
Selangor Barat	■■						
Selangor Tengah	■■						
Selayang			■■■	■■■	■■■	■■■	■■■
Sepang		■■	■■■	■■■	■■■	■■■	■■■
Serdang					■■■	■■■	
Setapak		■■					
Shah Alam			■■■	■■■	■■■	■■	■■
Subang					■■■	■■■	■■
Sungai Besar						■■	■■
Sungai Buloh							■■
Tanjong Karang			■■■	■■■	■■■	■■	■■
Ulu Langat			■■■				
Ulu Selangor	■	■■	■■■				

== Federal Territories ==
Parliamentary constituency	1974–1986	1986–1995	1995–2004	2004–2018	2018–present
Bandar Tun Razak			♦		
Batu		♦			
Bukit Bintang		♦			
Cheras			♦		
Damansara	♦				
Kepong	♦				
Kuala Lumpur Bandar	♦				
Labuan		♦			
Lembah Pantai		♦			
Putrajaya				♦	
Segambut			♦		
Seputeh		♦			
Setapak	♦				
Setiawangsa				♦	
Sungai Besi		♦			
Sungei Besi	♦				
Titiwangsa		♦			
Wangsa Maju			♦		

== Negeri Sembilan ==
Formerly spelled as Negri Sembilan

Parliamentary constituency	1955–59*	1959–1974	1974–1986	1986–1995	1995–2004	2004–2018	2018–present
Jelebu			■■■■	■■■■	■■■■	■■■■	■■■■
Jelebu-Jempol		■■■■■					
Jempol				■■■■	■■■■	■■■■	■■■■
Kuala Pilah		■■■■	■■■■	■■■■	■■■■■	■■■■■	■■■■■
Mantin			■■■■				
Negri Sembilan Selatan	■■■■						
Negri Sembilan Utara	■■■■						
Port Dickson		■■■■■					■■■■■
Rasah				■■■■	■■■■■	■■■■■	■■■■■
Rembau						■■■■	■■■■
Rembau-Tampin		■■■■					
Seremban	■■■■		■■■■	■■■■	■■■■■	■■■■■■	■■■■■■
Seremban Barat		■■■					
Seremban Timor		■■■					
Tampin			■■■■	■■■■	■■■■	■■■	■■■
Telok Kemang			■■■■	■■■■	■■■■■	■■■■■	

== Malacca ==
Formerly known as Malacca Settlement

Parliamentary constituency	1955–59*	1959–1974	1974–1986	1986–1995	1995–2004	2004–2018	2018–present
Alor Gajah			■■■■■	■■■■	■■■■■	■■■■■	■■■■■
Bandar Malacca		■■■■■					
Batu Berendam			■■■■■	■■■■	■■■■■		
Bukit Katil						■■■■	
Hang Tuah Jaya							■■■■
Jasin			■■■■■	■■■■	■■■■■	■■■■■	■■■■■
Kota Melaka			■■■■■	■■■■	■■■■■	■■■■■	■■■■■
Malacca Central	■■■■						
Malacca Luar	■■■■						
Malacca Selatan		■■■■■					
Malacca Tengah		■■■■■					
Malacca Utara		■■■■■					
Masjid Tanah						■■■■■	■■■■■
Selandar				■■■■	■■■■■		
Tangga Batu						■■■■	■■■■

== Johor ==
Formerly spelled as Johore

Parliamentary constituency	1954–59*	1959–1974	1974–1986	1986–1995	1995–2004	2004–2018	2018–present
Ayer Hitam			■■			■■	■■
Bakri				■■	■■	■■■	■■■
Batu Pahat	■■	■■	■■	■■	■■	■■■	■■■
Batu Pahat Dalam		■■					
Gelang Patah					■■	■■	
Iskandar Puteri							■■
Johor Bahru				■■	■■	■■	■■
Johore Bahru	■■		■■				
Johore Bahru Barat		■■					
Johore Bahru Timor		■■					
Johore Selatan	■■						
Johore Tengah	■■						
Johore Tenggara		■■					
Johore Timor	■■	■■					
Kluang			■■	■■	■■	■■	■■
Kluang Selatan		■■					
Kluang Utara		■■					
Kota Tinggi				■■	■■	■■	■■
Kulai						■■■	■■■
Labis			■■	■■	■■	■■	■■
Ledang			■■	■■	■■	■■■	■■■
Mersing				■■	■■	■■	■■
Muar			■■	■■	■■	■■	■■
Muar Dalam		■■					
Muar Pantai		■■					
Muar Selatan	■■	■■					
Muar Utara	■■	■■					
Pagoh			■■	■■	■■	■■	■■
Panti			■■				
Parit Sulong				■■	■■	■■	■■
Pasir Gudang						■■	■■
Pengerang						■■	■■
Pontian			■■	■■	■■	■■	■■
Pontian Selatan		■■					
Pontian Utara		■■					
Pulai			■■	■■	■■	■■	■■
Renggam			■■				
Segamat	■■		■■	■■	■■	■■	■■
Segamat Selatan		■■					
Segamat Utara		■■					
Sekijang						■■	■■
Sembrong						■■	■■
Semerah			■■				
Senai				■■	■■		
Simpang Renggam						■■	■■
Sri Gading			■■	■■	■■	■■	■■
Sungai Benut				■■	■■		
Tanjong Piai						■■	
Tanjung Piai							■■
Tebrau				■■	■■	■■	■■
Tenggara					■■	■■	■■
Tenggaroh			■■				

== Sabah ==
Parliamentary constituency	1967–1974	1974–1986	1986–1995	1995–2004	2004–2019	2019–present
Bandau	■■	■■■	■■■	■■		
Batu Sapi					■■	■■
Beaufort				■■■	■■	■■
Beluran				■■	■■	■■
Darvel	■■					
Gaya		■■■	■■	■■		
Hilir Padas		■■■				
Jambongan			■■■			
Kalabakan					■■■	■■■
Keningau		■■■	■■	■■■	■■■	■■■
Kimanis	■■	■■■	■■		■■	■■
Kinabalu	■■	■■■	■■	■■		
Kinabatangan	■■	■■■	■■■	■■	■■	■■
Kota Belud	■■	■■■	■■■	■■■	■■■	■■■
Kota Kinabalu	■■				■■■	■■■
Kota Marudu					■■	■■
Kudat					■■■	■■■
Labuan-Beaufort	■■					
Labuk-Sugut	■■	■■■				
Lahad Datu						■■■
Libaran				■■	■■	■■
Limbawang			■■			
Marudu	■■	■■■	■■■	■■■		
Padas			■■■			
Papar			■■	■■	■■	■■
Penampang	■■	■■■	■■	■■	■■	■■
Pensiangan			■■		■■	■■
Putatan					■■	■■
Ranau					■■■	■■■
Sabah Dalam	■■					
Sabah Selatan	■■					
Sandakan	■■	■■■	■■■	■■■	■■	■■
Semporna			■■	■■■	■■■	■■■
Sepanggar					■■	■■
Silam		■■■	■■	■■	■■■	
Sipitang				■■	■■	■■
Tanjong Aru			■■	■■		
Tawau	■■	■■■	■■	■■■	■■■	■■■
Tenom				■■	■■	■■
Tuaran	■■	■■■	■■■	■■■	■■■	■■■
Ulu Padas		■■■				

== Sarawak ==
Parliamentary constituency	1969–1978	1978–1990	1990–1999	1999–2008	2008–2016	2016−present
Bandar Kuching	■■	■■	■■■	■■	■■	■■■
Bandar Sibu	■■					
Baram	■■	■■	■■	■■	■■	■■■
Batang Lupar	■■	■■	■■	■■	■■■	■■■
Batang Sadong			■■	■■	■■	■■■
Bau-Lundu	■■					
Betong	■■	■■	■■	■■	■■■	■■■
Bintulu	■■	■■	■■	■■■	■■■	■■■
Bukit Mas		■■	■■	■■■		
Hulu Rajang			■■	■■	■■	■■■
Igan					■■	■■
Julau	■■	■■	■■	■■	■■	■■
Kanowit	■■	■■	■■	■■	■■	■■
Kapit	■■	■■	■■	■■	■■	■■■
Kota Samarahan			■■	■■	■■	■■■
Kuala Rajang			■■■	■■■		
Lambir		■■				
Lanang			■■	■■	■■	■■
Lawas					■■	■■
Limbang					■■	■■
Limbang-Lawas	■■					
Lubok Antu	■■	■■	■■	■■	■■	■■
Mambong				■■	■■	
Mas Gading		■■	■■	■■	■■	■■
Miri			■■	■■■	■■■	■■■
Miri-Subis	■■					
Mukah	■■	■■	■■	■■	■■	■■■
Padawan	■■	■■	■■			
Paloh		■■				
Payang	■■					
Petra Jaya			■■	■■■	■■■	■■■
Puncak Borneo						■■■
Rajang	■■	■■				
Samarahan	■■	■■				
Santubong	■■	■■	■■	■■	■■■	■■■
Saratok	■■	■■	■■	■■	■■	■■■
Sarikei	■■	■■	■■	■■	■■	■■
Selangau			■■	■■	■■	■■
Serian	■■	■■	■■	■■	■■	■■■
Sibu		■■	■■	■■■	■■■	■■■
Sibuti					■■	■■
Simunjan	■■	■■				
Sri Aman			■■	■■	■■■	■■■
Stampin				■■	■■■	■■■
Tanjong Manis					■■	■■
Ulu Rajang	■■	■■				
