= List of Selangor Legislative Assemblies =

Selangor Legislature
- 14th Selangor State Assembly

Type
- Type: Unicameral
- Houses: Selangor State Legislative Assembly

History
- Founded: July 8, 1959
- Preceded by: Majlis Mesyuarat Negeri

Meeting place
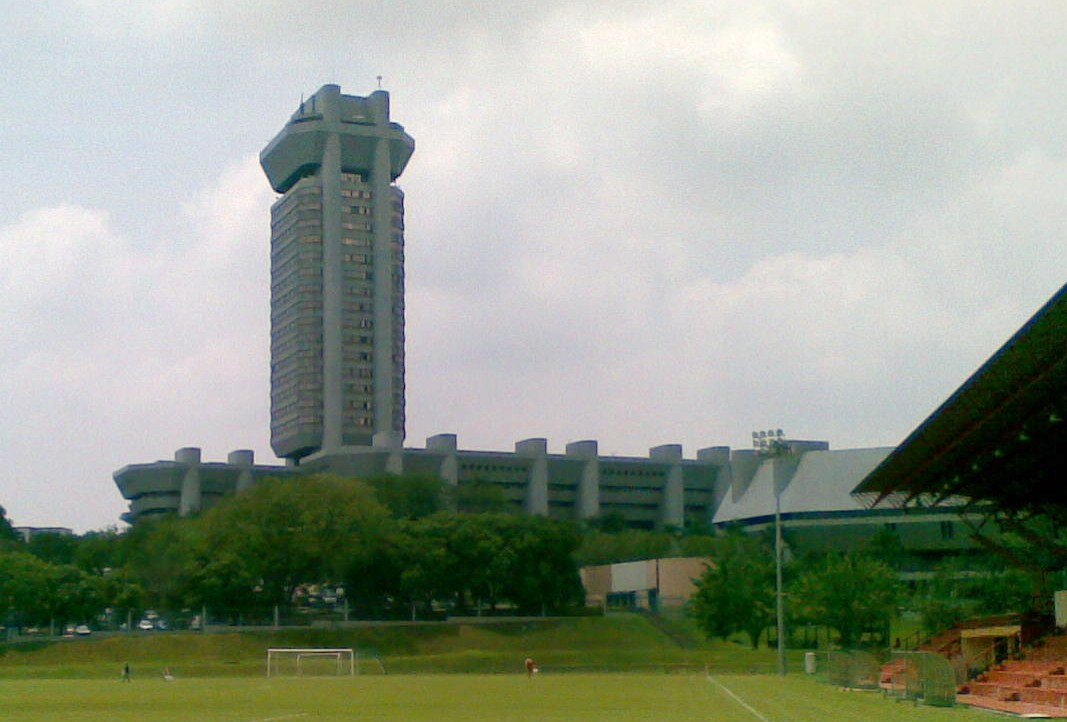
- Bangunan Sultan Salahuddin Abdul Aziz Shah, Shah Alam, Selangor

The Legislature of Selangor is the legislature of the state of Selangor, Malaysia. The legislature is made up of two elements: the Sultan of Selangor and the unicameral Selangor State Legislative Assembly. The legislature has existed since Selangor became a state in Malaysia, after the first ever general election in 1959.

Like the Malaysian federal government, Selangor uses the Westminster-style parliamentary government, in which members are sent to the Legislative Assembly after state elections and the Sultan appoints the person who can command a majority of the members of the Assembly, typically the leader of the party with the most seats, as Menteri Besar of Selangor. The Menteri Besar then recommends the appointment of the Selangor State Executive Council. The Menteri Besar is the head of government, while the Sultan is the head of state.

== List of Legislature ==
Following is the list of the 14 times the legislature has been convened since 1959.

- 1st Selangor State Assembly
- 2nd Selangor State Assembly
- 3rd Selangor State Assembly
- 4th Selangor State Assembly
- 5th Selangor State Assembly
- 6th Selangor State Assembly
- 7th Selangor State Assembly
- 8th Selangor State Assembly
- 9th Selangor State Assembly
- 10th Selangor State Assembly
- 11th Selangor State Assembly
- 12th Selangor State Assembly
- 13th Selangor State Assembly
- 14th Selangor State Assembly

== See also ==
List of Malayan State and Settlement Council Representatives (1954–59)#Selangor
