= Kurong Anai (state constituency) =

Perlis constituency

Defunct state constituency
- Legislature: Perlis State Legislative Assembly
- Constituency created: 1958
- Constituency abolished: 1995
- First contested: 1959
- Last contested: 1990

Kurong Anai was a state constituency in Perlis, Malaysia, that was represented in the Perlis State Legislative Assembly from 1959 to 1995.

The state constituency was created in the 1958 redistribution and was mandated to return a single member to the Perlis State Legislative Assembly under the first past the post voting system.

== History ==
It was abolished in 1995 when it was redistributed.

=== Representation history ===
Members of the Legislative Assembly for Kurong Anai
Assembly	No	Years	Member	Party
Constituency created
1st	N07	1959-1964	Mokhtar Ismail	Alliance (UMNO)
2nd	N07	1964-1969	Wan Ahmad Wan Abdullah	Alliance (UMNO)
		1969-1971	Assembly dissolved	
3rd	N07	1971-1973	Wan Ahmad Wan Abdullah	Alliance (UMNO)
3rd	N07	1973-1974	Wan Ahmad Wan Abdullah	BN (UMNO)
4th	N11	1974-1978	Wan Ahmad Wan Abdullah	BN (UMNO)
5th	N11	1978-1982	Abu Bakar Ahmad	BN (UMNO)
6th	N11	1982-1986	Abu Bakar Ahmad	BN (UMNO)
7th	N13	1986-1990	Tengku Aziz Tengku Jaafar	BN (UMNO)
8th	N13	1990-1995	Tengku Aziz Tengku Jaafar	BN (UMNO)
Constituency abolished, renamed to Guar Sanji

== Election results ==
Perlis state election, 1990
Party	Candidate	Votes	%	∆%
BN	Tengku Aziz Tengku Jaafar	2,143	52.55	▲1.41
PAS	Hashim Jasin	1,935	47.45	▼1.41
Total rejected ballots		110		
Unreturned ballots		2		
Turnout		4,190	80.33	▲3.41
Registered electors		5,216		
Majority		208	5.10	▲2.82
BN hold		Swing		

Perlis state election, 1986
Party	Candidate	Votes	%	∆%
BN	Tengku Aziz Tengku Jaafar	1,660	51.14	▼7.18
PAS	Halim Ismail	1,586	48.86	▲10.59
Total valid votes		3,246	100.00	
Total rejected ballots		143		
Unreturned ballots		0		
Turnout		3,389	76.92	▼1.03
Registered electors		4,406		
Majority		74	2.28	▼17.76
BN hold		Swing		

Perlis state election, 1982
Party	Candidate	Votes	%	∆%
BN	Abu Bakar Ahmad	2,927	58.32	▲2.23
PAS	Halim @ Omar Ismail	1,921	38.27	▼5.64
Independent	Jusoh Man	171	3.41	▲3.41
Total valid votes		5,019	100.00	
Total rejected ballots		106		
Unreturned ballots		0		
Turnout		5,125	77.95	▲1.07
Registered electors		6,575		
Majority		1,006	20.04	▲7.85
BN hold		Swing		

Perlis state election, 1978
Party	Candidate	Votes	%	∆%
BN	Abu Bakar Ahmad	2,398	56.09	▼2.50
PAS	Ahmad Salleh	1,877	43.91	▲43.91
Total valid votes		4,275	100.00	
Total rejected ballots		283		
Unreturned ballots		0		
Turnout		4,558	76.88	▲3.72
Registered electors		5,929		
Majority		521	12.19	▼4.99
BN hold		Swing		{{{2}}}

Perlis state election, 1974
Party	Candidate	Votes	%	∆%
BN	Wan Ahmad Wan Abdullah	2,053	58.59	▲6.07
Parti Sosialis Rakyat Malaysia	Aishah Salleh	1,451	41.41	▲37.47
Total valid votes		3,504	100.00	
Total rejected ballots		475		
Unreturned ballots		0		
Turnout		3,979	73.16	▼4.29
Registered electors		5,439		
Majority		602	17.18	▲8.20
BN gain from Alliance		Swing		?

Perlis state election, 1969
Party	Candidate	Votes	%	∆%
Alliance	Wan Ahmad Wan Abdullah	1,824	52.52	▲6.07
PMIP	Saleh Che Mat	1,512	43.54	▲43.54
Parti Sosialis Rakyat Malaysia	Omar Ismail	137	3.94	▲3.94
Total valid votes		3,473	100.00	
Total rejected ballots		322		
Unreturned ballots		0		
Turnout		3,795	77.45	▲0.57
Registered electors		4,900		
Majority		312	8.98	▼13.97
Alliance hold		Swing		{{{2}}}

Perlis state election, 1964
Party	Candidate	Votes	%	∆%
Alliance	Wan Ahmad Wan Abdullah	1,733	61.48	▼1.23
PMIP	Ahmad Salleh	1,086	38.52	▲1.23
Total valid votes		2,819	100.00	
Total rejected ballots		194		
Unreturned ballots		0		
Turnout		3,013	76.88	▼2.03
Registered electors		3,919		
Majority		647	22.95	▼2.47
Alliance hold		Swing		{{{2}}}

Perlis state election, 1959
Party	Candidate	Votes	%
Alliance	Mokhtar Ismail	1,495	62.71
PMIP	Ibrahim Yasin	889	37.29
Total valid votes		2,384	100.00
Total rejected ballots		74	
Unreturned ballots		0	
Turnout		2,458	78.91
Registered electors		3,115	
Majority		606	25.42
This was a new constituency created.
