= Oran (state constituency) =

Perlis constituency

Defunct state constituency
- Legislature: Perlis State Legislative Assembly
- Constituency created: 1974
- Constituency abolished: 1995
- First contested: 1974
- Last contested: 1990

Oran was a state constituency in Perlis, Malaysia, that was represented in the Perlis State Legislative Assembly from 1974 to 1995.

The state constituency was created in the 1974 redistribution and was mandated to return a single member to the Perlis State Legislative Assembly under the first past the post voting system. Its last election was in 1990. It disappeared in the 1995 election.

== History ==
It was abolished in 1995 after it was redistributed.

=== Representation history ===
Members of the Legislative Assembly for Oran
Assembly	No	Years	Member	Party
Constituency created from Mata Ayer, Kurong Anai and Sena
4th	N06	1974–1978	Abdullah Hassan	BN (UMNO)
5th	N06	1978–1982	Ali Ahmad	BN (UMNO)
6th	N06	1982–1986	Ali Ahmad	BN (UMNO)
7th	N03	1986–1990	Yazid Mat	BN (UMNO)
8th	N03	1990–1995	Yazid Mat	BN (UMNO)
Constituency abolished, split into Mata Ayer and Chuping

== Election results ==
Perlis state election, 1990
Party	Candidate	Votes	%	∆%
BN	Yazid Mat	4,568	71.05	▼2.58
PAS	Ismail Mohamad	1,861	28.95	▲2.58
Total valid votes		6,429	100.00	
Total rejected ballots		280		
Unreturned ballots		65		
Turnout		6,774	81.82	▲2.63
Registered electors		8,279		
Majority		2,707	42.11	▼5.16
BN hold		Swing		{{{2}}}

Perlis state election, 1986
Party	Candidate	Votes	%	∆%
BN	Yazid Mat	3,700	73.63	▼0.35
PAS	Bakar Ismail	1,325	26.37	▲0.35
Total valid votes		5,025	100.00	
Total rejected ballots		235		
Unreturned ballots		0		
Turnout		5,260	79.19	▼1.60
Registered electors		6,642		
Majority		2,375	47.26	▼0.71
BN hold		Swing		{{{2}}}

Perlis state election, 1982
Party	Candidate	Votes	%	∆%
BN	Ali Ahmad	3,026	73.99	
PAS	Abu Bakar Ismail	1,064	26.01	
Total valid votes		4,090	100.00	
Total rejected ballots		116		
Unreturned ballots		0		
Turnout		4,206	80.79	
Registered electors		5,206		
Majority		1,962	47.97	
BN hold		Swing		{{{2}}}

Perlis state election, 1978
Party	Candidate	Votes	%	∆%
On the nomination day, Ali Ahmad won uncontested.
BN	Ali Ahmad			
Total valid votes			100.00	
Total rejected ballots				
Unreturned ballots				
Turnout				
Registered electors				
Majority				
BN hold		Swing		{{{2}}}

Perlis state election, 1974
Party	Candidate	Votes	%
BN	Abdullah Hassan	1,418	58.26
Independent	Osman Mat	962	39.52
Independent	Hussin @ Bakar Tin	35	1.44
Parti Sosialis Rakyat Malaysia	Amin Ishak Hussein	19	0.78
Total valid votes		2,434	100.00
Total rejected ballots		154	
Unreturned ballots		0	
Turnout		2,588	75.78
Registered electors		3,415	
Majority		456	
This was a new constituency created.
