= Sabah Selatan =

Federal constituency in Sabah, Malaysia

Sabah constituency

Defunct federal constituency
- Legislature: Dewan Rakyat
- Constituency created: 1966
- Constituency abolished: 1974
- First contested: 1969
- Last contested: 1969

Sabah Selatan was a federal constituency in Sabah, Malaysia, that was represented in the Dewan Rakyat from 1971 to 1974.

The federal constituency was created in the 1966 redistribution and was mandated to return a single member to the Dewan Rakyat under the first past the post voting system.

== History ==
It was abolished in 1974 when it was redistributed.

=== Representation history ===
Members of Parliament for Sabah Selatan
Parliament	No	Years	Member	Party	Vote Share
Constituency created
		1969-1971	Parliament was suspended		
3rd	P114	1971-1973	Abdul Rashid Jais (عبدالرشيد جاءيس)	USNO	Uncontested
3rd	P114	1973-1974	Abdul Rashid Jais (عبدالرشيد جاءيس)	BN (USNO)	Uncontested
Constituency abolished, renamed to Ulu Padas

=== State constituency ===
Parliamentary constituency	State constituency					
Parliamentary constituency	1967–1974	1974–1985	1985–1995	1995–2004	2004–2020	2020–present
Sabah Selatan	Sipitang-Ulu Padas					
Sabah Selatan	Tenom					

=== Historical boundaries ===
State Constituency	Area
State Constituency	1966
Sipitang-Ulu Padas	Kemabong; Long Pasia; Mesapol; Sindumin; Sipitang
Tenom	Mansasoh; Melalap; Mentalik; Sumandalom; Tenom

== Election results ==
Malaysian general election, 1969: Sabah Selatan
Party	Candidate	Votes	%
On the nomination day, Abdul Rashid Jais won uncontested.
USNO	Abdul Rashid Jais		
Total valid votes			100.00
Total rejected ballots			
Unreturned ballots			
Turnout			
Registered electors		11,062	
Majority			
This was a new constituency created.
