= Limbang-Lawas =

Sarawak constituency

Defunct federal constituency
- Legislature: Dewan Rakyat
- Constituency created: 1968
- Constituency abolished: 1978
- First contested: 1969
- Last contested: 1974

Limbang-Lawas was a federal constituency in Sarawak, Malaysia, that was represented in the Dewan Rakyat from 1971 to 1978.

The federal constituency was created in the 1968 redistribution and was mandated to return a single member to the Dewan Rakyat under the first past the post voting system.

== History ==
It was abolished in 1978 when it was redistributed.

=== Representation history ===
Members of Parliament for Limbang-Lawas
Parliament	No	Years	Member	Party	Vote Share
Constituency created
		1969-1971	Parliament was suspended		
3rd	P144	1971-1974	Awang Bungsu Abdullah (اوڠ بوڠسو عبدالله)	SNAP	4,744; 53.52%
4th	P154	1974-1978	Racha Umong	BN (PBB)	5,875; 54.87%
Constituency abolished, renamed to Bukit Mas

=== State constituency ===
Parliamentary constituency	State constituency					
Parliamentary constituency	1969–1978	1978–1990	1990–1999	1999–2008	2008–2016	2016−present
Limbang-Lawas	Limbang					
Limbang-Lawas	Lawas					

=== Historical boundaries ===
State Constituency	Area
State Constituency	1968
Limbang	Ba'kelalan; Long Sukang; Merapok; Sundar; Terusan
Lawas	Batu Danau; Lubai; Nanga Medamit; Padanaruan; Sebukang

== Election results ==
Malaysian general election, 1974: Limbang-Lawas
Party	Candidate	Votes	%	∆%
BN	Racha Umong	5,875	54.87	▲54.87
SNAP	Awang Bungsu Abdullah	4,669	43.60	▼9.76
Independent	Hasbollah Majid	164	1.53	▲1.53
Total valid votes		10,708	100.00	
Total rejected ballots		462		
Unreturned ballots		0		
Turnout		11,170	82.45	▲0.35
Registered electors		13,548		
Majority		1,206	11.27	▼10.98
BN gain from SNAP		Swing		?

Malaysian general election, 1969: Limbang-Lawas
Party	Candidate	Votes	%
SNAP	Awang Bungsu Abdullah	4,744	53.52
PBB	Awang Baja Awang Besar	2,772	31.27
Independent	Ngang Bundan	1,348	15.21
Total valid votes		8,864	100.00
Total rejected ballots		630	
Unreturned ballots			
Turnout		9,494	82.10
Registered electors		11,564	
Majority		1,972	22.25
This was a new constituency created.
