= Sabah Dalam =

Federal constituency in Sabah, Malaysia

Sabah constituency

Defunct federal constituency
- Legislature: Dewan Rakyat
- Constituency created: 1966
- Constituency abolished: 1974
- First contested: 1969
- Last contested: 1969

Sabah Dalam was a federal constituency in Sabah, Malaysia, that was represented in the Dewan Rakyat from 1971 to 1974.

The federal constituency was created in the 1966 redistribution and was mandated to return a single member to the Dewan Rakyat under the first past the post voting system.

== History ==
It was abolished in 1974 when it was redistributed.

=== Representation history ===
Members of Parliament for Sabah Dalam
Parliament	No	Years	Member	Party	Vote Share
Constituency created
		1969-1971	Parliament was suspended		
3rd	P113	1971-1973	Mohamed Arif Salleh (محمد عارف صالح)	USNO	Uncontested
3rd	P113	1973-1974	Mohamed Arif Salleh (محمد عارف صالح)	BN (USNO)	Uncontested
Constituency abolished, renamed to Keningau

=== State constituency ===
Parliamentary constituency	State constituency					
Parliamentary constituency	1967–1974	1974–1985	1985–1995	1995–2004	2004–2020	2020–present
Sabah Dalam	Keningau					
Sabah Dalam	Pensiangan-Sook					

=== Historical boundaries ===
State Constituency	Area
State Constituency	1966
Keningau	Apin-Apin; Bandukan; Bingkor; Keningau; Liawan
Pensiangan-Sook	Nabawan; Pensiangan; Sepalut; Sook; Tulid

== Election results ==
Malaysian general election, 1969: Sabah Dalam
Party	Candidate	Votes	%
On the nomination day, Mohamed Arif Salleh won uncontested.
USNO	Mohamed Arif Salleh		
Total valid votes			100.00
Total rejected ballots			
Unreturned ballots			
Turnout			
Registered electors		12,889	
Majority			
This was a new constituency created.
