= Bau-Lundu =

Sarawak constituency

Defunct federal constituency
- Legislature: Dewan Rakyat
- Constituency created: 1968
- Constituency abolished: 1978
- First contested: 1969
- Last contested: 1974

Bau-Lundu was a federal constituency in Sarawak, Malaysia, that was represented in the Dewan Rakyat from 1971 to 1978.

The federal constituency was created in the 1968 redistribution and was mandated to return a single member to the Dewan Rakyat under the first past the post voting system.

== History ==
It was abolished in 1978 when it was redistributed.

=== Representation history ===
Members of Parliament for Bau-Lundu
Parliament	No	Years	Member	Party	Vote Share
Constituency created
		1969-1971	Parliament was suspended		
3rd	P121	1971	Sinyium Mutit	SUPP	4,539; 34.67%
3rd	P121	1971-1973	Joseph Valentine Cotter	SUPP	4,651; 52.93%
3rd	P121	1973-1974	Joseph Valentine Cotter	BN (SUPP)	4,651; 52.93%
4th	P131	1974-1978	Patrick Uren	SNAP	6,949; 50.67%
Constituency abolished, renamed to Mas Gading

=== State constituency ===
Parliamentary constituency	State constituency					
Parliamentary constituency	1969–1978	1978–1990	1990–1999	1999–2008	2008–2016	2016−present
Bau-Lundu	Bau					
Bau-Lundu	Lundu					

=== Historical boundaries ===
State Constituency	Area
State Constituency	1968
Bau	Bau; Kampung Peninjau; Serikin; Siniawan; Taitong
Lundu	Lundu; Semantan; Sungai Sampadi; Tanjung Datu; Teluk Melano

== Election results ==
Malaysian general election, 1974: Bau-Lundu
Party	Candidate	Votes	%	∆%
SNAP	Patrick Uren	6,949	50.67	▲8.43
BN	Joseph Valentine Cotter	6,766	49.33	▲49.33
Total valid votes		13,715	100.00	
Total rejected ballots		624		
Unreturned ballots		0		
Turnout		14,339	81.94	▼20.98
Registered electors		17,500		
Majority		183	1.34	▼9.35
SNAP gain from SUPP		Swing		?

Malaysian general by-election, 11–14 October 1971: Bau-Lundu Upon the resignation of incumbent, Sinyium Mutit
Party	Candidate	Votes	%	∆%
SUPP	Joseph Valentine Cotter	4,651	52.93	▲18.26
SNAP	Lee Ngan Chooi	3,712	42.24	▲13.72
Independent	Robert Jacob Ridu	424	4.83	▲4.83
Total valid votes		8,787	100.00	
Total rejected ballots		610		
Unreturned ballots				
Turnout		9,397	60.96	▼28.81
Registered electors		15,414		
Majority		939	10.69	▲4.54
SUPP hold		Swing		?

Malaysian general election, 1969: Bau-Lundu
Party	Candidate	Votes	%
SUPP	Sinyium Mutit	4,539	34.67
SNAP	Lee Nyen Choi	3,733	28.52
PBB	John Loyar Nyibai	2,655	20.28
PESAKA	Lawrence Kureng Nasif	2,164	16.53
Total valid votes		13,091	100.00
Total rejected ballots		753	
Unreturned ballots			
Turnout		13,844	89.77
Registered electors		15,424	
Majority		806	6.15
This was a new constituency created.
