= Darvel (federal constituency) =

Sabah constituency

Defunct federal constituency
- Legislature: Dewan Rakyat
- Constituency created: 1966
- Constituency abolished: 1974
- First contested: 1969
- Last contested: 1969

Darvel was a federal constituency in Sabah, Malaysia, that was represented in the Dewan Rakyat from 1971 to 1974.

The federal constituency was created in the 1966 redistribution and was mandated to return a single member to the Dewan Rakyat under the first past the post voting system.

== History ==
It was abolished in 1974 when it was redistributed.

=== Representation history ===
Members of Parliament for Darvel
| Parliament | No | Years | Member | Party | Vote Share |
Constituency created
| | | 1969-1971 | Parliament was suspended | | |
| 3rd | P119 | 1971-1973 | Mohd. Salleh Abdullah (محمد. صالح عبدالله) | USNO | Uncontested |
| 3rd | P119 | 1973-1974 | Mohd. Salleh Abdullah (محمد. صالح عبدالله) | BN (USNO) | Uncontested |
Constituency abolished, renamed into Silam

=== State constituency ===
| Parliamentary constituency | State constituency | | | | | |
| Parliamentary constituency | 1967–1974 | 1974–1985 | 1985–1995 | 1995–2004 | 2004–2020 | 2020–present |
|---|---|---|---|---|---|---|
| Darvel | Lahad Datu | | | | | |
| Darvel | Semporna | | | | | |

=== Historical boundaries ===
| State Constituency | Area |
| State Constituency | 1966 |
|---|---|
| Lahad Datu | Kunak; Lahad Datu; Silam; Tungku; Ulu Segama |
| Semporna | Bugaya; Pulau Bum-Bum; Pulau Timbun Mata; Semporna; Sulabayan |

== Election results ==
Malaysian general election, 1969
| Party | Candidate | Votes | % |
|---|---|---|---|
On the nomination day, Mohd. Salleh Abdullah won uncontested.
| USNO | Mohd. Salleh Abdullah | | |
| Total valid votes | | | 100.00 |
| Total rejected ballots | | | |
| Unreturned ballots | | | |
| Turnout | | | |
| Registered electors | | 13,788 | |
| Majority | | | |
This was a new constituency created.
