= Labuk-Sugut =

Former constituency in Sabah, Malaysia

Sabah constituency

Defunct federal constituency
- Legislature: Dewan Rakyat
- Constituency created: 1966
- Constituency abolished: 1986
- First contested: 1969
- Last contested: 1982

Labuk-Sugut was a federal constituency in Sabah, Malaysia, that was represented in the Dewan Rakyat from 1971 to 1986.

The federal constituency was created in the 1966 redistribution and was mandated to return a single member to the Dewan Rakyat under the first past the post voting system.

== History ==
Labuk Sugut parliament seat was renamed ‘Jambongan’ in 1986, then Beluran in 1995 until now when it was redistributed.

=== Representation history ===
Members of Parliament for Labuk-Sugut
Parliament	No	Years	Member	Party	Vote Share
Constituency created
		1969-1971	Parliament was suspended		
3rd	P117	1971-1973	Ajad Oyung (اجد اويوڠ)	USNO	Uncontested
3rd	P117	1973-1974	Ajad Oyung (اجد اويوڠ)	BN (USNO)	Uncontested
4th	P118	1974-1978	Ajad Oyung (اجد اويوڠ)	BN (USNO)	Uncontested
5th	P118	1978-1982	Ampong Puyon (امڤوڠ ڤويون)	BN (USNO)	4,224; 52.14%
6th	P118	1982-1986	Hassan Alban Sandukong (حسن البن سندوكوڠ)	Independent	6,120; 60.74%
Constituency abolished, split into Jambongan and Kinabalu

=== State constituency ===
Parliamentary constituency	State constituency					
Parliamentary constituency	1967–1974	1974–1985	1985–1995	1995–2004	2004–2020	2020–present
Labuk-Sugut	Labuk					
Labuk-Sugut		Semawang				
Labuk-Sugut	Sugut					

=== Historical boundaries ===
State Constituency	Area	
State Constituency	1966	1974
Labuk	Beluran; Gum-Gum; Kuala Sapi; Sungai Sibuga; Telupid	Beluran; Kampung Balaban; Labuk; Kuala Sapi; Telupid
Semawang		Gum-Gum; Libaran; Semawang; Sungai Manila; Sungai Sibuga
Sugut	Pulau Jambongan; Pulau Kanawi; Paitan; Pamol; Sugut	Lingkabau; Pulau Jambongan; Paitan; Pamol; Sugut

== Election results ==
Malaysian general election, 1982: Labuk-Sugut
Party	Candidate	Votes	%	∆%
Independent	Hassan Alban Sandukong	6,120	60.74	▲60.74
BN	Ampong Puyon	3,955	39.26	▼12.80
Total valid votes		10,075	100.00	
Total rejected ballots		283		
Unreturned ballots		0		
Turnout		10,358	59.70	▼0.82
Registered electors		17,350		
Majority		2,165	21.48	▲17.20
Independent gain from BN		Swing		?

Malaysian general election, 1978: Labuk-Sugut
Party	Candidate	Votes	%	∆%
BN	Ampong Puyon	4,224	52.14	▲52.14
Independent	Anthony Nicol Sidol	3,877	47.86	▲47.86
Total valid votes		8,101	100.00	
Total rejected ballots		557		
Unreturned ballots		0		
Turnout		8,658	60.52	
Registered electors		14,307		
Majority		347	4.28	
BN hold		Swing		

Malaysian general election, 1974: Labuk-Sugut
Party	Candidate	Votes	%	∆%
On the nomination day, Ajad Oyung won uncontested.
BN	Ajad Oyung			
Total valid votes			100.00	
Total rejected ballots				
Unreturned ballots				
Turnout				
Registered electors		9,930		
Majority				
BN gain from USNO		Swing		?

Malaysian general election, 1969: Labuk-Sugut
Party	Candidate	Votes	%
On the nomination day, Ajad Oyung won uncontested.
USNO	Ajad Oyung		
Total valid votes			100.00
Total rejected ballots			
Unreturned ballots			
Turnout			
Registered electors		11,742	
Majority			
This was a new constituency created.
