= Krian (Federal Legislative Council constituency) =

Former constituency in Malaysia

Perak constituency

Defunct federal constituency
- Legislature: Dewan Rakyat
- Constituency created: 1955
- Constituency abolished: 1959
- First contested: 1955
- Last contested: 1955

Krian was a federal constituency in Perak, Malaysia, that was represented in the Federal Legislative Council from 1955 to 1959. The federal constituency was created as part of the 1955 redistribution and is mandated to return a single member to the Federal Legislative Council under the first past-the-post voting system.

== History ==
It was abolished in 1959 when the constituency boundaries were redrawn.

=== Representation history ===
Members of Parliament for Krian
Parliament	Years	Member	Party	Vote Share
Constituency created
1st	1955–1959	Ahmad Tuan Hussain (احمد توان حسين)	PMIP	8,685; 42.92%
Constituency abolished, split into Krian Laut and Krian Darat

=== State constituency ===
Parliamentary constituency	State constituency						
Parliamentary constituency	1955–1959*	1959–1974	1974–1986	1986–1995	1995–2004	2004–2018	2018–present
Krian	Krian East						
Krian	Krian West						

== Election results ==
Malayan general election, 1955: Krian
Party	Candidate	Votes	%
PMIP	Ahmad Tuan Hussain	8,685	42.92
Alliance	Sulaiman Ahmad	8,235	40.70
National Association of Perak	Mohd Jan Ngah Mohamed	3,315	16.38
Total valid votes		20,235	100.00
Total rejected ballots			
Unreturned ballots			
Turnout		20,235	78.20
Registered electors		25,777	
Majority		450	2.22
This was a new constituency created.
Source(s): The Straits Times.
