= Mantin (federal constituency) =

Negeri Sembilan constituency

Defunct federal constituency
- Legislature: Dewan Rakyat
- Constituency created: 1974
- Constituency abolished: 1986
- First contested: 1974
- Last contested: 1982

Mantin was a federal constituency in Negeri Sembilan, Malaysia, that was represented in the Dewan Rakyat from 1974 to 1986.

The federal constituency was created in the 1974 redistribution and was mandated to return a single member to the Dewan Rakyat under the first past the post voting system.

== History ==
It was abolished in 1986 when it was redistributed.

=== Representation history ===
Members of Parliament for Mantin
Parliament	No	Years	Member	Party	Vote Share
Constituency created from Seremban Barat and Seremban Timor
4th	P090	1974-1978	Lee Boon Peng (李文彬)	BN (MCA)	13,773; 72.53%
5th	P090	1978-1982	Lee Boon Peng (李文彬)	BN (MCA)	15,723; 60.10%
6th	P090	1982-1986	Lee Boon Peng (李文彬)	BN (MCA)	20,196; 65.33%
Constituency abolished, split into Seremban and Rasah

=== State constituency ===
Parliamentary constituency	State constituency						
Parliamentary constituency	1955–59*	1959–1974	1974–1986	1986–1995	1995–2004	2004–2018	2018–present
Mantin			Labu				
Mantin			Lenggeng				
Mantin			Pantai				
Mantin			Rantau				

=== Historical boundaries ===
State Constituency	Area
State Constituency	1974
Labu	Enstek; Gadong; Labu; Sendayan; Seriemas
Lenggeng	Batang Benar; Bukit Puyoh; Lenggeng; Mantin; Pajam
Pantai	Kampung Buit Kubot; Kampung Jerlang; Kampung Orang Asli Ngoi Ngoi; Pantai; Sikamat
Rantau	Kampung Kanchong; Kampung Silau; Nusari Bayu; Rantau; Taman Angsamas

== Election results ==
Malaysian general election, 1982
Party	Candidate	Votes	%	∆%
BN	Lee Boon Peng	20,196	65.33	▲5.23
DAP	Hu Sepang	9,177	29.69	▲0.16
Independent	Baharum Ibrahim	1,539	4.98	▲4.98
Total valid votes		30,912	100.00	
Total rejected ballots		886		
Unreturned ballots		0		
Turnout		31,798	77.10	▼1.15
Registered electors		41,244		
Majority		11,019	35.64	▼5.07
BN hold		Swing		

Malaysian general election, 1978
Party	Candidate	Votes	%	∆%
BN	Lee Boon Peng	15,723	60.10	▼12.43
DAP	Hu Sepang	7,726	29.53	▲15.40
PAS	Shahari Hassan	2,714	10.37	▲10.37
Total valid votes		26,163	100.00	
Total rejected ballots		952		
Unreturned ballots		0		
Turnout		27,115	78.25	▲3.40
Registered electors		34,650		
Majority		7,997	30.57	▼27.83
BN hold		Swing		

Malaysian general election, 1974
Party	Candidate	Votes	%
BN	Lee Boon Peng	13,773	72.53
DAP	Sinnathamby Seevaratnam	2,683	14.13
Parti Rakyat Malaysia	Yik Chee Chong @ Yik Kok Kheong	1,451	7.64
PEKEMAS	Ajus Jais	783	4.12
Independent	Ahmad Abdul Manaf	300	1.58
Total valid votes		18,990	100.00
Total rejected ballots		1,052	
Unreturned ballots		0	
Turnout		20,042	74.85
Registered electors		26,777	
Majority		11,090	58.40
This was a new constituency created.
