= Ulu Padas =

Sabah constituency

Defunct federal constituency
- Legislature: Dewan Rakyat
- Constituency created: 1974
- Constituency abolished: 1986
- First contested: 1974
- Last contested: 1982

Ulu Padas was a federal constituency in Sabah, Malaysia, that was represented in the Dewan Rakyat from 1974 to 1986.

The federal constituency was created in the 1974 redistribution and was mandated to return a single member to the Dewan Rakyat under the first past the post voting system.

== History ==
It was abolished in 1986 when it was redistributed.

=== Representation history ===
Members of Parliament for Ulu Padas
Parliament	No	Years	Member	Party	Vote Share
Constituency created, renamed from Sabah Selatan
4th	P129	1974-1978	Abdul Rashid Jais (عبدالرشيد جاءيس)	BN (USNO)	Uncontested
5th	P129	1978-1982	Harris Salleh (هرريس محمد صالح)	BN (BERJAYA)	Uncontested
6th	P129	1982-1985	Harris Salleh (هرريس محمد صالح)	BN (BERJAYA)	8,252; 72.81%
6th	P129	1985-1986	Kadoh Agundong	PBS	7,196; 59.32%
Constituency abolished, renamed to Padas

=== State constituency ===
Parliamentary constituency	State constituency					
Parliamentary constituency	1967–1974	1974–1985	1985–1995	1995–2004	2004–2020	2020–present
Ulu Padas		Kemabong				
Ulu Padas		Sipitang				
Ulu Padas		Tenom				

=== Historical boundaries ===
State Constituency	Area
State Constituency	1974
Kemabong	Katubuh; Kampung Baru Jumpa; Kemabong; Mansasoh; Tomani
Sipitang	Long Pasia; Melalia; Mesapol; Sindumin; Sipitang
Tenom	Melalap; Mentalik; Pamilaan; Pangi; Tenom

== Election results ==
Malaysian general by-election, 11–12 October 1985: Ulu Padas Upon the resignation of incumbent, Harris Salleh
Party	Candidate	Votes	%	∆%
PBS	Kadoh Agundong	7,196	59.32	▲59.32
BN	Jinuin Jimin	4,934	40.68	▼32.13
Total valid votes		12,130	100.00	
Total rejected ballots				
Unreturned ballots				
Turnout				
Registered electors				
Majority		2,262	18.64	▼32.24
PBS gain from BN		Swing		?

Malaysian general election, 1982: Ulu Padas
Party	Candidate	Votes	%	∆%
BN	Harris Salleh	8,252	72.81	▲72.81
Independent	Halik Zaman	2,486	21.93	▲21.93
PASOK	Jamparon Laja	425	3.75	▲3.75
Independent	Lawrence Liki	171	1.51	▲1.51
Total valid votes		11,334	100.00	
Total rejected ballots		261		
Unreturned ballots		0		
Turnout		11,595	73.22	
Registered electors		15,835		
Majority		5,766	50.88	
BN hold		Swing		

Malaysian general election, 1978: Ulu Padas
Party	Candidate	Votes	%	∆%
On the nomination day, Harris Salleh won uncontested.
BN	Harris Salleh			
Total valid votes			100.00	
Total rejected ballots				
Unreturned ballots				
Turnout				
Registered electors				
Majority				
BN hold		Swing		

Malaysian general election, 1974: Ulu Padas
Party	Candidate	Votes	%
On the nomination day, Abdul Rashid Jais won uncontested.
BN	Abdul Rashid Jais		
Total valid votes			100.00
Total rejected ballots			
Unreturned ballots			
Turnout			
Registered electors		10,977	
Majority			
This was a new constituency created.
