= Seremban Barat (federal constituency) =

Negeri Sembilan constituency

Defunct federal constituency
- Legislature: Dewan Rakyat
- Constituency created: 1958
- Constituency abolished: 1974
- First contested: 1959
- Last contested: 1969

Seremban Barat was a federal constituency in Negeri Sembilan, Malaysia, that was represented in the Dewan Rakyat from 1959 to 1974.

The federal constituency was created in the 1974 redistribution and was mandated to return a single member to the Dewan Rakyat under the first past the post voting system.

== History ==
It was abolished in 1974 when it was redistributed.

=== Representation history ===
Members of Parliament for Seremban Barat
Parliament	No	Years	Member	Party	Vote Share
Constituency created from Seremban
Parliament of the Federation of Malaya
1st	P084	1959-1963	Quek Kai Dong (郭开东)	Independent	4,752; 38.94%
Parliament of Malaysia
1st	P084	1963-1964	Quek Kai Dong (郭凯东)	Independent	4,752; 38.94%
2nd	P084	1964-1969	Siow Loong Hin (萧隆兴)	Alliance (MCA)	10,163; 53.90%
		1969-1971	Parliament was suspended		
3rd	P084	1971-1974	Sinnathamby Seevaratnam (சின்னாதம்பி சீவரத்னம்)	DAP	11,705; 59.44%
Constituency abolished, split into Seremban and Mantin

=== State constituency ===
Parliamentary constituency	State constituency						
Parliamentary constituency	1955–59*	1959–1974	1974–1986	1986–1995	1995–2004	2004–2018	2018–present
Seremban Barat		Bukit Nanas					
Seremban Barat		Labu					
Seremban Barat		Lenggeng					

=== Historical boundaries ===
State Constituency	Area
State Constituency	1959
Bukit Nanas	Bukit Nanas; Lobak; Kampung Dato' Mansur; Mambau; Rasah
Labu	FELDA LB Johnson; Gadong; Jijan; Nilai; Sendayan
Lenggeng	Batang Benar; Kampung Baru Ulu Beranang; Kampung Daching; Lenggeng; Mantin

== Election results ==
Malaysian general election, 1969
Party	Candidate	Votes	%	∆%
DAP	Sinnathamby Seevaratnam	11,705	59.44	▲59.44
Alliance	Tai Kon Chin	7,277	36.95	▼16.95
United Malaysian Chinese Organisation	Tan Kee Jon	710	3.61	▲3.61
Total valid votes		19,692	100.00	
Total rejected ballots		978		
Unreturned ballots		0		
Turnout		20,670	74.09	▼4.90
Registered electors		27,900		
Majority		4,428	22.49	▲4.06
DAP gain from Alliance Party (Malaysia) Party (Malaysia)		Swing		?

Malaysian general election, 1964
Party	Candidate	Votes	%	∆%
Alliance	Siow Loong Hin	10,163	53.90	▲25.96
Socialist Front	Koo Eng Kuang	6,688	35.47	▲3.11
UDP	Oh Siew Kheng	2,005	10.63	▲10.63
Total valid votes		18,856	100.00	
Total rejected ballots		700		
Unreturned ballots		0		
Turnout		19,556	78.99	
Registered electors		24,758		
Majority		3,475	18.43	▲11.85
Alliance gain from Independent		Swing		?

Malayan general election, 1959
Party	Candidate	Votes	%
Independent	Quek Kai Dong	4,752	38.94
Socialist Front	S. Sathappan	3,949	32.36
Alliance	A. S. Dawood	3,409	27.94
Independent	C. Rajadurai	93	0.76
Total valid votes		12,203	100.00
Total rejected ballots		71	
Unreturned ballots		0	
Turnout		12,274	83.26
Registered electors		14,741	
Majority		803	6.58
This was a new constituency created.
