= Labuan-Beaufort =

Sabah constituency

Defunct federal constituency
- Legislature: Dewan Rakyat
- Constituency created: 1966
- Constituency abolished: 1974
- First contested: 1969
- Last contested: 1969

Labuan-Beaufort was a federal constituency in Sabah, Malaysia, that was represented in the Dewan Rakyat from 1971 to 1974.

The federal constituency was created in the 1966 redistribution and was mandated to return a single member to the Dewan Rakyat under the first past the post voting system.

== History ==
It was abolished in 1974 when it was redistributed.

=== Representation history ===
Members of Parliament for Labuan-Beaufort
Parliament	No	Years	Member	Party	Vote Share
Constituency created
		1969-1971	Parliament was suspended		
3rd	P112	1971-1973	Chik Johari Ondu Majakil (چيق جوهري اوندو ماجاكيل)	USNO	Uncontested
3rd	P112	1973-1974	Chik Johari Ondu Majakil (چيق جوهري اوندو ماجاكيل)	BN (USNO)	Uncontested
Constituency abolished, split into Kimanis and Hilir Padas

=== State constituency ===
Parliamentary constituency	State constituency					
Parliamentary constituency	1967–1974	1974–1985	1985–1995	1995–2004	2004–2020	2020–present
Labuan-Beaufort	Beaufort					
Labuan-Beaufort	Labuan					

=== Historical boundaries ===
State Constituency	Area
State Constituency	1966
Beaufort	Beaufort; Klias; Lumadan; Lumat; Weston
Labuan	Kalugus; Labuan; Menumbok; Tanjung Aru; Victoria

== Election results ==
Malaysian general election, 1969: Labuan-Beaufort
Party	Candidate	Votes	%
On the nomination day, Chik Johari Ondu Majakil won uncontested.
USNO	Chik Johari Ondu Majakil		
Total valid votes			100.00
Total rejected ballots			
Unreturned ballots			
Turnout			
Registered electors		13,182	
Majority			
This was a new constituency created.
