= Jambongan =

Federal constituency in Sabah, Malaysia

Sabah constituency

Defunct federal constituency
- Legislature: Dewan Rakyat
- Constituency created: 1984
- Constituency abolished: 1995
- First contested: 1986
- Last contested: 1990

Jambongan was a federal constituency in Sabah, Malaysia, that was represented in the Dewan Rakyat from 1986 to 1995.

The federal constituency was created in the 1984 redistribution and was mandated to return a single member to the Dewan Rakyat under the first past the post voting system.

== History ==
It was abolished in 1995 when it was redistributed.

=== Representation history ===
Members of Parliament for Jambongan
Parliament	No	Years	Member	Party	Vote Share
Constituency renamed from Labuk-Sugut
7th	P139	1986-1990	Michael Metah Asang	BN (PBS)	7,495; 73.11%
8th	P139	1990-1995	Michael Metah Asang	GR (PBS)	8,817; 59.51%
Constituency abolished, split into Beluran and Libaran

=== State constituency ===
Parliamentary constituency	State constituency					
Parliamentary constituency	1967–1974	1974–1985	1985–1995	1995–2004	2004–2020	2020–present
Jambongan			Labuk			
Jambongan			Sugut			
Jambongan			Sungai Sibuga			

=== Historical boudaries ===
State Constituency	Area
State Constituency	1984
Labuk	Beluran; Kampong Kaniogan; Kampung Kolapis; Semawang; Telupid
Sugut	Jambongan; Lingkabau; Paitan; Pamol; Telupid
Sungai Sibuga	Gum-Gum; Kampung Tinusa; Pulau Libaran; Sungai Manila; Sungai Sibuga

== Election results ==
Malaysian general election, 1990: Jambongan
Party	Candidate	Votes	%	∆%
PBS	Metah Asang @ Michael Asang	8,817	59.51	▲59.51
Independent	Ridi Alawangsa	5,393	36.40	▲36.40
AKAR	Thamrin Zaini	376	2.54	▲2.54
Independent	Nordin Khani	231	1.56	▲1.56
Total valid votes		14,817	100.00	
Total rejected ballots		174		
Unreturned ballots		0		
Turnout		14,991	50.20	▲1.63
Registered electors		29,864		
Majority		3,424	23.11	▼23.11
PBS gain from BN		Swing		?

Malaysian general election, 1986: Jambongan
Party	Candidate	Votes	%
BN	Metah Asang @ Michael Asang	7,495	73.11
PAS	Hamzah Abdullah	2,757	26.89
Total valid votes		10,252	100.00
Total rejected ballots		174	
Unreturned ballots		0	
Turnout		10,426	48.57
Registered electors		21,468	
Majority		4,738	46.22
This was a new constituency created.
