= List of Malayan state and settlement electoral districts (1954–1959) =

This is a list of the Malayan state and settlement electoral districts used between 1954 and 1959. This arrangement was used in the 1954 and 1955 Malayan state election.

== Perlis ==
State constituency
Arau
Beseri-Titi Tinggi
Kangar
Kuala Perlis
Kurong Anai
Mata Ayer
Paya
Sanglang
Utan Aji

== Kedah ==
State constituency
Alor Star-Langkawi
Baling
Jerai
Jitra-Padang Terap
Kubang Pasu Barat
Kota Star Barat Laut
Kota Star Selatan
Kota Star Timor-Padang
Kulim Utara
Kulim-Bandar Bahru
Sik-Gurun-Kota
Sungei Patani

== Kelantan ==
State constituency
Bachok Utara
Bachok Selatan
Kota Bharu Bandar
Kota Bharu Selatan
Machang
Pasir Puteh Utara
Pasir Mas Tengah
Pasir Mas Utara
Ulu Kelantan

== Trengganu ==
State constituency
Bandar Kuala Trengganu
Dungun
Kuala Trengganu Barat
Kuala Trengganu Utara
Paka-Kemaman Utara
Setiu
Ulu Besut
Ulu Trengganu

== Penang Settlement ==
Settlement constituency
Batu Kawan
Bukit Mertajam
Butterworth
East Coast
Jelutong
Kelawei
North Coast
Province Wellesley Central
Province Wellesley North
Province Wellesley South
South Coast
Tanjong East
Tanjong West
West Coast

== Perak ==
State constituency
Batang Padang North
Batang Padang South
Dindings
Ipoh East
Ipoh North
Ipoh South
Kinta North
Kinta South
Krian East
Krian West
Kuala Kangsar
Larut South-Matang
Lower Perak North
Lower Perak South
Parit
Selama-Larut North
Sungei Siput
Taiping
Telok Anson
Upper Perak

== Pahang ==
State constituency
Jerantut Utara
Jerantut Tengah
Jerantut Selantan
Lipis Utara
Lipis Timur
lipis selatan
Lipis Barat
Lipis Barat Daya

== Selangor ==
State constituency
Klang North
Klang South
Kuala Langat
Kuala Lumpur East
Kuala Lumpur Municipality East
Kuala Lumpur Municipality South
Kuala Lumpur Municipality West
Kuala Lumpur South
Kuala Lumpur West
Kuala Selangor
Sabak Bernam
Selangor Ulu
Ulu Langat

== Negri Sembilan ==
State constituency
Jelebu
Jempol
Johol
Labu
Lenggeng
Linggi
Pilah
Port Dickson
Rantau
Rembau
Seremban
Tampin

== Malacca ==
Settlement constituency
Alor Gajah East
Alor Gajah West
East Central
East Fort
Jasin North
Jasin South
West Central
West Fort

== Johore ==
State constituency
Batu Pahat Central
Batu Pahat Coastal
Batu Pahat Inland
Johore Bahru Central
Johore Bahru Coastal
Johore Bahru Inland
Kluang
Kota Tinggi
Mersing
Muar Central
Muar Coastal
Muar Inland
Pontian
Segamat North
Segamat South
Tangkak
