= List of Malayan federal electoral districts (1955–1959) =

This is a list of the Malayan federal electoral districts used between 1955 and 1959. During this period, the Federal Legislative Council had 52 seats. This arrangement was only used in the 1955 Malayan general election.

== Perlis ==
Federal constituency	Population	Electorate	Malays electorate	Chinese electorate	Indians electorate	Others electorate	Notes
Perlis	70,490	30,936	29,069	923	183	761	The State of Perlis

== Kedah ==
Federal constituency	Population	Electorate	Malays electorate	Chinese electorate	Indians electorate	Others electorate	Notes
Alor Star	109,800	35,264	32,348	2,367	449	100	The district of Langkawi, the town of Alor Star, and the mukims of Alor Malai, Alor Merah, Derga, Kota Star, Anak Bukit, Mergong, Pumpong, Pengkalan Kundor, Kuala Kedah, Telok Chengai, Telok Kechai, Kubang Rotan, Padang Lalang, Sungei Bahru, Padang Hang, Gunong and Titi Gajah.
Kedah Selatan	90,800	25,927	22,265	1,898	1,601	163	The districts of Kulim and Bandar Bahru, and the mukims of Sidam Kiri, Pinang Tunggal and Bakai.
Kedah Tengah	94,700	37,219	34,967	985	329	938	The districts of Yen and Sik, and the mukims of Gurun, Semiling, Bujang, Merbok, Bukit Meriam, Haji Kudong Kota, Kuala and Rantau Panjang
Kedah Utara	80,200	33,972	32,091	507	74	1,300	The districts of Kubang Pasu and Padang Terap.
Kota Star	86,400	34,048	32,249	1,113	47	639	The mukims of Ayer Puteh, Bukit Lada, Bukit Pinang, Bukit Raya, Derang, Gajah Mati, Guar Kepayang, Hutan Kampong, Jabi, Kangkong, Langgar, Lengkuas, Lepai, Lesong, Limbong, Padang Kerbau, Padang Peliang, Padang Pusing, Rambai, Sala Kechil, Tajar, Tebengau, Telaga Mas Tobiar and Tualang.
Sungei Muda	92,100	27,435	24,725	1,546	601	563	The district of Baling, excluding the mukims of Bakai and the town of Sungei Patani and mukims of Pekula, Simpor, Sungei Pasir, Sungei Patani and Telui Kiri.

== Kelantan ==
Federal constituency	Population	Electorate	Malays electorate	Chinese electorate	Indians and others electorate	Notes
Kelantan Selatan	75,400	39,032	37,436	1,279	317	The districts of Hulu Kelantan (Gua Musang, Kuala Krai, Jeli), Tanah Merah and Machang.
Kelantan Tengah	100,000	43,277	41,708	1,362	207	Town council of Kota Bharu, the daerahs of Limbat Banggu, Peringat, Pendek, Beta, Salor, Kadok, Pangkal Kalong and parts of Lundang and Kota.
Kelantan Timor	99,300	46,235	45,298	481	456	Pasir Puteh and Bachok.
Kelantan Utara	93,300	42,554	39,412	1,028	2,114	Tumpat district, and the daerahs (mukims) of Badang, Kamumin, Sering and a portion of Panji.
Pasir Mas	75,800	34,803	33,269	946	588	The district of Pasir Mas.

== Trengganu ==
Federal constituency	Population	Electorate	Malays electorate	Chinese electorate	Indians and others electorate	Notes
Trengganu Selatan	53,700	23,846	23,534	295	17	The districts of Marang, Dungun and Kemaman.
Trengganu Tengah	88,900	33,747	32,982	735	30	The district of Kuala Trengganu and its town, and the district of Ulu Trengganu.
Trengganu Utara	83,300	35,355	35,066	268	21	Besut and the mukims of Merang, Belara, Kuala Nerus, Manir, Pulau Pulau, Batu Rakit, Ulu Nerus and Pulau Redang.

== Penang-Province Wellesley ==
Federal constituency	Population	Electorate	Malays electorate	Chinese electorate	Indians electorate	Others electorate	Notes
George Town	137,000	20,016	3,410	13,912	2,452	242	The Municipal ward of Tanjong, and the three polling districts in the Municipal ward of Jelutong.
Penang Island	125,700	27,336	14,663	10,604	1,626	443	The south-west district (Balik Pulau) and the north-east district.
Wellesley North	83,800	28,190	20,594	5,534	1,932	141	Consisting of the Town Board area of Butterworth and the northern district of Province Wellesley lying outside Butterworth.
Wellesley South	99,900	23,238	15,576	5,027	2,585	50	The southern district of the Province and the central district of Province Wellesley lying outside Butterworth.

== Perak ==
Federal constituency	Population	Electorate	Malays electorate	Chinese electorate	Indians electorate	Others electorate	Notes
Batang Padang	80,300	14,355	10,815	1,892	1,644	4	The district of Batang Padang.
Dindings	84,100	16,464	11,903	3,627	932	2	The district of Dindings (now known as Manjung) and the mukims of Trong and Sungei Tinggi
Ipoh-Menglembu	116,000	11,610	3,766	6,521	1,261	62	The Ipoh-Menglembu town council area.
Kinta Selatan		16,295	10,164	4,578	1,549	4	The mukims of Kampar, Teja, Blanja, Sungei Trap and Tanjong Tualang.
Kinta Utara	83,200	12,474	8,052	2,571	1,851	nil	The mukims of Sungei Siput, Pulau Kamiri and Kota Lama Kanan in the district of Kuala Kangsar, and the mukim of Ulu Kinta and Sungei Raya in Kinta.
Krian	98,600	30,339	28,203	595	1,541	nil	The district of Krian.
Larut-Matang	113,000	31,072	23,362	4,199	3,472	39	The district of Larut and Matang, excluding the mukims of Trong and Sungei Tinggi.
Sungei Perak Hilir	70,800	26,038	25,716	202	119	1	The mukims of Blanja, Bota, Laiang-Laiang and Lambor in Kuala Kangsar, and the mukims of Pulau Tiga, Pasir Salak, Kampong Gajah, Pasir Panjang Ulu, Bandar, Kota Stia, Labu Kubong, Sungei Durian and Sungei Manik in Lower Perak.
Sungei Perak Ulu	88,100	29,665	25,136	3,411	119	1	The district of Upper Perak, and the mukims of Chegar Galah, Kampong Buaia, Kota Lama Kiri, Lubok Merbau, Saiong and Senggang in the administrative of Kuala Kangsar.
Telok Anson	95,000	18,154	14,909	1,691	1,546	8	The town of Telok Anson, and the mukims of Bagan Datoh, Durian Sebatang, Rungkup, Telok Bahru, Utan Melintang, and Changkat Jong.

== Pahang ==
Federal constituency	Population	Electorate	Malays electorate	Chinese electorate	Indians electorate	Others electorate	Notes
Pahang Timor	68,600	22,425	21,192	996	227	10	Kuantan, Rompin, Maran, and Pekan districts.
Semantan	84,900	20,004	17,944	1,938	113	9	Jerantut, Bera, Bentong and Temerloh districts.
Ulu Pahang	84,100	22,811	21,088	1,331	385	7	The districts of Lipis, Cameron Highlands and Raub.

== Selangor ==
Federal constituency	Population	Electorate	Malays electorate	Chinese electorate	Indians electorate	Others electorate	Notes
Kuala Lumpur Barat	132,300	8,875	4,988	2,485	1,168	234	The Municipal wards of Bangsar and Petaling, and the mukims of Batu and Kuala Lumpur lying outside the Municipality.
Kuala Lumpur Timor	123,100	13,209	8,697	2,944	1,202	366	The Municipal wards of Sentul and Imbi, the mukims of Ulu Klang, the portions of Setapak and Ampang lying outside the Municipality.
Kuala Selangor	89,600	21,506	20,639	645	214	8	The administrative district excluding the mukims of Ulu Tinggi, Batang Berjuntai and Jeram.
Langat	89,200	10,840	9,117	598	912	213	Ulu Langat and the mukims of Labu, Sepang, Batu and Morib.
Selangor Barat	98,400	13,844	11,665	1,138	701	340	In Klang, the mukims of Klang lying outside the town of Port Swettenham, and that portion of Klang lying south of Klang River, and the mukims of Bandar, Jugra, Kelanang, Tanjong Duablas, and Telok Panglima Garang.
Selangor Tengah	92,700	9,468	8,311	842	305	10	The mukims of Damansara, Kapar and Bukit Raja, including that part of Klang town lying north of the river, and the mukims of Petaling and Jugra.
Ulu Selangor	82,300	7,837	6,013	905	726	193	The district of Ulu Selangor, the mukims of Ulu Tinggi, Batang Berjuntai and Sungai Buloh.

== Negri Sembilan ==
Federal constituency	Population	Electorate	Malays electorate	Chinese electorate	Indians electorate	Others electorate	Notes
Negri Sembilan Utara	94,600	26,664	24,890	1,460	295	19	Kuala Pilah and Jelebu districts.
Negri Sembilan Selatan	81,000	18,677	16,244	1,331	1,060	42	Tampin, Rembau, Jempol, and Port Dickson districts.
Seremban	91,900	12,977	8,915	2,509	1,347	206	The district of Seremban.

== Malacca ==
Federal constituency	Population	Electorate	Malays electorate	Chinese electorate	Indians electorate	Others electorate	Notes
Malacca Central	117,300	27,033	17,782	6,752	1,831	669	Consisting of the central district, including the Municipality.
Malacca Luar	122,000	37,675	29,937	3,649	4,040	49	The northern district (Alor Gajah) and the southern district (Jasin).

== Johore ==
Federal constituency	Population	Electorate	Malays electorate	Chinese electorate	Indians electorate	Others electorate	Notes
Batu Pahat	98,200	26,921	20,698	5,679	536	8	The town of Batu Pahat, the mukims of Minyak Beku, Simpang Kanan, Peserai, Sri Gading, Tanjong Sembrong, Sri Linau, Cha'ah Bahru and the new village of Parit Yaani.
Johor Bahru	81,300	15,042	12,358	1,889	746	49	Johor Bahru town, the mukims of Tanjong Kupang, Pulai, Tebrau, Plentong, Sungei Tiram and Jelutong, a part of the new village of Kangkar Pulai, Gunong Pulai waterworks and parts of the districts of Johor Bahru and the mukims of Senai Kulai, and the new village of Ulu Choh.
Johore Selatan	102,300	29,090	25,097	3,833	160	nil	Pontian district, excluding the new village of Ulu Choh, and the mukims of Sungei Kluang, Sungei Punggor and Kampong Bahru in Batu Pahat.
Johore Tengah	97,700	11,716	7,054	3,253	1,356	53	Kluang district, excluding the mukims of Kahang, Paloh, Nyior in Johor Bahru, and the mukims of Sedenak, Senai Kulai.
Johore Timor	57,000	14,155	11,896	1,662	591	6	Kota Tinggi and Mersing districts and the mukims of Kahang.
Muar Selatan	113,000	34,436	27,906	6,344	175	11	Muar town and in the district of Muar and the mukims of Parit Bakar, Bandar, Kesang, Parit Jawa, Ayer Hitam, Sungei Balang and Sri Menanti; in the district of Batu Pahat, the mukims of Simpang Kiri, Bagan and Lubok and Sri Medan, excluding the new village of Parit Yaani.
Muar Utara	100,500	29,272	21,574	6,335	1,347	16	In Muar, the mukims of Tangkak, Serom, Kundang, Jalan Bakri, Sungei Terap, Sungei Raya, Jorak, Grisek, Bukit Serampang, Bukit Kepong and Lenga.
Segamat	86,500	17,482	10,869	4,323	2,267	23	The district of Segamat and the mukims of Paloh and Nyior in Kluang.
