= Kamal Ashaari =

Malaysian politician

Yang Berhormat Tuan Kamal Ashaari MP
- كمال اشعري

Member of the Malaysian Parliament for Kuala Krau
- Incumbent
- Assumed office 19 November 2022
- Preceded by: Ismail Mohamed Said (BN–UMNO)
- Majority: 1,024 (2022)

Personal details
- Born: Kamal bin Ashaari; 28 May 1970 (age 55) Felda Padang Piol, Jerantut, Pahang, Malaysia
- Citizenship: Malaysian
- Party: Malaysian Islamic Party (PAS)
- Other political affiliations: Perikatan Nasional (PN)

Kamal bin Ashaari (born 28 May 1970) is a Malaysian politician who has served as the Member of Parliament (MP) for Kuala Krau since November 2022. He is a member of the Malaysian Islamic Party (PAS), a component party of the Perikatan Nasional (PN) coalition.

== Election results ==
Selangor State Legislative Assembly
Year	Constituency	Candidate	Votes	Pct	Opponent(s)	Votes	Pct	Ballots cast	Majority	Turnout
2004	N12 Jeram	Kamal Ashaari (PAS)	3,587	28.24%	Amiruddin Setro (UMNO)	9,114	71.76%	13,015	5,527	77.07%

Pahang State Legislative Assembly
Year	Constituency	Candidate	Votes	Pct	Opponent(s)	Votes	Pct	Ballots cast	Majority	Turnout
2013	N28 Kerdau	Kamal Ashaari (PAS)	3,399	36.51%	Syed Ibrahim Syed Ahmad (UMNO)	5,912	63.49%	9,479	2,513	87.76%

Parliament of Malaysia
Year	Constituency	Candidate	Votes	Pct	Opponent(s)	Votes	Pct	Ballots cast	Majority	Turnout
2008	P087 Kuala Krau	Kamal Ashaari (PAS)	10,900	40.27%	Ismail Mohamed Said (UMNO)	16,165	59.73%	27,594	5,265	80.83%
2018	P087 Kuala Krau	Kamal Ashaari (PAS)	15,182	39.63%	Ismail Mohamed Said (UMNO)	18,058	47.14%	39,102	2,876	82.73%
2018	P087 Kuala Krau	Kamal Ashaari (PAS)	15,182	39.63%	Mohamad Rafidee Hassim (BERSATU)	5,071	13.24%	39,102	2,876	82.73%
2022	P087 Kuala Krau	Kamal Ashaari (PAS)	22,505	47.13%	Ismail Mohamed Said (UMNO)	21,481	44.98%	48,448	1,024	78.88%
2022	P087 Kuala Krau	Kamal Ashaari (PAS)	22,505	47.13%	Juhari Osman (AMANAH)	3,593	7.52%	48,448	1,024	78.88%
2022	P087 Kuala Krau	Kamal Ashaari (PAS)	22,505	47.13%	Shahruddin Md Salleh (PEJUANG)	174	0.36%	48,448	1,024	78.88%

== Honours ==
=== Honours of Malaysia ===
- Malaysia
  - Recipient of the 17th Yang di-Pertuan Agong Installation Medal (2024)

== See also ==
- Kuala Krau (federal constituency)
