= Deputy Minister of Home Affairs (Malaysia) =

Malaysian government deputy minister

- Timbalan Menteri Dalam Negeri
- Coat of Arms of Government of Malaysia
- Incumbent; Shamsul Anuar Nasarah since 10 December 2022
- Ministry of Home Affairs
- Style: Yang Berhormat
- Reports to: Prime Minister; Minister of Home Affairs
- Appointer: The Yang di-Pertuan Agong; on advice of the Prime Minister
- Term length: No fixed term
- Inaugural holder: Bahaman Samsuddin
- Formation: 1955

The Deputy Minister of Home Affairs (Malay: Timbalan Menteri Dalam Negeri; Chinese: 内政部副部长; Tamil: உள்துறை துணை அமைச்சர்) is a Malaysian cabinet position serving as deputy head of the Ministry of Home Affairs.

== List of Deputy Ministers of Home Affairs ==
The following individuals have been appointed as Deputy Minister of Home Affairs, or any of its precedent titles:

Colour key (for political coalition/parties):

Coalition	Component party	Timeline
Alliance Party	Parti Pesaka Bumiputera Bersatu (PBB)	–1973
Alliance Party	Malaysian Chinese Association (MCA)	1955–1973
Alliance Party	United Malays National Organisation (UMNO)	1955–1973
Barisan Nasional (BN)	Parti Pesaka Bumiputera Bersatu (PBB)	1973–2018
Barisan Nasional (BN)	Malaysian Chinese Association (MCA)	1973–present
Barisan Nasional (BN)	United Malays National Organisation (UMNO)	1973–present
Barisan Nasional (BN)	Sarawak Progressive Democratic Party (SPDP)	–2018
Barisan Nasional (BN)	Parti Rakyat Sarawak (PRS)	–2018
	Sabah Heritage Party (WARISAN)	2018–2020
Perikatan Nasional (PN)	Malaysian United Indigenous Party (BERSATU)	2020–present
Gabungan Rakyat Sabah (GRS)	Malaysian United Indigenous Party (BERSATU Sabah)	2020–present

=== Assistant Minister of Interior (1961–1964) ===
Portrait	Name (Birth–Death) Constituency	Political coalition	Political party	Took office	Left office	Prime Minister (Cabinet)
	Mohamed Ismail Mohamed Yusof (?–?); MP for Jerai	Alliance	UMNO	1961	1962	Tunku Abdul Rahman (II)
	Cheah Theam Swee (?–?); MP for Bukit Bintang	Alliance	MCA	1962	1964	Tunku Abdul Rahman (II)
Initially the post Deputy Minister of Home Affairs was created, after it was renamed to Assistant Minister of Interior, subsequently changed to Deputy Minister of Home Affairs
=== Assistant Minister of Justice (1964–) ===
Portrait	Name (Birth–Death) Constituency	Political coalition	Political party	Took office	Left office	Prime Minister (Cabinet)
	Abdul Rahman Ya'kub (?–?); MP for	Alliance	BUMIPUTERA	1964		Tunku Abdul Rahman (III)
=== Assistant Minister of Home Affairs ===
Portrait	Name (Birth–Death) Constituency	Political coalition	Political party	Took office	Left office	Prime Minister (Cabinet)
	Hamzah Abu Samah (1924–2012); MP for Raub	Alliance	UMNO		1969	Tunku Abdul Rahman (III)
	Mohamed Yaacob (1926–2009); MP for Tanah Merah	Alliance	UMNO	1970		Abdul Razak Hussein (I)
=== Deputy Minister of Home Affairs (1955–1957;–present) ===
Portrait	Name (Birth–Death) Constituency	Political coalition	Political party	Took office	Left office	Prime Minister (Cabinet)
	Bahaman Samsuddin (?–?); MP for Telok Anson	Alliance	UMNO	1955	31 August 1957	Tunku Abdul Rahman (I)
	Abdul Samad Idris (1923–2003); MP for Kuala Pilah	Alliance	UMNO		1976	Abdul Razak Hussein (I • II)
	Shariff Ahmad (?–?); MP for Jerantut	BN	UMNO	6 March 1976	31 December 1977	Hussein Onn (I)
	Rais Yatim (b.1942); MP for Jelebu	BN	UMNO	1 January 1978		Hussein Onn (I)
	Syed Ahmad Syed Mahmud Shahabuddin (1925–2008); MP for Padang Terap	BN	UMNO			Hussein Onn (II)
	Sanusi Junid (1942–2018); MP for Jerlun-Langkawi	BN	UMNO		16 July 1981	Hussein Onn (II)
	Abdul Rahim Thamby Chik (b.1950); MP for Alor Gajah	BN	UMNO	17 July 1981	30 April 1982	Mahathir Mohamad (I)
	Mohd. Kassim Ahmed (?–?); MP for Machang	BN	UMNO	30 April 1982	16 July 1984	Mahathir Mohamad (II)
	Mohd Radzi Sheikh Ahmad (b.1942); MP for Kangar	BN	UMNO	16 July 1984	10 August 1986	Mahathir Mohamad (II)
	Megat Junid Megat Ayub (1942–2008); MP for Pasir Salak	BN	UMNO	11 August 1986	2 July 1997	Mahathir Mohamad (III • IIII • V)
	Ong Ka Ting (b.1956); MP for Pontian	BN	MCA	8 May 1995	14 December 1999	Mahathir Mohamad (V)
	Azmi Khalid (b.1940); MP for Padang Besar	BN	UMNO	2 July 1997	14 December 1999	Mahathir Mohamad (V)
	Zainal Abidin Zin (b.1940); MP for Bagan Serai	BN	UMNO	15 December 1999	26 March 2004	Mahathir Mohamad (VI); Abdullah Ahmad Badawi (I)
	Tan Chai Ho (b.1949); MP for Bandar Tun Razak	BN	MCA	27 March 2004	18 March 2008	Abdullah Ahmad Badawi (II)
	Wan Ahmad Farid Wan Salleh (?–?); Senator	BN	UMNO	19 March 2008	9 April 2009	Abdullah Ahmad Badawi (III)
	Chor Chee Heung (b.1955); MP for Alor Setar	BN	MCA	19 March 2008	9 April 2009	Abdullah Ahmad Badawi (III)
	Abu Seman Yusop (b.1944); MP for Masjid Tanah	BN	UMNO	10 April 2009	15 May 2013	Najib Razak (I)
	Jelaing Mersat (b.1948); MP for Saratok	BN	SPDP	10 April 2009	4 June 2010	Najib Razak (I)
	Lee Chee Leong (b.1957); MP for Kampar	BN	MCA	4 June 2010	15 May 2013	Najib Razak (I)
	Wan Junaidi Tuanku Jaafar (b.1945); MP for Santubong	BN	PBB	16 May 2013	29 July 2015	Najib Razak (II)
	Nur Jazlan Mohamed (b.1966); MP for Pulai	BN	UMNO	29 July 2015	9 May 2018	Najib Razak (II)
	Masir Kujat (b.1954); MP for Sri Aman	BN	PRS	29 July 2015	9 May 2018	Najib Razak (II)
	Mohd. Azis Jamman (b.1974); MP for Sepanggar	–	WARISAN	2 July 2018	24 February 2020	Mahathir Mohamad (VII)
	Jonathan Yasin (b.1967); MP for Ranau	PN	BERSATU	10 March 2020	16 August 2021	Muhyiddin Yassin (I)
	Ismail Mohamed Said (b.1965); MP for Kuala Krau	BN	UMNO	10 March 2020	16 August 2021	Muhyiddin Yassin (I)
	Ismail Mohamed Said (b.1965); MP for Kuala Krau	BN	UMNO	30 August 2021	24 November 2022	Ismail Sabri Yaakob (I)
	Jonathan Yasin (b.1967); MP for Ranau	GRS	BERSATU Sabah	30 August 2021	24 November 2022	Ismail Sabri Yaakob (I)
	Shamsul Anuar Nasarah (b.1967); MP for Lenggong	BN	UMNO	10 December 2022	Incumbent	Anwar Ibrahim (I)

== See also ==
- Minister of Home Affairs (Malaysia)
