= Kuala Krau =

Federal constituency of Pahang, Malaysia

Kuala Krau (P087)
Pahang constituency

Federal constituency
- Legislature: Dewan Rakyat
- MP: Kamal Ashaari; PN
- Constituency created: 2003
- First contested: 2004
- Last contested: 2022

Demographics
- Population (2020): 68,047
- Electors (2022): 60,537
- Area (km²): 1,391
- Pop. density (per km²): 48.9

Kuala Krau (Pahang Malay: Kole Kgha) is a federal constituency in Temerloh District, Jerantut District and Maran District, Pahang, Malaysia, that has been represented in the Dewan Rakyat since 2004.

The federal constituency was created in the 2003 redistribution and is mandated to return a single member to the Dewan Rakyat under the first past the post voting system.

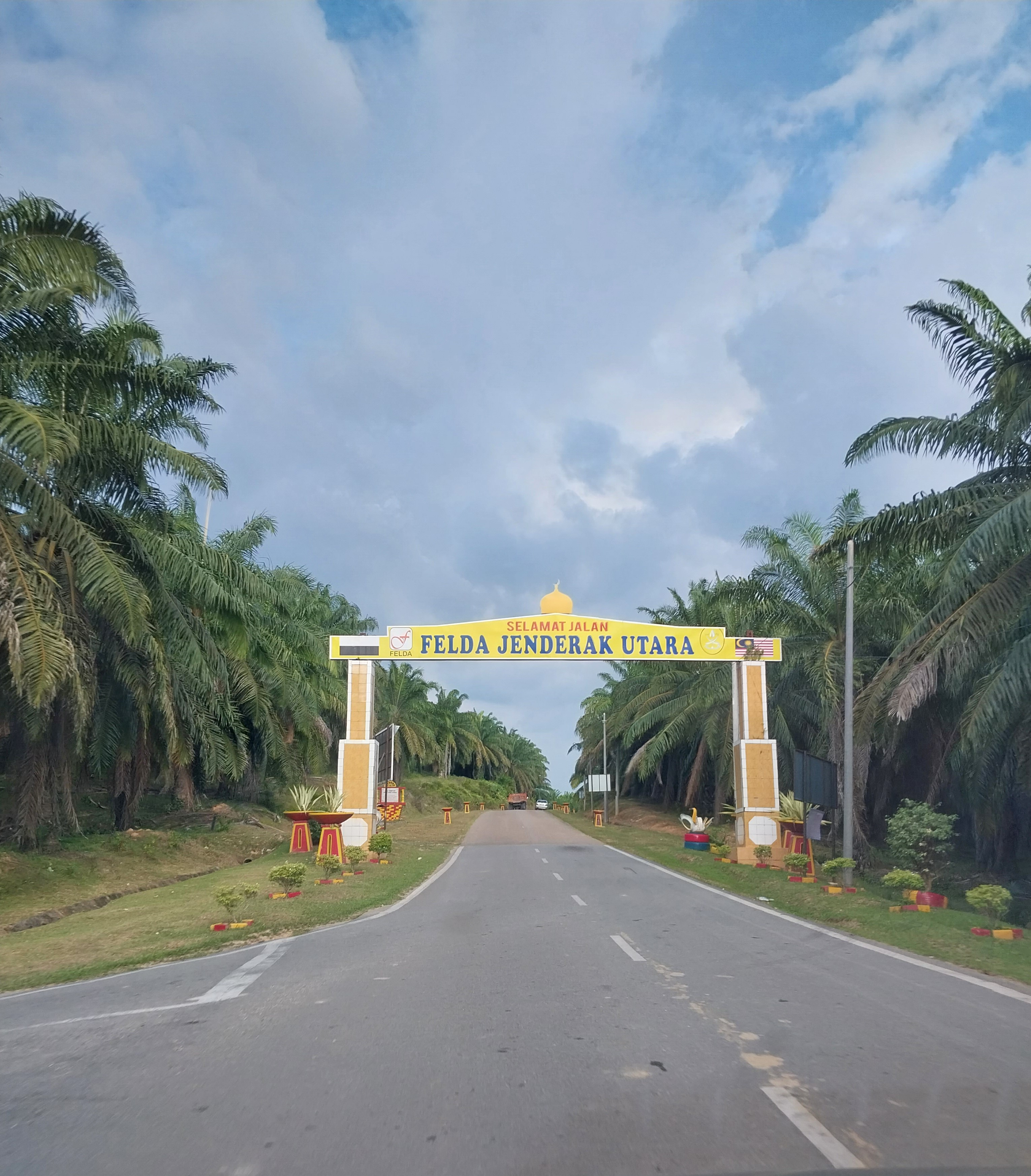
Felda Jenderak Utara Pahang.

== Demographics ==
Ethnic breakdown of Kuala Krau's electorate as of 2022
1. Malay (88.6%)
2. Other ethnicities (6.80%)
3. Chinese (2.50%)
4. Indian (2.10%)

As of 2020, Kuala Krau has a population of 68,047 people.

Age breakdown of Kuala Krau's electorate as of 2022
1. 18-20 (6.02%)
2. 21-29 (19.3%)
3. 30-39 (26.4%)
4. 40-49 (20.5%)
5. 50-59 (11.1%)
6. 60-69 (9.09%)
7. 70-79 (6.22%)
8. 80-89 (1.19%)
9. above 90 (0.18%)
Gender breakdown of Kuala Krau's electorate as of 2022
1. Male (49.5%)
2. Female (50.5%)

== History ==
=== Polling districts ===
According to the federal gazette issued on 31 October 2022, the Kuala Krau constituency is divided into 33 polling districts.

State constituency	Polling Districts	Code	Location
Jenderak (N27）	Kampung Pian	087/27/01	Dewan Orang Ramai Kampung Pian
Jenderak (N27）	Sungai Mai	087/27/02	Dewan Orang Ramai Kampung Gong Halt dan Balai Raya Kampung Gong Halt
Jenderak (N27）	Kuala Mai	087/27/03	SK Kuala Mai Bharu
Jenderak (N27）	Paya Luas	087/27/04	SK Paya Luas
Jenderak (N27）	Kuala Krau	087/27/05	SJK (C) Kuala Krau
Jenderak (N27）	FELDA Jenderak Utara	087/27/06	SK LKTP Jenderak Utara
Jenderak (N27）	Kampung Jenderak	087/27/07	SK Jenderak
Jenderak (N27）	Kampung Dato Shariff	087/27/08	Dewan Serbaguna Kampung Dato' Sharif Ahmad
Jenderak (N27）	FELDA Jenderak Selatan	087/28/09	SK LKTP Jenderak Selatan
Jenderak (N27）	Paya Pelong	087/27/10	Balai Raya Kampung Paya Pelong
Jenderak (N27）	Penderas	087/27/11	SK Penderas
Kerdau (N28)	Rumpun Makmur	087/28/01	Dewan Puspa Rumpun Makmur
Kerdau (N28)	FELDA Jengka 25	087/28/02	SK LKTP Jengka 25
Kerdau (N28)	FELDA Jengka 22	087/28/03	SK LKTP Jengka 22
Kerdau (N28)	Kampung Batu Sawar	087/28/04	SK Batu Sawar
Kerdau (N28)	FELDA Jengka 23	087/28/05	SK LKTP Jengka 23
Kerdau (N28)	Kuala Tekal	087/28/06	SK Kuala Tekal
Kerdau (N28)	Bukit Lada	087/28/07	SK Pulau Pasir Mandi
Kerdau (N28)	Kerai	087/28/08	Balai Raya Kerai
Kerdau (N28)	Lipat Kajang	087/28/09	SK Lipat Kajang
Kerdau (N28)	Desa Murni	087/28/10	SBPI Temerloh
Kerdau (N28)	Kerdau	087/28/11	SK Paya Taram
Kerdau (N28)	Kuala Kerdau	087/28/12	SK Kerdau
Kerdau (N28)	Teluk Sentang	087/28/13	SK Teluk Sentang
Jengka (N29)	FELDA Jengka 11	087/29/01	SK LKTP Jengka 11
Jengka (N29)	Bandar Pusat	087/29/02	SK Bandar Pusat Jengka; SMK Jengka Pusat
Jengka (N29)	FELDA Jengka 14	087/29/03	SK LKTP Jengka 14
Jengka (N29)	FELDA Jengka 21	087/29/04	SK LKTP Jengka 21
Jengka (N29)	FELDA Jengka 15	087/29/05	SK LKTP Jengka 15
Jengka (N29)	FELDA Jengka 16	087/29/06	SK LKTP Jengka 16
Jengka (N29)	FELDA Jengka 20	087/29/07	SK LKTP Jengka 20
Jengka (N29)	FELDA Jengka 17	087/29/08	SK LKTP Jengka 17
Jengka (N29)	FELDA Jengka 18	087/29/09	SK LKTP Jengka 18
Jengka (N29)	FELDA Jengka 19	087/29/10	SK LKTP Jengka 19

=== Representation history ===
Members of Parliament for Kuala Krau
Parliament	No	Years	Member	Party	Vote Share
Constituency created from Mentakab and Maran
11th	P087	2004–2008	Ismail Mohamed Said (إسماعيل بن محمد سعيد)	BN (UMNO)	16,021; 64.89%
12th	P087	2008–2013	Ismail Mohamed Said (إسماعيل بن محمد سعيد)	BN (UMNO)	16,165; 59.73%
13th	P087	2013–2018	Ismail Mohamed Said (إسماعيل بن محمد سعيد)	BN (UMNO)	21,573; 58.40%
14th	P087	2018–2022	Ismail Mohamed Said (إسماعيل بن محمد سعيد)	BN (UMNO)	18,058; 47.14%
15th	P087	2022–present	Kamal Ashaari (كمال اشعري)	PN (PAS)	22,505; 47.13%

=== State constituency ===
Parliamentary constituency	State constituency						
Parliamentary constituency	1955–59*	1959–1974	1974–1986	1986–1995	1995–2004	2004–2018	2018–present
Kuala Krau						Jenderak	
Kuala Krau						Jengka	
Kuala Krau						Kerdau	

=== Historical boundaries ===
State Constituency	Area	
State Constituency	2003	2018
Jenderak	FELDA Jenderak Selatan; FELDA Jenderak Utara; Kampung Pian; Kuala Krau; Penderas	
Jengka	Bandar Jengka; FELDA Jengka 11; FELDA Jengka 14; FELDA Jengka 15 - 21; Taman Jengka Impian	
Kerdau	Bandar Tun Razak; FELDA Jengka 22, 23 & 25; Kuala Kerdau; Lipat Kajang; Teluk Sentang	

=== Current state assembly members ===
No.	State Constituency	Member	Coalition (Party)
N27	Jenderak	Rodzuan Zaaba	BN (UMNO)
N28	Kerdau	Syed Ibrahim Syed Ahmad	BN (UMNO)
N29	Jengka	Shahril Azman Abd Halim	PN (PAS)

=== Local governments & postcodes ===
No.	State Constituency	Local Government	Postcode
N27	Jenderak	Temerloh Municipal Council; Jerantut District Council (Sungai Mai area)	26400, 26410, 26420, 26430, 26440, 26450, 26460 Bandar Pusat Jengka; 28050 Kuala Krau
N28	Kerdau	Temerloh Municipal Council	26400, 26410, 26420, 26430, 26440, 26450, 26460 Bandar Pusat Jengka; 28050 Kuala Krau
N29	Jengka	Maran District Council	26400, 26410, 26420, 26430, 26440, 26450, 26460 Bandar Pusat Jengka; 28050 Kuala Krau

== Election results ==
Malaysian general election, 2022: Kuala Krau
Party	Candidate	Votes	%	∆%
PN	Kamal Ashaari	22,505	47.13	▲47.13
BN	Ismail Mohamed Said	21,481	44.98	▼2.16
PH	Juhari Osman	3,593	7.52	▲7.52
PEJUANG	Shahruddin Md Salleh	174	0.36	▲0.36
Total valid votes		47,753	100.00	
Total rejected ballots		595		
Unreturned ballots		100		
Turnout		48,448	78.88	▼3.85
Registered electors		60,537		
Majority		1,024	2.15	▼5.36
PN gain from BN		Swing		?
Source(s) https://lom.agc.gov.my/ilims/upload/portal/akta/outputp/1753278/PUB611_2022.pdf

Malaysian general election, 2018: Kuala Krau
Party	Candidate	Votes	%	∆%
BN	Ismail Mohamed Said	18,058	47.14	▼11.26
PAS	Kamal Ashaari	15,182	39.63	▼1.97
PKR	Mohamad Rafidee Hassim	5,071	13.24	▲13.24
Total valid votes		38,311	100.00	
Total rejected ballots		613		
Unreturned ballots		178		
Turnout		39,102	82.73	▼4.85
Registered electors		47,264		
Majority		2,876	7.51	▼9.29
BN hold		Swing		
Source(s) "His Majesty's Government Gazette - Notice of Contested Election, Parliament for the State of Pahang [P.U. (B) 238/2018]" (PDF). Attorney General's Chambers of Malaysia. 3 May 2018. "Federal Government Gazette - Results of Contested Election and Statements of the Poll after the Official Addition of Votes, Parliamentary Constituencies for the State of Pahang [P.U. (B) 312/2018]" (PDF). Attorney General's Chambers of Malaysia. 28 May 2018.

Malaysian general election, 2013: Kuala Krau
Party	Candidate	Votes	%	∆%
BN	Ismail Mohamed Said	21,575	58.40	▼1.33
PAS	Shahril Azman Abdul Halim	15,370	41.60	▲1.33
Total valid votes		36,945	100.00	
Total rejected ballots		603		
Unreturned ballots		115		
Turnout		37,663	87.58	▲6.75
Registered electors		43,003		
Majority		6,205	16.80	▼2.66
BN hold		Swing		
Source(s) "Federal Government Gazette - Notice of Contested Election, Parliament for the State of Pahang [P.U. (B) 175/2013]" (PDF). Attorney General's Chambers of Malaysia. 26 April 2013. "Federal Government Gazette - Results of Contested Election and Statements of the Poll after the Official Addition of Votes, Parliamentary Constituencies for the State of Pahang [P.U. (B) 216/2013]" (PDF). Attorney General's Chambers of Malaysia. 22 May 2013. Archived from the original (PDF) on 2019-07-01.

Malaysian general election, 2008: Kuala Krau
Party	Candidate	Votes	%	∆%
BN	Ismail Mohamed Said	16,165	59.73	▼5.16
PAS	Kamal Ashaari	10,900	40.27	▲5.16
Total valid votes		27,065	100.00	
Total rejected ballots		479		
Unreturned ballots		50		
Turnout		27,594	80.83	▼0.52
Registered electors		34,139		
Majority		5,265	19.46	▼10.32
BN hold		Swing		

Malaysian general election, 2004: Kuala Krau
Party	Candidate	Votes	%
BN	Ismail Mohamed Said	16,021	64.89
PAS	Musaniff Ab Rahman	8,670	35.11
Total valid votes		24,691	100.00
Total rejected ballots		487	
Unreturned ballots		42	
Turnout		25,220	80.31
Registered electors		31,403	
Majority		7,351	29.78
This was a new constituency created.
