= Ismail Mohamed Said =

Malaysian politician

Yang Berbahagia Dato' Sri Ismail Mohamed Said PJN SSAP DSAP DIMP SMP KMN
- إسماعيل بن محمد سعيد

Deputy Minister of Home Affairs I
- In office 30 August 2021 – 24 November 2022 Serving with Jonathan Yasin (Deputy Minister of Home Affairs II)
- Monarch: Abdullah
- Prime Minister: Ismail Sabri Yaakob
- Minister: Hamzah Zainuddin
- Preceded by: Himself
- Succeeded by: Shamsul Anuar Nasarah (Deputy Minister of Home Affairs)
- Constituency: Kuala Krau
- In office 10 March 2020 – 16 August 2021 Serving with Jonathan Yasin (Deputy Minister of Home Affairs II)
- Monarch: Abdullah
- Prime Minister: Muhyiddin Yassin
- Minister: Hamzah Zainuddin
- Preceded by: Azis Jamman (Deputy Minister of Home Affairs)
- Succeeded by: Himself
- Constituency: Kuala Krau

Deputy Speaker of the Dewan Rakyat II
- In office 24 June 2013 – 10 May 2018 Serving with Ronald Kiandee
- Monarchs: Abdul Halim (2013–2016); Muhammad V (2016–2018)
- Prime Minister: Najib Razak
- Speaker: Pandikar Amin Mulia
- Preceded by: Wan Junaidi Tuanku Jaafar
- Succeeded by: Nga Kor Ming
- Constituency: Kuala Krau

Member of the Malaysian Parliament for Kuala Krau
- In office 21 March 2004 – 19 November 2022
- Preceded by: Position established
- Succeeded by: Kamal Ashaari (PN–PAS)
- Majority: 7,351 (2004); 5,265 (2008); 6,205 (2013); 2,876 (2018)

Faction represented in Dewan Rakyat
- 2004–2022: Barisan Nasional

Other roles
- 2010–2013: Chairman of the Perbadanan Tabung Pendidikan Tinggi Nasional

Personal details
- Born: Ismail bin Mohamed Said; 7 September 1965 (age 60) Pahang, Malaysia
- Party: United Malays National Organisation (UMNO)
- Other political affiliations: Barisan Nasional (BN)
- Spouse: Nor Azimah Abd Mubin
- Education: National University of Malaysia; Universiti Utara Malaysia
- Occupation: Politician

Ismail bin Mohamed Said (Jawi: إسماعيل بن محمد سعيد; born 7 September 1965) is a Malaysian politician who served as the Deputy Minister of Home Affairs I for two terms; first under former prime minister Muhyiddin Yassin and former Minister Hamzah Zainuddin, and then under former prime minister Ismail Sabri Yaakob and former Minister Hamzah Zainuddin. Member of Parliament (MP) for Kuala Krau from March 2004 to November 2022, the Deputy Speaker of the Dewan Rakyat in the BN administration from under former prime minister Najib Razak and former Speaker Pandikar Amin Mulia from June 2013 to May 2018. He is a member of the United Malays National Organisation (UMNO), a component party of the BN coalition. He is also former chairman of the Perbadanan Tabung Pendidikan Tinggi Nasional (PTPTN).

Ismail was elected to Parliament in the 2004 election, winning the UMNO-held seat of Kuala Krau, and was re-elected in 2008 and 2013. Before entering Parliament, Ismail was an official in UMNO's youth wing and operated a law firm in Temerloh.

As deputy speaker, he rejected the opposition's motion to discuss 1MDB scandal in the Dewan Rakyat, leading to chaos.

== Controversies and issues ==
=== Mass dumping of food ===
On 19 April 2024, Ismail admitted that he was responsible of, apologised for, regretted and promised to take full responsibility of the mass dumping of rice, flour and other food items at a garbage disposal site in Temerloh, Pahang after a video showing the food discarded there went viral on social media. Besides, Ismail explained that the items were bought by him using the allocations from the federal and Pahang state governments for the people during his tenure as the Kuala Krau MP. Ismail also shared that he had received complaints that a stench was coming from the storehouse for the food, several dead rats were found and the rice was also contaminated by rice weevils. He had also distributed some of the rice to the poultry farmers and the remainder had been disposed of.

== Election results ==
Parliament of Malaysia
Year	Constituency	Candidate	Votes	Pct	Opponent(s)	Votes	Pct	Ballots cast	Majority	Turnout
2004	P087 Kuala Krau	Ismail Mohamed Said (UMNO)	16,021	64.89%	Musaniff Ab Rahman (PAS)	8,670	35.11%	25,220	7,351	80.31%
2008	P087 Kuala Krau	Ismail Mohamed Said (UMNO)	16,165	59.73%	Kamal Ashaari (PAS)	10,900	40.27%	27,594	5,265	80.83%
2013	P087 Kuala Krau	Ismail Mohamed Said (UMNO)	21,575	58.40%	Shahril Azman Abd Halim (PAS)	15,370	41.60%	37,663	6,205	87.58%
2018	P087 Kuala Krau	Ismail Mohamed Said (UMNO)	18,058	47.14%	Kamal Ashaari (PAS)	15,182	39.63%	39,102	2,876	82.73%
2018	P087 Kuala Krau	Ismail Mohamed Said (UMNO)	18,058	47.14%	Mohd Rafidee Hassim (PPBM)	5,071	13.24%	39,102	2,876	82.73%
2022	P087 Kuala Krau	Ismail Mohamed Said (UMNO)	21,481	44.98%	Kamal Ashaari (PAS)	22,505	47.13%	48,448	1,024	78.88%
2022	P087 Kuala Krau	Ismail Mohamed Said (UMNO)	21,481	44.98%	Juhari Osman (AMANAH)	3,593	7.52%	48,448	1,024	78.88%
2022	P087 Kuala Krau	Ismail Mohamed Said (UMNO)	21,481	44.98%	Shahruddin Md Salleh (PEJUANG)	174	0.36%	48,448	1,024	78.88%

== Honours ==
=== Honours of Malaysia ===
- Malaysia
  - Commander of the Order of Meritorious Service (PJN) – Datuk (2014)
  - Officer of the Order of the Defender of the Realm (KMN) (2006)
- Pahang
  - Knight Grand Companion of the Order of Sultan Ahmad Shah of Pahang (SSAP) – Dato' Sri (2015)
  - Knight Companion of the Order of Sultan Ahmad Shah of Pahang (DSAP) – Dato' (2013)
  - Knight Companion of the Order of the Crown of Pahang (DIMP) – Dato' (2008)
  - Companion of the Order of the Crown of Pahang (SMP) (2006)
