= Shamsul Anuar Nasarah =

Malaysian politician (born 1966)

Yang Berhormat Datuk Seri Shamsul Anuar Nasarah SMW DJMK DPMP SMS PPN PPT MP
- شمس الأنوار نصرة

Deputy Minister of Home Affairs
- Incumbent
- Assumed office 10 December 2022
- Monarchs: Abdullah (2022–2024); Ibrahim Iskandar (since 2024)
- Prime Minister: Anwar Ibrahim
- Minister: Saifuddin Nasution Ismail
- Preceded by: Ismail Mohamed Said (Deputy Minister of Home Affairs I); Jonathan Yasin (Deputy Minister of Home Affairs II)
- Constituency: Lenggong

Minister of Energy and Natural Resources
- In office 10 March 2020 – 16 August 2021
- Monarch: Abdullah
- Prime Minister: Muhyiddin Yassin
- Deputy: Ali Biju
- Preceded by: Yeo Bee Yin (Minister of Energy, Science, Technology, Climate Change and Environment); Xavier Jayakumar Arulanandam (Minister of Water, Land and Natural Resources)
- Succeeded by: Takiyuddin Hassan
- Constituency: Lenggong

Member of the Malaysian Parliament for Lenggong
- Incumbent
- Assumed office 8 March 2008
- Preceded by: Khamsiyah Yeop (BN–UMNO)
- Majority: 4,919 (2008); 3,453 (2013); 5,773 (2018); 879 (2022)

Other roles
- 2013–2018: Chairman of Perbadanan Tabung Pendidikan Tinggi Nasional

Personal details
- Born: Shamsul Anuar bin Nasarah; 1 June 1966 (age 60) Lenggong, Perak, Malaysia
- Citizenship: Malaysian
- Party: United Malays National Organisation (UMNO)
- Other political affiliations: Barisan Nasional (BN)
- Spouse: Hamisah Hussin
- Children: 3
- Education: University of Malaya; Northern University of Malaysia
- Occupation: Politician
- Profession: Teacher
- Website: parlimenlenggong.com/profail/

Shamsul Anuar bin Nasarah (Jawi: شمس الأنوار بن نصرة; born 1 June 1967) is a Malaysian politician who has served as the Deputy Minister of Home Affairs in the Unity Government administration under Prime Minister Anwar Ibrahim and Minister Saifuddin Nasution Ismail since December 2022 and the Member of Parliament (MP) for Lenggong since March 2008. He served as the Minister of Energy and Natural Resources in the Perikatan Nasional (PN) administration under former Prime Minister Muhyiddin Yassin from March 2020 to his resignation in August 2021. He is a member of the United Malays National Organisation (UMNO) party in the Barisan Nasional (BN) coalition. He has also served as President of the Malaysian Youth Council. He was also the Strategic and Communications Director of BN. His appointment as a deputy minister in December 2023 is rare in Malaysian politics since he was a former federal minister in the Muhyiddin cabinet back in March 2020. This has rarely happened in Malaysian politics. He is one of the three deputy ministers who were previously a federal minister alongside M. Kulasegaran and Noraini Ahmad.

== Election results ==
Parliament of Malaysia
Year	Constituency	Candidate	Votes	Pct	Opponent(s)	Votes	Pct	Ballots cast	Majority	Turnout
2008	P055 Lenggong	Shamsul Anuar Nasarah (UMNO)	10,992	64.41%	Muhd Zulkifli Mohd Zakaria (PAS)	6,073	35.59%	17,436	4,919	75.08%
2013	P055 Lenggong	Shamsul Anuar Nasarah (UMNO)	13,285	57.47%	Razman Zakaria (PAS)	9,832	42.53%	23,736	3,453	84.92%
2018	P055 Lenggong	Shamsul Anuar Nasarah (UMNO)	12,523	53.97%	Muhd Mujahid Mohd Fadzil (PAS)	6,750	29.09%	23,719	5,773	79.72%
2018	P055 Lenggong	Shamsul Anuar Nasarah (UMNO)	12,523	53.97%	Amirul Fairuzzeen Jamaluddin (BERSATU)	3,932	16.94%	23,719	5,773	79.72%
2022	P055 Lenggong	Shamsul Anuar Nasarah (UMNO)	12,588	45.48%	Muhammad Rifaat Razman (PAS)	11,709	42.30%	27,679	879	74.91%
2022	P055 Lenggong	Shamsul Anuar Nasarah (UMNO)	12,588	45.48%	Jurey Latiff Mohd Rosli (PKR)	3,382	12.22%	27,679	879	74.91%

== Honours ==
=== Honours of Malaysia ===
- Malaysia
  - Recipient of the 17th Yang di-Pertuan Agong Installation Medal
  - Medal of the Order of the Defender of the Realm (PPN) (2004)
- Federal Territory (Malaysia)
  - Grand Commander of the Order of the Territorial Crown (SMW) – Datuk Seri (2021)
- Kelantan
  - Knight Commander of the Order of the Life of the Crown of Kelantan (DJMK) – Dato' (2022)
- Perak
  - Knight Commander of the Order of the Perak State Crown (DPMP) – Dato' (2007)
  - Recipient of the Distinguished Conduct Medal (PPT) (2000)
- Selangor
  - Companion of the Order of the Crown of Selangor (SMS) (2005)

== See also ==
- Lenggong (federal constituency)
