= Kuala Selangor (federal constituency) =

Federal constituency of Selangor, Malaysia

Kuala Selangor (P096)
Selangor constituency

Federal constituency
- Legislature: Dewan Rakyat
- MP: Dzulkefly Ahmad; PH
- Constituency created: 1955
- First contested: 1955
- Last contested: 2022

Demographics
- Population (2020): 171,266
- Electors (2023): 105,325
- Area (km²): 434
- Pop. density (per km²): 394.6

Kuala Selangor is a federal constituency in Kuala Selangor District, Selangor, Malaysia, that has been represented in the Dewan Rakyat since 1955.

The federal constituency was created in the 1955 redistribution and is mandated to return a single member to the Dewan Rakyat under the first past the post voting system.

== Demographics ==
Ethnic breakdown of Kuala Selangor's electorate as of 2022
1. Malay (68.7%)
2. Indian (19.0%)
3. Chinese (12.0%)
4. Other ethnicities (0.20%)
Age breakdown of Kuala Selangor's electorate as of 2022
1. 18-20 (7.99%)
2. 21-29 (24.6%)
3. 30-39 (21.8%)
4. 40-49 (16.7%)
5. 50-59 (14.3%)
6. 60-69 (9.06%)
7. 70-79 (4.03%)
8. 80-89 (1.11%)
9. above 90 (0.28%)
Gender breakdown of Kuala Selangor's electorate as of 2022
1. Male (49.5%)
2. Female (50.5%)

== History ==
=== Polling districts ===
According to the federal gazette issued on 18 July 2023, the Kuala Selangor constituency is divided into 37 polling districts.

| State constituency | Polling Districts | Code | Location |
|---|---|---|---|
| Bukit Melawati (N10） | Kuala Selangor | 096/10/01 | SMK Seri Tanjong Kuala Selangor |
| Bukit Melawati (N10） | Bandar Baru | 096/10/02 | SRA Integrasi Bandar Baru Kuala Selangor; SM Sains Kuala Selangor |
| Bukit Melawati (N10） | Asam Jawa | 096/10/03 | SRA Assam Jawa |
| Bukit Melawati (N10） | Kampung Kuantan Kelab | 096/10/04 | SJK (T) Ladang Sungai Buloh |
| Bukit Melawati (N10） | Kampung Kuantan | 096/10/05 | SK Sultan Abdul Aziz Kampung Kuantan |
| Bukit Melawati (N10） | Pasangan | 096/10/06 | SK Pasangan |
| Bukit Melawati (N10） | Ladang Sungai Rambai | 096/10/07 | SJK (T) Selangor River |
| Bukit Melawati (N10） | Bukit Rotan | 096/10/08 | SJK (T) Bukit Rotan Baru |
| Bukit Melawati (N10） | Api-Api | 096/10/09 | SRA Kampung Api-Api |
| Bukit Melawati (N10） | Teluk Piai | 096/10/10 | SRA Bandar Melawati |
| Bukit Melawati (N10） | Bukit Kuching | 096/10/11 | SMK Kampung Bukit Kuching Tengah |
| Bukit Melawati (N10） | Pekan Sungai Buluh | 096/10/12 | SJK (C) Chung Wah Sasaran |
| Bukit Melawati (N10） | Jeram Utara | 096/10/13 | SMA Jeram |
| Bukit Melawati (N10） | Sasaran Jeram | 096/10/14 | SRA Sungai Buloh |
| Ijok (N11） | Sungai Darah | 096/11/01 | SK Rantau Panjang Bestari Jaya |
| Ijok (N11） | Bestari Jaya Selatan | 096/11/02 | SMK Raja Muda Musa Batang Berjuntai |
| Ijok (N11） | Jaya Setia | 096/11/03 | SK Jaya Setia |
| Ijok (N11） | Bukit Badong | 096/11/04 | SK Bukit Badong |
| Ijok (N11） | Kampung Ijok | 096/11/05 | SK Ijok |
| Ijok (N11） | Pekan Ijok | 096/11/06 | SJK (C) Ijok |
| Ijok (N11） | Simpang Ijok | 096/11/07 | SA Rakyat Al-Hilal Spg. Tiga Ijok |
| Ijok (N11） | Bestari Jaya Utara | 096/11/08 | SK Bestari Jaya |
| Ijok (N11） | Ladang Bukit Ijok | 096/11/09 | SJK (T) Ladang Bukit Ijok |
| Ijok (N11） | Parit Mahang | 096/11/10 | SK Parit Mahang |
| Ijok (N11） | Bukit Cherakah | 096/11/11 | SK Dato' Maharaja Lela |
| Jeram（N12） | FELDA Bukit Cherakah | 096/12/01 | SK Bukit Cerakah |
| Jeram（N12） | Bukit Hijau | 096/12/02 | Pejabat JKKK Kampung Bukit Hijau |
| Jeram（N12） | Bukit Kuching Tengah | 096/11/03 | Dewan Orang Ramai Kampung Bukit Kuching Tengah |
| Jeram（N12） | Simpang Tiga | 096/12/04 | SK Jeram |
| Jeram（N12） | Jeram | 096/12/05 | SK Jeram Batu 20 |
| Jeram（N12） | Sungai Sembilang | 096/12/06 | SJK (C) Liat Choon (Pusat) Batu 17 |
| Jeram（N12） | Tambak Jawa | 096/12/07 | SK Tambak Jawa |
| Jeram（N12） | Bukit Cloh | 096/12/08 | SJK (T) Ladang Bukit Cheraka |
| Jeram（N12） | Bukit Kerayong | 096/12/09 | SK Bukit Kerayong |
| Jeram（N12） | Jeram Pantai | 096/12/10 | SRA Pekan Jeram |
| Jeram（N12） | Bandar Puncak Alam | 096/12/11 | SK Puncak Alam 2; SK Puncak Alam 3 |
| Jeram（N12） | Tuan Mee | 096/12/12 | SK Desa Aman Kuala Selangor |

=== Representation history ===
Members of Parliament for Kuala Selangor
| Parliament | No | Years | Member | Party | Vote Share |
Constituency created
Federal Legislative Council
| 1st | | 1955–1959 | Raja Rastam Shahrome Raja Said Tauphy (راج رستم شهرومي راج سعيد تاوڤهي) | Alliance (UMNO) | 11,857; 68.18% |
Parliament of the Federation of Malaya
| 1st | P065 | 1959–1963 | Mohamed Dahari Mohd Ali (محمد داهاري محمد علي) | Alliance (UMNO) | 6,197; 42.97% |
Parliament of Malaysia
| 1st | P065 | 1963–1964 | Mohamed Dahari Mohd Ali (محمد داهاري محمد علي) | Alliance (UMNO) | 6,197; 42.97% |
| 2nd | P065 | 1964–1969 | Raja Rome Raja Ma'amor (راج رومي راج مءامور) | Alliance (UMNO) | 11,684; 72.49% |
| | | 1969–1971 | Parliament was suspended | | |
| 3rd | P065 | 1971–1973 | Raja Nong Chik Raja Ishak (راج نوڠ چيق راج اسحاق) | Alliance (UMNO) | 12,098; 61.03% |
| 3rd | P065 | 1973–1974 | Raja Nong Chik Raja Ishak (راج نوڠ چيق راج اسحاق) | BN (UMNO) | 12,098; 61.03% |
| 4th | P076 | 1974–1978 | Raja Nasron Raja Ishak (راج نصرون راج اسحاق) | BN (UMNO) | 12,291; 65.17% |
| 5th | P076 | 1978–1982 | Abu Hassan Omar (أبو حسن عمر) | BN (UMNO) | 16,598; 70.80% |
| 6th | P076 | 1982–1986 | Abu Hassan Omar (أبو حسن عمر) | BN (UMNO) | 21,409; 79.40% |
| 7th | P085 | 1986–1990 | Abu Hassan Omar (أبو حسن عمر) | BN (UMNO) | 17,523; 78.33% |
| 8th | P085 | 1990–1995 | Abu Hassan Omar (أبو حسن عمر) | BN (UMNO) | 17,964; 67.86% |
| 9th | P089 | 1995–1997 | Abu Hassan Omar (أبو حسن عمر) | BN (UMNO) | 28,287; 85.42% |
| 9th | P089 | 1997–1999 | Jamaluddin Adnan (جمال الدين عدنان) | BN (UMNO) | 24,019; 80.88% |
| 10th | P089 | 1999–2004 | Mohamed Sayuti Said (محمد سايوتي سعيد) | BN (UMNO) | 23,610; 63.30% |
| 11th | P096 | 2004–2008 | Mohd Daud Tarihep (محمد داود تاريهيڤ) | BN (UMNO) | 22,001; 72.51% |
| 12th | P096 | 2008–2013 | Dzulkefly Ahmad (ذوالكفل أحمد) | PR (PAS) | 18,796; 51.17% |
| 13th | P096 | 2013–2018 | Irmohizam Ibrahim (ارم الهيثم إبراهيم) | BN (UMNO) | 27,500; 50.42% |
| 14th | P096 | 2018–2022 | Dzulkefly Ahmad (ذوالكفل أحمد) | PH (AMANAH) | 29,842; 49.97% |
| 15th | P096 | 2022–present | Dzulkefly Ahmad (ذوالكفل أحمد) | PH (AMANAH) | 31,033; 35.88% |

=== State constituency ===
| Parliamentary constituency | State constituency | | | | | | |
| Parliamentary constituency | 1955–59* | 1959–1974 | 1974–1986 | 1986–1995 | 1995–2004 | 2004–2018 | 2018–present |
|---|---|---|---|---|---|---|---|
| Kuala Selangor | | | Asam Jawa | | | | |
| Kuala Selangor | | | | | | Bukit Melawati | |
| Kuala Selangor | | | | | Ijok | | |
| Kuala Selangor | | | Jeram | | Jeram | | |
| Kuala Selangor | Kuala Selangor | | | | | | |
| Kuala Selangor | | Kuala Selangor Pekan | | | | | |
| Kuala Selangor | | | Permatang | | | | |
| Kuala Selangor | | | | Seri Cahaya | | | |
| Kuala Selangor | | | | Sungai Tinggi | | | |
| Kuala Selangor | | Tanjong Karang | | | | | |

=== Historical boundaries ===
| State Constituency | Area | | | | | |
| State Constituency | 1959 | 1974 | 1984 | 1994 | 2003 | 2018 |
|---|---|---|---|---|---|---|
| Asam Jawa | | Batang Berjuntai; Bukit Melawati; Ijok; Kampung Kuantan; Kuala Selangor | | | | |
| Bukit Melawati | | | | | Assam Jawa; Bukit Melawati; Bukit Rotan; Kampung Kuantan; Kuala Selangor | Assam Jawa; Bukit Jeram; Bukit Rotan; Kuala Selangor; Sasaran |
| Ijok | | | | Bandar Seri Coalfields; Batang Berjuntai; Bukit Rotan; Ijok; Ladang Sungai Tinggi | Bandar Seri Coalfields; Bestari Jaya; Bukit Badong; Bukit Cherakah; Ijok | Bestari Jaya; Bukit Badong; Bukit Cherakah; Ijok; Parit Mahang |
| Jeram | | Jeram; Puncak Alam; Sasaran; Simpang Tiga; Sungai Sembilang | | Bandar Saujana Utama; Jeram; Parit Mahang; Puncak Alam; Sasaran | | Alam Perdana; Bandar Seri Coalfields; Jeram; Puncak Alam; Simpang Tiga |
| Kuala Selangor Pekan | Assam Jawa; Kuala Selangor; Ijok; Pasir Penambang; Puncak Alam | | | | | |
| Permatang | | Kampung Bukit Belimbing; Kampung Rantau Panjang; Kampung Seri Tiram Jaya; Pasir Penambang; Terusan Utama | Bukit Melawati; Kampung Kuantan; Kampung Parit Serong; Kuala Selangor; Pasir Penambang | Assam Jawa; Bukit Melawati; Kuala Selangor; Pasir Penambang; Pasir Tuntong | | |
| Seri Cahaya | | | Assam Jawa; Batang Berjuntai; Bukit Rotan; Ijok; Pasir Tuntong | | | |
| Sungai Tinggi | | | Kampung Rantau Panjang; Kampung Sungai Tiram Jaya; Sungai Tinggi; Taman Gembira; Terusan Utama | | | |
| Tanjong Karang | Kampung Seri Tiram Jaya; Kampung Sungai Kajang; Sekinchan; Sungai Sireh; Tanjong Karang | | | | | |

=== Current state assembly members ===
| No. | State Constituency | Member | Coalition (Party) |
|---|---|---|---|
| N10 | Bukit Melawati | Noorazley Yahya | PN (BERSATU) |
| N11 | Ijok | Jefri Mejan | PN (PAS) |
| N12 | Jeram | Harrison Hassan | PN (BERSATU) |

=== Local governments & postcodes ===
| No. | State Constituency | Local Government | Postcode |
|---|---|---|---|
| N10 | Bukit Melawati | Kuala Selangor Municipal Councii | 42300 Puncak Alam; 45000 Kuala Selangor; 45600 Tanjong Karang; 45600, 45609, 45620 Bestari Jaya; 45700 Bukit Rotan; 45800 Jeram; 47000 Sungai Buloh |
| N11 | Ijok | Kuala Selangor Municipal Councii | 42300 Puncak Alam; 45000 Kuala Selangor; 45600 Tanjong Karang; 45600, 45609, 45620 Bestari Jaya; 45700 Bukit Rotan; 45800 Jeram; 47000 Sungai Buloh |
| N12 | Jeram | Kuala Selangor Municipal Councii | 42300 Puncak Alam; 45000 Kuala Selangor; 45600 Tanjong Karang; 45600, 45609, 45620 Bestari Jaya; 45700 Bukit Rotan; 45800 Jeram; 47000 Sungai Buloh |

== Election results ==
Malaysian general election, 2022
| Party | Candidate | Votes | % | ∆% |
|---|---|---|---|---|
| PH | Dzulkefly Ahmad | 31,033 | 35.88 | ▲35.88 |
| BN | Tengku Zafrul Aziz | 30,031 | 34.73 | ▼1.01 |
| PN | Mohd Noor Mohd Sahar | 23,639 | 27.33 | ▲27.33 |
| PEJUANG | Mohd Shaid Rosli | 1,778 | 2.06 | ▲2.06 |
| Total valid votes | | 86,481 | 100.00 | |
| Total rejected ballots | | 1,072 | | |
| Unreturned ballots | | 132 | | |
| Turnout | | 87,685 | 84.00 | ▼3.67 |
| Registered electors | | 102,951 | | |
| Majority | | 1,002 | 1.15 | ▼12.85 |
| PH hold | | Swing | | |
Source(s) https://lom.agc.gov.my/ilims/upload/portal/akta/outputp/1753283/PUB612.pdf

Malaysian general election, 2018
| Party | Candidate | Votes | % | ∆% |
|---|---|---|---|---|
| PKR | Dzulkefly Ahmad | 29,842 | 49.97 | ▲49.97 |
| BN | Irmohizam Ibrahim | 21,344 | 35.74 | ▼19.62 |
| PAS | Mohd Fakaruddin Ismail | 8,535 | 14.29 | ▼37.28 |
| Total valid votes | | 59,721 | 100.00 | |
| Total rejected ballots | | 996 | | |
| Unreturned ballots | | 126 | | |
| Turnout | | 60,843 | 87.67 | ▼1.54 |
| Registered electors | | 69,397 | | |
| Majority | | 8,498 | 14.00 | ▲13.16 |
| PKR gain from BN | | Swing | | ? |
Source(s) "His Majesty's Government Gazette - Notice of Contested Election, Parliament for the State of Selangor [P.U. (B) 239/2018]" (PDF). Attorney General's Chambers of Malaysia. 3 May 2018. Archived from the original (PDF) on 2019-07-19. "Federal Government Gazette - Results of Contested Election and Statements of the Poll after the Official Addition of Votes, Parliamentary Constituencies for the State of Selangor [P.U. (B) 313/2018]" (PDF). Attorney General's Chambers of Malaysia. 28 May 2018. Archived from the original (PDF) on 2019-07-19.

Malaysian general election, 2013
| Party | Candidate | Votes | % | ∆% |
|---|---|---|---|---|
| BN | Irmohizam Ibrahim | 27,500 | 50.42 | ▲1.59 |
| PAS | Dzulkefly Ahmad | 27,040 | 49.58 | ▼1.59 |
| Total valid votes | | 54,540 | 100.00 | |
| Total rejected ballots | | 934 | | |
| Unreturned ballots | | 118 | | |
| Turnout | | 55,592 | 89.24 | ▲9.43 |
| Registered electors | | 62,298 | | |
| Majority | | 460 | 0.84 | ▼1.50 |
| BN gain from PAS | | Swing | | ? |
Source(s) "Federal Government Gazette - Notice of Contested Election, Parliament for the State of Selangor [P.U. (B) 176/2013]" (PDF). Attorney General's Chambers of Malaysia. 26 April 2013. Archived from the original (PDF) on 2018-09-30. "Federal Government Gazette - Results of Contested Election and Statements of the Poll after the Official Addition of Votes, Parliamentary Constituencies for the State of Selangor [P.U. (B) 217/2013]" (PDF). Attorney General's Chambers of Malaysia. 22 May 2013. Archived from the original (PDF) on 2018-09-30.

Malaysian general election, 2008
| Party | Candidate | Votes | % | ∆% |
|---|---|---|---|---|
| PAS | Dzulkefly Ahmad | 18,796 | 51.17 | ▲51.17 |
| BN | Jahaya Ibrahim | 17,934 | 48.83 | ▼23.68 |
| Total valid votes | | 36,730 | 100.00 | |
| Total rejected ballots | | 894 | | |
| Unreturned ballots | | 47 | | |
| Turnout | | 37,671 | 79.81 | ▲4.94 |
| Registered electors | | 47,203 | | |
| Majority | | 862 | 2.34 | ▼42.68 |
| PAS gain from BN | | Swing | | ? |

Malaysian general election, 2004
| Party | Candidate | Votes | % | ∆% |
|---|---|---|---|---|
| BN | Mohd Daud Tarihep | 22,001 | 72.51 | ▲9.21 |
| PKR | Raja Kamaruddin Raja Ab Wahid | 8,339 | 27.49 | ▲27.49 |
| Total valid votes | | 30,340 | 100.00 | |
| Total rejected ballots | | 866 | | |
| Unreturned ballots | | 25 | | |
| Turnout | | 31,231 | 74.87 | ▲1.65 |
| Registered electors | | 41,713 | | |
| Majority | | 13,662 | 45.02 | ▲18.42 |
| BN hold | | Swing | | |

Malaysian general election, 1999
| Party | Candidate | Votes | % | ∆% |
|---|---|---|---|---|
| BN | Mohamed Sayuti Said | 23,610 | 63.30 | ▼17.58 |
| PAS | Mohd Norman Toha | 13,690 | 36.70 | ▲17.58 |
| Total valid votes | | 37,300 | 100.00 | |
| Total rejected ballots | | 1,098 | | |
| Unreturned ballots | | 23 | | |
| Turnout | | 38,421 | 73.22 | ▲11.13 |
| Registered electors | | 52,227 | | |
| Majority | | 9,920 | 26.60 | ▼35.16 |
| BN hold | | Swing | | |

Malaysian general by-election, 29 May 1997 Upon the resignation of incumbent, Abu Hassan Omar
| Party | Candidate | Votes | % | ∆% |
|---|---|---|---|---|
| BN | Jamaluddin Adnan | 24,019 | 80.88 | ▼4.54 |
| PAS | Ahmad Alang | 5,677 | 19.12 | ▲19.12 |
| Total valid votes | | 29,696 | 100.00 | |
| Total rejected ballots | | 1,053 | | |
| Unreturned ballots | | 0 | | |
| Turnout | | 30,749 | 62.09 | ▼8.79 |
| Registered electors | | 49,527 | | |
| Majority | | 18,342 | 61.76 | ▼9.08 |
| BN hold | | Swing | | |

Malaysian general election, 1995
| Party | Candidate | Votes | % | ∆% |
|---|---|---|---|---|
| BN | Abu Hassan Omar | 28,287 | 85.42 | ▲17.56 |
| S46 | Amin Hussaini Abdul Manan | 4,827 | 14.58 | ▼17.56 |
| Total valid votes | | 33,114 | 100.00 | |
| Total rejected ballots | | 2,035 | | |
| Unreturned ballots | | 98 | | |
| Turnout | | 35,247 | 70.88 | ▼4.14 |
| Registered electors | | 49,727 | | |
| Majority | | 23,460 | 70.84 | ▲35.12 |
| BN hold | | Swing | | |

Malaysian general election, 1990
| Party | Candidate | Votes | % | ∆% |
|---|---|---|---|---|
| BN | Abu Hassan Omar | 17,964 | 67.86 | ▼10.47 |
| S46 | Mohamed Haniffa | 8,508 | 32.14 | ▲32.14 |
| Total valid votes | | 26,472 | 100.00 | |
| Total rejected ballots | | 1,055 | | |
| Unreturned ballots | | 0 | | |
| Turnout | | 27,527 | 75.02 | ▲2.83 |
| Registered electors | | 36,695 | | |
| Majority | | 9,456 | 35.72 | ▼20.94 |
| BN hold | | Swing | | |

Malaysian general election, 1986
| Party | Candidate | Votes | % | ∆% |
|---|---|---|---|---|
| BN | Abu Hassan Omar | 17,523 | 78.33 | ▼1.07 |
| NASMA | Zainudin Muhammad | 4,847 | 21.67 | ▼21.67 |
| Total valid votes | | 22,370 | 100.00 | |
| Total rejected ballots | | 1,099 | | |
| Unreturned ballots | | 0 | | |
| Turnout | | 23,469 | 72.19 | ▼2.35 |
| Registered electors | | 32,510 | | |
| Majority | | 12,676 | 56.66 | ▼11.21 |
| BN hold | | Swing | | |

Malaysian general election, 1982
| Party | Candidate | Votes | % | ∆% |
|---|---|---|---|---|
| BN | Abu Hassan Omar | 21,409 | 79.40 | ▲8.60 |
| DAP | Abdul Rashid Daud | 3,110 | 11.53 | ▲11.53 |
| PAS | Sayan Marbin | 2,444 | 9.06 | ▼6.25 |
| Total valid votes | | 26,963 | 100.00 | |
| Total rejected ballots | | 1,050 | | |
| Unreturned ballots | | 0 | | |
| Turnout | | 28,013 | 74.54 | ▼0.53 |
| Registered electors | | 37,579 | | |
| Majority | | 18,299 | 67.87 | ▲9.38 |
| BN hold | | Swing | | |

Malaysian general election, 1978
| Party | Candidate | Votes | % | ∆% |
|---|---|---|---|---|
| BN | Abu Hassan Omar | 16,598 | 70.80 | ▲5.63 |
| PAS | Norhadi Hasan Ali | 3,590 | 15.31 | ▲15.31 |
| Independent | Supian Sirman | 3,257 | 13.89 | ▲13.89 |
| Total valid votes | | 23,445 | 100.00 | |
| Total rejected ballots | | 1,303 | | |
| Unreturned ballots | | 0 | | |
| Turnout | | 24,748 | 74.97 | ▼0.03 |
| Registered electors | | 33,012 | | |
| Majority | | 13,008 | 55.49 | ▲25.15 |
| BN hold | | Swing | | |

Malaysian general election, 1974
| Party | Candidate | Votes | % | ∆% |
|---|---|---|---|---|
| BN | Raja Nasron Raja Ishak | 12,291 | 65.17 | ▲65.17 |
| Independent | Hashim Mahmood | 6,568 | 34.83 | ▲34.83 |
| Total valid votes | | 18,859 | 100.00 | |
| Total rejected ballots | | 1,615 | | |
| Unreturned ballots | | 0 | | |
| Turnout | | 20,474 | 75.00 | ▼7.29 |
| Registered electors | | 27,578 | | |
| Majority | | 5,723 | 30.34 | ▲8.28 |
| BN gain from Alliance | | Swing | | ? |

Malaysian general election, 1969
| Party | Candidate | Votes | % | ∆% |
|---|---|---|---|---|
| Alliance | Raja Nong Chik Raja Ishak | 12,098 | 61.03 | ▼11.46 |
| PMIP | Mohamed Dali Muin | 7,724 | 38.97 | ▲38.97 |
| Total valid votes | | 19,822 | 100.00 | |
| Total rejected ballots | | 2,680 | | |
| Unreturned ballots | | 0 | | |
| Turnout | | 22,502 | 82.29 | ▲12.15 |
| Registered electors | | 27,344 | | |
| Majority | | 4,374 | 22.06 | ▼22.92 |
| Alliance hold | | Swing | | |

Malaysian general election, 1964
| Party | Candidate | Votes | % | ∆% |
|---|---|---|---|---|
| Alliance | Raja Rome Raja Ma'amor | 11,684 | 72.49 | ▲29.52 |
| Socialist Front | Kampo Radjo | 4,435 | 27.51 | ▲27.51 |
| Total valid votes | | 16,119 | 100.00 | |
| Total rejected ballots | | 1,333 | | |
| Unreturned ballots | | 0 | | |
| Turnout | | 17,452 | 70.14 | ▼6.51 |
| Registered electors | | 24,882 | | |
| Majority | | 7,249 | 44.98 | ▲31.25 |
| Alliance hold | | Swing | | |

Malayan general election, 1959
| Party | Candidate | Votes | % | ∆% |
|---|---|---|---|---|
| Alliance | Mohamed Dahari Mohd Ali | 6,197 | 42.97 | ▼25.21 |
| PMIP | Abdullah Mat Junan | 4,216 | 29.24 | ▲1.77 |
| Malayan Party | N. Manickam | 4,008 | 27.79 | ▲27.79 |
| Total valid votes | | 14,421 | 100.00 | |
| Total rejected ballots | | 163 | | |
| Unreturned ballots | | 0 | | |
| Turnout | | 14,584 | 76.65 | ▼6.15 |
| Registered electors | | 19,026 | | |
| Majority | | 1,981 | 13.73 | ▼26.98 |
| Alliance hold | | Swing | | |

Malayan general election, 1955
| Party | Candidate | Votes | % |
|---|---|---|---|
| Alliance | Raja Rastan Shahrome | 11,857 | 68.18 |
| PMIP | Othman Abdullah | 4,778 | 27.47 |
| National Party | Mohd Ambia Sanusi | 756 | 4.35 |
| Total valid votes | | 17,391 | 100.00 |
| Total rejected ballots | | | |
| Unreturned ballots | | | |
| Turnout | | 17,391 | 82.80 |
| Registered electors | | 21,003 | |
| Majority | | 7,079 | 40.71 |
This was a new constituency created.
Source(s): The Straits Times.
