= Amiruddin Setro =

Malaysian politician

Yang Berbahagia Dato' Amiruddin Setro DPMS ASA
- اميرالدين سيترو

Member of the Selangor State Legislative Assembly for Jeram
- In office 21 March 2004 – 9 May 2018
- Preceded by: Mesrah Selamat (BN–UMNO)
- Succeeded by: Mohd Shaid Rosli (PH–BERSATU)
- Majority: 5,527 (2004); 1,476 (2008); 2,834 (2013)

Personal details
- Born: 27 July 1960 (age 65) Selangor, Federation of Malaya
- Party: United Malays National Organisation (UMNO)
- Other political affiliations: Barisan Nasional (BN)

Amiruddin bin Setro is a Malaysian politician who served as Member of the Selangor State Legislative Assembly (MLA) for Jeram from March 2004 to May 2018. He is a member of United Malays National Organisation (UMNO), a component party of Barisan Nasional (BN) coalitions.

== Election results ==
Selangor State Legislative Assembly
Year	Constituency	Candidate	Votes	Pct	Opponent(s)	Votes	Pct	Ballots cast	Majority	Turnout
2004	N12 Jeram	Amiruddin Setro (UMNO)	9,114	71.76%	Kamal Ashaari (PAS)	3,587	28.24%	13,015	5,527	77.07%
2008	N12 Jeram	Amiruddin Setro (UMNO)	8,209	54.94%	Hairi Darmo (PAS)	6,733	45.06%	15,281	1,476	81.11%
2013	N12 Jeram	Amiruddin Setro (UMNO)	13,632	55.80%	Muhmmad Rashid Muhmmad Kassim (PAS)	10,798	44.20%	24,841	2,834	90.20%

== Honours ==
- Selangor
  - Knight Commander of the Order of the Crown of Selangor (DPMS) – Dato' (2005)
  - Member of the Order of Sultan Salahuddin Abdul Aziz Shah (ASA) (1999)
