= Mohd Shaid Rosli =

Malaysian politician

- محمد سعيد رسلي

Member of the Selangor State Legislative Assembly for Jeram
- In office 9 May 2018 – 12 August 2023
- Preceded by: Amiruddin Setro (BN–UMNO)
- Succeeded by: Harrison Hassan (PN–BERSATU)
- Majority: 1,191 (2018)

Faction represented in Selangor State Legislative Assembly
- 2018–2020: Pakatan Harapan
- 2020: Malaysian United Indigenous Party
- 2020–2021: Independent
- 2021–2023: Homeland Fighters Party

Personal details
- Born: Mohd Shaid bin Rosli; 15 July 1982 (age 43) Hulu Bernam, Selangor, Malaysia
- Citizenship: Malaysian
- Party: Malaysian United Indigenous Party (BERSATU) (–2020); Independent (2020, 2023-); Homeland Fighters Party (PEJUANG) (2020-2023)
- Other political affiliations: Pakatan Harapan (PH) (2018–2020)
- Occupation: Politician

Mohd Shaid bin Rosli is a Malaysian politician who served as Member of the Selangor State Legislative Assembly (MLA) for Jeram from May 2018 to August 2023. He was a member of the Homeland Fighters Party (PEJUANG) and Malaysian United Indigenous Party (BERSATU), a component party of the Perikatan Nasional (PN) coalition and formerly Pakatan Harapan (PH) coalitions.

== Political career ==
Mohd Shaid initially contested for Jeram state seat of Selangor in 2018 Selangor state election representing BERSATU and PH. He went on to win the state by defeating two opponents Zahar Azlan Ariffin from Barisan Nasional (BN) and United Malays National Organisation (UMNO) and Mohd Noor Mohd Shahar from Malaysian Islamic Party (PAS) with a total of 7,087 votes and a majority of 1,191 votes.

On 8 August 2020, he left BERSATU and PN and declared that he would choose to work together with the former Prime Minister and former BERSATU Chairman Mahathir Mohamad who was expelled from BERSATU due to political differences with then Prime Minister Muhyiddin Yassin and BERSATU President who brought BERSATU out of PH and formed PN government as Mahathir opposed PN government by joining PEJUANG.

== Election results ==
Selangor State Legislative Assembly
Year	Constituency	Candidate	Votes	Pct	Opponent(s)	Votes	Pct	Ballots cast	Majority	Turnout
2018	N12 Jeram	Mohd Shaid Rosli (BERSATU)	7,087	40.95%	Zahar Azlan Arifin (UMNO)	5,896	34.06%	17,534	1,191	88.80%
2018	N12 Jeram	Mohd Shaid Rosli (BERSATU)	7,087	40.95%	Mohd Noor Mohd Shahar (PAS)	4,326	24.99%	17,534	1,191	88.80%

Parliament of Malaysia
Year	Constituency	Candidate	Votes	Pct	Opponent(s)	Votes	Pct	Ballots cast	Majority	Turnout
2022	P096 Kuala Selangor	Mohd Shaid Rosli (PEJUANG)	1,778	2.06%	Dzulkefly Ahmad (AMANAH)	31,033	35.88%	86,481	1,002	84.00%
2022	P096 Kuala Selangor	Mohd Shaid Rosli (PEJUANG)	1,778	2.06%	Tengku Zafrul Aziz (UMNO)	30,031	34.73%	86,481	1,002	84.00%
2022	P096 Kuala Selangor	Mohd Shaid Rosli (PEJUANG)	1,778	2.06%	Mohd Noor Mohd Sahar (PAS)	23,639	27.33%	86,481	1,002	84.00%
