= 2011 Kerdau by-election =

Election in Malaysia

- 26 February 2011

Kerdau seat in the Pahang State Legislative Assembly
	BN	PAS
Candidate	Syed Ibrahim Syed Ahmad	Hassanuddin Salim
Party	BN (UMNO)	PAS
Alliance		PR
Popular vote	5,060	2,336
Percentage	68.42%	31.58%
Kerdau assemblyman before election
Zaharuddin Abu Kassim
BN (UMNO)
Elected Kerdau assemblyman
Syed Ibrahim Syed Ahmad
BN (UMNO)

The 2011 Kerdau by-election is a state by-election that was scheduled held on 6 March 2011 in the state of Pahang, Malaysia. The nomination of candidates was done on 26 February 2011. The Kerdau seat fell vacant following the death of its state assemblyman Datuk Zaharuddin Abu Kassim of United Malays National Organisation, part of the Barisan Nasional coalition from a heart attack at his home. Previously Zaharuddin Abu Kassim won the Kerdau seat with a 1,615 vote majority, beating PAS' Hassanuddin Salim at the 2008 Malaysian general elections. The state assembly seat has 8,721 voters registered compromising of 88.36% Malays, 3.6% Chinese, 3.4% Indians and 2.98% other races. For the by-election PAS picked as its candidate, Hassanuddin Salim while Barisan Nasional picked Syed Ibrahim Syed Ahmad.

== Results ==
Syed Ibrahim Syed Ahmad, the Barisan candidate won by polling 5,060 votes against the 2,336 garnered by Hassanuddin Salim of PAS.

Pahang state by-election, 6 March 2011: Kerdau The by-election was called due to the death of incumbent, Zaharuddin Abu Kassim.
Party	Candidate	Votes	%	∆%
BN	Syed Ibrahim Syed Ahmad	5,060	68.42	
PAS	Hassanuddin Salim	2,336	31.58	
Total valid votes		7,396	100.00	
Total rejected ballots		90		
Unreturned ballots		1		
Turnout		7,487	83.20	
Registered electors		8,999		
Majority		2,724		
BN hold		Swing		
Source(s) "Pilihan Raya Kecil N.28 Kerdau". Election Commission of Malaysia.
