= Harrison Hassan =

Malaysian politician

Yang Berhormat Dato' Harrison Hassan DIMP MLA
- حَارِصُون حَسَّان

Member of the Supreme Council of the Malaysian United Indigenous Party
- Incumbent
- Assumed office 18 January 2025
- President: Muhyiddin Yassin

Member of the Selangor State Legislative Assembly for Jeram
- Incumbent
- Assumed office 12 August 2023
- Preceded by: Mohd Shaid Rosli (PH–BERSATU)
- Majority: 5,398 (2023)

Personal details
- Born: Harrison bin Hassan
- Citizenship: Malaysian
- Party: United Malays National Organisation (UMNO) (until 2023); Malaysian United Indigenous Party (BERSATU) (since 2023)
- Other political affiliations: Barisan Nasional (BN) (until 2023); Perikatan Nasional (PN) (since 2023)
- Occupation: Politician

Harrison bin Hassan is a Malaysian politician who has served as Member of the Selangor State Legislative Assembly (MLA) for Jeram since August 2023. He is a member and the Division Chief of Kuala Selangor of the Malaysian United Indigenous Party (BERSATU), a component party of the Perikatan Nasional (PN) coalition and was a member, Deputy Division Chief of Sungai Buloh and Youth Organising Secretary of the United Malays National Organisation (UMNO), a component party of the Barisan Nasional (BN) coalition. He has served as Member of the Supreme Council of BERSATU since January 2025.

== Political career ==
=== Member of the Selangor State Legislative Assembly (since 2023) ===
==== 2023 Selangor state election ====
In the 2023 Selangor state election, Harrison made his electoral debut after being nominated by PN to contest the Jeram state seat. Harrison won the seat and was elected to the Selangor State Legislative Assembly as the Jeram MLA for the first term after defeating Jahaya Ibrahim of BN by a majority of 5,398 votes.

During the campaigning period, former Minister of Health and former UMNO Youth Chief Khairy Jamaluddin appeared to help Harrison and spent time with Harrison during a meet-and-greet session with Jeram voters. He supported Harrison as the latter was his friend and colleague in UMNO Youth and added that it was the right time for Harrison to contest in elections. He also cited the experience, knowledge, hardworking and realistic behaviour of Hassan that would make him an excellent Jeram MLA.

== Controversies and issues ==
=== Being sacked from UMNO and joining BERSATU ===
On 28 July 2023, Deputy Prime Minister, BN Chairman and UMNO President Ahmad Zahid Hamidi announced the automatic termination of Hassan as an UMNO Member after the latter was announced as a candidate representing PN and BERSATU, of which UMNO was a political enemy. Ahmad Zahid also said that UMNO needed members who were loyal to the party and not those who were not as well as responding unsurprisingly due to his earlier knowledge of his defection. In response, Harrison said his decision of switching party was based on the demands of the people who wanted political changes although he was labelled as a 'traitor'. He further stated that he struggled sincerely without any forces or pressures and did not forcefully follow any idols. He further defended his move by claiming that BN and UMNO were still in old politics while he was not.

== Personal life ==
=== Idolising Hishammuddin Hussein ===
He idolised the Member of Parliament (MP) for Sembrong Hishammuddin Hussein whom he previously worked with in the Ministry of Defence. He shared that Hishammuddin was shocked and positive of learning the news of him contesting elections and hugged him.

=== Health ===
During his late campaigning period, Harrison was forced to use a crutch after suffering swelling in his ankle. His injury however did not stop him from going down to the ground to meet the voters. He attributed it to possibly walking too much during the period. He described it as a test for him as he was determined to visit all 13 polling stations in Jeram and to meet as many voters as possible.

== Election results ==
Selangor State Legislative Assembly
Year	Constituency	Candidate	Votes	Pct	Opponent(s)	Votes	Pct	Ballots cast	Majority	Turnout
2023	N12 Jeram	Harrison Hassan (BERSATU)	16,731	59.62%	Jahaya Ibrahim (UMNO)	11,333	40.38%	28,064	5,398	76.45%

== Honours ==
- Pahang
  - Knight Companion of the Order of the Crown of Pahang (DIMP) – Dato' (2012)
