= Abu Hassan Omar =

Malaysian politician

Yang Berbahagia Tan Sri Dato' Seri Abu Hassan Omar PSM SPMS SUMW DPMS SMT AMN PIS
- أبو حسن عمر

12th Menteri Besar of Selangor
- In office 6 June 1997 – 9 August 2000
- Monarch: Sultan Salahuddin Abdul Aziz Shah
- Preceded by: Muhammad Muhammad Taib
- Succeeded by: Khir Toyo

Ministerial roles
- 1978–1980: Parliamentary Secretary of Trade and Industry
- 1980–1982: Deputy Minister of Defence
- 1982–1984: Deputy Minister of Transport
- 1984–1986: Minister of Social Welfare
- 1986–1987: Minister of Federal Territories
- 1987–1992: Minister of Foreign Affairs
- 1992–1997: Minister of Domestic Trade and Consumer Affairs

Faction represented in Dewan Rakyat
- 1978–1997: Barisan Nasional

Faction represented in Selangor State Legislative Assembly
- 1997–2004: Barisan Nasional

Personal details
- Born: Abu Hassan bin Omar; 15 September 1940 Kuala Selangor, Selangor, Federated Malay States, British Malaya (now Malaysia)
- Died: 8 September 2018 (aged 77) Shah Alam, Selangor, Malaysia
- Resting place: Royal Mausoleum, Shah Alam, Selangor
- Party: United Malays National Organisation (UMNO)
- Other political affiliations: Barisan Nasional (BN)
- Spouse: Wan Nor Daud
- Children: 5
- Education: Malay College Kuala Kangsar; University of Hull
- Occupation: Politician, civil servant

Abu Hassan bin Omar (Jawi: أبو حسن بن عمر; 15 September 1940 – 8 September 2018) was a Malaysian politician from United Malays National Organisation (UMNO), a major component party of Barisan Nasional (BN) coalition. He was the 12th Menteri Besar (Chief Minister) of Selangor, Malaysia, from 1997 to 2000. Previously he was also the Minister of Social Welfare (1984–1986), Minister of Federal Territories (1986–1987), Minister of Foreign Affairs (1987–1992) and Minister of Domestic Trade and Consumer Affairs (1992–1997). He was also a former Member of Parliament for Kuala Selangor (1978–1997) and Selangor state assemblyman for Permatang (1997–2004) in Selangor.

== Early life ==
Abu Hassan was born on 15 September 1940 in Bukit Belimbing, Kuala Selangor, Selangor. He received his early education at the Malay School of Bukit Belimbing (1946–1950) before furthering his studies at Klang High School (1951–1957), Malay College Kuala Kangsar (1958–1959) and University of Hull, England (1960–1963 and 1971–1973). Abu Hassan was married to Wan Nor Daud and the couple had five children.

Before entering politics, he served as the Administrative and Diplomatic Officer (PTD) from 1964 to 1978. He previously served as Chief Assistant Secretary of Economy Planning Unit in the Prime Minister's department, Assistant Secretary of Selangor State Government and Assistant Secretary of the Land and Federal Territory Development Ministry.

== Political career ==
Abu Hassan started his political career when he contested and won the Kuala Selangor parliamentary seat in the 1978 general election on 8 July 1978. He successfully retained the seat in the subsequent 1982, 1986, 1990 and 1995 general elections. In Mahathir Mohamad's government, he was also the Minister of Social Welfare (1984–1986), Minister of Federal Territories (1986–1987), Minister of Foreign Affairs (1987–1992) and Minister of Domestic Trade and Consumer Affairs (1992–1997).

On 30 April 1997, he resigned as Member of Parliament for Kuala Selangor and his cabinet minister post in order to contest the Selangor state seat of Permatang which fell vacant when its incumbent assemblyman, Jamaluddin Adnan also resigned. This arranged position swap occurred to enable him to be appointed the new Selangor Menteri Besar, to replace Muhammad Muhammad Taib who stepped down over currency irregularities court charges and controversies.

=== Menteri Besar of Selangor ===
After being elected as a representative of the Selangor State Legislative Assembly in the by-election on 29 May 1997, he was appointed the Menteri Besar of Selangor from 6 June 1997 to 9 August 2000. There was controversy over the RM5 million expenditure to renovate the official residence of the Menteri Besar at Bukit Megawati, Shah Alam for Abu Hassan during his tenure.

In 2000, a poison pen letter started circulating about an alleged sex scandal and ill-concealed relationship between Abu Hassan with his wife's sister. Abu Hassan had denied any wrongdoing, claiming his sister-in-law actually had married his good friend, a Chinese new Muslim convert (Muallaf) who coincidentally shared his Islamic name; Abu Hassan Tan Abdullah. He stated that as the reason their son's name was Mohamad Hafiz bin Abu Hassan, which had caused all the confusion. The opposition had reported the case to the Selangor Islamic Religious Department (JAIS) demanding an investigation into their relationship and if they have an illegitimate son under religious law.

On 10 August 2000, Abu Hassan abruptly announced his resignation as Menteri Besar of Selangor citing health and family reasons but did not elaborate on other existing controversies and crisis bothering him.

== Death ==
Abu Hassan died of a cardiac arrest on 8 September 2018 at 8.05pm at the Columbia Asia Hospital, Bukit Rimau, aged 77. Abu Hassan's remains were brought to his residence at Kota Kemuning, Shah Alam before brought to the Sultan Salahuddin Abdul Aziz Mosque, Shah Alam for prayers and then burial at Shah Alam Royal Mausoleum, Shah Alam, Selangor on the next day. Sultan Selangor, Sultan Sharafuddin Idris Shah and Tengku Permaisuri Selangor, Tengku Permaisuri Norashikin attended the ceremony.

== Election results ==
Parliament of Malaysia
Year	Constituency	Candidate	Votes	Pct	Opponent(s)	Votes	Pct	Ballots cast	Majority	Turnout
1978	P076 Kuala Selangor	Abu Hassan Omar (UMNO)	16,598	70.80%	Norhadi Hasan Ali (PAS)	3,590	15.31%	N/A	13,008	N/A
1978	P076 Kuala Selangor	Abu Hassan Omar (UMNO)	16,598	70.80%	Supian Sirman (IND)	3,257	13.89%	N/A	13,008	N/A
1982	P076 Kuala Selangor	Abu Hassan Omar (UMNO)	21,409	79.40%	Abd Rashid Daud (DAP)	3,110	11.53%	28,013	18,299	74.54%
1982	P076 Kuala Selangor	Abu Hassan Omar (UMNO)	21,409	79.40%	Sayan Marbin (PAS)	2,444	9.06%	28,013	18,299	74.54%
1986	P085 Kuala Selangor	Abu Hassan Omar (UMNO)	17,523	78.33%	Zainudin Muhammad (NASMA)	4,847	21.67%	23,469	12,676	72.19%
1990	P085 Kuala Selangor	Abu Hassan Omar (UMNO)	17,964	67.86%	Mohamed Haniffa (S46)	8,508	32.14%	27,527	9,456	75.02%
1995	P089 Kuala Selangor	Abu Hassan Omar (UMNO)	28,287	85.42%	Amin Hussaini Abd Manan (S46)	4,827	14.58%	11,884	23,460	70.88%

Selangor State Legislative Assembly
Year	Constituency	Candidate	Votes	Pct	Opponent(s)	Votes	Pct	Ballots cast	Majority	Turnout
1997	N10 Permatang	Abu Hassan Omar (UMNO)	9,590	84.12%	Mohd Maskuri Mardzuki (PAS)	1,810	15.88%	11,884	7,780	64.18%
1999	N10 Permatang	Abu Hassan Omar (UMNO)	8,621	60.35%	Mohd Yahya Mat Sahri (KeADILan)	5,665	39.65%	14,755	2,956	73.72%

== Honours ==
=== Honours of Malaysia ===
- Malaysia
  - Commander of the Order of Loyalty to the Crown of Malaysia (PSM) – Tan Sri (2004)
  - Member of the Order of the Defender of the Realm (AMN) (1975)
- Federal Territory (Malaysia)
  - Grand Knight of the Order of the Territorial Crown (SUMW) – Datuk Seri Utama (2012)
- Johor
  - Recipient of the Sultan Ibrahim Medal (PIS)
- Selangor
  - Knight Grand Commander of the Order of the Crown of Selangor (SPMS) – Dato' Seri (1988)
  - Knight Commander of the Order of the Crown of Selangor (DPMS) – Dato' (1981)
- Terengganu
  - Companion of the Order of the Crown of Terengganu (SMT)

=== Foreign Honours ===
- Peru
  - Grand Cross of the Order of the Sun of Peru (1989)
- South Korea
  - Gwanghwa Medal of the Order of Diplomatic Service Merit (1988)
- Thailand
  - Knight Grand Cross (First Class) of the Most Exalted Order of the White Elephant (KCE) (1988)

Political offices
Preceded by Muhammad Muhammad Taib	Chief Minister of Selangor; 6 June 1997 – 9 August 2000	Succeeded by Khir Toyo
