= Lenggong (federal constituency) =

Federal constituency in Perak, Malaysia

Lenggong (P055)
Perak constituency

Federal constituency
- Legislature: Dewan Rakyat
- MP: Shamsul Anuar Nasarah; BN
- Constituency created: 2003
- First contested: 2004
- Last contested: 2022

Demographics
- Population (2020): 37,428
- Electors (2022): 36,950
- Area (km²): 1,793
- Pop. density (per km²): 20.9

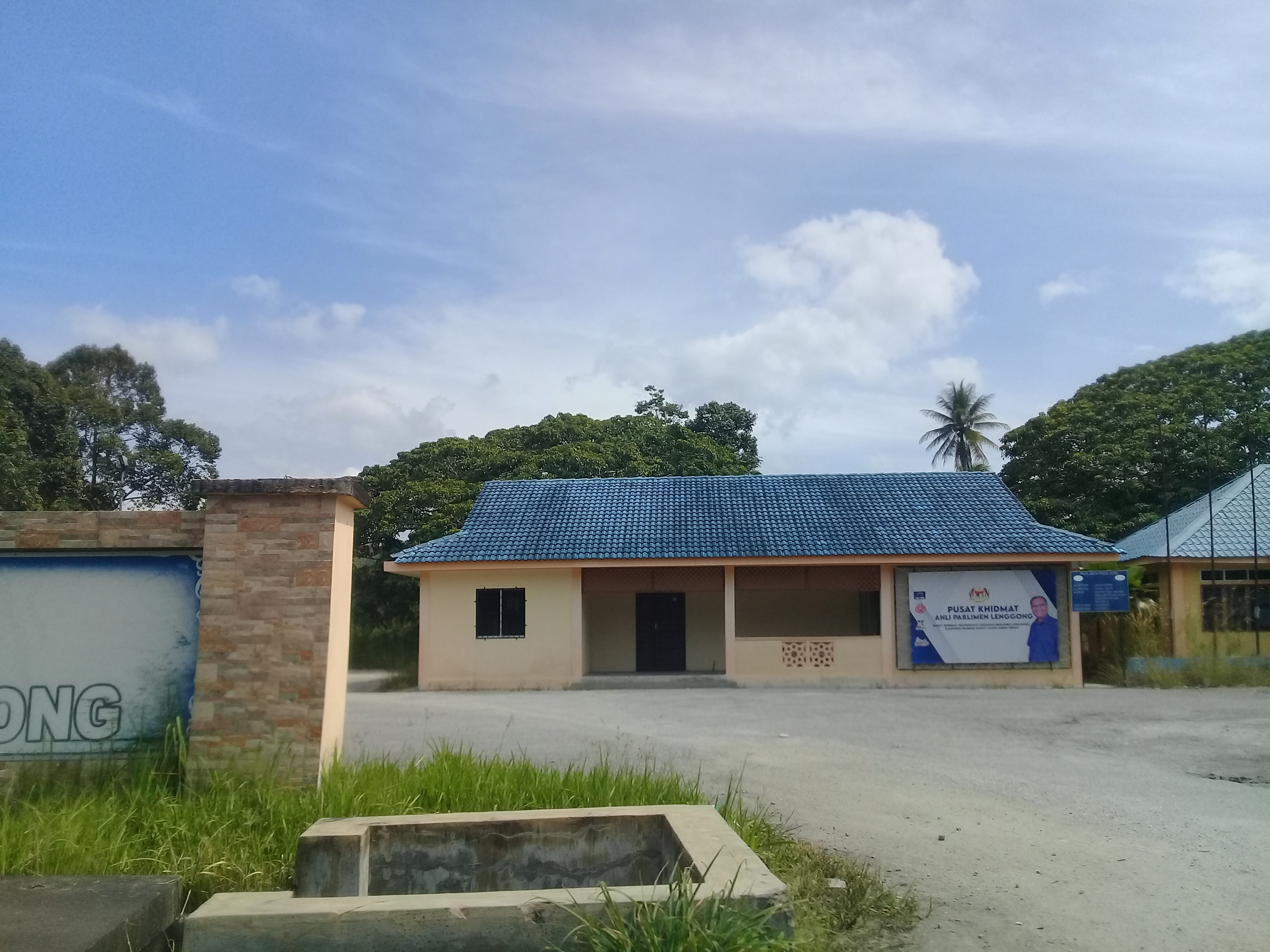
Lenggong Federal Constituency Service Centre

Lenggong is a federal constituency in Hulu Perak District, Perak, Malaysia, that has been represented in the Dewan Rakyat of the Malaysian Parliament since 2004. Represented by Dato Shamsul Anuar bin Haji Nasarah from UMNO. Lenggong also contributes two seats to the Perak State Legislative Assembly: Kota Tampan and Kenering, which were also held by UMNO.

The federal constituency was created in the 2003 redistribution and is mandated to return a single member to the Dewan Rakyat under the first past the post voting system. Lenggong is also an autonomous sub-district (daerah kecil), consisting of Lenggong (town) and the nearby communes of Durian Pipit and Temelong.

== Demographics ==
Ethnic breakdown of Lenggong's electorate as of 2022
1. Malay (84.9%)
2. Chinese (11.8%)
3. Other ethnicities (1.80%)
4. Indian (1.40%)
Age breakdown of Lenggong's electorate as of 2022
1. 18-20 (5.38%)
2. 21-29 (19.5%)
3. 30-39 (24.9%)
4. 40-49 (17.3%)
5. 50-59 (13.2%)
6. 60-69 (11.2%)
7. 70-79 (5.98%)
8. 80-89 (2.07%)
9. above 90 (0.43%)
Gender breakdown of Lenggong's electorate as of 2022
1. Male (49.5%)
2. Female (50.5%)

== History ==
=== Polling districts ===
According to the federal gazette issued on 31 October 2022, the Lenggong constituency is divided into 33 polling districts.

State constituency	Polling Districts	Code	Location
Kenering (N03）	Kenering Utara	055/03/01	SK Kenayat
Kenering (N03）	Tawai	055/03/02	SK Seri Tawai
Kenering (N03）	Ulu Kenderong	055/03/03	Maahad Tahfiz dan Kemukjizatan Al-Quran
Kenering (N03）	Padang Kunyit	055/03/04	SA Rakyat Al Wahiyah
Kenering (N03）	Kampong Ayer Panas	055/03/05	SK Tan Sri Ghzali Jawi
Kenering (N03）	Kampong Padang	055/03/06	SMK Gerik
Kenering (N03）	Kampong Ganda	055/03/07	SK Ganda Temengor
Kenering (N03）	Sungai Dala	055/03/08	SK RPS Dala
Kenering (N03）	Belum Baharu	055/03/09	SK Kenering
Kenering (N03）	FELDA Papulut	055/03/10	SK (FELDA) Papalut
Kenering (N03）	Lawin	055/03/11	SMK Kenering
Kenering (N03）	FELDA Lawin Selatan	055/03/12	SK (FELDA) Lawin Selatan
Kenering (N03）	Kampong Sawa	055/03/13	SA Rakyat Nur Kamaliah
Kenering (N03）	Ayer Kala	055/03/14	Dewan Orang Ramai Ayer Kala
Kenering (N03）	Selat Pagar	055/03/15	SJK (C) Selat Pagar
Kenering (N03）	Sumpitan	055/03/16	SK Sumpitan
Kenering (N03）	Padang Gerus	055/03/17	SJK (C) Padang Grus
Kenering (N03）	Bukit Sapi	055/03/18	SK Bukit Sapi
Kota Tampan (N04)	Kampong Gelok	055/04/01	SK Gelok
Kota Tampan (N04)	Kampong Lenggong	055/04/02	SK Lenggong
Kota Tampan (N04)	Kampong Sira	055/04/03	SK Bukit Balai
Kota Tampan (N04)	Bukit Raja	055/04/04	SJK (C) Yeong Hwa
Kota Tampan (N04)	Bukit Balai	055/04/05	SMK Dato Ahmad
Kota Tampan (N04)	Kampong Telok Batu	055/04/06	SK Lenggong
Kota Tampan (N04)	Kampong Temelong	055/04/07	SK Temelong
Kota Tampan (N04)	Kampong Chepor	055/04/08	SK Chepor
Kota Tampan (N04)	Kampong Luat	055/04/09	SK Luat
Kota Tampan (N04)	Banggol Belimbing	055/04/10	SK Banggol Belimbing
Kota Tampan (N04)	Kota Tampan	055/04/11	SJK (C) Kota Tampan
Kota Tampan (N04)	Lubok Kawah	055/04/12	SK Lubok Kawah
Kota Tampan (N04)	Kampong Raban	055/04/13	SMK Sultan Azlan Shah
Kota Tampan (N04)	Kuak	055/04/14	SK Raban
Kota Tampan (N04)	Kampong Beng	055/04/15	SK Beng

=== Representation history ===
Members of Parliament for Lenggong
Parliament	No	Years	Member	Party	Vote Share
Constituency created from Gerik and Chenderoh
11th	P055	2004–2008	Khamsiyah Yeop (خامسية يوڤ)	BN (UMNO)	10,924; 67.37%
12th	P055	2008–2013	Shamsul Anuar Nasarah (شمس الأنوار نصرة)	BN (UMNO)	10,992; 64.41%
13th	P055	2013–2018	Shamsul Anuar Nasarah (شمس الأنوار نصرة)	BN (UMNO)	13,285; 57.47%
14th	P055	2018–2022	Shamsul Anuar Nasarah (شمس الأنوار نصرة)	BN (UMNO)	12,523; 53.97%
15th	P055	2022–present	Shamsul Anuar Nasarah (شمس الأنوار نصرة)	BN (UMNO)	12,588; 45.48%

=== State constituency ===
Parliamentary constituency	State constituency						
Parliamentary constituency	1955–1959*	1959–1974	1974–1986	1986–1995	1995–2004	2004–2018	2018–present
Lenggong						Kenering	
Lenggong						Kota Tampan	

=== Historical boundaries ===
State Constituency	Area	
State Constituency	2003	2018
Kenering	Belum; Kenering; Lawin; Pos Piah; Pos Poi	Belum; Dala; Kampung Sumpitan; Kenering; Lawin
Kota Tampan	Lenggong; Kampung Batu Ring; Kampung Beng; Kampung Ulu Chepur; Kampung Ulu Jepai	

=== Current state assembly members ===
No.	State Constituency	Member	Coalition (Party)
N03	Kenering	Husaini Ariffin	PN (PAS)
N04	Kota Tampan	Saarani Mohamad	BN (UMNO)

=== Local governments & postcodes ===
No.	State Constituency	Local Government	Postcode
N03	Kenering	Gerik District Council (Kenering area); Lenggong District Council	33030 Kuala Kangsar; 33300, 33320 Gerik; 33400, 33410, 33420 Lenggong
N04	Kota Tampan	Lenggong District Council	33030 Kuala Kangsar; 33300, 33320 Gerik; 33400, 33410, 33420 Lenggong

== Election results ==
Malaysian general election, 2022
Party	Candidate	Votes	%	∆%
BN	Shamsul Anuar Nasarah	12,588	45.48	▼8.49
PN	Muhammad Rifaat Razman	11,709	42.30	▲42.30
PH	Jurey Latiff Mohd Rosli	3,382	12.22	▲12.22
Total valid votes		27,679	100.00	
Total rejected ballots		443		
Unreturned ballots		67		
Turnout		28,189	76.30	▼3.42
Registered electors		36,950		
Majority		879	3.18	▼21.70
BN hold		Swing		
Source(s) https://lom.agc.gov.my/ilims/upload/portal/akta/outputp/1753277/PUB610%20PARLIMEN%20PERAK.pdf

Malaysian general election, 2018
Party	Candidate	Votes	%	∆%
BN	Shamsul Anuar Nasarah	12,523	53.97	▼3.50
PAS	Muhammad Mujahid Mohammad Fadzil	6,750	29.09	▼13.64
PKR	Amirul Fairuzzeen Jamaluddin	3,932	16.94	▲16.94
Total valid votes		23,205	100.00	
Total rejected ballots		405		
Unreturned ballots		109		
Turnout		23,719	79.72	▼5.20
Registered electors		29,752		
Majority		5,773	24.88	▲9.94
BN hold		Swing		
Source(s) "His Majesty's Government Gazette - Notice of Contested Election, Parliament for the State of Perak [P.U. (B) 237/2018]" (PDF). Attorney General's Chambers of Malaysia. 3 May 2018. "Federal Government Gazette - Results of Contested Election and Statements of the Poll after the Official Addition of Votes, Parliamentary Constituencies for the State of Perak [P.U. (B) 311/2018]" (PDF). Attorney General's Chambers of Malaysia. 28 May 2018.

Malaysian general election, 2013
Party	Candidate	Votes	%	∆%
BN	Shamsul Anuar Nasarah	13,285	57.47	▼6.94
PAS	Razman Zakaria	9,832	42.53	▲6.94
Total valid votes		23,117	100.00	
Total rejected ballots		368		
Unreturned ballots		251		
Turnout		23,736	84.92	▼9.84
Registered electors		27,950		
Majority		3,453	14.94	▼13.90
BN hold		Swing		
Source(s) "Federal Government Gazette - Notice of Contested Election, Parliament for the State of Perak [P.U. (B) 174/2013]" (PDF). Attorney General's Chambers of Malaysia. 26 April 2013. Archived from the original (PDF) on 2019-12-29. "Federal Government Gazette - Results of Contested Election and Statements of the Poll after the Official Addition of Votes, Parliamentary Constituencies for the State of Perak [P.U. (B) 215/2013]" (PDF). Attorney General's Chambers of Malaysia. 22 May 2013.

Malaysian general election, 2008
Party	Candidate	Votes	%	∆%
BN	Shamsul Anuar Nasarah	10,992	64.41	▼2.96
PAS	Muhamad Zulkifli Mohamad Zakaria	6,073	35.59	▲2.96
Total valid votes		17,065	100.00	
Total rejected ballots		311		
Unreturned ballots		60		
Turnout		17,436	75.08	▲3.70
Registered electors		23,223		
Majority		4,919	28.82	▼5.92
BN hold		Swing		

Malaysian general election, 2004
Party	Candidate	Votes	%
BN	Khansiyah @ Khamsiyah Yeop	10,924	67.37
PAS	Zulkapely @ Zulkifly Abu	5,292	32.63
Total valid votes		16,216	100.00
Total rejected ballots		295	
Unreturned ballots		20	
Turnout		16,531	71.38
Registered electors		23,159	
Majority		5,632	34.74
This was a new constituency created.
