= Syed Ibrahim Syed Ahmad =

Malaysian politician (born 1967)

Yang Berhormat Dato' Sri Syed Ibrahim Syed Ahmad SSAP DIMP AMP AMN MLA
- سيد إبراهيم بن سيد أحمد

Member of the Pahang State Executive Council (Islamic Da'wah and Special Tasks : 16 May 2013–14 May 2018) (Islamic Religious Affairs, Education and Health : 14 May 2018–28 November 2022) (Islam Affairs, Rural Development and Indigenous Affairs : since 14 December 2022) (Note: Assumed portfolios 12 days after taking office.)
- Incumbent
- Assumed office 16 May 2013
- Monarchs: Ahmad Shah (2013–2019); Abdullah (since 2019)
- Menteri Besar: Adnan Yaakob (2013–2018); Wan Rosdy Wan Ismail (since 2018)
- Preceded by: Mohamad Safri Ab Aziz
- Constituency: Kerdau

Member of the Pahang State Legislative Assembly for Kerdau
- Incumbent
- Assumed office 6 March 2011
- Preceded by: Zaharuddin Abu Kassim (BN–UMNO)
- Majority: 2,724 (2011); 2,513 (2013); 1,934 (2018); 1,929 (2022)

Faction represented in Pahang State Legislative Assembly
- 2011–: Barisan Nasional

Personal details
- Born: 18 January 1967 (age 59) Pahang, Malaysia
- Citizenship: Malaysian
- Party: United Malays National Organisation (UMNO)
- Other political affiliations: Barisan Nasional (BN)
- Occupation: Politician

Syed Ibrahim bin Syed Ahmad (born 18 January 1967) is a Malaysian politician who has served as Member of the Pahang State Executive Council (EXCO) in the Barisan Nasional (BN) state administration under Menteris Besar Adnan Yaakob and Wan Rosdy Wan Ismail since May 2013 as well as Member of the Pahang State Legislative Assembly (MLA) for Kerdau since March 2011. He is a member of the United Malays National Organisation (UMNO), a component party of the BN coalition.

== Election results ==
Pahang State Legislative Assembly
Year	Constituency	Candidate	Votes	Pct	Opponent(s)	Votes	Pct	Ballots cast	Majority	Turnout
2011	N28 Kerdau	Syed Ibrahim Syed Ahmad (UMNO)	5,060	68.42%	Hassanuddin Salim (PAS)	2,336	31.58%	7,487	2,724	83.20%
2013	N28 Kerdau	Syed Ibrahim Syed Ahmad (UMNO)	5,912	58.42%	Kamal Ashaari (PAS)	3,399	41.58%	9,479	2,513	88.10%
2018	N28 Kerdau	Syed Ibrahim Syed Ahmad (UMNO)	5,255	52.41%	Aireroshairi Roslan (PAS)	3,321	31.21%	10,058	1,934	84.00%
2018	N28 Kerdau	Syed Ibrahim Syed Ahmad (UMNO)	5,255	52.41%	Adnan Abdul Manaf (AMANAH)	1,298	16.38%	10,058	1,934	84.00%
2022	N28 Kerdau	Syed Ibrahim Syed Ahmad (UMNO)	6,531	53.88%	Arhan Saludin (BERSATU)	4,602	37.97%	12,121	1,929	79.83%
2022	N28 Kerdau	Syed Ibrahim Syed Ahmad (UMNO)	6,531	53.88%	Ahmad Arif Md Daud (AMANAH)	988	8.15%	12,121	1,929	79.83%

== Honours ==
- Malaysia
  - Member of the Order of the Defender of the Realm (AMN) (2011)
- Pahang
  - Grand Knight of the Order of Sultan Ahmad Shah of Pahang (SSAP) – Dato' Sri (2017)
  - Knight Companion of the Order of the Crown of Pahang (DIMP) – Dato' (2013)
  - Member of the Order of the Crown of Pahang (AMP)
