= Perbadanan Tabung Pendidikan Tinggi Nasional =

Malaysian student loan authority

National Higher Education Fund Corporation
- Perbadanan Tabung Pendidikan Tinggi Nasional (PTPTN)
- Abbreviation: PTPTN
- Formation: 1 November 1997; 28 years ago
- Headquarters: Tingkat Bawah, Menara PTPTN, Blok D, Megan Avenue II, No. 12, Jalan Yap Kwan Seng, Kuala Lumpur, Malaysia
- Chairperson: Norliza Abdul Rahim
- Chief Executive: Ahmad Dasuki bin Abdul Majid
- Affiliations: Ministry of Higher Education
- Website: www.ptptn.gov.my

National Higher Education Fund Corporation (Malay: Perbadanan Tabung Pendidikan Tinggi Nasional), abbreviated PTPTN, is an authority responsible for giving study loans to students pursuing tertiary education in Malaysia. This agency is placed under the Ministry of Higher Education.

== Chairman ==
The current PTPTN chairman since 2023 is Norliza Abdul Rahim, who is also the vice-chief of UMNO women's wing and former chairman of UDA Holdings Berhad. She replaced Apli Yusoff, who was UMNO Kuala Nerus division chief and has been serving as PTPTN chairman since July 2022.

== PTPTN repayment exemption ==
PTPTN may waive a bachelor's degree student's loan in full if he meets the following criteria:

- Acquired a bachelor's degree with first class honours.
- Attended a full-time course.
- Completed his studies within the designated time-frame as stipulated in PTPTN's loan agreement.
- Completed their studies in the designated course as stipulated in PTPTN's loan agreement.
- The course attended is accredited by Malaysian Qualifications Agency (if one pursue his studies at a private institution).
- Submitted the application within 12 months from the date of convocation.

However, such waiver are subjected to the financial position of the government and is not automatically granted upon application.

== Actions against defaulters ==
Beginning 2015, hardcore PTPTN loan defaulters have been listed inside Central Credit Reference Information System (CCRIS), which is a Bank Negara Malaysia (BNM) database system that stores financial records of Malaysian borrowers.

Defaulters may also be barred from leaving the country by the Immigration Department, unless a loan repayment was made. The policy has been in place as early as 2013, but was lifted in 2018. However as of 2025, there has been proposals from the government to reinstate the travel ban for defaulters.
