= Kerdau (state constituency) =

Political subdivision in Malaysia

Pahang constituency

State constituency
- Legislature: Pahang State Legislative Assembly
MLA
Syed Ibrahim Syed Ahmad
BN
- Constituency created: 1974
- First contested: 1974
- Last contested: 2022

Demographics
- Electors (2022): 15,184

Kerdau is a state constituency in Pahang, Malaysia, that is represented in the Pahang State Legislative Assembly.

== Demographics ==
Ethnic breakdown of Kerdau's electorate as of 2022
1. Malay (88.1%)
2. Other ethnicities (5.77%)
3. Chinese (3.61%)
4. Indian (2.54%)

== History ==
=== Polling districts ===
According to the federal gazette issued on 31 October 2022, the Kerdau constituency is divided into 13 polling districts.

State constituency	Polling Districts	Code	Location
Kerdau (N28)	Rumpun Makmur	087/28/01	Dewan Puspa Rumpun Makmur
Kerdau (N28)	FELDA Jengka 25	087/28/02	SK LKTP Jengka 25
Kerdau (N28)	FELDA Jengka 22	087/28/03	SK LKTP Jengka 22
Kerdau (N28)	Kampung Batu Sawar	087/28/04	SK Batu Sawar
Kerdau (N28)	FELDA Jengka 23	087/28/05	SK LKTP Jengka 23
Kerdau (N28)	Kuala Tekal	087/28/06	SK Kuala Tekal
Kerdau (N28)	Bukit Lada	087/28/07	SK Pulau Pasir Mandi
Kerdau (N28)	Kerai	087/28/08	Balai Raya Kerai
Kerdau (N28)	Lipat Kajang	087/28/09	SK Lipat Kajang
Kerdau (N28)	Desa Murni	087/28/10	SBPI Temerloh
Kerdau (N28)	Kuala Kerdau	087/28/11	SK Paya Taram
Kerdau (N28)	Kuala Kerdau	087/28/12	SK Kerdau
Kerdau (N28)	Teluk Sentang	087/28/13	SK Teluk Sentang

=== Representation history ===
Members of the Legislative Assembly for Kerdau
Assembly	No	Years	Name	Party
Constituency created from Jerantut, Jenderak and Chenor
4th	N10	1974-1978	Ahmad Sallehuddin Omar	BN (UMNO)
5th	N10	1978-1982	Mohd Lazim	BN (UMNO)
6th	N10	1982-1986	Abdullah Kia	BN (UMNO)
Constituency abolished, merged into Jenderak, Pulau Tawar and Lancang
Constituency recreated from Sanggang and Jenderak
11th	N28	2004-2008	Redzwan Harun	BN (UMNO)
12th	N28	2008-2011	Zaharuddin Abu Kassim	BN (UMNO)
12th	N28	2011-2013	Syed Ibrahim Syed Ahmad	BN (UMNO)
13th	N28	2013-2018	Syed Ibrahim Syed Ahmad	BN (UMNO)
14th	N28	2018-2022	Syed Ibrahim Syed Ahmad	BN (UMNO)
15th	N28	2022–present	Syed Ibrahim Syed Ahmad	BN (UMNO)

== Election results ==
Pahang state election, 2022
Party	Candidate	Votes	%	∆%
BN	Syed Ibrahim Syed Ahmad	6,531	53.88	
PN	Mohd Arhan Mohd Saludin	4,602	37.97	▲37.97
PH	Ahmad Arif Md Daud	988	8.15	▲8.15
Total valid votes		12,121	100.00	
Total rejected ballots		141		
Unreturned ballots		19		
Turnout		12,281	80.88	
Registered electors		15,184		
Majority		1,929	15.91	
BN hold		Swing		
