= Jeram (state constituency) =

State constituency in Selangor, Malaysia

Jeram (N12)
Selangor constituency

State constituency
- Legislature: Selangor State Legislative Assembly
MLA
Harrison Hassan
PN
- Constituency created: 1958
- First contested: 1959
- Last contested: 2018

Demographics
- Electors (2023): 36,707

Jeram is a state constituency in Selangor, Malaysia, that has been represented in the Selangor State Legislative Assembly since 1959. It has been represented by Harrison Hassan of Perikatan Nasional (PN) since 2023.

The state constituency was created in the 1958 redistribution and is mandated to return a single member to the Selangor State Legislative Assembly under the first past the post voting system.

== Demographics ==
Ethnic breakdown of Jeram's electorate as of 2023
1. Malay (80.0%)
2. Indian (11.7%)
3. Chinese (6.73%)
4. Other ethnicities (1.62%)

== History ==
=== Polling districts ===
According to the federal gazette issued on 30 March 2018, the Jeram constituency is divided into 12 polling districts.

| State constituency | Polling Districts | Code | Location |
|---|---|---|---|
| Jeram（N12） | FELDA Bukit Cherakah | 096/12/01 | SK Bukit Ceraka |
| Jeram（N12） | Bukit Hijau | 096/12/02 | Pejabat JKKK Kampung Bukit Hijau |
| Jeram（N12） | Bukit Kuching Tengah | 096/11/03 | Dewan Orang Ramai Kampung Bukit Kuching Tengah |
| Jeram（N12） | Simpang Tiga | 096/12/04 | SK Jeram |
| Jeram（N12） | Jeram | 096/12/05 | SK Jeram Batu 20 Jeram |
| Jeram（N12） | Sungai Sembilang | 096/12/06 | SJK (C) Liat Choon (Pusat) Batu 17 |
| Jeram（N12） | Tambak Jawa | 096/12/07 | SK Tambak Jawa |
| Jeram（N12） | Bukit Cloh | 096/12/08 | SJK (T) Ladang Bukit Cheraka |
| Jeram（N12） | Bukit Kerayong | 096/12/09 | SK Bukit Kerayong |
| Jeram（N12） | Jeram Pantai | 096/12/10 | SRA Pekan Jeram |
| Jeram（N12） | Bandar Puncak Alam | 096/12/11 | SK Puncak Alam 2 |
| Jeram（N12） | Tuan Mee | 096/12/12 | SK Desa Aman |

=== Representation history ===
Members of the Legislative Assembly for Jeram
| Assembly | No | Years | Member | Party |
Constituency created
| 1st | N05 | 1959-1964 | Hussain Abdullah | Alliance (UMNO) |
| 2nd | N05 | 1964-1969 | Hussain Abdullah | Alliance (UMNO) |
| | | 1969-1971 | Assembly dissolved | |
| 3rd | N05 | 1971-1973 | Hussain Abdullah | Alliance (UMNO) |
| 3rd | N05 | 1973-1974 | Hussain Abdullah | BN (UMNO) |
| 4th | N12 | 1974-1978 | Norsiah Abdul Rahim | BN (UMNO) |
| 5th | N12 | 1978-1982 | Norsiah Abdul Rahim | BN (UMNO) |
| 6th | N12 | 1982-1986 | Miskon Sutero | BN (UMNO) |
| 7th | N13 | 1986-1990 | Miskon Sutero | BN (UMNO) |
| 8th | N13 | 1990-1995 | Miskon Sutero | BN (UMNO) |
| 9th | N12 | 1995-1999 | Mesrah Selamat | BN (UMNO) |
| 10th | N12 | 1999-2004 | Mesrah Selamat | BN (UMNO) |
| 11th | N12 | 2004-2008 | Amiruddin Setro | BN (UMNO) |
| 12th | N12 | 2008-2013 | Amiruddin Setro | BN (UMNO) |
| 13th | N12 | 2013-2018 | Amiruddin Setro | BN (UMNO) |
| 14th | N12 | 2018-2020 | Mohd Shaid Rosli | PH (BERSATU) |
| 14th | N12 | 2020–2023 | Mohd Shaid Rosli | PEJUANG |
| 15th | N12 | 2023–present | Harrison Hassan | PN (BERSATU) |

== Election results ==
Selangor state election, 2023
| Party | Candidate | Votes | % | ∆% |
|---|---|---|---|---|
| PN | Harrison Hassan | 16,731 | 59.62 | ▲59.62 |
| BN | Jahaya Ibrahim | 11,333 | 40.38 | ▲6.32 |
| Total valid votes | | 28,064 | 100.00 | |
| Total rejected ballots | | 181 | | |
| Unreturned ballots | | 30 | | |
| Turnout | | 28,275 | 77.03 | ▼11.75 |
| Registered electors | | 36,707 | | |
| Majority | | 5,398 | 19.24 | ▲12.36 |
| PN gain from PKR | | Swing | | ? |

Selangor state election, 2018
| Party | Candidate | Votes | % | ∆% |
|---|---|---|---|---|
| PKR | Mohd Shaid Rosli | 7,087 | 40.94 | ▲40.94 |
| BN | Zahar Azlan Arifin | 5,896 | 34.06 | ▼21.74 |
| PAS | Mohd Noor Mohd Shahar | 4,326 | 25.00 | ▼19.20 |
| Total valid votes | | 17,309 | 100.00 | |
| Total rejected ballots | | 193 | | |
| Unreturned ballots | | 32 | | |
| Turnout | | 17,534 | 88.78 | ▼1.42 |
| Registered electors | | 19,751 | | |
| Majority | | 1,191 | 6.88 | ▼4.72 |
| PH gain from BN | | Swing | | ? |

Selangor state election, 2013
| Party | Candidate | Votes | % | ∆% |
|---|---|---|---|---|
| BN | Amiruddin Setro | 13,632 | 55.80 | ▲0.86 |
| PAS | Muhmmad Rashid Muhmmad Kassim | 10,798 | 44.20 | ▼0.86 |
| Total valid votes | | 24,430 | 100.00 | |
| Total rejected ballots | | 362 | | |
| Unreturned ballots | | 49 | | |
| Turnout | | 24,841 | 90.20 | ▲9.09 |
| Registered electors | | 27,541 | | |
| Majority | | 2,834 | 11.60 | ▲1.72 |
| BN hold | | Swing | | |
Source(s) "Federal Government Gazette - Notice of Contested Election, State Legislative Assembly for the State of Selangor [P.U. (B) 192/2013]" (PDF). Attorney General's Chambers of Malaysia. 26 April 2013. Archived from the original (PDF) on 2019-12-29. "Federal Government Gazette - Results of Contested Election and Statements of the Poll after the Official Addition of Votes, State Constituencies for the State of Selangor [P.U. (B) 233/2013]". Attorney General's Chambers of Malaysia. 22 May 2013. Archived from the original (PDF) on 2018-10-02.

Selangor state election, 2008
| Party | Candidate | Votes | % | ∆% |
|---|---|---|---|---|
| BN | Amiruddin Setro | 8,209 | 54.94 | ▼16.82 |
| PAS | Hairi @ Maruji Darmo | 6,733 | 45.06 | ▲16.82 |
| Total valid votes | | 14,942 | 100.00 | |
| Total rejected ballots | | 333 | | |
| Unreturned ballots | | 6 | | |
| Turnout | | 15,281 | 81.11 | ▲3.37 |
| Registered electors | | 18,839 | | |
| Majority | | 1,476 | 9.88 | ▼33.64 |
| BN hold | | Swing | | |

Selangor state election, 2004
| Party | Candidate | Votes | % | ∆% |
|---|---|---|---|---|
| BN | Amiruddin Setro | 9,114 | 71.76 | ▲8.93 |
| PAS | Kamal Ashaari | 3,587 | 28.24 | ▼8.93 |
| Total valid votes | | 12,701 | 100.00 | |
| Total rejected ballots | | 314 | | |
| Unreturned ballots | | 113 | | |
| Turnout | | 13,128 | 77.74 | ▲1.37 |
| Registered electors | | 16,887 | | |
| Majority | | 5,527 | 43.52 | ▲17.86 |
| BN hold | | Swing | | |

Selangor state election, 1999
| Party | Candidate | Votes | % | ∆% |
|---|---|---|---|---|
| BN | Mesrah Selamat | 7,225 | 62.83 | ▼25.30 |
| PAS | Abd Muhaimin Mohammad Shahar | 4,274 | 37.17 | ▲37.17 |
| Total valid votes | | 11,499 | 100.00 | |
| Total rejected ballots | | 416 | | |
| Unreturned ballots | | 4 | | |
| Turnout | | 11,919 | 76.37 | ▲2.40 |
| Registered electors | | 15,606 | | |
| Majority | | 2,951 | 25.66 | ▼50.60 |
| BN hold | | Swing | | |

Selangor state election, 1995
| Party | Candidate | Votes | % | ∆% |
|---|---|---|---|---|
| BN | Mesrah Selamat | 9,254 | 88.13 | ▲14.94 |
| S46 | Tukiran Mohd. Ali | 1,246 | 11.87 | ▼14.94 |
| Total valid votes | | 10,500 | 100.00 | |
| Total rejected ballots | | 507 | | |
| Unreturned ballots | | 18 | | |
| Turnout | | 11,025 | 73.97 | ▼2.51 |
| Registered electors | | 14,905 | | |
| Majority | | 8,008 | 76.26 | ▲29.88 |
| BN hold | | Swing | | |

Selangor state election, 1990
| Party | Candidate | Votes | % | ∆% |
|---|---|---|---|---|
| BN | Miskon Sutero | 7,587 | 73.19 | ▼7.33 |
| S46 | Suradi Timin | 2,779 | 26.81 | ▲26.81 |
| Total valid votes | | 10,366 | 100.00 | |
| Total rejected ballots | | 641 | | |
| Unreturned ballots | | 0 | | |
| Turnout | | 11,007 | 76.48 | ▲2.61 |
| Registered electors | | 14,392 | | |
| Majority | | 4,808 | 46.38 | ▼14.66 |
| BN hold | | Swing | | |

Selangor state election, 1986
| Party | Candidate | Votes | % | ∆% |
|---|---|---|---|---|
| BN | Miskon Sutero | 7,045 | 80.52 | ▲2.38 |
| PAS | Kasmani Kasanvariro | 1,704 | 19.48 | ▲8.39 |
| Total valid votes | | 8,749 | 100.00 | |
| Total rejected ballots | | 440 | | |
| Unreturned ballots | | 0 | | |
| Turnout | | 9,189 | 73.87 | ▼1.28 |
| Registered electors | | 12,440 | | |
| Majority | | 5,341 | 61.05 | ▼6.00 |
| BN hold | | Swing | | |

Selangor state election, 1982
| Party | Candidate | Votes | % | ∆% |
|---|---|---|---|---|
| BN | Miskon Sutero | 6,587 | 78.14 | ▲2.80 |
| PAS | Jarmani Mohd. Umar | 935 | 11.09 | ▼13.30 |
| DAP | Idrus Idris | 908 | 10.77 | ▲10.77 |
| Total valid votes | | 8,430 | 100.00 | |
| Total rejected ballots | | 276 | | |
| Unreturned ballots | | 0 | | |
| Turnout | | 8,706 | 75.15 | ▼0.20 |
| Registered electors | | 11,585 | | |
| Majority | | 5,652 | 67.05 | ▲15.83 |
| BN hold | | Swing | | |

Selangor state election, 1978
| Party | Candidate | Votes | % | ∆% |
|---|---|---|---|---|
| BN | Norsiah Abdul Rahim | 5,552 | 75.61 | ▲0.94 |
| PAS | Abdul Rahman Abdul Manan | 1,791 | 24.39 | ▲24.39 |
| Total valid votes | | 7,343 | 100.00 | |
| Total rejected ballots | | 537 | | |
| Unreturned ballots | | 0 | | |
| Turnout | | 7,880 | 75.35 | ▼1.38 |
| Registered electors | | 10,458 | | |
| Majority | | 3,761 | 51.22 | ▲1.89 |
| BN hold | | Swing | | |

Selangor state election, 1974
| Party | Candidate | Votes | % | ∆% |
|---|---|---|---|---|
| BN | Norsiah Abdul Rahim | 4,641 | 74.67 | ▲74.67 |
| Independent | Samat Tambi | 1,574 | 25.33 | ▲25.33 |
| Total valid votes | | 6,215 | 100.00 | |
| Total rejected ballots | | 695 | | |
| Unreturned ballots | | 0 | | |
| Turnout | | 6,910 | 76.00 | ▼4.98 |
| Registered electors | | 9,092 | | |
| Majority | | 3,067 | 49.34 | ▲28.38 |
| BN gain from Alliance | | Swing | | ? |

Selangor state election, 1969
| Party | Candidate | Votes | % | ∆% |
|---|---|---|---|---|
| Alliance | Hussain Abdullah | 5,153 | 60.48 | ▲2.36 |
| PMIP | Jarmani Mohamed Umar | 3,367 | 39.52 | ▲17.79 |
| Total valid votes | | 8,520 | 100.00 | |
| Total rejected ballots | | 1,786 | | |
| Unreturned ballots | | 0 | | |
| Turnout | | 10,306 | 80.98 | ▲5.05 |
| Registered electors | | 12,727 | | |
| Majority | | 1,786 | 20.96 | ▼20.15 |
| Alliance hold | | Swing | | |

Selangor state election, 1964
| Party | Candidate | Votes | % | ∆% |
|---|---|---|---|---|
| Alliance | Hussain Abdullah | 4,863 | 62.84 | ▼7.28 |
| PMIP | Mahaban Hussein | 1,682 | 21.73 | ▲8.15 |
| Socialist Front | Zailani Sulaiman | 1,194 | 15.43 | ▲15.43 |
| Total valid votes | | 7,739 | 100.00 | |
| Total rejected ballots | | 524 | | |
| Unreturned ballots | | 0 | | |
| Turnout | | 8,263 | 75.93 | ▼1.59 |
| Registered electors | | 10,882 | | |
| Majority | | 3,181 | 41.11 | ▲0.87 |
| Alliance hold | | Swing | | |

Selangor state election, 1959
| Party | Candidate | Votes | % |
|---|---|---|---|
| Alliance | Hussain Abdullah | 3,943 | 70.12 |
| PMIP | Kassim Sirat | 1,680 | 29.88 |
| Total valid votes | | 5,623 | 100.00 |
| Total rejected ballots | | 188 | |
| Unreturned ballots | | 0 | |
| Turnout | | 5,811 | 77.52 |
| Registered electors | | 7,496 | |
| Majority | | 2,263 | 40.24 |
This was a new constituency created.
