= List of former Malaysian federal electoral districts by electorate =

This is a list of former Malaysian federal electoral districts by electorate (registered voters).

== Electorate by year ==
=== 2022 ===
#	2022	
#	Parliamentary constituency	Electorate
1	Bangi	303,430
2	Kota Raja	244,712
3	Damansara	239,103
4	Subang	230,940
5	Tebrau	223,301
6	Iskandar Puteri	222,437
7	Klang	208,913
8	Gombak	206,744
9	Pasir Gudang	198,485
10	Petaling Jaya	195,148
11	Kapar	189,369
12	Selayang	181,539
13	Sungai Petani	168,847
14	Sepang	168,039
–	Average: Selangor	167,175
15	Hulu Langat	166,902
16	Shah Alam	165,744
17	Pulai	165,313
18	Kota Melaka	164,140
19	Tambun	160,558
20	Sungai Buloh	158,090
21	Seremban	157,244
22	Rasah	155,896
23	Hulu Selangor	154,317
24	Puchong	152,861
25	Kulai	151,247
26	Tumpat	149,371
27	Pandan	148,370
28	Kuala Langat	148,637
29	Gopeng	143,657
30	Miri	143,229
31	Kemaman	139,423
32	Johor Bahru	136,368
33	Batu Pahat	133,910
34	Padang Serai	133,867
35	Rembau	133,555
36	Ampang	133,494
37	Kuala Kedah	132,500
38	Merbok	132,444
39	Kluang	132,342
40	Baling	132,099
41	Marang	131,756
42	Seputeh	124,805
43	Kuala Terengganu	123,305
44	Bachok	123,183
45	Taiping	121,566
46	Stampin	121,009
47	Bukit Mertajam	120,819
48	Indera Mahkota	120,549
49	Wangsa Maju	120,323
50	Segambut	119,652
51	Bayan Baru	119,640
52	Pekan	119,443
53	Bandar Tun Razak	119,185
54	Hang Tuah Jaya	118,493
55	Ipoh Timor	118,178
56	Bukit Gelugor	117,134
57	Tangga Batu	115,998
58	Dungun	115,559
59	Kota Bharu	115,450
–	Average: Terengganu	115,357
60	Pokok Sena	114,838
61	Ipoh Barat	114,654
62	Batu	113,863
63	Kubang Kerian	113,640
64	Bintulu	113,599
65	Pasir Puteh	113,070
66	Batu Gajah	111,896
67	Besut	111,650
68	Petra Jaya	109,809
69	Bandar Kuching	109,710
–	Average: Malacca	109,554
70	Sepanggar	108,370
71	Beruas	108,249
72	Kubang Pasu	108,217
73	Setiu	107,294
74	Permatang Pauh	107,186
75	Pengkalan Chepa	106,982
76	Temerloh	106,829
–	Average: Negeri Sembilan	106,358
77	Alor Setar	105,994
78	Kuala Nerus	105,952
79	Sibu	105,875
–	Average: Kedah	105,054
80	Jerai	105,001
81	Ledang	104,577
82	Port Dickson	104,450
83	Kuala Selangor	102,951
84	Lembah Pantai	101,828
85	Cheras	101,184
–	Average: Johor	100,638
–	Average: Kelantan	100,340
86	Lahad Datu	100,256
87	Nibong Tebal	100,062
88	Tanah Merah	98,782
89	Bakri	97,335
90	Jasin	96,208
91	Jempol	95,813
92	Setiawangsa	95,753
–	Average: National	95,377
–	Average: Federal Territories	95,290
93	Pendang	94,547
94	Pasir Mas	94,544
–	Average: Penang	94,356
95	Kepong	94,285
96	Bukit Gantang	94,253
97	Jelutong	93,989
98	Tanjong Malim	93,873
99	Alor Gajah	93,311
100	Rantau Panjang	93,248
101	Lumut	92,972
102	Bukit Bendera	92,521
103	Kuala Krai	92,335
104	Kulim-Bandar Baharu	90,141
105	Kampar	89,894
106	Bagan	89,447
107	Rompin	89,131
108	Machang	88,825
109	Batu Kawan	88,812
110	Hulu Terengganu	89,917
111	Kuantan	87,597
112	Keningau	87,588
113	Tawau	87,477
114	Lanang	87,356
115	Teluk Intan	87,222
116	Bentong	87,058
117	Jerantut	87,051
118	Ketereh	85,281
–	Average: Pahang	84,870
119	Kalabakan	83,970
120	Tuaran	83,419
121	Kepala Batas	83,081
122	Kota Samarahan	82,229
–	Average: Pahang	81,210
123	Tampin	81,099
124	Tasek Gelugor	80,868
125	Titiwangsa	80,747
126	Kota Marudu	80,735
127	Bagan Serai	80,293
128	Balik Pulau	80,264
129	Puncak Borneo	79,969
130	Kota Belud	79,885
131	Bukit Bintang	79,782
132	Paya Besar	79,744
133	Santubong	79,540
134	Parit Sulong	79,484
135	Sri Gading	78,602
136	Bera	77,669
137	Penampang	77,214
138	Kudat	75,724
139	Pontian	75,212
140	Raub	75,064
141	Kangar	74,859
142	Pasir Salak	74,761
143	Kota Kinabalu	74,059
144	Sungai Siput	72,395
145	Libaran	72,332
146	Semporna	72,169
147	Tanjung Piai	70,679
148	Gua Musang	70,254
149	Pagoh	69,939
150	Segamat	69,360
151	Masjid Tanah	69,174
152	Muar	68,925
153	Parit Buntar	68,502
154	Jerlun	67,601
–	Average: Sabah	67,575
155	Tenggara	67,294
156	Langkawi	66,777
157	Ranau	66,517
158	Mersing	66,275
159	Larut	65,719
–	Average: Perlis	65,309
160	Serian	65,273
161	Sungai Besar	64,382
162	Sekijang	63,981
163	Kuala Pilah	63,247
164	Putatan	63,173
165	Sik	63,126
–	Average: Sarawak	62,680
166	Tanjong Karang	62,194
167	Tapah	61,946
168	Kota Tinggi	61,291
169	Ayer Hitam	61,041
170	Arau	60,876
171	Kuala Krau	60,537
172	Padang Besar	60,192
173	Papar	59,942
174	Padang Terap	59,806
175	Jeli	59,798
176	Jelebu	59,561
177	Baram	59,535
178	Simpang Renggam	59,033
179	Sibuti	58,522
180	Bagan Datuk	58,183
181	Pensiangan	55,672
182	Sandakan	55,542
183	Pengerang	55,316
184	Sarikei	55,018
185	Sembrong	54,982
186	Maran	53,128
187	Tanjong	52,803
188	Sabak Bernam	51,609
189	Sri Aman	50,164
190	Labis	49,846
191	Parit	47,915
192	Gerik	47,565
193	Mas Gading	47,171
194	Lipis	47,124
195	Kuala Kangsar	46,985
196	Mukah	46,964
197	Cameron Highlands	46,020
198	Sipitang	45,871
199	Selangau	45,743
200	Kapit	45,210
201	Kinabatangan	44,773
202	Beluran	44,727
203	Saratok	44,531
204	Labuan	44,484
205	Batu Sapi	43,916
206	Hulu Rajang	43,438
207	Beaufort	43,248
208	Batang Lupar	43,072
209	Putrajaya	42,881
210	Tenom	42,045
211	Limbang	41,999
212	Betong	41,743
213	Kimanis	40,763
214	Padang Rengas	38,686
215	Lenggong	36,950
216	Julau	34,850
217	Lawas	33,655
218	Tanjong Manis	32,948
219	Batang Sadong	32,640
220	Kanowit	30,988
221	Lubok Antu	28,995
222	Igan	28,290

=== 2018 ===
#	2018	
#	Parliamentary constituency	Electorate
1	Bangi	178,790
2	Damansara	164,322
3	Klang	149,348
4	Kota Raja	149,021
5	Subang	146,422
6	Gombak	141,112
7	Petaling Jaya	140,920
8	Iskandar Puteri	138,299
9	Kota Melaka	126,848
10	Kapar	124,983
11	Pasir Gudang	124,172
12	Tebrau	123,033
13	Selayang	116,176
14	Sungai Petani	112,577
15	Tumpat	110,924
16	Seremban	110,168
–	Average: Selangor	109,776
17	Tambun	107,763
18	Kemaman	107,593
19	Shah Alam	107,316
20	Baling	107,213
21	Pulai	106,268
22	Marang	104,898
23	Sepang	104,508
24	Kuala Terengganu	103,611
25	Rasah	102,838
26	Kuala Langat	102,406
27	Hulu Langat	102,363
28	Johor Bahru	101,409
29	Pandan	101,319
30	Hulu Selangor	100,990
31	Gopeng	99,167
32	Kulai	99,147
33	Batu Pahat	98,543
34	Kuala Kedah	97,753
35	Kluang	96,915
36	Puchong	96,437
37	Bachok	92,606
–	Average: Terengganu	92,079
38	Ampang	91,737
39	Bukit Gelugor	91,595
40	Ipoh Timor	91,486
41	Bayan Baru	90,780
42	Taiping	90,729
43	Sungai Buloh	90,707
44	Dungun	90,506
45	Hang Tuah Jaya	89,364
46	Bukit Mertajam	88,998
47	Pekan	88,899
48	Kota Bharu	88,708
49	Wangsa Maju	88,482
50	Rembau	88,365
51	Merbok	87,782
52	Pokok Sena	86,892
53	Besut	86,627
54	Seputeh	86,256
55	Setiu	86,247
56	Pasir Puteh	85,411
57	Ipoh Barat	84,874
58	Padang Serai	84,834
59	Kuala Nerus	83,663
60	Bandar Tun Razak	83,650
61	Tangga Batu	83,213
–	Average: Malacca	82,444
62	Kubang Kerian	82,018
63	Bandar Kuching	81,856
64	Permatang Pauh	81,789
65	Batu Gajah	81,399
66	Miri	80,386
67	Lembah Pantai	80,346
68	Alor Setar	80,272
69	Jerai	79,976
70	Beruas	79,794
71	Cheras	78,819
72	Segambut	77,956
73	Ledang	77,474
74	Indera Mahkota	77,208
75	Jelutong	76,991
–	Average: Kedah	76,433
76	Batu	76,328
–	Average: Negeri Sembilan	75,974
77	Pengkalan Chepa	75,384
78	Port Dickson	75,212
79	Temerloh	75,081
80	Bukit Bendera	75,069
–	Average: Kelantan	74,966
81	Pendang	74,867
82	Sibu	74,149
83	Bakri	73,883
84	Kubang Pasu	73,881
85	Hulu Terengganu	73,487
86	Jasin	73,432
87	Nibong Tebal	73,383
88	Tanah Merah	73,172
–	Average: Penang	72,741
89	Kepong	72,696
90	Setiawangsa	72,136
91	Jempol	72,122
92	Bagan	71,583
93	Pasir Mas	71,222
94	Alor Gajah	70,364
95	Kuala Krai	70,348
–	Average: Johor	69,923
96	Bukit Gantang	69,873
97	Bukit Bintang	69,526
–	Average: Federal Territories	69,497
98	Kampar	69,436
99	Kuala Selangor	69,397
100	Tanjong Malim	68,468
101	Machang	68,387
102	Bentong	67,359
–	Average: National	67,300
103	Lumut	67,157
104	Kulim-Bandar Baharu	66,587
105	Teluk Intan	66,487
106	Stampin	66,240
107	Rantau Panjang	66,115
108	Batu Kawan	65,394
109	Ketereh	65,238
110	Bintulu	65,049
111	Jerantut	63,609
–	Average: Perak	62,953
112	Kuantan	62,696
113	Sepanggar	62,415
114	Lanang	61,973
115	Rompin	61,918
116	Titiwangsa	61,598
117	Silam	60,942
118	Tasek Gelugor	60,850
119	Tampin	60,765
120	Kepala Batas	60,523
121	Tawau	59,919
122	Parit Sulong	59,609
123	Bagan Serai	59,293
124	Balik Pulau	59,086
–	Average: Pahang	58,856
125	Bera	58,711
126	Petra Jaya	57,925
127	Kota Belud	57,919
128	Raub	57,723
129	Kota Kinabalu	56,220
130	Kangar	55,938
131	Pontian	55,570
132	Segamat	55,350
133	Paya Besar	55,135
134	Sungai Siput	55,002
135	Pasir Salak	54,671
136	Tuaran	54,400
137	Jerlun	54,132
138	Tanjung Piai	53,528
139	Penampang	53,131
140	Gua Musang	52,524
141	Kudat	52,251
142	Kalabakan	52,199
143	Sri Gading	52,119
144	Parit Buntar	51,860
145	Pagoh	51,512
146	Masjid Tanah	51,441
147	Keningau	51,177
148	Muar	50,843
149	Sik	50,385
–	Average: Perlis	50,074
150	Kuala Pilah	49,801
151	Tanjong	49,586
152	Larut	49,453
153	Sungai Besar	48,739
154	Jelebu	48,522
155	Semporna	48,248
156	Arau	48,187
157	Mersing	48,176
158	Libaran	47,914
159	Jeli	47,470
160	Bagan Datuk	47,309
161	Kuala Krau	47,264
162	Tanjong Karang	47,198
163	Tapah	47,128
164	Kota Marudu	47,007
165	Kota Tinggi	46,677
166	Padang Terap	46,644
167	Kota Samarahan	46,300
168	Puncak Borneo	46,180
169	Ayer Hitam	46,157
170	Padang Besar	46,096
171	Santubong	45,628
172	Sekijang	45,596
173	Tenggara	44,749
–	Average: Sabah	44,693
174	Sembrong	44,137
175	Simpang Renggam	43,998
176	Ranau	43,706
177	Papar	43,586
178	Langkawi	42,697
179	Putatan	41,312
180	Maran	41,036
181	Sabak Bernam	40,863
182	Pengerang	40,479
183	Labis	40,356
184	Sandakan	39,777
185	Sarikei	39,561
–	Average: Sarawak	39,386
186	Serian	37,629
187	Kuala Kangsar	36,954
188	Parit	35,910
189	Gerik	35,903
190	Baram	35,685
191	Lipis	35,294
192	Beaufort	33,342
193	Sri Aman	33,016
194	Batu Sapi	32,574
195	Cameron Highlands	32,048
196	Sipitang	31,882
197	Sibuti	31,868
198	Pensiangan	31,377
199	Padang Rengas	30,996
200	Kapit	30,658
201	Mukah	30,608
202	Saratok	30,517
203	Selangau	30,026
204	Batang Lupar	29,811
205	Lenggong	29,752
206	Kimanis	29,618
207	Mas Gading	29,617
208	Tenom	29,182
209	Betong	29,145
210	Kinabatangan	28,730
211	Beluran	28,509
212	Labuan	28,356
213	Hulu Rajang	27,520
214	Putrajaya	27,306
215	Limbang	26,409
216	Julau	25,380
217	Batang Sadong	23,213
218	Tanjong Manis	21,899
219	Lawas	21,297
220	Kanowit	21,022
221	Lubok Antu	20,801
222	Igan	19,592

=== 2004 ===
#	2004	
#	Parliamentary constituency	Electorate
1	Kapar	104,185
2	Gombak	92,225
3	Johor Bahru	91,108
4	Kota Melaka	82,781
5	Seremban	81,704
6	Hulu Langat	79,999
7	Serdang	78,837
8	Kuala Kedah	78,791
9	Petaling Jaya Utara	75,935
10	Seputeh	74,702
11	Baling	74,698
12	Miri	74,266
13	Klang	74,062
14	Petaling Jaya Selatan	73,503
15	Ipoh Timor	73,333
16	Pulai	73,256
17	Batu Gajah	73,148
18	Kelana Jaya	72,518
19	Kuala Terengganu	72,259
20	Selayang	71,152
21	Sungai Petani	70,920
22	Tumpat	70,810
23	Gelang Patah	70,023
24	Shah Alam	69,170
25	Subang	68,739
26	Lumut	68,522
27	Gopeng	68,466
28	Batu Pahat	68,415
29	Ipoh Barat	68,394
30	Cheras	67,794
31	Batu	67,652
32	Kluang	67,475
33	Bandar Tun Razak	67,241
34	Ampang	66,626
35	Kemaman	66,416
36	Pokok Sena	66,072
37	Bukit Katil	66,034
38	Tambun	65,219
39	Rasah	65,152
40	Bukit Bendera	65,126
41	Bukit Bintang	65,112
42	Taiping	65,046
–	Average: Selangor	64,649
43	Marang	64,367
44	Jerai	63,886
45	Kuala Langat	63,151
46	Kulai	62,273
47	Kota Bharu	61,409
48	Pasir Gudang	61,171
49	Kampar	60,874
50	Sibu	60,832
51	Kepong	60,273
52	Bukit Gelugor	60,123
53	Stampin	59,809
54	Puchong	59,694
55	Jelutong	59,641
56	Bukit Mertajam	58,736
57	Hulu Selangor	58,533
58	Kota Raja	58,374
59	Sepang	58,296
60	Merbok	57,922
61	Tanjong	57,902
62	Pandan	57,884
–	Average: Malacca	57,653
63	Segambut	57,349
64	Bagan	57,322
65	Alor Setar	57,313
66	Pasir Puteh	57,308
67	Pendang	57,180
68	Ledang	57,175
–	Average: Terengganu	56,991
69	Lembah Pantai	56,562
70	Telok Kemang	56,459
71	Dungun	55,711
72	Bakri	55,438
73	Bayan Baru	55,407
74	Bachok	55,319
75	Bandar Kuching	55,012
–	Average: Kedah	54,793
76	Permatang Pauh	54,041
77	Padang Serai	53,925
78	Bukit Gantang	53,880
–	Average: Negeri Sembilan	53,723
–	Average: Federal Territories	53,693
79	Rembau	53,537
80	Tangga Batu	53,291
81	Jasin	53,218
82	Telok Intan	53,063
83	Pasir Mas	52,771
84	Tanjong Malim	52,743
85	Pekan	52,687
86	Bentong	52,665
87	Tebrau	52,644
88	Kuala Nerus	52,468
89	Titiwangsa	52,017
–	Average: Penang	51,720
90	Alor Gajah	51,588
91	Setiawangsa	51,536
92	Besut	51,284
93	Wangsa Maju	50,682
94	Jempol	50,553
95	Parit Sulong	50,134
96	Kulim-Bandar Baharu	50,024
97	Temerloh	49,984
98	Kubang Pasu	49,594
99	Bintulu	49,374
–	Average: Perak	48,765
100	Setiu	48,161
–	Average: Johor	48,039
101	Bagan Serai	47,745
102	Indera Mahkota	47,455
–	Average: Kelantan	47,337
103	Kubang Kerian	47,148
–	Average: National	46,962
104	Sungai Siput	46,783
105	Ketereh	46,493
106	Jerantut	46,059
107	Kuantan	45,935
108	Kuala Krai	45,259
109	Hulu Terengganu	45,258
110	Pengkalan Chepa	44,844
111	Parit Buntar	44,797
112	Tanjong Piai	44,575
113	Raub	44,543
114	Pontian	44,377
115	Jerlun	44,148
116	Machang	43,874
117	Kota Kinabalu	43,121
118	Kuala Pilah	43,094
119	Batu Kawan	43,055
120	Pasir Salak	42,959
121	Beruas	42,173
122	Muar	42,130
123	Kuala Selangor	41,712
124	Tasek Gelugor	41,615
125	Tampin	41,571
126	Tawau	41,143
127	Nibong Tebal	41,161
128	Kota Belud	41,065
129	Segamat	40,983
130	Rantau Panjang	40,956
–	Average: Pahang	40,723
131	Bera	40,631
132	Kangar	40,516
133	Silam	40,362
134	Pagoh	40,172
135	Larut	40,150
136	Lanang	40,100
137	Kepala Batas	39,622
138	Petra Jaya	39,365
139	Tuaran	39,338
140	Masjid Tanah	39,005
141	Tapah	38,899
142	Balik Pulau	38,611
143	Rompin	38,319
144	Arau	38,067
145	Jelebu	37,716
146	Tanah Merah	37,665
–	Average: Perlis	37,494
147	Paya Besar	37,440
148	Kudat	37,089
149	Sik	37,036
150	Sarikei	35,880
151	Bukit Mas	35,865
152	Tanjong Karang	35,816
153	Sri Gading	35,807
154	Mambong	35,652
155	Kalabakan	34,617
156	Sepanggar	34,527
157	Keningau	34,510
158	Simpang Renggam	34,240
159	Bagan Datok	34,182
160	Putatan	34,123
161	Padang Besar	33,899
162	Mersing	33,890
163	Semporna	33,772
164	Sekijang	33,594
165	Kota Tinggi	33,262
166	Sandakan	33,208
167	Penampang	32,832
168	Ayer Hitam	32,804
169	Jeli	32,729
170	Labis	32,518
171	Padang Terap	32,412
–	Average: Sarawak	32,314
172	Maran	31,860
173	Serian	31,601
174	Kuala Krau	31,404
175	Papar	31,275
176	Sungai Besar	31,001
177	Pengerang	30,957
178	Sabak Bernam	30,862
179	Sembrong	30,767
–	Average: Sabah	30,758
180	Tenggara	29,819
181	Parit	28,916
182	Mas Gading	28,800
183	Kuala Rajang	28,706
184	Kuala Kangsar	28,391
185	Kota Marudu	28,111
186	Lipis	28,083
187	Sri Aman	28,015
188	Ranau	27,986
189	Langkawi	27,980
190	Kota Samarahan	27,628
191	Beaufort	26,461
192	Libaran	26,888
193	Batu Sapi	26,504
194	Gua Musang	26,137
195	Mukah	25,853
196	Baram	25,361
197	Padang Rengas	24,863
198	Gerik	24,646
199	Saratok	24,607
200	Sipitang	23,542
201	Kapit	23,330
202	Santubong	23,238
203	Lenggong	23,159
204	Cameron Highlands	23,061
205	Labuan	22,006
206	Kimanis	21,576
207	Betong	20,737
208	Selangau	20,459
209	Tenom	20,417
210	Julau	19,765
211	Kinabatangan	19,441
212	Batang Lupar	19,027
213	Beluran	18,960
214	Batang Sadong	18,496
215	Kanowit	18,181
216	Pensiangan	18,075
217	Lubok Antu	17,647
218	Hulu Rajang	17,185
219	Putrajaya	5,079

=== 2008 ===
#	2008	
#	Parliamentary constituency	Electorate
1	Kapar	113,812
2	Gombak	100,825
3	Serdang	97,558
4	Hulu Langat	93,176
5	Johor Bahru	89,787
6	Subang	87,114
7	Seremban	85,900
8	Kota Melaka	85,075
9	Kuala Kedah	83,397
10	Tumpat	81,522
11	Selayang	81,399
12	Kelana Jaya	81,122
13	Kuala Terengganu	80,999
14	Pulai	80,688
15	Gelang Patah	80,196
16	Klang	79,105
17	Baling	78,455
18	Puchong	78,200
19	Batu Gajah	77,740
20	Bukit Katil	77,642
21	Seputeh	77,425
22	Shah Alam	77,353
23	Petaling Jaya Utara	76,982
24	Ipoh Timor	76,843
25	Sungai Petani	76,670
26	Gopeng	75,786
27	Kemaman	75,613
28	Marang	75,199
29	Pasir Gudang	74,441
30	Kota Raja	74,107
31	Bandar Tun Razak	73,534
32	Rasah	73,315
33	Petaling Jaya Selatan	73,230
34	Lumut	72,794
–	Average: Selangor	72,474
35	Kluang	71,894
36	Batu	71,156
37	Batu Pahat	70,827
38	Ipoh Barat	70,221
39	Tambun	69,979
40	Ampang	69,948
41	Stampin	69,926
42	Pokok Sena	69,850
43	Kota Bharu	68,720
44	Cheras	68,687
45	Kulai	68,271
46	Kuala Langat	67,220
47	Taiping	66,340
48	Bukit Gelugor	66,203
49	Bachok	66,078
50	Pandan	65,867
51	Jerai	65,552
–	Average: Terengganu	65,504
52	Dungun	65,015
53	Merbok	64,804
54	Bukit Mertajam	64,488
55	Hulu Selangor	64,389
56	Rembau	64,348
57	Bukit Bendera	64,340
58	Pasir Puteh	64,223
59	Tebrau	64,214
60	Sepang	62,964
–	Average: Malacca	62,443
61	Bayan Baru	62,243
62	Kuala Nerus	61,596
63	Kepong	61,427
64	Jelutong	61,207
65	Pendang	61,180
66	Tangga Batu	60,610
67	Pasir Mas	60,592
68	Segambut	60,480
69	Telok Kemang	60,137
70	Bukit Bintang	59,847
71	Padang Serai	59,831
72	Kampar	59,504
73	Pekan	59,451
74	Bagan	59,372
75	Permatang Pauh	59,187
76	Alor Setar	59,098
77	Ledang	58,777
78	Besut	58,437
–	Average: Negeri Sembilan	58,355
–	Average: Kedah	58,323
79	Miri	58,254
80	Bakri	57,074
81	Lembah Pantai	57,069
82	Bukit Gantang	56,858
83	Setiawangsa	56,684
84	Jasin	56,373
–	Average: Federal Territories	55,298
85	Kubang Kerian	54,953
–	Average: Penang	54,861
86	Wangsa Maju	54,845
87	Temerloh	54,784
88	Sibu	54,603
89	Setiu	54,588
–	Average: Kelantan	54,345
90	Alor Gajah	54,322
91	Tanjong Malim	54,043
92	Jempol	53,973
93	Bentong	53,893
94	Pengkalan Chepa	53,466
95	Kubang Pasu	53,413
96	Telok Intan	52,907
97	Bandar Kuching	52,838
98	Ketereh	52,784
99	Tanjong	52,603
100	Hulu Terengganu	52,588
101	Kuala Krai	52,540
102	Indera Mahkota	52,096
103	Kulim-Bandar Baharu	51,969
104	Bintulu	51,227
–	Average: Johor	50,937
105	Lanang	50,724
106	Parit Sulong	50,299
–	Average: Perak	50,192
107	Machang	49,889
108	Titiwangsa	49,756
–	Average: National	49,698
109	Jerantut	49,270
110	Kuantan	48,348
111	Nibong Tebal	48,215
112	Kuala Selangor	47,944
113	Tampin	47,942
114	Batu Kawan	47,698
115	Sungai Siput	47,565
116	Bagan Serai	47,138
117	Raub	46,805
118	Tanjong Piai	45,876
119	Jerlun	45,285
120	Rantau Panjang	45,252
121	Parit Buntar	45,207
122	Tanah Merah	45,163
123	Tasek Gelugor	44,465
124	Kota Kinabalu	44,196
125	Kangar	43,806
–	Average: Pahang	43,668
126	Tawau	43,627
127	Silam	43,625
128	Beruas	43,567
129	Bera	43,494
130	Kota Belud	43,478
131	Pontian	43,321
132	Pasir Salak	43,160
133	Kepala Batas	43,148
134	Rompin	42,865
135	Kuala Pilah	42,406
136	Petra Jaya	41,383
137	Muar	41,303
138	Tuaran	41,179
139	Segamat	40,855
140	Masjid Tanah	40,634
141	Paya Besar	40,431
142	Sepanggar	40,289
–	Average: Perlis	40,288
143	Sik	40,264
144	Pagoh	40,244
145	Larut	40,202
146	Balik Pulau	40,023
147	Kudat	39,917
148	Arau	39,836
149	Jelebu	38,821
150	Tapah	38,152
151	Padang Besar	37,222
152	Sri Gading	37,132
153	Mambong	36,702
154	Mersing	36,702
155	Kalabakan	36,614
156	Jeli	36,549
157	Penampang	36,505
158	Tanjong Karang	36,353
159	Keningau	35,736
160	Padang Terap	35,535
161	Sekijang	35,510
162	Semporna	35,421
163	Putatan	35,079
164	Ayer Hitam	35,008
165	Sungai Besar	35,006
166	Simpang Renggam	34,892
167	Bagan Datok	34,698
168	Kuala Krau	34,616
169	Kota Tinggi	34,456
170	Labis	33,497
171	Sembrong	33,406
172	Pengerang	33,162
173	Maran	33,153
174	Sandakan	32,933
–	Average: Sabah	32,624
175	Papar	32,622
176	Tenggara	32,520
177	Sarikei	32,519
178	Kota Marudu	32,266
179	Libaran	31,544
180	Ranau	30,940
181	Santubong	30,940
182	Sabak Bernam	30,745
–	Average: Sarawak	29,947
183	Langkawi	29,546
184	Gua Musang	29,094
185	Kota Samarahan	28,975
186	Parit	28,945
187	Lipis	28,570
188	Kuala Kangsar	28,401
189	Serian	28,287
190	Beaufort	26,871
191	Gerik	26,557
192	Batu Sapi	25,908
193	Sri Aman	25,800
194	Baram	25,086
195	Padang Rengas	24,707
196	Sipitang	24,510
197	Saratok	24,260
198	Cameron Highlands	23,580
199	Lenggong	23,304
200	Mukah	23,091
201	Sibuti	23,045
202	Kapit	22,898
203	Batang Lupar	22,751
204	Betong	22,637
205	Kimanis	22,425
206	Mas Gading	22,213
207	Labuan	21,062
208	Tenom	20,922
209	Limbang	20,754
210	Julau	20,403
211	Selangau	20,215
212	Pensiangan	20,080
213	Kinabatangan	19,702
214	Beluran	19,218
215	Hulu Rajang	18,111
216	Kanowit	17,650
217	Lubok Antu	17,316
218	Tanjong Manis	17,066
219	Batang Sadong	16,917
220	Lawas	16,114
221	Igan	15,661
222	Putrajaya	6,900

=== 2013 ===
#	2013	
#	Parliamentary constituency	Electorate
1	Kapar	144,159
2	Serdang	133,139
3	Subang	128,543
4	Hulu Langat	127,347
5	Gombak	123,290
6	Puchong	107,010
7	Gelang Patah	106,726
8	Kota Raja	105,909
9	Selayang	105,895
10	Seremban	102,305
11	Kelana Jaya	101,236
12	Pasir Gudang	101,041
13	Pulai	100,490
14	Shah Alam	99,957
15	Bukit Katil	99,438
16	Tumpat	98,632
17	Gopeng	97,092
18	Klang	97,073
19	Johor Bahru	96,321
20	Kuala Kedah	95,328
21	Kuala Terengganu	94,406
22	Sungai Petani	93,176
23	Baling	93,168
–	Average: Selangor	93,129
24	Kota Melaka	92,322
25	Kemaman	91,942
26	Bandar Tun Razak	90,993
27	Marang	90,795
28	Tebrau	90,482
29	Tambun	89,435
30	Kuala Langat	88,474
31	Rasah	88,403
32	Lumut	88,300
33	Batu Pahat	88,272
34	Batu Gajah	87,587
35	Kluang	86,732
36	Seputeh	85,976
37	Merbok	85,908
38	Hulu Selangor	85,697
39	Batu	85,402
40	Petaling Jaya Utara	85,401
41	Stampin	84,732
42	Sepang	84,362
43	Kulai	83,991
44	Pandan	83,857
45	Ampang	83,135
46	Bukit Gelugor	81,897
47	Ipoh Timor	81,818
48	Bachok	81,566
49	Kota Bharu	81,268
50	Pokok Sena	80,714
51	Pekan	80,260
52	Rembau	79,661
53	Petaling Jaya Selatan	79,558
–	Average: Terengganu	79,368
54	Bayan Baru	79,155
55	Bukit Mertajam	78,996
56	Dungun	78,174
57	Taiping	78,148
58	Ipoh Barat	77,761
59	Pasir Puteh	76,259
60	Kuala Nerus	76,238
61	Segambut	75,631
62	Jerai	74,410
63	Padang Serai	74,095
64	Tangga Batu	73,282
–	Average: Malacca	73,173
65	Besut	72,566
66	Cheras	72,551
67	Lembah Pantai	72,396
68	Pasir Mas	71,965
69	Permatang Pauh	71,699
70	Bukit Gantang	71,257
71	Jelutong	71,247
72	Miri	71,170
73	Bukit Bendera	71,085
74	Telok Kemang	70,524
75	Pendang	70,135
–	Average: Negeri Sembilan	69,498
–	Average: Kedah	69,405
76	Ledang	69,316
77	Alor Setar	69,009
78	Bagan	68,503
79	Kepong	68,035
80	Wangsa Maju	67,775
81	Setiu	67,280
82	Bakri	67,202
83	Temerloh	66,105
–	Average: Kelantan	65,612
84	Kubang Pasu	65,550
85	Kubang Kerian	65,390
86	Jempol	65,213
–	Average: Penang	65,095
87	Sibu	64,601
88	Tanjong Malim	64,499
89	Jasin	64,455
90	Pengkalan Chepa	64,409
91	Indera Mahkota	64,219
–	Average: Federal Territories	64,026
92	Kampar	63,619
93	Alor Gajah	63,591
94	Hulu Terengganu	63,543
95	Kuala Krai	63,101
96	Setiawangsa	62,309
97	Kuala Selangor	62,298
98	Bentong	62,266
99	Ketereh	62,217
–	Average: Johor	61,743
100	Kulim-Bandar Baharu	60,910
101	Telok Intan	60,483
102	Bintulu	59,893
–	Average: National	59,766
103	Nibong Tebal	59,345
104	Machang	59,226
–	Average: Perak	58,614
105	Jerantut	58,364
106	Tanah Merah	58,237
107	Batu Kawan	57,500
108	Tampin	57,268
109	Lanang	57,143
110	Parit Sulong	56,896
111	Kuantan	56,280
112	Bukit Bintang	55,721
113	Titiwangsa	55,282
114	Bagan Serai	54,792
115	Raub	54,214
116	Tasek Gelugor	54,042
117	Rompin	53,596
118	Sepanggar	53,374
119	Bandar Kuching	53,336
120	Rantau Panjang	52,903
–	Average: Pahang	52,759
121	Jerlun	52,383
122	Tanjong Piai	51,875
123	Silam	51,662
124	Kepala Batas	51,635
125	Sungai Siput	51,596
126	Tawau	51,538
127	Pasir Salak	51,498
128	Tanjong	51,487
129	Kota Marudu	51,467
130	Parit Buntar	51,422
131	Kangar	51,207
132	Bera	50,997
133	Kota Kinabalu	50,516
134	Petra Jaya	49,750
135	Balik Pulau	49,641
136	Pontian	49,633
137	Beruas	49,205
138	Tuaran	48,276
139	Muar	48,208
140	Paya Besar	48,067
141	Kuala Pilah	47,671
142	Kudat	47,249
143	Segamat	47,009
144	Kinabatangan	46,793
145	Pagoh	46,793
146	Sik	46,786
147	Larut	46,577
148	Masjid Tanah	45,952
–	Average: Perlis	45,686
149	Tapah	45,485
150	Jelebu	44,937
151	Sri Gading	44,816
152	Mersing	44,497
153	Penampang	44,323
154	Arau	43,876
155	Keningau	43,691
156	Jeli	43,224
157	Sekijang	43,066
158	Kuala Krau	43,003
159	Ayer Hitam	42,913
160	Sungai Besar	42,837
161	Mambong	42,344
162	Tanjong Karang	42,333
163	Kota Marudu	42,197
164	Padang Besar	41,974
165	Padang Terap	41,960
166	Kota Tinggi	41,894
167	Sembrong	41,588
168	Semporna	41,549
169	Gua Musang	40,176
170	Simpang Renggam	40,143
171	Bagan Datok	39,924
172	Libaran	39,772
173	Tenggara	39,694
–	Average: Sabah	39,273
174	Ranau	39,053
175	Papar	38,771
176	Maran	38,436
177	Kota Samarahan	38,158
178	Pengerang	37,999
179	Labis	37,714
180	Langkawi	37,536
181	Putatan	37,490
182	Sabak Bernam	37,318
183	Sandakan	37,058
184	Santubong	37,017
185	Sarikei	36,550
–	Average: Sarawak	34,967
186	Serian	33,713
187	Kuala Kangsar	33,540
188	Parit	33,503
189	Gerik	32,725
190	Lipis	32,324
191	Batu Sapi	30,199
192	Beaufort	30,097
193	Sri Aman	29,789
194	Baram	29,385
195	Sipitang	29,177
196	Padang Rengas	28,518
197	Sibuti	28,351
198	Cameron Highlands	27,980
199	Lenggong	27,950
200	Saratok	27,562
201	Batang Lupar	27,360
202	Kimanis	26,628
203	Mukah	26,477
204	Betong	26,322
205	Kapit	26,195
206	Pensiangan	26,194
207	Mas Gading	25,771
208	Selangau	25,461
209	Tenom	25,304
210	Kinabatangan	24,748
211	Beluran	24,688
212	Labuan	24,474
213	Limbang	24,278
214	Julau	22,522
215	Hulu Rajang	21,686
216	Batang Sadong	19,839
217	Kanowit	19,433
218	Lubok Antu	19,303
219	Tanjong Manis	19,215
220	Lawas	18,845
221	Igan	17,771
222	Putrajaya	15,791

=== 1986 ===
#	1986	
#	Parliamentary constituency	Electorate
1	Puchong	81,005
2	Petaling Jaya	80,403
3	Selayang	77,737
4	Seputeh	75,153
5	Klang	74,964
6	Kepong	71,767
7	Ampang Jaya	69,849
8	Kota Melaka	69,034
9	Batu	68,865
10	Bukit Bintang	67,548
11	Seremban	65,571
12	Tebrau	65,203
13	Sungai Besi	64,859
14	Pasir Pinji	64,320
15	Lembah Pantai	62,937
16	Bandar Kuching	62,550
17	Titiwangsa	62,511
18	Kluang	62,099
19	Batu Berendam	62,000
–	Average: Federal Territories	60,726
20	Tanjong	60,640
21	Shah Alam	60,360
22	Johor Bahru	59,922
23	Jelutong	59,890
24	Bayan Baru	58,545
25	Ipoh	58,454
26	Senai	57,568
27	Taiping	56,599
28	Rasah	56,521
29	Hulu Langat	55,558
30	Batu Pahat	55,418
31	Bagan	55,105
32	Alor Setar	54,803
33	Bukit Bendera	54,711
34	Kuantan	54,595
–	Average: Selangor	54,565
35	Tambun	53,184
36	Kota Bharu	52,613
37	Pontian	52,207
38	Parit Sulong	52,180
39	Sibu	51,925
40	Bukit Mertajam	51,437
41	Kota Tinggi	50,240
42	Batu Gajah	49,701
43	Pulai	49,333
44	Lumut	49,202
45	Lambir	49,095
46	Kubang Pasu	49,059
47	Kuala Terengganu	48,621
–	Average: Malacca	48,582
48	Sungai Petani	48,478
–	Average: Penang	47,472
49	Ledang	47,174
50	Telok Intan	46,847
51	Sungai Benut	46,727
–	Average: Johor	45,561
52	Balik Pulau	45,541
53	Kangar	45,082
54	Tumpat	44,661
55	Segamat	44,007
56	Kapar	43,928
57	Raub	43,705
58	Bakri	43,085
59	Tanjong Malim	42,959
60	Pendang	42,930
61	Hulu Selangor	42,826
62	Pengkalan Chepa	42,785
–	Average: Kedah	42,757
–	Average: Perlis	42,697
–	Average: Negeri Sembilan	42,666
63	Kuala Kedah	42,665
64	Jerlun-Langkawi	42,597
65	Padang Serai	42,084
66	Bachok	41,992
67	Kuala Langat	41,565
–	Average: Perak	41,486
68	Kampar	41,374
69	Padang Terap	40,884
70	Sik	40,806
71	Merbok	40,636
72	Arau	40,312
73	Nibong Tebal	40,216
74	Bukit Gantang	40,131
75	Baling	40,008
76	Sepang	39,895
77	Kota Setar	39,775
78	Jasin	39,600
79	Bagan Serai	39,328
80	Bentong	39,270
81	Sungai Petani	39,128
82	Temerloh	39,089
–	Average: National	38,848
83	Telok Kemang	38,790
84	Pasir Mas	38,423
85	Tampin	38,268
86	Labis	38,264
87	Maran	38,133
–	Average: Pahang	38,098
88	Selandar	37,313
89	Parit Buntar	37,132
90	Kuala Kangsar	36,681
91	Pasir Salak	36,547
–	Average: Kelantan	36,141
92	Jempol	35,516
93	Sungai Siput	35,441
94	Kuala Pilah	35,433
95	Dungun	35,422
96	Lipis	35,385
97	Muar	35,374
98	Gopeng	35,034
99	Alor Gajah	34,966
100	Permatang Pauh	34,879
101	Beruas	34,828
102	Tapah	34,743
103	Jerai	34,741
104	Rantau Panjang	34,604
–	Average: Terengganu	34,168
105	Pekan	34,017
106	Parit	34,011
107	Nilam Puri	33,990
108	Bagan Datok	33,965
109	Tanah Merah	33,837
110	Sandakan	33,325
111	Marang	33,206
112	Pagoh	33,028
113	Jerantut	33,010
114	Kok Lanas	32,990
115	Kemaman	32,931
116	Pasir Puteh	32,842
117	Besut	32,749
118	Larut	32,593
119	Kuala Selangor	32,510
120	Tasek Chenderoh	32,415
121	Mentakab	32,402
122	Tanjong Karang	31,785
123	Kuala Nerus	31,682
124	Padawan	31,553
125	Sabak Bernam	31,529
126	Rompin	31,373
127	Tasek Gelugor	31,021
128	Kepala Batas	30,209
129	Setiu	29,793
130	Kuala Krai	29,684
131	Serian	29,063
132	Hulu Terengganu	28,941
133	Gaya	28,878
134	Gerik	28,691
135	Jelebu	28,561
136	Tawau	28,395
137	Mersing	28,281
138	Machang	27,430
139	Sarikei	27,403
140	Mas Gading	27,391
141	Bintulu	26,938
142	Batang Lupar	26,383
143	Kota Belud	25,351
144	Gua Musang	23,977
145	Marudu	23,541
146	Bukit Mas	23,345
–	Average: Sarawak	23,208
147	Semporna	23,170
148	Tuaran	23,050
149	Silam	22,130
150	Tanjong Aru	21,587
151	Baram	21,482
152	Jambongan	21,468
–	Average: Sabah	21,155
153	Penampang	20,366
154	Betong	20,361
155	Rajang	20,338
156	Mukah	20,089
157	Bandau	19,425
158	Kinabatangan	18,979
159	Padas	18,447
160	Saratok	17,795
161	Papar	17,237
162	Kinabalu	16,793
163	Samarahan	16,620
164	Keningau	15,595
165	Kimanis	15,528
166	Simunjan	15,527
167	Kapit	15,431
168	Limbang	15,139
169	Pensiangan	14,693
170	Ulu Rajang	14,220
171	Kanowit	13,919
172	Lubok Antu	13,386
173	Julau	12,181
174	Labuan	12,171
175	Paloh	?
176	Santubong	?
177	Sri Gading	?

=== 1990 ===
#	1990	
#	Parliamentary constituency	Electorate
1	Selayang	99,488
2	Puchong	98,733
3	Petaling Jaya	98,383
4	Batu	90,251
5	Shah Alam	90,248
6	Ampang Jaya	89,112
7	Seputeh	81,644
8	Klang	80,860
9	Sungai Besi	80,856
10	Tebrau	79,636
11	Batu Berendam	77,505
12	Kepong	76,766
13	Seremban	75,579
14	Kluang	74,164
15	Kota Melaka	71,608
16	Pasir Pinji	68,551
–	Average: Federal Territories	68,028
17	Bayan Baru	67,582
18	Lembah Pantai	67,283
19	Rasah	66,654
20	Bukit Bintang	66,054
–	Average: Selangor	65,830
21	Senai	65,703
22	Titiwangsa	64,980
23	Johor Bahru	64,933
24	Tambun	64,726
25	Pulai	64,590
26	Bandar Kuching	64,265
27	Hulu Langat	64,264
28	Kuantan	63,807
29	Taiping	62,748
30	Jelutong	62,127
31	Tanjong	60,888
32	Kota Tinggi	60,530
33	Ipoh	60,460
34	Batu Pahat	59,836
35	Lumut	59,557
36	Alor Setar	59,144
37	Bukit Bendera	57,027
38	Parit Sulong	56,771
39	Bagan	56,494
40	Kota Bharu	56,244
41	Pontian	55,472
42	Kuala Terengganu	55,261
43	Bukit Mertajam	54,350
–	Average: Johor	54,010
44	Kangar	53,634
45	Batu Gajah	53,465
46	Kapar	53,280
47	Miri	53,111
–	Average: Malacca	53,012
48	Sungai Petani	52,783
49	Segamat	52,628
50	Kubang Pasu	52,341
51	Ledang	51,374
52	Tumpat	50,838
–	Average: Penang	50,838
53	Balik Pulau	50,713
54	Merbok	50,657
55	Sungai Benut	50,209
56	Pengkalan Chepa	49,897
57	Telok Intan	49,732
–	Average: Perlis	49,549
–	Average: Negeri Sembilan	49,353
58	Tanjong Malim	48,635
59	Sepang	48,579
60	Kuala Langat	48,369
61	Raub	48,189
62	Temerloh	47,490
63	Bakri	47,443
64	Pendang	46,952
–	Average: Kedah	46,952
65	Hulu Selangor	46,933
66	Bentong	46,872
67	Pekan	46,823
68	Jerlun-Langkawi	46,489
69	Bachok	46,416
70	Maran	45,819
71	Sik	45,671
72	Arau	45,463
73	Kulim-Bandar Baharu	45,399
–	Average: Pahang	45,300
74	Jempol	45,061
75	Kota Setar	45,042
76	Padang Terap	44,957
–	Average: Perak	44,843
77	Telok Kemang	44,775
–	Average: National	44,209
78	Padang Serai	44,102
79	Kuala Kedah	43,669
80	Nibong Tebal	43,221
81	Baling	42,945
82	Marang	42,706
83	Tampin	42,637
84	Dungun	42,362
85	Labis	42,252
86	Pasir Mas	41,901
87	Kemaman	41,781
88	Bukit Gantang	41,775
89	Kampar	41,773
90	Jasin	41,729
–	Average: Kelantan	41,232
91	Rantau Panjang	41,118
92	Sri Gading	41,007
–	Average: Terengganu	40,799
93	Permatang Pauh	40,526
94	Sungai Siput	40,499
95	Nilam Puri	40,265
96	Rompin	39,808
97	Tanah Merah	39,644
98	Padawan	39,260
99	Parit Buntar	39,086
100	Lanang	39,078
101	Lipis	39,027
102	Bagan Serai	38,834
103	Beruas	38,832
104	Sandakan	38,761
105	Pasir Salak	38,608
106	Kuala Nerus	38,415
107	Mentakab	38,271
108	Tapah	38,209
109	Besut	38,144
110	Selandar	37,983
111	Tawau	37,886
112	Kuala Kangsar	37,659
113	Kuala Pilah	37,480
114	Kok Lanas	37,190
115	Jerai	37,171
116	Jerantut	36,891
117	Kuala Selangor	36,695
118	Parit	36,484
119	Gopeng	36,347
120	Alor Gajah	36,234
121	Muar	36,070
122	Pasir Puteh	35,760
123	Gaya	35,387
124	Tasek Gelugor	35,227
125	Pagoh	35,036
126	Bagan Datok	34,811
127	Labis	34,517
128	Gerik	34,506
129	Kuala Krai	34,330
130	Setiu	34,183
131	Sabak Bernam	33,761
132	Hulu Terengganu	33,541
133	Larut	33,469
134	Jelebu	33,282
135	Tanjong Karang	32,910
136	Tasek Chenderoh	32,614
137	Sibu	32,371
138	Semporna	32,139
139	Silam	32,015
140	Machang	31,353
141	Kota Belud	30,320
142	Mas Gading	30,110
143	Kepala Batas	31,068
144	Gua Musang	31,064
145	Jambongan	29,864
146	Tanjong Aru	29,787
147	Bintulu	29,673
148	Penampang	28,548
149	Sarikei	28,316
150	Marudu	27,819
151	Serian	27,663
152	Bukit Mas	27,641
153	Tuaran	27,405
154	Kinabatangan	27,228
–	Average: Sabah	27,181
–	Average: Sarawak	26,039
155	Petra Jaya	25,722
156	Mukah	25,155
157	Padas	24,129
158	Sri Aman	23,807
159	Kota Samarahan	23,599
160	Kuala Rajang	23,498
161	Papar	23,138
162	Baram	22,722
163	Bandau	22,239
164	Saratok	21,289
165	Kinabalu	20,968
166	Kimanis	20,130
167	Keningau	19,617
168	Santubong	18,759
169	Batang Sadong	18,727
170	Limbawang	18,416
171	Kapit	17,854
172	Pensiangan	17,816
173	Betong	17,700
174	Selangau	16,971
175	Labuan	16,388
176	Kanowit	16,154
177	Batang Lupar	16,145
178	Lubok Antu	14,845
179	Julau	14,622
180	Hulu Rajang	14,004

=== 1995 ===
#	1995	
#	Parliamentary constituency	Electorate
1	Ampang Jaya	85,954
2	Shah Alam	85,202
3	Batu Berendam	79,861
4	Serdang	78,462
5	Bayan Baru	78,458
6	Selayang	78,312
7	Klang	77,188
8	Bandar Kuching	74,952
9	Johor Bahru	74,295
10	Kota Melaka	73,894
11	Subang	73,868
12	Ipoh Timor	73,832
13	Seremban	73,689
14	Rasah	73,076
15	Bagan	70,718
–	Average: Penang	70,535
16	Tebrau	70,298
17	Bukit Bendera	69,242
18	Petaling Jaya Utara	68,828
19	Pulai	68,416
20	Taiping	68,346
21	Seputeh	67,829
22	Gombak	67,634
23	Kapar	67,555
24	Petaling Jaya Selatan	66,786
25	Hulu Langat	66,747
26	Ipoh Barat	66,502
27	Kuantan	65,639
28	Telok Kemang	65,346
29	Wangsa Maju	65,199
30	Sungai Petani	65,046
–	Average: Selangor	64,688
31	Miri	64,430
32	Pokok Sena	63,901
33	Cheras	63,895
34	Tanjong	63,350
35	Gelang Patah	63,323
36	Bukit Mertajam	63,255
37	Lumut	62,635
38	Kuala Terengganu	62,583
39	Kampar	62,349
40	Batu Pahat	62,058
41	Alor Setar	61,685
42	Senai	60,688
43	Pontian	60,443
44	Kota Bharu	60,313
45	Kluang	60,293
46	Kepong	60,111
47	Padang Serai	60,098
48	Jelutong	59,859
49	Merbok	59,438
50	Bukit Bintang	59,375
51	Balik Pulau	59,045
52	Parit Sulong	58,591
53	Tambun	58,572
–	Average: Malacca	58,571
54	Batu Gajah	58,445
55	Batu	58,299
56	Segamat	57,774
57	Kuala Kedah	57,405
58	Segambut	57,127
–	Average: Federal Territories	55,641
–	Average: Johor	55,417
59	Sungai Benut	54,894
–	Average: Negeri Sembilan	54,555
60	Ledang	54,467
61	Tawau	54,450
62	Titiwangsa	54,176
63	Pasir Puteh	54,132
64	Marang	54,119
65	Kuala Langat	53,718
66	Bandar Tun Razak	53,687
67	Bukit Gantang	52,768
68	Kota Tinggi	52,742
69	Tanjong Malim	52,398
70	Lembah Pantai	52,108
71	Sepang	52,071
72	Sri Gading	51,910
73	Telok Intan	51,500
74	Raub	51,453
75	Pendang	51,451
76	Temerloh	51,410
77	Hulu Selangor	51,256
78	Baling	50,596
79	Bakri	49,982
90	Bachok	49,957
91	Nibong Tebal	49,896
92	Kuala Selangor	49,730
93	Bentong	49,137
–	Average: Perak	48,506
94	Pasir Mas	48,349
–	Average: Kedah	48,317
95	Permatang Pauh	47,743
96	Paya Besar	47,684
97	Selandar	47,641
–	Average: National	47,450
98	Labis	47,413
99	Sibu	47,334
90	Kemaman	47,240
91	Gopeng	47,169
92	Jempol	47,127
93	Alor Gajah	46,363
94	Tumpat	46,099
–	Average: Terengganu	45,960
95	Kulim-Bandar Baharu	45,946
–	Average: Kelantan	45,429
–	Average: Pahang	45,293
96	Sungai Siput	45,156
97	Jasin	45,096
98	Kubang Pasu	44,843
99	Padawan	44,363
100	Kubang Kerian	44,296
101	Jerlun	43,877
102	Tampin	43,797
103	Besut	43,549
104	Tenggara	43,080
105	Kuala Pilah	42,869
106	Rantau Panjang	42,692
107	Parit Buntar	42,455
108	Lipis	42,343
109	Pengkalan Chepa	42,224
110	Peringat	42,221
111	Pasir Salak	42,171
112	Dungun	42,087
113	Kuala Nerus	41,868
114	Beruas	41,857
115	Mentakab	41,837
116	Bagan Serai	41,820
117	Sandakan	41,590
118	Maran	41,406
119	Tanjong Karang	41,160
120	Muar	40,991
121	Tanah Merah	40,873
122	Yan	40,657
123	Gaya	40,100
124	Jerantut	39,936
125	Tapah	39,831
126	Silam	39,537
127	Sibu	39,368
128	Machang	39,192
129	Penampang	39,174
130	Setiu	39,151
131	Pagoh	38,895
132	Mersing	37,782
133	Hulu Terengganu	37,079
134	Tasek Gelugor	37,055
135	Gerik	36,679
136	Keningau	36,443
137	Kuala Krai	36,367
138	Bintulu	36,340
139	Kangar	36,235
140	Tanjong Aru	36,121
141	Kepala Batas	36,105
142	Beaufort	36,084
143	Jelebu	35,984
144	Larut	35,919
145	Bagan Datok	35,368
146	Sabak Bernam	34,887
–	Average: Perlis	34,732
147	Arau	34,665
148	Kota Belud	34,388
149	Chenderoh	34,381
150	Pekan	34,307
151	Parit	33,460
152	Semporna	33,336
153	Libaran	33,323
154	Padang Besar	33,295
155	Mas Gading	33,239
156	Jeli	33,203
157	Rompin	33,069
158	Sarikei	32,736
159	Tuaran	32,382
–	Average: Sabah	32,336
160	Marudu	32,298
161	Kuala Kangsar	32,015
162	Serian	31,634
163	Bukit Mas	31,563
164	Petra Jaya	31,545
165	Sik	30,802
–	Average: Sarawak	30,276
166	Mukah	29,048
167	Papar	28,908
168	Gua Musang	28,082
169	Sri Aman	27,513
170	Kota Samarahan	27,354
171	Kuala Rajang	27,339
172	Padang Terap	27,294
173	Baram	26,271
174	Tenom	24,445
175	Bandau	24,287
176	Saratok	23,089
177	Kinabalu	22,612
178	Santubong	21,914
179	Langkawi	21,719
180	Batang Sadong	21,114
181	Kapit	20,859
182	Sipitang	20,609
183	Labuan	20,243
184	Betong	20,006
185	Selangau	19,683
186	Batang Lupar	19,562
187	Kinabatangan	19,162
188	Kanowit	18,049
189	Beluran	17,470
190	Julau	16,198
191	Lubok Antu	16,108
192	Hulu Rajang	15,849

=== 1999 ===
#	1999	
#	Parliamentary constituency	Electorate
1	Ampang Jaya	98,527
2	Serdang	94,839
3	Subang	92,794
4	Shah Alam	92,737
5	Batu Berendam	88,286
6	Tebrau	87,202
7	Selayang	85,571
8	Bayan Baru	84,695
9	Klang	80,673
10	Seremban	80,413
11	Rasah	79,464
12	Johor Bahru	77,837
13	Kota Melaka	76,364
14	Wangsa Maju	75,087
15	Ipoh Timor	74,896
16	Gelang Patah	74,560
17	Kapar	74,502
18	Gombak	73,945
19	Sungai Petani	72,453
20	Taiping	72,130
21	Bagan	72,108
22	Pulai	72,051
23	Seputeh	72,014
24	Ipoh Barat	71,355
25	Hulu Langat	70,819
26	Petaling Jaya Utara	70,634
27	Kuantan	70,438
–	Average: Selangor	70,310
28	Bukit Bendera	69,610
29	Lumut	69,387
30	Miri	68,305
31	Pokok Sena	68,125
32	Petaling Jaya Selatan	67,687
33	Telok Kemang	67,187
34	Bukit Mertajam	66,607
35	Cheras	65,784
36	Kepong	64,956
37	Senai	64,753
38	Pontian	64,557
39	Padang Serai	64,294
40	Batu Pahat	64,048
41	Kluang	63,944
42	Kuala Terengganu	63,893
43	Alor Setar	63,678
44	Merbok	63,665
45	Kampar	63,263
46	Kota Bharu	63,010
47	Bukit Bintang	62,865
–	Average: Malacca	62,735
48	Parit Sulong	62,208
49	Tambun	62,204
50	Balik Pulau	62,075
51	Tanjong	61,260
52	Kuala Kedah	61,114
53	Batu	61,078
54	Segamat	60,782
55	Tawau	60,260
56	Segambut	60,110
–	Average: Johor	59,520
–	Average: Penang	59,416
57	Jelutong	59,372
58	Bandar Tun Razak	59,182
–	Average: Federal Territories	58,999
59	Marang	58,535
–	Average: Negeri Sembilan	57,933
60	Sungai Benut	57,646
61	Kota Tinggi	57,571
62	Kuala Langat	57,430
63	Batu Gajah	57,406
64	Sibu	56,931
65	Pasir Puteh	56,773
66	Bukit Gantang	56,570
67	Ledang	56,531
68	Sri Gading	55,710
69	Gopeng	55,542
70	Telok Intan	55,000
71	Bandar Kuching	54,598
72	Sepang	54,161
73	Baling	53,886
74	Titiwangsa	53,694
75	Temerloh	53,685
76	Tanjong Malim	53,588
77	Pendang	53,388
78	Paya Besar	53,281
79	Nibong Tebal	53,267
80	Bakri	53,251
81	Lembah Pantai	52,607
82	Kuala Selangor	52,469
83	Raub	52,389
84	Hulu Selangor	52,346
85	Bachok	51,363
86	Alor Gajah	51,303
87	Pasir Mas	51,158
88	Stampin	51,050
–	Average: Kedah	51,002
89	Bentong	50,968
–	Average: Perak	50,429
90	Kemaman	50,168
91	Permatang Pauh	49,666
92	Jempol	49,617
93	Selandar	49,558
–	Average: National	49,555
94	Labis	48,674
95	Tenggara	48,461
96	Tumpat	48,419
–	Average: Terengganu	48,417
97	Jasin	48,165
98	Tampin	47,628
–	Average: Pahang	47,534
99	Tambun	47,520
100	Gaya	47,135
101	Kulim-Bandar Baharu	47,093
102	Kubang Pasu	45,925
103	Bintulu	45,920
104	Kubang Kerian	45,897
–	Average: Kelantan	45,840
105	Sandakan	45,645
106	Penampang	45,592
107	Peringat	45,310
108	Dungun	44,911
109	Besut	44,882
110	Rantau Panjang	44,191
111	Kuala Nerus	44,115
112	Jerlun	44,000
113	Kuala Pilah	43,900
114	Mentakab	43,766
115	Pasir Salak	43,288
116	Machang	43,200
117	Bagan Serai	43,084
118	Maran	42,988
119	Beruas	42,959
120	Tanah Merah	42,824
121	Pengkalan Chepa	42,809
122	Jerantut	42,618
123	Lipis	42,585
124	Parit Buntar	42,572
125	Silam	42,341
126	Yan	42,279
127	Tanjong Karang	42,109
128	Setiu	41,898
129	Muar	41,537
130	Tanjong Aru	41,414
131	Semporna	41,300
132	Tapah	40,164
133	Beaufort	40,002
134	Keningau	39,971
135	Pagoh	39,791
136	Mersing	39,286
137	Hulu Terengganu	38,937
138	Kuala Krai	38,887
139	Tasek Gelugor	38,697
140	Lanang	38,177
141	Jeli	38,023
142	Kota Belud	37,484
143	Jelebu	37,322
144	Kangar	37,224
145	Gerik	36,810
146	Kepala Batas	36,215
147	Tuaran	36,085
148	Arau	36,031
–	Average: Sabah	35,957
149	Bagan Datok	35,872
150	Pekan	35,832
151	Larut	35,535
152	Marudu	35,532
–	Average: Perlis	35,244
153	Petra Jaya	35,179
154	Libaran	34,687
155	Chenderoh	34,362
156	Rompin	34,321
157	Bukit Mas	34,226
158	Sabak Bernam	34,035
159	Parit	33,762
160	Sarikei	33,513
161	Mambong	33,225
162	Sik	33,070
163	Kuala Kangsar	32,589
164	Padang Besar	32,478
165	Papar	31,134
–	Average: Sarawak	30,533
166	Serian	30,076
167	Gua Musang	29,890
168	Padang Terap	28,977
169	Kota Samarahan	28,962
170	Sri Aman	28,291
171	Kuala Rajang	27,647
172	Tenom	27,477
173	Mas Gading	26,721
174	Kinabalu	25,538
175	Bandau	25,422
176	Mukah	25,390
177	Baram	24,842
178	Saratok	23,611
179	Langkawi	23,081
180	Sipitang	22,084
181	Kapit	21,934
182	Labuan	21,611
183	Kinabatangan	21,438
184	Santubong	21,057
185	Betong	19,885
186	Selangau	19,689
187	Beluran	18,590
188	Batang Lupar	18,917
188	Kanowit	18,168
190	Julau	18,141
191	Batang Sadong	18,034
192	Lubok Antu	16,405
193	Hulu Rajang	16,018

=== 1974 ===
#	1974	
#	Parliamentary constituency	Electorate
1	Ipoh	51,569
2	Menglembu	51,316
3	Petaling	48,100
4	Tanjong	46,719
5	Kota Melaka	46,609
6	Kinta	46,307
7	Kuala Lumpur Bandar	46,289
8	Johore Bahru	45,402
9	Jelutong	44,594
10	Shah Alam	42,696
11	Selayang	42,662
12	Setapak	42,584
13	Sungei Besi	42,446
14	Seremban	41,671
15	Bukit Bendera	41,033
–	Average: Federal Territory	40,767
16	Muar	40,350
17	Alor Setar	39,088
18	Kota Bharu	38,958
–	Average: Malacca	38,253
19	Damansara	38,028
20	Batu Gajah	37,809
21	Batu Berendam	37,148
22	Sungei Patani	36,700
23	Taiping	36,394
24	Alor Gajah	35,663
25	Batu Pahat	34,853
26	Renggam	34,762
27	Tumpat	34,719
28	Kepong	34,488
29	Jasin	33,591
30	Kuala Kedah	33,457
31	Kubang Pasu	33,258
32	Pelabohan Kelang	33,208
33	Pontian	33,156
34	Kuala Trengganu	32,771
35	Baling	32,738
36	Pasir Mas	32,680
–	Average: Penang	32,664
37	Bachok	32,252
38	Pulai	32,236
39	Tampin	31,889
40	Parit Buntar	31,734
41	Kluang	31,687
42	Mata Kuching	31,385
43	Pengkalan Chepa	31,042
–	Average: Selangor	31,023
44	Kuantan	30,991
45	Balik Pulau	30,787
–	Average: Kedah	30,563
–	Average: Negri Sembilan	30,168
46	Nilam Puri	30,116
–	Average: Perak	30,040
47	Bagan Serai	29,919
48	Segamat	29,896
49	Semerah	29,846
–	Average: Johore	29,704
50	Kuala Muda	29,599
51	Lumut	29,263
52	Parit	29,250
53	Telok Anson	29,089
54	Arau	28,961
–	Average: Perlis	28,943
55	Kangar	28,924
56	Bukit Mertajam	28,902
57	Telok Kemang	28,831
58	Temerloh	28,790
59	Jerlun-Langkawi	28,756
60	Jerai	28,704
61	Padang Terap	28,348
62	Pasir Puteh	28,278
63	Bandar Kuching	28,175
–	Average: Kelantan	28,068
64	Kuala Langat	28,026
65	Ulu Selangor	27,973
66	Kulim-Bandar Bahru	27,940
67	Besut	27,810
68	Bagan Datok	27,630
69	Kuala Selangor	27,578
70	Kota Setar	27,565
71	Bentong	27,378
72	Lipis	27,363
73	Kuala Pilah	27,151
74	Mantin	26,777
75	Tanjong Malim	26,757
76	Ulu Muda	26,625
77	Matang	26,611
78	Hilir Perak	26,524
79	Ledang	26,433
–	Average: National	26,392
80	Kemaman	26,373
–	Average: Trengganu	26,246
–	Average: Pahang	25,974
81	Sri Gading	25,972
82	Nibong Tebal	25,771
83	Kuala Nerus	25,535
84	Machang	25,386
85	Dungun	25,192
86	Rantau Panjang	24,974
87	Ayer Hitam	24,845
88	Jelebu	24,690
89	Jerantut	24,662
90	Labis	24,607
91	Padang Serai	24,542
92	Pagoh	24,346
93	Raub	24,325
94	Tanjong Karang	24,227
95	Ulu Nerus	24,095
96	Miri-Subis	24,058
97	Sungei Siput	23,795
98	Bruas	23,544
99	Tanah Merah	23,023
100	Pekan	22,957
101	Kepala Batas	22,843
102	Padang Rengas	22,680
103	Sabak Bernam	22,474
104	Ulu Langat	22,289
105	Batang Padang	22,098
106	Sepang	22,025
107	Ulu Trengganu	21,949
108	Permatang Pauh	21,942
109	Kuala Kangsar	21,720
110	Maran	21,326
111	Gaya	20,903
112	Larut	20,424
113	Santubong	20,149
114	Bandar Sibu	19,601
115	Panti	19,595
116	Serian	18,905
117	Kuala Krai	18,650
118	Batang Lupar	18,518
119	Sandakan	18,195
120	Mukah	18,148
121	Bau-Lundu	17,500
122	Tenggaroh	17,274
123	Payang	16,837
124	Ulu Kelantan	16,765
125	Grik	16,407
126	Penampang	16,092
–	Average: Sarawak	15,662
127	Bintulu	15,636
128	Padawan	15,318
129	Baram	15,218
130	Hilir Padas	15,112
131	Kota Belud	15,097
132	Rajang	14,667
133	Kimanis	14,457
134	Betong	14,348
135	Tuaran	14,242
136	Silam	14,241
137	Marudi	14,197
–	Average: Sabah	14,109
138	Tawau	13,735
139	Samarahan	13,588
140	Limbang-Lawas	13,548
141	Saratok	13,163
142	Simunjan	13,126
143	Keningau	12,816
144	Kinabalu	12,814
145	Sarikei	12,496
146	Kapit	12,262
147	Bandau	11,968
148	Ulu Padas	10,977
149	Kinabatangan	10,969
150	Ulu Rajang	10,903
151	Kanowit	10,825
152	Labuk-Sugut	9,930
153	Lubok Antu	9,703
154	Julau	9,190

=== 1978 ===
#	1978	
#	Parliamentary constituency	Electorate
	Petaling	90,611
	Selayang	81,350
	Sungei Besi	79,076
	Johore Bahru	75,186
	Shah Alam	71,398
	Damansara	67,278
	Kepong	63,703
	Ipoh	63,408
	Menglembu	61,439
	Jelutong	60,248
	Kota Melaka	60,086
	Kinta	57,661
	Bukit Bendera	55,860
	Seremban	52,924
	Tanjong	51,930
	Kuala Lumpur Bandar	51,726
	Pelabohan Kelang	49,979
	Muar	49,897
	Mata Kuching	47,425
	Alor Setar	47,355
	Taiping	47,154
–	Average: Selangor	46,863
	Sungai Petani	45,855
	Pulai	45,834
	Renggam	45,340
	Kluang	44,331
–	Average: Penang	42,570
	Balik Pulau	42,176
	Batu Gajah	41,835
	Alor Gajah	41,663
	Pontian	41,615
	Bukit Mertajam	41,243
	Kota Bharu	41,162
	Kuala Kedah	40,445
	Jasin	40,092
	Tampin	39,535
	Kuantan	38,229
	Temerloh	37,758
	Ulu Langat	37,702
	Kuala Trengganu	37,504
	Baling	37,072
	Kubang Pasu	37,022
	Bandar Kuching	36,527
	Kangar	35,625
	Semerah	35,546
	Segamat	35,493
–	Average: Kedah	35,484
–	Average: Perak	35,093
	Parit Buntar	34,991
	Ulu Selangor	34,744
	Tumpat	34,667
	Mantin	34,650
	Telok Anson	34,585
	Kuala Muda	34,354
–	Average: Perlis	34,286
	Bagan Serai	33,863
	Lumut	33,663
	Bentong	33,656
	Telok Kemang	33,512
	Jerlun-Langkawi	33,416
	Maran	33,195
	Padang Terap	33,019
	Kuala Selangor	33,012
	Arau	32,947
	Panti	32,767
	Jerai	32,536
–	Average: Pahang	32,253
	Gaya	32,092
	Matang	31,967
	Kulim-Bandar Baru	31,816
	Tanjong Malim	31,785
	Parit	31,667
	Tanjong Karang	31,403
	Kota Setar	31,351
	Bachok	31,256
	Ayer Hitam	31,251
	Lipis	30,992
	Bagan Datok	30,989
	Pasir Mas	30,972
	Kemaman	30,872
	Nilam Puri	30,765
	Nibong Tebal	30,467
	Jerantut	30,402
	Labis	30,305
	Besut	30,220
	Lambir	30,026
	Hilir Perak	29,838
	Kuala Pilah	29,758
	Sri Gading	29,558
	Padang Serai	29,444
	Kuala Langat	29,277
	Pengkalan Chepa	29,156
	Pasir Puteh	29,002
	Ledang	28,714
	Sibu	28,519
–	Average: Kelantan	28,345
	Sabak Bernam	28,163
	Sungei Siput	27,922
	Sepang	27,858
	Ulu Muda	27,605
	Ulu Nerus	27,565
	Permatang Pauh	27,516
	Bruas	27,109
	Raub	26,973
	Pekan	26,819
	Dungun	26,704
	Pagoh	26,302
	Kepala Batas	26,269
	Sandakan	26,236
	Santubong	26,140
	Batang Padang	25,914
	Ulu Trengganu	25,711
	Machang	25,709
	Padang Rengas	24,227
	Kuala Kangsar	23,958
	Tanah Merah	23,500
	Rantau Panjang	23,207
	Serian	22,052
	Larut	21,997
	Batang Lupar	21,076
	Ulu Kelantan	21,048
	Grik	20,991
	Tawau	20,978
	Mas Gading	20,628
	Hilir Padas	20,406
	Tenggaroh	20,308
	Sarikei	20,089
	Kuala Krai	19,697
	Silam	19,445
	Penampang	19,227
	Rajang	17,968
	Kota Belud	17,960
	Marudu	17,523
	Mukah	17,469
	Bintulu	17,420
	Kimanis	17,365
	Keningau	17,210
	Tuaran	17,109
	Betong	16,064
	Kinabalu	15,845
	Paloh	15,105
	Saratok	14,550
	Labuk-Sugut	14,307
	Bandau	13,788
	Kapit	13,359
	Kinabatangan	12,878
	Simunjan	12,779
	Samarahan	12,475
	Kanowit	11,743
	Ulu Rajang	11,385
	Lubok Antu	10,386
	Julau	9,585
	Baram	?
	Batu Berendam	?
	Batu Pahat	?
	Bukit Mas	?
	Jelebu	?
	Kuala Nerus	?
	Padawan	?
	Setapak	?
	Ulu Padas	?

=== 1982 ===
#	1982	
#	Parliamentary constituency	Electorate
1	Petaling	114,704
2	Selayang	113,159
3	Sungei Besi	103,469
4	Shah Alam	101,192
5	Johore Bahru	98,505
6	Damansara	86,576
–	Average: Federal Territory	81,356
7	Setapak	80,266
8	Kepong	77,285
9	Ipoh	76,613
10	Menglembu	72,307
11	Jelutong	71,093
12	Kota Melaka	69,900
13	Kinta	69,362
14	Bukit Bendera	67,261
15	Pulai	61,303
16	Pelabohan Kelang	61,113
17	Seremban	60,739
18	Kuala Lumpur Bandar	59,186
–	Average: Selangor	58,887
19	Tanjong	58,735
20	Alor Setar	58,456
21	Muar	57,997
22	Mata Kuching	57,635
23	Sungei Patani	56,093
24	Renggam	54,815
–	Average: Malacca	54,809
25	Kluang	54,717
26	Batu Berendam	54,311
27	Taiping	54,176
28	Bukit Mertajam	53,324
29	Balik Pulau	52,485
–	Average: Penang	51,154
30	Kota Bharu	50,238
31	Panti	50,024
32	Pontian	49,909
33	Tampin	49,248
34	Batu Pahat	48,552
35	Alor Gajah	48,437
36	Batu Gajah	47,717
–	Average: Johore	47,365
37	Bandar Kuching	47,201
38	Kuantan	47,137
39	Temerloh	46,891
40	Jasin	46,588
41	Kuala Kedah	46,123
42	Ulu Langat	46,033
43	Maran	45,042
44	Kuala Trengganu	43,956
–	Average: Negri Sembilan	43,605
45	Kubang Pasu	43,583
46	Kangar	41,983
47	Semerah	41,721
–	Average: Kedah	41,686
48	Baling	41,626
49	Segamat	41,273
50	Mantin	41,244
–	Average: Pahang	40,729
51	Jerantut	40,514
52	Tumpat	40,502
–	Average: Perak	40,423
53	Telok Anson	40,382
54	Ulu Selangor	40,289
55	Bentong	40,222
56	Kuala Muda	39,810
57	Gaya	39,606
–	Average: Perlis	39,509
–	Average: National	39,491
58	Lambir	39,370
59	Sibu	39,032
60	Telok Kemang	38,975
61	Jerlun-Langkawi	38,958
62	Tanjong Malim	38,836
63	Padang Terap	38,831
64	Jelebu	38,733
65	Lumut	38,699
66	Pekan	38,260
67	Parit Buntar	38,219
68	Ayer Hitam	37,778
69	Bachok	37,586
70	Kuala Selangor	37,579
71	Pasir Mas	37,382
72	Kota Setar	37,073
73	Arau	37,035
74	Jerai	36,957
75	Labis	36,950
76	Besut	36,741
77	Pengkalan Chepa	36,716
78	Kemaman	36,467
79	Kulim-Bandar Bahru	36,399
80	Bagan Serai	36,338
81	Lipis	36,337
82	Kuala Langat	36,225
83	Parit	36,187
84	Nibong Tebal	35,995
85	Nilam Puri	35,958
86	Sri Gading	35,727
87	Matang	35,162
88	Bagan Datok	35,028
–	Average: Kelantan	34,854
–	Average: Trengganu	34,585
89	Ulu Muda	34,203
90	Pasir Puteh	34,084
91	Sepang	33,936
92	Padang Serai	33,812
93	Ledang	33,496
94	Tanjong Karang	33,304
95	Kuala Nerus	33,269
96	Hilir Perak	32,925
97	Kuala Pilah	32,693
98	Permatang Pauh	32,378
99	Sungei Siput	32,360
100	Ulu Kelantan	32,350
101	Ulu Nerus	31,612
102	Kepala Batas	31,481
103	Raub	31,428
104	Bruas	31,391
105	Sandakan	31,239
106	Dungun	31,064
107	Tanah Merah	31,047
108	Pagoh	30,617
109	Santubong	30,261
110	Sabak Bernam	30,227
111	Machang	29,441
112	Batang Padang	29,255
113	Ulu Trengganu	28,983
114	Rantau Panjang	28,493
115	Tawau	28,381
116	Silam	27,138
117	Padang Rengas	26,631
118	Kuala Kangsar	26,535
119	Padawan	26,453
120	Larut	25,253
121	Grik	25,509
122	Serian	25,483
123	Tenggaroh	24,453
124	Kuala Krai	24,445
125	Hilir Padas	23,700
126	Penampang	23,404
127	Mas Gading	23,398
128	Batang Lupar	23,127
129	Sarikei	23,093
–	Average: Sabah	22,413
130	Kota Belud	21,732
–	Average: Sarawak	21,391
131	Marudu	20,586
132	Bintulu	19,859
133	Keningau	19,755
134	Tuaran	19,739
135	Kimanis	19,679
136	Rajang	18,967
137	Baram	18,921
138	Kinabalu	18,583
139	Bukit Mas	18,356
140	Mukah	18,207
141	Betong	17,870
142	Lubok Antu	17,350
143	Paloh	17,193
144	Bandau	16,055
145	Saratok	15,929
146	Ulu Padas	15,835
147	Kinabatangan	15,827
148	Kapit	14,555
149	Simunjan	14,547
150	Samarahan	13,847
151	Kanowit	12,784
152	Ulu Rajang	12,476
153	Lubok Antu	11,739
154	Julau	10,724

=== 1955 ===
#	1955	
#	Federal constituency	Electorate
1	Kelantan Timor	46,235
2	Kelantan Tengah	43,277
3	Kelantan Utara	42,554
–	Average: Kelantan	41,180
4	Kelantan Selatan	39,032
5	Malacca Luar	37,675
6	Kedah Tengah	37,219
7	Trengganu Utara	35,355
8	Alor Star	35,264
9	Pasir Mas	34,803
10	Muar Selatan	34,436
11	Kota Star	34,048
12	Kedah Utara	33,972
13	Trengganu Tengah	33,747
–	Average: Malacca	32,354
–	Average: Kedah	32,311
14	Larut-Matang	31,072
–	Average: Trengganu	30,983
–	Average: Perlis	30,936
15	Perlis	30,936
16	Krian	30,339
17	Sungei Perak Ulu	29,665
18	Muar Utara	29,272
19	Johore Selatan	29,090
20	Wellesley North	28,190
21	Sungei Muda	27,435
22	Penang Island	27,336
23	Malacca Central	27,033
24	Batu Pahat	26,921
25	Negri Sembilan Utara	26,664
26	Sungei Perak Hilir	26,038
27	Kedah Selatan	25,927
–	Average: Penang- Province Wellesley	24,695
–	Average: National	24,632
28	Trengganu Selatan	23,846
29	Wellesley South	23,238
30	Ulu Pahang	22,811
31	Pahang Timor	22,425
–	Average: Johore	22,264
–	Average: Pahang	21,747
32	Kuala Selangor	21,506
–	Average: Perak	20,647
33	George Town	20,016
34	Semantan	20,004
–	Average: Negri Sembilan	19,439
35	Negri Sembilan Selatan	18,677
36	Telok Anson	18,154
37	Segamat	17,482
38	Dindings	16,464
39	Kinta Selatan	16,295
40	Johore Bahru	15,042
41	Batang Padang	14,355
42	Johore Timor	14,155
43	Selangor Barat	13,844
44	Kuala Lumpur Timor	13,209
45	Seremban	12,977
46	Kinta Utara	12,474
–	Average: Selangor	12,226
47	Johore Tengah	11,716
48	Ipoh-Menglembu	11,610
49	Langat	10,840
50	Selangor Tengah	9,468
51	Kuala Lumpur Barat	8,875
52	Ulu Selangor	7,837

=== 1959 ===
#	1959	
#	Parliamentary constituency	Electorate
1	Bangsar	35,549
2	Menglembu	33,609
3	Larut Selatan	32,633
4	Penang Selatan	30,903
5	Ipoh	30,457
6	Tanjong	28,086
7	Kota Bharu Hulu	27,421
8	Seberang Tengah	26,773
9	Kampar	26,559
10	Kuala Kangsar	26,466
11	Pasir Puteh	26,326
12	Kuala Kedah	25,946
13	Tanah Merah	25,793
14	Muar Selatan	25,706
15	Alor Star	25,540
16	Penang Utara	25,537
17	Sitiawan	25,531
18	Bachok	25,382
19	Bukit Bintang	24,984
20	Malacca Selatan	24,975
21	Larut Utara	24,864
22	Jerai	24,820
23	Bruas	24,383
24	Tumpat	24,383
25	Kota Bharu Hilir	24,178
–	Average: Kelantan	24,055
26	Kelantan Hilir	23,975
–	Average: Penang	23,566
27	Malacca Tengah	23,495
–	Average: Malacca	23,434
28	Kulim-Bandar Bahru	23,264
29	Baling	23,043
30	Seberang Utara	22,978
31	Malacca Utara	22,930
32	Muar Pantai	22,884
33	Batu Pahat Dalam	22,842
34	Ulu Kelantan	22,839
35	Telok Anson	22,762
36	Kuala Pilah	22,673
37	Kedah Tengah	22,672
38	Jitra-Padang Terap	22,576
–	Average: Perak	22,505
39	Setapak	22,490
40	Krian Laut	22,409
41	Pontian Utara	22,341
42	Bandar Malacca	22,337
–	Average: Kedah	22,335
43	Dato' Kramat	22,058
44	Pasir Mas Hilir	21,891
45	Lipis	21,634
46	Muar Utara	21,510
47	Ulu Perak	21,430
48	Besut	21,399
49	Krian Darat	21,248
50	Batu Pahat	21,090
51	Kota Star Selatan	21,069
52	Batu Gajah	21,006
53	Jelebu-Jempol	20,940
–	Average: National	20,939
54	Batu	20,819
55	Trengganu Tengah	20,765
56	Temerloh	20,718
57	Kota Star Utara	20,053
58	Muar Dalam	20,050
59	Sungei Patani	20,031
60	Kuala Trengganu Utara	19,994
61	Damansara	19,722
62	Kulim Utara	19,708
63	Klang	19,670
64	Perlis Utara	19,560
–	Average: Selangor	19,383
65	Kubang Pasu Barat	19,303
66	Tanjong Malim	19,274
67	Kuala Trengganu Selatan	19,247
–	Average: Perlis	19,178
–	Average: Trengganu	19,150
68	Kuala Selangor	19,026
69	Parit	18,945
70	Sabak Bernam	18,892
71	Perlis Selatan	18,795
72	Pontian Selatan	18,753
73	Seremban Timor	18,678
74	Rembau-Tampin	18,571
–	Average: Negri Sembilan	18,556
75	Bagan Datoh	18,545
76	Pasir Mas Hulu	18,364
–	Average: Pahang	18,256
–	Average: Johore	18,202
77	Ulu Kinta	18,147
78	Bentong	17,829
79	Kemaman	17,734
80	Raub	17,359
81	Sungei Siput	17,175
82	Kuala Langat	17,169
83	Kluang Selatan	16,880
84	Bagan	16,698
85	Batang Padang	16,667
86	Kuantan	16,552
87	Seberang Selatan	15,920
88	Johore Bahru Barat	15,899
89	Langat	15,890
90	Port Dickson	15,763
91	Dungun	15,759
92	Segamat Selatan	15,548
93	Johore Bahru Timor	15,518
94	Pekan	15,443
95	Kapar	15,152
96	Segamat Utara	15,044
97	Seremban Barat	14,741
98	Rawang	14,378
99	Ulu Selangor	14,274
100	Kluang Utara	13,583
101	Sepang	13,345
102	Hilir Perak	12,984
103	Johore Timor	12,196
104	Johore Tenggara	10,986

=== 1964 ===
#	1964	
#	Parliamentary constituency	Electorate
1	Bangsar	58,261
2	Menglembu	46,031
3	Larut Selatan	40,466
4	Penang Selatan	40,324
5	Penang Utara	39,038
6	Setapak	37,376
7	Seberang Tengah	35,771
8	Tanjong	34,730
9	Kampar	34,274
10	Alor Star	33,758
11	Bukit Bintang	33,636
12	Ipoh	33,295
13	Bandar Malacca	33,147
14	Malacca Selatan	32,415
15	Batu	32,297
16	Baling	31,820
–	Average: Penang	31,655
–	Average: Malacca	31,393
17	Dato' Kramat	31,246
18	Tanah Merah	31,245
19	Kota Bharu Hilir	30,955
20	Malacca Tengah	30,568
21	Kulim-Bandar Bahru	30,332
22	Klang	30,158
23	Muar Pantai	30,151
24	Muar Selatan	30,094
25	Damansara	30,093
26	Kota Bharu Hulu	29,990
27	Kuala Kedah	29,872
28	Kedah Tengah	29,829
29	Kuala Kangsar	29,734
30	Ulu Kelantan	29,483
31	Jitra-Padang Terap	29,464
32	Malacca Utara	29,443
33	Telok Anson	29,009
34	Seremban Timor	29,001
35	Batu Pahat Dalam	28,461
36	Jerai	28,271
37	Seberang Utara	28,143
–	Average: Kedah	28,072
–	Average: Selangor	27,756
38	Lipis	27,447
39	Besut	27,420
–	Average: Kelantan	27,176
40	Sungei Patani	27,156
41	Jelebu-Jempol	27,140
42	Larut Utara	27,068
43	Pasir Puteh	27,045
44	Muar Utara	27,025
45	Temerloh	26,899
–	Average: National	26,561
46	Bachok	26,275
47	Bruas	26,274
–	Average: Perak	26,208
48	Kuala Pilah	26,137
49	Pontian Utara	26,098
50	Kota Star Selatan	25,898
51	Tumpat	25,890
52	Trengganu Tengah	25,778
53	Krian Laut	25,662
54	Kelantan Hilir	25,451
–	Average: Negri Sembilan	25,349
55	Batu Pahat	25,344
56	Bentong	25,145
57	Kuala Selangor	24,882
58	Seremban Barat	24,758
59	Krian Darat	24,743
60	Johore Bahru Timor	24,734
61	Kuala Trengganu Utara	24,734
62	Pasir Mas Hilir	24,662
63	Pontian Selatan	24,569
–	Average: Trengganu	24,195
64	Kuala Trengganu Selatan	24,168
65	Kulim Utara	24,125
66	Kota Star Utara	23,982
67	Batu Gajah	23,741
68	Sitiawan	23,741
–	Average: Pahang	23,574
–	Average: Johore	23,562
69	Perlis Utara	23,379
–	Average: Perlis	23,246
70	Ulu Perak	23,179
71	Perlis Selatan	23,112
72	Kluang Selatan	23,051
73	Rembau-Tampin	22,997
74	Bagan	22,792
75	Bagan Datoh	22,771
76	Kapar	22,730
77	Muar Dalam	22,724
78	Segamat Selatan	22,646
79	Johore Bahru Barat	22,493
80	Sabak Bernam	22,367
81	Kubang Pasu Barat	22,351
82	Parit	22,296
83	Port Dickson	22,062
84	Kemaman	21,953
85	Kuantan	21,888
86	Kluang Utara	21,731
87	Raub	21,579
88	Seberang Selatan	21,195
89	Dungun	21,118
90	Kuala Langat	21,105
91	Tanjong Malim	20,880
92	Pasir Mas Hulu	20,766
93	Segamat Utara	20,025
94	Rawang	19,951
95	Ulu Kinta	19,773
96	Langat	19,403
97	Sepang	18,581
98	Pekan	18,485
99	Sungei Siput	17,791
100	Ulu Selangor	17,750
101	Batang Padang	17,605
102	Hilir Perak	15,834
103	Johore Timor	14,991
104	Johore Tenggara	12,854

=== 1969 ===
#	1969	
#	Parliamentary constituency	Electorate
1	Bangsar	81,086
2	Setapak	57,969
3	Menglembu	51,913
4	Bukit Bintang	50,631
5	Batu	50,183
6	Larut Selatan	47,472
7	Penang Selatan	47,464
8	Penang Utara	47,083
9	Bandar Malacca	42,679
10	Damansara	41,331
11	Seberang Tengah	41,319
12	Ipoh	40,718
13	Kampar	40,527
14	Kota Bharu Hilir	39,478
15	Tanah Merah	38,999
16	Alor Star	38,631
17	Ulu Kelantan	38,560
–	Average: Malacca	36,941
–	Average: Selangor	36,927
18	Kuala Kedah	36,874
19	Malacca Selatan	36,232
20	Baling	36,210
21	Jitra-Padang Terap	35,697
22	Malacca Tengah	35,617
23	Besut	35,522
24	Telok Anson	35,475
25	Kedah Tengah	35,302
–	Average: Penang	35,300
26	Muar Selatan	34,963
27	Kota Bharu Hulu	34,693
28	Klang	34,235
29	Tanjong	33,747
30	Pasir Puteh	33,603
–	Average: Kelantan	33,375
31	Malacca Utara	33,237
32	Kuala Kangsar	33,067
33	Temerloh	33,066
34	Batu Pahat Dalam	32,664
35	Lipis	32,390
36	Seberang Utara	32,369
–	Average: Kedah	32,347
37	Seremban Timor	32,222
38	Kota Star Selatan	31,995
39	Jerai	31,829
40	Larut Utara	31,664
41	Trengganu Tengah	31,316
42	Bachok	31,293
43	Kluang Selatan	31,171
44	Tumpat	31,115
45	Kelantan Hilir	31,060
46	Dato' Kramat	31,053
–	Average: Perak	30,679
47	Muar Pantai	30,558
48	Krian Laut	30,485
49	Kulim-Bandar Bahru	30,274
50	Muar Utara	30,264
51	Kuala Trengganu Utara	30,187
52	Kuantan	30,154
–	Average: Trengganu	29,894
53	Segamat Selatan	29,730
54	Jelebu-Jempol	29,720
55	Pontian Utara	29,663
56	Kota Star Utara	29,646
57	Pasir Mas Hilir	29,556
58	Sabak Bernam	29,545
59	Krian Darat	29,507
–	Average: Pahang	29,461
60	Kuala Trengganu Selatan	29,457
61	Bruas	29,421
62	Raub	29,327
63	Johore Bahru Timor	28,729
64	Sungei Patani	28,595
65	Muar Dalam	28,523
–	Average: Negri Sembilan	28,455
66	Bentong	28,187
67	Perlis Selatan	28,128
–	Average: Perlis	28,030
68	Perlis Utara	27,932
69	Sitiawan	27,930
70	Pontian Selatan	27,924
71	Seremban Barat	27,900
–	Average: Johore	27,289
72	Kubang Pasu Barat	27,275
73	Rembau-Tampin	27,145
74	Kuala Pilah	27,118
75	Batu Gajah	27,081
76	Batu Pahat	27,010
77	Kemaman	26,953
–	Average: National	26,693
78	Ulu Perak	26,684
79	Port Dickson	26,623
80	Kapar	26,368
81	Tanjong Malim	26,295
82	Bagan Datoh	26,237
83	Dungun	25,930
84	Kulim Utara	25,839
85	Pasir Mas Hulu	25,397
86	Kluang Utara	25,334
87	Parit	25,268
88	Kuala Langat	24,973
89	Bandar Kuching	24,877
90	Bagan	24,793
91	Rawang	24,765
92	Seberang Selatan	24,573
93	Ulu Kinta	24,475
94	Pekan	23,644
95	Langat	23,142
96	Segamat Utara	21,802
97	Sungei Siput	21,702
98	Johore Bahru Barat	21,162
99	Sepang	20,884
100	Ulu Selangor	20,845
101	Batang Padang	19,946
102	Bandar Sibu	18,779
103	Johore Timor	18,302
104	Santubong	17,746
105	Hilir Perak	17,705
106	Batang Lupar	17,476
107	Kuala Selangor	17,344
108	Serian	16,359
109	Mukah	15,798
110	Penampang	15,512
111	Bau-Lundu	15,424
112	Kota Kinabalu	15,291
113	Payang	15,263
114	Kimanis	15,193
115	Kota Belud	14,875
116	Marudu	14,086
117	Padawan	13,909
–	Average: Sarawak	13,864
118	Tuaran	13,826
119	Johore Tenggara	13,821
120	Darvel	13,788
121	Rajang	13,511
122	Labuan-Beaufort	13,182
123	Betong	13,092
–	Average: Sabah	13,054
124	Sabah Dalam	12,889
125	Samarahan	12,820
126	Sandakan	12,625
127	Kinabalu	12,387
128	Sarikei	11,957
129	Saratok	11,892
130	Labuk-Sugut	11,742
131	Kinabatangan	11,672
132	Simunjan	11,553
133	Sabah Selatan	11,062
134	Bandau	10,933
135	Kapit	10,521
136	Kanowit	10,224
137	Tawau	9,798
138	Lubok Antu	8,914
139	Julau	7,640
	Baram	?
	Bintulu	?
	Limbang-Lawas	?
	Miri-Subis	?
	Ulu Rajang	?

== See also ==
- List of Malaysian electoral districts
- List of former Malaysian federal electoral districts
- List of Malayan federal electoral districts 1955–59
