= Muar (federal constituency) =

Federal constituency in Johor, Malaysia

Muar (P146)
Johor constituency

Federal constituency
- Legislature: Dewan Rakyat
- MP: Syed Saddiq Syed Abdul Rahman; MUDA
- Constituency created: 1974
- First contested: 1974
- Last contested: 2022

Demographics
- Population (2020): 100,265
- Electors (2026): 71,079
- Area (km²): 268
- Pop. density (per km²): 374.1

Muar is a federal constituency in Muar District, Johor, Malaysia, that has been represented in the Dewan Rakyat since 1974.

The federal constituency was created in the 1974 redistribution and is mandated to return a single member to the Dewan Rakyat under the first-past-the-post voting system.

== Demographics ==
Ethnic breakdown of Muar's electorate as of 2022
1. Malay (67.2%)
2. Chinese (32.3%)
3. Indian (0.30%)
4. Other ethnicities (0.30%)

As of 2020, Muar has a population of 100,265 people.

Age breakdown of Muar's electorate as of 2022
1. 18-20 (5.86%)
2. 21-29 (20.9%)
3. 30-39 (21.6%)
4. 40-49 (16.9%)
5. 50-59 (14.3%)
6. 60-69 (11.4%)
7. 70-79 (5.95%)
8. 80-89 (2.46%)
9. above 90 (0.59%)
Gender breakdown of Muar's electorate as of 2022
1. Male (49.6%)
2. Female (50.4%)

== History ==
=== Polling districts ===
According to the federal gazette issued on 2 July 2026, the Muar constituency has a total of 33 polling districts.

State constituency	Polling Districts	Code	Location
Maharani（N15）	Maharani	146/15/01	SMK Sri Muar
Maharani（N15）	Tanjong	146/15/02	SMK (P) Sultan Abu Bakar
Maharani（N15）	Tanjong Selatan	146/15/03	SMA Maahad Muar
Maharani（N15）	Jalan Khalidi	146/15/04	SJK (T) Jalan Khalidi
Maharani（N15）	Temenggong Ahmad Selatan	146/15/05	SK Ismail Satu
Maharani（N15）	Parit Perupok Timor	146/15/06	SK Parit Kadzi
Maharani（N15）	Parit Perupok Barat	146/15/07	SJK (C) Chung Hwa Ketiga
Maharani（N15）	Parit Keroma	146/15/08	SK Parit Keruma
Maharani（N15）	Parit Raja	146/15/09	SMK Tengku Mahkota
Maharani（N15）	Parit Bakar Darat	146/15/10	SJK (C) Chi Sin
Maharani（N15）	Parit Bakar	146/15/11	SK Parit Bakar Tengah
Maharani（N15）	Parit Unas	146/15/12	SJK (C) San Chai
Maharani（N15）	Parit Pinang Seribu	146/15/13	SK Parit Pinang Seribu
Maharani（N15）	Parit Samsu	146/15/14	SK Parit Samsu
Sungai Balang (N16)	Parit Shafiee	146/16/01	Balai Raya Kampung Parit Salman; Balai Raya Kampung Parit Shafiee
Sungai Balang (N16)	Parit Kassim	146/16/02	SJK (C) Limbong
Sungai Balang (N16)	Bukit Mor	146/16/03	SJK (C) Hwa Ming
Sungai Balang (N16)	Parit Nawee	146/16/04	SK Parit Nawi
Sungai Balang (N16)	Bandar Parit Jawa Utara	146/16/05	SK Parit Jawa
Sungai Balang (N16)	Bandar Parit Jawa Selatan	146/16/06	SJK (C) Chin Kwang Wahyu
Sungai Balang (N16)	Parit Jawa	146/16/07	SMK Raja Muda
Sungai Balang (N16)	Parit Tengah	146/16/08	SK Sri Jamil
Sungai Balang (N16)	Parit Jamil Darat	146/16/09	SK Simpang 4
Sungai Balang (N16)	Parit Pechah	146/16/10	SMK Sri Menanti
Sungai Balang (N16)	Sri Menanti	146/16/11	SK Seri Menanti
Sungai Balang (N16)	Sungai Sudah	146/16/12	SK Tanjong Tohor
Sungai Balang (N16)	Sungai Balang	146/16/13	SK Orangkaya Ali
Sungai Balang (N16)	Sungai Balang Besar	146/16/14	SK Jalan Yusof
Sungai Balang (N16)	Sungai Balang Darat	146/16/15	SK Sg Balang Darat
Sungai Balang (N16)	Sarang Buaya Darat	146/16/16	SK Parit Latiff
Sungai Balang (N16)	Parit Yusof	146/16/17	SMK Pekan Baru Muar
Sungai Balang (N16)	Sarang Buaya Laut	146/16/18	SJK (C) Pei Chun
Sungai Balang (N16)	Kampong Parit Bulat	146/16/19	SK Parit Bulat

=== Representation history ===
Members of Parliament for Muar
Parliament	No	Years	Member	Party	Vote Share
Constituency created from Muar Dalam, Muar Pantai and Muar Selatan
4th	P106	1974–1978	Neo Yee Pan (梁维泮)	BN (MCA)	23,039; 80.52%
5th	P106	1978–1982	Neo Yee Pan (梁维泮)	BN (MCA)	23,538; 63.40%
6th	P106	1982–1986	Neo Yee Pan (梁维泮)	BN (MCA)	27,572; 66.58%
7th	P123	1986–1990	Mohamed Sam Sailan (محمد سم ساءيلن)	BN (UMNO)	17,801; 77.58%
8th	P123	1990–1995	Abdul Malek Munip (عبدالمالك مونيڤ)	BN (UMNO)	13,760; 55.39%
9th	P133	1995–1999	Abdul Aziz Yassin (عبدالعزيز محمد. يسٓ)	BN (UMNO)	18,238; 67.57%
10th	P133	1999–2004	Robia Kosai (روبيا كوساي)	BN (UMNO)	17,693; 62.73%
11th	P146	2004–2008	Razali Ibrahim (غزالي إبراهيم)	BN (UMNO)	21,116; 73.28%
12th	P146	2008–2013	Razali Ibrahim (غزالي إبراهيم)	BN (UMNO)	16,986; 57.95%
13th	P146	2013–2018	Razali Ibrahim (غزالي إبراهيم)	BN (UMNO)	20,867; 52.02%
14th	P146	2018–2020	Syed Saddiq Syed Abdul Rahman (سيد صادق سيد عبدالرحمن)	PH (BERSATU)	22,341; 53.09%
14th	P146	2020	Syed Saddiq Syed Abdul Rahman (سيد صادق سيد عبدالرحمن)	BERSATU	22,341; 53.09%
14th	P146	2021	Syed Saddiq Syed Abdul Rahman (سيد صادق سيد عبدالرحمن)	Independent	22,341; 53.09%
14th	P146	2021–2022	Syed Saddiq Syed Abdul Rahman (سيد صادق سيد عبدالرحمن)	MUDA	22,341; 53.09%
15th	P146	2022–present	Syed Saddiq Syed Abdul Rahman (سيد صادق سيد عبدالرحمن)	MUDA	19,961; 37.55%

=== State constituency ===
Parliamentary constituency	State constituency						
Parliamentary constituency	1954–59*	1959–1974	1974–1986	1986–1995	1995–2004	2004–2018	2018–present
Muar			Bandar Maharani				
Muar						Maharani	
Muar				Parit Bakar			
Muar			Parit Jawa				
Muar					Sungai Balang		

=== Historical boundaries ===
State Constituency	Area				
State Constituency	1974	1984	1994	2003	2018
Bandar Maharani	Bukit Bakri; Maharani; Muar; Simpang Jeram; Sungai Abong				
Maharani				Maharani; Muar; Parit Bakar; Parit Raja; Parit Umas	
Parit Bakar		Maharani; Muar; Parit Bakar; Parit Raja; Parit Umas			
Parit Jawa	Bukit Mor; Bukit Naning; Parit Bakar; Parit Jawa; Parit Nawi	Parit Jawa; Parit Kassim; Parit Shafie; Parit Yusof; Sungai Balang			
Sungai Balang			Parit Jawa; Parit Kassim; Parit Shafie; Parit Yusof; Sungai Balang		

=== Current state assembly members ===
No.	State Constituency	Member	Coalition (Party)
N15	Maharani	Ashari Md Sarip	BN (UMNO)
N16	Sungai Balang	Selamat Takim	BN (UMNO)

=== Local governments & postcodes ===
No.	State Constituency	Local Government	Postcode
N15	Maharani	Muar Municipal Council	83600 Semerah; 84000 Muar; 84150 Parit Jawa
N16	Sungai Balang	Muar Municipal Council	83600 Semerah; 84000 Muar; 84150 Parit Jawa

== Election results ==
Malaysian general election, 2022
Party	Candidate	Votes	%	∆%
MUDA	Syed Saddiq Syed Abdul Rahman	19,961	37.55	▲37.55
PN	Abdullah Husin	18,616	35.02	▲35.02
BN	Mohd Helmy Abd Latiff	14,581	27.43	▼9.14
Total valid votes		53,158	100.00	
Total rejected ballots		374		
Unreturned ballots		163		
Turnout		53,695	77.12	▼6.90
Registered electors		68,925		
Majority		1,345	2.53	▼13.99
MUDA gain from PKR		Swing		?
Source(s) https://lom.agc.gov.my/ilims/upload/portal/akta/outputp/1753254/PUB%20617%20PARLIMEN%20JOHOR.pdf

Malaysian general election, 2018
Party	Candidate	Votes	%	∆%
PKR	Syed Saddiq Syed Abdul Rahman	22,341	53.09	▲53.09
BN	Razali Ibrahim	15,388	36.57	▼15.48
PAS	Abdul Aziz Talib	4,354	10.34	▲10.34
Total valid votes		42,083	100.00	
Total rejected ballots		636		
Unreturned ballots		-		
Turnout		42,719	84.02	▼1.01
Registered electors		50,843		
Majority		6,953	16.52	▲12.42
PKR gain from BN		Swing		?
Source(s) "His Majesty's Government Gazette - Notice of Contested Election, Parliament for the State of Johore [P.U. (B) 244/2018]" (PDF). Attorney General's Chambers of Malaysia. 3 May 2018. Archived from the original (PDF) on 29 December 2019. "Federal Government Gazette - Results of Contested Election and Statements of the Poll after the Official Addition of Votes, Parliamentary Constituencies for the State of Johore [P.U. (B) 318/2018]" (PDF). Attorney General's Chambers of Malaysia. 28 May 2018.

Malaysian general election, 2013
Party	Candidate	Votes	%	∆%
BN	Razali Ibrahim	20,867	52.05	▼5.90
PKR	Nor Hizwan Ahmad	19,221	47.95	▲5.90
Total valid votes		40,088	100.00	
Total rejected ballots		804		
Unreturned ballots		100		
Turnout		40,992	85.03	▲11.22
Registered electors		48,208		
Majority		1,646	4.10	▼11.80
BN hold		Swing		
Source(s) "Federal Government Gazette - Notice of Contested Election, Parliament for the State of Johore [P.U. (B) 181/2013]" (PDF). Attorney General's Chambers of Malaysia. 26 April 2013. "Federal Government Gazette - Results of Contested Election and Statements of the Poll after the Official Addition of Votes, Parliamentary Constituencies for the State of Johore [P.U. (B) 222/2013]" (PDF). Attorney General's Chambers of Malaysia. 22 May 2013.

Malaysian general election, 2008
Party	Candidate	Votes	%	∆%
BN	Razali Ibrahim	16,986	57.95	▼15.33
PKR	Nah Budin	12,325	42.05	▲42.05
Total valid votes		29,311	100.00	
Total rejected ballots		902		
Unreturned ballots		62		
Turnout		30,275	73.81	▲3.15
Registered electors		41,019		
Majority		4,661	15.90	▼30.66
BN hold		Swing		

Malaysian general election, 2004
Party	Candidate	Votes	%	∆%
BN	Razali Ibrahim	21,116	73.28	▲10.55
PAS	Mohamad Taib	7,701	26.72	▲26.72
Total valid votes		28,817	100.00	
Total rejected ballots		872		
Unreturned ballots		81		
Turnout		29,770	70.66	▲0.63
Registered electors		42,131		
Majority		13,415	46.56	▲21.10
BN hold		Swing		

Malaysian general election, 1999
Party	Candidate	Votes	%	∆%
BN	Robia Kosai	17,693	62.73	▼4.84
PKR	Abdul Rahman Othman	10,511	37.27	▲37.27
Total valid votes		28,204	100.00	
Total rejected ballots		852		
Unreturned ballots		34		
Turnout		29,090	70.03	▲0.27
Registered electors		41,539		
Majority		7,182	25.46	▼9.68
BN hold		Swing		

Malaysian general election, 1995
Party	Candidate	Votes	%	∆%
BN	Abdul Aziz Mohd. Yassin	18,238	67.57	▲12.18
S46	Zawawi Mohd. Zin	8,755	32.43	▼12.18
Total valid votes		26,993	100.00	
Total rejected ballots		1,451		
Unreturned ballots		151		
Turnout		28,595	69.76	▼1.82
Registered electors		40,990		
Majority		9,483	35.14	▲24.36
BN hold		Swing		

Malaysian general election, 1990
Party	Candidate	Votes	%	∆%
BN	Abdul Malek Munip	13,760	55.39	▼22.19
S46	Yahya Abd. Rahman	11,083	44.61	▲44.61
Total valid votes		24,843	100.00	
Total rejected ballots		976		
Unreturned ballots		0		
Turnout		25,819	71.58	▲3.92
Registered electors		36,070		
Majority		2,677	10.78	▼44.38
BN hold		Swing		

Malaysian general election, 1986
Party	Candidate	Votes	%	∆%
BN	Mohamed Sam Sailan	17,801	77.58	▲11.00
PAS	Md Said @ Md Sa'aid Abd Samad	5,143	22.42	▲17.95
Total valid votes		22,944	100.00	
Total rejected ballots		990		
Unreturned ballots		0		
Turnout		23,934	67.66	▼8.04
Registered electors		35,374		
Majority		12,658	55.16	▲17.53
BN hold		Swing		

Malaysian general election, 1982
Party	Candidate	Votes	%	∆%
BN	Neo Yee Pan	27,572	66.58	▲3.18
DAP	Tan Yang Ngai	11,991	28.95	▼1.17
PAS	Mohamad Anang	1,851	4.47	▼2.01
Total valid votes		41,414	100.00	
Total rejected ballots		2,488		
Unreturned ballots		0		
Turnout		43,902	75.70	▼2.13
Registered electors		57,997		
Majority		15,581	37.63	▲4.35
BN hold		Swing		

Malaysian general election, 1978
Party	Candidate	Votes	%	∆%
BN	Neo Yee Pan	23,538	63.40	▼17.12
DAP	Ho Chan Mee	11,183	30.12	▲10.64
PAS	Ahmad Abdul Rahman	2,405	6.48	▲6.48
Total valid votes		37,126	100.00	
Total rejected ballots		974		
Unreturned ballots		0		
Turnout		24,324	77.83	▲5.96
Registered electors		49,897		
Majority		12,355	33.28	▼27.76
BN hold		Swing		

Malaysian general election, 1974
Party	Candidate	Votes	%
BN	Neo Yee Pan	23,039	80.52
DAP	Khoo Sim Geok @ Khoo Chin Tow	5,573	19.48
Total valid votes		28,612	100.00
Total rejected ballots		1,229	
Unreturned ballots		0	
Turnout		29,841	71.87
Registered electors		40,350	
Majority		17,466	61.04
This was a new constituency created.
