= Pagoh (federal constituency) =

Federal constituency in Johor, Malaysia

Pagoh (P143)
Johor constituency

Federal constituency
- Legislature: Dewan Rakyat
- MP: Muhyiddin Yassin; PN
- Constituency created: 1974
- First contested: 1974
- Last contested: 2022

Demographics
- Population (2020): 95,202
- Electors (2026): 71,825
- Area (km²): 1,258
- Pop. density (per km²): 75.7

Pagoh is a federal constituency in Muar District, Segamat District and Tangkak District, Johor, Malaysia, that has been represented in the Dewan Rakyat since 1974.

The federal constituency was created from parts of the Muar Dalam constituency in the 1974 redistribution and is mandated to return a single member to the Dewan Rakyat under the first-past-the-post voting system.

== Demographics ==
Ethnic breakdown of Pagoh's electorate as of 2022
1. Malay (67.0%)
2. Chinese (29.3%)
3. Indian (3.40%)
4. Other ethnicities (0.30%)

As of 2020, Pagoh has a population of 95,202 people.

Age breakdown of Pagoh's electorate as of 2022
1. 18-20 (5.75%)
2. 21-29 (20.8%)
3. 30-39 (22.1%)
4. 40-49 (16.5%)
5. 50-59 (14.5%)
6. 60-69 (11.8%)
7. 70-79 (5.30%)
8. 80-89 (2.68%)
9. above 90 (0.51%)
Gender breakdown of Pagoh's electorate as of 2022
1. Male (49.8%)
2. Female (50.2%)

== History ==
=== Polling districts ===
According to the federal gazette issued on 2 July 2026, the Pagoh constituency has a total of 47 polling districts.

State constituency	Polling Districts	Code	Location
Bukit Kepong（N07）	Bandar Bukit Kepong	143/07/01	SJK (C) Kepong
Bukit Kepong（N07）	FELCRA Paya Kepar	143/07/02	SK FELCRA Bukit Kepong
Bukit Kepong（N07）	Ma'Okil	143/07/03	SK LKTP Ma'Okil 1
Bukit Kepong（N07）	Bukit Kepong	143/07/04	SK Bukit Kepong
Bukit Kepong（N07）	Lenga Utara	143/07/05	SK Lenga
Bukit Kepong（N07）	Lenga Selatan	143/07/06	SJK (C) Lenga
Bukit Kepong（N07）	Kampong Bahru	143/07/07	SA Kampung Baru Batu 28
Bukit Kepong（N07）	Lenga	143/07/08	SK LKTP Batu 27
Bukit Kepong（N07）	Kampong Gombang	143/07/09	SK Gombang
Bukit Kepong（N07）	Liang Batu	143/07/10	SK Liang Batu
Bukit Kepong（N07）	Lenga Road	143/07/11	SJK (C) Renchong
Bukit Kepong（N07）	Pagoh	143/07/12	SMK Sultan Alauddin Riayat Shah 1
Bukit Kepong（N07）	Bandar Pagoh Utara	143/07/13	SJK (C) Soon Mong
Bukit Kepong（N07）	Bandar Pagoh Selatan	143/07/14	SA Pekan Pagoh
Bukit Kepong（N07）	Paya Redan	143/07/15	SK Paya Redan
Bukit Kepong（N07）	Kampong Teratai	143/07/16	SJK (C) Lian Hwa
Bukit Kepong（N07）	Sri Ledang	143/07/17	SK RKT Sri Ledang
Bukit Kepong（N07）	FELDA Sri Jaya	143/07/18	SMK Tun Sri Lanang
Bukit Kepong（N07）	Durian Chondong	143/07/19	SK Durian Chondong
Bukit Kepong（N07）	Kundang Ulu	143/07/20	SMK Tengku Temenggong Ahmad
Bukit Kepong（N07）	Ladang Serampang	143/07/21	SJK (C) Lian Hwa
Bukit Kepong（N07）	Parit Raja	143/07/22	SK Bukit Rahmat
Bukit Kepong（N07）	Bandar Grisek Timor	143/07/23	SK Gersek
Bukit Kepong（N07）	Kampong Kundang Ulu	143/07/24	SK Kundang Ulu
Bukit Kepong（N07）	Ladang Nordanal	143/07/25	SJK (T) Ladang Nordanal
Bukit Kepong（N07）	Kebun Bahru	153/07/26	SJK (C) Kebun Bahru
Bukit Kepong（N07）	Grisek	143/07/27	SJK (C) Pei Eng
Bukit Pasir (N08）	Samasih	143/08/01	SK Semaseh
Bukit Pasir (N08）	Kampong Raja	143/08/02	SK Kampong Raja
Bukit Pasir (N08）	Panchor	143/08/03	SK Kota Raja
Bukit Pasir (N08）	Bandar Panchor	143/08/04	SJK (C) Ai Hwa
Bukit Pasir (N08）	Kampong Jawa	143/08/05	SK Panchor
Bukit Pasir (N08）	Jorak	143/08/06	SK Jorak
Bukit Pasir (N08）	Tanjong Selabu	143/08/07	SJK (C) Wee Sin
Bukit Pasir (N08）	Pergam	143/08/08	Balai Raya Kampung Pergam
Bukit Pasir (N08）	Temiang	143/08/09	SK Temiang
Bukit Pasir (N08）	Sungai Terap	143/08/10	Ma'had Tahfiz Al-Quran Al-Muttaqin
Bukit Pasir (N08）	Sungai Raya	143/08/11	SK Sungai Raya
Bukit Pasir (N08）	Kampong Tengah	143/08/12	Balai Raya Kampung Tengah
Bukit Pasir (N08）	Permatang Pasir	143/08/13	SK Sri Bukit Pasir
Bukit Pasir (N08）	Pekan Bukit Pasir Barat	143/08/14	SJK (C) Yu Jern
Bukit Pasir (N08）	Pekan Bukit Pasir Utara	143/08/15	SMK Bukit Pasir
Bukit Pasir (N08）	Pekan Bukit Pasir Selatan	143/08/16	SJK (T) Ladang Temiang Renchong
Bukit Pasir (N08）	Bukit Pasir	143/08/17	SK Paya Panjang
Bukit Pasir (N08）	Ladang Craigielea	143/08/18	SJK (C) Kim Kee
Bukit Pasir (N08）	Panjang Sari	143/08/19	SK Panjang Sari
Bukit Pasir (N08）	Bukit Treh	143/08/20	SJK (C) Aik Ming

=== Representation history ===
Members of Parliament for Pagoh
Parliament	No	Years	Member	Party	Vote Share
Constituency created from Muar Dalam, Muar Utara and Muar Pantai
4th	P104	1974–1978	Syed Nasir Ismail (سيد ناصر إسماعيل)	BN (UMNO)	Uncontested
5th	P104	1978–1982	Muhyiddin Yassin (محيي الدين ياسين)	BN (UMNO)	17,679; 89.52%
6th	P104	1982–1986	Muhyiddin Yassin (محيي الدين ياسين)	BN (UMNO)	19,035; 87.77%
7th	P117	1986–1990	Ahmad Omar (احمد عمر)	BN (UMNO)	19,365; 85.08%
8th	P117	1990–1995	Ahmad Omar (احمد عمر)	BN (UMNO)	18,461; 73.06%
9th	P127	1995–1999	Muhyiddin Yassin (محيي الدين ياسين)	BN (UMNO)	21,856; 83.70%
10th	P127	1999–2004	Muhyiddin Yassin (محيي الدين ياسين)	BN (UMNO)	20,140; 73.44%
11th	P143	2004–2008	Muhyiddin Yassin (محيي الدين ياسين)	BN (UMNO)	23,679; 82.76%
12th	P143	2008–2013	Muhyiddin Yassin (محيي الدين ياسين)	BN (UMNO)	21,028; 71.34%
13th	P143	2013–2016	Muhyiddin Yassin (محيي الدين ياسين)	BN (UMNO)	26,274; 66.17%
13th	P143	2016–2018	Muhyiddin Yassin (محيي الدين ياسين)	BERSATU	26,274; 66.17%
14th	P143	2018–2020	Muhyiddin Yassin (محيي الدين ياسين)	PH (BERSATU)	23,558; 55.21%
14th	P143	2020–2022	Muhyiddin Yassin (محيي الدين ياسين)	PN (BERSATU)	23,558; 55.21%
15th	P143	2022–present	Muhyiddin Yassin (محيي الدين ياسين)	PN (BERSATU)	24,986; 45.94%

=== State constituency ===
Parliamentary constituency	State constituency						
Parliamentary constituency	1954–59*	1959–1974	1974–1986	1986–1995	1995–2004	2004–2018	2018–present
Pagoh							Bukit Kepong
Pagoh							Bukit Pasir
Pagoh				Bukit Serampang			
Pagoh			Jorak				
Pagoh			Kesang				

=== Historical boundaries ===
State Constituency	Area				
State Constituency	1974	1984	1994	2003	2018
Bukit Kepong					Grisek; FELDA Maokil; FELDA Sri Ledang; Lenga; Pagoh
Bukit Pasir					Bukit Pasir; Jorak; Kampung Pergam; Pancor; Tanjung Selabu
Bukit Serampang		Bukit Serampang; Grisek; FELDA Maokil; FELDA Sri Ledang; Lenga	Bukit Kepong; Bukit Serampang; Grisek; FELDA Sri Ledang; Lenga	Bukit Serampang; Grisek; FELDA Maokil; FELDA Sri Ledang; Lenga	
Jorak	Bukit Pasir; Pagoh; Pancor; Sengkang; Tanjung Selabu	Bukit Pasir; Jorak; Pagoh; Pancor; Tanjung Selabu			
Kesang	Bukit Pasir; Jorak; Kesang; Sabak Awor; Tanjung Agas				

=== Current state assembly members ===
No.	State Constituency	Member	Coalition (Party)
N07	Bukit Kepong	Ahmad Syar'e Yusof	BN (UMNO)
N08	Bukit Pasir	Mohamad Fazli Salleh	BN (UMNO)

=== Local governments & postcodes ===
No.	State Constituency	Local Government	Postcode
N07	Bukit Kepong	Muar Municipal Council; Labis District Council (FELDA Maokil area); Tangkak District Council (Bukit Serampang and FELDA Sri Jaya areas)	84000 Muar; 84200 Bakri; 84300 Bukit Pasir; 84400 Sungai Mati; 84500 Panchor; 84600 Pagoh; 84700 Gerisik; 84800 Bukit Gambir; 85300 Labis
N08	Bukit Pasir	Muar Municipal Council	84000 Muar; 84200 Bakri; 84300 Bukit Pasir; 84400 Sungai Mati; 84500 Panchor; 84600 Pagoh; 84700 Gerisik; 84800 Bukit Gambir; 85300 Labis

== Election results ==
Malaysian general election, 2022
Party	Candidate	Votes	%	∆%
PN	Muhyiddin Yassin	24,986	45.94	▲45.94
PH	Iskandar Shah Abd Rahman	14,979	27.54	▲27.54
BN	Razali Ibrahim	14,426	26.52	▼12.45
Total valid votes		54,391	100.00	
Total rejected ballots		419		
Unreturned ballots		123		
Turnout		54,933	77.77	▼7.00
Registered electors		69,939		
Majority		10,007	18.40	▲2.16
PN gain from BERSATU		Swing		?
Source(s) https://lom.agc.gov.my/ilims/upload/portal/akta/outputp/1753254/PUB%20617%20PARLIMEN%20JOHOR.pdf

Malaysian general election, 2018
Party	Candidate	Votes	%	∆%
BERSATU	Muhyiddin Yassin	23,558	55.21	▲55.21
BN	Ismail Mohamed	16,631	38.97	▼27.20
PAS	Ahmad Nawfal Mahfodz	2,483	5.82	▼28.01
Total valid votes		42,672	100.00	
Total rejected ballots		693		
Unreturned ballots		302		
Turnout		43,667	84.77	▼2.02
Registered electors		51,512		
Majority		6,927	16.24	▼16.10
BERSATU gain from BN		Swing		?
Source(s) "His Majesty's Government Gazette - Notice of Contested Election, Parliament for the State of Johore [P.U. (B) 244/2018]" (PDF). Attorney General's Chambers of Malaysia. 3 May 2018. Archived from the original (PDF) on December 29, 2019. "Federal Government Gazette - Results of Contested Election and Statements of the Poll after the Official Addition of Votes, Parliamentary Constituencies for the State of Johore [P.U. (B) 318/2018]" (PDF). Attorney General's Chambers of Malaysia. 28 May 2018.

Malaysian general election, 2013
Party	Candidate	Votes	%	∆%
BN	Muhyiddin Yassin	26,274	66.17	▼5.17
PAS	Mohamad Rozali Jamil	13,432	33.83	▲5.17
Total valid votes		39,706	100.00	
Total rejected ballots		816		
Unreturned ballots		91		
Turnout		40,613	86.79	▲11.09
Registered electors		46,793		
Majority		12,842	32.34	▼10.34
BN hold		Swing		
Source(s) "Federal Government Gazette - Notice of Contested Election, Parliament for the State of Johore [P.U. (B) 181/2013]" (PDF). Attorney General's Chambers of Malaysia. 26 April 2013. "Federal Government Gazette - Results of Contested Election and Statements of the Poll after the Official Addition of Votes, Parliamentary Constituencies for the State of Johore [P.U. (B) 222/2013]" (PDF). Attorney General's Chambers of Malaysia. 22 May 2013.

Malaysian general election, 2008
Party	Candidate	Votes	%	∆%
BN	Muhyiddin Yassin	21,028	71.34	▼11.42
PAS	Mohamad Rozali Jamil	8,447	28.66	▲11.42
Total valid votes		29,475	100.00	
Total rejected ballots		787		
Unreturned ballots		51		
Turnout		30,313	75.70	▲2.18
Registered electors		40,042		
Majority		12,581	42.68	▼22.84
BN hold		Swing		

Malaysian general election, 2004
Party	Candidate	Votes	%	∆%
BN	Muhyiddin Yassin	23,679	82.76	▲9.32
PAS	Mohamed Awang	4,932	17.24	▲17.24
Total valid votes		28,611	100.00	
Total rejected ballots		881		
Unreturned ballots		42		
Turnout		29,534	73.52	▲2.33
Registered electors		40,172		
Majority		18,747	65.52	▲18.64
BN hold		Swing		

Malaysian general election, 1999
Party	Candidate	Votes	%	∆%
BN	Muhyiddin Yassin	20,140	73.44	▼10.26
PKR	Alias Shamsir	7,283	26.56	▲26.56
Total valid votes		27,423	100.00	
Total rejected ballots		872		
Unreturned ballots		35		
Turnout		28,330	71.19	▲0.49
Registered electors		39,791		
Majority		12,857	46.88	▼20.52
BN hold		Swing		

Malaysian general election, 1995
Party	Candidate	Votes	%	∆%
BN	Muhyiddin Yassin	21,856	83.70	▲10.64
S46	Rosdan Taha Abd. Rahman	4,257	16.30	▼10.64
Total valid votes		26,113	100.00	
Total rejected ballots		1,379		
Unreturned ballots		5		
Turnout		27,497	70.70	▼3.66
Registered electors		38,895		
Majority		17,599	67.40	▲21.28
BN hold		Swing		

Malaysian general election, 1990
Party	Candidate	Votes	%	∆%
BN	Ahmad Omar	18,461	73.06	▼12.02
S46	Murad Hasan	6,808	26.94	▲26.94
Total valid votes		25,269	100.00	
Total rejected ballots		784		
Unreturned ballots		0		
Turnout		26,053	74.36	▲3.43
Registered electors		35,036		
Majority		11,653	46.12	▼24.04
BN hold		Swing		

Malaysian general election, 1986
Party	Candidate	Votes	%	∆%
BN	Ahmad Omar	19,365	85.08	▼2.69
PAS	Othman Hashim	3,395	14.92	▲2.69
Total valid votes		22,760	100.00	
Total rejected ballots		666		
Unreturned ballots		0		
Turnout		23,426	70.93	▼3.93
Registered electors		33,028		
Majority		15,970	70.16	▼5.38
BN hold		Swing		

Malaysian general election, 1982
Party	Candidate	Votes	%	∆%
BN	Muhyiddin Yassin	19,035	87.77	▼1.75
PAS	Samudi Ahmad	2,652	12.23	▲1.75
Total valid votes		21,687	100.00	
Total rejected ballots		1,234		
Unreturned ballots		0		
Turnout		22,921	74.86	▼2.39
Registered electors		30,617		
Majority		16,383	75.54	▼3.50
BN hold		Swing		

Malaysian general election, 1978
Party	Candidate	Votes	%	∆%
BN	Muhyiddin Yassin	17,679	89.52	▲89.52
PAS	Abdul Wahab Abdul Rahman	2,069	10.48	▲10.48
Total valid votes		19,748	100.00	
Total rejected ballots		570		
Unreturned ballots		0		
Turnout		20,318	77.25	
Registered electors		26,302		
Majority		15,610	79.04	
BN hold		Swing		

Malaysian general election, 1974
Party	Candidate	Votes	%
On the nomination day, Syed Nasir Ismail won uncontested.
BN	Syed Nasir Ismail		
Total valid votes			100.00
Total rejected ballots			
Unreturned ballots			
Turnout			
Registered electors		24,346	
Majority			
This was a new constituency created out of Muar Dalam which went to Alliance in the previous election.
