= Nor Hayati Bachok =

Malaysian politician

- نور حياتي باچوق

Deputy Women Chief of the National Trust Party
- In office 1 December 2019 – 22 December 2023
- President: Mohamad Sabu
- Women Chief: Aiman Athirah Sabu
- Succeeded by: Anfaal Saari

Member of the Johor State Legislative Assembly for Maharani
- In office 9 May 2018 – 12 March 2022
- Preceded by: Mohammad Taslim (PR–PAS)
- Succeeded by: Abdul Aziz Talib (PN–PAS)
- Majority: 5,674 (2018)

Personal details
- Born: 3 February 1962 (age 64) Parit Jawa, Muar, Johor, Federation of Malaya (now Malaysia)
- Party: Malaysian Islamic Party (PAS) (–2015); National Trust Party (AMANAH) (since 2015)
- Other political affiliations: Pakatan Rakyat (PR) (–2015); Pakatan Harapan (PH) (since 2015)

Nor Hayati binti Bachok is a Malaysian politician who served as Member of the Johor State Legislative Assembly (MLA) for Maharani from May 2018 to March 2022. She is a member of the National Trust Party (AMANAH), a component party of the Pakatan Harapan (PH) coalition and was a member of the Malaysian Islamic Party (PAS), a component party of formerly the Pakatan Rakyat (PR) coalition. She also served as the Deputy Women Chief of AMANAH from December 2019 to December 2023.

== Election results ==
Johor State Legislative Assembly
Year	Constituency	Candidate	Votes	Pct	Opponent(s)	Votes	Pct	Ballots cast	Majority	Turnout
2013	N08 Jorak	Nor Hayati Bachok (PAS)	8,937	41.37%	Shahruddin Md Salleh (UMNO)	12,663	58.63%	22,049	3,726	86.93%
2018	N15 Maharani	Nor Hayati Bachok (AMANAH)	12,405	53.92%	Ashari Md Sarip (UMNO)	6,731	29.26%	23,397	5,674	83.86%
2018	N15 Maharani	Nor Hayati Bachok (AMANAH)	12,405	53.92%	Mohammad Taslim (PAS)	3,869	16.82%	23,397	5,674	83.86%
2022	N15 Maharani	Nor Hayati Bachok (AMANAH)	6,522	31.03%	Abdul Aziz Talib (PAS)	7,559	35.97%	21,523	1,037	55.76%
2022	N15 Maharani	Nor Hayati Bachok (AMANAH)	6,522	31.03%	Noor Farah Shamsudin (UMNO)	5,861	27.89%	21,523	1,037	55.76%
2022	N15 Maharani	Nor Hayati Bachok (AMANAH)	6,522	31.03%	Lim Kim Joo (IND)	592	2.82%	21,523	1,037	55.76%
2022	N15 Maharani	Nor Hayati Bachok (AMANAH)	6,522	31.03%	Riad Ahmad (PEJUANG)	292	1.39%	21,523	1,037	55.76%
2022	N15 Maharani	Nor Hayati Bachok (AMANAH)	6,522	31.03%	Hanis Asmui (PBM)	190	0.90%	21,523	1,037	55.76%
