= Muar Dalam =

Johor constituency

Defunct federal constituency
- Legislature: Dewan Rakyat
- Constituency created: 1958
- Constituency abolished: 1974
- First contested: 1959
- Last contested: 1969

Muar Dalam was a federal constituency in Johor, Malaysia, that was represented in the Dewan Rakyat from 1959 to 1974.

== History ==
Muar Dalam was abolished in 1974 when it was redistributed. The new Pagoh federal constituency was then created from parts of the Muar Dalam constituency in the 1974 redistribution and was mandated to return a single member to the Dewan Rakyat under the first-past-the-post voting system.

=== Representation history ===
Members of Parliament for Muar Dalam
Parliament	No	Years	Member	Party	Vote Share
Constituency split from Muar Utara
Parliament of the Federation of Malaya
1st	P089	1959-1963	Aziz Ishak (عزيز اسحاق)	Alliance (UMNO)	11,329; 74.16%
Parliament of Malaysia
1st	P089	1963-1964	Aziz Ishak (عزيز اسحاق)	Alliance (UMNO)	11,329; 74.16%
2nd	P089	1964-1969	Aziz Ishak (عزيز اسحاق)	Alliance (UMNO)	15,385; 84.44%
		1969-1971	Parliament was suspended		
3rd	P089	1971-1973	Syed Nasir Ismail (سيد ناصر اسماعيل)	Alliance (UMNO)	Uncontested
3rd	P089	1973-1974	Syed Nasir Ismail (سيد ناصر اسماعيل)	BN (UMNO)	Uncontested
Constituency abolished split into Segamat, Ledang, Muar and Pagoh

=== State constituency ===
Parliamentary constituency	State constituency						
Parliamentary constituency	1954–59*	1959–1974	1974–1986	1986–1995	1995–2004	2004–2018	2018–present
Muar Dalam		Bukit Serampang					
Muar Dalam		Jorak					

=== Historical boundaries ===
State Constituency	Area
State Constituency	1959
Bukit Serampang	Bukit Kepong; Bukit Serampang; Gerisek; Lenga; Pagoh
Jorak	Bukit Bakri; Bukit Pasir; Jorak; Panchor; Simpang Jeram

== Election results ==
Malaysian general election, 1969: Muar Dalam
Party	Candidate	Votes	%	∆%
On the nomination day, Syed Nasir Ismail won uncontested.
Alliance	Syed Nasir Ismail			
Total valid votes			100.00	
Total rejected ballots				
Unreturned ballots				
Turnout				
Registered electors		28,523		
Majority				
Alliance hold		Swing		

Malaysian general election, 1964: Muar Dalam
Party	Candidate	Votes	%	∆%
Alliance	Aziz Ishak	15,385	84.44	▲10.28
Socialist Front	Mohammed Dali Othman	2,834	15.56	▲15.56
Total valid votes		18,219	100.00	
Total rejected ballots		540		
Unreturned ballots		0		
Turnout		18,759	82.56	▲5.19
Registered electors		22,723		
Majority		12,551	68.88	▲20.56
Alliance hold		Swing		

Malayan general election, 1959: Muar Dalam
Party	Candidate	Votes	%
Alliance	Aziz Ishak	11,329	74.16
National Party	Ahmad Abu	3,947	25.84
Total valid votes		15,276	100.00
Total rejected ballots		237	
Unreturned ballots		0	
Turnout		15,513	77.37
Registered electors		20,050	
Majority		7,382	48.32
This was a new constituency created.
