= Razali Ibrahim =

Malaysian politician

Yang Berbahagia Datuk Seri Razali Ibrahim SMW DCSM DIMP
- رزالي ابراهيم

Vice Youth Chief of the United Malays National Organization
- In office 26 March 2008 – 23 October 2013
- Preceded by: Khairy Jamaluddin
- Succeeded by: Khairul Azwan Harun

Ministerial roles
- 2008–2013: Deputy Minister of Youth and Sports
- 2013–2018: Deputy Minister in the Prime Minister's Department

Faction represented in Dewan Rakyat
- 2004–2018: Barisan Nasional

Personal details
- Born: 14 October 1970 (age 56) Muar, Johor, Malaysia
- Party: United Malays National Organisation (UMNO)
- Other political affiliations: Barisan Nasional (BN)
- Education: National University of Malaysia
- Occupation: Politician; Lawyer
- Website: www.razali-ibrahim.my
- Razali Ibrahim on Facebook

Razali bin Ibrahim (born 14 October 1970) is a Malaysian politician who served as the Member of Parliament (MP) for the Muar for three consecutive terms from March 2004 until his defeat to Syed Saddiq during the general elections of May 2018. He is a member of the Supreme Council of the United Malays National Organisation (UMNO), a component party of the Barisan Nasional (BN) coalition. Previously, he was the Deputy Minister in the Prime Minister's Department in the BN administration under former Prime Minister Najib Razak in his second cabinet from May 2013 to May 2018 for 5 years and prior to that, he was also Deputy Minister of Youth and Sports under former Prime Ministers Abdullah Ahmad Badawi for his second cabinet as well as Najib Razak in his first cabinet from 2008 to 2013, before being transferred to another deputy ministerial portfolio.

== Politics ==
Razali was elected to the Parliament in the 2004 general election. He was reelected again in the 2008 general election and in the 2013 general election. His margin of victory was reduced significantly by a drop in ethnic Chinese support for BN from the Muar electorate which was approximately 35% Chinese. He remained a deputy minister after the election, although was shifted to the Prime Minister's Department. Later in 2013 he vacated his post as the deputy chief of UMNO's youth wing due to his age, and won election to the 25-member Supreme Council of the full party. In the 2018 general election he lost and failed to retain his parliamentary seat. Razali's defeat was despite the former Deputy Prime Minister Ahmad Zahid Hamidi purposely campaign trail to Muar a day before polling day during which Zahid had quipped in full confident that he "might as well go jump into the well if he loses" in dismissing reports of BN possibly losing the seat.

== Election results ==
Parliament of Malaysia
Year	Constituency	Candidate	Votes	Pct	Opponent(s)	Votes	Pct	Ballots cast	Majority	Turnout
2004	P146 Muar	Razali Ibrahim (UMNO)	21,116	73.28%	Mohamad Taib (PAS)	7,701	26.72%	29,770	13,415	70.66%
2008	P146 Muar	Razali Ibrahim (UMNO)	16,986	57.95%	Nah Budin (PKR)	12,325	42.05%	30,275	4,661	73.81%
2013	P146 Muar	Razali Ibrahim (UMNO)	20,867	52.05%	Nor Hizwan Ahmad (PKR)	19,221	47.95%	40,992	1,646	85.03%
2018	P146 Muar	Razali Ibrahim (UMNO)	15,388	36.57%	Syed Saddiq (BERSATU)	22,341	53.09%	42,083	6,953	84.02%
2018	P146 Muar	Razali Ibrahim (UMNO)	15,388	36.57%	Abd Aziz Talib (PAS)	4,354	10.34%	42,083	6,953	84.02%
2022	P143 Pagoh	Razali Ibrahim (UMNO)	14,426	26.52%	Muhyiddin Yassin (BERSATU)	24,986	45.94%	54,391	10,007	77.77%
2022	P143 Pagoh	Razali Ibrahim (UMNO)	14,426	26.52%	Iskandar Shah Abdul Rahman (PKR)	14,979	27.54%	54,391	10,007	77.77%

== Honours ==
=== Honours of Malaysia ===
- Pahang
  - Knight Companion of the Order of the Crown of Pahang (DIMP) – Dato' (2008)
- Malacca
  - Knight Commander of the Exalted Order of Malacca (DCSM) – Datuk Wira (2017)
- Federal Territory (Malaysia)
  - Grand Commander of the Order of the Territorial Crown (SMW) – Datuk Seri (2018)

== See also ==
- Muar (federal constituency)
