= Abdul Aziz Talib =

Malaysian politician

- عبدالعزيز طالب

Member of the Johor State Legislative Assembly for Maharani
- In office 12 March 2022 – 11 July 2026
- Preceded by: Nor Hayati Bachok
- Succeeded by: Ashari Md Sarip

Personal details
- Born: Abdul Aziz bin Talib
- Citizenship: Malaysian
- Party: PAS
- Other political affiliations: Perikatan Nasional
- Occupation: Politician

Abdul Aziz bin Talib is a Malaysian politician from PAS. He has served as the Member of Johor State Legislative Assembly for Maharani since 2022. He is also the Chairman of PAS Muar division.

== Election results ==
Parliament of Malaysia
Year	Constituency	Candidate	Votes	Pct.	Opponent(s)	Votes	Pct.	Ballots cast	Majority	Turnout
2018	P146 Muar	Abdul Aziz Talib (PAS)	4,354	10.34%	Syed Saddiq Syed Abdul Rahman (BERSATU)	22,341	53.09%	42,719	6,953	84.02%
2018	P146 Muar	Abdul Aziz Talib (PAS)	4,354	10.34%	Razali Ibrahim (UMNO)	15,388	36.57%	42,719	6,953	84.02%

Johor State Legislative Assembly
Year	Constituency	Candidate	Votes	Pct.	Opponent(s)	Votes	Pct.	Ballots cast	Majority	Turnout
2022	N15 Maharani	Abdul Aziz Talib (PAS)	7,559	35.97%	Nor Hayati Bachok (AMANAH)	6,522	31.03%	21,523	1,037	55.76%
2022	N15 Maharani	Abdul Aziz Talib (PAS)	7,559	35.97%	Noor Farah Shamsudin (UMNO)	5,861	27.89%	21,523	1,037	55.76%
2022	N15 Maharani	Abdul Aziz Talib (PAS)	7,559	35.97%	Lim Kim Joo (IND)	592	2.82%	21,523	1,037	55.76%
2022	N15 Maharani	Abdul Aziz Talib (PAS)	7,559	35.97%	Riad Ahmad (PEJUANG)	292	1.39%	21,523	1,037	55.76%
2022	N15 Maharani	Abdul Aziz Talib (PAS)	7,559	35.97%	Hanis Asmui (PBM)	190	0.90%	21,523	1,037	55.76%
