= Abdul Aziz Yassin =

Malaysian politician

Yang Berbahagia Tan Sri Abdul Aziz Mohd Yassin PSM KMN PJK

Advisor, Malaysian Cooperative Commission
- In office 15 November 2020 – 15 November 2021

Member of the Malaysian United Indigenous Party Supreme Leadership Council
- In office 14 Januari 2017 – 23 Ogos 2020
- President: Muhyiddin Yassin
- Preceded by: post created

Chairman of Economic Bureau, Malaysian United Indigenous Party
- In office 14 January 2017 – 23 August 2020
- Preceded by: post created
- Succeeded by: Mustapa Mohamed

Member of the Malaysian Parliament for Muar, Johor
- In office 7 June 1995 – 10 November 1999
- Preceded by: Abdul Malek Munip (BN-UMNO)
- Succeeded by: Robia Kosai (BN-UMNO)
- Majority: 18,238 (1995)

Deputy Chairman of the Federal Agricultural Marketing Agency
- In office 29 September 1964 – 11 October 1969
- Chairman: Tan Sri Hanafiah Hussain
- Preceded by: post created
- Succeeded by: Abdul Rahman Haji Yusof

Personal details
- Born: Abdul Aziz bin Mohd Yasin; 27 October 1932 Kampung Haji Mohd Yassin, Batu 1 1/4 Jalan Bakri, Bandar Maharani, Johor,
- Died: 6 December 2022 (aged 90) Hospital Kuala Lumpur
- Party: UMNO (1955–2016); BERSATU (2016–2022)
- Other political affiliations: Alliance Party (1955–1973); BN (1974–2016); PH (2017–2020); PN (2020–2022)
- Spouse: 3
- Relations: Tan Sri Muhyiddin Yassin (younger brother); Puan Sri Noorainee Abdul Rahman (sister-in-law); Datuk Fakhri Yassin Mahiaddin (nephew); Najwa Mahiaddin (niece)
- Occupation: politician, businessman

Abdul Aziz bin Mohd Yassin (27 October 1932 – 6 December 2022) is a former Member of Parliament for Muar (1995–1999). He is the brother of the 8th Prime Minister of Malaysia, Tan Sri Muhyiddin Yassin. Before joining politics, he was a government official.

== Career ==
He is the former Deputy Chairman of Federal Agricultural Marketing Agency (FAMA) in 1965.

== Election results ==
Parliament Malaysia
Year	Constituency	Candidate	Votes	Pct	Opponent(s)	Votes	Pct	Ballot casts	Majority	Turnout
1995	P133 Muar, Johor	Abdul Aziz Yassin (UMNO)	18,238	67.57%	Zawawi Mohd. Zin (S46)	8,755	32.43%	28,595	9,483	69.76%

== Post political career ==
He was appointed as the first Yang di-Pertua of the Majlis Bekas Wakil Rakyat Malaysia (MUBARAK) in 2009, an organization for former Barisan Nasional representatives whose establishment was inspired by Tan Sri Muhyiddin Yassin.

He was later appointed as Yang di-Pertua MUBARAK for the Federal Territories from 2014 to 2019.

== Honours ==
- Malaysia
  - Officer of the Order of the Defender of the Realm (KMN) (1966)
  - Commander of the Order of Loyalty to the Crown of Malaysia (PSM) – Tan Sri (2013)
- Malacca
  - Meritorious Service Medal (PJK)

== Death ==
He died at 10.30 am at Kuala Lumpur Hospital.
