= Maharani (state constituency) =

State constituency in Johor, Malaysia

Maharani (N15)
Johor constituency

State constituency
- Legislature: Johor State Legislative Assembly
MLA
Ashari Md Sarip
BN
- Constituency created: 1984
- First contested: 1986
- Last contested: 2026

Demographics
- Population (2020): 59,851
- Electors (2026): 40,040
- Area (km²): 65

Maharani is a state constituency in Johor, Malaysia, that is represented in the Johor State Legislative Assembly.

The state constituency was first contested in 1959 and is mandated to return a single Assemblyman to the Johor State Legislative Assembly under the first-past-the-post voting system.

== Demographics ==
As of 2020, Maharani has a population of 59,851 people.

Ethnic breakdown of Maharani's electorate as of 2026
1. Malay (61.8%)
2. Chinese (34.9%)
3. Indian (2.10%)
4. Other ethnicities (1.10%)

== History ==
=== Polling districts ===
According to the federal gazette issued on 2 July 2026, the Maharani constituency has a total of 14 polling districts.

State constituency	Polling Districts	Code	Location
Maharani（N15）	Maharani	146/15/01	SMK Sri Muar
Maharani（N15）	Tanjong	146/15/02	SMK (P) Sultan Abu Bakar
Maharani（N15）	Tanjong Selatan	146/15/03	SMA Maahad Muar
Maharani（N15）	Jalan Khalidi	146/15/04	SJK (T) Jalan Khalidi
Maharani（N15）	Temenggong Ahmad Selatan	146/15/05	SK Ismail Satu
Maharani（N15）	Parit Perupok Timor	146/15/06	SK Parit Kadzi
Maharani（N15）	Parit Perupok Barat	146/15/07	SJK (C) Chung Hwa Ketiga
Maharani（N15）	Parit Keroma	146/15/08	SK Parit Keruma
Maharani（N15）	Parit Raja	146/15/09	SMK Tengku Mahkota
Maharani（N15）	Parit Bakar Darat	146/15/10	SJK (C) Chi Sin
Maharani（N15）	Parit Bakar	146/15/11	SK Parit Bakar Tengah
Maharani（N15）	Parit Unas	146/15/12	SJK (C) San Chai
Maharani（N15）	Parit Pinang Seribu	146/15/13	SK Parit Pinang Seribu
Maharani（N15）	Parit Samsu	146/15/14	SK Parit Samsu

=== Representation history ===
Members of the Legislative Assembly for Maharani
Assembly	No	Years	Member	Party
Constituency created from Bandar Maharani and Kesang
7th	N16	1986–1990	Song Sing Kwee (宋新辉)	DAP
8th	N16	1990–1995	John Lim Wan Show (林万寿)	DAP
9th	N16	1995–1999	Tay Khim Seng (郑锦成)	BN (MCA)
10th	N16	1999–2004	Lau Yew Wee @ Low Yu Wee (刘有为)	BN (MCA)
11th	N15	2004–2008	Mohd Ismail Mohd Shah	BN (UMNO)
12th	N15	2008–2013	Mohammad Taslim	PR (PAS)
13th	N15	2013–2018	Mohammad Taslim	PR (PAS)
14th	N15	2018–2022	Nor Hayati Bachok	PH (AMANAH)
15th	N15	2022–2026	Abdul Aziz Talib	PN (PAS)
16th	N15	2026-present	Asharani Md Sarip	BN (UMNO)

== Election results ==
Johor state election, 2026
Party	Candidate	Votes	%	∆%
BN	Ashari Md Sarip	10,570	38.93	▲11.04
PH	Muhammad Taqiuddin Cheman	8,427	31.04	▲0.01
PN	Mohamad Anuar Hayan	5,658	20.84	▼15.13
MUDA	Muhammad Amir Fiqri	2,495	9.19	▲9.19
Total valid votes		27,150	100.00	
Total rejected ballots		382		
Unreturned ballots		33		
Turnout		27,565	68.84	▲13.08
Registered electors		40,040		
Majority		2,143	7.89	▲2.96
BN gain from PN		Swing		?

Johor state election, 2022
Party	Candidate	Votes	%	∆%
PN	Abdul Aziz Talib	7,559	35.97	▲35.97
PH	Nor Hayati Bachok	6,522	31.03	▲31.03
BN	Noor Farah Shamsudin	5,861	27.89	▼1.37
Independent	Lim Kim Joo	592	2.82	▲2.82
PEJUANG	Riad Ahmad	292	1.39	▲1.39
PBM	Hanis Asmui	190	0.90	▲0.90
Total valid votes		21,016	100.00	
Total rejected ballots		356		
Unreturned ballots		151		
Turnout		21,523	55.76	
Registered electors		38,596		
Majority		1,037	4.94	
PN gain from PKR		Swing		?

Johor state election, 2018
Party	Candidate	Votes	%	∆%
PKR	Nor Hayati Bachok	12,405	53.92	▲53.92
BN	Ashari Md. Sarip	6,731	29.26	▼13.72
PAS	Mohammad Taslim	3,869	16.82	▼40.21
Total valid votes		23,005	100.00	
Total rejected ballots		299		
Unreturned ballots		93		
Turnout		23,397	83.86	▼0.09
Registered electors		27,900		
Majority		5,674	24.66	▲10.62
PKR gain from PAS		Swing		-

Johor state election, 2013
Party	Candidate	Votes	%	∆%
PAS	Mohammad Taslim	12,731	57.02	▲6.53
BN	Zulkhairi Ahmad	9,595	42.98	▼6.53
Total valid votes		22,326	100.00	
Total rejected ballots		369		
Unreturned ballots		48		
Turnout		22,743	83.95	▲11.68
Registered electors		27,090		
Majority		3,136	14.05	▲13.07
PAS hold		Swing		

Johor state election, 2008
Party	Candidate	Votes	%	∆%
PAS	Mohammad Taslim	8,154	50.49	▲21.41
BN	Mohd. Ismail Mohd. Shah	7,996	49.51	▼21.41
Total valid votes		16,150	100.00	
Total rejected ballots		354		
Unreturned ballots		47		
Turnout		16,551	72.27	▲3.08
Registered electors		22,902		
Majority		158	0.98	▼40.87
PAS gain from BN		Swing		-

Johor state election, 2004
Party	Candidate	Votes	%	∆%
BN	Mohd. Ismail Mohd. Shah	11,206	70.92	▲14.42
PAS	Mohammad Taslim	4,594	29.08	▲29.08
Total valid votes		15,800	100.00	
Total rejected ballots		373		
Unreturned ballots		64		
Turnout		16,237	69.19	▲1.13
Registered electors		23,466		
Majority		6,612	41.85	▲23.29
BN hold		Swing		

Johor state election, 1999
Party	Candidate	Votes	%	∆%
BN	Low Yu Wee	12,225	56.50	▼0.32
DAP	Pang Hok Liong	9,413	43.50	▲0.32
Total valid votes		21,638	100.00	
Total rejected ballots		603		
Unreturned ballots		153		
Turnout		22,394	72.30	▲0.82
Registered electors		30,974		
Majority		2,812	13.00	▼0.64
BN hold		Swing		

Johor state election, 1995
Party	Candidate	Votes	%	∆%
BN	Tay Khim Seng	11,234	56.82	▲15.03
DAP	Lim Sey Wee	8,538	43.18	▼15.03
Total valid votes		19,772	100.00	
Total rejected ballots		768		
Unreturned ballots		43		
Turnout		20,583	71.48	▼0.83
Registered electors		28,797		
Majority		2,696	13.64	▼2.79
BN gain from DAP		Swing		-

Johor state election, 1990
Party	Candidate	Votes	%	∆%
DAP	John Lim Wan Show	8,726	58.21	▼6.83
BN	Ng Kok Hwa	6,264	41.79	▲8.50
Total valid votes		14,990	100.00	
Total rejected ballots		348		
Unreturned ballots		19		
Turnout		15,357	72.30	▲1.78
Registered electors		21,240		
Majority		2,462	16.42	▼15.33
DAP hold		Swing		

Johor state election, 1986
Party	Candidate	Votes	%
DAP	Song Sing Kwee	8,954	65.04
BN	Ng Kok Hwa	4,583	33.29
SDP	Yeo Ser Kim	229	1.66
Total valid votes		13,766	100.00
Total rejected ballots		363	
Unreturned ballots		0	
Turnout		14,129	70.53
Registered electors		20,034	
Majority		4,371	31.75
This was a new constituency created.
