= Veerappen Veerathan =

Malaysian politician

Veerappen Veerathan வீரப்பன் வீராத்தான்

Member of the Malaysian Parliament for Seberang Selatan
- In office 1959–1964
- Parliamentary group: Socialist Front
- In office 1969–1974
- Parliamentary group: GERAKAN

Personal details
- Party: Labour Party of Malaya (1957-1968) GERAKAN (1968-1972); PEKEMAS (1972-)

Veerappen Veerathan (Tamil: வீரப்பன் வீராத்தான்; known as V. Veerappen) was a Malaysian lawyer and left-wing politician. A two-term MP first elected under the Labour Party of Malaya, he was known for founding the Parti Gerakan Rakyat Malaysia (Gerakan) together with Dr. Lim Chong Eu, Dr. Tan Chee Khoon and Dr. Syed Hussein Alatas. In 1972, he left Gerakan and founded the new party Parti Keadilan Masyarakat Malaysia (PEKEMAS).

== Political career ==
A practising lawyer, he was elected Seberang Selatan MP in 1959 representing the Labour Party of Malaya which was part of the Socialist Front (SF).

He secured 5,077 votes to defeat the MCA/Alliance's Tay Hooi Soo who got 4,313 votes and PMIP candidate Md Jais Sudin who got 3,093, thus winning by a margin of 764 votes.

In April 1964 he was defeated for the same seat, losing by 4,105 votes to Mohamed Noordin Mastan of the Alliance.

Six months later he recontested the seat in a by-election that was held following Noordin's death. On this occasion he lost to Snawi Ismail who secured 9,298 votes to win by a margin of 2,002 votes.

By 1965, the Socialist Front was decimated by detentions. Among those arrested and detained were Ahmad Boestaman, Ishak Haji Muhammad, Abdul Aziz Ishak, Datuk Kampo Radjo (later the president of PRM), Tan Kai Hee, Tan Hock Hin, Dr. Rajakumar, Hasnul Hadi, Tajuddin Kahar and hundreds of others.

In the next two years the Labour Party was taken over by Chinese-educated members with more extreme views.

Along with fellow leaders V. David and Tan Chee Khoon, as well as intellectual Syed Hussein Alatas and former MCA president Dr Lim Chong Eu, Veerapen was part of a group who formed Gerakan in 1968. Gerakan was successful in the 1969 general election, where it campaigned on a platform of social justice and the reduction or elimination of Bumiputra privileges outlined by Article 153 of the Constitution.

Veerappen himself defeated Snawi in a rematch at Seberang Selatan, winning by 3,347 votes. He also won the Sungai Bakap state seat as Gerakan swept the state of Penang.

However the elections were followed by racial riots and the elected representatives did not take their place until 1971. Under the leadership of Lim Chong Eu the party was brought into the Barisan Nasional coalition. This provoked a revolt within the party with Veerappen leaving alongside Syed Hussein, Chee Khoon and V David to form Pekemas.

In 1972, he called for Parliament to establish a committee to look into the workings of the Public Works Department.

In the 1974 elections, Pekemas suffered a crushing defeat with only party leader Tan Chee Khoon winning a parliamentary seat. Veerappen was defeated for the Nibong Tebal MP seat as well as the Bukit Tambun state seat. In the aftermath, Pekemas supporters and leaders such as V David shifted to the DAP.

== Election results ==
Parliament of the Federation of Malaya
Year	Constituency	Candidate	Votes	Pct	Opponent(s)	Votes	Pct	Ballots cast	Majority	Turnout
1959	P033 Seberang Selatan	Veerappen Veerathan (LPM)	5,077	40.67%	Tay Hooi Soo (MCA)	4,313	34.55%	12,590	764	79.08%
1959	P033 Seberang Selatan	Veerappen Veerathan (LPM)	5,077	40.67%	Md Jais Sudin (PMIP)	3,093	24.78%	12,590	764	79.08%

Parliament of Malaysia
Year	Constituency	Candidate	Votes	Pct	Opponent(s)	Votes	Pct	Ballots cast	Majority	Turnout
1964	P033 Seberang Selatan	Veerappen Veerathan (LPM)	6,322	36.74%	Mohamed Noordin Mastan (UMNO)	10,427	60.60%	17,909	4,105	84.48%
1964	P033 Seberang Selatan	Veerappen Veerathan (LPM)	6,322	36.74%	Mohamed Noor Mokhtar (PMIP)	457	2.66%	17,909	4,105	84.48%
1964	P033 Seberang Selatan	Veerappen Veerathan (LPM)	7,296	43.97%	Snawi Ismail (UMNO)	9,298	56.03%	16,791	2,002	NA
1969	P033 Seberang Selatan	Veerappen Veerathan (GERAKAN)	9,738	52.35%	Snawi Ismail (UMNO)	6,391	34.35%	19,287	3,347	78.49
1969	P033 Seberang Selatan	Veerappen Veerathan (GERAKAN)	9,738	52.35%	Wahab Salleh (PMIP)	2,474	13.30%	19,287	3,347	78.49
1974	P039 Nibong Tebal	Veerappen Veerathan (PEKEMAS)	3,155	16.13%	Goh Cheng Teik (GERAKAN)	11,271	57.63%	22,181	6,139	86.07
1974	P039 Nibong Tebal	Veerappen Veerathan (PEKEMAS)	3,155	16.13%	K. Ponnudurai (DAP)	5,132	26.24%	22,181	6,139	86.07

Penang State Legislative Assembly
Year	Constituency	Candidate	Votes	Pct	Opponent(s)	Votes	Pct	Ballots cast	Majority	Turnout
1959	Sungai Bakap	Veerappen Veerathan (LPM)	2,413	34.80%	Kee Yong Chin (MCA)	3,115	47.10%	7,029	2,720	77.30%
1959	Sungai Bakap	Veerappen Veerathan (LPM)	2,413	34.80%	Md. Noor Mahmood (Independent)	1,255	18.10%	7,029	2,720	77.30%
1969	Sungai Bakap	Veerappen Veerathan (GERAKAN)	5,519	51.86%	Kee Yong Chin (MCA)	3,115	29.27%	11,355	2,484	80.60%
1969	Sungai Bakap	Veerappen Veerathan (GERAKAN)	5,519	51.86%	Md. Noor Mahmood (Independent)	2,008	18.87%	11,355	2,484	80.60%
1974	Bukit Tambun	Veerappen Veerathan (PEKEMAS)	936	16.90%	Ng Swee Ching (DAP)	2,367	42.73%	5,836	130	83.80%
1974	Bukit Tambun	Veerappen Veerathan (PEKEMAS)	936	16.90%	Teoh Kooi Sneah (MCA)	2,237	40.38%	5,836	130	83.80%
