= List of Malaysian State Assembly Representatives (1959–1964) =

List of Malayan State and Settlement Council Representatives (1954–1959)
List of Malaysian State Assembly Representatives (1959–1964)
List of Malaysian State Assembly Representatives (1964–1969)

The following are the members of the Dewan Undangan Negeri or state assemblies, elected in the 1959 state election and by-elections. Also included is the list of the Singapore state assembly members who were elected in 1963.

== Perlis ==
No.	State Constituency	Member	Party
Alliance 12
N01	Kaki Bukit	Loh Ah Tong	Alliance (MCA)
N02	Paya	Wan Ahmad Wan Daud	Alliance (UMNO)
N03	Mata Ayer	Mahayuddin Habib	Alliance (UMNO)
N04	Bandar Kangar	Por Swee Giap	Alliance (MCA)
N05	Sena	Wan Ahmad Wan Kassim	Alliance (UMNO)
N06	Bintong	Sheikh Ahmad Mohd Hashim	Alliance (UMNO)
N07	Kurong Anai	Mokhtar Ismail	Alliance (UMNO)
N08	Arau	Tengku Adnan Tengku Yahya	Alliance (UMNO)
N09	Utan Aji	Syed Darus Syed Hashim	Alliance (UMNO)
N10	Kayang	Keria Wan Nik	Alliance (UMNO)
N11	Kuala Perlis	Yusoff Abu Bakar	Alliance (UMNO)
N12	Sanglang	Ahmad Musa	Alliance (UMNO)

== Kedah ==
No.	State Constituency	Member	Party
Alliance 24
N01	Jitra	Omar Salleh	Alliance (UMNO)
N02	Padang Terap	Syed Ahmad Syed Mahmud Shahabudin	Alliance (UMNO)
N03	Jerlun-Kodiang	Yahaya Abdul Jalil	Alliance (UMNO)
N04	Tunjang	Mustafa Ahmad	Alliance (UMNO)
N05	Langgar-Limbong	Omar Ahmad	Alliance (UMNO)
N06	Pokok Sena	Johari Salleh	Alliance (UMNO)
N07	Alor Star Pekan	Cheah Toon Lock	Alliance (MCA)
N08	Alor Star Luar	K. Karuna Karan Nair	Alliance (MIC)
N09	Langkawi	Ismail Ibrahim	Alliance (UMNO)
N10	Kota Star Barat	Mak Guan Pin	Alliance (MCA)
N11	Kangkong-Bukit Raya	Ali Ismail	Alliance (UMNO)
N12	Pendang	Syed Ibrahim Syed Kechik	Alliance (UMNO)
N13	Sik-Gurun	Hamidah Omar	Alliance (UMNO)
N14	Kota	Mohamed Zahir Ismail	Alliance (UMNO)
N15	Sala	Arshad Tunku Ismail	Alliance (UMNO)
N16	Yan-Merbok	Nyak Gam Nyak Abdullah	Alliance (UMNO)
N17	Baling Timor	Shafie Abdullah	Alliance (UMNO)
N18	Baling Barat	Syed Omar Syed Abdullah Shahabudin	Alliance (UMNO)
N19	Pekan Sungei Patani	Chin Chin Cheang	Alliance (MCA)
N20	Sungei Patani Luar	Azahari Md. Taib	Alliance (UMNO)
N21	Sidam	Yassin Ibrahim	Alliance (UMNO)
N22	Lunas	Soon Cheng Leong	Alliance (MCA)
N23	Kulim	Tai Kuan Yang	Alliance (MCA)
N24	Bandar Bahru	Zainuddin Din	Alliance (UMNO)

== Kelantan ==
No.	State Constituency	Member	Party
PMIP 28 | Alliance 2
N01	Tumpat Timor	Ishak Mustapha	PMIP
N02	Tumpat Tengah	Mustapha Awang	PMIP
N03	Tumpat Barat	Daud Bin Yusof	PMIP
N04	Kuala Kelantan	Wan Yusoff Wan Ya'acob	PMIP
N05	Kota Bharu Utara	Abdullah Ahmad	PMIP
N06	Kota Bharu Pantai	Nik Abdullah Arshad	PMIP
N07	Tendong	Che Hassan	PMIP
N08	Meranti	Nik Man Nik Mohamed	PMIP
N09	Bandar Pasir Mas	Omar Awang	PMIP
N10	Bandar Hilir	Wee Khoon Hock	Alliance (MCA)
N11	Bandar Hulu	Che Muda Yusof	PMIP
N12	Kota Bharu Tengah	Mohamad Asri Muda	PMIP
N13	Bachok Utara	Shafie Ahmad	PMIP
N14	Bachok Tengah	Mohd. Amin Ya'akub	PMIP
N15	Bachok Selatan	Othman Ismail	PMIP
N16	Kota Bharu Timor	Saufi Idris	PMIP
N17	Kota Bharu Barat	Abdul Rahman Awang Sulong	PMIP
N18	Kota Bharu Selatan	Ishak Lotfi Omar	PMIP
N19	Lemal	Haron Sulong	PMIP
N20	Rantau Panjang	Ahmad Yatim from 2 June 1962	PMIP
N20	Rantau Panjang	Abdul Rahman Daud until 1962	PMIP
N21	Tok Uban	Abdullah Yusoff	PMIP
N22	Pasir Puteh Utara	Tengku Mohamad Sultan	PMIP
N23	Pasir Puteh Tengah	Wan Sulaiman Ibrahim	PMIP
N24	Pasir Puteh Tenggara	Abd. Rahman Mohd. Salleh	PMIP
N25	Machang Utara	Mohamed Nasir	PMIP
N26	Tanah Merah Timor	Che Gu Daud	PMIP
N27	Tanah Merah Barat	Yusoff Abdul Latif	PMIP
N28	Machang Selatan	Mohamed Noor Yusoff	PMIP
N29	Ulu Kelantan Timor	Mohd. Ali Abdullah	Alliance (UMNO)
N30	Ulu Kelantan Barat	Khaidir Khatib	PMIP

== Trengganu ==
No.	State Constituency	Member	Party
PMIP 13 | Alliance 7 | Negara 4
N01	Kuala Besut	Wan Said Mohamed Nor	PMIP
N02	Kampong Raja	Mohamed Senari Yunus	PMIP
N03	Ulu Besut	Husin Jusoh	PMIP
N04	Besut Tengah	Mohamed Ismail	PMIP
N05	Setiu	Mohamed Daud Abdul Samad	PMIP
N06	Batu Rakit	Mansor Mohamed	Alliance (UMNO)
N07	Kuala Nerus	Ibrahim Fikri Mohamed	Alliance (UMNO)
N08	Jeram	Ahmad Azam Napiah	PMIP
N09	Langkap	Ismail Abbas	Negara
N10	Bandar	Tan Eng Aun	Alliance (MCA)
N11	Ladang	Wan Daud Wan Ahmad	Negara
N12	Bukit Besar	Mohamed Abdul Rahman	Negara
N13	Batu Burok	Abdul Muttalib Salleh	Negara
N14	Marang	Mohamed Taib Sabri Abu Bakar	PMIP
N15	Sura	Abu Bakar Mohamed Salleh	PMIP
N16	Ulu Dungun	Omar Shukri Embong	PMIP
N17	Paka-Kerteh	Sulong Mahmood	Alliance (UMNO)
N18	Kemaman Utara	Wan Abdul Ghani Zainal	Alliance (UMNO)
N19	Chukai	Yeo Eng Cho	Alliance (MCA)
N20	Kemaman Selatan	Mohamed Taha Embong	Alliance (UMNO)
N21	Kuala Trengganu Tengah	Abdul Kadir Mohamed	PMIP
N22	Binjai	Shafie Sulong	PMIP
N23	Ulu Trengganu Timor	Ismail Yusof	PMIP
N24	Ulu Trengganu Barat	Omar Abdul Rahman	PMIP

== Penang ==
No.	State Constituency	Member	Party
Alliance 17 | Socialist Front 7
N01	Butterworth	P. L. Yegappan	Alliance (MIC)
N02	Bagan Ajam	Phee Joo Teik	Alliance (MCA)
N03	Permatang Pauh	Ariffin Shariff	Alliance (UMNO)
N04	Bukit Mertajam	Wong Pow Nee	Alliance (MCA)
N05	Alma	Sulaiman Ahmad	Alliance (UMNO)
N06	Sungei Bakap	Kee Yong Chin	Alliance (MCA)
N07	Nibong Tebal	Sahid Hassan	Alliance (UMNO)
N08	Kelawei	Tan Kim Hoe	Alliance (MCA)
N09	Doby Ghaut	C. D. Ismail	Alliance (UMNO)
N10	Tanjong Bungah	Cheah Seng Khim	Alliance (MCA)
N11	Ayer Itam	Chor Sin Kheng	Alliance (MCA)
N12	Jelutong	Ooi Thiam Siew	Socialist Front (Lab)
N13	Glugor	Aziz Ibrahim	Alliance (UMNO)
N14	Balik Pulau	Ahmad Mohamed Taib from 14 December 1963	Alliance (UMNO)
N14	Balik Pulau	Mohamed Hassan Kassim until 1963	Alliance (UMNO)
N15	Bayan Lepas	Rifaie Salleh	Alliance (UMNO)
N16	Kota	Lee Kok Liang	Socialist Front (Lab)
N17	Tanjong Tengah	Wong Choong Woh	Socialist Front (Lab)
N18	Tanjong Utara	Yuen Fook Cheong	Socialist Front (Lab)
N19	Tanjong Barat	Tan Chong Bee	Socialist Front (Lab)
N20	Sungei Pinang	D. S. Ramanathan	Socialist Front (Lab)
N21	Tanjong Selatan	Choy Chee Yew	Socialist Front (Lab)
N22	Muda	Ismail Che Cik	Alliance (UMNO)
N23	Kepala Batas	Ahmad Abdullah	Alliance (UMNO)
N24	Tasek Glugor	Hashim Awang	Alliance (UMNO)

== Perak ==
No.	State Constituency	Member	Party
Alliance 31 | PPP 8 | PMIP 1
N01	Grik	Din Jusoh from 8 June 1960	Alliance (UMNO)
N01	Grik	Mohamed Ghazali Jawi until 1960	Alliance (UMNO)
N02	Lenggong	Ahmad Said	Alliance (UMNO)
N03	Parit Buntar	Halimah Abdul Raof	Alliance (UMNO)
N04	Kuala Kurau	Samsudin Ahmad	Alliance (UMNO)
N05	Bagan Serai	Masud Untoi	Alliance (UMNO)
N06	Gunong Semanggol	Baharuddin Abdul Latif	PMIP
N07	Larut	Kamaruddin Mohamed Isa	Alliance (UMNO)
N08	Selama	Hussein Yaacob	Alliance (UMNO)
N09	Matang	Wan Othman Wan Omar	Alliance (UMNO)
N10	Taiping	Goh Chok Sam	Alliance (MCA)
N11	Ayer Tawar	Lee Khing Hoe	Alliance (MCA)
N12	Pengkalan Bharu	Ishak Mohamed	Alliance (UMNO)
N13	Lekir	Wong Ting Seng	Alliance (MCA)
N14	Lumut	Liew Whye Hone	Alliance (MCA)
N15	Karai	Mohamed Ali Zaini Mohamed Zain	Alliance (UMNO)
N16	Jalong	See Khoon Lim	Alliance (MCA)
N17	Senggang	Shaari Piai	Alliance (UMNO)
N18	Padang Rengas	Abas Adam	Alliance (UMNO)
N19	Blanja	Mohamed Haron Kulop Seman	Alliance (UMNO)
N20	Kampong Gajah	Ismail Karim	Alliance (UMNO)
N21	Sungei Raia	Chin Foon	PPP
N22	Chemor	Teoh Kim Swee	PPP
N23	Pekan Lama	Toh Seang Eng	PPP
N24	Pekan Bharu	D. R. Seenivasagam	PPP
N25	Pasir Puteh	Mohamed Fajar Ali Hassan	PPP
N26	Kuala Pari	S. P. Seenivasagam	PPP
N27	Pusing	Khong Kok Tat	PPP
N28	Tanjong Tualang	Too Joon Hing	Alliance (MCA)
N29	Gopeng	Hor Hock Lung	PPP
N30	Kuala Dipang	Teh Siew Eng	Alliance (MCA)
N31	Sungei Manik	Yahya Shubban Harun	Alliance (UMNO)
N32	Bandar	Ahmad Razali Mohamed	Alliance (UMNO)
N33	Pasir Bedamar	Wah Keng Jooi	Alliance (MCA)
N34	Batak Rabit	Som Abdullah	Alliance (UMNO)
N35	Rungkup	Loppe Hashim Ketong	Alliance (UMNO)
N36	Hutan Melintang	Sulaiman Bulon	Alliance (UMNO)
N37	Tapah Road	Mohamed Jumah Mat Satir	Alliance (UMNO)
N38	Tapah	Thum Yeng Yong	Alliance (MCA)
N39	Bidor	V. P. Pillai	Alliance (MIC)
N40	Slim	Yang Abdul Rashid Abdul Wahab	Alliance (UMNO)

== Pahang ==
No.	State Constituency	Member	Party
Alliance 23 | IND 1
N01	Cameron Highlands	Yong Hong Chong	IND
N02	Dong	Che Yeop Sendiri Hussin	Alliance (UMNO)
N03	Bandar Raub	Chua Yong Guan	Alliance (MCA)
N04	Tras	Sulaiman Sabudin	Alliance (UMNO)
N05	Sabai	Abu Bakar Ahmad	Alliance (UMNO)
N06	Bandar Bentong	Chow Seng Tong	Alliance (MCA)
N07	Benus	Chow Teck Noe	Alliance (MCA)
N08	Mentekab	Salehuddin Awang Pekan	Alliance (UMNO)
N09	Tanah Puteh	Wong Kwan Tan	Alliance (MCA)
N10	Telok Sisek	Mahimon Harun	Alliance (UMNO)
N11	Beserah	Abdul Aziz Ahmad	Alliance (UMNO)
N12	Ulu Kuantan	Zainuddin Ahmad	Alliance (UMNO)
N13	Kuala Pahang	Muhammad Jusoh	Alliance (UMNO)
N14	Pahang Tua	Mohammed Moktar Daud from 30 March 1963	Alliance (UMNO)
N14	Pahang Tua	Ahmad Othman until 1963	Alliance (UMNO)
N15	Rompin	Ibrahim Arshad	Alliance (UMNO)
N16	Chenor	Wan Abdul Aziz Ungku Abdullah	Alliance (UMNO)
N17	Triang	Lum Wah Kum @ Lum Ban Kee	Alliance (MCA)
N18	Kuala Semantan	Awang Ngah Tok Muda Ibrahim	Alliance (UMNO)
N19	Jenderak	Mohamed Yusoff Long	Alliance (UMNO)
N20	Sanggang	Yahya Mohd Seth	Alliance (UMNO)
N21	Jelai	Muhammad Nor Sulaiman	Alliance (UMNO)
N22	Kuala Lipis	Seong Sik Yong (Chinese: 宋锡扬)	Alliance (MCA)
N23	Tanjong Besar	Mohamed Khairuddin Mohamed Kawi	Alliance (UMNO)
N24	Jerantut	Abdullah Mohamed Akil	Alliance (UMNO)

== Selangor ==
No.	State Constituency	Member	Party
Alliance 23 | Socialist Front 3 | IND 2
N01	Tanjong Karang	Raja Rome Raja Ma'amor	Alliance (UMNO)
N02	Kuala Selangor Pekan	Tan Siew Kang	Alliance (MCA)
N03	Kepong	Chan Keong Hon	Alliance (MCA)
N04	Penchala	Lim Jew Siang	Alliance (MCA)
N05	Jeram	Hussain Abdullah	Alliance (UMNO)
N06	Sementa	Masod Hayati	Alliance (UMNO)
N07	Serendah	V. Rajah	IND
N08	Kuang	Chong Shih Guan	Alliance (MCA)
N09	Kajang	Mustafa Yunus	Alliance (UMNO)
N10	Semenyih	Kampo Radjo	Alliance (UMNO)
N11	Ampang	Muhyeeddin Mohamed Zakaria	Alliance (UMNO)
N12	Sentul	Nazar Nong	Socialist Front (Ra'ayat)
N13	Pantai	V. David	Socialist Front (Lab)
N14	Salak	Douglas K. K. Lee	Alliance (MCA)
N15	Bukit Nanas	Lee Yoon Thim	Alliance (MCA)
N16	Kampong Bharu	Abdullah Yassin	Alliance (UMNO)
N17	Serdang	Karam Singh Veriah	Socialist Front (Ra'ayat)
N18	Bukit Raja	Murugesu Sundram	Alliance (MIC)
N19	Port Swettenham	Adnan Chik from 12 January 1963	Alliance (UMNO)
N19	Port Swettenham	Abdullah Hassan until 1963	Alliance (UMNO)
N20	Kampong Jawa	Cheong Jin Hoe	Alliance (MCA)
N21	Telok Datoh	Hormat Rafei from 7 September 1963	Alliance (UMNO)
N21	Telok Datoh	Raja Ismail Raja Ibrahim until 1963	Alliance (UMNO)
N22	Morib	Mohamed Tahir Abdul Majid	Alliance (UMNO)
N23	Dengkil	Abu Bakar Baginda	Alliance (UMNO)
N24	Sungei Rawang	Lim Tuan Siong	IND
N25	Sabak	Mustafa Abdul Jabar	Alliance (UMNO)
N26	Sungei Besar	Taiban Hassan	Alliance (UMNO)
N27	Ulu Bernam	Noor Yusof	Alliance (UMNO)
N28	Kuala Kubu	Wong Swee Soon	Alliance (MCA)

== Negri Sembilan ==
No.	State Constituency	Member	Party
Alliance 20 | Socialist Front 3 | IND 1
N01	Sri Menanti	Abdul Samad Idris	Alliance (UMNO)
N02	Johol	Abu Kassim Saad	Alliance (UMNO)
N03	Ulu Muar	Ariffin Ali	Alliance (UMNO)
N04	Pilah	Mohd Idris Matsil	Alliance (UMNO)
N05	Rantau	Gurnam Singh Gill	Socialist Front (Lab)
N06	Sungei Ujong	Lim Kee Siong	Alliance (MCA)
N07	Rahang	Han Hiu Fong	Alliance (MCA)
N08	Terentang	Siti Rahmah Kassim	Alliance (UMNO)
N09	Kota	Mohd. Yusof Abdullah	Alliance (UMNO)
N10	Tampin	Mohamad Taha Talib	Alliance (UMNO)
N11	Gemas	Goh Boh Tah from 3 February 1962	Alliance (MCA)
N11	Gemas	Fong Yew Wang until 1962	Socialist Front (Lab)
N11	Gemas	Fong Yew Wang until 1962	Alliance (MCA)
N12	Jimah	C. Letchumanan	Alliance (MIC)
N13	Lukut	Chin See Yin	Alliance (MCA)
N14	Si Rusa	Awaludin Ahmad	Alliance (UMNO)
N15	Pasir Panjang	M. Muthucumaru	Alliance (MIC)
N16	Linggi	Mohamed Said Muhammad	Alliance (UMNO)
N17	Kuala Klawang	Lim Kim Kee	Alliance (MCA)
N18	Pertang	Aminuddin Abdul Manap	IND
N19	Bahau	Thong Hiang Kim	Alliance (MCA)
N20	Rompin	Lim Kee Sai	Alliance (MCA)
N21	Jempol	Mohd. Khatib Mohd. Nor	Alliance (UMNO)
N22	Lenggeng	Abdul Jalil Aminuddin	Alliance (UMNO)
N23	Labu	S. Sathappan	Socialist Front (Lab)
N24	Bukit Nanas	Lee Tee Siong	Alliance (MCA)

== Malacca ==
No.	State Constituency	Member	Party
Alliance 20
N01	Tanjong Kling	Abdul Ghafar Baba	Alliance (UMNO)
N02	Bukit Rambai	Hassan Mansor	Alliance (UMNO)
N03	Batu Berendam	Mohamed Abdul Rahman	Alliance (UMNO)
N04	Semabok	Bulat Mohamed	Alliance (UMNO)
N05	Kandang	Tawi @ Tawy Abdul Hamid	Alliance (UMNO)
N06	Kota Selatan	Goh Joon Hoe	Alliance (MCA)
N07	Kota Tengah	Khoo Chua Seng from 29 December 1960	Alliance (MCA)
N07	Kota Tengah	Goh Chee Yan until 2 November 1960	Alliance (MCA)
N08	Kota Barat	Goh Kay Seng	Alliance (MCA)
N09	Kota Utara	Tan Cheng See	Alliance (MCA)
N10	Kota Timor	Lim Yeow Koon	Alliance (MCA)
N11	Sungei Bahru	Tamby Chik Abdul Karim	Alliance (UMNO)
N12	Ramuan China	Mohamed Sudin Abdul Rahman	Alliance (UMNO)
N13	Masjid Tanah	Hassan Ya'akub	Alliance (UMNO)
N14	Alor Gajah	Talib Karim	Alliance (UMNO)
N15	Pulau Sebang	Yeow Kay	Alliance (MCA)
N16	Batang Malacca	Abdul Malek Nong	Alliance (UMNO)
N17	Rim	Tan Nai Kwi	Alliance (MCA)
N18	Jasin	Noordin Sa'at	Alliance (UMNO)
N19	Serkam	Abdul Chudang	Alliance (UMNO)
N20	Sungei Rambai	Ibrahim Abdul Hamid	Alliance (UMNO)

== Johore ==
No.	State Constituency	Member	Party
Alliance 28 | Socialist Front 3 | IND 1
N01	Bukit Serampang	Hassan Yunus	Alliance (UMNO)
N02	Jorak	Othman Saat	Alliance (UMNO)
N03	Labis	Elias Abu Bakar	Alliance (UMNO)
N04	Bekok	Phang Voon Liat	IND
N05	Bandar Maharani	Chua Song Lim	Alliance (MCA)
N06	Parit Bakar	Kosai Mohamed Salleh	Alliance (UMNO)
N07	Simpang Kiri	Tan Chin Cheong	Alliance (MCA)
N08	Parit Jawa	Sulaiman Ninam Shah	Alliance (UMNO)
N09	Broleh	Abdul Wahid Sulaiman	Alliance (UMNO)
N10	Bandar Penggaram	Tan Peng Khoon	Alliance (MCA)
N11	Tanjong Sembrong	Mohamed Noor Juma'at	Alliance (UMNO)
N12	Ayer Hitam	Noordin Hashim	Alliance (UMNO)
N13	Gunong Lambak	Lee Ah Leng	Socialist Front (Lab)
N14	Sri Lalang	Ong Kai Beng (王介民) from 22 May 1960	Alliance (MCA)
N14	Sri Lalang	Cheong Soo Kheng until 1960	Alliance (MCA)
N15	Kota Tinggi	Ismail Sa'adon	Alliance (UMNO)
N16	Johore Lama	Lee Yeak Khim	Alliance (MCA)
N17	Rengit	Taha Zakaria	Alliance (UMNO)
N18	Benut	Bachok @ Abdul Majid Hashim	Alliance (UMNO)
N19	Pontian Dalam	Lebai Mohamed Yaacob	Alliance (UMNO)
N20	Pontian Kechil	Abdul Rahman Mohammed Amin from 24 June 1961	Alliance (UMNO)
N20	Pontian Kechil	Abdullah Mohsin until 26 April 1961	Alliance (UMNO)
N21	Rengam	Ismail Hassan	Alliance (UMNO)
N22	Senai-Kulai	Soh Kim Siam	Socialist Front (Lab)
N23	Plentong	Fatimah Abdul Majid from 23 November 1959	Alliance (UMNO)
N23	Plentong	Mohamad Noah Omar until 1959	Alliance (UMNO)
N24	Tanjong Petri	Chu Choon Yong	Socialist Front (Lab)
N25	Glang Patah	Syed Mohamed Edros	Alliance (UMNO)
N26	Tampoi	Rahmat Daud	Alliance (UMNO)
N27	Endau	Ali Affendi Ahmad	Alliance (UMNO)
N28	Mersing	Poh Swee Lim	Alliance (MCA)
N29	Batu Anam	M. P. Kumaran	Alliance (MIC)
N30	Bandar Segamat	Hatta Mohamed Salleh	Alliance (UMNO)
N31	Tangkak	Lai Kuen Tee	Alliance (MCA)
N32	Serom	Abdul Latiff Omar	Alliance (UMNO)

== Singapore ==
=== 1963–1965 ===
No.	State Constituency	Member	Party
PAP 37 | BS 13 | UPP 1
N01	Aljunied	Suppiah Visva Lingam	PAP
N02	Anson	Perumal Govindasamy	PAP
N03	Bras Basah	Ho See Beng	PAP
N04	Bukit Merah	Lim Huan Boon	BS
N05	Bukit Panjang	Ong Lian Teng	BS
N06	Bukit Timah	Lee Tee Tong	BS
N07	Cairnhill	Lim Kim San	PAP
N08	Changi	Sim Boon Woo	PAP
N09	Choa Chu Kang	Chio Cheng Thun	BS
N10	Crawford	S. Thendayatha Bani	BS
N11	Delta	Chan Choy Siong	PAP
N12	Farrer Park	S. R. Dharmarajoo	PAP
N13	Geylang East	Hoo Cheng Choon	PAP
N14	Geylang Serai	Rahmat Kenap	PAP
N15	Geylang West	Yong Nyuk Lin	PAP
N16	Havelock	Loh Miaw Gong	BS
N17	Hong Lim	Ong Eng Guan	UPP
N18	Jalan Besar	Chan Chee Seng	PAP
N19	Jalan Kayu	Tan Cheng Tong	BS
N20	Joo Chiat	Fong Kim Heng	PAP
N21	Jurong	Chia Thye Poh	BS
N22	Kallang	Buang Omar Junid	PAP
N23	Kampong Glam	Rajaratnam Sinnathamby	PAP
N24	Kampong Kapor	Mahmud Awang	PAP
N25	Kampong Kembangan	Mohamed Ariff Suradi	PAP
N26	Kreta Ayer	Goh Keng Swee	PAP
N27	Moulmein	Dhanam Avadai	PAP
N28	Mountbatten	Ng Yeow Chong	PAP
N29	Nee Soon	Chan Sun Wing	BS
N30	Pasir Panjang	Othman Wok	PAP
N31	Paya Lebar	Kow Kee Seng	BS
N32	Punggol	Ng Kah Ting	PAP
N33	Queenstown	Jek Yeun Thong	PAP
N34	River Valley	Lim Cheng Lock	PAP
N35	Rochore	Toh Chin Chye	PAP
N36	Sembawang	Teong Eng Siong	PAP
N37	Sepoy Lines	Wee Toon Boon	PAP
N38	Serangoon Gardens	Raphael Alfred Gonzales	PAP
N39	Siglap	Abdul Rahim Ishak	PAP
N40	Southern Islands	Yaacob Mohamed	PAP
N41	Stamford	Andrew Fong Sip Chee	PAP
N42	Tampines	Poh Ber Liak	BS
N43	Tanglin	Edmund William Barker	PAP
N44	Tanjong Pagar	Lee Kuan Yew	PAP
N45	Telok Ayer	Ong Pang Boon	PAP
N46	Telok Blangah	Bernard Rodrigues	PAP
N47	Thomson	Koo Young	BS
N48	Tiong Bahru	Lee Teck Him	PAP
N49	Toa Payoh	Wong Soon Fong	BS
N50	Ulu Pandan	Chow Chiok Hock	PAP
N51	Upper Serangoon	Sia Kah Hui	PAP
