= United Front (Malaysia) =

- Founded: 1966
- Dissolved: unknown
- Preceded by: Malayan Peoples' Socialist Front (SF)
- Membership: LPM; PPP
- Ideology: Anti-colonialism
- Political position: Big tent

The United Front was a Malaysian coalition of political parties. It was established in 1966 between the Labour Party of Malaya (LPM) and the People's Progressive Party (PPP).

The formation of the coalition was preceded by Labour's exit from the Malayan Peoples' Socialist Front in January 1966, which followed Parti Rakyat's (PR) departure. Soon after, negotiations to form a "Grand Opposition" against the then-ruling Alliance began, involving the PPP, LPM, PR, the United Democratic Party (UDP) led by Malaysian Chinese Association (MCA) renegade Lim Chong Eu, the newly formed successor to the Malayan-branch of the Singaporean People's Action Party (PAP); the Democratic Action Party (DAP), and the Pan-Malayan Islamic Party (PMIP). Negotiations were hampered by differences between parties such as the PPP, UDP, and DAP, which generally supported the formation of Malaysia on one hand, and the LPM, PR, and PMIP, who were critical of the new federation on the other. In February, the Labour Party and People's Progressive Party defined the minimum programme, which included four principles for unity between the opposition:

1. To work for the establishment of a "democratic and constitutional" government with social justice and economic equality for all its peoples.
2. To "defend the fundamental liberties" and the revocation of the Internal Security Act, the Societies Act and laws which prevent the freedom of association, meeting, and action.
3. To condemn all forms of colonialism and aggression and interference in the internal affairs of other countries.
4. They are of the view that Malaysia was not formed as a result of genuine democratic will of the people and therefore calls for a free plebiscite in the Borneo States without foreign interference.

The People's Progressive Party and its leader D. R. Seenivasagam insisted that the four principles did not come into conflict with those of the Malaysian Solidarity Convention or its goal of a Malaysian Malaysia, arguing it "should be acceptable to anybody who believes in a constitutional democracy under a socialist form of Government." The PMIP announced it would not join the proposed United Front as it did not share the coalition's principles. In March, it was announced that Labour Party chairman Lim Kean Seaw and secretary-general V. David had been appointed pro-tem chairman and secretary-general of the United Front respectively. The chairman of the Democratic Action Party, Devan Nair, criticised the Labour Party in a letter published in The Straits Times where he accused Labour of impairing the emergence of a "loyal opposition" (see the Indonesia–Malaysia confrontation which occurred during this period) and accused it of parroting communist rhetoric. In response, V. David announced that the DAP would not be allowed into the United Front, despite D. R. Seenisvasagam's previous insistence on their inclusion, claiming the policies of the former as well as the Malaysian Solidarity Convention, of which both the PPP and DAP were members, stood in opposition to those of the Front.
