= Tan Kai Hee =

Malaysian politician (1937–2022)

Tan Kai Hee (8 January 1937 – 22 February 2022) was a notable figure in Malaysia who was firstly a socialist politician and political prisoner. After many years of detention without trial, he returned to civilian life and started a traditional medicine business Hai-O which made him a multi-millionaire. He continued to fund a number of progressive causes through philanthropy.

== Early life ==
Born in Kluang, Johor, Tan worked a number of odd jobs including on rubber estates, a canning factory, a bicycle shop and night markets. This was because when he was 13, his father was deported back to China and his mother and six siblings returned, while Kai Hee and two other children stayed in Malaya having to fend for themselves.

== Political career ==
This gave him an understanding of the difficulties faced by the poor and he joined the Labour Party of Malaya in the 1950s, rising to become its deputy secretary-general in the early 1960s. At that time the Labour Party was part of a powerful multi-racial coalition with the Parti Rakyat Malaysia called the Socialist Front (Malayan Peoples' Socialist Front).

A protege of Labour Party leader Dr M.K. Rajakumar, Tan was one of a number of very young Socialist Front candidates in the 1959 general elections including V. David, who was elected Bangsar MP at the age of 26, and Karam Singh Veriah who won in Damansara aged just 22.

Tan however was defeated in that election when he ran for the Kluang Selatan seat. He lost by a margin of 4,214 votes to Chan Chong Wen of MCA/Alliance who garnered 8,754 votes compared to the 4,540 that Tan obtained.

He also contested in the 1964 elections in Damansara the seat that had been won by Karam Singh Veriah in 1959. However, he was narrowly beaten in a three-way contest by 546 votes as Michael Chen Wing Sum of the MCA/Alliance Party got 9,144 votes while he obtained 8,602 and PAP's Lam Khuan Kit trailed in third with 3,191 votes.

In 1965, he was arrested alongside other Socialist Front leaders such as chairman Hasnul Hadi and secretary-general Tajuddin Kahar as they were planning a demonstration to commemorate the second anniversary of the detention of former Setapak MP and Socialist Front leader Ahmad Boestamam.

Tan was detained for eight years during which time the Socialist Front was dissolved and the Labour Party of Malaya became first dormant, then defunct with a number of its leaders like Tan Chee Khoon and V. David going on to form Parti Gerakan Rakyat Malaysia.

== Herbal medicine entrepreneur ==
In the initial years following his release in 1973, Tan struggled to get a job. However, his luck turned in 1975, when he founded Hai-O Enterprise, a company that imported herbs and medicines from China.

After a slow start, he turned it into a multi-million ringgit enterprise and also held positions in the Malaysia-China Friendship Association and the Malaysia-China Chamber of Commerce.

As he approached his 80s, Tan decided to hand over the day to day running of the company to his son Tan Keng Kang in 2016. The following year his wife Tan Siow Eng died.

At his 80th birthday dinner in January 2017, he announced that he would give most of his Hai-O shares, reportedly worth over RM100million, to a trust fund he had set up to fund charitable works.

In 2018, Tan published a book on his life called Tan Kai Hee: Soaring Without Fear And Regrets.

== Death ==
Tan died on 22 February 2022, aged 85.

== Election results ==
Parliament of the Federation of Malaya
Year	Constituency	Candidate	Votes	Pct	Opponent(s)	Votes	Pct	Ballots cast	Majority	Turnout
1959	P099 Kluang Selatan	Tan Kai Hee (LPM)	4,540	34.15%	Chan Chong Wen (MCA)	98,754	65.85%	13,444	4,214	79.64%

Parliament of Malaysia
Year	Constituency	Candidate	Votes	Pct	Opponent(s)	Votes	Pct	Ballots cast	Majority	Turnout
1964	P073 Damansara	Tan Kai Hee (LPM)	8,602	41.08%	Michael Chen Wing Sum (MCA)	9,148	43.68%	21,797	546	72.52%
1964	P073 Damansara	Tan Kai Hee (LPM)	8,602	41.08%	Lam Khuan Kit (PAP)	3,191	15.24%	21,797	546	72.52%
