= Tajuddin Kahar =

- تاجو الدين كهار

Secretary General of Malayan Peoples' Socialist Front

Secretary General of Parti Rakyat Malaysia

Personal details
- Born: Tajuddin Kahar; 23 September 1923 Batu Gajah, Perak, Malaysia
- Died: 2005 (aged 81–82)
- Party: Parti Rakyat Malaysia (PRM) (1961–2005)
- Other political affiliations: Malayan Peoples' Socialist Front (SF) (1961–1964)
- Occupation: Politician, journalist

Tajuddin Kahar (1923-2005) was a socialist politician as secretary general of the Malayan Peoples' Socialist Front and political detainee in Malaysia.

== Life and career ==
Kahar was born in Batu Gajah, Perak on 23, September, 1923 and was a left-wing journalist in the early Utusan Melayu where he rose to be a news editor.

When the newspaper was taken over by the country's dominant political party Umno in 1961, Tajuddin was also active in defending workers' rights and press freedom. He was a leader of strike action, alongside Said Zahari and Usman Awang to protest the takeover.

Upon his sacking from Utusan, he joined the Parti Rakyat Malaysia and soon became secretary-general of both PRM and the Socialist Front.

In 1964 he contested the Setapak parliamentary seat losing to Alliance/MCA candidate Chan Seong Yoon. He also lost in the Selangor state polls in Kajang, where he was defeated by Mohamed Nazir Abdul Jalil of the Alliance Party by 3,591 votes.

In 1965 Tajuddin and other key Socialist Front leaders, such as chairman Hasnul Abdul Hadi and assistant secretary-general Tan Kai Hee were arrested to foil a demonstration called for 13 February to commemorate the second anniversary of PRM leader Ahmad Boestamam’s internment.

He was eventually released after four years of detention without trial on March 12, 1969.

Tajuddin was described by former PRM leader Syed Husin Ali as soft-spoken, disciplined and a quiet organiser who spent a lot of time building the party.

He died in 2005 aged 82.

== Election results ==
Parliament of Malaysia
Year	Constituency	Candidate	Votes	Pct	Opponent(s)	Votes	Pct	Ballots cast	Majority	Turnout
1964	P070 Setapak, Selangor	Tajuddin Kahar (Socialist Front)	7,888	32.34%	Chan Seong Yoon (MCA)	12,292	50.39%	24,394	4,404	68.22%
1964	P070 Setapak, Selangor	Tajuddin Kahar (Socialist Front)	7,888	32.34%	K. V. Thaver (PAP)	4,214	17.27%	24,394	4,404	68.22%

Selangor State Legislative Assembly
Year	Constituency	Candidate	Votes	Pct	Opponent(s)	Votes	Pct	Ballots cast	Majority	Turnout
1964	Kajang	Tajuddin Kahar (Socialist Front)	7,888	32.34%	Dato Mohd Nazir Bin Abdul Jalil (UMNO)	6,036	71.17%	8,481	3,591	79.37%
