= 1964 Malaysian state elections =

State assembly elections were held in Malaysia on 25 April 1964 in all states except Sabah, Sarawak and Singapore.

== Results ==
=== Johore ===
Party or alliance		Votes	%	Seats	+/–
Alliance Party	United Malays National Organisation	115,053	43.48	20	0
Alliance Party	Malaysian Chinese Association	58,560	22.13	11	+4
Alliance Party	Malaysian Indian Congress	5,316	2.01	1	0
Alliance Party	Total	178,929	67.61	32	+4
Malayan Peoples'; Socialist Front	Labour Party of Malaya	51,753	19.56	0	–3
Malayan Peoples'; Socialist Front	Parti Ra'ayat	11,009	4.16	0	0
Malayan Peoples'; Socialist Front	Total	62,762	23.72	0	–3
United Democratic Party		8,785	3.32	0	New
Pan-Malayan Islamic Party		6,334	2.39	0	0
People's Action Party		1,098	0.41	0	New
Independents		6,727	2.54	0	–1
Total		264,635	100.00	32	0
Valid votes		264,635	95.20		
Invalid/blank votes		13,343	4.80		
Total votes		277,978	100.00		
Registered voters/turnout		344,922	80.59		
Source: Almanak Keputusan Pilihan Raya Umum: Parlimen & Dewan Undangan Negeri (1959-1999)

Registered voters for the above refers to total registered voters of contested constituencies. Total electors of Johore is 377336 which includes uncontested constituencies of Muar Dalam, Parit Jawa and Johore Lama.

=== Kedah ===
Party or alliance		Votes	%	Seats	+/–
Alliance Party	United Malays National Organisation	122,446	50.22	18	0
Alliance Party	Malayan Chinese Association	35,026	14.36	5	0
Alliance Party	Malayan Indian Congress	7,345	3.01	1	0
Alliance Party	Total	164,817	67.59	24	0
Pan-Malayan Islamic Party		61,294	25.14	0	0
Malayan Peoples'; Socialist Front	Labour Party of Malaya	9,590	3.93	0	0
Malayan Peoples'; Socialist Front	Parti Ra'ayat	2,498	1.02	0	0
Malayan Peoples'; Socialist Front	Total	12,088	4.96	0	0
United Democratic Party		4,256	1.75	0	0
Independents		1,386	0.57	0	0
Total		243,841	100.00	24	0
Valid votes		243,841	94.48		
Invalid/blank votes		14,255	5.52		
Total votes		258,096	100.00		
Registered voters/turnout		336,858	76.62		
Source: Almanak Keputusan Pilihan Raya Umum: Parlimen & Dewan Undangan Negeri (1959-1999)

=== Kelantan ===
Party or alliance		Votes	%	Seats	+/–
Pan-Malayan Islamic Party		118,498	57.00	21	–7
Alliance Party	United Malays National Organisation	84,722	40.76	8	+7
Alliance Party	Malaysian Chinese Association	4,657	2.24	1	0
Alliance Party	Total	89,379	43.00	9	+7
Total		207,877	100.00	30	0
Valid votes		207,877	95.48		
Invalid/blank votes		9,852	4.52		
Total votes		217,729	100.00		
Registered voters/turnout		271,731	80.13		
Source: Almanak Keputusan Pilihan Raya Umum: Parlimen & Dewan Undangan Negeri (1959-1999)

=== Malacca ===
Party or alliance		Votes	%	Seats	+/–
Alliance Party	United Malays National Organisation	45,778	44.80	13	0
Alliance Party	Malaysian Chinese Association	18,081	17.69	4	–3
Alliance Party	Malaysian Indian Congress	2,734	2.68	1	New
Alliance Party	Total	66,593	65.17	18	–2
Malayan Peoples'; Socialist Front	Parti Ra'ayat	14,326	14.02	0	0
Malayan Peoples'; Socialist Front	Labour Party of Malaya	13,095	12.81	2	+2
Malayan Peoples'; Socialist Front	Total	27,421	26.83	2	+2
Pan-Malayan Islamic Party		5,416	5.30	0	0
People's Progressive Party		2,666	2.61	0	0
Independents		90	0.09	0	0
Total		102,186	100.00	20	0
Valid votes		102,186	96.56		
Invalid/blank votes		3,640	3.44		
Total votes		105,826	100.00		
Registered voters/turnout		125,585	84.27		
Source: Almanak Keputusan Pilihan Raya Umum: Parlimen & Dewan Undangan Negeri (1959-1999)

=== Negri Sembilan ===
Party or alliance		Votes	%	Seats	+/–
Alliance Party	United Malays National Organisation	39,739	33.98	14	+3
Alliance Party	Malaysian Chinese Association	25,856	22.11	9	+2
Alliance Party	Malaysian Indian Congress	3,226	2.76	1	–1
Alliance Party	Total	68,461	58.55	24	+4
Malayan Peoples'; Socialist Front	Labour Party of Malaya	16,280	13.92	0	–3
Malayan Peoples'; Socialist Front	Parti Ra'ayat	7,874	6.73	0	0
Malayan Peoples'; Socialist Front	Total	24,154	20.66	0	–3
United Democratic Party		13,434	11.49	0	New
Pan-Malayan Islamic Party		3,837	3.28	0	0
People's Progressive Party		2,318	1.98	0	0
Independents		4,368	3.74	0	-1
Total		116,932	100.00	24	0
Valid votes		116,932	95.71		
Invalid/blank votes		5,238	4.29		
Total votes		122,170	100.00		
Registered voters/turnout		152,114	80.31		
Source: Almanak Keputusan Pilihan Raya Umum: Parlimen & Dewan Undangan Negeri (1959-1999)

Negri Sembilan Total Valid Votes should be 116572, Total Votes as 121810 with a turnout rate of 80.1%

=== Pahang ===
Party or alliance		Votes	%	Seats	+/–
Alliance Party	United Malays National Organisation	52,461	52.59	17	0
Alliance Party	Malaysian Chinese Association	15,791	15.83	7	+1
Alliance Party	Total	68,252	68.41	24	+1
Malayan Peoples'; Socialist Front	Labour Party of Malaya	11,440	11.47	0	0
Malayan Peoples'; Socialist Front	Parti Ra'ayat	7,088	7.10	0	0
Malayan Peoples'; Socialist Front	Total	18,528	18.57	0	0
Pan-Malayan Islamic Party		8,525	8.55	0	0
United Democratic Party		593	0.59	0	New
Independents		3,864	3.87	0	-1
Total		99,762	100.00	24	0
Valid votes		99,762	93.85		
Invalid/blank votes		6,539	6.15		
Total votes		106,301	100.00		
Registered voters/turnout		136,322	77.98		
Source: Almanak Keputusan Pilihan Raya Umum: Parlimen & Dewan Undangan Negeri (1959-1999)

Registered voters above refer to total voters of contested seats. Total electors for Pahang is 141592 which includes uncontested DUN constituency of Tanah Puteh.

=== Penang ===
Party or alliance		Votes	%	Seats	+/–
Alliance Party	United Malays National Organisation	47,976	23.38	10	0
Alliance Party	Malaysian Chinese Association	40,344	19.66	6	0
Alliance Party	Malaysian Indian Congress	8,494	4.14	2	+1
Alliance Party	Total	96,814	47.18	18	+1
Malayan Peoples'; Socialist Front	Labour Party of Malaya	46,546	22.69	2	–5
Malayan Peoples'; Socialist Front	Parti Ra'ayat	19,365	9.44	0	0
Malayan Peoples'; Socialist Front	Total	65,911	32.12	2	–5
United Democratic Party		35,971	17.53	4	New
Pan-Malayan Islamic Party		4,305	2.10	0	0
People's Action Party		1,059	0.52	0	New
People's Progressive Party		670	0.33	0	0
Independents		453	0.22	0	0
Total		205,183	100.00	24	0
Valid votes		205,183	96.96		
Invalid/blank votes		6,437	3.04		
Total votes		211,620	100.00		
Registered voters/turnout		253,455	83.49		
Source: Almanak Keputusan Pilihan Raya Umum: Parlimen & Dewan Undangan Negeri (1959-1999)

=== Perak ===
Party or alliance		Votes	%	Seats	+/–
Alliance Party	United Malays National Organisation	122,479	30.88	22	+1
Alliance Party	Malaysian Chinese Association	85,926	21.66	12	+3
Alliance Party	Malaysian Indian Congress	8,283	2.09	1	0
Alliance Party	Total	216,688	54.63	35	+4
People's Progressive Party		82,273	20.74	5	–3
Pan-Malayan Islamic Party		45,107	11.37	0	–1
Malayan Peoples' Socialist Front	Parti Ra'ayat	20,769	5.24	0	0
Malayan Peoples' Socialist Front	Labour Party of Malaya	8,276	2.09	0	New
Malayan Peoples' Socialist Front	Total	29,045	7.32	0	0
United Democratic Party		18,321	4.62	0	New
Independents		5,218	1.32	0	0
Total		396,652	100.00	40	0
Valid votes		396,652	95.13		
Invalid/blank votes		20,299	4.87		
Total votes		416,951	100.00		
Registered voters/turnout		524,487	79.50		
Source: Almanak Keputusan Pilihan Raya Umum: Parlimen & Dewan Undangan Negeri (1959-1999)

=== Perlis ===
Party or alliance		Votes	%	Seats	+/–
Alliance Party	United Malays National Organisation	17,524	48.72	9	–1
Alliance Party	Malaysian Chinese Association	4,381	12.18	2	0
Alliance Party	Total	21,905	60.90	11	–1
Pan-Malayan Islamic Party		13,354	37.13	1	+1
Malayan Peoples' Socialist Front	Parti Ra'ayat	547	1.52	0	0
Independents		164	0.46	0	0
Total		35,970	100.00	12	0
Valid votes		35,970	94.62		
Invalid/blank votes		2,044	5.38		
Total votes		38,014	100.00		
Registered voters/turnout		46,491	81.77		
Source: Almanak Keputusan Pilihan Raya Umum: Parlimen & Dewan Undangan Negeri (1959-1999)

=== Selangor ===
Party or alliance		Votes	%	Seats	+/–
Alliance Party	United Malays National Organisation	69,593	26.76	13	–1
Alliance Party	Malaysian Chinese Association	63,178	24.30	8	0
Alliance Party	Malaysian Indian Congress	15,482	5.95	3	+2
Alliance Party	Total	148,253	57.02	24	+1
Malayan Peoples'; Socialist Front	Labour Party of Malaya	60,061	23.10	3	+2
Malayan Peoples'; Socialist Front	Parti Ra'ayat	20,190	7.76	1	–1
Malayan Peoples'; Socialist Front	Parti Perhimpunan Kebangsaan	990	0.38	0	New
Malayan Peoples'; Socialist Front	Total	90,241	34.71	4	+1
People's Action Party		13,743	5.29	0	New
Pan-Malayan Islamic Party		9,344	3.59	0	0
People's Progressive Party		7,239	2.78	0	0
Independents		195	0.07	0	–2
Total		260,015	100.00	28	0
Valid votes		260,015	94.37		
Invalid/blank votes		15,502	5.63		
Total votes		275,517	100.00		
Registered voters/turnout		388,211	70.97		
Source: Almanak Keputusan Pilihan Raya Umum: Parlimen & Dewan Undangan Negeri (1959-1999)

Selangor valid votes should be 269015, total votes should be 284517 and turnout rate of 73.3%

=== Trengganu ===
Party or alliance		Votes	%	Seats	+/–
Alliance Party	United Malays National Organisation	56,248	52.71	20	+15
Alliance Party	Malaysian Chinese Association	2,703	2.53	1	–1
Alliance Party	Total	58,951	55.25	21	+14
Pan-Malayan Islamic Party		34,922	32.73	3	–10
Parti Negara		8,040	7.53	0	-4
Malayan Peoples' Socialist Front	Parti Ra'ayat	3,965	3.72	0	0
Independents		828	0.78	0	0
Total		106,706	100.00	24	0
Valid votes		106,706	94.91		
Invalid/blank votes		5,717	5.09		
Total votes		112,423	100.00		
Registered voters/turnout		145,217	77.42		
Source: Almanak Keputusan Pilihan Raya Umum: Parlimen & Dewan Undangan Negeri (1959-1999)
