= Parti Perhimpunan Kebangsaan =

Former party formed by Aziz Ishak

- Abbreviation: NCP
- Chairman: Aziz Ishak
- Founder: Aziz Ishak
- Founded: 15 July 1963
- Dissolved: 6 February 1966
- Split from: United Malays National Organisation (UMNO)
- Headquarters: Kajang, Malaysia
- Ideology: Green politics
- Political position: Centre-left
- National affiliation: Socialist Front (1964–1966)
- Colours: Green

The National Convention Party (Malay: Parti Perhimpunan Malaysia) was a party formed by Aziz Ishak, former Minister for Agriculture and Co-operatives, with backing from farmers and fisherman.

== History ==
The party was formed by Aziz Ishak on 15 July 1963 at Hotel Majestic (Kuala Lumpur). It main objective were to organize so-called "Malay-left", composed of the poorest peasants, the most insecure fisherman, and other discontented rural dwellers as part of a centre coalition to oppose the Alliance. It were formed after he resigned from the Cabinet and expelled from UMNO and Alliance. In 1964, the party joined the Malayan Peoples' Socialist Front.

In 1963, shortly after the events of the Indonesia-Malaysia confrontation, the government has taken action against several opposition politicians and activists. SF was seen as pro-Indonesia and pro-China, causing the Socialist Front leader was arrested. Among those detained and arrested was Ahmad Boestamam (PR president), Ishak Haji Muhammad (PBM president), Abdul Aziz Ishak (Gerakan Angkatan Melayu Sedar president) and Datuk Kampo Radjo (later to become president of the PRM), Tan Kai Hee, Tan Hock Hin, Dr. Rajakumar, Hasnul Hadi, Tajuddin Kahar and hundreds of others. Rallies and mass demonstrations were held on February 13, 1965 in Kuala Lumpur in conjunction with the second anniversary of the detention of Ahmad Boestamam and others to oppose the mass arrests of activists and leaders of the SF under the Internal Security Act and the alleged involvement activities "subversion".

== List of party leaders ==
Chairmen

#	Name	Took office	Left office
1	Aziz Ishak	15 July 1963	13 February 1965

Deputy Chairmen

#	Name	Took office	Left office
1	Kampo Radjo	15 July 1963	13 February 1965

== General election results ==
Election	Total seats won	Seats contested	Total votes	Voting Percentage	Outcome of election	Election leader
1964	0 / 159	3	15,307	0.74%	; No representation in Parliament (Socialist Front)	Aziz Ishak

=== State election ===
State election	State Legislative Assembly	
State election	Selangor	Total won / Total contested
1964	0 / 28	0 / 4
