= Syed Hussein Alatas =

Malaysian academic, sociologist and politician

Yang Berbahagia Dato' Syed Hussein Alatas DSPN
- سيد حسين العطاس

4th Vice-Chancellor of University of Malaya
- In office May 1988 – January 1991
- Preceded by: Ungku Abdul Aziz
- Succeeded by: Mohd Taib Osman

1st President of the Parti Gerakan Rakyat Malaysia
- In office 1968–1971
- Preceded by: Position established
- Succeeded by: Lim Chong Eu

Personal details
- Born: Syed Hussein Alatas bin Syed Ali Alatas; 17 September 1928 Buitenzorg, West Java, Dutch East Indies (now Bogor, Indonesia)
- Died: 23 January 2007 (aged 78) Bukit Damansara, Kuala Lumpur, Malaysia
- Resting place: Bukit Kiara Muslim Cemetery, Kuala Lumpur, Malaysia
- Party: Gerakan (1968–1973); PEKEMAS (1973–1978); Berjasa (1982–1983); Independent (1983–2007)
- Spouse: Zaharah Abdullah
- Children: 3
- Education: University of Amsterdam

Syed Hussein Alatas bin Syed Ali Alatas (Arabic: سيد حسین العطاس Sayyid Ḥusayn al-ʿAṭṭās; 17 September 1928 – 23 January 2007) was a Malaysian academic, sociologist, politician, and founder of social science organisations. He was Vice-Chancellor of the University of Malaya in the 1980s and formed the Parti Gerakan Rakyat Malaysia (Gerakan). Syed Hussein wrote several books on corruption, multi-racialism, imperialism, and intellectual captivity as part of the colonial, and postcolonial, project, the most famous being The Myth of the Lazy Native.

== Early life ==
Syed was born in Buitenzorg (now Bogor), Dutch East Indies (now Indonesia). His grandfather, Sayyid 'Abd Allah bin Muhsin al-Attas (Arabic: سيد عبد الله بن محسن العطاس Sayyid 'Abd Allāh bin Muḥsin al-ʿAṭṭās), was a Hadhrami from Hadhramaut, Yemen and settled in Bogor. Syed Hussein is the older brother of Syed Muhammad Naquib al-Attas and the father of Syed Farid Alatas, a professor at the National University of Singapore, Sharifah Munirah Alatas, a professor at the National University of Malaysia, and Sharifah Masturah Alatas, author of his first biography.

== Political career ==
Syed Hussein was among several intellectuals who formed Gerakan in 1968 as an offshoot of the defunct Labour Party. Gerakan was successful in the 1969 general election, where it campaigned on a platform of social justice and the reduction or elimination of Bumiputra privileges outlined by Article 153 of the Constitution. Gerakan held a victory rally in the capital of Kuala Lumpur to celebrate. However, it deviated from its planned route into Malay areas of the city, where party members jeered at the Malays.

Although an apology was issued the following day, the United Malays National Organisation (UMNO), a major component of the ruling Alliance coalition government, held a retaliatory rally. This rally degenerated into a riot with at least 180 people killed (other estimates put the death toll substantially higher). As a result, a state of emergency was declared, and Parliament was suspended; it did not reconvene until 1971.

Syed Hussein briefly served in the Dewan Negara at this point, but when Gerakan joined the Alliance coalition government in 1972, he left the party to help form PEKEMAS (Parti Keadilan Masyarakat Malaysia, or Social Justice Party of Malaysia) along with Gerakan MPs Dr Tan Chee Khoon, V. David, and Veerappen Veerathan. The new party was based on similar principles that Gerakan had been formed on, but did poorly in the 1974 elections and collapsed in 1978 due to massive defections to the Democratic Action Party (DAP).

In 1982 he joined Berjasa as a supreme council member, but left the party the following year.

== Academic and public career ==
Syed Hussein's academic career began at the Dewan Bahasa dan Pustaka publishing house, where he worked as head of the research department from 1958 onwards. He began lecturing part-time in philosophy at the University of Malaya in 1960 and served as the Head of the Cultural Division at the University's Department of Malay Studies from 1963 to 1967. He served as the Head of the Department of Malay Studies in the National University of Singapore from 1967 to 1988. He was appointed as the Vice-Chancellor of the University of Malaya in 1988, before becoming a professor at the Centre for General Studies in the Universiti Kebangsaan Malaysia in 1995. He later transferred to the Department of Anthropology and Sociology in 1997, before becoming a principal research fellow at the Institute of the Malay World and Civilisation of the same university in 1999.

Syed Hussein authored a number of books, the most well-known being The Myth of the Lazy Native. In 1966, Syed Hussein began pondering the question of why Western colonialists had, for four centuries, considered the natives of Maritime Southeast Asia to be generally lazy since Europeans had not arrived until the 17th century. His research eventually produced The Myth of the Lazy Native, a book which was published in 1977. In the book, he cited one instance of a "denigrating" view of the natives, when a German scientist suggested that the Filipinos made their oars from bamboo so they could rest more frequently: "If they happen to break, so much the better, for the fatiguing labor of rowing must necessarily be suspended till they are mended again." Syed Hussein criticised such beliefs in the book as ranging "from vulgar fantasy and untruth to refined scholarship", very much an ideological justification of colonial domination. He also asserted that "[t]he image of the indolent, dull, backward and treacherous native has changed into that of a dependent one requiring assistance to climb the ladder of progress", especially with publications like the 1971 Revolusi Mental (Mental Revolution) by UMNO that succumbed to the language of colonial capitalism.

According to Bruno Fernandes, Alatas was a "sociologist, philosopher, academic and policy analyst" who "worked out a critical and reflexive work from the point of view of the ex-colonized countries", and while Alatas was and is today well "known in the Malayan intellectual world (Indonesia, Malaysia, Singapore, Philippines) – and (by) a "broad Malayan intellectual (Indonesia, Malaysia, Singapore, Philippines) community", he is "broadly ignored elsewhere…." The respect for Syed Alatas and his influence is also discussed in "An Intellectual Life" in Asian Analysis by Asean Focus Group and Faculty of Asian Studies at The Australian National University: "The late Edward Wadie Said, for example, whose book Orientalism recast post-colonial scholarship, acknowledged his debt to Syed Hussein whose critique of imperialism in his Myth of the Lazy Native (1977) and of colonial historiography in Thomas Stamford Raffles: Schemer or Reformer (1971) were pioneering efforts in Third-Worldist post-colonial responses to Western social sciences. He has been regarded as one of the founders of sociological investigation in Southeast Asia and as a mentor to many in the Malaysian Social Science and academic community, more generally. In the 1950s, he was already considering the significance of the contribution of Tunisian-born Ibn Khaldun (1332–1406) to the philosophy of history and sociology. While undertaking postgraduate studies at the University of Amsterdam, Syed Hussein founded and edited the journal Progressive Islam (1954–55), fostering his links with intellectuals within the Muslim world, including Mohammad Natsir from Indonesia, Taha Husayn and Osman Amin, both from Egypt."

Citing Syed Alatas as an opponent of corruption another writer wrote, "Syed Hussein's pet domains had been Malay studies, progressive Islam and fighting corruption. Read his books if you have the time: The Democracy of Islam, Mental Revolution, Sociology of Corruption, and The Myth of the Lazy Native, among many more."; as a supporter for multiracism, "To the young, you should be reminded that Syed Hussein laid the foundation for multi-racial politics, obviously ahead of his time....."; as an academic, Syed Hussein is remembered as a man with a sense of fairness and integrity. However, Dr. Lim Teck Ghee, who was a lecturer at Universiti Malaya when the Prof was VC, said: "His insistence on the principles of excellence, justice and fair play irrespective of a race made him unpopular in some circles. For this, he paid a heavy price.”

== Death ==
Syed Hussein died from a heart attack at 9.30 p.m. of 23 January 2007.

== Bibliography ==
- Reflections on the Theories of Religion (1963)
- The Sociology of Corruption (1968)
- Thomas Stamford Raffles: Schemer or Reformer? (1972)
- Modernization and Social Change in Southeast Asia (1972)
- Intellectuals in Developing Societies (1977)
- The Myth of the Lazy Native: A Study of the Image of the Malays, Filipinos and Javanese from the 16th to the 20th Century and Its Function in the Ideology of Colonial Capitalism (1977)
- The Problem of Corruption (1986)
- Corruption: Its Nature, Causes and Functions (1990)
- "Corruption" in Oxford Companion to Politics of the World OUP New York (1993)
- "Social Sciences" in The Oxford Encyclopedia of the Modern Islamic World Vol 4 OUP New York (1995)
- Corruption and the Destiny of Asia (1999)
- Cita Sempurna Warisan Sejarah (2000)

== Notes and references ==
Political offices
Preceded by Party newly found	President of Parti Gerakan Rakyat Malaysia (Gerakan); 1968–1969	Succeeded by Lim Chong Eu
