= Syed Farid Alatas =

Malaysian sociologist

Syed Farid Alatas bin Syed Hussein Alatas
- Born: 1961 (age 64–65); Haarlem, the Netherlands
- Citizenship: Malaysian
- Known for: Research on the East-West dichotomy, decolonization of knowledge, Islamisation of knowledge and Muslim intellectualism
- Scientific career
- Fields: Sociology
- Workplaces: National University of Singapore

Syed Farid Alatas (Arabic: سيد فريد العطاس, romanized: Sayyid Farīd al-ʿAṭṭās) is a Malaysian author and educator, serving as a professor in the Department of Sociology at the National University of Singapore. He is the eldest son of Syed Hussein Alatas.

He was a member of the Editorial Board for Journal of World-Systems Research.

== Early life and education ==
Syed Farid Alatas was born in 1961 in Haarlem, the Netherlands, the eldest son of Syed Hussein Alatas and Sarojini Zaharah Alatas, when Hussein was in the country to complete his doctoral studies. Sarojini was a broadcaster on Radio Televisyen Malaysia before their marriage.

Farid holds a Bachelor’s degree in economics from the University of Oregon (1984) as well as a Master’s degree in sociology from Johns Hopkins University (1988). He also completed his PhD in sociology at Johns Hopkins University in 1991.

== Career ==
In 1992, Farid was employed by the National University of Singapore (NUS). Prior to that, he lectured at the University of Malaya in Kuala Lumpur, Malaysia, from 1990 to 1992.

== Books ==
- Ibn Khaldun (Makers of Islamic Civilization), Delhi: Oxford University Press, 2013
- Applying Ibn Khaldun: The Recovery of a Lost Tradition in Sociology (Routledge), 2014
- An Islamic Perspective on the Commitment to Inter-Religious Dialogue, Institute of Advanced Islamic Studies Malaysia, 2008
- Alternative Discourses in Asian Social Science: Responses to Eurocentrism, Delhi: Sage, 2006
- Democracy and Authoritarianism in Indonesia and Malaysia: The Rise of the Post-Colonial State, (Macmillan, 1997)
- The post-colonial state: Dual functions in the public sphere (Department of Sociology working papers), National University of Singapore, 1994
- Asian Inter-Faith Dialogue: Perspectives on Religion, Education and Social Cohesion (edited) (Centre for Research on Islamic and Malay Affairs, 2003)
- Asian Anthropology, edited with Jan van Bremen and Eyal Ben-Ari (Routledge, 2005)
