= Labour Party of Malaya =

Labour Party of Malaya Parti Buruh Malaya
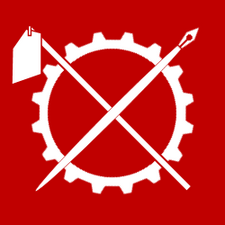
- Abbreviation: Lab, LPM
- Founded: June 1952
- Dissolved: 6 September 1972
- Preceded by: Pan-Malayan Labour Party
- Youth wing: Socialist Youth League of Malaya
- Ideology: Democratic socialism
- Political position: Left-wing
- National affiliation: Malayan Peoples' Socialist Front (1957–66); United Front (1966)
- International affiliation: Socialist International (1952–1966); Asian Socialist Conference
- Colours: Red, white

The Labour Party of Malaya (Malay: Parti Buruh Malaya; abbrev. LPM) was a left-wing political party in the Federation of Malaya and later Malaysia, active from 1952 to 1972. It originated as a confederation of state-based labour parties under the name Pan-Malayan Labour Party (PMLP). As a component of the Malayan Peoples' Socialist Front, the party reached its electoral peak in 1959, but its influence rapidly declined after most of its leadership was detained for political reasons.

== History ==
=== Origins ===
The LPM's roots lay in the state labour parties that were established after the British government announced plans to organise local elections in 1950.

In 1952, representatives from the state parties, 21 trade unions and the Malay left-leaning organisation Syarikat Berkerjasama Am Saiburi (Saberkas) met in Kuala Lumpur and decided to form the PMLP. This organisation initially took an anti-communist stand but was not overtly anti-colonial.

The LPM's founding constitution demanded immediate self-government for Malaya, liberal citizenship laws, the Malayanization of the civil service, a planned economy, greater democratic justice and agrarian reform. The LPM also proposed for the abolishment of special privileges for any ethnic group, federal nationality to supersede state nationality, the use of Malay as the national language and English as a second language, the merger of Singapore with the Federation of Malaya, the limiting the powers of the Malay rulers, an elected presidency, and a secular state.

The party joined the Socialist International of like-minded left-wing parties in 1956.

The party chairman Lee Moke Sang was forced to resign as public servants were barred from political office. D.S. Ramanathan became the new chairman. With the rise of more radical socialist leadership, the positions gradually took a more anti-colonial form and in June 1954, the organisation was renamed the LPM.

=== Development ===
The LPM was routed in the Federal legislative elections of 1955 and failed to gain any seats. The LPM, however, managed to capture the City Council of Georgetown in Penang in the 1958 local elections with a majority of eight seats.

The party identified itself as a non-communal party. It considered that the Alliance government represented capitalist and feudal groups.

In view of the changed circumstances after the independence of Malaya in 1957, the LPM amended its constitution in 1959 to strive for the establishment of a united democratic socialist state of Malaya and to secure for the workers who work by hand or by brain the full fruits of their industry and the most equitable distribution thereof that may be possible, upon the basis of the common ownership of the means of production, distribution and exchange, and the best obtainable system of popular administration and control of each industry or service (the latter part essentially mirroring the then Clause IV of the British Labour Party's constitution).

The party had a youth wing called the Socialist Youth League of Malaya.

=== Socialist Front ===
The Labour Party entered into a coalition with the similarly left wing Parti Rakyat Malaysia. The coalition was called the Malayan Peoples' Socialist Front. In the 1959 elections the Socialist Front captured 8 parliamentary seats.

Six were won by the Labour Party, which were Dato' Kramat (Lim Kean Siew), Seberang Selatan (Veerappen Veerathan), Tanjong (Tan Phock Kin), Bangsar (V. David), Batu (Ng Ann Teck) and Rawang (Liu Yoong Peng).

Two more were won by Parti Rakyat in Setapak (Ahmad Boestamam) and Damansara (Karam Singh Veriah).

The SF progressed particularly in mixed constituencies in Selangor, Johor and Penang where it gained 34.6 per cent of the popular vote cast in the constituencies it contested.

Led by the Labour Party, the Socialist Front managed to gain 13 out of 14 seats in George Town, Penang during the 1961 Local Elections. In Melaka, PRM's Hasnul Abdul Hadi led the Socialist Front to take over the municipal council there.

The SF was further strengthened when the former Minister of Agriculture, Aziz Ishak, brought his National Convention Party into the coalition.

=== Persecution and demise ===
In 1963, shortly after the events of the Indonesia-Malaysia confrontation, the government took action against numerous Socialist Front politicians and activists.

The SF was seen as pro-Indonesia and pro-China, causing the Socialist Front leader's arrest. Among those detained and arrested were Ahmad Boestamam (PRM president), Ishak Haji Muhammad (PBM president), NCP leaders Abdul Aziz Ishak and Datuk Kampo Radjo (later to become president of the PRM) and PRM's Kamarulzaman Teh.

In the 1964 General Elections, the Socialist Front lost 6 seats and managed to retain only two seats through Lim Kean Siew and Tan Chee Khoon. PRM and the NCP failed to gain any seats at all.

On Feb 13, 1965, more SF leaders such as Tan Kai Hee, Tan Phock Kin, Dr. M.K. Rajakumar, Hasnul Abdul Hadi and Tajuddin Kahar, and hundreds of others were detained after mass demonstrations were held in Kuala Lumpur in conjunction with the second anniversary of the detention of Ahmad Boestamam and others to oppose the mass arrests of activists and leaders of the SF under the Internal Security Act (ISA) and the alleged involvement in "subversive" activities.

Aside from the detentions, the SF also suffered from the cancellation of local government elections. Disputes between the two parties resulted in PRM leaving the coalition in December 1965, while the NCP soon become inactive.

The Labour Party, the only party in SF that held seats, abandoned it on 10 January 1966 and reverted to its own banner. In May 1966, the Labour Party was expelled from the Socialist International on the grounds of its increased radicalisation.

In 1968, many Labour Party leaders left the party to team up with Lim Chong Eu's United Democratic Party to form Gerakan. The party eventually wound down and dissolved in 1972.

== General elections result ==
Election	Total seats won	Seats contested	Total votes	Share of votes	Outcome of election	Election leader
1955	0 / 52	4	4,786	0.48%	; No representation in Legislative Council	D. S. Ramanathan
1959	6 / 104	25	146,608	9.48%	▲6 seats; Opposition coalition (Socialist Front)	Ishak Mohammad
1964	2 / 159	34	212,546	10.33%	▼4 seats; Opposition coalition (Socialist Front)	Tan Chee Khoon

== State election result ==
State election	State Legislative Assembly									
State election	Kedah	Kelantan	Penang	Perak	Pahang	Selangor	Negeri Sembilan	Malacca	Johor	Total won / Total contested
2/3 majority	2 / 3	2 / 3	2 / 3	2 / 3	2 / 3	2 / 3	2 / 3	2 / 3	2 / 3	
1955			0 / 14			0 / 13	0 / 12			0 / 3
1959	0 / 24	0 / 30	7 / 24	0 / 40	0 / 24	1 / 28	3 / 24	0 / 20	3 / 32	14 / 48
1964	0 / 24		2 / 24	0 / 40	0 / 24	3 / 28	0 / 24	2 / 20	0 / 32	7 / 89
