= Kampo Radjo =

Malaysian politician (1922–1988)

Yang Berbahagia Datuk Kampo Radjo

Member of the Selangor State Executive Council
- In office 19 August 1959 – 19 March 1963 (Agriculture)
- Monarch: Salahuddin
- Menteri Besar: Abu Bakar Baginda
- Preceded by: position created

Member of the Selangor State Legislative Assembly for Semenyih
- In office 19 August 1959 – 25 April 1964
- Preceded by: constituency created
- Succeeded by: Zainuddin Mohd Sidin
- Majority: 2,943 (1959)

President of Parti Sosialis Rakyat Malaysia
- In office 1985 – 11 August 1988
- Preceded by: Kassim Ahmad
- Succeeded by: Syed Husin Ali

Deputy Chairmen of Parti Perhimpunan Kebangsaan
- In office 15 July 1963 – 13 February 1965
- Preceded by: position created
- Succeeded by: position abolished

Personal details
- Born: Nafias bin Rasul; January 1, 1922 Sumatera Barat, Indonesia
- Died: August 11, 1988
- Party: United Malays National Organisation (UMNO) (1947-1963); Parti Perhimpunan Kebangsaan (NCP) (1963-1965); Parti Sosialis Rakyat Malaysia (PSRM) (1968-1988)

Datuk Kampo Radjo or Nafias bin Rasul (1922–1988) was an Indonesian-born political activist who moved to Malaya in the 1940s and became a prominent political leader there.

A former Selangor state executive council member for Agriculture, he quit ruling party Umno alongside federal minister Aziz Ishak and was later a political detainee for over three years.

After his release, he became the leader of the left-wing Parti Sosialis Rakyat Malaysia for eight years until his death

== Early life ==
He was born in 1922 in Kampung Batagak, West Sumatra, Indonesia. His name was Nafias bin Rasul but he took on the title of Datuk Kampo Radjo, a traditional title in Minangkabau society.

He gained political awareness after receiving a religious education and joined the Sarekat Islam political movement which was actively agitating for Indonesian independence from the Dutch. When he was 16 years old, he became the head of the Indonesian Muslim Youth Branch in Bukittinggi, Sumatra.

Moving to Java, he became closely acquainted with Indonesian independence agitators Abikusno Tjokrosujoso and Arudji Kartawinata. As a result, he was arrested by the Dutch colonists for being active in Sarekat Islam.

== Political career ==
After World War II, Kampo Radjo migrated to Kuala Lumpur in 1947, he joined the United Malays National Organization (UMNO) as an ordinary member and later became treasurer of the Umno Hulu Langat division.

In the first election after Malaya's independence, he contested the Semenyih state seat. He bagged 3,734 votes (73 percent) to secure a comfortable victory over rival candidates Dagang Silin of Parti Negara and Yunus Yatim of PAS.

Selangor Menteri Besar Abu Bakar Baginda appointed him to serve as Agricultural Exco of the Selangor State Government in 1959.

However, the Confrontation with Indonesia resulted in the targeting of political leaders deemed sympathetic to the Sukarno regime.

For Kampo Radjo a flash point occurred on December 4, 1962 during a vote for Selangor Assembly speaker when Alliance representatives revolted against the party's choice. On March 19, 1963 he declared that he would leave Umno as he could no longer work with the party.

When left-leaning Umno minister Aziz Ishak left the party to form the short-lived National Convention Party in 1963, Kampo Radjo became that party's deputy chairman.

The NCP joined the left-wing Malayan Peoples' Socialist Front together with the Labour Party of Malaya and Partai Ra'ayat to contest the 1964 general elections. Kampo Radjo was elected as Treasurer of the Socialist Front but the coalition was soundly defeated. He himself lost in the Kuala Selangor MP race to Alliance candidate Raja Rome Raja Ma'amor who won by 11,684 votes to 4,435 in a straight fight.

On Jan 26, 1965, Kampo Radjo was detained under the Internal Security Act (ISA) along with many other Socialist Front leaders like Aziz Ishak, Pak Sako and Hasnul Abdul Hadi.

He was detained without trial for three and a half years, being released on May 31, 1968.

After his release, Kampo Radjo joined PSRM and contested the Malacca Tengah parliamentary seat in the 1969 elections. He lost to the MCA president Tan Siew Sin who garnered 13,790 votes while Kampo Radjo won 6,490 votes and PAS candidate Mohamed Kamal Sudin came in third with 6,161 votes.

In 1970, he was named to the National Consultative Council (Mapen) which was formed in the aftermath of the May 13 racial riots. However, in keeping with his party's stand, he withdrew from participation in the council.

According to his PSRM party colleague Dr Syed Husin Ali, Kampo Radjo was a very good orator who was eloquent but not fiery.

Despite being a former exco, he also went everywhere by motorcycle and worked very hard for PSRM in the 1974 elections. In that election, he ran for the Dungun parliamentary constituency, losing heavily by 7,501 votes to PAS incumbent Abdul Wahab Yunus who was contesting on a Barisan Nasional ticket.

When party leaders like Kassim Ahmad and Syed Husin were detained in the mid-1970s, Kampo Radjo became PSRM acting president. He contested the Kajang state seat in 1978, losing badly in a four-way contest won by DAP's Liew Ah Kim.

He eventually served as PSRM president from 1985 until his death on August 11, 1988.

== Election results ==
Selangor State Legislative Assembly
| Year | Constituency | Candidate | Votes | Pct | Opponent(s) | Votes | Pct | Ballots cast | Majority | Turnout |
|---|---|---|---|---|---|---|---|---|---|---|
| 1959 | Semenyih | Kampo Radjo (UMNO) | 3,734 | 72.97% | Dagang Silin (Parti Negara) | 791 | 15.46% | 5,117 | 2,943 | 60.94% |
| 1959 | Semenyih | Kampo Radjo (UMNO) | 3,734 | 72.97% | Yunus Yatim (PMIP) | 592 | 11.57% | 5,117 | 2,943 | 60.94% |
| 1978 | Kajang | Kampo Radjo (PSRM) | 550 | 4.58% | Liew Ah Kim (DAP) | 6,841 | 56.95% | 12,012 | 2,528 | 78.78% |
| 1978 | Kajang | Kampo Radjo (PSRM) | 550 | 4.58% | Kan Tong Fong (MCA) | 4,313 | 35.91% | 12,012 | 2,528 | 78.78% |
| 1978 | Kajang | Kampo Radjo (PSRM) | 550 | 4.58% | Aman Khan (PEKEMAS) | 308 | 2.56% | 12,012 | 2,528 | 78.78% |

Parliament of Malaysia
| Year | Constituency | Candidate | Votes | Pct | Opponent(s) | Votes | Pct | Ballots cast | Majority | Turnout |
|---|---|---|---|---|---|---|---|---|---|---|
| 1964 | P065 Kuala Selangor, Selangor | Kampo Radjo (SF) | 4,435 | 27.51% | Raja Rome Raja Ma'amor (UMNO) | 11,684 | 72.49% | 16,119 | 7,249 | 70.14% |
| 1969 | P085 Malacca Tengah, Melaka | Kampo Radjo (PSRM) | 6,490 | 24.55% | Tan Siew Sin (MCA) | 13,790 | 52.15% | 26,441 | 7,300 | 78.79% |
| 1969 | P085 Malacca Tengah, Melaka | Kampo Radjo (PSRM) | 6,490 | 24.55% | Mohamed Kamal Sudin (PMIP) | 6,161 | 23.30% | 26,441 | 7,300 | 78.79% |
| 1974 | P033 Dungun, Terengganu | Kampo Radjo (PSRM) | 4,314 | 26.75% | Abdul Wahab Yunus (PAS) | 11,815 | 73.25% | 16,129 | 7,501 | 70.92% |
