= Malayan Peoples' Socialist Front =

Malayan Peoples' Socialist Front Barisan Sosialis Rakyat Malaya
- Abbreviation: SF
- Founder: Ahmad Boestamam
- Founded: 31 August 1957
- Legalised: 29 July 1958
- Dissolved: 10 January 1966
- Succeeded by: United Front (1966–1969/70)
- Headquarters: Kuala Lumpur
- Membership: Parti Rakyat Malaysia; Labour Party of Malaya; National Convention Party
- Ideology: Democratic socialism Left-wing nationalism
- Political position: Left-wing
- Colours: Red

The Malayan Peoples' Socialist Front (Malay: Barisan Sosialis Rakyat Malaya) or better known as Socialist Front (SF) or Barisan Sosialis (BS) was a left-wing coalition of Malaysian socialist parties. It was among the longest-standing opposition coalitions in Malaysian general election history. The coalition was formed by Parti Rakyat Malaya (PRM) and the Labour Party of Malaya on Hari Merdeka in 1957. In 1964, the National Convention Party (NCP) joined the coalition. PRM left the coalition in 1965 and NCP soon become inactive. The Labour Party, the only remaining party in SF, abandoned it on 10 January 1966 and reverted to its own banner.

== History ==
The coalition was formed on Hari Merdeka by two multi-racial parties – the Partai Rakyat (PRM) which had a Malay leftist leadership and the Labour Party of Malaya, which was largely supported by Malaya's Chinese minority. The first chairman was Ahmad Boestamam, the PRM president.

In the 1959 General Elections, the Socialist Front (SF) managed to gain 8 seats in Selangor, Johor, and Penang constituencies. It won 34.6% of the popular vote cast in the constituencies.

Six seats were won by the Labour Party, which were Dato' Kramat (Lim Kean Siew), Seberang Selatan (Veerappen Veerathan), Tanjong (Tan Phock Kin), Bangsar (V. David), Batu (Ng Ann Teck) and Rawang (Liu Yoong Peng).

Two more were won by Parti Rakyat in Setapak (Ahmad Boestamam) and Damansara (Karam Singh Veriah).

The SF successfully garnered 13% of the votes, thus becoming the third-largest party in Parliament after the Alliance and the Pan Malayan Islamic Party (PMIP).

The Socialist Front managed to gain 13 out of 14 seats in George Town, Penang during the 1961 Local Elections. The SF was further strengthened when the former Minister of Agriculture, Aziz Ishak, brought his National Convention Party into the coalition. Ahmad Boestamam resigned as SF chairman in 1961 to concentrate on leading PRM.

In 1963, shortly after the events of the Indonesia-Malaysia confrontation, the government took action against several opposition politicians and activists. SF was seen as pro-Indonesia and pro-China, causing the Socialist Front leader's arrest. Among those detained and arrested were Ahmad Boestamam (PRM president), Ishak Haji Muhammad (PBM president), Abdul Aziz Ishak (NCP president) and Datuk Kampo Radjo (later to become president of the PRM), Tan Kai Hee, Tan Phock Kin, Dr. M.K. Rajakumar, Hasnul Abdul Hadi, Tajuddin Kahar, Kamarulzaman Teh and hundreds of others. Rallies and mass demonstrations were held on 13 February 1965 in Kuala Lumpur in conjunction with the second anniversary of the detention of Ahmad Boestamam and others to oppose the mass arrests of activists and leaders of the SF under the Internal Security Act (ISA) and the alleged involvement in "subversive" activities.

In the 1964 General Elections, the Socialist Front lost 6 seats and managed to retain 2 seats. PRM and the NCP failed to gain any seats at all while the Labour Party lost a significant number of seats. Cancellation of local government elections in 1965 after the declaration of Emergency in 1964 because of continued confrontation with Indonesia, weakened the impact of SF. Dispute between the two parties resulted in PRM leaving the coalition in December 1965, and NCP soon become inactive. The Labour Party, the only party in SF that held seats, abandoned it on 10 January 1966 and reverted to its own banner.

== Aftermath ==
In 1968, most of the Labour Party members linked up with UDP members to form Gerakan. Labour Party boycotted the 1969 elections and organised demonstrations against the detention of its leaders by the government.

After the elections, the Labour Party continued in the face of tough action by the government and was finally wound up on 6 September 1972. PRM changed its name to Parti Sosialis Rakyat Malaysia (PSRM) in 1970 and again in 1989 (Parti Rakyat Malaysia-PRM).

Ahmad Boestamam and Ishak Haji Muhammad established Parti Marhaen Malaysia (PMM) in 1968. PMM then merged with Parti Keadilan Masyarakat Malaysia (PEKEMAS) in 1974. He tried to resurrect the coalition before the 1974 elections, but failed.

== Component parties ==
- Parti Rakyat Malaysia
- Parti Buruh Malaya
- National Convention Party

== List of leaders ==
Chairmen

#	Name	Took office	Left office	Remarks
1	Ahmad Boestamam	31 August 1957	17 April 1961	
2	Ishak Mohamed	17 April 1961	10 January 1966	

== Elected representatives ==
- Members of the Dewan Rakyat, 1st Malayan Parliament
- List of Malaysian State Assembly Representatives (1959–64)
- Members of the Dewan Rakyat, 2nd Malaysian Parliament
- List of Malaysian State Assembly Representatives (1964–69)

== General elections result ==
Election	Total seats won	Seats contested	Total votes	Share of votes	Outcome of election	Election leader
1959	8 / 104	104	199,688	12.9%	▲8 seats; Opposition coalition	Ahmad Boestaman
1964	2 / 104	104	330,898	16.1%	▼6 seats; Opposition coalition	Tan Chee Khoon

== State election results ==
State election	State Legislative Assembly													
State election	Perlis State Legislative Assembly	Kedah State Legislative Assembly	Kelantan State Legislative Assembly	Terengganu State Legislative Assembly	Penang State Legislative Assembly	Perak State Legislative Assembly	Pahang State Legislative Assembly	Selangor State Legislative Assembly	Negeri Sembilan State Legislative Assembly	Malacca State Legislative Assembly	Johor State Legislative Assembly	Sabah State Legislative Assembly	Sarawak State Legislative Assembly	Total won / Total contested
1959	0 / 12	0 / 24	0 / 30	0 / 24	7 / 24	0 / 40	0 / 24	3 / 28	3 / 24	0 / 20	3 / 32			16 / 124
1964	0 / 12	0 / 24	0 / 30	0 / 24	2 / 24	0 / 40	0 / 24	4 / 28	0 / 24	2 / 20	0 / 32			8 / 167
