= Selangor Labour Party =

Selangor Labour Party Parti Buruh Selangor
- Founded: 22 December 1951
- Dissolved: 1952
- Succeeded by: Pan-Malayan Labour Party
- Headquarters: Selangor, Malaya

The Selangor Labour Party (Malay: Parti Buruh Selangor) was a political party in Selangor, Malaya. The party was founded on 22 December 1951. As of 1953, K.C. Chia was the chairman of the party, A. Tharmalingam the secretary and M. Arokiasamy the vice chairman. The party was represented in the Federal Legislative Council by Wong Pak Choy.

The Selangor Labour Party cooperated with the Malayan Trades Union Council, and the party helped the MTUC to build the Mill Workers Union of Selangor and the Shop Workers Union of Selangor. Two party members sat in the Central Committee of MTUC, Wong Pak Choy and Lee Moke Sang (a member of the party Executive). The party had also assigned Lee Moke Sang to build the youth wing of the party.

The party had links with labour parties in Penang, Malacca, Perak and Singapore. On 26 June 1952, these parties formed the Pan-Malayan Labour Party, as a union of statewise labour parties. The Selangor Labour Party became an affiliate of PMLP. Mohamed Soppi had been the secretary of the Selangor Labour Party at the time of its foundation, but left this position to assume chairmanship of the Pan-Malayan Labour Party. Lee Moke Sang became General Secretary of PMLP. The PMLP would later become the Labour Party of Malaya.
