= Hasnul Abdul Hadi =

Socialist politician (1927–1982)

Personal details
- Born: Hasnul bin Abdul Hadi; 11 March 1927 Malacca, Straits Settlement
- Died: 30 April 1982
- Party: United Malays National Organisation (UMNO) (1953–1958); Parti Sosialis Rakyat Malaysia (PSRM) (1958–1982)
- Relatives: Abdul Hadi Abdul Hassan (father); Abdul Hai Abdul Hadi & Rastam Abdul Hadi (brothers)

Hasnul bin Abdul Hadi (11 March 1927 – 30 April 1982) was a socialist politician and political detainee in Malaysia.

A leader of the Parti Rakyat Malaysia and Malayan Peoples' Socialist Front coalition, he was also elected as head of the municipal council of Malacca, before local council elections were abolished by the ruling Alliance party.

== Biography ==
He was born on 11 March 1927 to a distinguished intellectual family. His father Abdul Hadi Abdul Hassan was the author of three volume Sejarah Alam Melayu in the 1920s.

An older brother Rastam went on to serve as Petronas MD and Bank Negara deputy governor, while another older brother Abdul Hai was involved in the Parti Kebangsaan Melayu Malaya led by Ibrahim Yaacob and Ishak Haji Muhammad, serving as secretary of the PKMM Melaka branch.

Hasnul went to school in his native Malacca, even attending during the Japanese occupation. After World War II he attended Teacher's Training College in Singapore before becoming a journalist with the Melayu Raya newspaper.

He first joined the fledgling UMNO and served as secretary to future prime minister Tunku Abdul Rahman for two years beginning in 1953. He then moved back to Malacca in 1955, serving as part of the state's UMNO leadership. However he was more drawn to socialism and in 1958 joined the Parti Rakyat Malaysia becoming a leader of its Malacca chapter.

In 1961, he led the Socialist Front to take over Malacca municipal council, effectively serving as mayor. Arrested and detained without trial under the Internal Security Act in 1965, he declined to agree to terms for early release. While in detention, his wife petitioned for a divorce.

He contested and lost in three general elections for the seats of Malacca Tengah (1964), Bandar Malacca (1969) and Batu Berandam (1974).

In 1978, his defamation case against Utusan Melayu (Bulat Mohamed & Anor) was heard in court and it was held that to call a person ‘Abu Jahal’ is defamatory.

Paralysed by a stroke in 1977, he died in 1982. A book of his writings called Mereka Yang Terbiar was released shortly before his death.

== Election results ==
Parliament of Malaysia
Year	Constituency	Candidate	Votes	Pct	Opponent(s)	Votes	Pct	Ballots cast	Majority	Turnout
1964	P085 Malacca Tengah	Hasnul Abdul Hadi (PRM)	5,241	20.93%	Tan Siew Sin (MCA)	18,568	74.14%	25,045	13,327	84.29%
1964	P085 Malacca Tengah	Hasnul Abdul Hadi (PRM)	5,241	20.93%	Mohamed Kamal Sudin (PMIP)	1,236	4.94%	25,045	13,327	84.29%
1969	P086 Bandar Malacca	Hasnul Abdul Hadi (PSRM)	4,621	15.14%	Lim Kit Siang (DAP)	18,562	60.80%	30,529	11,216	73.77%
1969	P086 Bandar Malacca	Hasnul Abdul Hadi (PSRM)	4,621	15.14%	Koh Kim Leng (MCA)	7,346	24.06%	30,529	11,216	73.77%
1974	P097 Batu Berendam	Hasnul Abdul Hadi (PSRM)	8,111	28.76%	Chong Hon Nyan (MCA)	18,182	64.47%	28,203	10,071	78.17%
1974	P097 Batu Berendam	Hasnul Abdul Hadi (PSRM)	8,111	28.76%	Maidin Manaf (IND)	1,910	6.77%	28,203	10,071	78.17%
