= M. K. Rajakumar =

Dr. M. K. Rajakumar (25 May 1932 – 22 November 2008) was a Malaysian doctor and socialist politician. As a doctor, he was a pioneer of the discipline of Family Medicine by general practitioners in Malaysia. As a leftist intellectual he was among the leaders of the Labour Party of Malaya and Barisan Sosialis in the 1960s, helping to build the Labour Party alongside Tan Chee Khoon, V. David and Ishak Haji Muhammad (better known as Pak Sako).

== Early life and political activities ==
He was born in Melaka on 25 May 1932. From the Malacca High School, he obtained a scholarship to study medicine at the University of Malaya in Singapore. There, he set up the Socialist Club and served as its President for the 1954/55 term. Besides that, he was elected as a member of the Students’ Council.

In the 1950s, while studying medicine at the Singapore campus of the University of Malaya, Rajakumar was active in the University Socialist Club, where he met historian Khoo Kay Kim and former Parti Sosialis Rakyat Malaysia president Kassim Ahmad, who were also students. Rajakumar, then 22 years old, was involved with the editorial board of Fajar, the Socialist Club's newspaper.

The team behind the newsletter were soon accused of sedition and prosecuted. Rajakumar and the Fajar board were defended by the radical British QC Denis Pritt, with Lee Kuan Yew (later the first Prime Minister of Singapore) as junior counsel.

Rajakumar graduated from the University of Malaya in 1956, and went on to become chairman of the Selangor Labour Party. He was detained under the Internal Security Act from 1966 to 1969. His political influence waned after the decline of the Barisan Socialis in the late 1960s and he focused primarily on his career in medicine.

== Medical career ==
Rajakumar advocated for affordable healthcare and spearheaded an in-depth review of the Malaysian Healthcare System in 1970s. He was also responsible for setting up the 'Malaysian Physicians for the Prevention of Nuclear War' (MPPNW) within the MMA. He then served as MMA president from 1979 to 1980.

He also set up the Malaysian Academy of Primary Health Care Physicians. In 2008, the World Organisation of Family Doctors (WONCA) established the 'Rajakumar Movement' to foster mentoring between current and future leaders in family medicine in the Asia Pacific region.

His professional memberships included the Royal College of Physicians in Edinburgh, the Royal College of General Practitioners, and the Royal Australian College of General Practitioners.

== Personal life ==
Rajakumar was married to Ong Kik Hong and had three children: venture capitalist Datin Sunita Mei-Lin; Kiren Su-Lin in London; and Arjuna, a vice-president at HSBC Hong Kong. He also had one granddaughter.

Rajakumar's daughter Datin Sunita is married to the son of former senator Tan Sri Dr C. Sinnadurai. For the last two years of his life, he was cared for by his son-in-law Datuk Dr Jeyaindran Sinnadurai, the head of general medicine at Hospital Kuala Lumpur, and the deputy director general of health (medicine).

He died on 22 November 2008 at 3am in Hospital Kuala Lumpur aged 76, from heart and lung complications following a bout of pneumonia.
