= United Democratic Party (Malaysia) =

United Democratic Party Parti Kesatuan Ra'ayat 民主联合党
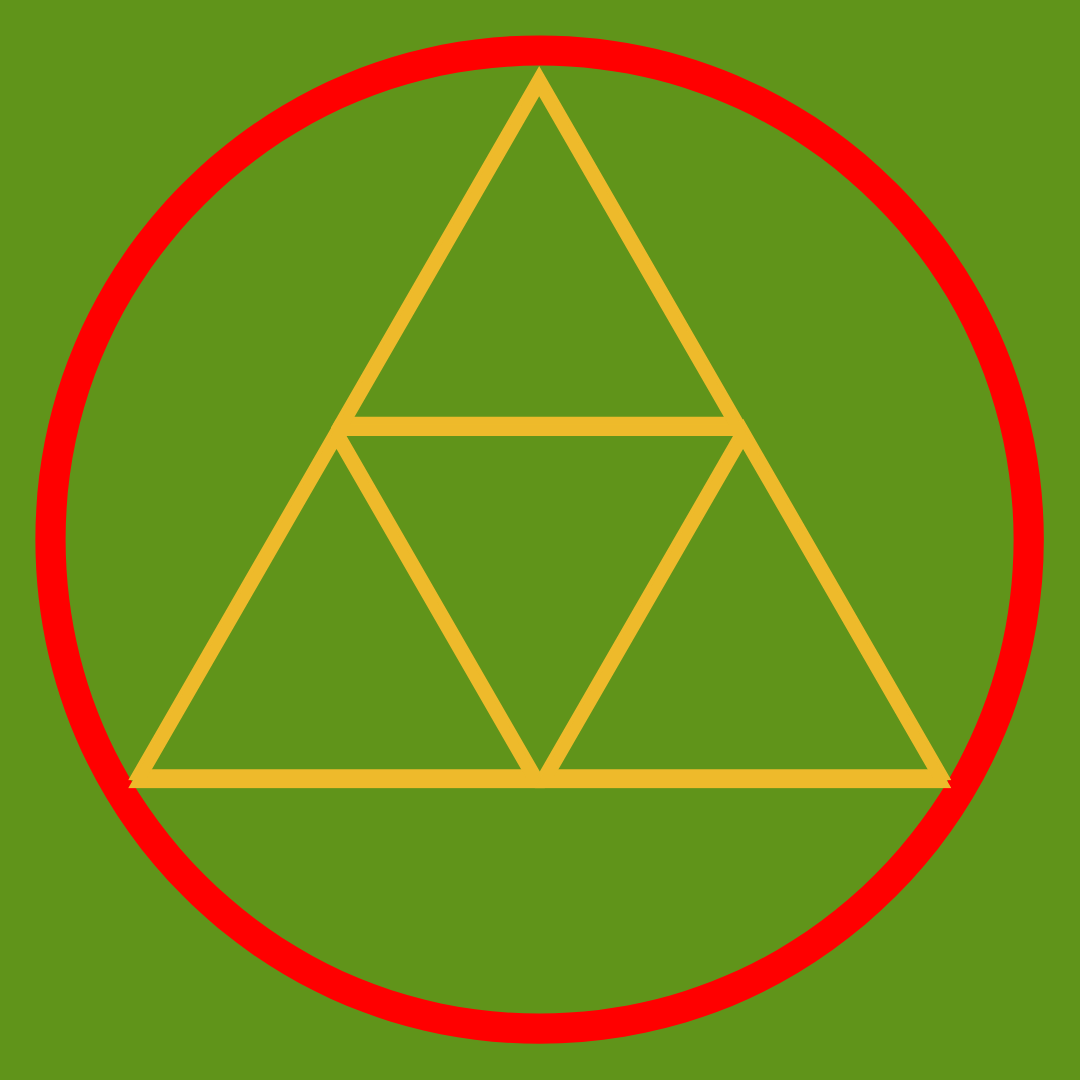
- Abbreviation: UDP
- Leader: Lim Chong Eu
- President: Zainal Abidin Abas
- Secretary-General: Lim Chong Eu
- Founder: Lim Chong Eu
- Founded: April 21, 1962
- Registered: 18 June 1962
- Dissolved: March 24, 1968
- Split from: Malaysian Chinese Association
- Succeeded by: Parti Gerakan Rakyat Malaysia
- Political position: Center-left
- National affiliation: Malaysian Solidarity Convention (1965–1966)

The United Democratic Party (UDP, Chinese: 民主联合党) was a political party in Malaysia.

== History ==
The party was established by Lim Chong Eu and several other former members of the Malayan Chinese Association (MCA) on 21 April 1962. Largely supported by middle-class Chinese voters, the party won a single seat in the 1964 general elections, with Lim elected in Tanjong.

The party was dissolved on 23 June 1968 after Lim had helped to establish the Parti Gerakan Rakyat Malaysia (Gerakan).

== Elections results ==
=== General elections ===
Election	Leader	Votes	%	Seats	Status
1964	Lim Chong Eu	88,223	4.29	1 / 104	Opposition

=== State elections ===
Election	State legislative assembly						Total
Election	Kedah	Penang	Perak	Pahang	Negeri Sembilan	Johor	Total
1964	0 / 24	4 / 24	0 / 40	0 / 24	0 / 24	0 / 32	4 / 168
