= Karam Singh Veriah =

Malaysian politician

Yang Berbahagia Karam Singh Veriah

Vice President of Parti Ra'ayat
- In office 1957–1964

Member of Parliament for Damansara
- In office 19 August 1959 – 25 April 1964
- Preceded by: constituency created
- Succeeded by: Michael Chen Wing Sum
- Majority: 3,373 (1959)

Member of the Selangor State Legislative Assembly for Serdang
- In office 19 August 1959 – 25 April 1964
- Preceded by: constituency created
- Succeeded by: Chin Kek Kum
- Majority: 1,889 (1959)

Personal details
- Born: Karam Singh Veriah; October 26, 1936 Seremban, Negeri Sembilan Malaysia
- Died: January 22, 1994 (aged 57) New Delhi, India
- Party: Parti Ra'ayat (PR) (1957-1966); Socialist Democratic Party (SDP) (1985-1986)
- Spouse: Harbans Kaur Muker
- Children: 3
- Occupation: Politician, lawyer, activist

Karam Singh Veriah (October 26, 1936 - January 22, 1994), was a socialist politician from Malaysia. He won the Damansara seat at 23 in the 1959 elections, representing Parti Rakyat Malaysia which was then part of the Socialist Front coalition.

He simultaneously won the Serdang seat in the Selangor state assembly. In 1967, he was detained without trial for four years under Malaysia's Internal Security Act. Upon his release, he continued working as a lawyer and activist but eventually died of a heart attack in 1994.

== Career ==
Karam was the eldest in a family of five boys and four girls. He was born on October 26, 1936 in Seremban, Negeri Sembilan. His father, Kaher Singh Veriah, was a clerk who later studied law and joined the Malaysian Indian Congress.He was elected as Port Dickson assemblyperson in the 1955 elections held just prior to Malaya's independence. Kaher died in a car accident in 1964.

Karam studied at King George V School in Seremban. He did his Senior Cambridge at 15 and completed law studies by 19 at Gray's Inn, London. But the rules of the time prevented him from practising until he was 21. He then returned to Malaya and threw himself into electoral politics as a member of the Socialist Front.

He also worked as legal adviser for the United Malayan Estate Workers Union, Malayan Workers Welfare Society and the Socialist Youth League. Karam was also vice-president of PRM during the time of Ahmad Boestamam's leadership, being elected to the role in November 1957.

In the 1959 elections, he contested the Damansara parliamentary seat against MCA's Lee Eng Teh. He won decisively by garnering 9,026 votes compared to Lee's tally of 5,653.

Karam also won the Serdang state assembly seat by defeating another MCA man Chan Chee Hong by a majority of 1,889 votes. He polled 5,883 votes against Chan's 3,994.

However he did not defend his seats in the 1964 election which was held soon after the formation of Malaysia. In April 1967, he was detained for four years in solitary confinement under the ISA for leading a march of sacked rubber plantation workers from Bukit Asahan Estate in Malacca to Kuala Lumpur.

Described by his party colleague Dr Syed Husin Ali as a gentle speaker who could be fiery in Parliament, Karam Singh was also drawn to the struggle for justice in India.

Karam brought his family to India and took up the cause of low-ranking police officers. However, his successes in agitation got him expelled from India and he was denied entry for many years. In 1985, he briefly joined the DAP splinter party Socialist Democratic Party, led by ex-MP Fan Yew Teng.

Karam died in New Delhi in the mid-1990s, aged 57.

== Personal life ==
He was married to Harbans Kaur Muker, who worked as a temporary teacher at Assunta Primary School during his detention. She died on March 6, 1973.

His daughter Harinder died in Hong Kong on January 2, 2000.Her widowed husband, leftist journalist Martin Jacques filed a lawsuit over her death claiming racial prejudice and medical negligence at the hospital which treated her.

His son Keshminder served as a municipal councillor in Subang Jaya appointed by Parti Keadilan Rakyat, following its breakthrough in the 2008 general elections in Malaysia. He died on November 28, 2023.

Another daughter Jasvinder is the author of popular cookbook Champur: Flavours from a Malaysian Home.

== Election results ==
Parliament of Federation of Malaya
Year	Constituency	Candidate	Votes	Pct	Opponent(s)	Votes	Pct	Ballots cast	Majority	Turnout
1959	P073 Damansara, Selangor	Karam Singh Veriah (SF)	9,026	61.49%	Lee Eng Teh (MCA)	5,653	38.51%	14,679	3,373	75.40%

Selangor State Legislative Assembly
Year	Constituency	Candidate	Votes	Pct	Opponent(s)	Votes	Pct	Ballots cast	Majority	Turnout
1959	Serdang	Karam Singh Veriah (SF)	5,883	59.56%	Chan Chee Hong (MCA)	3,994	40.44%	9,877	1,889	74.69
