= 1959 Malayan general election =

- 19 August 1959

All 104 seats in the Dewan Rakyat 53 seats needed for a majority
- Registered: 2,133,272
- Turnout: 73.34%
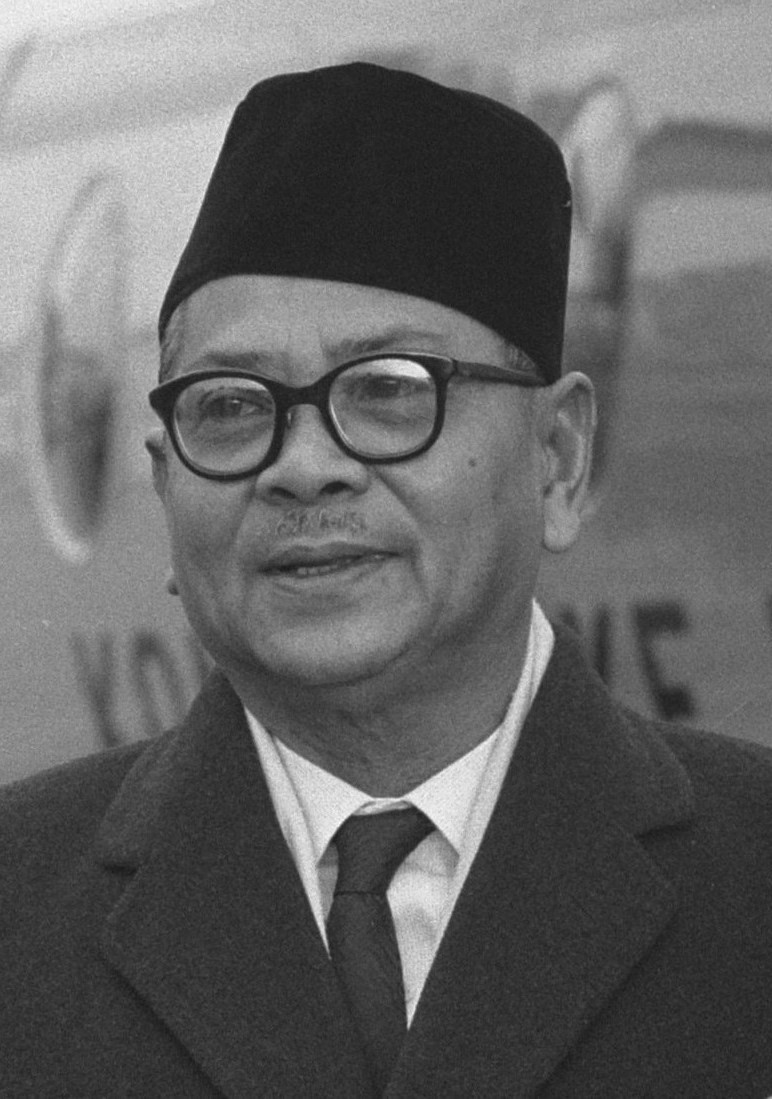

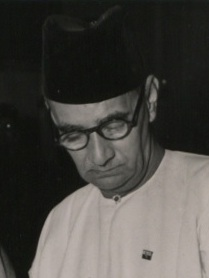
	First party	Second party	Third party
Leader	Tunku Abdul Rahman	Burhanuddin al-Helmy	Ahmad Boestamam
Party	Alliance	PMIP	Socialist Front
Last election	81.68%, 51 seats	4.06%, 1 seat	0.48%, 0 seats
Seats won	74	13	8
Seat change	▲23	▲12	▲8
Popular vote	800,944	329,070	199,688
Percentage	51.77%	21.27%	12.91%
Swing	▼29.91pp	▲17.21pp	▲12.43pp
	Fourth party	Fifth party	Sixth party
			MP
Leader	D. R. Seenivasagam	Onn Jaafar	Tan Kee Gak
Party	PPP	National Party	Malayan Party
Last election	0.11%, 0 seats	7.88%, 0 seats	–
Seats won	4	1	1
Seat change	▲4	▲1	New
Popular vote	97,391	32,578	13,404
Percentage	6.29%	2.11%	0.87%
Swing	▲6.18pp	▼5.77pp	New
- Results by constituency
Prime Minister before election
Tunku Abdul Rahman
Alliance
Prime Minister-designate
Tunku Abdul Rahman
Alliance

General elections were held in the Federation of Malaya on Wednesday, 19 August 1959 for members of the first Parliament of the Federation of Malaya, the first parliamentary election in Malaya. It was the third national-wide election held in Malaya since the end of World War II. This would be the last Malayan election, before the country was superseded by Malaysia with three other states of Sarawak, Sabah and Singapore in 1963. Voting took place in all 104 parliamentary constituencies of Malaya, each electing one Member of Parliament to the Dewan Rakyat, the dominant house of Parliament. Voter turnout was 73.34%.

Prior to the general election, state elections took place in all 282 state constituencies in 11 states of Malaya from 20 May to 24 June 1959, each electing one Member to the State Legislative Assembly, the Dewan Undangan Negeri. As a result, PAS took over the administration of Terengganu and Kelantan but served only 2 terms before being retaken by Alliance.

The results saw Alliance Party emerged as the victor in a landslide victory. The party was a coalition formed by United Malays National Organisation, Malayan Chinese Association and Malayan Indian Congress. The coalition won 74 out of 104 seats in the Dewan Rakyat with only 52% of the total vote. The opposition as a whole won 30 seats with 48% of the vote. Three Alliance candidates contested unopposed. The 71% majority allowed Alliance Party to form a government as sanctioned by the constitution of Malaya.

When results were announced on the morning of 20 August, only 103 seats were returned as elections in the Kedah Tengah (Central Kedah) constituency was delayed until 30 September. The Alliance proceeded to win this seat with Khir Johari as the winning candidate.

== Timelines ==
=== Dewan Rakyat ===
- Nomination date: 15 July 1959
- Election day: 19 August 1959

=== State legislative assemblies ===
State	Nomination Date	State election
Perlis	15 April 1959	20 May 1959
Kedah	15 April 1959	20 May 1959
Malacca	18 April 1959	23 May 1959
Perak	22 April 1959	27 May 1959
Selangor	25 April 1959	30 May 1959
Negeri Sembilan	28 April 1959	2 June 1959
Penang	2 May 1959	6 June 1959
Johor	6 May 1959	10 June 1959
Pahang	13 May 1959	27 June 1959
Terengganu	16 May 1959	20 June 1959
Kelantan	20 May 1959	24 June 1959

== Results ==
Party or alliance		Votes	%	Seats	+/–
Alliance Party	United Malays National Organisation	552,595	35.71	52	+18
Alliance Party	Malayan Chinese Association	229,229	14.82	19	+4
Alliance Party	Malayan Indian Congress	19,120	1.24	3	+1
Alliance Party	Total	800,944	51.77	74	+23
Pan-Malayan Islamic Party		329,070	21.27	13	+12
Malayan Peoples'; Socialist Front	Labour Party of Malaya	146,608	9.48	6	+6
Malayan Peoples'; Socialist Front	Parti Ra'ayat	53,080	3.43	2	New
Malayan Peoples'; Socialist Front	Total	199,688	12.91	8	New
People's Progressive Party		97,391	6.29	4	+4
Parti Negara		32,578	2.11	1	+1
Malayan Party		13,404	0.87	1	New
Independents		74,194	4.80	3	+3
Total		1,547,269	100.00	104	+52
Valid votes		1,547,269	98.89		
Invalid/blank votes		17,306	1.11		
Total votes		1,564,575	100.00		
Registered voters/turnout		2,133,272	73.34		
Source: Nohlen et al.

Registered voters above refers to total voters of the contested constituencies. Total electorate for the 1959 elections is 2177755 which includes uncontested parliamentary constituencies of Port Dickson, Johore Tenggara and Kemaman.

Information for the division of voters between Labour Party of Malaya and Parti Ra'ayat is limited

=== By state ===
==== Johore ====
Party or alliance		Votes	%	Seats	+/–
Alliance Party	United Malays National Organisation	98,394	46.09	11	+7
Alliance Party	Malayan Chinese Association	41,825	19.59	5	+2
Alliance Party	Total	140,219	65.68	16	+2
Malayan Peoples'; Socialist Front	Labour Party of Malaya	25,810	12.09	0	–
Malayan Peoples'; Socialist Front	Parti Ra'ayat	4,501	2.11	0	–
Malayan Peoples'; Socialist Front	Total	30,311	14.20	0	–
Pan-Malayan Islamic Party		4,992	2.34	0	–
People's Progressive Party		2,162	1.01	0	–
Parti Negara		19,931	9.34	0	–
Independent		15,878	7.44	0	–
Total		213,493	100.00	16	0
Valid votes		213,493	98.83		
Invalid/blank votes		2,534	1.17		
Total votes		216,027	100.00		
Registered voters/turnout		280,244	77.09		
Source: Tindak Malaysia's Github

The registered voters refers to total voters of the contested constituencies.Total electorate of Johor including uncontested constituency of Johore Tenggara is 291230 voters.

==== Kedah ====
Party or alliance		Votes	%	Seats	+/–
Alliance Party	United Malays National Organisation	105,918	54.05	10	+6
Alliance Party	Malayan Chinese Association	22,047	11.25	2	0
Alliance Party	Total	127,965	65.31	12	+6
Pan-Malayan Islamic Party		52,235	26.66	0	0
Malayan Peoples'; Socialist Front	Labour Party of Malaya	7,235	3.69	0	New
Malayan Peoples'; Socialist Front	Parti Ra'ayat	6,907	3.52	0	New
Malayan Peoples'; Socialist Front	Total	14,142	7.22	0	New
Independents		1,605	0.82	0	0
Total		195,947	100.00	12	+6
Valid votes		195,947	98.75		
Invalid/blank votes		2,481	1.25		
Total votes		198,428	100.00		
Registered voters/turnout		268,115	74.01		
Source: Tindak Malaysia Github

==== Kelantan ====
Party	Votes	%	Seats	+/–
Pan-Malayan Islamic Party	116,087	68.38	9	+9
United Malays National Organisation	53,382	31.45	1	–4
Parti Negara	292	0.17	0	–4
Total	169,761	100.00	10	+5
Valid votes	169,761	99.16		
Invalid/blank votes	1,446	0.84		
Total votes	171,207	100.00		
Registered voters/turnout	240,522	71.18		
Source: Tindak Malaysia Github

==== Malacca ====
Party or alliance		Votes	%	Seats	+/–
Alliance Party	United Malays National Organisation	22,378	29.97	2	+1
Alliance Party	Malayan Chinese Association	21,808	29.21	1	0
Alliance Party	Total	44,186	59.18	3	+1
Pan-Malayan Islamic Party		12,133	16.25	0	–
Malayan Party		9,396	12.58	1	New
Malayan Peoples'; Socialist Front	Labour Party of Malaya	5,812	7.78	0	–
Malayan Peoples'; Socialist Front	Parti Ra'ayat	2,872	3.85	0	–
Malayan Peoples'; Socialist Front	Total	8,684	11.63	0	–
Independent		265	0.35	0	–
Total		74,664	100.00	4	+2
Valid votes		74,664	99.10		
Invalid/blank votes		680	0.90		
Total votes		75,344	100.00		
Registered voters/turnout		93,737	80.38		
Source: Tindak Malaysia Github

==== Negeri Sembilan ====
Party or alliance		Votes	%	Seats	+/–
Alliance Party	United Malays National Organisation	32,164	44.27	3	+1
Alliance Party	Malayan Indian Congress	3,409	4.69	1	New
Alliance Party	Malayan Chinese Association	2,061	2.84	0	–1
Alliance Party	Total	37,634	51.80	4	+1
Malayan Peoples'; Socialist Front	Labour Party of Malaya	7,934	10.92	0	–
Malayan Peoples'; Socialist Front	Total	7,934	10.92	0	–
Pan-Malayan Islamic Party		12,103	16.66	0	New
Parti Negara		4,369	6.01	0	–
Independents		10,607	14.60	2	+2
Total		72,647	100.00	6	+3
Valid votes		72,647	98.97		
Invalid/blank votes		756	1.03		
Total votes		73,403	100.00		
Registered voters/turnout		95,573	76.80		
Source: Tindak Malaysia Github

Registered voters shown above refers to the total number of voters of contested constituencies. Actual electorate size of Negeri Sembilan is 111336 voters which includes uncontesed constituency of Port Dickson.

==== Pahang ====
Party or alliance		Votes	%	Seats	+/–
Alliance Party	United Malays National Organisation	44,143	55.95	5	+2
Alliance Party	Malayan Chinese Association	8,643	10.96	1	New
Alliance Party	Total	52,786	66.91	6	+3
Malayan Peoples'; Socialist Front	Labour Party of Malaya	11,806	14.96	0	–
Malayan Peoples'; Socialist Front	Parti Ra'ayat	5,130	6.50	0	–
Malayan Peoples'; Socialist Front	Total	16,936	21.47	0	–
Pan-Malayan Islamic Party		9,169	11.62	0	0
Total		78,891	100.00	6	+3
Valid votes		78,891	99.01		
Invalid/blank votes		790	0.99		
Total votes		79,681	100.00		
Registered voters/turnout		109,535	72.74		
Source: Tindak Malaysia Github

==== Penang ====
Party or alliance		Votes	%	Seats	+/–
Alliance Party	United Malays National Organisation	31,756	23.22	3	+1
Alliance Party	Malayan Chinese Association	28,493	20.83	2	0
Alliance Party	Total	60,249	44.05	5	+1
Labour Party of Malaya		52,237	38.19	3	+3
Pan-Malayan Islamic Party		14,829	10.84	0	0
People's Progressive Party		3,899	2.85	0	New
Independents		5,569	4.07	0	0
Total		136,783	100.00	8	+4
Valid votes		136,783	99.02		
Invalid/blank votes		1,358	0.98		
Total votes		138,141	100.00		
Registered voters/turnout		188,668	73.22		
Source: Tindak Malaysia Github

==== Perak ====
Party or alliance		Votes	%	Seats	+/–
Alliance Party	United Malays National Organisation	77,147	24.85	9	+4
Alliance Party	Malayan Chinese Association	69,592	22.41	5	+2
Alliance Party	Malayan Indian Congress	7,317	2.36	1	0
Alliance Party	Total	154,056	49.62	15	+6
People's Progressive Party		83,509	26.90	4	+1
Pan-Malayan Islamic Party		47,757	15.38	0	–1
Malayan Peoples'; Socialist Front	Labour Party of Malaya	1,452	0.47	0	–
Malayan Peoples'; Socialist Front	Parti Ra'ayat	7,410	2.39	0	–
Malayan Peoples'; Socialist Front	Total	8,862	2.85	0	–
Independents		16,296	5.25	1	+1
Total		310,480	100.00	20	+10
Valid votes		310,480	98.77		
Invalid/blank votes		3,881	1.23		
Total votes		314,361	100.00		
Registered voters/turnout		449,969	69.86		
Source: Tindak Malaysia Github

==== Perlis ====
Party	Votes	%	Seats	+/–
United Malays National Organisation	17,653	59.63	2	+1
Pan-Malayan Islamic Party	11,950	40.37	0	New
Total	29,603	100.00	2	+1
Valid votes	29,603	99.25		
Invalid/blank votes	223	0.75		
Total votes	29,826	100.00		
Registered voters/turnout	38,355	77.76		
Source: Tindak Malaysia Github

==== Selangor ====
Party or alliance		Votes	%	Seats	+/–
Alliance Party	United Malays National Organisation	44,423	22.49	5	+1
Alliance Party	Malayan Chinese Association	34,760	17.59	3	0
Alliance Party	Malayan Indian Congress	8,394	4.25	1	New
Alliance Party	Total	87,577	44.33	9	+2
Malayan Peoples'; Socialist Front	Labour Party of Malaya	34,322	17.37	3	0
Malayan Peoples'; Socialist Front	Parti Ra'ayat	25,665	12.99	2	New
Malayan Peoples'; Socialist Front	Total	59,987	30.36	5	New
Pan-Malayan Islamic Party		15,691	7.94	0	0
People's Progressive Party		7,821	3.96	0	0
Malayan Party		4,008	2.03	0	0
Independent		22,477	11.38	0	0
Total		197,561	100.00	14	+7
Valid votes		197,561	98.87		
Invalid/blank votes		2,259	1.13		
Total votes		199,820	100.00		
Registered voters/turnout		271,360	73.64		
Source: Tindak Malaysia Github

==== Terengganu ====
Party	Votes	%	Seats	+/–
Pan-Malayan Islamic Party	32,124	47.63	4	New
United Malays National Organisation	25,237	37.42	1	–2
Parti Negara	7,986	11.84	1	+1
Parti Ra'ayat	595	0.88	0	New
Independents	1,497	2.22	0	New
Total	67,439	100.00	6	+3
Valid votes	67,439	98.69		
Invalid/blank votes	898	1.31		
Total votes	68,337	100.00		
Registered voters/turnout	97,164	70.33		
Source: Tindak Malaysia Github

The registered voters above refer to total voters of contested constituencies. The total electorate of Trengganu is 114898 which includes uncontested parliamentary constituency of Kemaman
