= 1964 Malaysian general election =

- 25 April 1964

104 of the 159 seats in the Dewan Rakyat 53 seats needed for a majority
- Registered: 2,681,895
- Turnout: 80.03%
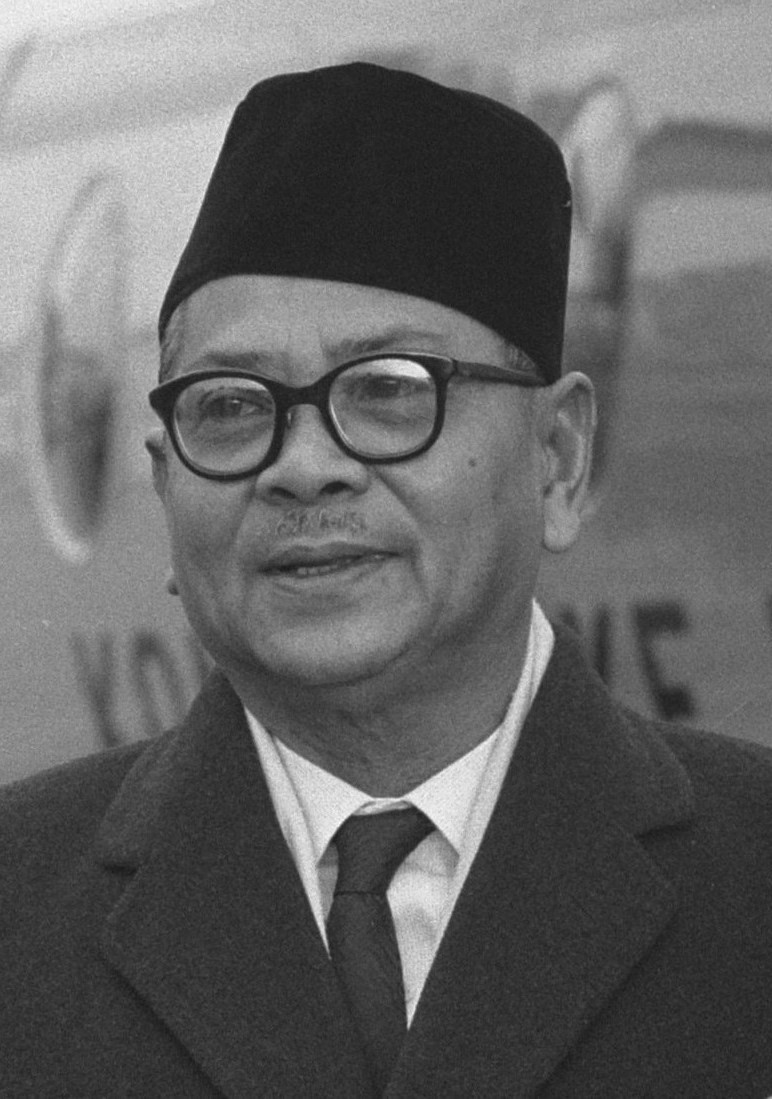

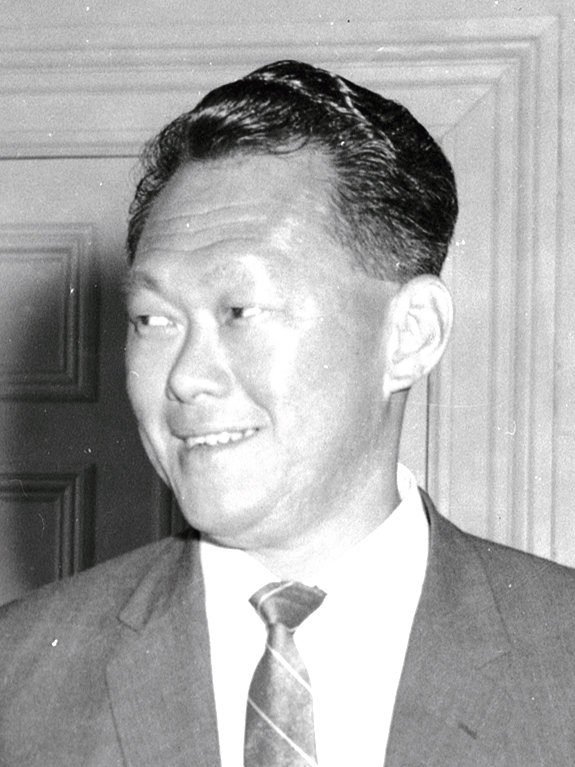
	First party	Second party	Third party
Leader	Tunku Abdul Rahman	Tan Chee Khoon	Burhanuddin al-Helmy
Party	Alliance	Socialist Front	PAS
Last election	51.8%, 74 seats	12.9%, 8 seats	21.3%, 13 seats
Seats won	89	2	9
Seat change	▲15	▼6	▼4
Popular vote	1,204,340	330,898	301,187
Percentage	58.5%	16.1%	14.6%
Swing	▲6.7pp	▲3.2pp	▼6.7pp
	Fourth party	Fifth party	Sixth party
Leader	Lim Chong Eu	D. R. Seenivasagam	Lee Kuan Yew
Party	UDP	PPP	PAP
Last election	–	6.3%, 4 seats	–
Seats won	1	2	1
Seat change	New	▼2	New
Popular vote	88,223	69,898	42,130
Percentage	4.3pp	3.4%	2.0%
Swing	New	▼2.9pp	New
Prime Minister before election
Tunku Abdul Rahman
Alliance
Prime Minister-designate
Tunku Abdul Rahman
Alliance

General elections were held in Malaysia on Saturday, 25 April 1964, to elect members of the expanded Dewan Rakyat, the lower house of the bicameral Parliament of Malaysia. These were the first federal elections since the Malaysia Agreement of 1963, which transformed the Federation of Malaya into Malaysia with the addition of Singapore, Sabah and Sarawak. However, general elections were not held in these new states at the time. Voting took place in 104 of the 159 parliamentary constituencies, each returning one Member of Parliament (MP). State elections were also held on the same day in 282 state constituencies across 11 of Malaysia's 14 states, each electing one Member of the Legislative Assembly (MLA).

The elections resulted in a victory for the Alliance Party, which secured 89 of the 104 contested seats with a voter turnout of 80 percent. Two Alliance candidates were returned uncontested. The outcome is regarded as one of the factors that contributed to the eventual expulsion of Singapore from Malaysia. The Singapore-based People's Action Party (PAP) had contested seats in the peninsula in response to the United Malays National Organisation (UMNO) participating in the 1963 Singaporean general election, in breach of a prior agreement not to do so. Although the PAP drew large crowds at its rallies, it only won one seat out of nine contested, with Devan Nair elected at Bangsar. Some historians attribute the results to the Malayan Chinese Association (MCA) retaining its position as the "undisputed leader of the Chinese in the Malayan peninsula" to then Minister of Finance and MCA President Tan Siew Sin's appeal to the ethnic Chinese community to refrain from "challenging Malay special rights" and risking closer alignment with Indonesia. Nevertheless, Alliance leaders, particularly within UMNO and the MCA, were angered by the PAP's actions and regarded the party, as well as Lee Kuan Yew's personal appeal among voters, as a threat to their political dominance.

As the first parliamentary general election held after the formation of Malaysia in 1963, no elections took place in Singapore, Sabah or Sarawak. Under transitional provisions, voters of these three states are to select their parliamentary representatives at the next election. Together, the three states were allocated 55 seats – 15 for Singapore, 16 for Sabah and 24 for Sarawak – representing 35 percent of the 159 seats in Parliament. This allocation was intended as a check and balance to prevent the passage of constitutional amendments, which required a two-thirds majority, without the consent of representatives from the new states. However, following Singapore's expulsion from Malaysia, Sabah and Sarawak together held only 28 percent of parliamentary seats (40 out of 144), reducing their ability to block legislation that eroded the special rights granted to them as equal partners at the formation of Malaysia. The share fell further to 25 percent after the 1974 general election and, despite increases in the total number of seats over the years, has remained nearly constant since.

== Background ==
In the lead-up to the election, Malaysia was still grappling with the political implications of its recent formation in September 1963. The merger of Malaya with Singapore, Sabah and Sarawak introduced complex federal dynamics and heightened ethnic sensitivities, particularly among Malay nationalists concerned about the demographic impact of Singapore's predominantly Chinese population. These anxieties were intensified by perceptions that the People's Action Party (PAP), led by prime minister of Singapore Lee Kuan Yew, sought to extend its influence into Peninsular Malaysia. United Malays National Organisation (UMNO) leaders, notably prime Minister of Malaysia Tunku Abdul Rahman, viewed this as a direct challenge to Malay political supremacy within the federation.

The political atmosphere was increasingly polarised along communal lines. The ruling Alliance coalition, although formally multiethnic, was dominated by UMNO and reliant on a formula of ethnic power-sharing that prioritised Malay political leadership. In contrast, opposition parties advanced varied critiques of the Alliance's race-based policies, with Islamist groups appealing to conservative Malay-Muslim sentiment, while leftist movements emphasised class-based inequality and opposed what they perceived as the consolidation of elite interests under the Alliance. Tensions were further heightened by the Konfrontasi with Indonesia, which saw President Sukarno opposing the formation of Malaysia as a neo-colonial project. This external threat led the Alliance to campaign on a platform of national unity and anti-communism, portraying dissenting voices as threats to stability. The Internal Security Act (ISA) was used to detain political opponents, curtailing the activities of some left-wing and labour-aligned groups.

== Results ==
Party or alliance		Votes	%	Seats			
Party or alliance		Votes	%	Elected	Appointed	Total	+/–
Alliance Party	United Malays National Organisation	794,578	38.62	59	0	59	+7
Alliance Party	Malaysian Chinese Association	377,969	18.37	27	0	27	+8
Alliance Party	Malaysian Indian Congress	31,793	1.55	3	0	3	0
Alliance Party	Total	1,204,340	58.53	89	0	89	+15
Malayan Peoples'; Socialist Front	Labour Party of Malaya	212,546	10.33	2	0	2	–4
Malayan Peoples'; Socialist Front	Parti Ra'ayat	103,045	5.01	0	0	0	–2
Malayan Peoples'; Socialist Front	Parti Perhimpunan Kebangsaan	15,307	0.74	0	0	0	New
Malayan Peoples'; Socialist Front	Total	330,898	16.08	2	0	2	–6
Pan-Malayan Islamic Party		301,187	14.64	9	0	9	–4
United Democratic Party		88,223	4.29	1	0	1	New
People's Progressive Party		69,898	3.40	2	0	2	–2
People's Action Party		42,130	2.05	1	12	13	New
Parti Negara		7,319	0.36	0	0	0	–1
United Sabah National Organisation					6	6	New
Sarawak Heritage Party					6	6	New
United National Kadazan Organisation					5	5	New
Sarawak People's Front					5	5	New
Sabah Chinese Association					4	4	New
Sarawak National Party					4	4	New
Sarawak Chinese Association					3	3	New
Sarawak United Peoples' Party					3	3	New
Parti Negara Sarawak					3	3	New
Barisan Sosialis					3	3	New
United Pasok Momogun Organisation					1	1	New
Independents		13,509	0.66	0	0	0	–3
Total		2,057,504	100.00	104	55	159	+55
Valid votes		2,057,504	95.85				
Invalid/blank votes		89,104	4.15				
Total votes		2,146,608	100.00				
Registered voters/turnout		2,720,100	78.92				
Source: Nohlen et al., Singapore Elections, Singapore Elections

Registered voters in above table reflects the total number of voters for contested constituencies. Total Electorate including two uncontested constituencies of Muar Selatan and Johore Tenggara is 2763077

=== By state ===
==== Johore ====
Party or alliance		Votes	%	Seats	+/–
Alliance Party	United Malays National Organisation	123,911	47.94	11	0
Alliance Party	Malaysian Chinese Association	61,502	23.80	5	0
Alliance Party	Total	185,413	71.74	16	0
Malayan Peoples'; Socialist Front	Labour Party of Malaya	50,568	19.56	0	0
Malayan Peoples'; Socialist Front	Parti Ra'ayat	6,710	2.60	0	0
Malayan Peoples'; Socialist Front	Total	57,278	22.16	0	0
United Democratic Party		9,642	3.73	0	New
Pan-Malayan Islamic Party		3,673	1.42	0	0
People's Action Party		2,456	0.95	0	New
Total		258,462	100.00	16	0
Valid votes		258,462	95.57		
Invalid/blank votes		11,981	4.43		
Total votes		270,443	100.00		
Registered voters/turnout		334,359	80.88		

Above registered voter count represent the constituencies that were contested. Total electorate of Johor is 377336 (inclusive of two uncontested seats of Muar Selatan and Johore Tenggara)

==== Kedah ====
Party or alliance		Votes	%	Seats	+/–
Alliance Party	United Malays National Organisation	139,169	56.46	10	0
Alliance Party	Malaysian Chinese Association	29,826	12.10	2	0
Alliance Party	Total	168,995	68.56	12	0
Pan-Malayan Islamic Party		61,861	25.10	0	0
Malayan Peoples'; Socialist Front	Labour Party of Malaya	10,012	4.06	0	0
Malayan Peoples'; Socialist Front	Parti Ra'ayat	1,782	0.72	0	0
Malayan Peoples'; Socialist Front	Total	11,794	4.78	0	0
United Democratic Party		3,849	1.56	0	New
Total		246,499	100.00	12	0
Valid votes		246,499	95.74		
Invalid/blank votes		10,973	4.26		
Total votes		257,472	100.00		
Registered voters/turnout		336,858	76.43		

==== Kelantan ====
Party or alliance		Votes	%	Seats	+/–
Pan-Malayan Islamic Party		118,770	56.86	8	-1
Alliance Party	United Malays National Organisation	89,710	42.95	2	+1
Malayan Peoples' Socialist Front	Parti Ra'ayat	414	0.20	0	New
Total		208,894	100.00	10	0
Valid votes		208,894	95.92		
Invalid/blank votes		8,875	4.08		
Total votes		217,769	100.00		
Registered voters/turnout		271,731	80.14		

==== Malacca ====
Party or alliance		Votes	%	Seats	+/–
Alliance Party	United Malays National Organisation	35,541	34.64	2	0
Alliance Party	Malaysian Chinese Association	32,357	31.54	2	+1
Alliance Party	Total	67,898	66.18	4	+1
Malayan Peoples'; Socialist Front	Parti Ra'ayat	16,820	16.39	0	0
Malayan Peoples'; Socialist Front	Labour Party of Malaya	10,658	10.39	0	0
Malayan Peoples'; Socialist Front	Total	27,478	26.78	0	0
Pan-Malayan Islamic Party		3,759	3.66	0	0
People's Action Party		3,461	3.37	0	New
Total		102,596	100.00	4	0
Valid votes		102,596	96.98		
Invalid/blank votes		3,192	3.02		
Total votes		105,788	100.00		
Registered voters/turnout		125,585	84.24		

==== Negri Sembilan ====
Party or alliance		Votes	%	Seats	+/–
Alliance Party	United Malays National Organisation	41,177	35.45	3	0
Alliance Party	Malaysian Chinese Association	19,767	17.02	2	0
Alliance Party	Malaysian Indian Congress	7,911	6.81	1	0
Alliance Party	Total	68,855	59.27	6	0
Malayan Peoples'; Socialist Front	Labour Party of Malaya	19,433	16.73	0	0
Malayan Peoples'; Socialist Front	Parti Ra'ayat	7,051	6.07	0	0
Malayan Peoples'; Socialist Front	Total	26,484	22.80	0	0
United Democratic Party		11,487	9.89	0	New
People's Action Party		5,410	4.66	0	New
People's Progressive Party		1,349	1.16	0	0
Independents		2,578	2.22	0	0
Total		116,163	100.00	6	0
Valid votes		116,163	95.44		
Invalid/blank votes		5,548	4.56		
Total votes		121,711	100.00		
Registered voters/turnout		152,114	80.01		

==== Pahang ====
Party or alliance		Votes	%	Seats	+/–
Alliance Party	United Malays National Organisation	61,491	58.81	5	0
Alliance Party	Malaysian Chinese Association	12,832	12.27	1	0
Alliance Party	Total	74,323	71.08	6	0
Malayan Peoples' Socialist Front	Labour Party of Malaya	6,686	6.39	–	–
Malayan Peoples' Socialist Front	Parti Ra'ayat	12,310	11.77	0	0
Malayan Peoples' Socialist Front	Total	18,996	18.17	0	0
Pan-Malayan Islamic Party		11,237	10.75	0	0
Total		104,556	100.00	6	0
Valid votes		104,556	95.13		
Invalid/blank votes		5,358	4.87		
Total votes		109,914	100.00		
Registered voters/turnout		141,592	77.63		

==== Penang ====
Party or alliance		Votes	%	Seats	+/–
Alliance Party	United Malays National Organisation	57,615	28.02	4	+1
Alliance Party	Malaysian Chinese Association	39,589	19.25	2	0
Alliance Party	Total	97,204	47.27	6	+1
Malayan Peoples'; Socialist Front	Labour Party of Malaya	42,574	20.70	1	-2
Malayan Peoples'; Socialist Front	Parti Ra'ayat	22,412	10.90	0	0
Malayan Peoples'; Socialist Front	Total	64,986	31.60	1	-2
United Democratic Party		37,151	18.07	1	New
Pan-Malayan Islamic Party		5,527	2.69	0	0
People's Action Party		778	0.38	0	New
Total		205,646	100.00	8	0
Valid votes		205,646	97.21		
Invalid/blank votes		5,902	2.79		
Total votes		211,548	100.00		
Registered voters/turnout		253,455	83.47		

==== Perak ====
Party or alliance		Votes	%	Seats	+/–
Alliance Party	United Malays National Organisation	99,122	24.79	9	0
Alliance Party	Malaysian Chinese Association	113,164	28.31	8	+3
Alliance Party	Malaysian Indian Congress	9,855	2.47	1	0
Alliance Party	Total	222,141	55.57	18	+3
People's Progressive Party		66,330	16.59	2	-2
Pan-Malayan Islamic Party		41,941	10.49	0	0
Malayan Peoples' Socialist Front	Labour Party of Malaya	18,059	4.52	0	0
Malayan Peoples' Socialist Front	Parti Ra'ayat	14,280	3.57	0	0
Malayan Peoples' Socialist Front	Total	32,339	8.09	–	–
United Democratic Party		26,094	6.53	0	New
Independents		10,931	2.73	0	-1
Total		399,776	100.00	20	0
Valid votes		399,776	95.84		
Invalid/blank votes		17,344	4.16		
Total votes		417,120	100.00		
Registered voters/turnout		524,487	79.53		

==== Perlis ====
Party or alliance		Votes	%	Seats	+/–
Alliance Party	United Malays National Organisation	23,007	63.25	2	0
Pan-Malayan Islamic Party		13,369	36.75	0	0
Total		36,376	100.00	2	0
Valid votes		36,376	95.88		
Invalid/blank votes		1,564	4.12		
Total votes		37,940	100.00		
Registered voters/turnout		46,491	81.61		

==== Selangor ====
Party or alliance		Votes	%	Seats	+/–
Alliance Party	Malaysian Chinese Association	68,932	25.44	5	+2
Alliance Party	United Malays National Organisation	63,043	23.26	6	+1
Alliance Party	Malaysian Indian Congress	14,027	5.18	1	0
Alliance Party	Total	146,002	53.88	12	+3
Malayan Peoples'; Socialist Front	Labour Party of Malaya	54,556	20.13	1	–2
Malayan Peoples'; Socialist Front	Parti Ra'ayat	16,347	6.03	0	–2
Malayan Peoples'; Socialist Front	Parti Perhimpunan Kebangsaan	15,307	5.65	0	0
Malayan Peoples'; Socialist Front	Total	86,210	31.81	1	–4
People's Action Party		30,025	11.08	1	New
Pan-Malayan Islamic Party		6,528	2.41	0	0
People's Progressive Party		2,219	0.82	0	0
Total		270,984	100.00	14	0
Valid votes		270,984	95.23		
Invalid/blank votes		13,581	4.77		
Total votes		284,565	100.00		
Registered voters/turnout		388,211	73.30		

==== Terrengganu ====
Party or alliance		Votes	%	Seats	+/–
Alliance Party	United Malays National Organisation	60,792	56.52	5	+4
Pan-Malayan Islamic Party		34,522	32.10	1	-3
Parti Negara		7,319	6.81	0	-1
Malayan Peoples' Socialist Front	Parti Ra'ayat	4,919	4.57	0	0
Total		107,552	100.00	6	0
Valid votes		107,552	95.74		
Invalid/blank votes		4,786	4.26		
Total votes		112,338	100.00		
Registered voters/turnout		145,217	77.36		

== See also ==
- 1964 Malaysian state elections
