= Alliance Party (Malaysia) =

Former ruling coalition in Malaysia

- Malay name: Parti Perikatan
- Abbreviation: Alliance
- Founder: Tunku Abdul Rahman (UMNO); Tan Cheng Lock (MCA); V.T. Sambanthan (MIC)
- Founded: 14 January 1952; 74 years ago
- Legalised: 30 October 1957; 68 years ago
- Dissolved: 1974; 52 years ago 1976; 50 years ago (in Sabah)
- Succeeded by: Barisan Nasional
- Headquarters: Kuala Lumpur
- Membership: Traditional parties: United Malays National Organisation (UMNO); Malaysian Chinese Association (MCA); Malaysian Indian Congress (MIC)
- Ideology: Social conservatism National liberalism Anti-communism; Multiracialism
- Political position: Centre-right to right-wing
- Colours: Royal blue; Sky white

The Alliance Party (Malay: Parti Perikatan) was a political coalition in Malaysia. The Alliance Party, whose membership comprised the ethnic parties of the United Malays National Organisation (UMNO), the Malaysian Chinese Association (MCA) and the Malaysian Indian Congress (MIC), was informally founded in 1952 before being formally registered as a political organisation in 1957 after its victory in the 1955 Malayan general election. It was the ruling coalition of Malaya from 1957 to 1963, and Malaysia from 1963 to 1974. The coalition became known as the Barisan Nasional (BN) that year, which ruled Malaysia for another 44 years until 2018.

== History ==
=== Origin ===
The Alliance Party had its origin in an ad hoc and temporary electoral arrangement set up between the local branches of UMNO and MCA to contest the Kuala Lumpur municipal election in 1952. The UMNO–MCA candidates won in 9 of the 12 seats contested, beating the non-communal Independence of Malaya Party (IMP) which won 2 seats and Selangor Labour Party which won none. Their success in this election led to firmer association between the two parties and further successes in other municipal elections that the UMNO–MCA alliance contested (the only state the two parties did not contest together was Penang where UMNO was allied with the Muslim League). In 1954, the alliance was joined by MIC that previously supported IMP. Although for a time other parties were also associated with the Alliance Party, these three parties (UMNO, MCA, MIC) remained the core of the coalition until 1971.

In 1955, in the first general election for the Federal Legislative Council in what was then the British protectorate of the Federation of Malaya, the UMNO–MCA–MIC Alliance successfully gained the great majority of seats available for contest, winning 51 of the 52 seats contested with a vote of 81.7%. It formally registered as a political organisation on 30 October 1957.

=== 1957–1972 ===
The Alliance played an important role in negotiating the transition from British rule to independence, and facilitating the preparation of its constitution. After the Malaya had gained independence on 31 August 1957, the General Election was held in 1959. The Alliance won 51.5% of the popular vote and 74 of the 104 seats contested, defeating the Pan Malayan Islamic Party (PMIP, 21.2%) and the Socialist Front coalition (13%).

The Alliance was also credited with securing the formation of the Federation of Malaysia when the Crown Colony of North Borneo (Sabah), the Crown Colony of Sarawak, and State of Singapore joined on 16 September 1963. After Malaysia came into being, the Alliance Party of the Malay Peninsula became closely associated with other alliance parties in Sabah and Sarawak.

In the 1964 general election, boosted by the formation of Malaysia and the confrontation with Indonesia, the Alliance Party was even more successful, winning a majority (58.4%) of the votes and securing 89 of the 104 seats contested. The election could be seen as a referendum on how the Alliance handled the Indonesian confrontation, and PMIP which had stronger Indonesian ties therefore lost ground. The Alliance received strong support among rural Malays (apart from the east coast of Malaysia where support for PMIP was still significant), while other opposition parties had support among the Chinese urban population.

In the 1969 general election, although the Alliance Party won the most seats, it garnered less than half the popular vote due to strong challenges from the opposition parties, in particular the newly formed Democratic Action Party and Gerakan. PMIP also gained support at the expense of UMNO but the number of seats gained was smaller. The unease and anxiety after the election led to the May 13 riots, and the declaration of a state of emergency. After the Malaysian Parliament reconvened in 1971, negotiations began with former opposition parties such as Gerakan and People's Progressive Party, both of which joined the Alliance in 1972, quickly followed by PMIP. In 1974, the Alliance Party was formally replaced by Barisan Nasional, a coalition of 9 parties, which registered in June to contest the 1974 general election.

== Component parties ==
- United Malays National Organisation (UMNO) (1952–1974)
- Malaysian Chinese Association (MCA) (1952–1974)
- Malaysian Indian Congress (MIC) (1954–1974)
- People's Progressive Party (PPP) (1954–1955)
- Malayan Radical Party (1954–1959)
- Muslim League (1954–1963)

=== Allied parties ===
- Sarawak United Peoples' Party (SUPP) (1970–1973)
- Sarawak Native Heritage Party (PESAKA) (1970–1973)
- People's Progressive Party (PPP) (1972–1974)
- Parti Gerakan Rakyat Malaysia (Gerakan) (1972–1974)
- Pan-Malaysian Islamic Party (PMIP) (1972–1974)

=== Associated alliances ===
Sabah Alliance

- United National Kadazan Organisation (UNKO) (1963–1964)
- United Pasokmomogun Kadazan Organisation (UPKO) (1964–1967)
- United Sabah National Organisation (USNO) (1963–1976)
- Sabah Chinese Association (SCA) (1963–1976)
- Sabah Indian Congress (SIC) (1963–1976)

Sabah Alliance was a component party of Barisan Nasional from 1974 to several months before 1976 Sabah election. In that state election, Sabah Alliance clashed with the federal BN-supported BERJAYA party. It disbanded after the election. USNO and BERJAYA joined Barisan Nasional after Double-Six Accident.

Sarawak Alliance

- Sarawak National Party (SNAP) (1962–1966)
- Sarawak Chinese Association (SCA) (1962–1973)
- Sarawak Nation Party (PANAS) (1962–1963, 1965–1967)
- Sarawak Native People's Front (BARJASA) (1962–1967)
- Sarawak Native Heritage Party (PESAKA) (1962–1969)
- Native People's Party (BUMIPUTERA) (1967–1973)

Singapore Alliance (1963–1965)

- United Malays National Organisation (UMNO)
- Malaysian Chinese Association (MCA)
- Malaysian Indian Congress (MIC)
- Singapore People's Alliance (SPA)

== Elected representatives ==
- List of Malayan State and Settlement Council Representatives (1954–59)
- Members of the Federal Legislative Council (1955–59)
- Members of the Dewan Rakyat, 1st Malayan Parliament
- List of Malaysian State Assembly Representatives (1959–64)
- Members of the Dewan Rakyat, 2nd Malaysian Parliament
- List of Malaysian State Assembly Representatives (1964–69)
- Members of the Dewan Rakyat, 3rd Malaysian Parliament
- List of Malaysian State Assembly Representatives (1969–74)

== Government offices ==
=== State governments ===
- Sabah (1963–1976)
- Pahang (1957–1973)
- Sarawak (1963–1973)
- Johor (1957–1973)
- Malacca (1957–1973)
- Perak (1957–1973)
- Selangor (1957–1973)
- Negeri Sembilan (1957–1973)
- Perlis (1957–1973)
- Kedah (1957–1973)
- Terengganu (1957–1959, 1961–1973)
- Penang (1957–1969, 1970–1973)
- Kelantan (1957–1959, 1970–1973)

Note: bold as Menteri Besar/Chief Minister, italic as junior partner

== Election results ==
=== General election results ===
Election	Total seats won	Seats contested	Total votes	Share of votes	Outcome of election	Election leader
1955	51 / 52	52	818,013	81.7%	▲51 seats; Governing coalition	Tunku Abdul Rahman
1959	74 / 104	104	800,944	51.8%	▲23 seats; Governing coalition	Tunku Abdul Rahman
1964	89 / 159	159	1,204,340	58.4%	▲15 seats; Governing coalition	Tunku Abdul Rahman
1969	77 / 144	144	1,063,238	48.4%	▼12 seats; Governing coalition	Tunku Abdul Rahman

=== State election results ===
State election	State Legislative Assembly											
State election	Perlis State Legislative Assembly	Kedah State Legislative Assembly	Kelantan State Legislative Assembly	Terengganu State Legislative Assembly	Penang State Legislative Assembly	Perak State Legislative Assembly	Pahang State Legislative Assembly	Selangor State Legislative Assembly	Negeri Sembilan State Legislative Assembly	Malacca State Legislative Assembly	Johor State Legislative Assembly	Total won / Total contested
2/3 majority	2 / 3	2 / 3	2 / 3	2 / 3	2 / 3	2 / 3	2 / 3	2 / 3	2 / 3	2 / 3	2 / 3	
1959	12 / 12	24 / 24	2 / 30	7 / 24	17 / 24	31 / 40	23 / 24	23 / 28	20 / 24	20 / 20	28 / 32	
1964	11 / 12	24 / 24	9 / 30	21 / 24	18 / 24	35 / 40	24 / 24	24 / 28	24 / 24	18 / 20	32 / 32	
1969	11 / 12	14 / 24	11 / 30	13 / 24	4 / 24	19 / 40	20 / 24	14 / 28	16 / 24	15 / 20	30 / 32	

== See also ==
- Barisan Nasional
