= Gelang Patah (disambiguation) =

Gelang Patah or Glang Patah may refer to:

- Gelang Patah
- Gelang Patah (federal constituency), renamed to Iskandar Puteri (federal constituency)
- Gelang Patah (state constituency), former, List of Malaysian State Assembly Representatives (1990–1995)
