= Leader of the Opposition (Malaysia) =

Parliamentary position in Malaysia

- Ketua Pembangkang کتوا ڤمبڠکڠ

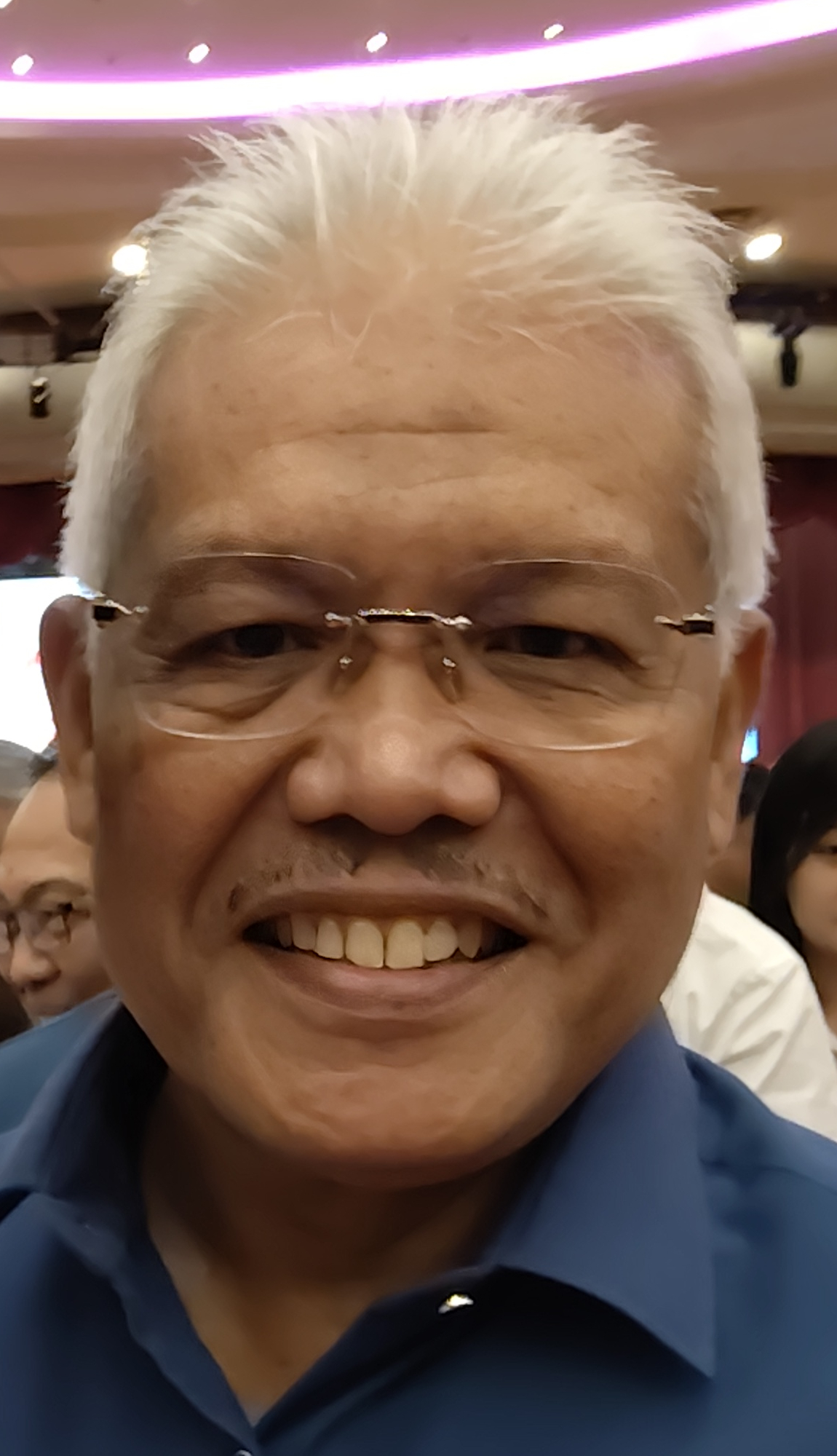
- Incumbent; Hamzah Zainuddin since 18 June 2026
- Style: Yang Berhormat (The Honourable)
- Member of: House of Representatives
- Reports to: Parliament
- Appointer: Dewan Rakyat
- Term length: 5 years or less, renewable once (while commanding the confidence of the lower house of Parliament with General Elections held no more than five years apart) By convention, is held by the leader of the largest political party in the Dewan Rakyat that is not in government
- Inaugural holder: Burhanuddin al-Helmy
- Formation: 1959; 67 years ago

The leader of the opposition (Malay: Ketua Pembangkang; Jawi: کتوا ڤمبڠکڠ) in Malaysian Federal Politics is a Member of Parliament in the Dewan Rakyat (House of Representatives). The leader of the opposition is, by convention, the leader of the largest political party in the Dewan Rakyat that is not in government.

When in the Dewan Rakyat, the leader of the opposition sits on the left-hand side of the centre table, in front of the opposition and opposite the prime minister. The Opposition Leader is elected by the minority party of the House according to its rules. A new Opposition Leader may be elected when the incumbent dies, resigns, or is challenged for the leadership.

Malaysia is a constitutional monarchy with a parliamentary system and is based on the Westminster model. The Opposition is an important component of the Westminster system, with the opposition directing criticism at the Government's policies and programs, proposing alternative budgets and legislations, give close attention to all proposed legislation and attempts to defeat and replace the Government. The Opposition is therefore known as the 'government in waiting' and it is a formal part of the parliamentary system.

Since November 2022, PN has been the largest Malaysian Opposition. Previously, the longest-serving Opposition Leader had been Lim Kit Siang, who served for a total of 28 years (from 1975-1999 and then from 2004-2008).

== List of leaders of the opposition of Malaysia ==
Colour key' (for political parties and coalitions):
PMIP/PAS LPM DAP SNAP PKR PH BN PN

#	Portrait	Leader of the Opposition	Political party	Term of office			Refs
#	Portrait	Leader of the Opposition	Political party	Took office	Left office	Time in office	Refs
1.		Dr. Burhanuddin al-Helmy (1911–1969); MP for Besut	PMIP	1959	1964	5 years	
2		Dr. Tan Chee Khoon (1919–1996); MP for Batu	SF (LPM)	18 May 1964	10 January 1966	4 years, 307 days	
2		Dr. Tan Chee Khoon (1919–1996); MP for Batu	LPM	10 January 1966	28 May 1968	4 years, 307 days	
2		Dr. Tan Chee Khoon (1919–1996); MP for Batu	Gerakan	28 May 1968	20 March 1969	4 years, 307 days	
Parliament suspended				1969	1971		
3.		Mohamed Asri Muda (1923–1992); MP for Pasir Puteh	PMIP	1971	1973	2 years	
4.		Lim Kit Siang (b.1941); MP for Bandar Malacca	DAP	30 January 1973	31 July 1974	1 year, 183 days	
5.		Dato'; James Wong Kim Min (1922–2011); MP for Miri-Subis	SNAP	24 August 1974	30 October 1974	68 days	
6.		Edmund Langgu Anak Saga (b.1936); MP for Saratok	SNAP	4 November 1974	4 November 1975	1 year, 0 days	
7.		Lim Kit Siang (b.1941); MP for Kota Melaka (1975-1978); MP for Petaling (1978–1982); MP for Kota Melaka (1982-1986); MP for Tanjong (1986–1999)	DAP	5 November 1975	12 June 1978	24 years, 6 days	
7.		Lim Kit Siang (b.1941); MP for Kota Melaka (1975-1978); MP for Petaling (1978–1982); MP for Kota Melaka (1982-1986); MP for Tanjong (1986–1999)	DAP	10 October 1978	29 March 1982	24 years, 6 days	
7.		Lim Kit Siang (b.1941); MP for Kota Melaka (1975-1978); MP for Petaling (1978–1982); MP for Kota Melaka (1982-1986); MP for Tanjong (1986–1999)	DAP	12 October 1982	19 July 1986	24 years, 6 days	
7.		Lim Kit Siang (b.1941); MP for Kota Melaka (1975-1978); MP for Petaling (1978–1982); MP for Kota Melaka (1982-1986); MP for Tanjong (1986–1999)	DAP	8 October 1986	4 October 1990	24 years, 6 days	
7.		Lim Kit Siang (b.1941); MP for Kota Melaka (1975-1978); MP for Petaling (1978–1982); MP for Kota Melaka (1982-1986); MP for Tanjong (1986–1999)	GR (DAP)	10 December 1990	6 April 1995	24 years, 6 days	
7.		Lim Kit Siang (b.1941); MP for Kota Melaka (1975-1978); MP for Petaling (1978–1982); MP for Kota Melaka (1982-1986); MP for Tanjong (1986–1999)	DAP	15 June 1995	10 November 1999	24 years, 6 days	
8.		Dato'; Fadzil Noor (1937–2002); MP for Pendang	BA (PAS)	20 December 1999	23 June 2002	2 years, 186 days	
9.		Dato' Seri; Abdul Hadi Awang (b.1947); MP for Marang	BA (PAS)	9 September 2002	4 March 2004	1 year, 178 days	
10.		Lim Kit Siang (b. 1941); MP for Ipoh Timor	DAP	19 May 2004	13 February 2008	3 years, 271 days	
11.		Dato' Seri; Wan Azizah Wan Ismail (b. 1952); MP for Permatang Pauh	PR (PKR)	30 April 2008	28 August 2008	121 days	
12.		Dato' Seri; Anwar Ibrahim (b.1947); MP for Permatang Pauh	PR (PKR)	28 August 2008	3 April 2013	6 years, 201 days	
12.		Dato' Seri; Anwar Ibrahim (b.1947); MP for Permatang Pauh	PR (PKR)	26 June 2013	16 March 2015	6 years, 201 days	
13.		Dato' Seri; Wan Azizah Wan Ismail (b.1952); MP for Permatang Pauh	PH (PKR)	18 May 2015	7 April 2018	2 years, 325 days	
14.		Dato' Seri; Ahmad Zahid Hamidi (b.1953); MP for Bagan Datuk	BN (UMNO)	18 July 2018	12 March 2019	238 days	
15.		Dato' Sri; Ismail Sabri Yaakob (b.1960); MP for Bera	BN (UMNO)	12 March 2019	24 February 2020	350 days	
16.		Dato' Seri; Anwar Ibrahim (b.1947); MP for Port Dickson	PH (PKR)	13 July 2020	24 November 2022	2 years, 135 days	
17.		Dato' Seri; Hamzah Zainudin (b.1957); MP for Larut	PN (BERSATU)	10 December 2022	13 February 2026	3 years, 66 days	
17.		Dato' Seri; Hamzah Zainudin (b.1957); MP for Larut	Independent	13 February 2026	20 May 2026	97 days	
18.		Dato' Seri; Ahmad Samsuri Mokhtar (born 1970); MP for Kemaman	PN (PAS)	21 May 2026	10 June 2026	21 days	
19.		Dato' Seri; Hamzah Zainudin (b.1957); MP for Larut	PN (WAWASAN)	18 June 2026	Incumbent	128 days	
