= Dzulkefly Ahmad (Johor politician) =

Malaysian politician

- ذوالكفل بن أحمد

Member of the Johor State Executive Council (Housing and Rural Development : 16 May 2018–21 April 2019) (Housing, Communication and Multimedia : 22 April 2019–27 February 2020)
- In office 16 May 2018 – 27 February 2020
- Monarch: Ibrahim Iskandar
- Menteri Besar: Osman Sapian; Sahruddin Jamal
- Preceded by: Md Jais Sarday (Housing); Hasni Mohammad (Rural Development)
- Succeeded by: Ayub Jamil (Housing); Mazlan Bujang (Communication and Multimedia)
- Constituency: Kota Iskandar

Member of the Johor State Legislative Assembly for Kota Iskandar
- In office 9 May 2018 – 12 March 2022
- Preceded by: Zaini Abu Bakar (BN–UMNO)
- Succeeded by: Pandak Ahmad (BN–UMNO)
- Majority: 14,543 (2018)

Personal details
- Born: Dzulkefly bin Ahmad; 1 August 1965 (age 60) Johor, Malaysia
- Party: National Trust Party (AMANAH)
- Other political affiliations: Pakatan Harapan (PH)
- Occupation: Politician

Dzulkefly bin Ahmad (born 1 August 1965) is a Malaysian politician who served as Member of the Johor State Executive Council (EXCO) in the Pakatan Harapan (PH) state administration under former Menteris Besar Osman Sapian and Sahruddin Jamal from May 2018 to the collapse of the PH state administration in February 2020 and Member of the Johor State Legislative Assembly (MLA) for Kota Iskandar from May 2018 to March 2022. He is a member of the National Trust Party (AMANAH), a component party of the PH coalition.

== Election results ==
Johor State Legislative Assembly
Year	Constituency	Candidate	Votes	Pct	Opponent(s)	Votes	Pct	Ballots cast	Majority	Turnout%
2018	N49 Kota Iskandar	Dzulkefly Ahmad (AMANAH)	33,455	58.35%	Mohammad Khairi Abdul A. Malik (UMNO)	18,912	32.99%	58,335	14,543	86.60%
2018	N49 Kota Iskandar	Dzulkefly Ahmad (AMANAH)	33,455	58.35%	Sallehuddin Mohd Dahiran (PAS)	4,966	8.66%	58,335	14,543	86.60%
2022	N49 Kota Iskandar	Dzulkefly Ahmad (AMANAH)	18,773	33.10%	Pandak Ahmad (UMNO)	23,133	40.79%	56,714	4,360	50.26%
2022	N49 Kota Iskandar	Dzulkefly Ahmad (AMANAH)	18,773	33.10%	Shamsuddin Ismail (BERSATU)	12,503	22.05%	56,714	4,360	50.26%
2022	N49 Kota Iskandar	Dzulkefly Ahmad (AMANAH)	18,773	33.10%	Zaini Abu Bakar (PEJUANG)	1,308	2.31%	56,714	4,360	50.26%
2022	N49 Kota Iskandar	Dzulkefly Ahmad (AMANAH)	18,773	33.10%	Arangkannal Rajoo (PSM)	997	1.76%	56,714	4,360	50.26%
