= Parti Keluarga Malaysia =

Upcoming political party in Malaysia

Parti Keluarga Malaysia is an upcoming political party in Malaysia. The party is scheduled to be led by the Leader of the Opposition, Hamzah Zainudin.

The party's founder, Khairi Jaya, said there has been a discussion involving former BERSATU members.
