= Tan Seng Giaw =

Malaysian politician

Dr. Tan Seng Giaw
- 陈胜尧

Member of the Malaysian Parliament for Kepong
- In office 1982 – 9 May 2018
- Preceded by: Tan Tiong Hong (BN–Gerakan)
- Succeeded by: Lim Lip Eng (PH–DAP)
- Majority: 1,205 (1982); 16,513 (1986); 22,352 (1990); 5,022 (1995); 1,766 (1999); 1,854 (2004); 23,848 (2008); 40,307 (2013)

Member of the Selangor State Legislative Assembly for Kajang
- In office 1990–1995
- Preceded by: Chan Kok Kit (GR–DAP)
- Succeeded by: Choong Tow Chong (BN–MCA)
- Majority: 3,911 (1990)

Member of the Selangor State Legislative Assembly for Bandar Kelang/Klang Bandar
- In office 1982–1990
- Preceded by: Tong Kok Mau (BN–MCA)
- Succeeded by: Chua Kow Eng (GR–DAP)
- Majority: 5,245 (1982); 6,281 (1986)

Personal details
- Born: Tan Seng Giaw @ Tan Chun Tin; 26 May 1942 (age 84) Kota Bharu, Kelantan, Japanese occupation of Malaya
- Citizenship: Malaysian
- Party: Democratic Action Party (DAP) (1979–); Malaysian Social Justice Party (Pekemas) (1976–1979)
- Other political affiliations: Pakatan Harapan (PH) (2015–); Pakatan Rakyat (PR) (2008–2015); Barisan Alternatif (BA) (1999–2004); Gagasan Rakyat (GR) (1990–1996)
- Spouse: Oon Hong Geok (温凤玉)
- Children: 2
- Education: University of Leeds
- Occupation: Politician
- Website: tansenggiaw.blogspot.com

Tan Seng Giaw (simplified Chinese: 陈胜尧; traditional Chinese: 陳勝堯; pinyin: Chén Shèngyáo; born 26 May 1942) is a veteran Malaysian from the Democratic Action Party (DAP).

== Background ==
He was born on 26 May 1942 in Kota Bharu, Kelantan. After attending Primary and High School in Kelantan and Penang respectively, he furthered his education at Plymouth College and Leeds University, England. His multi-cultural academic and social background has resulted in Seng Giaw being fluent in Mandarin, English, Bahasa Malaysia, and competent in the writing of Malay in the Jawi script. Seng Giaw's academic qualifications include a M.B.Ch. B. (Leeds), D. Obs. R.C.O.G, M.R.C.P (UK) and finally an M.D. honours (Leeds) in 1976.

An active participant in student activities, he represented the Leeds Medical School on the British Medical Student's Association for five years, and was a founding member of the Chinese Society of the University of Leeds, where he held the office of Society President during 1965–66. His social activities include the office of Pengerusi Kehormat of Persatuan Murid-murid Tua, Chung Ling for the states of Selangor, Negeri Sembilan, Pahang and Kuala Lumpur.

Over the years, Tan has gathered a wide portfolio of medical experience, having worked at various hospitals (both international and local), private practice clinics and a short period in the Royal Malaysian Army. Tan is working as a Specialist Dermatologist at the Chinese Maternity Hospital Medical Centre.

In 1972, Tan married Oon Hong Geok, a paediatrician and has two daughters. His wife used to be active in the political scene and represented Taman Aman, Petaling Jaya as a state assemblywoman.

== Political career ==
Tan's political involvement began in 1976, during which he served the people of Kepong on behalf of Dr. Tan Chee Khoon. He was the Democratic Action Party's National Vice-chairman and Member of Parliament for the constituency of Kepong leading up to the 2018 general election (GE14).

Despite having been successful elected as the Member of Parliament (MP) of Kepong for eight consecutive terms (from 1982 to 2018), Tan was dropped as a candidate of choice for the party in GE14. This was amid the rumours nearing the GE14, and Tan's action who went on the offensive by declaring 'he will not back down' and began releasing a series of press statements including a veiled attack on DAP party leaders through an interview with Malaysian Chinese Association (MCA)'s controlled newspaper, The Star as well as UMNO controlled, New Straits Times which labeled them as 'not as honest as the late Tan Chee Koon'.

== Election results ==
Selangor State Legislative Assembly
Year	Constituency	Candidate	Votes	Pct	Opponent(s)	Votes	Pct	Ballots cast	Majority	Turnout
1982	N23 Bandar Kelang	Tan Seng Giaw (DAP)	18,075	58.49%	Tong Kok Mau (MCA)	12,830	41.51%	31,351	5,245	81.22%
1986	N34 Klang Bandar	Tan Seng Giaw (DAP)	13,223	61.77%	Goon Swee Fook (MCA)	6,942	32.43%	21,803	6,281	71.88%
1986	N34 Klang Bandar	Tan Seng Giaw (DAP)	13,223	61.77%	Yeoh Lai Seng (NASMA)	927	4.33%	21,803	6,281	71.88%
1986	N34 Klang Bandar	Tan Seng Giaw (DAP)	13,223	61.77%	Yeoh Poh San (SDP)	314	1.47%	21,803	6,281	71.88%
1990	N24 Kajang	Tan Seng Giaw (DAP)	10,138	61.95%	Khoo Chai Hong (MCA)	6,227	38.05%	16,856	3,911	75.99%

Parliament of Malaysia
Year	Constituency	Candidate	Votes	Pct	Opponent(s)	Votes	Pct	Ballots cast	Majority	Turnout
1978	P084 Kepong	Tan Seng Giaw (PEKEMAS)	17,827	36.95%	Tan Tiong Hong (Gerakan)	20,055	41.57%	48,606	2,228	76.30%
1978	P084 Kepong	Tan Seng Giaw (PEKEMAS)	17,827	36.95%	Khoo Chin Tow (DAP)	9,971	20.67%	48,606	2,228	76.30%
1978	P084 Kepong	Tan Seng Giaw (PEKEMAS)	17,827	36.95%	Kanda (IND)	390	0.81%	48,606	2,228	76.30%
1982	P084 Kepong	Tan Seng Giaw (DAP)	29,368	50.51%	Kerk Choo Ting (Gerakan)	28,163	48.44%	59,465	1,205	76.94%
1982	P084 Kepong	Tan Seng Giaw (DAP)	29,368	50.51%	Ishak Ibrahim (IND)	613	1.05%	59,465	1,205	76.94%
1986	P096 Kepong	Tan Seng Giaw (DAP)	33,049	64.81%	Lum Weng Keong (Gerakan)	16,536	32.43%	51,476	16,513	71.73%
1986	P096 Kepong	Tan Seng Giaw (DAP)	33,049	64.81%	Wong Kim Lin (NASMA)	1,405	2.76%	51,476	16,513	71.73%
1990	P096 Kepong	Tan Seng Giaw (DAP)	38,323	70.58%	Lim Kim Hoe (Gerakan)	15,971	29.42%	54,679	22,352	71.23%
1995	P103 Kepong	Tan Seng Giaw (DAP)	25,075	55.56%	Tan Poh Eng (Gerakan)	20,053	44.44%	45,454	5,022	75.62%
1999	P103 Kepong	Tan Seng Giaw (DAP)	25,085	50.77%	Ma Woei Chyi (Gerakan)	23,319	47.20%	49,730	1,766	76.55%
1999	P103 Kepong	Tan Seng Giaw (DAP)	25,085	50.77%	Manoharan Letchumanan (IND)	1,003	2.03%	49,730	1,766	76.55%
2004	P114 Kepong	Tan Seng Giaw (DAP)	23,282	52.07%	Ma Woei Chyi (Gerakan)	21,428	47.93%	44,956	1,854	74.59%
2008	P114 Kepong	Tan Seng Giaw (DAP)	35,552	75.23%	Lau Hoi Keong (Gerakan)	11,704	24.77%	47,508	23,848	78.17%
2013	P114 Kepong	Tan Seng Giaw (DAP)	47,837	82.30%	Chandrakumanan Arumugam (PPP)	7,530	12.96%	58,585	40,307	86.11%
2013	P114 Kepong	Tan Seng Giaw (DAP)	47,837	82.30%	Yee Poh Ping (IND)	2,757	4.74%	58,585	40,307	86.11%
