= Pandak Ahmad =

Malaysian politician

Yang Berhormat Datuk Haji Pandak Ahmad MLA DPSM PPN
- ڤندق أحمد

Member of the Johor State Legislative Assembly for Kota Iskandar
- Incumbent
- Assumed office 2022
- Preceded by: Dzulkefly Ahmad

Personal details
- Born: Pandak bin Ahmad
- Citizenship: Malaysian
- Party: UMNO
- Other political affiliations: Barisan Nasional
- Occupation: Politician

Pandak bin Ahmad is a Malaysian politician from UMNO. He has served as the Member of the Johor State Legislative Assembly for Kota Iskandar since 2022. He is also the Deputy Chief of UMNO Iskandar Puteri division.

== Election results ==
Johor State Legislative Assembly
Year	Constituency	Candidate	Votes	Pct.	Opponent(s)	Votes	Pct.	Ballots cast	Majority	Turnout
2022	N49 Kota Iskandar	Pandak Ahmad (UMNO)	23,133	40.79%	Dzulkefly Ahmad (AMANAH)	18,773	33.10%	58,507	4,360	50.26%
2022	N49 Kota Iskandar	Pandak Ahmad (UMNO)	23,133	40.79%	Samsudin Ismail (BERSATU)	12,503	22.05%	58,507	4,360	50.26%
2022	N49 Kota Iskandar	Pandak Ahmad (UMNO)	23,133	40.79%	Zaini Abu Bakar (PEJUANG)	1,308	2.31%	58,507	4,360	50.26%
2022	N49 Kota Iskandar	Pandak Ahmad (UMNO)	23,133	40.79%	Arangkannal Rajoo (PSM)	997	1.76%	58,507	4,360	50.26%

== Honours ==
- Malaysia :
  - Medal of the Order of the Defender of the Realm (PPN) (2004)
- Malacca :
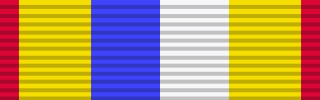
  - Companion Class II of the Order of Malacca (DPSM) - Datuk (2022)
