= Tan Chee Khoon =

Malaysian politician (1919–1996)

Yang Berbahagia Tan Sri Tan Chee Khoon PSM PPM
- 陈志勤

2nd Leader of the Opposition
- In office 1964–1969
- Monarchs: Putra; Ismail Nasiruddin
- Prime Minister: Tunku Abdul Rahman
- Preceded by: Burhanuddin al-Helmy
- Succeeded by: Mohd Asri Muda

Personal details
- Born: 4 March 1919 Cheras, Selangor, Federated Malay States, British Malaya
- Died: 14 October 1996 (aged 77)
- Education: King Edward VII College of Medicine
- Occupation: Politician

Tan Chee Khoon (simplified Chinese: 陈志勤; traditional Chinese: 陳志勤; pinyin: Chén Zhìqín; Cantonese Yale: Chàhn Ji-kàhn; Pe̍h-ōe-jī: Tân Chì-khûn; 4 March 1919 – 14 October 1996) was a major figure in Malaysian politics from 1959 to 1978, at one point being nicknamed "Mr. Opposition" for the outspoken views he presented in Parliament. He was the official Leader of the Opposition in Parliament from 1964 to 1969.Although he was originally a leader of the Labour Party of Malaya and the Socialist Front coalition which Labour had joined, Tan later co-founded Parti Gerakan Rakyat Malaysia (Gerakan), and also Parti Keadilan Masyarakat Malaysia (Pekemas) after he became disillusioned with Gerakan.

== Early years and education ==
Tan was born into a Chinese immigrant family in 1919 in Cheras, Selangor. His parents were Tan Chin Ghee and Tay Kim Siew. On weekends, Tan woke up at 5.30 a.m. to feed livestock, and then cycled five miles to tap rubber. When he returned at 4 in the afternoon, he would tend the vegetable patch and fruit trees in his garden. The Tans were devout Methodist Christians, and attended Cantonese-language services regularly. At the age of 13, Tan lost his left eye in an accident when he tried to carve his name into a rubber tree with a knife.

Tan's first formal education was at the Pudu English Girls' School (despite him being a boy), but he later attended the Victoria Institution (VI). From VI, Tan transferred to Kajang High School, where he was an active Boy Scout. In 1938, Tan competed for the Queen's Scholarship to study medicine in England. However, he had to settle for a scholarship to the King Edward VII College of Medicine in Singapore instead. Even this initially appeared impossible, as he was rejected due to the loss of his eye; however a personal appeal from his headmaster gained him admission to the college.However, soon after Tan entered the college in 1939, Tan had his education interrupted by the outbreak of World War II and the occupation of Malaya and Singapore by the Japanese; Tan spent this period at his home in Kuala Lumpur. When the British returned at the end of the war in 1945, Tan resumed his studies. Tan held several posts in the Medical College's Students' Union, and also helped draw up the constitution for the students' union of the University of Malaya Singapore campus (which would later become the National University of Singapore).

== Initial political involvement ==
After graduating from medical school in 1949, Tan spent two years at the Kuala Lumpur General Hospital before later going into private practice. In 1952, he joined the newly founded Labour Party, and campaigned for it in the 1955 Federal Legislative Council election. Although Labour was soundly defeated, Tan remained committed to it because of his belief in socialism, which the party shared. Tan helped Labour prepare memoranda submitted to the Reid Commission, which drew up the Constitution for Malaya, which achieved independence in 1957.

In 1959, Tan became the chairman of the Selangor Election Committee of the Socialist Front, a coalition between the Labour Party and Parti Rakyat. Labour managed to take advantage of internal discord in the ruling Alliance coalition, and made major gains in the 1959 general election.

== Entering Parliament ==
In 1964, Tan contested both the Parliamentary seat of Batu in Kuala Lumpur and the Selangor State Assembly seat of Kepong. Although the Alliance crushed the opposition, Tan won both seats – with a margin of victory of two votes for his Parliamentary seat, officially the smallest ever margin of victory in a Malaysian election as of 2004.

He was one of only two Labour MPs alongside party leader Lim Kean Siew who won the Dato Keramat seat.

Tan would not relinquish either seat until his retirement. During his tenure as an MP, Tan became known for thoroughly probing government policies and making his views known. As a result, he was popularly known as "Mr. Opposition". Tan was known for his opposition to wanton amendments of the Constitution in Parliament, and also for his outspoken opposition to the establishment of Malaya (and later Malaysia) as an Islamic state, which he felt contravened the Constitution. He was also known for his devotion to his constituents, making himself available to them at least two days a week in his office. Tan made no secret of his religion, and freely peppered his Parliamentary speeches with quotations from the Bible, leading the first Malaysian Prime Minister, Tunku Abdul Rahman, to remark how much he sounded like a preacher.

When the Labour Party was taken over by Chinese-educated members with more leftist views—eventually leading to the party's deregistration by the government, Tan left the party to form Gerakan, with the objective of attracting Malays away from race-based parties such as the United Malays National Organisation (UMNO), a major party in the Alliance catering to the Malay majority of the population.

Gerakan, together with the Democratic Action Party (DAP) and the People’s Progressive Party, which took similar stances to Gerakan, were very successful in the 1969 general elections, and appeared to be on the verge of denying the Alliance the 2/3 Parliamentary majority required to amend the Constitution. In Selangor, Tan's home state, the State Assembly was tied between Alliance and opposition assemblymen.

Tan organised a victory parade on 12 May, and received permission from the police to hold it. However, the participants deviated from the authorised route, jamming traffic, and entered a predominantly Malay area of Kuala Lumpur, where they shouted racial epithets. On 13 May, UMNO organised a retaliatory march, and armed groups of Malays gathered at the capital, Kuala Lumpur. The march degenerated into a racial riot, and the violence continued for two days. Official statistics later put the total dead in the area of 200, although unofficial ones give a figure five times higher. A state of emergency was declared, and Parliament was suspended. The newly formed National Operations Council (NOC), led by Deputy Prime Minister Tun Abdul Razak, took power. Parliament did not reconvene until 1972.

== Pekemas ==
In 1972, Gerakan co-founder Lim Chong Eu led Gerakan into the newly expanded Alliance (renamed as the Barisan Nasional or National Front). Tan strongly opposed this move because he felt it endorsed the race-based parties in Barisan Nasional. As a result, Tan left the party and founded Parti Keadilan Masyarakat Malaysia (Social Justice Party of Malaysia or PEKEMAS), also a non-communal party. Four other MPs joined him in defecting from Gerakan. Despite this, Tan supported the controversial government-supported New Economic Policy (NEP), which expanded the privileges given to Bumiputra (Malays and other indigenous people) under Article 153 of the Constitution because he felt tougher affirmative action was required to address Malay poverty.

In the 1974 general election, Pekemas suffered a terrible defeat, with Tan being the only successful candidate out of 36 candidates for Parliament. Pekemas' campaign against the government was predicated on denying them the requisite 2/3 majority for amending the Constitution, which Tan opposed. The DAP and the Sarawak National Party (SNAP) became the largest opposition parties in Parliament, with nine seats each. This effectively hamstrung Tan's and Pekemas' agenda in Parliament. Health problems also constrained Tan's effectiveness, and he announced his retirement from politics in 1977, although he held his Parliament and Selangor State Assembly seats until their terms expired the next year. Upon his retirement, most of Pekemas' supporters defected to the DAP.

== Non-political activities ==
Tan was famed for his involvement outside the political arena. From the 1950s till 1978, Tan was a member of the Council of the University of Malaya. He was instrumental in the selection of Ungku Aziz as a Professor of Economics – Ungku Aziz would go on to become Vice-Chancellor of the university. In 1967, Tan was elected as Vice-Chairman of the council, and was promoted to chairman four years later. The University Chancellor later awarded him an honorary Doctorate of Laws.

In 1967, Tan was elected President of the Malaysian Medical Association (the first Chinese doctor to hold such office), which he had joined as an honorary member. The same year, he was given a grant of land from Harun bin Idris, then Chief Minister of Selangor, and Tan's political opponent, to build a new private hospital – a pet project of Tan's. In 1972, Prime Minister Tun Abdul Razak personally opened the Sentosa Medical Centre.

Tan was also active in education, and served on the Board of Managers and Board of Governors at many schools, including Batu Road School, Methodist Boys' School Kuala Lumpur, Victoria Institution and Kajang High School. Due to his demonstrated interest in education, the government later appointed him to the Higher Education Advisory Council, which formulated policies for local universities.

Tan was a committed Christian, and attended Wesley Church in Kuala Lumpur, where he served as a member of its Official Board from 1953 onwards.

== Retirement ==
Upon retiring, Tan devoted much of his time to his hobbies, which included reading (at the time of his death, he had accumulated 5,000 books), cricket, and the study of military history, with a special focus on the Middle East. He also wrote a column for The Star, which also published a column by the Tunku, until the government tightened its regulations on the press in 1988. Tan later alleged that he had wanted to write soon after his retirement, but was prevented from doing so because he was formerly in the opposition.

In 1980, Tan was given the title Tan Sri by the Yang di-Pertuan Agong (King). Tan also wrote his autobiography, Tan Chee Koon: From Village Boy To Mr Opposition. Tan later claimed that it was this title which made him acceptable to the establishment, thus permitting him to write for the newspapers.

In 1993, Tan suffered a stroke which paralysed him, preventing him from walking. Tan died on 14 October 1996, and his funeral was held at Wesley Church, next to Methodist Boys' School Kuala Lumpur.

Tan's son, Tan Kee Kwong was elected as MP for Segambut under Gerakan/BN in 1995. He won Segambut on three occasions, serving as MP from 1995 to 2008.

Tan Kee Kwong quit Gerakan to join Parti Keadilan Rakyat (PKR) in early September 2008, citing that race-based politics is on the decline. He contested the 2013 election as its candidate and was elected to serve an additional five years as Wangsa Maju MP.

== Election results ==
Selangor State Legislative Assembly
| Year | Constituency | Candidate | Votes | Pct | Opponent(s) | Votes | Pct | Ballots cast | Majority | Turnout |
|---|---|---|---|---|---|---|---|---|---|---|
| 1964 | N03 Kepong | Tan Chee Khoon (LPM) | 7,487 | 50.01% | Chan Keong Hon (MCA) | 7,485 | 49.99% | 15,663 | 2 | 77.12% |
| 1969 | N03 Kepong | Tan Chee Khoon (Gerakan) | 13,310 | 67.90% | Lee Kim Sai (MCA) | 6,291 | 32.10% | 20,804 | 7,019 | 68.43% |

Parliament of Malaysia
| Year | Constituency | Candidate | Votes | Pct | Opponent(s) | Votes | Pct | Ballots cast | Majority | Turnout |
|---|---|---|---|---|---|---|---|---|---|---|
| 1964 | P066 Batu | Tan Chee Khoon (LPM) | 10,122 | 45.28% | Yap Chin Kwee (MCA) | 9,774 | 43.72% | 23,378 | 348 | 72.38% |
| 1964 | P066 Batu | Tan Chee Khoon (LPM) | 10,122 | 45.28% | Too Chee Cheong (PAP) | 2,459 | 11.00% | 23,378 | 348 | 72.38% |
| 1969 | P066 Batu | Tan Chee Khoon (Gerakan) | 22,720 | 72.15% | Yap Chin Kwee (MCA) | 8,772 | 27.85% | 32,681 | 13,948 | 65.12% |
| 1974 | P084 Kepong | Tan Chee Khoon (PEKEMAS) | 9,858 | 41.18% | Tan Tiong Hong (Gerakan) | 9,192 | 38.40% | 24,379 | 666 | 73.25% |
| 1974 | P084 Kepong | Tan Chee Khoon (PEKEMAS) | 9,858 | 41.18% | Chan Kok Kit (DAP) | 4,206 | 17.57% | 24,379 | 666 | 73.25% |
| 1974 | P084 Kepong | Tan Chee Khoon (PEKEMAS) | 9,858 | 41.18% | George Lim (IND) | 681 | 2.84% | 24,379 | 666 | 73.25% |

== Honours ==
=== Honours of Malaysia ===
- Malaysia
  - Recipient of the Malaysia Commemorative Medal (Silver) (PPM) (1965)
  - Commander of the Order of Loyalty to the Crown of Malaysia (PSM) – Tan Sri (1980)

Political offices
| Preceded by Burhanuddin al-Helmy (Unofficial) | Leader of the Opposition of Malaysia; 1964–1969 | Succeeded by Mohamad Asri Muda |
