= Lim Lip Eng =

Malaysian politician and lawyer

Yang Berhormat Tuan Lim Lip Eng MP
- 林立迎

Member of the Malaysian Parliament for Kepong
- Incumbent
- Assumed office 9 May 2018
- Preceded by: Tan Seng Giaw (PH–DAP)
- Majority: 51,628 (2018); 61,081 (2022)

Member of the Malaysian Parliament for Segambut
- In office 8 March 2008 – 9 May 2018
- Preceded by: Tan Kee Kwong (BN–GERAKAN)
- Succeeded by: Hannah Yeoh Tseow Suan (PH–DAP)
- Majority: 7,732 (2008); 19,199 (2013)

Personal details
- Born: Lim Lip Eng; 25 July 1972 (age 53) Kuala Lumpur, Malaysia
- Party: Democratic Action Party (DAP)
- Other political affiliations: Pakatan Rakyat (PR) (2008–2015); Pakatan Harapan (PH) (since 2015)
- Occupation: Politician
- Profession: Lawyer
- Website: limlipeng.blogspot.com

Lim Lip Eng (Chinese: 林立迎; pinyin: Lín Lìyíng; Pe̍h-ōe-jī: Lîm Li̍p-gêng; born 25 July 1972) is a Malaysian politician and lawyer who has served as the Member of Parliament (MP) for Kepong since May 2018. He served as the MP for Segambut from March 2008 to May 2018. He is a member and Secretary of Kuala Lumpur of the Democratic Action Party (DAP), a component party of the Pakatan Harapan (PH) and formerly Pakatan Rakyat (PR) coalitions.

== Early career ==
Lim is a lawyer by profession.

== Political career ==
Lim was first elected to Parliament in the 2008 election winning the seat of Segambut from the governing Barisan Nasional (BN) coalition. Segambut had previously been considered as a BN stronghold. The election saw urban Chinese and Indian voters swarm to the DAP and its coalition allies; however, given the large minority of Malay voters in Segambut, Lim's victory was also attributable to a sizeable number of Muslim Malays in the constituency backing the DAP, a secular party with few Malay members or politicians. In the 2013 election he re-elected to the Segambut seat for second term. In the 2018 election Lim switched to Kepong constituency and won the seat by an extremely large majority and percentage of total votes. He retained the seat in the 2022 election with a slightly smaller majority and percentage of total votes.

== Controversies ==
Lim Lip Eng was engulfed with a major controversy in August 2019 after suggesting that the implementation of Malay Khat Calligraphy into school children syllabus as rubbing "cow manure on our faces". After severe backlash he apologized and deleted the post from Facebook.

== Election results ==
Parliament of Malaysia
Year	Constituency	Candidate	Votes	Pct	Opponent(s)	Votes	Pct	Ballot cast	Majority	Turnout
2008	P117 Segambut	Lim Lip Eng (DAP)	25,046	59.13%	Ma Woei Chyi (Gerakan)	17,314	40.87%	43,531	7,732	72.93%
2013	P117 Segambut	Lim Lip Eng (DAP)	41,383	65.10%	Jayanthi Devi Balaguru (Gerakan)	22,184	34.90%	64,052	19,199	84.69%
2018	P114 Kepong	Lim Lip Eng (DAP)	56,516	92.04%	Ong Siang Liang (Gerakan)	4,888	7.96%	61,812	51,628	85.03%
2022	P114 Kepong	Lim Lip Eng (DAP)	64,308	88.92%	Yap Zheng Hoe (MCA)	3,227	4.46%	72,657	61,081	77.06%
2022	P114 Kepong	Lim Lip Eng (DAP)	64,308	88.92%	Phang Jing Fatt (Gerakan)	2,795	3.86%	72,657	61,081	77.06%
2022	P114 Kepong	Lim Lip Eng (DAP)	64,308	88.92%	Yee Poh Ping (IND)	1,461	2.02%	72,657	61,081	77.06%
2022	P114 Kepong	Lim Lip Eng (DAP)	64,308	88.92%	Young Shang Yi (WARISAN)	528	0.73%	72,657	61,081	77.06%

== Honours ==
=== Honours of Malaysia ===
- Malaysia
  - Recipient of the 17th Yang di-Pertuan Agong Installation Medal (2024)
