= Segambut (federal constituency) =

Constituency in Kuala Lumpur, Malaysia

Segambut (P117)
Kuala Lumpur constituency

Federal constituency
- Legislature: Dewan Rakyat
- MP: Hannah Yeoh Tseow Suan; PH
- Constituency created: 1994
- First contested: 1995
- Last contested: 2022

Demographics
- Population (2020): 253,715
- Electors (2022): 119,652
- Area (km²): 51
- Pop. density (per km²): 4,974.8

Segambut is a federal constituency in the Federal Territory of Kuala Lumpur, Malaysia, that has been represented in the Dewan Rakyat since 1995.

The federal constituency was created in the 1994 redistribution and is mandated to return a single member to the Dewan Rakyat under the first past the post voting system.

== Demographics ==
Ethnic breakdown of Segambut's electorate as of 2022
1. Chinese (57.0%)
2. Malay (30.2%)
3. Indian (11.8%)
4. Other ethnicities (1.00%)

Age breakdown of Segambut's electorate as of 2022
1. 18-20 (5.35%)
2. 21-29 (18.4%)
3. 30-39 (20.7%)
4. 40-49 (17.6%)
5. 50-59 (15.1%)
6. 60-69 (13.5%)
7. 70-79 (6.83%)
8. 80-89 (2.16%)
9. above 90 (0.51%)
Gender breakdown of Segambut's electorate as of 2022
1. Male (48.7%)
2. Female (51.3%)

== History ==
=== Polling districts ===
According to the gazette issued on 31 October 2022, the Segambut constituency has a total of 24 polling districts.

Polling District	Code	Location
Taman Bukit Maluri Utara	117/00/01	SK Taman Bukit Maluri
Taman Bukit Maluri Selatan	117/00/02	SMK Taman Bukit Maluri
Bandar Menjalara	117/00/03	SMK Menjalara
Desa Park City	117/00/04	SJK (C) Kepong 3
Taman Sri Sinar	117/00/05	SK Taman Seri Sinar
Sri Segambut	117/00/06	SJK (T) Segambut
Kampung Sungai Udang	117/00/07	SJK (C) Khai Chee
Taman Kok Doh	117/00/08	SK Segambut
Taman City Kanan	117/00/09	SMK Raja Ali
Taman Segambut	117/00/10	SMK (P) Jalan Ipoh
Dutamas	117/00/11	SMK Kiaramas
Sri Hartamas	117/00/12	SK Seri Hartamas
Segambut	117/00/13	SMK Segambut Jaya
Bukit Lanjan	117/00/14	SRA Ibnu Kathir Sg Penchala
Kampung Sungai Penchala	117/00/15	SK Sg. Penchala
Taman Tun Dr Ismail Utara	117/00/16	SK Taman Tun Dr. Ismail (1)
Taman Tun Dr Ismail Tengah	117/00/17	SRA Al-Kindi (SRA Taman Tun Dr. Ismail)
Taman Tun Dr Ismail Selatan	117/00/18	SMK Taman Tun Dr. Ismail
Taman Tun Dr Ismail Timur	117/00/19	SK Taman Tun Dr. Ismail (2)
Medan Damansara	117/00/20	SRA Mashud Saidina Umar Al-Khattab, Bukit Damansara
Bukit Damansara	117/00/21	SK Bkt Damansara
Bukit Tunku	117/00/22	SK Sultan Hishamuddin Alam Shah
Kampung Kasipillay	117/00/23	SK Sentul Utama
Kolam Ayer	117/00/24	SM Sains Seri Puteri

=== Representation history ===
Members of Parliament for Segambut
Parliament	No	Years	Member	Party	Vote Share
Constituency created from Kepong and Lembah Pantai
9th	P106	1995–1999	Tan Kee Kwong (陈记光)	BN (GERAKAN)	24,259; 66.72%
10th	P106	1999–2004	Tan Kee Kwong (陈记光)	BN (GERAKAN)	24,926; 60.41%
11th	P117	2004–2008	Tan Kee Kwong (陈记光)	BN (GERAKAN)	28,061; 71.67%
12th	P117	2008–2013	Lim Lip Eng (林立迎)	PR (DAP)	25,046; 59.13%
13th	P117	2013–2015	Lim Lip Eng (林立迎)	PR (DAP)	41,383; 65.10%
13th	P117	2015–2018	Lim Lip Eng (林立迎)	PH (DAP)	41,383; 65.10%
14th	P117	2018–2022	Hannah Yeoh Tseow Suan (杨巧双)	PH (DAP)	53,124; 82.07%
15th	P117	2022–present	Hannah Yeoh Tseow Suan (杨巧双)	PH (DAP)	68,438; 80.05%

=== Historical boundaries ===
Federal constituency	Area		
Federal constituency	1994	2003	2018
Segambut	Bukit Damansara; Kampung Kasipillay; Segambut; Sri Hartamas; Taman Tun Dr Ismail	Bukit Damansara; Kampung Kasipillay; Sri Hartamas; Taman Bukit Maluri; Taman Tun Dr Ismail	

=== Local governments & postcodes ===
No.	Local Government	Postcode
P117	Kuala Lumpur City Hall	50350, 50480, 50490, 50500, 50680, 52100, 52200, 60000 Kuala Lumpur

== Election results ==
Malaysian general election, 2022
Party	Candidate	Votes	%	∆%
PH	Hannah Yeoh Tseow Suan	68,438	80.05	▲80.05
PN	Prabagaran Vythilingam	8,754	10.24	▲10.24
BN	Daniel Ling Sia Chin	8,304	9.71	▼1.76
Total valid votes		85,496	100.00	
Total rejected ballots		389		
Unreturned ballots		389		
Turnout		85,491	71.45	▼12.27
Registered electors		119,652		
Majority		59,684	69.81	▼0.80
PH hold		Swing		
Source(s) https://lom.agc.gov.my/ilims/upload/portal/akta/outputp/1753271/PUB%20613%20(2022)%20-%20PARLIMEN%20WP%20KUALA%20LUMPUR.pdf

Malaysian general election, 2018
Party	Candidate	Votes	%	∆%
PKR	Hannah Yeoh Tseow Suan	53,124	82.07	▲82.07
BN	Loga Bala Mohan Jaganathan	7,422	11.47	▼23.43
PAS	Mohd Solleh Ab Razak	4,181	6.46	▲6.46
Total valid votes		64,727	100.00	
Total rejected ballots		289		
Unreturned ballots		249		
Turnout		65,265	83.72	▼1.14
Registered electors		77,956		
Majority		45,702	70.61	▲40.41
PKR hold		Swing		
Source(s) "His Majesty's Government Gazette - Notice of Contested Election, Parliament for the Federal Territory of Kuala Lumpur [P.U. (B) 240/2018]" (PDF). Attorney General's Chambers of Malaysia. 3 May 2018. "Federal Government Gazette - Results of Contested Election and Statements of the Poll after the Official Addition of Votes, Parliamentary Constituencies for the Federal Territory of Kuala Lumpur [P.U. (B) 314/2018]" (PDF). Attorney General's Chambers of Malaysia. 28 May 2018.

Malaysian general election, 2013
Party	Candidate	Votes	%	∆%
DAP	Lim Lip Eng	41,383	65.10	▲5.97
BN	Jayanthi Devi Balaguru	22,184	34.90	▼5.97
Total valid votes		63,567	100.00	
Total rejected ballots		485		
Unreturned ballots		132		
Turnout		64,184	84.86	▲11.93
Registered electors		75,631		
Majority		19,199	30.20	▲11.94
DAP hold		Swing		
Source(s) "Federal Government Gazette - Notice of Contested Election, Parliament for the Federal Territory of Kuala Lumpur [P.U. (B) 177/2013]" (PDF). Attorney General's Chambers of Malaysia. 26 April 2013. Archived from the original (PDF) on 2018-10-02. "Federal Government Gazette - Results of Contested Election and Statements of the Poll after the Official Addition of Votes, Parliamentary Constituencies for the Federal Territory of Kuala Lumpur [P.U. (B) 218/2013]" (PDF). Attorney General's Chambers of Malaysia. 22 May 2013. Archived from the original (PDF) on 2018-10-02.

Malaysian general election, 2008
Party	Candidate	Votes	%	∆%
DAP	Lim Lip Eng	25,046	59.13	▲30.80
BN	Ma Woei Chyi	17,314	40.87	▼30.80
Total valid votes		42,360	100.00	
Total rejected ballots		541		
Unreturned ballots		630		
Turnout		43,531	72.93	▲2.73
Registered electors		59,690		
Majority		7,732	18.26	▼25.08
DAP gain from BN		Swing		?

Malaysian general election, 2004
Party	Candidate	Votes	%	∆%
BN	Tan Kee Kwong	28,061	71.67	▲11.26
DAP	Kuan Perk Siong	11,093	28.33	▼11.26
Total valid votes		39,154	100.00	
Total rejected ballots		640		
Unreturned ballots		467		
Turnout		40,261	70.20	▲0.04
Registered electors		57,349		
Majority		16,968	43.34	▲22.52
BN hold		Swing		

Malaysian general election, 1999
Party	Candidate	Votes	%	∆%
BN	Tan Kee Kwong	24,926	60.41	▼6.31
DAP	M. Manoharan	16,338	39.59	▲6.31
Total valid votes		41,264	100.00	
Total rejected ballots		378		
Unreturned ballots		533		
Turnout		42,175	70.16	▲2.10
Registered electors		60,113		
Majority		8,588	20.82	▼12.62
BN hold		Swing		

Malaysian general election, 1995
Party	Candidate	Votes	%
BN	Tan Kee Kwong	24,259	66.72
DAP	Abdul Muluk Daud	12,101	33.28
Total valid votes		36,360	100.00
Total rejected ballots		432	
Unreturned ballots		2,088	
Turnout		38,880	68.06
Registered electors		57,126	
Majority		12,158	33.44
This was a new constituency created.
