= Jason Teoh =

Malaysian politician

Yang Berbahagia Datuk Jason Teoh Sew Hock DPSM DIMP KMN
- 张秀福

Personal details
- Born: Gelang Patah, Johor, Malaysia
- Party: Malaysian Chinese Association (MCA)
- Website: www.facebook.com/teohsewhock/

Jason Teoh

Chinese name
- Traditional Chinese: 張秀福
- Simplified Chinese: 张秀福
- Hanyu Pinyin: Zhāng Xiùfú
- Jyutping: Zoeng1 Sau3 Fuk1
- Hokkien POJ: Tiuⁿ Siù-hok
- Tâi-lô: Tiunn Siù-hok

Jason Teoh Sew Hock (simplified Chinese: 张秀福; traditional Chinese: 張秀福; pinyin: Zhāng Xiùfú; Jyutping: Zoeng1 Sau3 Fuk1; Pe̍h-ōe-jī: Tiuⁿ Siù-hok) is a Malaysian politician. He is a member of Malaysian Chinese Association (MCA), a major component party of Barisan Nasional (BN) coalition.

== Career ==
Jason Teoh Sew Hock is the Chairman for MCA Iskandar Puteri division.

At GE13 in 2013, MCA division chief Jason Teoh was prepared to help BN retain the Gelang Patah seat, but was forced to give way to Abdul Ghani. At GE14 in 2018, Jason Teoh nominated as Barisan Nasional candidate to regain the Iskandar Puteri seat (previously known as Gelang Patah), however defeated by Lim Kit Siang from DAP.

He was re-elected as chairman MCA Iskandar Puteri division in the 2018 MCA party election.

== Election results ==
Parliament of Malaysia
Year	Constituency	Candidate	Votes	Pct	Opponent(s)	Votes	Pct	Ballots cast	Majority	Turnout
2018	P162 Iskandar Puteri	Jason Teoh Sew Hock (MCA)	35,862	30.76%	Lim Kit Siang (DAP)	80,726	69.24%	118,779	44,864	85.90%
2022	P162 Iskandar Puteri	Jason Teoh Sew Hock (MCA)	36,783	22.47%	Liew Chin Tong (DAP)	96,819	59.15%	165,527	60,036	74.42%
2022	P162 Iskandar Puteri	Jason Teoh Sew Hock (MCA)	36,783	22.47%	Tan Nam Cha (BERSATU)	30,078	18.38%	165,527	60,036	74.42%

== Honours ==
- Malaysia
  - Officer of the Order of the Defender of the Realm (KMN) (2011)
- Pahang
  - Knight Companion of the Order of the Crown of Pahang (DIMP) – Dato' (2010)
- Malacca
  - Companion Class II of the Exalted Order of Malacca (DPSM) – Datuk (2016)
