= Lim Kit Siang =

Malaysian politician

Yang Berbahagia Tan Sri Dato' Seri Utama Lim Kit Siang PSM DUPN
- 林吉祥
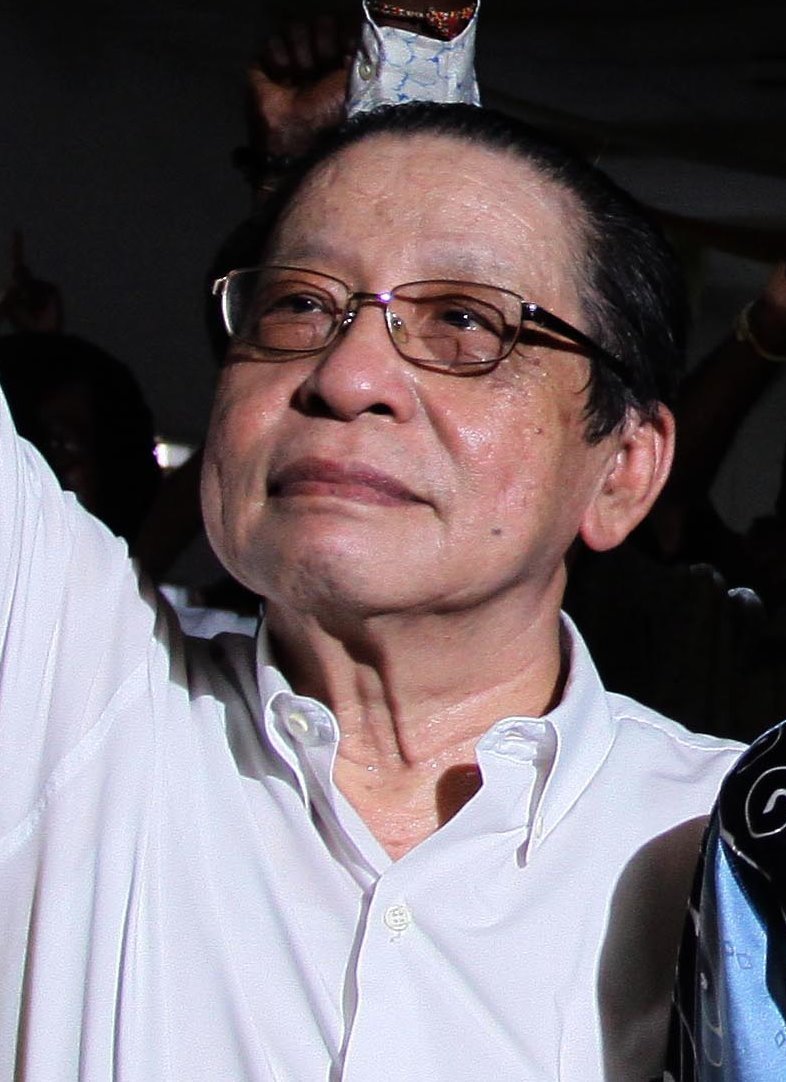
- Lim in 2013

Leader of the Opposition
- In office 21 March 2004 – 8 March 2008
- Monarchs: Sirajuddin; Mizan Zainal Abidin
- Prime Minister: Abdullah Ahmad Badawi
- Preceded by: Abdul Hadi Awang
- Succeeded by: Wan Azizah Wan Ismail
- In office 5 November 1975 – 29 November 1999
- Monarchs: See list: Abdul Halim; Yahya Petra; Ahmad Shah; Iskandar; Azlan Shah; Ja'afar; Salahuddin
- Prime Minister: Abdul Razak Hussein; Hussein Onn; Mahathir Mohamad
- Preceded by: Edmund Langgu Anak Saga
- Succeeded by: Fadzil Noor
- In office 17 April 1973 – 24 August 1974
- Monarch: Abdul Halim
- Prime Minister: Abdul Razak Hussein
- Preceded by: Mohamed Asri Muda
- Succeeded by: James Wong

2nd National Chairman of the Democratic Action Party
- In office 3 December 1999 – 4 September 2004
- Secretary-General: Kerk Kim Hock
- Preceded by: Chen Man Hin
- Succeeded by: Karpal Singh

3rd Secretary-General of the Democratic Action Party
- In office 1 October 1970 – 3 December 1999
- National Chairman: Chen Man Hin
- Preceded by: Fan Yew Teng (acting)
- Succeeded by: Kerk Kim Hock
Federal parliamentary seats
Member of the Malaysian Parliament for Iskandar Puteri
In office 9 May 2018 – 19 November 2022
Preceded by	Constituency established
Succeeded by	Liew Chin Tong
Member of the Malaysian Parliament for Gelang Patah
In office 6 May 2013 – 9 May 2018
Preceded by	Tan Ah Eng
Succeeded by	Constituency abolished
Member of the Malaysian Parliament for Ipoh Timor
In office 21 March 2004 – 5 May 2013
Preceded by	Thong Fah Chong
Succeeded by	Thomas Su Keong Siong
Member of the Malaysian Parliament for Tanjong
In office 3 August 1986 – 29 November 1999
Preceded by	Koh Tsu Koon
Succeeded by	Chow Kon Yeow
Member of the Malaysian Parliament for Petaling
In office 8 July 1978 – 26 April 1982
Preceded by	Oh Keng Seng
Succeeded by	Yeoh Poh San
Member of the Malaysian Parliament for Kota Melaka
In office 26 April 1982 – 3 August 1986
Preceded by	Chan Teck Chan
Succeeded by	Lim Guan Eng
In office 24 August 1974 – 8 July 1978
Preceded by	Constituency established
Succeeded by	Chan Teck Chan
Member of the Malaysian Parliament for Bandar Malacca
In office 10 May 1969 – 24 August 1974*
Preceded by	Tan Kee Gak
Succeeded by	Constituency abolished
State parliamentary seats
Member of the Penang State Legislative Assembly for Padang Kota
In office 20 October 1990 – 24 April 1995
Preceded by	Lim Chong Eu
Succeeded by	Teng Chang Yeow
Member of the Penang State Legislative Assembly for Kampong Kolam
In office 3 August 1986 – 20 October 1990
Preceded by	Wong Hoong Keat
Succeeded by	Cheah Teik Hoe
Member of the Malacca State Legislative Assembly for Kubu
In office 1974–1982
Preceded by	Constituency established
Succeeded by	Yong Wee Yook

Personal details
- Born: 20 February 1941 (age 85) Batu Pahat, Johor, Unfederated Malay States
- Citizenship: Malaysia
- Party: Democratic Action Party (DAP)
- Other political affiliations: Gagasan Rakyat (GR) (1990–1996); Barisan Alternatif (BA) (1998–2004); Pakatan Rakyat (PR) (2008–2015); Pakatan Harapan (PH) (since 2015)
- Spouse: Neo Yoke Tee (m. 1960)
- Children: 4 (including Guan Eng and Hui Ying)
- Website: limkitsiang.com
- *Parliament suspended from 13 May 1969 to 20 February 1971

Lim Kit Siang (Chinese: 林吉祥; pinyin: Lín Jíxiáng; Pe̍h-ōe-jī: Lîm Kiat-siâng; born 20 February 1941) is a Malaysian retired politician. Having held the position for a total of 29 years on three occasions, he is the longest-serving leader of the opposition, as well the second longest-serving member of parliament in Malaysia. He was also the former secretary-general and national chairman of the Democratic Action Party (DAP), a component party of the Pakatan Harapan coalition, leading it through eight general elections.

== Early life and education ==
Lim was born on 20 February 1941 at Batu Pahat, Johor, British Malaya. His father was from Qinying Village, while his mother was from Zhangtang Village, both located in Dongshan County, Zhangzhou, Fujian, in China. The youngest of four children, Lim's parents gave their eldest daughter to a farmer in Qinying for adoption before immigrating to Malaya and giving birth to Lim. He had one sister and two brothers. Lim visited his ancestral village of Qinying for the first time in November 2008, meeting his brother-in-law.

Lim spent two years studying at a Mandarin-language night school before transferring to Batu Pahat High School, graduating with 5 As in his Cambridge School Certificate of Education examination. Lim was admitted to the English College Johore Bahru to continue his sixth form studies but dropped out after two months to marry his wife, Neo Yok Tee, at the age of 19. The pair had met when they were 15 but their marriage was not approved by Lim's parents, who had wanted him to become a doctor, and disowned him.

He gained employment teaching English at the Senai Chinese Primary School before working as a reporter for The Straits Times and Singapore Radio in Singapore, where he would live until 1965. During this time, he became the secretary-general of the Singapore National Union of Journalists at the age of 22 and came into contact with Devan Nair, then head of the National Trades Union Congress.

He pursued a legal education his at London University, earning a Bachelor of Laws (LL.B), and was called to the bar at Lincoln's Inn in 1977.

== Political career ==
Upon the separation of Singapore from Malaysia in 1965, Devan Nair, who was also the member of parliament for Bungsar in Malaysia, left Singapore to return to the Malaysian capital city of Kuala Lumpur and offered Lim a position as his political secretary, which he accepted. A founding member of Nair's new Democratic Action Party, he was made the editor of the party's publication, The Rocket, and was appointed national organising secretary in 1966.

Lim was elected the member of parliament for Bandar Malacca in the 1969 Malaysian general election, which saw substantial gains made by multi-racial opposition parties such as the DAP. The results of the election and subsequent reaction led to the 13 May incident, a racial riot in Kuala Lumpur. Lim was named by the government as a suspected instigator arrested under the Internal Security Act, which allowed for indefinite detainment. Upon hearing the news of his impending arrest, Lim had initially fled to Singapore but returned on 15 May. He was denied access to a lawyer or his family for the first of two months he was held in solitary confinement, and Lim claimed the authorities tried to break him down psychologically. He was only freed on 1 October 1970 after 16 months.

His election as a member of parliament for Bandar Malacca was initially held to be void because of the ineligibility of an election agent who had previously failed to discharge his duties from standing for election in the future. The Prime Minister of Malaysia, Abdul Razak Hussein, moved a motion in Parliament to prevent Lim from serving as an MP, granting him instead a period of time to request a royal pardon from the Yang di-Pertuan Agong (King). After receiving a royal pardon, Lim was allowed to retain his seat.

In 1979, he was convicted of five charges under the Official Secrets Act for exposing an arms deal between the Malaysian government and a Swiss company.

He led the party as secretary-general until 1999 when he was elected party chairman, succeeding Chen Man Hin. In 2004, he refused re-appointment as the chairman and Karpal Singh was elected to replace him. Lim was then elected to an advisory role as the leader of a newly created body called the "Policy and Strategic Planning Commission". His son, Lim Guan Eng, became secretary-general of the party during this time.

After winning a parliamentary seat from Ipoh Timor during the 2004 general election, which also saw his party clinching the most seats of any opposition party, Lim became the Parliamentary Opposition Leader.

Lim contested and won in the constituency of Gelang Patah against Barisan Nasional heavyweight and former Menteri Besar of Johor Abdul Ghani Othman in the 2013 general election.

On 22 October 2015, Lim was suspended for six months from parliament for insulting the speaker, Pandikar Amin Mulia. Earlier, he had stated that Pandikar was abusing his powers by ruling that the Parliament's Public Accounts Committee (PAC) could not continue its ongoing investigation into 1Malaysia Development Berhad scandal (1MDB) due to the transfer of four PAC members to the Cabinet. Pandikar had insisted that Lim apologize and withdraw his statement against him. However, Lim did not apologise or retract his remarks.

Over the course of his parliamentary career, Lim has represented eight federal constituencies.

- Bandar Malacca, Melaka (1969–1974)
- Kota Melaka, Melaka (1974–1978)
- Petaling, Selangor (1978–1982)
- Kota Melaka, Melaka (1982–1986)
- Tanjong, Penang (1986–1999)
- Ipoh Timor, Perak (2004–2013)
- Gelang Patah, Johor (2013-2018)
- Iskandar Puteri, Johor (2018-2022)

Lim has also served as a state assemblyman in Melaka and Penang during the following periods: Kubu, Melaka (1974–1982); Kampong Kolam, Penang (1986–1990); and Padang Kota, Penang (1990–1995).

=== Leader of the opposition ===
Lim was leader of the opposition for 18 months from January 1973 to July 1974, succeeding Asri Muda, and again from November 1975 to November 1999, before losing his seat in the 1999 general election. He became opposition leader again from March 2004 to March 2008.

=== Retirement ===
Lim announced his retirement from politics on 20 March 2022, citing old age. Newly elected Democratic Action Party secretary-general Anthony Loke had originally intended to appoint him as the party's "mentor", but Lim declined the position.

After Lim's retirement, he was bestowed the federal honorific title Tan Sri in 2023 and Penang state title Dato' Seri Utama in 2024.

== Personal life ==
He is married with 4 children. He is the father of Lim Guan Eng, the incumbent national chairman of the Democratic Action Party, as well as Lim Hui Ying, the Deputy Minister of Women, Family and Community Development .

== Election results ==
Parliament of Malaysia
Year	Constituency	Candidate	Votes	Pct	Opponent(s)	Votes	Pct	Ballots cast	Majority	Turnout
1969	P086 Bandar Malacca	Lim Kit Siang (DAP)	18,562	60.80%	Koh Kim Leng (MCA)	7,346	24.06%	31,484	11,216	73.77%
1969	P086 Bandar Malacca	Lim Kit Siang (DAP)	18,562	60.80%	Hasnul Abdul Hadi (PSRM)	4,621	15.14%	31,484	11,216	73.77%
1974	P098 Kota Melaka	Lim Kit Siang (DAP)	17,664	51.93%	Loh Kee Peng (MCA)	13,460	39.57%	34,738	4,204	74.53%
1974	P098 Kota Melaka	Lim Kit Siang (DAP)	17,664	51.93%	Thum Kim Kui (PSRM)	2,165	6.36%	34,738	4,204	74.53%
1974	P098 Kota Melaka	Lim Kit Siang (DAP)	17,664	51.93%	Lee Kou Ming (PEKEMAS)	726	2.13%	34,738	4,204	74.53%
1978	P081 Petaling	Lim Kit Siang (DAP)	41,017	62.83%	Yeoh Poh San (MCA)	24,263	37.17%	90,611	16,754	74.59%
1982	P098 Kota Melaka	Lim Kit Siang (DAP)	29,310	54.51%	Chan Teck Chan (MCA)	24,459	45.49%	54,914	4,851	78.56%
1986	P045 Tanjong	Lim Kit Siang (DAP)	27,611	63.43%	Koh Tsu Koon (Gerakan)	15,921	36.57%	44,463	11,690	73.32%
1990	P045 Tanjong	Lim Kit Siang (DAP)	30,954	69.66%	Boey Weng Keat (Gerakan)	13,485	30.34%	45,392	17,469	74.55%
1995	P048 Tanjong	Lim Kit Siang (DAP)	25,622	56.75%	Oh Keng Seng (Gerakan)	18,727	41.48%	45,971	6,895	72.57%
1995	P048 Tanjong	Lim Kit Siang (DAP)	25,622	56.75%	Khor Gark Kim (PBS)	800	1.77%	45,971	6,895	72.57%
1999	P047 Bukit Bendera	Lim Kit Siang (DAP)	24,176	49.50%	Chia Kwang Chye (Gerakan)	24,280	49.72%	49,887	104	71.67%
2004	P064 Ipoh Timor	Lim Kit Siang (DAP)	28,851	60.20%	Thong Fah Chong (MCA)	19,077	39.80%	49,175	9,774	67.06%
2008	P064 Ipoh Timor	Lim Kit Siang (DAP)	37,364	70.12%	Liew Mun Hon (MCA)	15,422	28.94%	53,994	21,942	70.45%
2013	P162 Gelang Patah	Lim Kit Siang (DAP)	54,284	57.74%	Abdul Ghani Othman (UMNO)	39,522	42.04%	95,071	14,762	89.08%
2018	P162 Iskandar Puteri	Lim Kit Siang (DAP)	80,726	69.24%	Jason Teoh Sew Hock (MCA)	35,862	30.76%	118,779	44,864	85.90%

Selangor State Legislative Assembly
Year	Constituency	Candidate	Votes	Pct	Opponent(s)	Votes	Pct	Ballots cast	Majority	Turnout
1968	N17 Serdang	Lim Kit Siang (DAP)	5,928	42.98%	Thuan Paik Phok (MCA)	6,535	47.38%		607	
1968	N17 Serdang	Lim Kit Siang (DAP)	5,928	42.98%	Tan Han Swee (Gerakan)	1,330	9.64%		607	

Malacca State Legislative Assembly
Year	Constituency	Candidate	Votes	Pct	Opponent(s)	Votes	Pct	Ballots cast	Majority	Turnout
1974	N18 Kubu	Lim Kit Siang (DAP)	4,746	61.18%	Sivapunniam Krishnasamy (MIC)	1,881	24.25%	7,961	2,865	81.85%
1974	N18 Kubu	Lim Kit Siang (DAP)	4,746	61.18%	Tan Giap Seng (PEKEMAS)	697	8.99%	7,961	2,865	81.85%
1974	N18 Kubu	Lim Kit Siang (DAP)	4,746	61.18%	Thum Kui Kim (PSRM)	433	5.58%	7,961	2,865	81.85%
1978	N18 Kubu	Lim Kit Siang (DAP)						12,739	4,649	
1982	N20 Bandar Hilir	Lim Kit Siang (DAP)	3,384		Gan Boon Leong (MCA)	6,447		10,050	3,063	77.9%
1982	N20 Bandar Hilir	Lim Kit Siang (DAP)	3,384		Lee Ching Sen (IND)	44		10,050	3,063	77.9%

Penang State Legislative Assembly
Year	Constituency	Candidate	Votes	Pct	Opponent(s)	Votes	Pct	Ballots cast	Majority	Turnout
1986	N24 Kampong Kolam	Lim Kit Siang (DAP)	8,900	63.07%	Tham Soon Seong (Gerakan)	5,211	36.93%	14,391	3,689	73.49%
1990	N22 Padang Kota	Lim Kit Siang (DAP)	6,317	52.96%	Lim Chong Eu (Gerakan)	5,611	47.04%	12,221	706	72.14%
1995	N19 Tanjong Bunga	Lim Kit Siang (DAP)	5,384	29.15%	Koh Tsu Koon (Gerakan)	13,087	70.85%	18,815	7,703	77.68%
1999	N21 Kebun Bunga	Lim Kit Siang (DAP)	5,142	37.11%	Teng Hock Nan (Gerakan)	8,551	61.72%	14,195	3,409	68.67%

== Honours ==
=== Honours of Malaysia ===
- Malaysia
  - Commander of the Order of Loyalty to the Crown of Malaysia (PSM) – Tan Sri (2023)
- Penang
  - Knight Grand Commander of the Order of the Defender of State (DUPN) – Dato' Seri Utama (2024)

== Timeline ==
- 1941: Born in Batu Pahat, Johor, British Malaya
- 1966: National Organising Secretary of the DAP (1966 to 1969).
- 1969: Elected Member of Parliament for Kota Melaka (1969–1974);
  - Promoted to Secretary-General of DAP;
  - Detained under the Internal Security Act for 18 months.
- 1974: Elected Member of Parliament for Kota Melaka, and State Assemblyman for Kubu, Melaka (1974–1978).
- 1978: Elected Member of Parliament for Petaling Jaya (1978–1982);
- 1979: Convicted of five charges under Official Secrets Act for exposing an arms deal between the government and a Swiss company.
- 1982: Elected Member of Parliament for Kota Melaka (1982–1986).
- 1986: Elected Member of Parliament for Tanjong, and State Assemblyman for Kampong Kolam, Penang (1986–1989).
- 1990: Elected State Assemblyman for Padang Kota, Penang (1990 -1995).
- 1999: Lost the election;
  - Elected Chairman of DAP.
- 2004: Elected Member of Parliament for Ipoh Timur, led the opposition in parliament;
  - Led the party's parliamentary caucus in the newly created position of Chairman of the Central Policy and Strategic Planning Commission.
- 2008: Incumbent and re-elected as Member of Parliament for Ipoh Timur.
  - Post of Leader of Opposition succeeded by Datuk Seri Wan Azizah Wan Ismail.
- 2013: Contested in Gelang Patah Parliament Seat against Menteri Besar of Johor Abdul Ghani Othman, and won.
- 2018: Elected Member of Parliament for Iskandar Puteri.
- 2022: Retired from politics.
- 2023: Bestowed with the honorific title of Tan Sri during the Yang di-Pertuan Agong Al-Sultan Abdullah Ri’ayatuddin Al-Mustafa Billah Shah’s formal 64th birthday celebrations.

== Books ==
1. Time Bombs in Malaysia (1978)
2. DAP and Labour Issues (1978)
3. Malaysia in the Dangerous 80s (1982)
4. Constitutional Crisis in Malaysia (1983)
5. This Day in the Last 18 Months (1983)
6. The BMF Scandal (1984)
7. Harris Salleh – Politics & Morality (1984)
8. Human rights In Malaysia (1985)
9. Malaysia – Crisis of Identity (1986)
10. BMF – The Scandal Of Scandals (1986)
11. The North-South Highway Scandal (1987)
12. Prelude To Operation Lalang (1990)
13. The Dirtiest General Elections In The History of Malaysia (1991)
14. Selected Speeches & Press Statements – Vol. I (1991)
15. Samy Vellu and MAIKA Scandal (1992)
16. Battle For Democracy (1992)
17. Vijandran Pornographic Videotape Scandal II (1992)
18. The Highland Tower Tragedy (1994)
19. Pendedahan Skandal Kewangan – Siapa Petualang FELCRA? (1994)
20. Land Acquisition Act – Abuses, Injustices, Reform (1994)
21. I.T. For All (1997)
22. Cyberlaws in Malaysia (1997)
23. Economic & Financial Crisis (1998)
24. Political & Economic Crisis in Malaysia (1998)
25. The Budget That Was Never Passed (1999)
26. Constitutional Case of the Millennium (2000)
27. BA & Islamic State (2001)
28. No To 929 (2002)
29. DAP (2004)

== Notes and references ==
=== Other references ===
- Pillai, M.G.G. (1 November 2005). "Did Lee Kuan Yew want Singapore ejected from Malaysia?". Malaysia Today.

Parliament of Malaysia
Preceded by Tan Kee Gak	Member of the Dewan Rakyat for Bandar Malacca; 1969–1974	Constituency abolished
New constituency	Member of the Dewan Rakyat for Kota Melaka; 1974–1978	Succeeded by Chan Teck Chan
Preceded by Oh Keng Sang	Member of the Dewan Rakyat for Petaling; 1978–1982	Succeeded by Yeoh Poh San
Preceded by Chan Teck Chan	Member of the Dewan Rakyat for Kota Melaka; 1982–1986	Succeeded by Lim Guan Eng
Preceded by Koh Tsu Koon	Member of the Dewan Rakyat for Tanjong; 1986–1999	Succeeded by Chow Kon Yeow
Preceded by Thong Fah Thong	Member of the Dewan Rakyat for Ipoh Timor; 2004–2013	Succeeded by Thomas Su Keong Siong
Preceded by Tan Ah Eng	Member of the Dewan Rakyat for Gelang Patah; 2013–2018	Constituency abolished
New constituency	Member of the Dewan Rakyat for Iskandar Puteri; 2018–2022	Succeeded by Liew Chin Tong
Assembly seats
New constituency	Member of the Malacca State Legislative Assembly for Kubu; 1974–1982	Succeeded by Yong Wee Yook
Preceded by Wong Hoong Keat	Member of the Penang State Legislative Assembly for Kampong Kolam; 1986–1990	Succeeded by Cheah Teik Hoe
Preceded by Lim Chong Eu	Member of the Penang State Legislative Assembly for Padang Kota; 1990–1995	Succeeded by Teng Chang Yeow
Party political offices
New office	National Organising Secretary of the Democratic Action Party; 1966–1969	Succeeded by Fan Yew Teng
Preceded by Fan Yew Teng (acting)	Secretary-General of the Democratic Action Party; 1969–1999	Succeeded by Kerk Kim Hock
Preceded by Chen Man Hin	National Chairman of the Democratic Action Party; 1999–2004	Succeeded by Karpal Singh
New office	Chairman of the Central Policy and Strategic Planning Commission of the Democratic Action Party; 2004–2022	Position abolished
New office	Parliamentary Leader of the Democratic Action Party; 2008–2018	Succeeded by Anthony Loke
New office	Mentor of the Democratic Action Party; 2022	Position abolished
Political offices
Preceded by Mohamed Asri Muda	Leader of the Opposition; 1973–1974	Succeeded by James Wong
Preceded by Edmund Langgu Saga	Leader of the Opposition; 1975–1999	Succeeded by Fadzil Noor
Preceded by Abdul Hadi Awang	Leader of the Opposition; 2004–2008	Succeeded by Wan Azizah Wan Ismail
