= Rengit (state constituency) =

State constituency in Johor, Malaysia

Rengit (N25)
Johor constituency

State constituency
- Legislature: Johor State Legislative Assembly
MLA
Mohd Zaidi Japar
BN
- Constituency created: 1959
- First contested: 1959
- Last contested: 2026

Demographics
- Population (2020): 26,511
- Electors (2026): 27,608
- Area (km²): 199

Rengit is a state constituency in Johor, Malaysia, that is represented in the Johor State Legislative Assembly.

The state constituency was first contested in 1959 and is mandated to return a single Assemblyman to the Johor State Legislative Assembly under the first-past-the-post voting system.

== Demographics ==
As of 2020, Rengit has a population of 26,511 people.

Ethnic breakdown of Rengit's electorate as of 2026
1. Malay (80.5%)
2. Chinese (16.6%)
3. Other ethnicities (2.70%)
4. Indian (0.20%)

== History ==
=== Polling districts ===
According to the gazette issued on 2 July 2026, the Rengit constituency has a total of 11 polling districts.

State constituency	Polling District	Code	Location
Rengit (N25)	Rejo Sari	150/25/01	SK Seri Rejo Sari
Rengit (N25)	Perpat	150/25/02	SK Seri Perpat
Rengit (N25)	Sri Ladang	150/25/03	SK Seri Ladang
Rengit (N25)	Seri Merlong	150/25/04	SK Seri Merlong
Rengit (N25)	Belahan Tampok	150/25/05	SK Seri Belahan
Rengit (N25)	Sungai Merlong	150/25/06	SK Mutiara
Rengit (N25)	Sungai Kluang	150/25/07	SK Rengit
Rengit (N25)	Bandar Rengit Selatan	150/25/08	SMK Permata Jaya
Rengit (N25)	Bandar Rengit Utara	150/25/09	SMK Tun Sardon
Rengit (N25)	Rengit	150/25/10	SJK (C) Chong Hwa Rengit
Rengit (N25)	Punggot	150/25/11	SK Seri Sampurna

=== Representation history ===
Members of the Legislative Assembly for Rengit
Assembly	No	Years	Member	Party
Constituency created
1st	N17	1959-1964	Taha Zakaria	Alliance (UMNO)
2nd	N17	1964-1969	Jalok Daing Malibok	Alliance (UMNO)
		1969-1971	Assembly dissolved	
3rd	N17	1971–1973	Jalok Daing Malibok	Alliance (UMNO)
3rd	N17	1973-1974	Jalok Daing Malibok	BN (UMNO)
4th	N26	1974–1978	Ahmad Paiman	BN (UMNO)
5th	N26	1978–1982	Ahmad Paiman	BN (UMNO)
6th	N26	1982–1986	Abdul Jalal Haji Abu Bakar	BN (UMNO)
7th	N22	1986–1990	Haji Abu Bakar Haji Mohd Dewa	BN (UMNO)
8th	N22	1990–1995	Zainal Abidin Mohamed Zin	BN (UMNO)
9th	N22	1995–1999	Zainal Abidin Mohamed Zin	BN (UMNO)
10th	N22	1999–2004	Zainal Abidin Mohamed Zin	BN (UMNO)
11th	N25	2004–2008	Ayub Jamil	BN (UMNO)
12th	N25	2008–2013	Ayub Jamil	BN (UMNO)
13th	N25	2013–2018	Ayub Jamil	BN (UMNO)
14th	N25	2018–2022	Ayub Jamil	BN (UMNO)
15th	N25	2022–2026	Mohd Puad Zarkashi	BN (UMNO)
16th	N25	2026–present	Mohd Zaidi Japar	BN (UMNO)

== Election results ==
Johor state election, 2026
Party	Candidate	Votes	%	∆%
BN	Mohd Zaidi Japar	14,826	72.06	▲23.15
PH	Mohamad Yazid Bakri	4,009	19.49	▲6.71
PN	Syed Mohamad Syed Alwi	1,739	8.45	▼28.58
Total valid votes		20,574	100.00	
Total rejected ballots		233		
Unreturned ballots		21		
Turnout		20,828	75.44	▲14.25
Registered electors		27,608		
Majority		10,817	52.58	▲40.69
BN hold		Swing		

Johor state election, 2022
Party	Candidate	Votes	%	∆%
BN	Mohd Puad Zarkashi	7,903	48.91	▼6.42
PN	Mohammad Huzair Lajis	5,983	37.03	▲37.03
PH	Khairuddin Abdul Rahim	2,065	12.78	▲12.78
PEJUANG	Nizam Bashir Abdul Kariem Bashir	206	1.27	▲1.27
Total valid votes		16,157	97.34	
Total rejected ballots		346	2.08	
Unreturned ballots		95	0.57	
Turnout		16,598	61.20	▼22.82
Registered electors		27,123		
Majority		1,920	11.88	▼12.06
BN hold		Swing		

Johor state election, 2018
Party	Candidate	Votes	%	∆%
BN	Ayub Jamil	9,642	55.33	▼11.55
PKR	Malik Faishal Ahmad	5,470	31.39	▲31.39
PAS	Mohd. Tumiran Ahmad	2,313	13.27	▼19.85
Total valid votes		17,425	97.79	
Total rejected ballots		329	1.85	
Unreturned ballots		64	0.36	
Turnout		17,818	84.02	▼3.18
Registered electors		21,206		
Majority		4,172	23.94	▼9.82
BN hold		Swing		
Source(s) "RESULTS OF CONTESTED ELECTION AND STATEMENTS OF THE POLL AFTER THE OFFICIAL ADDITION OF VOTES".

Johor state election, 2013
Party	Candidate	Votes	%	∆%
BN	Ayub Jamil	10,882	66.88	▼5.06
PAS	Ahmad Kailani Kosnin	5,390	33.12	▲5.06
Total valid votes		16,272	97.89	
Total rejected ballots		316	1.90	
Unreturned ballots		35	0.21	
Turnout		16,623	87.20	▲8.77
Registered electors		19,067		
Majority		5,492	33.76	▼10.12
BN hold		Swing		
Source(s) "KEPUTUSAN PILIHAN RAYA UMUM DEWAN UNDANGAN NEGERI".

Johor state election, 2008
Party	Candidate	Votes	%	∆%
BN	Ayub Jamil	8,656	71.94	▲0.30
PAS	Hasanuddin Mohd Yunus	3,377	28.06	▼0.30
Total valid votes		12,033	97.40	
Total rejected ballots		293	2.37	
Unreturned ballots		28	0.23	
Turnout		12,354	78.43	▲8.77
Registered electors		15,751		
BN hold		Swing		
Source(s) "KEPUTUSAN PILIHAN RAYA UMUM DEWAN UNDANGAN NEGERI PERAK BAGI TAHUN 2008".

Johor state election, 2004
Party	Candidate	Votes	%	∆%
BN	Ayub Jamil	7,587	71.64	▲5.89
PAS	Hasanuddin Mohd Yunus	3,004	28.36	▼5.89
Total valid votes		10,591	97.11	
Total rejected ballots		315	2.89	
Unreturned ballots		0	0.00	
Turnout		10,906	69.66	▼1.92
Registered electors		15,657		
Majority		4,583	43.28	▲11.78
BN hold		Swing		
Source(s) "KEPUTUSAN PILIHAN RAYA UMUM DEWAN UNDANGAN NEGERI PERAK BAGI TAHUN 2004".

Johor state election, 1999
Party	Candidate	Votes	%	∆%
BN	Zainal Abidin Mohamed Zin	11,163	65.75	▼11.52
PAS	Hasanuddin Mohd Yunus	5,816	34.25	▲11.52
Total valid votes		16,979	96.34	
Total rejected ballots		625	3.55	
Unreturned ballots		20	0.11	
Turnout		17,624	71.58	▲2.14
Registered electors		24,620		
Majority		5,347	31.50	▼23.04
BN hold		Swing		
Source(s) "KEPUTUSAN PILIHAN RAYA UMUM DEWAN UNDANGAN NEGERI PERAK BAGI TAHUN 1999".

Johor state election, 1995
Party	Candidate	Votes	%	∆%
BN	Zainal Abidin Mohamed Zin	12,435	77.27	▲8.94
PAS	Ungku Mohd Noor Ungku Mahmood	3,658	22.73	▼8.94
Total valid votes		16,093	95.24	
Total rejected ballots		759	4.49	
Unreturned ballots		45	0.27	
Turnout		16,897	69.44	▼2.60
Registered electors		24,332		
Majority		8,777	54.54	▲18.18
BN hold		Swing		
Source(s) "KEPUTUSAN PILIHAN RAYA UMUM DEWAN UNDANGAN NEGERI PERAK BAGI TAHUN 1995".

Johor state election, 1990
Party	Candidate	Votes	%	∆%
BN	Zainal Abidin Mohamed Zin	10,535	68.33	▼9.29
PAS	Ungku Mohd Noor Ungku Mahmood	4,883	31.67	▲9.29
Total valid votes		15,418	94.01	
Total rejected ballots		982	5.99	
Unreturned ballots		0	0.00	
Turnout		16,400	72.04	▲2.01
Registered electors		22,764		
Majority		5,652	36.66	▼18.54
BN hold		Swing		
Source(s) "KEPUTUSAN PILIHAN RAYA UMUM DEWAN UNDANGAN NEGERI PERAK BAGI TAHUN 1990".

Johor state election, 1986
Party	Candidate	Votes	%	∆%
BN	Abu Bakar Mohd Dewa	10,215	77.62	
PAS	Ungku Mohd Noor Ungku Mahmood	2,946	22.38	
Total valid votes		13,161	83.40	
Total rejected ballots		2,619	16.60	
Unreturned ballots		0	0.00	
Turnout		15,780	70.03	
Registered electors		22,534		
Majority		7,269	55.24	
BN hold		Swing		
Source(s) "KEPUTUSAN PILIHAN RAYA UMUM DEWAN UNDANGAN NEGERI PERAK BAGI TAHUN 1986".

Johor state election, 1982
Party	Candidate	Votes	%	∆%
BN	Abdul Jalal Abu Bakar			
Total valid votes				
Total rejected ballots				
Unreturned ballots				
Turnout				
Registered electors		15,480		
Majority				
BN hold		Swing		

Johor state election, 1978
Party	Candidate	Votes	%	∆%
BN	Ahmad Mohamed Paiman	8,670	82.53	
PAS	Md. Sulaiman Anuar	1,835	17.47	
Total valid votes		10,505	100.00	
Total rejected ballots		219		
Unreturned ballots		0		
Turnout		10,724	78.54	▲78.54
Registered electors		13,655		
Majority		6,835	65.06	▲65.06
BN hold		Swing		

Johor state election, 1974
Party	Candidate	Votes	%	∆%
BN	Ahmad Mohamed Paiman			
Total valid votes				
Total rejected ballots				
Unreturned ballots				
Turnout				
Registered electors		11,711		
Majority				
BN gain from Alliance		Swing		-

Johor state election, 1969
Party	Candidate	Votes	%	∆%
Alliance	Jalok Daing Malibok	6,244	63.84	▼5.02
PMIP	Md. Sulaiman Anuar	3,536	36.16	▲28.29
Total valid votes		9,780	100.00	
Total rejected ballots		1,424		
Unreturned ballots		0		
Turnout		11,204	75.90	▼5.13
Registered electors		14,762		
Majority		2,708	27.69	▼17.91
Alliance hold		Swing		

Johor state election, 1964
Party	Candidate	Votes	%	∆%
Alliance	Jalok Daing Malibok	6,296	68.87	▲12.55
Independent	Abdul Aziz Abdul Rahman	2,127	23.27	▲23.27
PMIP	Mohamed Turus Daing Melebeh	719	7.86	▲0.82
Total valid votes		9,142	100.00	
Total rejected ballots		960		
Unreturned ballots		0		
Turnout		10,102	81.02	▼0.96
Registered electors		12,468		
Majority		4,169	45.60	▲25.91
Alliance hold		Swing		

Johor state election, 1959
Party	Candidate	Votes	%
Alliance	Taha Zakaria	4,903	56.32
National Party	Mohamed Don Abdullah	3,189	36.63
PMIP	Abdul Jamil Sulaiman	613	7.04
Total valid votes		8,705	100.00
Total rejected ballots		239	
Unreturned ballots		0	
Turnout		8,944	81.98
Registered electors		10,910	
Majority		1,714	19.69
This was a new constituency created.
