= Tan Kee Kwong =

Malaysian politician

Yang Berbahagia Dato' Tan Kee Kwong DMPN
- 陈记光

Member of the Malaysian Parliament for Wangsa Maju
- In office 5 May 2013 – 9 May 2018
- Preceded by: Wee Choo Keong (PR–PKR)
- Succeeded by: Tan Yee Kew (PH–PKR)
- Majority: 5,511 (2013)

Member of the Malaysian Parliament for Segambut
- In office 25 April 1995 – 5 May 2008
- Preceded by: New constituency
- Succeeded by: Lim Lip Eng (PR–DAP)
- Majority: 12,158 (1995); 8,588 (1999); 16,968 (2004)

Personal details
- Born: Tan Kee Kwong; 18 February 1947 (age 79) Selangor, Malayan Union
- Citizenship: Malaysian
- Party: Parti Gerakan Rakyat Malaysia (Gerakan) (1995–2008); People's Justice Party (PKR) (2008–present)
- Other political affiliations: Pakatan Harapan (PH) (2015–); Pakatan Rakyat (PR) (2008-2015); Barisan Nasional (BN) (1995-2008)
- Parent: Tan Chee Khoon
- Education: Universiti Malaya (M.B.B.S.)
- Occupation: Politician; Medical Doctor
- Website: https://www.facebook.com/Tankeekwong Facebook

Tan Kee Kwong
- Traditional Chinese: 陳記光
- Simplified Chinese: 陈记光
Transcriptions
Standard Mandarin
- Hanyu Pinyin: Chén Jìguāng
Yue: Cantonese
- Yale Romanization: Chàhn Gei-gwōng
- Jyutping: Can4 Gei3-gwong1

Tan Kee Kwong (simplified Chinese: 陈记光; traditional Chinese: 陳記光; pinyin: Chén Jìguāng; Cantonese Yale: Chàhn Gei-gwōng; Pe̍h-ōe-jī: Tân Kì-kong; born 1947) is a Malaysian politician of Chinese origin. He served as a Member of Parliament for Wangsa Maju representing People's Justice Party (PKR) of Pakatan Harapan coalition between 2013 and 2018. Previously, he was the Parti Gerakan Rakyat Malaysia (Gerakan) Member of Parliament for Segambut for three terms from 1995 to 2008 and was the deputy minister of Land and Cooperative Development from 1999 to 2004 in the Barisan Nasional (BN) federal government. He later joined PKR in 2008 and currently sits on the party disciplinary board.

== Early life and professional career ==
Tan is born and raised in Kuala Lumpur. His father, Tan Chee Khoon is the founder of the Gerakan party and the former official leader of opposition between 1964 and 1978.

Tan was educated at the Victoria Institution, Kuala Lumpur, from 1960 to 1966. He was its School Captain in his final year. A medical doctor by profession, Tan graduated from University of Malaya and worked in United Kingdom during 1977 and 1981. He then worked for two years in Southern Sudan, practising community medicine with a voluntary Christian NGO. He later returned to Malaysia and started a private clinic on Jalan Tuanku Abdul Rahman in Kuala Lumpur.

== Politics ==
In 1995, he joined Gerakan two month before the general election and Tan Sri Dato' Alex Lee nominated him as a candidate in the new created parliamentary seat of Segambut. He was elected as Member of Parliament for Segambut in the 1995 election and was re-elected in 1999 and 2004 elections. In 1999, he was appointed as the Deputy Minister of Lands and Co-operatives Development by Prime Minister Mahathir Mohamad, a position he held until 2004.

Tan did not contest in the March 2008 general election. He later quit Gerakan and joined PKR in August 2008. In the 2013 election, he contested and was elected as a Member of Parliament from Wangsa Maju on PKR ticket.

== Election results ==
Parliament of Malaysia
| Year | Constituency | Candidate | Votes | Pct | Opponent(s) | Votes | Pct | Ballots cast | Majority | Turnout |
|---|---|---|---|---|---|---|---|---|---|---|
| 1995 | P106 Segambut | Tan Kee Kwong (Gerakan) | 24,259 | 66.72% | Abdul Muluk Daud (DAP) | 12,101 | 33.28% | 38,880 | 12,158 | 68.06% |
| 1999 | P106 Segambut | Tan Kee Kwong (Gerakan) | 24,926 | 60.41% | Manoharan Malayalam (DAP) | 16,338 | 39.59% | 42,175 | 8,588 | 70.16% |
| 2004 | P117 Segambut | Tan Kee Kwong (Gerakan) | 28,061 | 71.67% | Kuan Perk Siong (DAP) | 11,093 | 28.33% | 40,261 | 16,968 | 70.20% |
| 2013 | P116 Wangsa Maju | Tan Kee Kwong (PKR) | 31,641 | 54.77% | Mohd Shafei Abdullah (UMNO) | 26,130 | 45.23% | 58,291 | 5,511 | 86.01% |

== Honours ==
- Penang
  - Companion of the Order of the Defender of State (DMPN) – Dato' (2004)
