= Tan Ah Eng =

Malaysian politician

- 曾亚英

Member of the Malaysian Parliament for Gelang Patah
- In office 21 March 2004 – 5 May 2013
- Preceded by: Teu Si @ Hang See Ten (BN–MCA)
- Succeeded by: Lim Kit Siang (PR–DAP)
- Majority: 31,666 (2004); 8,851 (2008)

Personal details
- Born: 22 August 1955 Johor, Federation of Malaya (now Malaysia)
- Died: 10 August 2013 (aged 57) Kota Tinggi, Johor, Malaysia
- Party: Malaysian Chinese Association (MCA)
- Other political affiliations: Barisan Nasional (BN)
- Spouse: Tan Hee Miang
- Occupation: Politician

Tan Ah Eng (simplified Chinese: 曾亚英; traditional Chinese: 曾亞英; pinyin: Zēng Yà Yīng) (22 August 1955 – 10 August 2013) was a Malaysian politician. She was the Member of the Parliament of Malaysia for the Gelang Patah constituency in the state of Johor from 2004 to 2013. She was member of the Malaysian Chinese Association (MCA), a component party of ruling Barisan Nasional coalition then.

Tan was elected to federal Parliament in the 2004 election, succeeding fellow MCA member Teu Si @ Hang See Ten in the seat of Gelang Patah. She had earlier been a Senator.

Suffering brain cancer, she did not recontest her seat in the 2013 election, and died in August of that year, at the age of 58.

== Election results ==
Parliament of Malaysia
Year	Constituency	Candidate	Votes	Pct	Opponent(s)	Votes	Pct	Ballots cast	Majority	Turnout
2004	P162 Gelang Patah	Tan Ah Eng (MCA)	41,001	81.45%	Song Sing Kwee (PKR)	9,335	18.55%	52,297	31,666	74.69%
2008	P162 Gelang Patah	Tan Ah Eng (MCA)	33,630	57.58%	Zaliha Mustafa (PKR)	24,779	42.42%	58,407	8,851	77.19%

== See also ==
- Gelang Patah (federal constituency)
