= Iskandar Puteri (federal constituency) =

Federal constituency in Johor, Malaysia

Iskandar Puteri (P162)
Johor constituency

Federal constituency
- Legislature: Dewan Rakyat
- MP: Liew Chin Tong; PH
- Constituency created: 2018
- First contested: 2018
- Last contested: 2022

Demographics
- Population (2020): 447,697
- Electors (2026): 239,384
- Area (km²): 294
- Pop. density (per km²): 1,522.8

Iskandar Puteri is a federal constituency in Johor Bahru District and Kulai District, Johor, Malaysia, that has been represented in the Dewan Rakyat since 2018.

The federal constituency was created in the 2018 redistribution and is mandated to return a single member to the Dewan Rakyat under the first past the post voting system.

== Demographics ==
Ethnic breakdown of Iskandar Puteri's electorate as of 2026
1. Chinese (46.0%)
2. Malay (37.2%)
3. Indian (14.1%)
4. Other ethnicities (2.70%)

As of 2020, Iskandar Puteri has a population of 447,697 people.

Age breakdown of Iskandar Puteri's electorate as of 2022
1. 18-20 (7.48%)
2. 21-29 (23.8%)
3. 30-39 (21.2%)
4. 40-49 (18.1%)
5. 50-59 (15.1%)
6. 60-69 (9.58%)
7. 70-79 (3.72%)
8. 80-89 (0.89%)
9. above 90 (0.17%)
Gender breakdown of Iskandar Puteri's electorate as of 2022
1. Male (50.1%)
2. Female (49.9%)

== History ==
The original constituency Gelang Patah renamed to Iskandar Puteri in 2018 when it was redistributed.

=== Polling districts ===
According to the federal gazette issued on 2 July 2026, the Iskandar Puteri constituency has a total of 46 polling districts.

| State constituency | Polling District | Code | Location |
|---|---|---|---|
| Skudai (N48) | Jaya Mas | 162/48/01 | SK Taman Selesa Jaya |
| Skudai (N48) | Selesa Jaya | 162/48/02 | SA Bandar Selesa Jaya |
| Skudai (N48) | Sri Sinding | 162/48/03 | SMK Taman Selesa Jaya |
| Skudai (N48) | Impian Emas | 162/48/04 | SK Taman Impian Emas |
| Skudai (N48) | Sri Skudai | 162/48/05 | SMK Skudai; SA An-Nur Batu 10 Skudai |
| Skudai (N48) | Bandar Skudai Barat | 162/48/06 | SK Sekudai Batu 10 |
| Skudai (N48) | Bandar Skudai Tengah | 162/48/07 | SJK (C) Pu Sze |
| Skudai (N48) | Bandar Skudai Timor | 162/48/08 | SJK (C) Pu Sze |
| Skudai (N48) | Hang Tuah | 162/48/09 | SK Taman Skudai Baru; SA Taman Skudai Baru |
| Skudai (N48) | Laksamana Tuta | 162/48/10 | SK Taman Tun Aminah |
| Skudai (N48) | Nakhota Tuta | 162/48/11 | SMK Taman Tun Aminah; SMK Taman Sutera |
| Skudai (N48) | Flat Perkasa 'A' Tuta | 162/48/12 | SJK (T) Taman Tun Aminah |
| Skudai (N48) | Taman Damai Jaya | 162/48/13 | SK Taman Damai Jaya; SA Taman Damai Jaya |
| Skudai (N48) | Desa Skudai | 162/48/14 | SK Sri Skudai; Dewan Raya Taman Sri Skudai; SK Taman Desa Skudai |
| Skudai (N48) | Hang Jebat | 162/48/15 | SMK Damai Jaya; SMK Taman Selesa Jaya 2; SK Taman Skudai Baru 2 |
| Skudai (N48) | Perwira Tuta | 162/48/16 | Dewan Raya Taman Ungku Tun Aminah |
| Skudai (N48) | Hulubalang Tuta | 162/48/17 | SK Taman Tun Aminah 2 |
| Skudai (N48) | Skudai Utara | 162/48/18 | SJK (C) Kuo Kuang |
| Skudai (N48) | Flat Perkasa 'B' Tuta | 162/48/19 | SA Taman Ungku Tun Aminah |
| Skudai (N48) | Taman Jaya | 162/48/20 | SMK Taman Impian Emas |
| Skudai (N48) | Bukit Impian | 162/48/21 | SJK (C) Thai Hong |
| Kota Iskandar (N49) | Mutiara Rini | 162/49/01 | SK Taman Mutiara Rini; SMK Taman Mutiara Rini 2; SJK (C) Thorburn |
| Kota Iskandar (N49) | Kangkar Pulai | 162/49/02 | SJK (C) Pulai |
| Kota Iskandar (N49) | Pertanian | 162/49/03 | SA Tafrijiyyah Taman Universiti |
| Kota Iskandar (N49) | Kebangsaan | 162/49/04 | SMK Taman Universiti 2; SK Taman Universiti 4 |
| Kota Iskandar (N49) | Lima Kedai | 162/49/05 | SJK (C) Ping Ming |
| Kota Iskandar (N49) | Gelang Patah Utara | 162/49/06 | SK Gelang Patah; SA Gelang Patah |
| Kota Iskandar (N49) | Kampung Pulai | 162/49/07 | SK Kampung Pulai |
| Kota Iskandar (N49) | Sungai Melayu | 162/49/08 | SK Sungai Melayu |
| Kota Iskandar (N49) | Tebing Runtoh | 162/49/09 | SK Sikijang |
| Kota Iskandar (N49) | Kampong Pendas | 162/49/10 | SK Pendas Laut |
| Kota Iskandar (N49) | Gelang Patah Selatan | 162/49/11 | SMK Gelang Patah |
| Kota Iskandar (N49) | Tiram Duku | 162/49/12 | SK Tiram Duku |
| Kota Iskandar (N49) | Tanjong Kupang | 162/49/13 | SK Tanjung Kupang |
| Kota Iskandar (N49) | Kampong Pok Besar | 162/49/14 | SK Morni Pok |
| Kota Iskandar (N49) | Tanjong Adang | 162/49/15 | SK Tanjong Adang |
| Kota Iskandar (N49) | Penyiaran | 162/49/16 | SK Taman Universiti 1 |
| Kota Iskandar (N49) | Kemuliaan | 162/49/17 | SMK Taman Universiti; SK Taman Universiti 3 |
| Kota Iskandar (N49) | Perubatan | 162/49/18 | SK Taman Universiti 2 |
| Kota Iskandar (N49) | Pulai Indah | 162/49/19 | SK Kangkar Pulai; SA Taman Pulai Indah |
| Kota Iskandar (N49) | Pulai Utama | 162/49/20 | SA Taman Universiti |
| Kota Iskandar (N49) | Sri Pulai Perdana | 162/49/21 | SK Sri Pulai Perdana |
| Kota Iskandar (N49) | Pulai | 162/49/22 | SJK (C) Woon Hwa |
| Kota Iskandar (N49) | Sri Pulai | 162/49/23 | SK Taman Sri Pulai; Dewan Raya Taman Sri Pulai |
| Kota Iskandar (N49) | Teratai | 162/49/24 | SA Taman Seri Pulai |
| Kota Iskandar (N49) | Nusa Perintis | 162/49/25 | SK Taman Nusa Perintis; SK Nusantara; SMK Taman Nusa Jaya |

=== Representation history ===
Members of Parliament for Iskandar Puteri
| Parliament | No | Years | Member | Party | Vote Share |
Constituency created from Gelang Patah and Kulai
| 14th | P162 | 2018–2022 | Lim Kit Siang (林吉祥) | PH (DAP) | 80,726; 69.24% |
| 15th | P162 | 2022–present | Liew Chin Tong (刘镇东) | PH (DAP) | 96,819; 59.15% |

=== State constituency ===
| Parliamentary constituency | State constituency | | | | | | |
| Parliamentary constituency | 1954–59* | 1959–1974 | 1974–1986 | 1986–1995 | 1995–2004 | 2004–2018 | 2018–present |
|---|---|---|---|---|---|---|---|
| Iskandar Puteri | | | | | | | Kota Iskandar |
| Iskandar Puteri | | | | | | | Skudai |

=== Historical boundaries ===
| State Constituency | Area |
| State Constituency | 2018 |
|---|---|
| Kota Iskandar | Gelang Patah; Kangkar Pulai; Lima Kedai; Mutiara Rini; Tanjung Pelepas |
| Skudai | Bandar Skudai; Taman Impian Emas; Taman Industri Jaya; Taman Melawati; Taman Ungku Aminah |

=== Current state assembly members ===
| No. | State Constituency | Member | Coalition (Party) |
|---|---|---|---|
| N48 | Skudai | Kartiyaini Jeyapalan | PH (DAP) |
| N49 | Kota Iskandar | Pandak Ahmad | BN (UMNO) |

=== Local governments & postcodes ===
| No. | State Constituency | Local Government | Postcode |
|---|---|---|---|
| N48 | Skudai | Johor Bahru City Council (Bukit Impian area); Iskandar Puteri City Council | 79000, 79100, 79150, 79200, 79250, 79502, 79503, 79520, 79680 Iskandar Puteri; 81100, 81300 Skudai; 81200 Johor Bahru; 81550 Gelang Patah; 81500 Pekan Nanas |
| N49 | Kota Iskandar | Iskandar Puteri City Council; Kulai Municipal Council (Kangkar Pulai area) | 79000, 79100, 79150, 79200, 79250, 79502, 79503, 79520, 79680 Iskandar Puteri; 81100, 81300 Skudai; 81200 Johor Bahru; 81550 Gelang Patah; 81500 Pekan Nanas |

== Election results ==
Malaysian general election, 2022
| Party | Candidate | Votes | % | ∆% |
|---|---|---|---|---|
| PH | Liew Chin Tong | 96,819 | 59.15 | ▲59.15 |
| BN | Jason Teoh Sew Hock | 36,783 | 22.47 | ▼8.29 |
| PN | Tan Nam Cha | 30,078 | 18.38 | ▲18.38 |
| Total valid votes | | 163,680 | 100.00 | |
| Total rejected ballots | | 1,535 | | |
| Unreturned ballots | | 532 | | |
| Turnout | | 165,527 | 74.42 | ▼11.47 |
| Registered electors | | 222,437 | | |
| Majority | | 60,036 | 36.68 | ▼1.84 |
| PH hold | | Swing | | |
Source(s) https://lom.agc.gov.my/ilims/upload/portal/akta/outputp/1753254/PUB%20617%20PARLIMEN%20JOHOR.pdf

Malaysian general election, 2018
| Party | Candidate | Votes | % |
|---|---|---|---|
| PKR | Lim Kit Siang | 80,726 | 69.24 |
| BN | Jason Teoh Sew Hock | 35,862 | 30.76 |
| Total valid votes | | 116,588 | 100.00 |
| Total rejected ballots | | 1,987 | |
| Unreturned ballots | | 204 | |
| Turnout | | 118,779 | 85.89 |
| Registered electors | | 138,299 | |
| Majority | | 44,864 | 38.48 |
This was a new constituency created.
Source(s) "His Majesty's Government Gazette - Notice of Contested Election, Parliament for the State of Johore [P.U. (B) 244/2018]" (PDF). Attorney General's Chambers of Malaysia. 3 May 2018. Archived from the original (PDF) on 2019-12-29. "Federal Government Gazette - Results of Contested Election and Statements of the Poll after the Official Addition of Votes, Parliamentary Constituencies for the State of Johore [P.U. (B) 318/2018]" (PDF). Attorney General's Chambers of Malaysia. 28 May 2018.
