= Petaling (federal constituency) =

Selangor constituency

Defunct federal constituency
- Legislature: Dewan Rakyat
- Constituency created: 1974
- Constituency abolished: 1986
- First contested: 1974
- Last contested: 1982

Petaling was a federal constituency in Selangor, Malaysia, that was represented in the Dewan Rakyat from 1974 to 1986.

The federal constituency was created in the 1974 redistribution and was mandated to return a single member to the Dewan Rakyat under the first past the post voting system.

== History ==
It was abolished in 1986 when it was redistributed.

=== Representation history ===
Members of Parliament for Petaling
Parliament	No	Years	Member	Party	Vote Share
Constituency created from Batu, Damansara and Bungsar
4th	P081	1974-1978	Oh Keng Seng (胡更生)	DAP	14,106; 40.41%
5th	P081	1978-1982	Lim Kit Siang (林吉祥)	DAP	41,017; 62.83%
6th	P081	1982-1986	Yeoh Poh San (杨宝山)	BN (MCA)	42,710; 53.29%
Constituency abolished, split into Petaling Jaya and Puchong

=== State constituency ===
Parliamentary constituency	State constituency						
Parliamentary constituency	1955–59*	1959–1974	1974–1986	1986–1995	1995–2004	2004–2018	2018–present
Petaling			Petaling Jaya				
Petaling			Serdang				
Petaling			Sungei Way				

=== Historical boundaries ===
State Constituency	Area
State Constituency	1974
Petaling Jaya	Bukit Gasing; Kampung Tunku; Petaling Jaya; Sungai Way; Taman SEA
Serdang	Kampung Tengah; Kinrara; Puchong; Serdang; Seri Kembangan
Sungei Way	Bukit Tandang; Kampung Dato Harun; Sungei Way; Taman Medan; Taman Sri Manja

== Election results ==
Malaysian general election, 1982
Party	Candidate	Votes	%	∆%
BN	Yeoh Poh San	42,710	53.29	▲16.12
DAP	Patto Perumal	37,436	46.71	▼16.12
Total valid votes		80,146	100.00	
Total rejected ballots		1,800		
Unreturned ballots		0		
Turnout		81,946	71.44	▼3.15
Registered electors		114,704		
Majority		5,274	6.58	▼19.08
BN gain from DAP		Swing		?

Malaysian general election, 1978
Party	Candidate	Votes	%	∆%
DAP	Lim Kit Siang	41,017	62.83	▲22.42
BN	Yeoh Poh San	24,263	37.17	▲0.30
Total valid votes		65,280	100.00	
Total rejected ballots		2,309		
Unreturned ballots		0		
Turnout		67,589	74.59	▼0.17
Registered electors		90,611		
Majority		16,754	25.66	▲22.12
DAP hold		Swing		

Malaysian general election, 1974
Party	Candidate	Votes	%
DAP	Oh Keng Seng	14,106	40.41
BN	Goh Hock Guan	12,868	36.87
PEKEMAS	Pang Koik My	5,961	17.08
Independent	Lim Kui Sang	1,970	5.64
Total valid votes		34,905	100.00
Total rejected ballots		925	
Unreturned ballots		0	
Turnout		35,830	74.76
Registered electors		48,100	
Majority		1,238	3.54
This was a new constituency created.
