= Ayub Jamil =

Malaysian politician

- أيوب جميل

Exco roles (Johor)
- 2020–2022: Chairman of the Housing and Local Government

Faction represented in Johor State Legislative Assembly
- 2004–2022: Barisan Nasional

Personal details
- Born: 10 June 1959 (age 66) Johor, Malaysia
- Citizenship: Malaysian
- Party: United Malays National Organisation (UMNO)
- Other political affiliations: Barisan Nasional (BN); Perikatan Nasional (PN)
- Occupation: Politician

Ayub bin Jamil (born 10 June 1959) is a Malaysian politician who served as Member of the Johor State Executive Council (EXCO) in the Barisan Nasional (BN) state administration under Menteri Besar Hasni Mohammad from March 2020 to March 2022 and Member of the Johor State Legislative Assembly (MLA) for Rengit from March 2004 to March 2022. He is a member of the United Malays National Organisation (UMNO), a component party of the ruling BN coalition.

== Election results ==
Johor State Legislative Assembly
Year	Constituency	Candidate	Votes	Pct	Opponent(s)	Votes	Pct	Ballots cast	Majority	Turnout
2004	N25 Rengit	Ayub Jamil (UMNO)	7,587	71.64%	Hasanuddin Mohd Yunus (PAS)	3,004	28.36%	10,906	4,583	69.66%
2008	N25 Rengit	Ayub Jamil (UMNO)	8,656	71.94%	Hasanuddin Mohd Yunus (PAS)	3,377	28.06%	12,354	5,279	78.43%
2013	N25 Rengit	Ayub Jamil (UMNO)	10,882	66.88%	Ahmad Kailani Kosnin (PAS)	5,390	33.12%	16,588	5,492	87.00%
2018	N25 Rengit	Ayub Jamil (UMNO)	9,642	55.33%	Malik Faishal Ahmad (PKR)	5,470	31.40%	17,818	4,172	84.00%
2018	N25 Rengit	Ayub Jamil (UMNO)	9,642	55.33%	Mohd Tukiran @ Mohd Tumiran Ahmad (PAS)	2,313	13.27%	17,818	4,172	84.00%
