= Kepong (federal constituency) =

Constituency in Kuala Lumpur, Malaysia

Kepong (P114)
Kuala Lumpur constituency

Federal constituency
- Legislature: Dewan Rakyat
- MP: Lim Lip Eng; PH
- Constituency created: 1974
- First contested: 1974
- Last contested: 2022

Demographics
- Population (2020): 106,199
- Electors (2022): 94,285
- Area (km²): 12
- Pop. density (per km²): 8,849.9

Kepong is one of the 11 federal constituencies in the Federal Territory of Kuala Lumpur, Malaysia, that has been represented in the Dewan Rakyat since 1974. The current Member of Parliament representing the constituency is Lim Lip Eng from the Pakatan Harapan-Democratic Action Party.

This federal constituency was created in the 1974 redistribution and is mandated to return a single member to the Dewan Rakyat under the first past the post voting system.

== Demographics ==
Ethnic breakdown of Kepong's electorate as of 2022
1. Chinese (90.5%)
2. Indian (4.90%)
3. Malay (4.00%)
4. Other ethnicities (0.50%)
Age breakdown of Kepong's electorate as of 2022
1. 18-20 (4.14%)
2. 21-29 (14.9%)
3. 30-39 (16.2%)
4. 40-49 (18.2%)
5. 50-59 (19.4%)
6. 60-69 (15.6%)
7. 70-79 (8.54%)
8. 80-89 (2.73%)
9. above 90 (0.37%)
Gender breakdown of Kepong's electorate as of 2022
1. Male (50.2%)
2. Female (49.8%)

According to the August 2022 Electoral Roll used for the 2022 Malaysian general election, the Kepong constituency has 94,285 registered voters, of whom 4.00% are Malay, 90.5% are Chinese, 4.90% are Indian, and 0.50% are from other ethnic groups. In the 2018 general election, the constituency had 72,696 registered voters. The 2022 general election saw an increase of 21,589 voters, a 29.70% increase. In terms of percentage of voters by ethnic group, the Malay population decreased by 0.94%, the Chinese increased by 1.64%, the Indian population decreased by 1.09%, and the other ethnic groups increased by 0.29%.

Change of electorate in Kepong (by percentage)
Election	Electorate				Voters	Change
Election	Malay	Chinese	Indian	Other	Voters	Change
2022	4.00	90.5	4.90	0.50	94,285	+29.70%
2018	4.94	88.86	5.99	0.21	72,696	+6.85%
2013	4.52	88.44	6.37	0.67	68,035	+11.95%
2008	4.28	90.31	5.3	0.1	60,775	+0.83%
2004	3.5	90.9	5.3	0.33	60,273	-7.21%
1999	5.5	89.8	4	0.7	64,956	+8.06%
1995					60,111	-21.70%
1990					76,766	+6.97%
1986					71,767	-7.14%
1982					77,285	+21.32%
1978					63,703	+84.71%
1974					34,488	－

== History ==
=== Polling districts ===
According to the gazette issued on 31 October 2022, the Kepong constituency has a total of 19 polling districts.

Polling District	Code	Location
Kampung Melayu Kepong	114/00/01	SMK Jinjang; Taman Metropolitan Kepong
Jinjang Tempatan Pertama	114/00/02	SJK (C) Jinjang Utara
Jinjang Tempatan Kedua	114/00/03	SJK (C) Jinjang Tengah 2
Jinjang Tempatan Ketiga	114/00/04	Padang Bersebelahan Dewan Komuniti (Pemadam) Cawangan Jinjang Utara
Jinjang Tempatan Keempat	114/00/05	Padang SK La Salle 1 & 2
Jinjang Tengah	114/00/06	SK La Salle 1 Jinjang; SK La Salle 2 Jinjang
Jinjang Tempatan Utara	114/00/07	SJK (C) Jinjang Tengah 1
Jinjang Utara	114/00/08	SJK (C) Kepong 1
Pekan Kepong	114/00/09	SJK (C) Kepong 2
Taman Kepong	114/00/10	Padang Bola Metro Prima Kepong; Taman Kejiranan Jalan Kuang Bulan
Kepong Baru Barat	114/00/11	SK Kepong Baru
Kepong Baru Tengah	114/00/12	SK Seri Kepong
Kepong Baru Timur	114/00/13	SK Taman Kepong
Kepong Baru Tambahan	114/00/14	SMK Sinar Bintang; Kolej Tingkatan Enam Desa Mahkota
Kepong Utara	114/00/15	SMK Kepong Baru
Kepong Selatan	114/00/16	Dewan Brem SJK (C) Jinjang Selatan
Jinjang Tempatan Kesebelas	114/00/17	SJK (C) Jinjang Selatan (Block A & B)
Jinjang Tempatan Kesepuluh	114/00/18	SJK (C) Jinjang Selatan (Block C, D & E)
Jinjang Tempatan Keduabelas	114/00/19	SMK Raja Abdullah

=== Representation history ===
Members of Parliament for Kepong
Parliament	No	Years	Member	Party	Vote Share
Constituency created from Batu and Setapak
4th	P084	1974–1978	Tan Chee Khoon (陈志勤)	PEKEMAS	9,858; 41.18%
5th	P084	1978–1982	Tan Tiong Hong (陈忠鸿)	BN (GERAKAN)	20,555; 41.57%
6th	P084	1982–1986	Tan Seng Giaw (陈胜尧)	DAP	29,368; 50.51%
7th	P096	1986–1990	Tan Seng Giaw (陈胜尧)	DAP	33,049; 64.81%
8th	P096	1990–1995	Tan Seng Giaw (陈胜尧)	GR (DAP)	38,323; 70.58%
9th	P103	1995–1999	Tan Seng Giaw (陈胜尧)	GR (DAP)	25,075; 55.56%
10th	P103	1999–2004	Tan Seng Giaw (陈胜尧)	BA (DAP)	25,085; 50.77%
11th	P114	2004–2008	Tan Seng Giaw (陈胜尧)	DAP	23,282; 52.07%
12th	P114	2008–2013	Tan Seng Giaw (陈胜尧)	PR (DAP)	35,552; 75.23%
13th	P114	2013–2015	Tan Seng Giaw (陈胜尧)	PR (DAP)	47,837; 82.30%
13th	P114	2015–2018	Tan Seng Giaw (陈胜尧)	PH (DAP)	47,837; 82.30%
14th	P114	2018–2022	Lim Lip Eng (林立迎)	PH (DAP)	56,516; 92.04%
15th	P114	2022–present	Lim Lip Eng (林立迎)	PH (DAP)	64,308; 88.92%

=== Historical boundaries ===
Federal constituency	Area				
Federal constituency	1974	1984	1994	2003	2018
Kepong	Jinjang; Kepong; Sentul; Taman Batu View; Taman Dato Senu	Jinjang; Kepong; Segambut; Taman Batu View; Taman Bukit Maluri	Jinjang; Kepong; Menjalara; Metro Prima; Taman Bukit Maluri	Jinjang; Kepong; Metro Prima; Taman Petaling; Taman Segambut Aman	

=== Local governments and postcode ===
No.	Local Government	Postcode
P114	Kuala Lumpur City Hall	52000, 52100 Kuala Lumpur

== Election results ==
Malaysian general election, 2022
Party	Candidate	Votes	%	∆%
PH	Lim Lip Eng	64,308	88.92	▲88.92
BN	Yap Zheng Hoe	3,227	4.46	▼3.50
PN	Phang Jing Fatt	2,795	3.86	▲3.86
Independent	Yee Poh Ping	1,461	2.02	▼2.72
Heritage	Young Shang Yi	528	0.73	▲0.73
Total valid votes		72,319	100.00	
Total rejected ballots		268		
Unreturned ballots		70		
Turnout		72,657	77.06	▼8.97
Registered electors		94,285		
Majority		61,081	84.46	▲0.38
PH hold		Swing		
Source(s) https://lom.agc.gov.my/ilims/upload/portal/akta/outputp/1753271/PUB%20613%20(2022)%20-%20PARLIMEN%20WP%20KUALA%20LUMPUR.pdf

Malaysian general election, 2018
Party	Candidate	Votes	%	∆%
PKR	Lim Lip Eng	56,516	92.04	▲92.04
BN	Ong Siang Liang	4,888	7.96	▼5.00
Total valid votes		61,404	100.00	
Total rejected ballots		323		
Unreturned ballots		85		
Turnout		61,812	85.03	▼1.08
Registered electors		72,696		
Majority		51,628	84.08	▲14.74
PKR hold		Swing		
Source(s) "His Majesty's Government Gazette - Notice of Contested Election, Parliament for the Federal Territory of Kuala Lumpur [P.U. (B) 240/2018]" (PDF). Attorney General's Chambers of Malaysia. 3 May 2018. "Federal Government Gazette - Results of Contested Election and Statements of the Poll after the Official Addition of Votes, Parliamentary Constituencies for the Federal Territory of Kuala Lumpur [P.U. (B) 314/2018]" (PDF). Attorney General's Chambers of Malaysia. 28 May 2018.

Malaysian general election, 2013
Party	Candidate	Votes	%	∆%
DAP	Tan Seng Giaw @ Tan Chun Tin	47,837	82.30	▲7.07
BN	Chandrakumanan Arumugam	7,530	12.96	▼11.81
Independent	Yee Poh Ping	2,757	4.74	▲4.74
Total valid votes		58,124	100.00	
Total rejected ballots		388		
Unreturned ballots		73		
Turnout		58,585	86.11	▲7.94
Registered electors		68,035		
Majority		40,307	69.34	▲18.86
DAP hold		Swing		
Source(s) "Federal Government Gazette - Notice of Contested Election, Parliament for the Federal Territory of Kuala Lumpur [P.U. (B) 177/2013]" (PDF). Attorney General's Chambers of Malaysia. 26 April 2013. Archived from the original (PDF) on 2018-10-02. "Federal Government Gazette - Results of Contested Election and Statements of the Poll after the Official Addition of Votes, Parliamentary Constituencies for the Federal Territory of Kuala Lumpur [P.U. (B) 218/2013]" (PDF). Attorney General's Chambers of Malaysia. 22 May 2013. Archived from the original (PDF) on 2018-10-02.

Malaysian general election, 2008
Party	Candidate	Votes	%	∆%
DAP	Tan Seng Giaw @ Tan Chun Tin	35,552	75.23	▲23.16
BN	Lau Hoi Keong	11,704	24.77	▼23.16
Total valid votes		47,256	100.00	
Total rejected ballots		212		
Unreturned ballots		40		
Turnout		47,508	78.17	▲3.58
Registered electors		60,775		
Majority		23,848	50.47	▲46.33
DAP hold		Swing		

Malaysian general election, 2004
Party	Candidate	Votes	%	∆%
DAP	Tan Seng Giaw @ Tan Chun Tin	23,282	52.07	▲1.30
BN	Ma Woei Chyi	21,428	47.93	▲0.73
Total valid votes		44,710	100.00	
Total rejected ballots		212		
Unreturned ballots		34		
Turnout		44,956	74.59	▼1.96
Registered electors		60,273		
Majority		1,854	4.14	▲0.57
DAP hold		Swing		

Malaysian general election, 1999
Party	Candidate	Votes	%	∆%
DAP	Tan Seng Giaw @ Tan Chun Tin	25,085	50.77	▼4.79
BN	Ma Woei Chyi	23,319	47.20	▲2.76
Independent	Mano	1,003	2.03	▲2.03
Total valid votes		49,407	100.00	
Total rejected ballots		271		
Unreturned ballots		52		
Turnout		49,730	76.55	▲0.93
Registered electors		64,956		
Majority		1,766	3.57	▼7.56
DAP hold		Swing		

Malaysian general election, 1995
Party	Candidate	Votes	%	∆%
DAP	Tan Seng Giaw @ Tan Chun Tin	25,075	55.56	▼15.02
BN	Tan Poh Eng	20,053	44.44	▲15.02
Total valid votes		45,128	100.00	
Total rejected ballots		270		
Unreturned ballots		56		
Turnout		45,454	75.62	▲4.39
Registered electors		60,111		
Majority		5,022	11.13	▼30.03
DAP hold		Swing		

Malaysian general election, 1990
Party	Candidate	Votes	%	∆%
DAP	Tan Seng Giaw @ Tan Chun Tin	38,323	70.58	▲5.77
BN	Lim Kim Hoe	15,971	29.42	▼3.01
Total valid votes		54,294	100.00	
Total rejected ballots		385		
Unreturned ballots		0		
Turnout		54,679	71.23	▼0.50
Registered electors		76,766		
Majority		22,352	41.16	▲9.09
DAP hold		Swing		

Malaysian general election, 1986
Party	Candidate	Votes	%	∆%
DAP	Tan Seng Giaw @ Tan Chun Tin	33,049	64.81	▲14.30
BN	Lum Weng Keong	16,536	32.43	▼16.01
NASMA	Wong Kim Lin	1,405	2.76	▲2.76
Total valid votes		50,990	100.00	
Total rejected ballots		486		
Unreturned ballots		0		
Turnout		51,476	71.73	▼5.21
Registered electors		71,767		
Majority		16,513	32.07	▲30.05
DAP hold		Swing		

Malaysian general election, 1982
Party	Candidate	Votes	%	∆%
DAP	Tan Seng Giaw @ Tan Chun Tin	29,368	50.51	▲29.84
BN	Kerk Kim Tim @ Kerk Choo Ting	28,163	48.44	▲6.87
Independent	Ishak Ibrahim	613	1.05	▲1.05
Total valid votes		58,144	100.00	
Total rejected ballots		1,321		
Unreturned ballots		0		
Turnout		59,465	76.94	▲0.64
Registered electors		77,285		
Majority		1,205	2.02	▼2.60
DAP gain from BN		Swing		?

Malaysian general election, 1978
Party	Candidate	Votes	%	∆%
BN	Tan Tiong Hong	20,055	41.57	▲3.17
PEKEMAS	Tan Seng Giaw @ Tan Chun Tin	17,827	36.95	▼4.23
DAP	Khoo Sin Geok @ Khoo Sin Tow	9,971	20.67	▲3.10
Independent	Kanda	390	0.81	▲0.81
Total valid votes		48,243	100.00	
Total rejected ballots		363		
Unreturned ballots		0		
Turnout		48,606	76.30	▲3.05
Registered electors		63,703		
Majority		2,228	4.62	▲1.84
BN gain from PEKEMAS		Swing		?

Malaysian general election, 1974
Party	Candidate	Votes	%
PEKEMAS	Tan Chee Khoon	9,858	41.18
BN	Tan Tiong Hong	9,192	38.40
DAP	Chan Kok Kit	4,206	17.57
Independent	George Lim	681	2.84
Total valid votes		23,937	100.00
Total rejected ballots		442	
Unreturned ballots		0	
Turnout		24,379	73.25
Registered electors		34,488	
Majority		666	2.78
Constitutency created.
