= Kota Iskandar (state constituency) =

Political subdivision in Malaysia

Kota Iskandar (N49)
Johor constituency

State constituency
- Legislature: Johor State Legislative Assembly
MLA
Pandak Ahmad
BN
- Constituency created: 2018
- First contested: 2018

Demographics
- Population (2020): 309,865
- Electors: 132,579
- Area (km²): 256

Kota Iskandar is a state constituency in Johor, Malaysia, that is represented in the Johor State Legislative Assembly.

The state constituency was first contested in 2018 and is mandated to return a single Assemblyman to the Johor State Legislative Assembly under the first-past-the-post voting system.

== Demographics ==
As of 2020, Kota Iskandar has a population of 309,865 people.

Ethnic breakdown of Kota Iskandar's electorate as of 2026
1. Malay (49.7%)
2. Chinese (34.1%)
3. Indian (14.0%)
4. Other ethnicities (2.20%)

== History ==
=== Polling districts ===
According to the federal gazette issued on 2 July 2026, the Kota Iskandar constituency has a total of 25 polling districts.

State constituency	Polling District	Code	Location
Kota Iskandar (N49)	Mutiara Rini	162/49/01	SK Taman Mutiara Rini; SMK Taman Mutiara Rini 2; SJK (C) Thorburn
Kota Iskandar (N49)	Kangkar Pulai	162/49/02	SJK (C) Pulai
Kota Iskandar (N49)	Pertanian	162/49/03	SA Tafrijiyyah Taman Universiti
Kota Iskandar (N49)	Kebangsaan	162/49/04	SMK Taman Universiti 2; SK Taman Universiti 4
Kota Iskandar (N49)	Lima Kedai	162/49/05	SJK (C) Ping Ming
Kota Iskandar (N49)	Gelang Patah Utara	162/49/06	SK Gelang Patah; SA Gelang Patah
Kota Iskandar (N49)	Kampung Pulai	162/49/07	SK Kampung Pulai
Kota Iskandar (N49)	Sungai Melayu	162/49/08	SK Sungai Melayu
Kota Iskandar (N49)	Tebing Runtoh	162/49/09	SK Sikijang
Kota Iskandar (N49)	Kampong Pendas	162/49/10	SK Pendas Laut
Kota Iskandar (N49)	Gelang Patah Selatan	162/49/11	SMK Gelang Patah
Kota Iskandar (N49)	Tiram Duku	162/49/12	SK Tiram Duku
Kota Iskandar (N49)	Tanjong Kupang	162/49/13	SK Tanjung Kupang
Kota Iskandar (N49)	Kampong Pok Besar	162/49/14	SK Morni Pok
Kota Iskandar (N49)	Tanjong Adang	162/49/15	SK Tanjong Adang
Kota Iskandar (N49)	Penyiaran	162/49/16	SK Taman Universiti 1
Kota Iskandar (N49)	Kemuliaan	162/49/17	SMK Taman Universiti; SK Taman Universiti 3
Kota Iskandar (N49)	Perubatan	162/49/18	SK Taman Universiti 2
Kota Iskandar (N49)	Pulai Indah	162/49/19	SK Kangkar Pulai; SA Taman Pulai Indah
Kota Iskandar (N49)	Pulai Utama	162/49/20	SA Taman Universiti
Kota Iskandar (N49)	Sri Pulai Perdana	162/49/21	SK Sri Pulai Perdana
Kota Iskandar (N49)	Pulai	162/49/22	SJK (C) Woon Hwa
Kota Iskandar (N49)	Sri Pulai	162/49/23	SK Taman Sri Pulai; Dewan Raya Taman Sri Pulai
Kota Iskandar (N49)	Teratai	162/49/24	SA Taman Seri Pulai
Kota Iskandar (N49)	Nusa Perintis	162/49/25	SK Taman Nusa Perintis; SK Nusantara; SMK Taman Nusa Jaya

=== Representation history ===
Members of the Legislative Assembly for Kota Iskandar
Assembly	No	Years	Member	Party
Constituency created from Nusajaya
14th	N49	2018–2022	Dzulkefly Ahmad	PH (AMANAH)
15th	N49	2022–2026	Pandak Ahmad	BN (UMNO)
16th	N49	2026–present	Pandak Ahmad	BN (UMNO)

== Election results ==
Johor state election, 2026
Party	Candidate	Votes	%	∆%
BN	Pandak Ahmad	52,892	58.43	▲17.64
PH	Dzulkefly Ahmad	31,686	35.01	▲1.91
PN	Anna Pravina Segaran	3,249	3.59	▼18.46
BERSAMA	Sahrudin Omar	2,691	2.97	▲2.97
Total valid votes		90,518	100.00	
Total rejected ballots		997		
Unreturned ballots		92		
Turnout		91,607	69.10	▲18.84
Registered electors		132,579		
Majority		21,206	23.43	▲15.74
BN hold		Swing		?

Johor state election, 2022
Party	Candidate	Votes	%	∆%
BN	Pandak Ahmad	23,133	40.79	▲7.80
PH	Dzulkefly Ahmad	18,773	33.10	▲33.10
PN	Samsudin Ismail	12,503	22.05	▲22.05
PEJUANG	Zaini Abu Bakar	1,308	2.31	▲2.31
Parti Sosialis Malaysia	Arangkannal Rajoo	997	1.76	▲1.76
Total valid votes		56,714	100.00	
Total rejected ballots		1,038		
Unreturned ballots		755		
Turnout		58,507	50.26	▼36.33
Registered electors		116,415		
Majority		4,360	7.69	▼17.68
BN gain from PKR		Swing		?

Johor state election, 2018
Party	Candidate	Votes	%
PKR	Dzulkefly Ahmad	33,455	58.35
BN	Mohammad Khairi Abdul A. Malik	18,912	32.99
PAS	Salleh Uhden @ Sallehuddin Mohd Dahiran	4,966	8.66
Total valid votes		57,333	100.00
Total rejected ballots		920	
Unreturned ballots		82	
Turnout		58,335	86.59
Registered electors		67,371	
Majority		14,543	25.37
This was a new constituency created.
Source(s) Suruhanjaya Pilihan Raya Malaysia The Star
