= Batu (Selangor federal constituency) =

Selangor constituency

Defunct federal constituency
- Legislature: Dewan Rakyat
- Constituency created: 1958
- Constituency abolished: 1974
- First contested: 1959
- Last contested: 1969

Batu was a federal constituency in Selangor, Malaysia, that was represented in the Dewan Rakyat from 1959 to 1974.

The federal constituency was created in the 1958 redistribution and was mandated to return a single member to the Dewan Rakyat under the first past the post voting system.

== History ==
=== Representation history ===
Members of Parliament for Batu
| Parliament | No | Years | Member | Party | Vote Share |
Constituency created from Kuala Lumpur Barat in the state of Selangor
Parliament of the Federation of Malaya
| 1st | P066 | 1959-1963 | Ng Ann Teck (黄汉德) | SF (Lab) | 8,737; 57.69% |
Parliament of Malaysia
| 1st | P066 | 1963-1964 | Ng Ann Teck (黄汉德) | SF (Lab) | 8,737; 57.69% |
| 2nd | P066 | 1964-1968 | Tan Chee Khoon (陈志勤) | SF (Lab) | 10,122; 45.28% |
| 2nd | P066 | 1968-1969 | Tan Chee Khoon (陈志勤) | GERAKAN | 10,122; 45.28% |
| | | 1969-1971 | Parliament was suspended | | |
| 3rd | P066 | 1971-1972 | Tan Chee Khoon (陈志勤) | GERAKAN | 22,720; 72.15% |
| 3rd | P066 | 1972-1974 | Tan Chee Khoon (陈志勤) | PEKEMAS | 22,720; 72.15% |
Constituency abolished, split into Damansara, Petaling, Kepong and Selayang

=== State constituency ===
| Parliamentary constituency | State constituency | | | | | | |
| Parliamentary constituency | 1955–59* | 1959–1974 | 1974–1986 | 1986–1995 | 1995–2004 | 2004–2018 | 2018–present |
|---|---|---|---|---|---|---|---|
| Batu | | Kepong | | | | | |
| Batu | | Penchala | | | | | |

=== Historical boundaries ===
| State Constituency | Area |
| State Constituency | 1959 |
|---|---|
| Kepong | Batu Caves; Kepong; Jinjang; Segambut; Selayang |
| Penchala | Bukit Kiara; Damansara; Kampung Kasipillay; Petaling; Penchala |

== Election results ==
Malaysian general election, 1969
| Party | Candidate | Votes | % | ∆% |
|---|---|---|---|---|
| GERAKAN | Tan Chee Khoon | 22,720 | 72.15 | ▲26.87 |
| Alliance | Yap Chin Kwee | 8,772 | 27.85 | ▼15.87 |
| Total valid votes | | 31,492 | 100.00 | |
| Total rejected ballots | | 1,189 | | |
| Unreturned ballots | | 0 | | |
| Turnout | | 32,681 | 65.12 | ▼7.26 |
| Registered electors | | 50,183 | | |
| Majority | | 13,948 | 44.29 | ▲42.73 |
| GERAKAN gain from Socialist Front | | Swing | | -22.93 |

Malaysian general election, 1964
| Party | Candidate | Votes | % | ∆% |
|---|---|---|---|---|
| Socialist Front | Tan Chee Khoon | 10,122 | 45.28 | ▼12.41 |
| Alliance | Yap Chin Kwee | 9,774 | 43.72 | ▲1.41 |
| PAP | Too Chee Cheong | 2,459 | 11.00 | ▲11.00 |
| Total valid votes | | 22,355 | 100.00 | |
| Total rejected ballots | | 1,023 | | |
| Unreturned ballots | | 0 | | |
| Turnout | | 23,378 | 72.38 | ▼1.15 |
| Registered electors | | 32,297 | | |
| Majority | | 348 | 1.56 | ▼13.82 |
| Socialist Front hold | | Swing | | -6.91 |

Malaysian general election, 1959
| Party | Candidate | Votes | % |
|---|---|---|---|
| Socialist Front | Ng Ann Teck | 8,737 | 57.69 |
| Alliance | Lim Hee Hong | 6,408 | 42.31 |
| Total valid votes | | 15,145 | 100.00 |
| Total rejected ballots | | 164 | |
| Unreturned ballots | | 0 | |
| Turnout | | 15,309 | 73.53 |
| Registered electors | | 20,819 | |
| Majority | | 2,329 | 15.38 |
This was a new constituency created.
