= Bandar Malacca =

Malaysian federal constituency

Malacca constituency

Defunct federal constituency
- Legislature: Dewan Rakyat
- Constituency created: 1958
- Constituency abolished: 1974
- First contested: 1959
- Last contested: 1969

Bandar Malacca was a federal constituency in Malacca, Malaysia, that was represented in the Dewan Rakyat from 1959 to 1974.

The federal constituency was created in the 1974 redistribution and was mandated to return a single member to the Dewan Rakyat under the first past the post voting system.

== History ==
It was abolished in 1974 when it was redistributed.

=== Representation history ===
Members of Parliament for Bandar Malacca
Parliament	No	Years	Member	Party	Vote Share
Constituency created Malacca Central
Parliament of the Federation of Malaya
1st	P086	1959-1963	Tan Kee Gak (陈期岳)	Malayan	9,396; 52.69%
Parliament of Malaysia
1st	P086	1963-1964	Tan Kee Gak (陈期岳)	Alliance (MCA)	9,396; 52.69%
2nd	P086	1964-1969	Tan Kee Gak (陈期岳)	Alliance (MCA)	13,789; 49.41%
		1969-1971	Parliament was suspended		
3rd	P086	1971-1974	Lim Kit Siang (林吉祥)	DAP	18,562; 60.80%
Constituency abolished, renamed to Kota Melaka

=== State constituency ===
Parliamentary constituency	State constituency						
Parliamentary constituency	1955–59*	1959–1974	1974–1986	1986–1995	1995–2004	2004–2018	2018–present
Bandar Malacca		Kota Barat					
Bandar Malacca		Kota Selatan					
Bandar Malacca		Kota Tengah					
Bandar Malacca		Kota Timor					
Bandar Malacca		Kota Utara					

=== Historical boundaries ===
State Constituency	Area
State Constituency	1959–1974
Kota Barat	Kampung Limbongan; Klebang Jaya; Taman Kenaga; Taman Siantan; Tranquerah
Kota Selatan	Jonker Street; Jalan Parameswara; Kota Melaka; Kubu; Melaka Raya
Kota Tengah	Kampung Chetti; Kampung Empat; Kampung Hulu; Kampung Lama; Kampung Pengkalan Rama
Kota Timor	Bandar Hilir; Bukit Cina; Bukit Senjuang; Melaka Raya; Perkampungan Portugis
Kota Utara	Durian Daun; Kampung Mata Kuching; Kampung Pengkalan Rama; Peringgit; Taman Bendahara

== Election results ==
Malaysian general election, 1969: Bandar Malacca
Party	Candidate	Votes	%	∆%
DAP	Lim Kit Siang	18,562	60.80	▲60.80
Alliance	Koh Kim Leng	7,346	24.06	▼25.35
Parti Rakyat Malaysia	Hasnul Abdul Hadi	4,621	15.14	▲15.14
Total valid votes		30,529	100.00	
Total rejected ballots		955		
Unreturned ballots		0		
Turnout		31,484	73.77	▼11.83
Registered electors		42,679		
Majority		11,216	36.74	▲25.52
DAP gain from Alliance		Swing		?

Malaysian general election, 1964: Bandar Malacca
Party	Candidate	Votes	%	∆%
Alliance	Tan Kee Gak	13,789	49.41	▲3.58
Socialist Front	Yeoh Ho Huat	10,658	38.19	▲38.19
PAP	Chua Sian Chin	3,461	12.40	▲12.40
Total valid votes		27,908	100.00	
Total rejected ballots		467		
Unreturned ballots		0		
Turnout		28,375	85.60	▲5.21
Registered electors		33,148		
Majority		3,131	11.22	▲4.36
Alliance gain from Malayan Party		Swing		?

Malayan general election, 1959: Bandar Malacca
Party	Candidate	Votes	%
Malayan Party	Tan Kee Gak	9,396	52.69
Alliance	Wong Koon Yoon	8,173	45.83
Independent	Yeoh Ho Huat	265	1.49
Total valid votes		17,834	100.00
Total rejected ballots		122	
Unreturned ballots		0	
Turnout		17,956	80.39
Registered electors		22,337	
Majority		1,223	6.86
This was a new constituency created.
