= Gelang Patah (federal constituency) =

Johor constituency

Defunct federal constituency
- Legislature: Dewan Rakyat
- Constituency created: 1994
- Constituency abolished: 2018
- First contested: 1995
- Last contested: 2013

Gelang Patah was a federal constituency in Johor, Malaysia, that was represented in the Dewan Rakyat from 1995 to 2018.

The federal constituency was created in the 1994 redistribution and was mandated to return a single member to the Dewan Rakyat under the first past the post voting system.

== History ==
It was abolished in 2018 when it was redistributed.

=== Representation history ===
Members of Parliament for Gelang Patah
Parliament	No	Years	Member	Party	Vote Share
Constituency created from Pulai
9th	P143	1995-1999	Chang See Ten (张诗登)	BN (MCA)	35,459; 75.93%
10th	P143	1999-2004	Chang See Ten (张诗登)	BN (MCA)	40,752; 74.50%
11th	P162	2004-2008	Tan Ah Eng (曾亚英)	BN (MCA)	41,001; 81.45%
12th	P162	2008-2013	Tan Ah Eng (曾亚英)	BN (MCA)	33,630; 57.58%
13th	P162	2013-2015	Lim Kit Siang (林吉祥)	PR (DAP)	54,284; 57.87%
13th	P162	2015–2018	Lim Kit Siang (林吉祥)	PH (DAP)	54,284; 57.87%
Constituency abolished, renamed to Iskandar Puteri

=== State constituency ===
Parliamentary constituency	State constituency						
Parliamentary constituency	1954–59*	1959–1974	1974–1986	1986–1995	1995–2004	2004–2018	2018–present
Gelang Patah						Nusa Jaya	
Gelang Patah					Skudai		
Gelang Patah					Tanjong Kupang		

=== Historical boundaries ===
State Constituency	Area	
State Constituency	1994	2003
Nusa Jaya		Gelang Patah; Kangkar Pulai; Lima Kedai; Tanjung Pelepas; Ulu Choh
Skudai	Kangkar Pulai; Senai Airport City; Skudai; Taman Tun Ungku Aminah; Taman Universiti	Senai Airport City; Skudai; Taman Impian Emas; Taman Tampoi Indah; Taman Tun Ungku Aminah
Tanjong Kupang	Gelang Patah; Lima Kedai; Perling; Tanjung Pelepas; Ulu Choh	

== Election results ==
Malaysian general election, 2013
Party	Candidate	Votes	%	∆%
DAP	Lim Kit Siang	54,284	57.87	▲22.37
BN	A. Ghani Othman	39,522	42.13	▼15.45
Total valid votes		93,806	100.00	
Total rejected ballots		1,059		
Unreturned ballots		203		
Turnout		95,068	89.08	▲11.89
Registered electors		106,726		
Majority		14,762	15.74	▲0.58
DAP gain from BN		Swing		?
Source(s) "Federal Government Gazette - Notice of Contested Election, Parliament for the State of Johore [P.U. (B) 181/2013]" (PDF). Attorney General's Chambers of Malaysia. 26 April 2013. "Federal Government Gazette - Results of Contested Election and Statements of the Poll after the Official Addition of Votes, Parliamentary Constituencies for the State of Johore [P.U. (B) 222/2013]" (PDF). Attorney General's Chambers of Malaysia. 22 May 2013.

Malaysian general election, 2008
Party	Candidate	Votes	%	∆%
BN	Tan Ah Eng	33,630	57.58	▼23.87
PKR	Zaliha Mustafa	24,779	42.42	▲23.87
Total valid votes		58,409	100.00	
Total rejected ballots		2,244		
Unreturned ballots		75		
Turnout		60,728	77.19	▲2.50
Registered electors		78,676		
Majority		8,851	15.16	▼47.74
BN hold		Swing		

Malaysian general election, 2004
Party	Candidate	Votes	%	∆%
BN	Tan Ah Eng	41,001	81.45	▲6.95
PKR	Song Sing Kwee	9,335	18.55	▲18.55
Total valid votes		50,336	100.00	
Total rejected ballots		1,903		
Unreturned ballots		58		
Turnout		52,297	74.69	▼0.49
Registered electors		70,023		
Majority		31,666	62.90	▼13.90
BN hold		Swing		

Malaysian general election, 1999
Party	Candidate	Votes	%	∆%
BN	Teu Si @ Chang See Ten	40,752	74.50	▼1.43
DAP	Norman Fernandez	13,947	25.50	▲25.50
Total valid votes		54,699	100.00	
Total rejected ballots		1,243		
Unreturned ballots		118		
Turnout		56,060	75.18	▼2.64
Registered electors		74,560		
Majority		26,805	49.00	▼2.86
BN hold		Swing		

Malaysian general election, 1995
Party	Candidate	Votes	%
BN	Teu Si @ Chang See Ten	35,459	75.93
Parti Rakyat Malaysia	A. Razak Ahmad	11,240	24.07
Total valid votes		46,699	100.00
Total rejected ballots		2,486	
Unreturned ballots		91	
Turnout		49,276	77.82
Registered electors		63,323	
Majority		24,219	51.86
This was a new constituency created.
