= Chen Man Hin =

Malaysian politician (1924–2022)

Yang Berusaha Dr Chen Man Hin
- 曾敏兴

1st Life Advisor of the Democratic Action Party
- In office 3 December 1999 – 17 August 2022
- Secretary-General: Kerk Kim Hock; (1999–2002, 2002–2004); Chong Eng; (acting: 2002); M. Kulasegaran; (acting: 2004); Lim Guan Eng; (2004–2022); Anthony Loke; (2022)
- National Chairman: Lim Kit Siang; (1999–2004); Karpal Singh; (2004–2014); Tan Kok Wai; (2014–2022); Lim Guan Eng; (2022)
- Preceded by: Position established
- Succeeded by: Position abolished

1st National Chairman of the Democratic Action Party
- In office 18 March 1966 – 3 December 1999
- Secretary-General: Devan Nair; (1966–1967); Goh Hock Guan; (1967–1969); Fan Yew Teng; (acting:1969–1970); Lim Kit Siang; (1970–1999)
- Preceded by: Position established
- Succeeded by: Lim Kit Siang

Member of the Negeri Sembilan State Legislative Assembly for Rahang
- In office 11 December 1965 – 26 April 1982 (Assembly suspended: 13 May 1969 – 20 February 1971)
- Preceded by: Han Hiu Fong
- Succeeded by: Hu Sepang

Member of the Malaysian Parliament for Seremban
- In office 19 November 1983 – 21 October 1990
- Preceded by: Lee San Choon
- Succeeded by: Yim Chee Chong
- Majority: 6,393 (1983); 1,064 (1986)
- In office 14 September 1974 – 26 April 1982
- Preceded by: Position established
- Succeeded by: Lee San Choon
- Majority: 3,339 (1974); 8,073 (1978)

Member of the Malaysian Parliament for Seremban Timor
- In office 10 May 1969 – 14 September 1974
- Preceded by: Quek Kai Dong
- Succeeded by: Position abolished
- Majority: 5,402 (1969)

Personal details
- Born: Chen Man Hin; 14 November 1924 Republic of China
- Died: 17 August 2022 (aged 97) Seremban, Negeri Sembilan, Malaysia
- Party: People's Action Party (PAP); (1964–1965); Independent; (1965–1966); Democratic Action Party (DAP); (1966–2022)
- Other political affiliations: Gagasan Rakyat (GR); (1990–1996); Barisan Alternatif (BA); (1998–2004); Pakatan Rakyat (PR); (2008–2015); Pakatan Harapan (PH); (2015–2022)
- Occupation: Politician
- Profession: Physician
- Website: chenmanhin.blogspot.com

Chen Man Hin (Chinese: 曾敏兴; 14 November 1924 – 17 August 2022) was a Malaysian politician and physician. He was a founding member of the Democratic Action Party (DAP) and served as its inaugural chairman from 1966 to 1999. He later served as its life advisor until his death in 2022.

He served as Member of Parliament (MP) for Seremban Timor (1969–1974), and later for Seremban (1974–1982, 1983–1990). He also served as a member of the Negeri Sembilan State Legislative Assembly (MLA) for Rahang from 1965 to 1982.

== Early life ==
A Hakka Chinese, Chen Man Hin was born in China and sailed to British Malaya (present day Malaysia) at a young age, before the Second World War. In 1946, he studied at the King Edward VII Medical College in Singapore and graduated in 1952. He then worked as a doctor in Singapore and at a hospital in Seremban, Negeri Sembilan until 1956, before opening his own clinic.

== Political career ==
His first electoral victory was a 1965 by-election for the Rahang state legislative assembly seat in Negeri Sembilan as an independent using the symbol of a cherry blossom. The Democratic Action Party (DAP) was still in the process of creation at the time, and was only registered on 18 March, following which Chen became its inaugural chairman.

Chen Man Hin was one of the founders of the party in Seremban with other leaders such as Lim Kit Siang, Tan Seng Giaw, Karpal Singh and Hu Sepang. The party headquarters was then located at Choo Teik Building, Seremban. In the 1980s, Negeri Sembilan was a stronghold of the DAP.

He won his first federal parliamentary seat in Seremban Timor, Negeri Sembilan in 1969 as a member of the DAP against Barisan Nasional (BN).

He subsequently won the elections of 1978 and 1986. In 1986, DAP won 24 parliamentary seats and 56 state seats.

In the 1999 general elections, he lost in Rasah, Negeri Sembilan to Goh Siow Huat from Barisan Nasional. The party performed below expectations that year and the results were called "catastrophic" by Lim Kit Siang. Chen eventually resigned as Chairman of DAP and was replaced by Lim.

== Death ==
Chen died on 17 August 2022 at the age of 97. According to DAP secretary-general Anthony Loke, Chen died in his sleep. Loke also revealed that he had been making trips to the hospital two months prior and had been infected with pneumonia prior to his death.

== Legacy ==
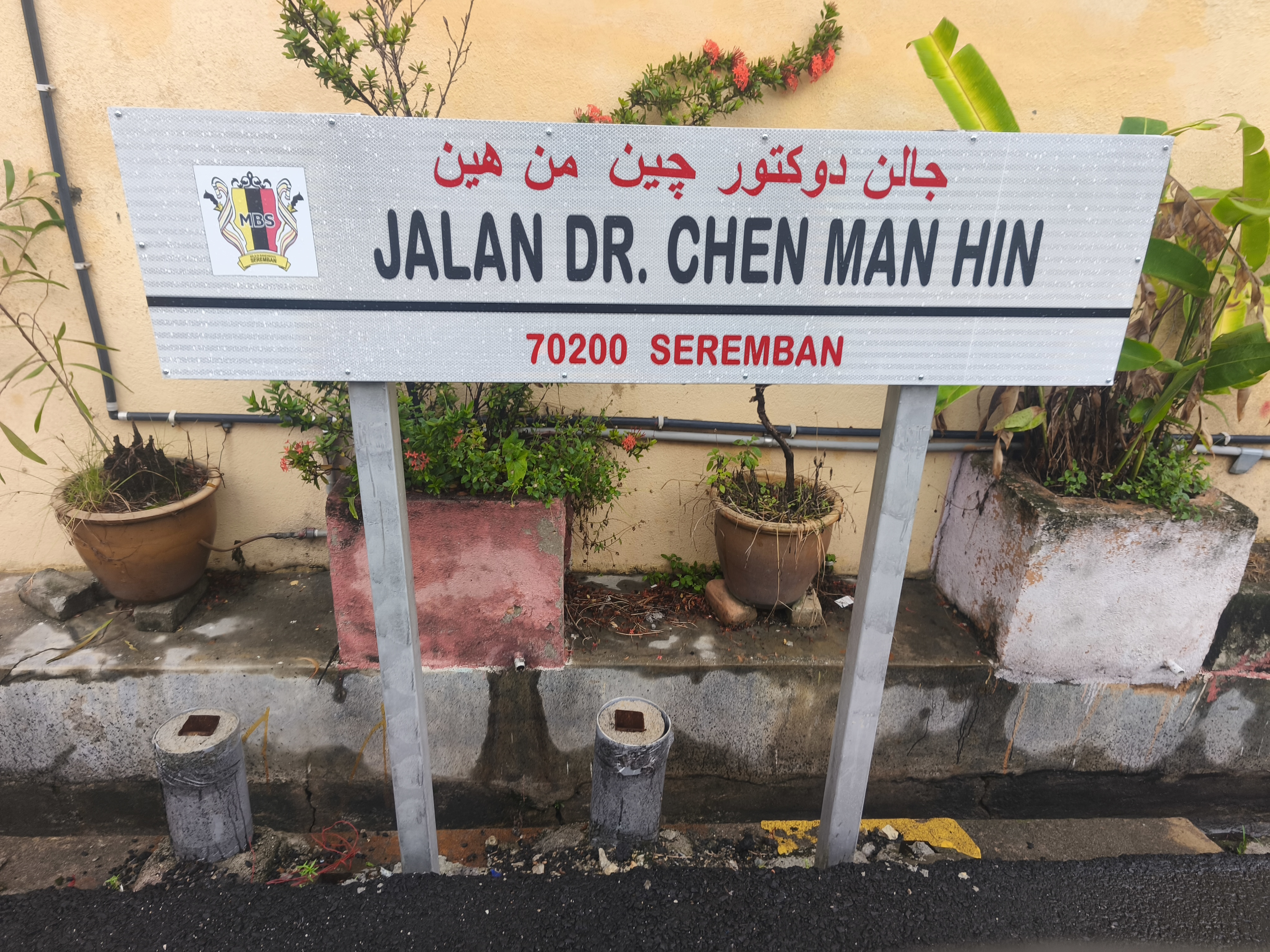
Jalan Dr. Chen Man Hin in Seremban

A major road in Seremban, Jalan Temiang, was renamed to Jalan Dr. Chen Man Hin in honour of his contributions.

== Election results ==
Negeri Sembilan State Legislative Assembly
Year	Constituency	Candidate	Votes	Pct	Opponent(s)	Votes	Pct	Ballots cast	Majority	Turnout
1965	N07 Rahang	Chen Man Hin (IND)	3,576	52.26%	Kan Kok Kwan (MCA)	2,036	29.75%	6,845	1,540	69.14%
1965	N07 Rahang	Chen Man Hin (IND)	3,576	52.26%	Yim Chee Chong (LPM)	1,231	17.99%	6,845	1,540	69.14%
1969	N07 Rahang	Chen Man Hin (DAP)	4,850	70.40%	Low Loo Toh (MCA)	1,705	24.75%	7,141	3,145	73.88%
1969	N07 Rahang	Chen Man Hin (DAP)	4,850	70.40%	Tan Kee Jon (UMCO)	334	4.85%	7,141	3,145	73.88%
1974	N10 Rahang	Chen Man Hin (DAP)	6,210	64.23%	Oh Her Sang (MCA)	3,459	35.77%	10,284	2,751	76.80%
1978	N10 Rahang	Chen Man Hin (DAP)								

Parliament of Malaysia
Year	Constituency	Candidate	Votes	Pct	Opponent(s)	Votes	Pct	Ballots cast	Majority	Turnout
1969	P080 Seremban Timor	Chen Man Hin (DAP)	13,475	60.32%	Wong Sen Chow (MCA)	8,073	36.14%	22,339	5,402	72.14%
1969	P080 Seremban Timor	Chen Man Hin (DAP)	13,475	60.32%	Chin See Yin (UMCO)	791	3.54%	22,339	5,402	72.14%
1974	P091 Seremban	Chen Man Hin (DAP)	16,280	55.71%	Wong Seng Chow (MCA)	12,941	44.29%	29,221	3,339	74.33%
1978	P091 Seremban	Chen Man Hin (DAP)	23,057	60.61%	Gan Kong Seng (MCA)	14,984	39.39%	38,041	8,073	71.88%
1982	P091 Seremban	Chen Man Hin (DAP)	22,413	49.07%	Lee San Choon (MCA)	23,258	50.93%	45,671	845	77.22%
1983	P091 Seremban	Chen Man Hin (DAP)	23,897	57.72%	Rosie Teh (MCA)	17,504	42.28%	41,401	6,393	67.98%
1986	P107 Seremban	Chen Man Hin (DAP)	23,577	51.15%	Yim Chee Chong (MCA)	22,513	48.85%	46,090	1,064	71.47%
1990	P107 Seremban	Chen Man Hin (DAP)	26,797	49.93%	Yim Chee Chong (MCA)	26,874	50.07%	53,671	77	72.93%
1995	P118 Rasah	Chen Man Hin (DAP)	20,775	40.17%	Wong See Wah (MCA)	30,946	59.83%	53,732	10,171	73.53%
1999	P118 Rasah	Chen Man Hin (DAP)	27,255	48.76%	Goh Siow Huat (MCA)	28,641	51.24%	55,896	1,386	73.44%
