= Seremban (disambiguation) =

Seremban may refer to:

- Seremban
- Seremban District
- Seremban (federal constituency), represented in the Dewan Rakyat
- Seremban Barat (federal constituency), formerly represented in the Dewan Rakyat (1959–74)
- Seremban Timor (federal constituency), formerly represented in the Dewan Rakyat (1959–74)
- Seremban (state constituency), formerly represented in the Negeri Sembilan State Council (1955–59)
