= Segamat Selatan =

Johor constituency

Defunct federal constituency
- Legislature: Dewan Rakyat
- Constituency created: 1958
- Constituency abolished: 1974
- First contested: 1959
- Last contested: 1969

Segamat Selatan was a federal constituency in Johor, Malaysia, that was represented in the Dewan Rakyat from 1959 to 1974.

The federal constituency was created in the 1974 redistribution and was mandated to return a single member to the Dewan Rakyat under the first past the post voting system.

== History ==
It was abolished in 1974 when it was redistributed.

=== Representation history ===
Members of Parliament for Segamat Selatan
Parliament	No	Years	Member	Party	Vote Share
Constituency split from Segamat
Parliament of the Federation of Malaya
1st	P090	1959-1963	Teoh Chze Chong (张子宗)	Alliance (MCA)	7,828; 61.69%
Parliament of Malaysia
1st	P090	1963-1964	Teoh Chze Chong (张子宗)	Alliance (MCA)	7,828; 61.69%
2nd	P090	1964-1969	Lee San Choon (李三春)	Alliance (MCA)	11,355; 63.33%
		1969-1971	Parliament was suspended		
3rd	P090	1971-1973	Lee San Choon (李三春)	Alliance (MCA)	14,470; 73.63%
3rd	P090	1973-1974	Lee San Choon (李三春)	BN (MCA)	14,470; 73.63%
Constituency abolished, split into Segamat, Labis, Keluang and Ayer Hitam

=== State constituency ===
Parliamentary constituency	State constituency						
Parliamentary constituency	1954–59*	1959–1974	1974–1986	1986–1995	1995–2004	2004–2018	2018–present
Segamat Selatan		Bekok					
Segamat Selatan		Labis					

=== Historical boundaries ===
State Constituency	Area
State Constituency	1959
Bekok	Bekok; Chaah; Chamek; Nyior; Paloh
Labis	Ayer Panas; Kemelah; Labis; Pemanis; Tenang

== Election results ==
Malaysian general election, 1969: Segamat Selatan
Party	Candidate	Votes	%	∆%
Alliance	Lee San Choon	14,470	73.63	▲10.30
Independent	Abdul Rahman Abdul Rasool	5,183	26.37	▲26.37
Total valid votes		19,653	100.00	
Total rejected ballots		1,652		
Unreturned ballots		0		
Turnout		21,305	71.66	▼10.77
Registered electors		29,730		
Majority		9,287	47.26	▲11.57
Alliance hold		Swing		

Malaysian general election, 1964: Segamat Selatan
Party	Candidate	Votes	%	∆%
Alliance	Lee San Choon	11,355	63.33	▲1.64
Socialist Front	Chiu Siu Meng	4,956	27.64	▼10.67
UDP	Tan Luan Hong	1,619	9.03	▲9.03
Total valid votes		17,930	100.00	
Total rejected ballots		763		
Unreturned ballots		0		
Turnout		18,693	82.43	▼0.16
Registered electors		22,678		
Majority		6,399	35.69	▲12.31
Alliance hold		Swing		

Malayan general election, 1959: Segamat Selatan
Party	Candidate	Votes	%
Alliance	Teoh Chze Chong	7,828	61.69
Socialist Front	Lim Chin Kean	4,862	38.31
Total valid votes		12,690	100.00
Total rejected ballots		151	
Unreturned ballots		0	
Turnout		12,841	82.59
Registered electors		15,548	
Majority		2,966	23.38
This was a new constituency created.
