= Ean Yong Tin Sin =

Malaysian politician

Yang Berbahagia Dato' Ean Yong Tin Sin DBNS
- 欧阳丁清

Member of the Negeri Sembilan State Legislative Assembly for Lukut
- In office 8 March 2008 – 9 May 2018
- Preceded by: Yeow Chai Thiam (BN–MCA)
- Succeeded by: Choo Ken Hwa (PH–DAP)
- Majority: 2,418 (2008); 3,954 (2013)

Personal details
- Party: Democratic Action Party (DAP)
- Other political affiliations: Pakatan Harapan (PH)
- Children: Ean Yong Hian Wah (son)
- Occupation: Politician

Chinese name
- Traditional Chinese: 歐陽丁清
- Simplified Chinese: 欧阳丁清
- Hanyu Pinyin: Ōuyáng Dīngqīng

Ean Yong Tin Sin (born 1946/1947) is a Malaysian politician who served as Member of the Negeri Sembilan State Legislative Assembly (MLA) for Lukut from March 2008 to May 2018. He is a member of Democratic Action Party (DAP), a component party of the Pakatan Harapan (PH) and formerly Pakatan Rakyat (PR) coalitions. He is also the father of Ean Yong Hian Wah, Chairman of the Port Klang Authority (PKA), Executive Chairman of the Orgabio Holdings Berhad and State Vice Chairman of DAP of Selangor.

Ean Yong joined DAP in 1974 and contested in an election in 1978. In 2002 he founded Orgabio Manufacturing, a producer of instant coffee. The company made its initial public offering on the Bursa Malaysia in 2022, rising roughly 16% in its first day of trading.

Ean Yong has one daughter and five sons, including Ean Yong Hian Wah, who is also a Democratic Action Party politician in Selangor.

== Election results ==
Negeri Sembilan State Legislative Assembly
Year	Constituency	Candidate	Votes	Pct	Opponent(s)	Votes	Pct	Ballots cast	Majority	Turnout
1978	N01 Kuala Klawang	Ean Yong Tin Sin (DAP)			Lim Kim Kee (MCA)					
2004	N01 Chennah	Ean Yong Tin Sin (DAP)	2,573	38.54%	Lim Yong @ Lim Chen (MCA)	4,104	61.46%	6,970	1,531	70.16%
2008	N30 Lukut	Ean Yong Tin Sin (DAP)	5,579	63.83%	Cheok Leong Huat (MCA)	3,161	36.17%	8,923	2,418	79.13%
2013	N30 Lukut	Ean Yong Tin Sin (DAP)	7,692	67.30%	Yeong Seng Wong (MCA)	3,738	32.70%	11,650	3,954	86.53%

Selangor State Legislative Assembly
Year	Constituency	Candidate	Votes	Pct	Opponent(s)	Votes	Pct	Ballots cast	Majority	Turnout
1982	N17 Kajang	Ean Yong Tin Sin (DAP)	6,053	41.61%	Lim Ann Koon (MCA)	8,494	58.39%	14,761	2,441	77.11%
1986	N41 Sungai Pelik	Ean Yong Tin Sin (DAP)	2,997	31.42%	Ng Soon Por (MCA)	6,540	68.58%	9,932	3,543	74.35%

== Honours ==
- Negeri Sembilan
  - Knight of the Order of Loyal Service to Negeri Sembilan (DBNS) – Dato' (2021)
