= 1983 Seremban by-election =

← 1982	19 November 1983	1986 →

P091 seat in the Dewan Rakyat
- Turnout: 21,236
	First party	Second party
	DAP	BN
Candidate	Chen Man Hin	Rosie Teh
Party	DAP	MCA
Alliance		BN
Popular vote	23,897	17,504
Percentage	57.72%	42.28%
MP before election
Lee San Choon
BN (MCA)
Elected MP
Chen Man Hin
DAP

The Seremban by-election was a parliamentary by-election that was held on 19 November 1983 in the state of Negeri Sembilan, Malaysia. The Seremban seat fell vacant following the resignation of its member of parliament, Minister of Transport and Malaysian Chinese Association (MCA) national president, Lee San Choon. Lee won the seat in 1982 Malaysian general election against incumbent MP Chen Man Hin of Democratic Action Party with slim majority of 845.

Chen Man Hin wrest back the seat, defeating Rosie Teh of Barisan Nasional with a huge majority of 6,393 votes. The constituency had 60,899 voters.

== Nomination ==
DAP chairmen, Chen Man Hin challenged MCA leaders, acting president Neo Yee Pan and state assemblymen, Oh Her San to run. PAS headquarters did not receive request from its state chapter to contest the by-election.

On Nomination Day, Barisan Nasional nominated former Seremban Municipal councilor, Rosie Teh. Democratic Action Party renominated its chairmen and former Seremban MP, Chen Man Hin.

== Results ==
Malaysian general by-election, 19 November 1983: Seremban Upon the resignation of incumbent, Lee San Choon
Party	Candidate	Votes	%	∆%
DAP	Chen Man Hin	23,897	57.72	▲6.79
BN	Rosie Teh	17,504	42.28	▼6.79
Total valid votes		41,401	100.00	
Total rejected ballots				
Unreturned ballots				
Turnout				
Registered electors		60,899		
Majority		6,393	15.44	▲13.58
DAP gain from BN		Swing		?
