= 1965 Rahang by-election =

Malaysian state assembly election

- 11 December 1965

Rahang seat in Negeri Sembilan State Legislative Assembly
	IND	All	SF
Candidate	Chen Man Hin	Lan Kok Kwan	Yim Chee Chong
Party	Independent	MCA	LPM
Alliance		Alliance	Socialist Front
Popular vote	3,576	2,038	1,231
Percentage	NA	NA	NA
MLA before election
Han Hiu Fong
Alliance (MCA)
Elected MLA
Chen Man Hin
Independent

The Rahang by-election was a state assembly by-election that was held on 11 December 1965 in the state of Negeri Sembilan, Malaysia. The Rahang seat fell vacant following the death of its MCA MLA Mr. Han Hiu Fong, which won the seat in 1964 Malaysian general election.

Independent politician Chen Man Hin, won the by election, defeating Lan Kok Kwan of Alliance and Yim Chee Chong of Socialist Front with a majority of 1,538 votes.

== Nomination ==
On nomination day, three candidates were confirmed. Alliance nominated MCA candidate, Lan Kok Kwan. Socialist Front nominated Negeri Sembilan LPM secretary, Yim Chee Chong and yet to be registered Democratic Action Party candidate, standing in as Independent politician, Chen Man Hin.

== Results ==
Malaysian general by-election, 11 December 1965: Rahang Upon the death of incumbent, Han Hiu Fong
Party	Candidate	Votes	%	∆%
Independent	Chen Man Hin	3,576	NA	
Alliance	Lan Kok Kwan	2,038	NA	
Socialist Front	Yim Chee Chong	1,231	NA	
Total valid votes		6,845	NA	
Total rejected ballots		69	NA	
Unreturned ballots		0		
Turnout		NA	NA	
Registered electors		9,965		
Majority		1,538	NA	NA
Independent gain		Swing		{{{3}}}
