= Siau Meow Kong =

Malaysian politician

Yang Berhormat Tuan Siau Meow Kong MLA
- 萧妙光

Member of the Negeri Sembilan State Legislative Assembly for Rahang
- Incumbent
- Assumed office 12 August 2023
- Preceded by: Mary Josephine Pritam Singh (PH–DAP)
- Majority: 6,432 (2023)

Personal details
- Born: Siau Meow Kong; 1972 (age 53–54) Titi, Jelebu, Negeri Sembilan, Malaysia
- Party: Democratic Action Party (DAP)
- Other political affiliations: Pakatan Harapan (PH)
- Occupation: Politician

Siau Meow Kong (simplified Chinese: 萧妙光; traditional Chinese: 蕭妙光; pinyin: Xiāo Miàoguāng; born 1972) is a Malaysian politician who has served as Member of the Negeri Sembilan State Legislative Assembly (MLA) for Rahang since August 2023. He is a member and State Treasurer of Negeri Sembilan of the Democratic Action Party (DAP), a component party of the Pakatan Harapan (PH) coalition.

== Election results ==
Negeri Sembilan State Legislative Assembly
Year	Constituency	Candidate	Votes	Pct	Opponent(s)	Votes	Pct	Ballots cast	Majority	Turnout
2023	N22 Rahang	Siau Meow Kong (DAP)	9,868	74.17%	Lee Boon Shian (GERAKAN)	3,436	25.83%	13,476	6,432	66.77%
