= Lee San Choon =

Malaysian businessman and politician (1935–2023)

Yang Berbahagia Tan Sri Dato' Lee San Choon PMN SPMJ SSIJ KMN
- 李三春
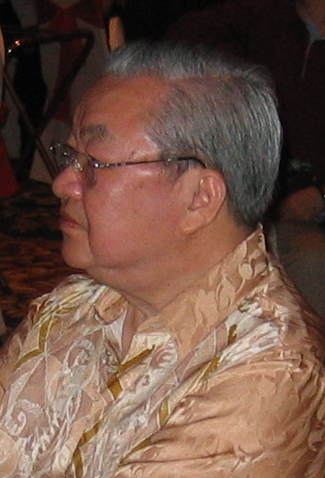
- Lee in 2006

4th President of the Malaysian Chinese Association (MCA)
- In office August 1975 – 25 March 1983
- Preceded by: Tan Siew Sin
- Succeeded by: Tan Koon Swan

Ministerial roles
- 1964–1969: Parliamentary Secretary of Labour
- 1969–1971: Deputy Minister with Special Functions
- 1971–1973: Assistant Minister of Labour
- 1973–1974: Minister of Technology, Research and Coordination of New Villages
- 1974–1978: Minister of Labour and Manpower
- 1978–1979: Minister of Works and Public Amenities
- 1979–1983: Minister of Transport

Faction represented in Dewan Rakyat
- 1959–1974: Alliance Party
- 1974–1983: Barisan Nasional

Personal details
- Born: Lee Soon Seng; 24 March 1935 Pekan, Pahang, Federated Malay States, British Malaya (now Malaysia)
- Died: 3 March 2023 (aged 87) Kuala Lumpur, Malaysia
- Party: Malayan Chinese Association (MCA) (1957 – 2023)
- Other political affiliations: Barisan Nasional (BN)
- Spouse: Mok Thye Yuen (m. 1962)
- Children: 2
- Occupation: Businessman; politician

Lee San Choon (Chinese: 李三春; pinyin: Lǐ Sānchūn; 24 March 1935 – 3 March 2023) was a Malaysian politician and businessman. He was the fourth president of Malaysian Chinese Association (MCA), a major component party of the ruling coalition Barisan Nasional (BN) from 1975 to 1983. He led the party in three general elections in Malaysia, most successfully in the 1982 general election. He held various ministerial posts in the cabinet of the Malaysian government from 1969 to 1983, such as Labour and Manpower Minister, Works and Public Utilities Minister, as well as Transport Minister.

== Early life ==
Lee San Choon was born on 24 March 1935 in Pekan, Pahang to Lee Debin (Chinese: 李德斌) and Yang Zhenling (Chinese: 楊貞齡), immigrant parents from Tianmen, Hubei in China. The third of six children, he lost his mother at the age of ten, and he had five other half-siblings after his father remarried.

Lee had his early education in a Chinese-medium school, Chung Hwa School in Pekan, before being transferred to Sultan Ahmad School for a year of English education. The family moved when he was 12 to Johor Bahru in Johor, where he started his secondary education at the English College. After obtaining his Cambridge GCE O-Level, he taught English at a primary school in Geylang, Singapore. He completed his A-Level in 1955, and although he had intended to continue his education abroad, family financial constraints forced him to abandon the plan. He held a minor position in the government's Social Welfare Department, then worked as a clerk in a textile factory.

== Political career ==
=== Early career ===
Lee San Choon joined the Malayan Chinese Association in 1957. He was elected a member of parliament in the Kluang Utara parliamentary seat in the 1959 Malayan general election, winning the former socialist stronghold by a majority of 1,458 votes, and became the youngest MP in Malaya at the age of 24. After Kluang Utara, he represented the Segamat Selatan constituency from 1964 to 1974 and Segamat until 1982. He was elected Chairman of MCA Youth in 1962. He caused a stir when he urged the leaders of MCA to resign in 1963. In 1965, MCA Youth supported the campaign to make Chinese a national language. Due to the political sensitivity of the issue, he offered to resign but was persuaded to stay. In 1968, as MCA Youth leader, he was involved in the creation of the Koperatif Serbaguna Malaysia Bhd (KSM), a business organization based on the cooperative principle.

After the 13 May incident in 1969, Lee was appointed Deputy Minister with Special Functions in the Cabinet by the National Operations Council. When parliamentary democracy was restored in 1971, he was appointed Assistant Labour Minister in the new cabinet. He became the Deputy President of MCA in 1972. He was made Minister with Special Functions in 1973, then the Minister of Technology, Research, and New Village Coordination the same year.

=== 1974–1981: MCA leadership ===
On 8 April 1974, just before the 1974 general election, he was made Acting President of MCA after Tun Tan Siew Sin resigned on the grounds of ill health. He was then elected President of MCA in August 1975. By this point, the influence of MCA had waned once the expanded coalition Barisan Nasional dominated by UMNO was formed. The cabinet posts allocated to MCA therefore also declined in importance, in contrast to Tan Siew Sin who was the Minister of Finance, the various offices in the Malaysian government held by Lee as President of MCA included the Labour and Manpower Minister, the Works and Public Utilities Minister, and the Transport Minister.

While he was president of MCA, Lee launched five significant initiatives. These were the building of Wisma MCA, the headquarters of the party; the setting up of a building fund for Tunku Abdul Rahman College to expand opportunity for tertiary education for the Chinese population; the founding of Multi-Purpose Holdings Berhad, an investment holding company; the establishment of Malaysian Chinese Cultural Society; and a drive to increase MCA membership. Lee tried shifting the image of the party from one that's dominated by an English-educated elite and wealthy towkay, and continued with the attempt to broaden the appeal of the party and brought in professionals, including some leftists. The membership of MCA doubled from 200,000 to 400,000 during his tenure.

In 1978, Lee did not support the attempt to make Chinese a national language or the establishment of an independent Chinese university, and he also proposed converting Chinese secondary schools into national-type schools, all of which disappointed many in the Chinese community. Education was a contentious issue in the 1978 general election, and MCA saw a small loss of support, winning 17 of the 28 parliamentary seats contested, which was down 2 from 1974. However, in a bid to improve Chinese participation in government universities which had declined due to government policy of positive discrimination in favour of Malays, Lee led a delegation to persuade the UMNO leadership to fix the intake of non-Bumiputras in the five government universities at 45 percent in 1979. Also in 1979, in a period of internal political struggle, he fought off a challenge from Michael Chen for the presidency of MCA and was re-elected.

=== 1982–1983: Electoral success and resignation ===
In the 1982 general election, in response to a taunt by the opposition Democratic Action Party (DAP) that the MCA's leadership did not dare contest seats with a large urban Chinese majority, Lee accepted the challenge and contested the parliamentary seat for Seremban against the DAP chairman Chen Man Hin who had held that seat since 1969. Lee won the contest by a small majority, and also led his party to a landslide victory, winning 24 out of 28 allocated parliamentary seats and 55 out of 62 state seats. Later, Lee continued to serve as Minister of Transport under Prime Minister Mahathir Mohamad.

However, on 24 March 1983, at the height of his career, Lee unexpectedly resigned his cabinet post of Minister of Transport for unspecified reasons and relinquished his position as President of MCA a day later. He never gave an explanation for his resignation, apart from stating in an interview with the Chinese edition of Asiaweek in 2000 that he was "stabbed in the back" by UMNO leaders in the 1982 election.

== Business career ==
After he retired from politics, Lee was appointed chair/chief executive officer of Multi-Purpose Holdings Bhd, Chair of Malaysian French Bank Bhd, and Chair of Industrial Oxygen Incorporated Bhd. He was also Chairman of Lee & Mok Sdn Bhd, Sunrise Bhd, Magerk Sdn Bhd, and Worldspan Travel (M) Sdn Bhd.

== Personal life ==
Lee married Dianne Mok Thye Yuen (Chinese: 莫泰媛) in 1962. They have two children, son Kwan Por (Chinese: 李官博) and daughter Ann Gee (Chinese: 李安琪).

He received an Honorary Doctorate of Law from Campbell University, North Carolina, United States.

== Death ==
Lee died on 3 March 2023 at age 87.

== Election results ==
Parliament of Malaysia
Year	Constituency	Candidate	Votes	Pct	Opponent(s)	Votes	Pct	Ballots cast	Majority	Turnout
1959	P095 Kluang Utara	Lee San Choon (MCA)	5,985	56.92%	Wee Lee Fong (LPM)	4,530	43.08%	10,594	1,455	77.99%
1964	P090 Segamat Selatan	Lee San Choon (MCA)	11,355	63.33%	Chiu Siu Meng (LPM)	4,956	27.64%	18,693	6,399	82.43%
1964	P090 Segamat Selatan	Lee San Choon (MCA)	11,355	63.33%	Tan Luan Hong (UDP)	1,619	9.03%	18,693	6,399	82.43%
1969	P090 Segamat Selatan	Lee San Choon (MCA)	14,470	73.63%	Abdul Rahman Abdul Rasool (IND)	5,183	26.37%	21,305	9,287	71.66%
1974	P100 Segamat	Lee San Choon (MCA)	17,369	74.42%	Lee Ah Meng (DAP)	5,971	25.58%	24,298	11,398	81.28%
1978	P100 Segamat	Lee San Choon (MCA)	22,098	82.22%	Abdul Hak Fadzil (PAS)	4,780	17.78%	28,823	17,318	81.21%
1982	P091 Seremban	Lee San Choon (MCA)	23,258	50.93%	Chen Man Hin (DAP)	22,413	49.07%	46,903	845	77.22%

== Honours ==
- Malaya
  - Officer of the Order of the Defender of the Realm (KMN) (1963)
- Malaysia
  - Recipient of the Malaysian Commemorative Medal (Silver) (PPM) (1965)
  - Commander of the Order of the Defender of the Realm (PMN) – Tan Sri (1990)
- Johor
  - Knight Grand Commander of the Order of the Crown of Johor (SPMJ) – Dato' (1973)
  - Knight Grand Companion of the Order of Loyalty of Sultan Ismail of Johor (SSIJ) – Dato' (1977)

=== Places named after him ===
- Dewan San Choon Wisma MCA, a Hall for the Annual General Meeting of Malaysian Chinese Association

== See also ==
Political offices
Preceded by Tan Siew Sin	Malaysian Chinese Association (MCA) President; August 1975 – 25 March 1983	Succeeded by Tan Koon Swan
