= Mary Josephine Pritam Singh =

Malaysian politician

Yang Berbahagia Dato' Mary Josephine Pritam Singh DBNS

Member of the Negeri Sembilan State Legislative Assembly for Rahang
- In office 5 May 2013 – 12 August 2023
- Preceded by: M.K. Arumugam (PR–DAP)
- Succeeded by: Siau Meow Kong (PH–DAP)
- Majority: 1,964 (2013); 6,560 (2018)

Personal details
- Born: Mary Josephine Pritam Singh; 1949 (age 76–77)
- Party: Democratic Action Party (DAP) (since 1974)
- Other political affiliations: Pakatan Rakyat (PR) (2008–2015); Pakatan Harapan (PH) (since 2015)
- Occupation: Politician

Dato' Mary Josephine Pritam Singh (born 1949) is a Malaysian politician who served as Member of the Negeri Sembilan State Legislative Assembly (MLA) for Rahang from May 2013 to August 2023. She is a member of the Democratic Action Party (DAP), a component party of the Pakatan Harapan (PH) and formerly Pakatan Rakyat (PR) coalitions.

In July 2020, she was briefly an independent after she decided to leave DAP due to some challenges she faced and before she withdrew the decision and rejoined the party 10 days later.

== Election results ==
Negeri Sembilan State Legislative Assembly
Year	Constituency	Candidate	Votes	Pct	Opponent(s)	Votes	Pct	Ballots cast	Majority	Turnout
2013	N22 Rahang	Mary Josephine Pritam Singh (DAP)	7,166	57.94%	Julia Wong Pik Min (MCA)	5,202	42.06%	12,600	1,964	83.20%
2018	N22 Rahang	Mary Josephine Pritam Singh (DAP)	10,018	73.98%	Yap Sui Moi (MCA)	3,458	25.54%	13,821	6,560	80.90%
2018	N22 Rahang	Mary Josephine Pritam Singh (DAP)	10,018	73.98%	Saraswathy Paragazum (PAP)	66	0.49%	13,821	6,560	80.90%

== Honours ==
- Negeri Sembilan
  - Knight of the Order of Loyal Service to Negeri Sembilan (DBNS) – Dato' (2024)
