= Seremban Timor (federal constituency) =

Negeri Sembilan constituency

Defunct federal constituency
- Legislature: Dewan Rakyat
- Constituency created: 1958
- Constituency abolished: 1974
- First contested: 1959
- Last contested: 1969

Seremban Timor was a federal constituency in Negeri Sembilan, Malaysia, that was represented in the Dewan Rakyat from 1959 to 1974.

The federal constituency was created in the 1974 redistribution and was mandated to return a single member to the Dewan Rakyat under the first past the post voting system.

== History ==
It was abolished in 1974 when it was redistributed.

=== Representation history ===
Members of Parliament for Seremban Timor
Parliament	No	Years	Member	Party	Vote Share
Constituency created from Seremban
Parliament of the Federation of Malaya
1st	P080	1959-1963	Chin See Yin (陈世英)	Independent	5,762; 40.59%
Parliament of Malaysia
1st	P080	1963-1964	Chin See Yin (陈世英)	Independent	5,762; 40.59%
2nd	P080	1964-1969	Quek Kai Dong (郭开东)	Alliance (MCA)	9,604; 44.04%
		1969-1971	Parliament was suspended		
3rd	P080	1971-1974	Chen Man Hin (曾敏兴)	DAP	13,475; 60.32%
Constituency abolished, split into Seremban and Mantin

=== State constituency ===
Parliamentary constituency	State constituency						
Parliamentary constituency	1955–59*	1959–1974	1974–1986	1986–1995	1995–2004	2004–2018	2018–present
Seremban Timor		Rahang					
Seremban Timor		Rantau					
Seremban Timor		Sungei Ujong					

=== Historical boundaries ===
State Constituency	Area
State Constituency	1959
Rahang	Kampung Pasir; Rahang; Taman Bukit Ampangan; Taman Dusun Nyior; Taman Purba
Rantau	Kampung Kanchong; Kampung Silau; Nusari Bayu; Rantau; Sungai Gadut
Sungei Ujong	Ampangan; Kampung Orang Asli Ngoi Ngoi; Pantai; Senawang; Sikamat

== Election results ==
Malaysian general election, 1969
Party	Candidate	Votes	%	∆%
DAP	Chen Man Hin	13,475	60.32	▲60.32
Alliance	Wong Seng Chow	8,073	36.14	▼7.90
United Malaysia Chinese Organization	Chin See Yin	791	3.54	▲3.54
Total valid votes		22,339	100.00	
Total rejected ballots		905		
Unreturned ballots		0		
Turnout		23,244	72.14	▼5.26
Registered electors		32,222		
Majority		5,402	24.18	▲4.95
DAP gain from Alliance		Swing		?

Malaysian general election, 1964
Party	Candidate	Votes	%	∆%
Alliance	Quek Kai Dong	9,604	44.04	▲29.52
PAP	Lau Kit Sun	5,410	24.81	▲24.81
Socialist Front	Lim Kee Sai	5,124	23.50	▼4.57
UDP	Francis Wong Lun King	1,670	7.66	▲7.66
Total valid votes		21,808	100.00	
Total rejected ballots		642		
Unreturned ballots		0		
Turnout		22,450	77.40	▲0.85
Registered electors		29,004		
Majority		4,194	19.23	▲6.71
Alliance gain from Independent		Swing		?

Malayan general election, 1959
Party	Candidate	Votes	%
Independent	Chin See Yin	5,762	40.59
Socialist Front	Robert Singam	3,985	28.07
PMIP	Md Nor Abdul Hamid	2,387	16.82
Alliance	Tham Tat Ming	2,061	14.52
Total valid votes		14,195	100.00
Total rejected ballots		103	
Unreturned ballots		0	
Turnout		14,298	76.55
Registered electors		18,678	
Majority		1,777	12.52
This was a new constituency created.
