= Choo Ken Hwa =

Malaysian politician

Yang Berhormat Tuan Choo Ken Hwa MLA
- 朱建华
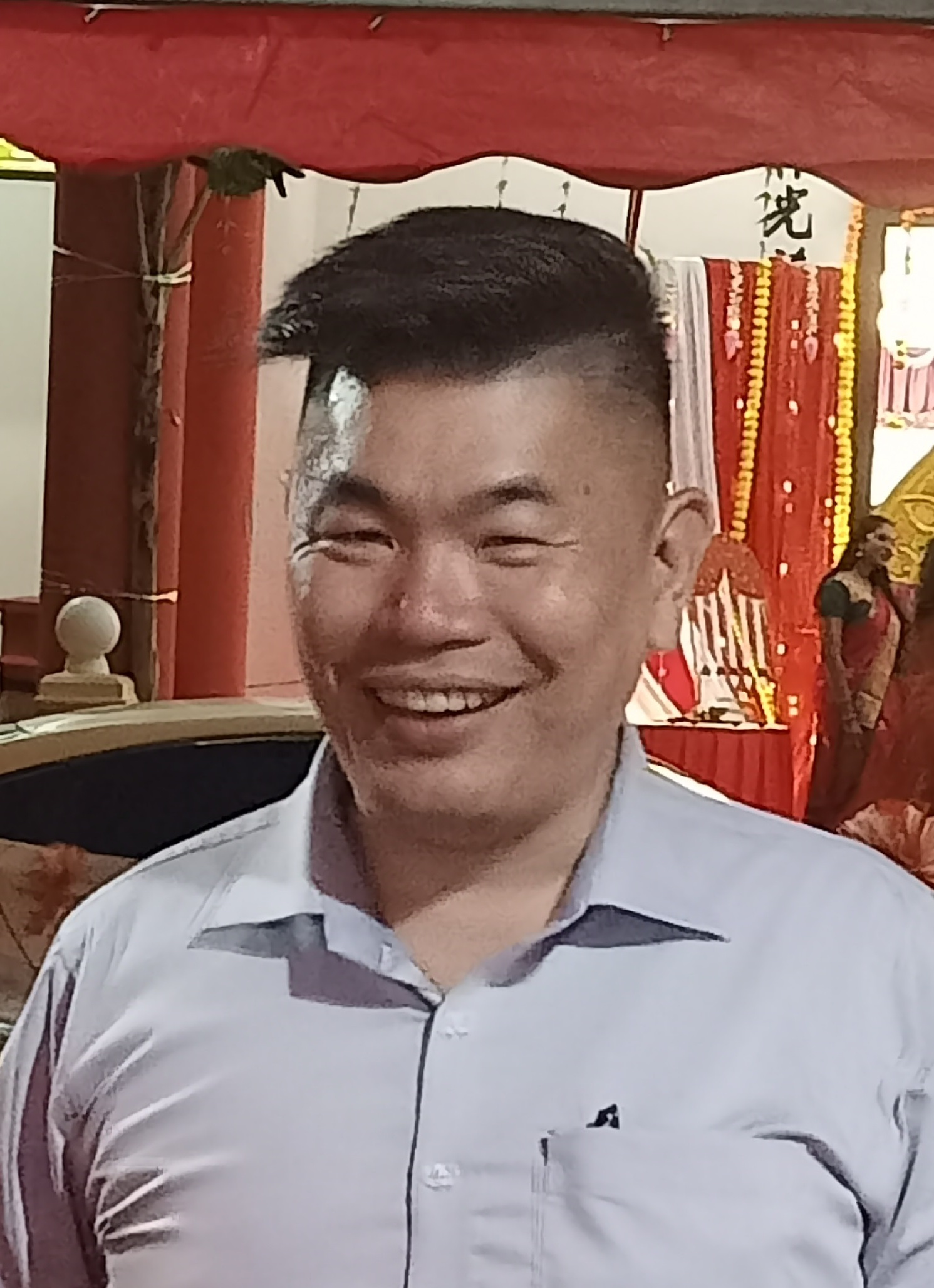
- Choo Ken Hwa in 2026

Member of the Negeri Sembilan State Executive Council (Unity, Information and National Integration)
- In office 23 May 2018 – 14 August 2023
- Monarch: Muhriz
- Menteri Besar: Aminuddin Harun
- Preceded by: Ismail Lasim (Unity and National Integration); Mohamad Hasan (Menteri Besar, Information)
- Succeeded by: Tengku Zamrah Tengku Sulaiman
- Constituency: Lukut

Member of the Negeri Sembilan State Legislative Assembly for Lukut
- Incumbent
- Assumed office 9 May 2018
- Preceded by: Ean Yong Tin Sin (PR–DAP)
- Majority: 8,405 (2018); 10,135 (2023)

Personal details
- Born: Choo Ken Hwa; 28 March 1977 (age 49) Negeri Sembilan, Malaysia
- Party: Democratic Action Party (DAP)
- Other political affiliations: Pakatan Harapan (PH)
- Occupation: Politician

Choo Ken Hwa

Chinese name
- Traditional Chinese: 朱建華
- Simplified Chinese: 朱建华
Transcriptions
Standard Mandarin
- Hanyu Pinyin: Zhū Jiànhuá
Yue: Cantonese
- Jyutping: Zyu1 Gin3 Waa6
Southern Min
- Hokkien POJ: Chu Kiàn-hôa

Choo Ken Hwa (simplified Chinese: 朱建华; traditional Chinese: 朱建華; pinyin: Zhū Jiànhuá; Jyutping: Zyu1 Gin3 Waa6; Pe̍h-ōe-jī: Chu Kiàn-hôa; born 28 March 1977) is a Malaysian politician who has served as Member of the Negeri Sembilan State Legislative Assembly (MLA) for Lukut since May 2018. He served as Member of the Negeri Sembilan State Executive Council (EXCO) in the Pakatan Harapan (PH) state administration under Menteri Besar Aminuddin Harun from May 2018 to August 2023. He is a member of the Democratic Action Party (DAP), a component party of the PH coalition.

== Election results ==
Negeri Sembilan State Legislative Assembly
Year	Constituency	Candidate	Votes	Pct	Opponent(s)	Votes	Pct	Ballots cast	Majority	Turnout%
2018	N30 Lukut	Choo Ken Hwa (DAP)	11,449	79.00%	Yeong Kun You (MCA)	3,044	21.00%	14,689	8,405	84.80%
2023	N30 Lukut	Choo Ken Hwa (DAP)	13,696	79.36%	Ragoo Subramaniam (PAS)	3,561	20.64%	17,402	10,135	64.92%
