= Lukut (state constituency) =

Malaysian electoral district

Lukut (N30)
Negeri Sembilan constituency

State constituency
- Legislature: Negeri Sembilan State Legislative Assembly
MLA
Choo Ken Hwa
PH
- Constituency created: 1959
- Constituency abolished: 1974
- Constituency re-created: 1995
- First contested: 1959
- Last contested: 2026

Demographics
- Electors (2023): 26,806

N30 Lukut within Negeri Sembilan, as used for the 2023 and 2026 state elections

Lukut is a state constituency in Negeri Sembilan, Malaysia, that has been represented in the Negeri Sembilan State Legislative Assembly.

The state constituency was first contested in 1959 and is mandated to return a single Assemblyman to the Negeri Sembilan State Legislative Assembly under the first-past-the-post voting system.

== Demographics ==
Ethnic breakdown of Lukut's electorate as of 2026
1. Chinese (47.9%)
2. Indian (26.0%)
3. Malay (24.4%)
4. Other ethnicities (1.50%)

== History ==
=== Polling districts ===
According to the gazette issued on 23 July 2026, the Lukut constituency has a total of 7 polling districts.

State constituency	Polling districts	Code	Location
Lukut (N30）	Kampung Jimah Baru	132/30/01	SK Jimah Baru
Lukut (N30）	Bandar Spring Hill	132/30/02	SA Rakyat An Nur Bandar Spring Hill; SJK (T) Bandar Springhill
Lukut (N30）	Taman Indah Jaya	132/30/03	SK Lukut
Lukut (N30）	Kuala Lukut	132/30/04	SMK Raja Jumaat
Lukut (N30）	Lukut	132/30/05	SJK (T) Ladang Sungai Salak
Lukut (N30）	Sri Parit	132/30/06	SJK (C) Chung Hua Lukut
Lukut (N30）	Tanjong Gemok	132/30/07	SJK (C) Bradwall

=== Representation history ===
Members of the Legislative Assembly for Lukut
Assembly	No	Years	Member	Party
Constituency created
1st	N13	1959-1964	Chin See Yin (陈世英)	Alliance (MCA)
2nd	N13	1964-1969	Lee Tee Siong (李致祥)	Alliance (MCA)
		1969-1971	Assembly was dissolved	
3rd	N13	1971-1974	Chin Chan Sung (陈竞生)	DAP
Constituency split into Jimah and Si Rusa
Constituency recreated from Jimah
9th	N32	1995-1999	Yeow Chai Thiam (姚再添)	BN (MCA)
10th	N32	1999-2004	Yeow Chai Thiam (姚再添)	BN (MCA)
11th	N30	2004-2008	Yeow Chai Thiam (姚再添)	BN (MCA)
12th	N30	2008-2013	Ean Yong Tin Sin (欧阳丁清)	PR (DAP)
13th	N30	2013-2015	Ean Yong Tin Sin (欧阳丁清)	PR (DAP)
13th	N30	2015-2018	Ean Yong Tin Sin (欧阳丁清)	PH (DAP)
14th	N30	2018–2023	Choo Ken Hwa (朱建华)	PH (DAP)
15th	N30	2023–2026	Choo Ken Hwa (朱建华)	PH (DAP)
16th	N30	2026–present	Choo Ken Hwa (朱建华)	PH (DAP)

== Election results ==
Negeri Sembilan state election, 2026
Party	Candidate	Votes	%	∆%
PH	Choo Ken Hwa	11,905	63.80	▼14.83
PN	Sathes Kumar Nilameham	6,188	33.16	▲12.72
Independent	Teo Seng Lee	568	3.04	▲3.04
Total valid votes		18,661	100.00	
Total rejected ballots		227		
Unreturned ballots		17		
Turnout		18,905	66.99	▲5.55
Registered electors		28,219		
Majority		5,717	30.64	▼27.55
PH hold		Swing		

Negeri Sembilan state election, 2023
Party	Candidate	Votes	%	∆%
PH	Choo Ken Hwa	13,696	78.63	▲78.63
PN	Ragoo Subramaniam	3,561	20.44	▲20.44
Total valid votes		17,257	100.00	
Total rejected ballots		155		
Unreturned ballots		16		
Turnout		17,418	64.98	▼19.94
Registered electors		26,806		
Majority		10,135	58.19	▲0.19
PH hold		Swing		

Negeri Sembilan state election, 2018
Party	Candidate	Votes	%	∆%
PKR	Choo Ken Hwa	11,449	79.00	▲79.00
BN	Yeong Kun You	3,044	21.00	▼11.70
Total valid votes		14,493	100.00	
Total rejected ballots		167		
Unreturned ballots		29		
Turnout		14,689	84.92	▼1.61
Registered electors		17,298		
Majority		8,405	58.00	▲23.40
PKR hold		Swing		

Negeri Sembilan state election, 2013
Party	Candidate	Votes	%	∆%
DAP	Ean Yong Tin Sin	7,692	67.30	▲3.47
BN	Yeong Seng Wong	3,738	32.70	▼3.47
Total valid votes		11,430	100.00	
Total rejected ballots		190		
Unreturned ballots		30		
Turnout		11,650	86.53	▲7.40
Registered electors		13,463		
Majority		3,954	34.60	▲6.94
DAP hold		Swing		
Source(s) "Federal Government Gazette - Notice of Contested Election, State Legislative Assembly for the State of Negeri Sembilan [P.U. (B) 193/2013]" (PDF). Attorney General's Chambers of Malaysia. 26 April 2013. "Federal Government Gazette - Results of Contested Election and Statements of the Poll after the Official Addition of Votes, State Constituencies for the State of Negeri Sembilan [P.U. (B) 234/2013]" (PDF). Attorney General's Chambers of Malaysia. 22 May 2013.

Negeri Sembilan state election, 2008
Party	Candidate	Votes	%	∆%
DAP	Ean Yong Tin Sin	5,579	63.83	▲23.94
BN	Cheok Leong Huat	3,161	36.17	▼23.94
Total valid votes		8,740	100.00	
Total rejected ballots		180		
Unreturned ballots		3		
Turnout		8,923	79.13	▲3.71
Registered electors		11,276		
Majority		2,418	27.66	▲7.44
DAP gain from BN		Swing		?

Negeri Sembilan state election, 2004
Party	Candidate	Votes	%	∆%
BN	Yeow Chai Thiam	4,471	60.11	▼1.02
DAP	Wong Hong Chuan	2,967	39.89	▲1.02
Total valid votes		7,438	100.00	
Total rejected ballots		201		
Unreturned ballots		3		
Turnout		7,642	75.45	▲2.93
Registered electors		10,128		
Majority		1,504	20.22	▼2.04
BN hold		Swing		

Negeri Sembilan state election, 1999
Party	Candidate	Votes	%	∆%
BN	Yeow Chai Thiam	8,055	61.13	▼6.42
DAP	Lim Fui Ming	5,122	38.87	▲6.42
Total valid votes		13,177	100.00	
Total rejected ballots		381		
Unreturned ballots		10		
Turnout		13,568	72.53	▼2.27
Registered electors		18,708		
Majority		2,933	22.26	▼12.83
BN hold		Swing		

Negeri Sembilan state election, 1995
Party	Candidate	Votes	%	∆%
BN	Yeow Chai Thiam	8,926	67.54	
DAP	Chen Hun Chong	4,289	32.46	
Total valid votes		13,215	100.00	
Total rejected ballots		417		
Unreturned ballots		0		
Turnout		13,632	74.79	
Registered electors		18,227		
Majority		4,637	35.09	
BN gain from DAP		Swing		-

Negeri Sembilan state election, 1969
Party	Candidate	Votes	%	∆%
DAP	Chin Chan Sung	1,340	56.33	▲56.33
Alliance	Lee Tee Siong	892	37.49	▼31.60
Independent	Rajaratnam a/l Chellapah	110	4.62	▼5.32
PCMB	Lee Ke Kiong	37	1.56	▲1.56
Total valid votes		2,379	100.00	
Total rejected ballots		108		
Unreturned ballots		0		
Turnout		2,487	69.94	▼6.74
Registered electors		3,556		
Majority		448	18.83	▼33.89
DAP gain from Alliance		Swing		-

Negeri Sembilan state election, 1964
Party	Candidate	Votes	%	∆%
Alliance	Lee Tee Siong	1,321	69.09	▲12.12
Independent	Nadchatiram Saraswathy Devi	313	16.37	▲16.37
Independent	Yong On	190	9.94	▲9.94
UDP	K. Thangaraju	88	4.60	▲4.60
Total valid votes		1,912	100.00	
Total rejected ballots		120		
Unreturned ballots		0		
Turnout		2,032	76.68	▼10.67
Registered electors		2,650		
Majority		1,008	52.72	▲38.78
Alliance hold		Swing		

Negeri Sembilan state election, 1959
Party	Candidate	Votes	%
Alliance	Chin See Yin	760	56.97
Socialist Front	G. K. Kathiravalu	574	43.03
Total valid votes		1,334	100.00
Total rejected ballots		40	
Unreturned ballots		0	
Turnout		1,374	87.35
Registered electors		1,573	
Majority		186	13.94
This was a new constituency created.
