= John Fernandez (Malaysian politician) =

Malaysian politician (1941–2023)

- ஜான் பெர்னாண்டஸ்

Member of the Malaysian Parliament for Seremban
- In office 8 March 2008 – 5 May 2013
- Preceded by: Hon Choon Kim (BN–MCA)
- Succeeded by: Anthony Loke Siew Fook (PR–DAP)
- Majority: 3,948 (2008)

Personal details
- Born: 9 December 1941 Selangor, Federated Malay States (now Malaysia)
- Died: 26 December 2023 (aged 82) Negeri Sembilan, Malaysia
- Party: Democratic Action Party (DAP) (–2013); Independent (2013–2023)
- Other political affiliations: Pakatan Rakyat (PR) (2008–2013)
- Occupation: Politician

John Fernandez (Tamil: ஜான் பெர்னாண்டஸ்; 9 December 1941 – 26 December 2023) was a Malaysian politician who served as the Member of Parliament (MP) for Seremban from March 2008 to May 2013. He was an independent and a member of the Democratic Action Party (DAP), a component party of formerly the Pakatan Rakyat (PR) coalition.

Fernandez was a lawyer who was first called to the Bar in 1975. He first ran for the state seat of Jimah in 1986 under the Malaysian Workers Party, before being elected to Parliament in the 2008 general election, winning the seat of Seremban for DAP from the governing Barisan Nasional (BN) coalition.

He left DAP to protest the lack of Indian candidates nominated to contest in the 2013 general election. He nominated himself as an independent candidate to defend the Seremban seat. He was defeated by Anthony Loke Siew Fook of his former party DAP and coalition PR by a minority of 45,407 votes after garnering only 221 votes and lost his election deposit after failing to garner 12.5% of the total votes cast.

== Death ==
Fernandez died on 26 December 2023, at the age of 82.

== Election results ==
Negeri Sembilan State Legislative Assembly
Year	Constituency	Candidate	Votes	Pct	Opponent(s)	Votes	Pct	Ballots cast	Majority	Turnout
1986	N23 Jimah	John Fernandez (PPPM)	64	0.66%	Yeow Chai Thiam (MCA)	4,571	46.82%	9,762	224	78.33%
1986	N23 Jimah	John Fernandez (PPPM)	64	0.66%	M Kuppusamy (DAP)	4,795	49.12%	9,762	224	78.33%
2004	N33 Port Dickson	John Fernandez (DAP)	3,061	36.63%	Rajagopalu Thamotharapillay (MIC)	4,954	59.29%	8,356	1,893	68.44%

Parliament of Malaysia
Year	Constituency	Candidate	Votes	Pct	Opponent(s)	Votes	Pct	Ballots cast	Majority	Turnout
2008	P128 Seremban	John Fernandez (DAP)	32,970	53.18%	Yu Chok Tow (MCA)	29,022	46.82%	64,437	3,948	76.10%
2013	P128 Seremban	John Fernandez (IND)	221	0.26%	Loke Siew Fook (DAP)	45,628	53.12%	87,617	12,553	85.64%
2013	P128 Seremban	John Fernandez (IND)	221	0.26%	Yeow Chai Thiam (MCA)	33,075	38.52%	87,617	12,553	85.64%
2013	P128 Seremban	John Fernandez (IND)	221	0.26%	Abd Halim Abdullah (Berjasa)	6,866	8.00%	87,617	12,553	85.64%
2013	P128 Seremban	John Fernandez (IND)	221	0.26%	Bujang Abu (IND)	83	0.10%	87,617	12,553	85.64%
