= Seremban (federal constituency) =

Constituency of Negeri Sembilan, Malaysia

Seremban (P128)
Negeri Sembilan constituency

Federal constituency
- Legislature: Dewan Rakyat
- MP: Loke Siew Fook; PH
- Constituency created: 1955
- Constituency abolished: 1959
- Constituency re-created: 1974
- First contested: 1955
- Last contested: 2022

Demographics
- Population (2020): 272,520
- Electors (2026): 166,256
- Area (km²): 493
- Pop. density (per km²): 552.8

Seremban is a federal constituency in Seremban District, Negeri Sembilan, Malaysia, that has been represented in the Dewan Rakyat since 1955 to 1959 and 1974 to present.

The federal constituency was created in the 1955 redistribution and is mandated to return a single member to the Dewan Rakyat under the first past the post voting system. This seat contains the most state constituencies in Malaysia, with six state constituencies.

== Demographics ==
Ethnic breakdown of Seremban's electorate as of 2022
1. Malay (51.6%)
2. Chinese (31.7%)
3. Indian (13.8%)
4. Other ethnicities (2.90%)

As of 2020, Seremban has a population of 272,520 people.

Age breakdown of Seremban's electorate as of 2022
1. 18-20 (6.67%)
2. 21-29 (21.1%)
3. 30-39 (20.7%)
4. 40-49 (16.8%)
5. 50-59 (14.6%)
6. 60-69 (11.9%)
7. 70-79 (5.76%)
8. 80-89 (2.01%)
9. above 90 (0.45%)
Gender breakdown of Seremban's electorate as of 2022
1. Male (49.6%)
2. Female (50.4%)

== History ==
=== Polling districts ===
According to the federal gazette issued on 23 July 2026, the Seremban constituency is divided into 41 polling districts.

State constituency	Polling district	Code	Location
Lenggeng (N09)	Pekan Broga	128/09/01	SJK (C) Kg Baru Broga
Lenggeng (N09)	Ulu Beranang	128/09/02	SK Ulu Beranang
Lenggeng (N09)	Kampong Daching	128/09/03	SK Kampong Daching
Lenggeng (N09)	Kampong Rawa Ulu	128/09/04	SK Mendum
Lenggeng (N09)	Lenggeng	128/09/05	SK Dato' Klana Putra
Lenggeng (N09)	Machang	128/09/06	SK Sungai Jai
Lenggeng (N09)	Desa Sri Pantai	128/09/07	SK Pantai
Lenggeng (N09)	Pantai	128/09/08	Gitamara Seremban
Lenggeng (N09)	Panchor	128/09/09	SK Panchor; SMK Panchor; SJK (C) Kampung Baru Paroi
Nilai (N10)	Nilai	128/10/01	SMK Dato' Mohd Said; SJK (C) Kuo Min Nilai
Nilai (N10)	Batang Benar	128/10/02	SK Batang Benar
Nilai (N10)	Pekan Pajam	128/10/03	SJK (C) Kg Baru Pajam
Nilai (N10)	Kampung Gebok	128/10/04	Balai Raya Kampung Gebok Pajam; Tabika Kemas Kampung Gebok
Nilai (N10)	Batu Sebelas	128/10/05	SK Mantin
Nilai (N10)	Kampong Bahru Mantin	128/10/06	Dewan Orang Ramai Kampung Baru Mantin
Nilai (N10)	Pekan Mantin	128/10/07	SMK Mantin; SJK (C) Chung Hua Mantin
Nilai (N10)	Kg Attap	128/10/08	SJK (C) Chi Chi Mantin; Dewan Komuniti Mantin
Nilai (N10)	Mantin Dalam	128/10/09	SJK (T) Ladang Cairo
Nilai (N10)	Bandar Baru Nilai	128/10/10	SMK Taman Semarak; SK Taman Semarak; SJK (C) Putra Nilai; SK Desa Jasmin; SK Nilai Impian
Lobak (N11)	Kg Lobak	128/11/01	SJK (C) Pei Hua
Lobak (N11)	Ulu Temiang	128/11/02	SJK (C) Chi Hwa
Lobak (N11)	Jalan Manickavasagam	128/11/03	SJK (T) Lobak
Lobak (N11)	Lobak	128/11/04	SJK (C) Chung Hua Seremban
Lobak (N11)	Taman Templer	128/11/05	SJK (C) Chan Wa
Lobak (N11)	Kampong Nee Yan	128/11/06	SJK (C) Kuo Min
Temiang (N12)	Taman Temiang Jaya	128/12/01	SMA Sheikh Haji Mohd Said
Temiang (N12)	Temiang	128/12/02	SMJK Chan Wa
Temiang (N12)	Limbok	128/12/03	SK Temiang
Temiang (N12)	Jalan Yazid Ahmad	128/12/04	Sekolah Sri Seremban
Temiang (N12)	Jalan Han Hui Foong	128/12/05	SK Dato Klana Maamor
Sikamat (N13)	Taman Paroi Jaya	128/13/01	SK Taman Paroi Jaya; Kompleks Sukan Negeri Paroi
Sikamat (N13)	Sikamat	128/13/02	Dewan Orang Ramai Taman Perwira; SJK (C) Kampung Seri Sikamat; SMK Warisan Puteri
Sikamat (N13)	Taman Jujur	128/13/03	Dewan Terbuka Desa Kiara; SK Sikamat
Sikamat (N13)	Jalan Sikamat	128/13/04	SMK Dato Sheikh Ahmad
Sikamat (N13)	Taman Desa Rhu	128/13/05	Institut Perguruan Raja Melewar Sikamat; Dewan Orang Ramai Sikamat; SMK Dato' Haji Mohd Redza
Ampangan (N14)	Medan Rahang	128/14/01	Kolej Mara Seremban
Ampangan (N14)	Ampangan	128/14/02	SK K.G.V Seremban
Ampangan (N14)	Kampong Gedong Lalang	128/14/03	Kolej Vokesional Ampangan
Ampangan (N14)	Taman Dato Shahbandar	128/14/04	SK Ampangan; SK Seri Kelana; Dewan Besar Gedong Lalang 50
Ampangan (N14)	Dusun Nyior	128/14/05	SK Taman Dusun Nyior
Ampangan (N14)	Kampong Jiboi	128/14/06	SMA Makmor Ampangan Seremban; SA Rakyat Kampung Baru Blok C Ampangan

=== Representation history ===
Members of Parliament for Seremban
Parliament	No	Years	Member	Party	Vote Share
Federal Legislative Council
1st		1955–1959	Lim Kee Siong (林纪祥)	Alliance (MCA)	8,402; 78.46%
Constituency abolished, split into Seremban Barat and Seremban Timor
Parliament of Malaysia
Constituency created from Seremban Timor, Seremban Barat and Rembau-Tampin
4th	P091	1974–1978	Chen Man Hin (曾敏兴)	DAP	16,280; 55.71%
5th	P091	1978–1982	Chen Man Hin (曾敏兴)	DAP	23,057; 60.61%
6th	P091	1982–1983	Lee San Choon (李三春)	BN (MCA)	23,258; 50.93%
6th	P091	1983–1986	Chen Man Hin (曾敏兴)	DAP	23,897; 57.72%
7th	P107	1986–1990	Chen Man Hin (曾敏兴)	DAP	23,577; 51.15%
8th	P107	1990–1995	Yim Chee Chong (严慈忠)	BN (MCA)	26,874; 50.07%
9th	P117	1995–1999	Hon Choon Kim (韩春锦)	BN (MCA)	33,452; 64.07%
10th	P117	1999–2004	Hon Choon Kim (韩春锦)	BN (MCA)	33,155; 58.09%
11th	P128	2004–2008	Hon Choon Kim (韩春锦)	BN (MCA)	36,542; 64.28%
12th	P128	2008–2013	John Fernandez (ஜொஹ்ன் பெர்னாண்டஸ்)	PR (DAP)	32,970; 53.18%
13th	P128	2013–2015	Anthony Loke Siew Fook (陆兆福)	PR (DAP)	45,628; 53.12%
13th	P128	2015–2018	Anthony Loke Siew Fook (陆兆福)	PH (DAP)	45,628; 53.12%
14th	P128	2018–2022	Anthony Loke Siew Fook (陆兆福)	PH (DAP)	55,503; 60.45%
15th	P128	2022–present	Anthony Loke Siew Fook (陆兆福)	PH (DAP)	63,920; 51.85%

=== State constituency ===
Parliamentary constituency	State constituency						
Parliamentary constituency	1955–59*	1959–1974	1974–1986	1986–1995	1995–2004	2004–2018	2018–present
Seremban				Ampangan			
Seremban	Labu						
Seremban	Lenggeng			Lenggeng			
Seremban					Lobak		
Seremban					Nilai		
Seremban			Rahang				
Seremban	Rantau						
Seremban			Rasah				
Seremban					Senawang		
Seremban	Seremban						
Seremban						Sikamat	
Seremban				Sungai Ujong			
Seremban			Sungei Ujong				
Seremban						Temiang	
Seremban			Terentang				

=== Historical boundaries ===
State Constituency	Area				
State Constituency	1974	1984	1994	2003	2018
Ampangan		Ampangan; Bukit Desa; Gedong Lalang; Sikamat; Temiang	Ampangan; Gedong Lalang; Sikamat; Taman Sri Penaga; Taman Wawasan Putri	Ampangan; Forest Heights; Gedong Lalang; Taman Bukti Setia; Taman Guru Melayu	Ampangan; Dusun Nyior; Gedong Lalang; Taman Dato Shahbandar; Taman Dusun Setia
Lenggeng		Batang Benar; Lenggeng; Mantin; Nilai; Pajam	Kampung Orang Asli Ngoi Ngoi; Kampung Panchor; Lenggeng; Pantai; Taman Bukit Margosa	Kampung Jerlang; Kampung Panchor; Kampung Orang Asli Ngoi Ngoi; Lenggeng; Pantai	
Lobak			Bukit Rasah; Bukit Tembok; Bukit Temiang; Lobak; Seremban	Bukit Desa; Kampung Orang Asli Belihoi; Lobak; Taman Bukit Mutiara; Taman Makmur	
Nilai			Batang Benar; Bukit Puyoh; Mantin; Nilai; Pajam		
Rahang	Bukit Tembok; Bukit Rahang; Lobak; Rahang; Temiang	Bukit Rasah; Bukit Tembok; Bukit Temiang; Lobak; Seremban			
Rasah	Kampung Dato Mansur; Kampung Pasir; Mambau; Rasah; Taman Happy				
Senawang			Forest Heights; Paroi; Senawang; Seremban Jaya; Sungai Gadut		
Sikamat				Kampung Bukit Merbah; Sikamat; Taman Bukit Merbah; Taman Kayu Manis; Taman Sri Penaga	Kampung Bukit Merbah; Sikamat; Taman England; Taman Kayu Manis; Taman Sri Penaga
Sungai Ujong	Forest Heights; Paroi; Senawang; Seremban Jaya; Sungai Gadut				
Temiang				Kampung Bukit Jong; Kampung Bukit Temiang; Seremban; Sri Pula; Temiang	
Terentang	Batu Hampar; Chembong; Pedas; Rembau; Terentang				

=== Current state assembly members ===
No.	State Constituency	Member	Coalition (Party)
N09	Lenggeng	Mohd Asna Amin	BN (UMNO)
N10	Nilai	Arul Kumar Jambunathan	PH (DAP)
N11	Lobak	Chew Seh Yong	PH (DAP)
N12	Temiang	Ho Weng Wah	PH (DAP)
N13	Sikamat	Razali Abu Samah	PN (WAWASAN)
N14	Ampangan	Mohamad Rafie Abdul Malek	PN (PAS)

=== Local governments & postcodes ===
No.	State Constituency	Local Government	Postcode
N09	Lenggeng	Seremban City Council	70000, 70100, 70200, 70400, 70503, 71770 Seremban; 71700, 71750 Mantin; 71800 Nilai
N10	Nilai	Seremban City Council	70000, 70100, 70200, 70400, 70503, 71770 Seremban; 71700, 71750 Mantin; 71800 Nilai
N11	Lobak	Seremban City Council	70000, 70100, 70200, 70400, 70503, 71770 Seremban; 71700, 71750 Mantin; 71800 Nilai
N12	Temiang	Seremban City Council	70000, 70100, 70200, 70400, 70503, 71770 Seremban; 71700, 71750 Mantin; 71800 Nilai
N13	Sikamat	Seremban City Council	70000, 70100, 70200, 70400, 70503, 71770 Seremban; 71700, 71750 Mantin; 71800 Nilai
N14	Ampangan	Seremban City Council	70000, 70100, 70200, 70400, 70503, 71770 Seremban; 71700, 71750 Mantin; 71800 Nilai

== Election results ==
Malaysian general election, 2022
Party	Candidate	Votes	%	∆%
PH	Loke Siew Fook	63,920	51.85	▲51.85
PN	Mohd Fadli Che Me	33,076	26.83	▲26.83
BN	Wong Yin Ting	24,584	19.94	▼7.08
PEJUANG	Mohamad Jani Ismail	1,336	1.08	▲1.08
Independent	Izat Lesly	373	0.30	▲0.30
Total valid votes		123,289	100.00	
Total rejected ballots		1,109		
Unreturned ballots		331		
Turnout		124,729	79.32	▼5.33
Registered electors		157,244		
Majority		30,844	25.02	▼8.41
PH hold		Swing		
Source(s) https://lom.agc.gov.my/ilims/upload/portal/akta/outputp/1753263/PUB615%20PARLIMEN%20NEGERI%20SEMBILAN.pdf

Malaysian general election, 2018
Party	Candidate	Votes	%	∆%
PKR	Loke Siew Fook	55,503	60.45	▲60.45
BN	Chong Sin Woon	24,809	27.02	▼11.50
PAS	Shariffuddin Ahmad	11,506	12.53	▲12.53
Total valid votes		91,818	100.00	
Total rejected ballots		1,052		
Unreturned ballots		384		
Turnout		93,254	84.65	▼0.99
Registered electors		110,168		
Majority		30,694	33.43	▲18.83
PKR hold		Swing		
Source(s) "His Majesty's Government Gazette - Notice of Contested Election, Parliament for the State of Negeri Sembilan [P.U. (B) 242/2018]" (PDF). Attorney General's Chambers of Malaysia. 3 May 2018. "Federal Government Gazette - Results of Contested Election and Statements of the Poll after the Official Addition of Votes, Parliamentary Constituencies for the State of Negeri Sembilan [P.U. (B) 316/2018]" (PDF). Attorney General's Chambers of Malaysia. 28 May 2018.

Malaysian general election, 2013
Party	Candidate	Votes	%	∆%
DAP	Loke Siew Fook	45,628	53.12	▼0.06
BN	Yeow Chai Thiam	33,075	38.52	▼8.30
Pan-Malaysian Islamic Front	Abdul Halim Abdullah	6,866	8.00	▲8.00
Independent	John Fernandez	221	0.26	▲0.26
Independent	Bujang Abu	83	0.10	▲0.10
Total valid votes		85,873	100.00	
Total rejected ballots		1,486		
Unreturned ballots		258		
Turnout		87,617	85.64	▲9.54
Registered electors		102,305		
Majority		12,553	14.60	▲8.24
DAP hold		Swing		
Source(s) "Federal Government Gazette - Notice of Contested Election, Parliament for the State of Negeri Sembilan [P.U. (B) 179/2013]" (PDF). Attorney General's Chambers of Malaysia. 26 April 2013. Archived from the original (PDF) on 2019-12-29. "Federal Government Gazette - Results of Contested Election and Statements of the Poll after the Official Addition of Votes, Parliamentary Constituencies for the State of Negeri Sembilan [P.U. (B) 220/2013]" (PDF). Attorney General's Chambers of Malaysia. 22 May 2013.

Malaysian general election, 2008
Party	Candidate	Votes	%	∆%
DAP	John Fernandez	32,970	53.18	▲17.46
BN	Yu Chok Tow	29,022	46.82	▼17.46
Total valid votes		61,992	100.00	
Total rejected ballots		2,248		
Unreturned ballots		197		
Turnout		64,437	76.10	▲3.68
Registered electors		84,675		
Majority		3,948	6.36	▼22.20
DAP gain from BN		Swing		?

Malaysian general election, 2004
Party	Candidate	Votes	%	∆%
BN	Hon Choon Kim	36,542	64.28	▲6.19
DAP	Choon Yen Loong	20,306	35.72	▼6.19
Total valid votes		56,848	100.00	
Total rejected ballots		2,190		
Unreturned ballots		134		
Turnout		59,172	72.42	▼2.20
Registered electors		81,704		
Majority		16,236	28.56	▲26.95
BN hold		Swing		

Malaysian general election, 1999
Party	Candidate	Votes	%	∆%
BN	Hon Choon Kim	33,155	58.09	▼5.98
DAP	Lee Peng Fee	23,919	41.91	▲12.75
Total valid votes		57,074	100.00	
Total rejected ballots		1,841		
Unreturned ballots		1,093		
Turnout		60,008	74.62	▲0.81
Registered electors		80,413		
Majority		9,236	16.18	▼18.74
BN hold		Swing		

Malaysian general election, 1995
Party	Candidate	Votes	%	∆%
BN	Hon Choon Kim	33,452	64.07	▲14.00
DAP	Lee Yuen Fong	15,217	29.15	▼20.78
PAS	Ishak Mat Aris	3,542	6.78	▲6.78
Total valid votes		52,211	100.00	
Total rejected ballots		1,632		
Unreturned ballots		549		
Turnout		54,392	73.81	▲0.88
Registered electors		73,689		
Majority		18,235	34.92	▲34.78
BN hold		Swing		

Malaysian general election, 1990
Party	Candidate	Votes	%	∆%
BN	Yim Chee Chong	26,874	50.07	▲1.22
DAP	Chen Man Hin	26,797	49.93	▼1.22
Total valid votes		53,671	100.00	
Total rejected ballots		1,452		
Unreturned ballots		0		
Turnout		55,123	72.93	▲1.46
Registered electors		74,579		
Majority		77	0.14	▼2.16
BN gain from DAP		Swing		?

Malaysian general election, 1986
Party	Candidate	Votes	%	∆%
DAP	Chen Man Hin	23,577	51.15	▼6.57
BN	Yim Chee Chong	22,513	48.85	▲6.57
Total valid votes		46,090	100.00	
Total rejected ballots		776		
Unreturned ballots		0		
Turnout		46,866	71.47	
Registered electors		65,571		
Majority		1,064	2.30	▼13.14
DAP hold		Swing		

Malaysian general by-election, 19 November 1983 Upon the resignation of incumbent, Lee San Choon
Party	Candidate	Votes	%	∆%
DAP	Chen Man Hin	23,897	57.72	▲6.79
BN	Rosie Teh	17,504	42.28	▼6.79
Total valid votes		41,401	100.00	
Total rejected ballots				
Unreturned ballots				
Turnout				
Registered electors		60,899		
Majority		6,393	15.44	▲13.58
DAP gain from BN		Swing		?

Malaysian general election, 1982
Party	Candidate	Votes	%	∆%
BN	Lee San Choon	23,258	50.93	▲11.54
DAP	Chen Man Hin	22,413	49.07	▼11.54
Total valid votes		45,671	100.00	
Total rejected ballots		1,232		
Unreturned ballots		0		
Turnout		46,903	77.22	▲0.76
Registered electors		60,739		
Majority		845	1.86	▼19.36
BN gain from DAP		Swing		?

Malaysian general election, 1978
Party	Candidate	Votes	%	∆%
DAP	Chen Man Hin	23,057	60.61	▲4.90
BN	Gan Kong Seng	14,984	39.39	▼4.90
Total valid votes		38,041	100.00	
Total rejected ballots		2,447		
Unreturned ballots		0		
Turnout		40,488	76.46	▲2.13
Registered electors		52,924		
Majority		8,073	21.22	▲9.80
DAP hold		Swing		

Malaysian general election, 1974
Party	Candidate	Votes	%	∆%
DAP	Chen Man Hin	16,280	55.71	
BN	Wong Seng Chow	12,941	44.29	
Total valid votes		29,221	100.00	
Total rejected ballots		1,751		
Unreturned ballots		0		
Turnout		30,972	74.33	
Registered electors		41,671		
Majority		3,339	11.42	
DAP hold		Swing		

Malayan general election, 1955
Party	Candidate	Votes	%
Alliance	Lim Kee Siong	8,402	78.46
National Party	B. H. Tan	2,306	21.53
Total valid votes		10,708	100.00
Total rejected ballots			
Unreturned ballots			
Turnout		10,708	83.60
Registered electors		12,809	
Majority		6,069	56.93
This was a new constituency created.
Source(s): The Straits Times.
