= United Malaysia Chinese Organisation =

- Abbreviation: UMCO
- Leader: Chin See Yin
- President: Chin See Yin
- General Secretary: Chin Choong Thong
- Founded: 1 October 1965
- Legalised: 7 November 1966
- Dissolved: 31 December 1978
- Split from: Malaysian Chinese Association (MCA)
- Headquarters: Kuala Lumpur, Malaysia
- Membership (1969): 200,000
- Ideology: Malaysian Chinese interests
- National affiliation: Barisan Bersatu (1965–1978)
- Colors: White

The United Malaysia Chinese Organisation (Malay: Pertubuhan Cina Malaysia Bersatu, abbreviated as UMCO) was a former political party in Malaysia representing Malaysian Chinese interests. It was established as a splinter group by members of the Malaysian Chinese Association (MCA), one of the three founding component parties of the Alliance Party coalition.

== History ==
UMCO was formed in 1965 and was legalised in November 1966. It was founded by Chin See Yin, a former member of the Malaysian Chinese Association (MCA) and a former independent Member of Parliament (MP) for Seremban Timor.

UMCO contested the 1969 Malaysian general election in Negeri Sembilan but secured only 2 per cent of the vote.

== General election results ==
Election	Total seats won	Seats contested	Total votes	Share of votes	Outcome of election	Election leader
1969	0 / 144	1	1,808	0.08%	; No representation in Parliament	Chin See Yin

== State election results ==
State election	State Legislative Assembly	
State election	Negeri Sembilan	Total won / Total contested
1969	0 / 5	0 / 5

== See also ==
- Local government
- List of political parties in Malaysia
- Politics of Malaysia
