= Rahang (state constituency) =

Political subdivision in Malaysia

Rahang (N22)
Negeri Sembilan constituency

State constituency
- Legislature: Negeri Sembilan State Legislative Assembly
MLA
Siau Meow Kong
PH
- Constituency created: 1959
- First contested: 1959
- Last contested: 2026

Demographics
- Electors (2023): 20,182

N22 Rahang within Negeri Sembilan, as used for the 2023 and 2026 state elections

Rahang is a state constituency in Negeri Sembilan, Malaysia, that has been represented in the Negeri Sembilan State Legislative Assembly.

The state constituency was first contested in 1959 and is mandated to return a single Assemblyman to the Negeri Sembilan State Legislative Assembly under the first-past-the-post voting system.

== Demographics ==
Ethnic breakdown of Rahang's electorate as of 2026
1. Chinese (43.5%)
2. Malay (30.7%)
3. Indian (22.5%)
4. Other ethnicities (3.30%)

== History ==
=== Polling districts ===
According to the federal gazette issued on 23 July 2026, the Rahang constituency is divided into 9 polling districts.

State constituency	Polling district	Code	Location
Rahang (N22)	Rahang	130/22/01	SK Rahang
Rahang (N22)	Rahang Timor	130/22/02	Pejabat RISDA Daerah Rahang
Rahang (N22)	Pekan Rahang	130/22/03	Balai Raya Kg. Semarak
Rahang (N22)	Pekan Rasah	130/22/04	SMK King George V
Rahang (N22)	Kampong Bahru Rasah	130/22/05	SJK (C) Ma Hwa Kg. Baru Rasah
Rahang (N22)	Taman Bukit Chedang	130/22/06	Dewan Badminton, Kompleks Sukan Tan Sri Dato' Dr Hj Mohd Said, Seremban 2
Rahang (N22)	Kampong Pondok	130/22/07	Balai Raya Kg. Baru Rasah
Rahang (N22)	Jalan Tok Ungku	130/22/08	SMK Bukit Mewah
Rahang (N22)	Kampong Datok Mansor	130/22/09	SK Dato' Bandar Rasah

=== Representation history ===
Members of the Legislative Assembly for Rahang
Assembly	No	Years	Name	Party
Constituency created
1st	N07	1959-1964	Han Hiu Fong (韩球丰)	Alliance (MCA)
2nd	N07	1964-1965	Han Hiu Fong (韩球丰)	Alliance (MCA)
2nd	N07	1965-1966	Chen Man Hin (曾敏兴)	IND
2nd	N07	1966-1969	Chen Man Hin (曾敏兴)	DAP
		1969-1971	Assembly was dissolved	
3rd	N07	1971-1974	Chen Man Hin (曾敏兴)	DAP
4th	N10	1974-1978	Chen Man Hin (曾敏兴)	DAP
5th	N10	1978-1982	Chen Man Hin (曾敏兴)	DAP
6th	N10	1982-1986	Hu Sepang (胡雪邦)	DAP
7th	N19	1986-1990	Lee Yuen Fong (李银芳)	DAP
8th	N19	1990-1995	Lee Yuen Fong (李银芳)	DAP
9th	N25	1995-1999	Goh Siow Huat (吴绍阀)	BN (MCA)
10th	N25	1999-2004	Yip Chee Kiong (叶志強)	BN (MCA)
11th	N22	2004-2008	Yip Chee Kiong (叶志強)	BN (MCA)
12th	N22	2008-2013	M.K. Arumugam	PR (DAP)
13th	N22	2013-2018	Mary Josephine Pritam Singh	PR (DAP)
14th	N22	2018-2023	Mary Josephine Pritam Singh	PH (DAP)
15th	N22	2023–2026	Desmond Siau Meow Kong (萧妙光)	PH (DAP)
16th	N22	2026–present	Desmond Siau Meow Kong (萧妙光)	PH (DAP)

== Election results ==
Negeri Sembilan state election, 2026
Party	Candidate	Votes	%	∆%
PH	Siau Meow Kong	7,896	59.03	▼15.14
BN	Yap Siok Moy	4,921	36.79	▲36.79
Socialist Party of Malaysia	Tinagaran Subramaniam	400	2.99	▲2.99
BERSATU	Tang Jay Son	160	1.20	▲1.20
Total valid votes		13,377	100.00	
Total rejected ballots		222		
Unreturned ballots		13		
Turnout		13,612	69.04	▲2.27
Registered electors		19,715		
Majority		2,975	22.24	▼26.10
PH hold		Swing		

Negeri Sembilan state election, 2023
Party	Candidate	Votes	%	∆%
PH	Siau Meow Kong	9,868	74.17	▲74.17
PN	Lee Boon Shian	3,436	25.83	▲25.83
Total valid votes		13,304	100.00	
Total rejected ballots		152		
Unreturned ballots		20		
Turnout		13,476	66.77	▼14.13
Registered electors		20,182		
Majority		6,432	48.34	▼9.12
PH hold		Swing		

Negeri Sembilan state election, 2018
Party	Candidate	Votes	%	∆%
PKR	Mary Josephine Pritam Singh	10,018	73.98	▲73.98
BN	Yap Sui Moi	3,458	25.54	▼16.52
People's Alternative Party	Saraswathy Paragazum	66	0.49	▲0.49
Total valid votes		13,542	100.00	
Total rejected ballots		264		
Unreturned ballots		15		
Turnout		13,821	80.90	▼2.30
Registered electors		17,084		
Majority		6,560	57.46	▲41.58
PKR hold		Swing		

Negeri Sembilan state election, 2013
Party	Candidate	Votes	%	∆%
DAP	Mary Josephine Pritam Singh	7,166	57.94	▲2.82
BN	Julia Wong Pik Min	5,202	42.06	▼2.82
Total valid votes		12,368	100.00	
Total rejected ballots		195		
Unreturned ballots		37		
Turnout		12,600	83.20	▲6.09
Registered electors		15,144		
Majority		1,964	15.88	▲5.64
DAP hold		Swing		

Negeri Sembilan state election, 2008
Party	Candidate	Votes	%	∆%
DAP	Arumugam Karuppan	5,868	55.12	▲14.93
BN	Yip Chee Kiong	4,777	44.88	▼14.93
Total valid votes		10,645	100.00	
Total rejected ballots		290		
Unreturned ballots		62		
Turnout		10,997	77.11	▲7.71
Registered electors		14,262		
Majority		1,091	10.25	▼9.37
DAP gain from BN		Swing		?

Negeri Sembilan state election, 2004
Party	Candidate	Votes	%	∆%
BN	Yip Chee Kiong	5,354	59.81	▲3.50
DAP	Arumugam a/l Karuppan	3,598	40.19	▼3.50
Total valid votes		8,952	100.00	
Total rejected ballots		273		
Unreturned ballots		0		
Turnout		9,225	69.40	▼3.91
Registered electors		13,293		
Majority		1,756	19.62	▲6.99
BN hold		Swing		

Negeri Sembilan state election, 1999
Party	Candidate	Votes	%	∆%
BN	Yip Chee Kiong	6,061	56.31	▼6.41
DAP	Gunasekaren Palasamy	4,702	43.69	▲6.41
Total valid votes		10,763	100.00	
Total rejected ballots		638		
Unreturned ballots		572		
Turnout		11,973	73.31	▼0.07
Registered electors		16,333		
Majority		1,359	12.63	▼12.82
BN hold		Swing		

Negeri Sembilan state election, 1995
Party	Candidate	Votes	%	∆%
BN	Goh Siow Huat	6,515	62.72	▲62.72
DAP	Gunasekaren Palasamy	3,872	37.28	▼37.46
Total valid votes		10,387	100.00	
Total rejected ballots		401		
Unreturned ballots		625		
Turnout		11,413	73.38	▲1.81
Registered electors		15,553		
Majority		2,643	25.45	▼24.03
BN gain from DAP		Swing		-

Negeri Sembilan state election, 1990
Party	Candidate	Votes	%	∆%
DAP	Lee Yuen Fong	11,062	74.74	▲4.41
BN	S. Vijayaratnam	3,739	25.26	▼4.41
Total valid votes		14,801	100.00	
Total rejected ballots		226		
Unreturned ballots		21		
Turnout		15,048	71.57	▼2.12
Registered electors		21,027		
Majority		7,323	49.48	▲8.81
DAP hold		Swing		

Negeri Sembilan state election, 1986
Party	Candidate	Votes	%	∆%
DAP	Lee Yuen Fong	10,588	70.33	▲12.63
BN	Ng Lip Yong	4,466	29.67	▼12.63
Total valid votes		15,054	100.00	
Total rejected ballots		263		
Unreturned ballots		0		
Turnout		15,317	73.69	▼2.83
Registered electors		20,787		
Majority		6,122	40.67	▲25.27
DAP hold		Swing		

Negeri Sembilan state election, 1982
Party	Candidate	Votes	%	∆%
DAP	Hu Sepang	8,217	57.70	▼11.24
BN	Chan Choong Tack	6,024	42.30	▲11.24
Total valid votes		14,241	100.00	
Total rejected ballots		288		
Unreturned ballots		0		
Turnout		14,529	76.52	▲0.20
Registered electors		18,988		
Majority		2,193	15.40	▼22.49
DAP hold		Swing		

Negeri Sembilan state election, 1978
Party	Candidate	Votes	%	∆%
DAP	Dennis Chen Man Hin	8,671	68.94	▲4.71
BN	Cheah Yee Kooi	3,906	31.06	▲31.06
Total valid votes		12,577	100.00	
Total rejected ballots		624		
Unreturned ballots		0		
Turnout		13,201	76.32	▼0.48
Registered electors		17,298		
Majority		4,765	37.89	▲9.44
DAP hold		Swing		

Negeri Sembilan state election, 1974
Party	Candidate	Votes	%	∆%
DAP	Dennis Chen Man Hin	6,210	64.23	▼6.17
BN	Oh Her Sang	3,459	35.77	▲11.02
Total valid votes		9,669	100.00	
Total rejected ballots		615		
Unreturned ballots		0		
Turnout		10,284	76.80	▲2.92
Registered electors		13,391		
Majority		2,751	28.45	▼17.20
DAP hold		Swing		

Negeri Sembilan state election, 1969
Party	Candidate	Votes	%	∆%
DAP	Dennis Chen Man Hin	4,850	70.40	▲70.40
Alliance	Low Loo Toh (Lau Oh Toh)	1,705	24.75	▼5.02
PCMB	Tan Kee Jon	334	4.85	▲4.85
Total valid votes		6,889	100.00	
Total rejected ballots		252		
Unreturned ballots		0		
Turnout		7,141	73.88	▲4.50
Registered electors		9,666		
Majority		3,145	45.65	▲23.18
DAP gain from Independent		Swing		-

Negeri Sembilan state by-election, 11 December 1965 Upon the death of the incumbent, Han Hiu Fong
Party	Candidate	Votes	%	∆%
Independent	Dennis Chen Man Hin	3,576	52.24	▲52.24
Alliance	Kan Kok Kwan	2,038	29.77	▼21.38
Parti Sosialis Rakyat Malaysia	Yim Chee Chong	1,231	17.98	▲17.98
Total valid votes		6,845	100.00	
Total rejected ballots		69		
Unreturned ballots		0		
Turnout		6,914	69.38	▼11.90
Registered electors		9,965		
Majority		1,538	22.47	▲2.02
Independent gain from Alliance		Swing		-

Negeri Sembilan state election, 1964
Party	Candidate	Votes	%	∆%
Alliance	Han Hiu Fong	3,855	51.15	▼0.28
Socialist Front	M. S. Maniam	2,314	30.70	▼17.87
UDP	Ong Ping Ling	1,368	18.15	▲18.15
Total valid votes		7,537	100.00	
Total rejected ballots		218		
Unreturned ballots		0		
Turnout		7,755	81.28	▲16.48
Registered electors		9,541		
Majority		1,541	20.45	▲17.59
Alliance hold		Swing		

Negeri Sembilan state election, 1959
Party	Candidate	Votes	%
Alliance	Han Hiu Fong	2,263	51.43
Socialist Front	Robert Singam	2,137	48.57
Total valid votes		4,400	100.00
Total rejected ballots		51	
Unreturned ballots		0	
Turnout		4,451	64.80
Registered electors		6,869	
Majority		126	2.86
This was a new constituency created.
