= 1969 Malaysian state elections =

State assembly elections were held in Malaysia on 10 May 1969, alongside general elections.

== Results ==
=== Johore ===
Party or alliance		Votes	%	Seats	+/–
Alliance Party	United Malays National Organisation	109,051	42.35	19	–1
Alliance Party	Malaysian Chinese Association	52,700	20.46	10	–1
Alliance Party	Malaysian Indian Congress	5,549	2.15	1	0
Alliance Party	Total	167,300	64.97	30	–2
Democratic Action Party		45,076	17.50	1	New
Pan-Malaysian Islamic Party		16,645	6.46	0	0
Parti Gerakan Rakyat Malaysia		4,872	1.89	0	New
Parti Ra'ayat		1,492	0.58	0	0
Independents		22,131	8.59	1	+1
Total		257,516	100.00	32	0
Valid votes		257,516	92.63		
Invalid/blank votes		20,486	7.37		
Total votes		278,002	100.00		
Registered voters/turnout		383,813	72.43		
Source: Almanak Keputusan Pilihan Raya Umum: Parlimen & Dewan Undangan Negeri (1959-1999)

Total Electorate for Johor (1969) is 436620. Registered voter count above refers to total electorate of contested seats excluding 4 uncontested seats

=== Kedah ===
Party or alliance		Votes	%	Seats	+/–
Alliance Party	United Malays National Organisation	113,389	41.31	12	–7
Alliance Party	Malaysian Chinese Association	27,382	9.98	2	–2
Alliance Party	Malaysian Indian Congress	5,043	1.84	0	–1
Alliance Party	Total	145,814	53.13	14	–10
Pan-Malaysian Islamic Party		113,292	41.28	8	+8
Parti Gerakan Rakyat Malaysia		15,359	5.60	2	New
Total		274,465	100.00	24	0
Valid votes		274,465	93.72		
Invalid/blank votes		18,399	6.28		
Total votes		292,864	100.00		
Registered voters/turnout		388,167	75.45		
Source: Almanak Keputusan Pilihan Raya Umum: Parlimen & Dewan Undangan Negeri (1959-1999)

=== Kelantan ===
Party or alliance		Votes	%	Seats	+/–
Pan-Malaysian Islamic Party		123,231	52.23	19	–2
Alliance Party	United Malays National Organisation	107,376	45.51	10	+2
Alliance Party	Malaysian Chinese Association	4,641	1.97	1	0
Alliance Party	Total	112,017	47.48	11	+2
Independents		693	0.29	0	0
Total		235,941	100.00	30	0
Valid votes		235,941	94.88		
Invalid/blank votes		12,733	5.12		
Total votes		248,674	100.00		
Registered voters/turnout		333,754	74.51		
Source: Almanak Keputusan Pilihan Raya Umum: Parlimen & Dewan Undangan Negeri (1959-1999)

=== Malacca ===
Party or alliance		Votes	%	Seats	+/–
Alliance Party	United Malays National Organisation	34,592	33.40	11	–2
Alliance Party	Malaysian Chinese Association	13,427	12.96	4	0
Alliance Party	Malaysian Indian Congress	1,761	1.70	0	–1
Alliance Party	Total	49,780	48.06	15	–3
Pan-Malaysian Islamic Party		17,636	17.03	0	0
Parti Ra'ayat		16,529	15.96	0	0
Democratic Action Party		13,165	12.71	4	New
Parti Gerakan Rakyat Malaysia		4,591	4.43	1	New
Independents		1,877	1.81	0	0
Total		103,578	100.00	20	0
Valid votes		103,578	95.00		
Invalid/blank votes		5,453	5.00		
Total votes		109,031	100.00		
Registered voters/turnout		147,765	73.79		

=== Negeri Sembilan ===
Party or alliance		Votes	%	Seats	+/–
Alliance Party	United Malays National Organisation	31,700	28.74	11	–3
Alliance Party	Malaysian Chinese Association	16,624	15.07	4	–5
Alliance Party	Malaysian Indian Congress	2,651	2.40	1	0
Alliance Party	Total	50,975	46.21	16	–8
Democratic Action Party		40,185	36.43	8	New
Pan-Malaysian Islamic Party		11,685	10.59	0	0
United Malaysia Chinese Organization		2,131	1.93	0	New
Parti Ra'ayat		586	0.53	0	0
Independents		4,753	4.31	0	0
Total		110,315	100.00	24	0
Valid votes		110,315	94.46		
Invalid/blank votes		6,475	5.54		
Total votes		116,790	100.00		
Registered voters/turnout		155,620	75.05		

Total Electorate of Negeri Sembilan (1969): 170728. Registered voters above refer to total electorate of contested seats excluding two uncontested seats

=== Pahang ===
Party or alliance		Votes	%	Seats	+/–
Alliance Party	United Malays National Organisation	39,998	39.38	16	–1
Alliance Party	Malaysian Chinese Association	15,963	15.72	4	–3
Alliance Party	Total	55,961	55.10	20	–4
Pan-Malaysian Islamic Party		17,097	16.83	0	0
Parti Ra'ayat		10,798	10.63	2	+2
Parti Gerakan Rakyat Malaysia		2,026	1.99	1	New
Democratic Action Party		1,728	1.70	0	New
Independents		13,947	13.73	1	+1
Total		101,557	100.00	24	0
Valid votes		101,557	92.81		
Invalid/blank votes		7,862	7.19		
Total votes		109,419	100.00		
Registered voters/turnout		153,124	71.46		
Source: Almanak Keputusan Pilihan Raya Umum: Parlimen & Dewan Undangan Negeri (1959-1999)

Total Electorate of Pahang (1969): 176768. Registered voters above refers to the total electorate of contested seats excluding 3 uncontested seats

=== Penang ===
Party or alliance		Votes	%	Seats	+/–
Parti Gerakan Rakyat Malaysia		97,143	46.83	16	New
Alliance Party	United Malays National Organisation	36,535	17.61	4	–6
Alliance Party	Malaysian Chinese Association	28,949	13.96	0	–6
Alliance Party	Malaysian Indian Congress	6,288	3.03	0	–2
Alliance Party	Total	71,772	34.60	4	–14
Democratic Action Party		17,336	8.36	3	New
Pan-Malaysian Islamic Party		14,514	7.00	0	0
Parti Ra'ayat		2,390	1.15	1	+1
People's Progressive Party		743	0.36	0	0
Independents		3,537	1.71	0	0
Total		207,435	100.00	24	0
Valid votes		207,435	94.61		
Invalid/blank votes		11,819	5.39		
Total votes		219,254	100.00		
Registered voters/turnout		282,401	77.64		
Source: Almanak Keputusan Pilihan Raya Umum: Parlimen & Dewan Undangan Negeri (1959-1999)

=== Perak ===
Party or alliance		Votes	%	Seats	+/–
Alliance Party	United Malays National Organisation	114,294	27.41	18	–4
Alliance Party	Malaysian Chinese Association	64,398	15.44	1	–11
Alliance Party	Malaysian Indian Congress	3,123	0.75	0	–1
Alliance Party	Total	181,815	43.60	19	–16
People's Progressive Party		102,307	24.53	12	+7
Pan-Malaysian Islamic Party		76,971	18.46	1	+1
Democratic Action Party		39,590	9.49	6	New
Parti Gerakan Rakyat Malaysia		15,922	3.82	2	New
Independents		384	0.09	0	–
Total		416,989	100.00	40	0
Valid votes		416,989	93.09		
Invalid/blank votes		30,935	6.91		
Total votes		447,924	100.00		
Registered voters/turnout		613,572	73.00		
Source: Almanak Keputusan Pilihan Raya Umum: Parlimen & Dewan Undangan Negeri (1959-1999)

=== Perlis ===
Party or alliance		Votes	%	Seats	+/–
Alliance Party	United Malays National Organisation	18,201	43.07	9	0
Alliance Party	Malaysian Chinese Association	4,414	10.44	2	0
Alliance Party	Total	22,615	53.51	11	0
Pan-Malaysian Islamic Party		18,528	43.84	1	0
Parti Ra'ayat		1,119	2.65	0	0
Total		42,262	100.00	12	0
Valid votes		42,262	93.92		
Invalid/blank votes		2,735	6.08		
Total votes		44,997	100.00		
Registered voters/turnout		56,060	80.27		
Source: Almanak Keputusan Pilihan Raya Umum: Parlimen & Dewan Undangan Negeri (1959-1999)

=== Sarawak ===
Party or alliance		Votes	%	Seats
Sarawak United Peoples' Party		72,178	28.82	12
Sarawak Alliance	Parti Bumiputera Sarawak	33,990	13.57	11
Sarawak Alliance	Sarawak Chinese Association	29,768	11.89	4
Sarawak Alliance	Total	63,668	25.42	15
Sarawak National Party		61,241	24.45	12
Parti Pesaka Sarawak		34,281	13.69	8
Independents		18,987	7.58	1
Total		250,445	100.00	48
Valid votes		250,445	94.04	
Invalid/blank votes		15,870	5.96	
Total votes		266,315	100.00	
Registered voters/turnout		332,737	80.04	
Source: Almanak Keputusan Pilihan Raya Umum: Parlimen & Dewan Undangan Negeri (1959-1999)Tindak Malaysia Github

=== Selangor ===
Party or alliance		Votes	%	Seats	+/–
Alliance Party	United Malays National Organisation	61,452	19.88	12	–1
Alliance Party	Malaysian Chinese Association	54,079	17.50	1	–7
Alliance Party	Malaysian Indian Congress	12,899	4.17	1	–2
Alliance Party	Total	128,430	41.56	14	–10
Democratic Action Party		96,016	31.07	9	New
Parti Gerakan Rakyat Malaysia		50,993	16.50	4	New
Pan-Malaysian Islamic Party		29,703	9.61	0	0
Independents		3,916	1.27	1	+1
Total		309,058	100.00	28	0
Valid votes		309,058	92.68		
Invalid/blank votes		24,392	7.32		
Total votes		333,450	100.00		
Registered voters/turnout		506,335	65.86		
Source: Almanak Keputusan Pilihan Raya Umum: Parlimen & Dewan Undangan Negeri (1959-1999)

Total Electorate of Selangor (1969): 516982. Registered voters above refers to total electorate of contested seats excluding the uncontested seat of Dengkil

=== Trengganu ===
Party or alliance		Votes	%	Seats	+/–
Alliance Party	United Malays National Organisation	59,384	47.60	12	–8
Alliance Party	Malaysian Chinese Association	2,111	1.69	1	0
Alliance Party	Total	61,495	49.29	13	–8
Pan-Malaysian Islamic Party		61,619	49.39	11	+8
Parti Ra'ayat		876	0.70	0	0
Independents		760	0.61	0	0
Total		124,750	100.00	24	0
Valid votes		124,750	92.65		
Invalid/blank votes		9,899	7.35		
Total votes		134,649	100.00		
Registered voters/turnout		179,365	75.07		
Source: Almanak Keputusan Pilihan Raya Umum: Parlimen & Dewan Undangan Negeri (1959-1999)
