= Yeow Chai Thiam =

Malaysian politician

Yang Berbahagia Dato' Yeow Chai Thiam DSNS
- 姚再添

Personal details
- Born: Yeow Chai Thiam; 19 April 1953 Port Dickson, Negeri Sembilan, Federation of Malaya (now Malaysia)
- Died: 7 January 2016 (aged 62) Port Dickson, Negeri Sembilan, Malaysia
- Citizenship: Malaysian
- Party: Malaysian Chinese Association (MCA)
- Other political affiliations: Barisan Nasional (BN)
- Education: National University of Malaysia (UKM)
- Occupation: Physician

Chinese name
- Chinese: 姚再添
- Hanyu Pinyin: Yáo Zàitiān
- Jyutping: Jiu4 Zoi3 Tim1
- Hokkien POJ: Iâu Chài-thiam
- Tâi-lô: Iâu Tsài-thiam

Yeow Chai Thiam (姚再添; 19 April 1953 – 7 January 2016) was a Malaysian politician and medical doctor. He was a Malaysian Federal Senator for one term, gaining an appointment in 2009. He was a member of the Conservative Malaysian Chinese Association (MCA) and the former MCA Chairman for the state of Negeri Sembilan, the MCA is part of the Federal ruling Barisan Nasional (BN) coalition which has been Malaysia's ruling political party since independence in 1963. Yeow served as the Assemblyman for Jimah and Lukut in the Negeri Sembilan State Legislative Assembly for 20 years and was the State EXCO for Utilities and Local Government for two terms.

== Personal life ==
Yeow was born and lived in Port Dickson, and was married with two children.

== Education ==
Yeow studied medicine in the National University of Malaysia (UKM) and received his Doctors of Human Letters from Summit University of Louisiana.

== Founder of Mawar Renal Medical Center ==
Yeow was the founder and Chairman of Mawar Renal Medical Centre, a non-profit General Hospital with the largest network of kidney dialysis centres in Malaysia comprising a total of 14 branches. The centre is renowned for making a profit in other hospital services in order to provide free or subsidised treatment for low income dialysis patients, and is one of the major contributions by the Late Dr Yeow to Malaysian society.

== Death ==
Yeow died at the age of 63 after a long battle with cancer at his home at Port Dickson on 7 January 2016.

== Election results ==
Negeri Sembilan State Legislative Assembly
Year	Constituency	Candidate	Votes	Pct	Opponent(s)	Votes	Pct	Ballots cast	Majority	Turnout
1986	N23 Jimah	Yeow Chai Thiam (MCA)	4,571	46.82%	M Kuppusamy (DAP)	4,795	49.12%	9,762	224	78.33%
1986	N23 Jimah	Yeow Chai Thiam (MCA)	4,571	46.82%	John Fernandez (PPPM)	64	0.66%	9,762	224	78.33%
1990	N23 Jimah	Yeow Chai Thiam (MCA)	6,684	58.70%	Hu Sepang (DAP)	4,373	38.40%	11,387	2,311	78.23%
1995	N32 Lukut	Yeow Chai Thiam (MCA)	8,926	65.48%	Chen Hun Chong (DAP)	4,289	31.46%	13,632	4,637	74.79%
1999	N32 Lukut	Yeow Chai Thiam (MCA)	8,055	59.37%	Lee Fui Ming (DAP)	5,122	37.75%	13,568	2,933	72.53%
2004	N30 Lukut	Yeow Chai Thiam (MCA)	4,471	58.51%	Wong Hong Chuan (DAP)	2,967	38.82%	7,642	1,504	75.45%

Parliament of Malaysia
Year	Constituency	Candidate	Votes	Pct	Opponent(s)	Votes	Pct	Ballots cast	Majority	Turnout
2008	P130 Rasah	Yeow Chai Thiam (MCA)	21,120	38.13%	Loke Siew Fook (DAP)	34,271	61.87%	56,654	13,151	78.56%
2013	P128 Seremban	Yeow Chai Thiam (MCA)	33,075	38.52%	Loke Siew Fook (DAP)	45,628	53.12%	87,617	12,553	85.64%
2013	P128 Seremban	Yeow Chai Thiam (MCA)	33,075	38.52%	Abdul Halim Abdullah (Berjasa)	6,866	8.00%	87,617	12,553	85.64%
2013	P128 Seremban	Yeow Chai Thiam (MCA)	33,075	38.52%	John Fernandez (IND)	221	0.26%	87,617	12,553	85.64%
2013	P128 Seremban	Yeow Chai Thiam (MCA)	33,075	38.52%	Bujang Abu (IND)	83	0.10%	87,617	12,553	85.64%

== Honours ==
- Negeri Sembilan
  - Knight Companion of the Order of Loyalty to Negeri Sembilan (DSNS) – Dato' (1996)
