= 1969 Malaysian general election =

- 10 May 1969 – 4 July 1970

All 144 seats in the Dewan Rakyat 73 seats needed for a majority
- Registered: 3,439,707
- Turnout: 73.59%
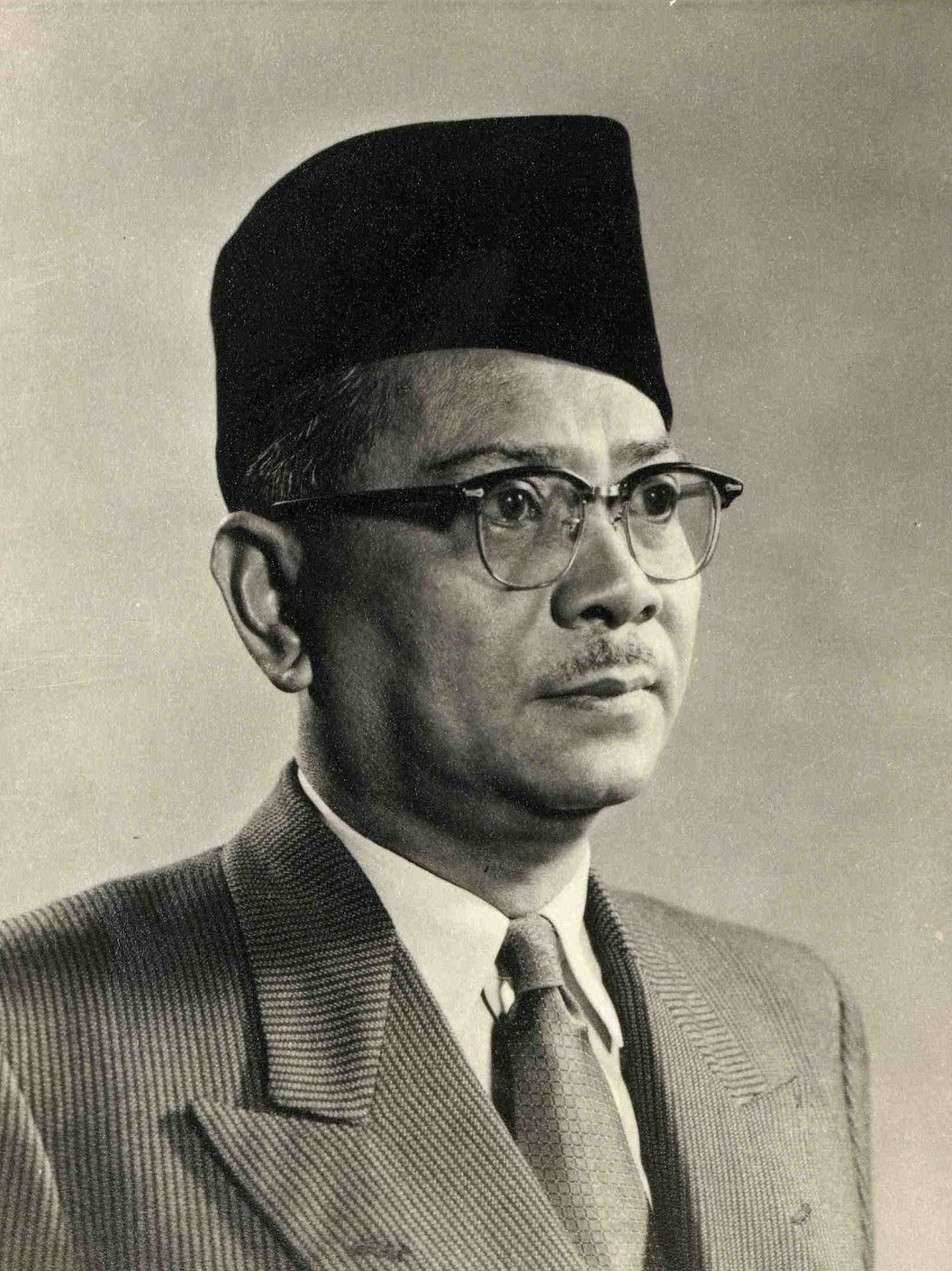

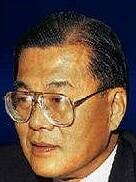

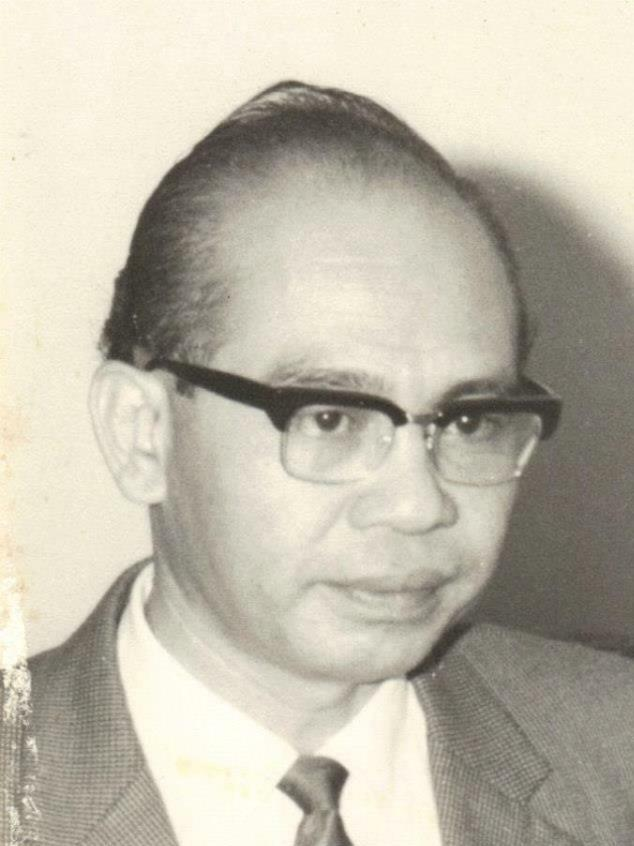

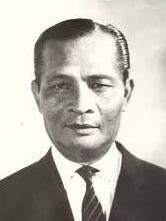

	First party	Second party	Third party
Leader	Tunku Abdul Rahman	Burhanuddin al-Helmy	Goh Hock Guan
Party	Alliance	PAS	DAP
Last election	58.53%, 89 seats	14.64%, 9 seats	2.05%, 1 seat
Seats won	74	12	13
Seat change	▼15	▲3	▲12
Popular vote	1,077,499	501,123	286,606
Percentage	44.96%	20.91%	11.96%
Swing	▼13.57pp	▲6.27pp	▲9.91pp
	Fourth party	Fifth party	Sixth party
	GER		SUP
Leader	Syed Hussein Alatas	S. P. Seenivasagam	Ong Kee Hui
Party	GERAKAN	PPP	SUPP
Last election	–	3.40%, 2 seats	3 seats
Seats won	8	4	5
Seat change	New	▲2	▲2
Popular vote	178,971	80,756	72,754
Percentage	7.47%	3.37%	3.04%
Swing	New	▼0.04pp	–
	Seventh party	Eighth party	Ninth party
Leader	Stephen Kalong Ningkan	Mustapha Harun	Jugah Barieng
Party	SNAP	USNO	Pesaka
Last election	4 seats	6 seats	–
Seats won	9	13	2
Seat change	▲5	▲7	New
Popular vote	64,593	13,634	30,765
Percentage	2.69%	0.57%	1.28%
Swing	–	–	New
Prime Minister before election
Tunku Abdul Rahman
Alliance
Prime Minister-designate
Tunku Abdul Rahman
Alliance

General elections were held in Malaysia on Saturday, 10 May 1969, although polling in Sabah and Sarawak was postponed until between 6 June and 4 July 1970. This was the first parliamentary election in Sabah and Sarawak since the formation of Malaysia in 1963. The ruling Alliance Party, consisting of the United Malays National Organisation (UMNO), the Malayan Chinese Association (MCA) and the Malayan Indian Congress (MIC), retained power but with a reduced majority. The Parti Gerakan Rakyat Malaysia (Gerakan) and the Democratic Action Party (DAP), both of which campaigned against the Bumiputra privileges set out in Article 153 of the Constitution which they considered to be a form of institutional racism, made significant gains. Voter turnout was 73.6 percent. The opposition collectively won 54 seats, causing the Alliance to lose its two-thirds parliamentary majority for the first time, a threshold required to pass most constitutional amendments.

The election also saw the Alliance lose control of the state governments in Perak, Selangor, Penang and Kelantan. The result and its aftermath triggered widespread racial violence in Kuala Lumpur on 13 May 1969, which saw hundreds of deaths, known as the 13 May incident. In response, the federal government declared a state of emergency and suspended parliament, placing the country under the administration of the National Operations Council (NOC) until 1971. The incident left deep political and social scars and marked a turning point in Malaysian politics.

The crisis also signalled the end of Tunku Abdul Rahman's more moderate premiership. He was succeeded several months later by Tun Abdul Razak, who pursued a more hard-line agenda and sought to further entrench Malay special rights under the Ketuanan Melayu ideology. Razak's government introduced policies to restructure society in favour of the Malays and sought to consolidate federal control. Among his initiatives was the launch of the New Economic Policy (NEP), an affirmative action program, and the creation of the Federal Territory of Kuala Lumpur, which was separated from Selangor in 1974. State elections also took place in 330 state constituencies in 12 (out of 13, except Sabah) states of Malaysia on the same day.

== Results ==
=== Overview ===
Candidates were returned uncontested in 20 constituencies, with voting in one constituency postponed. West Malaysia went to the polls on 10 May, with Sabah scheduled to vote on 25 May and Sarawak on 7 June. The Alliance Party secured eight seats on nomination day, being unopposed in several constituencies, while Datu Mustapha Datu Harun's United Sabah National Organisation (USNO) won 10 of Sabah's 16 seats unopposed. At the state level, the Alliance suffered significant setbacks, continuing to lose to the Malaysian Islamic Party (PAS) in Kelantan and to the newly formed Gerakan in Penang. No party commanded an outright majority in two other states, with the Alliance holding only 14 out of 24 seats in Selangor and 19 out of 40 in Perak.

The erosion of Malay support for the Alliance Party was more pronounced than that of non-Malays. In West Malaysia, Malay opposition parties saw their vote share rise sharply from around 15 percent in 1964 to 25 percent in 1969, while support for non-Malay opposition parties remained largely unchanged at about 26 percent in both elections. Despite these gains, the electoral system limited their seat increases. PAS rose from nine to 12 parliamentary seats, while the Democratic Action Party (DAP), a predominantly non-Malay party formed from the Malayan remnants of Singapore's People's Action Party (PAP) after the latter's expulsion from Malaysia, expanded from one to 13 seats. These shifts reflected the growing fragmentation of the electorate and signalled deeper political challenges for the Alliance in the years ahead.

=== Dewan Rakyat ===
Party or alliance		Votes	%	Seats	+/–
Alliance Party	United Malays National Organisation	1,077,499	44.96	52	–7
Alliance Party	Malaysian Chinese Association	1,077,499	44.96	13	–14
Alliance Party	Parti Bumiputera Sarawak	1,077,499	44.96	5	–3
Alliance Party	Malaysian Indian Congress	1,077,499	44.96	2	–1
Alliance Party	Sarawak Chinese Association	1,077,499	44.96	2	–2
Alliance Party	Total	1,077,499	44.96	74	–22
Pan-Malayan Islamic Party		501,123	20.91	12	+3
Democratic Action Party		286,606	11.96	13	+12
Parti Gerakan Rakyat Malaysia		178,971	7.47	8	New
People's Progressive Party		80,756	3.37	4	+2
Sarawak United Peoples' Party		72,754	3.04	5	+2
Sarawak National Party		64,593	2.69	9	+5
Parti Pesaka Sarawak		30,765	1.28	2	New
Parti Sosialis Rakyat Malaysia		27,110	1.13	0	0
Sabah Chinese Association		18,313	0.76	3	–1
United Sabah National Organisation		13,634	0.57	13	+7
United Malaysia Chinese Organisation		1,808	0.08	0	New
Independents		42,904	1.79	1	+1
Total		2,396,836	100.00	144	–15
Valid votes		2,396,836	94.68		
Invalid/blank votes		134,605	5.32		
Total votes		2,531,441	100.00		
Registered voters/turnout		3,439,707	73.59		
Source: CLEA Tindak Malaysia Github

Sarawak Alliance contested under Alliance Flag (though not formally under Alliance pact)

Total Electorate (1969): 3843182. Registered voters shown above refer to the contested constituencies (excluding 20 parliamentary uncontested seats

=== Results by state ===
Source:Tindak Malaysia GitHub

==== Johore ====
Party or alliance		Votes	%	Seats	+/–
Alliance Party	United Malays National Organisation	82,938	42.21	11	0
Alliance Party	Malaysian Chinese Association	49,916	25.40	5	0
Alliance Party	Total	132,854	67.62	16	0
Democratic Action Party		42,301	21.53	0	New
Parti Gerakan Rakyat Malaysia		8,211	4.18	0	New
Pan-Malayan Islamic Party		7,933	4.04	0	0
Independents		5,183	2.64	0	–
Total		196,482	100.00	16	0
Valid votes		196,482	94.02		
Invalid/blank votes		12,505	5.98		
Total votes		208,987	100.00		
Registered voters/turnout		287,936	72.58		

Total Electorate for Johor (1969): 436 620. Above registered voter count is based on electorate of contested seats (excluding 5 uncontested seats)

==== Kedah ====
Party or alliance		Votes	%	Seats	+/–
Alliance Party	United Malays National Organisation	127,580	45.20	7	–3
Alliance Party	Malaysian Chinese Association	23,397	8.29	2	0
Alliance Party	Total	150,977	53.49	9	–3
Pan-Malayan Islamic Party		115,861	41.05	3	+3
Parti Gerakan Rakyat Malaysia		15,402	5.46	0	New
Total		282,240	100.00	12	0
Valid votes		282,240	96.21		
Invalid/blank votes		11,133	3.79		
Total votes		293,373	100.00		
Registered voters/turnout		388,167	75.58		

==== Kelantan ====
Party or alliance		Votes	%	Seats	+/–
Pan-Malayan Islamic Party		126,409	52.40	6	–2
Alliance Party	United Malays National Organisation	114,593	47.50	4	+2
Independents		235	0.10	0	–
Total		241,237	100.00	10	0
Valid votes		241,237	96.94		
Invalid/blank votes		7,626	3.06		
Total votes		248,863	100.00		
Registered voters/turnout		333,754	74.56		

==== Malacca ====
Party or alliance		Votes	%	Seats	+/–
Alliance Party	United Malays National Organisation	30,458	28.80	2	0
Alliance Party	Malaysian Chinese Association	21,136	19.98	1	–1
Alliance Party	Total	51,594	48.78	3	–1
Democratic Action Party		18,562	17.55	1	New
Pan-Malayan Islamic Party		20,524	19.40	0	0
Parti Sosialis Rakyat Malaysia		12,436	11.76	0	0
Independents		2,655	2.51	0	0
Total		105,771	100.00	4	0
Valid votes		105,771	95.87		
Invalid/blank votes		4,561	4.13		
Total votes		110,332	100.00		
Registered voters/turnout		147,765	74.67		

==== Negri Sembilan ====
Party or alliance		Votes	%	Seats	+/–
Alliance Party	United Malays National Organisation	24,335	24.37	3	0
Alliance Party	Malaysian Chinese Association	15,350	15.37	0	–2
Alliance Party	Malaysian Indian Congress	6,606	6.62	0	–1
Alliance Party	Total	46,291	46.36	3	0
Democratic Action Party		35,446	35.50	3	New
Pan-Malayan Islamic Party		16,299	16.32	0	0
United Malaysia Chinese Organisation		1,808	1.81	0	0
Total		99,844	100.00	6	0
Valid votes		99,844	93.43		
Invalid/blank votes		7,023	6.57		
Total votes		106,867	100.00		
Registered voters/turnout		142,983	74.74		

Total Electorate for Negri Sembilan (1969): 170 128. Above registered voter count is based on electorate of contested seats (excluding 1 uncontested seat of Rembau-Tampin)

==== Pahang ====
Party or alliance		Votes	%	Seats	+/–
Alliance Party	United Malays National Organisation	48,507	60.84	5	0
Alliance Party	Malaysian Chinese Association	0	0.00	1	0
Alliance Party	Total	48,507	60.84	0	0
Pan-Malayan Islamic Party		19,458	24.41	0	0
Parti Sosialis Rakyat Malaysia		11,764	14.75	0	0
Total		79,729	100.00	6	0
Valid votes		79,729	94.19		
Invalid/blank votes		4,916	5.81		
Total votes		84,645	100.00		
Registered voters/turnout		119,254	70.98		

Total Electorate for Pahang (1969): 176768. Above registered voter count is based on electorate of contested seats (excluding 2 uncontested seats which includes MCA seat)

==== Penang ====
Party or alliance		Votes	%	Seats	+/–
Parti Gerakan Rakyat Malaysia		83,670	44.55	5	New
Alliance Party	United Malays National Organisation	45,715	24.34	1	–3
Alliance Party	Malaysian Chinese Association	23,510	12.52	1	–1
Alliance Party	Total	69,225	36.86	2	0
Democratic Action Party		20,930	11.14	1	New
Pan-Malayan Islamic Party		13,211	7.03	0	0
People's Progressive Party		775	0.41	0	0
Total		187,811	100.00	8	0
Valid votes		187,811	94.06		
Invalid/blank votes		11,860	5.94		
Total votes		199,671	100.00		
Registered voters/turnout		257,608	77.51		

Total Electorate for Penang (1969): 282401. Above registered voter count is based on electorate of contested seats (excluding the uncontested seat of Bagan)

==== Perak ====
Party or alliance		Votes	%	Seats	+/–
Alliance Party	United Malays National Organisation	97,612	22.91	7	–2
Alliance Party	Malaysian Chinese Association	78,262	18.37	1	–7
Alliance Party	Malaysian Indian Congress	7,985	1.87	1	0
Alliance Party	Total	183,859	43.16	9	–9
Democratic Action Party		68,651	16.12	5	New
People's Progressive Party		79,981	18.78	4	+2
Pan-Malayan Islamic Party		76,158	17.88	1	+1
Parti Gerakan Rakyat Malaysia		15,641	3.67	1	New
Independents		1,691	0.40	0	0
Total		425,981	100.00	20	0
Valid votes		425,981	95.08		
Invalid/blank votes		22,055	4.92		
Total votes		448,036	100.00		
Registered voters/turnout		613,572	73.02		

==== Perlis ====
Party or alliance		Votes	%	Seats	+/–
Alliance Party	United Malays National Organisation	22,195	51.15	2	0
Pan-Malayan Islamic Party		18,286	42.14	0	0
Parti Sosialis Rakyat Malaysia		2,910	6.71	0	New
Total		43,391	100.00	2	0
Valid votes		43,391	96.46		
Invalid/blank votes		1,591	3.54		
Total votes		44,982	100.00		
Registered voters/turnout		56,060	80.24		

==== Sabah ====
Party or alliance		Votes	%	Seats	+/–
Sabah Alliance	United Sabah National Organisation	13,634	30.59	13	0
Sabah Alliance	Sabah Chinese Association	18,313	41.09	3	0
Sabah Alliance	Total	31,947	71.67	–	16
Independents		12,626	28.33	0	0
Total		44,573	100.00	16	0
Valid votes		44,573	96.83		
Invalid/blank votes		1,458	3.17		
Total votes		46,031	100.00		
Registered voters/turnout		63,522	72.46		

Total Electorate (1969):208861. Above registered voter count only refers to total electorate of 5 seats. Remaining 11 seats were won uncontested

==== Sarawak ====
Party or alliance		Votes	%	Seats	+/–
Sarawak National Party		64,593	26.80	9	0
Sarawak United Peoples' Party		72,754	30.19	5	0
Sarawak Alliance	Parti Bumiputera Sarawak	41,835	17.36	5	–
Sarawak Alliance	Sarawak Chinese Association	10,520	4.37	2	–
Sarawak Alliance	Total	52,355	21.73	7	New
Parti Pesaka Sarawak		30,765	12.77	2	0
Independents		20,514	8.51	1	0
Total		240,981	100.00	24	0
Valid votes		240,981	90.93		
Invalid/blank votes		24,032	9.07		
Total votes		265,013	100.00		
Registered voters/turnout		332,737	79.65		

Sarawak Alliance contested under Alliance Flag

==== Selangor ====
Party or alliance		Votes	%	Seats	+/–
Alliance Party	United Malays National Organisation	59,634	18.58	6	0
Alliance Party	Malaysian Chinese Association	70,245	21.89	2	–3
Alliance Party	Malaysian Indian Congress	11,252	3.51	1	0
Alliance Party	Total	141,131	43.97	9	–3
Democratic Action Party		100,716	31.38	3	New
Parti Gerakan Rakyat Malaysia		56,047	17.46	2	New
Pan-Malayan Islamic Party		23,041	7.18	0	0
Total		320,935	100.00	14	0
Valid votes		320,935	94.39		
Invalid/blank votes		19,086	5.61		
Total votes		340,021	100.00		
Registered voters/turnout		516,984	65.77		

==== Trengganu ====
Party or alliance		Votes	%	Seats	+/–
Alliance Party	United Malays National Organisation	63,918	49.99	4	–1
Pan-Malayan Islamic Party		63,943	50.01	2	+1
Total		127,861	100.00	6	0
Valid votes		127,861	94.98		
Invalid/blank votes		6,759	5.02		
Total votes		134,620	100.00		
Registered voters/turnout		179,365	75.05		

== Aftermath ==
Gerakan and the Democratic Action Party (DAP) held a victory rally in Kuala Lumpur on 12 May. The gathering became increasingly disorderly when party members, who were largely Chinese, and Malay bystanders began exchanging racial epithets. In response and with tensions already running high, the United Malays National Organisation (UMNO) organised its own rally on 13 May, which escalated into full-scale rioting. The violence that ensued became known as the 13 May Incident, leading to hundreds of deaths.
