= Malayan Radical Party =

Defunct political party in Malaysia

- Leader: N.K. Menon (1952-1966); C.O. Lim (1951-1953); Dr. Lim Chong Eu (1953-1954)
- Founded: 1951
- Dissolved: 1966
- Headquarters: Penang
- National affiliation: Alliance (1954-1959)

The Malayan Radical Party (otherwise known as the Penang Radical Party) was a multiracial political party established in 1951, before the independence of Malaya, in the same year that another multiracial party, the Independence of Malaya Party (IMP), was founded. The party was founded by C.O. Lim, a prominent lawyer in Penang, and several former members of United Malays National Organisation (UMNO). The party had lost many of its members by 1954, including one of its leader and future Penang chief minister, Lim Chong Eu, who left to join the Malayan Chinese Association (MCA).

Under the leadership of N. K. Menon, the party joined the Penang Alliance Party in October 1954. However, one of its leaders, Oliver Phipps, contested against the Alliance in the 1959 Malayan General Election. The party was dissolved by Malaysia's Registrar of Societies in 1966.

== Inaugural Party Leadership ==
- Chairperson
  - C. O. Lim
- Deputy Chairpersons
  - S. M. Zainal Abidin
  - Lim Chong Eu
  - Chee Swee Lee
- Secretary General
  - Sonny Pillai
- Treasurer
  - Lee Chean Chu

== Electoral history ==
The Radical Party participated in the first election held in Malaya, the George Town Municipal Council election in Penang, which took place on 1 December 1951. Besides the Malayan Radical Party, the Malayan Labour Party and UMNO also contested in the election. The Radical Party succeeded in winning six of the nine seats on the George Town Municipal Council.

While part of the Alliance, the Radical Party jointly contested the first Penang state election, which was held on 19 February 1955. The Radical Party was allocated one seat, the Jelutong State Constituency, which was won by its candidate and party leader, N.K. Menon.

=== State elections ===
State election	State Legislative Assembly	
State election	Penang	Total won / Total contested
2/3 majority	2 / 3	
1955	1 / 25	1 / 1
1959	0 / 24	0 / 1

== See also ==
- List of political parties in Malaysia
- Politics of Malaysia
