= Kuala Langat (disambiguation) =

Kuala Langat is a district of Selangor, Malaysia.

Kuala Langat may also refer to:

- Kuala Langat (federal constituency), represented in the Dewan Rakyat
- Kuala Langat (state constituency), formerly represented in the Selangor State Council (1955–59)
