= Tan Phock Kin =

Tan Phock Kin, also known as Tan Hock Hin, was a former Malaysian MP and political detainee who spent 15 years in detention without trial.

He was elected to Malaysia's first Parliament in 1959 as a Socialist Front candidate for the Tanjong parliamentary constituency. He also served as a legislative councillor in George Town as well as state assemblyman for Jelutong (1964-1969) and Air Itam (1971-1974).

A former Labour Party of Malaya assistant secretary general, he was later a member of Gerakan and Pekemas.

== Biography ==
Originally a schoolteacher, Tan Phock Kin joined the Labour Party of Malaya and was one of those elected to the George Town municipal council in 1958. It was part of the Socialist Front wave led by D.S. Ramanathan who became mayor.

In 1959, in the first elections following Merdeka, he won the Tanjong parliamentary seat. Tan secured 11,333 votes winning by a majority of 4,885 over G.H. Goh of the Alliance Party, while the People's Progressive Party candidate Khoo Yat See trailed in third.

Tan was known as a fierce debater in Parliament and strongly voiced his objections to the proposed Internal Security Act which was drawn up in 1960.

Following Merdeka, initial public expectations of expanded civil liberties were met with criticism over the introduction of increasingly restrictive regulations and arbitrary legal enforcement.

“Is this then an occasion for rejoicing and merriment? I feel sure that all thinking people will agree that such an occasion should be one for mourning and not for celebration," he said at the time.

In 1962 he crossed swords in Parliament with Finance Minister Tan Siew Sin calling the minister's Budget speech 'most pathetic'. In their exchange the minister called him a liar but later withdrew that statement.

In 1963, the Labour Party and its Socialist Front allies was hit by waves of detentions without trial. Tan was not one of those detained at the time but it spelt the end of the party as a force.

In 1964, he failed to defend Tanjong, losing by 4,412 votes to Lim Chong Eu of the United Democratic Party in a contest that also featured All-England badminton champion David Choong and Tan Chong Bee of the PAP. He did however win the Jelutong state seat.

He was arrested in July 1967 for taking part in demonstrations against United States intervention in Vietnam and for protesting the Malaysian Government's decision to ban the United Malayan Estate Workers' Union.

He was detained under the ISA under suspicion of threatening national security and being a Communist United Front agent.

Tan was never formally charged, and had no opportunity to challenge the Government's allegations against him in open court. He spent many years detained at Batu Gajah Special Detention Camp and was eventually released in 1982.

Uniquely he won the Air Hitam state seat from detention in 1969 while representing Gerakan. In 1972, he was among the former Labour Party leaders who left Gerakan to form Pekemas after that party joined Barisan Nasional.

He contested Tanjong again in 1974 under the Pekemas banner, this time suffering a heavy defeat as Gerakan’s Lim Chong Eu and DAP’s Yeap Ghim Guan fought a close contest.

Upon his release in 1982, Tan Phock Kim became a practicising lawyer.

== Election results ==
Parliament of the Federation of Malaya
Year	Constituency	Candidate	Votes	Pct	Opponent(s)	Votes	Pct	Ballots cast	Majority	Turnout
1959	P036 Tanjong	Tan Phock Kin (Lab)	11,333	56.98%	G.H. Goh (MCA)	6,448	32.42%	20,125	4,885	71.65%
1959	P036 Tanjong	Tan Phock Kin (Lab)	11,333	56.98%	Khoo Yat See (PPP)	2,107	10.59%	20,125	4,885	71.65%

Parliament of Malaysia
Year	Constituency	Candidate	Votes	Pct	Opponent(s)	Votes	Pct	Ballots cast	Majority	Turnout
1964	P036 Tanjong	Tan Phock Kin (Lab)	8,516	29.89%	Lim Chong Eu (UDP)	12,928	45.37%	29,165	4,412	83.90%
1964	P036 Tanjong	Tan Phock Kin (Lab)	8,516	29.89%	David Choong Ewe Leong (MCA)	6,271	22.01%	29,165	4,412	83.90%
1964	P036 Tanjong	Tan Phock Kin (Lab)	8,516	29.89%	Tan Chong Bee (PAP)	778	2.73%	29,165	4,412	83.90%
1974	P042 Tanjong	Tan Phock Kin (PEKEMAS)	2,508	7.48%	Lim Chong Eu (Gerakan)	15,409	45.99%	34,312	1,440	73.44%
1974	P042 Tanjong	Tan Phock Kin (PEKEMAS)	2,508	7.48%	Yeap Ghim Guan (DAP)	13,969	41.69%	34,312	1,440	73.44%
1974	P042 Tanjong	Tan Phock Kin (PEKEMAS)	2,508	7.48%	Lee Kok Liang (PRM)	1,622	4.84%	34,312	1,440	73.44%

Penang State Legislative Assembly
Year	Constituency	Candidate	Votes	Pct	Opponent(s)	Votes	Pct	Ballots cast	Majority	Turnout
1964	N12 Jelutong	Tan Phock Kin (Lab)	4,999	46.68%	Khaw Kok Chwee (MCA)	3,159	29.50%	10,953	1,840	83.89%
1964	N12 Jelutong	Tan Phock Kin (Lab)	4,999	46.68%	Chang Lai Sum (UDP)	2,552	23.83%	10,953	1,840	83.89%
1969	N11 Ayer Itam	Tan Phock Kin (Gerakan)	7,014	76.80%	Khoo Leon Hun (MCA)	2,119	23.20%	9,475	4,895	76.60%
1974	N22 Padang Kota	Tan Phock Kin (PEKEMAS)	936	9.28%	Lim Chong Eu (Gerakan)	5,543	54.95%	10,385	2,240	78.81%
1974	N22 Padang Kota	Tan Phock Kin (PEKEMAS)	936	9.28%	Khoo Soo Giap (DAP)	3,303	32.74%	10,385	2,240	78.81%
1974	N22 Padang Kota	Tan Phock Kin (PEKEMAS)	936	9.28%	Lee Kok Liang (PSRM)	306	3.03%	10,385	2,240	78.81%
