= Hulu Selangor (disambiguation) =

Hulu Selangor or Ulu Selangor may refer to:

- Hulu Selangor District
- Hulu Selangor (federal constituency), represented in the Dewan Rakyat
- Selangor Ulu (state constituency), formerly represented in the Selangor State Council (1955–59), see List of Malayan State and Settlement Council Representatives (1954–1959)
