= Yeap Ghim Guan =

Malaysian politician

State Chairman of the Democratic Action Party of Penang
- In office 1965–1977

State Leader of the Opposition of Penang
- In office 1969–1974
- Governor: Syed Sheh Barakbah
- Constituency: Kelawei

Member of the Penang State Legislative Assembly for Kelawei
- In office 10 May 1969 – 24 August 1974
- Majority: 2,339 (1969)

Personal details
- Died: 12 March 2007 Penang, Malaysia
- Party: Democratic Action Party (DAP) (1965-1978); Socialist Democratic Party (Malaysia) (1978-1986); Malaysian Democratic Party (1999-2007)
- Spouse: Rita Wong Su Kee
- Children: 3
- Occupation: Politician, lawyer

Yeap Ghim Guan (1941 – 12 March 2007) is a Malaysian British-trained lawyer and politician. His political career began in Penang in the 1960s; Yeap served as state assemblyman for Kelawei for one term from 1969 to 1974.

He was one of the founder members of the Democratic Action Party (DAP), and served as the party's Penang chairman from 1965 to 1977. However, he left DAP after a bitter power struggle with the then secretary general Lim Kit Siang and co-founded two minor political parties.

These were the Socialist Democratic Party (SDP) in 1978 in which his main ally was fellow DAP exile Fan Yew Teng, and the Malaysian Democratic Party (MDP) in 1999, which was led by another DAP renegade Wee Choo Keong.

Yeap was well known for his aggressiveness, uncompromising stance and remarkable oratory skill. He once presented a 10-hour speech at the Penang Legislative Assembly in the 1970s. Another famous stunt was pledging to dive off the Penang Bridge if the then Chief Minister of Penang, Tun Lim Chong Eu, could successfully build Penang Bridge. He failed to fulfill this pledge when the bridge was completed.

However, his aggressive style ultimately proved to be his downfall; in 1974 he tore a poster of the then Prime Minister Tun Abdul Razak Hussein shaking hands with Mao Zedong after the former's ground-breaking trip to the People's Republic of China. Yeap's move was deemed disrespectful, particularly among older Malaysian Chinese.

After the incident, the quarrel with Lim Kit Siang and subsequent exit from the DAP, Yeap's political prominence gradually faded. His other attempts to launch new parties were never as successful as the DAP.

He died on 12 March 2007 after two years of long illness due to stroke.

== Election results ==
Parliament of Malaysia
Year	Constituency	Candidate	Votes	Pct	Opponent(s)	Votes	Pct	Ballots cast	Majority	Turnout
1974	P042 Tanjong	Yeap Ghim Guan (DAP)	13,969	41.69%	Lim Chong Eu (Gerakan)	15,409	45.99%	34,312	1,440	73.44%
1974	P042 Tanjong	Yeap Ghim Guan (DAP)	13,969	41.69%	Tan Phock Kin (PEKEMAS)	2,508	7.48%	34,312	1,440	73.44%
1974	P042 Tanjong	Yeap Ghim Guan (DAP)	13,969	41.69%	Lee Kok Liang (PSRM)	1,622	4.84%	34,312	1,440	73.44%
1978	P043 Jelutong	Yeap Ghim Guan (SDP)	2,401	5.22%	Karpal Singh Ram Singh (DAP)	23,606	51.33%	47,308	3,621	78.52%
1978	P043 Jelutong	Yeap Ghim Guan (SDP)	2,401	5.22%	Lee Him (Gerakan)	19,985	43.45%	47,308	3,621	78.52%
1982	P042 Tanjong	Yeap Ghim Guan (SDP)	464	1.04%	Koh Tsu Koon (Gerakan)	22,394	50.42%	45,317	834	77.16%
1982	P042 Tanjong	Yeap Ghim Guan (SDP)	464	1.04%	Chian Heng Kai (DAP)	21,560	48.54%	45,317	834	77.16%

Penang State Legislative Assembly
Year	Constituency	Candidate	Votes	Pct	Opponent(s)	Votes	Pct	Ballots cast	Majority	Turnout
1969	N08 Kelawei	Yeap Ghim Guan (DAP)	4,239	67.50%	Tan Khim Hoe (MCA)	1,850	29.46%	6,280	2,339	76.22%
1974	N23 Kampong Kolam	Yeap Ghim Guan (DAP)	4,279	32.24%	Khoo Khay Por (Gerakan)	5,458	41.12%	13,272	1,179	85.32%
1974	N23 Kampong Kolam	Yeap Ghim Guan (DAP)	4,279	32.24%	Wong Hoong Keat (PEKEMAS)	1,664	12.54%	13,272	1,179	85.32%
1974	N23 Kampong Kolam	Yeap Ghim Guan (DAP)	4,279	32.24%	Ho Ewe Seng (PSRM)	418	3.15%	13,272	1,179	85.32%
