= Hulu Langat (disambiguation) =

Hulu Langat or Ulu Langat may refer to:

- Hulu Langat District
- Hulu Langat (federal constituency), represented in the Dewan Rakyat
- Ulu Langat (state constituency), formerly represented in the Selangor State Council (1955–59), see List of Malayan State and Settlement Council Representatives (1954–1959)
