= Rembau =

Rembau may refer to:

- Rembau District, Malaysia
- Rembau (town)
- Rembau (federal constituency), represented in the Dewan Rakyat
- Rembau (state constituency), formerly represented in the Negri Sembilan State Council; see List of Malayan State and Settlement Council Representatives (1954–1959) § Negri Sembilan
