= Koh Tsu Koon =

Malaysian politician

Yang Berbahagia Tan Sri Koh Tsu Koon PSM
- 许子根
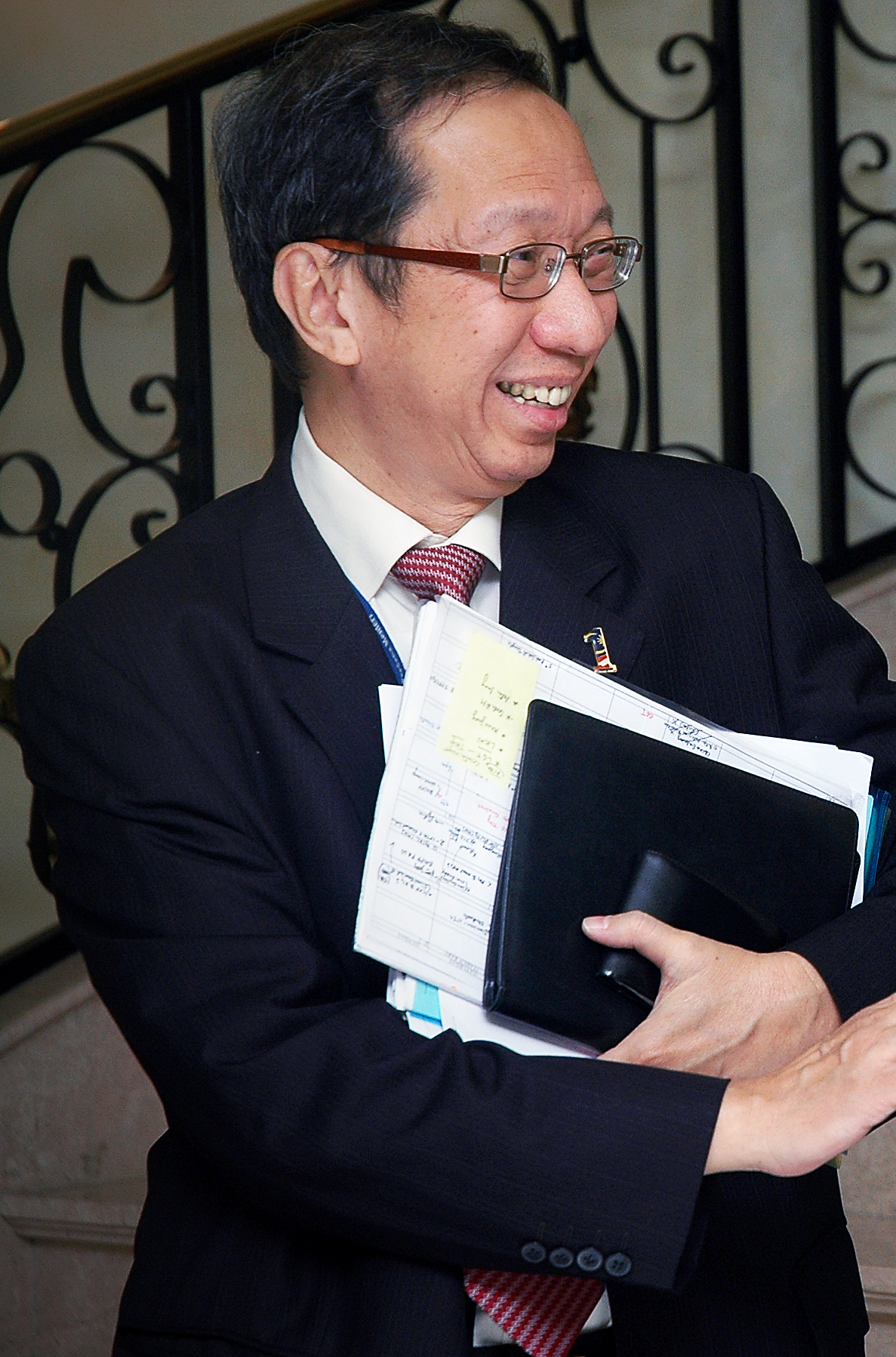
- Koh in 2011

Minister in the Prime Minister's Department
- In office 10 April 2009 – 15 May 2013 (Unity & Performance Management) Serving with Idris Jala
- Monarchs: Mizan Zainal Abidin (2009–2011); Abdul Halim (2009–2013)
- Prime Minister: Najib Razak
- Deputy: Devamany Krishnasamy
- Preceded by: Shafie Apdal as Minister of National Unity, Arts, Culture and Heritage
- Succeeded by: Joseph Kurup
- Constituency: Senator

3rd Chief Minister of Penang
- In office 25 October 1990 – 11 March 2008
- Governor: Hamdan Sheikh Tahir (1990–2001); Abdul Rahman Abbas (2001–2008)
- Deputy: Ibrahim Saad (1990–1995); Mohd Shariff Omar (1995–1999); Hilmi Yahaya (1999–2004); Abdul Rashid Abdullah (2004–2008)
- Preceded by: Lim Chong Eu
- Succeeded by: Lim Guan Eng
- Constituency: Tanjong Bunga

4th President of the Parti Gerakan Rakyat Malaysia
- In office 4 October 2008 – 16 May 2013
- Deputy: Chang Ko Youn
- Preceded by: Lim Keng Yaik
- Succeeded by: Chang Ko Youn (Acting); Mah Siew Keong

Senator Appointed by the Yang di-Pertuan Agong
- In office 9 April 2009 – 8 April 2015
- Monarchs: Mizan Zainal Abidin (2009–2011); Abdul Halim (2011–2015)
- Prime Minister: Najib Razak

Member of the Penang State Legislative Assembly for Tanjong Bunga
- In office 21 October 1990 – 8 March 2008
- Preceded by: Khoo Boo Yeang (BN–GERAKAN)
- Succeeded by: Teh Yee Cheu (DAP)
- Majority: 1,012 (1990); 7,703 (1995); 6,861 (1999); 6,224 (2004)

Member of the Malaysian Parliament for Tanjong
- In office 26 April 1982 – 3 August 1986
- Preceded by: Wong Hoong Keat (BN–GERAKAN)
- Succeeded by: Lim Kit Siang (DAP)
- Majority: 834 (1982)

Personal details
- Born: Koh Tsu Koon; 26 August 1949 (age 77) Penang, Federation of Malaya (now Malaysia)
- Citizenship: Malaysia
- Party: Parti Gerakan Rakyat Malaysia (GERAKAN) (since 1982)
- Other political affiliations: Barisan Nasional (BN) (1982–2018); Perikatan Nasional (PN) (since 2021)
- Spouse(s): Chui Kah Peng (徐嘉平, deceased)
- Children: 1 son, 1 daughter
- Education: Princeton University; University of Chicago (PhD)
- Occupation: Politician
- Profession: Educator

Koh Tsu Koon (born 26 August 1949; simplified Chinese: 许子根; traditional Chinese: 許子根; Pe̍h-ōe-jī: Khó͘ Chú-kun; pinyin: Xǔ Zǐgēn) is a Malaysian politician. He was the Chief Minister of Penang from 1990 to 2008, Member of Parliament (MP) for Tanjong from 1982 to 1986 and was appointed as a Senator from 2009 to 2015. A year after resigning as Chief Minister of Penang, Koh was appointed Minister in the Prime Minister's Department by Prime Minister Najib Razak. He was famously known for contributing in the Sungai Pinang campaign where he took almost 10 years and failed to complete it.

He was the fourth President of Parti Gerakan Rakyat Malaysia (GERAKAN), a former component Barisan Nasional (BN) coalition (currently a component of the Perikatan Nasional coalition) and also the first President of GERAKAN not named a candidate in the Malaysian General Election.

== Background ==
Koh Tsu Koon was born in Penang in 1949 and attended Phor Tay Primary School, Chung Ling High School and Methodist Boys' School. He graduated from Princeton University in 1970 with a degree in physics, and obtained his PhD from the University of Chicago in 1977 in Economics and Sociology of Education. He was a Fulbright scholar at Stanford University from 1980 to 1981.

Koh taught at Universiti Sains Malaysia (USM), Penang from 1975 and rose to become Deputy Dean of Education in 1978.

== Political career ==
Koh joined GERAKAN in 1982. He won the Tanjong parliamentary seat during the 1982 general election but lost it to Lim Kit Siang in the following 1986 general election. The following year, he was elected GERAKAN Youth Chairman. Koh was the protégé of then Penang Chief Minister Lim Chong Eu, serving as Lim's Political Secretary and Chief Aide from 1986 to 1990.

=== GERAKAN leadership ===
Koh became a Vice President of GERAKAN in 1991 and later Deputy President in 2005. On 8 April 2007, following the retirement of long-serving President Lim Keng Yaik, he took over the presidency in an acting capacity. He was formally elected as President in 2008.

=== Penang Chief Minister ===
In the 1990 general election, Chief Minister Lim Chong Eu lost his state seat. Koh, who was a first-term state Assemblyman from Tanjong Bunga, was selected to lead the Barisan Nasional government in Penang, and became the state's third Chief Minister.

Koh served four terms as Chief Minister for a total of 18 years from 1990 to 2008. In the 1995 general election, he was challenged in his state seat by Lim Kit Siang, who unseated the previous Chief Minister Lim Chong Eu in 1990. Koh beat Lim with over 70% of the votes. He stepped down in 2008 to contest the Batu Kawan parliamentary seat during the general election. Koh was said to be pressured into leaving his position as Chief Minister to join federal politics. He eventually lost the parliamentary contest, while the opposition pact led by the Democratic Action Party (DAP) won the state of Penang.

Koh remained visible in the political scene after the election, and even participated in a televised public debate with his successor as Chief Minister, Lim Guan Eng. He remained as GERAKAN President, winning the post permanently in October 2008.

=== Cabinet Minister ===
Koh joined federal politics when he was appointed as a Senator in the Dewan Negara. This paved the way for Prime Minister Najib Razak to name Koh in his inaugural Cabinet. He was appointed Minister in the Prime Minister's Department, in charge of unity and performance management. Koh was put in charge of Najib's Government Transformation Programme (GTP), which includes monitoring the performance of ministries and six national key result areas (NKRAs) through Key Performance Indicators (KPIs).

=== Stepping down as Penang BN leader ===
In August 2011, The Malaysian Insider reported that the Barisan Nasional (BN) leadership felt that Koh should step down as BN Chairman in Penang for the coalition to win back the state government in the 13th general election. It was further said that voters viewed Koh as indecisive and a symbol of the BN leadership which was rejected by voters in 2008. GERAKAN leaders reportedly encouraged Koh to leave Penang to contest the Simpang Renggam parliamentary seat, a GERAKAN safe seat in Johor.

== Resignation ==
On 16 May 2013, The Star reported that Koh officially resigned as the President of GERAKAN. His deputy, Chang Ko Youn, would take over as acting president until the party elections on 26 October 2013. Koh's resignation followed GERAKAN Secretary-General Teng Chang Yeow's earlier resignation as Penang Barisan Nasional Chairman and GERAKAN Secretary-General.

== Election results ==
Penang State Legislative Assembly
Year	Constituency	Candidate	Votes	Pct	Opponent(s)	Votes	Pct	Ballots cast	Majority	Turnout
1990	N19 Tanjong Bunga	Koh Tsu Koon (Gerakan)	7,585	52.40%	Gooi Hock Seng (DAP)	6,573	45.41%	14,474	1,012	74.75%
1995	N19 Tanjong Bunga	Koh Tsu Koon (Gerakan)	13,087	69.46%	Lim Kit Siang (DAP)	5,384	28.57%	18,842	7,703	77.79%
1999	N19 Tanjong Bunga	Koh Tsu Koon (Gerakan)	12,111	67.52%	Wong Hang Yoke (DAP)	5,250	29.27%	17,937	6,861	73,20%
2004	N22 Tanjong Bunga	Koh Tsu Koon (Gerakan)	8,985	73.01%	Lim Cheng Hoe (DAP)	2,761	22.44%	12,306	6,224	73.33%

Parliament of Malaysia
Year	Constituency	Candidate	Votes	Pct	Opponent(s)	Votes	Pct	Ballots cast	Majority	Turnout
1982	P042 Tanjong	Koh Tsu Koon (Gerakan)	22,394	50.42%	Chian Heng Kai (DAP)	21,560	48.54%	45,317	834	77.16%
1982	P042 Tanjong	Koh Tsu Koon (Gerakan)	22,394	50.42%	Yeap Ghim Guan (SDP)	464	1.04%	45,317	834	77.16%
1986	P045 Tanjong	Koh Tsu Koon (Gerakan)	15,921	36.57%	Lim Kit Siang (DAP)	27,611	63.43%	44,463	11,690	73.32%
2008	P046 Batu Kawan	Koh Tsu Koon (Gerakan)	13,582	37.06%	Ramasamy Palanisamy (DAP)	23,067	62.94%	37,292	9,485	78.71%

== Honours ==
=== Honours of Malaysia ===
- Malaysia
  - Commander of the Order of Loyalty to the Crown of Malaysia (PSM) – Tan Sri (1995)

== See also ==
- Members of the Dewan Negara, 12th Malaysian Parliament
- List of people who have served in both Houses of the Malaysian Parliament

Political offices
Preceded by Lim Keng Yaik	President of Parti Gerakan Rakyat Malaysia (Gerakan); 4 October 2008 – 16 May 2013	Succeeded by Chang Ko Youn (Acting President 16 May 2013 – 26 October 2013); Mah Siew Keong
Political offices
Preceded by Lim Chong Eu	Chief Minister of Penang; 1990–2008	Succeeded by Lim Guan Eng
