= Tanjong (federal constituency) =

Federal constituency of Penang, Malaysia

Tanjong (P049)
Penang constituency

Federal constituency
- Legislature: Dewan Rakyat
- MP: Lim Hui Ying; PH
- Constituency created: 1958
- First contested: 1959
- Last contested: 2022

Demographics
- Population (2020): 34,809
- Electors (2023): 52,265
- Area (km²): 6
- Pop. density (per km²): 5,801.5

Tanjong is a federal constituency in Northeast Penang Island District, Penang, Malaysia, that has been represented in the Dewan Rakyat since 1959.

The federal constituency was created in the 1958 redistribution and is mandated to return a single member to the Dewan Rakyat under the first-past-the-post voting system.

At 6 km^{2}, it is the smallest parliamentary constituency in Malaysia.

== Demographics ==
While this Malaysian parliamentary constituency has the third highest proportion of predominantly Chinese voters (behind Bandar Kuching and Kepong), Tanjong parliamentary area may be considered as the constituency area with the lowest proportion of Malay-Muslim voters in Peninsular Malaysia where it forms only less than 4% of the overall voters in the parliamentary area.

Ethnic breakdown of Tanjong's electorate as of 2022
1. Chinese (88.4%)
2. Indian (7.30%)
3. Malay (3.50%)
4. Other ethnicities (0.80%)

As of 2020, Tanjong has a population of 34,809 people.

Age breakdown of Tanjong's electorate as of 2022
1. 18-20 (1.94%)
2. 21-29 (8.53%)
3. 30-39 (12.4%)
4. 40-49 (14.7%)
5. 50-59 (19.4%)
6. 60-69 (22.2%)
7. 70-79 (13.3%)
8. 80-89 (4.78%)
9. above 90 (2.69%)
Gender breakdown of Tanjong's electorate as of 2022
1. Male (50.6%)
2. Female (49.4%)

== History ==
=== Polling districts ===
According to the federal gazette issued on 18 July 2023, the Tanjong constituency is divided into 37 polling districts.

State constituency	Polling districts	Code	Location
Padang Kota (N26)	Northam Road	049/26/01	SJK (C) Union
Padang Kota (N26)	Pykett Avenue	049/26/02	SJK (C) Union
Padang Kota (N26)	Rangoon Road	049/26/03	SMK (P) Methodist
Padang Kota (N26)	Nagore Road	049/26/04	SK Sri Tanjung
Padang Kota (N26)	Wellesley School	049/26/05	SK Wellesley
Padang Kota (N26)	Farquhar Street	049/26/06	SK Perempuan Island
Padang Kota (N26)	Lorong Argus	049/26/07	SMK St. Xavier
Padang Kota (N26)	Muntri Street	049/26/08	SJK (C) Shih Chung Pusat
Padang Kota (N26)	Kampong Malabar	049/26/09	SJK (C) Aik Hua
Padang Kota (N26)	Lorong Serk Chuan	049/26/10	SK Hutchings
Padang Kota (N26)	Lorong Pasar	049/26/11	SK Convent Lebuh Light
Padang Kota (N26)	Esplanade	049/26/12	Kolej Tingkatan Enam Hutchings
Padang Kota (N26)	Leboh Pasar	049/26/13	SK Convent Lebuh Light
Padang Kota (N26)	Leboh Ah Quee	049/26/14	SK Hutchings
Pengkalan Kota (N27)	Leboh Presgrave	049/27/01	SJK (C) Heng Ee
Pengkalan Kota (N27)	Jalan Magazine	049/27/02	SJK (C) Sum Min
Pengkalan Kota (N27)	Jalan Prangin	049/27/03	SJK (C) Sum Min
Pengkalan Kota (N27)	Leboh Victoria	049/27/04	SJK (C) Li Tek 'A'
Pengkalan Kota (N27)	Pengkalan Weld	049/27/05	SJK (C) Li Tek 'B'; SJK (C) Li Tek Cawangan
Pengkalan Kota (N27)	Gat Leboh Noordin	049/27/06	Dewan Komuniti Maccalum
Pengkalan Kota (N27)	Jalan C.Y.Choy	049/27/07	Dewan Li Tek Seah
Pengkalan Kota (N27)	Macallum Street	049/27/08	SJK (C) Eng Chuan
Pengkalan Kota (N27)	Leboh Cecil	049/27/09	SJK (C) Eng Chuan
Komtar (N28)	Dickens Street	049/28/01	SJK (C) Hu Yew Seah
Komtar (N28)	Leboh Cintra	049/28/02	Taman Bimbingan Kanak-Kanak (Tabika) Nurul Islam
Komtar (N28)	Kampung Kolam	049/28/03	Pusat Belia Lebuh Acheh
Komtar (N28)	Leboh Acheh	049/28/04	Pusat Belia Lebuh Acheh
Komtar (N28)	Leboh Melayu	049/28/05	SK Tan Sri P. Ramlee
Komtar (N28)	Hong Kong Street	049/28/06	George Town World Heritage Inc
Komtar (N28)	Komtar	049/28/07	Tapak Landskap B, Prangin Mall
Komtar (N28)	Madras Lane	049/28/08	SJK (C) Hu Yew Seah
Komtar (N28)	Jalan Timah	049/28/09	SK Tan Sri P. Ramlee
Komtar (N28)	Jalan Lines	049/28/10	SK Tan Sri P. Ramlee
Komtar (N28)	Jalan Dato' Kramat	049/28/11	The Penang Buddhist Association Kindergarten
Komtar (N28)	Irving Road	049/28/12	Pusat Kegiatan Guru Kelawai
Komtar (N28)	Jalan Pahang	049/28/13	The Penang Buddhist Association Kindergarten
Komtar (N28)	Jalan Kim Bian Aik	049/28/14	Persatuan Leong See Kah Miew

=== Representation history ===
Members of Parliament for Tanjong
Parliament	No	Years	Member	Party	Vote Share
Constituency created from George Town
Parliament of the Federation of Malaya
1st	P036	1959–1963	Tan Phock Kin (陈朴根)	SF (Lab)	11,333; 56.98%
Parliament of Malaysia
1st	P036	1963–1964	Tan Phock Kin (陈朴根)	SF (Lab)	11,333; 56.98%
2nd	P036	1964–1968	Lim Chong Eu (林苍佑)	UDP	12,928; 45.37%
2nd	P036	1968–1969	Lim Chong Eu (林苍佑)	GERAKAN	12,928; 45.37%
		1969–1971	Parliament was suspended		
3rd	P036	1971–1973	Lim Chong Eu (林苍佑)	GERAKAN	19,656; 78.85%
3rd	P036	1973–1974	Lim Chong Eu (林苍佑)	BN (GERAKAN)	19,656; 78.85%
4th	P042	1974–1978	Lim Chong Eu (林苍佑)	BN (GERAKAN)	15,409; 45.99%
5th	P042	1978–1981	Wong Hoong Keat (黄鸿杰)	DAP	19,260; 47.95%
5th	P042	1981–1982	Wong Hoong Keat (黄鸿杰)	BN (GERAKAN)	19,260; 47.95%
6th	P042	1982–1986	Koh Tsu Koon (许子根)	BN (GERAKAN)	22,394; 50.42%
7th	P045	1986–1990	Lim Kit Siang (林吉祥)	DAP	27,611; 63.43%
8th	P045	1990–1995	Lim Kit Siang (林吉祥)	GR (DAP)	30,954; 69.66%
9th	P048	1995–1999	Lim Kit Siang (林吉祥)	GR (DAP)	25,622; 56.75%
10th	P048	1999–2004	Chow Kon Yeow (曹观友)	BA (DAP)	23,437; 55.28%
11th	P049	2004–2008	Chow Kon Yeow (曹观友)	DAP	21,652; 55.41%
12th	P049	2008–2013	Chow Kon Yeow (曹观友)	PR (DAP)	28,248; 74.32%
13th	P049	2013–2015	Ng Wei Aik (黄伟益)	PR (DAP)	35,510; 83.80%
13th	P049	2015–2018	Ng Wei Aik (黄伟益)	PH (DAP)	35,510; 83.80%
14th	P049	2018–2022	Chow Kon Yeow (曹观友)	PH (DAP)	35,663; 87.25%
15th	P049	2022–present	Lim Hui Ying (林慧英)	PH (DAP)	31,968; 84.83%

=== State constituency ===
Parliamentary constituency	State constituency						
Parliamentary constituency	1955–1959*	1959–1974	1974–1986	1986–1995	1995–2004	2004–2018	2018–present
Tanjong			Kampong Kolam				
Tanjong						Komtar	
Tanjong		Kota					
Tanjong			Padang Kota				
Tanjong			Pengkalan Kota				
Tanjong		Tanjong Tengah					
Tanjong		Tanjong Utara					

=== Historical boundaries ===
State Constituency	Area					
State Constituency	1959	1974	1984	1994	2003	2018
Kampong Kolam		Anson Road; Burma Road; Carnarvon Street; Line Road; River Road		Anson Road; Burma Road; Carnarvon Street; Macalister Road; Prangin Road		
Komtar					Burma Road; Carnarvon Street; Dato Kramat Road; Macalister Road; Prangin Road	
Kota	Beach Street; Light Street; Little India; Weld Quay; Victoria Street					
Padang Kota		Argyll Road; Chulia Street; Light Street; Little India; Northam Road				
Pengkalan Kota		Bridge Street; Kampung Merdeka; Macallum Street; Weld Quay; Victoria Street				
Tanjong Tengah	Campbell Street; Carnavon Street; Chulia Street; Kimberley Street; Transfer Road					
Tanjong Utara	Argyll Road; Burmah Road; Khaw Sim Bee Road; Larut Road; Northam Road					

=== Current state assembly members ===
No.	State Constituency	Member	Coalition (Party)
N26	Padang Kota	Chow Kon Yeow	PH (DAP)
N27	Pengkalan Kota	Wong Yuee Harng	PH (DAP)
N28	Komtar	Teh Lai Heng	PH (DAP)

=== Local governments and postcodes ===
No.	State Constituency	Local Government	Postcode
N26	Padang Kota	Penang Island City Council	10000, 10050, 10100, 10200, 10300, 10400, 10450, 10503, 10506 Penang
N27	Pengkalan Kota	Penang Island City Council	10000, 10050, 10100, 10200, 10300, 10400, 10450, 10503, 10506 Penang
N28	Komtar	Penang Island City Council	10000, 10050, 10100, 10200, 10300, 10400, 10450, 10503, 10506 Penang

== Election results ==
Malaysian general election, 2022
Party	Candidate	Votes	%	∆%
PH	Lim Hui Ying	31,968	84.83	▲84.83
BN	Tan Kim Nee	3,214	8.53	▼4.22
PN	H'ng Khoon Leng	2,501	6.64	▲6.64
Total valid votes		37,683	100.00	
Total rejected ballots		386		
Unreturned ballots		72		
Turnout		38,141	71.34	▼9.59
Registered electors		52,803		
Majority		28,754	76.30	▲1.80
PH hold		Swing		
Source(s) https://lom.agc.gov.my/ilims/upload/portal/akta/outputp/1753273/PUB609%20(2022).pdf

Malaysian general election, 2018
Party	Candidate	Votes	%	∆%
PKR	Chow Kon Yeow	34,663	87.25	▲87.25
BN	Ng Siew Lai	5,064	12.75	▼3.45
Total valid votes		39,727	100.00	
Total rejected ballots		347		
Unreturned ballots		56		
Turnout		40,130	80.93	▼2.40
Registered electors		49,586		
Majority		29,599	74.50	▲6.90
PKR hold		Swing		
Source(s) "His Majesty's Government Gazette - Notice of Contested Election, Parliament for the State of Penang [P.U. (B) 236/2018]" (PDF). Attorney General's Chambers of Malaysia. 3 May 2018. "Federal Government Gazette - Results of Contested Election and Statements of the Poll after the Official Addition of Votes, Parliamentary Constituencies for the State of Penang [P.U. (B) 310/2018]" (PDF). Attorney General's Chambers of Malaysia. 28 May 2018.

Malaysian general election, 2013
Party	Candidate	Votes	%	∆%
DAP	Ng Wei Aik	35,510	83.80	▲9.48
BN	Ng Song Kheng	6,865	16.20	▼9.48
Total valid votes		42,375	100.00	
Total rejected ballots		495		
Unreturned ballots		33		
Turnout		42,903	83.33	▲10.51
Registered electors		51,487		
Majority		28,645	67.60	▲18.96
DAP hold		Swing		
Source(s) "Federal Government Gazette - Notice of Contested Election, Parliament for the State of Penang [P.U. (B) 173/2013]" (PDF). Attorney General's Chambers of Malaysia. 26 April 2013. "Federal Government Gazette - Results of Contested Election and Statements of the Poll after the Official Addition of Votes, Parliamentary Constituencies for the State of Penang [P.U. (B) 214/2013]" (PDF). Attorney General's Chambers of Malaysia. 22 May 2013. Archived from the original (PDF) on 2019-03-22.

Malaysian general election, 2008
Party	Candidate	Votes	%	∆%
DAP	Chow Kon Yeow	28,248	74.32	▲18.91
BN	Khaw Veon Szu	9,759	25.68	▼18.91
Total valid votes		38,007	100.00	
Total rejected ballots		631		
Unreturned ballots		96		
Turnout		38,734	72.82	▲4.10
Registered electors		53,188		
Majority		18,489	48.64	▲37.82
DAP hold		Swing		

Malaysian general election, 2004
Party	Candidate	Votes	%	∆%
DAP	Chow Kon Yeow	21,652	55.41	▲0.13
BN	Ooi Swee Hing	17,424	44.59	▼0.13
Total valid votes		39,076	100.00	
Total rejected ballots		717		
Unreturned ballots		0		
Turnout		39,793	68.72	▼2.13
Registered electors		57,905		
Majority		4,228	10.82	▲0.26
DAP hold		Swing		

Malaysian general election, 1999
Party	Candidate	Votes	%	∆%
DAP	Chow Kon Yeow	23,437	55.28	▼1.47
BN	Cheang Chee Gooi	18,960	44.72	▲1.47
Total valid votes		42,397	100.00	
Total rejected ballots		993		
Unreturned ballots		13		
Turnout		43,403	70.85	▼2.09
Registered electors		61,260		
Majority		4,477	10.56	▼4.71
DAP hold		Swing		

Malaysian general election, 1995
Party	Candidate	Votes	%	∆%
DAP	Lim Kit Siang	25,622	56.75	▼12.91
BN	Oh Keng Seng	18,727	41.48	▲11.14
PBS	Khor Ngak Seng @ Khor Gark Kim	800	1.77	▲1.77
Total valid votes		45,149	100.00	
Total rejected ballots		822		
Unreturned ballots		234		
Turnout		46,205	72.94	▼1.61
Registered electors		63,346		
Majority		6,895	15.27	▼24.05
DAP hold		Swing		

Malaysian general election, 1990
Party	Candidate	Votes	%	∆%
DAP	Lim Kit Siang	30,954	69.66	▲6.23
BN	Boey Weng Keat	13,485	30.34	▼6.23
Total valid votes		44,439	100.00	
Total rejected ballots		953		
Unreturned ballots		0		
Turnout		45,392	74.55	▲1.23
Registered electors		60,888		
Majority		17,469	39.32	▲12.46
DAP hold		Swing		

Malaysian general election, 1986
Party	Candidate	Votes	%	∆%
DAP	Lim Kit Siang	27,611	63.43	▲14.89
BN	Koh Tsu Koon	15,921	36.57	▼13.85
Total valid votes		43,532	100.00	
Total rejected ballots		931		
Unreturned ballots		0		
Turnout		44,463	73.32	▼3.84
Registered electors		60,640		
Majority		11,690	26.86	▲24.98
DAP gain from BN		Swing		?

Malaysian general election, 1982
Party	Candidate	Votes	%	∆%
BN	Koh Tsu Koon	22,394	50.42	▲17.03
DAP	Chian Heng Kai @ Chin Soo Ha	21,560	48.54	▲0.59
SDP	Yeap Ghim Guan	464	1.04	▲1.04
Total valid votes		44,418	100.00	
Total rejected ballots		899		
Unreturned ballots		0		
Turnout		45,317	77.16	▼2.54
Registered electors		58,735		
Majority		834	1.88	▼12.68
BN gain from DAP		Swing		?

Malaysian general election, 1978
Party	Candidate	Votes	%	∆%
DAP	Wong Hoong Keat	19,260	47.95	▲6.26
BN	Ronnie Ooi Oon Seng	13,412	33.39	▼12.60
Independent	Hoo Kee Ping	7,496	18.66	▲18.66
Total valid votes		40,168	100.00	
Total rejected ballots		1,220		
Unreturned ballots		0		
Turnout		41,388	79.70	▲6.26
Registered electors		51,930		
Majority		5,848	14.56	▲10.26
DAP gain from BN		Swing		?

Malaysian general election, 1974
Party	Candidate	Votes	%	∆%
BN	Lim Chong Eu	15,409	45.99	▲45.99
DAP	Yeap Ghim Guan	13,969	41.69	▲41.69
PEKEMAS	Tan Phock Kin	2,508	7.48	▲7.48
Parti Rakyat Malaysia	Lee Kok Liang	1,622	4.84	▲4.84
Total valid votes		33,508	100.00	
Total rejected ballots		804		
Unreturned ballots		0		
Turnout		34,312	73.44	▼3.60
Registered electors		46,719		
Majority		1,440	4.30	▼56.51
BN gain from GERAKAN		Swing		?

Malaysian general election, 1969
Party	Candidate	Votes	%	∆%
GERAKAN	Lim Chong Eu	19,656	78.85	▲78.85
Alliance	Chua Teng Siew	4,496	18.04	▼3.97
PPP	Khoo Yat See	775	3.11	▲3.11
Total valid votes		24,927	100.00	
Total rejected ballots		1,072		
Unreturned ballots		0		
Turnout		25,999	77.04	▼6.86
Registered electors		33,747		
Majority		15,160	60.81	▲45.33
GERAKAN gain from UDP		Swing		?

Malaysian general election, 1964
Party	Candidate	Votes	%	∆%
UDP	Lim Chong Eu	12,928	45.37	▲45.37
Socialist Front	Tan Phock Kin	8,516	29.89	▼27.09
Alliance	David Choong Ewe Leong	6,271	22.01	▼10.41
PAP	Tan Chong Bee	778	2.73	▲2.73
Total valid votes		28,493	100.00	
Total rejected ballots		672		
Unreturned ballots		0		
Turnout		29,165	83.90	▲12.25
Registered electors		34,763		
Majority		4,412	15.48	▼9.08
UDP gain from Socialist Front		Swing		?

Malayan general election, 1959
Party	Candidate	Votes	%
Socialist Front	Tan Phock Kin	11,333	56.98
Alliance	G. H. Goh	6,448	32.42
PPP	Khoo Yat See	2,107	10.59
Total valid votes		19,888	100.00
Total rejected ballots		237	
Unreturned ballots		0	
Turnout		20,125	71.65
Registered electors		28,086	
Majority		4,885	24.56
This was a new constituency created.
