= List of Malayan State and Settlement Council Representatives (1954–1959) =

List of Malayan State and Settlement Council Representatives (1954–1959)
List of Malaysian State Assembly Representatives (1959–1964)
List of Malaysian State Assembly Representatives (1964–1969)

The following are the members of the State and Settlement Council, elected in the 1954 and 1955 state election.

== Perlis ==
| State Constituency | Member | Party |
|---|---|---|
Alliance 9
| Kuala Perlis | Yusoff Abu Bakar | Alliance (UMNO) |
| Kangar | Wan Ahmad Wan Daud | Alliance (UMNO) |
| Sanglang | Ahmad Musa | Alliance (UMNO) |
| Paya | Sheikh Ahmad Mohd Hashim | Alliance (UMNO) |
| Mata Ayer | Mahayuddin Habib | Alliance (UMNO) |
| Beseri-Titi Tinggi | Rusli Hassan | Alliance (UMNO) |
| Kurong Anai | Mokhtar Ismail | Alliance (UMNO) |
| Arau | Salleh Osman | Alliance (UMNO) |
| Utan Aji | Syed Darus Syed Hashim | Alliance (UMNO) |

== Kedah ==
| State Constituency | Member | Party |
|---|---|---|
Alliance 12
| Kubang Pasu Barat | Ibrahim Salleh | Alliance (UMNO) |
| Jitra-Padang Terap | Omar Salleh | Alliance (UMNO) |
| Alor Star-Langkawi | Cheah Toon Lok | Alliance (MCA) |
| Kota Star Barat Laut | Ismail Ibrahim | Alliance (UMNO) |
| Kota Star Timor-Padang | Arshad Ismail | Alliance (UMNO) |
| Kota Star Selatan | Lim Joo Kong | Alliance (MCA) |
| Jerai | Hussein Che Dol | Alliance (UMNO) |
| Sik-Gurun-Kota | Che Norma Kamaruddin | Alliance (UMNO) |
| Sungei Patani | Low Chin Sean | Alliance (MCA) |
| Baling | Azahari Md. Taib | Alliance (UMNO) |
| Kulim Utara | Bibi Aishah Hamid Don | Alliance (UMNO) |
| Kulim-Bandar Bahru | Zainudddin Din | Alliance (UMNO) |

== Kelantan ==
| State Constituency | Member | Party |
|---|---|---|
Alliance 16
| Bachok Selatan | Zahari Abdul Rahman | Alliance (UMNO) |
| Bachok Utara | Ismail Ibrahim | Alliance (UMNO) |
| Kota Bharu Bandar | Abdul Aziz Omar | Alliance (UMNO) |
| Kota Bharu Selatan | Wong Yeow Wye | Alliance (MCA) |
| Kota Bharu Tengah | Nik Mohamad Amin Ali | Alliance (UMNO) |
| Kota Bharu Utara | Hassan Yaacob | Alliance (UMNO) |
| Machang | Tuan Yaacob Ungku Yunus | Alliance (UMNO) |
| Pasir Puteh Selatan | Abdul Rahman Yusof | Alliance (UMNO) |
| Pasir Puteh Utara | Mohamed Idris | Alliance (UMNO) |
| Pasir Mas Selatan | Yaacob Awang | Alliance (UMNO) |
| Pasir Mas Tengah | Abdul Rahman Daud | Alliance (UMNO) |
| Pasir Mas Utara | Omar Ali | Alliance (UMNO) |
| Tanah Merah | Abdul Ghani Mohamad | Alliance (UMNO) |
| Tumpat Utara | Basir Abdul Rashid | Alliance (UMNO) |
| Tumpat Selatan | Othman Muhammaduddin | Alliance (UMNO) |
| Ulu Kelantan | Mohamed Ali Abdullah | Alliance (UMNO) |

== Trengganu ==
| State Constituency | Member | Party |
|---|---|---|
Alliance 15
| Kuala Besut | Abdul Aziz Hussein | Alliance (UMNO) |
| Ulu Besut | Zainal Abidin Mohamed Amin | Alliance (UMNO) |
| Setiu | Ismail Yusuf | Alliance (UMNO) |
| Bandar Kuala Trengganu | Maidin Mohamed Ibrahim | Alliance (UMNO) |
| Ladang | Muda Abdullah | Alliance (UMNO) |
| Bukit Besar | Wan Ibrahim Ali | Alliance (UMNO) |
| Kuala Trengganu Utara | Ibrahim Fikri Mohamed | Alliance (UMNO) |
| Kuala Trengganu Barat | Mohamed Said Abdullah | Alliance (UMNO) |
| Kuala Trengganu Tengah | Ngah Ismail | Alliance (UMNO) |
| Kuala Trengganu Selatan | Abdullah Abdul Rahman | Alliance (UMNO) |
| Ulu Trengganu | Setia Abu Bakar | Alliance (UMNO) |
| Marang | Nordin Mohamed | Alliance (UMNO) |
| Dungun | Mohamed Taib Sabri Abu Bakar | Alliance (UMNO) |
| Paka-Kemaman Utara | Mohamed Taha Embong | Alliance (UMNO) |
| Kemaman Selatan | Wan Yahya Wan Mohamed | Alliance (UMNO) |

== Penang Settlement ==
| Settlement Constituency | Member | Party |
|---|---|---|
Alliance 14
| Batu Kawan | M. L. Samuel | Alliance (MIC) |
| Bukit Mertajam | Wong Pow Nee | Alliance (MCA) |
| Butterworth | Wee Tiong Ghee | Alliance (MCA) |
| East Coast | Aziz Ibrahim | Alliance (UMNO) |
| Jelutong | N.K. Menon | Alliance (MIC) |
| Kelawei | Lim Chong Eu | Alliance (MCA) |
| North Coast | Cheah Seng Khim | Alliance (MCA) |
| Province Wellesley Central | Md. Noor Hamzah | Alliance (UMNO) |
| Province Wellesley North | Hashim Awang | Alliance (UMNO) |
| Province Wellesley South | Sulaiman Ahmad | Alliance (UMNO) |
| South Coast | S. M. Hussain | Alliance (UMNO) |
| Tanjong East | Wong Loh Hun | Alliance (MCA) |
| Tanjong West | A. M. Abu Bakar | Alliance (UMNO) |
| West Coast | Nyak Hashim Nyak Puteh | Alliance (UMNO) |

== Perak ==
| State Constituency | Member | Party |
|---|---|---|
Alliance 19 | PMIP 1
| Taiping | Lee Kim Loon | Alliance (MCA) |
| Selama-Larut North | Hussein Yaacob | Alliance (UMNO) |
| Larut South-Matang | Wan Othman Wan Omar from 26 October 1957 | Alliance (UMNO) |
| Larut South-Matang | Mohamed Ghazali Jawi until 1957 | Alliance (UMNO) |
| Krian East | Ahmad Yusof | Alliance (UMNO) |
| Krian West | Mohamed Kamil Ahmad | PMIP |
| Dindings | Masud Untoi | Alliance (UMNO) |
| Ipoh North | R. M. N. Natesa Pillay | Alliance (MIC) |
| Ipoh South | Ismail Abdul Majid | Alliance (UMNO) |
| Ipoh East | Yap Yin Fah | Alliance (MCA) |
| Kinta North | Tajudin Ali | Alliance (UMNO) |
| Kinta South | Teh Siew Eng | Alliance (MCA) |
| Telok Anson | Woo Saik Hong | Alliance (MCA) |
| Lower Perak North | Yahaya Haji Haroun | Alliance (UMNO) |
| Lower Perak South | Lope Hashim Ketong | Alliance (UMNO) |
| Batang Padang North | Kok Yoon San | Alliance (MCA) |
| Batang Padang South | Mohamed Shazali Tajuddin | Alliance (UMNO) |
| Upper Perak | Che Ahmad Said | Alliance (UMNO) |
| Kuala Kangsar | Khalid Abas Adam | Alliance (UMNO) |
| Parit | Haron Kulop Seman | Alliance (UMNO) |
| Sungei Siput | Shaari Shafie | Alliance (UMNO) |

== Pahang ==
| State Constituency | Member | Party |
|---|---|---|
Alliance 16
| Bentong Barat | Hoh Chee Cheong | Alliance (MCA) |
| Bentong Timor | Mohamed Salleh Mohamed Zain | Alliance (UMNO) |
| Cameron Highlands | Wan Ibrahim Wan Tanjong | Alliance (UMNO) |
| Kuantan Barat | Zainuddin Ahmad | Alliance (UMNO) |
| Kuantan Timor | Abdul Aziz Ahmad | Alliance (UMNO) |
| Lipis Selatan | Khairuddin Kawi | Alliance (UMNO) |
| Lipis Timor | Abdullah Mohamed Akil | Alliance (UMNO) |
| Lipis Utara | Muhammad Nor Sulaiman | Alliance (UMNO) |
| Pekan Selatan | Ibrahim Arshad | Alliance (UMNO) |
| Pekan Utara | Ahmad Othman | Alliance (UMNO) |
| Raub Selatan | Seong Sik Yong | Alliance (MCA) |
| Raub Utara | Che Yeop @ Sendiri Hussin | Alliance (UMNO) |
| Temerloh Selatan | Ramlah Dahalan | Alliance (UMNO) |
| Temerloh Tengah | Yahaya Haji Mohamed Seh | Alliance (UMNO) |
| Temerloh Timor | Salehuddin Awang Pekan | Alliance (UMNO) |
| Temerloh Utara | Mohamad Yusof Long | Alliance (UMNO) |

== Selangor ==
| State Constituency | Member | Party |
|---|---|---|
Alliance 13
| Klang North | Mohamed Sidin Idris | Alliance (UMNO) |
| Klang South | V. Manickavasagam | Alliance (MIC) |
| Kuala Langat | Sa'adan Khadri Tahrim | Alliance (UMNO) |
| Kuala Lumpur East | Lee Yoon Thim | Alliance (MCA) |
| Kuala Lumpur Municipality East | Abdullah Yassin | Alliance (UMNO) |
| Kuala Lumpur Municipality South | Douglas K. K. Lee | Alliance (MCA) |
| Kuala Lumpur Municipality West | K. Gurupatham | Alliance (MIC) |
| Kuala Lumpur South | Chan Chee Hong | Alliance (MCA) |
| Kuala Lumpur West | Raja Mohamed Raja Alang | Alliance (UMNO) |
| Kuala Selangor | Raja Rastam Shahrome Raja Said Tauphy | Alliance (UMNO) |
| Sabak Bernam | Mustaffa Abdul Jabar | Alliance (UMNO) |
| Selangor Ulu | Nordin Nawi | Alliance (UMNO) |
| Ulu Langat | Zakaria Mohamed Taib | Alliance (UMNO) |

== Negri Sembilan ==
| State Constituency | Member | Party |
|---|---|---|
Alliance 12
| Jelebu | Ibrahim Mansor | Alliance (UMNO) |
| Jempol | Ariffin Ali | Alliance (UMNO) |
| Johol | Abdul Samad Idris | Alliance (UMNO) |
| Labu | Ahmad Omar | Alliance (UMNO) |
| Lenggeng | Alias Rasul | Alliance (UMNO) |
| Linggi | Mohamed Said Muhammad | Alliance (UMNO) |
| Pilah | Lee Tee Siong | Alliance (MCA) |
| Port Dickson | Kehar Singh | Alliance (MIC) |
| Rantau | Raja Abu Hanifah Abdul Ghani | Alliance (UMNO) |
| Rembau | Abdul Hamid Mahmud | Alliance (UMNO) |
| Seremban | Chin See Yin | Alliance (MCA) |
| Tampin | Abdul Wahab Idris | Alliance (UMNO) |

== Malacca Settlement ==
| Settlement Constituency | Member | Party |
|---|---|---|
Alliance 8
| East Central | Mohamed Abdul Rahman | Alliance (UMNO) |
| West Central | Tan Cheng Swee | Alliance (MCA) |
| West Fort | Goh Chee Yan | Alliance (MCA) |
| East Fort | Goh Kay Seng | Alliance (MCA) |
| Alor Gajah West | Mohamed Sudin Abdul Rahman | Alliance (UMNO) |
| Alor Gajah East | Talib Karim | Alliance (UMNO) |
| Jasin North | Hasnul Abdul Hadi | Alliance (UMNO) |
| Jasin South | Mokti Abdul Hamid | Alliance (UMNO) |

== Johore ==
| State Constituency | Member | Party |
|---|---|---|
Alliance 16
| Batu Pahat Central | Syed Mustapha Akil from 24 October 1957 | Alliance (UMNO) |
| Batu Pahat Central | S. Chelvasingam MacIntyre until 1957 | Alliance (MIC) |
| Batu Pahat Coastal | Taha Zakaria | Alliance (UMNO) |
| Batu Pahat Inland | Tan Suan Kok | Alliance (MCA) |
| Johore Bahru Central | Syed Nasir Ismail from 10 November 1955 | Alliance (UMNO) |
| Johore Bahru Central | Sulaiman Abdul Rahman until 1955 | Alliance (UMNO) |
| Johore Bahru Coastal | Mohd Amin Amran | Alliance (UMNO) |
| Johore Bahru Inland | Yap Kim Hock | Alliance (MCA) |
| Kluang | Syed Mohamed Edros from 10 November 1955 | Alliance (UMNO) |
| Kluang | Sardon Jubir until 1955 | Alliance (UMNO) |
| Kota Tinggi | Mohamed Yassin Abdul Rahman | Alliance (UMNO) |
| Mersing | Abdul Ghani Elias | Alliance (UMNO) |
| Muar Central | Chan Shi Shi | Alliance (MCA) |
| Muar Coastal | Sulaiman Ninam Shah | Alliance (UMNO) |
| Muar Inland | Hassan Yunus | Alliance (UMNO) |
| Pontian | Abdullah Mohsin | Alliance (UMNO) |
| Segamat North | Mohamad Noah Omar | Alliance (UMNO) |
| Segamat South | Chia Chin Koon | Alliance (MCA) |
| Tangkak | Chua Song Lim | Alliance (MCA) |

*S. Chelvasingam MacIntyre (Batu Pahat Central) was an associate member of UMNO. He contested under UMNO-MCA group and MIC joined the Alliance after Johor Elections

== See also ==
- List of Malayan state and settlement electoral districts 1954–1959
