= Lim Chong Eu =

Malaysian politician (1919–2010)

Yang Amat Berbahagia Tun Lim Chong Eu SSM DUPN DA
- 林苍祐

2nd Chief Minister of Penang
- In office 19 May 1969 – 25 October 1990
- Governor: Syed Sheh Barakbah; Sardon Jubir; Awang Hassan; Hamdan Sheikh Tahir
- Preceded by: Wong Pow Nee
- Succeeded by: Koh Tsu Koon

2nd President of Parti Gerakan Rakyat Malaysia
- In office 1969–1980
- Preceded by: Syed Hussein Alatas
- Succeeded by: Lim Keng Yaik

2nd President of Malayan Chinese Association
- In office March 1958 – July 1959
- Preceded by: Tan Cheng Lock
- Succeeded by: Cheah Toon Lok (acting); Tan Siew Sin

Personal details
- Born: Lim Chong Eu; 28 May 1919 Penang, Straits Settlements, British Malaya (now Malaysia)
- Died: 24 November 2010 (aged 91) Tanjung Bungah, Penang, Malaysia
- Citizenship: Malaysian
- Party: Gerakan (1968–1990); United Democratic Party (1962–1968); MCA (1952–1962); Radical Party (1951–1952)
- Education: University of Edinburgh
- Occupation: Politician, physician

Lim Chong Eu (simplified Chinese: 林苍祐; traditional Chinese: 林蒼祐; Pe̍h-ōe-jī: Lîm Chhong-iū; pinyin: Lín Cāngyòu; 28 May 1919 – 24 November 2010) was a Malaysian politician who served as the 2nd Chief Minister of Penang from May 1969 to October 1990 and the longest serving Chief Minister of Penang. He was also the founding president of Parti Gerakan Rakyat Malaysia (GERAKAN). He is also known as the "Architect of Modern Penang."

== Early life ==
Lim was born in 1919 in Penang. He was the older brother of Lim Chong Keat, the architect and botanist. He attended school at the Penang Free School, where he was the King's Scholar in 1937. He later obtained a degree in medicine and surgery from the University of Edinburgh, Scotland in 1944. Later moving to China to participate in the Second Sino-Japanese War. He worked in the Shanghai Medical College, then served in the Chinese Army Medical Forces and then became personal physician to the Chief of Staff Chen Cheng. Lim departed from China in 1947 as the Communist revolution began to swing decisively against the Kuomintang.

== Political career ==
In 1951, he was appointed to the Penang Local Council and in 1955, was appointed a member of the Federal Legislature.

In the March 1958 Malaysian Chinese Association (MCA) party elections, he challenged Tun Tan Cheng Lock and won the presidency with a majority of 22 votes.

During the one-year period when the MCA was under Lim, the party came under tremendous pressure from within and outside. After his victory, he called an extraordinary general meeting to amend the Constitution to consolidate the power of the Central Committee. This was met with strong resistance by Tun Tan Siew Sin and his supporters. Although the proposal was passed with a single-vote majority, the move left the party divided.

At the same time, the MCA under Lim also had severe political differences with Prime Minister Tunku Abdul Rahman. The crisis worsened on the eve of the 1959 general elections when Lim demanded 40 parliamentary seats and also wanted to make Chinese an official language. Tunku Abdul Rahman increased the seats allocated to MCA from 28 to 31 but this was rejected and their relationship worsened.

Tunku Abdul Rahman rejected Lim's demands, prompting Lim to resign as president of MCA and he left for England for a vacation. Cheah Toon Lock then became the Acting President of MCA. Lim returned to Malaya after a few years and formed the United Democratic Party, in 1962. Lim was elected as the Penang branch chairman of the party in 1964.

He was one of the founding members of the Parti Gerakan Rakyat Malaysia (GERAKAN) before the 1969 General Election. The formation of GERAKAN threw the Chinese Malaysian aggregate into a dilemma, weakened their political strength and eroded the political representation of the MCA as the only party for the Chinese community. GERAKAN joined the ruling Barisan Nasional after winning the Penang State Government in 1969.

=== Chief Minister of Penang ===
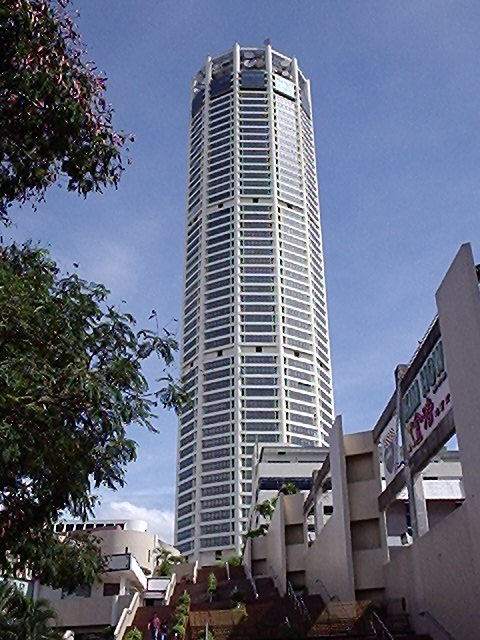
KOMTAR administrative tower and commercial complex.

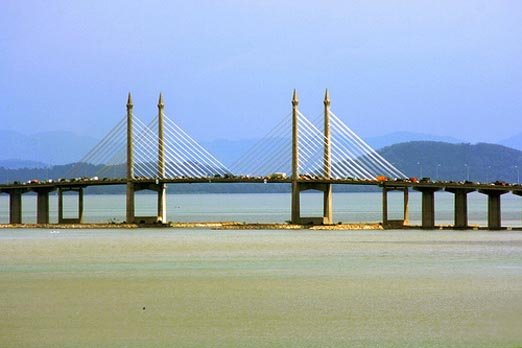
Penang Bridge.

Lim served as Chief Minister of Penang from 1969 to 1990. The iconic projects that emerged during Lim's rule included the 66-storey tall Komtar, and the 13.5 km long Penang Bridge. When it was topped-off, Komtar was for some time the tallest building in Asia, and the Penang Bridge one of the longest in the world. Lim is best known for overseeing the emergence of Penang's Free Trade Zone (FTZ) – later renamed Free Industrial Zone – which evolved into one of Asia's most powerful electronics hubs.

In the Malaysian General Elections of October 1990, a crisis occurred when Lim, serving as the chief minister, lost his state seat and GERAKAN had fewer seats than UMNO in the Penang State Assembly. A crisis was averted when Lim Keng Yaik, the then president of GERAKAN, was able to convince Prime Minister Mahathir Mohamad to allow an ethnic Chinese to continue on in the role of the Chief Minister.

== Retirement and death ==
Lim had retired from politics and was concentrating on business. He was at the time chairman and advisor for several large corporations. In 2007, Lim was named founding chancellor of Wawasan Open University.

In late October 2010, he was admitted to the Penang Hospital after suffering a stroke. He later died on Wednesday, 24 November 2010 at his home in Hillside, Tanjung Bungah at about 9 pm. On Thursday, 25 November 2010, he was given a state funeral. The Penang state flag was flown at half-mast from 25 to 28 November for 4 days as a mark of respect. His body was later cremated at the Batu Gantung Crematorium on Sunday, 28 November 2010.

== Election results ==
Parliament of Malaysia
Year	Constituency	Candidate	Votes	Pct	Opponent(s)	Votes	Pct	Ballots cast	Majority	Turnout
1964	P036 Tanjong	Lim Chong Eu (UDP)	12,928	45.37%	Tan Phock Kin (Lab)	8,516	29.89%	29,165	4,412	83.90%
1964	P036 Tanjong	Lim Chong Eu (UDP)	12,928	45.37%	David Choong Ewe Leong (MCA)	6,271	22.01%	29,165	4,412	83.90%
1964	P036 Tanjong	Lim Chong Eu (UDP)	12,928	45.37%	Tan Chong Bee (PAP)	778	2.73%	29,165	4,412	83.90%
1969	P036 Tanjong	Lim Chong Eu (Gerakan)	19,656	78.85%	Chua Teng Siew (MCA)	4,496	18.04%	25,999	15,160	77.04%
1969	P036 Tanjong	Lim Chong Eu (Gerakan)	19,656	78.85%	Khoo Yat See (PPP)	775	3.11%	25,999	15,160	77.04%
1974	P042 Tanjong	Lim Chong Eu (Gerakan)	15,409	45.99%	Yeap Ghim Guan (DAP)	13,969	41.69%	34,312	1,440	73.44%
1974	P042 Tanjong	Lim Chong Eu (Gerakan)	15,409	45.99%	Tan Phock Kin (PEKEMAS)	2,508	7.48%	34,312	1,440	73.44%
1974	P042 Tanjong	Lim Chong Eu (Gerakan)	15,409	45.99%	Lee Kok Liang (PRM)	1,622	4.84%	34,312	1,440	73.44%

Penang State Legislative Assembly
Year	Constituency	Candidate	Votes	Pct	Opponent(s)	Votes	Pct	Ballots cast	Majority	Turnout
1964	N16 Kota	Lim Chong Eu (UDP)	4,065	44.63%	Tan Puah Kim (Lab)	2,937	32.17%	9,317	1,128	81.91%
1964	N16 Kota	Lim Chong Eu (UDP)	4,065	44.63%	Liang Juen Chew (MCA)	1,962	21.49%	9,317	1,128	81.91%
1964	N16 Kota	Lim Chong Eu (UDP)	4,065	44.63%	Lim Ewe Hock (PAP)	165	1.81%	9,317	1,128	81.91%
1969	N16 Kota	Lim Chong Eu (Gerakan)	6,308	78.72%	Khaw Kok Chwee (MCA)	1,443	18.01%	8,246	4,865	74.58%
1969	N16 Kota	Lim Chong Eu (Gerakan)	6,308	78.72%	Khoo Yat See (PPP)	262	3.27%	8,246	4,865	74.58%
1974	N22 Padang Kota	Lim Chong Eu (Gerakan)	5,543	54.95%	Khoo Soo Giap (DAP)	3,303	32.74%	10,385	2,240	78.81%
1974	N22 Padang Kota	Lim Chong Eu (Gerakan)	5,543	54.95%	Tan Phock Kin (PEKEMAS)	936	9.28%	10,385	2,240	78.81%
1974	N22 Padang Kota	Lim Chong Eu (Gerakan)	5,543	54.95%	Lee Kok Liang (PSRM)	306	3.03%	10,385	2,240	78.81%
1978	N22 Padang Kota	Lim Chong Eu (Gerakan)								
1982	N22 Padang Kota	Lim Chong Eu (Gerakan)	9,151	75.87%	Lee Po Cheang (DAP)	2,910	24.13%	12,330	6,241	73.51%
1986	N22 Padang Kota	Lim Chong Eu (Gerakan)	6,426	55.69%	Wong Hang Yoke (DAP)	5,113	44.31%	11,830	1,313	69.69%
1990	N22 Padang Kota	Lim Chong Eu (Gerakan)	5,611	47.04%	Lim Kit Siang (DAP)	6,317	52.96%	12,221	706	72.14%

== Honours ==
=== Honours of Malaysia ===
- Malaysia
  - Grand Commander of the Order of Loyalty to the Crown of Malaysia (SSM) – Tun (1991)
  - Recipient of the Malaysian Commemorative Medal (Silver) (PPM) (1965)
- Penang
  - Knight Grand Commander of the Order of the Defender of State (DUPN) – Dato' Seri Utama (1989)
- Sarawak
  - Knight Commander of the Order of the Star of Hornbill Sarawak (DA) – Datuk Amar (1996)

=== Foreign honours ===
- Japan
  - Second Class of the Order of the Rising Sun, Gold and Silver Star (1989)

=== Places named after him ===
The 17.84 km Tun Dr Lim Chong Eu Expressway (Federal Route 3113) comprising Jelutong Expressway and Bayan Lepas Expressway was renamed after him on 7 December 2010.

Other memorials included the Tun Dr Lim Chong Eu Building, the headquarters of the Penang Development Corporation (PDC), located at Bayan Lepas, George Town.

Wawasan Open University's library is named Tun Dr Lim Chong Eu Library as a commemoration of his significant contribution as Penang's Chief Minister and the university's inaugural Chancellor.

Political offices
Preceded by Tan Cheng Lock	Malayan Chinese Association (MCA) President; March 1958 – July 1959	Succeeded by Cheah Toon Lok (Acting); Tan Siew Sin
Preceded by Syed Hussein Alatas	President of Parti Gerakan Rakyat Malaysia (Gerakan); 1969–1980	Succeeded by Lim Keng Yaik
Preceded by Wong Pow Nee	Chief Ministers of Penang; 1969–1990	Succeeded by Koh Tsu Koon
