= 1955 Malayan state elections =

State council elections were held in Malaya from 27 September to 12 November 1955 in all states except Trengganu and Johore.

== Results ==
=== Kedah ===
Party or alliance		Seats
Alliance Party	United Malays National Organisation	9
Alliance Party	Malayan Chinese Association	3
Alliance Party	Total	12
Total		12

=== Kelantan ===
Party or alliance		Seats
Alliance Party	United Malays National Organisation	15
Alliance Party	Malayan Chinese Association	1
Alliance Party	Total	16
Pan-Malayan Islamic Party		0
Total		16

=== Malacca ===
Party or alliance		Seats
Alliance Party	United Malays National Organisation	5
Alliance Party	Malayan Chinese Association	3
Alliance Party	Total	8
Pan-Malayan Islamic Party		0
Total		8

=== Negri Sembilan ===
Party or alliance		Seats
Alliance Party	United Malays National Organisation	9
Alliance Party	Malayan Chinese Association	2
Alliance Party	Malayan Indian Congress	1
Alliance Party	Total	12
Pan-Malayan Islamic Party		0
Total		12

=== Pahang ===
Party	Seats
Alliance Party	9
Pan-Malayan Islamic Party	0
Total	9

=== Penang ===
Party or alliance		Seats
Alliance Party	United Malays National Organisation	7
Alliance Party	Malayan Chinese Association	5
Alliance Party	Malayan Indian Congress	2
Alliance Party	Total	14
Pan-Malayan Islamic Party		0
Total		14

=== Perak ===
Party or alliance		Seats
Alliance Party	United Malays National Organisation	11
Alliance Party	Malayan Chinese Association	6
Alliance Party	Malayan Indian Congress	3
Alliance Party	Total	20
Pan-Malayan Islamic Party		1
Total		21

=== Perlis ===
Party or alliance		Seats
Alliance Party	United Malays National Organisation	9
Total		9

=== Selangor ===
Party or alliance		Seats
Alliance Party	United Malays National Organisation	8
Alliance Party	Malayan Chinese Association	3
Alliance Party	Malayan Indian Congress	2
Alliance Party	Total	13
Pan-Malayan Islamic Party		0
Labour Party of Malaya		0
Independents		0
Total		13
