= N.K. Menon =

Malaysian politician and doctor

N. K. Menon (1895–1979) is a Malaysian politician and medical doctor of Indian descent. He had serve as assemblyman for Jelutong in year 1954. He is well known for criticizing the exploitation of Indian labour by British capitalist. He also well known as the founder of Radical Party.

As Settlement Councillor in Penang and a member of the Settlement Executive Committee, he served the Indian community and the people of Penang with distinction. In his capacity as the Chairman of the Settlement Committee for Education, he played a notable role in serving both the English and Tamil schools in Penang State. Menon also had the distinction of becoming the President of the British Medical Association of Malaya between 1955-6. At different times he served as a President of the North Malaya Kerala Samajam and the Malaysian-German Society as well.

== Early life ==
Dr. N.K. Menon was born to P. K. Nambyar and his wife in Malabar, India. Nambyar is the Straith Settlement Couceler. Menon was educated in St. Xavier’s Institution in Penang and had his medical training at the University of Edinburgh, University of Tübingen in Germany and Madras University Medical College. He began his private practice in Penang in 1926. In the 1940s, Dr. Menon became actively involved in the Indian National Army (INA), an army inspired by radical Indian nationalists opposed to the moderate approach of the Indian National Congress. They teamed up with the advancing Japanese armies to expel the British from India-each for their own reasons.
