= 1974 Malaysian state elections =

State assembly elections were held in Malaysia between 24 August and 14 September 1974 in all states except Sabah.

== Results ==
=== Johore ===
Party or alliance		Votes	%	Seats	+/–
Barisan Nasional	United Malays National Organisation	68,801	33.93	20	+1
Barisan Nasional	Malaysian Chinese Association	67,128	33.10	10	0
Barisan Nasional	Malaysian Indian Congress	6,887	3.40	1	0
Barisan Nasional	Total	142,816	70.43	31	+1
Democratic Action Party		43,930	21.66	1	0
Malaysian Social Justice Party		4,576	2.26	0	New
Parti Sosialis Rakyat Malaysia		3,370	1.66	0	0
Independents		8,087	3.99	0	-1
Total		202,779	100.00	32	0
Valid votes		202,779	94.77		
Invalid/blank votes		11,180	5.23		
Total votes		213,959	100.00		
Registered voters/turnout		288,325	74.21		
Source: Almanak Keputusan Pilihan Raya Umum: Parlimen & Dewan Undangan Negeri (1959-1999) Tindak Malaysia Github

Total Number of Electors of Johor is 495412. The above registered voter count refers to total electors for all contested constituencies and excluding 15 uncontested state seats.

=== Kedah ===
Party or alliance		Votes	%	Seats	+/–
Barisan Nasional	United Malays National Organisation	62,076	32.33	12	0
Barisan Nasional	Pan-Malaysian Islamic Party	58,990	30.72	9	+1
Barisan Nasional	Malaysian Chinese Association	0	0.00	2	0
Barisan Nasional	Parti Gerakan Rakyat Malaysia	17,860	9.30	1	-1
Barisan Nasional	Total	138,926	72.35	24	0
Parti Sosialis Rakyat Malaysia		12,604	6.56	0	–
Democratic Action Party		7,680	4.00	1	0
Kesatuan Insaf Tanah Air		1,236	0.64	0	New
Independents		31,567	16.44	1	+1
Total		192,013	100.00	26	+2
Valid votes		192,013	95.49		
Invalid/blank votes		9,062	4.51		
Total votes		201,075	100.00		
Registered voters/turnout		286,091	70.28		
Source: Almanak Keputusan Pilihan Raya Umum: Parlimen & Dewan Undangan Negeri (1959-1999)Tindak Malaysia Github

Total Electors for Kedah is 171739. The above registered voter count refers to total electors for all contested constituencies and excluding 4 uncontested state seats.

=== Kelantan ===
Party or alliance		Votes	%	Seats	+/–
Barisan Nasional	Pan-Malaysian Islamic Party	96,737	45.79	22	+3
Barisan Nasional	United Malays National Organisation	52,897	25.04	13	+3
Barisan Nasional	Malaysian Chinese Association	6,452	3.05	1	0
Barisan Nasional	Total	156,086	73.89	36	+6
Parti Sosialis Rakyat Malaysia		5,519	2.61	0	–
Independents		49,637	23.50	0	0
Total		211,242	100.00	36	+6
Valid votes		211,242	94.51		
Invalid/blank votes		12,274	5.49		
Total votes		223,516	100.00		
Registered voters/turnout		304,313	73.45		
Source: Almanak Keputusan Pilihan Raya Umum: Parlimen & Dewan Undangan Negeri (1959-1999)Tindak Malaysia Github

Total Electors of Kelantan is 311609. The above registered voter count refers to total electors for all contested constituencies and excluding 1 uncontested state seat.

=== Malacca ===
Party or alliance		Votes	%	Seats	+/–
Barisan Nasional	United Malays National Organisation	39,044	36.62	12	+1
Barisan Nasional	Malaysian Chinese Association	17,462	16.38	3	–1
Barisan Nasional	Pan-Malaysian Islamic Party	4,660	4.37	1	+1
Barisan Nasional	Malaysian Indian Congress	1,881	1.76	0	0
Barisan Nasional	Total	63,047	59.13	16	+1
Democratic Action Party		19,832	18.60	4	0
Malaysian Social Justice Party		11,229	10.53	0	New
Parti Sosialis Rakyat Malaysia		10,393	9.75	0	0
Independents		2,123	1.99	0	0
Total		106,624	100.00	20	0
Valid votes		106,624	95.21		
Invalid/blank votes		5,365	4.79		
Total votes		111,989	100.00		
Registered voters/turnout		144,199	77.66		
Source: Almanak Keputusan Pilihan Raya Umum: Parlimen & Dewan Undangan Negeri (1959-1999)Tindak Malaysia Github

Total Electors of Malacca is 151699. The above registered voter count refers to total electors for all contested constituencies and excluding 1 uncontested state seat.

=== Negri Sembilan ===
Party or alliance		Votes	%	Seats	+/–
Barisan Nasional	United Malays National Organisation	37,287	31.83	14	+3
Barisan Nasional	Malaysian Chinese Association	27,979	23.88	5	+1
Barisan Nasional	Malaysian Indian Congress	3,083	2.63	1	0
Barisan Nasional	Pan-Malaysian Islamic Party	2,917	2.49	1	+1
Barisan Nasional	Total	71,266	60.83	21	+5
Democratic Action Party		30,679	26.19	3	–5
Parti Sosialis Rakyat Malaysia		3,394	2.90	0	–
Independent People's Progressive Party		1,785	1.52	0	New
Malaysian Social Justice Party		626	0.53	0	New
Independents		9,402	8.03	0	0
Total		117,152	100.00	24	0
Valid votes		117,152	95.27		
Invalid/blank votes		5,813	4.73		
Total votes		122,965	100.00		
Registered voters/turnout		157,233	78.21		
Source: Almanak Keputusan Pilihan Raya Umum: Parlimen & Dewan Undangan Negeri (1959-1999)Tindak Malaysia Github

Total Electors of Negri Sembilan is 178717. The above registered voter count refers to total electors for all contested constituencies and excluding 3 uncontested state seats.

=== Pahang ===
Party or alliance		Votes	%	Seats	+/–
Barisan Nasional	United Malays National Organisation	51,664	43.94	23	+7
Barisan Nasional	Malaysian Chinese Association	23,710	20.17	7	+3
Barisan Nasional	Pan-Malaysian Islamic Party	1,742	1.48	1	+1
Barisan Nasional	Parti Gerakan Rakyat Malaysia	0	0.00	1	0
Barisan Nasional	Total	77,116	65.59	32	+11
Parti Sosialis Rakyat Malaysia		16,273	13.84	0	-2
Democratic Action Party		7,823	6.65	0	0
Malaysian Social Justice Party		742	0.63	0	New
Independents		15,614	13.28	0	0
Total		117,568	100.00	32	+8
Valid votes		117,568	94.17		
Invalid/blank votes		7,283	5.83		
Total votes		124,851	100.00		
Registered voters/turnout		168,520	74.09		
Source: Almanak Keputusan Pilihan Raya Umum: Parlimen & Dewan Undangan Negeri (1959-1999)Tindak Malaysia Github

Total Electors is 176768 voters. The above registered voter count refers to total electors for all contested constituencies and excluding 3 uncontested state seats.

=== Penang ===
Party or alliance		Votes	%	Seats	+/–
Barisan Nasional	Parti Gerakan Rakyat Malaysia	57,813	27.27	11	–5
Barisan Nasional	United Malays National Organisation	29,997	14.15	9	+5
Barisan Nasional	Malaysian Chinese Association	11,144	5.26	1	+1
Barisan Nasional	Malaysian Indian Congress	4,494	2.12	1	+1
Barisan Nasional	Pan-Malaysian Islamic Party	3,893	1.84	1	+1
Barisan Nasional	Total	107,341	50.63	23	+3
Democratic Action Party		52,368	24.70	2	–1
Malaysian Social Justice Party		27,421	12.93	1	New
Parti Sosialis Rakyat Malaysia		13,516	6.38	0	-1
Kesatuan Insaf Tanah Air		2,654	1.25	0	New
Independents		8,697	4.10	1	+1
Total		211,997	100.00	27	+3
Valid votes		211,997	96.09		
Invalid/blank votes		8,630	3.91		
Total votes		220,627	100.00		
Registered voters/turnout		273,473	80.68		
Source: Almanak Keputusan Pilihan Raya Umum: Parlimen & Dewan Undangan Negeri (1959-1999)Tindak Malaysia Github

Total Electors is 289140. The above registered voter count refers to total electors for all contested constituencies and excluding 2 uncontested state seats.

=== Perak ===
Party or alliance		Votes	%	Seats	+/–
Barisan Nasional	United Malays National Organisation	108,875	25.84	21	+3
Barisan Nasional	People's Progressive Party	53,005	12.58	2	–10
Barisan Nasional	Malaysian Chinese Association	34,208	8.12	3	+2
Barisan Nasional	Parti Gerakan Rakyat Malaysia	9,082	2.16	1	–1
Barisan Nasional	Pan-Malaysian Islamic Party	12,361	2.93	3	+2
Barisan Nasional	Malaysian Indian Congress	5,663	1.34	1	+1
Barisan Nasional	Total	223,194	52.97	31	–3
Democratic Action Party		149,821	35.56	11	+5
Malaysian Social Justice Party		12,117	2.88	0	New
Kesatuan Insaf Tanah Air		1,824	0.43	0	New
Independents		34,364	8.16	0	0
Total		421,320	100.00	42	+2
Valid votes		421,320	95.01		
Invalid/blank votes		22,130	4.99		
Total votes		443,450	100.00		
Registered voters/turnout		587,758	75.45		
Source: Almanak Keputusan Pilihan Raya Umum: Parlimen & Dewan Undangan Negeri (1959-1999)Tindak Malaysia Github

Total Electors for Perak is 626565. The above registered voter count refers to total electors for all contested constituencies and excluding 3 uncontested state seats.

=== Perlis ===
Party or alliance		Votes	%	Seats	+/–
Barisan Nasional	United Malays National Organisation	15,194	40.32	8	-1
Barisan Nasional	Pan-Malaysian Islamic Party	4,923	13.06	2	+1
Barisan Nasional	Malaysian Chinese Association	4,776	12.67	2	0
Barisan Nasional	Total	24,893	66.05	12	+1
Parti Sosialis Rakyat Malaysia		6,338	16.82	0	0
Independents		6,457	17.13	0	0
Total		37,688	100.00	12	0
Valid votes		37,688	91.94		
Invalid/blank votes		3,304	8.06		
Total votes		40,992	100.00		
Registered voters/turnout		52,830	77.59		
Source: Almanak Keputusan Pilihan Raya Umum: Parlimen & Dewan Undangan Negeri (1959-1999)Tindak Malaysia Github

Total Electors for Perlis is 58721. The above registered voter count refers to total electors for all contested constituencies and excluding 1 uncontested state seat.

=== Sarawak ===
Party or alliance		Votes	%	Seats	+/–
Barisan Nasional	Parti Pesaka Bumiputera Bersatu	89,534	34.34	18	New
Barisan Nasional	Sarawak United Peoples' Party	54,958	21.08	12	0
Barisan Nasional	Total	144,492	55.42	30	New
Sarawak National Party		111,438	42.74	18	+6
Sarawak Bisamah Party		716	0.27	0	New
Independents		4,084	1.57	0	–1
Total		260,730	100.00	48	0
Valid votes		260,730	92.31		
Invalid/blank votes		21,732	7.69		
Total votes		282,462	100.00		
Registered voters/turnout		375,882	75.15		

According to Election Commission (EC), there were four candidates who contested under BISAMAH party flag for DUN Sarawak. However, EC has contradictory information claiming Lawrence Pohan contested under BISAMAH (hence one candidate) and classifying Lawrence Pohan as Independent. According to Results of 1974 General Election in Sarawak State (Malaysian Information Services, Sarawak) (1974), following are the BISAMAH candidates - Frank Dustino Sirau (Muara Tuang), Augustine Sirau (Batu Kawah), William Nais (Bengoh) and Lawrence Pohan (Tarat).

=== Selangor ===
Party or alliance		Votes	%	Seats	+/–
Barisan Nasional	United Malays National Organisation	75,821	33.54	19	+7
Barisan Nasional	Malaysian Chinese Association	35,862	15.87	7	+6
Barisan Nasional	Malaysian Indian Congress	14,511	6.42	3	+2
Barisan Nasional	Pan-Malaysian Islamic Party	0	0.00	1	+1
Barisan Nasional	Parti Gerakan Rakyat Malaysia	6,067	2.68	0	–4
Barisan Nasional	Total	132,261	58.52	30	+12
Democratic Action Party		36,518	16.16	1	–8
Malaysian Social Justice Party		23,872	10.56	0	New
Parti Sosialis Rakyat Malaysia		1,599	0.71	0	0
Independents		31,778	14.06	2	+1
Total		226,028	100.00	33	+5
Valid votes		226,028	94.21		
Invalid/blank votes		13,902	5.79		
Total votes		239,930	100.00		
Registered voters/turnout		319,759	75.03		
Source: Almanak Keputusan Pilihan Raya Umum: Parlimen & Dewan Undangan Negeri (1959-1999)Tindak Malaysia Github

Total Electors for Selangor is 337353. The above registered voter count refers to total electors for all contested constituencies and excluding 2 uncontested state seats.

=== Trengganu ===
Party or alliance		Votes	%	Seats	+/–
Barisan Nasional	United Malays National Organisation	48,161	39.87	17	+5
Barisan Nasional	Pan-Malaysian Islamic Party	25,150	20.82	9	–2
Barisan Nasional	Malaysian Chinese Association	3,782	3.13	1	0
Barisan Nasional	Total	77,093	63.82	27	+3
Parti Sosialis Rakyat Malaysia		36,189	29.96	0	0
Independents		7,511	6.22	1	+1
Total		120,793	100.00	28	+4
Valid votes		120,793	92.92		
Invalid/blank votes		9,205	7.08		
Total votes		129,998	100.00		
Registered voters/turnout		176,960	73.46		
Source: Almanak Keputusan Pilihan Raya Umum: Parlimen & Dewan Undangan Negeri (1959-1999)Tindak Malaysia Github

Total Electors for Trengganu is 183769. The above registered voter count refers to total electors for all contested constituencies and excluding 1 uncontested state seat.
